= Fencing at the 2011 Pan American Games =

- Venue: Multipurpose Gymnasium
- Dates: October 24–29
- Competitors: 154 from 15 nations

Fencing competitions at the 2011 Pan American Games in Guadalajara is being held from October 24 to October 29 at the Multipurpose Gymnasium. All 12 events will be on the schedule, meaning every team event will be contested, after reverting to Olympic only events in 2007.

== Medal summary ==
=== Medal table ===
* Host nation (Mexico)

Rank	Nation	Gold	Silver	Bronze	Total
1	United States	11	3	0	14
2	Canada	1	4	3	8
3	Venezuela	0	3	5	8
4	Mexico*	0	1	2	3
5	Chile	0	1	0	1
6	Brazil	0	0	3	3
6	Cuba	0	0	3	3
8	Argentina	0	0	1	1
8	Panama	0	0	1	1
Totals (9 entries)		12	12	18	42

=== Men's events ===
Event	Gold	Silver	Bronze
Individual épée	Weston Kelsey; United States	Rubén Limardo; Venezuela	Silvio Fernández; Venezuela
Individual épée	Weston Kelsey; United States	Rubén Limardo; Venezuela	Reynier Henriquez; Cuba
Team épée	United States; Soren Thompson; Weston Kelsey; Cody Mattern; Gerek Meinhardt	Venezuela; Silvio Fernández; Francisco Limardo; Rubén Limardo; Jhon Perez	Canada; Tigran Bajgoric; Igor Gantsevich; Vincent Pelletier; Étienne Turbide
Individual foil	Alexander Massialas; United States	Felipe Alvear; Chile	Antonio Leal; Venezuela
Individual foil	Alexander Massialas; United States	Felipe Alvear; Chile	Guilherme Toldo; Brazil
Team foil	United States; Miles Chamley-Watson; Alexander Massialas; Gerek Meinhardt	Canada; Étienne Turbide; Anthony Prymack; Nicolas Teisseire; Tigran Bajgoric	Brazil; Fernando Scavasin; Heitor Shimbo; Guilherme Toldo; Renzo Agresta
Individual sabre	Philippe Beaudry; Canada	Timothy Morehouse; United States	Hernán Jansen; Venezuela
Individual sabre	Philippe Beaudry; Canada	Timothy Morehouse; United States	Joseph Polossifakis; Canada
Team sabre	United States; Benjamin Igoe; Timothy Morehouse; James Williams	Canada; Joseph Polossifakis; Philippe Beaudry; Vincent Couturier; Anthony Prymack	Brazil; Renzo Agresta; William De Moraes; Tywilliam Pacheco; Heitor Shimbo

=== Women's events ===
Event	Gold	Silver	Bronze
Individual épée	Kelley Hurley; United States	Courtney Hurley; United States	Elida Aguero; Argentina
Individual épée	Kelley Hurley; United States	Courtney Hurley; United States	Yamirka Rodriguez; Cuba
Team épée	United States; Lindsay Campbell; Courtney Hurley; Kelley Hurley	Canada; Sherraine Schalm; Ainsley Switzer; Sandra Sassine; Daria Jorqera	Mexico; Alexandra Avena; Andrea Millan; Alejandra Terán; Alely Hernandez
Individual foil	Lee Kiefer; United States	Nzingha Prescod; United States	Monica Peterson; Canada
Individual foil	Lee Kiefer; United States	Nzingha Prescod; United States	Nataly Michel; Mexico
Team foil	United States; Lee Kiefer; Nzingha Prescod; Doris Willette; Ibtihaj Muhammad	Canada; Alanna Goldie; Monica Peterson; Kelleigh Ryan; Sandra Sassine	Venezuela; Mariana González; Johana Fuenmayor; Yulitza Suarez; Maria Martinez
Individual sabre	Mariel Zagunis; United States	Alejandra Benítez; Venezuela	Eileen Grench; Panama
Individual sabre	Mariel Zagunis; United States	Alejandra Benítez; Venezuela	Yaritza Goulet; Cuba
Team sabre	United States; Ibtihaj Muhammad; Mariel Zagunis; Dagmara Wozniak; Lindsay Campbell	Mexico; Úrsula González; Angelica Aguilar; Angélica Larios; Alejandra Terán	Venezuela; Alejandra Benítez; Yulitza Suarez; Maria Blanco; Patricia Contreras

== Schedule ==
All times are Central Daylight Time (UTC−5).

Day	Date	Start	Finish	Event	Phase
Day 11	Monday October 24, 2011	9:00	14:40	Women's individual foil	Preliminaries
Day 11	Monday October 24, 2011	9:00	14:40	Men's individual épée	Preliminaries
Day 11	Monday October 24, 2011	18:50	21:15	Women's individual foil	Semifinals/Finals
Day 11	Monday October 24, 2011	18:50	21:15	Men's individual épée	Semifinals/Finals
Day 12	Tuesday October 25, 2011	9:00	14:20	Women's individual sabre	Preliminaries
Day 12	Tuesday October 25, 2011	9:00	14:20	Men's individual foil	Preliminaries
Day 12	Tuesday October 25, 2011	18:50	21:15	Women's individual sabre	Semifinals/Finals
Day 12	Tuesday October 25, 2011	18:50	21:15	Men's individual foil	Semifinals/Finals
Day 13	Wednesday October 26, 2011	9:00	14:20	Women's individual épée	Preliminaries
Day 13	Wednesday October 26, 2011	9:00	14:20	Men's individual sabre	Preliminaries
Day 13	Wednesday October 26, 2011	18:50	21:15	Women's individual épée	Semifinals/Finals
Day 13	Wednesday October 26, 2011	18:50	21:15	Men's individual sabre	Semifinals/Finals
Day 14	Thursday October 27, 2011	8:30	17:50	Women's team foil	Quarter/Semifinals/Bronze medal match
Day 14	Thursday October 27, 2011	8:30	17:50	Men's team épée	Quarter/Semifinals/Bronze medal match
Day 14	Thursday October 27, 2011	18:50	21:00	Women's team foil	Finals
Day 14	Thursday October 27, 2011	18:50	21:00	Men's team épée	Finals
Day 15	Friday October 28, 2011	8:30	17:30	Women's team sabre	Quarter/Semifinals/Bronze medal match
Day 15	Friday October 28, 2011	8:30	17:30	Men's team foil	Quarter/Semifinals/Bronze medal match
Day 15	Friday October 28, 2011	18:50	21:50	Women's team sabre	Finals
Day 15	Friday October 28, 2011	18:50	21:50	Men's team foil	Finals
Day 16	Saturday October 29, 2011	8:30	17:30	Women's team épée	Quarter/Semifinals/Bronze medal match
Day 16	Saturday October 29, 2011	8:30	17:30	Men's team sabre	Quarter/Semifinals/Bronze medal match
Day 16	Saturday October 29, 2011	18:50	21:50	Women's team épée	Finals
Day 16	Saturday October 29, 2011	18:50	21:50	Men's team sabre	Finals

== Qualification ==
An NOC may enter up to 3 athletes per weapon (épée, foil, or sabre) if it has qualified for the team event and 1 athlete per if it has not.

The top seven teams at the 2010 Pan American Championship in San José, Costa Rica plus hosts Mexico in each team event qualify a three athletes for each respective team event, and two athletes for the individual event for that weapon. Also this championship qualified the top 2 athletes per event for the individual event if the country had not qualified through the team event.

=== Participating nations ===
Nation	Men						Women						Athletes
Nation	Individual Épée	Team Épée	Individual Foil	Team Foil	Individual Sabre	Team Sabre	Individual Épée	Team Épée	Individual Foil	Team Foil	Individual Sabre	Team Sabre	Athletes
Argentina	1		2	X	2	X	2	X			2	X	13
Brazil			2	X	2	X	2	X	2	X	2	X	15
Canada	2	X	2	X	2	X	2	X	2	X	1		16
Chile	2	X	2	X	2	X	2	X	2	X			15
Colombia	2	X			1								4
Costa Rica							1						1
Cuba	2	X	2	X	2	X	2	X	2	X	2	X	18
Dominican Republic							1		1		2	X	5
El Salvador	2	X	1		1				1				6
Guatemala	1												1
Mexico	2	X	2	X	2	X	2	X	2	X	2	X	18
Panama											2	X	3
Puerto Rico			1						2	X	1		5
United States	2	X	2	X	2	X	2	X	2	X	2	X	18
Venezuela	2	X	2	X	2	X	2	X	2	X	2	X	18
Total athletes	18	24	18	24	18	24	18	24	18	24	18	24	156
Total NOCs	10	8	10	8	10	8	10	8	10	8	10	8	15 NOCs
