= Fencing at the 2011 Pan American Games – Women's sabre =

Women's sabre at the 2011 Pan American Games
- Venue: Multipurpose Gymnasium
- Dates: October 25
- Competitors: 18 from 10 nations

Medalists
Gold medal	Mariel Zagunis	United States
Silver medal	Alejandra Benítez	Venezuela
Bronze medal	Yaritza Goulet	Cuba
Bronze medal	Eileen Grench	Panama

The women's sabre competition of the fencing events at the 2011 Pan American Games in Guadalajara, Mexico, was held on October 25 at the Multipurpose Gymnasium. The defending champion was Mailyn González from Cuba.

The sabre competition consisted of a qualification round followed by a single-elimination bracket with a bronze medal match between the two semifinal losers. Fencing was done to 15 touches or to the completion of three three-minute rounds if neither fencer reached 15 touches by then. At the end of time, the higher-scoring fencer was the winner; a tie resulted in an additional one-minute sudden-death time period. This sudden-death period was further modified by the selection of a draw-winner beforehand; if neither fencer scored a touch during the minute, the predetermined draw-winner won the bout.

== Schedule ==
All times are Central Standard Time (UTC−6).

Date	Time	Round
October 25, 2011	11:50	Qualification pools
October 25, 2011	13:10	Round of 16
October 25, 2011	13:50	Quarterfinals
October 25, 2011	19:40	Semifinals
October 25, 2011	20:30	Final

== Results ==
=== Qualification ===
All 18 fencers were put into three groups of six athletes, were each fencer would have five individual matches. The top 16 athletes overall would qualify for next round.

Rank	Name	Nation	Victories	TG	TR	Dif.	Notes
1	Patricia Contreras	Venezuela	5	25	12	+13	Q
2	Alejandra Benítez	Venezuela	4	24	13	+11	Q
3	Eileen Grench	Panama	4	22	11	+11	Q
4	Mariel Zagunis	United States	4	24	15	+9	Q
5	Ibtihaj Muhammad	United States	3	22	14	+8	Q
6	Sandra Sassine	Canada	3	22	16	+6	Q
7	María Belén Pérez Maurice	Argentina	3	20	16	+4	Q
8	Estefania Berninsone	Argentina	3	20	17	+3	Q
9	Yaritza Goulet	Cuba	3	19	19	0	Q
10	Élora Pattaro	Brazil	2	20	17	+3	Q
11	Rossy Félix	Dominican Republic	2	18	19	-1	Q
12	Angélica Larios	Mexico	2	16	18	-2	Q
13	Yexi Salazar	Cuba	2	12	18	-6	Q
14	Maybelline Johnnson	Dominican Republic	2	11	21	-10	Q
15	Úrsula González	Mexico	1	15	22	-7	Q
16	Melanie Mercado	Puerto Rico	1	16	24	-8	Q
17	Karina Lakerbai	Brazil	1	13	23	-10	
18	Ana Batista	Panama	0	1	25	-24	

=== Elimination round ===
Round of 16
1	Patricia Contreras (VEN)	10
16	Melanie Mercado (PUR)	15
9	Yaritza Goulet (CUB)	15
10	Élora Pattaro (BRA)	5
5	Ibtihaj Muhammad (USA)	15
12	Angélica Larios (MEX)	4
13	Yexi Salazar (CUB)	11
4	Mariel Zagunis (USA)	15
3	Eileen Grench (PAN)	15
14	Maybelline Johnnson (DOM)	6
11	Rossy Félix (DOM)	13
6	Sandra Sassine (CAN)	15
7	María Belén Pérez Maurice (ARG)	15
8	Estefania Berninsone (ARG)	9
15	Úrsula González (MEX)	6
2	Alejandra Benítez (VEN)	15

Quarterfinals
16	Melanie Mercado (PUR)	11
9	Yaritza Goulet (CUB)	15
5	Ibtihaj Muhammad (USA)	4
4	Mariel Zagunis (USA)	15
3	Eileen Grench (PAN)	15
6	Sandra Sassine (CAN)	13
7	María Belén Pérez Maurice (ARG)	13
2	Alejandra Benítez (VEN)	15

Semifinals
9	Yaritza Goulet (CUB)	7
4	Mariel Zagunis (USA)	15
3	Eileen Grench (PAN)	14
2	Alejandra Benítez (VEN)	15

Final
4	Mariel Zagunis (USA)	15
2	Alejandra Benítez (VEN)	13
