= Venezuela at the 2011 Pan American Games =

- IOC code: VEN
- NOC: Venezuelan Olympic Committee
- Website: www.cov.com.ve

in Guadalajara 14–30 October 2011
- Competitors: 388 in 31 sports
- Flag bearer: Andreina Pinto
- Medals Ranked 8th: Gold 11 Silver 27 Bronze 33 Total 71

Pan American Games appearances (overview)
- 1951; 1955; 1959; 1963; 1967; 1971; 1975; 1979; 1983; 1987; 1991; 1995; 1999; 2003; 2007; 2011; 2015; 2019; 2023

Venezuela competed at the 2011 Pan American Games in Guadalajara, Mexico from October 14 to 30, 2011. Venezuela's flag bearer (swimmer Andreina Pinto) was selected by an online vote by the general public. Venezuela competed with 388 athletes in 31 sports.

== Medalists ==
Medal	Name	Sport	Event	Date
Gold	Hersony Canelón	Cycling	Men's sprint	October 19
Gold	Daniela Larreal	Cycling	Women's Keirin	October 20
Gold	Hersony Canelón; César Marcano; Ángel Pulgar	Cycling	Men's team sprint	October 17
Gold	Daniela Larreal; Mariestela Vilera	Cycling	Women's team sprint	October 17
Gold	Angie Sabrina González	Cycling	Women's Omnium	October 20
Gold	Albert Subirats	Swimming	Men's 100 metre butterfly	October 20
Gold	Luis Liendo	Wrestling	Men's Greco-Roman 60 kg	October 21
Gold	Israel Rubio	Weightlifting	Men's 69 kg	October 24
Gold	Angel Aponte	Karate	Men's +84 kg	October 27
Gold	José Peña	Athletics	Men's 3,000 metres steeplechase	October 28
Gold	Cesar Herrera	Karate	Men's 84 kg	October 28
Silver	Maribel Pineda	Shooting	Women's 10 metre air pistol	October 16
Silver	Igor Hernández; Farid Mussa	Beach volleyball	Men's tournament	October 22
Silver	Daniela Larreal	Cycling	Women's individual sprint	October 18
Silver	Hersony Canelón	Cycling	Men's Keirin	October 20
Silver	César Castro; Jorge Hirkesom	Racquetball	Men's doubles	October 22
Silver	Andreina Pinto	Swimming	Women's 400 metre freestyle	October 17
Silver	Fabiola Ramos; Ruaida Ezzeddine; Luisana Perez	Table Tennis	Women's team	October 17
Silver	Carlos Vazquez	Taekwondo	Men's 80 kg	October 17
Silver	Juan Carlos Díaz	Taekwondo	Men's +80 kg	October 18
Silver	Betsi Rivas	Weightlifting	Women's 48 kg	October 23
Silver	Jorge Cardozo	Wrestling	Men's Greco-Roman 55 kg	October 20
Silver	Rafael Barreno	Wrestling	Men's Greco-Roman 120 kg	October 20
Silver	Miguel Ubeto	Cycling	Men's road race	October 22
Silver	Jesús López	Weightlifting	Men's 62 kg	October 23
Silver	Rubén Limardo	Fencing	Men's individual épée	October 24
Silver	Inmara Henriquez	Weightlifting	Women's 53 kg	October 24
Silver	Junior Sanchez	Weightlifting	Men's 69 kg	October 24
Silver	Luis Vivenes	Wrestling	Men's freestyle 96 kg	October 24
Silver	José Lander; Amleto Monacelli	Bowling	Men's pairs	October 25
Silver	Alejandra Benítez	Fencing	Women's individual sabre	October 25
Silver	Marielys Rojas	Athletics	Women's high jump	October 26
Silver	Herbys Márquez	Weightlifting	Men's 94 kg	October 26
Silver	Silvio Fernandez; Francisco Limardo; Rubén Limardo; Jhon Perez	Fencing	Men's team épée	October 27
Silver	Sandra Buelvas	Roller skating	Women's 1,000 metres	October 27
Silver	Julio Luna	Weightlifting	Men's 105 kg	October 27
Silver	Yoel Morales	Weightlifting	Men's +105 kg	October 27
Silver	Yaniuska Espinoza	Weightlifting	Women's +75 kg	October 27
Bronze	Emilio Torres	Rowing	Men's single sculls	October 19
Bronze	Cesar Amaris; José Güipe	Rowing	Men's double sculls	October 17
Bronze	Franco Di Mauro	Shooting	Men's 25 metre rapid fire pistol	October 22
Bronze	Maribel Pineda	Shooting	Women's 25 metre pistol	October 19
Bronze	Cristian Quintero	Swimming	Men's 400 metre freestyle	October 15
Bronze	Octavio Alesi; Crox Acuña; Cristian Quintero; Albert Subirats; Luis Rojas*; Roberto Gomez*; Daniele Tirabassi*	Swimming	Men's 4 × 100 metre freestyle relay	October 16
Bronze	Daniele Tirabassi; Cristian Quintero; Albert Subirats; Marcos Lavado; Eddy Marín*; Ricardo Monasterio*; Alejandro Gomez	Swimming	Men's 4 × 200 metre freestyle relay	October 19
Bronze	Arlene Semeco	Swimming	Women's 100 metre freestyle	October 19
Bronze	Andreina Pinto	Swimming	Women's 200 metre freestyle	October 16
Bronze	Andreina Pinto	Swimming	Women's 800 metre freestyle	October 19
Bronze	Yorgen Cova	Wrestling	Men's Greco-Roman 84 kg	October 20
Bronze	Yuri Alexei Maier	Wrestling	Men's Greco-Roman 96 kg	October 21
Bronze	Jaramit Weffer	Wrestling	Women's Freestyle 72 kg	October 22
Bronze	Jose Diaz	Wrestling	Men's freestyle 84 kg	October 23
Bronze	Silvio Fernandez	Fencing	Men's individual épée	October 24
Bronze	Ricardo Roberty	Wrestling	Men's freestyle 74 kg	October 24
Bronze	Karlha Magliocco	Boxing	Women's flyweight 51 kg	October 25
Bronze	Ángel Rodríguez	Boxing	Men's Bantamweight 56 kg	October 25
Bronze	Yoelvis Hernandez	Boxing	Men's Light welterweight 64 kg	October 25
Bronze	Juan Rodriguez	Boxing	Men's Middleweight 75 kg	October 25
Bronze	Antonio Leal	Fencing	Men's individual foil	October 25
Bronze	Eduar Villanueva	Athletics	Men's 1,500 metres	October 26
Bronze	Hernan Jansen	Fencing	Men's individual sabre	October 26
Bronze	Maria Alvarez	Weightlifting	Women's 75 kg	October 26
Bronze	Karen Marcano	Bowling	Women's singles	October 27
Bronze	Mariana González; Johana Fuenmayor; Yulitza Suarez; Maria Martinez	Fencing	Women's team foil	October 27
Bronze	José Acevedo; Alberto Aguilar; Said Boni; Omar Longart; Arturo Ramírez	Athletics	Men's 4 × 400 metres relay	October 28
Bronze	Ángel Rodríguez	Boxing	Men's Bantamweight 56 kg	October 28
Bronze	Yoelvis Hernandez	Boxing	Men's Light welterweight 64 kg	October 28
Bronze	Juan Rodriguez	Boxing	Men's Middleweight 75 kg	October 28
Bronze	Anderson Ramos; Ronny Ratia	Canoeing	Men's C-2 1,000 metres	October 28
Bronze	Alejandra Benítez; Maria Blanco; Patricia Contreras; Yulitza Suarez	Fencing	Women's team sabre	October 28
Bronze	Ricardo Valderrama	Judo	Men's 66 kg	October 28
Bronze	Yoly Guillen	Karate	Women's 68 kg	October 28

== Archery ==
Venezuela has qualified three male and three female athletes in the archery competition.

Men

Athlete	Event	Ranking Round		Round of 32	Round of 16	Quarterfinals	Semifinals	Final	Rank
Athlete	Event	Score	Seed	Opposition Score	Opposition Score	Opposition Score	Opposition Score	Opposition Score	Rank
Elias Malave	Men's individual	1310	9	J Barillas (GUA); W 6–0	P Vivas (MEX); W 6–2	B Ellison (USA); L 0–6	did not advance		5
Manuel Diaz	Men's individual	1242	22	E Vélez (MEX); L 1–7	did not advance				17
David Vilchez	Men's individual	1201	28	J Franchin (USA); W 6–4	X Rezendre (BRA); L 2–6	did not advance			9
Elias Malave; Manuel Diaz; David Vilchez	Men's team	3753	7		BYE	Mexico; L 208–212	did not advance		5

Women

Athlete	Event	Ranking Round		Round of 32	Round of 16	Quarterfinals	Semifinals	Final	Rank
Athlete	Event	Score	Seed	Opposition Score	Opposition Score	Opposition Score	Opposition Score	Opposition Score	Rank
Leidys Brito	Women's individual	1323	5	M Acquesta (BRA); W 7–1	M Cardoza (PUR); W 7–1	P Ramirez (COL); W 6–2	A Valencia (MEX); L 2–6	A Román (MEX); L 1–7	4
Saraneth Rivera	Women's individual	1259	14	S Nikitin (BRA); L 3–7	did not advance				17
Yerubi Suarez	Women's individual	1206	26	K Vrakking (CAN); L 0–6	did not advance				17
Yerubi Suarez; Leidys Brito; Saraneth Rivera	Women's team	3788	3		BYE	Argentina; W 198–191	United States; L 204–211	Cuba; L 198–201	4

== Athletics ==
Venezuela has qualified an athletics team.

=== Men ===
Track and road events

Event	Athletes	Heats		Semifinal		Final	
Event	Athletes	Time	Rank	Time	Rank	Time	Rank
200 m	José Acevedo	20.93	3rd QS	20.85	5th	did not advance	
400 m	Alberto Aguilar			46.39	5th	did not advance	
400 m	Omar Longart			46.50	5th	did not advance	
800 m	Nico Herrera			1:49.29	6th	did not advance	
800 m	Eduar Villanueva			DNS		did not advance	
1500 m	Nico Herrera					3:56.30	7th
1500 m	Eduar Villanueva					3:54.06	3rd place, bronze medalist(s)
5000 m	Luis Orta					14:59.00	12th
Marathon	Larryn Sanchez					2:50:20	18th
3000 m steeplechase	Marvin Blanco					8:50.85	5th
3000 m steeplechase	José Peña					8:48.19	1st place, gold medalist(s)
400 m hurdles	Victor Solarte			51.31	3rd	did not advance	
4 × 400 m relay	José Acevedo; Alberto Aguilar; Omar Longart; Arturo Ramírez			3:04.67 SB	2nd Q	3:00.82 SB	3rd place, bronze medalist(s)

Field events

Event	Athletes	Semifinal		Final	
Event	Athletes	Result	Rank	Result	Rank
Long jump	Víctor Castillo	7.75 m.	2nd Q	8.05 m.	1st place, gold medalist(s)
Discus throw	Jesus Parejo			55.35 m.	8th
Hammer throw	Aldo Bello			63.46 m. SB	8th

Combined Event

Decathlon	Event	Geormi Jaramillo		
Decathlon	Event	Results	Points	Rank
	100 m	10.85	894	6th
	Long jump	7.41 m. PB	913	1st
	Shot put	14.96 m. PB	787	2nd
	High jump	1.84 m. PB	661	11th
	400 m	48.30 PB	895	2nd
	110 m hurdles	14.22 PB	946	2nd
	Discus throw	41.99 m. PB	705	7th
	Pole vault	3.90 m.	590	10th
	Javelin throw	56.35 m. PB	683	7th
	1500 m	4:52.26 PB	605	6th
Final			7679	6th

=== Women ===
Track and road events

Event	Athletes	Semifinal		Final	
Event	Athletes	Time	Rank	Time	Rank
Marathon	Yolimar Pineda			2:51:58	10th
20 km walk	Milangela Rosales			1:43:17	11th

Field events

Event	Athletes	Semifinal		Final	
Event	Athletes	Result	Rank	Result	Rank
High jump	Marielys Rojas			1.89 m. SB	2nd place, silver medalist(s)
Pole vault	Keisa Monterola			4.30 m.	5th
Hammer throw	Rosa Rodríguez			64.78 m.	8th
Javelin throw	Yusbely Parra			53.49 m.	4th

Combined Event

Heptathlon	Event	Gullercy Gonzalez			Thaimara Rivas		
Heptathlon	Event	Results	Points	Rank	Results	Points	Rank
	100 m hurdles	14.30 PB	936	9th	14.25 PB	943	8th
	High jump	1.74 m.	903	3rd	1.59 m. PB	724	11th
	Shot put	10.95 m. PB	592	10th	12.11 m.	668	7th
	200 m	25.47 PB	844	8th	26.48 PB	756	12th
	Long jump	5.41 m.	674	9th	5.44 m.	683	8th
	Javelin throw	35.34 m.	578	8th	36.83 m.	607	6th
	800 m	2:27.52	724	8th	DNS		
Final			5241	7th		DNF	

== Badminton ==
Venezuela has qualified four male and four female athletes in the badminton competition.

Men

Athlete	Event	First round	Second round	Third round	Quarterfinals	Semifinals	Final	Rank
Athlete	Event	Opposition Result	Opposition Result	Opposition Result	Opposition Result	Opposition Result	Opposition Result	Rank
Luis Camacho	Men's singles	BYE	D Paiola (BRA); L 0–2 (14–21, 9–21)	did not advance				
Leonard Uzcategui	Men's singles	BYE	A Tjong (BRA); L 0–2 (6–21, 8–21)	did not advance				
Kisbel Matute	Men's singles	BYE	C Pyne (JAM); L 0–2 (9–21, 9–21)	did not advance				
Jose Lazo; Leonard Uzcategui	Men's doubles			C Araya (CHI); E Mujica (CHI); L 0–2 (10–21, 6–21)	did not advance			
Luis Camacho; Kisbel Matute	Men's doubles			A Liu (CAN); D Ng (CAN); L 0–2 (5–21, 6–21)	did not advance			

Women

Athlete	Event	First round	Second round	Third round	Quarterfinals	Semifinals	Final	Rank
Athlete	Event	Opposition Result	Opposition Result	Opposition Result	Opposition Result	Opposition Result	Opposition Result	Rank
Everlyn Quintero	Women's singles	N Rangel (MEX); L 0–2 (4–21, 3–21)	did not advance					
Gabriela Araujo	Women's singles	BYE	N Sotomayor (GUA); L 0–2 (6–21, 12–21)	did not advance				
Leidy Tovar	Women's singles	BYE	L Vicente (BRA); L 0–2 (8–21, 8–21)	did not advance				
Daniela Araujo; Leidy Tovar	Women's doubles		BYE	L Duany (PER); A Monteverde (PER); L 0–2 (13–21, 4–21)	did not advance			
Gabriela Araujo; Everlyn Quintero	Women's doubles		O Cabrera (DOM); V Vivieca (DOM); L 0–2 (13–21, 9–21)	did not advance				

Mixed

Athlete	Event	First round	Second round	Quarterfinals	Semifinals	Final	Rank
Athlete	Event	Opposition Result	Opposition Result	Opposition Result	Opposition Result	Opposition Result	Rank
Luis Camacho; Leidy Tovar	Mixed doubles	N Javier (DOM); V Vivieca (DOM); L 0–2 (14–21, 14–21)	did not advance				
Leonard Uzcategui; Gabriela Araujo	Mixed doubles	D Ng (CAN); A Bruce (CAN); L 0–2 (6–21, 11–21)	did not advance				

== Baseball ==
Venezuela has qualified a team of twenty-three athletes in the baseball competition.

Team

- Ronald Acuña
- Luis Jose Alen
- Gabriel Alfaro
- Oscar David Angulo
- Juan Aponte
- Luis Azocar
- Jhonny Caraballo
- Rodolfo Cardona
- Josmar Carreno
- Dirimo Chavez
- Juan Colmenarez
- George Delgado
- Juan Fuentes
- Antonio Jose Granadillo
- Hebert Lara
- Carlos Enrique Mory
- Jesus Reyes
- Arturo Rivas
- Yonathan Sivira
- Luis Torres
- Saul Torres
- Wuillians Vasquez
- Jesus Maria Yepez

Group B

Pos	Team	W	L	RF	RA	RD	PCT	GB	Qualification
1	Cuba	3	0	22	16	+6	1.000	—	Advance to Semifinals
2	Canada	2	1	14	14	0	.667	1	Advance to Semifinals
3	Venezuela	1	2	14	15	−1	.333	2	
4	Puerto Rico	0	3	17	22	−5	.000	3	

October 19, 2011; 14:00	Venezuela	4 – 5	Cuba	Pan American Baseball Stadium, Lagos de Moreno
October 19, 2011; 14:00		http://200.57.183.69/ENG/BB/BBR173A_BBM40040010200002ENG.htm		Pan American Baseball Stadium, Lagos de Moreno

October 20, 2011; 10:00	Venezuela	9 – 6	Puerto Rico	Pan American Baseball Stadium, Lagos de Moreno
October 20, 2011; 10:00		http://200.57.183.69/ENG/BB/BBR173A_BBM40040010200003ENG.htm		Pan American Baseball Stadium, Lagos de Moreno

October 22, 2011; 10:00	Venezuela	1 – 4	Canada	Pan American Baseball Stadium, Lagos de Moreno
October 22, 2011; 10:00		http://200.57.183.69/ENG/BB/BBR173A_BBM40040010200006ENG.htm		Pan American Baseball Stadium, Lagos de Moreno

Fifth place match

October 25, 2011; 10:00	Venezuela	7 – 14	Dominican Republic	Pan American Baseball Stadium, Lagos de Moreno
October 25, 2011; 10:00		Boxscore		Pan American Baseball Stadium, Lagos de Moreno

2011 Pan American Games 6th

Venezuela

== Basque pelota ==
Venezuela has qualified two athletes each in the paleta rubber pairs trinkete, paleta leather pairs 36m fronton, mano doubles 36m fronton, paleta leather pairs 30m fronton, and the women's frontenis pairs 30m fronton categories and one athlete each in the mano singles trinkete and mano singles 30m fronton categories.

Men

Athlete(s)	Event	Series 1	Series 2	Series 3	Series 4	Bronze Medal	Final
Athlete(s)	Event	Opposition Score	Opposition Score	Opposition Score	Opposition Score	Opposition Score	Opposition Score
Jose Pina; Jesus Zarraga	Paleta Rubber Pairs Trinkete	Adrian Raya (MEX) & Guillermo Verdeja; L 6-15, 3-15	Carlos Buzzo (URU) & Enzo Cazzola; L 8-15, 2-15	Facundo Andreasen (ARG) & Sergio Villegas; L 4-15, 4-15	Sebastian De Orte (CHI) & Esteban Romero; L 11-15, 5-15	did not advance	
Ekaitz Lacasa	Mano Singles Trinkete	Darien Povea (CUB); L 4-15, 3-15					4th-5th place match: Luis Antonio Maidana (ARG); L 7-15, 6-15; 5th
Jorge Borrajo; Gabrrel Reyes	Paleta Leather Pairs 36m Fronton	Rodrigo Ledesma (MEX) & Javier Francisco Mendiburu; L 6-15, 13-15	Lucas Rivas (URU) & Javier Francisco Mendiburu; W 1510, 15-11	Luciano Callarelli (ARG) & Carlos Dorato; L 9-15, 11-15	Rafael Fernández (CUB) & Azuan Perez; L 9-15, 9-15	Luciano Callarelli (ARG) & Carlos Dorato; L 10-15, 4-15	Did not advance
Iker Urcelay	Mano Singles 16m Fronton	Henrry Despaigne (CUB); W 8-10, 10-4, 5-4	Fernando Medina (MEX); L 1-10, 1-10	Roberto Huarte (USA); L 0-10, 3-10		Henrry Despaigne (CUB); L 7-10, 8-10	Did not advance
Carlos Salinas; Miklos Vidal	Mano Doubles 16m Fronton	Dariel Leiva (CUB) & Ruben Moya; L 7-10, 7-10	Axel Mikkan (ARG) & Lucas Varrone; W 10-3, 10-3			Dariel Leiva (CUB) & Ruben Moya; L 6-10, 4-10	Did not advance
Eduardo Casellas; Jaime Vera	Paleta Rubber Pairs 30m Fronton	Raul Comesaña (URU) & Fausto Lancelotti; L 3-12, 10-12	Jose Fiffe (CUB) & Jhoan Torreblanca; L 1-12, 7-12	Jesus Hurtado (MEX) & Daniel Salvador Rodriguez; L 5-12, 3-12	Leonardo Benique (PER) & Kevin Martinez; W 12-4, 12-5	did not advance	

Women

Athlete(s)	Event	Series 1	Series 2	Series 3	Series 4	Bronze Medal	Final	Rank
Athlete(s)	Event	Opposition Score	Opposition Score	Opposition Score	Opposition Score	Opposition Score	Opposition Score	Rank
Rosa Diaz; Patricia Toro	Frontenis Pairs 30m Fronton	Irina Podversich (ARG) & Johanna Zair; W 12-7, 12-4	Lisandra Lima (CUB) & Yasmary Medina; L 7-12, 10-12	Paulina Castillo (MEX) & Guadalupe Hernandez; L 2-12, 8-12	Natalia Bozzo (CHI) & Andrea Salgado; W 12-5, 12-10	Irina Podversich (ARG) & Johanna Zair; L 12-10, 7-12, 3-5	did not advance	

== Beach volleyball ==
Venezuela has qualified a men's team in the beach volleyball competition.

Men

Athlete	Event	Preliminary round			Quarterfinals	Semifinals	Finals
Athlete	Event	Opposition Score	Opposition Score	Opposition Score	Opposition Score	Opposition Score	Opposition Score
Igor Hernández; Farid Mussa	Men's	Andrew Barnett Fuller (USA); Mark van Zwieten (USA); W 21-18, 18-21, 16-14	Esteban Grimalt (CHI); Marco Grimalt (CHI); W 21-19, 18-21, 18-16	Jeovanny Medrano (ESA); David Vargas (ESA); W 21-10, 21-17	Erick Garrido (GUA); Andy Leonardo (GUA); W 21-15, 21-15	Santiago Etchegaray (ARG); Pablo Suarez (ARG); W 21-19, 16-21, 15-12	Alison Cerutti (BRA); Emanuel Rego (BRA); L 17-21, 12-21 (silver)

== Bowling ==
Venezuela has qualified two male and two female athletes in the bowling competition.

=== Men ===
Individual

Athlete	Event	Qualification															Eighth Finals	Quarterfinals	Semifinals	Finals
Athlete	Event	Block 1 (Games 1–6)						Block 2 (Games 7–12)						Total	Average	Rank	Eighth Finals	Quarterfinals	Semifinals	Finals
Athlete	Event	1	2	3	4	5	6	7	8	9	10	11	12	Total	Average	Rank	Opposition Scores	Opposition Scores	Opposition Scores	Opposition Scores
Jose Lander	Men's individual	196	237	277	205	226	202	222	226	191	191	220	211	2604	217.0	8th Q	Santiago Mejía (COL); L 560-570	did not advance		
Amleto Monacelli	Men's individual	216	211	204	258	245	193	247	233	256	217	224	187	2691	224.3	3rd Q	Mario Valverde (CRC); L 614-645	did not advance		

Pairs

Athlete	Event	Block 1 (Games 1–6)								Block 2 (Games 7–12)								Grand Total	Final Rank
Athlete	Event	1	2	3	4	5	6	Total	Average	7	8	9	10	11	12	Total	Average	Grand Total	Final Rank
Jose Lander; Amleto Monacelli	Men's pairs	180	214	210	190	215	165	1174	195.7	200	245	184	195	209	237	2444	203.7	5018	2nd place, silver medalist(s)
Jose Lander; Amleto Monacelli	Men's pairs	225	189	238	224	231	189	1296	216.0	150	245	188	279	190	226	2574	214.5	5018	2nd place, silver medalist(s)

=== Women ===
Individual

Athlete	Event	Qualification															Eighth Finals	Quarterfinals	Semifinals	Finals
Athlete	Event	Block 1 (Games 1–6)						Block 2 (Games 7–12)						Total	Average	Rank	Eighth Finals	Quarterfinals	Semifinals	Finals
Athlete	Event	1	2	3	4	5	6	7	8	9	10	11	12	Total	Average	Rank	Opposition Scores	Opposition Scores	Opposition Scores	Opposition Scores
Patricia De Faria	Women's individual	217	212	204	159	156	235	199	184	228	205	138	175	2312	192.7	13th Q	Sofia Rodriguez (GUA); W 620 – 586	Jennifer Park (CAN); L 535-668	did not advance	
Karen Marcano	Women's individual	183	221	201	224	203	198	202	171	210	169	193	194	2369	197.4	8th Q	Kamilah Dammers (ARU); W 645 – 613	Aura Guerra (DOM); W 652 – 595	Elizabeth Johnson (USA); L 0-2; 206-249, 203-254 (bronze)	Did not advance

Pairs

Athlete	Event	Block 1 (Games 1–6)								Block 2 (Games 7–12)								Grand Total	Final Rank
Athlete	Event	1	2	3	4	5	6	Total	Average	7	8	9	10	11	12	Total	Average	Grand Total	Final Rank
Patricia De Faria; Karen Marcano	Women's pairs	173	167	210	177	211	176	1114	185.7	204	201	190	207	214	222	2352	196.0	4813	5th
Patricia De Faria; Karen Marcano	Women's pairs	186	185	179	226	191	179	1146	191.0	188	222	211	219	257	219	2461	205.1	4813	5th

== Boxing ==
Venezuela has qualified 8 athletes in the 56 kg, 60 kg, 64 kg, 69 kg, 75 kg, 91 kg and 91+kg men's categories and one athlete in the 51 kg women's category.

Men

Athlete	Event	Round of 16	Quarterfinals	Semifinals	Final
Athlete	Event	Opposition Result	Opposition Result	Opposition Result	Opposition Result
Angel Jose Rodriguez	Bantamweight		Alberto Melián (ARG); W 16 – 6	Lázaro Álvarez (CUB); L 7 – 17 (bronze)	did not advance
Fradimil Macayo	Lightweight		Yasniel Toledo (CUB); L 5 – 24	did not advance	
Yoelvis Jesus Hernandez	Light welterweight	Cesar Rivas (PAN); W 14 – 10	Anderson Rojas (ECU); W 10 – 9	Valentino Knowles (BAH); L 6 – 11 (bronze)	did not advance
Gabriel Maestre	Welterweight		Carlos Banteurt (CUB); L 7 – 20	did not advance	
Juan Carlos Rodríguez	Middleweight	Andrew Fermin (TRI); W RET R2 3:00	Reece Shagourie (JAM); W 16 – 10	Jaime Cortez (ECU); L 8 – 14 (bronze)	did not advance
Wualfredo Rivero	Heavyweight		Yamil Peralta (ARG); L 7 – 11	did not advance	
Jose David Payares	Super heavyweight		Juan Hiracheta (MEX); L RSC R2 2:35	did not advance	

Women

Athlete	Event	Round of 16	Quarterfinals	Semifinals	Final
Athlete	Event	Opposition Result	Opposition Result	Opposition Result	Opposition Result
Karlha Francesca Magliocco	Flyweight		Pamela Sanchez (CRC); W 27 – 14	Ingrit Valencia (COL); L 8 – 17 (bronze)	did not advance

== Canoeing ==
Venezuela has qualified seven boats for male events and 4 boats for female events.

Men

Athlete(s)	Event	Heats		Semifinals		Final	
Athlete(s)	Event	Time	Rank	Time	Rank	Time	Rank
Jhonson Vergara	K-1 200 m	34.073	3rd QF			34.779	8th
Jesus Andres Colmenares; Jose Ramos	K-2 200 m	37.378	3rd QF			37.393	8th
Ray Rene Acuna	K-1 1000 m					3:55.810	8th
Ray Rene Acuna; Jesus Andre Colmenares; Jose Ramos; Jhonson Vergara	K-4 1000 m					3:05.996	6th
Ronny Ratia	C-1 200 m	41.607	3rd QF			42.205	4th
Edwar Paredes	C-1 1000 m					4:13.569	4th
Anderson Ramos; Ronny Ratia	C-2 1000 m					3:40.990	3rd place, bronze medalist(s)

Women

Athlete(s)	Event	Heats		Semifinals		Final	
Athlete(s)	Event	Time	Rank	Time	Rank	Time	Rank
Zulmarys Sánchez	K-1 200 m	42.850	3rd QF			43.808	6th
Eliana Escalona	K-1 500 m	2:03.292	5th QS	2:11.311	3rd QF	2:01.218	7th
Angélica Jiménez; Zulmarys Sánchez	K-2 500 m	1:54.533	4th QS	1:52.848	1st QF	1:54.330	7th
Eliana Escalona; Angélica Jiménez; Lauribel Mejias; Zulmarys Sánchez	K-4 500 m					1:39.599	4th

== Cycling ==
Venezuela has qualified a full cycling team.

=== Road cycling ===
Men

Athlete	Event	Time	Rank
Artur Albeiro García	Road race	3:45:06	21st
Tomás Aurelio Gil	Road race	3:50:58	26th
Honorio Rafael Machado	Road race	3:45:02	12th
Miguel Armando Ubeto	Road race	3:40:53	2nd place, silver medalist(s)
Tomás Aurelio Gil	Time trial	51:38.74	8th

Women

Athlete	Event	Time	Rank
Danielys García	Road race	2:18:23	11th
Lilibeth Chacón	Road race	2:18:23	17th
Angie Sabrina González	Road race	2:18:23	7th
Danielys García	Time trial	28:04.82	9th

=== Track cycling ===
Sprints & Pursuit

Athlete	Event	Qualifying		Round of 16	1/8 finals (repechage)	Quarterfinals	Semifinals	Final
Athlete	Event	Time Speed (km/h)	Rank	Opposition Time Speed	Opposition Time Speed	Opposition Time Speed	Opposition Time Speed	Opposition Time Speed
Hersony Canelón	Men's sprint	71.956	4th Q	Ángel Pulgar (VEN); W 65.323		James Watkins (USA); W 2 – 1	Njisane Phillip (TRI); W 2 – 0	Fabián Puerta (COL); W 2 – 0 (gold)
Ángel Pulgar	Men's sprint	70.381	9th Q	Hersony Canelón (VEN); L 65.323	Alejandro Mainat (CUB); Leandro Bottasso (ARG); 69.284 1st Q	Ruben Horta (MEX); W 2 – 0	Fabián Puerta (COL); L 1 – 2	Bronze medal match: Njisane Phillip (TRI); L 0 – 2
Ángel Pulgar; Hersony Canelón; César Marcano	Men's team sprint	61.365 PR	1st QF					Gold medal match: United States; W 62.517 PR (gold)
Daniela Larreal	Women's sprint	65.484 PR	1st Q			Laura Arias (CUB); W 2 – 0	Juliana Gaviria (COL); W 2 – 0	Lisandra Guerra (CUB); L 0 – 2 (silver)
Gleydimar Tapia	Women's sprint	61.791	10th			did not advance		
Gleydimar Tapia; Daniela Larreal	Women's team sprint	53.169 PR	1st QF					Gold medal match: Colombia; W 53.553 PR (gold)
Lilibeth Chacón; Danielys García; Angie González	Women's team pursuit	51.766	4th					Bronze medal match: Colombia; L 3:30.823

Keirin

Athlete	Event	1st round	Repechage	Final
Hersony Canelón	Men's keirin	1st Q		2nd place, silver medalist(s)
Daniela Larreal	Women's keirin			1st place, gold medalist(s)

Omnium

Athlete	Event	Flying Lap Time Rank	Points Race Points Rank	Elimination Race Rank	Ind Pursuit Time	Scratch Race Rank	Time Trial Time	Final Rank
Carlos Linares	Men	66.410; 5th	DNF; 22nd	7th	4:36.244; 5th	DNF; 20th	1:05.687; 6th	65; 10th
Angie González	Women	61.016; 3rd	35; 1st	1st	3:39.467; 3rd	0; 4th	50.022; 2nd	14 (gold)

=== Mountain biking ===
Men

Athlete	Event	Time	Rank
Antonio Guzman	Cross-country	1:45:44	14th

Women

Athlete	Event	Time	Rank
Liliana Uzcategui	Cross-country	1:44:04	10th

=== BMX ===
Athlete	Event	Qualifying Run 1		Qualifying Run 2		Qualifying Run 3		Qualifying	Semifinal		Final	
Athlete	Event	Time	Points	Time	Points	Time	Points	Points	Points	Rank	Time	Rank
Jonathan Suarez	Men	36.921	4	38.748	4	35.883	2	10 Q	37.868	5th	did not advance	

== Diving ==
Venezuela will send 7 divers (4 male, 3 female) to the Pan American Games

Men

Athlete	Event	Preliminary		Final	
Athlete	Event	Points	Rank	Points	Rank
Edickson Contreras	3 m springboard	379.80	10th Q	426.85	7th
Robert Páez	3 m springboard	364.90	11th Q	313.80	12th
Enrique Rojas	10 m platform	340.70	11th Q	364.50	9th
Robert Páez	10 m platform	DNS		did not advance	
Emilio Colmenarez; Robert Páez	3 m synchronized springboard			345.57	7th
Edickson Contreras; Enrique Rojas	10 m synchronized platform			362.64	7th

Women

Athlete	Event	Preliminary		Final	
Athlete	Event	Points	Rank	Points	Rank
Maria Betancour	3 m springboard	225.75	11th Q	270.00	9th
Beannelys Velasquez	3 m springboard	DNF		did not advance	
Maria Betancour	10 m platform	293.85	6th Q	274.10	6th
Lisette Ramirez	10 m platform	216.95	12th Q	242.00	11th
Maria Betancour; Lisette Ramirez	10 m synchronized platform			229.86	5th

== Equestrian ==
Venezuela qualified 12 athletes (8 male, 4 female) in all equestrian events

=== Dressage ===
Athlete	Horse	Event	Grand Prix		Grand Prix Special		Grand Prix Freestyle		Final Score	Rank
Athlete	Horse	Event	Score	Rank	Score	Rank	Score	Rank	Final Score	Rank
Maria Arocha	Aristocrata	Individual	58.553	45th	did not advance					
Alejandro Gomez	Revenge	Individual	66.632	20th	66.737	17th	66.725	15th	66.731	15th
Irina Moleiro	Sambuca	Individual	61.211	35th	did not advance					
Beatriz Torbay	Don Royal	Individual	65.632	23rd	61.921	24th	did not advance			
Maria Arocha; Alejandro Gomez; Irina Moleiro; Beatriz Torbay	as above	Team							64.492	7th

=== Eventing ===
Athlete	Horse	Event	Dressage		Cross-country		Jumping				Total	
Athlete	Horse	Event	Dressage		Cross-country		Qualifier		Final		Total	
Athlete	Horse	Event	Penalties	Rank	Penalties	Rank	Penalties	Rank	Penalties	Rank	Penalties	Rank
Novis Borges	Ritual	Individual	65.00	34th	EL		did not advance					
Elena Ceballo	Nounours Du Moulin	Individual	56.90	18th	0.00	8th	0.00	7th	0.00	5th	56.90	5th
Francisco Martinez	Ser Unico	Individual	66.70	40th	EL		did not advance					
Carlos Silva	T Start	Individual	71.70	45th	EL		did not advance					
Novis Borges; Elena Ceballo; Francisco Martinez; Carlos Silva	as above	Individual	188.60	9th	1868.30	9th	0.00	7th			2056.90	7th

=== Individual jumping ===
Athlete	Horse	Event	Ind. 1st Qualifier		Ind. 2nd Qualifier			Ind. 3rd Qualifier			Ind. Final					
Athlete	Horse	Event	Ind. 1st Qualifier		Ind. 2nd Qualifier			Ind. 3rd Qualifier			Round A		Round B		Total	
Athlete	Horse	Event	Penalties	Rank	Penalties	Total	Rank	Penalties	Total	Rank	Penalties	Rank	Penalties	Rank	Penalties	Rank
Pablo Barrios	G&C Quick Star	Individual	3.22	12th	EL			did not advance								
Angel Karolyi	James T. Kirk	Individual	5.89	28th	8.00	13.89	26th	12.00	25.89	35th	did not advance					
Andres Rodriguez	Beaufort Van Han Lind.	Individual	5.83	27th	0.00	5.83	14th	16.00	21.83	28th	5.00	22nd	17.00	21st	43.83	21st
Noel Vanosote	Conrad D	Individual	5.02	19th	8.00	13.02	24th	16.00	29.02	38th	did not advance					

=== Team jumping ===
Athlete	Horse	Event	Qualification Round		Final					
Athlete	Horse	Event	Qualification Round		Round 1		Round 2		Total	
Athlete	Horse	Event	Penalties	Rank	Penalties	Rank	Penalties	Rank	Penalties	Rank
Pablo Barrios; Angel Karolyi; Andres Rodriguez; Noel Vanosote	as above	Team	14.07	6th	16.00	5th	40.00	8th	70.07	8th

== Fencing ==
Venezuela has qualified athletes in all fencing events (men's & women's épée, foil, and sabre).

Men

Event	Athlete	Round of Poules		Round of 16	Quarterfinals	Semifinals	Final
Event	Athlete	Result	Seed	Opposition Score	Opposition Score	Opposition Score	Opposition Score
Silvio Fernández	Individual épée	4 V – 1 D	1st Q	Gabriel Ochoa (MEX); W 15 – 11	Tigran Bajgoric (CAN); W 15 – 10	Rubén Darío Limardo (VEN); L 2 – 4 (bronze)	did not advance
Rubén Darío Limardo	Individual épée	3 V – 2 D	5th Q	Vincent Pelletier (CAN); W 15 – 7	Soren Thompson (USA); W 15 – 11	Silvio Fernández (VEN); W 4 – 2	Weston Kelsey (USA); L 10 – 12 (silver)
Silvio Fernández; Francisco Limardo; Rubén Darío Limardo	Team épée				Cuba; W 45 – 40	Canada; W 40 – 39	United States; L 25 – 42 (silver)
Antonio Leal	Individual foil	3 V – 2 D	6th Q	Carlos Eduardo Rodríguez (VEN); W 15 – 6	Anthony Prymack (CAN); W 15 – 12	Felipe Alvear (CHI); L 14 – 15 (bronze)	did not advance
Carlos Eduardo Rodríguez	Individual foil	2 V – 3 D	11th Q	Antonio Leal (VEN); L 6 – 15	did not advance		
Antonio Leal; Jhon Edilber Perez; Carlos Eduardo Rodríguez	Team foil				Canada; L 22 – 45	5th-8th place match: Chile; W 45 – 29	5th-6th place match: Cuba; W 45 – 33; 5th
Carlos Jose Bravo	Individual sabre	4 V – 1 D	7th Q	Joseph Polossifakis (CAN); L 5 – 15	did not advance		
Hernan Enrique Jansen	Individual sabre	4 V – 1 D	4th Q	Julián Ayala (MEX); W 15 – 10	Daylon Diaz (CUB); W 15 – 13	Philippe Beaudry (CAN); L 3 – 15 (bronze)	did not advance
Carlos Jose Bravo; Hernan Enrique Jansen; Eliezer Rincones	Team sabre				Argentina; W 45 – 37	Canada; L 31 – 45	Bronze Medal match: Brazil; L 44 – 45

Women

Event	Athlete	Round of Poules		Round of 16	Quarterfinals	Semifinals	Final
Event	Athlete	Result	Seed	Opposition Score	Opposition Score	Opposition Score	Opposition Score
Eliana Lugo	Individual épée	3 V – 2 D	8th Q	Cáterin Bravo (CHI); W 12 – 11	Yamirka Rodriguez (CUB); L 13 – 14	did not advance	
María Gabriela Martínez	Individual épée	2 V – 3 D	14th Q	Elida Aguero (ARG); L 10 – 11	did not advance		
Eliana Lugo; María Gabriela Martínez; Patrizia Plovesan	Team épée				Mexico; L 28 – 45	5th-8th place match: Chile; L 41 – 45	7th-8th place match: Brazil; L 43 – 45; 8th
Johana Fuenmayor	Individual foil	1 V – 4 D	14th Q	Misleydys Compañi (CUB); W 15 – 4	Nataly Michel (MEX); L 7 – 15	did not advance	
Mariana Isabel Gonzalez	Individual foil	5 V – 0 D	1st Q	Amanda Simeão (BRA); W 15 – 3	Nzingha Prescot (USA); L 13 – 15	did not advance	
Johana Fuenmayor; Mariana Isabel Gonzalez; Yulitza Suarez	Team foil				Mexico; W 45 – 31	Canada; L 31 – 45	Bronze Medal match: Chile; W 45 – 23 (bronze)
Alejandra Benítez	Individual sabre	4 V – 1 D	2nd Q	Úrsula González (MEX); W 15 – 6	María Belén Pérez Maurice (ARG); W 15 – 13	Eileen Grench (PAN); W 15 – 14	Mariel Zagunis (USA); L 13 – 15 (silver)
Patricia Contreras	Individual sabre	5 V – 0 D	1st Q	Melanie Mercado (PUR); L 10 – 15	did not advance		
Alejandra Benítez; Maria Angelica Blanco; Patricia Contreras	Team sabre				Brazil; W 45 – 39	Mexico; L 41 – 45	Bronze Medal match: Dominican Republic; W 45 – 44 (bronze)

== Gymnastics ==
=== Artistic ===
Venezuela has qualified two male and six female gymnasts in the artistic gymnastics competition.

=== Men ===
Individual qualification

Athlete	Event	Apparatus						Qualification	
Athlete	Event	Floor	Pommel horse	Rings	Vault	Parallel bars	Horizontal bar	Total	Rank
Regulo Antonio Carmona	Ind Qualification			15.300				15.300	56th
Adickxon Gabriel Trejo	Ind Qualification	12.600	12.950	13.050	14.550	13.500	13.700	80.350	22nd

Individual Finals

Athlete	Event	Final							
Athlete	Event	Floor	Pommel horse	Rings	Vault	Parallel bars	Horizontal bar	Total	Rank
Adickxon Gabriel Trejo	Individual All-around	12.550	12.200	13.700	15.550	12.700	13.250	79.950	14th
Regulo Antonio Carmona	Individual Rings			14.475				14.475	5th

=== Women ===
Individual qualification & Team Finals

Athlete	Event	Apparatus				Qualification		Final	
Athlete	Event	Vault	Uneven bars	Balance Beam	Floor	Total	Rank	Total	Rank
Fanny Isabel Briceno	Ind Qualification	13.525	10.675	13.525	12.175	49.900	28th		
Yarimar Andreina Medina	Ind Qualification	13.625	12.325	12.050	12.175	50.175	26th		
Maciel Yoselin Peña	Ind Qualification	13.825	11.400	13.275	13.050	51.550	21st		
Ivet Jose Rojas	Ind Qualification	13.700	13.200	13.475	12.200	52.575	15th		
Johanny Sotillo	Ind Qualification	13.025	11.825	13.325		38.175	47th		
Team Totals; Four Best Scores	Team All-around	54.675	48.750	53.600	49.600			206.625	6th

Individual Finals

Athlete	Event	Apparatus				Final	
Athlete	Event	Vault	Uneven bars	Balance Beam	Floor	Total	Rank
Ivet Jose Rojas	Individual All-around	13.825	11.125	12.900	12.825	50.675	14th
Ivet Jose Rojas	Individual Balance Beam			12.700		12.700	6th
Maciel Yoselin Peña	Individual All-around	13.675	11.425	10.325	12.475	47.900	19th
Maciel Yoselin Peña	Individual Uneven Bars		12.550			12.550	6th

=== Rhythmic ===
Venezuela has qualified two individual gymnasts and one team in the rhythmic gymnastics competition.

Individual

Athlete	Event	Final					
Athlete	Event	Hoop	Ball	Clubs	Ribbon	Total	Rank
Andreina Acevedo	Individual	24.150	21.850	22.475	23.750	92.225	9th
Andreina Acevedo	Hoop	22.900				22.900	8th
Andreina Acevedo	Ribbon				22.625	22.625	8th
Katherin Arias	Individual	21.875	21.775	22.450	22.250	88.350	12th

Group

Athletes	Event	Final			
Athletes	Event	5 balls	3 ribbons & 2 hoops	Total	Rank
Grisbel Lopez; Leiyineth Medrano; Andrea Myerston; Michelle Sanchez; Neira Segura; Nathalia Silva	Team	22.500	20.725	43.225	5th
Grisbel Lopez; Leiyineth Medrano; Andrea Myerston; Michelle Sanchez; Neira Segura; Nathalia Silva	Group 5 Balls	22.250		22.250	5th
Grisbel Lopez; Leiyineth Medrano; Andrea Myerston; Michelle Sanchez; Neira Segura; Nathalia Silva	Group 3 Ribbons & 2 Hoops		22.425	22.425	4th

== Handball ==
Men

Team

- Ali Barranco
- Enmanuel Godoy
- Jesus Guarecuco
- Victor Alonzo Lopez
- Arturo Martinez
- Jhonny Peñaloza
- Ivan Josue Perez
- Eduardo Rodriguez
- Raul Jose Rodriguez
- Drubil Silva
- Christofer Timaure
- Ronal Timaure
- Emilio Tovar
- Juan Villalobos
- Kelwing Zambrano

Standings

Pos	Team	Pld	W	D	L	GF	GA	GD	Pts	Qualification
1	Brazil	3	3	0	0	119	54	+65	6	Semifinals
2	Chile	3	2	0	1	101	89	+12	4	Semifinals
3	Canada	3	1	0	2	70	113	−43	2	5th–8th place semifinals
4	Venezuela	3	0	0	3	68	102	−34	0	5th–8th place semifinals

Source: Guadalajara 2011
Rules for classification: 1) points; 2) head-to-head points; 3) head-to-head goal difference; 4) head-to-head goals scored; 5) goal difference; 6) goals scored; 7) draw.

Results

October 16; 15:00	Chile	37 – 28	Venezuela	San Rafael Gymnasium; Referees: Perez, Guzman (PUR)
October 16; 15:00	Feuchtmann 8	Report	Peñaloza 6	San Rafael Gymnasium; Referees: Perez, Guzman (PUR)

October 18; 20:00	Venezuela	15 – 37	Brazil	San Rafael Gymnasium; Referees: Perez, Guzman (PUR)
October 18; 20:00	two players, 3	Report	Ruy, 7	San Rafael Gymnasium; Referees: Perez, Guzman (PUR)

October 20; 15:00	Canada	28 – 25	Venezuela	San Rafael Gymnasium; Referees: De Souza, Paz (BRA)
October 20; 15:00	Etter, 10	Report	Perez, 6	San Rafael Gymnasium; Referees: De Souza, Paz (BRA)

Fifth-Eighth place matches

October 22; 20:00	Mexico	30 – 25	Venezuela	San Rafael Gymnasium; Referees: De Souza, Paz (BRA)
October 22; 20:00	Bermúdez, 8	Report	Two players, 5	San Rafael Gymnasium; Referees: De Souza, Paz (BRA)

Seventh place match

October 24; 10:00	United States	39 – 35	Venezuela	San Rafael Gymnasium; Referees: Paz, De Souza (BRA)
October 24; 10:00	Elzoghby, 7	Report	Silva, 9	San Rafael Gymnasium; Referees: Paz, De Souza (BRA)

2011 Pan American Games 8th

Venezuela

== Judo ==
Venezuela has qualified athletes in all men's categories and in six of the seven women's categories.

Men

Athlete	Event	Round of 16	Quarterfinals	Semifinals	Final
Athlete	Event	Opposition Result	Opposition Result	Opposition Result	Opposition Result
Javier Guédez	−60 kg	Antonio Betancourt (CUB); W 001 S1 – 000	Felipe Kitadai (BRA); L 001 S1 – 100	did not advance (to repechage round)	
Ricardo Valderrama	−66 kg		Anyelo Gomez (CUB); W 010 S2 – 003 S3	Kenneth Hashimoto (USA); L 001 S3 – 010 S2	did not advance (to repechage round)
Antonio Rivas	−73 kg	Lee Mata (MEX); L 000 – 100	did not advance		
Mervin Rodriguez	−81 kg	Harry St. Leger (USA); W 120 – 000 S3	Eduardo Adrian Avila (MEX); W 100 S2 – 001	Gadiel Miranda (PUR); L 001 – 010 S2	did not advance (to repechage round)
Jose Camacho	−90 kg		Isao Cardenas (MEX); L 002 S3 – 010	did not advance (to repechage round)	
Albeny Rosales	−100 kg		Sergio García (MEX); L 000 S2 – 001 S1 GS	did not advance (to repechage round)	
Eliezer Acuna	+100 kg	Ramon Enrique Flores (MEX); L 000 S4 – 100	did not advance (to repechage round)		

Repechage Rounds

Athlete	Event	Repechage 8	Repechage Final	Bronze Final
Athlete	Event	Opposition Result	Opposition Result	Opposition Result
Javier Guédez	−60 kg		Jose Ernesto Romero (ECU); L 000 – 001 S1	did not advance
Ricardo Valderrama	−66 kg			Sasha Mehmedovic (CAN); W 100 – 000 (bronze)
Mervin Rodriguez	−81 kg			Emmanuel Lucenti (ARG); L 000 – 100
Jose Camacho	−90 kg		Alexandre Emond (CAN); L 010 S1 – 100 S3	did not advance
Albeny Rosales	−100 kg		Carlos Santiago (PUR); L 000 S3 – 010 S1	did not advance
Eliezer Acuña	+100 kg	Orlando Baccino (ARG); L 000 S4 – 100	did not advance	

Women

Athlete	Event	Round of 16	Quarterfinals	Semifinals	Final
Athlete	Event	Opposition Result	Opposition Result	Opposition Result	Opposition Result
Anrriquelys Barrios	−52 kg	Andrea Cardenas (MEX); W 001 S1 – 000 S1	Oritia González (ARG); L 000 S3 – 011	did not advance (to repechage round)	
Flor Velasquez	−57 kg	Hana Carmichael (ARG); L 000 S2 – 001 S1	did not advance		
Ysis Barreto	−63 kg		Diana Velasco (COL); L 000 S2 – 003	did not advance (to repechage round)	
Keivi Pinto	−78 kg	Mirla Nolberto (GUA); L 001 – 122 S2	did not advance		
Giovanna Blanco	+78 kg		Maria Altheman (BRA); L 000 S1 – 001 S1	did not advance (to repechage round)	

Repechage Rounds

Athlete	Event	Repechage 8	Repechage Final	Bronze Final
Athlete	Event	Opposition Result	Opposition Result	Opposition Result
Anrriquelys Barrios	−52 kg		Laurie Wiltshire (CAN); L 000 S1 – 110	did not advance
Ysis Barreto	−63 kg	Yennifer Dominguez (GUA); L 002 S3 – 010 S2	did not advance	
Giovanna Blanco	+78 kg		Tanya Llamuca (ECU); W 111 – 000 S2	Vanessa Zambotti (MEX); L 000 – 100

== Karate ==
Venezuela has qualified three athletes in the 67 kg, 84 kg, and 84+kg men's categories and four athletes in the 50 kg, 61 kg, 68 kg, and 68+kg women's categories.

Athlete	Event	Round robin (Pool A/B)			Semifinals	Final
Athlete	Event	Match 1	Match 2	Match 3	Semifinals	Final
Athlete	Event	Opposition Result	Opposition Result	Opposition Result	Opposition Result	Opposition Result
Jean Carlos Peña	Men's -67 kg	Daniel Carrillo (MEX); HWK 1:1	Jesus Paucarcaja (PER); W PTS 4:0	Carlos Galan (GUA); HWK 0:0	Dennis Novo (CUB); L PTS 0:2 (bronze)	did not advance
Cesar Herrera	Men's -84 kg	Edwin Assereto (PER); HWK 0:0	Jose Hector Paz (ESA); W PTS 7:1	Jorge Pérez (DOM); W PTS 8:4	Sorin Alexandru (CAN); W PTS 3:0	Jorge Pérez (DOM); W PTS 7:5 (gold)
Angel Aponte	Men's +84 kg	Jorge Merino (ESA); W PTS 2:0	Wellington Barbosa (BRA); W PTS 1:0	Franco Recouso (ARG); W PTS 1:0	Shaun Dhillon (CAN); W PTS 2:0	Alberto A. Ramirez (MEX); W PTS 3:2 (gold)
Dougmay Camacaro	Women's -50 kg	Ana Villanueva (DOM); L PTS 0:2	Cheili Gonzalez (GUA); L PTS 0:2	Laura Contreras (MEX); L PTS 1:2	did not advance	
Daniela Suarez	Women's -61 kg	Bertha Gutierrez (MEX); L PTS 1:2	Alexandra Grande (PER); HWK 2:2	Yaremi Borzelli (PAN); W PTS 1:0	Golrokh Khalili (CAN); HWK 4:4 (bronze)	did not advance
Yoly Guillen	Women's -68 kg	Cheryl Murphy (USA); L PTS 0:1	Yadira Lira (MEX); HWK 0:0	Johanni Sierra (DOM); W PTS 2:0	Lucelia Ribeiro (BRA); L HAN 1:1 (bronze)	did not advance
Yelsy Piña	Women's +68 kg	Claudia Vera (CHI); W PTS 2:0	Olivia P. Grant (CAN); L PTS 0:3	Jeanis Colzani (BRA); HWK 0:0	did not advance	

== Modern pentathlon ==
Venezuela has qualified two male and one female pentathletes.

Men

Athlete	Event	Fencing (Épée One Touch)			Swimming (200m Freestyle)			Riding (Show Jumping)			Combined			Total Points	Final Rank
Athlete	Event	Results	Rank	MP Points	Time	Rank	MP Points	Penalties	Rank	MP Points	Time	Rank	MP Points	Total Points	Final Rank
Luis Alberto Jiménez	Men's	9 V – 15 D	6th	892	2:43.06	24th	844	88.43	9th	1188	12:50.90	18th	1920	4664	20th
Eduardo Salas	Men's	6 V – 18 D	24th	604	2:13.49	14th	1200	173.75	24th	88	16:53.21	24th	948	2840	24th

Women

Athlete	Event	Fencing (Épée One Touch)			Swimming (200m Freestyle)			Riding (Show Jumping)			Combined			Total Points	Final Rank
Athlete	Event	Results	Rank	MP Points	Time	Rank	MP Points	Penalties	Rank	MP Points	Time	Rank	MP Points	Total Points	Final Rank
Adriana Israliantz	Women's	11 V – 21 D	15th	692	2:36.47	15th	924	86.47	10th	1156	18:38.45	16th	528	3300	16th

== Racquetball ==
Venezuela has qualified three male and two female athletes in the racquetball competition.

Men

Athlete	Event	Preliminary round (2 or 3)	Round of 32	Round of 16	Quarterfinals	Semifinals	Final
Athlete	Event	Opposition Score	Opposition Score	Opposition Score	Opposition Score	Opposition Score	Opposition Score
Cesar Castillo	Singles	Juan S. Herrera (COL); W 8 – 15, 15 – 6, 11 – 6 Raul Banegas (HON); W 15 – 13, 15 – 2 Álvaro Beltrán (MEX); L 11 – 15, 11 – 15		Felipe Camacho (CRC); L 15 – 12, 10 – 15, 6 – 11	did not advance		
César Castro	Singles	Alejandro Herrera (COL); W 15 – 5, 15 – 8 Vincent Gagnon (CAN); L 7 – 15, 7 – 15; Ramon De Leon (DOM); W 15 – 6, 15 – 2		Fernando J. Rios (ECU); L WO 0 – 15, 0 – 15	did not advance		
Jorge Hirsekorn; Cesar Castillo	Doubles	Álvaro Beltrán (Mexico) Javier Moreno (MEX); L 15 – 12, 5 – 15, 0 – 1 RET; Jose D. Alvarez (Ecuador) Fernando J. Rios (ECU); W 15 – 9, 13 – 15, 11 – 9		Raul Banegas (Guatemala) Selvin Cruz (GUA); W 15 – 10, 15 – 7	Felipe Camacho (Costa Rica) Teobaldo Fumero (CRC); W 9 – 15, 15 – 11, 11 – 6	Timothy Landeryou (Canada) Kristofer Odegard (CAN); W 15 – 14, 3 – 15, 11 – 10	Álvaro Beltrán (Mexico) Javier Moreno (MEX); L 14 – 15, 4 – 15 (silver)
Jorge Hirsekorn; Cesar Castillo	Team				Colombia; L 0 – 2, 0 – 1, 2 – 0	did not advance	

Women

Athlete	Event	Preliminary round (2 or 3)	Round of 32	Round of 16	Quarterfinals	Semifinals	Final
Athlete	Event	Opposition Score	Opposition Score	Opposition Score	Opposition Score	Opposition Score	Opposition Score
Mariana Tobon	Singles	Samantha Salas (MEX); L 3 – 15, 4 – 15; Frederique Lambert (CAN); L 1 – 15, 4 – 15; Cristina Amaya (COL); L 15 – 9, 2 – 15, 9 – 11	Veronique Guillemette (ARG); W WO 15 – 0, 15 – 0	Rhonda Rajsich (USA); L 6 – 15, 5 – 15	did not advance		
Islhey Paredes	Singles	Jenny Daza (BOL); L 12 – 15, 11 – 15; Jennifer Saunders (CAN); L 6 – 15, 7 – 15; Veronique Guillemette (ARG); L 9 – 15, 10 – 15	Marie Gomar (GUA); W 14 – 15, 15 – 7, 11 – 5	Paola Longoria (MEX); L 4 – 15, 4 – 15	did not advance		
Islhey Paredes; Mariana Tobon	Doubles	Rhonda Rajsich (United States) Aimee Ruiz (USA); L 7 – 15, 7 – 15; Maria C. Cordova (Ecuador) maria P. Muñoz (ECU); L 11 – 15, 7 – 15	Josee Grand-Maitre (Canada) Brandi Jacobson (CAN); L 6 – 15, 13 – 15	did not advance			
Islhey Paredes; Mariana Tobon	Team	Argentina; W 0 – 2, 2 – 0, 2 – 1	Mexico; L 0 – 2, 0 – 2	did not advance			

== Roller skating ==
Venezuela has qualified a men's speed team in the roller skating competition.

Men

Athlete	Event	Heats		Final	
Athlete	Event	Result	Rank	Result	Rank
Felipe Castillo	300 m time-trial			26.881	11th
Daniel Afonso Alvares	Men's 1,000 m	1:28.295	4th Q	1:26.504	4th
Daniel Afonso Alvares	Men's 10,000 m			4	4th

Women

Athlete	Event	Heats		Final	
Athlete	Event	Result	Rank	Result	Rank
Sandra Buelvas	300 m time-trial			27.879	6th
Sandra Buelvas	Women's 1,000 metres	1:35.504	1st	1:35.336	2nd place, silver medalist(s)
Sindy Cortes	Women's 10,000 m			DNF	

== Rowing ==
Men

Athlete(s)	Event	Heats		Repechage		Final	
Athlete(s)	Event	Time	Rank	Time	Rank	Time	Rank
Emilio Torres	Single sculls (M1×)	7:20.46	2nd R	7:20.61	2nd Q	7:07.03	3rd place, bronze medalist(s)
Cesar Amaris; José Güipe	Double sculls (M2×)	6:51.90	4th Q			6:36.81	3rd place, bronze medalist(s)
Cesar Amaris; José Güipe; Pedro Sanz; Emilio Torres	Quadruple sculls (M4×)	6:33.67	6th			6:05.23	4th
Austin Betancourt; Irving Calles; Jose Fernandez; Andrés Mora	Lightweight coxless four (LM4-)	6:42.68	5th R	6:45.23	5th qB	6:37.90	3rd B

Women

Athlete(s)	Event	Heats		Repechage		Final	
Athlete(s)	Event	Time	Rank	Time	Rank	Time	Rank
Jenesis Perez	Single sculls (W1×)	8:44.08	3rd R	8:49.09	4th qB	8:52.46	2nd B

== Sailing ==
Venezuela has qualified five boats and six athletes in the sailing competition.

Men

Athlete	Event	Race											Net Points	Final Rank
Athlete	Event	1	2	3	4	5	6	7	8	9	10	M	Net Points	Final Rank
Daniel Flores	Sailboard	6	4	4	6	6	5	5	4	5	6	6	49	5th
Jose Ruiz	Laser	6	10	(13)	12	12	9	9	10	12	8		82	11th

Women

Athlete	Event	Race											Net Points	Final Rank
Athlete	Event	1	2	3	4	5	6	7	8	9	10	M	Net Points	Final Rank
Daniela Rivera	Laser Radial class	6	9	4	5	(12)	8	9	5	9	6		61	6th

Open

Athlete	Event	Race											Net Points	Final Rank
Athlete	Event	1	2	3	4	5	6	7	8	9	10	M	Net Points	Final Rank
Gonzalo Cendra; Yamil Saba	Hobie 16	7	1	1	2	7	7	5	(9)OCS	8	3	6	47	4th
Hugolino Colmenares	Sunfish class	6	4	8	2	(11)	3	8	9	3	9	10	62	5th

== Shooting ==
Men

Event	Athlete	Qualification		Final	
Event	Athlete	Score	Rank	Score	Rank
10 m air pistol	Felipe Beuvrín	564-15x	16th	did not advance	
10 m air pistol	Frank Bonilla	564-17x	15th	did not advance	
10 m air rifle	Julio Cesar Iemma	580-34x	15th	did not advance	
10 m air rifle	Raul Vargas	563-18x	25th	did not advance	
25 m rapid fire pistol	Franco Di Mauro	571-13x	3rd Q	590.0	3rd place, bronze medalist(s)
25 m rapid fire pistol	Douglas Gomez	558-12x	6th Q	565.0	6th
50 m pistol	Frank Bonilla	539- 6x	10th	did not advance	
50 m pistol	Marco Nuñez	532- 2x	17th	did not advance	
50 m rifle 3 positions	Julio Cesar Iemma	1145- 46x	6th Q	1239.9	8th
50 m rifle 3 positions	Raul Vargas	1124- 42x	16th	did not advance	
50 m rifle prone	Julio Cesar Iemma	585-29x	8th Q	686.6	7th
50 m rifle prone	Raul Vargas	578-21x	18th	did not advance	
Double Trap	Franco Di Mauro	122	14th	did not advance	
Double Trap	Mario Soarez	124	13th	did not advance	
Trap	Leonel Martinez	116	13th	did not advance	
Trap	Mario Soarez	113	17th	did not advance	
Skeet	Julian Pena	113	19th	did not advance	
Skeet	Victor Silva	107	26th	did not advance	

Women

Event	Athlete	Qualification		Final	
Event	Athlete	Score	Rank	Score	Rank
10 m air pistol	Editzy Pimentel	372- 7x	8th Q	476.7	2nd place, silver medalist(s)
10 m air pistol	Maribel Pineda	384- 8× PR	1st Q	463.6	8th
10 m air rifle	Diliana Méndez	388-21x	12th	did not advance	
10 m air rifle	Marlil Luisa Romero	390-24x	7th Q	489.0	8th
25 m pistol	Editzy Pimentel	567-13x	5th Q	768.4	4th
25 m pistol	Maribel Pineda	571-15x	1st Q	768.8	3rd place, bronze medalist(s)
50 m rifle 3 positions	Diliana Méndez	568-19x	5th Q	659.1	7th
50 m rifle 3 positions	Lidnimar Rebolledo	562-22x	12th	did not advance	

== Softball ==
Venezuela has qualified a team to participate. The team will be made up of 17 athletes.

Standings The top four teams will advance to the semifinal round.

Qualified for the semifinals
Eliminated

All times are Central Daylight Time (UTC−5)

Rank	Team	W	L	RS	RA
1	United States	7	0	54	6
2	Cuba	5	2	28	13
3	Venezuela	5	2	31	20
4	Canada	5	2	46	23
5	Dominican Republic	2	5	22	37
6	Mexico	2	5	18	37
7	Puerto Rico	2	5	27	42
8	Argentina	0	7	4	59

October 17, 2011; 11:00	Mexico	0 – 7	Venezuela	Pan American Softball Stadium, Guadalajara; Attendance: 600
October 17, 2011; 11:00		http://200.57.183.69/ENG/SO/SOR173A_SOW40040010100014ENG.htm		Pan American Softball Stadium, Guadalajara; Attendance: 600

October 17, 2011; 18:00	United States	10 – 0	Venezuela	Pan American Softball Stadium, Guadalajara; Attendance: 0
October 17, 2011; 18:00		http://200.57.183.69/ENG/SO/SOR173A_SOW40040010100021ENG.htm		Pan American Softball Stadium, Guadalajara; Attendance: 0

October 18, 2011; 9:00	Venezuela	8 – 1	Argentina	Pan American Softball Stadium, Guadalajara; Attendance: 150
October 18, 2011; 9:00		http://200.57.183.69/ENG/SO/SOR173A_SOW40040010100019ENG.htm		Pan American Softball Stadium, Guadalajara; Attendance: 150

October 18, 2011; 16:00	Canada	4 – 3	Venezuela	Pan American Softball Stadium, Guadalajara; Attendance: 350
October 18, 2011; 16:00		http://200.57.183.69/ENG/SO/SOR173A_SOW40040010100022ENG.htm		Pan American Softball Stadium, Guadalajara; Attendance: 350

October 19, 2011; 18:00	Venezuela	3 – 2	Cuba	Pan American Softball Stadium, Guadalajara; Attendance: 659
October 19, 2011; 18:00		http://200.57.183.69/ENG/SO/SOR173A_SOW40040010100020ENG.htm		Pan American Softball Stadium, Guadalajara; Attendance: 659

October 20, 2011; 11:00	Venezuela	3 – 10	Dominican Republic	Pan American Softball Stadium, Guadalajara; Attendance: 150
October 20, 2011; 11:00		http://200.57.183.69/ENG/SO/SOR173A_SOW40040010100003ENG.htm		Pan American Softball Stadium, Guadalajara; Attendance: 150

October 21, 2011; 13:00	Venezuela	10 – 5	Puerto Rico	Pan American Softball Stadium, Guadalajara; Attendance: 250
October 21, 2011; 13:00		http://200.57.183.69/ENG/SO/SOR173A_SOW40040010100009ENG.htm		Pan American Softball Stadium, Guadalajara; Attendance: 250

Semifinals

October 22, 2011; 16:00	Canada	11 – 1	Venezuela	Pan American Softball Stadium, Guadalajara; Attendance: 150
October 22, 2011; 16:00		http://200.57.183.69/ENG/SO/SOR173A_SOW40040030200002ENG.htm		Pan American Softball Stadium, Guadalajara; Attendance: 150

2011 Pan American Games 4th

Venezuela

== Swimming ==
Venezuela will send 27 swimmers.

Men

Athlete(s)	Event	Preliminaries		Final	
Athlete(s)	Event	Result	Rank	Result	Rank
50 m freestyle	Roberto Gomez	23.11	11th qB	23.12	4th B
100 m freestyle	Crox Acuña	50.35	10th	did not advance	
100 m freestyle	Cristian Quintero	49.87	7th Q	49.75	7th
200 m freestyle	Cristian Quintero	1:50.67	4th Q	1:49.44	6th
200 m freestyle	Daniele Tirabassi	1:50.96	6th Q	1:52.31	8th
400 m freestyle	Cristian Quintero	3:56.67	2nd Q	3:52.51	3rd place, bronze medalist(s)
400 m freestyle	Alejandro Gómez	3:57.18	4th Q	3:56.28	6th
1500 m freestyle	Alejandro Gómez	15:40.75	6th Q	15:44.03	6th
1500 m freestyle	Ricardo Monasterio	15:50.65	8th Q	16:05.64	8th
100 m Backstroke	Luis Rojas	57.61	8th Q	57.54	7th
200 m Backstroke	Luis Rojas	2:05.21	7th Q	2:06.07	6th
100 m Breaststroke	Carlos Claverie	1:05.80	18th	did not advance	
200 m breaststroke	Leopoldo Andara	DSQ		did not advance	
100 m Butterfly	Octavio Alesi	54.51	9th qB	54.15	1st B
100 m Butterfly	Albert Subirats	53.84	5th Q	52.37	1st place, gold medalist(s)
200 m Butterfly	Marcos Lavado	2:01.33	6th Q	2:01.62	5th
200 m Butterfly	Alexis Marquez	2:02.58	10th qB	2:02.99	2nd B
200 m Individual Medley	Luis Rojas	2:08.17	9th qB	2:09.22	1st B
400 m Individual Medley	Eddy Marin	4:38.88	9th qB	4:40.08	2nd B
4 × 100 m freestyle relay	Crox Acuña; Octavio Alesi; Cristian Quintero; Albert Subirats; Luis Rojas*; Roberto Gomez*; Daniele Tirabassi*	3:27.20	3rd Q	3:19.92	3rd place, bronze medalist(s)
4 × 200 m freestyle relay	Crox Acuña; Marcos Lavado; Cristian Quintero; Daniele Tirabassi; Eddy Marin*; Ricardo Monasterio*; Alejandro Gómez*	7:39.64	4th Q	7:23.41	3rd place, bronze medalist(s)
4 × 100 m medley relay	Luis Rojas; Carlos Claverie; Cristian Quintero; Alexis Marquez; Crox Acuña*	3:52.10	6th Q	3:47.88	7th
10 km	Erwin Maldonado			1:58:21.5	6th
10 km	Angel Moreira			2:03:13.6	9th

- Swimmers who participated in the heats only.

Women

Athlete(s)	Event	Preliminaries		Final	
Athlete(s)	Event	Result	Rank	Result	Rank
50 m Freestyle	Arlene Semeco	25.58	4th Q	25.57	5th
50 m Freestyle	Ximena Vilar	26.84	13th qB	26.80	5th B
100 m Freestyle	Wendy Rodriguez	58.14	12th qB	58.03	3rd B
100 m Freestyle	Arlene Semeco	56.69	7th Q	55.43	3rd place, bronze medalist(s)
200 m Freestyle	Andreina Pinto	2:03.15	4th Q	2:00.79	3rd place, bronze medalist(s)
200 m Freestyle	Yanel Pinto	2:04.38	5th Q	2:03.92	5th
400 m Freestyle	Andreina Pinto	4:16.12	1st Q	4:11.81	2nd place, silver medalist(s)
400 m Freestyle	Yanel Pinto	4:22.56	9th qB	4:20.13	2nd B
800 m Freestyle	Andreina Pinto	8:49.81	3rd Q	8:44.55	3rd place, bronze medalist(s)
800 m Freestyle	Yanel Pinto	9:03.62	7th Q	9:07.73	8th
100 m Backstroke	Jeserik Pinto	1:05.27	13th qB	1:05.38	7th B
200 m Backstroke	Elimar Barrios	2:20.96	7th Q	2:21.40	7th
200 m Backstroke	Erika Tolleras	2:26.16	13th qB	2:25.17	6th B
100 m Breaststroke	Mercedes Toledo	1:13.20	11th qB	1:12.54	4th B
100 m Breaststroke	Daniela Victoria	1:13.17	10th qB	1:12.31	3rd B
200 m Breaststroke	Daniela Victoria	2:42.02	12th qB	2:38.52	1st B
100 m Butterfly	Elimar Barrios	1:03.25	11th qB	1:03.63	6th B
100 m Butterfly	Erika Torellas	1:01.82	8th Q	1:01.56	8th
200 m Butterfly	Eliana Barrios	2:17.06	6th Q	2:18.19	7th
200 m Individual Medley	Daniela Victoria	2:22.04	7th Q	2:22.67	8th
200 m Individual Medley	Eliana Barrios	2:25.97	12th qB	2:25.01	4th B
400 m Individual Medley	Daniela Victoria	DNS		did not advance	
400 m Individual Medley	Eliana Barrios	5:07.70	10th qB	5:04.10	3rd B
4 × 100 m freestyle relay	Jeserik Pinto; Wendy Rodriguez; Erika Torellas; Arlene Semeco; Mercedes Toledo*; Ximena Vilar*	3:54.34	5th Q	3:48.55	4th
4 × 200 m freestyle relay	Yanel Pinto; Darneyis Orozco; Yennifer Marquez; Andreina Pinto; Eddy Marin*; Elimar Barrios*; Jeserik Pinto*	8:30.58	3rd Q	8:19.20	4th
4 × 100 m medley relay	Jeserik Pinto; Daniela Victoria; Erika Torellas; Arlene Semeco; Elimar Barrios*; Mercedes Toledo*; Eliana Barrios*; Wendy Rodriguez*	4:20.85	5th Q	4:18.76	7th
10 km	Yanel Pinto			2:06:57.2	9th

- Swimmers who participated in the heats only.

== Synchronized swimming ==
Venezuela has qualified one pair of athletes to compete in the duet synchronized swimming competition.

Athletes	Event	Technical Routine		Free Routine (Final)			
Athletes	Event	Points	Rank 1	Points	Rank	Total Points	Rank
Rosamaria Avila; Fredmary Zambrano	Women's duet	75.125	7th	76.200	7th	151.325	7th

== Table tennis ==
Venezuela has qualified three male and three female athletes in the table tennis competition.

Men

Athlete	Event	Round robin			Round of 32	Round of 16	Quarterfinals	Semifinals	Final
Athlete	Event	Match 1	Match 2	Match 3	Round of 32	Round of 16	Quarterfinals	Semifinals	Final
Athlete	Event	Opposition Result	Opposition Result	Opposition Result	Opposition Result	Opposition Result	Opposition Result	Opposition Result	Opposition Result
Henry Mujica	Singles	Dino Suarez (ECU); W 4 – 1	Gustavo Tsuboi (BRA); L 1 – 4	Alexander Echavarria (COL); L 3 – 4	did not advance				
Marco Navas	Singles	Hector Gatica (GUA); L 3 – 4	Liu Song (ARG); L 0 – 4	Alejandro Rodríguez (CHI); W 4 – 2	Yiyong Fan (USA); W 4 – 2	Thiago Monteiro (BRA); L 1 – 4	did not advance		
Jonathan Pino	Singles	Saul Bonilla (ESA); W 4 – 1	Thiago Monteiro (BRA); L 3 – 4	Felipe Olivares (CHI); L 3 – 4	did not advance				
Henry Mujica; Marco Navas; Jonathan Pino	Team	Cuba; L 1 – 3, 2 – 3, 0 – 3	El Salvador; W 3 – 2, 3 – 1, 3 – 0				Argentina; L 1 – 3, 2 – 3, 0 – 3	did not advance	

Women

Athlete	Event	Round robin			Round of 16	Quarterfinals	Semifinals	Final
Athlete	Event	Match 1	Match 2	Match 3	Round of 16	Quarterfinals	Semifinals	Final
Athlete	Event	Opposition Result	Opposition Result	Opposition Result	Opposition Result	Opposition Result	Opposition Result	Opposition Result
Ruaida Ezzeddine	Singles	Analdy Lopez (GUA); W 4 – 0	Ariel Hsing (USA); L 0 – 4	Rheann Chung (TRI); W 4 – 2	Yadira Silva (MEX); L 0 – 4	did not advance		
Luisana Perez	Singles	Jerica Marrero (PUR); L 2 – 4	Paulina Vega (CHI); L 1 – 4	Andrea Estrada (GUA); L 3 – 4	did not advance			
Fabiola Ramos	Singles	Angela Mori (PER); W 4 – 0	Johana Araque (COL); W 4 – 0	Judith Morales (CHI); W 4 – 1	Johenny Valdez (DOM); W 4 – 0	Lily Zhang (USA); L 0 – 4	did not advance	
Ruaida Ezzeddine; Luisana Perez; Fabiola Ramos	Team	Colombia; W 3 – 2, 0 – 3, 3 – 1, 3 – 0	El Salvador; W 3 – 1, 3 – 2, 2 – 3, 3 – 1		Cuba; W 2 – 3, 3 – 1, 3 – 1, 0 – 3, 3 – 1	United States; W 0 – 3, 3 – 0, 3 – 1, 1 – 3, 3 – 0	Dominican Republic; L 0 – 3, 2 – 3, 3 – 0, 3 – 0, 0 – 3 (silver)	

== Taekwondo ==
Venezuela has qualified four athletes in the 58 kg, 68 kg, 80 kg and 80+kg men's categories and two athletes in the 57 kg and 67 kg women's categories.

Men

Athlete	Event	Round of 16	Quarterfinals	Semifinals	Final
Athlete	Event	Opposition Result	Opposition Result	Opposition Result	Opposition Result
Mario Leal	Flyweight (-58kg)	Óscar Muñoz (COL); L 1 – 7	did not advance		
Danny Miranda	Lightweight (-68kg)	Terrence Jennings (USA); L 11 – 13	did not advance		
Carlos Vásquez	Middleweight (-80kg)	Lenn Hipolyte (TRI); W 15 – 3	Carlos Liebig (CHI); W 14 – 3	Uriel Adriano (MEX); W 9 – 8	Sebastian Crismanich (ARG); L 9 – 12 (silver)
Juan Carlos Diaz	Heavyweight (+80kg)	Marvin Sellas (PUR); W WDR Ronda 3 2:00	Kristopher Moitland (CRC); W 7 – 6	Stephen Lambdin (USA); W 7 – 3	Robelis Despaigne (CUB); L 5 – 15 (silver)

Women

Athlete	Event	Round of 16	Quarterfinals	Semifinals	Final
Athlete	Event	Opposition Result	Opposition Result	Opposition Result	Opposition Result
Katherinn Reyes	Lightweight (-57kg)	Irma Contreras (MEX); L 2 – 13	did not advance		
Adanys Cordero	Middleweight (-67kg)	Raphaella Pereira (BRA); L 1 – 2	did not advance		

== Tennis ==
Men

Athlete	Event	1st Round	Round of 32	Round of 16	Quarterfinals	Semifinals	Final
Athlete	Event	Opposition Score	Opposition Score	Opposition Score	Opposition Score	Opposition Score	Opposition Score
Luisi Piero	Singles	Iván Miranda (PER); L 2 – 6, 7 – 6(5), 0 – 2 RET	did not advance				
Luis Martinez	Singles	Iván Endara (ECU); L 6(3) – 7, 7 – 5, 4 – 6	did not advance				
Román Recarte	Singles	Olivier Sajous (HAI); L 4 – 6, 6 – 2, 1 – 6	did not advance				
Luisi Piero; Luis Martinez	Men Doubles			Júlio César Campozano (ECU); Roberto Quiroz (ECU); L 3 – 6, 5 – 7	did not advance		

Women

Athlete	Event	1st Round	Round of 16	Quarterfinals	Semifinals	Final	
Athlete	Event	Opposition Score	Opposition Score	Opposition Score	Opposition Score	Opposition Score	Opposition Score
Andrea Gámiz	Singles	Irina Falconi (USA); L 3 – 6, 3 – 6	did not advance				
Adriana Pérez	Singles	Mailen Auroux (ARG); W 6 – 3, 5 – 7, 6 – 0	Monica Puig (PUR); L 0 – 6, 5 – 7	did not advance			

Mixed

Athlete	Event	1st Round	Quarterfinals	Semifinals	Final
Athlete	Event	Opposition Score	Opposition Score	Opposition Score	Opposition Score
Adriana Pérez; Román Recarte	Mixed Doubles	Mailen Auroux (ARG); Facundo Arguello (ARG); W 4 – 6, 6 – 1, [10-8]	Andrea Kock-Benvenuto (CHI); Guillermo Rivera (CHI); L 4 – 6, 6 – 3, [8-10]	Bronze medal match: Ana Clara Duarte (BRA); Rogério Dutra (BRA); L 6(4) – 7, 7 – 5, [9-11]	

== Triathlon ==
American

Men

Athlete	Event	Swim (1.5 km)	Trans 1	Bike (40 km)	Trans 2	Run (10 km)	Total	Rank
Leandro Lobo	Individual	18:14; 4th	0:30; 37th	57:21; 20th	0:16 =15th	38:43; 22nd	1:55:06	22nd
Carlos Fisher	Individual	19:26; 26th	0:26; 27th	1:04:17; 29th	0:21; 31st	39:51; 28th	2:03:58	29th
Carlos Perez	Individual	18:41; 21st	0:26; 24th	1:04:38; 31st	0:22; 33rd	41:44; 31st	2:05:54	31st

Women

Athlete	Event	Swim (1.5 km)	Trans 1	Bike (40 km)	Trans 2	Run (10 km)	Total	Rank
Rosemary Lopez	Individual	20:44; 11th	0:28; 19th	DNF				

== Volleyball ==
Men

Squad

- Luis Arias
- Daniel Artega
- Jesus Chourio
- Josher Contreras
- Daniel Escobar
- Ivan Marquez
- Hector Mata
- Maximo Montoya
- Carlos Paez
- Angel Petit
- Kervin Piñeura
- Emerson Rodríguez

Pos	Team	Pld	W	L	Pts	SPW	SPL	SPR	SW	SL	SR	Qualification
1	Cuba	3	3	0	13	257	224	1.147	9	2	4.500	Semifinals
2	Argentina	3	2	1	8	331	331	1.000	8	7	1.143	Quarterfinals
3	Mexico	3	1	2	6	271	278	0.975	5	7	0.714	Quarterfinals
4	Venezuela	3	0	3	3	266	292	0.911	3	9	0.333	

Date		Score		Set 1	Set 2	Set 3	Set 4	Set 5	Total	Report
Oct 24	Venezuela	1–3	Mexico	23–25	20–25	28–26	21–25		92–101	Report
Oct 25	Cuba	3–0	Venezuela	25-20	25-21	25-17			75-58	Report
Oct 26	Argentina	3–2	Venezuela	25-23	21-25	29-27	23-25	18-16	116-116	Report

Fifth to eighth place classification

Date		Score		Set 1	Set 2	Set 3	Set 4	Set 5	Total	Report
Oct 28	United States	3–2	Venezuela	21–25	25–17	21–25	25–18	15–13	107–98	Report

Seventh place match

Date		Score		Set 1	Set 2	Set 3	Set 4	Set 5	Total	Report
Oct 29	Venezuela	2–3	Puerto Rico	23–25	19–25	25–19	25–21	8–15	100–105	Report

2011 Pan American Games 8th

Venezuela

== Water polo ==
=== Men ===
Team

- Victor Bautista
- Simon Botto
- Eduardo Vortez
- Douglas Espinioza
- Isaias Fernandez
- Jimmy Ferraz
- Joaquin Lopez
- Jorge Henriquez
- Carlos Linares
- Oliver Lopez
- Antonio Pirela
- Pedro Polanco
- Erick Rodulfo

The men's team will compete in Group B.

Team	GP	W	D	L	GF	GA	GD	Pts
United States	3	3	0	0	37	15	+22	6
Brazil	3	2	0	1	34	26	+8	4
Argentina	3	1	0	2	23	30	-7	2
Venezuela	3	0	0	3	20	43	-23	0

October 23, 2011; 14:30	Report	United States	16–3	Venezuela	Scotiabank Aquatics Center, Guadalajara; Referees: Dykman (CAN) and Callejas (MEX)
October 23, 2011; 14:30	Report	Score by quarters: 7 – 0, 5 – 2, 3 – 1, 1 – 0			Scotiabank Aquatics Center, Guadalajara; Referees: Dykman (CAN) and Callejas (MEX)
October 23, 2011; 14:30	Report	Hutten 4	Goals	3 players, 1	Scotiabank Aquatics Center, Guadalajara; Referees: Dykman (CAN) and Callejas (MEX)

October 24, 2011; 17:00	Report	Argentina	8–7	Venezuela	Scotiabank Aquatics Center, Guadalajara; Referees: Mejia (MEX), Burt (CAN)
October 24, 2011; 17:00	Report	Score by quarters: 2 – 1, 4 – 0, 1 – 2, 1 – 4			Scotiabank Aquatics Center, Guadalajara; Referees: Mejia (MEX), Burt (CAN)
October 24, 2011; 17:00	Report	Yañez 3	Goals	Fernandez 3	Scotiabank Aquatics Center, Guadalajara; Referees: Mejia (MEX), Burt (CAN)

October 25, 2011; 17:00	Report	Venezuela	10–19	Brazil	Scotiabank Aquatics Center, Guadalajara; Referees: Stampalija (CRO), Callejas (MEX)
October 25, 2011; 17:00	Report	Score by quarters: 1 – 2, 4 – 5, 5 – 6, 0 – 6			Scotiabank Aquatics Center, Guadalajara; Referees: Stampalija (CRO), Callejas (MEX)
October 25, 2011; 17:00	Report	3 players, 2	Goals	Emilio Vieira 4	Scotiabank Aquatics Center, Guadalajara; Referees: Stampalija (CRO), Callejas (MEX)

Elimination stage

Crossover

October 27, 2011; 14:00	Report	Venezuela	5–7	Mexico	Scotiabank Aquatics Center, Guadalajara
October 27, 2011; 14:00	Report	Score by quarters: 2–1, 2–3, 1–1, 0–2			Scotiabank Aquatics Center, Guadalajara

Seventh place match

October 29, 2011; 12:30	Report	Colombia	11–9	Venezuela	Scotiabank Aquatics Center, Guadalajara
October 29, 2011; 12:30	Report	Score by quarters: 2–0, 3–5, 1–1, 5–3			Scotiabank Aquatics Center, Guadalajara
October 29, 2011; 12:30	Report	Bejarano 3	Goals	Fernandez 3	Scotiabank Aquatics Center, Guadalajara

2011 Pan American Games 8th

Venezuela

=== Women ===
Team

- Gregory Aguilar
- Patsy Alas
- Yineldy Araujo
- Alexandra Carangelo
- Bredy Contreras
- Ariadna Fernandez
- Rocio Galue
- Lorena Godoy
- Poema Juliao
- Soleilyn Martinez
- Franjelis Pitter
- Mildre Ramirez
- Stephany Rivero

The women's team will compete in Group A.

Team	GP	W	D	L	GF	GA	GD	Pts
Canada	3	3	0	0	54	15	+39	6
Brazil	3	2	0	1	22	21	+1	4
Mexico	3	1	0	2	31	33	-2	2
Venezuela	3	0	0	3	12	50	-38	0

October 23, 2011; 12:15	Report	Venezuela	2–23	Canada	Scotiabank Aquatics Center, Guadalajara; Referees: Madera (CUB), Lopez (COL)
October 23, 2011; 12:15	Report	Score by quarters: 1 – 5, 0 – 6, 1 – 6, 0 – 6			Scotiabank Aquatics Center, Guadalajara; Referees: Madera (CUB), Lopez (COL)
October 23, 2011; 12:15	Report	Alas, Galue, 1	Goals	Alogbo, 5	Scotiabank Aquatics Center, Guadalajara; Referees: Madera (CUB), Lopez (COL)

October 24, 2011; 11:00	Report	Venezuela	7–17	Mexico	Scotiabank Aquatics Center, Guadalajara; Referees: Valcarce (ARG), Maretzki (USA)
October 24, 2011; 11:00	Report	Score by quarters: 1 – 5, 3 – 5, 2 – 3, 1 – 4			Scotiabank Aquatics Center, Guadalajara; Referees: Valcarce (ARG), Maretzki (USA)
October 24, 2011; 11:00	Report	Alas 2	Goals	Orozco 5	Scotiabank Aquatics Center, Guadalajara; Referees: Valcarce (ARG), Maretzki (USA)

October 25, 2011; 9:45	Report	Brazil	10–3	Venezuela	Scotiabank Aquatics Center, Guadalajara; Referees: Bohm (AHO), Menendez (CUB)
October 25, 2011; 9:45	Report	Score by quarters: 4 – 0, 2 – 2, 2 – 0, 2 – 1			Scotiabank Aquatics Center, Guadalajara; Referees: Bohm (AHO), Menendez (CUB)
October 25, 2011; 9:45	Report	Oliveira, Beer 2	Goals	Alas 2	Scotiabank Aquatics Center, Guadalajara; Referees: Bohm (AHO), Menendez (CUB)

Elimination stage

Crossover

October 26, 2011; 12:30	Report	Venezuela	6–11	Puerto Rico	Scotiabank Aquatics Center, Guadalajara; Referees: Dykman (CAN), Madera (CUB)
October 26, 2011; 12:30	Report	Score by quarters: 0 – 2, 2 – 3, 2 – 3, 2 – 3			Scotiabank Aquatics Center, Guadalajara; Referees: Dykman (CAN), Madera (CUB)
October 26, 2011; 12:30	Report	6 players, 1	Goals	Medina, Ortiz 3	Scotiabank Aquatics Center, Guadalajara; Referees: Dykman (CAN), Madera (CUB)

Seventh place match

October 28, 2011; 12:30	Report	Venezuela	6–8 (OT)	Argentina	Scotiabank Aquatics Center, Guadalajara; Referees: Maretzki (USA), Lopez (COL)
October 28, 2011; 12:30	Report	Score by quarters: 2 – 2, 1 – 2, 1 – 2, 2 – 0 OT: 0 – 2			Scotiabank Aquatics Center, Guadalajara; Referees: Maretzki (USA), Lopez (COL)
October 28, 2011; 12:30	Report	Carangelo 3	Goals	De Virgilio 3	Scotiabank Aquatics Center, Guadalajara; Referees: Maretzki (USA), Lopez (COL)

2011 Pan American Games 8th

Venezuela

== Weightlifting ==
Athlete	Event	Snatch			Clean & Jerk			Total	Rank
Athlete	Event	Attempt 1	Attempt 2	Attempt 3	Attempt 1	Attempt 2	Attempt 3	Total	Rank
Jesús López	Men's 62 kg	~~125~~	125	130	~~160~~	160	166	296	2nd place, silver medalist(s)
Israel Rubio	Men's 69 kg	138	142	145	165	170	173	318 PR	1st place, gold medalist(s)
Junior Sánchez	Men's 69 kg	138	142	145	165	~~170~~	~~170~~	310 PR	2nd place, silver medalist(s)
José Ocando	Men's 77 kg	135	140	~~145~~	DNF				
Herbys Márquez	Men's 94 kg	155	159	162	192	198	203	365	2nd place, silver medalist(s)
Julio Cesar Luna	Men's 105 kg	165	170	~~175~~	~~210~~	210	~~216~~	380	2nd place, silver medalist(s)
Yoel José Morales	Men's +105 kg	~~164~~	164	168	215	220	225	393	2nd place, silver medalist(s)
Betsi Rivas	Women's 48 kg	73	~~75~~	~~75~~	92	94	96	169	2nd place, silver medalist(s)
Inmara Henrriquez	Women's 53 kg	~~80~~	80	~~83~~	107	~~109~~	109	189	2nd place, silver medalist(s)
Maria Alvarez	Women's 75 kg	100	~~102~~	~~102~~	120	125	128	228	3rd place, bronze medalist(s)
Yarvanis Herrera	Women's 75 kg	104	~~106~~	~~106~~	119	123	~~126~~	227	4th
Yaniuska Espinoza	Women's +75 kg	~~105~~	105	109	133	136	~~139~~	245	2nd place, silver medalist(s)

== Wrestling ==
Venezuela has qualified six athletes in the 55 kg, 60 kg, 66 kg, 74 kg, 84 kg, and 96 kg men's freestyle categories, six athletes in the 55 kg, 60 kg, 66 kg, 84 kg, 96 kg, and 120 kg men's Greco-Roman categories, and three athletes in the 55 kg, 63 kg, and 72 kg women's freestyle categories.

Men

Freestyle

Athlete	Event	Round of 16	Quarterfinals	Semifinals	Final
Athlete	Event	Opposition Result	Opposition Result	Opposition Result	Opposition Result
Fernando Paredes	55 kg		Juan Valverde (ECU); L PP 1 – 3	did not advance	
Wilfredo Henriquez	60 kg	Yowlys Bonne (CUB); L PP 1 – 3	did not advance		
Elvis Fuentes	66 kg		Fernando Carranza (ARG); W ST 4 – 0	Pedro Soto (PUR); L PO 0 – 3	Bronze Medal match: Yoan Blanco (ECU); L PO 0 – 3
Ricardo Roberty	74 kg		Rosalio Medrano (COL); W SP 4 – 1	Jordan Burroughs (USA); L PP 1 – 3	Bronze Medal match: Jose Mercado (ECU); W PO 3 – 0 (bronze)
Jose Diaz	84 kg		Alejandro Gallardo (MEX); W PO 3 – 0	Jacob Herbert (USA); L PP 1 – 3	Bronze Medal match: Jaime Espinal (PUR); W PP 3 – 1 (bronze)
Luis Vivenes	96 kg		Marcos Santos (PUR); W PP 3 – 1	Juan Esteban Martínez (COL); W PO 3 – 0	Jacob Varner (USA); L PO 0 – 3 (silver)

Greco-Roman

Athlete	Event	Round of 16	Quarterfinals	Semifinals	Final
Athlete	Event	Opposition Result	Opposition Result	Opposition Result	Opposition Result
Jorge Cardozo	55 kg		Cristhian Paravecino (PER); W PO 3 – 0	Francisco Encarnacion (DOM); W PO 3 – 0	Gustavo Balart (CUB); L PP 1 – 3 (silver)
German Diaz	60 kg		Yesid Meneses (COL); W PP 3 – 1	Hanser Meoque (CUB); W PP 3 – 1	Joseph Betermann (USA); W PO 3 – 0 (gold)
Manuel Torres	66 kg		Ulises Barragan (MEX); L PO 0 – 3	did not advance	
Yorgen Cova	84 kg		Erick Feunekes (CAN); W PO 3 – 0	Cristhian Mosquera (COL); L PO 0 – 3	Bronze Medal match: Marcelo Gomes (BRA); W PO 3 – 0 (bronze)
Erwin Caraballo	96 kg		Yunior Estrada (CUB) 'L PP 0 – 31		Bronze Medal match: Panaglotys Gounaridis (USA); W PO 3 – 0 (bronze)
Rafael Barreno	120 kg		Romel Maza (ECU); W PO 3 – 0	Víctor Asprilla (COL); W PO 3 – 0	Mijaín López (CUB); L ST 0 – 4 (silver)

Women

Freestyle

Athlete	Event	Quarterfinals	Semifinals	Final
Athlete	Event	Opposition Result	Opposition Result	Opposition Result
Marcia Andrades	55 kg	Alma Valencia (MEX); W PO 3 – 0	Helen Maroulis (USA); L PO 0 – 3	Bronze Medal match: Joice Da Silva (BRA); L PO 0 – 3
Gloria Zavala	63 kg	Elena Pirozhkov (USA); L VT 0 – 5		Bronze Medal match: Sandra Roa (COL); L VT 0 – 5
Jaramit Weffer	63 kg	Diana Crisanto (MEX); W PO 3 – 0	Lisset Hechevarria (CUB); L PO 0 – 3	Bronze Medal match: BYE (bronze)
