= Fencing at the 2011 Pan American Games – Women's team sabre =

Women's team sabre at the 2011 Pan American Games
- Venue: Multipurpose Gymnasium
- Dates: October 28
- Competitors: 31 from 8 nations

Medalists
Gold medal	Ibtihaj Muhammad; Mariel Zagunis; Dagmara Wozniak; Lindsay Campbell	United States
Silver medal	Úrsula González; Angelica Aguilar; Angélica Larios; Alejandra Terán	Mexico
Bronze medal	Alejandra Benítez; Yulitza Suarez; Maria Blanco; Patricia Contreras	Venezuela

The women's team sabre competition of the fencing events at the 2011 Pan American Games in Guadalajara, Mexico, was held on October 28 at the Multipurpose Gymnasium. The defending champion was the team from Cuba.

The team sabre competition consisted of a three-round single-elimination bracket with a bronze medal match between the two semifinal losers and classification semifinals and finals for 5th to 8th places. Teams consist of three members each. Matches consist of nine bouts, with every fencer on one team facing each fencer on the other team. Scoring carried over between bouts with a total of 45 touches being the team goal. Bouts lasted until one team reached the target multiple of 5 touches. For example, if the first bout ended with a score of 5–3, that score would remain into the next bout and the second bout would last until one team reached 10 touches. Bouts also had a maximum time of three minutes each; if the final bout ended before either team reached 45 touches, the team leading at that point won. A tie at that point would result in an additional one-minute sudden-death time period. This sudden-death period was further modified by the selection of a draw-winner beforehand; if neither fencer scored a touch during the minute, the predetermined draw-winner won the bout.

== Schedule ==
All times are Central Standard Time (UTC−6).

Date	Time	Round
October 28, 2011	13:20	Quarterfinals
October 28, 2011	14:50	Fifth to eighth
October 28, 2011	15:00	Semifinals
October 28, 2011	16:30	Fifth place
October 28, 2011	16:30	Bronze medal match
October 28, 2011	20:40	Final

== Draw ==
=== Finals ===
Quarterfinals
1	United States	45
8	Cuba	36
5	Dominican Republic	45
4	Argentina	44
3	Venezuela	45
6	Brazil	39
7	Panama	24
2	Mexico	45

Semifinals
1	United States	45
5	Dominican Republic	12
3	Venezuela	41
2	Mexico	45

Final
1	United States	45
2	Mexico	29
Third place
5	Dominican Republic	44
3	Venezuela	45

=== Classification 5 – 8 ===
Classification
8	Cuba	45
4	Argentina	28
6	Brazil	45
7	Panama	38

Fifth place
8	Cuba	45
6	Brazil	29
Seventh place
5	Argentina	45
7	Panama	25

== Final classification ==
Rank	Team	Athlete
1st place, gold medalist(s)	United States	Ibtihaj Muhammad; Mariel Zagunis; Dagmara Wozniak; Lindsay Campbell
2nd place, silver medalist(s)	Mexico	Úrsula González; Angelica Aguilar; Angélica Larios; Alejandra Terán
3rd place, bronze medalist(s)	Venezuela	Alejandra Benítez; Yulitza Suarez; Maria Blanco; Patricia Contreras
4	Dominican Republic	Rossy Félix; Maybelline Johnson; Heyddys Valentin; Carmen Nuñez
5	Cuba	Yaritza Goulet; Jennifer Morales; Yexi Salazar; Misleydys Compañi
6	Brazil	Beatriz Almeida; Karina Lakerbai; Élora Pattaro; Amanda Simeão
7	Argentina	Adriana Attar; Estefania Berninsone; Maria Perez; Clara Di Tella
8	Panama	Ana Batista; Jacqueline De Roux; Eileen Grench
