= Fencing at the 2011 Pan American Games – Men's team épée =

Men's team épée at the 2011 Pan American Games
- Venue: Multipurpose Gymnasium
- Dates: October 27
- Competitors: 32 from 8 nations

Medalists
| Gold medal | Soren Thompson; Weston Kelsey; Cody Mattern; Gerek Meinhardt | United States |
| Silver medal | Silvio Fernandez; Francisco Limardo; Ruben Limardo; Jhon Perez | Venezuela |
| Bronze medal | Tigran Bajgoric; Igor Gantsevich; Vincent Pelletier; Etienne Turbide | Canada |

The men's team épée competition of the fencing events at the 2011 Pan American Games in Guadalajara, Mexico, was held on October 27 at the Multipurpose Gymnasium. The defending champion was the team from Cuba.

The team épée competition consisted of a four-round single-elimination bracket with a bronze medal match between the two semifinal losers and classification semifinals and finals for 5th to 8th places. Teams consist of three members each. Matches consist of nine bouts, with every fencer on one team facing each fencer on the other team. Scoring carried over between bouts with a total of 45 touches being the team goal. Bouts lasted until one team reached the target multiple of 5 touches. For example, if the first bout ended with a score of 5-3, that score would remain into the next bout and the second bout would last until one team reached 10 touches. Bouts also had a maximum time of three minutes each; if the final bout ended before either team reached 45 touches, the team leading at that point won. A tie at that point would result in an additional one-minute sudden-death time period. This sudden-death period was further modified by the selection of a draw-winner beforehand; if neither fencer scored a touch during the minute, the predetermined draw-winner won the bout.

== Schedule ==
All times are Central Standard Time (UTC-6).

| Date | Time | Round |
|---|---|---|
| October 27, 2011 | 8:30 | Quarterfinals |
| October 27, 2011 | 10:10 | Fifth to eighth |
| October 27, 2011 | 10:20 | Semifinals |
| October 27, 2011 | 11:50 | Seventh place |
| October 27, 2011 | 11:50 | Fifth place |
| October 27, 2011 | 11:50 | Bronze medal match |
| October 27, 2011 | 19:00 | Final |

== Draw ==
=== Finals ===
Quarterfinals
1 | United States | 45
8 | El Salvador | 27
5 | Colombia | 38
4 | Chile | 40
3 | Canada | 45
6 | Mexico | 28
7 | Cuba | 40
2 | Venezuela | 45

Semifinals
1 | United States | 45
4 | Chile | 26
3 | Canada | 39
2 | Venezuela | 40

Final
1 | United States | 42
2 | Venezuela | 25
Third place
4 | Chile | 27
3 | Canada | 45

=== Classification 5 – 8 ===
Classification
5 | El Salvador | 38
8 | Colombia | 45
6 | Mexico | 34
7 | Cuba | 45

Fifth place
5 | Colombia | 34
7 | Cuba | 45
Seventh place
8 | El Salvador | 32
6 | Mexico | 45

== Final classification ==
| Rank | Team | Athlete |
|---|---|---|
| 1st place, gold medalist(s) | United States | Soren Thompson; Weston Kelsey; Cody Mattern; Gerek Meinhardt |
| 2nd place, silver medalist(s) | Venezuela | Silvio Fernandez; Francisco Limardo; Ruben Limardo; Jhon Perez |
| 3rd place, bronze medalist(s) | Canada | Tigran Bajgoric; Igor Gantsevich; Vincent Pelletier; Etienne Turbide |
| 4 | Chile | Paris Inostroza; Klaus Nickel; Rolf Nickel; Felipe Alvear |
| 5 | Cuba | Reynier Henriquez; Ringo Quintero; Yunior Reytor; Yosniel Alvarez |
| 6 | Colombia | Andrés Campos; Gustavo Coqueco; Jhon Rodriguez; Carlos Valencia |
| 7 | Mexico | Omar Carrillo; Mauricio Lara; Gabriel Ochoa; Raul Arizaga |
| 8 | El Salvador | Lucas Hernandez; David Ramirez; Gerson Ramirez; Rodrigo Casamalhuapa |
