= Fencing at the 2011 Pan American Games – Men's épée =

Men's épée at the 2011 Pan American Games
- Venue: Multipurpose Gymnasium
- Dates: October 24
- Competitors: 18 from 10 nations

Medalists
Gold medal	Weston Kelsey	United States
Silver medal	Ruben Limardo	Venezuela
Bronze medal	Silvio Fernández	Venezuela
Bronze medal	Reynier Henriquez	Cuba

The men's épée competition of the fencing events at the 2011 Pan American Games in Guadalajara, Mexico, was held on October 24 at the Multipurpose Gymnasium. The defending champion was Andrés Carrillo from Cuba.

The épée competition consisted of a qualification round followed by a single-elimination bracket with a bronze medal match between the two semifinal losers. Fencing was done to 15 touches or to the completion of three three-minute rounds if neither fencer reached 15 touches by then. At the end of time, the higher-scoring fencer was the winner; a tie resulted in an additional one-minute sudden-death time period. This sudden-death period was further modified by the selection of a draw-winner beforehand; if neither fencer scored a touch during the minute, the predetermined draw-winner won the bout.

== Schedule ==
All times are Central Standard Time (UTC-6).

Date	Time	Round
October 24, 2011	9:00	Qualification pools
October 24, 2011	11:10	Round of 16
October 24, 2011	12:45	Quarterfinals
October 24, 2011	18:50	Semifinals
October 24, 2011	20:10	Final

== Results ==
=== Qualification ===
All 18 fencers were put into three groups of six athletes, were each fencer would have five individual matches. The top 16 athletes overall would qualify for next round.

Rank	Name	Nation	Victories	TG	TR	Dif.	Notes
1	Silvio Fernandez	Venezuela	4	21	6	+15	Q
2	Ringo Quintero	Cuba	4	23	16	+7	Q
3	Paris Inostroza	Chile	4	21	14	+7	Q
4	Soren Thompson	United States	4	24	20	+4	Q
5	Ruben Limardo	Venezuela	4	21	16	+5	Q
6	Weston Kelsey	United States	3	18	13	+5	Q
7	Reynier Henriquez	Cuba	3	22	19	+3	Q
7	Andrés Campos	Colombia	3	22	19	+3	Q
9	Tigran Bajgoric	Canada	3	21	19	+2	Q
10	Jhon Rodriguez	Colombia	3	18	18	0	Q
11	Jose Dominguez	Argentina	3	17	17	0	Q
12	Vincent Pelletier	Canada	2	20	20	0	Q
13	Rolf Nickel	Chile	2	18	23	-5	Q
14	Gerson Ramirez	El Salvador	1	18	23	-5	Q
15	Omar Carrillo	Mexico	1	15	22	-7	Q
16	David Ramirez	El Salvador	1	13	23	-10	Q
16	Gabriel Ochoa	Mexico	1	13	23	-10	
18	Gerber Morales	Guatemala	0	11	25	-14	

=== Elimination round ===
Round of 16
1	Silvio Fernández (VEN)	15
16	David Ramirez (ESA)	11
9	Tigran Bajgoric (CAN)	15
8	Andrés Campos (COL)	11
5	Ruben Limardo (VEN)	15
12	Vincent Pelletier (CAN)	7
13	Rolf Nickel (CHI)	6
4	Soren Thompson (USA)	15
3	Paris Inostroza (CHI)	15
14	Gerson Ramirez (ESA)	3
11	Jose Dominguez (ARG)	8
6	Weston Kelsey (USA)	15
7	Reynier Henriquez (CUB)	14
10	Jhon Rodriguez (COL)	3
15	Omar Carrillo (MEX)	12
2	Ringo Quintero (CUB)	15

Quarterfinals
1	Silvio Fernández (VEN)	15
9	Tigran Bajgoric (CAN)	10
5	Ruben Limardo (VEN)	15
4	Soren Thompson (USA)	11
3	Paris Inostroza (CHI)	8
6	Weston Kelsey (USA)	12
7	Reynier Henriquez (CUB)	15
2	Ringo Quintero (CUB)	9

Semifinals
1	Silvio Fernández (VEN)	2
5	Ruben Limardo (VEN)	4
6	Weston Kelsey (USA)	13
7	Reynier Henriquez (CUB)	10

Final
5	Ruben Limardo (VEN)	10
6	Weston Kelsey (USA)	12
