= Fencing at the 2011 Pan American Games – Women's épée =

Women's épée at the 2011 Pan American Games
- Venue: Multipurpose Gymnasium
- Dates: October 26
- Competitors: 18 from 10 nations

Medalists
Gold medal	Kelly Hurley	United States
Silver medal	Courtney Hurley	United States
Bronze medal	Elida Aguero	Argentina
Bronze medal	Yamirka Rodriguez	Cuba

The women's épée competition of the fencing events at the 2011 Pan American Games in Guadalajara, Mexico, was held on October 26 at the Multipurpose Gymnasium. The defending champion was Courtney Hurley from the United States.

The épée competition consisted of a qualification round followed by a single-elimination bracket with a bronze medal match between the two semifinal losers. Fencing was done to 15 touches or to the completion of three three-minute rounds if neither fencer reached 15 touches by then. At the end of time, the higher-scoring fencer was the winner; a tie resulted in an additional one-minute sudden-death time period. This sudden-death period was further modified by the selection of a draw-winner beforehand; if neither fencer scored a touch during the minute, the predetermined draw-winner won the bout.

== Schedule ==
All times are Central Standard Time (UTC−6).

Date	Time	Round
October 26, 2011	9:00	Qualification pools
October 26, 2011	11:10	Round of 16
October 26, 2011	12:45	Quarterfinals
October 26, 2011	18:50	Semifinals
October 26, 2011	20:10	Final

== Results ==
=== Qualification ===
All 18 fencers were put into three groups of six athletes, were each fencer would have five individual matches. The top 16 athletes overall would qualify for next round.

Rank	Name	Nation	Victories	TG	TR	Dif.	Notes
1	Yamirka Rodriguez	Cuba	5	25	11	+14	Q
2	Kelley Hurley	United States	4	24	9	+15	Q
3	Elida Agüero	Argentina	4	22	17	+5	Q
4	Courtney Hurley	United States	4	20	18	+2	Q
5	Ainsley Switzer	Canada	3	23	16	+7	Q
6	Violeta Peguero	Dominican Republic	3	23	21	+2	Q
7	Andrea Millan	Mexico	3	19	17	+2	Q
8	Eliana Lugo	Venezuela	3	19	18	+1	Q
9	Cáterin Bravo	Chile	3	18	18	0	Q
10	Pía Montecinos	Chile	3	17	20	-3	Q
11	Sherraine Schalm	Canada	2	19	21	-2	Q
12	Zuleydis Ortiz	Cuba	2	19	22	-3	Q
13	Isabel Di Tella	Argentina	2	17	20	-3	Q
14	Maria Martinez	Venezuela	2	18	22	-4	Q
15	Rayssa De Oliveira	Brazil	1	17	21	-4	Q
16	Clarisse De Menezes	Brazil	1	16	24	-8	Q
16	Alexandra Avena	Mexico	0	15	25	-10	
18	Dirley Yepes	Costa Rica	0	12	23	-11	

=== Elimination round ===
Round of 16
1	Yamirka Rodriguez (CUB)	15
16	Clarisse De Menezes (BRA)	10
9	Cáterin Bravo (CHI)	11
8	Eliana Lugo (VEN)	12
5	Ainsley Switzer (CAN)	15
12	Zuleydis Ortiz (CUB)	10
13	Isabel Di Tella (ARG)	10
4	Courtney Hurley (USA)	15
3	Elida Agüero (ARG)	11
14	Maria Martinez (VEN)	10
11	Sherraine Schalm (CAN)	15
6	Violeta Peguero (DOM)	7
7	Andrea Millan (MEX)	15
10	Pía Montecinos (CHI)	8
15	Rayssa De Oliveira (BRA)	12
2	Kelley Hurley (USA)	15

Quarterfinals
1	Yamirka Rodriguez (CUB)	14
8	Eliana Lugo (VEN)	13
5	Ainsley Switzer (CAN)	10
4	Courtney Hurley (USA)	15
3	Elida Agüero (ARG)	15
11	Sherraine Schalm (CAN)	14
7	Andrea Millan (MEX)	12
2	Kelley Hurley (USA)	15

Semifinals
1	Yamirka Rodriguez (CUB)	12
4	Courtney Hurley (USA)	13
3	Elida Agüero (ARG)	4
2	Kelley Hurley (USA)	15

Final
4	Courtney Hurley (USA)	13
2	Kelley Hurley (USA)	15
