= Shooting at the 2011 Pan American Games – Men's 25 metre rapid fire pistol =

Shooting – Men's 25 metre rapid fire pistol at the 2011 Pan American Games
- Venue: Pan American Shooting Polygon
- Dates: October 21–22
- Competitors: 17 from 12 nations

Medalists
Gold medal	Emil Milev	United States
Silver medal	Juan Perez	Cuba
Bronze medal	Franco Di Mauro	Venezuela

The men's 25 metre rapid fire pistol shooting event at the 2011 Pan American Games was held on October 21 and 22 at the Pan American Shooting Polygon in Guadalajara. The defending Pan American Games champion is Leuris Pupo of the Cuba.

The event consisted of two rounds: a qualifier and a final. In the qualifier, each shooter fired 60 shots with a pistol at 25 metres distance. Scores for each shot were in increments of 1, with a maximum score of 10. Targets were presented in series of 5. Each shooter was presented with 12 series, and had a sharply limited time to complete each. Four of the series had to be completed in 8 seconds apiece, four more within 6 seconds, and four within 4 seconds.

The top 6 shooters in the qualifying round moved on to the final round. There, they fired an additional 20 shots. These shots scored in increments of .1, with a maximum score of 10.9. They were presented in four series of 5 shots each, with each series being limited to 4 seconds to make all five shots. The total score from all 80 shots was used to determine final ranking.

== Schedule ==
All times are Central Standard Time (UTC-6).

Date	Time	Round
October 21, 2011	9:00	Qualification Stage 1
October 22, 2011	9:00	Qualification Stage 2
October 22, 2011	14:00	Final

== Records ==
The existing world and Pan American Games records were as follows.

Qualification records
World record	Alexei Klimov (RUS); Christian Reitz (GER)	591	Granada, Spain; Milan, Italy	October 6, 2006; May 28, 2008
Pan American record	Leuris Pupo (CUB)	582	Rio de Janeiro, Brazil	July 18, 2007

Final records
World record	Martin Podhráský (CZE); Christian Reitz (GER)	33	Sydney, Australia; Munich, Germany	March 28, 2011; June 20, 2011
Pan American record	ISSF Rule changed	—	—	—

== Results ==
=== Qualification round ===
Rank	Athlete	Country	8 s	6 s	4 s	8 s	6 s	4 s	Total	Notes
1	Emil Milev	United States	98	94	96	97	96	98	579	Q
2	Emerson Duarte	Brazil	98	95	91	97	97	96	574	Q
3	Franco Di Mauro	Venezuela	98	95	94	96	95	93	571	Q
4	Juan Perez	Cuba	96	96	95	96	94	91	568	Q
5	Julio Molina	El Salvador	93	98	91	96	95	90	563	Q
6	Douglas Gomez	Venezuela	94	97	91	95	92	89	558	Q
7	Sergio Werner Sánchez	Guatemala	93	94	93	97	93	87	557	
8	Daniel Cesar Felizia	Argentina	96	92	92	97	95	84	556	
9	Metodi Igorov	Canada	89	97	85	96	91	96	554	
10	Iosef Forma	Brazil	94	95	86	94	97	87	553	
11	Leuris Pupo	Cuba	99	98	59	98	98	95	547	
12	Ricardo Chandeck	Panama	95	88	83	86	89	87	528	
13	Pedro Garcia-Miro	Peru	93	95	47	95	91	93	514	
14	Jaime Davila	Nicaragua	87	94	83	90	87	67	508	
15	Kevin Vanegas	Panama	83	85	68	81	91	60	468	
	Manuel Figuereo	Dominican Republic							DNS	
	Josue Hernandez	Dominican Republic							DNS	

=== Final ===
Rank	Athlete	Country	1	2	3	4	5	6	7	8	Total	Notes
1st place, gold medalist(s)	Emil Milev	United States	3	1	3	3	5	4	2	3	24	FPR
2nd place, silver medalist(s)	Juan Perez	Cuba	3	3	5	2	5	-	4	1	23	
3rd place, bronze medalist(s)	Franco Di Mauro	Venezuela	5	1	3	2	4	2	2		19	
4	Emerson Duarte	Brazil	2	3	4	3	1	4			17	
5	Julio Molina	El Salvador	1	2	1	3	1				8	
6	Douglas Gomez	Venezuela	1	3	3	0					7	
