= Emilio Torres =

Colombian athlete

Pedro Emilio Torres
Personal information
- Nationality: Colombian
- Born: 29 April 1906 Manta, Cundinamarca, Colombia
- Died: 10 January 1998 (aged 91)

Sport
- Sport: Middle-distance running
- Events: 800 metres, 1500 metres

Pedro Emilio Torres (29 April 1906 – 10 January 1998) was a Colombian middle-distance runner. He competed in the men's 1500 metres at the 1936 Summer Olympics and finished ninth in his heat.
