= Anthony Prymack =

Canadian fencer (born 1990)

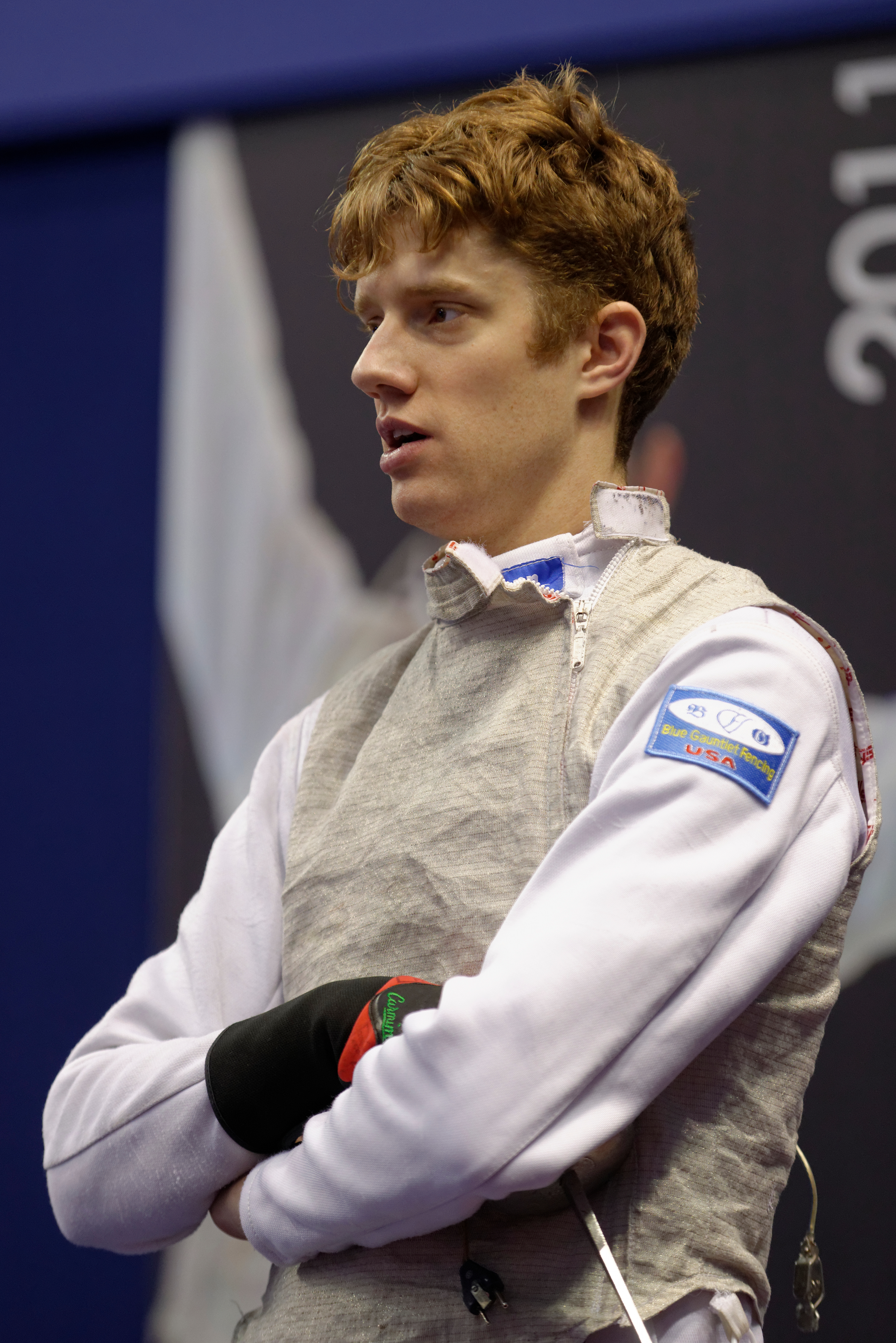
- Prymack at the 2014 Paris World Cup

Personal information
- Born: 24 March 1990 (age 36) Calgary, Alberta
- Height: 1.93 m (6 ft 4 in)
- Weight: 75 kg (165 lb)

Fencing career
- Sport: Fencing
- Country: Canada
- Weapon: foil
- Hand: right-handed
- National coach: Dominique Teissiere
- Club: Olympia Montreal
- Former coach: Leslie Palmai
- FIE ranking: current ranking
Medal record
Men's Foil
Representing Canada
Pan American Games
Silver medal – second place	2011 Guadalajara	Team Foil
Pan American Championships
Silver medal – second place	2014 San José	Team

Anthony Prymack (born 24 March 1990) is a Canadian foil fencer, team silver medallist at the 2011 Pan American Games in Guadalajara and at the 2014 Pan American Fencing Championships in San José. He reached the final table of 64 at the World Fencing Championships in 2009, 2010, 2013, and 2014. He finished the 2013–14 season No.55 in world rankings, a career best. He started fencing at the age of 7 under fencing master Leslie Palmai who was the head coach of Calgary's Epic Fencing Club.
