= Élora Pattaro =

Brazilian fencer (born 1986)

Personal information
- Born: 16 February 1986 (age 40) São Paulo, São Paulo, Brazil

Sport
- Sport: Fencing

Élora Pattaro (born 16 February 1986) is a Brazilian fencer. She competed in the women's individual sabre event at the 2004 Summer Olympics, one year after getting a silver medal at the World Championships Cadets/Juniors, losing only to Olena Khomrova, the best ever result for a Brazilian fencer in the FIE World Championships.
