= Angélica Larios =

Mexican fencer (born 1981)

Personal information
- Full name: Angélica Larios Delgado
- Born: 13 March 1981 (age 45) Mexico City, Mexico
- Height: 1.64 m (5 ft 4 1/2 in)
- Weight: 58 kg (128 lb)

Sport
- Sport: Fencing
- Event: Sabre
Medal record
Women's fencing
Representing Mexico
Pan American Games
Silver medal – second place	2011 Guadalajara	Team sabre

Angélica Larios Delgado (born March 13, 1981) is a Mexican sabre fencer. She won a silver medal, as a member of the Mexican fencing team, in the same weapon at the 2011 Pan American Games in Guadalajara, Mexico.

Larios represented Mexico at the 2008 Summer Olympics in Beijing, where she competed as a lone fencer in the women's individual sabre event. She lost the first preliminary round match to Spain's Araceli Navarro, with a score of 4–15.
