= Úrsula González =

Mexican fencer (born 1991)

Ursula González
Personal information
- Full name: Ursula Sarahí González Zárate
- Nationality: Mexico
- Born: 22 November 1991 (age 34) Ciudad Victoria, Tamaulipas, Mexico
- Height: 1.71 m (5 ft 7 in)
- Weight: 70 kg (154 lb)

Sport
- Sport: Fencing
- Event: Sabre
- Coached by: Igor Chelli (ITA)
Medal record
Women's fencing
Representing Mexico
Pan American Games
Silver medal – second place	2011 Guadalajara	Team sabre

Ursula Sarahí González Zárate (born November 22, 1991) is a Mexican sabre fencer. She won a silver medal, as a member of the host nation's fencing team, in the same weapon at the 2011 Pan American Games in Guadalajara, Mexico.

Gonzalez represented Mexico at the 2012 Summer Olympics in London, where she competed in the women's individual sabre event. Unfortunately, she lost the first preliminary round match to South Korea's Kim Ji-yeon, who eventually won a gold medal in the final, with a final score of 3–15.

She competed in the individual and team sabre events at the 2016 Summer Olympics. She finished in 31st place in the individual event and Mexico finished in 7th in the team event.
