= Alejandra Benítez =

Venezuelan fencer (born 1980)

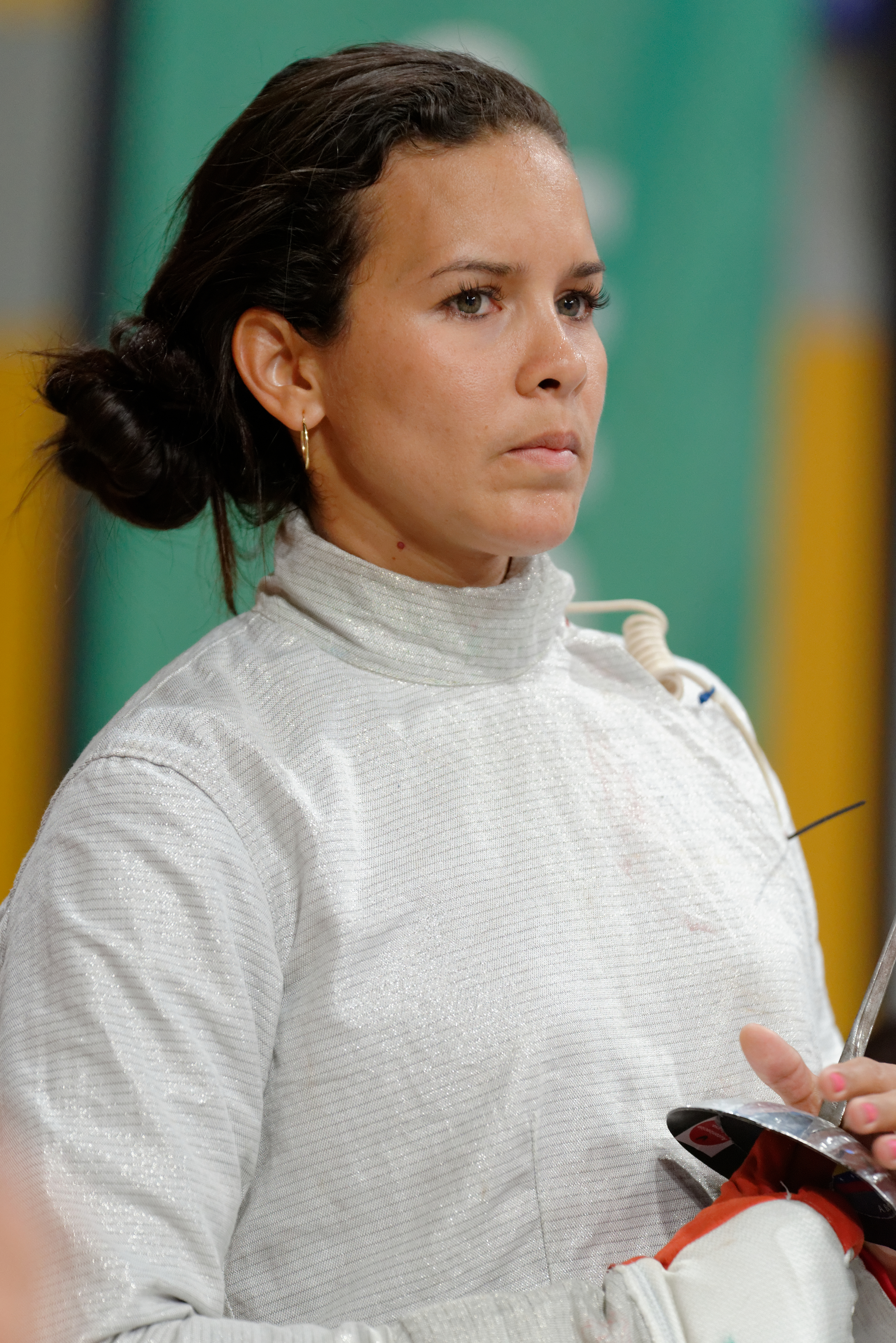

Personal information
- Born: 7 July 1980 (age 46) Caracas, Venezuela
- Height: 1.69 m (5 ft 7 in)
- Weight: 62 kg (137 lb)

Fencing career
- Sport: Fencing
- Weapon: Sabre
- Hand: Right-handed
- FIE ranking: current ranking
Medal record
Women's sabre
Representing Venezuela
Pan American Games
Silver medal – second place	2003 Santo Domingo	Individual
Silver medal – second place	2011 Guadalajara	Individual
Silver medal – second place	2015 Toronto	Individual
Bronze medal – third place	2019 Lima	Individual
Pan American Championships
Bronze medal – third place	2006 Valencia	Individual
Bronze medal – third place	2008 Querétaro	Individual
Bronze medal – third place	2013 Cartagena	Individual

Alejandra Benítez Romero (born 7 July 1980) is a Venezuelan sabre fencer, who competed at the 2004, 2008, 2012 and the 2016 Summer Olympics. She was Minister of Sports in 2013.

== Sports career ==
Benítez was born in a popular parish Antímano, Caracas district. She began fencing accidentally at the age of fifteen years old on the suggestion and good reference of one of her aunts, who knew coach Hildemaro Sánchez at the Central University of Venezuela. The national Venezuelan team trained in the same fencing hall, which inspired her to work hard to join them. Besides fencing, Benítez also practiced ballet, ornamentals jumper, judo, and a little bit of music, swimming and volleyball.

In 1996 the younger Sportler joined the national junior team. With them she took part in the first Junior World Championships for women's sabre held in 1999 in Dijon, France. They earned a gold medal in the team event after Venezuela prevailed successively over Italy, France and Germany.

In the senior category she qualified to the 2004 Summer Olympics in Athens through the zone qualifying tournament for the Americas; she was defeated in the first round by China's Zhang Ying. She won the Havana World Cup in 2005. She earned a bronze medal at the 2006 Pan American Championships in 2006–she would repeat this feat in 2008 and 2013. She qualified to the 2008 Summer Olympics in Beijing as one of the two-ranked American fencers. She received a bye, then lost to Poland's Bogna Jóźwiak. At the 2012 Summer Olympics, her third Olympic participation, she defeated Korea's Lee Ra-jin before losing to World No.2 Sofiya Velikaya.

== Political career ==
Benítez met in 1999 Hugo Chávez, who made a strong impression on her. She supported him in several elections and featured in a TV sport for his presidential campaign. She also stood as honour guard at his funeral. On 22 March 2013 she was named Minister of Sports for the government of newly elected Nicolás Maduro. She was replaced by singer and ex-baseball player Tony Álvarez in the January 2014 government reshuffle.
