= Patricia Contreras =

Mexican-Italian actress and TV host

- Born: Patricia Gloria Contreras
- Occupations: Actress, television host, model

Patricia Gloria Contreras is a Mexican-Italian actress, TV host, and model.

== Career ==
Patricia began modeling in the fashion industry when she was 16, arriving 3rd in the E! Entertainment competition in Mexico city with Fernanda Castillo and Felicidad Aveleira. She started her modeling career in Milano with Woman models where she worked for brands like Vogue Gioello, Armani, Divani e Divani, Cosmopolitan and many other Italian brands.

She gained popularity in TV programs like the Italian series Il Commisario Rex and Non è stato mio figlio with Gabriel Garko. She posed for Italian magazine Maxim as a Rising Star in 2009.

Afterwards she took a break and move to Paris to pursue a career in the art world, she studied for 2 years at the University Parsons in Paris, Ecole du Louvre and ECV for after develop her art series where she exposed in 2014 at the Boscolo hotel. Same year, she was invited to participate in the Italian TV show Chiambretti Supermarket with Piero Chiambretti on Italia 1.

In 2014 she starred in the Italian web series The Lady, created by Lory Del Santo. The series, available only on YouTube, aired for three seasons.

Since then she had collaborated with fashion brands such as Balmain, Louis Vuitton, Loreal, Sephora, Revolve, CamilaCohelo collection, Givenchy beauty, Saint Laurent beauty, Luisa via Roma, Forbes France, Too faced, Tarte cosmetics, Lanolips, Valentino, Renault France, Biondini, Cannes Film Festival, Venice Film Festival, Marrakesh Film Festival.

In 2019, she appeared in March issue of Maxim's Italy edition, in June in Russian Roulette magazine, that same year she won an award for best lifestyle at blogger awards during Cannes film festival, that same year on the cover of Grazia Marroc.

In 2019 she launched her personal beauty brand Flawless Beauty.

In 2021 she posed for Hola Spain next to Ermano Scervino. She was as well invited to be a host talent to the beauty event BeautyCon in Los Angeles hosted by Priyanka Chopra.

== Humanitarian ==
In 2019 she joined a program to raise funds to help to build up schools in Nepal with the association of Valentina Nessi, Vita Association. And she won an award for best lifestyle at blogger awards during Cannes Film Festival.

== Personal life ==
Patricia Gloria has a son named Alexander Pascal of 8 years old.
