= Weston Kelsey =

American épée fencer (born 1981)

Seth Kelsey
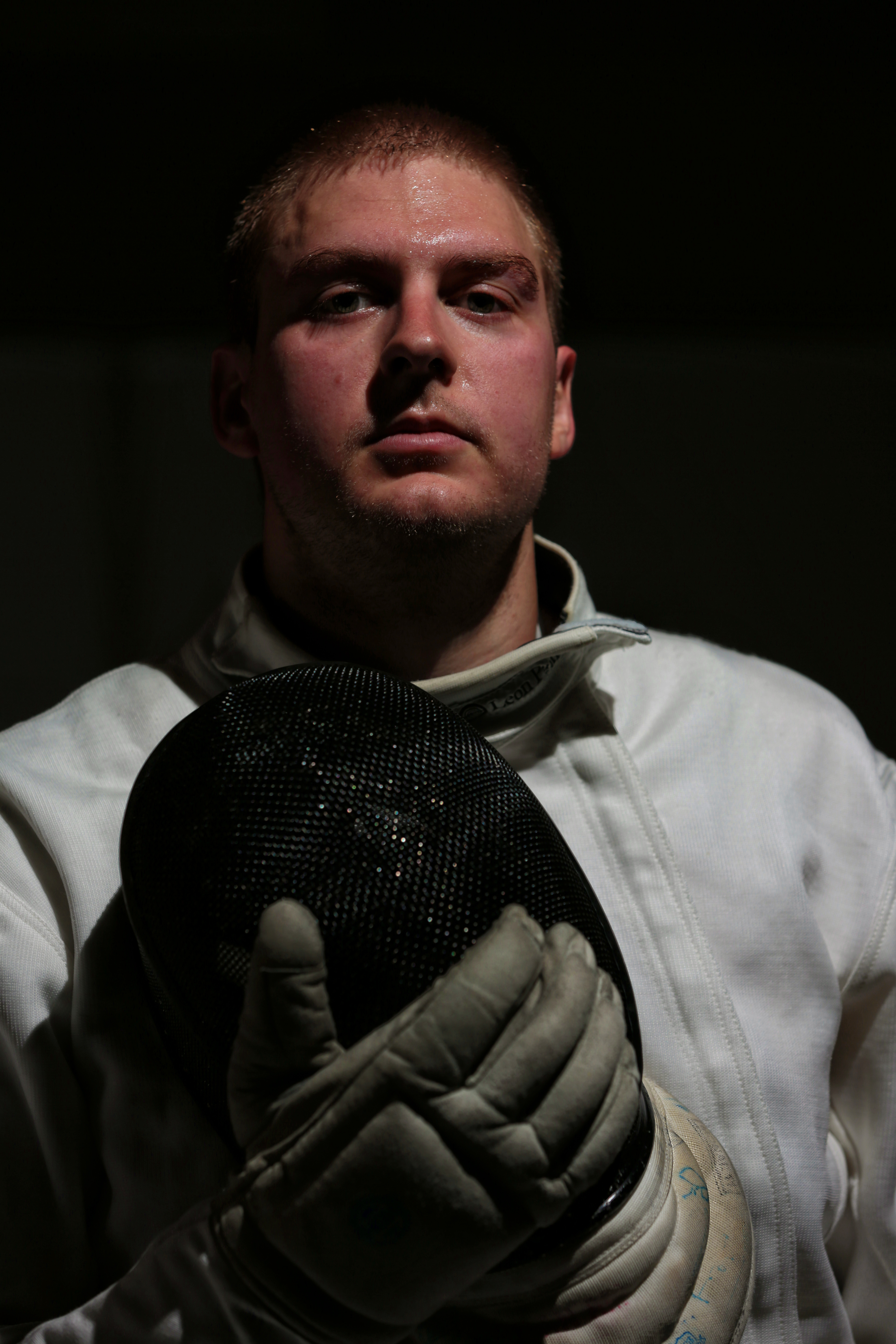

Personal information
- Nickname: Seth
- Born: Weston Kelsey; August 24, 1981 (age 44) Santa Monica, California, United States
- Height: 1.93 m (6 ft 4 in)
- Weight: 95 kg (209 lb)

Sport
- Sport: Fencing
Medal record
Men's fencing
Representing United States
World Championships
Gold medal – first place	2012 Kyiv	Team épée
Silver medal – second place	2010 Paris	Team épée
Pan American Games
Gold medal – first place	2011 Guadalajara	Individual épée
Gold medal – first place	2011 Guadalajara	Team épée
Bronze medal – third place	2007 Rio de Janeiro	Team épée

Weston "Seth" Kelsey (born August 24, 1981) is an American épée fencer and three time Olympic fencer. He competed at three Olympiads: 2004, 2008 and 2012. He finished 4th in the individual competition at the 2012 London Olympics.

== Career ==
He finished 17th in the individual competition at the 2008 Beijing Olympics. He has competed at the World Fencing Championships since 2003. His best results were seventh at the 2010 World Fencing Championships in Paris, France. He was a member of the American team that won the silver medal in team épée at the 2010 World Championships and a member of the American épée team that won the 2012 World Championships in Kyiv, Ukraine. He competed in the 2012 Olympics at London, losing his semi-final 5 - 6 to eventual champion Ruben Limardo. He went on to compete against Korean épée fencer Jung Jin-Sun in the bronze medal match, losing 11 - 12 in the sudden death priority minute.

== See also ==
- List of NCAA fencing champions
- List of USFA Division I National Champions
- List of USFA Hall of Fame members
