= Badminton at the 2011 Pan American Games =

- Venue: Multipurpose Gymnasium, Revolucion Sports Complex
- Dates: October 15 – October 20
- Competitors: 88 from 16 nations

Badminton competitions at the 2011 Pan American Games in Guadalajara was held from October 15 to October 20 at the newly built Multipurpose Gymnasium, Revolucion Sports Complex.

== Schedule ==
October	15	16	17	18	19	20
Men's singles	Rounds of 32/64	Round of 16	Quarterfinals	Semifinals		Bronze final Gold final
Women's singles	Round of 32	Round of 16	Quarterfinals	Semifinals		Bronze final Gold final
Men's doubles	Round of 32	Round of 16	Quarterfinals	Semifinals	Bronze final Gold final	
Women's doubles	Round of 32	Round of 16	Quarterfinals	Semifinals	Bronze final Gold final	
Mixed doubles	Round of 32	Round of 16	Quarterfinals	Semifinals		Bronze final Gold final

== Medal summary ==
=== Medal table ===
Rank	Nation	Gold	Silver	Bronze	Total
1	Canada	3	1	2	6
2	United States	1	3	2	6
3	Guatemala	1	0	0	1
4	Cuba	0	1	0	1
5	Mexico	0	0	2	2
5	Peru	0	0	2	2
7	Brazil	0	0	1	1
7	Jamaica	0	0	1	1
Totals (8 entries)		5	5	10	20

=== Events ===
Event	Gold	Silver	Bronze
Men's singles	Kevin Cordón; Guatemala	Osleni Guerrero; Cuba	Charles Pyne; Jamaica
Men's singles	Kevin Cordón; Guatemala	Osleni Guerrero; Cuba	Daniel Paiola; Brazil
Women's singles	Michelle Li; Canada	Joycelyn Ko; Canada	Victoria Montero; Mexico
Women's singles	Michelle Li; Canada	Joycelyn Ko; Canada	Claudia Rivero; Peru
Men's doubles	United States; Tony Gunawan; Howard Bach	United States; Halim Ho; Sattawat Pongnairat	Mexico; Andrés López; Lino Muñoz
Men's doubles	United States; Tony Gunawan; Howard Bach	United States; Halim Ho; Sattawat Pongnairat	Canada; Adrian Liu; Derrick Ng
Women's doubles	Canada; Alex Bruce; Michelle Li	United States; Rena Wang; Iris Wang	Canada; Grace Gao; Joycelyn Ko
Women's doubles	Canada; Alex Bruce; Michelle Li	United States; Rena Wang; Iris Wang	United States; Eva Lee; Paula Lynn Obañana
Mixed doubles	Canada; Grace Gao; Toby Ng	United States; Halim Ho; Eva Lee	Peru; Claudia Rivero; Rodrigo Pacheco
Mixed doubles	Canada; Grace Gao; Toby Ng	United States; Halim Ho; Eva Lee	United States; Howard Bach; Paula Lynn Obañana

== Qualification ==
There will be 44 participants each in the men's and women's divisions. The number of athletes per country to participate in the competition will be decided by ranking countries based on the total of the point rankings of the highest ranked player or team of men's/women's singles and men's/women's/mixed doubles of each country. The ranking from May 26, 2011 will be used. The host country, Mexico, and the top three ranked nations will receive four men's and women's singles slots. The fourth through seventh ranked nations will receive three men's and women's singles slots, and the eighth through eleventh ranked nations will receive two men's and women's slots. The remaining nations with entries in the badminton competition will be allowed one slot. The slots of one will be awarded to the top ranked nations starting from the twelfth ranked nation and unranked nations drawn by lot.

The total number of slots awarded, including those to the top eleven ranked teams, cannot exceed 44 per division (men's and women's). If the number of athletes confirmed by countries participating in the badminton tournament is under 44 by June 15, 2011, the quota per country will be adjusted so that the limit of slots for each ranked country is four men's and women's slots. Higher-ranked countries will receive priorities in the reallocation of slots.

=== Participating nations ===
The following countries will send athletes:

NOC	Men's Singles	Men's Doubles	Women's Singles	Women's Doubles	Mixed Doubles	Total	
NOC	Men's Singles	Men's Doubles	Women's Singles	Women's Doubles	Mixed Doubles	Quotas	Athletes
Argentina	1		1		1	3	2
Barbados	1		1		1	3	2
Brazil	3	2	3	2	2	12	8
Canada	2	1	2	2	2	9	8
Chile	3	1	2	1	2	9	6
Cuba	2	1	2	1	2	8	4
Dominican Republic	2	1	2	1	2	8	4
Ecuador	1		1		1	3	2
Guatemala	3	1	3	2	1	10	8
Jamaica	2	1	2	1	2	8	4
Mexico	3	2	3	2	3	13	8
Peru	3	1	3	2	2	11	8
Puerto Rico	1		1		1	3	2
Suriname	3	1	3	1	2	10	6
United States	1	2	2	2	2	9	8
Venezuela	3	2	3	2	2	12	8
Total: 16 NOCs	34	16	34	19	27	131	88

== Venue ==
The venue for badminton will be the newly built Multipurpose Gymnasium, in the Revolucion Sports Complex. The venue will seat about 856 people. The venue is also scheduled to host the fencing events at the 2011 Pan American Games.
