= Tennis at the 2011 Pan American Games – Qualification =

Qualification
- Tennis at the 2011 Pan American Games

Events
Singles	men	women
Doubles	men	women	mixed
Qualification
← 2007 ·	Pan American Games	· 2015 →

Countries could enter one team in the doubles tournament and three athletes in the singles tournament. Seeding will be based on ATP and WTA rankings at the time of the draw (October 16).

== Summary ==
Nation	Men	Women	Total
Argentina	3	3	6
Bahamas	1		1
Barbados	2		2
Bolivia	2	1	3
Brazil	3	3	6
Canada	2	1	3
Chile	3	3	3
Colombia	3	3	6
Cuba	1	1	2
Dominican Republic	2		2
Ecuador	3	1	4
El Salvador	2		2
Guatemala	2		2
Haiti	1		1
Mexico	3	3	6
Paraguay	2	2	4
Peru	3	3	6
Puerto Rico	1	2	3
United States	3	2	5
Uruguay	3		3
Venezuela	3	3	6
Total athletes	48	31	80
Total NOCs	20	14	21 NOCs

== Qualifiers ==
- Players entered in the singles events will contest the doubles events as well.
- Rankings as of August 29, 2011.

=== Men's singles ===
No.	Rank	Player	NOC
World Ranking
1	90	João Souza	Brazil
–	100	Paul Capdeville	Chile
2	112	Horacio Zeballos	Argentina
3	113	Ricardo Mello	Brazil
4	114	Rogério Dutra da Silva	Brazil
–	184	Carlos Salamanca	Colombia
5	208	Eduardo Schwank	Argentina
6	214	Víctor Estrella	Dominican Republic
7	220	Facundo Argüello	Argentina
8	229	Juan Sebastián Cabal	Colombia
9	237	Jorge Aguilar	Chile
10	256	Nicholas Monroe	United States
11	277	Robert Farah	Colombia
12	278	Greg Ouellette	United States
13	292	Pierre-Ludovic Duclos	Canada
14	329	Denis Kudla	United States
15	340	Júlio César Campozano	Ecuador
16	374	Christopher Díaz Figueroa	Guatemala
17	414	Duilio Beretta	Peru
18	433	Nicolás Massú	Chile
19	442	Iván Endara	Ecuador
20	451	Mauricio Echazú	Peru
21	524	Olivier Sajous	Haiti
22	540	Román Recarte Alonso	Venezuela
23	603	Martín Cuevas	Uruguay
24	659	Iván Miranda	Peru
25	665	Daniel-Alejandro Lopez	Paraguay
26	671	Diego Galeano	Paraguay
27	671	Federico Zeballos	Bolivia
28	746	Marcelo Arévalo	El Salvador
29	757	Luis David Martinez	Venezuela
30	787	Chris Klingemann	Canada
31	794	Piero Luisi	Venezuela
32	840	Roberto Quiroz	Ecuador
33	924	Mauricio Doria-Medina	Bolivia
34	931	Ariel Behar	Uruguay
35	971	Darian King	Barbados
36	1001	Haydn Lewis	Barbados
37	1035	Federico Sansonetti	Uruguay
Wildcards
–	1274	Hugo Dellien	Bolivia
38	1344	Rafael Arévalo	El Salvador
39	1614	Sebastien Vidal	Guatemala
40	1825	Marvin Rolle	Bahamas
41	N/R	José Hernández	Dominican Republic
42	N/R	Alex Llompart	Puerto Rico
Host nation
43	339	Daniel Garza	Mexico
44	503	César Ramírez	Mexico
45	512	Santiago González	Mexico
Additional
46	271	Guillermo Rivera Aránguiz	Chile
47	310	Alejandro González	Colombia
48	N/R	Willian Sanchez	Cuba

=== Women's singles ===
No.	Rank	Player	NOC
World Ranking
1	66	Christina McHale	United States
2	79	Irina Falconi	United States
–	97	Stéphanie Dubois	Canada
–	110	Sloane Stephens	United States
3	176	Florencia Molinero	Argentina
4	235	Ana Clara Duarte	Brazil
5	241	Verónica Cepede Royg	Paraguay
6	248	Catalina Castaño	Colombia
7	259	María Fernanda Álvarez Terán	Bolivia
8	263	Mariana Duque	Colombia
9	290	Vivian Segnini	Brazil
10	297	Monica Puig	Puerto Rico
11	299	María Irigoyen	Argentina
12	308	Teliana Pereira	Brazil
13	312	Andrea Koch Benvenuto	Chile
14	353	Adriana Pérez	Venezuela
15	355	Andrea Gámiz	Venezuela
16	383	Mailen Auroux	Argentina
17	429	Gabriela Dabrowski	Canada
18	430	Karen Castiblanco	Colombia
19	447	Bianca Botto	Peru
20	472	Camila Silva	Chile
21	526	Isabella Robbiani	Paraguay
22	532	Daniela Seguel	Chile
23	592	Marina Giral Lores	Venezuela
Wildcards
24	634	Patricia Kú Flores	Peru
25	749	Jessica Roland-Rosario	Puerto Rico
26	870	Misleydis Díaz González	Cuba
27	N/R	Doménica González	Ecuador
Host nation
28	501	Ximena Hermoso	Mexico
29	955	Ana Paula de la Peña	Mexico
30	N/R	Valeria Pulido	Mexico
Additional
31	1122	Ximena Siles Luna	Peru
32	N/R	Yamile Fors Guerra	Cuba
