= Gymnastics at the 2011 Pan American Games – Qualification =

== Qualification summary ==
| Nation | Artistic (Note: Artistic Gymnastics, NOCs with 6 entered athletes may also enter the team competition.) | | Rhythmic | | Trampoline | | Total |
| Nation | Men | Women | Individual | Group | Men | Women | Total |
|---|---|---|---|---|---|---|---|
| Argentina | 6 | 2 | 2 | | | | 10 |
| Bolivia | | 1 | | | | | 1 |
| Brazil | 6 | 6 | 2 | 6 | 2 | 2 | 24 |
| Canada | 6 | 6 | 2 | 6 | 2 | 2 | 24 |
| Chile | 2 | 2 | 1 | | | | 5 |
| Colombia | 6 | 6 | 1 | | | | 13 |
| Costa Rica | 1 | 1 | | | | | 2 |
| Cuba | 2 | 6 | 2 | 6 | 1 | | 17 |
| Dominican Republic | 1 | 1 | | | | | 2 |
| Ecuador | 2 | 2 | | | | | 4 |
| El Salvador | 1 | | | | | | 1 |
| Guatemala | 1 | 1 | 1 | | | | 3 |
| Mexico | 6 | 6 | 1 | | 1 | 1 | 15 |
| Peru | 2 | 1 | | | | | 3 |
| Puerto Rico | 6 | 2 | | | | 1 | 9 |
| Trinidad and Tobago | 1 | 1 | | | | | 2 |
| United States | 6 | 6 | 2 | 6 | 2 | 2 | 24 |
| Uruguay | | 1 | | | | | 1 |
| Venezuela | 2 | 6 | 2 | 6 | | | 16 |
| Total: 19 NOCs | 57 | 57 | 16 | 30 | 8 | 8 | 176 |

== Artistic Gymnastics ==
Qualification for the artistic gymnastics competition will be done in teams, and is summarized below. The qualifying competition was the 2010 Pan American Championship in Guadalajara. Each nation can send a maximum of 12 athletes (6 male and 6 female).

=== Men ===
| Event | Criterion | Qualified | Athletes per NOC |
|---|---|---|---|
| 2010 Pan American Championship | Teams places 1-7 | United States; Brazil; Canada; Colombia; Puerto Rico; Mexico; Argentina | 6 |
| 2010 Pan American Championship | Teams places 8-12 | Venezuela; Cuba; Chile; Ecuador; Peru | 2 |
| 2010 Pan American Championship | Individual all around 5 countries not already qualified. | Dominican Republic; El Salvador; Trinidad and Tobago; Guatemala; Costa Rica | 1 |
| TOTAL | | | 57 |

=== Women ===
| Event | Criterion | Qualified | Athletes per NOC |
|---|---|---|---|
| 2010 Pan American Championship | Teams places 1-7 | United States; Canada; Brazil; Mexico; Venezuela; Colombia; Cuba** | 6 |
| 2010 Pan American Championship | Teams places 8-11* | Argentina; Ecuador; Puerto Rico; Chile | 2 |
| 2010 Pan American Championship | Individual all around 7 countries not already qualified.* | Guatemala; Peru; Costa Rica; Trinidad and Tobago; Dominican Republic; Uruguay; ~~Panama~~**; Bolivia** | 1 |
| TOTAL | | | 55 |

- There were only 11 teams that competed at the Pan American Championship, so the remaining two spots go into the individual qualification.
  - Cuba decided to send only four out of six athletes qualified. Panama also withdrew its athlete. Bolivia was given a wildcard to enter the competition.

== Rhythmic Gymnastics ==
Qualification for the rhythmic gymnastics competition will be done in teams, and is summarized below. The qualifying competition was the 2010 Pan American Championship in Guadalajara. Each nation can send a maximum of 8 athletes.

=== Individual ===
| Event | Vacancies | Qualified |
|---|---|---|
| 2010 Pan American Championship | 10 (2 each) | Canada; Brazil; Venezuela; Cuba; United States; Argentina |
| 2010 Pan American Championship | 5 (1 each) | Mexico**; Guatemala; Colombia; Chile |
| TOTAL | 15 | |

* The top 6 countries in the group competition (see below) will qualify 2 athletes each. The remaining 4 places are given to countries not already qualified with a maximum of one gymnast per country.
** Mexico qualified two spots, but was stripped when one athlete tested positive for drug usage. Argentina the next best placed country was upgraded to send two athletes.

=== Group ===
Each country qualifying a group can enter 6 athletes each.

| Event | Criterion | Qualified |
|---|---|---|
| 2010 Pan American Championship | Top 5 | Canada; Brazil; Venezuela; Cuba; United States |
| TOTAL | 5 | |

== Trampoline ==
There is a quota of 16 athletes (8 male and 8 female). The top three overall teams at the 2010 Pan American Championship will qualify 2 athletes each while, places four and five will qualify one athlete each.

=== Men ===
| Event | Criterion | Qualified | Athletes per NOC |
|---|---|---|---|
| 2010 Pan American Championship | Teams places 1-3 | Canada; Brazil; United States | 2 |
| 2010 Pan American Championship | Teams places 4-5 | Mexico; Cuba | 1 |
| TOTAL | | | 8 |

=== Women ===
| Event | Criterion | Qualified | Athletes per NOC |
|---|---|---|---|
| 2010 Pan American Championship | Teams places 1-3 | Canada; Brazil; United States | 2 |
| 2010 Pan American Championship | Teams places 4-5 | Mexico; Puerto Rico | 1 |
| TOTAL | | | 8 |
