= Table tennis at the 2011 Pan American Games – Qualification =

== Qualification summary ==
NOC	Men		Women		Total
NOC	Individual	Team	Individual	Team	Total
Argentina	3	X			3
Brazil	3	X	3	X	6
Canada	3	X	3	X	6
Chile	3	X	3	X	6
Colombia	1		3	X	4
Cuba	3	X	3	X	6
Dominican Republic	3	X	3	X	6
Ecuador	3	X			3
El Salvador	3	X	3	X	6
Guatemala	3	X	3	X	6
Mexico	3	X	3	X	6
Paraguay	1				1
Peru	1		3	X	4
Puerto Rico			3		3
Trinidad and Tobago	1		1		2
United States	3	X	3	X	6
Venezuela	3	X	3	X	6
Total: 17 NOCs	40	12	40	12	80

== Men's ==
=== Men's individual ===
Competition	Location	Athletes per NOC	Qualified
Host Nation	-	3	Mexico
Top 3 Americas teams in the ITTF Team Ranking		3	Brazil; Argentina; Canada
South America Qualification tournament	(Mexico) Guadalajara	3	Venezuela; Ecuador
Central American Qualification tournament	(Mexico) Guadalajara	3	Guatemala; El Salvador
Caribbean Qualification tournament	(Mexico) Guadalajara	3	Dominican Republic; Cuba
Special Qualification tournament	(Mexico) Guadalajara	3	United States; Chile
Special Qualification tournament*	(Mexico) Guadalajara	1	(Paraguay) Marcelo Aguirre (Colombia) Alexander Echavarria (Peru) Juan Acosta (Trinidad and Tobago) Dexter St. Louis
TOTAL		40	

*Open to countries not already qualified.

=== Men's team ===
Event	Date	Location	Vacancies	Qualified
Host Nation	-	-	1	Mexico
Top 3 Americas teams in the ITTF Team Ranking	January 5, 2011		3	Brazil; Argentina; Canada
South America Qualification tournament	May, 2011	(Mexico) Guadalajara	2	Venezuela; Ecuador
Central American Qualification tournament	May, 2011	(Mexico) Guadalajara	2	Guatemala; El Salvador
Caribbean Qualification tournament	May, 2011	(Mexico) Guadalajara	2	Dominican Republic; Cuba
Special Qualification tournament	May, 2011*	(Mexico) Guadalajara	2	United States; Chile
TOTAL			12	

* Was staged right after the above regional qualification tournaments, in which 2 teams from any region can qualify.

== Women's ==
=== Women's individual ===
Competition	Location	Athletes per NOC	Qualified
Host Nation	-	3	Mexico
Top 3 Americas teams in the ITTF Team Ranking		3	United States; Brazil; Canada
South America Qualification tournament	(Mexico) Guadalajara	3	Chile; Venezuela
Central American Qualification tournament	(Mexico) Guadalajara	3	El Salvador; Guatemala
Caribbean Qualification tournament	(Mexico) Guadalajara	3	Dominican Republic; Cuba
Special Qualification tournament	(Mexico) Guadalajara	3	Colombia; Peru
Special Qualification tournament*	(Mexico) Guadalajara	1	(Puerto Rico) Carelyn Cordero (Puerto Rico) Jerica Marrero (Puerto Rico) Daniely Ríos (Trinidad and Tobago) Rheann Chung
TOTAL		40	

*Open to countries not already qualified.

- Puerto Rico qualified 3 athletes however, they will not be allowed to enter a women's team.

=== Women's team ===
Event	Date	Location	Vacancies	Qualified
Host Nation	-	-	1	Mexico
Top 3 Americas teams in the ITTF Team Ranking	January 5, 2011		3	United States; Brazil; Canada
South America Qualification tournament	May, 2011	(Mexico) Guadalajara	2	Chile; Venezuela
Central American Qualification tournament	May, 2011	(Mexico) Guadalajara	2	El Salvador; Guatemala
Caribbean Qualification tournament	May, 2011	(Mexico) Guadalajara	2	Dominican Republic; Cuba
Special Qualification tournament	May, 2011*	(Mexico) Guadalajara	2	Colombia; Peru
TOTAL			12	

* Was staged right after the above regional qualification tournaments, in which 2 teams from any region can qualify.
