= Tennis at the 2011 Pan American Games – Men's doubles =

Tennis – Men's doubles at the 2011 Pan American Games
- Venue: Telcel Tennis Complex
- Dates: October 18 - October 22
- Competitors: 32 from 16 nations

Medalists
| Gold medal | Juan Sebastián Cabal; Robert Farah | Colombia |
| Silver medal | Julio César Campozano; Roberto Quiroz | Ecuador |
| Bronze medal | Nicholas Monroe; Greg Ouellette | United States |

Men's doubles
- Tennis at the 2011 Pan American Games

Events
| Singles | men | women |
| Doubles | men | women | mixed |
Qualification
| ← 2007 · | Pan American Games | · 2015 → |

The men's doubles tennis event of the 2011 Pan American Games was held from October 18–22 at the Telcel Tennis Complex in Guadalajara. The defending Pan American Games champion is Eduardo Schwank and Horacio Zeballos of Argentina.

== Seeds ==
1. Juan Sebastián Cabal / (Colombia) Robert Farah (COL) (champions, gold medalists)
2. Eduardo Schwank / (Argentina) Horacio Zeballos (ARG) (first round)
3. Daniel Garza / (Mexico) Santiago González (MEX) (first round)
4. Nicholas Monroe / (United States) Greg Ouellette (USA) (semifinals, bronze medalists)

== Draw ==
=== Key ===
- Q = Qualifier
- WC = Wild card
- LL = Lucky loser
- Alt = Alternate
- ITF = ITF entry
- PR = Protected ranking
- SR = Special ranking
- SE = Special exempt
- JE = Junior exempt
- JR = Junior Accelerator Programme entrant
- CO = College Accelerator Programme entrant
- NG = Next Gen Accelerator Program entrant
- w/o = Walkover
- r = Retired
- d = Defaulted

=== Finals ===
Semifinals
1 | Juan Sebastián Cabal (Colombia) Robert Farah (COL) | 7^{7} | 7^{9}
4 | Nicholas Monroe (United States) Greg Ouellette (USA) | 6^{4} | 6^{7}
Darian King (Barbados) Haydn Lewis (BAR) | 3 | 6 | [10]
Julio César Campozano (Ecuador) Roberto Quiroz (ECU) | 6 | 1 | [12]

Final
1 | Juan Sebastián Cabal (Colombia) Robert Farah (COL) | 6 | 6
Julio César Campozano (Ecuador) Roberto Quiroz (ECU) | 0 | 4
Bronze medal match
4 | Nicholas Monroe (United States) Greg Ouellette (USA) | 6^{9} | 6 | [10]
Darian King (Barbados) Haydn Lewis (BAR) | 7^{11} | 2 | [7]

=== Top half ===
First round
1 | JS Cabal (Colombia) R Farah (COL) | 7^{7} | 6
R Mello (Brazil) J Souza (BRA) | 6^{5} | 3
C Díaz Figueroa (Guatemala) S Vidal (GUA) | 3 | 6 | [6]
M Cuevas (Uruguay) F Sansonetti (URU) | 6 | 4 | [10]
4 | N Monroe (United States) G Ouellette (USA) | 6 | 6
M Echazú (Peru) I Miranda (PER) | 3 | 4
V Estrella (Dominican Republic) J Hernández (DOM) | 3 | 7^{7} | [6]
M Arévalo (El Salvador) R Arévalo (ESA) | 6 | 6^{2} | [10]

Quarterfinals
1 | JS Cabal (Colombia) R Farah (COL) | 6 | 6
M Cuevas (Uruguay) F Sansonetti (URU) | 1 | 3
4 | N Monroe (United States) G Ouellette (USA) | w/o
M Arévalo (El Salvador) R Arévalo (ESA)

Semifinals
1 | JS Cabal (Colombia) R Farah (COL) | 7^{7} | 7^{9}
4 | N Monroe (United States) G Ouellette (USA) | 6^{4} | 6^{7}

=== Bottom half ===
First round
M Doria-Medina (Bolivia) F Zeballos (BOL) | 1 | 5
J Aguilar (Chile) N Massú (CHI) | 6 | 7
D King (Barbados) H Lewis (BAR) | 7 | 6^{4} | [10]
3 | D Garza (Mexico) S González (MEX) | 5 | 7^{7} | [5]
JC Campozano (Ecuador) R Quiroz (ECU) | 6 | 7
P Luisi (Venezuela) L Martínez (VEN) | 3 | 5
J Benítez (Paraguay) DA López (PAR) | 6 | 2 | [10]
2 | E Schwank (Argentina) H Zeballos (ARG) | 4 | 6 | [8]

Quarterfinals
J Aguilar (Chile) N Massú (CHI) | 6 | 6^{6} | [8]
D King (Barbados) H Lewis (BAR) | 4 | 7^{8} | [10]
JC Campozano (Ecuador) R Quiroz (ECU) | 6 | 6
J Benítez (Paraguay) DA López (PAR) | 4 | 1

Semifinals
D King (Barbados) H Lewis (BAR) | 3 | 6 | [10]
JC Campozano (Ecuador) R Quiroz (ECU) | 6 | 1 | [12]
