= Tennis at the 2011 Pan American Games – Mixed doubles =

Tennis – Mixed doubles at the 2011 Pan American Games
- Venue: Telcel Tennis Complex
- Dates: October 17 – October 21
- Competitors: 24 from 12 nations

Medalists
| Gold medal | Ana Paula de la Peña; Santiago González | Mexico |
| Silver medal | Andrea Koch Benvenuto; Guillermo Rivera Aránguiz | Chile |
| Bronze medal | Ana Clara Duarte; Rogério Dutra Silva | Brazil |

Mixed doubles
- Tennis at the 2011 Pan American Games

Events
| Singles | men | women |
| Doubles | men | women | mixed |
Qualification
| ← 1995 · | Pan American Games | · 2015 → |

The mixed doubles tennis event of the 2011 Pan American Games was held from October 17–21 at the Telcel Tennis Complex in Guadalajara. The defending Pan American Games champion from 1995 is Shaun Stafford and Jack Waite of the United States.

The mixed doubles event is being held for the first time since the 1995 Pan American Games in Mar del Plata, because the event was added to the tennis program of the 2012 Summer Olympics in London.

== Seeds ==
1. Ana Clara Duarte / (Brazil) Rogério Dutra Silva (BRA) (semifinals, bronze medalists)
2. Andrea Koch Benvenuto / (Chile) Guillermo Rivera Aránguiz (CHI) (final, silver medalists)
3. Verónica Cepede Royg / (Paraguay) Diego Galeano (PAR) (quarterfinals)
4. Adriana Pérez / (Venezuela) Román Recarte (VEN) (semifinals, fourth place)

== Draw ==
=== Key ===
- Q = Qualifier
- WC = Wild card
- LL = Lucky loser
- Alt = Alternate
- ITF = ITF entry
- PR = Protected ranking
- SR = Special ranking
- SE = Special exempt
- JE = Junior exempt
- JR = Junior Accelerator Programme entrant
- CO = College Accelerator Programme entrant
- NG = Next Gen Accelerator Program entrant
- w/o = Walkover
- r = Retired
- d = Defaulted

=== Finals ===
Semifinals
1 | Ana Clara Duarte (Brazil) Rogério Dutra Silva (BRA) | 5 | 3
Ana Paula de la Peña (Mexico) Santiago González (MEX) | 7 | 6
4 | Adriana Pérez (Venezuela) Román Recarte (VEN) | 4 | 6 | [8]
2 | Andrea Koch Benvenuto (Chile) Guillermo Rivera Aránguiz (CHI) | 6 | 3 | [10]

Final
Ana Paula de la Peña (Mexico) Santiago González (MEX) | 7 | 6
2 | Andrea Koch Benvenuto (Chile) Guillermo Rivera Aránguiz (CHI) | 5 | 4
Bronze medal match
1 | Ana Clara Duarte (Brazil) Rogério Dutra Silva (BRA) | 7^{7} | 5 | [11]
4 | Adriana Pérez (Venezuela) Román Recarte (VEN) | 6^{4} | 7 | [9]

=== Top half ===
First round
M Puig (Puerto Rico) A Llompart (PUR) | 5 | 7 | [7]
B Botto (Peru) D Beretta (PER) | 7 | 5 | [10]
D González (Ecuador) I Endara (ECU) | 4 | 3
AP de la Peña (Mexico) S González (MEX) | 6 | 6

Quarterfinals
1 | AC Duarte (Brazil) R Dutra Silva (BRA) | 6 | 6
B Botto (Peru) D Beretta (PER) | 3 | 4
3 | V Cepede Royg (Paraguay) D Galeano (PAR) | 5 | 0
AP de la Peña (Mexico) S González (MEX) | 7 | 6

Semifinals
1 | AC Duarte (Brazil) R Dutra Silva (BRA) | 5 | 3
AP de la Peña (Mexico) S González (MEX) | 7 | 6

=== Bottom half ===
First round
G Dabrowski (Canada) C Klingemann (CAN) | 6^{2} | 3
M Auroux (Argentina) F Argüello (ARG) | 7^{7} | 6
Y Fors (Cuba) W Dorante (CUB) | 1 | 4
K Castiblanco (Colombia) A González (COL) | 6 | 6

Quarterfinals
M Auroux (Argentina) F Argüello (ARG) | 6 | 1 | [8]
4 | A Pérez (Venezuela) R Recarte (VEN) | 4 | 6 | [10]
K Castiblanco (Colombia) A González (COL) | 4 | 6 | [7]
2 | A Koch Benvenuto (Chile) G Rivera Aránguiz (CHI) | 6 | 4 | [10]

Semifinals
4 | A Pérez (Venezuela) R Recarte (VEN) | 4 | 6 | [8]
2 | A Koch Benvenuto (Chile) G Rivera Aránguiz (CHI) | 6 | 3 | [10]
