= Tennis at the 2011 Pan American Games – Women's doubles =

Tennis – Women's doubles at the 2011 Pan American Games
- Venue: Telcel Tennis Complex
- Dates: October 18–21
- Competitors: 18 from 9 nations

Medalists
Gold medal	María Irigoyen; Florencia Molinero	Argentina
Silver medal	Irina Falconi; Christina McHale	United States
Bronze medal	Catalina Castaño; Mariana Duque Mariño	Colombia

Women's doubles
- Tennis at the 2011 Pan American Games

Events
Singles	men	women
Doubles	men	women	mixed
Qualification
← 2007 ·	Pan American Games	· 2015 →

The women's doubles tennis event of the 2011 Pan American Games was held on October 18–21 at the Telcel Tennis Complex in Guadalajara. The defending Pan American Games champions were Jorgelina Cravero and Betina Jozami of Argentina.

== Seeds ==
1. María Irigoyen / (Argentina) Florencia Molinero (ARG) (champions, gold medalists)
2. Irina Falconi / (United States) Christina McHale (USA) (final, silver medalists)
3. Catalina Castaño / (Colombia) Mariana Duque Mariño (COL) (semifinals, bronze medalists)
4. Teliana Pereira / (Brazil) Vivian Segnini (BRA) (semifinals, fourth place)

== Draw ==
=== Key ===
- Q = Qualifier
- WC = Wild card
- LL = Lucky loser
- Alt = Alternate
- ITF = ITF entry
- PR = Protected ranking
- SR = Special ranking
- SE = Special exempt
- JE = Junior exempt
- JR = Junior Accelerator Programme entrant
- CO = College Accelerator Programme entrant
- NG = Next Gen Accelerator Program entrant
- w/o = Walkover
- r = Retired
- d = Defaulted

=== Finals ===
Semifinals
1	María Irigoyen (Argentina) Florencia Molinero (ARG)	3	6	[12]
3	Catalina Castaño (Colombia) Mariana Duque Mariño (COL)	6	1	[10]
4	Teliana Pereira (Brazil) Vivian Segnini (BRA)	2	6	[6]
2	Irina Falconi (United States) Christina McHale (USA)	6	2	[10]

Final
1	María Irigoyen (Argentina) Florencia Molinero (ARG)	6	2	[10]
2	Irina Falconi (United States) Christina McHale (USA)	4	6	[6]
Bronze medal match
3	Catalina Castaño (Colombia) Mariana Duque Mariño (COL)	6^{2}	6	[10]
4	Teliana Pereira (Brazil) Vivian Segnini (BRA)	7^{7}	4	[6]

=== Top half ===
First round	Quarterfinals				Semifinals
	1	M Irigoyen (Argentina) F Molinero (ARG)	7	6
		MF Álvarez (Bolivia) N Zeballos (BOL)	5	4
					1	M Irigoyen (Argentina) F Molinero (ARG)	3	6	[12]
					3	C Castaño (Colombia) M Duque (COL)	6	1	[10]
	3	C Castaño (Colombia) M. Duque (COL)	6	6
		X Hermoso (Mexico) V Pulido (MEX)	4	4

=== Bottom half ===
First round
D Seguel (Chile) C Silva (CHI)	7^{7}	3	[11]
M Díaz (Cuba) Y Fors (CUB)	6^{3}	6	[9]

Quarterfinals
D Seguel (Chile) C Silva (CHI)	1	4
4	T Pereira (Brazil) V Segnini (BRA)	6	6
P Kú Flores (Peru) X Siles-Luna (PER)	0	0
2	I Falconi (United States) C McHale (USA)	6	6

Semifinals
4	T Pereira (Brazil) V Segnini (BRA)	2	6	[6]
2	I Falconi (United States) C McHale (USA)	6	2	[10]
