= Tennis at the 2011 Pan American Games – Women's singles =

Tennis – Women's singles at the 2011 Pan American Games
- Venue: Telcel Tennis Complex
- Dates: October 17–21
- Competitors: 29 competitors from 14 nations

Medalists
Gold medal	Irina Falconi	United States
Silver medal	Monica Puig	Puerto Rico
Bronze medal	Christina McHale	United States

Women's singles
- Tennis at the 2011 Pan American Games

Events
Singles	men	women
Doubles	men	women	mixed
Qualification
← 2007 ·	Pan American Games	· 2015 →

The women's singles tennis event of the 2011 Pan American Games was held on October 17–21 at the Telcel Tennis Complex in Guadalajara. The reigning Pan American Games champion, Milagros Sequera of Venezuela, did not defend her title.

== Seeds ==
1. Christina McHale (USA) (semifinals, bronze medalist)
2. Irina Falconi (USA) (champion, gold medalist)
3. Mariana Duque Mariño (COL) (quarterfinals)
4. Florencia Molinero (ARG) (semifinals, fourth place)
5. Verónica Cepede Royg (PAR) (quarterfinals)
6. María Fernanda Álvarez Terán (BOL) (second round)
7. Monica Puig (PUR) (final, silver medalist)
8. Catalina Castaño (COL) (second round)

== Draw ==
=== Key ===
- Q = Qualifier
- WC = Wild card
- LL = Lucky loser
- Alt = Alternate
- ITF = ITF entry
- PR = Protected ranking
- SR = Special ranking
- SE = Special exempt
- JE = Junior exempt
- JR = Junior Accelerator Programme entrant
- CO = College Accelerator Programme entrant
- NG = Next Gen Accelerator Program entrant
- w/o = Walkover
- r = Retired
- d = Defaulted

=== Finals ===
Semifinals
1	Christina McHale (USA)	6^{2}	4
7	Monica Puig (PUR)	7^{7}	6
4	Florencia Molinero (ARG)	3	4
2	Irina Falconi (USA)	6	6

Final
7	Monica Puig (PUR)	3	2
2	Irina Falconi (USA)	6	6
Bronze medal match
1	Christina McHale (USA)	6	6
4	Florencia Molinero (ARG)	1	1

=== Top half ===
First round
A Koch Benvenuto (CHI)	6	6
WC	P Kú Flores (PER)	1	0
X Hermoso (MEX)	6	6
V Segnini (BRA)	4	2
M Irigoyen (ARG)	2	6	2
5	V Cepede Royg (PAR)	6	3	6
3	M Duque (COL)	6	6
N Zeballos (BOL)	3	2
X Siles-Luna (PER)	2	6	6^{1}
D Seguel (CHI)	6	4	7^{7}
A Pérez (VEN)	6	5	6
M Auroux (ARG)	3	7	0
AC Duarte (BRA)	1	4
7	M Puig (PUR)	6	6

Second round
1	C McHale (USA)	6	6
A Koch Benvenuto (CHI)	4	2
X Hermoso (MEX)	3	6^{6}
5	V Cepede Royg (PAR)	6	7^{8}
3	M Duque (COL)	7	6
D Seguel (CHI)	5	0
A Pérez (VEN)	0	5
7	M Puig (PUR)	6	7

Quarterfinals
1	C McHale (USA)	7	6
5	V Cepede Royg (PAR)	5	3
3	M Duque (COL)	2	3
7	M Puig (PUR)	6	6

Semifinals
1	C McHale (USA)	6^{2}	4
7	M Puig (PUR)	7^{7}	6

=== Bottom half ===
First round
6	MF Álvarez Terán (BOL)	6	7
V Pulido (MEX)	4	5
WC	J Roland (PUR)	6	7
WC	D González (ECU)	2	5
K Castiblanco (COL)	6	5	4
I Robbiani (PAR)	2	7	6
WC	M Díaz (CUB)	1	6^{2}
4	F Molinero (ARG)	6	7^{7}
8	C Castaño (COL)	6	4	6
AP de la Peña (MEX)	4	6	2
B Botto (PER)	6	6
T Pereira (BRA)	1	2
G Dabrowski (CAN)	6	6
C Silva (CHI)	4	0
A Gámiz (VEN)	3	3
2	I Falconi (USA)	6	6

Second round
6	MF Álvarez Terán (BOL)	4	3
WC	J Roland (PUR)	6	6
I Robbiani (PAR)	3	1
4	F Molinero (ARG)	6	6
8	C Castaño (COL)	2	1
B Botto (PER)	6	6
G Dabrowski (CAN)	2	0
2	I Falconi (USA)	6	6

Quarterfinals
WC	J Roland (PUR)	4	2
4	F Molinero (ARG)	6	6
B Botto (PER)	4	0
2	I Falconi (USA)	6	6

Semifinals
4	F Molinero (ARG)	3	4
2	I Falconi (USA)	6	6
