= Tennis at the 2011 Pan American Games – Men's singles =

Tennis – Men's singles at the 2011 Pan American Games
- Venue: Telcel Tennis Complex
- Dates: October 17 – October 22
- Competitors: 47 competitors from 21 nations

Medalists
Gold medal	Robert Farah	Colombia
Silver medal	Rogério Dutra Silva	Brazil
Bronze medal	Víctor Estrella Burgos	Dominican Republic

Men's singles
- Tennis at the 2011 Pan American Games

Events
Singles	men	women
Doubles	men	women	mixed
Qualification
- Pan American Games

The men's singles tennis event of the 2011 Pan American Games was held from October 17–22 at the Telcel Tennis Complex in Guadalajara. The defending Pan American Games champion was Flávio Saretta of Brazil.

== Seeds ==
1. Horacio Zeballos (ARG) (second round)
2. João Souza (BRA) (second round)
3. Ricardo Mello (BRA) (quarterfinals)
4. Rogério Dutra Silva (BRA) (final, silver medalist)
5. Eduardo Schwank (ARG) (second round)
6. Juan Sebastián Cabal (COL) (quarterfinals)
7. Víctor Estrella Burgos (DOM) (semifinals, bronze medalist)
8. Robert Farah (COL) (champion, gold medalist)
9. Facundo Argüello (ARG) (second round)
10. Alejandro González (COL) (quarterfinals)
11. Denis Kudla (USA) (third round)
12. Guillermo Rivera Aránguiz (CHI) (third round)
13. Jorge Aguilar (CHI) (quarterfinals)
14. Greg Ouellette (USA) (third round)
15. Nicholas Monroe (USA) (second round)
16. Christopher Díaz Figueroa (GUA) (third round)

== Draw ==
Key

- Q = Qualifier
- WC = Wild card
- LL = Lucky loser
- Alt = Alternate
- ITF = ITF entry
- PR = Protected ranking
- SR = Special ranking
- SE = Special exempt
- JE = Junior exempt
- JR = Junior Accelerator Programme entrant
- CO = College Accelerator Programme entrant
- NG = Next Gen Accelerator Program entrant
- w/o = Walkover
- r = Retired
- d = Defaulted

=== Finals ===
Quarterfinals
13	Jorge Aguilar (CHI)	0	2
8	Robert Farah (COL)	6	6
3	Ricardo Mello (BRA)	3	2
7	Víctor Estrella Burgos (DOM)	6	6
6	Juan Sebastián Cabal (COL)	6^{11}	3
4	Rogério Dutra Silva (BRA)	7^{13}	6
10	Alejandro González (COL)	6^{4}	6	5
Julio César Campozano (ECU)	7^{7}	4	7

Semifinals
8	Robert Farah (COL)	6	6
7	Víctor Estrella Burgos (DOM)	4	4
4	Rogério Dutra Silva (BRA)	6	6^{5}	7
Julio César Campozano (ECU)	4	7^{7}	5

Final (gold-medal match)
8	Robert Farah (COL)	6	6
4	Rogério Dutra Silva (BRA)	4	3
Bronze-medal match
7	Víctor Estrella Burgos (DOM)	3	7	6
Julio César Campozano (ECU)	6	5	3

=== Top half ===
==== Section 1 ====
First round
P Luisi (VEN)	2	7^{7}	0^{r}
I Miranda (PER)	6	6^{5}	2
D King (BAR)	7^{7}	5	4
D Galeano (PAR)	6^{3}	7	6
A Behar (URU)	6^{5}	4
M Doria-Medina (BOL)	7^{7}	6

Second round
1	H Zeballos (ARG)	3	4
I Miranda (PER)	6	6
WC	S Vidal (GUA)	1	4
13	J Aguilar (CHI)	6	6
11	D Kudla (USA)	6	6
D Galeano (PAR)	1	4
M Doria-Medina (BOL)	2	1
8	Robert Farah (COL)	6	6

Third round
I Miranda (PER)	3	6	3
13	J Aguilar (CHI)	6	4	6
11	D Kudla (USA)	4	4
8	Robert Farah (COL)	6	6

Quarterfinals
13	J Aguilar (CHI)	0	2
8	Robert Farah (COL)	6	6

==== Section 2 ====
First round
L Martínez (VEN)	6^{3}	7	4
I Endara (ECU)	7^{7}	5	6
N Massú (CHI)	6	6
F Sansonetti (URU)	0	1
D Garza (MEX)	6	6
WC	R Arévalo (ESA)	2	2
M Echazú (PER)	3	4
WC	M Rolle (BAH)	6	6

Second round
3	R Mello (BRA)	6	6
I Endara (ECU)	4	0
N Massú (CHI)	6	6
15	N Monroe (USA)	4	4
9	F Argüello (ARG)	2	6	5
D Garza (MEX)	6	4	7
WC	M Rolle (BAH)	2	4
7	V Estrella Burgos (DOM)	6	6

Third round
3	R Mello (BRA)	1	6	6
N Massú (CHI)	6	2	3
D Garza (MEX)	6^{6}	3
7	V Estrella Burgos (DOM)	7^{8}	6

Quarterfinals
3	R Mello (BRA)	3	2
7	V Estrella Burgos (DOM)	6	6

=== Bottom half ===
==== Section 3 ====
First round
R Recarte (VEN)	4	6	1
O Sajous (HAI)	6	2	6
C Klingemann (CAN)	3	3
R Quiroz (ECU)	6	6
J Benítez (PAR)	2	5
D Beretta (PER)	6	7
WC	W Dorante (CUB)	3	2
WC	A Llompart (PUR)	6	6

Second round
6	JS Cabal (COL)	6	0	7^{7}
O Sajous (HAI)	2	6	6^{2}
R Quiroz (ECU)	5	4
12	G Rivera Aránguiz (CHI)	7	6
14	G Ouellette (USA)	0	6	6
D Beretta (PER)	6	2	4
WC	A Llompart (PUR)	1	2
4	R Dutra Silva (BRA)	6	6

Third round
6	JS Cabal (COL)	4	6	6
12	G Rivera Aránguiz (CHI)	6	4	2
14	G Ouellette (USA)	4	5
4	R Dutra Silva (BRA)	6	7

Quarterfinals
6	JS Cabal (COL)	6^{11}	3
4	R Dutra Silva (BRA)	7^{13}	6

==== Section 4 ====
First round
M Arévalo (ESA)	6	6
H Lewis (BAR)	4	4
C Ramírez (MEX)	6	6
F Zeballos (BOL)	4	2
DA López (PAR)	7^{8}	6
M Cuevas (URU)	6^{6}	4
WC	J Hernández (DOM)	4	4
JC Campozano (ECU)	6	6

Second round
5	E Schwank (ARG)	4	1
M Arévalo (ESA)	6	6
C Ramírez (MEX)	7^{7}	1	6^{1}
10	A González (COL)	6^{4}	6	7^{7}
16	C Díaz Figueroa (GUA)	7^{7}	7^{7}
DA López (PAR)	6^{4}	6^{5}
JC Campozano (ECU)	7	7
2	J Souza (BRA)	5	5

Third round
M Arévalo (ESA)	3^{r}
10	A González (COL)	5
16	C Díaz Figueroa (GUA)	6^{5}	6	5
JC Campozano (ECU)	7^{7}	4	7

Quarterfinals
10	A González (COL)	6^{4}	6	5
JC Campozano (ECU)	7^{7}	4	7
