= Judo at the 2011 Pan American Games – Qualification =

140 (10 per weight class) athletes will qualify to compete in judo. The top ten nations after a series of qualification tournaments will qualify. If Mexico fails to be in the top ten it will take the place of the tenth place country.

== Qualification summary ==
| NOC | Men | | | | | | | Women | | | | | | | Total |
| NOC | -60kg | -66kg | -73kg | -81kg | -90kg | -100kg | +100kg | -48kg | -52kg | -57kg | -63kg | -70kg | -78kg | +78kg | Total |
|---|---|---|---|---|---|---|---|---|---|---|---|---|---|---|---|
| Argentina | | | X | X | X | X | X | X | X | X | X | | X | X | 11 |
| Brazil | X | X | X | X | X | X | X | X | X | X | X | X | X | X | 14 |
| Canada | X | X | X | X | X | X | | | X | X | X | X | X | | 11 |
| Chile | | X | X | X | X | | | X | | X | | | | | 6 |
| Colombia | X | | X | | X | X | X | X | X | X | X | X | X | | 11 |
| Cuba | X | X | X | X | X | X | X | X | X | X | X | X | X | X | 14 |
| Ecuador | X | X | | | | | | X | | X | | X | X | X | 7 |
| El Salvador | | X | | | | X | | | | | | X | | | 3 |
| Guatemala | | | | | | | X | | | | X | X | X | | 4 |
| Haiti | | | | | | | | | X | | | | | | 1 |
| Honduras | X | | | | | | | | | | | | | | 1 |
| Mexico | X | X | X | X | X | X | X | X | X | X | X | X | X | X | 14 |
| Peru | X | X | | X | | | X | X | X | | | | | | 6 |
| Puerto Rico | | | | X | | X | X | | | | X | X | | X | 6 |
| United States | X | X | X | X | X | X | X | | X | X | X | X | X | X | 13 |
| Uruguay | | | X | | | | | | | | | | | | 1 |
| Venezuela | X | X | X | X | X | X | X | X | X | X | X | | X | X | 13 |
| Total: 17 NOCs | 10 | 10 | 10 | 10 | 9 | 10 | 10 | 9 | 10 | 10 | 10 | 10 | 10 | 8 | 136 |

== 60kg Men ==
| Criteria | Vacancies | Qualified |
|---|---|---|
| Top 10 | 10 | Brazil; Mexico; Peru; Ecuador; Cuba; Canada; Venezuela; Colombia; Honduras; United States |
| TOTAL | 10 | |

== 66kg Men ==
| Criteria | Vacancies | Qualified |
|---|---|---|
| Top 9 | 9 | Venezuela; Brazil; El Salvador; United States; Chile; Peru; Canada; Cuba; Ecuador |
| Host nation | 1 | Mexico |
| TOTAL | 10 | |

== 73kg Men ==
| Criteria | Vacancies | Qualified |
|---|---|---|
| Top 9 | 9 | Brazil; Cuba; Argentina; Canada; Colombia; Uruguay; United States; Venezuela; Chile |
| Host nation | 1 | Mexico |
| TOTAL | 10 | |

== 81kg Men ==
| Criteria | Vacancies | Qualified |
|---|---|---|
| Top 9 | 9 | Brazil; United States; Cuba; Canada; Venezuela; Peru; Argentina; Puerto Rico; Chile |
| Host nation | 1 | Mexico |
| TOTAL | 10 | |

== 90kg Men ==
| Criteria | Vacancies | Qualified |
|---|---|---|
| Top 10 | 10 | Brazil; Argentina; Cuba; Venezuela; Canada; Mexico; Chile; United States; Colombia; ~~Puerto Rico~~ |
| TOTAL | 9 | |

== 100kg Men ==
| Criteria | Vacancies | Qualified |
|---|---|---|
| Top 10 | 10 | Brazil; Cuba; Argentina; Mexico; Puerto Rico; Venezuela; United States; Canada; Colombia; El Salvador |
| TOTAL | 10 | |

== +100kg Men ==
| Criteria | Vacancies | Qualified |
|---|---|---|
| Top 10 | 10 | Brazil; Cuba; Colombia; Argentina; Mexico; Puerto Rico; United States; Peru; Venezuela; Guatemala |
| TOTAL | 10 | |

== 48kg Women ==
| Criteria | Vacancies | Qualified |
|---|---|---|
| Top 10 | 10 | Brazil; Argentina; Mexico; Cuba; Colombia; Peru; ~~Canada~~; ~~United States~~; Chile; Ecuador |
| TOTAL | 8 | |

== 52kg Women ==
| Criteria | Vacancies | Qualified |
|---|---|---|
| Top 10 | 10 | Brazil; United States; Cuba; Argentina; Colombia; Venezuela; Canada; Peru; Mexico; Haiti |
| TOTAL | 10 | |

== 57kg Women ==
| Criteria | Vacancies | Qualified |
|---|---|---|
| Top 10 | 10 | Brazil; Cuba; Argentina; Colombia; Ecuador; Canada; United States; Venezuela; Mexico; Chile |
| TOTAL | 10 | |

== 63kg Women ==
| Criteria | Vacancies | Qualified |
|---|---|---|
| Top 10 | 10 | Brazil; Cuba; Colombia; United States; Puerto Rico; Argentina; Mexico; Canada; Venezuela; Guatemala |
| TOTAL | 10 | |

== 70kg Women ==
| Criteria | Vacancies | Qualified |
|---|---|---|
| Top 9 | 9 | Brazil; Cuba; Canada; Colombia; El Salvador; Ecuador; Puerto Rico; Guatemala; United States |
| Host nation | 1 | Mexico |
| TOTAL | 10 | |

== 78kg Women ==
| Criteria | Vacancies | Qualified |
|---|---|---|
| Top 10 | 10 | Colombia; Cuba; Brazil; Argentina; United States; Canada; Guatemala; Ecuador; Venezuela; Mexico |
| TOTAL | 10 | |

== +78kg Women ==
| Criteria | Vacancies | Qualified |
|---|---|---|
| Top 10 | 10 | Cuba; Brazil; Puerto Rico; Mexico; Venezuela; Ecuador; ~~Guatemala~~; United States; Argentina; ~~Canada~~ |
| TOTAL | 8 | |

- Countries indicated with a strike have decline their quota spot.
