= Wrestling at the 2011 Pan American Games – Qualification =

Qualification was done at the 2011 Pan American Championship in Rionegro, Colombia between May 6 and 8, 2011. The top eight athletes will qualify in each weight category. Mexico is guaranteed a full team granted if they compete with a full team at the qualification tournament, but if it does not manage to be in the top eight, the athlete from Mexico will take the slot allotted to the eight place athlete. There are also six wild cards to be distributed. Therefore, there is a total quota of 150 athletes.

== Qualification summary ==
Nation	Men's Freestyle							Men's Greco-Roman							Women's Freestyle				Total
Nation	55kg	60kg	66kg	74kg	84kg	96kg	120kg	55kg	60kg	66kg	74kg	84kg	96kg	120kg	48kg	55kg	63kg	72kg	Total
Argentina		X	X							X			X		X		X		6
Brazil					X		X	X	X			X				X		X	7
Canada	X	X	X	X	X	X	X			X		X	X		X	X	X	X	14
Chile	X																		1
Colombia		X	X	X	X	X		X	X	X	X	X	X	X	X		X		14
Cuba	X	X	X	X		X	X	X	X	X	X	X	X	X			X	X	15
Dominican Republic	X	X					X	X	X	X	X	X		X			X	X	11
Ecuador	X		X	X			X			X				X	X	X			8
El Salvador		X													X				2
Guatemala	X														X				2
Honduras						X				X			X						3
Mexico	X	X	X	X	X	X	X	X	X	X	X	X	X	X	X	X		X	17
Nicaragua								X											1
Panama					X						X							X	3
Peru				X				X			X					X	X		5
Puerto Rico		X	X		X	X	X		X		X			X	X	X		X	11
United States	X		X	X	X	X	X		X	X	X	X	X	X	X	X	X		15
Venezuela	X	X	X	X	X	X		X	X	X		X	X	X		X	X	X	15
Total: 18 NOCs	9	9	9	8	8	8	8	8	8	10	8	8	8	8	9	8	8	8	150

== Qualification by category ==
=== 55kg Men's Freestyle ===
Competition	Location	Vacancies	Qualified
2011 Pan American Championship	(Colombia) Rionegro	8	Cuba; United States; Guatemala; Venezuela; Dominican Republic; Canada; Ecuador; Mexico
Wild Card	-	-	Chile
TOTAL		9	

=== 60kg Men's Freestyle ===
Competition	Location	Vacancies	Qualified
2011 Pan American Championship	(Colombia) Rionegro	8	Puerto Rico; Canada; Dominican Republic; Cuba; Argentina; Venezuela; Mexico; Colombia
Wild Card	-	1	El Salvador
TOTAL		9	

=== 66kg Men's Freestyle ===
Competition	Location	Vacancies	Qualified
2011 Pan American Championship	(Colombia) Rionegro	8	Cuba; United States; Venezuela; Canada; Argentina; Colombia; Ecuador; Mexico
Wild Card	-	1	Puerto Rico
TOTAL		9	

=== 74kg Men's Freestyle ===
Competition	Location	Vacancies	Qualified
2011 Pan American Championship	(Colombia) Rionegro	7	United States; Cuba; Peru; Venezuela; Ecuador; Canada; Colombia
Host Nation	-	1	Mexico
Wild Card	-	-	
TOTAL		8	

=== 84kg Men's Freestyle ===
Competition	Location	Vacancies	Qualified
2011 Pan American Championship	(Colombia) Rionegro	7	Venezuela; United States; Canada; Colombia; Mexico; Puerto Rico; Panama; Brazil
Wild Card	-	-	
TOTAL		8	

=== 96kg Men's Freestyle ===
Competition	Location	Vacancies	Qualified
2011 Pan American Championship	(Colombia) Rionegro	8	Cuba; Canada; Mexico; Venezuela; Colombia; United States; Honduras; Puerto Rico
Wild Card	-	-	
TOTAL		8	

=== 120kg Men's Freestyle ===
Competition	Location	Vacancies	Qualified
2011 Pan American Championship	(Colombia) Rionegro	8	United States; Cuba; Brazil; Canada; Puerto Rico; Dominican Republic; Mexico; Ecuador
Wild Card	-	-	
TOTAL		8	

=== 55kg Men's Greco-Roman ===
Competition	Location	Vacancies	Qualified
2011 Pan American Championship	(Colombia) Rionegro	8	Cuba; Venezuela; Peru; Dominican Republic; Mexico; Colombia; Nicaragua; Brazil
Wild Card	-	-	
TOTAL		8	

=== 60kg Men's Greco-Roman ===
Competition	Location	Vacancies	Qualified
2011 Pan American Championship	(Colombia) Rionegro	8	Cuba; Venezuela; Colombia; Dominican Republic; Puerto Rico; Mexico; Brazil; United States
Wild Card	-	-	
TOTAL		8	

=== 66kg Men's Greco-Roman ===
Competition	Location	Vacancies	Qualified
2011 Pan American Championship	(Colombia) Rionegro	8	Cuba; United States; Ecuador; Colombia; Canada; Dominican Republic; Venezuela; Mexico
Wild Card	-	2	Argentina; Honduras
TOTAL		10	

=== 74kg Men's Greco-Roman ===
Competition	Location	Vacancies	Qualified
2011 Pan American Championship	(Colombia) Rionegro	8	Cuba; United States; Peru; Mexico; Puerto Rico; Dominican Republic; Colombia; Panama
Wild Card	-	-	
TOTAL		8	

=== 84kg Men's Greco-Roman ===
Competition	Location	Vacancies	Qualified
2011 Pan American Championship	(Colombia) Rionegro	7	Cuba; Dominican Republic; Venezuela; United States; Canada; Colombia; Brazil
Host Nation	-	1	Mexico
Wild Card	-	-	
TOTAL		8	

=== 96kg Men's Greco-Roman ===
Competition	Location	Vacancies	Qualified
2011 Pan American Championship	(Colombia) Rionegro	7	United States; Cuba; Canada; Venezuela; Argentina; Colombia; Honduras
Host Nation	-	1	Mexico
Wild Card	-	-	
TOTAL		8	

=== 120kg Men's Greco-Roman ===
Competition	Location	Vacancies	Qualified
2011 Pan American Championship	(Colombia) Rionegro	8	Cuba; United States; Dominican Republic; Venezuela; Mexico; Colombia; Puerto Rico; Ecuador
Wild Card	-	-	
TOTAL		8	

=== 48kg Women's Freestyle ===
Competition	Location	Vacancies	Qualified
2011 Pan American Championship	(Colombia) Rionegro	7	Canada; Argentina; Ecuador; Colombia; El Salvador; Puerto Rico; United States
Host Nation	-	1	Mexico
Wild Card	-	1	Peru
TOTAL		9	

=== 55kg Women's Freestyle ===
Competition	Location	Vacancies	Qualified
2011 Pan American Championship	(Colombia) Rionegro	8	United States; Peru; Mexico; Brazil; Puerto Rico; Ecuador; Venezuela; Canada
Wild Card	-	-	
TOTAL		8	

=== 63kg Women's Freestyle ===
Competition	Location	Vacancies	Qualified
2011 Pan American Championship	(Colombia) Rionegro	8	United States; Canada; Colombia; Cuba; Venezuela; Dominican Republic; Peru; Argentina
Wild Card	-	-	
TOTAL		8	

- A Mexican athlete did not compete in the weight category and the qualification tournament, therefore Mexico will not qualify an athlete.

=== 72kg Women's Freestyle ===
Competition	Location	Vacancies	Qualified
2011 Pan American Championship	(Colombia) Rionegro	8	Canada; Brazil; Cuba; Venezuela; Puerto Rico; Dominican Republic; Panama; Mexico
Wild Card	-	-	
TOTAL		8	

- There are 6 wild card spots that will be distributed among all weight classes.
