= Tennis at the 2011 Pan American Games =

- Date: 17–22 October
- Edition: 15
- Location: Telcel Tennis Complex

Champions

Men's singles
- Robert Farah (COL)

Women's singles
- Irina Falconi (USA)

Men's doubles
- Juan Sebastián Cabal / (Colombia) Robert Farah (COL)

Women's doubles
- María Irigoyen / Florencia Molinero (ARG)

Mixed doubles
- Ana Paula de la Peña / Santiago González (MEX)
- Pan American Games

Tennis competitions at the 2011 Pan American Games in Guadalajara were held from October 17 to October 22 at the Telcel Tennis Complex. The draw for the events was conducted on October 16, 2011.

The event was part of the qualification criteria for the tennis tournament at the 2012 Summer Olympics. The winners of the five competitions had priority entrance into the tennis event, if they were not directly qualified and were near the top 56 in the world. The players also had to be from a country that had not filled its four player quota.

The mixed doubles event was being held for the first time since the 1995 Pan American Games in Mar del Plata, because the event was added to the tennis program of the 2012 Summer Olympics in London, Great Britain.

== Schedule ==
October	17	18	19	20	21	22
Men's singles	Round of 48	Round of 32	Round of 16	Quarterfinals	Semifinals	Bronze final Gold final
Women's singles	Round of 32	Round of 16	Quarterfinals	Semifinals	Bronze final Gold final	
Men's doubles		Round of 24	Round of 16	Quarterfinals	Semifinals	Bronze final Gold final
Women's doubles		Round of 16	Quarterfinals	Semifinals	Bronze final Gold final	
Mixed doubles	Round of 16		Round of 8	Semifinals	Bronze final Gold final	

== Medal summary ==
=== Medal table ===
* Host nation (Mexico)

Rank	Nation	Gold	Silver	Bronze	Total
1	Colombia	2	0	1	3
2	United States	1	1	2	4
3	Argentina	1	0	0	1
3	Mexico*	1	0	0	1
5	Brazil	0	1	1	2
6	Chile	0	1	0	1
6	Ecuador	0	1	0	1
6	Puerto Rico	0	1	0	1
9	Dominican Republic	0	0	1	1
Totals (9 entries)		5	5	5	15

=== Medal events ===
Event	Gold	Silver	Bronze
Men's singles	Robert Farah; Colombia	Rogério Dutra da Silva; Brazil	Víctor Estrella; Dominican Republic
Women's singles	Irina Falconi; United States	Monica Puig; Puerto Rico	Christina McHale; United States
Men's doubles	Colombia; Juan Sebastián Cabal; Robert Farah	Ecuador; Júlio César Campozano; Roberto Quiroz	United States; Nicholas Monroe; Greg Ouellette
Women's doubles	Argentina; María Irigoyen; Florencia Molinero	United States; Irina Falconi; Christina McHale	Colombia; Catalina Castaño; Mariana Duque Mariño
Mixed doubles	Mexico; Ana Paula de la Peña; Santiago González	Chile; Andrea Koch Benvenuto; Guillermo Rivera-Aránguiz	Brazil; Ana Clara Duarte; Rogério Dutra da Silva

== Qualification ==
Countries can enter a maximum of six athletes, three men and three women. 42 men and 28 women were selected through the ATP and WTA rankings (on August 29, 2011). There was a further six wild cards available for men and four for the women. Each of the players could be entered in two events. From each country, there could be a maximum of three players in the singles draws, while there could be a maximum of one doubles team in each of the doubles draws. Seeding was based on ATP and WTA rankings at the time of the draw (October 16).

Nation	Men	Women	Total
Argentina	3	3	6
Bahamas	1		1
Barbados	2		2
Bolivia	2	1	3
Brazil	3	3	6
Canada	2	1	3
Chile	3	3	3
Colombia	3	3	6
Cuba	1	1	2
Dominican Republic	2		2
Ecuador	3	1	4
El Salvador	2		2
Guatemala	2		2
Haiti	1		1
Mexico	3	3	6
Paraguay	2	2	4
Peru	3	3	6
Puerto Rico	1	2	3
United States	3	2	5
Uruguay	3		3
Venezuela	3	3	6
Total athletes	48	31	80
Total NOCs	20	14	21 NOCs
