= Athletics at the 2011 Pan American Games – Women's 3000 metres steeplechase =

Women's 3000 metres steeplechase at the 2011 Pan American Games
- Venue: Telmex Athletics Stadium
- Dates: October 28
- Competitors: 12 from 10 nations
- Winning time: 10:03.16

Medalists
Gold medal	Sara Hall	United States
Silver medal	Ángela Figueroa	Colombia
Bronze medal	Sabine Heitling	Brazil

The women's 3000 metres steeplechase competition of the athletics events at the 2011 Pan American Games took place on the 28th October at the Telmex Athletics Stadium. The defending Pan American Games champion was Sabine Heitling of Brazil.

== Records ==
Prior to this competition, the existing world and Pan American Games records were as follows:

World record	Gulnara Samitova-Galkina (RUS)	8:58.81	Beijing, China	August 17, 2008
Pan American Games record	Sabine Heitling (BRA)	9:51.13	Rio de Janeiro, Brazil	July 28, 2007

== Qualification ==
Each National Olympic Committee (NOC) was able to enter two athletes regardless if they had met the qualification standard.

== Schedule ==
Date	Time	Round
October 28, 2011	16:35	Final

== Results ==
All times shown are in seconds.

KEY:	q	Fastest non-qualifiers	Q	Qualified	NR	National record	PB	Personal best	SB	Seasonal best	DQ	Disqualified

=== Final ===
Held on October 28.

Rank	Name	Nationality	Time	Notes
1st place, gold medalist(s)	Sara Hall	United States	10:03.16	
2nd place, silver medalist(s)	Ángela Figueroa	Colombia	10:10.14	
3rd place, bronze medalist(s)	Sabine Heitling	Brazil	10:10.98	
4	Mason Cathey	United States	10:19.10	
5	Sara Prieto	Mexico	10:23.22	PB
6	Sandra Lopez	Mexico	10:34.90	
7	Yoni Ninahuaman	Peru	11:00.30	
8	Zuna Portillo	El Salvador	11:18.40	
9	Marlene Acuña	Ecuador	11:24.12	
10	Evonne Marroquin	Guatemala	11:50.31	
11	Hilaria Patzy	Bolivia	11:56.42	
	Beverly Ramos	Puerto Rico	DNF	
