= Weightlifting at the 2011 Pan American Games – Men's 94 kg =

Weightlifting – Men's 94 kg at the 2011 Pan American Games
- Venue: Weightlifting Forum
- Dates: October 26
- Competitors: 10 from 8 nations

Medalists
Gold medal	Javier Venega	Cuba
Silver medal	Herbys Márquez	Venezuela
Bronze medal	Eduardo Gudamud	Ecuador

The men's 94 kg competition of the weightlifting events at the 2011 Pan American Games in Guadalajara, Mexico, was held on October 26 at the Weightlifting Forum. The defending champion was Yoandry Hernández from Cuba.

Each lifter performed in both the snatch and clean and jerk lifts, with the final score being the sum of the lifter's best result in each. The athlete received three attempts in each of the two lifts; the score for the lift was the heaviest weight successfully lifted. This weightlifting event was the third heaviest men's event at the weightlifting competition, limiting competitors to a maximum of 94 kilograms of body mass.

== Schedule ==
All times are Central Standard Time (UTC-6).

Date	Time	Round
October 26, 2011	14:00	Final

== Results ==
10 athletes from 8 countries took part.

Rank	Name	Country	Group	B.weight (kg)	Snatch (kg)	Clean & Jerk (kg)	Total (kg)
1st place, gold medalist(s)	Javier Venega	Cuba	A	92.61	170	200	370
2nd place, silver medalist(s)	Herbys Márquez	Venezuela	A	93.01	162	203	365
3rd place, bronze medalist(s)	Eduardo Gudamud	Ecuador	A	93.81	165	200	365
4	Jonathan North	United States	A	92.30	155	183	338
5	Jared Fleming	United States	A	91.71	155	180	335
6	Moises Cartagena	Puerto Rico	A	93.20	151	177	328
7	Emmanuel Suarez	Mexico	A	92.70	136	185	321
8	Roberto Rosado	Puerto Rico	A	92.68	140	180	320
9	Joel Pavon	Honduras	A	92.58	135	175	310
10	Hernán Viera	Peru	A	93.15	135	170	305
