= Judo at the 2011 Pan American Games – Women's 48 kg =

Women's 48 kg at the 2011 Pan American Games
- Venue: CODE II Gymnasium
- Dates: October 29
- Competitors: 9 from 9 nations

Medalists
| Gold medal | Paula Pareto | Argentina |
| Silver medal | Dayaris Mestre Alvarez | Cuba |
| Bronze medal | Angela Woosley | United States |
| Bronze medal | Sarah Menezes | Brazil |

The women's 48 kg competition of the judo events at the 2011 Pan American Games in Guadalajara, Mexico, was held on October 29 at the CODE II Gymanasium. The defending champion was Yanet Bermoy of Cuba.

== Schedule ==
All times are Central Standard Time (UTC-6).

| Date | Time | Round |
|---|---|---|
| October 29, 2011 | 11:16 | Preliminary bout |
| October 29, 2011 | 11:32 | Quarterfinals |
| October 29, 2011 | 12:04 | Repechage |
| October 29, 2011 | 12:52 | Semifinals |
| October 29, 2011 | 17:28 | Bronze medal matches |
| October 29, 2011 | 17:40 | Final |

== Results ==
Legend

- 1st number = Ippon
- 2nd number = Waza-ari
- 3rd number = Yuko

=== Bracket ===
Preliminaries
Paula Pareto (ARG) | 110
Lesly Cano (PER) | 000

Quarter Finals
Sarah Menezes (BRA) | 100
Angela Woosley (USA) | 000
Dayaris Mestre Alvarez (CUB) | 100
Diana Cobos (ECU) | 000
Paula Pareto (ARG) | 002
Luz Adiela Alvarez (COL) | 000
Edna Carrillo (MEX) | 012
Antonieta Galleguillos (CHI) | 000

Semi Finals
Sarah Menezes (BRA) | 000
Dayaris Mestre Alvarez (CUB) | 001
Paula Pareto (ARG) | 113
Edna Carrillo (MEX) | 010

Final
Dayaris Mestre Alvarez (CUB) | 001
Paula Pareto (ARG) | 110

=== Repechage round ===
Two bronze medals were awarded.

First round
Bye
Angela Woosley (USA)
Bye
Diana Cobos (ECU)
Lesly Cano (PER) | 000
Luz Adiela Alvarez (COL) | 120
Bye
Antonieta Galleguillos (CHI)

Semifinals
Angela Woosley (USA) | 100
Diana Cobos (ECU) | 000
Luz Adiela Alvarez (COL) | 100
Antonieta Galleguillos (CHI) | 000

Finals
Angela Woosley (USA) | 011
Edna Carrillo (MEX) | 002
Luz Adiela Alvarez (COL) | 000
Sarah Menezes (BRA) | 101
