= Water skiing at the 2011 Pan American Games – Men's wakeboard =

Men's wakeboard at the 2011 Pan American Games
- Venue: Boca Laguna Water Ski Track
- Dates: October 20 – October 23
- Competitors: 8 from 8 nations

Medalists
Gold medal	Andrew Adkison	United States
Silver medal	Marcelo Giardi	Brazil
Bronze medal	Alejo de Palma	Argentina

The men's wakeboard competition of the Water skiing events at the 2011 Pan American Games in Guadalajara were held from October 20 to October 23 at the Boca Laguna Water Ski Track. The defending champion was Marcelo Giardi of Brazil.

== Schedule ==
All times are Central Standard time (UTC-6).

Date	Start	Round
Thursday, October 20	9:00	Semifinals
Saturday, October 22	9:00	Finals

== Results ==
As there were only eight competitors the semi-final served as a ranking round as all competitors advanced to the final round.

=== Semifinal ===
Rank	Athlete	Total
1	Aaron Rathy (CAN)	85.00
2	Andrew Adkison (USA)	84.45
3	Marcelo Giardi (BRA)	75.66
4	Alejo de Palma (ARG)	66.23
5	Jorge Garizurieta (MEX)	57.34
6	Juan Velez (COL)	37.33
7	Jamie Bazan (ECU)	34.45
8	Sebastian Harmsen (PER)	20.00

=== Final ===
Rank	Athlete	Total
1st place, gold medalist(s)	Andrew Adkison (USA)	80.00
2nd place, silver medalist(s)	Marcelo Giardi (BRA)	65.90
3rd place, bronze medalist(s)	Alejo de Palma (ARG)	65.11
4	Jorge Garizurieta (MEX)	57.34
5	Juan Velez (COL)	45.44
6	Jamie Bazan (ECU)	38.11
7	Sebastian Harmsen (PER)	22.89
DQ	Aaron Rathy (CAN)	72.67
