= Eduardo Guadamud =

Ecuadorian weightlifter (born 1986)

Personal information
- Full name: Eduardo Francisco Guadamud Braulio
- Born: 11 June 1986 (age 40) Esmeraldas, Ecuador
Medal record
Men's Weightlifting
Representing Ecuador
Pan American Games
Bronze medal – third place	2011 Guadalajara	94 kg
Pan American Championships
Silver medal – second place	2008 Callao	94 kg

Eduardo Francisco Guadamud Braulio (born 11 June 1986, in Esmeraldas) is an Ecuadorian weightlifter.

At the 2008 Pan American Weightlifting Championships he won silver in the 94 kg category, with a total of 355 kg.

He competed in the 94 kg class at the 2008 Summer Olympics, but did not finish. He won the bronze medal at the 2011 Pan American Games in the 94 kg event.

== Major competitions ==
Year	Venue	Weight	Snatch (kg)				Clean & Jerk (kg)				Total	Rank
Year	Venue	Weight	1	2	3	Rank	1	2	3	Rank	Total	Rank
Pan American Games
2011	Guadalajara, Mexico	94 kg	160	165	~~170~~	—N/a	~~195~~	195	200	—N/a	365	3rd place, bronze medalist(s)

== Personal bests ==
- Snatch: 175.0 kg +
- Clean and jerk: 215.0 kg +
- Squat: 2 × 310 kg
