= Ecuador at the 2011 Pan American Games =

- IOC code: ECU
- NOC: Comité Olímpico Ecuatoriano
- Website: www.coe.org.ec

in Guadalajara 14–30 October 2011
- Competitors: 170 in 28 sports
- Flag bearer: Jorge David Arroyo
- Medals Ranked 10th: Gold 7 Silver 8 Bronze 9 Total 24

Pan American Games appearances (overview)
- 1951; 1955; 1959; 1963; 1967; 1971; 1975; 1979; 1983; 1987; 1991; 1995; 1999; 2003; 2007; 2011; 2015; 2019; 2023; 2027

Ecuador will compete at the 2011 Pan American Games in Guadalajara, Mexico from October 14 to 30, 2011. Ecuador's team will consist of 170 athletes in 27 sports.

== Medalists ==
Medal	Name	Sport	Event	Date
Gold	Alexandra Escobar	Weightlifting	Women's 58 kg	October 24
Gold	Jorge Bolaños	Roller skating	Men's 10,000 metres points and elimination	October 27
Gold	Jorge Arroyo	Weightlifting	Men's 105 kg	October 27
Gold	Oliba Nieve	Weightlifting	Women's +75 kg	October 27
Gold	Ytalo Perea	Boxing	Men's Super heavyweight +91 kg	October 29
Gold	César de Cesare	Canoeing	Men's K-1 200 metres	October 29
Gold	Daniel Viveros	Karate	Men's 67 kg	October 29
Silver	Júlio César Campozano; Roberto Quiroz	Tennis	Men's doubles	October 22
Silver	Byron Piedra	Athletics	Men's 5,000 metres	October 24
Silver	Ricardo Flores	Weightlifting	Men's 77 kg	October 25
Silver	Byron Piedra	Athletics	Men's 1,500 metres	October 26
Silver	Lucy Jaramillo	Athletics	Women's 400 metres hurdles	October 26
Silver	Diego Ferrín	Athletics	Men's high jump	October 27
Silver	Jaime Cortez	Boxing	Men's Middleweight 75 kg	October 28
Silver	Julio Castillo	Boxing	Men's Heavyweight 91 kg	October 28
Bronze	Alberto Mino	Table tennis	Men's singles	October 20
Bronze	María Córdova; María Muñoz	Racquetball	Women's doubles	October 22
Bronze	Lissette Antes	Wrestling	Women's Freestyle 55 kg	October 22
Bronze	Juan Carlos Valverde	Wrestling	Men's freestyle 55 kg	October 23
Bronze	Yoan Blanco	Wrestling	Men's freestyle 66 kg	October 23
Bronze	Ecuador	Racquetball	Men's team	October 24
Bronze	Ecuador	Racquetball	Women's team	October 24
Bronze	Carlos Góngora	Boxing	Men's Light heavyweight 81 kg	October 26
Bronze	Eduardo Guadamud	Weightlifting	Men's 94 kg	October 26

== Archery ==
Ecuador has qualified three male and one female athletes in the archery competition.

Men

Athlete	Event	Ranking Round		Round of 32	Round of 16	Quarterfinals	Semifinals	Final	Rank
Athlete	Event	Score	Seed	Opposition Score	Opposition Score	Opposition Score	Opposition Score	Opposition Score	Rank
Kevin Vargas	Men's individual	1248	21	X Rezende (BRA); L 0–6	Did not advance				17
Martin Lazo	Men's individual	1188	29	J Serrano (MEX); L 0–6	Did not advance				17
Diego Ramos	Men's individual	1091	32	B Ellison (USA); L 1–7	Did not advance				17
Diego Ramos; Kevin Vargas; Martin Lazo	Men's team	3527	9		El Salvador; L 196–218	Did not advance			9

Women

Athlete	Event	Ranking Round		Round of 32	Round of 16	Quarterfinals	Semifinals	Final	Rank
Athlete	Event	Score	Seed	Opposition Score	Opposition Score	Opposition Score	Opposition Score	Opposition Score	Rank
Stefania Mora	Women's individual	1215	22	M Avita (MEX); L 2–6	Did not advance				17

== Athletics ==
=== Men ===
==== Track and road events ====
Event	Athletes	Heats		Semifinal		Final	
Event	Athletes	Time	Rank	Time	Rank	Time	Rank
100 m	Franklin Andres Nazareno	10.52	4	Did not advance			
200 m	Franklin Andres Nazareno	21.45	6 q	21.48	8	Did not advance	
200 m	Alex Leonardo Quiñones	20.73 PB	1 Q	20.49 PB	3 q	20.86	6
1500 m	Byron Efren Piedra					3:53.45	2nd place, silver medalist(s)
5000 m	Byron Efren Piedra					14:15.74	2nd place, silver medalist(s)
10000 m	Byron Efren Piedra					DNF	
110 m hurdles	Jhon Daniel Tamayo			14.22	7	Did not advance	
400 m hurdles	Emerson Alejandro Chala			53.53	6	Did not advance	
3000 m steeplechase	Cristian Andres Patiño					DNF	
4 × 100 m relay	Jhon Daniel Tamayo; Franklin Andres Nazareno; Alex Leonardo Quiñones; Hugo Dionicio Chila; Luis Alexander Moran			40.23 SB	3 Q	39.76 SB	5
20 km walk	Jaime Rolando Saquipay					1:22:57	4
50 km walk	Jaime Rolando Saquipay					DNF	
50 km walk	Cristian Andres Chocho					DSQ	
Marathon	Franklin Bolivar Tenorio					2:28:25	13

==== Field events ====
Event	Athletes	Semifinal		Final	
Event	Athletes	Result	Rank	Result	Rank
High jump	Diego Javier Ferrin			2.30 m. PB	2nd place, silver medalist(s)
Long jump	Diego Javier Ferrin	7.63 m.	4	7.33 m.	11

=== Women ===
==== Track and road events ====
Event	Athletes	Semifinal		Final	
Event	Athletes	Result	Rank	Result	Rank
200 m	Erika Benilda Chavez	23.67	5	Did not advance	
100 m hurdles	Lina Flórez	14.37	7	Did not advance	
400 m hurdles	Luci Maria Del Carmen Jaramillo	58.54 PB	2 Q	56.95	2nd place, silver medalist(s)
3000 m steeplechase	Marlene Concepción Acuña			11:24.12	9
4 × 100 m relay	Winnie Daniela Castillo; Celene Alejandra Ceballos; Carla Pamela Chala; Erika Benilda Chavez			46.18 NR	6
4 × 400 m relay	Luci Maria Del Carmen Jaramillo; Celene Alejandra Ceballos; Carla Pamela Chala; Erika Benilda Chavez			3:45.59 NR	6
Marathon	Rosa Alva Chacha			2:48:40	8
20 km walk	Yadira Alexandra Guaman			1:38:42	8
20 km walk	Paola Bibiana Perez			DSQ	

==== Field events ====
Event	Athletes	Final	
Event	Athletes	Result	Rank
Triple jump	Mayra Nadia Pachito	12.74 m.	11
Hammer throw	Zuleyma Eloisa Mina	57.16 m.	14

== Badminton ==
Ecuador has qualified one male and one female athlete in the badminton competition.

Men

Athlete	Event	First round	Second round	Third round	Quarterfinals	Semifinals	Final	Rank
Athlete	Event	Opposition Result	Opposition Result	Opposition Result	Opposition Result	Opposition Result	Opposition Result	Rank
Sebastian Teran	Men's singles	BYE	N Javier (DOM); L 1–2 (21–17, 11–21, 12–21)	Did not advance				

Women

Athlete	Event	First round	Second round	Third round	Quarterfinals	Semifinals	Final	Rank
Athlete	Event	Opposition Result	Opposition Result	Opposition Result	Opposition Result	Opposition Result	Opposition Result	Rank
Edith Capote	Women's singles	BYE	P Tjitrodipo (SUR); W 2–0 (21–16, 21–8)	V Montero (MEX); L 0–2 (5–21, 18–21)	Did not advance			

Mixed

Athlete	Event	First round	Second round	Quarterfinals	Semifinals	Final	Rank
Athlete	Event	Opposition Result	Opposition Result	Opposition Result	Opposition Result	Opposition Result	Rank
Sebastian Teran; Edith Capote	Mixed doubles	H Bach (USA); PL Obañana (USA); L 0–2 (10–21, 5–21)	Did not advance				

== Beach volleyball ==
Ecuador has qualified a women's team in the beach volleyball competition.

Athlete	Event	Preliminary round			Quarterfinals	Semifinals	Finals
Athlete	Event	Opposition Score	Opposition Score	Opposition Score	Opposition Score	Opposition Score	Opposition Score
Ketty Katherine Chila; Ariana Stefania Vilela	Women	Niriam Sinal (CUB); Onayamis Sinal (CUB); L 21-18, 15-21,13-15	Larissa França (BRA); Juliana Silva (BRA); L 12-21, 11-21	Ayana Dyette (TRI); Elki Phillip (TRI); W 21-14, 21-23, 15-6	did not advance		

== Bowling ==
Ecuador has qualified two male bowlers.

=== Men ===
Individual

Athlete	Event	Qualification															Eighth Finals	Quarterfinals	Semifinals	Finals	
Athlete	Event	Block 1 (Games 1–6)						Block 2 (Games 7–12)						Total	Average	Rank	Eighth Finals	Quarterfinals	Semifinals	Finals	
Athlete	Event	1	2	3	4	5	6	7	8	9	10	11	12	Total	Average	Rank	Opposition Scores	Opposition Scores	Opposition Scores	Opposition Scores	Rank
Mario Lemos	Men's individual	197	191	161	219	183	199	199	158	199	220	187	172	2285	190.4	24	Did not advance				
Diogenes Saveiro	Men's individual	177	206	175	254	194	227	215	188	142	170	207	182	2337	194.8	20	Did not advance				

Pairs

Athlete	Event	Block 1 (Games 1–6)								Block 2 (Games 7–12)								Grand total	Final Rank
Athlete	Event	1	2	3	4	5	6	Total	Average	7	8	9	10	11	12	Total	Average	Grand total	Final Rank
Mario Lemos; Diogenes Saveiro	Men's pairs	175	166	215	189	162	177	1084	180.7	143	204	224	187	169	204	2215	184.6	4674	9
Mario Lemos; Diogenes Saveiro	Men's pairs	210	182	173	182	179	193	1119	186.5	268	244	225	200	215	188	2459	204.9	4674	9

== Boxing ==
Ecuador has qualified athletes in all men's categories of the boxing competition.

Athlete	Event	Preliminaries	Quarterfinals	Semifinals	Final
Athlete	Event	Opposition Result	Opposition Result	Opposition Result	Opposition Result
Carlos Quipo	Light flyweight		Juan Medina (DOM); L 13-23	Did not advance	
Jose Meza	Flyweight		Braulio Ávila (MEX); L 12-17	Did not advance	
Luiz Poroso	Bantamweight		Óscar Valdez (MEX); L 8-22	Did not advance	
Julio Cortez	Lightweight		Angel Suarez (PUR); L 13-26	Did not advance	
Anderson Rojar	Light welterweight		Joelvis Hernandes (VEN); L 9-10	Did not advance	
Carlos Sanchez	Welterweight		Óscar Molina (MEX); L 11-13	Did not advance	
Jaime Cortez	Middleweight		Junior Castillo (DOM); W 15-8	Juan Carlos Rodríguez (VEN); W 14-8	Emilio Correa (CUB); L 6-18 (silver)
Carlos Góngora	Light heavyweight			Julio La Cruz (CUB); L 9-19 (bronze)	Did not advance
Julio Castillo	Heavyweight		Delvis Julio (COL); W 12-7	Anderson Emmanuel (BAR); W 24-6	Lenier Pero (CUB); L 10-16 (silver)
Ítalo Perea	Super heavyweight		Cristian Cabrera (DOM); W 20-10	Gerardo Bisbal (PUR); W KO	Juan Hiracheta (MEX); W 20-13 (gold)

== Canoeing ==
Ecuador has qualified one boat in the C-1 200, K1-200 and K-2 200 men's category and K1-200, K1-500 and K2-500 women's category.

Men

Athlete(s)	Event	Heats		Semifinals		Final	
Athlete(s)	Event	Time	Rank	Time	Rank	Time	Rank
Andres Lazo	C-1 200 m	41.703 QF	2			42.653	6
César de Cesare	K-1 200 m	35.796 QF	1			35.971	1st place, gold medalist(s)
César de Cesare; Yauntung Cueva	K-2 200 m	44.848 QS	5	36.519 QF	3	34.658	7

Women

Athlete(s)	Event	Heats		Semifinals		Final	
Athlete(s)	Event	Time	Rank	Time	Rank	Time	Rank
Stefanie Perdomo	K-1 200 m	46.084 QS	6	45.638	5	Did not advance	
Stefanie Perdomo	K-1 500 m	2:07.243 QS	4	2:08.659	3QF	2:05.735	9
Stefanie Perdomo; Lissette Espinoza	K-2 500 m	2:07.535 QS	5	1:58.879	4	Did not advance	

== Cycling ==
=== Road Cycling ===
==== Men ====
Athlete	Event	Time	Rank
Segundo Navarrete	Road race	3:41:56	6
Byron Guamá	Road race	3:43:55	9
José Ragonessi	Road race	3:50:58	38
Carlos Quishpe	Road race	DNF	

==== Women ====
Athlete	Event	Time	Rank
Maria Bone	Road race	2:19:29	27
Alexandra Serrano	Road race	2:18:23	18

=== Track cycling ===
==== Sprints & Pursuit ====
Athlete	Event	Qualifying		Round of 16	1/8 finals (repechage)	Quarterfinals	Semifinals	Final
Athlete	Event	Time Speed (km/h)	Rank	Opposition Time Speed	Opposition Time Speed	Opposition Time Speed	Opposition Time Speed	Opposition Time Speed
Byron Guamá; Segundo Navarrete; Carlos Quishpe; José Ragonessi	Men's team pursuit	4:21.800	8					Did not advance

==== Omnium ====
Athlete	Event	Flying Lap Time Rank	Points Race Points Rank	Elimination Race Rank	Ind Pursuit Time Rank	Scratch Race Rank	Time Trial Time Rank	Final Rank
José Ragonessi	Men	14.349; 10	72; 3	5	REL; 10	-1; 2	1:07.238; 8	38; 6
Maria Bone	Women	15.566; 8	20; 5	9	4:01.063; 10	0; 9	38.937; 8	49; 8

=== Mountain Biking ===
Women

Athlete	Event	Time	Rank
Alexandra Serrano	Cross-country	1:41:26	8

=== Cycling BMX ===
Athlete	Event	Qualifying Run 1		Qualifying Run 2		Qualifying Run 3		Qualifying	Semifinal		Final	
Athlete	Event	Time	Points	Time	Points	Time	Points	Points	Points	Rank	Time	Rank
Fausto Andres Endara	Men	40.021	4	36.210	1	35.689	2	7 Q	35.492	2 Q	35.983	4
Emilio Andres Falla	Men	37.381	3	DNF	6	DSQ	8	17	Did not advance			

== Equestrian ==
=== Dressage ===
Athlete	Horse	Event	Grand Prix		Grand Prix Special		Grand Prix Freestyle		Final Score	Rank
Athlete	Horse	Event	Score	Rank	Score	Rank	Score	Rank	Final Score	Rank
Carolina Espinoza	Amadeo	Individual	63.869	31	Did not advance					
Maria Elvira Montalvo	Navargo	Individual	60.711	40	Did not advance					
Julio Cesar Mendoza	Ivan	Individual	58.500	45	Did not advance					
Carolina Espinoza; Maria Elvira Montalvo; Julio Cesar Mendoza	Amadeo; Navargo; Ivan	Team	61.027	12					61.027	12

=== Eventing ===
Athlete	Horse	Event	Dressage		Cross-country		Jumping				Total	
Athlete	Horse	Event	Dressage		Cross-country		Qualifier		Final		Total	
Athlete	Horse	Event	Penalties	Rank	Penalties	Rank	Penalties	Rank	Penalties	Rank	Penalties	Rank
Ronald Zabala	Mr Wiseguy	Individual	52.00	9	6.40	9	EL		Did not advance			
Carlos Narvaez	Que Loco	Individual	62.40	29	20.80	23	8.00	23	15.00	19	106.20	19
Gonzalo Meza	Kosovo	Individual	63.00	31	EL		Did not advance					
Gonzalo Meza; Carlos Narvaez; Ronald Zabala	Kosovo; Que Loco; Mr Wiseguy	Team	177.40	6	964.20	6	949.60	9			2091.20	9

=== Individual jumping ===
Athlete	Horse	Event	Ind. 1st Qualifier		Ind. 2nd Qualifier			Ind. 3rd Qualifier			Ind. Final					
Athlete	Horse	Event	Ind. 1st Qualifier		Ind. 2nd Qualifier			Ind. 3rd Qualifier			Round A		Round B		Total	
Athlete	Horse	Event	Penalties	Rank	Penalties	Total	Rank	Penalties	Total	Rank	Penalties	Rank	Penalties	Rank	Penalties	Rank
Luis Ignacio Barreiro	Silverado	Individual	5.98	29	9.00	14.98	34	8.00	22.98	34	10.00	24	18.00	22	50.98	22
Ruben Russell Rodriguez	True Love Santa Monica	Individual	8.81	40	13.00	21.81	38	20.00	41.81	49	Did not advance					
Diego Javier Vivero	Neypal Du Plant	Individual	10.82	41	EL		Did not advance									
Pablo Jose Andrade	Wokina	Individual	11.59	44	5.00	16.59	22	5.00	21.59	30	5.00	14	EL		Did not advance	

=== Team jumping ===
Athlete	Horse	Event	Qualification Round		Final					
Athlete	Horse	Event	Qualification Round		Round 1		Round 2		Total	
Athlete	Horse	Event	Penalties	Rank	Penalties	Rank	Penalties	Rank	Penalties	Rank
Luis Ignasio Barreiro; Ruben Russell Rodriguez; Diego Javier Vivero; Pablo Jose Andrade	Silverado; True Love Santa Monica; Neypal Du Plant; Wokina	Team	25.61	9	27.00	9	33.00	10	85.61	10

== Football ==
Ecuador has qualified a men's team in the football competition.

=== Men ===
==== Squad ====
- Juan Carlos Anangonó
- Dixon Arroyo
- Roberto Castro
- Alex Colon
- Luis Congo
- Christian Cruz
- Wilson Folleco
- Edder Fuertes
- John Jaramillo
- Danny Luna
- Deison Mendez
- John Narvaez
- Marco Nazareno
- Johan Padilla
- Carlos Quillupangui
- Dennis Quinonez
- Michael Quiñónez
- Enner Valencia

==== Standings ====
Pos	Team	Pld	W	D	L	GF	GA	GD	Pts	Qualification
1	Mexico	3	2	1	0	8	4	+4	7	Advance to Semifinals
2	Uruguay	3	1	1	1	4	6	−2	4	Advance to Semifinals
3	Trinidad and Tobago	3	0	3	0	3	3	0	3	
4	Ecuador	3	0	1	2	2	4	−2	1	

==== Results ====
October 19, 2011
20:00

Mexico	2 – 1	Ecuador
Peralta 25'; Enríquez 80'	Report	Congo 8'

Estadio Omnilife, Guadalajara
Referee: Marlon Mejía (El Salvador)

October 21, 2011
13:00

Ecuador	0 – 1	Uruguay*
	Report	Puppo 4'

Estadio Omnilife, Guadalajara
Referee: Erick Roberto Andino (Honduras)

October 23, 2011
10:00

Trinidad and Tobago	1 – 1	Ecuador
Casear 69'	Report	Quiñonez 17'

Estadio Omnilife, Guadalajara
Referee: David Gantar (Canada)

- Match was moved to October 25, because of a volcanic eruption spewed ash clouds in Chile which prevented the team from Uruguay to travel to Guadalajara in time.

== Gymnastics ==
=== Artistic ===
Ecuador has qualified two male and two female athletes in the artistic gymnastics competition.

==== Men ====
Individual qualification & Team Finals

Athlete	Event	Apparatus						Qualification		Final	
Athlete	Event	Vault	Floor	Pommel horse	Rings	Parallel bars	Horizontal bar	Total	Rank	Total	Rank
Byron Luis Lopez	Ind Qualification	13.350	11.900	13.200	12.050	11.950	12.150	74.600	27		
Boris Alexander Merchan	Ind Qualification	14.800	13.150	11.200	12.100	11.850	10.600	73.700	28		

Individual Finals

Athlete	Event	Final							
Athlete	Event	Vault	Floor	Pommel horse	Rings	Parallel bars	Horizontal bar	Total	Rank
Boris Alexander Merchan	Individual all-round	15.000	12.700	11.150	11.800	11.200	11.000	72.850	18

==== Women ====
Individual qualification & Team Finals

Athlete	Event	Apparatus				Qualification		Final	
Athlete	Event	Vault	Floor	Balance Beam	Uneven bars	Total	Rank	Total	Rank
Elid Mayerli Helwingg	Ind Qualification	13.000	12.500	11.700	10.300	47.500	36		
Claudia Paola Parra	Ind Qualification	11.975	12.050	9.775	7.975	41.775	42		

Individual Finals

Athlete	Event	Final					
Athlete	Event	Vault	Floor	Uneven bars	Balance beam	Total	Rank
Elid Mayeril Welwigg	Individual all-round	11.975	12.350	NM	NM	24.325	23

== Judo ==
Ecuador has qualified two athletes in the 60 kg and 66 kg men's categories and five athletes in the 48 kg, 57 kg, 70 kg, 78 kg, and 78+kg women's categories.

=== Men ===
Athlete	Event	Round of 16	Quarterfinals	Semifinals	Final
Athlete	Event	Opposition Result	Opposition Result	Opposition Result	Opposition Result
Jose Romero	-60 kg		Aaron Kunishiro (USA); L 001 S3/110 S2	Did not advance (to repechage round)	
Flavio Verdugo	-66 kg		Kenneth Hashimoto (USA); L 000/101 S2	Did not advance (to repechage round)	

Repechage Rounds

Athlete	Event	First Repechage Round	Repechage Quarterfinals	Repechage Semifinals	Bronze Final
Athlete	Event	Opposition Result	Opposition Result	Opposition Result	Opposition Result
Jose Romero	-60 kg			Javier Antonio Guedez (VEN); W 001 S1/000	Juan Postigos (PER); L 001 S4/ 100 S2
Flavio Verdugo	-66 kg	Alejandro Zuñiga (CHI); W 001 /000 S2	Anyelo Gomez (PER); L 001 S2/ 002 S2	Did not advance	

=== Women ===
Athlete	Event	Round of 16	Quarterfinals	Semifinals	Final
Athlete	Event	Opposition Result	Opposition Result	Opposition Result	Opposition Result
Diana Cobos	-48 kg		Dayaris Mestre (CUB); L 000 S1/100	Did not advance (to repechage round)	
Diana Villavicencio	-57 kg		Yadinis Amarís (COL); L 000 S1/100	Did not advance (to repechage round)	
Vanessa Chala	-70 kg		Maria Mazzoleni (BRA); L 000 /100	Did not advance (to repechage round)	
Diana Veronica Chala	-78 kg		Mayra da Silva (BRA); L 000 S1/100	Did not advance (to repechage round)	
Tanya LLamuca	+78 kg		Melissa Mojica (PUR); L 000 S1/100	Did not advance (to repechage round)	

Repechage Rounds

Athlete	Event	First Repechage Round	Repechage Quarterfinals	Repechage Semifinals	Bronze Final
Athlete	Event	Opposition Result	Opposition Result	Opposition Result	Opposition Result
Diana Cobos	-48 kg		Angelo Woosley (USA); L 000 S1/100	Did not advance	
Diana Villavicencio	-57 kg		Joliane Melançon (CAN); L 001 S3/010 S1	Did not advance	
Vanessa Chala	-70 kg		Maria Perez (PUR); L 000 /120	Did not advance	
Tanya Llamuca	+78 kg	Giovanna Blanco (VEN); L 000 S2/111	Did not advance		

== Karate ==
Ecuador has qualified two athletes in the 67 kg and 75 kg men's categories and one athlete in the 55 kg women's category

Athlete	Event	Round robin (Pool A/B)			Semifinals	Final
Athlete	Event	Match 1	Match 2	Match 3	Semifinals	Final
Athlete	Event	Opposition Result	Opposition Result	Opposition Result	Opposition Result	Opposition Result
Daniel Viveros	Men's -67 kg	Delvis Ferrera (DOM); W PTS 2:0	Dennis Novo (CUB); HKW 0:0	Brian Merterl (USA); HKW 1:1	Daniel Carrillo (MEX); WHAN 0:0	Dennis Novo (CUB); W PTS 7:1 (gold)
Esteban Espinoza	Men's -75 kg	Dionisio Gustavo (DOM); L PTS 0:1	Thomas Scott (USA); L PTS 0:1	Aaron Perez (ESA); HKW 0:0	Did not advance	
Jacqueline Factos	Women's -55 kg	Karina Diaz (DOM); HKW 2:2	Valéria Kumizaki (BRA); L PTS 0:4	Yanelsis Gongora (ESA); W PTS 5:1	Did not advance	

== Modern pentathlon ==
Ecuador has qualified two male and one female pentathlete.

Men

Athlete	Event	Fencing (Épée One Touch)			Swimming (200m Freestyle)			Riding (Show Jumping)			Combined			Total Points	Final Rank
Athlete	Event	Results	Rank	MP Points	Time	Rank	MP Points	Penalties	Rank	MP Points	Time	Rank	MP Points	Total Points	Final Rank
Roberto Esteban Arauz	Men's	8V-16D	21	676	2:22.93	20	1088	40	14	1160	13:30.21	19	1760	4684	10
David Eduardo Ruales	Men's	12V-12D	13	820	2:16.03	15	1168	40	15	1160	11:53.96	10	2144	5292	14

Women

Athlete	Event	Fencing (Épée One Touch)			Swimming (200m Freestyle)			Riding (Show Jumping)			Combined			Total Points	Final Rank
Athlete	Event	Results	Rank	MP Points	Time	Rank	MP Points	Penalties	Rank	MP Points	Time	Rank	MP Points	Total Points	Final Rank
Cindy Carolina Merizalde	Women's	4V – 28D	17	496	2:56.07	17	688	DNF			DNS			1184	17

== Racquetball ==
Ecuador has qualified three male and two female athletes in the racquetball competition.

=== Men ===
Athlete	Event	Qualifying Round robin				Round of 32	Round of 16	Quarterfinals	Semifinals	Final	Rank
Athlete	Event	Match 1	Match 2	Match 3	Rank	Opposition Result	Opposition Result	Opposition Result	Opposition Result	Opposition Result	Rank
Fernando Rios	Singles	Ackermann (USA); W 2-0	Mejia (MEX); L 0-2	Cruz (HON); W 2-0	2nd Q		Castro (VEN); W 2-0	Beltrán (MEX); L 0-2	Did not advance		
Jose Ugalde	Singles	Carson III (USA); L 0-2	Monroe (BOL); L 0-2	Camacho (CRC); L 0-2	4th Q	Fumero (CRC); L 1-2	Did not advance				
Fernando Rios; Jose Alvarez	Doubles	Beltrán (MEX); Moreno (MEX); W 2-1	Hirsekorn (VEN); Castro (VEN); W 2-0		3nd Q		Monroy (BOL); Keller (BOL); L 0-2	Did not advance			
Fernando Rios; Jose Alvarez; Jose Ugalde	Team						Dominican Republic; W 2-0	Canada; W 2-1	United States; L 0-2	Did not advance	3rd place, bronze medalist(s)

=== Women ===
Athlete	Event	Qualifying Round robin				Round of 32	Round of 16	Quarterfinals	Semifinals	Final	Rank
Athlete	Event	Match 1	Match 2	Match 3	Rank	Opposition Result	Opposition Result	Opposition Result	Opposition Result	Opposition Result	Rank
María Muñoz	Singles	Muñoz (CHI); W 2-0	Logoria (MEX); L 0-2		2nd Q		Garcia (DOM); W 2-0	Rajsich (USA); L 0-2	Did not advance		
María Córdova	Singles	Rajsich (USA); L 0-2	Grisar (CHI); W 2-1		2nd Q		Salas (MEX); L 0-2	Did not advance			
María Córdova; María Muñoz	Doubles	Rajsich (USA); Ruiz (USA); L 0-2	Paredes (VEN); Tobon (VEN); W 2-0		2nd Q			Loma (BOL); Daza (BOL); W 2-1	Rajsich (USA); Ruiz (USA); L 0-2	Did not advance	3rd place, bronze medalist(s)
María Córdova; María Muñoz	team							Canada; W 2-1	Mexico; L 0-2	Did not advance	3rd place, bronze medalist(s)

== Roller skating ==
Ecuador has qualified a men's team in the roller skating competition.

Men

Athlete	Event	Qualification		Final	
Athlete	Event	Result	Rank	Result	Rank
David Cedeño	300 m time trial			26.526	8
David Cedeño	1,000 m	1:29.193	3rd Q	1:27.367	7
Jorge Bolaños	10,000 m			22	1st place, gold medalist(s)

== Rowing ==
Men

Athlete(s)	Event	Heat		Repechage		Final	
Athlete(s)	Event	Time	Rank	Time	Rank	Time	Rank
Julio Arevalo; Carlos Gómez; Jhon Guala; Bryan Sola	Coxless four (M4-)	6:54.75	4th R	6:56.27	6th QB	6:40.30	2nd B

== Sailing ==
Ecuador has qualified three boats and six athletes in the sailing competition.

Men

Athlete	Event	Race											Net Points	Final Rank
Athlete	Event	1	2	3	4	5	6	7	8	9	10	M	Net Points	Final Rank
Juan Miguel Santos; Juan Andres Santos; Sebastian Herrera	Lighting	5	4	3	7	5	6	1	5	1	5	4	39.0	5
Gaston Vedani; Juan Ferretti	Snipe	3	5	8	7	4	9	8	7	8	9	0	59.0	9

Women

Athlete	Event	Race											Net Points	Final Rank
Athlete	Event	1	2	3	4	5	6	7	8	9	10	M	Net Points	Final Rank
Ariana Villena	Laser Radial	13	12	8	11	2	13	12	13	6	13		90.0	13

== Shooting ==
Ecuador has qualified five shooters (one man and three women).

Men

Event	Athlete	Qualification		Final	
Event	Athlete	Score	Rank	Score	Rank
10 m air pistol	Mario Vinueza	564	17	Did not advance	
50 m pistol	Mario Vinueza	536	12	Did not advance	

Women

Event	Athlete	Qualification		Final	
Event	Athlete	Score	Rank	Score	Rank
10 m air pistol	Jenny Bedoya	372	7th Q	468.0	7
10 m air pistol	Diana Durango	363	19	Did not advance	
10 m air rifle	Sofia Padilla	391	6th Q	489.7	5
25 m pistol	Jenny Bedoya	528-4X	22	Did not advance	
25 m pistol	Diana Durango	562-11X	10	Did not advance	

== Swimming ==
Men

Event	Athletes	Heats		Final	
Event	Athletes	Time	Position	Time	Position
1500 m Freestyle	Esteban Enderica	16:07.78	10	Did not advance	
200 m Individual Medley	Esteban Enderica	2:06.03	6th Q	2:05.10	6
400 m Individual Medley	Esteban Enderica	4:31.15	4th Q	4:26.43	4
10 km Marathon	Ivan Alejandro Enderica			1:57:34.6	4
10 km Marathon	Santiago Paul Enderica			2:03:25.6	10

Women

Athlete	Event	Heats		Final	
Athlete	Event	Time	Rank	Time	Rank
400 m Freestyle	Samantha Arevalo	4:24.81	12	Did not advance	
800 m Freestyle	Samantha Arevalo	5:02.29	8th Q	4:58.27	8
400 m Individual Medley	Samantha Arevalo	4:31.15	4th Q	4:26.43	4
10 km Marathon	Natalia Rosalia Caldas			2:05:57.0	6

== Table tennis ==
Ecuador has qualified three male athletes in the table tennis competition.

Men

Athlete	Event	Round robin			1st round	Eighthfinals	Quarterfinals	Semifinals	Final
Athlete	Event	Match 1	Match 2	Match 3	1st round	Eighthfinals	Quarterfinals	Semifinals	Final
Athlete	Event	Opposition Result	Opposition Result	Opposition Result	Opposition Result	Opposition Result	Opposition Result	Opposition Result	Opposition Result
Geovanny Coello	Singles	Marcelo Aguirre (PAR); L 0 – 4	Juan Acosta (PER); L 2 – 4	Dexter St. Louis (MEX); L 3 – 4	Did not advance				
Alberto Mino	Singles	Timothy Wang (USA); W 4 – 1	Pradeeban Peter (CAN); W 4 – 0	Guillermo Muñoz (MEX); W 4 – 2		Pierre-Luc Thériault (CAN); W 4 – 0	Jorge Campos (CUB); W 4 – 2	Liu Song (ARG); L 1 – 4 (bronze)	Did not advance
Dino Suarez	Singles	Henry Mujica (VEN); L 1 – 4	Alexander Echavarria (COL); L 3 – 4	Gustavo Tsuboi (BRA); L 0 – 4	Did not advance				
Geovanny Coello; Alberto Mino; Dino Suarez	Team	Brazil; L 0 – 3, 1 – 3, 0 – 3	Dominican Republic; L 0 – 3, 3 – 0, 0 – 3, 3 – 2, 0 – 3				Did not advance		

== Taekwondo ==
Ecuador has qualified one athletes in the 68 kg men's categories and one athlete in the 49 kg women's category.

Men

Athlete	Event	Round of 16	Quarterfinals	Semifinals	Final
Athlete	Event	Opposition Result	Opposition Result	Opposition Result	Opposition Result
Sergio Dario Garcia	Lightweight (-68kg)	Mario Andres Guerra (CHI); L 9 – 11	Did not advance		

Women

Athlete	Event	Round of 16	Quarterfinals	Semifinals	Final
Athlete	Event	Opposition Result	Opposition Result	Opposition Result	Opposition Result
Fiama Salazar	Flyweight (-49kg)	Lizbeth Diez Canseco (PER); L 7 – 14	Did not advance		

== Tennis ==
Men

Athlete	Event	1st Round	Round of 32	Round of 16	Quarterfinals	Semifinals	Final
Athlete	Event	Opposition Score	Opposition Score	Opposition Score	Opposition Score	Opposition Score	Opposition Score
Iván Endara	Singles	Luis Martinez (VEN); W 7 – 6(3), 5 – 7, 6 – 4	Ricardo Mello (BRA); L 4 – 6, 0 – 6	Did not advance			
Roberto Quiroz	Singles	Christopher Klingemann (CAN); W 6 – 3, 6 – 3	Guillermo Rivera (CHI); L 5 – 7, 4 – 6	Did not advance			
Julio César Campozano	Singles	José Hernández (DOM); W 6 – 4, 6 – 4	Joao De Souza (BRA); W 7 – 5, 7 – 5	Christopher Díaz Figueroa (GUA); W 7 – 6(5), 4 – 6, 7 – 5	Alejandro González (COL); W 7 – 6(4), 4 – 6, 7 – 5	Rogério Dutra (BRA); L 4 – 6, 7 – 6(5), 5 – 7	Bronze medal match: Víctor Estrella (DOM); L 6 – 3, 5 – 7, 3 – 6
Julio César Campozano; Roberto Quiroz	Doubles			Piero Luisi (VEN); Luis Martinez (VEN); W 6 – 3, 7 – 5	Jose Benitez (PAR); Daniel Alejandro Lopez (PAR); W 6 – 4, 6 – 1	Darian King (BAR); Haydn Lewis (BAR); W 6 – 3, 1 – 6, [12-10]	Juan Sebastián Cabal (COL); Robert Farah Maksoud (COL); L 0 – 6, 4 – 6 (silver)

Women

Athlete	Event	Round of 32	Round of 16	Quarterfinals	Semifinals	Final
Athlete	Event	Opposition Score	Opposition Score	Opposition Score	Opposition Score	Opposition Score
Doménica González	Singles	Jessica Roland (PUR); L 2 – 6, 5 – 7	Did not advance			

Mixed doubles

Athlete	Event	Round of 16	Quarterfinals	Semifinals	Final
Athlete	Event	Opposition Score	Opposition Score	Opposition Score	Opposition Score
Doménica González; Iván Endara	Doubles	Ana Paula de la Peña (MEX); Santiago González (MEX); W 4 – 6, 3 – 6	Did not advance		

== Triathlon ==
=== Men ===
Athlete	Event	Swim (1.5 km)	Trans 1	Bike (40 km)	Trans 2	Run (10 km)	Total	Rank
Paolo Loja	Individual	20:29; 37	0:24; 8	1:04:23; 30	0:15; 11	43:31; 32	2:09:04	32
Juan Andrade	Individual	19:01; 23	0:27; 29	LAP				

=== Women ===
Athlete	Event	Swim (1.5 km)	Trans 1	Bike (40 km)	Trans 2	Run (10 km)	Total	Rank
Elizabeth Bravo	Individual	20:45 =13	0:27; 15	1:03:08; 11	0:17; 12	38:54; 6	2:03:34	7
Diana Vizcarra	Individual	21:50; 24	0:28; 20	LAP				

== Water skiing ==
=== Men ===
Event	Athlete	Semifinal		Final	
Event	Athlete	Points	Rank	Points	Rank
Wakeboard	Jamie Bazan	34.45	3rd q	38.11	6

== Weightlifting ==
Athlete	Event	Snatch			Clean & Jerk			Total	Rank
Athlete	Event	Attempt 1	Attempt 2	Attempt 3	Attempt 1	Attempt 2	Attempt 3	Total	Rank
Enrique Valencia	Men's 69 kg	132	137	~~140~~	~~165~~	~~165~~	165	302	5
Ricardo Hernan Flores	Men's 77 kg	140	145	148	181	~~185~~	~~188~~	329	2nd place, silver medalist(s)
Julio Idrovo	Men's 85 kg	155	~~160~~	~~160~~	170	180	~~185~~	335	4
Eduardo Guadamud	Men's 94 kg	160	165	~~170~~	~~195~~	195	200	365	3rd place, bronze medalist(s)
Jorge Arroyo	Men's 105 kg	175	180	185	200	206	210	395	1st place, gold medalist(s)
Julio Arteaga	Men's +105 kg	165	170	~~173~~	210	220	~~225~~	395	4
Alexandra Andagoya	Women's 53 kg	67	~~70~~	~~70~~	90	~~94~~	~~94~~	161	7
Alexandra Escobar	Women's 58 kg	95	99	~~101~~	120	122	~~126~~	221	1st place, gold medalist(s)
Martha Malla	Women's 63 kg	~~85~~	85	~~90~~	~~110~~	110	~~117~~	195	5
Rosa Tenorio	Women's 69 kg	95	99	~~101~~	115	~~119~~	~~119~~	214	4
Oliba Nieve	Women's +75 kg	107	111	113	137	~~145~~	145	258	1st place, gold medalist(s)

== Wrestling ==
Ecuador has qualified four athletes in the 55 kg, 66 kg, 74 kg, and 120 kg men's freestyle competition, two athletes in the 66 kg and 120 kg men's Greco-Roman competition, and two athletes in the 48 kg and 55 kg women's freestyle competition.

Men

Freestyle

Athlete	Event	Quarterfinals	Semifinals	Final
Athlete	Event	Opposition Result	Opposition Result	Opposition Result
Juan Valverde	55 kg	Fernando Paredes (VEN); W PP 3 – 1	Juan Ramirez Beltre (DOM); L VT 0 – 5	Bronze medal match: Luis Orantes (GUA); W VT 5 – 0 (bronze)
Yoan Blanco	66 kg	Pedro Soto (PUR); L PO 0 – 3	Repechage match: Ghandi Marquez (MEX); W PP 3 – 1	Bronze medal match: Elvis Fuentes (VEN); W PO 3 – 0 (bronze)
Jose Mercado	74 kg	Jordan Burroughs (USA); L ST 0 – 4	Repechage match: Ricardo Roberty (VEN); L PO 3 – 0	Did not advance
Carlos Julio Delgado	120 kg	Tervel Dlagnev (USA); L ST 0 – 4	Repechage match: Disney Rodriguez (CUB); L VT 5 – 0	Did not advance

Greco-Roman

Athlete	Event	Round of 16	Quarterfinals	Semifinals	Final
Athlete	Event	Opposition Result	Opposition Result	Opposition Result	Opposition Result
Vicente Huacon	66 kg	Pedro Mulens (CUB); L PP 1 – 3		Repechage match: Shawn Daye (CAN); W VB 5 – 0	Bronze medal match: Glenn Garrison (USA); L PP 1 – 3
Romel Maza	120 kg		Rafael Barreno (VEN); L PO 0 – 3		Bronze medal match: Victor Alfonso Asprilla (COL); L PO 0 – 3

Women

Freestyle

Athlete	Event	Quarterfinals	Semifinals	Final
Athlete	Event	Opposition Result	Opposition Result	Opposition Result
Luisa Valverde	48 kg	Nesmarie Rodriguez (PUR); W PP 3 – 1	Carol Huynh (CAN); L PO 0 – 3	Bronze medal match: Patricia Bermúdez (ARG); L PP 1 – 3
Lissette Antes	55 kg	Enid Rivera (PUR); W PO 3 – 0	Tonya Verbeek (CAN); L PO 0 – 3	Bronze medal match: Jenny Mallqui (PER); W PP 3 – 1 (bronze)
