= Panamerican Tennis Center =

Sports venue in Zapopan, Jalisco

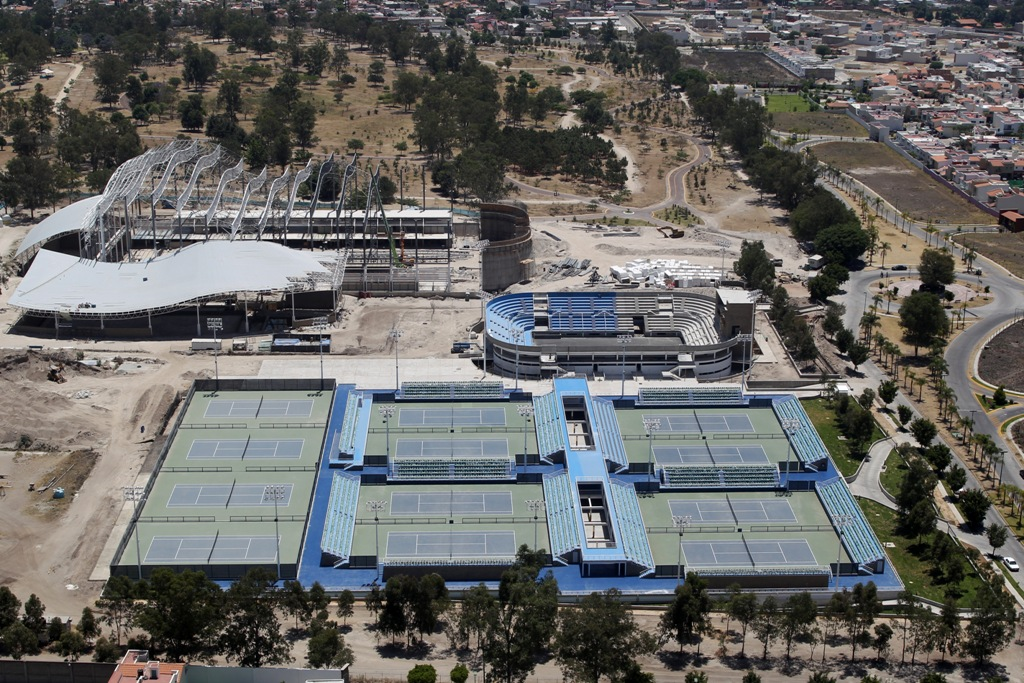
- Panamerican Tennis Center, 2010
- Interactive map of Panamerican Tennis Center
- Location: Zapopan, Guadalajara Metropolitan Area, Mexico
- Capacity: 6,639 seats 2,592 (Main Court)
- Surface: Hard, outdoors

Construction
- Opened: 15 October 2010

Tenants
- 2011 Pan American Games; Abierto Zapopan (2019–)

Panamerican Tennis Center (Spanish: Centro Panamericano de Tenis), formerly The Telcel Tennis Complex, is a tennis center in Zapopan, Jalisco. It was officially opened on 15 October 2010, in a ceremony and exhibition tournament featuring tennis professionals Andre Agassi and Jim Courier. The complex consists of a main court with a capacity of 2,592, 8 tournament courts, 4 practice courts and an underground parking lot. It hosted the tennis competition at the 2011 Pan American Games. For the games it had a temporary capacity of 6,639 for the entire complex.

It was sponsored by the Mexican communications company Telcel.

The Panamerican Tennis Center is hosting the Abierto Zapopan, a tennis tournament part of the WTA 250, from 2019 to 2022, and part of the WTA 125 from 2024. It is also the home of the Guadalajara Open, the first tournament of its kind in Latin America. The centre also became the first Latin American venue to host the WTA Finals when the city was awarded the hosting rights in 2021 just two months prior to organizing the actual event. It also used to host the ATP challenger tournament, Jalisco Open until 2018.

== See also ==
- Tennis at the 2011 Pan American Games
