= Peru at the 2011 Pan American Games =

- IOC code: PER
- NOC: Comité Olímpico Peruano
- Website: www.coperu.org

in Guadalajara 14–30 October 2011
- Competitors: 139 in 22 sports
- Flag bearer: Jenny Mallqui
- Medals Ranked 20th: Gold 0 Silver 2 Bronze 5 Total 7

Pan American Games appearances (overview)
- 1951; 1955; 1959; 1963; 1967; 1971; 1975; 1979; 1983; 1987; 1991; 1995; 1999; 2003; 2007; 2011; 2015; 2019; 2023

Peru competed at the 2011 Pan American Games in Guadalajara, Mexico from October 14 to 30, 2011, sending 139 athletes in 22 sports.

== Medalists ==
Medal	Name	Sport	Event	Date
Silver	Lizbeth Diez-Canseco	Taekwondo	Women's 49kg	October 15
Silver	Alexandra Grande	Karate	Women's 61 kg	October 29
Bronze	Claudia Rivero	Badminton	Women's singles	October 18
Bronze	Claudia Rivero; Rodrigo Pacheco	Badminton	Mixed doubles	October 18
Bronze	Gladys Tejeda	Athletics	Women's Marathon	October 23
Bronze	Inés Melchor	Athletics	Women's 5,000 metres	October 27
Bronze	Juan Postigos	Judo	Men's 60 kg	October 29

== Athletics ==
=== Men ===
Track and road events

Event	Athletes	Heats		Semifinal		Final	
Event	Athletes	Time	Rank	Time	Rank	Time	Rank
5000 m	Jhon Cusi					14:28.31	9th
5000 m	Raul Cesar Machahuay					14:43.05	15th
10000 m	Jhon Cusi					DNF	
10000 m	Raul Cesar Machahuay					30:55.05	7th
110 m hurdles	Javier Arturo McFarlane			14.30	8th	did not advance	
110 m hurdles	Jorge Armando McFarlane			13.72 PB	5th	did not advance	
3000 m steeplechase	Mario Bazán					8:56.31	7th
Marathon	Constantino León					2:21:18	7th
Marathon	Raul Manuel Pacheco					2:27:39	12th

Field events

Event	Athletes	Semifinal		Final	
Event	Athletes	Result	Rank	Result	Rank
High jump	Arturo Chavez			2.10 m.	12th
Long jump	Jorge Armando McFarlane	7.83 m.	3rd Q	7.78 m.	5th
Shot put	Michael Kevin Putman			17.74 m.	10th

=== Women ===
Track and road events

Event	Athletes	Semifinal		Final	
Event	Athletes	Time	Rank	Time	Rank
5000 m	Wilma Yanet Arizapana			17:06.99	9th
5000 m	Ines Melchor			16:41.50	3rd place, bronze medalist(s)
10000 m	Hortencia Arzapalo			37:10.63	8th
10000 m	Julia Rivera			35:46.21	6th
100 m hurdles	Giuliana Maria Franciosi	14.67	7th	did not advance	
3000 m steeplechase	Yony Ninahuanan			11:00.30	7th
Marathon	Jemena Helen Misayauri			3:06:40	13th
Marathon	Gladys Tejeda			2:42:09	3rd place, bronze medalist(s)
20 km walk	Farilus Eliana Morales			1:45:38	12th

Field events

Event	Athletes	Semifinal		Final	
Event	Athletes	Result	Rank	Result	Rank
High jump	Gabriela Ana Saravia			1.65 m.	9th
Pole vault	Maria Isabel Ferrand			3.55 m.	13th
Pole vault	Jessica Daiana Fu			3.55 m.	14th

== Badminton ==
Peru has qualified four male and four female athletes in the badminton competition.

Men

Athlete	Event	Round of 32	Round of 16	Quarterfinals	Semifinals	Final
Athlete	Event	Opposition Score	Opposition Score	Opposition Score	Opposition Score	Opposition Score
Mario Cuba	Singles	Job Castillo (MEX); W 21–18, 22–20	Kevin Cordón (GUA); L 15–21, 21–23	did not advance		
Rodrigo Pacheco	Singles	Andrés López (MEX); W 21–12, 22–20	Charles Pyne (JAM); L 22-21 17–21, 10–21	did not advance		
Martín del Valle	Singles	Lino Muñoz (MEX); L 10–21, 3–21	did not advance			
Antonio de Vinatea; Martín del Valle	Doubles		Halim Ho (United States) Sattawat Pongnairat (USA); L 17–21, 15–21	did not advance		

Women

Athlete	Event	Round of 32	Round of 16	Quarterfinals	Semifinals	Final
Athlete	Event	Opposition Score	Opposition Score	Opposition Score	Opposition Score	Opposition Score
Claudia Rivero	Singles	Shari Watson (BAR); W 21–8, 21–8	Nikté Sotomayor (GUA); W 21–6, 21–1	Rena Wang (USA); W 21–15, 21–19	Joycelyn Ko (CAN); L 9–21, 21–17, 10–21 (bronze)	Did not advance
Christina Aicardi	Singles	Natalia Villegas (CHI); W 21–19, 22–9	María L. Hernández (CUB); W 21–15, 11–21, 21–19	Victoria Montero (MEX); L 15–21, 10–21	did not advance	
Alejandra Monteverde	Singles	Rujshaar Ishaak (SUR); W 21–11, 21–9	Lohaynny Vicente (BRA); L 18–21, 18–21	did not advance		
Claudia Rivero; Christina Aicardi	Doubles	María L. Hernández (Cuba) Chaviano Mislenis (CUB); W 26–24, 21–16	Ana Lucia de León (Guatemala) Maria del Valle (GUA); W 21–10, 21–7	Eva Lee (United States) Paula Lynn Obañana (USA); L 6–21, 11–21	did not advance	
Lorena Duany; Alejandra Monteverde	Doubles	Marina Eliezer (Brazil) Fabiana Silva (BRA); W 21–10, 21–10	Daniela Araujo (Venezuela) Lady Tovar (VEN); W 21–13, 21–4	Grace Gao (Canada) Joycelyn Ko (CAN); L 11–21, 17–21	did not advance	

Mixed

Athlete	Event	Round of 32	Round of 16	Quarterfinals	Semifinals	Final
Athlete	Event	Opposition Score	Opposition Score	Opposition Score	Opposition Score	Opposition Score
Rodrigo Pacheco; Claudia Rivero	Mixed		Andrés López (Mexico) Victoria Montero (MEX); W 21–17, 21–11	Heymard Humblers (Guatemala) Nikté Sotomayor (GUA); W 21–10, 21–13	Halim Ho (United States) Eva Lee (USA); L 13–21, 19–21 (bronze)	Did not advance
Mario Cuba; Lorena Duany	Mixed	Daniel Paiola (Brazil) Fabiana Silva (BRA); W 21–14, 21–19	Toby Ng (Canada) Grace Gao (CAN); L 9–21, 11–21	did not advance		

== Basque pelota ==
=== Men ===
Athlete(s)	Event	Series 1	Series 2	Series 3	Series 4	Bronze Medal	Final
Athlete(s)	Event	Opposition Score	Opposition Score	Opposition Score	Opposition Score	Opposition Score	Opposition Score
Leonardo Lucas Benique; Cristopher Kevin Martinez	Paleta Rubber Pairs 30m Fronton	Raul Camesaña (URU); Fausto Alejandro Lancelotti (URU); L 1-12,2-12	Jesus Homero Hurtado (MEX); Daniel Salvador Rodriguez (MEX); L 2-12, 2-12	Eduardo Casellas (VEN); Jaime Vera (VEN); L 4-12, 5-12	Jose Noel Fiffe (CUB); Jhoan Luis Torreblanca (CUB); L 2-12, 3-12	did not advance	

== Bowling ==
Peru has qualified two male and two female athletes in the bowling competition.

=== Men ===
Individual

Athlete	Event	Qualification															Eighth Finals	Quarterfinals	Semifinals	Finals	
Athlete	Event	Block 1 (Games 1–6)						Block 2 (Games 7–12)						Total	Average	Rank	Eighth Finals	Quarterfinals	Semifinals	Finals	
Athlete	Event	1	2	3	4	5	6	7	8	9	10	11	12	Total	Average	Rank	Opposition Scores	Opposition Scores	Opposition Scores	Opposition Scores	Rank
Victor Ricardo Tateishi	Men's individual	177	228	203	176	175	235	164	194	212	182	245	145	2336	194.7	22nd	did not advance				
Adolfo Edgardo Vargas	Men's individual	211	202	196	170	210	214	205	174	181	221	174	179	2337	194.8	20th	did not advance				

Pairs

Athlete	Event	Block 1 (Games 1–6)								Block 2 (Games 7–12)								Grand Total	Final Rank
Athlete	Event	1	2	3	4	5	6	Total	Average	7	8	9	10	11	12	Total	Average	Grand Total	Final Rank
Victor Ricardo Tateishi; Adolfo Edgardo Vargas	Men's pairs	197	179	169	194	192	172	1103	183.8	155	203	168	181	178	226	2214	184.5	4358	14th
Victor Ricardo Tateishi; Adolfo Edgardo Vargas	Men's pairs	202	181	207	206	162	194	1152	192.0	156	179	179	154	176	148	2144	178.7	4358	14th

=== Women ===
Individual

Athlete	Event	Qualification															Eighth Finals	Quarterfinals	Semifinals	Finals	
Athlete	Event	Block 1 (Games 1–6)						Block 2 (Games 7–12)						Total	Average	Rank	Eighth Finals	Quarterfinals	Semifinals	Finals	
Athlete	Event	1	2	3	4	5	6	7	8	9	10	11	12	Total	Average	Rank	Opposition Scores	Opposition Scores	Opposition Scores	Opposition Scores	Rank
Connie Seragaki	Women's individual	174	155	190	146	185	181	168	201	179	181	178	156	2094	174.5	25th	did not advance				
Veronica Delgado	Women's individual	159	190	167	160	144	166	172	153	163	141	138	144	1897	158.1	30th	did not advance				

Pairs

Athlete	Event	Block 1 (Games 1–6)								Block 2 (Games 7–12)								Grand Total	Final Rank
Athlete	Event	1	2	3	4	5	6	Total	Average	7	8	9	10	11	12	Total	Average	Grand Total	Final Rank
Veronica Delgado; Connie Seragaki	Women's pairs	167	150	183	178	140	174	992	165.3	161	189	160	188	185	237	2112	176.0	4180	13th
Veronica Delgado; Connie Seragaki	Women's pairs	115	179	194	157	181	176	1002	167.0	160	193	212	159	178	164	2068	172.3	4180	13th

== Boxing ==
=== Men ===
Athlete	Event	Preliminaries	Quarterfinals	Semifinals	Final
Athlete	Event	Opposition Result	Opposition Result	Opposition Result	Opposition Result
Luis Ángel Miranda	Welterweight		Mian-Imtiaz Hussain (CAN); L 8 – 21	did not advance	

== Equestrian ==
=== Jumping ===
Individual jumping

Athlete	Horse	Event	Ind. 1st Qualifier		Ind. 2nd Qualifier			Ind. 3rd Qualifier			Ind. Final					
Athlete	Horse	Event	Ind. 1st Qualifier		Ind. 2nd Qualifier			Ind. 3rd Qualifier			Round A		Round B		Total	
Athlete	Horse	Event	Penalties	Rank	Penalties	Total	Rank	Penalties	Total	Rank	Penalties	Rank	Penalties	Rank	Penalties	Rank
María Paz Gastañeta	Gabriel	Individual	12.32	45th	8.00	20.32	27th	4.00	24.32	18th	did not advance					
Michelle Maria Navarro Grau	Tibetano	Individual	11.13	42nd	20.00	31.13	47th	8.00	39.13	34th	did not advance					
Jenefer Anne Teague	Tlalpi L.S.	Individual	15.70	52nd	14.00	29.70	44th	did not advance								
Alonso Napoleon Valdez	United III	Individual	38.80	54th	DNS			did not advance								

=== Team jumping ===
Athlete	Horse	Event	Qualification Round		Final					
Athlete	Horse	Event	Qualification Round		Round 1		Round 2		Total	
Athlete	Horse	Event	Penalties	Rank	Penalties	Rank	Penalties	Rank	Penalties	Rank
María Paz Gastañeta; Michelle Maria Navarro Grau; Jenefer Anne Teague; Alonso Napoleon Valdez	Gabriel; Tibetano; Tlalpi L.S. United III	Team	39.15	12th	42.00	12th	did not advance			

== Gymnastics ==
=== Artistic ===
Peru has qualified two male and one female athletes in the artistic gymnastics competition.

Men
Individual qualification & Team Finals

Athlete	Event	Apparatus						Qualification	
Athlete	Event	Floor	Pommel horse	Rings	Vault	Parallel bars	Horizontal bar	Total	Rank
Mario Paulo Berrios	Ind Qualification	12.150			14.450	12.450	11.850	50.900	46th
Jose Carlos Quilla	Ind Qualification	11.850	10.700	11.800	13.250	11.600	11.600	70.800	32nd

Individual Finals

Athlete	Event	Final							
Athlete	Event	Floor	Pommel horse	Rings	Vault	Parallel bars	Horizontal bar	Total	Rank
Jose Carlos Quilla	Individual All-around	12.800	9.500	11.500	14.400	11.850	11.650	71.700	20th

Women
Individual qualification & Team Finals

Athlete	Event	Apparatus				Qualification	
Athlete	Event	Vault	Uneven bars	Balance Beam	Floor	Total	Rank
Sandra Mary Collantes	Ind Qualification	13.625	10.375	11.800	12.825	48.625	34th

Individual Finals

Athlete	Event	Apparatus				Final	
Athlete	Event	Vault	Uneven bars	Balance Beam	Floor	Total	Rank
Sandra Mary Collantes	Individual All-around		9.625			9.625	24th

== Judo ==
Peru has qualified four athletes in the 60 kg, 66 kg, 81 kg, and 100+kg men's categories and two athletes in the 48 kg and 52 kg women's categories.

Men

Athlete	Event	Round of 16	Quarterfinals	Semifinals	Final
Athlete	Event	Opposition Result	Opposition Result	Opposition Result	Opposition Result
Juan Postigos	−60 kg		Kenny Godoy (HON); W 100 – 000 S4	Nabor Castillo (MEX); L 000 S1 – 001	did not advance (to repechage round)
Humberto Alonso Wong	−66 kg	Sasha Mehmedovic (CAN); L 001 S2 – 002	did not advance		
German Velazco	−81 kg		Leandro Guilheiro (BRA); L 000 S4 – 101	did not advance (to repechage round)	
Carlos Erick Zegarra	+100 kg		Luis Ignasio Salazar (COL); L 000 S2 – 001 S1	did not advance (to repechage round)	

Repechage Rounds

Athlete	Event	Repechage 8	Repechage Final	Bronze Final
Athlete	Event	Opposition Result	Opposition Result	Opposition Result
Juan Postigos	−60 kg			Jose Ernesto Romero (ECU); W 100 S2 – 001 S4 (bronze)
German Velazco	−81 kg	Luis Retamales (CHI); W 100 – 000	Emmanuel Lucenti (ARG); L 000 – 100 S1	did not advance
Carlos Erick Zegarra	+100 kg	Darrel Akim Castillo (GUA); W 100 – 000 S1	Pablo figueroa (PUR); L 000 S3 – 010 S1	did not advance

Women

Athlete	Event	Round of 16	Quarterfinals	Semifinals	Final
Athlete	Event	Opposition Result	Opposition Result	Opposition Result	Opposition Result
Lesly Carolyn Cano	−48 kg	Paula Pareto (ARG); L 000 – 110	did not advance (to repechage round)		
Lesley Angela Huaman	−52 kg		Yanet Bermoy (CUB); L 000 S1 – 101	did not advance (to repechage round)	

Repechage Rounds

Athlete	Event	Repechage 8	Repechage Final	Bronze Final
Athlete	Event	Opposition Result	Opposition Result	Opposition Result
Lesly Carolyn Cano	−48 kg	Luz Adiela Alvarez (COL); L 000 S3 – 120 S1	did not advance	
Lesley Angela Huaman	−52 kg		Yulieth Sánchez (COL); L Fusen-Gachi	did not advance

== Karate ==
Peru has qualified four athletes in the 60 kg, 67 kg, 75 kg and 84 kg men's categories and one athlete in the 61 kg women's category.

Athlete	Event	Round robin (Pool A/B)			Semifinals	Final
Athlete	Event	Match 1	Match 2	Match 3	Semifinals	Final
Athlete	Event	Opposition Result	Opposition Result	Opposition Result	Opposition Result	Opposition Result
Dennis Lazo	Men's -60 kg	Manual Araujo (MEX); HWK 0:0	Douglas Brouse (BRA); L PTS 0:1	Norberto Sosa (DOM); L PTS 0:5	did not advance	
Jesus Paucarcaja	Men's -67 kg	Carlos Galan (ESA); HWK 0:0	Jean Carlos Peña (VEN); L PTS 0:4	Daniel Carrillo (MEX); L PTS 1:4	did not advance	
Israel Aco	Men's -75 kg	Lester Zamora (CUB); L PTS 1:2	Antonio Gutierrez (MEX); W PTS 1:0	David Dubo (CHI); L PTS 0:2	did not advance	
Edwin Assereto	Men's -84 kg	Cesar Herrera (VEN); HWK 0:0	Jorge Perez (DOM); L PTS 1:3	Jose Hector Paz (ESA); W PTS 1:0	did not advance	
Alexandra Grande	Women's -61 kg	Daniela Suarez (VEN); HWK 2:2	Yaremi Borzelli (PAN); HWK 0:0	Golrokh Khalili (CAN); W PTS 9:0	Marisca Verspaget (AHO); W PTS 2:0	Bertha Gutierrez (MEX); L PTS 0:2 (silver)

== Rowing ==
Men

Athlete(s)	Event	Heat		Repechage		Final	
Athlete(s)	Event	Time	Rank	Time	Rank	Time	Rank
Victor Aspillaga	Single sculls (M1×)	7:30.30	3rd R	7:29.91	3rd qB	7:17.59	2nd B
Niko Kissic; Renzo Leon	Lightweight double sculls (LM2×)	7:01.12	4th R	6:51.05	3rd qB	6:47.82	2nd B
Manuel Lama; Diego Mejía	Coxless pair (M2-)	7:46.49	4th R	7:21.83	4th qB	7:20.00	2nd B

Women

Athlete(s)	Event	Heat		Repechage		Final	
Athlete(s)	Event	Time	Rank	Time	Rank	Time	Rank
Claudia Caballero	Lightweight single sculls (LW1×)	9:41.20	4th R	8:35.37	6th qB	8:26.80	2nd B

== Sailing ==
Peru has qualified four boats and seven athletes in the sailing competition.

Men

Athlete	Event	Race											Net Points	Final Rank
Athlete	Event	1	2	3	4	5	6	7	8	9	10	M	Net Points	Final Rank
Matias Canseco	Windsurfer (RS:X)	(10)	10	10	10	9	10	10	9	7	8	/	83.0	10th

Women

Athlete	Event	Race											Net Points	Final Rank
Athlete	Event	1	2	3	4	5	6	7	8	9	10	M	Net Points	Final Rank
Paloma Isabel Schmidt	Single-handed Dinghy (Laser Radial)	9	(13)	10	8	6	4	4	12	4	9	/	66.0	7th

Open

Athlete	Event	Race											Net Points	Final Rank
Athlete	Event	1	2	3	4	5	6	7	8	9	10	M	Net Points	Final Rank
Ignacio Roberto Arrospide; Luis Alberto Olcese; Joel Raffo; Christian Rene Sas	Keelboat (J/24)	3	4	3	5	(6)	4	4	1	5	5	4	38.0	4th
Alexander Zimmermann	Single-handed Dinghy (Sunfish)	3	5	9	(10)	6	7	5	5	2	3	8	53.0	4th

== Shooting ==
Men

Event	Athlete	Qualification		Final	
Event	Athlete	Score	Rank	Score	Rank
10 m air pistol	Enrique Luis Arnaez	552-12x	27th	did not advance	
10 m air pistol	Alejandro Antonio Garcia Miro	559-13x	21st	did not advance	
10 m air rifle	Miguel Alonso Mejia	567-27x	23rd	did not advance	
10 m air rifle	Cesar Renato Yui	578-31x	18th	did not advance	
25 m rapid fire pistol	Pedro Manuel Jose Garcia Miro	514- 8x	13th	did not advance	
50 m pistol	Enrique Luis Arnaez	534- 5x	15th	did not advance	
50 m pistol	Martin Ivan Galvez	527- 2x	21st	did not advance	
50 m rifle prone	Guido Eliseo Farfan	578-24x	17th	did not advance	
50 m rifle prone	Daniel Eduardo Vizcarra	527-19x	27th	did not advance	
50 m rifle three positions	Guido Eliseo Farfan	1092- 31x	21st	did not advance	
50 m rifle three positions	Cesar Renato Yui	1118- 26x	19th	did not advance	
Trap	Asier Josu Cilloniz	117	9th	did not advance	
Trap	Alvaro Enrique Rodriguez	106	25th	did not advance	
Double Trap	Asier Josu Cilloniz	119	5th	did not advance	
Skeet	Nicolas Elias Giha	113	18th	did not advance	
Skeet	Marco Rodolfo Matellini	114	16th	did not advance	

Women

Event	Athlete	Qualification		Final	
Event	Athlete	Score	Rank	Score	Rank
10 m air pistol	Diana Aurora Osorio	364- 7x	18th	did not advance	
10 m air pistol	Miriam Mariana Quintanilla	348- 4x	25th	did not advance	
10 m air rifle	Karina Paola Rodriguez	383-18x	21st	did not advance	
10 m air rifle	Sara Gabriela Vizcarra	384-17x	18th	did not advance	
25 m pistol	Diana Aurora Osorio	560-10x	13th	did not advance	
25 m pistol	Miriam Mariana Quintanilla	550-10x	17th	did not advance	
50 m rifle three positions	Karina Paola Rodriguez	559-18x	18th	did not advance	
50 m rifle three positions	Sara Gabriela Vizcarra	539- 7x	23rd	did not advance	

== Squash ==
Peru has qualified three male athletes in the squash competition

Men

Athlete	Event	Round of 32	Round of 16	Quarterfinals	Semifinals	Final
Athlete	Event	Opposition Score	Opposition Score	Opposition Score	Opposition Score	Opposition Score
Andrés Duany	Singles	Byron Garcia (ESA); L 3-11, 2-11, 10-12	did not advance			
Alonso Escudero	Singles	Hernán D'Arcangelo (ARG); L 11-13, 4-11, 3-11	did not advance			
Andrés Duany; Diego Elías	Doubles		Esteban Casarino (PAR); Nicolas Caballero (PAR); L WO 0-11, 0-11	did not advance		

Athletes	Event	Preliminaries Group Stage			Quarterfinal	Semifinal	Final	Rank
Athletes	Event	Opposition Result	Opposition Result	Opposition Result	Opposition Result	Opposition Result	Opposition Result	Rank
Andrés Duany; Diego Elías; Alonso Escudero	Team	Argentina; L 3-0, 0-3, 1-3	Brazil; L 0-3, 0-3, 0-3	Paraguay; L 3-0, 0-3, 2-3	did not advance			

== Swimming ==
Men

Event	Athletes	Heats		Final	
Event	Athletes	Time	Position	Time	Position
200 m Freestyle	Sebastian Jahnsen	1:55.10	17th qB	1:55.26	8th B
400 m Freestyle	Sebastian Jahnsen	4:13.73	13th qB	4:05.56	5th B
1500 m Freestyle	Sebastian Jahnsen	16:16.90	12th	did not advance	
200 m Backstroke	Mauricio Rafael Fiol	2:11.75	11th	did not advance	
100 m Breaststroke	Gerardo Huidobro	1:05.62	16th qB	1:05.68	8th B
200 m Breaststroke	Gerardo Huidobro	2:27.78	15th qB	2:23.51	3rd B
100 m Butterfly	Mauricio Rafael Fiol	54.56	10th qB	54.26	2nd B
200 m Butterfly	Mauricio Rafael Fiol	2:01.91	8th Q	2:03.36	8th
200 m Individual Medley	Sebastian Jahnsen	2:26.70	15th	did not advance	
4 × 100 m Freestyle Relay	Sebastian Jahnsen; Mauricio Rafael Fiol; Jesus Augusto Monge; Gerardo Huidobro	3:39.17	7th Q	3:47.55	8th
4 × 200 m Freestyle Relay	Sebastian Jahnsen; Mauricio Rafael Fiol; Jesus Augusto Monge; Gerardo Huidobro	7:51.08	5th Q	DSQ	
4 × 100 m Medley Relay	Sebastian Jahnsen; Mauricio Rafael Fiol; Jesus Augusto Monge; Gerardo Huidobro	3:57.42	9th	did not advance	

Women

Event	Athletes	Heats		Final	
Event	Athletes	Time	Position	Time	Position
200 m Freestyle	Andrea Cedron	2:08.36	11th qB	2:06.81	4th B
400 m Freestyle	Andrea Cedrón	4:33.75	16th qB	4:26.76	5th B
800 m Freestyle	Daniela Kaori Miyahara	9:21.64	14th	did not advance	
100 m butterfly	Oriele Espinoza	1:06.16	20th	did not advance	
200 m butterfly	Oriele Espinoza	DNS		did not advance	
200 m Individual Medley	Maria Alejandra Torres	2:30.53	17th	did not advance	
400 m Individual Medley	Maria Alejandra Torres	5:27.30	21st	did not advance	
400 m Individual Medley	Patricia Quevedo	5:13.30	13th qB	5:20.50	7th B
4 × 100 m Freestyle Relay	Andrea Cedrón; Oriele Espinoza; Daniela Kaori Miyahara; Mariangela Macchiavello	4:04.88	8th Q	4:00.64	8th
4 × 200 m Freestyle Relay	Andrea Cedrón; Daniela Kaori Miyahara; Maria Alejandra Torres; Mariangela Macchiavello; Patricia Quevedo	8:51.52	6th Q	8:42.24	7th
4 × 100 m Medley Relay	Andrea Cedrón; Daniela Kaori Miyahara; Mariangela Macchiavello; Patricia Quevedo	4:39.27	9th	did not advance	

== Table tennis ==
Peru has qualified one male and three female athletes in the table tennis competition.

Men

Athlete	Event	Round robin			1st round	Eighthfinals	Quarterfinals	Semifinals	Final
Athlete	Event	Match 1	Match 2	Match 3	1st round	Eighthfinals	Quarterfinals	Semifinals	Final
Athlete	Event	Opposition Result	Opposition Result	Opposition Result	Opposition Result	Opposition Result	Opposition Result	Opposition Result	Opposition Result
Juan Acosta	Singles	Dexter St. Louis (TRI); L 3 – 4	Geovanny Coello (COL); W 4 – 2	Marcelo Aguirre (PAR); L 3 – 4	did not advance				

Women

Athlete	Event	Round robin			1st round	Eighthfinals	Quarterfinals	Semifinals	Final
Athlete	Event	Match 1	Match 2	Match 3	1st round	Eighthfinals	Quarterfinals	Semifinals	Final
Athlete	Event	Opposition Result	Opposition Result	Opposition Result	Opposition Result	Opposition Result	Opposition Result	Opposition Result	Opposition Result
Angela Mori	Singles	Fabiola Ramos (VEN); L 0 – 4	Judith Morales (CHI); W 4 – 3	Johana Araque (COL); L 0 – 4	did not advance				
Maria Soto	Singles	Zhang Mo (CAN); L 1 – 4	Monica Serrano (MEX); W 4 – 1	Glendys Gonzalez (CUB); L 0 – 4	did not advance				
Francesca Vargas	Singles	Lisi Castillo (CUB); W 4 – 1	Karla Perez (ESA); W 4 – 0	Lily Zhang (USA); L 1 – 4	Jessica Yamada (BRA); L 1 – 4	did not advance			
Angela Mori; Maria Soto; Francesca Vargas	Team	United States; L 1 – 3, 1 – 3, 1 – 3	Dominican Republic; L 1 – 3, 1 – 3, 3 – 2, 0 – 3				did not advance		

== Taekwondo ==
Peru has qualified two female athletes in the 49 kg and 57 kg categories and one male athlete in the 68 kg category.

Men

Athlete	Event	Round of 16	Quarterfinals	Semifinals	Final
Athlete	Event	Opposition Result	Opposition Result	Opposition Result	Opposition Result
Peter López	Lightweight (-68kg)	Leandro Garcia (ARG); W 4 – 3	Angel Mora (CUB); L 4 – 5 SDP	did not advance	

Women

Athlete	Event	Round of 16	Quarterfinals	Semifinals	Final
Athlete	Event	Opposition Result	Opposition Result	Opposition Result	Opposition Result
Lizbeth Diez-Canseco	Flyweight (-49kg)	Fiama Salazar (ECU); W 14 – 7	Monica Olarte (COL); W 11 – 6	Jannet Alegria (MEX); W SDP 15 – 14	Ivett Gonda (CAN); L 6 – 13 (silver)
Elizabeth Geisha Alvarado	Lightweight (-57kg)	Yeni Contreras (CHI); L 4 – 10	did not advance		

== Tennis ==
Peru had qualified three female athletes and three male athletes.

Men

Athlete	Event	1st round	Round of 32	Round of 16	Quarterfinals	Semifinals	Final
Athlete	Event	Opposition Score	Opposition Score	Opposition Score	Opposition Score	Opposition Score	Opposition Score
Iván Miranda	Singles	Piero Luisi (VEN); W 6–2, 6–7^{(5–7)}, 2–0 ret.	Horacio Zeballos (ARG); W 6–3, 6–4	Jorge Aguilar (CHI); L 3–6, 6–4, 3–6	did not advance		
Mauricio Echazú	Singles	Marvin Rolle (BAH); L 3–6, 4–6	did not advance				
Mauricio Echazú; Iván Miranda	Doubles			Nicholas Monroe (USA); Greg Ouellette (USA); L 3–6, 4–6	did not advance		

Women

Athlete	Event	1st round	Round of 32	Round of 16	Quarterfinals	Semifinals	Final
Athlete	Event	Opposition Score	Opposition Score	Opposition Score	Opposition Score	Opposition Score	Opposition Score
Patricia Kú Flores	Singles		Andrea Koch Benvenuto (CHI); L 1–6, 0–6	did not advance			
Ximena Siles-Luna	Singles		Daniela Seguel (CHI); L 2–6, 6–4, 6–7^{(1–7)}	did not advance			
Patricia Kú Flores; Ximena Siles-Luna	Doubles				Irina Falconi (USA); Christina McHale (USA); L 0–6, 0–6	did not advance	

Mixed

Athlete	Event	1st round	Quarterfinals	Semifinals	Final
Athlete	Event	Opposition Score	Opposition Score	Opposition Score	Opposition Score
Bianca Botto; Duilio Beretta	Mixed doubles	Monica Puig (PUR); Alexander Llompart (PUR); W 7–5, 5–7, [10–7]	Ana Clara Duarte (BRA); Rogério Dutra (BRA); L 3–6, 4–6	did not advance	

== Triathlon ==
Men

Athlete	Event	Swim (1.5 km)	Trans 1	Bike (40 km)	Trans 2	Run (10 km)	Total	Rank
Dereck Mori	Individual	19:32; 34th	0:24; 10th	LAP				

== Volleyball ==
Peru qualified for the women's tournament. The team will be made up of 12 athletes.

Women

Team

- 1 Angélica Aquino
- 2 Mirtha Uribe
- 4 Patricia Soto (c)
- 5 Vanessa Palacios (L)
- 6 Jessenia Uceda
- 7 Yulissa Zamudio
- 10 Luren Baylon
- 11 Clarivett Yllescas
- 12 Carla Rueda
- 14 Elena Keldibekova
- 15 Karla Ortiz
- 16 Alexandra Muñoz

Group B

Pos	Team	Pld	W	L	Pts	SPW	SPL	SPR	SW	SL	SR	Qualification
1	United States	3	3	0	15	231	161	1.435	9	0	MAX	Semifinals
2	Puerto Rico	3	2	1	8	245	231	1.061	6	5	1.200	Quarterfinals
3	Peru	3	1	2	5	225	262	0.859	4	7	0.571	Quarterfinals
4	Mexico	3	0	3	2	224	271	0.827	2	9	0.222	

Date		Score		Set 1	Set 2	Set 3	Set 4	Set 5	Total	Report
Oct 15	Mexico	1–3	Peru	25–27	25–16	19–25	19–25		88–93	Report
Oct 16	United States	3–0	Peru	25–19	25–15	25–19			75–53	Report
Oct 17	Peru	1–3	Puerto Rico	26–24	21–25	21–25	11–25		79–99	Report

Quarterfinals

Date		Score		Set 1	Set 2	Set 3	Set 4	Set 5	Total	Report
Oct 18	Cuba	3–0	Peru	25–18	25–19	26–24			76–61	Report

Fifth to eighth place classification

Date		Score		Set 1	Set 2	Set 3	Set 4	Set 5	Total	Report
Oct 19	Peru	3–1	Canada	26–24	18–25	25–22	25–19		94–90	Report

Fifth place match

Date		Score		Set 1	Set 2	Set 3	Set 4	Set 5	Total	Report
Oct 20	Peru	0–3	Puerto Rico	23–25	20–25	19–25			62–75	Report

2011 Pan American Games 6th

Peru

== Water skiing ==
Peru has qualified two male and three female athletes in the water skiing competition.

Men

Event	Athlete	Semifinal		Final	
Event	Athlete	Points	Rank	Points	Rank
Slalom	Mario Andres Mustafa	23.00	15th	did not advance	
Jump	Mario Andres Mustafa	50.40	9th	did not advance	
Wakeboard	Sebastian Harmsen	20.00	4th q	22.89	7th

Women

Athlete	Event	Semifinal		Final	
Athlete	Event	Points	Rank	Points	Rank
Tricks	Maria Delfina Cuglievan	DNS		did not advance	
Tricks	Natalia Josefina Cuglievan	5960	4th q	6090	4th
Slalom	Maria Delfina Cuglievan	25.50	4th q	28.50	4th
Slalom	Ivanna Cuglievan	17.00	10th	did not advance	
Jump	Maria Delfina Cuglievan	41.30	3rd q	41.00	4th
Overall	Maria Delfina Cuglievan			DNS	

== Weightlifting ==
Athlete	Event	Snatch			Clean & Jerk			Total	Rank
Athlete	Event	Attempt 1	Attempt 2	Attempt 3	Attempt 1	Attempt 2	Attempt 3	Total	Rank
Hernán Viera	Men's 94 kg	130	135	~~137~~	170	~~176~~	~~176~~	305	10th
Fiorela del Rocio Ramirez	Women's 48 kg	58	~~62~~	~~62~~	73	78	~~82~~	136	9th
Silvana Saldarriaga	Women's 63 kg	70	~~74~~	74	91	96	100	174	6th

== Wrestling ==
Peru has qualified one athlete in the 74 kg men's freestyle category, two athletes in the 55 kg and 74 kg men's Greco-Roman categories, and three athletes in the 48 kg, 55 kg and 63 kg women's freestyle categories.

Men

Freestyle

Athlete	Event	Round of 16	Quarterfinals	Semifinals	Final
Athlete	Event	Opposition Result	Opposition Result	Opposition Result	Opposition Result
Pool Ambrocio	74 kg		Matthew Judah Gentry (CAN); L PO 0 – 3	did not advance	

Greco-Roman

Athlete	Event	Round of 16	Quarterfinals	Semifinals	Final
Athlete	Event	Opposition Result	Opposition Result	Opposition Result	Opposition Result
Cristhian Palavecino	55 kg		Jorge Cardozo (VEN); L PO 0 – 3		Bronze Medal match: Francisco Encarnacion (DOM); L PO 0 – 3
Sixto Cesar Barrera	74 kg		Hansel Mercedes (DOM); L PO 0 – 3	did not advance	

Women

Freestyle

Athlete	Event	Quarterfinals	Semifinals	Final
Athlete	Event	Opposition Result	Opposition Result	Opposition Result
Flor Quispe	48 kg	Carolina Castillo (COL); L PO 0 – 3	did not advance	
Jenny Vanessa Mallqui	55 kg	Tonya Linn Verbeek (CAN); L PO 0 – 3		Bronze Medal match: Lissette Alexandra Antes (ECU); L PP 1 – 3
Yanet Ursula Sovero	63 kg	Sandra Bibiana Roa (COL); L PP 1 – 3	did not advance	
