= Tennis at the Pan American Games =

- No. of events: 5 (men: 2; women: 2; mixed: 1)

Tennis has been an event at the Pan American Games since the first edition in 1951, with the exception of 1971.

Currently, singles and doubles events for both men and women are contested. Mixed doubles was contested until 1995, and a team event was held in 1991 and 1995.

== Medal table ==
Updated after the 2023 Pan American Games.

Place	Nation	Gold medal	Silver medal	Bronze medal	Total
1	United States	27	14	22	63
2	Brazil	18	8	16	42
3	Argentina	17	14	15	46
4	Mexico	14	20	17	51
5	Venezuela	5	2	6	13
6	Colombia	4	5	1	10
7	Chile	3	13	7	23
8	Puerto Rico	1	6	7	14
9	Canada	1	3	2	6
10	Ecuador	1	2	4	7
11	Dominican Republic	0	1	3	3
12	Paraguay	0	1	2	3
13	Uruguay	0	1	1	2
14	Bolivia	0	1	0	1
15	Cuba	0	0	8	8
16	Peru	0	0	3	3
17	Guatemala	0	0	1	1
17	Costa Rica	0	0	1	1
Total		91	91	123	305

== List of medalists ==
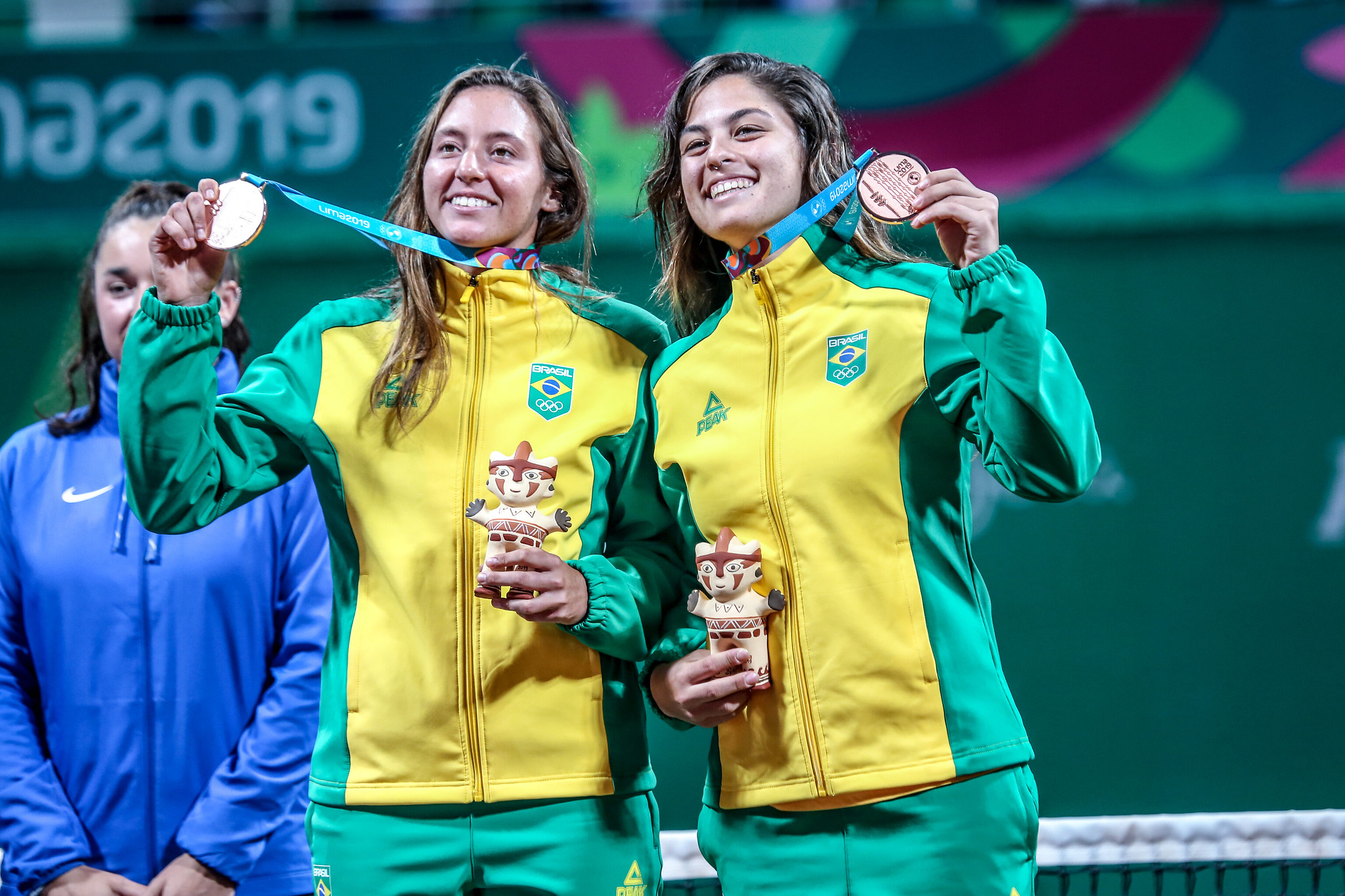
Brazilians Luisa Stefani and Carolina Meligeni Alves, woman's doubles bronze medalists at the 2019 Pan American Games.

== Resources ==
- O Tênis brasileiro nos jogos Pan-Americanos. Confederação Brasileira de Tênis
