= Archery at the 2011 Pan American Games – Qualification =

The athlete quota for archery is 64 athletes, 32 men and 32 women. There is a maximum of six athletes per National Olympic Committee, three per gender. NOC's with three athletes of the same gender automatically qualify for the team competition. There were 2 qualification tournaments for each gender to qualify athletes.

== Qualification summary ==
Nation	Men's Individual	Men's Team	Women's Individual	Women's Team	Total
Argentina	1		3	X	4
Brazil	3	X	3	X	6
Canada	3	X	3	X	6
Chile	2		3	X	5
Colombia	3	X	3	X	6
Cuba	3	X	3	X	6
Dominican Republic			1		1
Ecuador	3	X	1		3
El Salvador	3	X			3
Guatemala	1				1
Mexico	3	X	3	X	6
Puerto Rico	1		3	X	4
United States	3	X	3	X	6
Venezuela	3	X	3	X	6
Total athletes	32	27	32	30	64
Total NOCs	13	9	12	10	14

== Men ==
Event	Location	Ranking	Athletes per NOC	Qualified
Host Nation		-	3	Mexico
2010 Pan American Championships, team event	(Mexico) Guadalajara	Top 7 ^{1}	3	United States; Canada; Cuba; Venezuela; Brazil; Colombia; El Salvador
2010 Pan American Championships, individual event	(Mexico) Guadalajara	Top 4 ^{2}	Up to 3	Guatemala; Ecuador; Ecuador; Ecuador
2011 Second Qualification Tournament	(Dominican Republic) Santo Domingo	Top 4 ^{3}	Up to 3	Chile; Argentina; Puerto Rico; Chile
TOTAL			32	

^1 Excluding Mexico (who finished third at this tournament), who already have qualified.
^2 Excluding teams that qualified from the above criteria.
^3 A nation that qualified two or one athlete can only enter one and two athletes respectively at this tournament. A country that did not qualify an athlete may enter 3.

== Women ==
Event	Location	Ranking	Athletes per NOC	Qualified
Host Nation		-	3	Mexico
2010 Pan American Championships, team event	(Mexico) Guadalajara	Top 7 ^{1}	3	United States; Venezuela; Canada; Colombia; Cuba; Puerto Rico; Brazil
2010 Pan American Championships, individual event	(Mexico) Guadalajara	Top 4 ^{2}	Up to 3	Argentina; Chile; Argentina; Argentina
2011 Second Qualification Tournament	(Dominican Republic) Santo Domingo	Top 4 ^{3}	Up to 3	Ecuador; Dominican Republic; Chile; Chile
TOTAL			32	

^1 Excluding Mexico (who finished first at this tournament), who already have qualified.
^2 Excluding teams that qualified from the above criteria.
^3 A nation that qualified two or one athlete can only enter one and two athletes respectively at this tournament. A country that did not qualify an athlete may enter 3.
