= Fencing at the 2011 Pan American Games – Qualification =

== Qualifying criteria ==
An NOC may enter up to 3 athletes per weapon (épée, foil, or sabre) if it has qualified for the team event and 1 athlete per if it has not.

The top seven teams at the 2010 Pan American Championship plus hosts Mexico qualified a team for each respective team event, and two athletes for the individual event for that weapon. Also this championship qualified the top 2 athletes per event for the individual event if the country had not qualified through the team event.

== Participating nations ==
Nation	Men						Women						Athletes
Nation	Individual Épée	Team Épée	Individual Foil	Team Foil	Individual Sabre	Team Sabre	Individual Épée	Team Épée	Individual Foil	Team Foil	Individual Sabre	Team Sabre	Athletes
Argentina	1		2	X	2	X	2	X			2	X	13
Brazil			2	X	2	X	2	X	2	X	2	X	15
Canada	2	X	2	X	2	X	2	X	2	X	1		16
Chile	2	X	2	X	2	X	2	X	2	X			15
Colombia	2	X			1								4
Costa Rica							1						1
Cuba	2	X	2	X	2	X	2	X	2	X	2	X	18
Dominican Republic							1		1		2	X	5
El Salvador	2	X	1		1				1				6
Guatemala	1												1
Mexico	2	X	2	X	2	X	2	X	2	X	2	X	18
Panama											2	X	3
Puerto Rico			1						2	X	1		5
United States	2	X	2	X	2	X	2	X	2	X	2	X	18
Venezuela	2	X	2	X	2	X	2	X	2	X	2	X	18
Total athletes	18	24	18	24	18	24	18	24	18	24	18	24	156
Total NOCs	10	8	10	8	10	8	10	8	10	8	10	8	15 NOCs

== Men's Épée ==
Team

Event	Date	Location	Vacancies	Qualified
Host Nation	-	-	1	Mexico
2010 Pan American Fencing Championship	August 2–7, 2010	(Costa Rica) San Jose	7	Cuba; Canada; United States; Venezuela; Chile; Colombia; El Salvador
TOTAL			8	

Individual

Team Competition	Date	Vacancies	Qualified
Team Event	-	16	2 from each team.
2010 Pan American Fencing Championship	August 2–7, 2010	2	Argentina; Guatemala

== Men's Foil ==
Team

Event	Date	Location	Vacancies	Qualified
Host Nation	-	-	1	Mexico
2010 Pan American Fencing Championship	August 2–7, 2010	(Costa Rica) San Jose	7	United States; Venezuela; Canada; Cuba; Chile; Brazil; Argentina
TOTAL			8	

Individual

Team Competition	Date	Vacancies	Qualified
Team Event	-	16	2 from each team.
2010 Pan American Fencing Championship	August 2–7, 2010	2	Puerto Rico; El Salvador

== Men's Sabre ==
Team

Event	Date	Location	Vacancies	Qualified
Host Nation	-	-	1	Mexico
2010 Pan American Fencing Championship	August 2–7, 2010	(Costa Rica) San Jose	7	United States; Canada; Venezuela; Brazil; Cuba; Argentina; Chile
TOTAL			8	

Individual

Team Competition	Date	Vacancies	Qualified
Team Event	-	16	2 from each team.
2010 Pan American Fencing Championship	August 2–7, 2010	2	El Salvador; Colombia

== Women's Épée ==
Team

Event	Date	Location	Vacancies	Qualified
Host Nation	-	-	1	Mexico
2010 Pan American Fencing Championship	August 2–7, 2010	(Costa Rica) San Jose	7	Cuba; Canada; United States; Venezuela; Argentina; Brazil; Chile
TOTAL			8	

Individual

Team Competition	Date	Vacancies	Qualified
Team Event	-	16	2 from each team.
2010 Pan American Fencing Championship	August 2–7, 2010	2	Dominican Republic; Costa Rica

== Women's Foil ==
Team

Event	Date	Location	Vacancies	Qualified
Host Nation	-	-	1	Mexico
2010 Pan American Fencing Championship	August 2–7, 2010	(Costa Rica) San Jose	7	United States; Canada; Venezuela; Puerto Rico; Cuba; Chile; Brazil
TOTAL			8	

Individual

Team Competition	Date	Vacancies	Qualified
Team Event	-	16	2 from each team.
2010 Pan American Fencing Championship	August 2–7, 2010	2	El Salvador; Dominican Republic

== Women's Sabre ==
Team

Event	Date	Location	Vacancies	Qualified
Host Nation	-	-	1	Mexico
2010 Pan American Fencing Championship	August 2–7, 2010	(Costa Rica) San Jose	7	United States; ~~Canada~~; Venezuela; Argentina; Brazil; Cuba; Dominican Republic; Panama
TOTAL			8	

Individual

Team Competition	Date	Vacancies	Qualified
Team Event	-	16	2 from each team.
2010 Pan American Fencing Championship	August 2–7, 2010	2	Canada; Puerto Rico

- Canada has withdrawn from the women's sabre team event, with Panama replacing the country in the event after finishing in ninth place at the 2010 Pan American Championship.

== See also ==
Fencing at the 2011 Pan American Games
