= Bowling at the 2011 Pan American Games – Qualification =

A National Olympic Committee (NOC) may enter up to 2 athlete per gender. There is a maximum of 64 competitors allowed (32 per gender).

== Qualification summary ==
Nation	Men's Individual	Men's Pair	Women's Individual	Women's Pair	Total
Aruba			2	X	2
Bahamas			2	X	2
Bermuda	2	X	2	X	4
Bolivia	2	X			2
Brazil	2	X	2	X	4
Canada	2	X	2	X	4
Chile			2	X	2
Colombia	2	X	2	X	4
Costa Rica	2	X	2	X	4
Dominican Republic	2	X	2	X	4
Ecuador	2	X			2
El Salvador	2	X	2	X	4
Guatemala	2	X	2	X	4
Mexico	2	X	2	X	4
Panama	2	X			2
Peru	2	X	2	X	4
Puerto Rico	2	X	2	X	4
United States	2	X	2	X	4
Venezuela	2	X	2	X	4
Total athletes	32	32	32	32	64
Total NOCs	16	16	16	16	19 NOC's

== Men ==
Event	Date	Location	Vacancies	Qualified
Host Nation	-	-	1	Mexico
2009 PABCON Senior Pan American Championship	Sep 20 - Sep 27, 2009	(Puerto Rico) San Juan	15	Bermuda; Bolivia; Brazil; Canada; Colombia; Costa Rica; Dominican Republic; Ecuador; El Salvador; Guatemala; Panama; Peru; Puerto Rico; United States; Venezuela
TOTAL			16	

== Women ==
Event	Date	Location	Vacancies	Qualified
Host Nation	-	-	1	Mexico
2009 PABCON Senior Pan American Championship	Sep 20 - Sep 27, 2009	(Puerto Rico) San Juan	15	Aruba; Bahamas; Bermuda; Brazil; Canada; Chile; Colombia; Costa Rica; Dominican Republic; El Salvador; Guatemala; ~~Panama~~; Peru^{1} Puerto Rico; United States; Venezuela
TOTAL			16	

^1 While the Netherlands Antilles originally qualified, they declined participation and were replaced by Peru.

== See also ==
- Bowling at the 2011 Pan American Games
