= 2011 Pan American Games Parade of Nations =

During the Parade of Nations at the 2011 Pan American Games opening ceremony, held beginning at 18:00 CDT on October 14, 2011, 42 athletes bearing the flags of their respective nations led their national delegations as they paraded into Omnilife Stadium in the host city of Guadalajara, Jalisco, Mexico.

Athletes entered the stadium in an order dictated by tradition. As the host of the first Pan American Games, Argentina entered first. Mexican delegates entered last, representing the host nation. The delegations entered by Spanish alphabetical order as per Pan American Sports Organization protocols, which also happened to be the official languages of the host nation.

The delegation from the Netherlands Antilles marched under the Pan American Sports Organization flag, because their National Olympic Committee had lost official recognition from the International Olympic Committee and the Pan American Sports Organization.

== List ==
Order	Nation	Spanish	Flag bearer	Sport
1	Argentina	Argentina	Walter Pérez	Cycling
2	Antigua and Barbuda	Antigua y Barbuda	Robert Marsh	Cycling
3	Netherlands Antilles (PASO)	Atletas de las antiguas Antillas Holandesas	Perry Lindo	Swimming
4	Aruba	Aruba	Stuart Smit	Taekwondo
5	Bahamas	Bahamas	Alicia Lightbourn	Swimming
6	Barbados	Barbados	Shakera Reece	Athletics
7	Belize	Belice	Albert Jones	Chef de mission
8	Bermuda	Bermuda	Malcolm Smith	Sailing
9	Bolivia	Bolivia	Ricardo Monroy	Racquetball
10	Brazil	Brasil	Hugo Hoyama	Table tennis
11	Canada	Canadá	Christine Sinclair	Football
12	Chile	Chile	David Dubó	Karate
13	Colombia	Colombia	Mariana Pajón	Cycling
14	Costa Rica	Costa Rica	David Jimenez	Boxing
15	Cuba	Cuba	Mijaín López	Wrestling
16	Dominica	Dominica	Erison Hurtault	Athletics
17	Ecuador	Ecuador	Diego Ferrín	Athletics
18	El Salvador	El Salvador	Pamela Benítez	Swimming
19	United States	Estados Unidos de América	Jason Read	Rowing
20	Grenada	Granada	Joel Redhead	Athletics
21	Guatemala	Guatemala	Kevin Cordón	Badminton
22	Guyana	Guyana	David Rajjab	Taekwondo
23	Haiti	Haití		
24	Honduras	Honduras	Randy Lambert	Wrestling
25	Cayman Islands	Islas Caimán	Jessica McTaggart	Equestrian
26	Virgin Islands	Islas Vírgenes de los Estados Unidos	Hans Lawaetz	NOC President
27	British Virgin Islands	Islas Vírgenes Británicas	Keron Stoute	Athletics
28	Jamaica	Jamaica	Marloe Rodman	Cycling
29	Nicaragua	Nicaragua	Dalia Torrez	Swimming
30	Panama	Panamá	Gabriela Mizrachi	Equestrian
31	Paraguay	Paraguay	Ben Hockin	Swimming
32	Peru	Perú	Vanessa Mallqui	Wrestling
33	Puerto Rico	Puerto Rico	Luis Rivera	Gymnastics
34	Dominican Republic	República Dominicana	Dionicio Gustavo	Karate
35	Saint Kitts and Nevis	San Cristóbal y Nieves	Antoine Adams	Athletics
36	Saint Lucia	Santa Lucía	Levern Spencer	Athletics
37	Saint Vincent and the Grenadines	San Vicente y las Granadinas	Kineke Alexander	Athletics
38	Suriname	Surinam	Crystal Leefmans	Badminton
39	Trinidad and Tobago	Trinidad y Tobago		
40	Uruguay	Uruguay	Marcelo Chirico	Equestrian
41	Venezuela	Venezuela	Andreina Pinto	Swimming
42	Mexico	México	Juan René Serrano	Archery
