= Bowling at the 2011 Pan American Games – Men's individual =

Men's individual at the 2011 Pan American Games
- Venue: Bolearmo Tapatio
- Dates: October 24 – 27

Medalists
Gold medal	Santiago Mejía	Colombia
Silver medal	Chris Barnes	United States
Bronze medal	Marcelo Suartz	Brazil
Bronze medal	Manuel Fernandez	Dominican Republic

The men's individual competition of the bowling events at the 2011 Pan American Games will take place between the 24 and 27 of October at the Bolearmo Tapatio. The defending Pan American Games champion is Rhino Page of the United States, while the defending Pan American Championship champion is Manuel Otalora of Colombia.

== Qualification round ==
In the qualification round, the bowlers are ranked according to their performance across twelve bowling games. The top sixteen bowlers advance to the knockout round.

Player	Block 1 (Games 1–6)						Block 2 (Games 7–12)						Total	Average	Rank
Player	1	2	3	4	5	6	7	8	9	10	11	12	Total	Average	Rank
Chris Barnes (USA)	227	243	246	255	290	237	204	204	244	249	203	247	2849	237.4	1
Bill O'Neill (USA)	215	276	246	246	290	238	177	213	266	205	222	169	2763	230.3	2
Amleto Monacelli (VEN)	216	211	204	258	245	193	247	233	256	217	224	187	2691	224.3	3
Andrés Gómez (COL)	190	237	213	234	211	268	204	266	233	202	229	173	2660	221.7	4
Alejandro Cruz (MEX)	262	204	214	246	227	257	174	189	207	203	243	232	2658	221.5	5
Manuel Fernández (DOM)	246	210	200	258	198	248	168	188	211	193	244	244	2608	217.3	6
Francisco Colon (PUR)	214	259	244	197	203	214	181	231	187	180	237	258	2605	217.1	7
José Lander (VEN)	196	237	277	205	226	202	222	226	191	191	220	211	2604	217.0	8
Santiago Mejía (COL)	236	223	243	228	214	249	208	243	156	193	210	198	2601	216.8	9
Alejandro Reyna (CRC)	203	233	224	216	245	235	190	252	236	210	187	168	2599	216.6	10
Ernesto Franco (MEX)	266	181	184	204	227	236	233	238	211	178	224	214	2596	216.3	11
Marcelo Suartz (BRA)	205	210	179	258	241	258	196	206	193	174	159	204	2483	206.9	12
Andraunick Simounet (PUR)	192	255	211	210	166	169	225	195	203	216	213	226	2481	206.8	13
Mario Valverde (CRC)	223	160	204	205	206	246	201	197	206	248	180	179	2455	204.6	14
Rolando Sebelen (DOM)	224	235	185	216	187	202	240	167	212	186	212	179	2445	203.8	15
Arthur Oliver (CAN)	214	175	217	215	235	216	160	212	174	209	214	198	2439	203.3	16
Levinc Samuels (BER)	222	192	203	163	211	228	201	201	246	159	220	168	2414	201.2	17
Mark Buffa (CAN)	170	182	246	232	206	237	179	203	162	154	227	168	2366	197.2	18
Miguel Aguilar (GUA)	224	204	187	203	205	223	172	202	188	176	187	194	2365	197.1	19
Adolfo Vargas (PER)	211	202	196	170	210	214	205	174	181	221	174	179	2337	194.8	20
Diogenes Saverio (ECU)	177	206	175	254	194	227	215	188	142	170	207	182	2337	194.8	21
Victor Tateishi (PER)	177	228	203	176	175	235	164	194	212	182	245	145	2336	194.7	22
Mauricio Piñol (GUA)	139	170	179	226	233	217	172	223	222	202	180	170	2333	194.4	23
Mario Lemos (ECU)	197	191	161	219	183	199	199	158	199	220	187	172	2285	190.4	24
Juan Narvaez (PAN)	176	237	172	180	156	179	176	198	199	185	182	203	2243	186.9	25
Marcio Vieira (BRA)	177	188	187	194	153	212	186	199	171	156	218	202	2243	186.9	26
Sebastian Nemtala (BOL)	211	212	169	205	205	190	122	188	175	200	180	186	2243	186.9	27
Diego Esposito (PAN)	149	164	174	235	192	195	177	190	216	213	163	150	2218	184.8	28
Francisco Sanchez (ESA)	213	198	170	158	160	156	187	175	191	179	216	164	2167	180.6	29
Ignacio Rojas (BOL)	157	187	181	168	186	174	131	201	185	181	197	199	2147	178.9	30
Damien Matthews (BER)	158	201	180	160	189	146	210	169	171	139	180	236	2139	178.3	31
Angel Ortiz (ESA)	183	176	206	189	162	150	171	145	198	174	152	180	2086	173.8	32

== Playoffs ==
Eighth-finals
1	Chris Barnes (USA)	655
16	Arthur Oliver (CAN)	587
2	Bill O'Neill (USA)	718
15	Rolando Sebelen (DOM)	561
3	Amleto Monacelli (VEN)	614
14	Mario Valverde (CRC)	645
4	Andrés Gómez (COL)	612
13	Andraunick Simounet (PUR)	587
5	Alejandro Cruz (MEX)	689
12	Marcelo Suartz (BRA)	718
6	Manuel Fernández (DOM)	678
11	Ernesto Franco (MEX)	582
7	Francisco Colon (PUR)	624
10	Alejandro Reyna (CRC)	619
8	José Lander (VEN)	560
9	Santiago Mejía (COL)	570

Quarterfinals
1	Bill O'Neill (USA)	589
8	Santiago Mejía (COL)	711
2	Marcelo Suartz (BRA)	682
7	Andrés Gómez (COL)	668
3	Manuel Fernández (DOM)	665
6	Francisco Colon (PUR)	625
4	Chris Barnes (USA)	760
5	Mario Valverde (CRC)	535

Semifinals
1	Chris Barnes (USA)	227	191	223
4	Manuel Fernández (DOM)	235	144	177
2	Santiago Mejía (COL)	225	223	217
3	Marcelo Suartz (BRA)	160	232	193

Final
1	Chris Barnes (USA)	171	193
2	Santiago Mejía (COL)	189	205
