= Wrestling at the 2011 Pan American Games – Men's Greco-Roman 55 kg =

Men's Greco–Roman 55 kg at the 2011 Pan American Games
- Venue: CODE II Gymnasium
- Dates: October 20
- Competitors: 8 from 8 nations

Medalists
Gold medal	Gustavo Balart	Cuba
Silver medal	Jorge Cardozo	Venezuela
Bronze medal	Juan Carlos López	Colombia
Bronze medal	Franscisco Encarnacion	Dominican Republic

The men's Greco–Roman 55 kg competition of the wrestling events at the 2011 Pan American Games in Guadalajara, Mexico, was held on October 20 at the CODE II Gymanasium. The defending champion was Jagniel Hernandez from Cuba.

This Greco-Roman wrestling competition consists of a single-elimination tournament, with a repechage used to determine the winner of two bronze medals. The two finalists face off for gold and silver medals. Each wrestler who loses to one of the two finalists moves into the repechage, culminating in a pair of bronze medal matches featuring the semifinal losers each facing the remaining repechage opponent from their half of the bracket.

Each bout consists of up to three rounds, lasting two minutes apiece. The wrestler who scores more points in each round is the winner of that rounds; the bout ends when one wrestler has won two rounds (and thus the match).

== Schedule ==
All times are Central Standard Time (UTC-6).

Date	Time	Round
October 20, 2011	10:00	Qualification
October 20, 2011	10:30	Preliminary bouts
October 20, 2011	18:00	Bronze medal matches
October 20, 2011	18:32	Final

== Results ==
=== Main bracket ===
Quarterfinals
Alberto Mendieta (NIC)	0	0
Gustavo Balart (CUB)	3	7
Juan Carlos López (COL)	2	1
7	Rafael Pascoa (BRA)	0	0
Ildefonso Aranguire (MEX)	0	0
Francisco Encarnacion (DOM)	1	2
Jorge Cardozo (VEN)	6	1
Christian Paravecino (PER)	0	0

Semifinals
Gustavo Balart (CUB)	2	1
Juan Carlos López (COL)	0	0
Francisco Encarnacion (DOM)	0	0
Jorge Cardozo (VEN)	2	2

Finals
Gustavo Balart (CUB)	0	2	2
Jorge Cardozo (VEN)	1	0	0

=== Repechage ===
Two bronze medals were awarded.

Repechage round 1	Bronze Medal Bout
	Juan Carlos López (COL)	1 6 6
Alberto Mendieta (NIC)	Alberto Mendieta (NIC)	1 0 0
Bye

Repechage round 1	Bronze Medal Bout
	Francisco Encarnacion (DOM)	1 7
Cristhian Paravencino (PER)	Cristhian Paravencino (PER)	0 0
Bye
