= Wrestling at the 2011 Pan American Games – Men's Greco-Roman 84 kg =

Men's Greco–Roman 84 kg at the 2011 Pan American Games
- Venue: CODE II Gymnasium
- Dates: October 20
- Competitors: 8 from 8 nations

Medalists
| Gold medal | Pablo Shorey | Cuba |
| Silver medal | Cristian Mosquera | Colombia |
| Bronze medal | José Arias | Dominican Republic |
| Bronze medal | Yorgen Cova | Venezuela |

The men's Greco–Roman 84 kg competition of the wrestling events at the 2011 Pan American Games in Guadalajara, Mexico, was held on October 20 at the CODE II Gymanasium. The defending champion was Brad Vering from the United States.

This Greco-Roman wrestling competition consists of a single-elimination tournament, with a repechage used to determine the winner of two bronze medals. The two finalists face off for gold and silver medals. Each wrestler who loses to one of the two finalists moves into the repechage, culminating in a pair of bronze medal matches featuring the semifinal losers each facing the remaining repechage opponent from their half of the bracket.

Each bout consists of up to three rounds, lasting two minutes apiece. The wrestler who scores more points in each round is the winner of that rounds; the bout ends when one wrestler has won two rounds (and thus the match).

== Schedule ==
All times are Central Standard Time (UTC−6).

| Date | Time | Round |
|---|---|---|
| October 20, 2011 | 10:40 | Quarterfinals |
| October 20, 2011 | 11:28 | Semifinals |
| October 20, 2011 | 18:16 | Bronze medal matches |
| October 20, 2011 | 18:48 | Final |

== Results ==
=== Finals round ===
Quarterfinals
José Arias (DOM) | 3 | 0 | 3
Chaight Haight (USA) | 1 | 2 | 2
Pablo Shorey (CUB) | 2 | 4
Jose Mendoza (MEX) | 0 | 0
Marcelo Gomes (BRA) | 0 | 0
Cristian Mosquera (COL) | 1 | 2
Yorgen Cova (VEN) | 2 | 1
Eric Feunekes (CAN) | 0 | 0

Semifinals
José Arias (DOM) | 1 | 0
Pablo Shorey (CUB) | 1 | 5
Cristian Mosquera (COL) | 2 | 1
Yorgen Cova (VEN) | 0 | 0

Finals
Pablo Shorey (CUB) | 3 | 1
Cristian Mosquera (COL) | 0 | 0

=== Repechage round ===
Two bronze medals were awarded.

| Repechage round 1 | Bronze Medal Bout |
| | José Arias (DOM) | 1 1 |
| Jose Mendoza (MEX) | Jose Mendoza (MEX) | 0 0 |
| Bye |

| Repechage round 1 | Bronze Medal Bout |
| | Yorgen Cova (VEN) | 2 3 |
| Marcelo Gomes (BRA) | Marcelo Gomes (BRA) | 0 0 |
| Bye |
