= Shooting at the 2011 Pan American Games – Men's 50 metre rifle three positions =

Shooting – Men's 50 metre rifle three positions at the 2011 Pan American Games
- Venue: Jalisco Hunting Club
- Dates: October 21
- Competitors: 23 from 14 nations

Medalists
Gold medal	Jason Parker	United States
Silver medal	Matthew Wallace	United States
Bronze medal	Bruno Heck	Brazil

The men's 50 metre rifle three positions shooting event at the 2011 Pan American Games was held on October 21 at the Jalisco Hunting Club in Guadalajara. The defending Pan American Games champion is Jason Parker of the United States.

The event consisted of two rounds: a qualifier and a final. In the qualifier, each shooter fired 120 shots with a .22 Long Rifle at 50 metres distance. 40 shots were fired each from the standing, kneeling, and prone positions. Scores for each shot were in increments of 1, with a maximum score of 10.

The top 8 shooters in the qualifying round moved on to the final round. There, they fired an additional 10 shots, all from the standing position. These shots scored in increments of .1, with a maximum score of 10.9. The total score from all 130 shots was used to determine the final ranking.

== Schedule ==
All times are Central Standard Time (UTC-6).

Date	Time	Round
October 21, 2011	9:00	Qualification
October 21, 2011	15:00	Final

== Records ==
The existing world and Pan American Games records were as follows.

Qualification records
World record	Rajmond Debevec (SLO)	1186	Munich, Germany	August 29, 1992
Pan American record	Jason Parker (USA)	1173	Rio de Janeiro, Brazil	July 19, 2007

Final records
World record	Rajmond Debevec (SLO)	1287.9 (1186+101.9)	Munich, Germany	August 29, 1992
Pan American record	Jason Parker (USA)	1274.6 (1173+101.6)	Rio de Janeiro, Brazil	July 19, 2007

== Results ==
=== Qualification round ===
23 athletes from 14 countries competed.

Rank	Athlete	Country	Prone	Stand	Kneel	Total	Notes
1	Jason Parker	United States	398	376	381	1155	Q
2	Bruno Heck	Brazil	394	376	383	1153	Q
3	Matthew Wallace	United States	395	368	387	1150	Q
4	Blas Ruiz	Mexico	397	368	387	1149	Q
5	Reynier Estopiñan	Cuba	393	368	386	1147	Q
6	Julio Iemma	Venezuela	394	378	373	1145	Q
7	Jose Luis Sanchez	Mexico	392	373	380	1145	Q
8	Grzegorz Sych	Canada	391	371	381	1143	Q
9	Rocco Rosito	Brazil	394	363	383	1140	
10	Elias San Martin	Chile	387	369	382	1138	
11	Pablo Damian Alvarez	Argentina	396	366	374	1136	
12	Rafael Espinoza	El Salvador	393	366	373	1132	
13	Marcos Huerta	Chile	388	372	367	1127	
14	Elvin Aroldo Lopez	Guatemala	389	367	371	1127	
15	Juan Diego Angeloni	Argentina	393	354	378	1125	
16	Raul Vargas	Venezuela	396	356	372	1124	
17	Marlon Rolando Perez	Guatemala	390	363	369	1122	
18	Yoleisy Lois	Cuba	391	361	370	1122	
19	Cesar Renato Yui	Peru	381	368	369	1118	
20	Walter Martinez	Nicaragua	384	346	364	1094	
21	Guido Farfan	Peru	391	339	362	1092	
22	Hosman Duran	Dominican Republic	385	303	363	1051	
23	Alexander Rivera	Puerto Rico	—	—	—	DNS	

=== Final ===
Rank	Athlete	Qual	1	2	3	4	5	6	7	8	9	10	Final	Total	Notes
1st place, gold medalist(s)	Jason Parker (USA)	1155	8.5	8.9	9.3	10.2	9.6	9.6	9.1	9.0	9.9	10.0	94.1	1249.1	
2nd place, silver medalist(s)	Matthew Wallace (USA)	1150	10.3	10.8	8.4	10.3	8.8	9.5	9.9	10.4	9.9	8.7	97.0	1247.0	
3rd place, bronze medalist(s)	Bruno Heck (BRA)	1153	9.3	8.1	9.0	9.2	10.0	7.3	9.9	9.4	10.5	9.3	92.0	1245.0	
4	Blas Ruiz (MEX)	1149	9.6	10.4	9.3	10.3	8.3	9.1	10.0	9.9	9.4	8.0	94.3	1243.3	
5	Reynier Estopiñan (CUB)	1147	9.7	9.5	9.6	10.1	7.7	9.6	10.4	10.0	10.5	8.8	95.9	1242.9	
6	Jose Luis Sanchez (MEX)	1145	10.1	9.3	10.6	9.4	9.6	8.0	10.6	9.2	10.0	9.7	95.5	1240.5	
7	Grzegorz Sych (CAN)	1143	9.3	8.7	9.7	9.3	10.2	10.4	10.5	10.3	9.6	9.2	97.2	1240.2	
8	Julio Iemma (VEN)	1145	10.4	10.5	9.9	9.8	8.5	7.8	8.0	9.9	10.4	9.7	94.9	1239.9	
