= Weightlifting at the 2011 Pan American Games – Women's +75 kg =

Weightlifting – Women's +75 kg at the 2011 Pan American Games
- Venue: Weightlifting Forum
- Dates: October 27
- Competitors: 9 from 7 nations

Medalists
Gold medal	Oliba Nieve	Ecuador
Silver medal	Yaniuska Espinoza	Venezuela
Bronze medal	Tania Mascorro	Mexico

The women's +75 kg competition of the weightlifting events at the 2011 Pan American Games in Guadalajara, Mexico, was held on October 27 at the Weightlifting Forum. The defending champion was Seledina Nieves from Ecuador.

Each lifter performed in both the snatch and clean and jerk lifts, with the final score being the sum of the lifter's best result in each. The athlete received three attempts in each of the two lifts; the score for the lift was the heaviest weight successfully lifted. This weightlifting event was the heaviest women's event at the weightlifting competition, allowing competitors to have as much body mass without a limit.

== Schedule ==
All times are Central Standard Time (UTC-6).

Date	Time	Round
October 27, 2011	14:00	Final

== Results ==
9 athletes from 7 countries took part.

Rank	Name	Country	Group	B.weight (kg)	Snatch (kg)	Clean & Jerk (kg)	Total (kg)
1st place, gold medalist(s)	Oliba Nieve	Ecuador	A	94.54	113	145	258
2nd place, silver medalist(s)	Yaniuska Espinoza	Venezuela	A	107.83	109	136	245
3rd place, bronze medalist(s)	Tania Mascorro	Mexico	A	100.80	109	135	244
4	Verónica Saladín	Dominican Republic	A	103.17	107	125	232
5	Rosa Matos	Dominican Republic	A	95.85	98	125	223
6	Astrid Camposeco	Guatemala	A	86.15	83	115	198
7	Nubia Gomez	Puerto Rico	A	108.18	85	107	192
–	Sarah Robles	United States	A	119.05	112	–	DNF
–	Chioma Amaechi	United States	A	110.39			DNF
