= Wrestling at the 2011 Pan American Games – Men's freestyle 60 kg =

Men's Freestyle 60 kg at the 2011 Pan American Games
- Venue: CODE II Gymnasium
- Dates: October 24
- Competitors: 9 from 9 nations

Medalists
Gold medal	Franklin Gomez	Puerto Rico
Silver medal	Guillermo Torres	Mexico
Bronze medal	Luis Portillo	El Salvador
Bronze medal	Yowlys Bonne	Cuba

The men's freestyle 60 kg competition of the wrestling events at the 2011 Pan American Games in Guadalajara, Mexico, was held on October 24 at the CODE II Gymanasium. The defending champion was Yandro Quintana from Cuba.

This freestyle wrestling competition followed a single-elimination format, with a repechage to award two bronze medals. The two finalists faced off for gold and silver medals. Wrestlers who lost to the finalists advanced to the repechage, leading to two bronze medal matches where semifinal losers faced the last remaining repechage opponent from their bracket.

Each bout consisted of up to three rounds, lasting two minutes apiece. The wrestler who scored more points in each round was the winner of that rounds; the bout finished when one wrestler had won two rounds (and thus the match).

== Schedule ==
All times are Central Standard Time (UTC-6).

Date	Time	Round
October 24, 2011	10:00	Preliminary bout
October 24, 2011	10:08	Quarterfinals
October 24, 2011	10:56	Semifinals
October 24, 2011	18:32	Bronze medal matches
October 24, 2011	18:40	Final

== Results ==
=== Main bracket ===
1/8 Finals
Wilfredo Henriquez (VEN)	1	0
Yowlys Bonne (CUB)	3	6

Quarterfinals
Guillermo Torres (MEX)	3	5
Luis Portillo (ESA)	0	3
Nelson Garcia (COL)	0	1
Fernando Iglesias (ARG)	2	2
Gabriel García (DOM)	0	0
Franklin Gomez (PUR)	4	4
Ryley Walker (CAN)	1	0
Yowlys Bonne (CUB)	3	9

Semifinals
Guillermo Torres (MEX)	4
Fernando Iglesias (ARG)	0
Franklin Gomez (PUR)	2	3
Yowlys Bonne (CUB)	0	0

Finals
Guillermo Torres (MEX)	0	0
Franklin Gomez (PUR)	3	6

=== Repechage round ===
Two bronze medals were awarded.

Repechage round 1	Bronze Medal Bout
	~~Fernando Iglesias (ARG)~~ (Note: The argentinian Fernando Iglesias lost the bronze medal in wrestling category of 60 kg for giving positive in cases of doping, the medal was assigned to the salvadoran Luis Portillo (Source).)	5 4
Luis Portillo (ESA)	Luis Portillo (ESA)	0 0
Bye

Repechage round 1		Bronze Medal Bout
		Yowlys Bonne (CUB)	4 3
Gabriel García (DOM)	'	Gabriel García (DOM)	0 3
Bye
