= Table tennis at the 2011 Pan American Games – Men's singles =

The men's singles table tennis event at the 2011 Pan American Games was held from 18–20 October 2011 at the CODE Dome in Guadalajara, Mexico.

== Medals ==
Gold	Liu Song; Argentina
Silver	Marcos Madrid; Mexico
Bronze	Lin Ju; Dominican Republic
Bronze	Alberto Mino; Ecuador

== Round robin ==
The round robin was used as a qualification round. The forty participants were split into groups of four. The top two players from each group advanced to the first round of playoffs. Groups were announced at the technical meeting the day before the competition began.

=== Group A ===
Player	Pld	W	L	GF	GA	PF	PA	Points
Liu Song (ARG)	3	3	0	12	1	143	74	6
Marco Navas (VEN)	3	1	2	7	10	140	163	4
Alejandro Rodríguez (CHI)	3	1	2	7	10	148	168	4
Hector Gatica (GUA)	3	1	2	6	11	141	167	4

=== Group B ===
Player	Pld	W	L	GF	GA	PF	PA	Points
Lin Ju (DOM)	3	3	0	12	2	149	91	6
Mark Hazinski (USA)	3	2	1	9	6	133	112	5
Pavel Oxamendi (CUB)	3	1	2	7	10	146	157	4
Luis Mejía (ESA)	3	0	3	2	12	82	150	3

=== Group C ===
Player	Pld	W	L	GF	GA	PF	PA	Points
Gustavo Tsuboi (BRA)	3	3	0	12	2	154	112	6
Alexander Echavarria (COL)	3	2	1	9	10	173	178	5
Henry Mujica (VEN)	3	1	2	8	9	153	155	4
Dino Suarez (ECU)	3	0	3	4	12	140	175	3

=== Group D ===
Player	Pld	W	L	GF	GA	PF	PA	Points
Thiago Monteiro (BRA)	3	3	0	12	5	170	143	6
Felipe Olivares (CHI)	3	2	1	10	7	167	157	5
Jonathan Pino (VEN)	3	1	2	10	9	188	176	4
Saul Bonilla (ESA)	3	0	3	1	12	92	141	3

=== Group E ===
Player	Pld	W	L	GF	GA	PF	PA	Points
Hugo Hoyama (BRA)	3	3	0	12	1	150	93	6
Pierre-Luc Hinse (CAN)	3	2	1	9	5	143	127	5
Josue Donado (ESA)	3	1	2	4	10	96	130	4
Heber Moscoso (GUA)	3	0	3	3	12	108	147	3

=== Group F ===
Player	Pld	W	L	GF	GA	PF	PA	Points
Alberto Mino (ECU)	3	3	0	12	3	161	136	6
Guillermo Munoz (MEX)	3	1	2	9	9	164	168	4
Pradeeban Peter-Paul (CAN)	3	1	2	7	11	163	166	4
Timothy Wang (USA)	3	1	2	6	11	146	164	4

=== Group G ===
Player	Pld	W	L	GF	GA	PF	PA	Points
Marcelo Aguirre (PAR)	3	3	0	12	4	166	141	6
Dexter St. Louis (TRI)	3	2	1	9	10	191	188	5
Juan Acosta (PER)	3	1	2	10	10	184	182	4
Geovanny Coello (ECU)	3	0	3	5	12	154	184	3

=== Group H ===
Player	Pld	W	L	GF	GA	PF	PA	Points
Marcos Madrid (MEX)	3	2	1	9	9	177	167	5
Jorge Campos (CUB)	3	2	1	11	8	193	177	5
Pablo Tabachnik (ARG)	3	1	2	9	10	184	195	4
Juan Vila (DOM)	3	1	2	7	9	151	166	4

=== Group I ===
Player	Pld	W	L	GF	GA	PF	PA	Points
Andy Pereira (CUB)	3	3	0	12	4	170	138	6
Yiyong Fan (USA)	3	2	1	10	5	159	136	5
Emil Santos (DOM)	3	1	2	4	11	108	138	4
Jude Okoh (MEX)	3	0	3	6	12	150	175	3

=== Group J ===
Player	Pld	W	L	GF	GA	PF	PA	Points
Jose Miguel Ramirez (GUA)	3	2	1	11	6	174	148	5
Pierre-Luc Thériault (CAN)	3	2	1	11	7	173	160	5
Gaston Alto (ARG)	3	2	1	10	9	170	172	5
Andres Carlier (CHI)	3	0	3	2	12	144	151	3

== Playoffs ==
=== Finals ===
Semifinals								Final
Liu Song (ARG)	11	11	10	11	11
Alberto Mino (ECU) (bronze)	9	7	12	7	3			Liu Song (ARG) (gold)	11	11	5	11	11
Marcos Madrid (MEX)	8	11	4	11	11	6	11	Marcos Madrid (MEX) (silver)	8	6	11	7	9
Lin Ju (DOM) (bronze)	11	9	11	9	4	11	6

=== Top half ===
First Round
Mark Hazinski (USA)	4	9	7	12	6
Dexter St. Louis (TRI)	11	11	11	10	11
Felipe Olivares (CHI)	2	11	6	10	11	2
Jorge Campos (CUB)	11	9	11	12	5	11

Second Round
Liu Song (ARG)	11	11	9	11	11
Dexter St. Louis (TRI)	7	6	11	3	8
Andy Pereira (CUB)	7	11	11	11	5	11
Hugo Hoyama (BRA)	11	9	3	8	11	8
Alberto Mino (ECU)	11	11	11	11
Pierre-Luc Thériault (CAN)	7	4	6	8
Jorge Campos (CUB)	11	7	10	8	11	11	11
Gustavo Tsuboi (BRA)	8	11	12	11	8	4	8

Quarterfinals
Liu Song (ARG)	11	9	8	11	11	11
Andy Pereira (CUB)	5	11	11	5	8	7
Alberto Mino (ECU)	11	7	11	5	11	11
Jorge Campos (CUB)	9	11	5	11	9	7

Semifinals
Liu Song (ARG)	11	11	10	11	11
Alberto Mino (ECU)	9	7	12	7	3

=== Bottom half ===
First Round
Marco Navas (VEN)	11	13	11	10	8	11
Yiyong Fan (USA)	2	11	8	12	11	5
Guillermo Munoz (MEX)	9	7	9	2
Alexander Echavarria (COL)	11	11	11	11

Second Round
Thiago Monteiro (BRA)	11	11	11	4	11
Marco Navas (VEN)	4	7	1	11	7
Jose Miguel Ramirez (GUA)	13	5	8	8	11	11	1
Marcos Madrid (MEX)	11	11	11	11	7	9	11
Marcelo Aguirre (PAR)	6	11	11	11	14
Pierre-Luc Hinse (CAN)	11	5	5	9	12
Alexander Echavarria (COL)	8	6	6	11	9
Lin Ju (DOM)	11	11	11	8	11

Quarterfinals
Thiago Monteiro (BRA)	1	9	8	11	6
Marcos Madrid (MEX)	11	11	11	8	11
Marcelo Aguirre (PAR)	7	4	8	8
Lin Ju (DOM)	11	11	11	11

Semifinals
Marcos Madrid (MEX)	8	11	4	11	11	6	11
Lin Ju (DOM)	11	9	11	9	4	11	6
