= Weightlifting at the 2011 Pan American Games – Women's 53 kg =

Weightlifting – Women's 53 kg at the 2011 Pan American Games
- Venue: Weightlifting Forum
- Dates: October 24
- Competitors: 11 from 9 nations

Medalists
| Gold medal | Yuderquis Contreras | Dominican Republic |
| Silver medal | Inmara Henriquez | Venezuela |
| Bronze medal | Francia Peñuñuri | Mexico |

The women's 53 kg competition of the weightlifting events at the 2011 Pan American Games in Guadalajara, Mexico, was held on October 23 at the Weightlifting Forum. The defending champion was Yuderquis Contreras from the Dominican Republic.

Each lifter performed in both the snatch and clean and jerk lifts, with the final score being the sum of the lifter's best result in each. The athlete received three attempts in each of the two lifts; the score for the lift was the heaviest weight successfully lifted. This weightlifting event was the second lightest women's event at the weightlifting competition, limiting competitors to a maximum of 53 kilograms of body mass.

== Schedule ==
All times are Central Standard Time (UTC-6).

| Date | Time | Round |
|---|---|---|
| October 24, 2011 | 12:00 | Final |

== Results ==
11 athletes from 9 countries took part.

- PR – Pan American Games record

| Rank | Name | Country | Group | B.weight (kg) | Snatch (kg) | Clean & Jerk (kg) | Total (kg) |
|---|---|---|---|---|---|---|---|
| 1st place, gold medalist(s) | Yuderquis Contreras | Dominican Republic | A | 52.63 | 96 PR | 110 | 206 |
| 2nd place, silver medalist(s) | Inmara Henriquez | Venezuela | A | 52.57 | 80 | 109 | 189 |
| 3rd place, bronze medalist(s) | Francia Peñuñuri | Mexico | A | 52.41 | 83 | 105 | 188 |
| 4 | Yineisy Reyes | Dominican Republic | A | 52.86 | 88 | 95 | 183 |
| 5 | Hilary Katzenmeier | United States | A | 52.60 | 75 | 100 | 175 |
| 6 | Malvina Veron | Argentina | A | 52.03 | 72 | 93 | 165 |
| 7 | Alexandra Andagoya | Ecuador | A | 52.89 | 67 | 94 | 161 |
| 8 | Magdalena Cojom | Guatemala | A | 52.31 | 68 | 83 | 151 |
| 9 | Norel Castillo | Puerto Rico | A | 52.20 | 60 | 78 | 138 |
| 10 | Joan Rivera | Puerto Rico | A | 52.89 | 62 | 76 | 138 |
| 11 | Tumy Gomez | Honduras | A | 51.83 | 56 | 65 | 121 |

== New records ==
The following records were established and improved upon during the competition.

| Snatch | 96.0 kg | Yuderquis Contreras (DOM) | PR |
