= Karate at the 2011 Pan American Games =

- Venue: San Rafael Gymnasium
- Dates: October 27 – October 29
- Competitors: 80 from 20 nations

The Karate competition of the 2011 Pan American Games in Guadalajara, Mexico were held at the San Rafael Gymnasium between October 27 and October 29. All the competitions was held in the kumite discipline.

== Medal summary ==
=== Medal table ===
* Host nation (Mexico)

Rank	Nation	Gold	Silver	Bronze	Total
1	Dominican Republic	2	3	0	5
2	Venezuela	2	0	3	5
3	Mexico*	1	3	2	6
4	United States	1	1	0	2
5	Brazil	1	0	4	5
6	Guatemala	1	0	1	2
7	Colombia	1	0	0	1
7	Ecuador	1	0	0	1
9	Chile	0	1	4	5
10	Cuba	0	1	2	3
11	Peru	0	1	0	1
12	Canada	0	0	3	3
13	Netherlands Antilles	0	0	1	1
Totals (13 entries)		10	10	20	40

=== Men's events ===
Event	Gold	Silver	Bronze
60 kg	Andrés Rendón; Colombia	Norberto Sosa; Dominican Republic	Douglas Brose; Brazil
60 kg	Andrés Rendón; Colombia	Norberto Sosa; Dominican Republic	Miguel Soffia; Chile
67 kg	Daniel Viveros; Ecuador	Dennis Novo; Cuba	Daniel Carrillo; Mexico
67 kg	Daniel Viveros; Ecuador	Dennis Novo; Cuba	Jean Carlos Peña; Venezuela
75 kg	Dionicio Gustavo; Dominican Republic	Thomas Scott; United States	Lester Zamora; Cuba
75 kg	Dionicio Gustavo; Dominican Republic	Thomas Scott; United States	David Dubó; Chile
84 kg	Cesar Herrera; Venezuela	Jorge Pérez; Dominican Republic	Homero Morales; Mexico
84 kg	Cesar Herrera; Venezuela	Jorge Pérez; Dominican Republic	Sorin Alexadnru; Canada
+84 kg	Angel Aponte; Venezuela	Alberto Ramirez; Mexico	Wellington Barbosa; Brazil
+84 kg	Angel Aponte; Venezuela	Alberto Ramirez; Mexico	Shaun Dhillon; Canada

=== Women's events ===
Event	Gold	Silver	Bronze
50 kg	Ana Villanueva; Dominican Republic	Gabriela Bruna; Chile	Jéssica Cândido; Brazil
50 kg	Ana Villanueva; Dominican Republic	Gabriela Bruna; Chile	Cheili Gonzalez; Guatemala
55 kg	Shannon Nishi; United States	Karina Diaz; Dominican Republic	Valéria Kumizaki; Brazil
55 kg	Shannon Nishi; United States	Karina Diaz; Dominican Republic	Jessy Reyes; Chile
61 kg	Bertha Gutierrez; Mexico	Alexandra Grande; Peru	Daniela Suarez; Venezuela
61 kg	Bertha Gutierrez; Mexico	Alexandra Grande; Peru	Marisca Verspaget; Netherlands Antilles
68 kg	Lucélia Ribeiro; Brazil	Yadira Lira; Mexico	Yoly Guillen; Venezuela
68 kg	Lucélia Ribeiro; Brazil	Yadira Lira; Mexico	Yoandra Moreno; Cuba
+68 kg	Maria Castellanos; Guatemala	Xhunashi Caballero; Mexico	Olivia Grant; Canada
+68 kg	Maria Castellanos; Guatemala	Xhunashi Caballero; Mexico	Claudia Vera; Chile

== Schedule ==
All times are Central Daylight Time (UTC-5).

Day	Date	Start	Finish	Event	Phase
Day 14	Thursday October 27, 2011	10:00	14:30	Men's +84 kg, Women's +68 kg	Preliminaries
Day 14	Thursday October 27, 2011	16:00	17:20	Men's +84 kg, Women's +68 kg	Semifinals
Day 14	Thursday October 27, 2011	17:25	17:55	Men's +84 kg, Women's +68 kg	Finals
Day 15	Friday October 28, 2011	10:00	14:30	Men's 60 kg, 84 kg, Women's 50 kg, 68 kg	Preliminaries
Day 15	Friday October 28, 2011	16:00	17:20	Men's 60 kg, 84 kg, Women's 50 kg, 68 kg	Semifinals
Day 15	Friday October 28, 2011	17:25	18:30	Men's 60 kg, 84 kg, Women's 50 kg, 68 kg	Finals
Day 16	Saturday October 29, 2011	10:00	14:30	Men's 67 kg, 75 kg, Women's 55 kg, 61 kg	Preliminaries
Day 16	Saturday October 29, 2011	16:00	17:20	Men's 67 kg, 75 kg, Women's 55 kg, 61 kg	Semifinals
Day 16	Saturday October 29, 2011	17:25	18:30	Men's 67 kg, 75 kg, Women's 55 kg, 61 kg	Finals

== Qualification ==
Each nation is allowed enter a maximum of ten athletes (one per weight category). Mexico as host nation receives an entry in each weight category, while all other nations had to qualify through four qualifying tournaments. The following nations qualified:

NOC	Men					Women					Total
NOC	60kg	67kg	75kg	84kg	84+kg	50kg	55kg	61kg	68kg	68+kg	Total
Argentina					X			X		X	3
Brazil	X				X	X	X		X	X	6
Canada				X	X			X		X	4
Chile	X		X			X	X		X	X	6
Colombia	X			X		X					3
Costa Rica									X		1
Cuba		X	X				X		X		4
Dominican Republic	X	X	X	X		X	X	X	X		8
Ecuador		X	X				X				3
El Salvador	X	X	X	X	X						5
Guatemala						X	X			X	3
Mexico	X	X	X	X	X	X	X	X	X	X	10
Netherlands Antilles								X			1
Panama								X			1
Peru	X	X	X	X				X			5
Puerto Rico					X					X	2
Trinidad and Tobago					X						1
United States	X	X	X			X	X		X		6
Uruguay				X							1
Venezuela		X		X	X	X		X	X	X	7
Total: 20 NOCs	8	8	8	8	8	8	8	8	8	8	80
