= Dominican Republic at the 2011 Pan American Games =

- IOC code: DOM
- NOC: Comité Olímpico Dominicano
- Website: www.colimdo.org

in Guadalajara 14–30 October 2011
- Competitors: 214 in 27 sports
- Flag bearer: Gabriel Mercedes
- Medals Ranked 9th: Gold 7 Silver 9 Bronze 17 Total 33

Pan American Games appearances (overview)
- 1951; 1955; 1959; 1963; 1967; 1971; 1975; 1979; 1983; 1987; 1991; 1995; 1999; 2003; 2007; 2011; 2015; 2019; 2023

The Dominican Republic competed at the 2011 Pan American Games in Guadalajara, Mexico from October 14 to 30, 2011. Gabriel Mercedes a taekwondo athlete was selected to carry the flag during the opening ceremony.

== Medalists ==
Medal	Name	Sport	Event	Date
Gold	Gabriel Mercedes	Taekwondo	Men's 58 kg	October 15
Gold	Jhohanny Jean	Taekwondo	Men's 68 kg	October 16
Gold	Wu Xue; Johenny Valdez; Eva Brito	Table tennis	Women's team	October 17
Gold	Juan Ramírez Beltré	Wrestling	Men's freestyle 55 kg	October 23
Gold	Yuderqui Contreras	Weightlifting	Women's 53 kg	October 24
Gold	Ana Villanueva	Karate	Women's 50 kg	October 28
Gold	Dionicio Gustavo	Karate	Men's 75 kg	October 29
Silver	Wu Xue	Table tennis	Women's singles	October 20
Silver	Anyelo Mota	Wrestling	Men's Greco-Roman 66 kg	October 20
Silver	Luguelín Santos	Athletics	Men's 400 metres	October 26
Silver	Gustavo Cuesta; Winder Cuevas; Arismendy Peguero; Félix Sánchez; Luguelín Santos; Yoel Tapia	Athletics	Men's 4 × 400 metres relay	October 28
Silver	Yenebier Guillén	Boxing	Women's light heavyweight 75 kg	October 28
Silver	Norberto Sosa	Karate	Men's 60 kg	October 28
Silver	Jorge Pérez	Karate	Men's 84 kg	October 28
Silver	Dagoberto Aguero	Boxing	Men's Flyweight 52 kg	October 29
Silver	Karina Diaz	Karate	Women's 55 kg	October 29
Bronze	Katherine Rodríguez	Taekwondo	Women's 67 kg	October 17
Bronze	Lin Ju	Table tennis	Men's singles	October 20
Bronze	Francisco Encarnacion	Wrestling	Men's Greco-Roman 55 kg	October 20
Bronze	José Arias	Wrestling	Men's Greco-Roman 84 kg	October 20
Bronze	Ramón García	Wrestling	Men's Greco-Roman 120 kg	October 20
Bronze	Jansel Ramírez	Wrestling	Men's Greco-Roman 60 kg	October 21
Bronze	Hansel Mercedes	Wrestling	Men's Greco-Roman 74 kg	October 21
Bronze	Víctor Estrella	Tennis	Men's singles	October 22
Bronze	Elsa Sánchez	Wrestling	Women's freestyle 72 kg	October 22
Bronze	Dominican Republic	Handball	Women	October 23
Bronze	Carlos Félix	Wrestling	Men's freestyle 120 kg	October 23
Bronze	Juan Medina	Boxing	Men's Light flyweight 49 kg	October 25
Bronze	Yolanda Osana	Athletics	Women's 400 metres hurdles	October 26
Bronze	Francia Manzanillo	Athletics	Women's heptathlon	October 26
Bronze	Mariely Sánchez	Athletics	Women's 200 metres	October 27
Bronze	Felix Sánchez	Athletics	Men's 400 metres hurdles	October 27
Bronze	Manuel Fernández	Bowling	Men's singles	October 27

== Archery ==
The Dominican Republic has qualified one female athlete in the archery competition.

Women

Athlete	Event	Ranking Round		Round of 32	Round of 16	Quarterfinals	Semifinals	Final	Rank
Athlete	Event	Score	Seed	Opposition Score	Opposition Score	Opposition Score	Opposition Score	Opposition Score	Rank
Lya Solano	Women's individual	1249	17	L Pagan (CUB); L 5–6	Did not advance				17

== Athletics ==
=== Track and road events ===
Event	Athletes	Heats		Semifinal		Final	
Event	Athletes	Time	Rank	Time	Rank	Time	Rank
100 m	Carlos Rafael Jorge	10.43	2nd Q	10.30	2nd Q	10.26	4th
200 m	Yoel Tapia	20.95	2nd Q	20.84	6th	Did not advance	
400 m	Arismendy Peguero			45.94	3rd q	45.72	6th
400 m	Luguelín Santos			45.41 PB	2nd Q	44.71 PB	2nd place, silver medalist(s)
110 m hurdles	Carlos Rafael Jorge			13.80	5th Q	Did not advance	
400 m hurdles	Winder Cuevas			50.12 SB	2nd Q	49.20 PB	4th
400 m hurdles	Felix Sánchez			50.22	2nd Q	48.85	3rd place, bronze medalist(s)
4 × 400 m relay	Arismendy Peguero; Luguelín Santos; Yoel Tapia; Gustavo Cuesta			3:06.33	3rd Q	3:00.44 SB	2nd place, silver medalist(s)

=== Track and road events ===
Event	Athletes	Semifinal		Final	
Event	Athletes	Time	Rank	Time	Rank
100 m	Fany Chalas	DNS		Did not advance	
100 m	Mariely Sánchez	11.57 PB	3rd q	11.49 PB	5th
200 m	Mariely Sánchez	23.45 PB	2nd Q	23.02 PB	3rd place, bronze medalist(s)
400 m	Raysa Sánchez	53.08	4th q	52.86	8th
100 m hurdles	LaVonne Idlette	13.40	4th q	13.62	8th
400 m hurdles	Yolanda Osana	57.86	3rd Q	57.08 PB	3rd place, bronze medalist(s)
4 × 400 m relay	Fany Chalas; Francia Manzanillo; Yolanda Osana; Raysa Sánchez; Mariely Sánchez			DNS	

=== Field events ===
Event	Athletes	Semifinal		Final	
Event	Athletes	Result	Rank	Result	Rank
Triple jump	Ana José			12.80 m.	10th

=== Combined events ===
Decathlon	Event	Francia Manzanillo		
Decathlon	Event	Results	Points	Rank
	100 m hurdles	14.12 PB	961	4th
	High jump	1.59 m.	724	9th
	Shot put	12.89 m. PB	720	4th
	200 m	24.87	899	5th
	Long jump	5.40 m.	671	10th
	Javelin throw	46.73 m. PB	797	1st
	800 m	2:16.46 PB	872	3rd
Final			5644	3rd place, bronze medalist(s)

== Badminton ==
The Dominican Republic has qualified two male and female athletes in the individual and team badminton competitions.

Men

Athlete	Event	First round	Second round	Third round	Quarterfinals	Semifinals	Final	Rank
Athlete	Event	Opposition Result	Opposition Result	Opposition Result	Opposition Result	Opposition Result	Opposition Result	Rank
Alberto Raposo	Men's singles	BYE	E Mujica (CHI); W 2–0 (21–13, 21–14)	D Paiola (BRA); L 0–2 (7–21, 8–21)	Did not advance			
Nelson Javier	Men's singles	BYE	S Teran (ECU); W 2–1 (17–21, 21–11, 21–12)	S Wojcikiewicz (CAN); L 0–2 (13–21, 16–21)	Did not advance			
Nelson Javier; Alberto Raposo	Men's doubles			O Guerrero (CUB); R Toledo (CUB); L 0–2 (11–21, 17–21)	Did not advance			

Women

Athlete	Event	First round	Second round	Third round	Quarterfinals	Semifinals	Final	Rank
Athlete	Event	Opposition Result	Opposition Result	Opposition Result	Opposition Result	Opposition Result	Opposition Result	Rank
Orosameli Cabrera	Women's singles	BYE	A de León (GUA); L 0–2 (12–21, 8–21)	Did not advance				
Veronica Vivieca	Women's singles	L Vicente (BRA); L 1–2 (14–21, 21–19, 24–26)	Did not advance					
Orosameli Cabrera; Veronica Vivieca	Women's doubles		G Araujo (VEN); J Quintero (VEN); W 2–0 (21–13, 21–9)	M Haldane (JAM); K Wynter (JAM); W 2–1 (17–21, 21–17, 21–14)	A Bruce (CAN); M Li (CAN); L 0–2 (4–21, 5–21)	Did not advance		

Mixed

Athlete	Event	First round	Second round	Quarterfinals	Semifinals	Final	Rank
Athlete	Event	Opposition Result	Opposition Result	Opposition Result	Opposition Result	Opposition Result	Rank
Nelson Javier; Veronica Vivieca	Mixed doubles	L Camacho (VEN); L Tovar (VEN); W 2–0 (21–14, 21–14)	H Bach (USA); P Obañana (USA); L 0–2 (10–21, 7–21)	Did not advance			
Alberto Raposo; Orosameli Cabrera	Mixed doubles	B Valentín (PUR); D Santana (PUR); L 1–2 (24–22, 19–21, 12–21)	Did not advance				

== Baseball ==
The Dominican Republic has qualified a baseball team of twenty athletes to participate.

Team

- Mario Alvarez Ysabel
- Jose Campusano Solano
- Silvio Castillo
- Bernabet Castro Moronta
- Dionis Cesar Alvarez
- Rafael Cruz Baez
- Francisco Cruceta
- Cristopher De La Cruz
- Logan Duran
- Bartolomé Fortunato
- Alexis Gómez
- Angel Gonzalez
- Francisco Hernandez
- Runelvys Hernández
- Henry Mateo
- Victor Mendez Aquino
- Jacobo Meque
- Arnaldo Munos
- Roberto Novoa
- Willis Otáñez
- Juan Antonio Pena
- Juan Miguel Richardson
- Danilo Sanchez Lopez
- Darío Veras

Standings

Pos	Team	W	L	RF	RA	RD	PCT	GB	Qualification
1	Mexico (H)	3	0	8	5	+3	1.000	—	Advance to Semifinals
2	United States	2	1	33	5	+28	.667	1	Advance to Semifinals
3	Dominican Republic	1	2	12	29	−17	.333	2	
4	Panama	0	3	7	21	−14	.000	3	

(H) Hosts

Results

October 20, 2011; 14:00	Dominican Republic	2 – 20	United States	Pan American Baseball Stadium, Lagos de Moreno
October 20, 2011; 14:00		http://200.57.183.69/ENG/BB/BBR173A_BBM40040010100002ENG.htm		Pan American Baseball Stadium, Lagos de Moreno

October 21, 2011; 19:00	Mexico	3 – 2	Dominican Republic	Pan American Baseball Stadium, Lagos de Moreno
October 21, 2011; 19:00		Boxscore		Pan American Baseball Stadium, Lagos de Moreno

October 22, 2011; 14:00	Panama	6 – 8	Dominican Republic	Pan American Baseball Stadium, Lagos de Moreno
October 22, 2011; 14:00		http://200.57.183.69/ENG/BB/BBR173A_BBM40040010100005ENG.htm		Pan American Baseball Stadium, Lagos de Moreno

=== Fifth place match ===
October 25, 2011; 10:00	Venezuela	7 – 14	Dominican Republic	Pan American Baseball Stadium, Lagos de Moreno
October 25, 2011; 10:00		Boxscore		Pan American Baseball Stadium, Lagos de Moreno

2011 Pan American Games 5th

Dominican Republic

== Basketball ==
Men

Team

- Juan Coronado
- Elpidio Fortuna
- Elys Guzman Garcia
- Luis Guzmán
- Víctor Liz
- Luis Martinez
- Jack Michael Martínez
- Cristian Montas
- Juan Pablo Montas
- Kelvin Peña
- Edward Santana
- Ricardo Soliver

Standings

Pos	Team	Pld	W	L	PF	PA	PD	Pts	Qualification
1	United States	3	2	1	231	206	+25	5 (Note: United States 77–76 Dominican Republic)	Advance to Semifinals
2	Dominican Republic	3	2	1	231	194	+37	5	Advance to Semifinals
3	Brazil	3	1	2	206	238	−32	4 (Note: Brazil 80–71 Uruguay)	
4	Uruguay	3	1	2	214	244	−30	4	

Notes:

Results

October 26
17:30

Report

United States	77–76	Dominican Republic
Scoring by quarter: 20–20, 9–17, 25–20, 23–19
Pts: Thomas 15; Rebs: Thomas 16; Asts: Thomas, Dentmon 3		Pts: Martínez 31; Rebs: Martínez 10; Asts: Soliver 5

CODE Dome, Guadalajara
Referees: Dorame (MEX), Kenyon (CAN), Dueñas (COL)

October 27
17:30

Report

Uruguay	55–69	Dominican Republic
Scoring by quarter: 15–17, 19–19, 12–13, 9–20
Pts: Osimani 16; Rebs: Osimani 8 Asts: Osimani 4		Pts: Coronado Gil 17; Rebs: Martínez 21; Asts: Martínez 4

CODE Dome, Guadalajara
Referees: Aluz (ARG), Ramos (MEX), Vazquez (PUR)

October 28
13:00

Report

Dominican Republic	85–77	Brazil
Scoring by quarter: 20–19, 13–21, 23–29, 29–8
Pts: Martínez 22; Rebs: Martínez 9 Asts: Soliver 3		Pts: Machado 17; Rebs: da Rosa, Giovannoni 5 Asts: Machado, Santos 5

CODE Dome, Guadalajara
Referees: Vazquez (PUR), Aluz (ARG), Kenyon (CAN)

Semifinals

October 29
20:00

Report

Puerto Rico	85–77	Dominican Republic
Scoring by quarter: 23–18, 20–19, 23–16, 19–24
Pts: Barea 22; Rebs: Balkman 7 Asts: Barea 5		Pts: Martínez 20; Rebs: Martínez 8 Asts: Soliver 4

CODE Dome, Guadalajara
Referees: Benito (BRA), Donnelly (CAN), Fernandez (ARG)

Bronze-medal match

October 30
10:30

Report

Dominican Republic	92–94	United States
Scoring by quarter: 30–28, 21–17, 17–23, 26–24
Pts: Garcia 25; Rebs: Two players, 9 Asts: Liz 7		Pts: Thomas 14; Rebs: Lewis 7 Asts: Dentmon 5

CODE Dome, Guadalajara
Referees: Vazquez (PUR), Vazquez (URU), Dorame (MEX)

2011 Pan American Games 4th

Dominican Republic

== Beach volleyball ==
The Dominican Republic has qualified a men's team in the beach volleyball competition.

Men

Athlete	Event	Preliminary round			Quarterfinals	Semifinals	Finals
Athlete	Event	Opposition Score	Opposition Score	Opposition Score	Opposition Score	Opposition Score	Opposition Score
Yewddys Pérez; Germán Recio	Men	Sergio Reynaldo Gonzalez (CUB); Karell Piña (CUB); L 23-25, 17-21	Esteban Escobar (CRC); Bryan Monge (CRC); W 24-22, 21-18	Alison Cerutti (BRA); Emanuel Rego (BRA); L 13-21, 12-21	Did not advance		

== Bowling ==
The Dominican Republic has qualified two male and two female athletes in the individual and team bowling competitions.

=== Men ===
Individual

Athlete	Event	Qualification															Eighth Finals	Quarterfinals	Semifinals	Finals	
Athlete	Event	Block 1 (games 1–6)						Block 2 (games 7–12)						Total	Average	Rank	Eighth Finals	Quarterfinals	Semifinals	Finals	
Athlete	Event	1	2	3	4	5	6	7	8	9	10	11	12	Total	Average	Rank	Opposition Scores	Opposition Scores	Opposition Scores	Opposition Scores	Rank
Manuel Fernández	Men's individual	246	210	200	258	198	248	168	188	211	193	244	244	2608	217.3	6th	Ernesto Franco (MEX); W 678 – 582	Francisco Colon (PUR); W 665 – 625	Chris Barnes (USA); L 556 – 641 (bronze)	Did not advance	
Rolando Sebelen	Men's individual	224	235	185	216	187	202	240	167	212	186	212	179	2445	203.8	15th	William David O´Neill (USA); L 561-718	Did not advance			

Pairs

Athlete	Event	Block 1 (games 1–6)								Block 2 (games 7–12)								Grand total	Final rank
Athlete	Event	1	2	3	4	5	6	Total	Average	7	8	9	10	11	12	Total	Average	Grand total	Final rank
Manuel Fernández; Rolando Sebelen	Men's pairs	233	183	159	192	178	214	1159	193.2	200	209	191	194	177	213	1184	197.3	4739	8th
Manuel Fernández; Rolando Sebelen	Men's pairs	207	182	159	184	164	216	1112	185.3	266	170	204	181	228	235	1284	214.0	4739	8th

=== Women ===
Individual

Athlete	Event	Qualification															Eighth Finals	Quarterfinals	Semifinals	Finals	
Athlete	Event	Block 1 (games 1–6)						Block 2 (games 7–12)						Total	Average	Rank	Eighth Finals	Quarterfinals	Semifinals	Finals	
Athlete	Event	1	2	3	4	5	6	7	8	9	10	11	12	Total	Average	Rank	Opposition Scores	Opposition Scores	Opposition Scores	Opposition Scores	Rank
Aura Guerra	Women's individual	200	215	223	175	256	215	198	175	148	200	183	224	2412	201.0	6th	Miriam Aseret Zetter (MEX); W 578 – 539	Karen Marcano (VEN); L 595-652	Did not advance		
Maria Vilas	Women's individual	167	171	173	161	185	167	149	166	171	169	181	180	2040	170.0	27th	Did not advance				

Pairs

Athlete	Event	Block 1 (games 1–6)								Block 2 (games 7–12)								Grand total	Final rank
Athlete	Event	1	2	3	4	5	6	Total	Average	7	8	9	10	11	12	Total	Average	Grand total	Final rank
Aura Guerra; Maria Vilas	Women's pairs	141	181	184	135	231	190	1062	177.0	212	174	205	178	186	169	1124	187.3	4586	6th
Aura Guerra; Maria Vilas	Women's pairs	211	176	234	237	213	204	1275	212.5	159	157	149	193	276	191	1125	187.5	4586	6th

== Boxing ==
The Dominican Republic has qualified seven athletes in the 49 kg, 52 kg, 56 kg, 64 kg, 69 kg, 81 kg, and 91 kg men's categories and one athlete in the 75 kg women's category.

=== Men ===
Athlete	Event	Preliminaries	Quarterfinals	Semifinals	Final
Athlete	Event	Opposition Result	Opposition Result	Opposition Result	Opposition Result
Juan Medina	Light flyweight		Carlos Eduardo Quipo (ECU); W 23 – 13	Joselito Velázquez (MEX); L 22 – 32 (bronze)	Did not advance
Dagoberto Aguero	Flyweight		Eddi Valenzuela (ESA); W 20 – 13	Juliao Henriques Neto (BRA); W 21 – 11	Robeisy Eloy Ramirez (CUB); L 10-24 (silver)
Luis Salazar	Bantamweight		Lazaro Jorge Alvarez (CUB); L 5-18	Did not advance	
Wellinton Arias	Lightweight		Robson Conceição (BRA); L 11-18	Did not advance	
Ricardo García	Light welterweight	Éverton Lopes (BRA); L RSCH R2 3:00	Did not advance		
Raúl Sánchez	Welterweight	Myke de Carvalho (BRA); L 18-23	Did not advance		
Junior Castillo	Middleweight	Rowain Christoper (DMA); W KO R1 3:00	Jaime Jorge Cortez (ECU); L 8 – 15 (bronze)	Did not advance	
Félix Varela	Light heavyweight		Yamaguchi Florentino (BRA); L RSC R1 3:00	Did not advance	
Manuel Mariñez	Heavyweight	Steven Couture (CAN); L 6 – 18	Did not advance		
Cristian Cabrera	Super Heavyweight		Ytalo Antonio Perea (ECU); L 10 – 20	Did not advance	

=== Women ===
Athlete	Event	Preliminaries	Quarterfinals	Semifinals	Final
Athlete	Event	Opposition Result	Opposition Result	Opposition Result	Opposition Result
Yenebier Guillén	Light heavyweight		Tiffany Latriece Reddick (ISV); W RSC R1 3:00	Roseli Feitosa (BRA); W 21-12	Mary Elizabeth Spencer (CAN); L 11-15 (silver)

== Cycling ==
=== Road Cycling ===
Men

Athlete	Event	Time	Rank
Wendy Cruz	Road race	3:45:06	22nd
Nelson Sanchez	Road race	3:50:58	37th
Jorge Pérez	Road race	DNF	

=== Track cycling ===
Athlete	Event	Flying Lap Time Rank	Points Race Points Rank	Elimination Race Rank	Ind Pursuit Time	Scratch Race Rank	Time Trial Time	Final Rank
Jorge Pérez	Men	13.666; 8th	76; 2nd	3rd	4:41.123; 8th	-2; 8th	1:05.701; 7th	36; 5th

== Diving ==
=== Men ===
Athlete(s)	Event	Preliminary		Final	
Athlete(s)	Event	Points	Rank	Points	Rank
Argenis Alvarez	3 m springboard	273.10	14th	Did not advance	

== Equestrian ==
=== Dressage ===
Athlete	Horse	Event	Grand Prix		Grand Prix Special		Grand Prix Freestyle		Final score	Rank
Athlete	Horse	Event	Score	Rank	Score	Rank	Score	Rank	Final score	Rank
Yvonne Losos de Muñiz	Dondolo Las Marismas	Individual	71.369	6th	70.342	12th	70.250	12th	70.296	11th
Samira Uemura	Royal Affair	Individual	67.079	16th	62.500	23rd	Did not advance			
George Fernandez Diaz	Caracol XXIV	Individual	63.316	32nd	Did not advance					
Yvonne Losos de Muñiz; Samira Uemura; George Fernandez Diaz	Dondolo Las Marismas; Royal Affair; Caracol XXIV	Team	67.255	6th					67.255	6th

=== Individual jumping ===
Athlete	Horse	Event	Ind. 1st Qualifier		Ind. 2nd Qualifier			Ind. 3rd Qualifier			Ind. Final					
Athlete	Horse	Event	Ind. 1st Qualifier		Ind. 2nd Qualifier			Ind. 3rd Qualifier			Round A		Round B		Total	
Athlete	Horse	Event	Penalties	Rank	Penalties	Total	Rank	Penalties	Total	Rank	Penalties	Rank	Penalties	Rank	Penalties	Rank
Héctor Florentino	Ultimo	Individual	13.36	49th	5.00	18.36	36th	4.00	22.36	29th	9.00	23rdt	8.00	20th	39.36	20th

== Fencing ==
The Dominican Republic has qualified one athlete each in the women's individual épee and foil competitions, and one pair of athletes in the women's individual and team sabre competitions.

=== Women ===
Event	Athlete	Round of Poules		Round of 16	Quarterfinals	Semifinals	Final
Event	Athlete	Result	Seed	Opposition Score	Opposition Score	Opposition Score	Opposition Score
Individual épée	Violeta Ramírez	3 V – 2 D	6th Q	Sherraine Schalm (CAN); L 7-15	Did not advance		
Individual foil	Carmen Nuñez	1 V – 4 D	12th Q	Alanna Goldie (CAN); L 7-15	Did not advance		
Individual sabre	Rossy Félix	2 V – 3 D	11th Q	Sandra Sassine (CAN); L 13-15	Did not advance		
Individual sabre	Maybelline Johnnson	2 V – 3 D	14th Q	Eileen Grench (PAN); L 6-15	Did not advance		
Team sabre	Maybelline Johnnson; Rossy Félix; Heyddys Valentín				Argentina; W 45-44	United States; L 12-45	Bronze medal match: Venezuela; L 44-45

== Gymnastics ==
=== Artistic ===
The Dominican Republic has qualified one male and one female athlete in the artistic gymnastics competition.

Men

Individual qualification & Team Finals

Athlete	Event	Apparatus						Qualification		Final	
Athlete	Event	Floor	Pommel horse	Rings	Vault	Parallel bars	Horizontal bar	Total	Rank	Total	Rank
Jesus De Leon	Ind qualification	10.600	11.300	12.400	15.250		12.400	61.950	38th		

Women
Individual qualification & Team Finals

Athlete	Event	Apparatus				Qualification		Final	
Athlete	Event	Vault	Uneven bars	Balance beam	Floor	Total	Rank	Total	Rank
Yamilet Peña	Ind qualification	14.150	11.150	12.500	12.525	50.325	25th		

Individual Finals

Athlete	Event	Apparatus				Final	
Athlete	Event	Vault	Uneven bars	Balance beam	Floor	Total	Rank
Yamilet Peña	Individual all-around	14.775	10.575	10.300	12.625	48.275	18th
Yamilet Peña	Individual vault	6.950				6.950	8th

== Handball ==
Men

Team

- Julio Almeida
- Franalbert Aybar
- Michael Bravet
- Domingo Caraballo
- Kelvin de León
- Leony de León
- Geraldo Díaz
- Elvin Fis
- Pablo Jacobo
- Dioris Mateo
- Carlos Miraval
- Luis Sanlate
- Juan Tapia
- Erinson Tavares
- Luis Taveras

Standings

Pos	Team	Pld	W	D	L	GF	GA	GD	Pts	Qualification
1	Argentina	3	3	0	0	95	55	+40	6	Semifinals
2	Dominican Republic	3	2	0	1	77	79	−2	4	Semifinals
3	Mexico (H)	3	1	0	2	78	93	−15	2	5th–8th place semifinals
4	United States	3	0	0	3	73	96	−23	0	5th–8th place semifinals

Source: Guadalajara 2011
Rules for classification: 1) points; 2) head-to-head points; 3) head-to-head goal difference; 4) head-to-head goals scored; 5) goal difference; 6) goals scored; 7) draw.
(H) Hosts

Results

October 16; 18:00	Dominican Republic	27 – 22	United States	San Rafael Gymnasium; Referees: Martin, Pellerin (CAN)
October 16; 18:00	two players, 7	Report	Axelsson, 8	San Rafael Gymnasium; Referees: Martin, Pellerin (CAN)

October 18; 18:00	Mexico	29 – 30	Dominican Republic	San Rafael Gymnasium; Referees: Sabroso, Raluy (ESP)
October 18; 18:00	Villalobos, 7	Report	De León, 10	San Rafael Gymnasium; Referees: Sabroso, Raluy (ESP)

October 20; 18:00	Argentina	28 – 20	Dominican Republic	San Rafael Gymnasium; Referees: Sabroso, Raluy (ESP)
October 20; 18:00	two players, 6	Report	Miraval, 6	San Rafael Gymnasium; Referees: Sabroso, Raluy (ESP)

Semifinals

October 22; 10:00	Brazil	41 – 17	Dominican Republic	San Rafael Gymnasium; Referees: Minore, Marina (ARG)
October 22; 10:00	Chiuffa, 6	Report	four players, 3	San Rafael Gymnasium; Referees: Minore, Marina (ARG)

Bronze medal match

October 24; 17:30	Dominican Republic	24 – 27	Chile	San Rafael Gymnasium; Referees: Marina, Minore (ARG)
October 24; 17:30	Miraval, 8	Report	two players, 5	San Rafael Gymnasium; Referees: Marina, Minore (ARG)

2011 Pan American Games 4th

Dominican Republic

Women

Team

- Mariela Andino
- Mariela Céspedes
- Mari Colón
- Cari Dominguez
- Mileidys García
- Judith Granado
- Crisleydi Hernández
- Carolina López
- Indiana Mateo
- Nancy Peña
- Johanna Pimentel
- Jessica Sierra
- Suleidy Suárez
- Yacaira Tejeda
- Débora Torreira

Standings

Pos	Team	Pld	W	D	L	GF	GA	GD	Pts	Qualification
1	Brazil	3	3	0	0	125	43	+82	6	Semifinals
2	Dominican Republic	3	1	1	1	75	82	−7	3	Semifinals
3	Uruguay	3	1	1	1	75	91	−16	3	5th–8th place semifinals
4	United States	3	0	0	3	60	119	−59	0	5th–8th place semifinals

Source: Guadalajara 2011
Rules for classification: 1) points; 2) head-to-head points; 3) head-to-head goal difference; 4) head-to-head goals scored; 5) goal difference; 6) goals scored; 7) draw.

Results

October 15; 18:00	Dominican Republic	24–24	Uruguay	San Rafael Gymnasium; Referees: Marina, Minroe (ARG)
October 15; 18:00	Two players, 6	Report	Fynn, 7	San Rafael Gymnasium; Referees: Marina, Minroe (ARG)

October 17; 13:00	United States	26–33	Dominican Republic	San Rafael Gymnasium; Referees: Martin, Pellerin (CAN)
October 17; 13:00	Borg, 10	Report	Granado, 10	San Rafael Gymnasium; Referees: Martin, Pellerin (CAN)

October 19; 13:00	Brazil	32–18	Dominican Republic	San Rafael Gymnasium; Referees: Martin, Pellerin (CAN)
October 19; 13:00	Da Silva, 8	Report	Granado, 6	San Rafael Gymnasium; Referees: Martin, Pellerin (CAN)

Semifinals

October 21; 20:00	Argentina	19–18	Dominican Republic	San Rafael Gymnasium; Referees: Raluy, Sabroso (ESP)
October 21; 20:00	Tagliavini, 3	Report	Granado, 8	San Rafael Gymnasium; Referees: Raluy, Sabroso (ESP)

Bronze medal match

October 23; 17:30	Mexico	31–33 (AET)	Dominican Republic	San Rafael Gymnasium; Referees: Pinto, Meneses (BRA)
October 23; 17:30	Flores 7	Report	Peña 10	San Rafael Gymnasium; Referees: Pinto, Meneses (BRA)

2011 Pan American Games Bronze medal

Dominican Republic

== Karate ==
The Dominican Republic has qualified four athletes in the 60 kg, 67 kg, 75 kg, and 84 kg men's categories and four athletes in the 50 kg, 55 kg, 61 kg and 68 kg women's categories.

=== Men ===
Athlete	Event	Round robin (Pool A/B)			Semifinals	Final
Athlete	Event	Match 1	Match 2	Match 3	Semifinals	Final
Athlete	Event	Opposition Result	Opposition Result	Opposition Result	Opposition Result	Opposition Result
Norberto Sosa	Men's -60 kg	Douglas Brose (BRA); L PTS 0:2	Brian Merterl (USA); W PTS 2:0	Dennis Novo (CUB); L PTS 0:5	Miguel Soffia (CHI); W PTS 2:1	Andrés Rendón (COL); L PTS 0:8 (silver)
Delvis Ferreras	Men's -67 kg	Daniel Viveros (ECU); HKW 2:2	Manuel Araujo (MEX); HKW 0:0	Dennis Lazo (PER); W PTS 5:0	Did not advance	
Dionicio Gustavo	Men's -75 kg	Esteban Espinoza (ECU); W PTS 1:0	Aaron Perez (ESA); HKW 0:0	Thomas Scott (USA); HKW 0:0	David Dubo (CHI); W PTS 2:1	Thomas Scott (USA); W HAN 2:2 (gold)
Jorge Perez	Men's -84 kg	Jose Hector Paz (ESA); W PTS 7:2	Edwin Assereto (PER); W PTS 3:1	Cesar Herrera (VEN); L PTS 4:8	Homero Morales (MEX); W PTS 5:5	Cesar Herrera (VEN); L 5-7 (silver)

=== Women ===
Athlete	Event	Round robin (Pool A/B)			Semifinals	Final
Athlete	Event	Match 1	Match 2	Match 3	Semifinals	Final
Athlete	Event	Opposition Result	Opposition Result	Opposition Result	Opposition Result	Opposition Result
Johanni Sierra	Women's -68 kg	Yadira Lira (MEX); L PTS 0:1	Cheryl Murphy (USA); W PTS 2:1	Yoly Guillen (VEN); L PTS 0:2	Did not advance	
Ana Montilla	Women's -61 kg	Bertha Gutierrez (MEX); L PTS 0:1	Maria Acevedo (ARG); W PTS 2:0	Marisca Verspaget (AHO); L PTS 1:2	Did not advance	
Ana Villanueva	Women's -50 kg	Dougmay Camacaro (VEN); W PTS 2:0	Laura Contreras (MEX); L PTS 0-1	Cheili Gonzalez (GUA); W PTS 2:0	Jessica Candido (BRA); W PTS 1:0	Gabriela Bruna (CHI); W 1:0 (gold)
Karina Diaz	Women's -55 kg	Jacqueline Factos (ECU); HKW 2:2	Yanelsis Gongora (MEX); HKW 3:3	Valéria Kumizaki (BRA); W PTS 1:0	Jessy Reyes (CHI); W PTS 2:1	Shannon Nishi (USA); L PTS1:1 (silver)

== Modern pentathlon ==
The Dominican Republic has qualified two male pentathletes.

=== Men ===
Athlete	Fencing (épée one touch)			Swimming (200m freestyle)			Riding (show jumping)			Combined			Total points	Final rank
Athlete	Results	Rank	MP points	Time	Rank	MP points	Penalties	Rank	MP points	Time	Rank	MP points	Total points	Final rank
Julio Benjamin	14V – 10D	6th	892	2:19:98	19th	1124	368.00	22nd	832	14:33:07	21st	1508	4356	21st
Yacil Valera	15V – 9D	5th	928	2:23:93	21st	1076	20.00	11th	1180	13:46:86	20th	1696	4880	18th

== Racquetball ==
The Dominican Republic has qualified two male and two female athletes in the racquetball competition.

Men

Athlete	Event	Preliminary round (2 or 3)	Round of 32	Round of 16	Quarterfinals	Semifinals	Final
Athlete	Event	Opposition Score	Opposition Score	Opposition Score	Opposition Score	Opposition Score	Opposition Score
Luis Pérez	Singles	Michael Green (CAN); W 3 – 15, 15 – 10, 11 – 7 Carlos Keller (BOL); L 4 – 15, 6 – 15; Teobaldo Fumero (CRC); W 15 – 13, 15 – 11	Jose Ugalde (ECU); W 15 – 12, 11 – 15, 11 – 8	Álvaro Beltrán (MEX); L 3 – 15, 3 – 15	Did not advance		
Ramón de León	Singles	Vincent Gagnon (CAN); L 3 – 15, 4 – 15; Alejandro Herrera (COL); L 7 – 15, 3 – 15; César Castro (VEN); L 6 – 15, 2 – 15	Michael Green (CAN); L 7 – 15, 3 – 15	Did not advance			
Ramón de León; Luis Pérez	Doubles	Daniel Maggi (Argentina) Shai Manzuri (ARG); L 11 – 15, 11 – 15; Timothy Landeryou (Canada) Kristofer Odegard (CAN); L 1 – 15, 8 – 15; Raul Banegas (Honduras) Selvin Cruz (HON); L 11 – 15, 15 – 13, 11 – 2		Francisco J. Gomez (Colombia) Juan C. Torres (COL); L 15 – 10, 2 – 15, 6 – 11	Did not advance		
Ramón de León; Luis Pérez	Team				Ecuador; L 0 – 2, 0 – 2	Did not advance	

Women

Athlete	Event	Preliminary round (2 or 3)	Round of 16	Quarterfinals	Semifinals	Final
Athlete	Event	Opposition Score	Opposition Score	Opposition Score	Opposition Score	Opposition Score
Claudine Garcia	Singles	María Vargas (BOL); L 15 – 10, 15 – 13; Cheryl Gudinas (USA); L 11 – 15, 15 – 14, 2 – 11; Marie Gomar (GUA); W 15 – 8, 15 – 1	Maria P. Muñoz (ECU); L 4 – 15, 10 – 15	Did not advance		
Claudine Garcia; Yira Portes	Doubles	Angela Grisar (Chile) Carla Muñoz (CHI); L 15 – 3, 8 – 15, 5 – 11; Paola Longoria (Mexico) Samantha Salas (MEX); L 1 – 15, 0 – 15		Rhonda Rajsich (United States) Aimee Ruiz (USA); L 2 – 15, 6 – 15	Did not advance	
Claudine Garcia; Yira Portes	Team			United States; L 0 – 2, 0 – 2	Did not advance	

== Sailing ==
The Dominican Republic has qualified one boat and one athlete in the sailing competition.

=== Men ===
Athlete	Event	Race											Net points	Final rank
Athlete	Event	1	2	3	4	5	6	7	8	9	10	M	Net points	Final rank
Raul Aguayo	Laser	1	8	2	8	10	12	6	11	14 (OCS)	10		68.0	8th

== Shooting ==
Men

Event	Athlete	Qualification		Final	
Event	Athlete	Score	Rank	Score	Rank
10 m air pistol	Josue Hernandez	553-12x	26th	Did not advance	
10 m air pistol	Manuel Figuereo	550- 8x	28th	Did not advance	
10 metre air rifle	Hosman Duran	519-12x	26th	Did not advance	
25 metre rapid fire pistol	Manuel Figuereo	DNS		Did not advance	
25 metre rapid fire pistol	Josue Hernandez	DNS		Did not advance	
50 metre pistol	Josue Hernandez	510- 1x	26th	Did not advance	
50 metre pistol	Manuel Figuereo	512- 5x	25th	Did not advance	
50 metre rifle prone	Hosman Duran	576-23x	22nd	Did not advance	
50 metre rifle three positions	Hosman Duran	1051- 24x	22nd	Did not advance	
Trap	Eduardo Lorenzo	119	5th Q	140	5th
Trap	Sergio Piñero	119	6th Q	139	6th
Double Trap	Henry Tejeda	136	3rd Q	179	6th
Double Trap	Manuel Morales	129	8th	Did not advance	
Skeet	Julio Dujarric	118 +5	7th	Did not advance	
Skeet	Eddy Paulino	112	20th	Did not advance	

Women

Event	Athlete	Qualification		Final	
Event	Athlete	Score	Rank	Score	Rank
10 m air pistol	Rosaria Piña	349- 3x	24th Q	Did not advance	
10 m air pistol	Jeniffer Reyes	363- 2x	20th	Did not advance	
10 metre air rifle	Maziel Gonzalez	363- 7x	29th	Did not advance	
25 metre pistol	Rosario Piña	539- 7x	20th Q	Did not advance	
25 metre pistol	Jeniffer Reyes	527- 6x	23rd	Did not advance	
50 metre rifle three positions	Maziel Gonzalez	539-11x	22nd	Did not advance	

== Softball ==
The Dominican Republic has qualified a team to participate. The team consisted of 17 athletes.

Team

- Kenia Benzant Perez
- Vitalia De La Rosa
- Dharianna Famlia Furcal
- Geraldina Feliz Urbaez
- Altagracia Garcia
- Josefina Mercedes Henriguez
- Geovanny Nunez Garcia
- Hanna Penna
- Erika Perez Cuello
- Rosaury Perez Cuevas
- Maribel Pie Contreras
- Danelis Ramirez
- Eduarda Roche
- Rosangela Rodriguez Morales
- Lidizeth Soto Ramirez
- Aureliza Tejada Aquino
- Ana Ulloa

Standings

Qualified for the semifinals
Eliminated

All times are Central Daylight Time (UTC−5)

Rank	Team	W	L	RS	RA
1	United States	7	0	54	6
2	Cuba	5	2	28	13
3	Venezuela	5	2	31	20
4	Canada	5	2	46	23
5	Dominican Republic	2	5	22	37
6	Mexico	2	5	18	37
7	Puerto Rico	2	5	27	42
8	Argentina	0	7	4	59

Results

October 17, 2011; 9:00	Dominican Republic	2 – 3	Puerto Rico	Pan American Softball Stadium, Guadalajara; Attendance: 350
October 17, 2011; 9:00		http://200.57.183.69/ENG/SO/SOR173A_SOW40040010100001ENG.htm		Pan American Softball Stadium, Guadalajara; Attendance: 350

October 17, 2011; 20:00	Mexico	1 – 3	Dominican Republic	Pan American Softball Stadium, Guadalajara; Attendance: 500
October 17, 2011; 20:00		http://200.57.183.69/ENG/SO/SOR173A_SOW40040010100002ENG.htm		Pan American Softball Stadium, Guadalajara; Attendance: 500

October 18, 2011; 13:00	United States	10 – 0	Dominican Republic	Pan American Softball Stadium, Guadalajara; Attendance: 200
October 18, 2011; 13:00		http://200.57.183.69/ENG/SO/SOR173A_SOW40040010100006ENG.htm		Pan American Softball Stadium, Guadalajara; Attendance: 200

October 19, 2011; 11:00	Argentina	1 – 11	Dominican Republic	Pan American Softball Stadium, Guadalajara; Attendance: 183
October 19, 2011; 11:00		http://200.57.183.69/ENG/SO/SOR173A_SOW40040010100004ENG.htm		Pan American Softball Stadium, Guadalajara; Attendance: 183

October 20, 2011; 11:00	Venezuela	3 – 10	Dominican Republic	Pan American Softball Stadium, Guadalajara; Attendance: 150
October 20, 2011; 11:00		http://200.57.183.69/ENG/SO/SOR173A_SOW40040010100003ENG.htm		Pan American Softball Stadium, Guadalajara; Attendance: 150

October 21, 2011; 9:00	Cuba	6 – 1	Dominican Republic	Pan American Softball Stadium, Guadalajara; Attendance: 150
October 21, 2011; 9:00		http://200.57.183.69/ENG/SO/SOR173A_SOW40040010100005ENG.htm		Pan American Softball Stadium, Guadalajara; Attendance: 150

October 21, 2011; 11:00	Canada	6 – 2	Dominican Republic	Pan American Softball Stadium, Guadalajara; Attendance: 185
October 21, 2011; 11:00		http://200.57.183.69/ENG/SO/SOR173A_SOW40040010100007ENG.htm		Pan American Softball Stadium, Guadalajara; Attendance: 185

2011 Pan American Games 5th

Dominican Republic

== Swimming ==
Men

Event	Athletes	Heats		Final	
Event	Athletes	Time	Position	Time	Position
10 km marathon	Miguel Portes			2:19:18.0	17th

Women

Event	Athletes	Heats		Final	
Event	Athletes	Time	Position	Time	Position
100 m Backstroke	Laura Rodríguez	1:09.51	21st	Did not advance	
200 m Backstroke	Laura Rodríguez	2:27.26	15th QB	2:28.13	8th B
200 m Individual Medley	Laura Rodríguez	DNS		Did not advance	
400 m Individual Medley	Laura Rodríguez	5:22.28	18th	Did not advance	

== Table tennis ==
The Dominican Republic has qualified three male and three female athletes in the table tennis competition.

=== Men ===
Athlete	Event	Round robin			Round of 32	Round of 16	Quarterfinals	Semifinals	Final
Athlete	Event	Match 1	Match 2	Match 3	Round of 32	Round of 16	Quarterfinals	Semifinals	Final
Athlete	Event	Opposition Result	Opposition Result	Opposition Result	Opposition Result	Opposition Result	Opposition Result	Opposition Result	Opposition Result
Lin Ju	Singles	Mark Hazinski (USA); W 4-1	Pavel Oxamendi (CUB); W 4 – 1	Luis Mejía (ESA); W 4 – 0		Alexander Echavarria (COL); W 4 – 1	Marcelo Aguirre (PAR); W 4 – 0	Marcos Madrid (ESA); L 3-4 (bronze)	Did not advance
Emil Santos	Singles	Yiyong Fan (USA); L 0-4	Jude Okoh (MEX); W 4 – 3	Andy Pereira (CUB); L 0-4	Did not advance				
Juan Vila	Singles	Marcos Madrid (MEX) 'W 4 – 1	Jorge Campos (CUB); L 1-4	Pablo Tabachnik (ARG); L 2-4	Did not advance				
Lin Ju; Emil Santos; Juan Vila	Team	Brazil; L 0-3	Ecuador 'W 3-2				Mexico; L 1-3	Did not advance	

=== Women ===
Athlete	Event	Round robin			Round of 32	Round of 16	Quarterfinals	Semifinals	Final
Athlete	Event	Match 1	Match 2	Match 3	Round of 32	Round of 16	Quarterfinals	Semifinals	Final
Athlete	Event	Opposition Result	Opposition Result	Opposition Result	Opposition Result	Opposition Result	Opposition Result	Opposition Result	Opposition Result
Eva Brito	Singles	Paula Medina (USA); L 0-4	Sandra Orellana (ESA); W 4 – 1	Berta Rodríguez (CHI); L 1-4	Did not advance				
Johenny Valdez	Singles	Carelyn Cordero (PUR); W 4-3	Wang De Ying (ESA); W 4 – 1	Jessica Yamada (BRA); W 4-3		Fabiola Ramos (VEN); L 0-4	Did not advance		
Wu Xue	Singles	Leisy Jimenez (CUB); W 4-0	Erica Wu (USA); W 4 – 1	Mercedes Madrid (MEX); W 4-0		Caroline Kumahara (BRA); W 4 – 1	Paulina Vega (CHI); W 4-0	Ariel Hsing (USA); W 4 – 1	Zhang Mo (CAN); L 2-4 (silver)
Wu Xue; Johenny Valdez; Eva Brito	Team	United States; L 2-3	Peru; W 3-1				Canada; W 3-2	Colombia; W 3-1	Venezuela; W 3-2 (gold)

== Taekwondo ==
The Dominican Republic has qualified seven athletes (three male and four female).

Men

Athlete	Event	Round of 16	Quarterfinals	Semifinals	Final
Athlete	Event	Opposition Result	Opposition Result	Opposition Result	Opposition Result
Gabriel Mercedes	Flyweight (-58kg)		Jocelyn Addison (CAN); W 7 – 1	Frank Díaz (CUB); W 11 – 3	Damián Villa (MEX); W 8 – 7 (gold)
Jhohanny Jean	Lightweight (-68kg)	Erick Osornio (MEX); W 3 – 2	Federico Rosal (GUA); W 9 – 3	Terrence Jennings (USA); W 9 – 7	Angel Mora (CUB); W 8 – 7 (gold)
Wilkin Heredia	Middleweight (-80kg)	Carlos Liebig (CHI); L 10 – 12	Did not advance		

Women

Athlete	Event	Round of 16	Quarterfinals	Semifinals	Final
Athlete	Event	Opposition Result	Opposition Result	Opposition Result	Opposition Result
Yajaira Peguero	Flyweight (-49kg)	Katia Arakaki (BRA); L 6 – 7	Did not advance		
Disnansi Polanco	Lightweight (-57kg)	Nicole Palma (USA); L 7 – 8	Did not advance		
Katherine Rodríguez	Middleweight (-67kg)	Catalina Fierro (CHI); W 2 – 1	Carolina Acosta (MEX); W 3 – 1	Melissa Pagnotta (CAN); L 9 – 15 (bronze)	Did not advance
Deysy Montes de Oca	Heavyweight(+67kg)		Glenhis Hernández (CUB); L 0 – 12	Did not advance	

== Tennis ==
Men

Athlete	Event	1st Round	Round of 32	Round of 16	Quarterfinals	Semifinals	Final
Athlete	Event	Opposition Score	Opposition Score	Opposition Score	Opposition Score	Opposition Score	Opposition Score
Víctor Estrella	Singles		Marvin Rolle (BAH); W 6 – 2, 6 – 4	Daniel Garza (MEX); W 7 – 6(6), 6 – 3	Ricardo De Mello (BRA); W 6 – 3, 6 – 2	Robert Farah (COL); L 4 – 6, 4 – 6	Bronze medal match: Julio César Campozano (ECU); W 3 – 6, 7 – 5, 6 – 3 (bronze)
José Hernández	Singles	Julio César Campozano (ECU); L 4 – 6, 4 – 6	Did not advance				
José Hernández; Víctor Estrella	Doubles		Marcelo Arévalo (ESA); Rafael Arévalo (ESA); L 3 – 6, 7 – 6(2), [6-10]	Did not advance			

== Volleyball ==
Women

Team

- Cándida Arias
- Ana Yorkira Binet
- Dahiana Burgos
- Milagros Cabral
- Brenda Castillo
- Bethania de la Cruz
- Karla Echenique
- Lisvel Elisa Eve
- Niverka Marte
- Sidarka Núñez
- Prisilla Rivera
- Cindy Rondón

Standings

Pos	Team	Pld	W	L	Pts	SPW	SPL	SPR	SW	SL	SR	Qualification
1	Brazil	3	3	0	13	267	212	1.259	9	2	4.500	Semifinals
2	Cuba	3	2	1	10	259	236	1.097	7	4	1.750	Quarterfinals
3	Dominican Republic	3	1	2	5	283	304	0.931	5	8	0.625	Quarterfinals
4	Canada	3	0	3	2	209	266	0.786	2	9	0.222	

Results

Date		Score		Set 1	Set 2	Set 3	Set 4	Set 5	Total	Report
Oct 15	Brazil	3–1	Dominican Republic	25–22	21–25	25–16	25–20		96–83	
Oct 16	Cuba	3–1	Dominican Republic	25–23	21–25	25–20	25–16		96–84	
Oct 17	Dominican Republic	3–2	Canada	27–29	22–25	27–25	25–21	15–12	116–112	

Quarterfinals

Date		Score		Set 1	Set 2	Set 3	Set 4	Set 5	Total	Report
Oct 18	Puerto Rico	2–3	Dominican Republic	21–25	22–25	28–26	25–22	8–15	104–113	Report

Semifinals

Date		Score		Set 1	Set 2	Set 3	Set 4	Set 5	Total	Report
Oct 19	Brazil	3–0	Dominican Republic	25–19	25–18	25–23			75–60	Report

Bronze medal match

Date		Score		Set 1	Set 2	Set 3	Set 4	Set 5	Total	Report
Oct 20	United States	3–1	Dominican Republic	23–25	25–16	25–20	25–19		98–80	Report

2011 Pan American Games 4th

Dominican Republic

== Weightlifting ==
Athlete	Event	Snatch			Clean & jerk			Total	Rank
Athlete	Event	Attempt 1	Attempt 2	Attempt 3	Attempt 1	Attempt 2	Attempt 3	Total	Rank
José Peguero	Men's 62 kg	120	~~124~~	124	140	~~145~~	~~145~~	264	4th
Juan Peña	Men's 69 kg	130	~~135~~	~~135~~	163	~~168~~	~~168~~	293	6th
Francis Sidó	Men's 77 kg	~~131~~	131	~~135~~	160	~~165~~	~~165~~	291	7th
Evaristo González	Men's 85 kg	140	145	~~148~~	170	175	~~178~~	320	6th
José Familia	Men's 105 kg	DNS							
Carolanni Reyes	Women's 48 kg	~~70~~	~~70~~	70	~~87~~	87	~~91~~	157	4th
Georgina Silvestre	Women's 48 kg	70	~~72~~	~~72~~	82	~~85~~	~~85~~	152	6th
Yuderqui Contreras	Women's 53 kg	91	~~96~~	96 PR	~~110~~	110	~~115~~	206	1st place, gold medalist(s)
Yineisy Reyes	Women's 53 kg	83	86	88	95	~~99~~	~~99~~	183	4th
Rosa Matos	Women's +75 kg	90	95	98	118	125	~~128~~	223	5th
Verónica Saladín	Women's +75 kg	~~102~~	102	107	125	~~127~~	~~127~~	232	4th

== Wrestling ==
The Dominican Republic has qualified three athletes in the 55 kg, 60 kg, and 120 kg men's freestyle categories, six athletes in the 55 kg, 60 kg, 66 kg, 74 kg, 84 kg, and 120 kg men's Greco-Roman categories, and two athletes in the 63 kg and 72 kg women's freestyle athletes.

Men

Freestyle

Athlete	Event	Round of 16	Quarterfinals	Semifinals	Final
Athlete	Event	Opposition Result	Opposition Result	Opposition Result	Opposition Result
Juan Ramírez Beltré	55 kg		Luis Orantes (GUA); W VT 5 – 0	Juan Carlos Valverde (ECU); W VT 5 – 0	Obenson Blanc (USA); W PP 3 – 1 (gold)
Gabriel García	60 kg		Franklin Gómez (PUR); L PO 0 – 3		Bronze medal match: Yowlys Bonne (CUB); L PP 1 – 3
Carlos Félix	120 kg		Antoine Jaoude (BRA); W PO 3 – 0	Sunny Dhinsa (USA); L VT 0 – 5	Bronze medal match: Edgardo Lopez (PUR); W PP 3 – 1 (bronze)

Greco-Roman

Athlete	Event	Round of 16	Quarterfinals	Semifinals	Final
Athlete	Event	Opposition Result	Opposition Result	Opposition Result	Opposition Result
Francisco Encarnacion	55 kg		Ildefonso Arangure (MEX); W PO 3 – 0	Jorge Cardozo (VEN); L PO 0 – 3	Bronze medal match: Cristhian Paravecino (PER); W PO 0 – 3 (bronze)
Jansel Ramírez	60 kg		German Diaz (PUR); W VT 5 – 0	Joseph Betterman (USA); L PO 0 – 3	Bronze medal match: Manuel Alejandro Lopez (MEX); W PP 3 – 1 (bronze)
Anyelo Mota	66 kg		Jefrin Mejia (HON); W PO 3 – 0	Ulises Barragan (MEX); W PP 3 – 1	Pedro Isaac Mulens (CUB); L PO 0 – 3 (silver)
Hansel Mercedes	74 kg		Sixto Barrera (PER); W PO 3 – 0	Benjamin Errol Provisor (USA); L PO 0 – 3	Bronze medal match: Elton Brown (PAN); W PO 3 – 0 (bronze)
José Arias	84 kg		Chaight Haight (USA); W PP 3 – 1	Pablo Enrique Shorey (CUB); L PP 1 – 3	Bronze medal match: Jose Antonio Mendoza (MEX); W PO 3 – 0 (bronze)
Ramón García	120 kg		Timothy Taylor (USA); W VB 5 – 0	Mijaín López (CUB); L PO 0 – 3	Bronze medal match: Orlando Ramirez (MEX); W ST 4 – 0 (bronze)

Women

Freestyle

Athlete	Event	Quarterfinals	Semifinals	Final
Athlete	Event	Opposition Result	Opposition Result	Opposition Result
Vanessa Torres	63 kg	Katerina Vidiaux (CUB); L PO 0 – 3		Bronze medal match: Luz Clara Vazquez (ARG); L PO 0 – 3
Elsa Sánchez	72 kg	Natalia Rodriguez (PUR); W PP 3 – 1	Aline Ferreira (BRA); L VT 0 – 5	Bronze medal match: Ashley Zarate (PAN); W PP 3 – 1 (bronze)
