= Wrestling at the 2011 Pan American Games =

- Venue: CODE II Gymnasium
- Dates: October 20–24
- Competitors: 144 from 18 nations

Wrestling competitions at the 2011 Pan American Games in Guadalajara were held from October 20 to October 24 at the CODE II Gymnasium.

== Medal summary ==
* Host nation (Mexico)

Rank	Nation	Gold	Silver	Bronze	Total
1	Cuba	9	2	3	14
2	United States	5	5	2	12
3	Venezuela	1	3	5	9
4	Canada	1	2	4	7
5	Dominican Republic	1	1	7	9
6	Puerto Rico	1	1	0	2
7	Colombia	0	2	5	7
8	Mexico*	0	1	2	3
9	Brazil	0	1	1	2
10	Argentina	0	0	3	3
10	Ecuador	0	0	3	3
12	El Salvador	0	0	1	1
Totals (12 entries)		18	18	36	72

== Men's events ==
=== Men's freestyle ===
Event	Gold	Silver	Bronze
55 kg	Juan Ramírez Beltré; Dominican Republic	Obe Blanc; United States	Steven Takahashi; Canada
55 kg	Juan Ramírez Beltré; Dominican Republic	Obe Blanc; United States	Juan Valverde; Ecuador
60 kg	Franklin Gómez; Puerto Rico	Guillermo Torres; Mexico	Yowlys Bonne; Cuba
60 kg	Franklin Gómez; Puerto Rico	Guillermo Torres; Mexico	Luis Isaias Portillo; El Salvador (Note: The Argentinian Fernando Iglesias lost the bronze medal in wrestling category of 60 kg for giving positive in cases of doping, the medal was assigned to the Salvadoran Luis Portillo (Source).)
66 kg	Liván López; Cuba	Pedro Soto; Puerto Rico	Teyon Ware; United States
66 kg	Liván López; Cuba	Pedro Soto; Puerto Rico	Yoan Blanco; Ecuador
74 kg	Jordan Burroughs; United States	Yunierki Blanco; Cuba	Matt Gentry; Canada
74 kg	Jordan Burroughs; United States	Yunierki Blanco; Cuba	Ricardo Roberty; Venezuela
84 kg	Jake Herbert; United States	Humberto Arencibia; Cuba	Jeffrey Adamson; Canada
84 kg	Jake Herbert; United States	Humberto Arencibia; Cuba	Jose Diaz; Venezuela
96 kg	Jacob Varner; United States	Luis Vivenes; Venezuela	Khetag Pliev; Canada
96 kg	Jacob Varner; United States	Luis Vivenes; Venezuela	Juan Martínez; Colombia
120 kg	Tervel Dlagnev; United States	Sunny Dhinsa; Canada	Disney Rodríguez; Cuba
120 kg	Tervel Dlagnev; United States	Sunny Dhinsa; Canada	Carlos Félix; Dominican Republic

=== Men's Greco-Roman ===
Event	Gold	Silver	Bronze
55 kg	Gustavo Balart; Cuba	Jorge Cardozo; Venezuela	Juan Carlos Lopez; Colombia
55 kg	Gustavo Balart; Cuba	Jorge Cardozo; Venezuela	Francisco Encarnacion; Dominican Republic
60 kg	Luis Liendo; Venezuela	Joseph Betterman; United States	Hanser Meoque; Cuba
60 kg	Luis Liendo; Venezuela	Joseph Betterman; United States	Jansel Ramírez; Dominican Republic
66 kg	Pedro Mulens; Cuba	Anyelo Mota; Dominican Republic	Ulises Barragan; Mexico
66 kg	Pedro Mulens; Cuba	Anyelo Mota; Dominican Republic	Glenn Garrison; United States
74 kg	Jorgisbell Alvarez; Cuba	Ben Provisor; United States	Juan Escobar; Mexico
74 kg	Jorgisbell Alvarez; Cuba	Ben Provisor; United States	Hansel Mercedes; Dominican Republic
84 kg	Pablo Shorey; Cuba	Cristhian Mosquera; Colombia	José Arias; Dominican Republic
84 kg	Pablo Shorey; Cuba	Cristhian Mosquera; Colombia	Yorgen Cova; Venezuela
96 kg	Yunior Estrada; Cuba	Raul Anguilo; Colombia	Yuri Maier; Argentina
96 kg	Yunior Estrada; Cuba	Raul Anguilo; Colombia	Erwin Caraballo; Venezuela
120 kg	Mijaín López; Cuba	Rafael Barreno; Venezuela	Ramón García; Dominican Republic
120 kg	Mijaín López; Cuba	Rafael Barreno; Venezuela	Victor Asprilla; Colombia

== Women's events ==
=== Women's freestyle ===
Event	Gold	Silver	Bronze
48 kg	Carol Huynh; Canada	Clarissa Chun; United States	Patricia Bermúdez; Argentina
48 kg	Carol Huynh; Canada	Clarissa Chun; United States	Carolina Castillo; Colombia
55 kg	Helen Maroulis; United States	Tonya Verbeek; Canada	Joice Silva; Brazil
55 kg	Helen Maroulis; United States	Tonya Verbeek; Canada	Lissette Antes; Ecuador
63 kg	Katerina Vidiaux; Cuba	Elena Pirozhkova; United States	Luz Vázquez; Argentina
63 kg	Katerina Vidiaux; Cuba	Elena Pirozhkova; United States	Sandra Roa; Colombia
72 kg	Lisset Hechevarría; Cuba	Aline Ferreira; Brazil	Jaramit Weffer; Venezuela
72 kg	Lisset Hechevarría; Cuba	Aline Ferreira; Brazil	Elsa Sánchez; Dominican Republic

== Schedule ==
All times are Central Daylight Time (UTC−5).

Day	Date	Start	Finish	Event	Phase
Day 7	Thursday, October 20	10:00	19:10	Men's 55, 66, 84 and 120 kg Greco-Roman	Preliminaries/Semifinals/Repechages/Finals
Day 8	Friday, October 21	10:00	19:10	Men's 60, 74, and 96 kg Greco-Roman	Preliminaries/Semifinals/Repechages/Finals
Day 9	Saturday, October 22	10:00	19:10	Women's 48, 55, 63 and 72 kg freestyle	Preliminaries/Semifinals/Repechages/Finals
Day 10	Sunday, October 23	10:00	19:10	Men's 55, 66, 84 and 120 kg freestyle	Preliminaries/Semifinals/Repechages/Finals
Day 11	Monday, October 24	10:00	19:10	Men's 60, 74, and 96 kg freestyle	Preliminaries/Semifinals/Repechages/Finals

== Qualification ==
Qualification was done at the 2011 Pan American Championship in Rionegro, Colombia between May 6 and 8, 2011. The top eight athletes will qualify in each weight category. Mexico is guaranteed a full team, but if it does not manage to be in the top eight, the athlete from Mexico will take the slot allotted to the eight place athlete. There are also six wild cards to be distributed. Therefore, there is a total quota of 150 athletes.

Nation	Men's Freestyle							Men's Greco-Roman							Women's Freestyle				Total
Nation	55kg	60kg	66kg	74kg	84kg	96kg	120kg	55kg	60kg	66kg	74kg	84kg	96kg	120kg	48kg	55kg	63kg	72kg	Total
Argentina		X	X							X			X		X		X		6
Brazil					X		X	X	X			X				X		X	7
Canada	X	X	X	X	X	X	X			X		X	X		X	X	X	X	14
Chile	X																		1
Colombia		X	X	X	X	X		X	X	X	X	X	X	X	X		X		14
Cuba	X	X	X	X		X	X	X	X	X	X	X	X	X			X	X	15
Dominican Republic	X	X					X	X	X	X	X	X		X			X	X	11
Ecuador	X		X	X			X			X				X	X	X			8
El Salvador		X													X				2
Guatemala	X														X				2
Honduras						X				X			X						3
Mexico	X	X	X	X	X	X	X	X	X	X	X	X	X	X	X	X		X	17
Nicaragua								X											1
Panama					X						X							X	3
Peru				X				X			X					X	X		5
Puerto Rico		X	X		X	X	X		X		X			X	X	X		X	11
United States	X		X	X	X	X	X		X	X	X	X	X	X	X	X	X		15
Venezuela	X	X	X	X	X	X		X	X	X		X	X	X		X	X	X	15
Total: 18 NOCs	9	9	9	8	8	8	8	8	8	10	8	8	8	8	9	8	8	8	150
