= El Salvador at the 2011 Pan American Games =

- IOC code: ESA
- NOC: El Salvador Olympic Committee

in Guadalajara 14–30 October 2011
- Competitors: 79 in 22 sports
- Flag bearer: Pamela Benítez
- Medals Ranked 23rd: Gold 0 Silver 1 Bronze 1 Total 2

Pan American Games appearances (overview)
- 1951; 1955; 1959; 1963; 1967; 1971; 1975; 1979; 1983; 1987; 1991; 1995; 1999; 2003; 2007; 2011; 2015; 2019; 2023

El Salvador competed at the 2011 Pan American Games in Guadalajara, Mexico from October 14 to 30, 2011. El Salvador's team consisted of 79 athletes in 22 sports.

== Medalists ==
Medal	Name	Sport	Event	Date
Silver	Evelyn García	Cycling	Women's Individual Time Trial	October 16
Bronze	Luis Isaias Portillo	Wrestling	Men's Freestyle 60 kg	October 24

== Archery ==
El Salvador qualified three male athletes in the archery competition.

Men

Athlete	Event	Ranking Round		Round of 32	Round of 16	Quarterfinals	Semifinals	Final	Rank
Athlete	Event	Score	Seed	Opposition Score	Opposition Score	Opposition Score	Opposition Score	Opposition Score	Rank
Miguel Veliz	Men's individual	1271	15	J Quintana (CUB); L 1–7	Did not advance				17
Oscar Ticas	Men's individual	1267	16	D Torres (COL); W 6–2	B Ellison (USA); L 0–6	Did not advance			9
Cristobal Merlos	Men's individual	1158	31	C Duenas (CAN); L 0–6	Did not advance				17
Oscar Ticas; Miguel Veliz; Cristobal Merlos	Men's team	3696	8		Ecuador; W 218–196	United States; L 220–224	Did not advance		5

== Athletics ==
El Salvador qualified two male athletes.

=== Men ===
Track and road events

Event	Athletes	Heats		Semifinal		Final	
Event	Athletes	Time	Rank	Time	Rank	Time	Rank
110m hurdles	Renan Palma	14.18	14th	Did not advance			
400 m	Takeshi Fujiwara	46.92	14th	Did not advance			
50 km walk	Emerson Hernández					4:12:53	6th
Marathon	Dimas Castro					3:07:25	17th

Field events

Event	Athletes	Semifinal		Final	
Event	Athletes	Result	Rank	Result	Rank
High jump	Marlon Colorado			2.10	14th

=== Women ===
Track and road events

Event	Athletes	Heats		Semifinal		Final	
Event	Athletes	Time	Rank	Time	Rank	Time	Rank
1.500 m	Gladys Landaverde					4:31.43	8th
3.000 m steeplechase	Zuna Portillo					11:18.40	8th

== Beach volleyball ==
El Salvador qualified a men's team in the beach volleyball competition.

Athlete	Event	Preliminary Round			Quarterfinals	Semifinals	Finals
Athlete	Event	Opposition Score	Opposition Score	Opposition Score	Opposition Score	Opposition Score	Opposition Score
Jeovanny Medrano; David Vargas	Men	Aldo Miramontes (MEX); Juan Virgen (MEX); L 12-21, 15-21	Christian Redmann (CAN); Bejamin Saxton (CAN); L 22-24, 16-21	Guillermo Williman (URU); Nícolas Zanotta (URU); L 11-21, 13-21	Did not advance		
Marcela Avalos; Diana Romero	Women	Bibiana Candelas (MEX); Mayra García (MEX); L 5-21, 12-21	Fabiana Gómez (URU); Lucia Guigou (URU); L 12-21, 15-21	Nathalia Alfaro (CRC); Ingrid Morales (CRC); L 14-21, 15-21	Did not advance		

== Bowling ==
El Salvador qualified two male and two female athletes in the bowling competition.

=== Men ===
Individual

Athlete	Event	Qualification															Eighth Finals	Quarterfinals	Semifinals	Finals	
Athlete	Event	Block 1 (Games 1–6)						Block 2 (Games 7–12)						Total	Average	Rank	Eighth Finals	Quarterfinals	Semifinals	Finals	
Athlete	Event	1	2	3	4	5	6	7	8	9	10	11	12	Total	Average	Rank	Opposition Scores	Opposition Scores	Opposition Scores	Opposition Scores	Rank
Francisco Sanchez	Men's individual	213	198	170	158	160	156	187	175	191	179	216	164	2167	180.6	29th	Did not advance				
Angel Ortiz	Men's individual	183	176	206	189	162	150	171	145	198	174	152	180	2086	173.8	32nd	Did not advance				

Pairs

Athlete	Event	Block 1 (Games 1–6)								Block 2 (Games 7–12)								Grand total	Final Rank
Athlete	Event	1	2	3	4	5	6	Total	Average	7	8	9	10	11	12	Total	Average	Grand total	Final Rank
Angel Ortiz; Francisco Sanchez	Men's pairs	160	174	167	164	187	180	1032	172.0	168	240	184	198	147	190	2159	179.9	4279	16th
Angel Ortiz; Francisco Sanchez	Men's pairs	189	192	172	148	144	179	1024	170.7	137	191	193	197	170	208	2120	176.7	4279	16th

=== Women ===
Individual

Athlete	Event	Qualification															Eighth Finals	Quarterfinals	Semifinals	Finals	
Athlete	Event	Block 1 (Games 1–6)						Block 2 (Games 7–12)						Total	Average	Rank	Eighth Finals	Quarterfinals	Semifinals	Finals	
Athlete	Event	1	2	3	4	5	6	7	8	9	10	11	12	Total	Average	Rank	Opposition Scores	Opposition Scores	Opposition Scores	Opposition Scores	Rank
Eugenia Quintanilla	Women's individual	216	200	133	216	216	142	142	213	171	181	195	169	2194	182.8	18th	Did not advance				
Carmen Granillo	Women's individual	134	192	212	155	206	166	143	171	183	192	197	173	2124	177.0	24th	Did not advance				

Pairs

Athlete	Event	Block 1 (Games 1–6)								Block 2 (Games 7–12)								Grand total	Final Rank
Athlete	Event	1	2	3	4	5	6	Total	Average	7	8	9	10	11	12	Total	Average	Grand total	Final Rank
Carmen Granillo; Eugenia Quintanilla	Women's pairs	166	135	162	199	175	171	1008	168.0	191	134	170	159	197	191	2050	170.8	4116	14th
Carmen Granillo; Eugenia Quintanilla	Women's pairs	180	175	173	167	169	191	1055	175.8	194	150	149	156	171	191	2066	172.2	4116	14th

== Boxing ==
El Salvador qualified two athlete in the 52 kg and 75 kg men's category.

=== Men ===
Athlete	Event	Preliminaries	Quarterfinals	Semifinals	Final
Athlete	Event	Opposition Result	Opposition Result	Opposition Result	Opposition Result
Jhon Nelson Corona	Flyweight		Juliao Henriques Nieto (BRA); L 5-25	Did not advance	
Mario Bernal	Middleweight	Juan Mercado (MEX); W DSQ	Brody Blair (CAN); L 12-24	Did not advance	

== Cycling ==
=== Road ===
==== Men ====
Athlete	Event	Time	Rank
Charli Quiñonez	Road race	DNF	

==== Women ====
Athlete	Event	Time	Rank
Evelyn García	Road race	2:18:23	12th
Evelyn García	Road time trial	28:13.76	2nd place, silver medalist(s)

=== Mountain biking ===
==== Men ====
Athlete	Event	Time	Rank
Charli Quiñonez	Cross-country	DNF	

==== Women ====
Athlete	Event	Time	Rank
Jennifer Portillo	Cross-country	DNF	

== Equestrian ==
=== Eventing ===
Athlete	Horse	Event	Dressage		Cross-country		Jumping				Total	
Athlete	Horse	Event	Dressage		Cross-country		Qualifier		Final		Total	
Athlete	Horse	Event	Penalties	Rank	Penalties	Rank	Penalties	Rank	Penalties	Rank	Penalties	Rank
Luis Gonzalo Gamboa	Henry	Individual	76.50	48th	RT		Did not advance					

=== Individual jumping ===
Athlete	Horse	Event	Ind. 1st Qualifier		Ind. 2nd Qualifier			Ind. 3rd Qualifier			Ind. Final					
Athlete	Horse	Event	Ind. 1st Qualifier		Ind. 2nd Qualifier			Ind. 3rd Qualifier			Round A		Round B		Total	
Athlete	Horse	Event	Penalties	Rank	Penalties	Total	Rank	Penalties	Total	Rank	Penalties	Rank	Penalties	Rank	Penalties	Rank
Jose Alfredo Hernandez	Silverado	Individual	13.12	47th	9.00	22.12	34th	13.00	35.12	44th	Did not advance					

== Fencing ==
El Salvador qualified two athletes in the men's épée competition, one athlete in the men's sabre competition, and one athlete in the women's foil competition.

=== Men ===
Event	Athlete	Round of Poules		Round of 16	Quarterfinals	Semifinals	Final
Event	Athlete	Result	Seed	Opposition Score	Opposition Score	Opposition Score	Opposition Score
Individual épée	Gerson Ramirez	1 V – 4 D	14th Q	Silvio Fernández (ESA); L 11 – 15	Did not advance		
Individual épée	David Ramirez	1 V – 4 D	16th Q	Paris Inostroza (CHI); L 3 – 15	Did not advance		
Individual foil	Rodrigo Casamalhuapa	0 V – 5 D	18th	Did not advance			
Individual sabre	John Lopez	1 V – 4 D	15th Q	Renza Agresta (BRA); L 3 – 15	Did not advance		
Team épée	Lucas Hernandez; David Ramirez; Gerson Ramirez; Rodrigo Casamalhuapa			United States; L 27 – 45	Did not advance		

=== Women ===
Event	Athlete	Round of Poules		Round of 16	Quarterfinals	Semifinals	Final
Event	Athlete	Result	Seed	Opposition Score	Opposition Score	Opposition Score	Opposition Score
Individual foil	Ivania Carballo	0 V – 5 D	18th	Did not advance			

== Gymnastics ==
=== Artistic ===
El Salvador qualified one male athlete in the artistic gymnastics competition.

==== Men ====
Individual qualification & Team Finals

Athlete	Event	Apparatus						Qualification		Final	
Athlete	Event	Vault	Floor	Pommel horse	Rings	Parallel bars	Horizontal bar	Total	Rank	Total	Rank
Oscar Cañas Figeroa	Ind Qualification	12.750	12.200	13.400	11.700	12.800	12.800	75.550	26th		
Oscar Cañas Figeroa	Ind all round	12.300	12.650	12.500	10.800	11.850	12.650	72.750	19th		

== Judo ==
El Salvador qualified two athletes in the 66 kg and 100 kg men's categories and one athlete in the 70 kg women's category.

=== Men ===
Athlete	Event	Round of 16	Quarterfinals	Semifinals	Final
Athlete	Event	Opposition Result	Opposition Result	Opposition Result	Opposition Result
Carlos A. Figueroa	-66 kg		Francisco Carreón (MEX); L 000 S2 – 001 S1	Did not advance (to repechage round)	
Diego Armando Ochoa	-100 kg		Cristian Schmidt (ARG); L 001 S1 – 110 S2	Did not advance (to repechage round)	

Repechage Rounds

Athlete	Event	Repechage 8	Finel of Repechage	Bronze Final
Athlete	Event	Opposition Result	Opposition Result	Opposition Result
Carlos A. Figueroa	-66 kg		Sasha Mehmedovic (CAN); L 001 – 101	Did not advance
Diego Armando Ochoa	-100 kg		Camilo Castaño (COL); W 100 S1 – 000	Sergio García (MEX); L 000 SH – 100

== Karate ==
El Salvador qualified four male athletes.

Athlete	Event	Round Robin (Pool A/B)			Semifinals	Final
Athlete	Event	Match 1	Match 2	Match 3	Semifinals	Final
Athlete	Event	Opposition Result	Opposition Result	Opposition Result	Opposition Result	Opposition Result
David G. Perez	Men's -60 kg	Miguel Soffia (CHI); L KIK 0:0	Andrés Rendón (COL); L KIK 0:0	Adam Brozer (USA); L KIK 0:0	Did not advance	
Carlos Galan	Men's -67 kg	Jesus Paucarcaja (PER); HKW 0:0	Daniel Carrillo (MEX); L PTS 0:7	Jean Carlos Peña (VEN); HKW 0:0	Did not advance	
Aaron N. Perez	Men's -75 kg	Thomas A. Scott (USA); L PTS 0:1	Gustavo Dionisio (DOM); HKW 0:0	Esteban Espinoza (ECU); HKW 0:0	Did not advance	
Jose Hector Paz	Men's -84 kg	Cesar Herrera (VEN); L PTS 1:7	Jorge Junior Perez (DOM); L PTS 2:7	Edwin Assereto (PER); L PTS 0:1	Did not advance	
Jorge A. Merino	Men's +84 kg	Angel Aponte (VEN); L PTS 0:2	Franco Recouso (ARG); W PTS 1:0	Wellington Barbosa (BRA); HKW 1:1	Did not advance	

== Roller skating ==
El Salvador qualified a men's and women's team in the roller skating competition.

Men

Athlete	Event	Qualification		Final	
Athlete	Event	Result	Rank	Result	Rank
David Ramos	300 m time trial			26.309	6th
Odir Miranda	1,000 m	DNF		Did not advance	
Odir Miranda	10,000 m			DNF	

Women

Athlete	Event	Qualification		Final	
Athlete	Event	Result	Rank	Result	Rank
Evelyn Ramos	300 m time trial			29.464	8th
Evelyn Ramos	1,000 m			1:42.263	5th
Judith Lopez	10,000 m			DNF	

== Rowing ==
=== Men ===
Athlete(s)	Event	Heats		Repechage		Final	
Athlete(s)	Event	Time	Rank	Time	Rank	Time	Rank
Roberto Carlos Lopez	Single sculls (M1×)	7:40.09	5th R	7:36.57	4th QB	7:21.01	3rd
Juan Alvarez; Francisco Chacon	Lightweight double sculls (LM2×)	7:08.12	5th R	6:53.80	4th QB	6:49.47	3rd

=== Women ===
Athlete(s)	Event	Heats		Repechage		Final	
Athlete(s)	Event	Time	Rank	Time	Rank	Time	Rank
Ana Vargas	Single sculls (W1×)	8:04.49	1st QF			8:16.85	5th
Marta Figueroa	Lightweight single sculls (LW1×)	8:45.22	3rd R	8:12.62	4th QF	8:15.91	6th

== Shooting ==
El Salvador qualified six athletes in shooting.

Men

Event	Athlete	Qualification		Final	
Event	Athlete	Score	Rank	Score	Rank
10 m air pistol	Julio Molina	565-12x	14th	Did not advance	
10 m air rifle	Rene Mira	579-32x	17th	Did not advance	
25 m rapid fire pistol	Julio Molina	563- 8x	5th Q	571.0	5th
50 m pistol	Julio Molina	523- 4x	22nd	Did not advance	
50 m rifle prone	Rafael Espinoza	576-21x	23rd	Did not advance	
50 m rifle three positions	Rafael Espinoza	1132- 43x	12th	Did not advance	

Women

Event	Athlete	Qualification		Final	
Event	Athlete	Score	Rank	Score	Rank
10 m air pistol	Lilian Castro	359- 4x	21st	Did not advance	
10 m air rifle	Melissa Mikec	388-24x	8th Q	489.0	7th
10 m air rifle	Johana Pineda	383-24x	19th	Did not advance	
25 m pistol	Lilian Castro	538- 8x	21st	Did not advance	
50 m rifle three positions	Veronica Rivas	565-15x	9th	Did not advance	
50 m rifle three positions	Johana Pineda	567-19x	6th Q	662.6	5th

== Swimming ==
El Salvador qualified four swimmers.

Men

Event	Athletes	Heats		Final	
Event	Athletes	Time	Position	Time	Position
100 m Breaststroke	Juan Alberto Guerra	1:06.40	20th	Did not advance	
200 m Breaststroke	Juan Alberto Guerra	2:26.95	14th QB	2:29.15	8th B

Women

Event	Athletes	Heats		Final	
Event	Athletes	Time	Position	Time	Position
200 m Freestyle	Alexia Benitez	2:07.30	10th QB	2:06.15	3rd B
400 m Freestyle	Alexia Benitez	4:26.05	13th QB	4:23.53	3rd B
800 m Freestyle	Alexia Benitez	9:05.16	8th Q	9:03.53	7th
10 km marathon	Yadira Guerra			DNF	

== Squash ==
El Salvador qualified three male athletes in the squash competition.

Men

Event	Athlete(s)	First round	Round of 16	Quarterfinal	Semifinal	Final
Event	Athlete(s)	Opposition Result	Opposition Result	Opposition Result	Opposition Result	Opposition Result
Walter Weisskopf	Singles	Graham Bassett (USA); L 11-7, 7-11, 2-11, 11-5, 3-11	Did not advance			
Byron Garcia	Singles	Andrés Duany (CAN); L 3-11, 2-11, 10-12	Did not advance			
Byron Garcia; Walter Weisskopf	Doubles			Christopher Gordon (USA); Julian Illingworth (USA); L 8 – 11, 9 – 11	Did not advance	

Team

Athletes	Event	Preliminaries Group stage			Quarterfinal	Semifinal	Final
Athletes	Event	Opposition Result	Opposition Result	Opposition Result	Opposition Result	Opposition Result	Opposition Result
Walter Weisskopf; Jose Molina; Byron Garcia	Team	United States; L 1-3, 1-3, 0-3	Mexico; L 0-3, 0-3, 0-3		Did not advance		

== Table tennis ==
El Salvador qualified three male and three female athletes in the table tennis competition.

Men

Athlete	Event	Round Robin			1st round	Eighthfinals	Quarterfinals	Semifinals	Final
Athlete	Event	Match 1	Match 2	Match 3	1st round	Eighthfinals	Quarterfinals	Semifinals	Final
Athlete	Event	Opposition Result	Opposition Result	Opposition Result	Opposition Result	Opposition Result	Opposition Result	Opposition Result	Opposition Result
Saul Bonilla	Singles	Jonathan Pino (VEN); L 1 – 4	Felipe Olivares (CHI); L 0 – 4	Thiago Monteiro (BRA); L 0 – 4	Did not advance				
Josue Donado	Singles	Hugo Hoyama (BRA); L 0 – 4	Pierre-Luc Hinse (CAN); L 0 – 4	Heber Moscoso (GUA); W 4 – 2	Did not advance				
Luis Mejía	Singles	Pavel Oxamendi (CUB); L 2 – 4	Mark Hazinski (COL); L 0 – 4	Ju Lin (DOM); L 0 – 4	Did not advance				
Geovanny Coello; Alberto Mino; Dino Suarez	Team	Venezuela; L 2 – 3, 1 – 3, 0 – 3	Cuba; L 0 – 3, 0 – 3, 0 – 3				Did not advance		

Women

Athlete	Event	Round Robin			1st round	Eighthfinals	Quarterfinals	Semifinals	Final
Athlete	Event	Match 1	Match 2	Match 3	1st round	Eighthfinals	Quarterfinals	Semifinals	Final
Athlete	Event	Opposition Result	Opposition Result	Opposition Result	Opposition Result	Opposition Result	Opposition Result	Opposition Result	Opposition Result
Sandra Orellana	Singles	Eva Brito (DOM); L 1 – 4	Berta Rodríguez (CHI); L 0 – 4	Paula Medina (COL); L 0 – 4	Did not advance				
Karla Pérez	Singles	Lisi Castillo (CUB); L 0 – 4	Francesa Vargas (PER); L 0 – 4	Lily Zhang (USA); L 0 – 4	Did not advance				
Wang De Ying	Singles	Jessica Yamada (BRA); L 2 – 4	Carelyn Cordero (PUR); W 4 – 1	Johenny Valdez (DOM); L 1 – 4	Did not advance				
Sandra Orellana; Karla Perez; Wang De Ying	Team	Colombia; L 3 – 1, 0 – 3, 1 – 3, 0 – 3	Venezuela; L 1 – 3, 2 – 3, 3 – 2, 1 – 3				Did not advance		

== Tennis ==
Men

Athlete	Event	1st Round	Round of 32	Round of 16	Quarterfinals	Semifinals	Final
Athlete	Event	Opposition Score	Opposition Score	Opposition Score	Opposition Score	Opposition Score	Opposition Score
Rafael Arévalo	Singles	Daniel Garza (MEX); L 2 – 6, 2 – 6	Did not advance				
Marcelo Arévalo	Singles	Haydn Lewis (BAR); W 6 – 4, 6 – 4	Eduardo Schwank (ARG); W 6 – 4, 6 – 1	Alejandro González (COL); L 3 – 5 RET	Did not advance		
Rafael Arévalo; Marcelo Arévalo	Doubles			Víctor Estrella (DOM); Jose Hernandez (DOM); W 6 – 3, 6(2) – 7, [10-6]	Nicholas Monroe (USA); Greg Ouellette (USA); L WO		

== Taekwondo ==
El Salvador qualified one athlete in the 67 kg women's category.

Women

Athlete	Event	Round of 16	Quarterfinals	Semifinals	Final	
Athlete	Event	Opposition Result	Opposition Result	Opposition Result	Opposition Result	Rank
Laura Vazquez	Flyweight (-49kg)		Nicole Palma (USA); L 4 – 9	Did not advance		

== Triathlon ==
=== Men ===
Athlete	Event	Swim (1.5 km)	Trans 1	Bike (40 km)	Trans 2	Run (10 km)	Total	Rank
Carlos Hernández	Individual	DNF						

== Weightlifting ==
Athlete	Event	Snatch			Clean & jerk			Total	Rank
Athlete	Event	Attempt 1	Attempt 2	Attempt 3	Attempt 1	Attempt 2	Attempt 3	Total	Rank
Julio Cesar Salamanca	Men's 69 kg	~~110~~	110	~~113~~	136	140	~~145~~	250	5th
Marvin Lopez Aquino	Men's 69 kg	108	~~111~~	~~111~~	135	~~135~~	~~140~~	243	6th
Génesis Murcia	Women's 48 kg	~~68~~	68	~~71~~	83	~~85~~	85	153	5th

== Wrestling ==
El Salvador qualified one athlete in the 48 kg women's freestyle category.

Men

Freestyle

Athlete	Event	Quarterfinals	Semifinals	Final	Rank
Athlete	Event	Opposition Result	Opposition Result	Opposition Result	Rank
Luis Isaias Portillo	60 kg	Guillermo Torres (MEX); L PP 1 – 3		Bronze medal match: Fernando Iglesias (ARG); L PO 0 – 3	(bronze) (Note: The Argentinian Fernando Iglesias lost the bronze medal in wrestling category of 60 kg for giving positive in cases of doping, the medal was assigned to the salvadoran Luis Portillo (Source).)

Women

Freestyle

Athlete	Event	Quarterfinals	Semifinals	Final
Athlete	Event	Opposition Result	Opposition Result	Opposition Result
Ingrid Medrano	48 kg	Patricia Bermudez (ARG); L PO 0 – 3	Did not advance	
