= Ernesto Franco =

Italian academic and writer (1956–2024)

- Born: 11 August 1956; Genoa, Italy
- Died: 10 September 2024 (aged 68); Genoa, Italy
- Education: University of Genoa
- Occupations: Academic; Writer

Ernesto Franco (11 August 1956 – 10 September 2024) was an Italian academic and writer.

== Biography ==
Born in Genoa on 11 August 1956, Franco earned a degree in literature from the University of Genoa. He then worked in the publishing houses Marietti Editore and Garzanti and subsequently taught at his alma mater. A specialist in Hispano-American culture, he translated works by Jorge Luis Borges, Julio Cortázar, Álvaro Mutis, Octavio Paz, Ernesto Sabato, and Mario Vargas Llosa. He also edited an anthology on fantastic literature with texts by Borges, Silvina Ocampo, and Adolfo Bioy Casares. In 1998, he became editor-in-chief at Giulio Einaudi Editore. In 1999, he received the Viareggio Prize for Vite senza fine.

Franco died on 10 September 2024, at the age of 68.

== Works ==
- Isolario (1994)
- Vite senza fine (1999)
- Nostro mostro Moby Dick (2003)
- Usodimare. Un racconto per voce sola (2007)
- Donna cometa (2020)
- Storie fantastiche di isole vere (2024)
