= Mexico at the 2011 Pan American Games =

- IOC code: MEX
- NOC: Comité Olímpico Mexicano (in Spanish)

in Guadalajara 14–30 October 2011
- Competitors: 646 in 36 sports
- Flag bearer: Juan René Serrano
- Medals Ranked 4th: Gold 42 Silver 41 Bronze 50 Total 133

Pan American Games appearances (overview)
- 1951; 1955; 1959; 1963; 1967; 1971; 1975; 1979; 1983; 1987; 1991; 1995; 1999; 2003; 2007; 2011; 2015; 2019; 2023

Mexico hosted the 2011 Pan American Games in Guadalajara, Mexico from October 14 to 30, 2011. Mexico has competed in every edition of the Pan American Games since the first games held in Buenos Aires, Argentina. Mexico began their participation having achieved 782 medals in total with 155 of them gold. On August 24, 2011, the head of CONADE, Bernardo de la Garza stated that the Mexican athletes would look to break the country's historic record of achieving 23 gold medals in a single Games, which happened at the 1995 Pan American Games in Mar del Plata, Argentina. For that specific objective, the Mexican delegation has landed its hopes on the disciplines of diving, taekwondo, archery, racquetball, basque pelota, and athletics, most specifically in the athletes: Paola Espinosa, Paola Longoria, Alberto Rodríguez, Eder Sánchez, Damián Villa, Yahel Castillo, and Juan René Serrano (flagbearer), who are the strongest possibilities of winning a gold medal in their respective disciplines.

The Mexican Olympic Committee (COM) announced that the Mexican delegation would be made by 646 athletes, 279 of them women and 367 men, who will participate in all 36 sports. On September 20, 2011, the COM announced that the Mexican archer Juan René Serrano would be the flagbearer. On a protocolary ceremony held on September 23, 2011, the Mexican president Felipe Calderón made the official handing of the national flag to the archer, encouraging both pan American and parapan American athletes to give their best effort at the games.

== Medalists ==
Medal	Name	Sport	Event	Date
Gold	Óscar Soto	Modern pentathlon	Men's individual	October 16
Gold	Irma Contreras	Taekwondo	Women's 57 kg	October 16
Gold	Arturo Salazar; Eric Gálvez	Squash	Men's doubles	October 17
Gold	Samantha Terán; Nayelly Hernández	Squash	Women's doubles	October 17
Gold	Cynthia Valdez	Rhythmic gymnastics	Hoop	October 17
Gold	Samantha Terán	Squash	Women's singles	October 17
Gold	Analicia Ramirez; Lila Perez	Rowing	Women's lightweight double sculls	October 18
Gold	Gerardo Sánchez; Alan Armenta	Rowing	Men's lightweight double sculls	October 18
Gold	Cynthia Valdez	Rhythmic gymnastics	Clubs	October 18
Gold	Aída Román; Mariana Avitia; Alejandra Valencia	Archery	Women's team	October 21
Gold	Eric Gálvez; César Salazar; Arturo Salazar	Squash	Men's team	October 21
Gold	Santiago González; Ana Paula de la Peña	Tennis	Mixed doubles	October 21
Gold	Alejandra Valencia	Archery	Women's individual	October 22
Gold	Paola Longoria	Racquetball	Women's singles	October 22
Gold	Paola Longoria; Samantha Salas	Racquetball	Women's doubles	October 22
Gold	Álvaro Beltrán; Javier Moreno	Racquetball	Men's doubles	October 22
Gold	Marisol Romero	Athletics	Women's 10,000 m	October 24
Gold	Juan Luis Barrios	Athletics	Men's 5,000 m	October 24
Gold	Paola Longoria; Samantha Salas	Racquetball	Women's team	October 25
Gold	Álvaro Beltrán; Javier Moreno; Gilberto Mejía	Racquetball	Men's team	October 25
Gold	Paola Espinosa	Diving	Women's 10 m platform	October 26
Gold	Yahel Castillo; Julian Sánchez	Diving	Men's synchronized 3 m springboard	October 26
Gold	Daniel Corral	Gymnastics	Men's pommel horse	October 27
Gold	Marisol Romero	Athletics	Women's 5,000 metres	October 27
Gold	Heriberto López	Basque pelota	Men's mano singles trinkete	October 27
Gold	Jorge Alcántara; Orlando Díaz	Basque pelota	Men's mano doubles 36 m fronton	October 27
Gold	Fernando Medina	Basque pelota	Men's mano singles 36 m fronton	October 27
Gold	Paulina Castillo; Guadalupe Hernández	Basque pelota	Women's frontenis pairs 30 m fronton	October 27
Gold	Alberto Rodríguez; Arturo Rodríguez	Basque pelota	Men's Frontenis Pairs 30m Fronton	October 27
Gold	Paola Espinosa; Tatiana Ortiz	Diving	Women's 10 synchronized m platform	October 27
Gold	Yahel Castillo	Diving	Men's 3 m springboard	October 27
Gold	Joselito Velázquez	Boxing	Light flyweight	October 28
Gold	Everardo Cristóbal	Canoeing	Men's C-1 1000 m	October 28
Gold	Iván García; Germán Sánchez	Diving	Men's synchronized 10 m platform	October 28
Gold	Laura Sánchez	Diving	Women's 3 m springboard	October 28
Gold	Mexico national football team: José de Jesús Corona; Hugo Isaác Rodríguez; Hiram Mier; Néstor Araujo; Dárvin Chávez; Jesús Zavala; Javier Aquino; Carlos Emilio Orrantía; Oribe Peralta; Othoniel Arce; Jerónimo Amione; José Antonio Rodríguez; Ricardo Bocanegra; Jorge Enríquez; César Ibáñez; Miguel Ángel Ponce; Isaác Brizuela; Diego Reyes	Football	Men's tournament	October 28
Gold	Ana Lago	Gymnastics	Women's floor	October 28
Gold	Daniel Corral	Gymnastics	Men's parallel bars	October 28
Gold	Horacio Nava	Athletics	Men's 50 km walk	October 29
Gold	Bertha Gutiérrez	Karate	Women's 61 kg	October 29
Gold	Iván García	Diving	Men's 10 metre platform	October 29
Gold	Paola Espinosa; Laura Sánchez	Diving	Women's synchronized 3 m springboard	October 29
Silver	Laura Morfin	Cycling	Women's cross country	October 15
Silver	Cynthia Valdez	Rhythmic gymnastics	Ind All-around	October 15
Silver	Damián Villa	Taekwondo	Men's 58 kg	October 15
Silver	Cynthia Valdez	Rhythmic gymnastics	Ball	October 17
Silver	César Salazar	Squash	Men's singles	October 17
Silver	Cynthia Valdez	Rhythmic gymnastics	Ribbon	October 18
Silver	Patrick Loliger	Rowing	Men's single sculls	October 19
Silver	Luz Gaxiola	Cycling	Women's Keirin	October 20
Silver	Sofía Arreola	Cycling	Women's Omnium	October 20
Silver	Marcos Madrid	Table tennis	Men's singles	October 20
Silver	Bibiana Candelas; Mayra García	Beach volleyball	Women's tournament	October 21
Silver	Juan René Serrano; Luis Eduardo Vélez; Pedro Vivas	Archery	Men's team	October 21
Silver	Gilberto Mejia	Racquetball	Men's singles	October 22
Silver	Demita Vega	Sailing	Women's sailboard	October 23
Silver	Tania Elías Calles	Sailing	Women's Laser Radial class	October 23
Silver	Madaí Pérez	Athletics	Women's marathon	October 23
Silver	Guillermo Torres	Wrestling	Men's Freestyle 60 kg	October 24
Silver	Sandra Góngora; Miriam Zetter	Bowling	Women's pairs	October 25
Silver	Gabriela Medina	Athletics	Women's 800 m	October 25
Silver	Mexico women's national basketball team: Alexis Castro; Selene Garcia; Margarita Silva; Mónica Garcia; Erika Gomez; Nadia Bibbs; Lourdes de Anda; Sonia Ortega; Maylene Ornelas; Laura Nuñez; Fernanda Gutierrez; Sofia Garcia	Basketball	Women's tournament	October 25
Silver	Rodrigo Ledesma; Francisco Javier Mendiburu	Basque pelota	Men's Paleta Leather Pairs 36m	October 26
Silver	Jesus Homero Hurtado; Daniel Salvador Rodriguez	Basque pelota	Men's Paleta Rubber Pairs 30m	October 26
Silver	Anais Abraham; Karina Alanís; Alicia Guluarte; Maricela Montemayor	Canoeing	Women's K-4 500 metres	October 26
Silver	Tatiana Ortiz	Diving	Women's 10 metre platform	October 26
Silver	Cinthya Domínguez	Weightlifting	Women's 69 kg	October 26
Silver	Elsa García	Gymnastics	Women's vault	October 27
Silver	Juan Romero	Athletics	Men's 10,000 metres	October 27
Silver	Julian Sánchez	Diving	Men's 3 metre springboard	October 27
Silver	Xunashi Cabarello	Karate	Women's +68 kg	October 27
Silver	Alberto Ramírez	Karate	Men's +84 kg	October 27
Silver	Óscar Valdez	Boxing	Bantamweight	October 28
Silver	Úrsula González; Angelica Aguilar; Angélica Larios; Alejandra Terán	Fencing	Women's team sabre	October 28
Silver	Karina Acosta	Judo	Women's 63 kg	October 28
Silver	Yadira Lira	Karate	Women's 68 kg	October 28
Silver	José Leyver	Athletics	Men's 50 km walk	October 29
Silver	Óscar Molina	Boxing	Welterweight	October 29
Silver	Juan Hiracheta	Boxing	Super heavyweight	October 29
Silver	Erika Cruz	Boxing	Women's light welterweight	October 29
Silver	Rommel Pacheco	Diving	Men's 10 m platform	October 29
Silver	Nabor Castillo	Judo	Men's 60 kg	October 29
Silver	Mexico national basketball team: Paul Stoll; Jovan Harris; Pedro Meza; Christopher Hernandez; Adam Parada; Michael Strobbe; Victor Mariscal; Omar Quintero; Héctor Hernández; Orlando Méndez; Lorenzo Real; Jesús López	Basketball	Men's tournament	October 30
Bronze	Tamara Vega	Modern pentathlon	Women's individual	October 15
Bronze	Jannet Alegría	Taekwondo	Women's 49 kg	October 15
Bronze	Fernanda González	Swimming	Women's 100 m backstroke	October 16
Bronze	Marcos Madrid; Guillermo Muñoz; Jude Okoh	Table tennis	Men's team	October 16
Bronze	Arturo Salazar	Squash	Men's singles	October 17
Bronze	Rosa del Carmen Peña	Shooting	Women's 10 m air rifle	October 17
Bronze	Nancy Contreras; Daniela Gaxiola	Cycling	Women's team sprint	October 17
Bronze	Uriel Adriano	Taekwondo	Men's 80 kg	October 17
Bronze	Patrick Loliger; Horacio Rangel; Edgar Valenzuela; Santiago Santaella	Rowing	Men's quadruple sculls	October 18
Bronze	Victoria Montero	Badminton	Women's singles	October 18
Bronze	Lino Muñoz; Andrés López	Badminton	Men's doubles	October 18
Bronze	Guadalupe Ruiz	Taekwondo	Women's +67 kg	October 18
Bronze	José Alberto Vargas	Trampoline gymnastics	Men's trampoline	October 18
Bronze	Fernanda González; Patricia Castañeda; Liliana Ibáñez; Susana Escobar	Swimming	Women's 4 × 200 freestyle medley	October 18
Bronze	Rita Medrano	Swimming	Women's 200 m butterfly	October 19
Bronze	Samantha Terán; Imelda Salazar; Nayelly Hernández	Squash	Women's team	October 20
Bronze	Fernanda González	Swimming	Women's 200 m backstroke	October 20
Bronze	Ulises Barragan	Wrestling	Men's Greco-Roman 66 kg	October 20
Bronze	Álvaro Beltrán	Racquetball	Men's singles	October 21
Bronze	Juan Escobar	Wrestling	Men's Greco-Roman 74 kg	October 21
Bronze	Aída Román	Archery	Women's individual	October 22
Bronze	Jose Lino Montes	Weightlifting	Men's 56 kg	October 23
Bronze	Carlos Lamadrid	Water skiing	Men's slalom	October 23
Bronze	David Mier y Teran	Sailing	Men's sailboard	October 23
Bronze	Francia Peñuñuri	Weightlifting	Women's 53 kg	October 24
Bronze	Elsa García; Marisela Cantú; Ana Lago; Karla Salazar; Yessenia Estrada; Alexa Moreno	Gymnastics	Women's artistic team all-around	October 24
Bronze	Nataly Michel	Fencing	Women's foil	October 24
Bronze	Luz Acosta	Weightlifting	Women's 63 kg	October 25
Bronze	Romary Rifka	Athletics	Women's high jump	October 26
Bronze	Adrian Raya; Guillermo Jorge Verdeja	Basque pelota	Men's Paleta Rubber Pairs Trinkete	October 26
Bronze	Ariana Yolanda Cepeda; Rocio Guillen	Basque pelota	Women's Paleta Rubber Pairs Trinkete	October 26
Bronze	Sergio García	Judo	Men's 100 kg	October 26
Bronze	Vanessa Zambotti	Judo	Women's +78 kg	October 26
Bronze	Veronica Elias	Roller skating	Women's 300 metre time trial	October 26
Bronze	Aremi Fuentes	Weightlifting	Women's 69 kg	October 26
Bronze	Marisela Cantú	Gymnastics	Women's uneven bars	October 27
Bronze	Elsa García	Gymnastics	Women's uneven bars	October 27
Bronze	Team Mexico	Equestrian	Team jumping	October 27
Bronze	Mexico women's national football team: Aurora Santiago; Erika Venegas; Kenti Robles; Rubí Sandoval; Jennifer Ruiz; Valeria Miranda; Mónica Vergara; Marylin Díaz; Luz del Rosario Saucedo; Stephany Mayor; Guadalupe Worbis; Dinora Garza; Liliana Mercado; Liliana Godoy; Verónica Pérez; Maribel Domínguez; Mónica Ocampo; Tanya Samarzich	Football	Women's tournament	October 27
Bronze	Isao Cardenas	Judo	Men's 90 kg	October 27
Bronze	Tania Mascorro	Weightlifting	Women's +75 kg	October 27
Bronze	Homero Morales	Karate	Men's 84 kg	October 28
Bronze	Alma Ibarra	Boxing	Women's Light heavyweight 81 kg	October 28
Bronze	Giovanni Lanaro	Athletics	Men's high jump	October 28
Bronze	Paola Espinosa	Diving	Women's 3 metre springboard	October 28
Bronze	Braulio Ávila	Boxing	Men's Flyweight 52 kg	October 29
Bronze	Angel Gutierrez	Boxing	Men's Lightweight 60 kg	October 29
Bronze	Armando Pina	Boxing	Men's Light heavyweight 81 kg	October 29
Bronze	Alexandra Avena; Andrea Millán; Alejandra Terán; Alely Hernández	Fencing	Women's team épée	October 29
Bronze	Daniel Carrillo	Karate	Men's 67 kg	October 29

Medals by sport
Sport	1st place, gold medalist(s)	2nd place, silver medalist(s)	3rd place, bronze medalist(s)	Total
Diving	8	3	1	12
Basque pelota	5	2	2	9
Racquetball	5	1	1	7
Athletics	4	4	2	10
Squash	4	1	2	7
Artistic Gymnastics	3	1	3	7
Rhythmic Gymnastics	2	3	0	5
Rowing	2	1	1	4
Archery	2	1	1	4
Boxing	1	4	4	9
Karate	1	3	2	6
Taekwondo	1	1	3	5
Canoeing	1	1	0	2
Modern pentathlon	1	0	1	2
Football	1	0	1	2
Tennis	1	0	0	1
Cycling	0	3	1	4
Sailing	0	2	1	3
Weightlifting	0	1	5	6
Judo	0	2	3	5
Basketball	0	2	0	2
Wrestling	0	1	2	3
Fencing	0	1	2	3
Table tennis	0	1	1	2
Beach volleyball	0	1	0	1
Bowling	0	1	0	1
Swimming	0	0	4	4
Badminton	0	0	2	2
Shooting	0	0	1	1
Trampoline Gymnastics	0	0	1	1
Water skiing	0	0	1	1
Roller skating	0	0	1	1
Equestrian	0	0	1	1
Total	42	41	50	133
