= Chile at the 2011 Pan American Games =

- IOC code: CHI
- NOC: Comité Olímpico de Chile

in Guadalajara 14–30 October 2011
- Competitors: 308 in 32 sports
- Flag bearer: David Dubó
- Medals Ranked 13th: Gold 3 Silver 16 Bronze 24 Total 43

Pan American Games appearances (overview)
- 1951; 1955; 1959; 1963; 1967; 1971; 1975; 1979; 1983; 1987; 1991; 1995; 1999; 2003; 2007; 2011; 2015; 2019; 2023; 2027

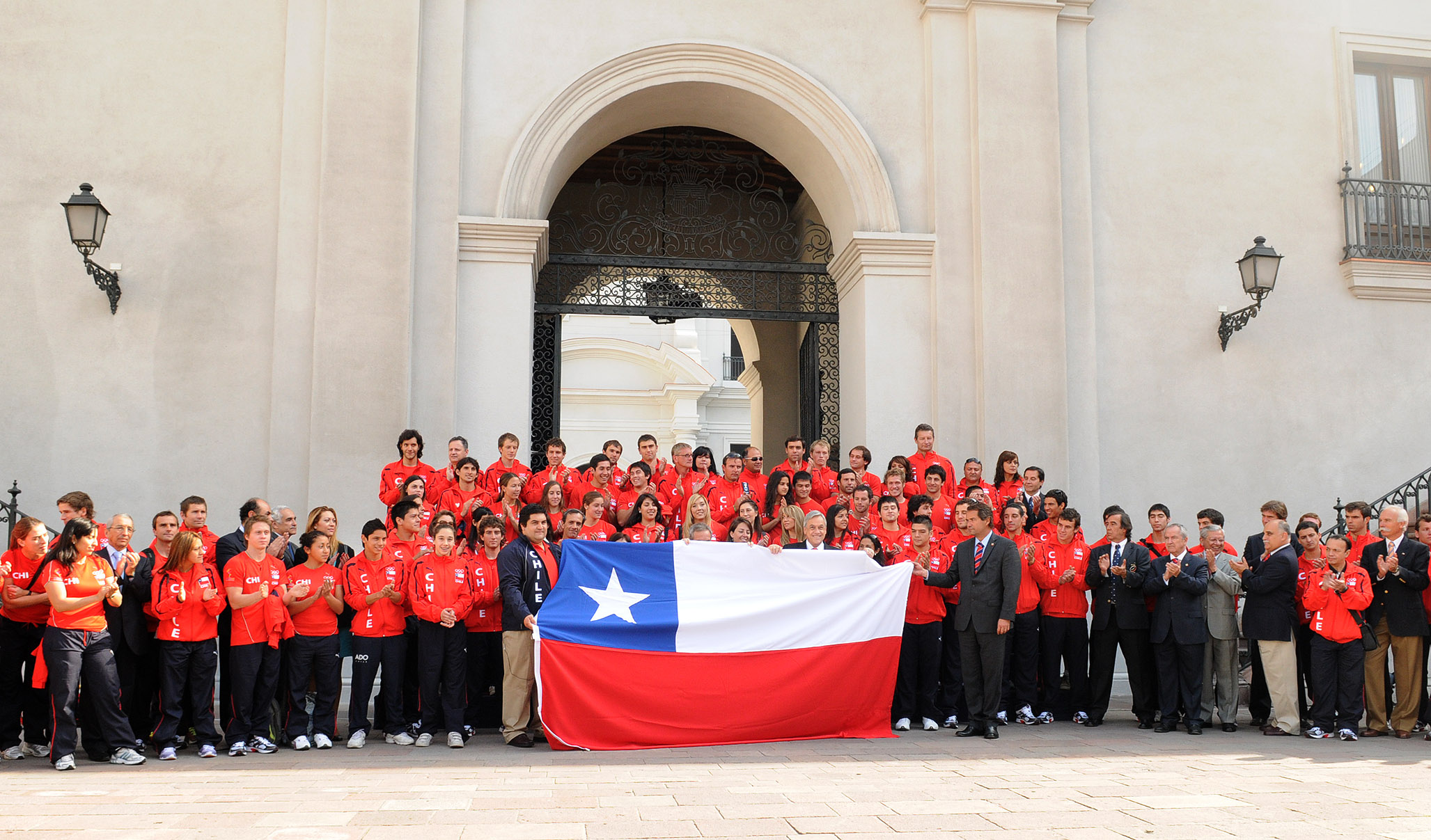
Chilean delegation to the 2011 Pan American Games with President Sebastián Piñera at La Moneda Palace.

Chile competed at the 2011 Pan American Games in Guadalajara, Mexico from October 14 to 30, 2011.

== Medalists ==
| Medal | Name | Sport | Event | Date |
|---|---|---|---|---|
| Gold | Kristel Kobrich | Swimming | Women's 800 metre freestyle | October 19 |
| Gold | Alberto González; Diego González; Cristian Herman | Sailing | Lightning class | October 23 |
| Gold | Daniel Pineda | Athletics | Men's Long Jump | October 25 |
| Silver | Antonio Cabrera; Gonzalo Miranda; Pablo Seisdedos; Luis Sepúlveda | Cycling | Men's team pursuit | October 17 |
| Silver | Luis Mansilla | Cycling | Men's Omnium | October 19 |
| Silver | Francisca Crovetto | Shooting | Women's Skeet | October 21 |
| Silver | Andrea Koch; Guillermo Rivera | Tennis | Mixed Doubles | October 21 |
| Silver | Felipe Miranda | Water skiing | Men's overall | October 22 |
| Silver | Matias Del Solar | Sailing | Men's Laser class | October 23 |
| Silver | Barbara Riveros | Triathlon | Women's | October 23 |
| Silver | Rodrigo Miranda | Water skiing | Men's tricks | October 23 |
| Silver | Marisol Villaroel | Roller skating | Women's free skating | October 24 |
| Silver | Felipe Alvear | Fencing | Men's foil | October 25 |
| Silver | Emanuelle Silva | Roller skating | Men's 300 m time trial | October 26 |
| Silver | Maria Moya | Roller skating | Women's 300 m time trial | October 26 |
| Silver | Maria Valdes | Weightlifting | Women's 75 kg | October 26 |
| Silver | Tomas Gonzalez | Gymnastics | Men's floor | October 27 |
| Silver | Tomas Gonzalez | Gymnastics | Men's Vault | October 28 |
| Silver | Gabriela Bruna | Karate | Women's 50 kg | October 28 |
| Bronze | Carlos Oyarzun | Cycling | Men's road time trial | October 16 |
| Bronze | Esteban Bustos | Modern pentathlon | Men | October 16 |
| Bronze | Yeny Contreras | Taekwondo | Women's 57 kg | October 16 |
| Bronze | Mario Guerra | Taekwondo | Men's 68 kg | October 16 |
| Bronze | Gonzalo Moncada | Shooting | Men's 10 metre air rifle | October 17 |
| Bronze | Kristel Kobrich | Swimming | Women's 400 metre freestyle | October 17 |
| Bronze | Felipe Miranda; Fernando Miralles; Rodrigo Muñoz; Fabian Oyarzun | Rowing | Men's coxless four | October 19 |
| Bronze | Angela Grisar; Carla Muñoz | Racquetball | Women's doubles | October 21 |
| Bronze | Rodrigo Miranda | Water skiing | Men's overall | October 22 |
| Bronze | Matias Seguel; Cristobal Grez; Marc Jux; Juan Lira | Sailing | J/24 class | October 23 |
| Bronze | Felipe Miranda | Water skiing | Men's Jump | October 23 |
| Bronze | Felipe Miranda | Water skiing | Men's tricks | October 23 |
| Bronze | National handball Team | Handball | Men's tournament | October 24 |
| Bronze | Tomas Gonzalez | Gymnastics | Men's all-around | October 26 |
| Bronze | Claudia Vera | Karate | Women's 68 kg | October 27 |
| Bronze | Jorge Reyes | Roller skating | Men's 1000 m | October 27 |
| Bronze | Jorge Reyes | Roller skating | Men's 10000 m EP | October 27 |
| Bronze | Catherine Peñan | Roller skating | Women's 10000 m EP | October 27 |
| Bronze | Johnnathan Tafra | Canoeing | Men's C1 1000 metre | October 28 |
| Bronze | National Hockey Team | Field hockey | Women's tournament | October 28 |
| Bronze | Miguel Soffia | Karate | Men's 60 kg | October 28 |
| Bronze | National Hockey Team | Field hockey | Men's tournament | October 29 |
| Bronze | Jessy Reyes | Karate | Women's 55 kg | October 29 |
| Bronze | David Dubo | Karate | Men's 75 kg | October 29 |

| style="text-align:left; width:22%; vertical-align:top;"|

Medals by sport
| Sport | 1st place, gold medalist(s) | 2nd place, silver medalist(s) | 3rd place, bronze medalist(s) | Total |
| Sailing | 1 | 1 | 1 | 3 |
| Swimming | 1 | 0 | 1 | 2 |
| Athletics | 1 | 0 | 0 | 1 |
| Roller sports | 0 | 3 | 3 | 6 |
| Water skiing | 0 | 2 | 3 | 5 |
| Cycling | 0 | 2 | 1 | 3 |
| Gymnastics | 0 | 2 | 1 | 3 |
| Karate | 0 | 1 | 4 | 5 |
| Shooting | 0 | 1 | 1 | 2 |
| Fencing | 0 | 1 | 0 | 1 |
| Tenis | 0 | 1 | 0 | 1 |
| Triathlon | 0 | 1 | 0 | 1 |
| Weightlifting | 0 | 1 | 0 | 1 |
| Field hockey | 0 | 0 | 2 | 2 |
| Taekwondo | 0 | 0 | 2 | 2 |
| Canoeing | 0 | 0 | 1 | 1 |
| Handball | 0 | 0 | 1 | 1 |
| Modern Pentathlon | 0 | 0 | 1 | 1 |
| Racquetball | 0 | 0 | 1 | 1 |
| Rowing | 0 | 0 | 1 | 1 |
| Total | 3 | 16 | 24 | 43 |

Medals by day
| Day | 1st place, gold medalist(s) | 2nd place, silver medalist(s) | 3rd place, bronze medalist(s) | Total | | | | | |
| October 15 | 0 | 0 | 0 | 0 | | | | | |
| October 16 | 0 | 0 | 4 | 4 | | | | | |
| October 17 | 0 | 1 | 2 | 3 | | | | | |
| October 18 | 0 | 0 | 0 | 0 | | | | | |
| October 19 | 1 | 1 | 1 | 3 | | | | | |
| October 20 | 0 | 0 | 0 | 0 | | | | | |
| October 21 | 0 | 2 | 1 | 3 | | | | | |
| October 22 | 0 | 1 | 1 | 2 | | | | | |
| October 23 | 1 | 3 | 3 | 7 | | | | | |
| October 24 | 0 | 1 | 1 | 2 | | | | | |
| October 25 | 1 | 1 | 0 | 2 | | | | | |
| October 26 | 0 | 3 | 1 | 4 | | | | | |
| October 27 | 0 | 1 | 4 | 5 | | | | | |
| October 28 | 0 | 2 | 3 | 5 | | | | | |
| October 29 | 0 | 0 | 3 | 3 | | | | | |
| October 30 | 0 | 0 | 0 | 0 | Total | 3 | 16 | 24 | 43 |

Medals by gender
| Gender | 1st place, gold medalist(s) | 2nd place, silver medalist(s) | 3rd place, bronze medalist(s) | Total |
| Male | 2 | 9 | 17 | 28 |
| Female | 1 | 6 | 7 | 14 |
| Mixed | 0 | 1 | 0 | 1 |
| Total | 3 | 16 | 24 | 43 |

Multiple medalists
| Name | Sport | 1st place, gold medalist(s) | 2nd place, silver medalist(s) | 3rd place, bronze medalist(s) | Total |
| Kristel Kobrich | Swimming | 1 | 0 | 1 | 2 |
| Tomas González | Gymnastics | 0 | 2 | 1 | 3 |
| Felipe Miranda | Water Skiing | 0 | 1 | 2 | 3 |
| Rodrigo Miranda | Water Skiing | 0 | 1 | 1 | 2 |
| Jorge Reyes | Roller sports | 0 | 0 | 2 | 2 |

== Archery ==
Chile has qualified two male and three female archers.

Men

| Athlete | Event | Ranking Round | | Round of 32 | Round of 16 | Quarterfinals | Semifinals | Final |
| Athlete | Event | Score | Seed | Opposition Score | Opposition Score | Opposition Score | Opposition Score | Opposition Score |
|---|---|---|---|---|---|---|---|---|
| Christian Medina | Men's individual | 1229 | 25 | Pedro Vivas (MEX); L 4 – 6 | Did not advance | | | |
| Mario Valdes | Men's individual | 1161 | 30 | Daniel Pineda (COL); L 1 – 7 | Did not advance | | | |

Women

| Athlete | Event | Ranking Round | | Round of 32 | Round of 16 | Quarterfinals | Semifinals | Final |
| Athlete | Event | Score | Seed | Opposition Score | Opposition Score | Opposition Score | Opposition Score | Opposition Score |
|---|---|---|---|---|---|---|---|---|
| Denisse van Lamoen | Women's individual | 1280 | 9 | Vanessa Lee (CAN); W 6 – 2 | Maria Goni (ARG); W 6 – 4 | Alejandra Valencia (MEX); L 5 – 6 | Did not advance | |
| Murielle Deschamps | Women's individual | 1214 | 23 | Heather Koehl (USA); L 5 – 6 | Did not advance | | | |
| Sophia Moraga | Women's individual | 1174 | 31 | Miranda Leek (USA); L 0–6 | Did not advance | | | |
| Murielle Deschamps; Sophia Moraga; Denisse van Lamoen | Women's team | 3668 | 7 | | Brazil; W 193 – 186 | United States; L 201 – 204 | Did not advance | |

== Athletics ==
=== Track and road events ===
| Event | Athletes | Heats | | Semifinal | | Final | |
| Event | Athletes | Time | Rank | Time | Rank | Time | Rank |
|---|---|---|---|---|---|---|---|
| 100 m | Kael Becerra | 10.49 | 19 | Did not advance | | | |
| 200 m | Kael Becerra | 21.04 | 18 QS | 21.23 | 21 | Did not advance | |
| 200 m | Cristian Reyes | 20.83 | 9 qS | 20.65 PB | 7 qF | 20.97 | 8° |
| 1500 m | Leslie Encina | | | | | 3:56.69 | 10° |
| 3000 m steeplechase | Enzo Yañez | | | | | 9:07.63 | 9° |
| 4 × 100 m relay | Ignacio Rojas; Cristian Reyes; Kael Becerra; Daniel Pineda | | | 39.68 NR | 4 Q | Did not finish | |
| 20 km walk | Yerko Araya | | | | | DSQ | |
| 50 km walk | Edward Araya | | | | | DSQ | |

=== Field events ===
| Event | Athletes | Semifinal | | Final | |
| Event | Athletes | Result | Rank | Result | Rank |
|---|---|---|---|---|---|
| Long jump | Daniel Pineda | 7.77 m. | 5 q | 7.97 m. | 1st place, gold medalist(s) |
| Javelin throw | Ignacio Guerra | | | NM | |

=== Combined events ===
| Decathlon | Event | Gonzalo Barroilhet | | |
| Decathlon | Event | Results | Points | Rank |
|---|---|---|---|---|
| | 100 m | 11.06 | 847 | 10 |
| | Long jump | 7.05 m. | 826 | 8 |
| | Shot put | 14.21 m. PB | 729 | 5 |
| | High jump | 2.05 m. PB | 850 | 2 |
| | 400 m | 51.02 | 768 | 9 |
| | 110 m hurdles | 14.23 | 945 | 4 |
| | Discus throw | 43.40 m. PB | 734 | 5 |
| | Pole vault | 5.30 m. | 1004 | 1 |
| | Javelin throw | 56.24 m. | 681 | 8 |
| | 1500 m | 4:54.34 | 593 | 7 |
| Final | | | 7986 PB | 4° |

=== Track and road events ===
| Event | Athletes | Semifinal | | Final | |
| Event | Athletes | Result | Rank | Result | Rank |
|---|---|---|---|---|---|
| 100 m | Daniela Claudia Pavez | 11.85 | 15 | Did not advance | |
| Marathon | Érika Olivera | | | 2:44:06 | 5° |
| Marathon | Michele Chagas | | | 2:47:35 | 7° |

=== Field events ===
| Event | Athletes | Final | |
| Event | Athletes | Result | Rank |
|---|---|---|---|
| Long jump | Daniela Pávez | 5.99 m. | 10° |
| Shot put | Natalia Duco | 17.56 m. | 5° |
| Discus throw | Karen Gallardo | 57.17 m. | 5° |
| Hammer throw | Odette Palma | 64.79 m. | 7° |

== Badminton ==
Chile has qualified three male and three female athletes in the individual and team competitions.

Men

| Athlete | Event | First round | Second round | Third round | Quarterfinals | Semifinals | Final | Rank |
| Athlete | Event | Opposition Result | Opposition Result | Opposition Result | Opposition Result | Opposition Result | Opposition Result | Rank |
|---|---|---|---|---|---|---|---|---|
| Esteban Mujica | Men's singles | BYE | A Raposo (DOM); L 0–2 (13–21, 14–21) | Did not advance | | | | |
| Andres Trigo | Men's singles | BYE | R Ramírez (GUA); L 0–2 (8–21, 5–21) | Did not advance | | | | |
| Cristian Araya | Men's singles | BYE | D Darmohoetomo (SUR); W 2–0 (21–17, 21–17) | A Tjong (BRA); L 0–2 (13–21, 14–21) | Did not advance | | | |
| Cristian Araya; Esteban Mujica | Men's doubles | | | J Lazo (VEN); L Uzcategui (VEN); W 2–0 (21–10, 21–6) | A López (MEX); L Muñoz (MEX); L 0–2 (11–21, 15–21) | Did not advance | | |

Women

| Athlete | Event | First round | Second round | Third round | Quarterfinals | Semifinals | Final | Rank |
| Athlete | Event | Opposition Result | Opposition Result | Opposition Result | Opposition Result | Opposition Result | Opposition Result | Rank |
|---|---|---|---|---|---|---|---|---|
| Natalia Villegas | Women's singles | BYE | C Aicardi (PER); L 0–2 (19–21, 9–21) | Did not advance | | | | |
| Chou Ting Ting | Women's singles | BYE | D Santana (PUR); L 0–2 (14–21, 14–21) | Did not advance | | | | |
| Camila Macaya; Natalia Villegas | Women's doubles | | BYE | G Gao (CAN); J Ko (CAN); L 0–2 (5–21, 14–21) | Did not advance | | | |

Mixed

| Athlete | Event | First round | Second round | Quarterfinals | Semifinals | Final | Rank |
| Athlete | Event | Opposition Result | Opposition Result | Opposition Result | Opposition Result | Opposition Result | Rank |
|---|---|---|---|---|---|---|---|
| Cristian Araya; Camila Macaya | Mixed doubles | G Henry (JAM); M Haldane (JAM); L 0–2 (15–21, 15–21) | Did not advance | | | | |
| Esteban Mujica; Natalia Villegas | Mixed doubles | C Pyne (JAM); K Wynter (JAM); L 0–2 (19–21, 17–21) | Did not advance | | | | |

== Basque pelota ==
Chile has qualified two athletes each in the paleta rubber pairs trinkete, paleta leather pairs trinkete, paleta leather pairs leather 30m fronton, frontenis pairs 30m fronton, women's paleta rubber pairs trinkete, and women's frontenis pairs 30m fronton competitions.

Men

| Athlete(s) | Event | Series 1 | Series 2 | Series 3 | Series 4 | Medal round | Rank |
| Athlete(s) | Event | Opposition Score | Opposition Score | Opposition Score | Opposition Score | Opposition Score | Rank |
|---|---|---|---|---|---|---|---|
| Sebastian De Orte; Esteban Romero | Paleta Rubber Pairs Trinkete | A Raya (MEX) & G Verdeja; L 0-2 | C Buzzo (URU) & E Cazzola; L 0-2 | F Andreasen (ARG) & S Villegas; L 0-2 | J Pina (VEN) & J Zarraga; W 2-0 | Bronze medal A Raya (MEX) & G Verdeja; L 0-2 | 4° |
| Sebastian Perez; Raimundo Sáez | Paleta Leather Pairs Trinkete | P Baldizan (URU) & G Dufau; L 0-2 | C Algarbe (ARG) & J Villegas; L 0-2 | J Herrera (MEX) & J Marin; L 0-2 | F Fernandez (CUB) & A Jardines; L 0-2 | Did not advance | 5° |
| Fernando Celaya; Pedro De Orte | Paleta Rubber Pairs 30m Fronton | O Bustillo (NCA) & V Bustillo; W 2-0 | F Ergueta (ARG) & J Nicosia; L 0-2 | T Fernandez (CRC) & J Lopez; W 2-0 | E Blas (GUA) & J Blas; W 2-0 | Bronze medal J Fiffe (CUB) & J Torreblanca; L 0-2 | 4° |
| Ignacio Trucco; Francisco Versluys | Frontenis Pairs 30m Fronton | J Alberdi (ARG) & A Clementin; L 1-2 | A Rodriguez (MEX) & A Rodriguez; L 0-2 | D Alonso (CUB) & C Rafael; L 0-2 | D Delgado (USA) & R Tejeda; L 0-2 | Did not advance | 5° |

Women

| Athlete(s) | Event | Series 1 | Series 2 | Series 3 | Series 4 | Medal round | Rank |
| Athlete(s) | Event | Opposition Score | Opposition Score | Opposition Score | Opposition Score | Opposition Score | Rank |
|---|---|---|---|---|---|---|---|
| Daniela Apablaza; Zita Solas | Paleta Rubber Pairs Trinkete | M Miranda (URU) & C Naviliat; L 0-2 | M Garcia (ARG) & V Stele; L 0-2 | A Cepeda (MEX) & R Guillen; L 0-2 | Y Medina (CUB) & Y Allue; W 2-0 | Bronze medal A Cepeda (MEX) & R Guillen; L 0-2 | 4° |
| Natalia Bozzo; Andrea Salgado | Frontenis Pairs 30m Fronton | L Lim (CUB) & Y Medina; L 0-2 | P Castillo (MEX) & G Hernandez; L 0-2 | I Podversich (ARG) & J Zair; L 1-2 | R Diaz (VEN) & P Toro; L 0-2 | Did not advance | 5° |

== Beach volleyball ==
Chile has qualified a men's pair and women's pair in the beach volleyball competitions.

| Athlete | Event | Preliminary round | | | Quarterfinals | Semifinals | Finals |
| Athlete | Event | Opposition Score | Opposition Score | Opposition Score | Opposition Score | Opposition Score | Opposition Score |
|---|---|---|---|---|---|---|---|
| Esteban Grimalt; Marco Grimalt | Men | Jeovanny Medrano (ESA); David Vargas (ESA); W 21-11, 21-7 | Andrew Barnett Fuller (USA); Mark Van Zwieter (USA); L 16-21, 12-21 | Igor Hernández (VEN); Farid Mussa (VEN); L 18-21, 21-16, 16-18 | Did not advance | | |
| Camila Pazdirek; Francisca Rivas | Men | Andrea Galindo (COL); Claudia Galindo (COL); L 12-21, 13-21 | Emily Day (USA); Heather Hughes (USA); L 10-21, 7-21 | María Orellana (GUA); Anna Ramírez (GUA); L 17-21, 8-21 | Did not advance | | |

== Bowling ==
Chile has qualified two female bowlers to compete in the individual and team competitions.

=== Women ===
Individual

| Athlete | Event | Qualification | | | | | | | | | | | | | | | Eighth Finals | Quarterfinals | Semifinals | Finals |
| Athlete | Event | Block 1 (games 1–6) | | | | | | Block 2 (games 7–12) | | | | | | Total | Average | Rank | Eighth Finals | Quarterfinals | Semifinals | Finals |
| Athlete | Event | 1 | 2 | 3 | 4 | 5 | 6 | 7 | 8 | 9 | 10 | 11 | 12 | Total | Average | Rank | Opposition Scores | Opposition Scores | Opposition Scores | Opposition Scores |
|---|---|---|---|---|---|---|---|---|---|---|---|---|---|---|---|---|---|---|---|---|
| Andrea Rojas | Women's individual | 204 | 186 | 206 | 222 | 183 | 203 | 202 | 148 | 175 | 221 | 187 | 188 | 2325 | 193.8 | 12 | Marizete Scheer (BRA); L 542 – 548 | Did not advance | | |
| Constanza Bahamondez | Women's individual | 198 | 200 | 196 | 183 | 177 | 183 | 159 | 181 | 159 | 222 | 154 | 203 | 2215 | 184.6 | 17 | Did not advance | | | |

Pairs

| Athlete | Event | Block 1 (games 1–6) | | | | | | | | Block 2 (games 7–12) | | | | | | | | Grand total | Final rank |
| Athlete | Event | 1 | 2 | 3 | 4 | 5 | 6 | Total | Average | 7 | 8 | 9 | 10 | 11 | 12 | Total | Average | Grand total | Final rank |
|---|---|---|---|---|---|---|---|---|---|---|---|---|---|---|---|---|---|---|---|
| Constanza Bahamondez; Andrea Rojas | Women's pairs | 204 | 203 | 190 | 187 | 189 | 210 | 1183 | 197.2 | 161 | 153 | 137 | 187 | 188 | 161 | 2170 | 180.8 | 4464 | 8° |
| Constanza Bahamondez; Andrea Rojas | Women's pairs | 224 | 192 | 168 | 189 | 177 | 182 | 1132 | 188.7 | 170 | 205 | 209 | 175 | 224 | 179 | 2294 | 191.2 | 4464 | 8° |

== Boxing ==
Chile has qualified one boxer in the 69 kg men's category.

=== Men ===
| Athlete | Event | Preliminaries | Quarterfinals | Semifinals | Final |
| Athlete | Event | Opposition Result | Opposition Result | Opposition Result | Opposition Result |
|---|---|---|---|---|---|
| Patricio Villagra | Welterweight | Myke M. De Carvalho (BRA); L 30 – 8 | Did not advance | | |

== Canoeing ==
Chile has qualified two boats in the C-1 200 and the C-1 1000 competitions.

=== Men ===
| Athlete(s) | Event | Heats | | Semifinals | | Final | |
| Athlete(s) | Event | Time | Rank | Time | Rank | Time | Rank |
|---|---|---|---|---|---|---|---|
| Johnnatan Tafra | C-1 1000 m | | | | | 4:05.323 | 3rd place, bronze medalist(s) |
| Álvaro Torres | C-1 200 m | 41.945 | 3rd QF | | | 42.402 | 5° |

=== Women ===
| Athlete(s) | Event | Heats | | Semifinals | | Final | |
| Athlete(s) | Event | Time | Rank | Time | Rank | Time | Rank |
|---|---|---|---|---|---|---|---|
| Ysumy Orellana | K-1 200 m | 44.837 | 5 R | 44.480 | 4 | Did not advance | |
| Ysumy Orellana; Fabiola Zamorano | K-2 500 m | 1:56.389 | 5 R | 1:54.278 | 2 QF | 1:54.479 | 8° |

== Cycling ==
=== Road Cycling ===
==== Men ====
| Athlete | Event | Time | Rank |
|---|---|---|---|
| Arnold Olavarria | Road race | 3:41:48 | 4° |
| Gonzalo Garrido | Road race | 3:45:06 | 20° |
| Luis Mansilla | Road race | 3:50:58 | 34° |
| Andrey Sartasov | Road race | 3:45:06 | 39° |
| Carlos Oyarzun | Time trial | 50:27.60 | 3rd place, bronze medalist(s) |

==== Women ====
| Athlete | Event | Time | Rank |
|---|---|---|---|
| Paola Muñoz | Road race | 2:18:23 | 8° |
| Olga Cisterna | Road race | 2:18:29 | 23° |
| Daniela Guajardo | Road race | 2:18:29 | 26° |
| Francisca Navarro | Time trial | 30:05.94 | 12° |

=== Track Cycling ===
==== Sprints & Pursuit ====
| Athlete | Event | Qualifying | | Round of 16 | 1/8 finals (repechage) | Quarterfinals | Semifinals | Final |
| Athlete | Event | Time Speed (km/h) | Rank | Opposition Time Speed | Opposition Time Speed | Opposition Time Speed | Opposition Time Speed | Opposition Time Speed |
|---|---|---|---|---|---|---|---|---|
| Cristopher Mansilla | Men's sprint | 10.601 | 13 | Did not advance | | | | |
| Antonio Roberto Cabrera; Gonzalo Miranda; Pablo Seisdedos; Luis Fernando Sepúlveda | Men's team pursuit | 4:03.882 | 2 | | | | | Gold medal match: Colombia; L OVL (silver) |
| Daniela Guajardo; Francisca Navarro; Claudia Aravena | Women's team pursuit | 3:37.730 | 6 | | | | | Did not advance |

==== Keirin ====
| Athlete | Event | 1st round | Repechage | Final |
| Cristopher Mansilla | Men's keirin | 4 R | 1 F | 5° |

==== Omnium ====
| Athlete | Event | Flying Lap Time Rank | Points Race Points Rank | Elimination Race Rank | Ind Pursuit Time | Scratch Race Rank | Time Trial Time | Final Rank |
|---|---|---|---|---|---|---|---|---|
| Luis Mansilla | Men | 13.515; 3 | 17; 6 | 1 | 4:32.802; 4 | -1; 4 | 1:04.015; 2 | 20 (silver) |
| Paola Muñoz | Women | 15.266; 6 | 12; 8 | 3 | 3:49.970; 6 | 3 | 36.901; 3 | 29; 6° |

=== Mountain Biking ===
Men

| Athlete | Event | Time | Rank |
|---|---|---|---|
| Ricardo Hazbun | Cross-country | 1:42:00 | 12° |
| Javier Puschel | Cross-country | DNF | |

Women

| Athlete | Event | Time | Rank |
|---|---|---|---|
| Elisa Garcia | Cross-country | 1:41:13 | 7° |

=== BMX ===
| Athlete | Event | Qualifying Run 1 | | Qualifying Run 2 | | Qualifying Run 3 | | Qualifying | Semifinal | | Final | |
| Athlete | Event | Time | Points | Time | Points | Time | Points | Points | Points | Rank | Time | Rank |
|---|---|---|---|---|---|---|---|---|---|---|---|---|
| Felipe Faundez | Men | 37.394 | 4 | 1:26.702 | 5 | 49.207 | 5 | 14 | Did not advance | | | |
| Isaías Zapata | Men | 37.028 | 3 | 38.486 | 5 | 37.512 | 5 | 13 | Did not advance | | | |
| Belen Tapia | Women | 48.212 | 5 | 47.486 | 5 | 47.152 | 5 | 15 | | | Did not advance | |

== Diving ==
=== Men ===
| Athlete(s) | Event | Preliminary | | Final | |
| Athlete(s) | Event | Points | Rank | Points | Rank |
|---|---|---|---|---|---|
| Diego Carquin | 3 m springboard | DNF | | Did not advance | |
| Donato Neglia | 3 m springboard | 256.15 | 15 | Did not advance | |
| Diego Carquin; Donato Neglia | 3 m synchronized springboard | | | 317.04 | 8° |

=== Women ===
| Athlete(s) | Event | Preliminary | | Final | |
| Athlete(s) | Event | Points | Rank | Points | Rank |
|---|---|---|---|---|---|
| Paula Sotomayor | 3 m springboard | 194.80 | 13 | Did not advance | |
| Paula Sotomayor; Wendy Espina | 3 m synchronized springboard | | | 217.44 | 5° |

== Equestrian ==
=== Dressage ===
| Athlete | Horse | Event | Grand Prix | | Grand Prix Special | | Grand Prix Freestyle | | Final score |
| Athlete | Horse | Event | Score | Rank | Score | Rank | Score | Rank | Final score |
|---|---|---|---|---|---|---|---|---|---|
| Mario Vargas | Tejas Verdes Tylov | Individual | 67.316 | 15 Q | 67.316 | 21 | Did not advance | | |
| Max Piraino | Jaguar | Individual | 61.158 | 36 | Did not advance | | | | |
| Oscar Coddou | Tambo Merlin | Individual | 60.816 | 39 | Did not advance | | | | |
| Virginia Yarur | El Dorado | Individual | 60.658 | 41 | Did not advance | | | | |
| Mario Vargas; Max Piraino; Oscar Coddou; Virginia Yarur | Tejas Verdes Tylov; Jaguar; Tambo Merlin; El Dorado | Team | 63.097 | 10° | | | | | |

=== Eventing ===
| Athlete | Horse | Event | Dressage | | Cross-country | | Jumping | | | | Total | |
| Athlete | Horse | Event | Dressage | | Cross-country | | Qualifier | | Final | | Total | |
| Athlete | Horse | Event | Penalties | Rank | Penalties | Rank | Penalties | Rank | Penalties | Rank | Penalties | Rank |
|---|---|---|---|---|---|---|---|---|---|---|---|---|
| Felipe Martinez | Navideño | Individual | 56.30 | 16 | EL | | Did not advance | | | | | |
| Jose Ibañez | Amil Fuego | Individual | 56.50 | 17 | EL | | Did not advance | | | | | |
| Sergio Iturriaga | Lago Rupanco | Individual | 59.60 | '25 | 12.40 | 17 | 4.00 | 15 | 0.00 | 11 | 76.00 | 11° |
| Carlos Lobos | Ranco | Individual | 59.80 | 26 | 12.80 | 19 | 0.00 | 13 | 0.00 | 10 | 72.60 | 10° |
| Ricardo Stangher | Halesco | Individual | 62.60 | 30 | EL | | Did not advance | | | | | |
| Felipe Martinez; Jose Ibañez; Sergio Iturriaga; Carlos Lobos; Ricardo Stangher | Navideño; Amil Fuego; Lago Rupanco; Ranco; Halesco | Team | 172.40 | 4 | 972.20 | 7 | 4.00 | 6 | | | 1148.60 | 6° |

=== Individual jumping ===
| Athlete | Horse | Event | Ind. 1st Qualifier | | Ind. 2nd Qualifier | | | Ind. 3rd Qualifier | | | Ind. Final | | | | | |
| Athlete | Horse | Event | Ind. 1st Qualifier | | Ind. 2nd Qualifier | | | Ind. 3rd Qualifier | | | Round A | | Round B | | Total | |
| Athlete | Horse | Event | Penalties | Rank | Penalties | Total | Rank | Penalties | Total | Rank | Penalties | Rank | Penalties | Rank | Penalties | Rank |
|---|---|---|---|---|---|---|---|---|---|---|---|---|---|---|---|---|
| Samuel Parot | Al Calypso | Individual | 4.00 | 16 | 8.00 | 12.00 | 23 | 1.00 | 13.00 | 17 | 5.00 | 15 | 8.00 | 13 | 26.00 | 13° |
| Tomas Couve | Arc en Ciel de Muze | Individual | 4.87 | 18 | 0.00 | 4.87 | 10 | 1.00 | 5.87 | 10 | 1.00 | 7 | 4.00 | 6 | 10.87 | 6° |
| Rodrigo Carrasco | Or de la Charboniere | Individual | 5.65 | 25 | 8.00 | 13.65 | 25 | 0.00 | 13.65 | 19 | 1.00 | 12 | 4.00 | 10 | 18.65 | 10° |
| Carlos Morstadt | Talento | Individual | 6.01 | 30 | 8.00 | 14.01 | 28 | 4.00 | 18.01 | 26 | Did not advance | | | | | |

=== Team jumping ===
| Athlete | Horse | Event | Qualification Round | | Final | | | | | |
| Athlete | Horse | Event | Qualification Round | | Round 1 | | Round 2 | | Total | |
| Athlete | Horse | Event | Penalties | Rank | Penalties | Rank | Penalties | Rank | Penalties | Rank |
|---|---|---|---|---|---|---|---|---|---|---|
| Samuel Parot; Tomas Couve; Rodrigo Carrasco; Carlos Morstadt | Al Calypso; Arc en Ciel de Muze; Or de la Charboniere; Talento | Team | 14.52 | 7 | 16.00 | 6 | 2.00 | 5 | 32.52 | 5° |

== Fencing ==
Chile has qualified men's and women's teams in the épée and foil competitions and a men's team in the sabre competitions.

=== Men ===
| Event | Athlete | Round of Poules | | Round of 16 | Quarterfinals | Semifinals | Final |
| Event | Athlete | Result | Seed | Opposition Score | Opposition Score | Opposition Score | Opposition Score |
|---|---|---|---|---|---|---|---|
| Individual épée | Paris Inostroza | 4 V – 1 D | 3 Q | Gerson Ramirez (ESA); W 15 – 3 | Weston Kelsey (USA); L 8 – 12 | Did not advance | |
| Individual épée | Rolf Nickel | 2 V – 3 D | 13 Q | Soren Thompson (USA); L 9 – 15 | Did not advance | | |
| Individual foil | Felipe Alvear | 2 V – 3 D | 10 Q | Rubén Silva (CHI); W 13 – 12 | Daniel Gomez (MEX); W 15 – 12 | Antonio Leal (VEN); W 15 – 14 | Alexander Massialas (USA); L 5 – 15 (silver) |
| Individual foil | Rubén Silva | 3 V – 2 D | 7 Q | Felipe Alvear (CHI); L 12 – 13 | Did not advance | | |
| Individual sabre | Victor Contreras | 1 V – 4 D | 14 Q | Timothy Morehouse (USA); L 10 – 15 | Did not advance | | |
| Individual sabre | Israel Vázquez | 0 V – 5 D | 18 | Did not advance | | | |
| Team épée | Paris Inostroza; Rolf Nickel; Klaus Nickel | | | | Colombia; W 40 – 38 | United States; L 26 – 45 | Bronze medal match Canada; L 27 – 45 |
| Team foil | Rubén Silva; Felipe Alvear; Pablo Alvear | | | | Brazil; L 31 – 45 | 5-8 Place match: Colombia; L 29 – 45 | 7-8 Place match Argentina; W 45 – 37 |
| Team sabre | Victor Contreras; Israel Vázquez; Rodrigo Araya | | | | Brazil; L 19 – 45 | 5-8 Place match: Cuba; L 29 – 45 | 7-8 Place match Argentina; L 36 – 45 |

=== Women ===
| Event | Athlete | Round of Poules | | Round of 16 | Quarterfinals | Semifinals | Final |
| Event | Athlete | Result | Seed | Opposition Score | Opposition Score | Opposition Score | Opposition Score |
|---|---|---|---|---|---|---|---|
| Individual foil | Paula Silva | 3 V – 2 D | 9 Q | Nzingha Prescod (USA); L 10 – 15 | Did not advance | | |
| Individual foil | Barbara Garcia | 1 V – 4 D | 15 Q | Lee Kiefer (USA); L 9 – 15 | Did not advance | | |
| Individual épée | Cáterin Bravo | 3 V – 2 D | 9 Q | Eliana Lugo (VEN); L 11 – 12 | Did not advance | | |
| Individual épée | Pía Montecinos | 3 V – 2 D | 10 Q | Andrea Millan (MEX); L 8 – 15 | Did not advance | | |
| Team foil | Barbara Garcia; Paula Silva; Alejandra Muñoz | | | | Brazil; W 45 – 43 | United States; L 21 – 45 | Bronze medal match Venezuela; L 23 – 45 |
| Team foil | Pía Montecinos; Cáterin Bravo; María Ramirez | | | | Canada; L 35 – 45 | 5-8 Place Match; Venezuela; W 45 – 41 | 5-6 Place Match; Cuba; L 39 – 45 |

== Field hockey ==
Chile has qualified a men's and women's field hockey team.

=== Men ===
Team

- Mathias Anwandter
- Alexis Berczely
- Fernando Binder
- Andres Fuenzalida
- Raul Garces
- Adrian Henriquez
- Thomas Kannegiesser
- Sebastian Kapsch
- Esteban Krainz
- Kan Richter
- Sven Richter
- Juan Cristóbal Rodríguez
- Martin Rodriguez
- Raimundo Valenzuela
- Jaime Zarhi
- Jose Zirpel

Standings

| Pos | Team | Pld | W | D | L | GF | GA | GD | Pts | Qualification |
|---|---|---|---|---|---|---|---|---|---|---|
| 1 | Canada | 3 | 3 | 0 | 0 | 21 | 2 | +19 | 9 | Semi-finals |
| 2 | Chile | 3 | 2 | 0 | 1 | 12 | 6 | +6 | 6 | Semi-finals |
| 3 | Trinidad and Tobago | 3 | 1 | 0 | 2 | 14 | 11 | +3 | 3 | |
| 4 | Barbados | 3 | 0 | 0 | 3 | 2 | 30 | −28 | 0 | |

Source: PAHF

Results

October 20, 2011
11:00

| Chile | 9 – 1 | Barbados |
|---|---|---|
| Richter 3', 13', 22', 50'; Rodriguez 8'; Krainz 51', 67'; Richter 53'; Berczely 67' | Report | Forde 42' |

Pan American Hockey Stadium
Umpires:
Vazquez (MEX), Scala (ARG)

October 22, 2011
16:00

| Chile | 0 – 4 | Canada |
|---|---|---|
| | Report | Tupper 15', 49', 56'; Short 61' |

Pan American Hockey Stadium
Umpires:
Lopez (URU), Barbas (ARG)

October 24, 2011
11:00

| Trinidad and Tobago | 1 – 3 | Chile |
|---|---|---|
| Whittington 36' | Report | Richter 15'; Richter 51'; Rodriguez 65' |

Pan American Hockey Stadium
Umpires:
Wright (RSA), Hundley (USA)

Semi-finals

October 27, 2011
15:00

| Chile | 1 – 7 | Argentina |
|---|---|---|
| Berczely 60' | Report | Bergner 7'; L. Vila 27', 65'; Rey 33'; Ibarra 34'; M. Vila 49', 69' |

Pan American Hockey Stadium
Umpires:
Wilson (CAN), Lim (SIN)

Bronze medal match

October 29, 2011
15:00

| Cuba | 3 – 4 | Chile |
|---|---|---|
| Sarduy 9'; Blanco 52', 55' | Report | Zarhi 19'; Zirpel 23'; Richter 32'; Berczely 69' |

Pan American Hockey Stadium
Umpires:
Barbas (ARG), Soteriades II (USA)

=== Women ===
Team

- Catalina Cabach
- Camila Caram
- Daniela Caram
- Maria Fernandez
- Christine Fingerhuth
- Carolina Garcia
- Daniela Infante
- Denise Infante
- Paula Infante
- Jodefina Khamis
- Claudia Schuler
- Catalina Thiermann
- Manuela Urroz
- Javiera Villagra
- Sofia Walbaum
- Michelle Wilson

Standings

| Team | Pld | W | D | L | GF | GA | GD | Pts |
|---|---|---|---|---|---|---|---|---|
| United States (A) | 3 | 3 | 0 | 0 | 16 | 1 | +15 | 9 |
| Chile (A) | 3 | 2 | 0 | 1 | 8 | 2 | +6 | 6 |
| Cuba | 3 | 1 | 0 | 2 | 3 | 16 | −13 | 3 |
| Mexico | 3 | 0 | 0 | 3 | 1 | 9 | −8 | 0 |

(A) Advanced to the semifinals

Results

October 19, 2011
16:00

| Chile | 6 – 0 | Cuba |
|---|---|---|
| Urroz 5'; Fernandez 16'; Infante 23'; Villagra 41' 56'; Fingerhuth 58' | Report |

Pan American Hockey Stadium

October 21, 2011
11:00

| Chile | 1 – 2 | United States |
|---|---|---|
| Caram 46' | Report | Taylor 41'; Nichols 42' |

Pan American Hockey Stadium
Umpires:
De La Fuente (ARG), Perez (USA)

October 23, 2011
16:00

| Mexico | 0 – 1 | Chile |
|---|---|---|
| | Report | Khamis 63' |

Pan American Hockey Stadium
Umpires:
Cheng (TPE), Stewart (CAN)

Semi-finals

October 26, 2011
11:00

| Argentina | 4 – 0 | Chile |
|---|---|---|
| Luchetti 5'; García 22'; Aymar 47'; Merino 56' | Report |

Pan American Hockey Stadium
Umpires:
Stewart (CAN), Hudson (NZL)

Bronze medal match

October 28, 2011
15:00

| Chile | 3 – 0 | Canada |
|---|---|---|
| Urroz 27'; Caram 42'; Infante 67' | Report |

Pan American Hockey Stadium
Umpires:
Hudson (NZL), De La Fuente (ARG)

== Football ==
Chile has qualified a women's team in the football competition.

=== Women ===
==== Squad ====
- Yanara Aedo
- Yorky Arriagada
- Natalia Campos
- Nicole Cornejo
- Claudia Endler
- Daniela Fuenzalida
- Su Helen Galaz
- Javiera Guajardo
- Carla Guerrero
- Yessenia Huenteo
- Francisca Lara
- Francisca Mardones
- Adriana Moya
- Tatiana Perez
- Maria Rojas
- Camila Sáez
- Rocio Soto
- Daniela Zamora

==== Standings ====
| Pos | Team | Pld | W | D | L | GF | GA | GD | Pts | Qualification |
|---|---|---|---|---|---|---|---|---|---|---|
| 1 | Colombia | 3 | 2 | 0 | 1 | 2 | 1 | +1 | 6 | Advance to Semifinals |
| 2 | Mexico | 3 | 1 | 2 | 0 | 2 | 1 | +1 | 5 | Advance to Semifinals |
| 3 | Chile | 3 | 1 | 1 | 1 | 3 | 1 | +2 | 4 | |
| 4 | Trinidad and Tobago | 3 | 0 | 1 | 2 | 1 | 5 | −4 | 1 | |

==== Results ====
October 18, 2011
21:00

| Mexico | 0 – 0 | Chile |
|---|---|---|
| | Report |

Estadio Omnilife, Guadalajara
Referee: Diane Ferreiras (Guyana)

October 20, 2011
14:00

| Chile | 0 – 1 | Colombia |
|---|---|---|
| | Report | Rincón 3' |

Estadio Omnilife, Guadalajara
Referee: Lucila Venegas (Mexico)

October 22, 2011
10:00

| Trinidad and Tobago | 0 – 3 | Chile |
|---|---|---|
| | Report | Lara 18'; Mardones 40'; Rojas 65' |

Estadio Omnilife, Guadalajara
Referee: Jessica Di Orio (Argentina)

== Gymnastics ==
=== Artistic ===
Chile has qualified two male and female athletes in the artistic gymnastics competition.

Men

Individual qualification & Team Finals

| Athlete | Event | Apparatus | | | | | | Qualification | |
| Athlete | Event | Floor | Pommel horse | Rings | Vault | Parallel bars | Horizontal bar | Total | Rank |
|---|---|---|---|---|---|---|---|---|---|
| Enrique Gonzalez | Ind Qualification | 15.050 | 13.000 | 14.300 | 16.150 | 14.300 | 13.650 | 86.450 | 4 |
| Juan Pablo Gonzalez | Ind Qualification | 13.900 | | | 15.150 | | | 29.050 | 55 |

Individual Finals

| Athlete | Event | Apparatus | | | | Final | | | |
| Athlete | Event | Floor | Pommel horse | Rings | Vault | Parallel bars | Horizontal bar | Total | Rank |
|---|---|---|---|---|---|---|---|---|---|
| Enrique Gonzalez | Individual All-around | 15.050 | 13.250 | 14.200 | 15.450 | 14.250 | 13.850 | 86.050 | 3rd place, bronze medalist(s) |
| Enrique Gonzalez | Individual Floor | 15.625 | | | | | | 15.625 | 2nd place, silver medalist(s) |
| Enrique Gonzalez | Individual Rings | | | 14.250 | | | | 14.250 | 7° |
| Enrique Gonzalez | Individual Vault | | | | 15.587 | | | 15.587 | 2nd place, silver medalist(s) |

Women
Individual qualification & Team Finals

| Athlete | Event | Apparatus | | | | Qualification | |
| Athlete | Event | Vault | Uneven bars | Balance Beam | Floor | Total | Rank |
|---|---|---|---|---|---|---|---|
| Martina Castro | Ind Qualification | 13.475 | 9.000 | 12.950 | 12.650 | 48.075 | 35 |
| Makarena Pinto | Ind Qualification | 13.150 | 12.175 | 12.450 | 11.975 | 49.750 | 29 |

Individual Finals

| Athlete | Event | Apparatus | | | | Final | |
| Athlete | Event | Vault | Uneven bars | Balance Beam | Floor | Total | Rank |
|---|---|---|---|---|---|---|---|
| Martina Castro | Ind Qualification | 12.750 | 9.925 | 11.150 | 12.550 | 45.350 | 22° |

=== Rhythmic ===
Chile has qualified one athlete in the individual rhythmic gymnastics competition.

Individual

All Around

| Athlete | Event | Final | | | | | |
| Athlete | Event | Hoop | Rope | Clubs | Ribbon | Total | Rank |
|---|---|---|---|---|---|---|---|
| Valeska Gonzalez | Individual | 19.950 | 20.350 | 20.575 | 19.325 | 80.200 | 15° |

== Handball ==
Chile has qualified a men's team and a women's team

Men

Team

- Guillermo Araya
- Felipe Barrientos
- Rodolfo Cornejo
- Rodrigo Diaz
- Emil Feuchtmann
- Erwin Feuchtmann
- Harald Feuchtmann
- Nicolas Jofre
- Patricio Martinez
- Felipe Maurin
- René Oliva
- Marco Oneto
- Esteban Salinas
- Rodrigo Salinas
- Alfredo Valenzuela

Standings

| Pos | Team | Pld | W | D | L | GF | GA | GD | Pts | Qualification |
|---|---|---|---|---|---|---|---|---|---|---|
| 1 | Brazil | 3 | 3 | 0 | 0 | 119 | 54 | +65 | 6 | Semifinals |
| 2 | Chile | 3 | 2 | 0 | 1 | 101 | 89 | +12 | 4 | Semifinals |
| 3 | Canada | 3 | 1 | 0 | 2 | 70 | 113 | −43 | 2 | 5th–8th place semifinals |
| 4 | Venezuela | 3 | 0 | 0 | 3 | 68 | 102 | −34 | 0 | 5th–8th place semifinals |

Source: Guadalajara 2011
Rules for classification: 1) points; 2) head-to-head points; 3) head-to-head goal difference; 4) head-to-head goals scored; 5) goal difference; 6) goals scored; 7) draw.

Results

| October 16; 15:00 | Chile | 37 – 28 | Venezuela | San Rafael Gymnasium; Referees: Perez, Guzman (PUR) |
| October 16; 15:00 | Feuchtmann 8 | Report | Peñaloza 6 | San Rafael Gymnasium; Referees: Perez, Guzman (PUR) |

| October 18; 13:00 | Canada | 25 – 42 | Chile | San Rafael Gymnasium; Referees: Prieto, Gonzalez (URU) |
| October 18; 13:00 | two players, 5 | Report | two players, 8 | San Rafael Gymnasium; Referees: Prieto, Gonzalez (URU) |

| October 20; 13:00 | Brazil | 36 – 22 | Chile | San Rafael Gymnasium; Referees: Prieto, Gonzalez (URU) |
| October 20; 13:00 | Ribeiro, 10 | Report | Two players, 5 | San Rafael Gymnasium; Referees: Prieto, Gonzalez (URU) |

=== Semifinals ===
| October 22; 17:30 | Chile | 25 – 26 | Argentina | San Rafael Gymnasium; Referees: Pinto, Meneses (BRA) |
| October 22; 17:30 | Salinas, 7 | Report | Fernández, 8 | San Rafael Gymnasium; Referees: Pinto, Meneses (BRA) |

=== Bronze medal match ===
| October 24; 17:30 | Dominican Republic | 24 – 27 | Chile | San Rafael Gymnasium; Referees: Marina, Minore (ARG) |
| October 24; 17:30 | Mirabal, 8 | Report | two players, 5 | San Rafael Gymnasium; Referees: Marina, Minore (ARG) |

2011 Pan American Games Bronze medal

Chile

Women

Team

- Gisele Angel
- Paula Cajas
- Daniela Canessa
- Daniela Ceza
- Andrea Cisterna
- Inga Feuchtmann
- Pamela Flores
- Valeria Flores
- Maria Letelier
- Daniela Mino
- Maria Musalem
- Carla Sciaraffia
- Alicia Torres
- Elba Torres
- Pamela Vera

Standings

| Pos | Team | Pld | W | D | L | GF | GA | GD | Pts | Qualification |
|---|---|---|---|---|---|---|---|---|---|---|
| 1 | Argentina | 3 | 3 | 0 | 0 | 87 | 60 | +27 | 6 | Semifinals |
| 2 | Mexico (H) | 3 | 2 | 0 | 1 | 55 | 63 | −8 | 4 | Semifinals |
| 3 | Puerto Rico | 3 | 1 | 0 | 2 | 76 | 84 | −8 | 2 | 5th–8th place semifinals |
| 4 | Chile | 3 | 0 | 0 | 3 | 63 | 74 | −11 | 0 | 5th–8th place semifinals |

Source: Guadalajara 2011
Rules for classification: 1) points; 2) head-to-head points; 3) head-to-head goal difference; 4) head-to-head goals scored; 5) goal difference; 6) goals scored; 7) draw.
(H) Hosts

Results

| October 15; 20:00 | Mexico | 18–17 | Chile | San Rafael Gymnasium; Referees: Meneses, Pinto (BRA) |
| October 15; 20:00 | Saavedra 7 | Report | 2 players 4 | San Rafael Gymnasium; Referees: Meneses, Pinto (BRA) |

| October 17; 15:00 | Chile | 20–28 | Argentina | San Rafael Gymnasium; Referees: De Souza, Paz (BRA) |
| October 17; 15:00 | Feuchtmann, 7 | Report | 2 players, 6 | San Rafael Gymnasium; Referees: De Souza, Paz (BRA) |

| October 19; 15:00 | Puerto Rico | 28–26 | Chile | San Rafael Gymnasium; Referees: Meneses, Pinto (BRA) |
| October 19; 15:00 | 2 players, 7 | Report | 2 players, 5 | San Rafael Gymnasium; Referees: Meneses, Pinto (BRA) |

=== Fifth-eighth place matches ===
| October 21; 17:30 | Uruguay | 30–32 | Chile | San Rafael Gymnasium; Referees: De Souza, Paz (BRA) |
| October 21; 17:30 | Castro, 10 | Report | Feuchtmann, 8 | San Rafael Gymnasium; Referees: De Souza, Paz (BRA) |

=== Fifth place match ===
| October 23; 12:30 | Puerto Rico | 27–31 | Chile | San Rafael Gymnasium; Referees: Duran, Guzman (MEX) |
| October 23; 12:30 | Garcia, 7 | Report | Two players, 6 | San Rafael Gymnasium; Referees: Duran, Guzman (MEX) |

2011 Pan American Games 5

Chile

== Judo ==
Chile has qualified four athletes in the 66 kg, 73 kg, 81 kg, and 90 kg men's categories and two athletes in the 48 kg and 57 kg women's categories.

Men

| Athlete | Event | Round of 16 | Quarterfinals | Semifinals | Final |
| Athlete | Event | Opposition Result | Opposition Result | Opposition Result | Opposition Result |
|---|---|---|---|---|---|
| Alejandro Zuñiga | −66 kg | Keneth Hashimoto (USA); L 000 – 100 | Did not advance (to repechage round) | | |
| Fernando Salazar | −73 kg | | Bruno Silva (BRA); L 000 – 001 S1 | Did not advance (to repechage round) | |
| Luis Retamales | −81 kg | Leandro Guilheiro (BRA); L 000 S3 – 110 | Did not advance (to repechage round) | | |
| Rafael F. Romo | −90 kg | Oscar Ladino (COL); W 100 – 000 | Asley González (CUB); L 000 S2 – 101 | Did not advance (to repechage round) | |

Repechage Rounds

| Athlete | Event | Repechage Quarterfinals | Repechage Semifinals | Bronze Final |
| Athlete | Event | Opposition Result | Opposition Result | Opposition Result |
|---|---|---|---|---|
| Alejandro Zuñiga | −66 kg | Flavio Verdugo (ECU); L 000 S2 – 001 | Did not advance | |
| Fernando Salazar | −73 kg | | Michael Eldred (USA); L 000 S2 – 001 | Did not advance |
| Luis Retamales | −81 kg | German Velazco (PER); L 000 – 100 | Did not advance | |
| Rafael F. Romo | −90 kg | | Hector Campos (ARG); W 100 – 000 S1 | Isao Cardenas (MEX); L 000 S1- 101 |

Women

| Athlete | Event | Round of 16 | Quarterfinals | Semifinals | Final |
| Athlete | Event | Opposition Result | Opposition Result | Opposition Result | Opposition Result |
|---|---|---|---|---|---|
| Galleguillos A. | −48 kg | | Edna Carrillo (MEX); L 000 S3 – 012 S1 | Did not advance (to repechage round) | |
| Belen Achurra | −57 kg | | Yurisleidy Lupetey (CUB); L 000 – 100 | Did not advance (to repechage round) | |

Repechage Rounds

| Athlete | Event | First Repechage Round | Repechage Quarterfinals | Repechage Semifinals | Bronze Final |
| Athlete | Event | Opposition Result | Opposition Result | Opposition Result | Opposition Result |
|---|---|---|---|---|---|
| Galleguillos A. | −48 kg | | Luz Alvarez (COL); L 000 – 100 | Did not advance | |
| Belen Achurra | −57 kg | | Hana Carmichael (USA); L 000 – 120 | Did not advance | |

== Karate ==
Chile has qualified two athletes in the 60 kg and 75 kg men's categories and four athletes in the 50 kg, 55 kg, 68 kg, and 68+kg women's categories.

| Athlete | Event | Round robin (Pool A/B) | | | Semifinals | Final |
| Athlete | Event | Match 1 | Match 2 | Match 3 | Semifinals | Final |
| Athlete | Event | Opposition Result | Opposition Result | Opposition Result | Opposition Result | Opposition Result |
|---|---|---|---|---|---|---|
| Miguel Soffia | Men's -60 kg | Andrés Rendón (COL); L PTS 0:5 | Adam Brozzer (USA); W PTS 7:3 | David Perez G. (ESA); KIK 0:0 | Norberto Sosa (DOM); L PTS 1:2 (bronze) | Did not advance |
| David Dubo | Men's -75 kg | Dionisio Gustavo (DOM); L PTS 1:2 | Israel Aco (PER); W PTS 2:0 | Lester Zamora (CUB); W PTS 1:0 | Antonio Gutierrez (MEX); L PTS 2:3 (bronze) | Did not advance |
| Gabriela Bruna | Women's -50 kg | Tyler Wolfe (USA); HKW 0:0 | Paula Ruiz (COL); W PTS 2:0 | Jessica Candido (BRA); W PTS 3:2 | Cheili Gonzalez (GUA); W PTS 1:0 | Ana Villanueva (DOM); L PTS 0:1 (silver) |
| Jessy Reyes | Women's -55 kg | Lorena Mendoza (MEX); HKW 0:0 | Shannon Nishi (USA); HKW 0:0 | Ester Micheo (BRA); W PTS 4:1 | Karina Diaz (DOM); L PTS 1:2 (bronze) | Did not advance |
| Elizabeth Retamal | Women's -68 kg | Ashley Binns Miranda (CRC); L PTS 0:1 | Yoandra Moreno (CUB); L PTS 0:2 | Lucelia Ribeiro (BRA); L PTS 0:1 | Did not advance | |
| Claudia Vera | Women's +68 kg | Olivia Grant (CAN); W PTS 3:0 | Jeanis Colzani (BRA); W PTS 1:0 | Yelsi Piña (VEN); L PTS 0:2 | Maria Castellanos (GUA); L PTS 2:2 (bronze) | Did not advance |

== Modern pentathlon ==
Chile has qualified two male and one woman pentathlete.

Men

| Athlete | Fencing (épée one touch) | | | Swimming (200m freestyle) | | | Riding (show jumping) | | | Combined | | | Total points | Final rank |
| Athlete | Results | Rank | MP points | Time | Rank | MP points | Penalties | Rank | MP points | Time | Rank | MP points | Total points | Final rank |
|---|---|---|---|---|---|---|---|---|---|---|---|---|---|---|
| Esteban Bustos | 14 V – 10D | 892 | 9 | 2:13.00 | 1204 | 13 | 87.79 | 1192 | 8 | 10:57.23 | 2368 | 3 | 5656 | 3rd place, bronze medalist(s) |
| Cristian Bustos | 9 V – 15 D | 712 | 19 | 2:17.68 | 1148 | 17 | 2:17.68 | 1048 | 20 | 12:33.45 | 1988 | 16 | 4896 | 16° |

Women

| Athlete | Fencing (épée one touch) | | | Swimming (200m freestyle) | | | Riding (show jumping) | | | Combined | | | Total points | Final rank |
| Athlete | Results | Rank | MP points | Time | Rank | MP points | Penalties | Rank | MP points | Time | Rank | MP points | Total points | Final rank |
|---|---|---|---|---|---|---|---|---|---|---|---|---|---|---|
| Javiera Rosas | 16 V – 16 D | 832 | 8 | 2:28.39 | 1020 | 12 | 172.21 | 692 | 16 | 15:53.06 | 1188 | 15 | 3732 | 15° |

== Racquetball ==
=== Women ===
| Athlete | Event | Preliminary round (2 or 3) | Round of 16 | Quarterfinals | Semifinals | Final | |
| Athlete | Event | Opposition Score | Opposition Score | Opposition Score | Opposition Score | Opposition Score | Rank |
|---|---|---|---|---|---|---|---|
| Angela Grisar | Singles | Naria Cordova (ECU); L 15 – 14, 7 – 8 RET; Rhonda Rajsic (USA); L WO 0 – 15, 0 – 15 | Cheryl Gudinas (USA); L 15 – 13, 4 – 15, 1 – 11 | Did not advance | | | |
| Carla Muñoz | Singles | Paola Longoria (MEX); L 0 – 15, 4 – 15; Maria Muñoz (ECU); L 2 – 15, 4 – 15 | Jenny Daza (BOL); L 1 – 15, 1 – 15 | Did not advance | | | |
| Angela Grisar; Carla Muñoz | Doubles | Paola Longoria (Mexico) Samantha Salas (MEX); L 1 – 15, 4 – 15; Claudine Garcia (Dominican Republic) Yira Portes (DOM); W 3 – 15, 15 – 8, 11 – 5 | | Veronique Guillemette (Argentina) Dafne Macrino (ARG); W 15 – 12, 15 – 6 | Paola Longoria (Mexico) Samantha Salas (MEX); L 5 – 15, 5 – 15 (bronze) | Did not advance | |
| Angela Grisar; Carla Muñoz | Team | | Bolivia; L 0 – 2, 0 – 2 | Did not advance | | | |

== Roller skating ==
Chile has qualified two male and two female athletes in the roller skating competitions.

=== Men ===
| Athlete | Event | Qualification | | Final | |
| Athlete | Event | Result | Rank | Result | Rank |
|---|---|---|---|---|---|
| Emanuelle Silva | 300 m time trial | | | 25.102 | 2nd place, silver medalist(s) |
| Jorge Reyes | 1,000 m | 1:27.897 | 1 Q | 1:26.239 | 3rd place, bronze medalist(s) |
| Jorge Reyes | 10,000 m | | | 10 | 3rd place, bronze medalist(s) |

Artistic

| Athlete | Event | Short program | | Long program | |
| Athlete | Event | Result | Rank | Result | Rank |
|---|---|---|---|---|---|
| Jose Luis Diaz | Free skating | 112.90 | 5 | 118.90 | 5° |

=== Women ===
| Athlete | Event | Qualification | | Final | |
| Athlete | Event | Result | Rank | Result | Rank |
|---|---|---|---|---|---|
| Maria Moya | 300 m time trial | | | 26.807 | 2nd place, silver medalist(s) |
| Catherine Peñan | 1,000 m | 1:35.572 | 3 Q | 1:36.221 | 5° |
| Catherine Peñan | 10,000 m | | | 10 | 3rd place, bronze medalist(s) |

Artistic

| Athlete | Event | Short program | | Long program | |
| Athlete | Event | Result | Rank | Result | Rank |
|---|---|---|---|---|---|
| Marisol Villarroel | Free skating | 123.30 | 2 | 123.70 | 2nd place, silver medalist(s) |

== Rowing ==
Men

| Athlete(s) | Event | Heat | | Repechage | | Final | |
| Athlete(s) | Event | Time | Rank | Time | Rank | Time | Rank |
|---|---|---|---|---|---|---|---|
| Oscar Mauricio Vazquez | Single sculls (M1×) | 7:17.35 | 2 QF | | | 7:09.33 | 4° |
| Lorenzo Candia; Miguel Cerda | Coxless pair (M2×) | 6:54.05 | 3 R | 6:56.11 | 1 QF | 6:59.88 | 6° |
| Marco Azurmendi; Cristian Yantani | Lightweight double sculls (LM2×) | 7:17.65 | 6 R | 7:06.29 | 4 QB | 6:54.37 | 10° |
| Félipe Leal; Fernando Miralles; Rodrigo Muñoz; Fabian Oyarzun | lightweight coxless four (M4×) | 6:13.97 | 1 QF | | | 6:06.36 | 3rd place, bronze medalist(s) |

== Rugby sevens ==
Chile has qualified a team to participate in rugby sevens. It will consist of 12 athletes.

Team

- Jose Barturen
- Oliver Bassa
- Felipe Brangier
- Aldo Cornejo
- German Herrera
- Francisco Hurtado
- Tomas Ianiszeswcki
- Francisco Metuaze
- Juan Pablo Metuaze
- Benjamin Omegna
- Alfonso Rioja
- Ignacio Silva

| Team | Pld | W | D | L | PF | PA | PD | Pts |
|---|---|---|---|---|---|---|---|---|
| Canada | 3 | 3 | 0 | 0 | 109 | 28 | +81 | 12 |
| United States | 3 | 1 | 1 | 1 | 54 | 55 | −1 | 7 |
| Brazil | 3 | 1 | 1 | 1 | 33 | 71 | −38 | 7 |
| Chile | 3 | 0 | 0 | 3 | 21 | 63 | −42 | 3 |

October 29, 2011
11:00

| United States | 14 – 7 | Chile |
| Tries: Unufe, Mauer; Con: Niua (2/2) | Report | Tries: Ianiszeswcki; Con: Herrera (1/1) |

Tlaquepaque Stadium, Guadalajara

October 29, 2011
13:35

| Canada | 35 – 7 | Chile |
| | Report |

Tlaquepaque Stadium, Guadalajara

October 29, 2011
15:40

| Brazil | 14 – 7 | Chile |
| | Report |

Tlaquepaque Stadium, Guadalajara

=== Quarterfinals ===
October 30, 2011
9:00

| Argentina | 21 – 5 | Chile |
| | Report |

Tlaquepaque Stadium, Guadalajara

=== Fifth to Eighth place ===
October 30, 2011
11:10

| Chile | 19 – 14 | Brazil |
| | Report |

Tlaquepaque Stadium, Guadalajara

=== Fifth place match ===
October 30, 2011
13:55

| Chile | 22 – 0 | Mexico |
| | Report |

Tlaquepaque Stadium, Guadalajara

== Sailing ==
Chile has qualified five boats and eleven athletes in five sailing competitions.

=== Men ===
| Athlete | Event | Race | | | | | | | | | | | Net points | Final rank |
| Athlete | Event | 1 | 2 | 3 | 4 | 5 | 6 | 7 | 8 | 9 | 10 | M | Net points | Final rank |
|---|---|---|---|---|---|---|---|---|---|---|---|---|---|---|
| Matias Del Solar | Single-handed Dinghy (Laser) | 9 | 9 | 5 | 1 | 2 | 1 | (10) | 6 | 1 | 3 | 2 | 39.0 | 2nd place, silver medalist(s) |

=== Women ===
| Athlete | Event | Race | | | | | | | | | | | Net points | Final rank |
| Athlete | Event | 1 | 2 | 3 | 4 | 5 | 6 | 7 | 8 | 9 | 10 | M | Net points | Final rank |
|---|---|---|---|---|---|---|---|---|---|---|---|---|---|---|
| Adriana Kostiw | Single-handed Dinghy (Laser Radial) | 7 | 11 | 6 | 13 | (14); DSQ | 10 | 7 | 11 | 14; DSQ | 10 | / | 89.0 | 12° |

=== Open ===
| Athlete | Event | Race | | | | | | | | | | | Net points | Final rank |
| Athlete | Event | 1 | 2 | 3 | 4 | 5 | 6 | 7 | 8 | 9 | 10 | M | Net points | Final rank |
|---|---|---|---|---|---|---|---|---|---|---|---|---|---|---|
| Matías Seguel; Cristobal Grez; Marc Jux; Juan Lira | Keelboat (J/24) | 6 | 2 | 5 | (8); DSQ | 5 | 1 | 8 DSQ | 2 | 4 | 1 | 2 | 36.0 | 3rd place, bronze medalist(s) |
| Alberto González González; Diego González; Cristian Herman | Multi-crewed Dinghy (Lightning) | 4 | 2 | 4 | 1 | (6) | 1 | 2 | 1 | 3 | 2 | 6 | 26.0 | 1st place, gold medalist(s) |
| Pedro Robles; Jose Ignacio Lopez | Double-handed Dinghy (Snipe) | 8 | 6 | 3 | 5 | 2 | 3 | 3 | (9) | 4 | 7 | 10 | 51.0 | 5° |
| Andres Ducasse | Single-handed Dinghy (Sunfish) | (12) | 11 | 3 | 8 | 7 | 10 | 11 | 11 | 6 | 11 | / | 78.0 | 11° |

== Shooting ==
Men

| Event | Athlete | Qualification | | Final | |
| Event | Athlete | Score | Rank | Score | Rank |
|---|---|---|---|---|---|
| 10 m air pistol | Manuel Sánchez | 568-13x | 12 | Did not advance | |
| 10 m air pistol | Hinrich Huber | 548-12x | 29 | Did not advance | |
| 10 m air rifle | Gonzalo Moncada | 586-38x | 5 Q | 688.9 | 3rd place, bronze medalist(s) |
| 10 m air rifle | Mauricio Huerta | 578-29x | 19 | Did not advance | |
| 50 m pistol | Manuel Sánchez | 542- 5x | 9 | Did not advance | |
| 50 m rifle 3 positions | Elias San Martin | 1138- 41x | 10 | Did not advance | |
| 50 m rifle 3 positions | Marcos Huerta | 1127- 36x | 13 | Did not advance | |
| 50 m rifle prone | Elias San Martin | 585-29x | 9 | Did not advance | |
| 50 m rifle prone | Gonzalo Moncada | 587-27x | 7 Q | 678.0 | 8° |
| Trap | Gianluca Dapelo | 113 | 18 | Did not advance | |
| Trap | Claudio Vergara | 106 | 26 | Did not advance | |
| Skeet | Jorge Atalah | 117 | 13 | Did not advance | |
| Skeet | Raul Franco | 111 | 23 | Did not advance | |

Women

| Event | Athlete | Qualification | | Final | |
| Event | Athlete | Score | Rank | Score | Rank |
|---|---|---|---|---|---|
| 10 m air pistol | Maria Lagos | 358- 5x | 22 | Did not advance | |
| 10 m air rifle | Gladys Aguilera | 383-18x | 20 | Did not advance | |
| 10 m air rifle | Gabriela Lobos | 381-17x | 23 | Did not advance | |
| 25 m pistol | Maria Lagos | 492- 3x | 25 | Did not advance | |
| 50 m rifle 3 positions | Karina Vera | 560-15x | 16 | Did not advance | |
| 50 m rifle 3 positions | Gabriela Lobos | 563-20x | 11 | Did not advance | |
| Trap | Nicole Morgado | 49 | 11 | Did not advance | |
| Trap | Pamela Salman | 60 | 8 | Did not advance | |
| Skeet | Francisca Crovetto | 67 | 2 Q | 89 | 2nd place, silver medalist(s) |

== Squash ==
Chile has qualified three male and three female athletes in the individual and team competitions.

Men

| Athlete | Event | Round of 32 | Round of 16 | Quarterfinals | Semifinals | Final |
| Athlete | Event | Opposition Score | Opposition Score | Opposition Score | Opposition Score | Opposition Score |
|---|---|---|---|---|---|---|
| Maximiliano Camiruaga | Singles | Vinicius Rodriguez (BRA); L 7-11, 11-4, 6-11, 10-12 | Did not advance | | | |
| Jaime Pinto | Singles | Mauricio Sedano (GUA); W 11-7, 11-7, 11-8 | Rafael Fernandes (BRA); L 9-11, 11-9, 2-11, 11-5, 6-12 | Did not advance | | |
| Jaime Pinto; Maximiliano Camiruaga | Doubles | Vinicius De Lima (BRA); Rafael Fernandes (BRA); L WO 0-11, 0-11 | Did not advance | | | |

| Athletes | Event | Preliminaries Group stage | | | Quarterfinal | Semifinal | Final |
| Athletes | Event | Opposition Result | Opposition Result | Opposition Result | Opposition Result | Opposition Result | Opposition Result |
|---|---|---|---|---|---|---|---|
| Jaime Pinto; Maximiliano Camiruaga; Rafael Allendes | Team | Canada; L 0-3, 0-3, 0-3 | Colombia; L 0-3, 1-3, 1-3 | Guatemala; W 1-3, 3-0, 3-0 | Did not advance | | |

Women

| Athlete | Event | First round | Round of 16 | Quarterfinals | Semifinals | Final |
| Athlete | Event | Opposition Score | Opposition Score | Opposition Score | Opposition Score | Opposition Score |
|---|---|---|---|---|---|---|
| Sandra Pinto | Singles | | Samantha Terán (MEX); L 0-11, 1-11, 2-11 | Did not advance | | |
| Ana Maria Pinto | Singles | | Silvia Angulo (COL); L 4-11, 7-11, 10-11 | Did not advance | | |
| Sandra Pinto; Ana Maria Pinto | Doubles | | | Catalina Peláez (COL); Silvia Angulo (COL); L 4-11, 3-11 | Did not advance | |

| Athletes | Event | Preliminaries Group stage | | | Quarterfinal | Semifinal | Final |
| Athletes | Event | Opposition Result | Opposition Result | Opposition Result | Opposition Result | Opposition Result | Opposition Result |
|---|---|---|---|---|---|---|---|
| Sandra Pinto; Ana Maria Pinto; Ornella Gonzalez | Team | Canada; L 0-3, 0-3, 0-3 | Colombia; L 0-3, 1-3, 0-3 | Guatemala; L 2-3, 3-0, 0-3 | Did not advance | | |

== Swimming ==
Men

| Event | Athletes | Heats | | Final | |
| Event | Athletes | Time | Position | Time | Position |
|---|---|---|---|---|---|
| 50 m Freestyle | Oliver Elliot | 23.74 | 14 | Did not advance | |
| 100 m Breaststroke | Felipe França | 1:05.84 | 19 | Did not advance | |

Women

| Athlete(s) | Event | Heat | | Final | |
| Athlete(s) | Event | Result | Rank | Result | Rank |
|---|---|---|---|---|---|
| 200m Freestyle | Daniela Reyes | 2:13.73 | 13 QB | 2:15.07 | 13° |
| 400m Freestyle | Kristel Kobrich | 4:16.23 | 2 Q | 4:13.31 | 3rd place, bronze medalist(s) |
| 800m Freestyle | Kristel Kobrich | 8:42.16 | 1 Q | 8:34.71 | 1st place, gold medalist(s) |
| 100m Breaststroke | Isabel Riquelme | 1:13.76 | 15 QB | 1:13.99 | 14° |
| 200m Individual Medley | Daniela Reyes | 2:33.37 | 20 | Did not advance | |
| 400m Individual Medley | Daniela Reyes | 5:20.05 | 17 | Did not advance | |

== Table tennis ==
Chile has qualified three male and three female athletes in the individual and team competitions.

Men

| Athlete | Event | Round robin | | | 1st round | Eighthfinals | Quarterfinals | Semifinals | Final |
| Athlete | Event | Match 1 | Match 2 | Match 3 | 1st round | Eighthfinals | Quarterfinals | Semifinals | Final |
| Athlete | Event | Opposition Result | Opposition Result | Opposition Result | Opposition Result | Opposition Result | Opposition Result | Opposition Result | Opposition Result |
|---|---|---|---|---|---|---|---|---|---|
| Felipe Olivares | Singles | Thiago Monteiro (BRA); L 2 – 4 | Sul Bonilla (ESA); W 4 – 0 | Jonathan Pino (VEN); W 4 – 3 | Jorge Campos (CUB); L 2 – 4 | Did not advance | | | |
| Alejandro Rodríguez | Singles | Liu Song (ARG); L 1 – 4 | Hector Gatica (GUA); L 2 – 4 | Marco Navas (VEN); L 2 – 4 | Did not advance | | | | |
| Andres Carlier | Singles | Gaston Alto (ARG); L 2 – 4 | Pierre-Luc Thériault (CAN); L 0 – 4 | Jose Miguel Ramirez (GUA); L 0 – 4 | Did not advance | | | | |
| Felipe Olivares; Alejandro Rodríguez; Andres Carlier | Team | Argentina; L 0 – 3, 0 – 3, 2 – 3 | United States; L 1 – 3, 1 – 3, 2 – 3 | | | | Did not advance | | |

Women

| Athlete | Event | Round robin | | | 1st round | Eighthfinals | Quarterfinals | Semifinals | Final |
| Athlete | Event | Match 1 | Match 2 | Match 3 | 1st round | Eighthfinals | Quarterfinals | Semifinals | Final |
| Athlete | Event | Opposition Result | Opposition Result | Opposition Result | Opposition Result | Opposition Result | Opposition Result | Opposition Result | Opposition Result |
|---|---|---|---|---|---|---|---|---|---|
| Judith Morales | Singles | Johana Araque (COL); L 2 – 4 | Angela Mori (PER); L 3 – 4 | Fabiola Ramos (VEN); L 1 – 4 | Did not advance | | | | |
| Paulina Vega | Singles | Andrea Estrada (GUA); W 4 – 0 | Luisana Perez (VEN); W 4 – 1 | Jerica Marrero (PUR); W 4 – 0 | | Paula Medina (COL); W 4 – 0 | Xue Wu (DOM); L 0 – 4 | Did not advance | |
| Berta Rodríguez | Singles | Sandra Orellana (ESA); W 4 – 0 | Paula Medina (COL); L 0 – 4 | Eva Brito (DOM); W 4 – 1 | Leisy Jimenez (CUB); L 2 – 4 | Did not advance | | | |
| Judith Morales; Paulina Vega; Berta Rodríguez | Team | Canada; L 1 – 3, 2 – 3, 3 – 0, 0 – 3 | Guatemala; W 3 – 0, 3 – 2, 3 – 1 | | | | United States; L 0 – 3, 1 – 3, 3 – 1, 0 – 3 | Did not advance | |

== Taekwondo ==
Chile has qualified two athletes in the 68 kg and 80 kg men's categories and two athletes in the 57 kg and 67 kg women's categories.

Men

| Athlete | Event | Round of 16 | Quarterfinals | Semifinals | Final |
| Athlete | Event | Opposition Result | Opposition Result | Opposition Result | Opposition Result |
|---|---|---|---|---|---|
| Mario Guerra | Featherweight (-68kg) | Sergio Dario Garcia (ECU); W 11 – 9 | Siddhatha Baht (CAN); W 7 – 6 | Angel Mora (CUB); L 6 – 12 (bronze) | Did not advance |
| Carlos Liebig | Welterweight (-80kg) | Wilfin Heredia Prenza (DOM); W 12 – 10 | Carlos Vazquez (VEN); L 3 – 14 | Did not advance | |

Women

| Athlete | Event | Round of 16 | Quarterfinals | Semifinals | Final |
| Athlete | Event | Opposition Result | Opposition Result | Opposition Result | Opposition Result |
|---|---|---|---|---|---|
| Yeny Contreras | Featherweight (-57kg) | Elizabeth Alvarado (PER); W 10 – 4 | Euda Carias (GUA); W 5 – 1 | Doris Patiño (COL); L 5 – 6 (bronze) | Did not advance |
| Catalina Fierro | Welterweight (-67kg) | Katherine Rodriguez Peguero (DOM); L 1 – 2 | Did not advance | | |

== Tennis ==
=== Men ===
| Athlete | Event | 1st Round | Round of 32 | Round of 16 | Quarterfinals | Semifinals | Final |
| Athlete | Event | Opposition Score | Opposition Score | Opposition Score | Opposition Score | Opposition Score | Opposition Score |
|---|---|---|---|---|---|---|---|
| Jorge Aguilar | Singles | | Sebastien Vidal (GUA); W 6 – 1, 6 – 4 | Iván Miranda (PER); W 6 – 3, 4 – 6, 6 – 3 | Robert Farah Maksoud (COL); L 0 – 6, 2 – 6 | Did not advance | |
| Nicolás Massú | Singles | Federico Sansonetti (URU); W 6 – 0, 6 – 1 | Nicholas Monroe (USA); W 6 – 4, 6 – 4 | Ricardo Mello (BRA); L 6 – 1, 2 – 6, 3 – 6 | Did not advance | | |
| Guillermo Rivera | Singles | | Roberto Quiroz (ECU); W 7 – 5, 6 – 4 | Juan Cabal (COL); L 6 – 4, 4 – 6, 2 – 6 | Did not advance | | |
| Jorge Aguilar; Nicolás Massú | Doubles | | | Mauricio Doria (BOL); Federico Zeballos (BOL); W 6 – 1, 7 – 5 | Darian King (BAR); Haydn Lewis (BAR); L 6 – 4, 6(6) – 7, [8-10] | Did not advance | |

=== Women ===
| Athlete | Event | Round of 32 | Round of 16 | Quarterfinals | Semifinals | Final |
| Athlete | Event | Opposition Score | Opposition Score | Opposition Score | Opposition Score | Opposition Score |
|---|---|---|---|---|---|---|
| Andrea Koch Benvenuto | Singles | Patricia Kú Flores (PER); W 6–1, 6–0 | Christina McHale (USA); L 4–6, 2–6 | Did not advance | | |
| Daniela Seguel | Singles | Ximena Siles-Luna (PER); W 6–2, 4–6, 7–6^{(7–1)} | Mariana Duque (COL); L 5–7, 0–6 | Did not advance | | |
| Camila Silva | Singles | Gabriela Dabrowski (CAN); L 4–6, 0–6 | Did not advance | | | |
| Daniela Seguel; Camila Silva | Doubles | | Misleydis Diaz (CUB); Yamile Fors (CUB); W 7–6, 3–6, [11–9] | Teliana Pereira (BRA); Vivian Segnini (BRA); L 1–6, 4–6 | Did not advance | |

=== Mixed doubles ===
| Athlete | Event | Round of 16 | Quarterfinals | Semifinals | Final |
| Athlete | Event | Opposition Score | Opposition Score | Opposition Score | Opposition Score |
|---|---|---|---|---|---|
| Andrea Koch Benvenuto; Guillermo Rivera | Doubles | | Karen Castiblanco (COL); Alejandro González (COL); W 6 – 4, 4 – 6, [10-7] | Adriana Pérez (VEN); Román Recarte (VEN); W 6 – 4, 3 – 6, [10-8] | Ana Paula de la Peña (MEX); Santiago González (MEX); L 5 – 7, 4 – 6 (silver) |

== Triathlon ==
=== Men ===
| Athlete | Event | Swim (1.5 km) | Trans 1 | Bike (40 km) | Trans 2 | Run (10 km) | Total | Rank |
|---|---|---|---|---|---|---|---|---|
| Felipe Van de Wyngard | Individual | 18:28; 17 | 0:24; 9 | 57:13; 11 | 0:14; 6 | 33:53; 8 | 1:50:14 | 8° |
| Luis Barraza | Individual | 19:33; 35 | 0:24; 11 | 56:41; 1 | 0:16; 19 | 40:40; 29 | 1:57:42 | 25° |
| Gaspar Riveros | Individual | 19:35; 36 | 0:25; 19 | 1:05:13; 33 | 0:16; 14 | 45:45; 33 | 2:11:16 | 33° |

=== Women ===
| Athlete | Event | Swim (1.5 km) | Trans 1 | Bike (40 km) | Trans 2 | Run (10 km) | Total | Rank |
|---|---|---|---|---|---|---|---|---|
| Barbara Riveros | Individual | 20:44; 2 | 0:26; 6 | 1:03:07; 10 | 0:16; 6 | 35:49; 1 | 2:00:23 | 2nd place, silver medalist(s) |
| Favia Diaz | Individual | 20:55; 22 | 0:26; 7 | 1:03:04; 4 | 0:20; 17 | 42:49; 15 | 2:07:33 | 15° |
| Valentina Carvallo | Individual | DSQ | | | | | | |

== Water skiing ==
Chile has qualified a full team in the water skiing competition.

=== Men ===
| Event | Athlete | Semifinal | | Final | |
| Event | Athlete | Points | Rank | Points | Rank |
|---|---|---|---|---|---|
| Tricks | Felipe Miranda | 8550 | 4 q | 9430 | 3rd place, bronze medalist(s) |
| Tricks | Rodrigo Miranda | 8480 | 5 q | 8750 | 5° |
| Slalom | Felipe Miranda | 39.00 | 1 q | 37.50 | 4° |
| Slalom | Rodrigo Miranda | 34.00 | 7 q | DNS | |
| Jump | Felipe Miranda | 55.20 | 6 q | 62.70 | 3rd place, bronze medalist(s) |
| Jump | Rodrigo Miranda | 61.40 | 3 q | 64.50 | 2nd place, silver medalist(s) |
| Overall | Felipe Miranda | | | 2800.8 | 2nd place, silver medalist(s) |
| Overall | Rodrigo Miranda | | | 2591.1 | 3rd place, bronze medalist(s) |

=== Women ===
| Athlete | Event | Semifinal | | Final | |
| Athlete | Event | Points | Rank | Points | Rank |
|---|---|---|---|---|---|
| Tricks | Tiare Miranda | 3940 | 8 | Did not advance | |
| Slalom | Tiare Miranda | 22.00 | 5 q | 22.00 | 5° |
| Jump | Tiare Miranda | 35.90 | 5 q | 38.40 | 5° |
| Overall | Tiare Miranda | | | 1502.7 | 5° |

== Weightlifting ==
| Athlete | Event | Snatch | | | Clean & jerk | | | Total | Rank |
| Athlete | Event | Attempt 1 | Attempt 2 | Attempt 3 | Attempt 1 | Attempt 2 | Attempt 3 | Total | Rank |
|---|---|---|---|---|---|---|---|---|---|
| Jorge García | Men's +105 kg | 145 | 150 | 153 | 180 | 185 | 190 | 343 | 6° |
| Leslie Armijo | Women's 63 kg | 86 | 90 | ~~95~~ | 107 | 111 | ~~116~~ | 201 | 4° |
| Angie Toledo | Women's 69 kg | ~~89~~ | ~~89~~ | ~~89~~ | Did not finish | | | | |
| Maria Valdes | Women's 75 kg | 95 | 100 | ~~103~~ | 126 | 129 | ~~131~~ | 229 | 2nd place, silver medalist(s) |

== Wrestling ==
=== Men ===
Freestyle

| Athlete | Event | Quarterfinals | Semifinals | Final |
| Athlete | Event | Opposition Result | Opposition Result | Opposition Result |
|---|---|---|---|---|
| Andre Quispe | 55 kg | Steven Takahashi (CAN); L 1 – 3 | Did not advance | |
