= Equestrian at the 2011 Pan American Games – Individual jumping =

Individual jumping at the 2011 Pan American Games
- Venues: Guadalajara Country Club
- Dates: October 26–29
- Competitors: 55 from 17 nations

Medalists
Gold medal	Christine McCrea on Romantovich Take One	United States
Silver medal	Beezie Madden on Coral Reef Via Volo	United States
Bronze medal	Bernardo Alves on Bridgit	Brazil

The individual jumping competition of the equestrian events at the 2011 Pan American Games took place between October 26–29 at the Guadalajara Country Club. The defending Pan American champion was Jill Henselwood of Canada.

== Schedule ==
All times are Central Standard Time (UTC-6).

Date	Time	Round
October 26, 2011	14:00	1st Qualifier
October 27, 2011	10:00	2nd Qualifier
October 27, 2011	14:00	3rd Qualifier
October 29, 2011	12:00	1st Round
October 29, 2011	14:30	2nd Round

== Results ==
=== Qualification round ===
Rank	Rider	Nation	Horse	1st Qualifier	2nd Qualifier	3rd Qualifier	Total	Notes
1	Beezie Madden	United States	Coral Reef Via Volo	0	0	0	0.00	Q
2	Christine McCrea	United States	Romantovich Take One	0.88	0	0	0.88	Q
3	McLain Ward	United States	Antares F	2.02	0	0	2.02	Q
4	Bernardo Alves	Brazil	Bridgit	2.09	0	0	2.09	Q
5	Alberto Michan	Mexico	Rosalia La Silla	1.28	0	1	2.28	Q
6	Rodrigo Pessoa	Brazil	HH Ashley	2.87	0	0	2.87	Q
7	Ian Millar	Canada	Star Power	3.79	0	0	3.79	Q
8	Kent Farrington	United States	Uceko	3.90	0	0	3.90	Q
9	Antonio Maurer	Mexico	Callao	0.98	4	0	4.98	Q
10	Tomas Couve	Chile	Arc en Ciel de Muze	4.87	0	1	5.87	Q
11	Jillian Terceira	Bermuda	Bernadien Van Westur	7.24	1	1	9.24	Q
12	Karina Johannpeter	Brazil	SRF Dragonfly de Joter	5.52	0	4	9.52	Q
13	Daniel Bluman	Colombia	Sancha LS	5.63	4	0	9.63	Q
14	Álvaro de Miranda Neto	Brazil	Ad Norson	2.62	0	8	10.62	Q
15	Eric Lamaze	Canada	Coriana V Klapscheut	3.03	4	4	11.03	Q
16	Jonathan Asselin	Canada	Showgirl	6.10	1	4	11.10	Q
17	Samuel Parot	Chile	Al Calypso	4.00	8	1	13.00	Q
18	Enrique Gonzalez	Mexico	Criptonite	5.17	4	4	13.17	Q
19	Rodrigo Carrasco	Chile	Or De La Charboniere	5.65	8	0	13.65	Q
20	Daniel Michan	Mexico	Ragna T	0.98	13	1	14.98	Q
21	Jose Larocca	Argentina	Royal Power	1.49	4	10	15.49	Q
22	Jill Henselwood	Canada	George	7.61	8	0	15.61	Q
23	Mark Watring	Puerto Rico	Greens Sleeps Vioco	7.74	4	4	15.74	Q
24	Matías Albarracín	Argentina	P'Compadre Bally Cullen Maid	3.86	13	0	16.86	Q
25	John Pérez	Colombia	Utopia	5.54	4	8	17.54	Q
26	Carlos Morstadt	Chile	Talento	6.01	8	4	18.01	Q
27	Pablo Andrade	Ecuador	Wokina	11.59	5	5	21.59	Q
28	Andrés Rodríguez	Venezuela	Beaufort Van Han Lind	5.83	0	16	21.83	Q
29	Héctor Florentino	Dominican Republic	Ultimo	13.36	5	4	22.36	Q
30	Martin Rodriguez	Uruguay	Cointreau Z	11.55	5	6	22.55	Q
31	Luis Barreiro	Ecuador	Silverado	5.98	9	8	22.98	
32	Maria Gastañeta	Peru	Gabriel	12.32	8	4	24.32	
33	Ricardo Dircie	Argentina	LLavaneras H.J. Aries	6.81	13	5	24.81	
34	Juan Pivaral	Guatemala	Valencia	8.53	13	4	25.53	
35	Angel Karolyi	Venezuela	James T Kirk	5.89	8	12	25.89	
36	Patrick Nisbett	Bermuda	Cantaro 32	6.31	5	15	26.31	
37	Alvaro Tejada	Guatemala	Voltaral Palo Blanco	12.49	12	4	28.49	
38	Rodrigo Díaz	Colombia	Celesta	5.02	20	4	29.02	
38	Noel Vanososte	Venezuela	Conrad D	5.02	8	16	29.02	
40	Gabriella Mizrachi	Panama	Unlimited	13.13	5	12	30.13	
41	Eduardo Castillo	Guatemala	Carland	7.37	17	6	30.37	
42	Martín Dopazo	Argentina	Chicago Z	4.26	20	8	32.26	
43	Marcelo Chirico	Uruguay	Omanie du Landais	7.29	9	16	32.29	
44	Jose Hernandez	El Salvador	Grupo Prom Jack	13.12	9	13	35.12	
45	Juan Rodríguez	Guatemala	VDL Empire	18.80	13	4	35.80	
46	Roberto Terán	Colombia	Denver	5.82	24	8	37.82	
47	Michelle Navarro Grau	Peru	Tibetano	11.13	20	8	39.13	
48	Carlos Cola	Uruguay	Don Quijote	15.44	17	9	41.44	
49	Rubén Rodríguez	Ecuador	True Love Santa Monica	8.81	13	20	41.81	
	Pablo Barrios	Venezuela	G&C Quick Star	3.22	EL	12	EL	
	Diego Vivero	Ecuador	Neypal Du Plant	10.82	EL	NS		
	Jenefer Teague	Peru	Tlapli L.S.	15.70	14			
	Alonso Valdez	Peru	United III	EL	NS			
	Israel López	Puerto Rico	Admiral Clover	13.59	NS			
	Federico Daners	Uruguay	Chicolas	EL	NS			

=== Final rounds ===
Rank	Rider	Nation	Horse	Qualification	Round A	Round B	Total
1st place, gold medalist(s)	Christine McCrea	United States	Romantovich Take One	0.88	0	0	0.88
2nd place, silver medalist(s)	Elizabeth Madden	United States	Coral Reef Via Volo	0.00	0	1	1.00
3rd place, bronze medalist(s)	Bernardo Alves	Brazil	Bridgit	2.09	0	0	2.09
4	McLain Ward	United States	Antares F	2.02	0	4	6.02
5	Alberto Michan	Mexico	Rosalia La Silla	2.28	4	1	7.28
6	Tomas Couve	Chile	Arc en Ciel de Muze	5.87	1	4	10.87
7	Daniel Bluman	Colombia	Sancha LS	9.63	0	4	13.63
8	Jillian Terceira	Bermuda	Bernadien Van Westur	9.24	5	2	16.24
9	Jonathan Asselin	Canada	Showgirl	11.10	1	5	17.10
10	Rodrigo Carrasco	Chile	Or De La Charboniere	13.65	1	4	18.65
11	Eric Lamaze	Canada	Coriana V Klapscheut	11.03	4	4	19.03
12	Antonio Maurer	Mexico	Callao	4.98	8	9	21.98
13	Samuel Parot	Chile	Al Calypso	13.00	5	8	26.00
14	Enrique Gonzalez	Mexico	Criptonite	13.17	9	5	27.17
15	Karina Johannpeter	Brazil	SRF Dragonfly de Joter	9.52	4	16	29.52
16	Matías Albarracín	Argentina	P'Compadre Bally Cullen Maid	16.86	9	5	30.86
17	John Pérez	Colombia	Utopia	17.54	1	13	31.54
18	Jose Larocca	Argentina	Royal Power	15.49	9	9	33.49
19	Martin Rodriguez	Uruguay	Cointreau Z	22.55	10	2	34.55
20	Héctor Florentino	Dominican Republic	Ultimo	22.36	9	8	39.36
21	Andrés Rodríguez	Venezuela	Beaufort Van Han Lind	21.83	5	17	43.83
22	Luis Barreiro	Ecuador	Silverado	22.98	10	18	50.98
	Pablo Andrade	Ecuador	Wokina	21.59	5	EL	
	Álvaro de Miranda Neto	Brazil	Ad Norson	10.62	8	NS	
	Ian Millar	Canada	Star Power	3.79	0	NS	
