= Equestrian at the 2011 Pan American Games – Team jumping =

Team jumping at the 2011 Pan American Games
- Venues: Guadalajara Country Club
- Dates: October 26–27
- Competitors: 48 from 12 nations

Medalists
Gold medal	Kent Farrington on Uceko; Beezie Madden on Coral Reef Via Volo; Christine McCrea on Romantovich Take One; McLain Ward on Antares F	United States
Silver medal	Álvaro de Miranda Neto on AD Norson; Bernardo Alves on Bridgit; Karina Johannpeter on SRF Dragonfly de Joter; Rodrigo Pessoa on HH Ashley	Brazil
Bronze medal	Antonio Maurer on Callao; Alberto Michan on Rosalía la Silla; Enrique González on Criptonite; Daniel Michan on Ragna T	Mexico

The team jumping competition of the equestrian events at the 2011 Pan American Games took place between October 26–27 at the Guadalajara Country Club. The defending Pan American champion was team of Brazil.

== Schedule ==
All times are Central Standard Time (UTC-6).

Date	Time	Round
October 26, 2011	14:00	1st Round
October 27, 2011	10:00	2nd Round
October 27, 2011	14:00	3rd Round

== Results ==
Rank	Nation	Horses	1st Round	2nd Round	3rd Round	Total
1st place, gold medalist(s)	United States; McLain Ward; Christine McCrea; Kent Farrington; Beezie Madden	Antares F Romantovich Take One; Uceko; Coral Reef Via Volo	2.90; 2.02; 0.88; ~~3.90~~; 0	0; ~~0~~; 0; 0; 0	0; ~~0~~; 0; 0; 0	2.90
2nd place, silver medalist(s)	Brazil; Rodrigo Pessoa; Karina Johannpeter; Bernardo Alves; Álvaro de Miranda Neto	HH Ashley; SRF Dragonfly de Joter; Bridgit; Ad Norson	7.58; 2.87; ~~5.52~~; 2.09; 2.62	0; ~~0~~; 0; 0; 0	4; 0; 4; 0; ~~8~~	11.58
3rd place, bronze medalist(s)	Mexico; Enrique Gonzalez; Daniel Michan; Antonio Maurer; Alberto Michan	Criptonite; Ragna T Callao; Rosalia La Silla	3.24; ~~5.17~~; 0.98; 0.98; 1.28	8; 4; ~~13~~; 4; 0	2; ~~4~~; 1; 0; 1	13.24
4	Canada; Eric Lamaze; Jonathan Asselin; Jill Henselwood; Ian Millar	Coriana V Klapscheut; Showgirl; George; Star Power	12.92; 3.03; 6.10; ~~7.61~~; 3.79	5; 4; 1; ~~8~~; 0	4; 4; ~~4~~; 0; 0	21.92
5	Chile; Samuel Parot; Rodrigo Carrasco; Carlos Morstadt; Tomas Couve	Al Calypso; Or De La Charboniere; Talento; Arc en Ciel de Muze	14.52; 4.00; 5.65; ~~6.01~~; 4.87	16; ~~8~~; 8; 8; 0	2; 1; 0; ~~4~~; 1	32.52
6	Argentina; Martín Dopazo; Ricardo Dircie; Matías Albarracín; Jose Larocca	Chicago Z LLavaneras H.J. Aries; P'Compadre Bally Cullen Maid; Royal Power	9.61; 4.26; ~~6.81~~; 3.86; 1.49	30; ~~20~~; 13; 13; 4	13; 8; 5; 0; ~~10~~	52.61
7	Colombia; Rodrigo Díaz; Daniel Bluman; John Pérez; Pablo Barrios	Celesta; Sancha LS; Utopia; Denver	16.19; 5.02; 5.63; 5.54; ~~5.82~~	28; 20; 4; 4; ~~24~~	12; 4; 0; 8; ~~8~~	56.19
8	Venezuela; Andrés Rodríguez; Angel Karolyi; Noel Vanososte; Roberto Terán	Beaufort Van Han Lind; James T Kirk; Conrad D G&C Quick Star	14.07; 5.83; ~~5.89~~; 5.02; 3.22	16; 0; 8; 8; 0	40; ~~16~~; 12; 16; 12	70.07
9	Guatemala; Alvaro Tejada; Eduardo Castillo; Juan Rodríguez; Juan Pivaral	Voltaral Palo Blanco; Carland; VDL Empire; Valencia	28.39; 12.49; 7.37; ~~18.80~~; 8.53	38; 12; ~~17~~; 13; 13	12; 4; ~~6~~; 4; 4	78.39
10	Ecuador; Diego Vivero; Rubén Rodríguez; Luis Barreiro; Pablo Andrade	Neypal Du Plant; True Love Santa Monica; Silverado; Wokina	25.61; 10.82; 8.81; 5.98; ~~11.59~~	27; ~~0~~; 13; 9; 5	33; ~~NS~~; 20; 8; 5	85.61
11	Uruguay; Carlos Cola; Martin Rodriguez; Marcelo Chirico; Federico Daners	Don Quijote; Cointreau Z Omanie du Landais; Chicolas	34.28; 15.44; 11.55; 7.29; ~~38.80~~	31; 17; 5; 9; ~~NS~~	31; 9; 6; 16; ~~NS~~	96.28
12	Peru; Jenefer Teague; Maria Gastañeta; Alonso Valdez; Michelle Navarro Grau	Tlapli L.S. Gabriel; United III; Tibetano	39.15; 15.70; 12.32; ~~38.80~~; 11.13	42; 14; 8; ~~NS~~; 29	—	—
