= Venues of the 2011 Pan American Games =

Sports venues in Guadalajara, Mexico

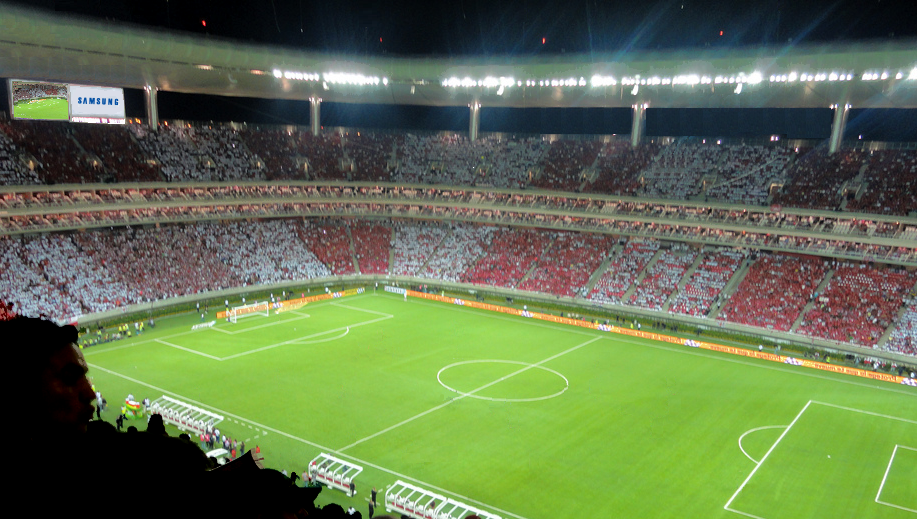
Omnilife Stadium will host the opening and closing ceremonies of the 2011 Pan American Games

The 2011 Pan American Games were held in Guadalajara, Mexico and surrounding area. The Pan American Games ran from October 14 to October 30, 2011.

This is a list of competition venues that were used during the 2011 Pan American Games in Guadalajara, Mexico.

35 Venues were used, with a majority of them being built for the games.

== Competition venues ==
Venue	Location	Sports	Capacity	Status
Omnilife Stadium	Guadalajara	Football; Ceremonies	49,850; 51,000	Existing
Scotiabank Aquatics Center	Zapopan	Diving; Swimming; Synchronized swimming Water polo	4,656	New
Pan American Archery Stadium	Guadalajara	Archery	940	New
Estadio Telmex de Atletismo	Guadalajara	Athletics	15,000	New
Multipurpose Gymnasium	Guadalajara	Badminton; Fencing	856	New
CODE Dome	Guadalajara	Basketball; Table tennis	3,528	Renovated
Basque Pelota Complex	Guadalajara	Basque pelota	1,686	New
Tapatío Bowling Alley	Guadalajara	Bowling	281	Existing
CODE San Nicolás	Guadalajara	Cycling (BMX)	991	Existing
Pan American Marathon Circuit	Guadalajara	Athletics (walks and marathons)	-	Temporary
Pan American Cycling Route	Guadalajara	Cycling (road)	-	Temporary
Pan American Velodrome	Guadalajara	Cycling (track)	1,984	New
Guadalajara Country Club	Guadalajara	Equestrian	2,500	Renovated
Santa Sofia Golf Club	Guadalajara	Equestrian (eventing)	35,000	Existing
Hipica Club	Guadalajara	Equestrian (dressage/jumping); Modern pentathlon	2,500	New
Tlaquepaque Stadium	Tlaquepaque	Rugby sevens	1,156	Existing
Nissan Gymnastics Stadium	Guadalajara	Gymnastics	3,434	New
San Rafael Gymnasium	Guadalajara	Handball	2,822	New
Pan American Hockey Stadium	Guadalajara	Field hockey	1,870	New
CODE II Gymnasium	Guadalajara	Judo; Taekwondo; Wrestling	2,229	New
Racquetball Complex	Guadalajara	Racquetball	636	Renovated
Pan American Skating Track	Guadalajara	Roller skating	820	New
Pan American Softball Stadium	Guadalajara	Softball	798	New
Pan American Shooting Polygon	Guadalajara	Shooting (rifle and pistol events)	438	New
Jalisco Hunting Club	Guadalajara	Shooting (shotgun events)	1,000	Existing
Squash Complex	Guadalajara	Squash	280	Existing
Telcel Tennis Complex	Guadalajara	Tennis	2,592	New
Pan American Volleyball Stadium	Guadalajara	Volleyball	3,152	New
Boca Laguna Water Ski Track	Chapala	Water skiing	1,360	Existing
Weightlifting Forum	Guadalajara	Weightlifting	902	New
Rowing and Canoeing Course	Ciudad Guzmán	Canoeing; Rowing	1,080	New
Pan American Beach Volleyball Stadium	Puerto Vallarta	Beach volleyball	2,450	Temporary
Vallarta Yacht Club	Puerto Vallarta	Sailing	-	Temporary
API Maritime Terminal	Puerto Vallarta	Swimming (open water); Triathlon	850	Temporary
Pan American Mountain Bike Circuit	Tapalpa	Cycling (Mountain biking)	230	Temporary
Pan American Baseball Stadium	Lagos de Moreno	Baseball	3,767	New

== See also ==
- 2011 Pan American Games
