= Triathlon at the 2011 Pan American Games – Men's =

Triathlon – Men's individual at the 2011 Pan American Games
- Venue: API Maritime Terminal
- Dates: October 23
- Competitors: 40 from 22 nations

Medalists
Gold medal	Reinaldo Colucci	Brazil
Silver medal	Manuel Huerta	United States
Bronze medal	Brent McMahon	Canada

The men's individual competition of the triathlon events at the 2011 Pan American Games was held on October 23 at the API Maritime Terminal in Puerto Vallarta. The defending Pan American Games champion is Andy Potts of the United States.

The race was held over the "international distance" and consisted of 1,500 metres (0.93 mi) swimming, 40 kilometres (25 mi), road bicycling, and 10 kilometres (6.2 mi) road running.

The winner Reinaldo Colucci of Brazil qualifies to compete in the triathlon competitions at the 2012 Summer Olympics in London, Great Britain.

== Schedule ==
All times are Central Standard Time (UTC-6).

Date	Time	Round
October 23, 2011	11:05	Final

== Results ==
=== Race ===
40 competitors from 22 countries are scheduled to compete.

Rank	Rider	Time
1st place, gold medalist(s)	Reinaldo Colucci (BRA)	1:48:02
2nd place, silver medalist(s)	Manuel Huerta (USA)	1:48:09
3rd place, bronze medalist(s)	Brent McMahon (CAN)	1:48:23
4	Kyle Jones (CAN)	1:48:45
5	Diogo Martins (BRA)	1:49:49
6	Tyler Butterfield (BER)	1:50:03
7	Jason Wilson (BAR)	1:50:09
8	Felipe Van de Wyngard (CHI)	1:50:14
9	Michel Gonzalez (CUB)	1:50:47
10	Matthew Chrabot (USA)	1:50:58
11	Leonardo Chacon (CRC)	1:50:59
12	Carlos Quinchara (COL)	1:51:26
13	Crisanto Grajales (MEX)	1:51:52
14	Bruno Matheus (BRA)	1:52:08
15	Luciano Taccone (ARG)	1:52:12
16	Arturo Garza (MEX)	1:52:31
17	Yolexy Rodriguez (CUB)	1:53:03
18	Francisco Serrano (MEX)	1:53:04
19	Edgardo Velez (PUR)	1:53:44
20	Gerardo Vergara (GUA)	1:54:01
21	Gonzalo Tellechea (ARG)	1:54:37
22	Leandro Lobo (VEN)	1:55:06
23	Mark Fretta (USA)	1:55:08
24	Oscar Preciado (COL)	1:55:41
25	Luis Barraza (CHI)	1:57:37
26	Luciano Farias (ARG)	1:57:42
27	Martin Oliver (URU)	1:58:16
28	Carlos Fisher (VEN)	2:03:40
29	Fabian Flores (GUA)	2:03:58
30	Roger Rodriguez (CRC)	2:04:28
31	Carlos Perez (VEN)	2:05:54
32	Paolo Loja (ECU)	2:09:04
33	Gaspar Riveros (CHI)	2:11:16
34	Morgan Locke (ISV)	2:12:54
–	Francisco Lopez (NCA)	DNF
–	Jose Espinoza (BOL)	DNF
–	Carlos Hernandez (VEN)	DNF
–	Dereck Mori (PER)	LAP
–	Juan Andrade (ECU)	LAP
–	Billy Gordon (PAN)	LAP
