= Roller skating at the 2011 Pan American Games – Men's free skating =

Men's free skating at the 2011 Pan American Games
- Venue: Pan American Skating Track
- Dates: October 23–24
- Competitors: 7 from 7 nations

Medalists
Gold medal	Marcel Stürmer	Brazil
Silver medal	Daniel Arriola	Argentina
Bronze medal	Leonardo Parrado	Colombia

The men's free skating competition of the roller skating events at the 2011 Pan American Games was held between October 23 and 24 at the Pan American Skating Track in Guadalajara. The defending Pan American Games champion is Marcel Sturmer of Brazil.

== Schedule ==
All times are Central Standard Time (UTC-6).

Date	Time	Round
October 23, 2011	17:15	Short program
October 24, 2011	18:00	Long program

== Results ==
7 athletes from 7 countries competed.

Rank	Name	Nation	Total points	SP	LP
1st place, gold medalist(s)	Marcel Stürmer	Brazil	533.20	1	1
2nd place, silver medalist(s)	Daniel Arriola	Argentina	513.10	2	2
3rd place, bronze medalist(s)	Leonardo Parrado	Colombia	493.00	3	3
4	John Burchfield	United States	486.00	4	4
5	Jose Luis Diaz	Chile	469.60	5	5
6	Orlando Garcia	Mexico	433.00	6	6
7	Daniel Curbelo	Cuba	416.20	7	7
