= Triathlon at the 2011 Pan American Games – Women's =

Triathlon – Women's individual at the 2011 Pan American Games
- Venue: API Maritime Terminal
- Dates: October 23
- Competitors: 29 from 16 nations

Medalists
Gold medal	Sarah Haskins	United States
Silver medal	Bárbara Riveros Díaz	Chile
Bronze medal	Pamella Nascimento	Brazil

The women's individual competition of the triathlon events at the 2011 Pan American Games was held on October 23 at the API Maritime Terminal in Puerto Vallarta. The defending Pan American Games champion is Julie Ertel of the United States.

The race was held over the "international distance" and consisted of 1,500 metres (0.93 mi) swimming, 40 kilometres (25 mi), road bicycling, and 10 kilometres (6.2 mi) road running.

The winner Sarah Haskins of the United States qualifies to compete in the triathlon competitions at the 2012 Summer Olympics in London, Great Britain.

== Schedule ==
All times are Central Standard Time (UTC-6).

Date	Time	Round
October 23, 2011	8:15	Final

== Results ==
=== Race ===
29 competitors from 16 countries are scheduled to compete.

Rank	Rider	Time
1st place, gold medalist(s)	Sarah Haskins (USA)	1:57:37
2nd place, silver medalist(s)	Bárbara Riveros Díaz (CHI)	2:00:23
3rd place, bronze medalist(s)	Pamella Nascimento (BRA)	2:00:32
4	Gwen Jorgensen (USA)	2:00:54
5	Kathy Tremblay (CAN)	2:01:13
6	Claudia Rivas (MEX)	2:02:18
7	Elizabeth Bravo (ECU)	2:03:34
8	Flora Duffy (BER)	2:03:38
9	Michelle Flip (MEX)	2:03:51
10	Carolina Grimaldo (COL)	2:04:29
11	Romina Palacio (ARG)	2:04:40
12	Flavia Fernandes (BRA)	2:05:27
13	Sara McLarty (USA)	2:05:49
14	Alia Cardinale (CRC)	2:06:58
15	Favia Diaz (CHI)	2:07:33
16	Melissa Rios (PUR)	2:07:33
17	Militza Rios (PUR)	2:10:31
–	Ana Aguirre (ARG)	DNF
–	Rosemary Lopez (VEN)	DNF
–	Romina Biagioli (ARG)	LAP
–	Diana Vizcarra (ECU)	LAP
–	Mayra Vargas (COL)	LAP
–	Tania Sapoznik (PAR)	LAP
–	Maydelin Justo (CUB)	LAP
–	Valentina Carvallo (CHI)	DSQ
–	Marleny Schoenfeld (GUA)	DSQ
–	Daniela Schoenfeld (GUA)	DSQ
–	Virginia Lopez (URU)	DSQ
–	Anahi Leon (MEX)	DSQ
