= Roller skating at the 2011 Pan American Games – Women's free skating =

Women's free skating at the 2011 Pan American Games
- Venue: Pan American Skating Track
- Dates: October 23–24
- Competitors: 11 from 11 nations

Medalists
Gold medal	Elizabeth Soler	Argentina
Silver medal	Marisol Villarroel	Chile
Bronze medal	Talitha Hass	Brazil

The women's free skating competition of the roller skating events at the 2011 Pan American Games was held between October 23 and 24 at the Pan American Skating Track in Guadalajara. The defending Pan American Games champion is Elizabeth Soler of Argentina, in fact all three defending medalists repeated with the same performance at these games.

== Schedule ==
All times are Central Standard Time (UTC-6).

Date	Time	Round
October 23, 2011	18:00	Short program
October 24, 2011	17:00	Long program

== Results ==
11 athletes from 11 countries competed.

Rank	Name	Nation	Total points	SP	LP
1st place, gold medalist(s)	Elizabeth Soler	Argentina	516.50	1	1
2nd place, silver medalist(s)	Marisol Villarroel	Chile	494.40	2	2
3rd place, bronze medalist(s)	Talitha Hass	Brazil	484.60	4	3
4	Nataly Otalora	Colombia	481.90	3	4
5	Kailah Marci	Canada	461.20	5	5
6	Alejandra Hernandez	Mexico	443.30	6	6
7	Lucia Rivas	Uruguay	442.00	10	7
8	Brittany Pricer	United States	441.20	7	9
9	Marie Koesnodihardjo	Puerto Rico	433.00	9	8
10	Valentina Basagila	Paraguay	416.10	8	10
11	Jessica Gonzalez	Cuba	405.90	11	11
