= Fencing at the 2011 Pan American Games – Men's foil =

Men's foil at the 2011 Pan American Games
- Venue: Multipurpose Gymnasium
- Dates: October 25
- Competitors: 18 from 10 nations

Medalists
Gold medal	Alexander Massialas	United States
Silver medal	Felipe Alvear	Chile
Bronze medal	Antonio Leal	Venezuela
Bronze medal	Guilherme Toldo	Brazil

The men's foil competition of the fencing events at the 2011 Pan American Games in Guadalajara, Mexico, was held on October 25 at the Multipurpose Gymnasium. The defending champion was Andras Horanyi from the United States.

The foil competition consisted of a qualification round followed by a single-elimination bracket with a bronze medal match between the two semifinal losers. Fencing was done to 15 touches or to the completion of three three-minute rounds if neither fencer reached 15 touches by then. At the end of time, the higher-scoring fencer was the winner; a tie resulted in an additional one-minute sudden-death time period. This sudden-death period was further modified by the selection of a draw-winner beforehand; if neither fencer scored a touch during the minute, the predetermined draw-winner won the bout.

== Schedule ==
All times are Central Standard Time (UTC-6).

Date	Time	Round
October 25, 2011	9:00	Qualification pools
October 25, 2011	11:10	Round of 16
October 25, 2011	12:00	Quarterfinals
October 25, 2011	19:00	Semifinals
October 25, 2011	20:10	Final

== Results ==
=== Qualification ===
All 18 fencers were put into three groups of six athletes, were each fencer would have five individual matches. The top 16 athletes overall would qualify for next round.

Rank	Name	Nation	Victories	TG	TR	Dif.	Notes
1	Miles Chamley-Watson	United States	5	25	10	+15	Q
2	Daniel Gomez	Mexico	4	24	10	+14	Q
3	Anthony Prymack	Canada	4	24	11	+13	Q
4	Pedro Mogena	Cuba	4	22	15	+7	Q
5	Alexander Massialas	United States	3	20	16	+4	Q
6	Antonio Leal	Venezuela	3	22	19	+3	Q
7	Rubén Silva	Chile	3	19	16	+3	Q
8	Etienne Turbide	Canada	3	22	21	+1	Q
9	Federico Muller	Argentina	3	15	18	-3	Q
10	Felipe Alvear	Chile	2	21	20	+1	Q
11	Carlos Rodriguez	Venezuela	2	19	21	-2	Q
12	Angelo Justiniano	Puerto Rico	2	15	17	-2	Q
13	Raul Arizaga	Mexico	2	15	19	-4	Q
14	Yosniel Alavarez	Cuba	2	15	21	-6	Q
15	Felipe Saucedo	Argentina	1	15	21	-6	Q
16	Guilherme Toldo	Brazil	1	13	23	-10	Q
17	Heitor Shimbo	Brazil	1	12	22	-10	
18	Rodrigo Casamalhuapa	El Salvador	0	7	25	-18	

=== Elimination round ===
Round of 16
1	Miles Chamley-Watson (USA)	13
16	Guilherme Toldo (BRA)	15
9	Federico Muller (ARG)	8
8	Etienne Turbide (CAN)	15
5	Alexander Massialas (USA)	15
12	Angelo Justiniano (PUR)	4
13	Raul Arizaga (MEX)	15
4	Pedro Mogena (CUB)	10
3	Anthony Prymack (CAN)	15
14	Yosniel Alavarez (CUB)	12
11	Carlos Rodriguez (VEN)	6
6	Antonio Leal (VEN)	15
7	Rubén Silva (CHI)	12
10	Felipe Alvear (CHI)	13
15	Felipe Saucedo (ARG)	4
2	Daniel Gomez (MEX)	15

Quarterfinals
16	Guilherme Toldo (BRA)	15
8	Etienne Turbide (CAN)	7
5	Alexander Massialas (USA)	15
13	Raul Arizaga (MEX)	6
3	Anthony Prymack (CAN)	12
6	Antonio Leal (VEN)	15
10	Felipe Alvear (CHI)	15
2	Daniel Gomez (MEX)	12

Semifinals
16	Guilherme Toldo (BRA)	7
5	Alexander Massialas (USA)	15
6	Antonio Leal (VEN)	14
10	Felipe Alvear (CHI)	15

Final
5	Alexander Massialas (USA)	15
10	Felipe Alvear (CHI)	5
