= Catherine Peñán =

Chilean inline speed skater

Personal information
- Full name: Catherine Elizabeth Peñán Paillacar
- Born: 16 April 1989 (age 37) Santiago, Chile

Sport
- Country: Chile
- Sport: Speed skating
Medal record
Pan American Games
Bronze medal – third place	2011 Guadalajara	10,000 metres points + elimination race

Catherine Elizabeth Peñán Paillacar (born 16 April 1989) is a Chilean inline speed skater.

== Career ==
In the 2003 World Cup, held in Barquisimeto, Venezuela, Peñán won a silver medal and four bronze medals. At the 2005 World Cup, held in China, she won a bronze medal, a silver medal and a gold medal. In the 2006 World Cup, held in South Korea, she won three gold and one silver medals, becoming the best placed in the youth ladies category. That same year, at the 2006 South American Games, she won a gold medal, a silver medal, and a bronze medal. Before the World Cup in South Korea and being a promising figure in world skating, Peñán received offers to go compete in Germany. Later, after her successful performance and showing a notorious superiority in said tournament, Peñán finally decided to go to Switzerland to compete for the Rollerblade team, where she was an official member of this team in 2007 and 2008.

Peñán won a bronze medal at the 2011 Pan American Games held in Guadalajara, Mexico.

== Personal life ==
Peñán is the daughter of Pedro Peñán and María Payacán and is of Mapuche descent.

In the media, she became better known in her country for her appearance on the game show Who Wants to Be a Millionaire? (Canal 13), where she was represented by sports journalist Soledad Bacarreza. She also appeared on Chilevisión's Series Nacionales, which followed up on her preparation for the World Cup in Korea, including interviews and showing her intimacy with her family.

In 2010, Peñán had her first child.
