= Water skiing at the 2011 Pan American Games – Men's jump =

Men's jump at the 2011 Pan American Games
- Venue: Boca Laguna Water Ski Track
- Dates: October 21 – October 23
- Competitors: 11 from 7 nations

The men's jump competition of the Water skiing events at the 2011 Pan American Games in Guadalajara were held from October 21 to October 23 at the Boca Laguna Water Ski Track. The defending champion was Jaret Llewellyn of Canada.

== Schedule ==
All times are Central Standard time (UTC-6).

Date	Start	Round
Friday, October 21	9:00	Semifinals
Sunday, October 23	9:00	Finals

== Results ==
=== Preliminaries ===
The top eight qualify for the final.

Rank	Name	Nationality	Score	Notes
1	Frederick Krueger IV	United States	67.40	q
2	Thomas Magnowski	Canada	62.10	q
3	Rodrigo Miranda	Chile	61.40	q
4	Esteban Siegert	Colombia	58.80	q
5	Javier Julio	Argentina	57.10	q
6	Felipe Miranda	Chile	55.20	q
7	Alejandro Robledo	Colombia	53.00	q
8	Alejandro Lamadrid	Mexico	52.00	q
9	Mario Mustafa	Peru	50.40	
10	Martin Malarczuk	Argentina	44.50	
	Jorge Renosto	Argentina	0	DNS
