= Water skiing at the 2011 Pan American Games – Men's tricks =

Men's tricks at the 2011 Pan American Games
- Venue: Boca Laguna Water Ski Track
- Dates: October 20 – October 23
- Competitors: 11 from 6 nations

The men's tricks competition of the Water skiing events at the 2011 Pan American Games in Guadalajara were held from October 20 to October 23 at the Boca Laguna Water Ski Track. The defending champion was Jaret Llewellyn of Canada.

== Schedule ==
All times are Central Standard time (UTC-6).

Date	Start	Round
Thursday, October 20	9:00	Preliminaries
Sunday, October 23	9:00	Finals

== Results ==
=== Preliminaries ===
The top eight qualify for the final.

Rank	Name	Nationality	Score	Notes
1	Javier Julio	Argentina	10040	q
2	Jorge Renosto	Argentina	8820	q
3	Russell Gay	United States	8560	q
4	Felipe Miranda	Chile	8550	q
5	Rodrigo Miranda	Chile	8480	q
6	Alejandro Robledo	Colombia	7310	q
7	Alejandro Lamadrid	Mexico	6740	q
8	Jason McClintock	Canada	5310	q
9	Esteban Siegert	Colombia	2810	
	Martin Malarczuk	Argentina	0	DNS
	Thomas Magnowski	Canada	0	DNS
