= Weightlifting at the 2011 Pan American Games – Women's 75 kg =

Weightlifting – Women's 75 kg at the 2011 Pan American Games
- Venue: Weightlifting Forum
- Dates: October 26
- Competitors: 6 from 5 nations

Medalists
Gold medal	Ubaldina Valoyes	Colombia
Silver medal	Maria Valdes	Chile
Bronze medal	Maria Alvarez	Venezuela

The women's 75 kg competition of the weightlifting events at the 2011 Pan American Games in Guadalajara, Mexico, was held on October 26 at the Weightlifting Forum. The defending champion was Ubaldina Valoyes from Colombia.

Each lifter performed in both the snatch and clean and jerk lifts, with the final score being the sum of the lifter's best result in each. The athlete received three attempts in each of the two lifts; the score for the lift was the heaviest weight successfully lifted. This weightlifting event was the second heaviest women's event at the weightlifting competition, limiting competitors to a maximum of 75 kilograms of body mass.

== Schedule ==
All times are Central Standard Time (UTC-6).

Date	Time	Round
October 26, 2011	16:00	Final

== Results ==
6 athletes from 5 countries took part.

- PR – Pan American Games record

Rank	Name	Country	Group	B.weight (kg)	Snatch (kg)	Clean & Jerk (kg)	Total (kg)
1st place, gold medalist(s)	Ubaldina Valoyes	Colombia	A	74.13	113 PR	137	250
2nd place, silver medalist(s)	Maria Valdes	Chile	A	74.30	100	129	229
3rd place, bronze medalist(s)	Maria Alvarez	Venezuela	A	74.42	100	128	228
4	Yarvanis Herrera	Venezuela	A	72.64	104	123	227
5	Odeysis Pelegrin	Cuba	A	73.96	83	119	193
–	Jaqueline Ferreira	Brazil	A	73.40			DNF

== New records ==
The following records were established and improved upon during the competition.

Snatch	113.0 kg	Ubaldina Valoyes (COL)	PR
