= Triathlon at the 2011 Pan American Games =

- Venue: API Maritime Terminal
- Dates: October 23
- Competitors: 70

The Triathlon competitions at the 2011 Pan American Games were held on Sunday, October 23 at the API Maritime Terminal in Puerto Vallarta. Both the men's and women's events were held on the same day.

== Medal summary ==
=== Medal table ===
| Rank | Nation | Gold | Silver | Bronze | Total |
|---|---|---|---|---|---|
| 1 | United States | 1 | 1 | 0 | 2 |
| 2 | Brazil | 1 | 0 | 1 | 2 |
| 3 | Chile | 0 | 1 | 0 | 1 |
| 4 | Canada | 0 | 0 | 1 | 1 |
| Totals (4 entries) | | 2 | 2 | 2 | 6 |

=== Medal events ===
| Event | Gold | Silver | Bronze |
|---|---|---|---|
| Men's individual | Reinaldo Colucci; Brazil | Manuel Huerta; United States | Brent McMahon; Canada |
| Women's individual | Sarah Haskins; United States | Bárbara Riveros Díaz; Chile | Pamella Nascimento; Brazil |

== Schedule ==
All times are Central Daylight time (UTC-5).

| Day | Date | Start | Finish | Event | Phase |
|---|---|---|---|---|---|
| Day 10 | Sunday, October 23 | 8:00 | 14:00 | Women's Triathlon | Final |
| Day 10 | Sunday, October 23 | 8:00 | 14:00 | Men's Triathlon | Final |

== Qualification ==
There will be a quota of 70 athletes (40 men and 30 women). Each NOC is allowed to enter a maximum of 3 men and 3 women. The hosts Mexico is guaranteed 6 spots, either through qualifying or through a guaranteed host nation place. An athlete does not qualify through this system, rather he/she qualifies a spot for their nation, an athlete may not qualify more than 1 quota spot.

=== Participating nations ===
| NOC | Men | Women | Total |
|---|---|---|---|
| Argentina | 3 | 2 | 5 |
| Barbados | 1 | | 1 |
| Bermuda | 1 | 1 | 2 |
| Bolivia | 1 | | 1 |
| Brazil | 3 | 3 | 6 |
| Canada | 2 | 1 | 3 |
| Chile | 3 | 3 | 6 |
| Colombia | 2 | 2 | 4 |
| Costa Rica | 2 | 1 | 3 |
| Cuba | 2 | 1 | 3 |
| Ecuador | 2 | 2 | 4 |
| El Salvador | 1 | | 1 |
| Guatemala | 2 | 1 | 3 |
| Mexico | 3 | 3 | 6 |
| Nicaragua | 1 | | 1 |
| Panama | 1 | | 1 |
| Paraguay | | 1 | 1 |
| Puerto Rico | 1 | 2 | 3 |
| United States | 3 | 3 | 6 |
| Uruguay | 1 | 1 | 2 |
| Venezuela | 3 | 1 | 4 |
| Virgin Islands | 1 | | 1 |
| Total athletes | 39 | 28 | 65 |
| Total NOCs | 21 | 13 | 22 |
