= Weightlifting at the 2015 Pan American Games – Women's 75 kg =

Weightlifting – Women's 75 kg at the 2015 Pan American Games
- Venue: Oshawa Sports Centre
- Dates: July 14
- Competitors: 6 from 5 nations

Medalists
Gold medal	Ubaldina Valoyes	Colombia
Silver medal	Fernanda Valdés	Chile
Bronze medal	Jaqueline Ferreira	Brazil

The women's 75 kg competition of the weightlifting events at the 2015 Pan American Games in Toronto, Canada, was a competition of women's weightlifting held on July 14, 2015 at the Oshawa Sports Centre. The defending champion was Ubaldina Valoyes from Colombia.

== Schedule ==
All times are Eastern Daylight Time (UTC-4).

Date	Time	Round
July 14, 2015	19:00	Final

== Results ==
6 athletes from five countries took part.

Rank	Name	Country	Group	B.weight (kg)	Snatch (kg)	Clean & Jerk (kg)	Total (kg)
1st place, gold medalist(s)	Ubaldina Valoyes	Colombia	A	74.56	112	135	247
2nd place, silver medalist(s)	Fernanda Valdés	Chile	A	74.79	100	131	231
3rd place, bronze medalist(s)	Jaqueline Ferreira	Brazil	A	74.55	105	125	230
4	Marie-Ève Beauchemin-Nadeau	Canada	A	72.35	98	127	225
5	Prabdeep Sanghera	Canada	A	73.73	100	119	219
6	Daysi Hutchinson	Costa Rica	A	74.14	90	110	200
