= Water skiing at the 2011 Pan American Games =

- Venue: Boca Laguna Water Ski Track
- Dates: October 20 – October 23
- Competitors: 38 from 9 nations

Water skiing competitions at the 2011 Pan American Games in Guadalajara were held from October 20 to October 23 at the Boca Laguna Water Ski Track.

== Medal summary ==
=== Medal table ===
* Host nation (Mexico)

Rank	Nation	Gold	Silver	Bronze	Total
1	United States	6	0	1	7
2	Argentina	2	0	1	3
3	Canada	1	5	3	9
4	Chile	0	2	3	5
5	Brazil	0	1	0	1
5	Colombia	0	1	0	1
7	Mexico*	0	0	1	1
Totals (7 entries)		9	9	9	27

=== Men's events ===
Event	Gold	Silver	Bronze
Tricks	Javier Julio; Argentina	Jason McClintock; Canada	Felipe Miranda; Chile
Slalom	Jonathan Travers; United States	Jason McClintock; Canada	Carlos Lamadrid; Mexico
Jump	Frederick Krueger IV; United States	Rodrigo Miranda; Chile	Felipe Miranda; Chile
Overall	Javier Julio; Argentina	Felipe Miranda; Chile	Rodrigo Miranda; Chile
Wakeboard	Andrew Adkison; United States	Marcelo Giardi; Brazil	Alejo de Palma; Argentina

=== Women's events ===
Event	Gold	Silver	Bronze
Tricks	Whitney McClintock; Canada	Maria Linares; Colombia	Regina Jaquess; United States
Slalom	Regina Jaquess; United States	Whitney McClintock; Canada	Karen Stevens; Canada
Jump	Regina Jaquess; United States	Whitney McClintock; Canada	Karen Stevens; Canada
Overall	Regina Jaquess; United States	Whitney McClintock; Canada	Karen Stevens; Canada

== Schedule ==
All times are Central Daylight time (UTC-5).

Day	Date	Start	Finish	Event	Phase
Day 7	Thursday, October 20	9:00	14:40	Wakeboard & Men's/Women's tricks	Semifinals
Day 8	Friday, October 21	9:00	16:00	Men's/Women's slalom/jump	Semifinals
Day 9	Saturday, October 22	9:00	15:08	Wakeboard & Men's/Women's overall	Finals
Day 10	Sunday, October 23	9:00	14:28	Men's/Women's jump, slalom and tricks	Finals

== Qualification ==
The top seven countries at the 2010 Pan American Championship in Santiago, Chile + Mexico can send a maximum of 4 athletes (up to 3 for any gender) + one wakeboard athlete. All other countries can enter a maximum of 2 athletes (1 male and 1 female) and 1 wakeboard athlete. The maximum quota is 40 male, 32 female and 8 wakeboard (male only) athletes (80 total). The wakeboard category is full, so countries not qualified can only send water skiers, if they meet the minimum requirements.

=== Entries ===
The following countries will participate:

Nation	Men					Women				Quotas	Athletes
Nation	Tricks	Slalom	Jump	Overall	Wakeboard	Tricks	Slalom	Jump	Overall	Quotas	Athletes
Argentina	3	3	3	3	1	1		1		15	5
Brazil			2	1	1	1		1		6	4
Canada	2	1	2	1	1	2	2	2	2	15	5
Chile	2	2	2	2		2	2	2	2	16	4
Colombia	2	2	3	2	1	1	1	1	1	14	5
Ecuador					1					1	1
Mexico	1	1	3	1	1	1	1	1	1	12	5
Peru		1	1	1	1	2	1	2	1	9	5
United States	1	1	1		1					4	4
Total: 9 NOCs	11	11	17	10	8	10	7	10	7	92	38
