= Manuel Huerta =

Cuban-American triathlete (born 1984)

Personal information
- Born: March 22, 1984 (age 42) Havana, Cuba
Medal record
Men's Triathlon
Representing the United States
Pan American Games
| Silver medal – second place | 2011 Guadalajara | Individual |

Manuel "Manny" Huerta (born March 22, 1984) is a Cuban-born triathlete. After emigrating from Cuba to the United States as a young man, Huerta began training as a professional triathlete. For the United States he won the silver medal in men's triathlon at the 2011 Pan American Games and in 2012 qualified as a member of the United States Olympic Team. In 2013, he left the US Olympic Team to compete for the Puerto Rico Olympic Team.

== Early life ==
Huerta was born on March 22, 1984, in Havana, Cuba. He first began training as an athlete in Cuba, waking before 5:00 AM each morning to swim at the Marcelo Salado pool in Havana. At age six, after practicing alongside the Cuban national swimming team, Huerta first began to think of competing in the Olympics himself, and two years later watched on television as Cuban athletes participated in the 1992 Summer Olympics in Barcelona, Spain. At age 13, he competed in his first triathlon, placing first in the Cuban IronKids national championship. Soon afterwards, in November, 1997, Huerta left Cuba along with his sister and mother to emigrate to the United States. Arriving in Miami, Florida, the family joined his grandmother, who had herself come to the United States during the Mariel boatlift.

During high school, Huerta joined a triathlon club and competed in cross-country. He received a scholarship to attend Florida Atlantic University. At age 20, he became a naturalized United States citizen.

== Athletic career ==
In 2003, Huerta was invited to train for the triathlon at the United States Olympic Training Center in Colorado Springs. Over the following years, he had trouble with injuries and encountered challenges in finding sponsors, in addition to losing his father in 2009. However, by 2011, Huerta was able to qualify to compete in the 2011 Pan American Games in Guadalajara, Mexico. There, he placed a close second to Brazil's Reinaldo Colucci, winning the silver medal.

On May 12, 2012, Huerta qualified for the 2012 Summer Olympics in London during the United States Olympic Team trials in San Diego. After finishing fourth during the swimming portion, he posted strong times in the biking and running portions of the race. Americans needed to finish in the top nine to qualify, and Huerta finished in ninth place. Both prior to and after qualifying for the Olympics, Huerta trained on the side of an active volcano in Costa Rica.
