= Marcel Stürmer =

Brazilian artistic roller skater (born 1985)

Personal information
- Full name: Marcel Ruschel Stürmer
- Born: 27 July 1985 (age 40) Lajeado, RS
Medal record
Men's artistic roller skating
Representing Brazil
World Games
Gold medal – first place	2013 Cali	Individual
World Championship
Silver medal – second place	2011 Brasília	Individual
Silver medal – second place	2012 Auckland	Individual
Bronze medal – third place	2008 Kaohsiung	Individual
Bronze medal – third place	2010 Portimão	Individual
Pan American Games
Gold medal – first place	2003 Santo Domingo	Individual
Gold medal – first place	2007 Rio de Janeiro	Individual
Gold medal – first place	2011 Guadalajara	Individual
Gold medal – first place	2015 Toronto	Individual
South American Games
Silver medal – second place	2010 Medellín	Individual

Marcel Ruschel Stürmer (born 27 July 1985) is a Brazilian artistic roller skater.

Born in Lajeado, RS, Stürmer is generally considered Brazil's best skater ever, judging by the number of titles won throughout his career.
