= Felipe Miranda =

Chilean water skier (born 1986)

Personal information
- Born: May 10, 1986 (age 40)
Medal record
Water Skiing
Representing Chile
Pan American Games
| Gold medal – first place | 2015 Toronto | Overall |
| Silver medal – second place | 2011 Guadalajara | Overall |
| Silver medal – second place | 2019 Lima | Jump |
| Bronze medal – third place | 2007 Rio de Janeiro | Slalom |
| Bronze medal – third place | 2011 Guadalajara | Tricks |
| Bronze medal – third place | 2011 Guadalajara | Jump |
Bolivarian Beach Games
| Gold medal – first place | 2012 Lima | Tricks |
| Gold medal – first place | 2012 Lima | Slalom |
| Gold medal – first place | 2012 Lima | Overall |
| Silver medal – second place | 2012 Lima | Jump |

Felipe Cristian Miranda Arellano (born May 10, 1986) is a Chilean professional Water-skier who has represented his country in two Pan American Games winning one silver and 3 bronze medals. Felipe won three golds at the first Bolivarian Beach Games.

== Personal life ==
Felipe is the younger brother of Rodrigo Miranda, also a professional Water-skier. Both brothers dominate the South American circuit.
