= Pâmella Oliveira =

Brazilian triathlete (born 1987)

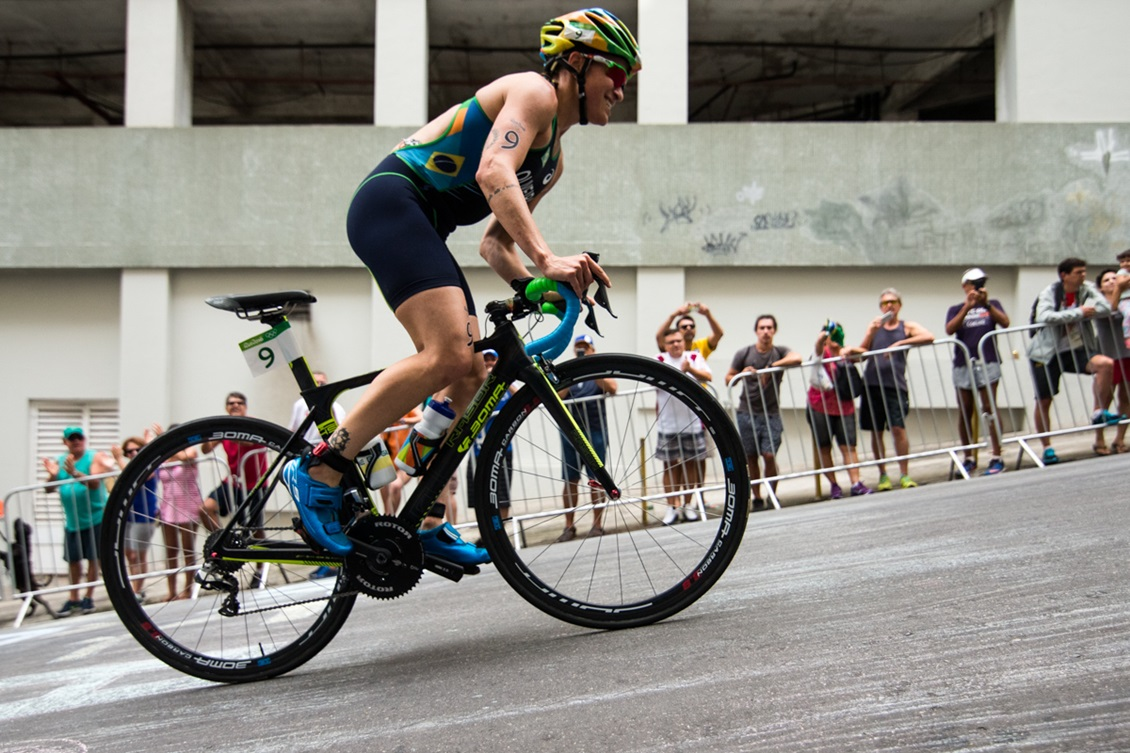
- Oliveira at the 2016 Summer Olympics

Personal information
- Full name: Pâmella Nascimento de Oliveira
- Born: 7 October 1987 (age 38) Vila Velha, Brazil
- Height: 165 cm (5 ft 5 in)
- Weight: 58 kg (128 lb)

Sport
- Country: Brazil
- Sport: Triathlon
Medal record
Women's triathlon
Representing Brazil
Pan American Games
Bronze medal – third place	2011 Guadalajara	Women's

Pâmella Nascimento de Oliveira (born 7 October 1987) is a Brazilian triathlete. She won a bronze medal at the 2011 Pan American Games. The following year, she competed in the Women's event at the 2012 Summer Olympics, finishing in 30th place. She finished in tenth place in the women's event at the 2015 Pan American Games.
