= Reinaldo Colucci =

Brazilian triathlete (born 1985)

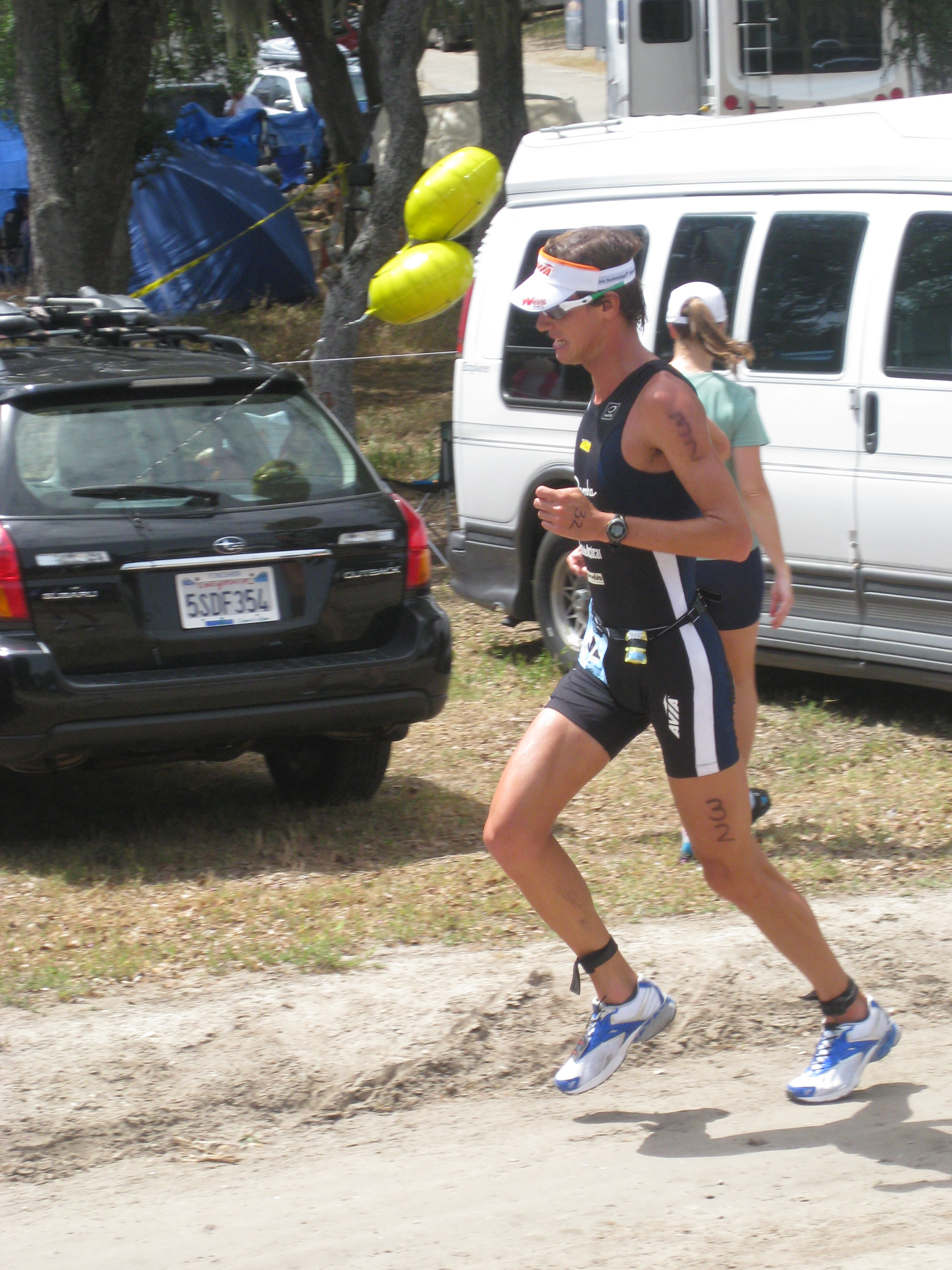

Personal information
- Nationality: Brazil
- Born: 29 August 1985 (age 40) Descalvado, São Paulo, Brazil
Medal record
Representing Brazil
Men's triathlon
Pan American Games
Gold medal – first place	2011 Guadalajara	Triathlon

Reinaldo Colucci (born 29 October 1985) is a Brazilian triathlete.

He competed at the 2008 Summer Olympics men's triathlon, where he finished in 37th place and at the 2012 Summer Olympics men's triathlon, where he finished in 35th place. Colucci won the gold medal at the 2011 Pan American Games in Guadalajara and finished 21st at the 2015 Pan American Games.
