= Roller sports at the 2011 Pan American Games =

- Venue: Pan American Skating Track
- Dates: October 23 – October 27
- Competitors: 57 from 16 nations

Roller sports competitions at the 2011 Pan American Games in Guadalajara were held on October 23 to October 27, 2011 at the Pan American Skating Track.

== Medal summary ==
=== Medal table ===
* Host nation (Mexico)

Rank	Nation	Gold	Silver	Bronze	Total
1	Colombia	5	0	1	6
2	Argentina	1	4	2	7
3	Brazil	1	0	1	2
4	Ecuador	1	0	0	1
5	Chile	0	3	3	6
6	Venezuela	0	1	0	1
7	Mexico*	0	0	1	1
Totals (7 entries)		8	8	8	24

=== Men's events ===
Speed

Event	Gold	Silver	Bronze
300 metres time-trial	Pedro Causil; Colombia	Emanuelle Silva; Chile	Juan Cruz Araldi; Argentina
1000 metres	Pedro Causil; Colombia	Ezequiel Capellano; Argentina	Jorge Reyes; Chile
10,000 metres points + elimination race	Jorge Bolaños; Ecuador	Ezequiel Capellano; Argentina	Jorge Reyes; Chile

Artistic

Event	Gold	Silver	Bronze
Free skating	Marcel Stürmer; Brazil	Daniel Arriola; Argentina	Leonardo Parrado; Colombia

=== Women's events ===
Speed

Event	Gold	Silver	Bronze
300 metres time-trial	Yersy Puello; Colombia	Maria Moya; Chile	Veronica Elias; Mexico
1000 metres	Yersy Puello; Colombia	Sandra Buelvas; Venezuela	Melisa Bonnet; Argentina
10,000 metres points + elimination race	Kelly Martínez; Colombia	Melisa Bonnet; Argentina	Catherine Penan; Chile

Artistic

Event	Gold	Silver	Bronze
Free skating	Elizabeth Soler; Argentina	Marisol Villarroel; Chile	Talitha Haas; Brazil

== Schedule ==
All times are Central Daylight Time (UTC-5).

Day	Date	Start	Finish	Event	Phase
Day 10	Sunday October 23, 2011	17:30	20:00	Men's/Women's	Short program
Day 11	Monday October 24, 2011	17:00	19:00	Men's/Women's	Long program
Day 13	Wednesday October 26, 2011	16:00	19:30	Men's/Women's	300m time-trial race
Day 14	Thursday October 27, 2011	10:00	12:30	Men's/Women's 1,000m	Qualification/Finals
Day 14	Thursday October 27, 2011	19:30	20:45	Men's/Women's 10,000m	Finals

== Qualification ==
The qualification tournament was the 2011 Pan American Championship between March 8 and 13, 2011 in Rosario, Argentina.

=== Qualification summary ===
NOC	Speed		Artistic		Total
NOC	Men	Women	Men	Women	Total
Argentina	2	2	1	1	6
Brazil	0	0	1	1	2
Canada	0	2	0	1	3
Chile	2	2	1	1	6
Colombia	2	2	1	1	6
Costa Rica	0	2	0	0	2
Cuba	2	0	1	1	4
Ecuador	2	0	0	0	2
El Salvador	2	2	0	0	4
Guatemala	2	2	0	0	4
Mexico	2	2	1	1	6
Paraguay	0	0	0	1	1
Puerto Rico	1	0	0	1	2
Uruguay	0	0	0	1	1
United States	1	1	1	1	4
Venezuela	2	2	0	0	4
Total	20	19	7	11	57
