= Rubén Silva =

Uruguayan footballer (born 1964)

Rubén Adrián Silva (born 20 August 1964) is a Uruguayan former professional footballer who played as a defender for clubs of Uruguay, Chile and México.

== Teams ==
- Huracán Buceo 1983–1988
- Nacional 1989
- Cobras de Ciudad Juárez 1989–1990
- Bella Vista 1990
- Defensor Sporting 1991
- Nacional 1992
- Deportes Temuco 1993–1996
- Huracán Buceo 1997
- Danubio 1997
- Huracán Buceo 1998
- Racing Club de Montevideo 1999
- Central Español 2000–2002
- Huracán Buceo 2003–2004
