= Enrique González (equestrian) =

Mexican equestrian (born 1964)

Personal information
- Full name: Enrique González Delgado
- Born: 19 May 1964 (age 62) Mexico City, Mexico

Sport
- Sport: Equestrian
Medal record
Equestrian
Representing Mexico
Pan American Games
Silver medal – second place	2019 Lima	Team jumping

Enrique González Delgado (born 19 May 1964) is a Mexican equestrian. He competed in show jumping at the 2008 Summer Olympics and the 2020 Summer Olympics.
