= Tomás Couve =

Chilean equestrian

Personal information
- Born: 30 June 1972 (age 53) Santiago, Chile

Sport
- Sport: Equestrian

Tomás Couve Correa (born 30 June 1972) is a Chilean equestrian. He competed in two events at the 2012 Summer Olympics.
