= Rodrigo Carrasco =

Chilean equestrian (born 1975)

Personal information
- Born: 18 October 1975 (age 50) Santiago, Chile

Sport
- Sport: Equestrian

Rodrigo Carrasco (born 18 October 1975) is a Chilean equestrian. He competed in two events at the 2012 Summer Olympics.
