= Samuel Parot =

Chilean equestrian (born 1964)

Personal information
- Born: 5 December 1964 (age 61) Talca, Chile
Medal record
Equestrian
Representing Chile
South American Games
Bronze medal – third place	2022 Asuncion	Team jumping

Samuel Parot (born 5 December 1964) is a Chilean equestrian. He competed in two events at the 2012 Summer Olympics. In June 2021, he qualified to represent Chile at the 2020 Summer Olympics.
