= United States Snipe National Championship =

The United States National Snipe Championship is the annual national championship for sailing in the Snipe class. It is among the oldest One-Design class championships in the United States.

Between 1934 and 1947 it was considered the SCIRA World Championship, with the winning skipper receiving the Commodore Hub E. Isaacks Trophy, but as the event became international after World War II, SCIRA's commodore Charles Heinzerling created a separate trophy for the USA champion and since then the winning skipper is awarded the Commodore Charles E. Heinzerling Trophy, and the winning crew is awarded the Portage Lakes Yacht Club Trophy.

When the fleet is large enough, the Snipe Nationals are held in two parts. The first is an elimination series called the Crosby Series, where the Crosby Memorial Trophy is awarded. After three races, the top 33 boats sail in the Heinzerling Series which determines the national champion. The remaining competitors sail in the Wells Series for the Wells Trophy.

Other trophies awarded are the Slauson Memorial Trophy for the second-place team; Eleanor Williams Memorial Trophy for the highest placing woman (skipper or crew); Carolyn Nute Memorial Trophy for the highest placing married couple; Masters Trophy for the highest placing master skipper; Masters Endurance Trophy for the oldest skipper; Macklanburg-Duncan Trophy for the chairman of the Race Committee; National Secretary Trophy for the regatta chairperson.

== Winners ==
Year	Venue	Skipper	Crew	Fleet
1934	New Rochelle Yacht Club	William E. Bracey		Dallas Sailing Club
1935	Dallas Sailing Club	Perry Bass	Jimmie Maxwell	Wichita Falls Sailing Club
1936	Oshkosh Yacht Club	Philip A. Benson, Jr.	Bill Benson	Sea Cliff Yacht Club
1937	Sea Cliff Yacht Club	Arthur M. Deacon		Horseshoe Harbor Yacht Club
1938	Wawasee Yacht Club	Charles Gabor		Lake Mohawk Yacht Club
1939	Los Angeles Yacht Club	Walter Hall	Bob Hall	Lake Merritt Sailing Club
1940	Canandaigua Yacht Club	Darby Metcalf	Fred Schenck	Los Angeles Yacht Club
1941	Fort Worth Boat Club	Darby Metcalf	George Lounsberry	Los Angeles Yacht Club
1942	Crescent Sail Yacht Club	Charles Heinzerling	Ralph Heinzerling	Lake Lakawanna Yacht Club
1945	Chicago Corinthian Yacht Club	Bob White	Betty White	Balboa Yacht Club
1946	Chautauqua Lake Yacht Club	Bob Davis	Ken Davis	Balboa Yacht Club
1947	Marblehead, Massachusetts	Ted A. Wells	Art Lippitt	Wichita Sailing Club
1948	Corpus Christi Sailing Club	Billy Wicker	Robert Vetters	Southwestern Yacht Club (Texas)
1949	Chautauqua Lake Yacht Club	Ted A. Wells	Art Lippitt	Wichita Sailing Club
1950	Long Beach, California	Clark King	Art Lippitt	Newport Harbor Yacht Club
1951	Seaside Park Yacht Club	Francis Seavy	Howard McGaughey	Clearwater Yacht Club
1952	Green Lake Yacht Club	Ted A. Wells	Art Lippitt	Wichita Sailing Club
1953	Lake Murray. Ardmore, Oklahoma	Tom Frost	Fred Schenck	Newport Harbor Yacht Club
1954	Mentor Harbor Yachting Club	Tom Frost	Fred Schenck	Newport Harbor Yacht Club
1955	Atlanta Yacht Club	Harry Allen	Helen O’Leary	Quassapaug Sailing Center
1956	Alamitos Bay Yacht Club	Clark King	Dick Lewis	Newport Harbor Yacht Club
1957	Illinois Valley Yacht Club	Fred Schenck	Jean Schenck	Newport Harbor Yacht Club
1958	Chautauqua Lake Yacht Club	John Wolcott	Ron Payne	Quassapaug Sailing Center
1959	Fort Gibson, Oklahoma	Richard Tillman	Beth Norwood	Atlanta, Georgia
1960	Clearwater Yacht Club	Harry Levinson	Alan Levinson	Indianapolis Sailing Club
1961	Quassapaug Yacht Club	Harry Levinson	Alan Levinson	Indianapolis Sailing Club
1962	Corinthian Yacht Club of Seattle	Leslie Larson	Victor Larson	Chautauqua Lake Yacht Club
1963	Fort Worth Boat Club	Robert Huggins	Eleanor Huggins	Lake Merritt Sailing Club
1964	Mission Bay Yacht Club	Jerry Jenkins	Dave Tippett	Crescent Sail Yacht Club
1965	Illinois Valley Yacht Club	Harry Levinson	Dan Flaherty	Indianapolis Sailing Club
1966	Chautauqua Lake Yacht Club	Earl Elms	Jon Wegand	Mission Bay Yacht Club
1967	Fort Gibson, Oklahoma	Earl Elms	Mike Shear	Mission Bay Yacht Club
1968	Alamitos Bay Yacht Club	Earl Elms	Mike Shear	Mission Bay Yacht Club
1969	Florida Yacht Club	Earl Elms	Mike Shear	Mission Bay Yacht Club
1970	Island Bay Yacht Club	Earl Elms	Craig Martin	Mission Bay Yacht Club
1971	Severn Sailing Association	Roger Stewart	Jerry Stewart	San Diego Yacht Club
1972	Fort Gibson, Oklahoma	Earl Elms	Donnie Bedford	Mission Bay Yacht Club
1973	Mission Bay Yacht Club	David Ullman	Pete Connally	Balboa Yacht Club
1974	Florida Yacht Club	Augie Diaz	Barbara Chesney	Coconut Grove Sailing Club
1975	Green Lake Yacht Club	Jeff Lenhart	Eric Krebs	Mission Bay Yacht Club
1976	U.S. Sailing Center at Association Island	Augie Diaz	Barbara Chesney	Coconut Grove Sailing Club
1977	Chandler's Landing Yacht Club	Tom Nute	Carolyn Nute	Mission Bay Yacht Club
1978	Alamitos Bay Yacht Club	Mark Reynolds	DeAnn Wright	San Diego Yacht Club
1979	Pensacola Yacht Club	Dave Chapin	Tim Dixon	Island Bay Yacht Club
1980	Carlyle Sailing Association	Augie Diaz	Greg Thomas	Coconut Grove Sailing Club
1981	Severn Sailing Association	Dave Chapin	Tim Dixon	Island Bay Yacht Club
1982	Fort Worth Boat Club	Dave Chapin	Todd Gay	Island Bay Yacht Club
1983	Corinthian Yacht Club of Seattle	Doug DeSouza	Jenifer DeSouza	Mission Bay Yacht Club
1984	Southern Yacht Club	Steve Suddath	Connie Suddath	Lake Lanier Sailing Club
1985	Crescent Sail Yacht Club	Steve Rosenberg	Patrick Muglia	Alamitos Bay Yacht Club
1986	Chautauqua Lake Yacht Club	Ed Adams	Meredith Adams	Ida Lewis Yacht Club
1987	Clinton Marina Yacht Club	Steve Callison	Jane Faust	Newport Yacht Club, Rochester
1988	Encinal Yacht Club	Craig Leweck	Chris Raab	Mission Bay Yacht Club
1989	Coral Reef Yacht Club	Craig Leweck	Lisa Manzer	Mission Bay Yacht Club
1990	Severn Sailing Association	Jeff Lenhart	Lianne Randall	Mission Bay Yacht Club
1991	North Cape Yacht Club	Ed Adams	Nancy Haberland	Ida Lewis Yacht Club
1992	Alamitos Bay Yacht Club	Bart Hackworth	Jon Rogers	San Francisco Yacht Club
1993	Mentor Harbor Yachting Club	Doug Clark	Alex Stout	Severn Sailing Association
1994	Rush Creek Yacht Club	Doug Hart	Jon Rogers	Mission Bay Yacht Club
1995	Richmond Yacht Club	Doug Hart	Steve Stewart	Mission Bay Yacht Club
1996	Pensacola Yacht Club	Peter Commette	Connie Commette	Lauderdale Yacht Club
1997	Toms River Yacht Club	George Szabo	Eric Wilcox	San Diego Yacht Club
1998	Gull Lake Country Club	George Szabo	Eric Wilcox	San Diego Yacht Club
1999	Mission Bay Yacht Club	George Szabo	Eric Wilcox	San Diego Yacht Club
2000	Oklahoma City Boat Club	George Szabo	Carol Cronin	San Diego Yacht Club
2001	Columbia Gorge Racing Association	Augie Diaz	Brian Janney	Coconut Grove Sailing Club
2002	Pass Christian Yacht Club	Augie Diaz	Pam Kelly	Coconut Grove Sailing Club
2003	Beverly Yacht Club	Andy Pimental	Kathleen Tocke	Sail Newport
2004	Mentor Harbor Yachting Club	Ernesto Rodriguez	Leandro Spina	Miami, Florida
2005	San Diego Yacht Club	George Szabo	Eric Wilcox	San Diego Yacht Club
2006	Erie Yacht Club	Augie Diaz	Mark Ivey	Coconut Grove Sailing Club
2007	Dillon Yacht Club	Ernesto Rodriguez	Megan Place	Miami, Florida
2008	Richmond Yacht Club	Augie Diaz	Kathleen Tocke	Coconut Grove Sailing Club
2009	Pensacola Yacht Club	Augie Diaz	Kathleen Tocke	Coconut Grove Sailing Club
2010	Severn Sailing Association	Augie Diaz	Kathleen Tocke	Coconut Grove Sailing Club
2011	North Cape Yacht Club	Augie Diaz	Kathleen Tocke	Coconut Grove Sailing Club
2012	Coral Reef Yacht Club	Ernesto Rodriguez	Cate Gundlach	Miami, Florida
2013	Buffalo Canoe Club	Raúl Ríos	Max Agnese	Club Náutico de San Juan
2014	Okoboji Yacht Club	Raúl Ríos	Henry Dumke	Club Náutico de San Juan
2015	Mission Bay Yacht Club	Raúl Ríos	Kara Voss	Club Náutico de San Juan
2016	Rush Creek Yacht Club	Ernesto Rodriguez	Alex Sidi	Miami, Florida
2017	Winchester Boat Club	Jim Bowers	Julia Marsh Rabin	Winchester Boat Club
2018	Green Lake Yacht Club	Augie Diaz	Julia Melton	Coral Reef Yacht Club
2019	Jubilee Yacht Club	Tomas Hornos	Kathleen Tocke	Boston Yacht Club
2021	Severn Sailing Association	Ernesto Rodriguez	Kathleen Tocke	Miami, Florida
2022	San Diego Yacht Club	Ernesto Rodriguez	Kathleen Tocke	Miami, Florida
2023	Sandusky Sailing Club	Ernesto Rodriguez	Christine De Silva	Miami, Florida
2024	Jubilee Yacht Club	Justin Callahan	Trevor Davis	Biscayne Bay Yacht Club
2025	Atlanta Yacht Club	Augie Diaz	Madeline Baldridge	Coral Reef Yacht Club
2026	Severn Sailing Association	Justin Callahan	Trevor Davis	Ida Lewis Yacht Club
