= Chautauqua Lake Yacht Club =

Coordinates: 42.1067°N 79.3234°W

- Burgee
- Short name: CLYC
- Founded: 1894
- Location: 43 E Lake Street, Lakewood, New York
- Website: www.sailclyc.org

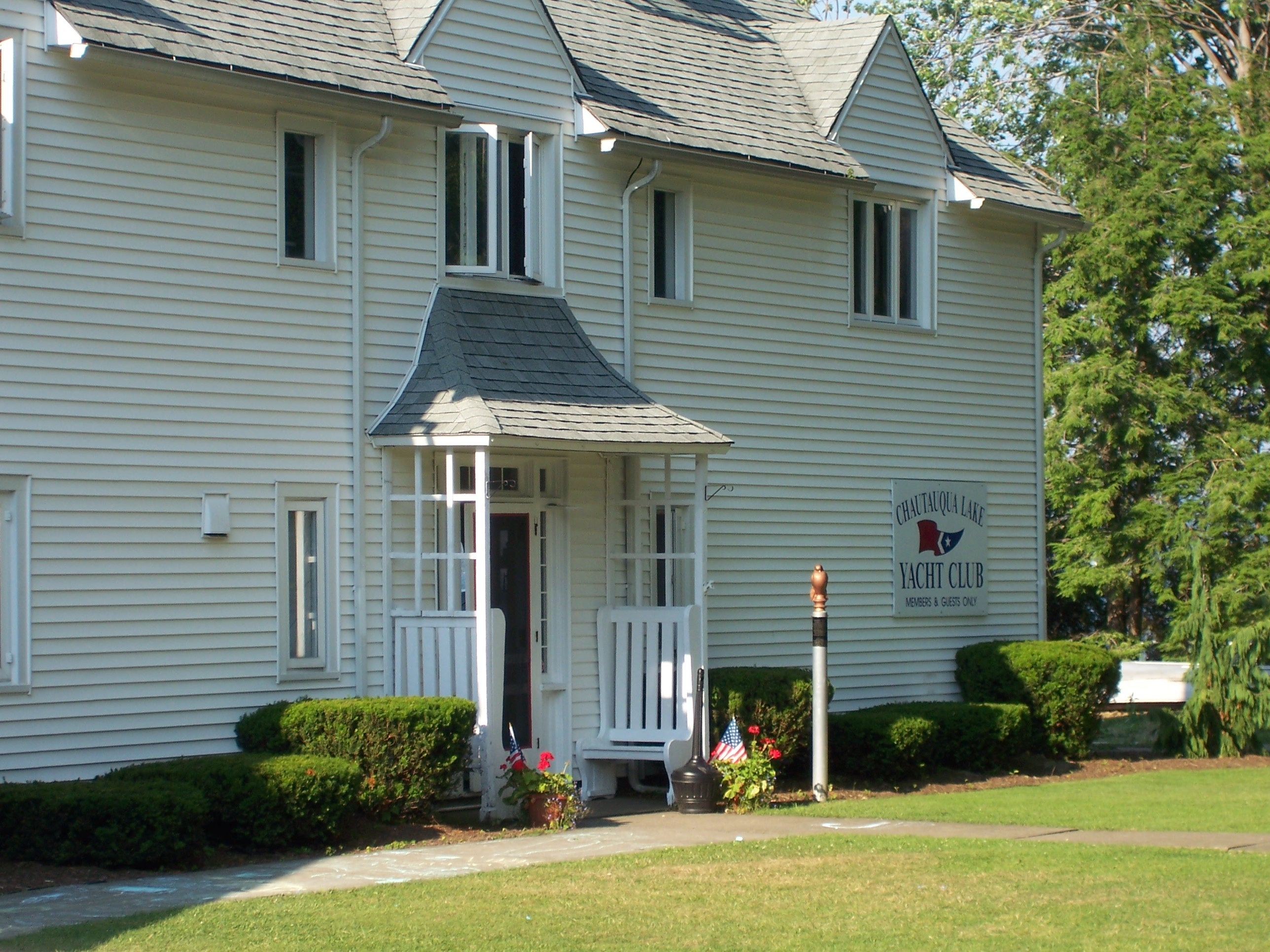
Clubhouse Entrance

The Chautauqua Lake Yacht Club (CLYC) is a private yacht club located in Lakewood, New York, on the south shore of Chautauqua Lake.

== Fleets ==
The club was a powerhouse of the Snipe International Class, and still holds number 124 in the listing of Snipe fleets around the world. In that class, CLYC hosted the world championship in 1946, the North Americans in 1979, and the Nationals in 1949, 1958 and 1966, while producing two SCIRA Commodores: Harold Griffith (1949) and Edward "Red" Garfield (1960).

CLYC is now home of the following fleets:

- E-Scow
- Laser
- Optimist

== Sailors ==
Leslie Larson won the 1959 Snipe Junior National Championship along with his crew, Jim Lenna, and the National Championship in 1962 with his father Victor Larson (who had been second himself in 1946).
