= Snipe North American Championship =

The Snipe North American Championship is the annual North American Championship for sailing in the Snipe class.

The regatta is open to Snipe Class International Racing Association (SCIRA) registered boats and class member skippers and crews, and the following trophies are awarded:

- Birney Mills Memorial Trophy to the winning Skipper from a qualified North American Country.
- Kim Thompson Memorial Trophy to the winning crew from a qualified North American Country.
- Chuck Loomis Trophy to the top Junior (Skipper or Crew will not have reached the age of 20 by December 31 of the year in which the event is sailed) team from a qualified North American Country. If no boat/team competes where both skipper and crew are junior sailors, the top placing junior skipper, or the top placing junior crew if no junior skipper racing.

It is held every year alternating venues around any country in North America. 3 races constitute a regatta.

2017 winners were Rodriguez and Kathleen Tocke.

== Winners ==
Year	Host	Skipper	Crew	Fleet
1973	(Canada) Oakville Yacht Squadron	Don Hite		(United States) Lake Angelus, Michigan
1974	(United States) U.S. Sailing Center at Association Island	Augie Diaz	Charlie Bustamante	(United States) Coconut Grove Sailing Club
1975	(United States) U.S. Sailing Center at Association Island	Gerald (Jerry) Dennis Thompson	Ron Moore	(United States) Alamitos Bay Yacht Club
1976	(The Bahamas) Royal Nassau Sailing Club	Bruce Colyer	Glenn Sutter	(United States) Ft. Lauderdale, Florida
1977	(United States) Mission Bay Yacht Club	Jeff Lenhart		(United States) Mission Bay Yacht Club
1978	(United States) Severn Sailing Association	Jeff Lenhart	Peggy Lenhart	(United States) Mission Bay Yacht Club
1979	(United States) Chautauqua Lake Yacht Club	Dave Chapin	G. Knapp	(United States) Island Bay Yacht Club
1980	(United States) North Cape Yacht Club	Mark Reynolds		(United States) San Diego Yacht Club
1981	(United States) Sea Cliff Yacht Club	Ed Adams	Meredith O'Dowd	(United States) Ida Lewis Yacht Club
1982	(United States) Mission Bay Yacht Club	Mark Reynolds	DeAnn Reynolds	(United States) San Diego Yacht Club
1983	(Canada) Oakville Yacht Squadron	Ed Adams	Meredith Adams	(United States) Ida Lewis Yacht Club
1984	(United States) Alamitos Bay Yacht Club	Keith Dodson	Claudia O'Brien	(United States) Alamitos Bay Yacht Club
1985	(United States) Severn Sailing Association	Ed Adams	Meredith Adams	(United States) Ida Lewis Yacht Club
1986	(United States) Richmond Yacht Club	Mike Segerblom	Ron Rosenberg	(United States) Alamitos Bay Yacht Club
1987	(United States) Eastern Yacht Club	Ed Adams	Meredith Adams	(United States) Ida Lewis Yacht Club
1988	(Canada) Oakville Harbour Yacht Club	Craig Leweck	Brad Rodi	(United States) Mission Bay Yacht Club
1989	(United States) Mission Bay Yacht Club	Craig Leweck	Lisa Manzer	(United States) Mission Bay Yacht Club
1990	(United States) Rush Creek Yacht Club	Jack Franco	Renee Vesterby	(United States) Balboa Yacht Club
1991	(United States) Newport Harbor Yacht Club	Mark Reynolds	Deann Reynolds	(United States) San Diego Yacht Club
1992	(United States) Crescent Sail Yacht Club	Peter Commette	Connie Suddath	(United States) Lauderdale Yacht Club
1993	(Canada) Bronte Harbour Yacht Club	Ed Adams	Carol Newman	(United States) Ida Lewis Yacht Club
1994	(United States) Severn Sailing Association	Brian Fishback	Lorie Stout	(United States) Severn Sailing Association
1995	(United States) Lake Lanier Sailing Club	Willie Graves	Carrie Warren	(United States) Mission Bay, California
1996	(The Bahamas) Royal Nassau Sailing Club	Doug Hart	Watt Duffy	(United States) Mission Bay Yacht Club
1997^	(Canada) Oakville Yacht Squadron			
1998	(United States) Carlyle Sailing Association	George Szabo	Jeff Baker	(United States) San Diego Yacht Club
1999	(United States) Cottage Park Yacht Club	George Szabo	Carol Cronin	(United States) San Diego Yacht Club
2000	(Bermuda) Spanish Point Boat Club	George Szabo	Carol Cronin	(United States) San Diego Yacht Club
2001^^	(The Bahamas) Royal Nassau Sailing Club	Alexandre Paradeda	Eduardo Paradeda	(Brazil) Clube dos Jangadeiros
2002	(United States) Carlyle Sailing Association	Rob Hallawell	Bridget Hallawell	(United States) Pleon Yacht Club
2003	(United States) Willamette Sailing Club	George Szabo	Shelly Suarez	(United States) San Diego Yacht Club
2004	(United States) Florida Yacht Club	Augie Diaz	Lisa Griffith	(United States) Coconut Grove Sailing Club
2005	(Canada) Oakville Yacht Squadron	Mike Blackwood	Patty Mueller	(United States) South Shore Yacht Club
2006	(United States) Gull Lake Yacht Club	Augie Diaz	Pamela Kelly	(United States) Coconut Grove Sailing Club
2007	(Bermuda) Spanish Point Boat Club	Augie Diaz	Kathleen Tocke	(United States) Coconut Grove Sailing Club
2008	(United States) Cottage Park Yacht Club	Augie Diaz	Kathleen Tocke	(United States) Coconut Grove Sailing Club
2009	(United States) Erie Yacht Club	Ernesto Rodriguez	Megan Place	(United States) Miami
2010	(Puerto Rico) Ponce Yacht and Fishing Club	Jorge Xavier Murrieta	Alejandro Murrieta	(Mexico) Club Náutico Avándaro
2011	(United States) Mission Bay Yacht Club	Raúl Ríos	Marco Teixidor	(Puerto Rico) Club Náutico de San Juan
2012	(Canada) Etobicoke Yacht Club	Raúl Ríos	Édgar Diminich	(Puerto Rico) Club Náutico de San Juan
2013	(United States) Lakewood Yacht Club	Augie Diaz	Kathleen Tocke	(United States) Coral Reef Yacht Club
2014	(United States) Cottage Park Yacht Club	Ernesto Rodriguez	Ed Mintzias	(United States) Miami
2015	(Canada) Royal Hamilton Yacht Club	Raúl Ríos	Fernando Monllor	(Puerto Rico) Club Náutico de San Juan
2016	(United States) Severn Sailing Association	Doug Hart	Ryan Hopps	(United States) Mission Bay Yacht Club
2017	(United States) Lauderdale Yacht Club	Ernesto Rodriguez	Kathleen Tocke	(United States) Miami
2018	(United States) San Diego Yacht Club	Ernesto Rodriguez	Kathleen Tocke	(United States) Miami
2019	(United States) San Diego Yacht Club	Enrique Quintero	Kathleen Tocke	(United States) Coral Reef Yacht Club
2021	(United States) Jubilee Yacht Club	Ernesto Rodriguez	Kathleen Tocke	(United States) Miami
2022	(Canada) Etobicoke Yacht Club	Raúl Ríos	Andrea Riefkohl	(Puerto Rico) Club Náutico de San Juan
2023	(United States) Norfolk Yacht and Country Club	Arthur Blodgett	Grace Howie	(United States) Severn Sailing Association
2024	(United States) Mantoloking Yacht Club/Bay Head Yacht Club	Ernesto Rodriguez	Taylor Scheuermann	(United States) Miami
2025	(United States) San Diego Yacht Club	Ernesto Rodriguez	Marina Cano	(United States) Miami
2026	(United States) Sail Newport	Justin Callahan	Trevor Davis	(United States) Ida Lewis Yacht Club

- ^In 1997, due to wind conditions, only 2 races were completed and the regatta was not valid.
- ^^In 2001, Birney Mills Memorial Trophy and Kim Thompson Memorial Trophy went to Bill Hardesty and Jon Rogers (USA), as regatta winners were not from a qualified North American Country.
