= Masters Snipe World Championship =

The Masters Snipe World Championship is an annual international sailing regatta for Snipe (dinghy), organized by the host club on behalf of the Internal Snipe Class Association and recognized by World Sailing, the sports IOC recognized governing body. The trophy awarded for the World Championship is Commodore Hub E. Isaacks and O'Leary Trophies. The class got recognised status by World Sailing in 1958.

== Trophies ==
Id Crook Memorial Trophy is the sailing trophy awarded at the. The Id Crook Memorial Trophy is awarded to the winning skipper and crew. Canada donated it to the Snipe Class International Racing Association (SCIRA). It's named after Canadian Id Crook, SCIRA's commodore, in 2000.

The regatta venue rotates among North America, Europe, South America and Japan. No races to be run in wind velocity exceeding 15 knots.

The helm must be at least 45 years of age in the year of the regatta. The combined age of the skipper and crew must be at least 80 years in the year of the regatta.

As well as the main title there are four sub divisions awarded prizes for helms with the following ages:

- Apprentice Master Division (45-54 years)
- Master Division (55-64 years)
- Grand Master Division (65-74 years)
- Master Legends Division (75 years old and onwards)

The Master Legends Division was created in 2015

== Events ==
Edition			Hosts			Sailor			Boats				Ref.
No	Day/Month	Year	Host club	City	Country	No.	Nat.	Cont.	Boats			Mix	Ref.
1	21-25 Oct	1986	Atlanta Yacht Club	Acworth	United States								
2		1987	Yacht Club Santo Amaro	São Paulo	Brazil								
3	-	1988	Oakville Harbour Yacht Club	Oakville	Canada								
4	-	1991	Real Club de Regatas de Santiago de la Ribera	Santiago de la Ribera	Spain								
5	-	1992	Clube Internacional da Marina de Vilamoura	Vilamoura	Portugal								
6	27-31 Jul	1994	Kaiyo Yacht Harbor	Gamagori	Japan								
7	-	1996	Vestfjordens Seilforening	Oslo	Norway								
8	-	1998	Club Náutico Córdoba	Villa Carlos Paz	Argentina	56	9	4	28	21	0	7	
9	-	2000	Horsens Sejlklub	Horsens	Denmark	126	14	4	63	46	0	17	
10	-	2002	St. Petersburg Yacht Club	St. Petersburg	United States								
11	2-7 Aug	2004	Associazione Sportiva dilettantistica Nautica Sabazia	Lake Bracciano	Italy	166	16	4	83	44	2	37	
12	3-7 Oct	2006	Royal Nassau Sailing Club	Nassau	Bahamas	70	9	3	35	16	2	17	
N/A	-	2008		Malmo	Sweden	INSUFFICIENT ENTRIES EVENT CANCELLED							
14	-	2009	Società Triestina della Vela & Yacht Club Adriaco	Trieste	Italy	132	14	4	66				
13	19-26 Sep	2010	Iate Clube do Rio de Janeiro	Rio de Janeiro	Brazil	106	7	4	53	38	0	15	
14	10-16 Sep	2012	Real Club de Regatas de Santiago de la Ribera	Santiago de la Ribera	Spain	154	14	4	77	54	0	23	
15	25-31 Aug	2014	Fukuoka City Yacht Harbor	Fukuoka	Japan	72	9	4	36	33	0	3	
16	-	2016	Royal Nassau Sailing Club	Nassau	Bahamas	70	10	5	35	19	1	15	
17	24-30 Jun	2018	Associação Naval de Lisboa	Vilamoura	Spain	154	15	4	77	50	1	26	
N/A		2020	St. Petersburg Yacht Club	St. Petersburg	United States	CANCELLED DUE TO COVID							
N/A	8-15 Aug	2021	St. Petersburg Yacht Club	St. Petersburg	United States	CANCELLED DUE TO COVID							
18	16-22 Oct	2023	Club Náutico Puerto Sherry	El Puerto de Santa María	Spain	222	16	4	111	70	1	40	
19	9-13 Dec	2025	Cofradía Náutica de Frutillar	Frutillar	Chile	108	9	3	54				

== Winners ==
Year	Skipper & Crew	Country
1986	Ken Simons & Bill Simons	United States
1987	Ivan Pimentel & Ricardo Lebreiro	Brazil
1989	Ivan Pimentel & Luis Pesnovich	Brazil
1991	Félix Gancedo & Carlos Llamas	Spain
1992	Paulo da Silva Santos & Fernando Silva	Brazil
1994	Kazunori Shinka & Tetsuji Nakatani	Japan
1996	Birger Jansen & Marianne Stigar	Norway
1998	Bibi Juetz & Felipe Vasconcellos	Brazil
1999	Flemming Christiansen & Morten Ullmann	Denmark
2002	Augie Diaz & John Kehoe	United States
2004	Augie Diaz & Lisa Griffith	United States
2006	Augie Diaz & Pam Kelly	United States
2008 (1)	EVENT CANCELLED	
2009 (2)	NO TITLE AWARDED	
2010	Paulo da Silva Santos & Rodrigo Inacio	Brazil
2012	Augie Diaz & Justine O’Connor	United States
2014	Takeyasu Sugiyama & Hirotaka Kaneda	Japan
2016	Ernesto Rodriguez & Kathleen Tocke	United States
2018	Damián Borrás & Jordi Triay	Spain
2020/21 (3)	CANCELLED COVID	
2023	Damián Borrás & Sara Franceschi	Spain
2025	Ernesto Rodríguez & Taylor Scheuermann	United States

1) The 2008 Masters Worlds was scheduled as part of the multi sports European Master Games in Sweden but there were insufficient entries 2) to replace the 2008 event a masters was scheduled in 2009 but due to both to much and to little wind, only one race completed with at least three races required to be award the Championship title.
3) The 2020 championship was cancelled due to the COVID-19 pandemic
