= Clearwater Yacht Club =

Boating group in Florida

- Burgee
- Short name: CYC
- Founded: February 14, 1911; 114 years ago
- Location: 830 Bayway Blvd., Clearwater, Florida 33767 United States
- Website: clearwateryachtclub.org

Clearwater Yacht Club is a yacht club located in Clearwater, Florida (United States). The club belongs to the Florida Council of Yacht Clubs, and the Florida Sailing Association.

== History ==
The club's charter and by-laws were officially registered on 14 February 1911.

Snipe fleet number 46, based at the club, was very strong in the 1930s and first hosted the Midwinter Snipe Championship Regatta in 1935, and has been raced ever since with the exception of the war years.

Clark Mills was also the builder of Snipe "Honey", winner of the United States Snipe National Championship in 1951 with Francis Seavy and Howard McGaughey.

CYC hosted the 1960 United States Snipe National Championship.
