= Entdecker- und Seefahrerfördervereinigung =

- Burgee
- Short name: EnSFr
- Founded: 1982
- Location: Hamburg
- Chairman: Klaus Stammerjohann
- Website: ensfr.de

The Entdecker- und Seefahrerfördervereinigung (EnSFr; approx. meaning Explorers' and Seafarers' Promotion Association) is a sailing club from Hamburg.

== Club history ==
The EnSFr has been founded in 1982 and had around 30 members in 2016.

== German Sailing League ==
From 2015 to 2017 and from 2021 the EnSFr took part in the Second German Sailing League. Finishing with a fourth place overall in the Second German Sailing League in 2025, the club qualified for the First German Sailing League from the 2026 season.
