= Recognized class =

The designation Recognized Class may be granted by the International Sailing Federation (ISAF) to classes of sailboats that offer a high standard of international competitive sailing and satisfy a number of criteria regarding the number of boats of that class, their international distribution, and the rules, administration and operation of that class's Class Association.

The designation International Class may be granted to a class of sail boat that is more widely distributed and numerous than a Recognized Class.
