= Southwestern Yacht Club =

Southwestern Yacht Club may refer to the following yacht clubs in the United States:

- Southwestern Yacht Club (California), in La Playa, San Diego, California
- Southwestern Yacht Club (Texas), merged with Corpus Christi Yacht Club, in Corpus Christi, Texas
