= Indianapolis Sailing Club =

Private yacht club in Indiana, US

- Burgee
- Short name: ISC
- Founded: 1955
- Location: 11325 Fall Creek Rd., Indianapolis, Indiana 46256
- Website: indianapolissailing.org

The Indianapolis Sailing Club is a private yacht club located in Indianapolis, Indiana, on the shore of Geist Reservoir (US).

== History ==
In November 1954, a group of sailors gathered to discuss the possibility of organizing a sailing club on the Geist Reservoir, created by the Indianapolis Water Company in 1943. The group met regularly during the next months to formulate a constitution, by-laws, a set of strict safety rules, and legal documents to lease land from the Indianapolis Water Company for a clubhouse site and docking facilities. On February 24, 1955, a 10-year lease with the Indianapolis Sailing Association granting the use of around 13 acres of land and sailing privileges on Geist Reservoir was signed. On June 19, 1955, a grand opening was held on the present clubhouse grounds. The original classes of sailboats at ISC were Snipes, Lightnings, Thistles and Y flyers. On March 11, 1957, at the annual meeting, ISC members voted to change the name to Indianapolis Sailing Club.

== Fleets ==
The ISC is home of the following One-Design racing fleets:

- MC Scow Fleet #103
- Sunfish Fleet
- Laser Fleet #24
- Snipe Fleet #409
- Melges 17 Fleet #9
- Thistles Fleet #69
- Y flyer Fleet #8
- Interlake Fleet #28
- Lightning Fleet #270
- Ice boat Fleet
- Portsmouth Fleet
