= Winchester Boat Club =

- Burgee
- Founded: 1900
- Location: 65 Cambridge Street, Winchester, Massachusetts 01890
- Website: www.winchesterboatclub.org

The Winchester Boat Club is a private Sailing and swimming club located in Winchester, Massachusetts, on the shore of Upper Mystic Lake.

== History ==
The club was founded in 1900 as a canoe club, adding sailing and swimming later on.

== Fleets ==
One-Design racing fleets include N-10, Optimist, 420 and Snipe.

The Snipe fleet (number 77) has over 20 units, and organizes the Winchester Invitational Trophy every year. In 2016, the Snipe Class International Racing Association USA Board of Directors accepted a bid from the Winchester Boat Club to host the 2017 United States Snipe National Championship, the 2017 US Snipe Jr. National Championship, and the 2017 US Snipe Special Junior National Championship.
