= Green Lake Yacht Club =

Private yacht club in Wisconsin, USA

- Burgee
- Short name: GLYC
- Founded: 1894
- Location: Green Lake, Wisconsin
- Website: www.greenlakeyachtclub.org

The Green Lake Yacht Club is a private yacht club located in Green Lake, Wisconsin, United States. It's one of the members of the Inland Lake Yachting Association (ILYA).

== History ==
The Green Lake Yacht Club, organized in 1894, was one of the first yacht clubs in the state.

== Fleets ==
At the present time the club is home of the following One-Design racing fleets:

- E-Scow Fleet
- Laser Fleet
- Snipe Fleet #129
- Optimist Fleet

== Regattas ==
GLYC hosted the 10th Annual A-Scow National Championship in 2015, and the ILYA I-20 Invitational Regatta in 2009 and 2015.
