= Wawasee Yacht Club =

- Burgee
- Founded: 1935
- Location: 6338 E Trusdell Ave. Syracuse, Indiana
- Website: sites.google.com/site/wawaseeyachtclub/

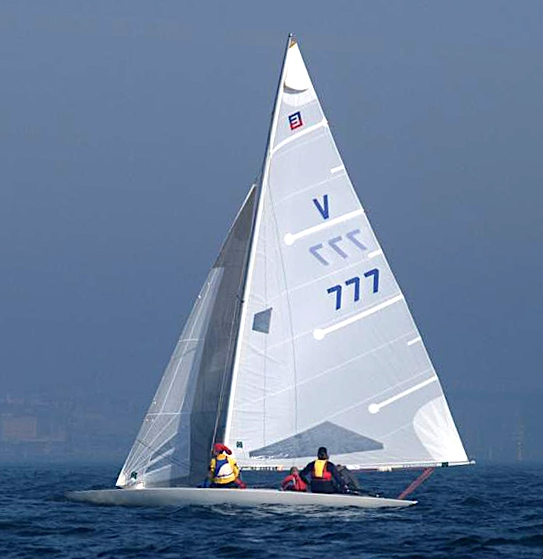
An E-Scow

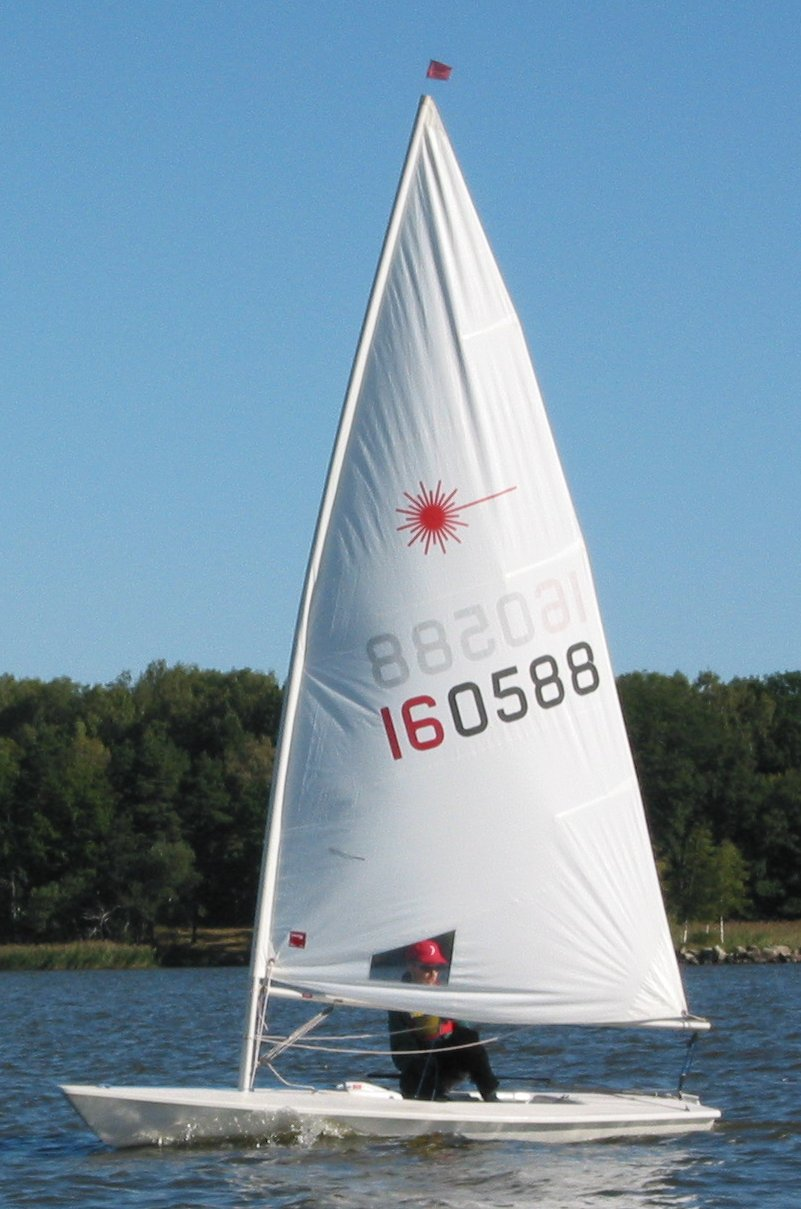
A Laser

The Wawasee Yacht Club was formed in 1935 and is located at 6338 E Trusdell Ave. on the northeast shore of Lake Wawasee, Indiana. It currently has 75 families and 35 social members sailing 28-foot E-Scow, 19-foot Lightning, and 13-foot Sunfish class boats in three regattas held from June through early October.

== History ==
The Wawasee Yacht Club has a strong sailing tradition that began over 70 years ago and continues today. The flagpole and adjacent plaque near the Wawasee Yacht Club clubhouse was dedicated in 1972 to commemorate the memory and the efforts of Joseph Plasket as one of the founders and as one of the former commodores of the club. Joe Plasket, Ed Dodez, Byron McCammon and Henry Wahl came to Lake Wawasee in 1935 to see if it would be a good location to sail, and perhaps race, their boats. Bishop's Boat Livery and Marine Supply, which was located on the northeast corner of the lake near the Eli Lilly property, gave the men permission to use a porch as a meeting place and base of operations as they started racing their handcrafted Snipe sailboats. They were soon joined by a group of local sailors, creating SCIRA's Snipe fleet number 40. Some of them (the Levinson and Call families) are still part of the club today. With membership increasing, and with the financial support of Eli Lilly, the porch was enclosed for meetings. After being in existence less than 4 years the Wawasee Yacht Club emerged as a worthy host of the 1938 Snipe World Championship.

In the following year, 1939, the club was incorporated as a legal entity and, with the continued assistance of Eli Lilly, purchased the current land and original clubhouse on Trusdell Avenue. The nearby Tavern Hotel gave the club a 10' easement so boats could be taken down to the lake and launched for racing.

The war years of the early 1940s naturally limited the club's activities. However, the club rebounded quickly as members were discharged from military duty and it once again became the focus of sailboat racing on Lake Wawasee. Snipe were raced into the early 1950s; but the Lightning fleet grew quickly in the late 1940s. By the mid-1950s, the WYC raced only the classic Stephens and Sparkman-designed Lightning.

Eli Lilly, who had founded the earlier Wawasee Yacht and Canoe Club in the 1890s and had traditionally sailed boats named "Cynthia", bequeathed the sterling silver Cynthia's Cup to the WYC in 1949. The bequest stated that the cup was to be given annually to the season's highest ranked skipper. Today the tradition continues with the trophy being shared by the top skippers in single-handed and multi-crewed fleets.

In the early 1950s, the Tavern Hotel burned to the ground and was replaced by two lake homes. Along with its existing boat launching area, the club was able to gain additional lake frontage that gave the club the boat yard it has today.

In 1954, the club hosted its 1st Hoosier Regatta for Lightnings—a regatta that has run continually and celebrated its 50th anniversary in early October 2004. This fall classic is the traditional closing event of the WYC's racing season

For many years, the Lightning fleet was the mainstay of the Wawasee Yacht Club, but by the early 1990s the local Wawasee Boating Association had developed a growing fleet of E-Scow. The merger of the two groups re-invigorated the WYC and led the way for more growth. The annual E-Scow regatta in early June has become one of the best-attended E-Scow regattas in the region.

In the early 1980s, a Laser fleet was started at the club. For lady sailors, the "Wawashe's" started a series of races and training in Sunfish in mid-1990s. From that start, a full racing fleet developed and the Lake Wawasee Sunfish Regatta in August of each season has quickly developed into one of the premier events on the Sunfish Midwest circuit. In September 2007 the Wawasee Yacht Club hosted the 2007 Women's Sunfish North American Championship

== General information ==
Today the club currently has 3 active racing fleets: Lightning, E-Scow and Sunfish. On a typical Saturday morning 15–20 sailboats participate in competitions on the lake, and on Sundays 8–10 E-Scows and an equal number of Lightnings also compete. In July, the club holds a Junior Sailing program, for the purpose of introducing youth members to the sport of sailboat racing.

With a racing membership of 75 families and 35 social members, the club sponsors an active social schedule for families and adults. In 2001–2002, the WYC embarked on an extensive remodeling and expansion of the 1920s clubhouse under the guidance of architect and long-time member John Call and with the full financial support of the club membership.
