= Chippewa Yacht Club =

Private yacht club in Ohio, United States

- Burgee
- Short name: CYC
- Founded: 1939
- Location: Chippewa Lake, Ohio
- Website: www.chippewasailing.org

The Chippewa Yacht Club is a private yacht club located in Chippewa Lake, Ohio (United States).

== Fleets ==
At the present time the club is home of two One-Design racing fleets:

- Y flyer Fleet #4
- Snipe Fleet #621
