= Onondaga Yacht Club =

- Burgee
- Founded: 1883
- Location: 100 Sycamore St., Liverpool, New York
- Website: www.oyccny.org

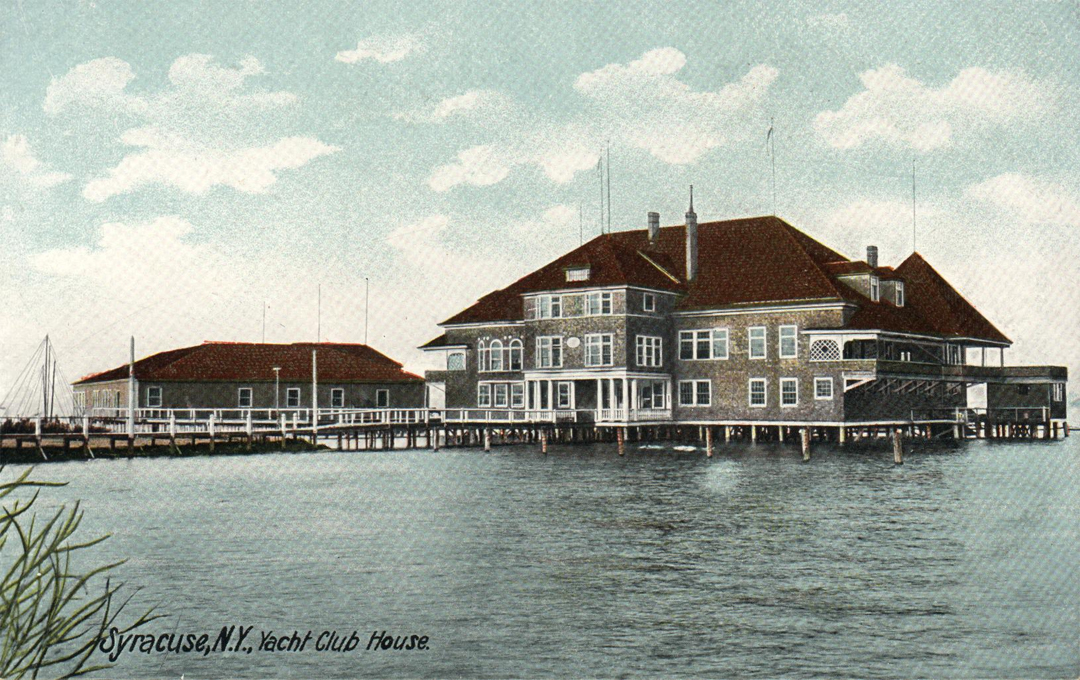
Onondaga Yacht Club clubhouse (1910)

The Onondaga Yacht Club is a private yacht club located in Liverpool, New York, on the shore of Onondaga Lake.

In 1953, the club was used by the Syracuse U. Sailing team for college competition.

== Fleets ==
The club is home of Snipe fleet number 18, Lightning fleet number 10, and a Laser fleet.
