= List of Snipe fleets =

The following is a partial list of Snipe fleets. Fleets are the basic organizational structure of the Snipe class, a 2-person, one design racing dinghy governed by the Snipe Class International Racing Association (SCIRA), and recognized by the World Sailing as an International Class. The Association consists of sailors organized into Fleets.

The first fleet outside the United States was chartered to the fleet of the Royal Cinque Ports Yacht Club, with fleet number 8. In July 1936, the Class became the world’s largest racing class, and as of May 2019, 904 chartered fleet numbers have been issued. Part of those fleets have gone inactive over the years.

== List of fleets ==
Fleet number	Fleet	Country
233	Club Náutico Sudeste	Argentina
274	Club Náutico San Isidro	Argentina
275	Yacht Club San Isidro	Argentina
289	Yacht Club Entrerriano	Argentina
290	Cruz del Sur (Yate Club Monte Hermoso, Club Náutico Bahía Blanca)	Argentina
374	Yacht Club Olivos	Argentina
451	Lago San Roque (Club Náutico Córdoba)	Argentina
466	Chascomús (Club de Regatas Chascomús)	Argentina
593	San Nicolás (Club de Regatas San Nicolás)	Argentina
629	Rosario (Club de Velas de Rosario, Yacht Club Rosario)	Argentina
721	Yacht Club Argentino	Argentina
731	Sanfa Fe (Club Marinas Puerto Santa Fe, Yacht Club Santa Fe)	Argentina
737	Club Universitario de Buenos Aires	Argentina
744	Club Náutico Olivos	Argentina
758	General San Martin	Argentina
853	Salta (Club de Regatas Güemes)	Argentina
897	Habsburg (Segelclub Mattsee)	Austria
391	Nassau (Royal Nassau Sailing Club)	Bahamas
212	Ostende (Royal North Sea Yacht Club Oostende	Belgium
356	Koninklijke Yacht Club Nieuwpoort	Belgium
423	Anversoise-Antwerp (Sociéte Royale Nautique Anversoise, Koninklijke Liberty Yacht Club, Royal Yacht Club van België )	Belgium
429	Royal Belgian Sailing Club	Belgium
361	Spanish Point Boat Club	Bermuda
159	Rio de Janeiro (Iate Clube do Rio de Janeiro)	Brazil
245	Vitória (Iate Clube do Espírito Santo )	Brazil
311	São Paulo (Yacht Club Paulista)	Brazil
368	Baia de Guanabara (Clube de Regatas Guanabara)	Brazil
414	Aracaju (Iate Clube de Aracaju)	Brazil
426	Rio Grande do Sul (Clube dos Jangadeiros, Veleiros do Sul)	Brazil
427	Cristal (Veleiros do Sul)	Brazil
434	Santo Amaro	Brazil
448	Guarapiranga	Brazil
450	Antonina (Iate Clube de Guaratuba)	Brazil
455	Macae (Grêmio de Vela Ilhabela)	Brazil
477	Saco de São Francisco (Rio Yacht Club, Clube Naval Charitas)	Brazil
483	Santos (Clube Internacional de Regatas)	Brazil
487	Salgadinho (Iate Clube Pajussara)	Brazil
516	Brasília (Iate Clube de Brasília)	Brazil
555	Florianópolis (Iate Clube de Santa Catarina)	Brazil
662	Bahia (Yacht Clube da Bahía)	Brazil
727	Iate Clube Veleiros da Lagoa	Brazil
878	Búzios (Búzios Vela Clube)	Brazil
95	Armdale Yacht Club	Canada
113	Bras d'Or Yacht Club	Canada
220	Northern Yacht Club	Canada
321	Oakville Yacht Squadron	Canada
408	Royal Victoria Yacht Club	Canada
622	Royal Hamilton Yacht Club	Canada
877	Guelph Community Boating Club	Canada
644	Yacht Club de Chile	Chile
645	Algarrobo	Chile
664	Papudo	Chile
670	Club Náutico Muña	Colombia
733	Club Náutico El Portillo	Colombia
898	Santander	Colombia
904	Nicoya	Costa Rica
456	Rijeka	Croatia
504	Split	Croatia
880	Kvarner	Croatia
22	La Habana	Cuba
302	Espergaerde (Espergærde Sejlklub)	Denmark
585	Copenhagen (Skovshoved Sejlklub)	Denmark
587	Kolding (Kolding Sejlklub)	Denmark
638	Hellerup (Hellerup Sejlklub)	Denmark
643	Middelfart (Middelfart Sejlklub)	Denmark
650	Horsens (Horsens Sejlklub)	Denmark
735	Lago San Pablo	Ecuador
886	Ecuador (Salinas Yacht Club, Manta Yacht Club)	Ecuador
481	Helsinki (Helsingfors Segelsällskap, Helsingfors Segelklubb, Nyländska Jaktklubben)	Finland
494	Kotka (Kotkan Pursiseura)	Finland
509	Turku (Turun Pursiseura)	Finland
523	Pori (Segelföreningen i Björneborg)	Finland
550	Tampere (Näsijärven Purjehdusseura)	Finland
552	Hamina (Haminan Pursiseura)	Finland
569	Lappeenranta (Lappeenrannan Pursiseura)	Finland
570	Kokkola (Gamlakarleby Segelförening)	Finland
576	Emäsalo (Borgå Segelsällskap)	Finland
578	Hanko (Hangö Udds Segelsällskap)	Finland
663	Nykarleby (Segelsällskapet Ägir)	Finland
741	Oulu	Finland
221	Paris	France
293	Claouey	France
294	Audierne	France
313	Le Havre	France
348	Lorient	France
778	Cercle de la Voile de Cazaux-Lac	France
846	Chiosy le Roi-Paris	France
849	Seglerverein Wörthsee	Germany
902	Amatitlán	Guatemala
738	Bangalore Sailing Club	India
48	Rimini (Club Nautico Rimini)	Italy
264	Monfalcone (Società Vela “Oscar Cosulich”)	Italy
335	Grignano (Società Velica di Barcola e Grignano)	Italy
395	Caldaro (Lega Navale Italiana - Bolzano)	Italy
399	El Gato	Italy
402	Romagna (Circolo Nautico Cervia)	Italy
415	Punta Indiani (Associazione Velica Trentina, Circolo Nautico Chioggia)	Italy
541	Ledro (Associazione Vela Lago Ledro)	Italy
606	Sistiana (Società Velica di Barcola e Grignano, Società Triestina della Vela, Circolo della Vela Muggia, Yacht Club Lignano, Società Nautica Pietas Julia)	Italy
609	Cremona (Circolo Vela Cremona)	Italy
616	Orta1 (Circolo Vela Orta)	Italy
617	Capo Verde (Yacht Club Sanremo)	Italy
833	Orbetello (Circolo Nautico Castiglioncello)	Italy
837	Macondo (Associazione Velica di Bracciano)	Italy
838	Ledro (Associazione Vela Lago di Ledro)	Italy
847	Laguna (Circolo Nautico Chioggia)	Italy
850	Est Nord Est	Italy
856	Edonista (Circolo Vela Gargnano)	Italy
868	Planet Sail Bracciano	Italy
875	Aternum (Lega Navale Italiana - Pescara)	Italy
888	Yacht Club Adriaco	Italy
895	Ceresium (Circolo Velico Ceresio)	Italy
428	Kanto	Japan
519	Chubu	Japan
561	Biwako	Japan
595	Kyushu	Japan
692	Chugoku	Japan
820	Hokkaido	Japan
703	Kansai	Japan
821	Tohuku	Japan
822	Hokuriku	Japan
823	Shikoku	Japan
839	Enoshims Snipe Kenkyukai	Japan
844	Ushimado Snipe Gakkyu	Japan
884	Kagoshima	Japan
879	Club Náutico Avándaro	Mexico
194	Oslo (Bundefjorden Seilforening, Kongelig Norsk Seilforening, Oslo Seilforening, Skøyen Seilforening	Norway
195	Bærum Seilforening	Norway
675	Bergen (Bergens Seilforening, Hjellestad Seilforening, Milde Båtlag)	Norway
815	Asker Seilforening	Norway
816	Åsgårdstrand Seilforening	Norway
829	Stavanger Seilforening	Norway
854	Tønsberg Seilforening	Norway
863	Risør Seilforening	Norway
896	Kristiansunds Seilforening	Norway
899	Horten Seilforening	Norway
	Moss Seilforening	Norway
	Røyken Seilforening	Norway
749	Yacht Club Ypacarai	Paraguay
861	Club Náutico San Bernardino	Paraguay
357	Lima (Yacht Club Ancón, Club de Regatas Lima)	Peru
855	Slonka	Poland
188	Clube Naval de Lisboa	Portugal
331	Sport Club do Porto	Portugal
332	Clube Naval de Cascais	Portugal
334	Clube Naval Setubalense	Portugal
358	Faro (Ginásio Clube Naval)	Portugal
369	Clube de Vela Atlântico	Portugal
458	Lagos (Clube de Vela de Lagos)	Portugal
702	Portimão (Clube Naval Portimão, Iate Clube Marina de Portimão)	Portugal
791	Clube Náutico de Oficiais e Cadetes da Armada	Portugal
796	Clube Internacional da Marina de Vilamoura	Portugal
826	Clube Naval de Leça	Portugal
827	Clube Náutico de Almada	Portugal
870	Yate Clube do Porto	Portugal
591	Club Náutico de San Juan	Puerto Rico
832	Москва	Russia
667	Transvaal Yacht Club	South Africa
136	Real Club Náutico de Vigo	Spain
146	Real Club Mediterráneo	Spain
147	Real Club de Regatas de Cartagena	Spain
148	Real Club de Regatas de Santiago de la Ribera	Spain
150	Real Club Marítimo de Santander	Spain
151	Real Club Marítimo del Abra & Real Sporting Club	Spain
152	Real Club Astur de Regatas	Spain
153	Escuela Naval Militar	Spain
154	Real Club Náutico de Valencia	Spain
168	Real Club Náutico de La Coruña	Spain
187	Club Marítimo de Mahón	Spain
214	Real Club de Regatas de Galicia	Spain
248	Real Club Náutico de Palma	Spain
249	Club Náutico de Ibiza	Spain
252	Club Náutico de Ciudadela	Spain
278	Club de Mar de Almeria	Spain
281	Liceo Casino de Vilagarcía de Arousa	Spain
287	Real Club Náutico de Gran Canaria	Spain
529	Real Club Náutico de Madrid	Spain
623	Real Club Náutico de Arrecife	Spain
624	Club Náutico de Motril	Spain
649	Club de Mar - Mallorca	Spain
678	Real Club Náutico de Torrevieja	Spain
685	Club Marítimo Molinar de Levante	Spain
686	Club Náutico Los Nietos	Spain
773	Club Marítimo de Canido	Spain
776	Real Club Náutico de Adra	Spain
866	Cádiz	Spain
873	Club Náutico Cala Gamba	Spain
324	Skåne	Sweden
325	Landskrona Segelsällskap	Sweden
327	Göteborg (Hovås Yacht Club)	Sweden
329	Stockholm	Sweden
512	Stavsnäs	Sweden
522	Karlshamns Segelsällskap	Sweden
825	Lake Vattern (Motala Segelsällskap)	Sweden
883	Westervik	Sweden
901	Lake Lugano (Club Nautico Morcote)	Switzerland
581	Naval Academy	Turkey
13	Northern Ireland (Strangford Lough Yacht Club, Lough Erne Yacht Club)	United Kingdom
217	Budworth Sailing Club	United Kingdom
362	Maldon Yacht Club	United Kingdom
372	Stone Sailing Club	United Kingdom
388	Broadstairs Sailing Club	United Kingdom
545	Bough Beech Sailing Club	United Kingdom
563	Erith Yacht Club	United Kingdom
1	Dallas (Corinthian Sailing Club, Dallas Corinthian Yacht Club, White Rock Sailing Club)	United States
5	Detroit River (Crescent Sail Yacht Club)	United States
7	Miami (Coral Reef Yacht Club, Biscayne Bay Yacht Club, Key Biscayne Yacht Club, Miami Yacht Club)	United States
10	Lake Mohawk Yacht Club	United States
12	San Francisco Bay (Richmond Yacht Club)	United States
14	Oklahoma City Boat Club	United States
17	Narragansett Bay	United States
18	Onondaga Yacht Club	United States
24	Santa Monica (South Coast Corinthian Yacht Club)	United States
28	Edgewood Yacht Club	United States
52	Charleston	United States
68	Sequoyah Yacht Club	United States
77	Winchester (Winchester Boat Club)	United States
91	Island Bay Yacht Club	United States
93	Wichita (Ninnescah Sailing Association, Walnut Valley Sailing Club)	United States
96	Davis Island Yacht Club	United States
103	Newport Yacht Club, Rochester	United States
110	Portage Lakes Yacht Club	United States
128	Milwaukee (South Shore Yacht Club)	United States
129	Green Lake Yacht Club	United States
137	Grand Rapids Yacht Club	United States
142	Privateer Yacht Club	United States
190	Gull Lake	United States
196	Coconut Grove Sailing Club	United States
210	Rocky Mountain (Union Sailing Club)	United States
218	Alamitos Bay	United States
231	Quassapaug (Quassapaug Sailing Center)	United States
244	Cottage Park Yacht Club	United States
256	Barnegat Bay (Surf City Yacht Club)	United States
258	Manhasset Bay	United States
301	Bantam Lake	United States
309	Iowa/Nebraska (Lake Manawa Sailing Association)	United States
330	Atlanta Yacht Club	United States
409	Indianapolis Sailing Club	United States
412	Galway Lake	United States
433	Cowan Lake (Cowan Lake Sailing Association)	United States
442	Cuba Lake Yacht Club	United States
444	Seattle (Corinthian Yacht Club of Seattle)	United States
495	Mission Bay Yacht Club	United States
515	Acton Lake	United States
520	Barton Boat Club	United States
532	Annapolis (Severn Sailing Association)	United States
533	Willamette Sailing Club	United States
554	Beverly (Jubilee Yacht Club, Sail Salem)	United States
567	Lincoln Sailing Club	United States
573	Coronado Yacht Club	United States
580	Valdosta Yacht Club	United States
583	San Diego Yacht Club	United States
621	Chippewa Yacht Club	United States
625	Windycrest Sailing Club	United States
630	St. Johns River (Florida Yacht Club)	United States
640	Bow Mar Yacht Club	United States
654	Redwood Empire	United States
705	Carlyle Lake (Carlyle Sailing Association)	United States
715	Rush Creek Yacht Club	United States
720	Tsa-La-Gi Yacht Club	United States
747	Cleveland (Edgewater Yacht Club)	United States
762	North Cape (North Cape Yacht Club)	United States
777	Medford (Medford Boat Club)	United States
801	St. Petersburg (St. Petersburg Yacht Club)	United States
828	Birmingham (Birmingham Sailing Club)	United States
506	Yacht Club Uruguayo	Uruguay
725	Punta del Este	Uruguay
900	Acal Náutico Club	Uruguay
507	Caracas	Venezuela
635	Club Puerto Azul	Venezuela
