= Kathleen Tocke =

American sailor

Personal information
- Nationality: United States
- Born: June 14, 1978 (age 48) Buffalo, New York

Sport
- College team: Hobart and William Smith Colleges
- Club: Buffalo Canoe Club
Medal record
Pan American Games
Silver medal – second place	2011 Guadalajara	Snipe
Bronze medal – third place	2015 Toronto	Snipe
Silver medal – second place	2023 Santiago	Snipe
Snipe World Championships
Bronze medal – third place	2022 Cascais	Open
Silver medal – second place	2018 Newport	Women
Silver medal – second place	2008 Roquetas de Mar	Women
Bronze medal – third place	2010 St. Petersburg	Women
Snipe European Championships
Gold medal – first place	2021 Split	Open
Gold medal – first place	2019 Antwerp	Women
Silver medal – second place	2021 Antwerp	Women
Bronze medal – third place	2023 Lago di Garda	Open
Snipe Western Hemisphere & Orient Championship
Gold medal – first place	2018 Buenos Aires	Open
Bronze medal – third place	2023 Santiago	Open

Kathleen Tocke (born June 14, 1979) is an American sailor and world-class competitor in the 470, Snipe, 49er FX, Europe, RS:X and Laser Radial classes.

She competed in college with the Hobart and William Smith Colleges sailing team, and was a member of the US National Team in the Europe, RSX, and 49er FX classes and the US Pan American Games Team in the Snipe. In the Snipe class, she is a 2011 Pan American Games and 2023 Pan American Games silver medalist; 2015 Pan American Games bronze medalist; Masters World Champion (2016); Western Hemisphere & Orient Champion (2018); European Championship winner (2021); seven times North American Champion (2007, 2008, 2013, 2017, 2018, 2019, 2021); Women's European Champion (2019); and eight times United States National Champion (2003, 2008, 2009, 2010, 2011, 2019, 2021 and 2022).
