= Sea Cliff Yacht Club =

American yacht club

- Burgee
- Short name: SCYC
- Founded: 1892
- Location: 42 The Boulevard, Sea Cliff, New York 11579
- Website: seacliffyc.org

Sea Cliff Yacht Club is a yacht club located in Sea Cliff, New York. With access to the Long Island Sound via Hempstead Harbor.

== Description ==
Sea Cliff Yacht Club was founded in 1892. Members racing One-Designs have won World Championships in the Snipe (Philip Benson Jr. and Bill Benson, 1936 Worlds), Star and Sonar classes. The club hosted the Snipe Worlds in 1937, and the North Americans in 1981. Since 1977, Sea Cliff Yacht Club has hosted the Around Long Island Regatta.
