= Augie Diaz =

Cuban-born American yacht racer

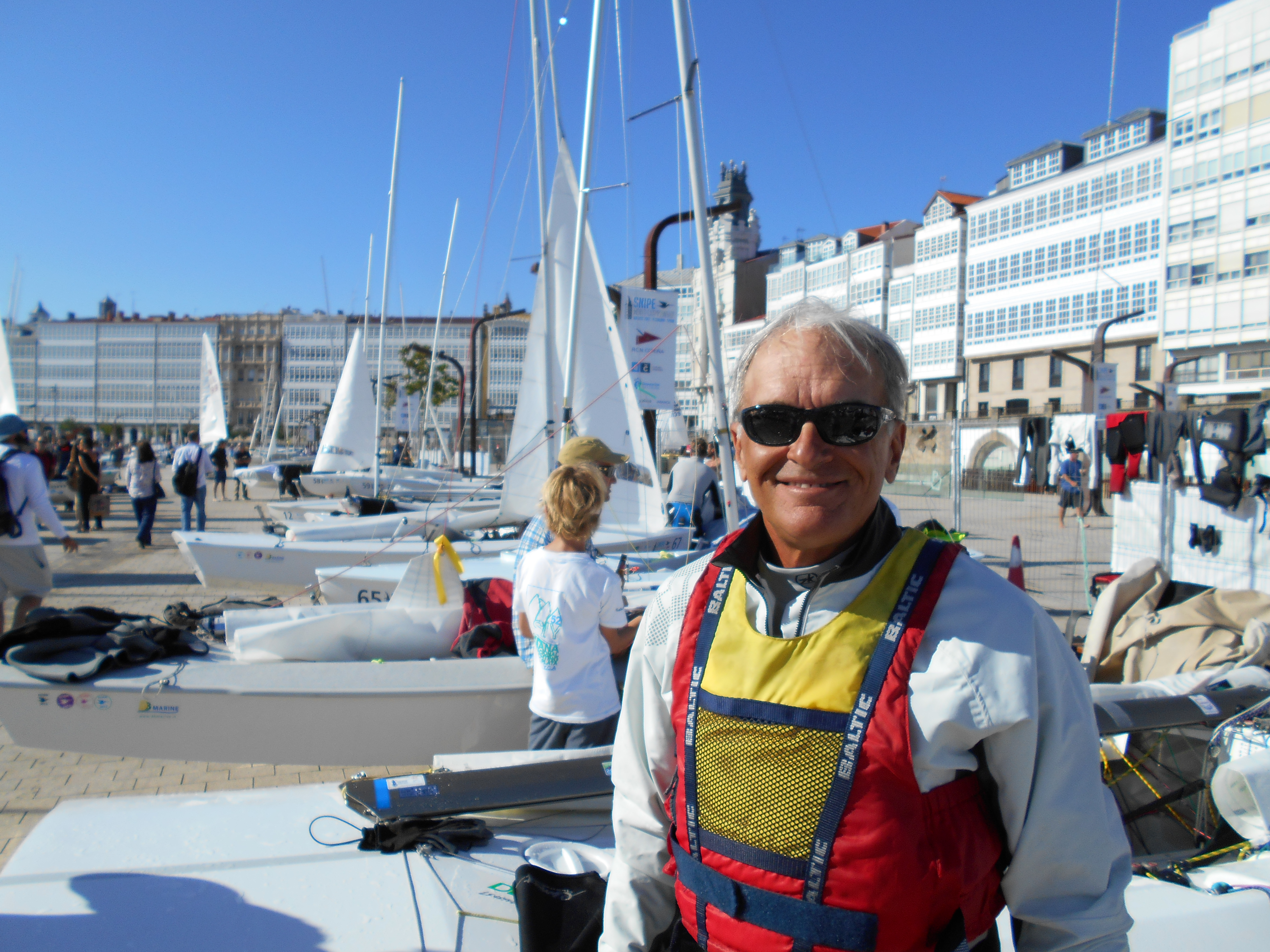
- Diaz in 2017

Personal information
- Nationality: United States
- Born: Agustín Gilberto Díaz; June 6, 1954 (age 72) Havana, Cuba

Sailing career
- Sport: Sailing
- College team: Tulane University
- Club: Coconut Grove Sailing Club; Coral Reef Yacht Club; Biscayne Bay Yacht Club
- Classes: Snipe, Star, Laser
Medal record
Sailing
Representing United States
World Championships
Gold medal – first place	2003 Borstahusen	Snipe
Gold medal – first place	2005 Gamagōri	Snipe
Gold medal – first place	2016 Miami	Star
Gold medal – first place	2002 St. Petersburg	Snipe (masters)
Gold medal – first place	2004 Bracciano	Snipe (masters)
Gold medal – first place	2006 Nassau	Snipe (masters)
Gold medal – first place	2012 Santiago de la Ribera	Snipe (masters)
Pan American Games
Silver medal – second place	1971 Cali	Snipe
Silver medal – second place	2011 Guadalajara	Snipe
Bronze medal – third place	2015 Toronto	Snipe

Agustín Díaz (born June 6, 1954), known as Augie Diaz, is an American sailor and world-class competitor in the Snipe, Star and Laser classes.

He is the son of Gonzalo Diaz, who sailed for Cuba at the 1959 Pan American Games.

He began sailing Optimists at the age of eight in Clearwater, Florida. In 1973, he won the IYRU Single-handed dinghy World Youth title in the Laser class. After graduating from Christopher Columbus High School (Miami) in 1972, Diaz sailed for Tulane University, where he studied Mechanical engineering. He was All American on the Tulane Green Wave sailing team in 1973, 1974 and 1975, won the ICSA Coed Dinghy National Championship in 1973 and the ICSA Men's Singlehanded National Championship in 1974, leading the team to win the Leonard M. Fowle Trophy in 1974. That same year he was elected ICSA College Sailor of the Year.

He received the US Sailor of the Year Award in 2003, and was inducted in the National Sailing Hall of Fame in 2021.

He has been Snipe world champion in 2003 and 2005, and Star world champion in 2016.

In the Snipe class, he was also world masters champion in 2002, 2004, 2006 y 2012; Western Hemisphere & Orient champion in 1972, 2002 and 2021; North American champion in 1974, 2004, 2006, 2007, 2008 and 2013; and U.S. National champion in 1974, 1980, 2001, 2002, 2006, 2008, 2009, 2010, 2011, 2018 and 2025.

He has won a silver medal in Snipe at the 1971 Pan American Games and a silver medal in the Snipe at the 2011 Pan American Games and a bronze medal at the 2015 Pan American Games.

== Pan American Games ==
- Silver medal in Snipe at Colombia 1971.
- Silver medal in Snipe at Guadalajara 2011.
- Bronze medal in Snipe at Toronto 2015.
