= New Rochelle Yacht Club =

- Burgee
- Short name: NRYC
- Founded: 1885
- Location: New Rochelle, New York United States

The New Rochelle Yacht Club (NRYC), formerly situated on Harrison Island with its anchorage in Echo Bay, was one of the foremost yacht clubs on Long Island Sound during the late nineteenth early twentieth century. The club was organized in 1885 and for several years had its headquarters on Harrison Island. Later it moved to the mainland occupying a larger site in Hudson Park on Echo Bay, and in 1901 was moved back again to Harrison Island, occupying the entire island.

From its inception the club was a leader among those organizations which catered particularly to the sailing element of yachtsmen, the percentage of boat owners always particularly high. When the first long-distance race for small boats from Sandy Hook to Marblehead was planned in 1904, the NRYC came to the fore with several entries, and later, when the Bermuda races started, the NRYC sent more boats in these contests than any other organization. Yachting It has turned out many notable sailors and its burgee was known in practically every known harbor between New York City and Newport.

Its regattas were better attended than any club on Long Island Sound.

The New Rochelle Yacht Club, on Harrison Island, was destroyed by fire in 1926.
