= Ted A. Wells =

American aviator and sailor (1907-1991)

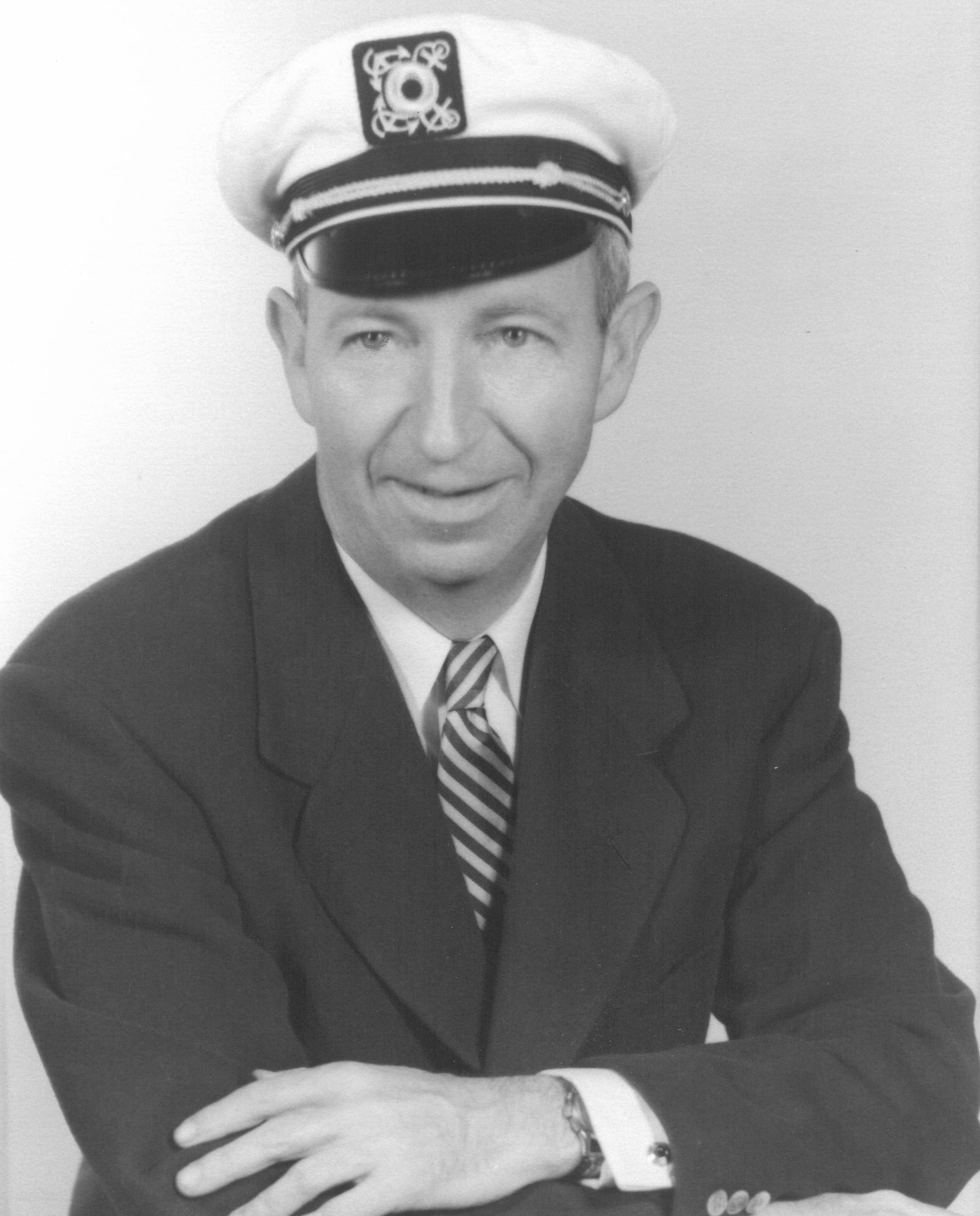
- Born: Theodore Arthur Wells; March 12, 1907; Corning, Iowa, U.S.
- Died: September 25, 1991 (aged 84); Wichita, Kansas, U.S.
- Occupation: Aircraft designer
- Spouse: Marge (Adair) Wells

Theodore Arthur Wells (March 12, 1907 – September 25, 1991) was an American aircraft engineer, co-founder of the Beech Aircraft Corporation, and the lead designer of the Beechcraft Model 17 Staggerwing. Wells was also an avid Snipe sailboat racer, winning three national championships and two world championships.

== Birth and education ==
Theodore A. Wells was born in Corning, Iowa and was the first aeronautical engineering graduate at Princeton University. The Princeton school of Engineering was founded just a few years prior in 1921, with programs in Chemical, Geological, and Mechanical engineering. It started with fewer than 100 students. Mechanical engineering classes were held in the old School of Science with a makeshift laboratory in a boiler house. Wells specifically wanted a degree in aeronautical engineering and was able to convince the school to allow him to pursue that goal, although he had to tell the school which requirements he needed to satisfy.

== First airplane ==
While a sophomore, Wells and a classmate had the opportunity to buy an old World War I Jenny for US$600. Neither he nor his classmate had pilot's licenses, so they came up with a scheme to buy the plane and rent it out for rides and flying lessons. This enabled them to pay for the plane and fund their own flying lessons. Both of their parents had previously refused to pay for flying lessons. They had learned that Princeton had a policy that students whose parents had difficulty raising tuition could postpone payment until the end of the semester. Wells and his friend informed the school that their parents were struggling financially and used the tuition money their parents gave them up front to buy the aircraft.

They offered their plane for lessons and rides, charging $25/hr, paying an instructor $10 and keeping $15 to pay off the airplane and their tuition. Customers were drawn from a "sucker list" of upperclassmen that they also used for bumming car rides to the airfield. During spring break, Wells found himself alone at the Hadley airfield more than 20 miles away from the college with no money and no ride back to school. He waited until dusk, but no potential ride showed up. He was determined not to walk the distance back to campus. With only four hours and 20 minutes of flying instruction he decided it was time to solo without an endorsement from his instructor. He started the airplane, flew to Princeton and landed in a field frequently used by barnstormers.

According to Wells, "the Dean got excited because Princeton sophomores were not supposed to have motor vehicles". Fortunately, that stunt did not get him suspended, but the incident was noted by The New York Times as a box story on its front page. It was from this that Well's father learned that he had purchased the Jenny. Wells said his parents did not force him to sell the airplane. "They were resigned to the fact that if I was going to be in the airplane business, I should learn to fly. But they didn’t exactly like the way I was doing it." By the end of the semester, the pair of students had not raised sufficient funds to pay for tuition, so they were forced to sell the Jenny for the $600 they had paid for it.

== Aviation career ==
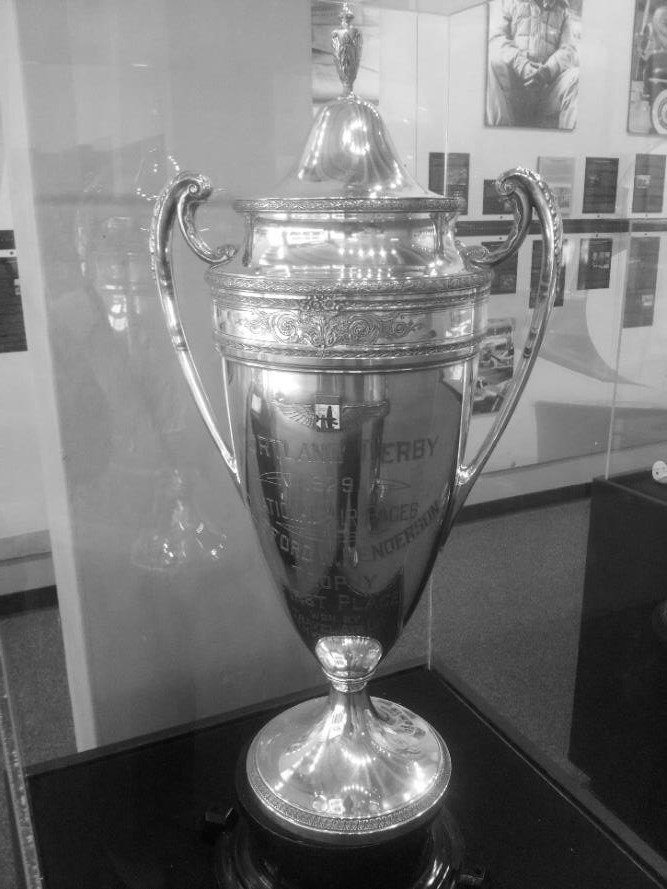
1929 National Air Races Portland Derby Trophy won by Ted Wells.

Wells purchased a Travel Air D4000 in 1928 and used it for air racing, flying in the 1929 Portland Derby which was part of the National Air Races. This was a cross country race from Portland to Cleveland, which involved navigation skills, as well as maximizing aircraft speed. Wells won this race, receiving $10,000 in prize money.

Wells was hired by Travel Air, a division of Curtiss-Wright as a part-time demonstration pilot in 1928, during the summer of his junior year at Princeton. He then was hired by the company full-time as a design engineer after he graduated in 1929, filling the engineering void left by Clyde Cessna and Lloyd Stearman. Wells and Herb Rawdon designed the Travel Air models 12 & 16. In his spare time in 1930, Wells designed and built a racing biplane, the Model W4B, also known as the Wells Special. During one of the flight tests, he was flying at 200 mph (322 km/h) only 500 ft (152 m) above the ground, when both ailerons tore off the wings. Ted managed to bail out and deploy his parachute just in time, suffering only a broken ankle when he landed in mud.

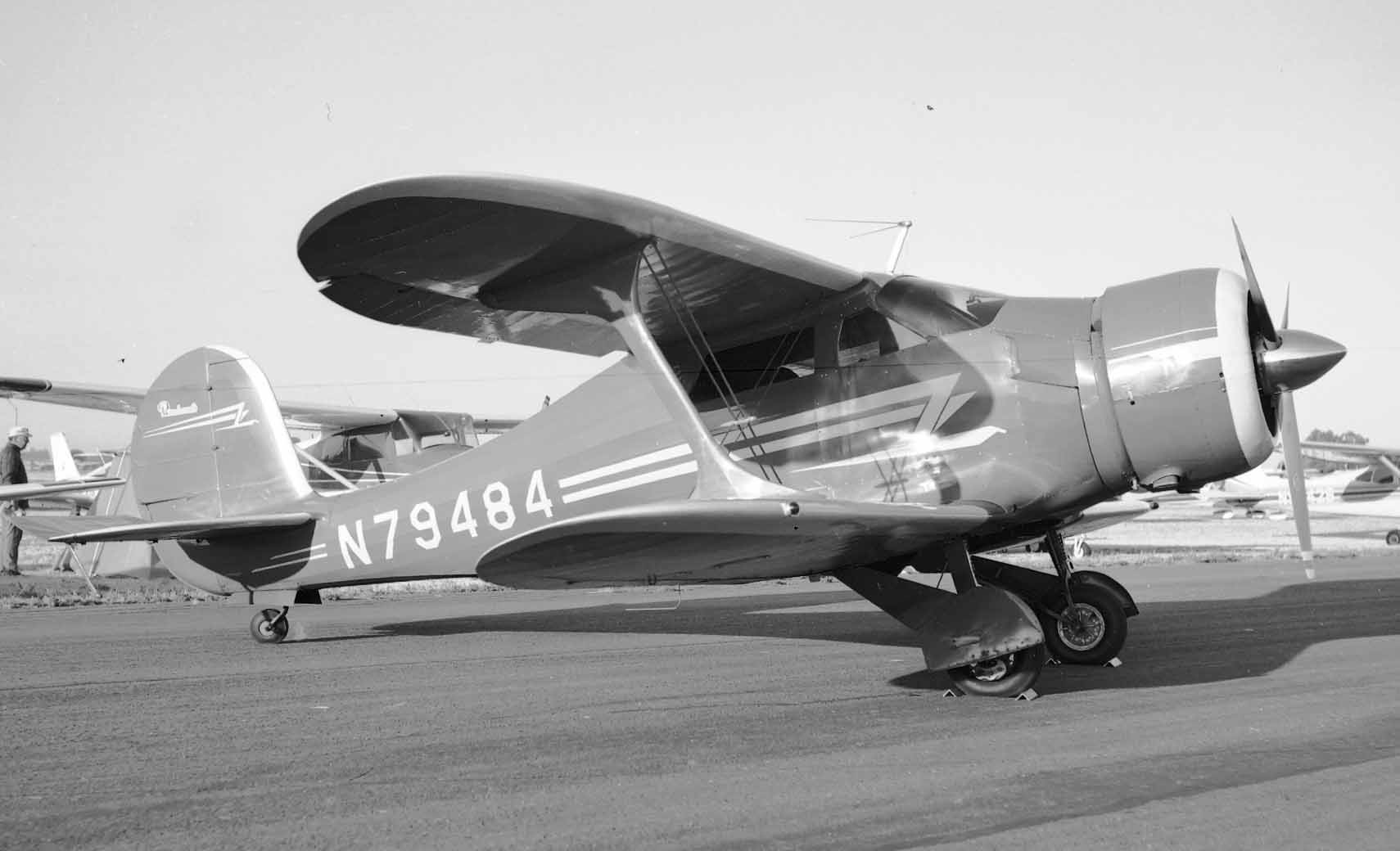
Beech D-17S N79484 (6964558512)

In 1931, Wells began producing the next design for Travel Air. The Model 17 was a four place enclosed cockpit biplane with an unconventional placement of the top wing aft of the bottom wing. This was done to improve visibility associated with the standard configuration.

Then president of Travel Air, Walter Beech, was impressed with Wells' Model 17 "Staggerwing" drawings and presented them to the Curtiss-Wright management to persuade them to build it. Curtis-Wright directors declined to pursue the program due to financial reasons. Desiring to continue Wells' Model 17 design, Walter Beech, Olive Ann Beech, K.K. Shaul and Ted Wells resigned from Curtis-Wright's Aircraft division to start up a new company, Beech Aircraft to produce the Model 17.

Walter Beech, Olive Ann Beech, Ted Wells, K.K. Shaul and C.G. Yankey become the principle founders of Beech Aircraft in April 1932. Walter Beech was named President and Wells became Vice President of Engineering and Chief Designer. C.G. Yankey was a friend of the Beech's and a prime investor, so he was named Vice President. K.K. Shaul, General Manager at Travel Air and Comptroller before relocating to St. Louis, was named Treasurer. Olive Ann Beech was named Secretary.

In his position as engineering vice president, Well's engineering team designed the Model 18, Model 33, T-34 Mentor, Model 34 Twin-Quad, and Model 50 among others.

== Sailing ==
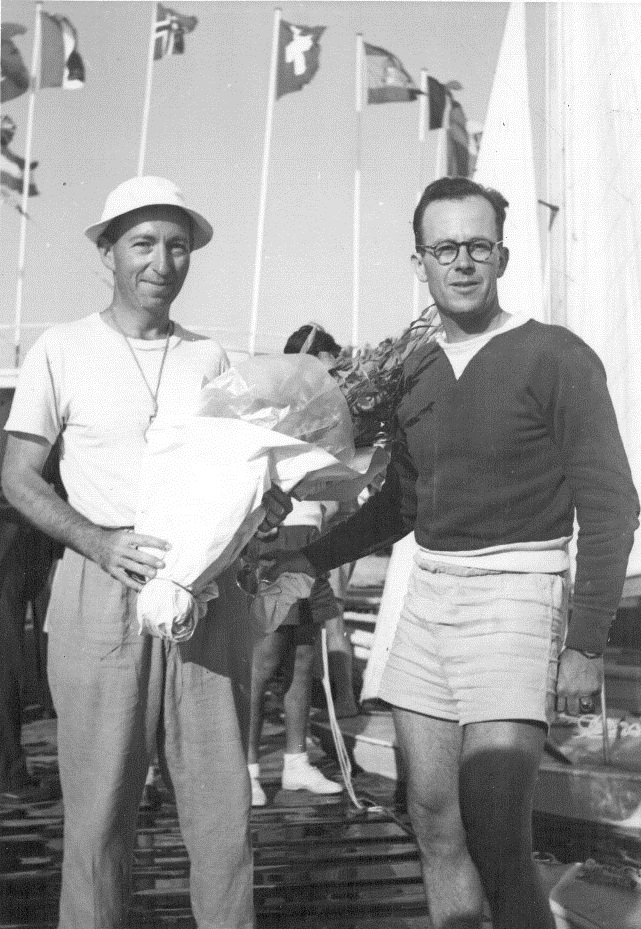
Ted Wells & crew Art Lippitt after winning the 1947 Snipe World Championships

Wells joined the Wichita Sailing Club in 1938 and started racing Snipe sailboats. He bought his first boat for $100. It had bed sheets for sails. Wells decided to race sailboats, rather than airplanes, as it was becoming difficult to find the time for racing airplanes. Wells quickly became proficient at racing on Santa Fe Lake. He was instrumental in organizing the club's first invitational regatta and began trailering his Snipe around the country to participate in other regattas.

Wells won many regattas including the 1947, 1949 and 1952 United States Snipe National Championships, as well as the 1947 and 1949 Snipe World Championships. Wells also authored the book "Scientific Sailboat Racing" which was widely read in the sailing racing community.

Wells' championship boat "Good News III" (number 6025) was built by Varalyay, a professional boat builder in California. It is on display in the small boat collection at the Mystic Seaport Museum in Connecticut.

== Retirement ==
After Walter Beech's death in 1950, Olive Ann Beech became the president of Beech Aircraft. There were tensions between Wells and Olive Ann Beech. Publicly, Olive Ann Beech said she did not like Wells spending time sailing and thought he needed to spend more time focused on the company. In 1953, she sent an aircraft down to bring Wells back from the Snipe National Championships in Ardmore, Oklahoma for an "emergency meeting" back at Beechcraft headquarters in Wichita, Kansas. Wells left the regatta, attended the meeting during which Olive Ann Beech told him, "I think that you ought to have all the free time you need for your interests. We accept your resignation." Wells signed the resignation letter and immediately returned to the regatta.

After leaving Beech, Wells did some contract work for Cessna Aircraft, then changed careers and bought the controlling stock of the Union National Bank. He continued to race Snipes including his last competition, the 1986 National Master's regatta hosted by the Atlanta Yacht Club, when he was 79 years old.

During retirement, Wells and his wife Marge flew from New York to a Paris vacation on the Concorde at Mach 2.

== Death ==
Wells died on September 25, 1991, at the age of 84.
