= Dave Chapin =

American sailor

Personal information
- Full name: David Chapin
- Nationality: American
- Born: Springfield, Illinois, U.S.

Sport
- Country: United States
- Sport: Sailing
- College team: University of Texas at Austin
- Club: Lake Eustis Sailing Club; Island Bay Yacht Club
Medal record
Sailing
Representing Argentina
Pan American Games
Gold medal – first place	1987 Indianapolis	Snipe
Snipe World Championships
Gold medal – first place	1979 North Sydney	Snipe

David Chapin is an American sailor, 3 time World Champion in the Sunfish and Snipe classes, gold medalist at the Pan American Games, and winner of multiple North American and United States Championships in Sunfish, Snipe, Laser, 470 and Soling classes.

He was U.S. Singlehanded Champion in 1977, sailed in Laser.

In 1978 he was second at the Sunfish World Championship.

In 1979 he won the Snipe World Championship, the Sunfish World Championship, the Snipe North American Championship, and the United States Snipe National Championship.

In 1980 he won the Snipe Western Hemisphere & Orient Championship, and was second at the Sunfish World Championship.

In 1981 he won again the Sunfish World Championship, and the United States Snipe National Championship.

In 1982 he was third at the Sunfish World Championship, and won his second Snipe Western Hemisphere & Orient Championship, and his third United States Snipe National Championship.

In 1987 he won the gold medal at the Pan American Games.

He is of English ancestry being a direct descendant of Deacon Samuel Chapin.
