= SCIRA =

Snipe Class International Racing Association

Snipe Class International Racing Association
- Sport: Sailing
- Abbreviation: SCIRA
- Founded: 1932; 94 years ago
- Affiliation: World Sailing
- Other key staff: Cesar Travado (executive director)
- Commodore: Martín Bermúdez de la Puente

Official website
- www.snipe.org

The Snipe Class International Racing Association (SCIRA) is the governing body for the Snipe class in the sport of sailing, recognized as an international class by World Sailing.

== History ==
SCIRA was established in November 1932, and Hub E. Isaacks of Snipe fleet number 1 at Dallas Sailing Club was the first commodore. In March 1933, SCIRA chartered fleet number 8 to the Royal Cinque Ports Yacht Club in Dover Harbour, Kent, becoming the first fleet established outside the United States. By 1936, the Snipe class became the world's largest racing class.

== Board officers ==
The SCIRA Board of Governors holds bi-annual meetings, usually during the World Championship.

Board of governors
Voting members
Officer	Name	Tenure	Period
Commodore	(Spain) Martín Bermúdez de la Puente	2 years	2025–26
Vice commodore	(Brazil) Paola Prada	2 years	2025–26
Secretary	(United States) Taylor Scheuermann	2 years	2025–26
Treasurer	(Belgium) Yannick Laumans	4 years	2023–26
Rules chairman	(Italy) Antonio Bari	4 years	2023–26
General secretary – Europe	(Portugal) Manuel Stichini Vilela	2 years	2025–26
General secretary – WH&O	(Chile) Alberto Prieto	2 years	2025–26
Non-voting members
Officer	Name	Tenure	Period
Chief measurer	(Spain) Luis González Álvarez	3 years	2025–28
Executive director	(Spain) Cesar Travado	No limit	2026–
Legal counsel	(United States) Leigh Savage	No limit	

== Past commodores ==
Former SCIRA commodores:

Period	Commodore
1933	(United States) Hub E. Isaacks
1934	(United States) M. J. Davis
1935	(United States) A. H. Bosworth
1936	(United States) M. S. A. Reichner
1937	(United States) Harry Lund
1938	(United States) G. Q. McGown Jr.
1939	(United States) Taver Bayly
1940	(United States) H. R. Schuette
1941	(United States) Perry Bass
1942–43	(United States) C. R. Miller
1944	(United States) W. G. Green
1945	(United States) George Becker
1946	(United States) Charles Heinzerling
1947–48	(United States) Donald R. Simonds
1949	(United States) Harold Griffith
1950	(United States) Roy T. Hurley
1951	(United States) John T. Hayward
1952	(United States) Owen E. Duffy
1953	(United States) Carl Zimmerman
1954	(United States) Ted A. Wells
1955	(United States) Eddie Williams
1956	(United States) Harold L. Gilreath
1957	(United States) Terry Whittemore
1958	(United States) Fred Schenck
1959	(United States) Alan Levinson
1960	(United States) Edward Garfield
1961	(United Kingdom) F. V. G. Penman
1962	(United States) Sam W. Norwood
1963	(United States) Floyd E. Hughes
1964–65	(United States) A. F. Hook

Period	Commodore
1966–67	(The Bahamas) Basil Kelly
1968–69	(United States) Robert Schaeffer
1970	(Spain) Ángel Riveras
1971	(United States) William M. Kilpatrick
1972	(United States) Richard L. Tillman
1973–74	(United States) Ralph M. Swanson
1975	(United States) Stuart L. Griffing
1976	(Sweden) Svend Rantil
1977	(United States) Dan Williams
1978	(United States) Bruce Colyer
1979	(Brazil) Flavio Caiuby
1980	(United States) Gonzalo E. Diaz Sr.
1981	(United States) Paul F. Festersen
1982	(Spain) Arturo Delgado
1983	(United States) Douglas DeSouza
1984	(United States) Eugene T. Tragus
1985	(Argentina) Roberto J. Salvat
1986–87	(Bermuda) Wayne Soares
1988	(United States) Jerry Thompson
1989	(Finland) Per Ole Holm
1990	(United States) Peter Fenner
1991	(United States) R. Means Davis
1992	(Japan) Fujiya Matsumoto
1993	(United States) Terry Timm
1994	(Uruguay) Horacio Garcia Pastori
1995	(The Bahamas) Jimmie Lowe
1996	(Italy) Giorgio Brezich
1997	(United States) Gonzalo Diaz Jr.
1998	(Japan) Akibumi Shinoda
1999	(United States) Lee Griffith

Period	Commodore
2000	(Canada) Id Crook
2001	(Brazil) Bertel Bojlesen
2002	(Norway) Birger Jansen
2003	(United States) Brainard Cooper
2004	(Japan) Jiro Yamamoto
2005	(Brazil) Henrique Motta
2006–07	(The Bahamas) Robert Dunkley
2008–09	(Uruguay) Pedro Garra
2010–11	(Portugal) Luis Pessanha
2012–13	(United States) Don Bedford
2014–15	(Brazil) Ricardo Lobato
2016–17	(Canada) Gweneth Crook
2018–19	(Italy) Pietro Fantoni
2020–22	(Argentina) Luis Soubié
2023–24	(Poland) Zbigniew Rakocy

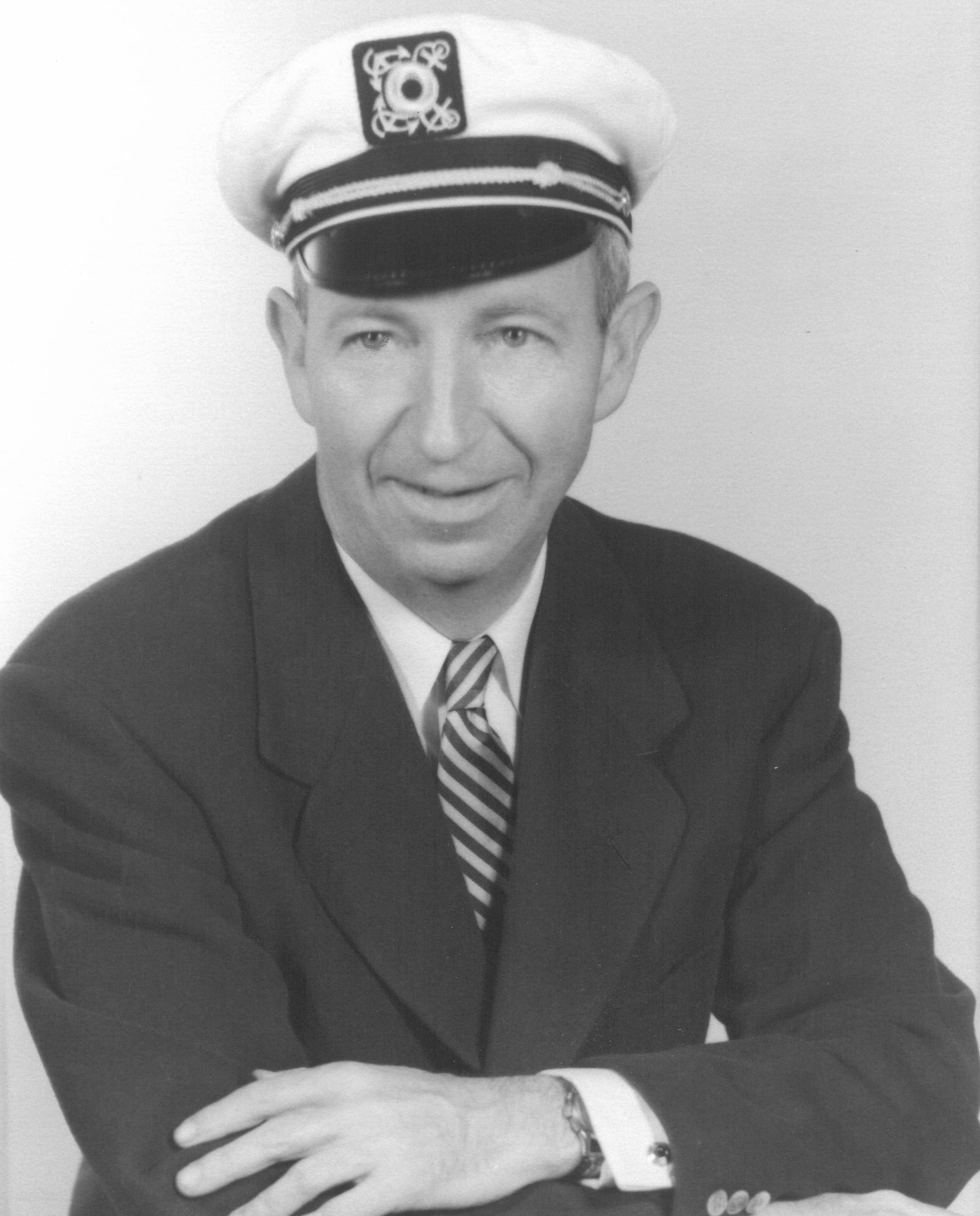
Ted Wells, 1954 commodore.

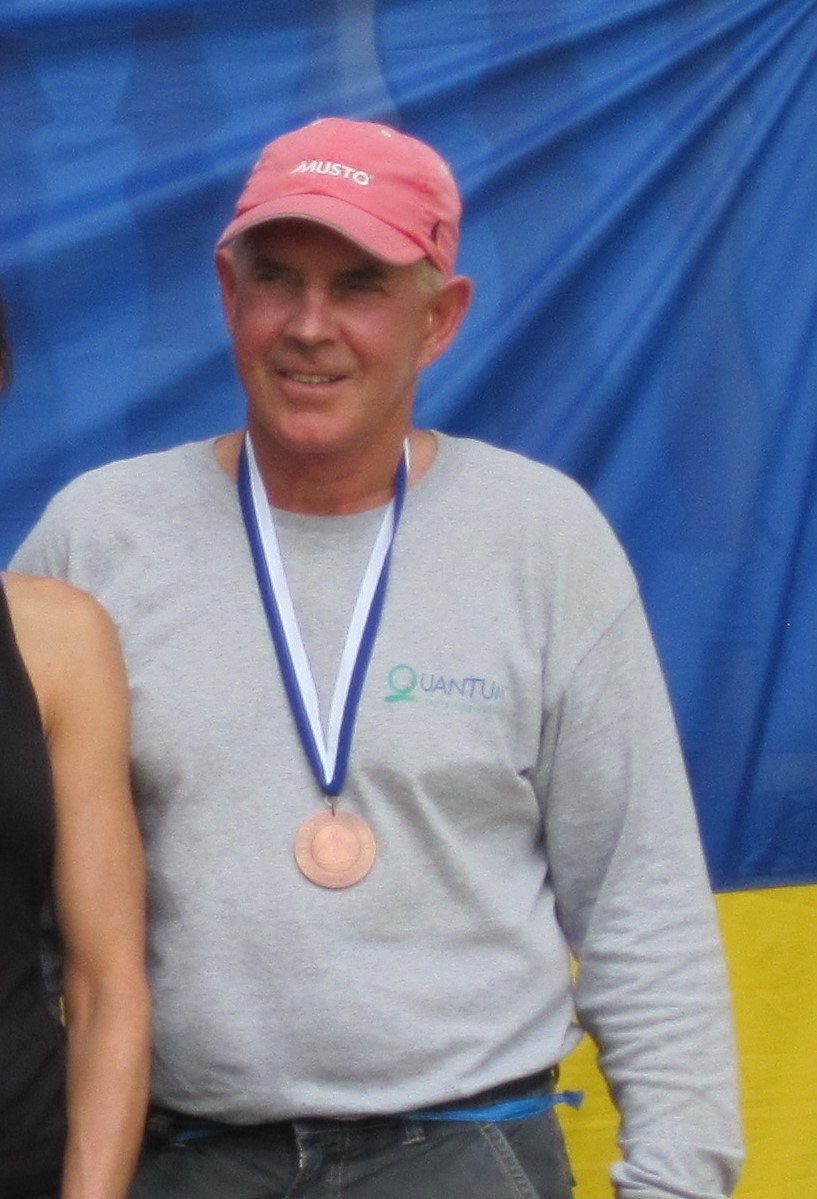
Birger Jansen, 2002 commodore.

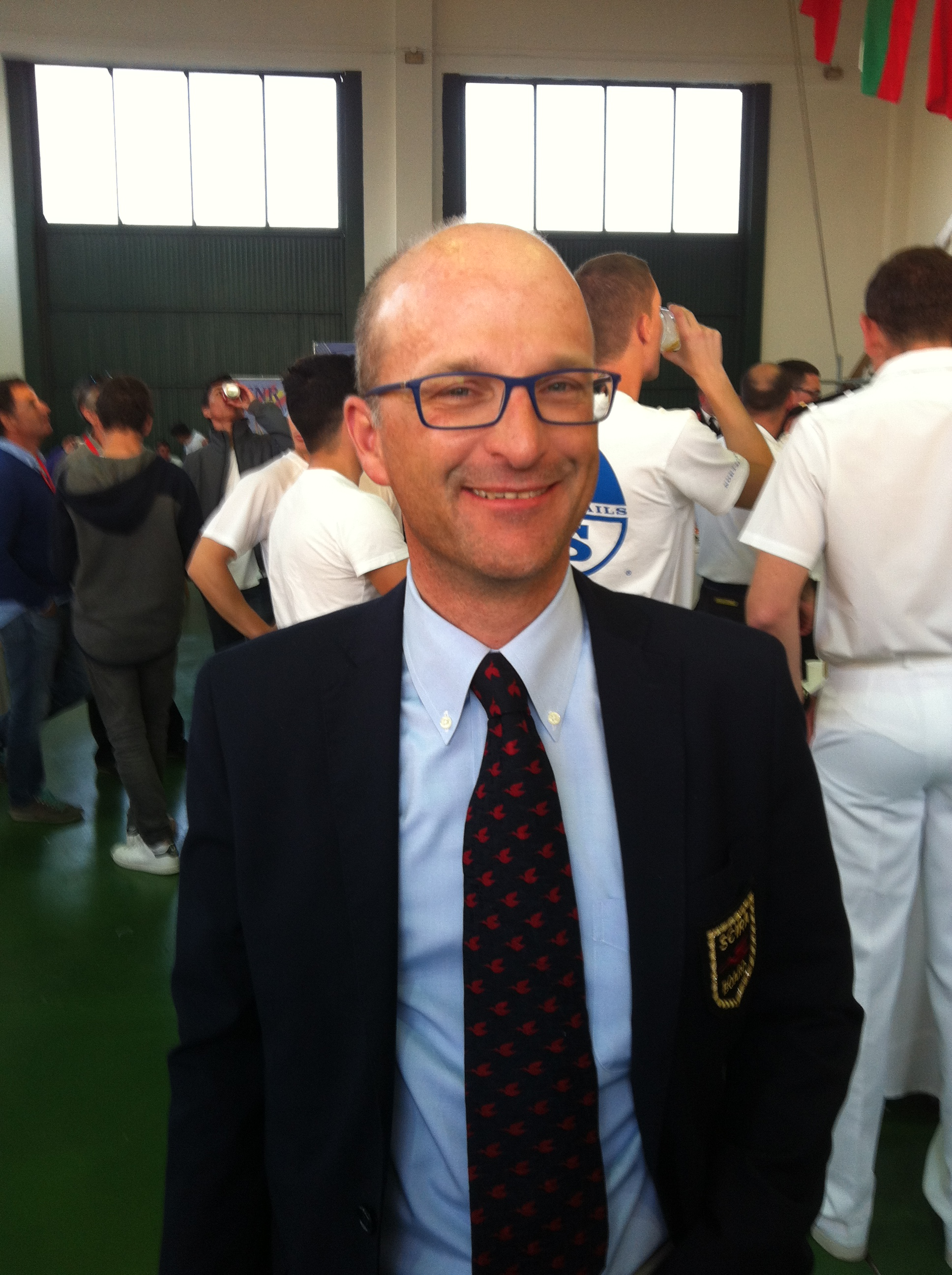
Pietro Fantoni, 2018-19 commodore.
