= Newport Harbor Yacht Club =

American yachting club in Newport Beach, California

Coordinates: 32.717038°N 117.228692°W

- Burgee
- Founded: 1916
- Location: 720 West Bay Ave Balboa Peninsula Newport Beach, California
- Website: www.nhyc.org

Newport Harbor Yacht Club is a yacht club located on the Balboa Peninsula, which is a neighborhood of the city of Newport Beach, Orange County, California.

== Facilities ==
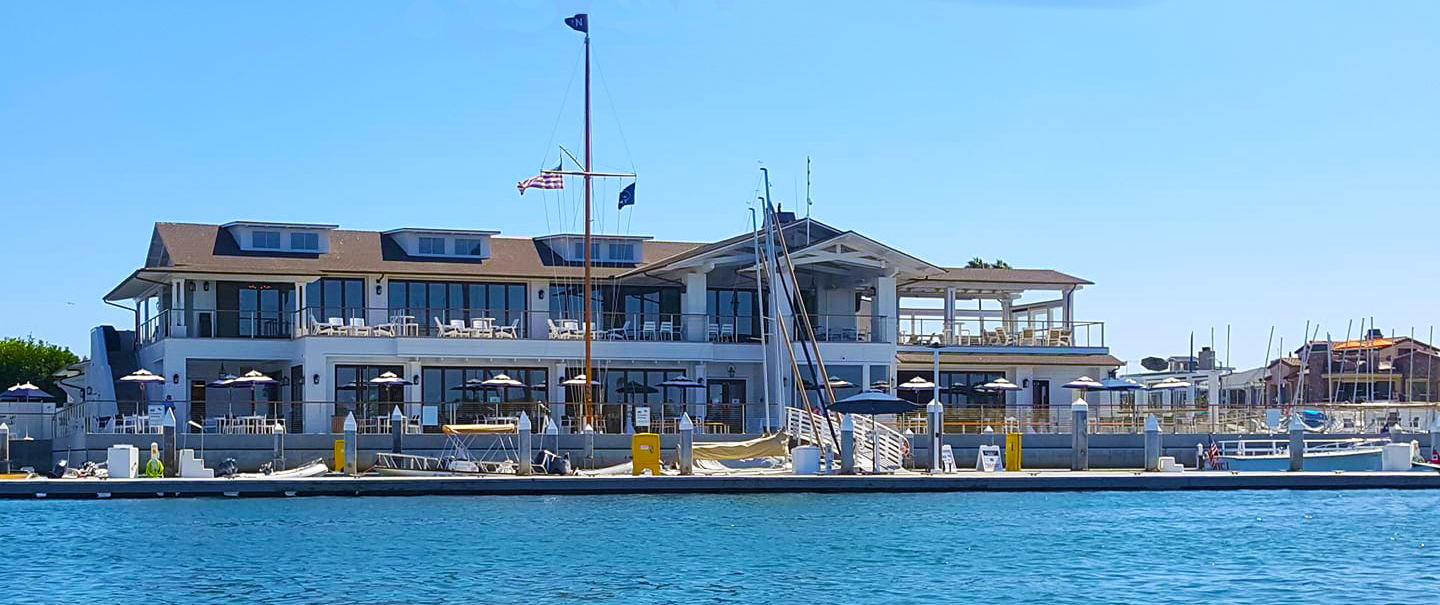
The Newport Harbor Yacht Club, 2020.

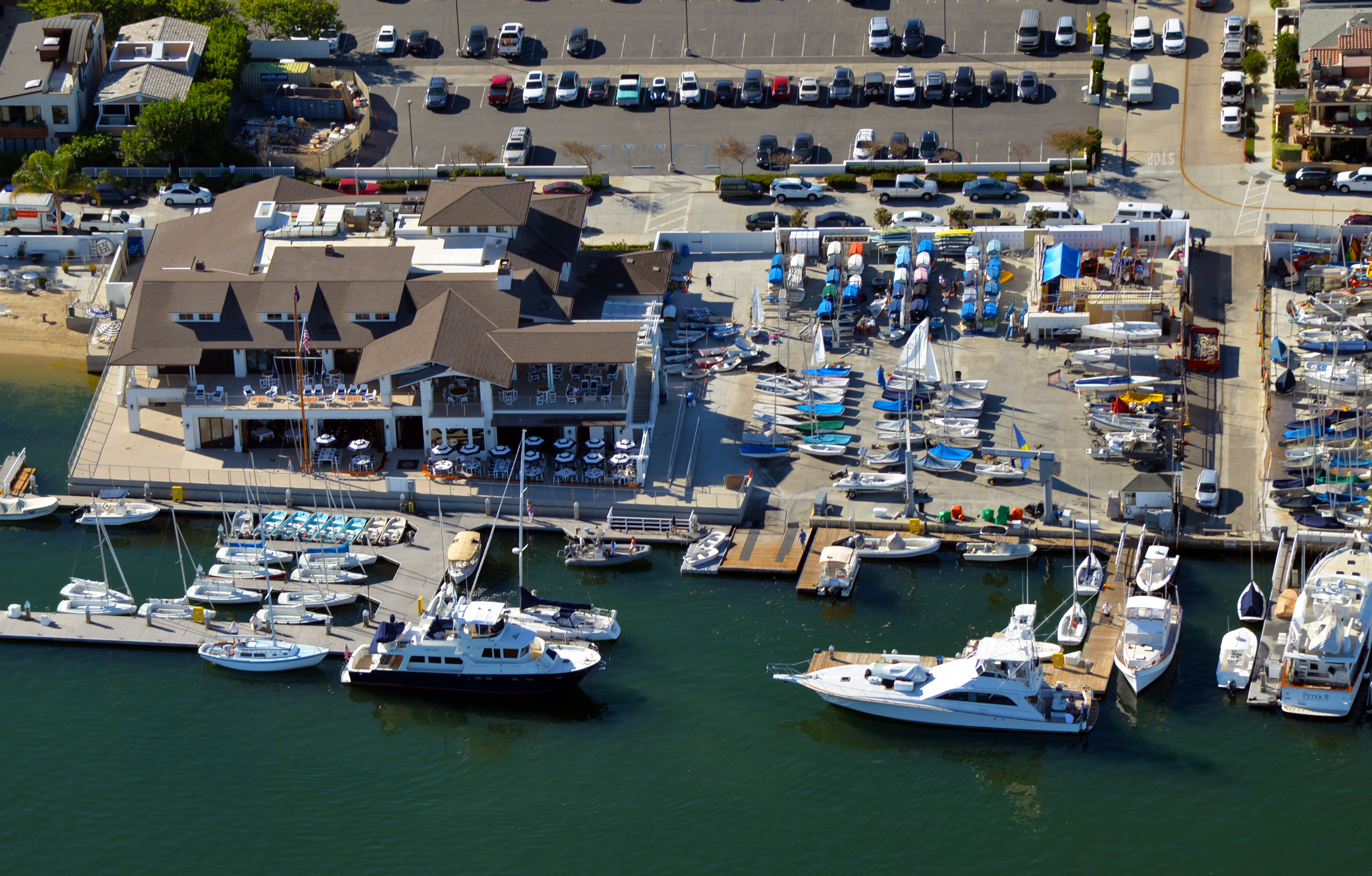
The Newport Harbor Yacht Club, 2018

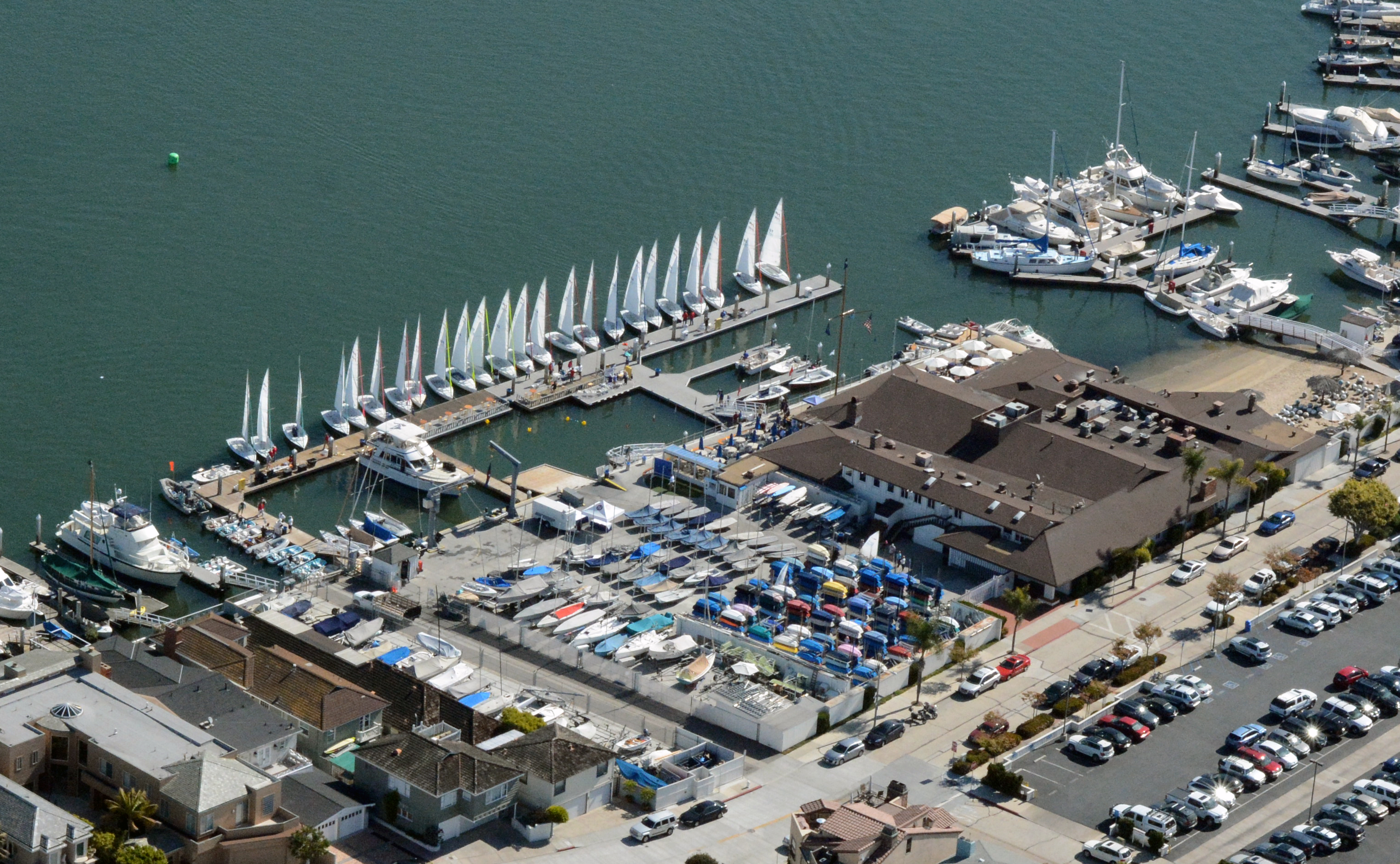
Newport Harbor Yacht Club Baldwin Cup April 6, 2014

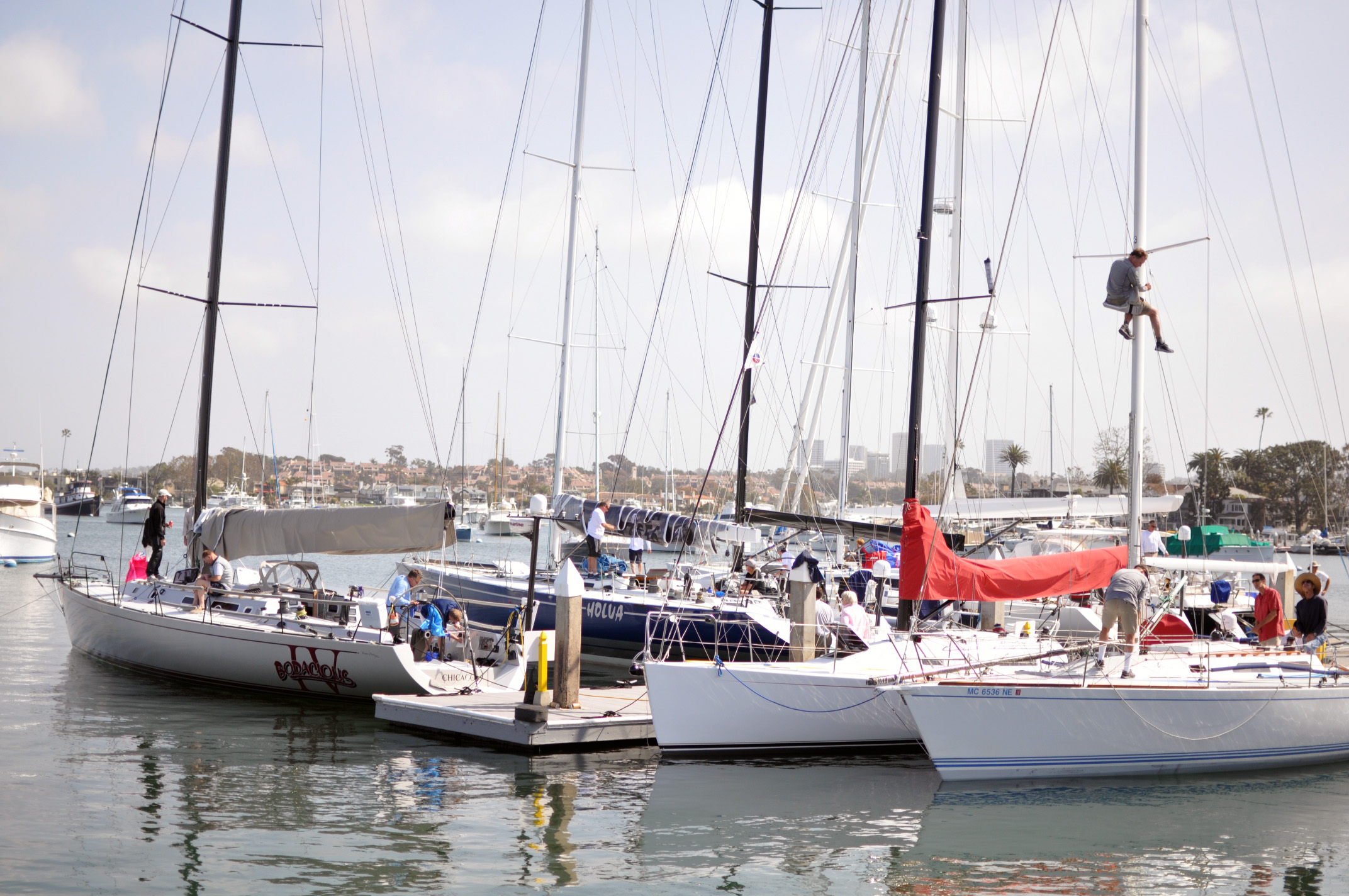
Racing yachts at NHYC's main dock

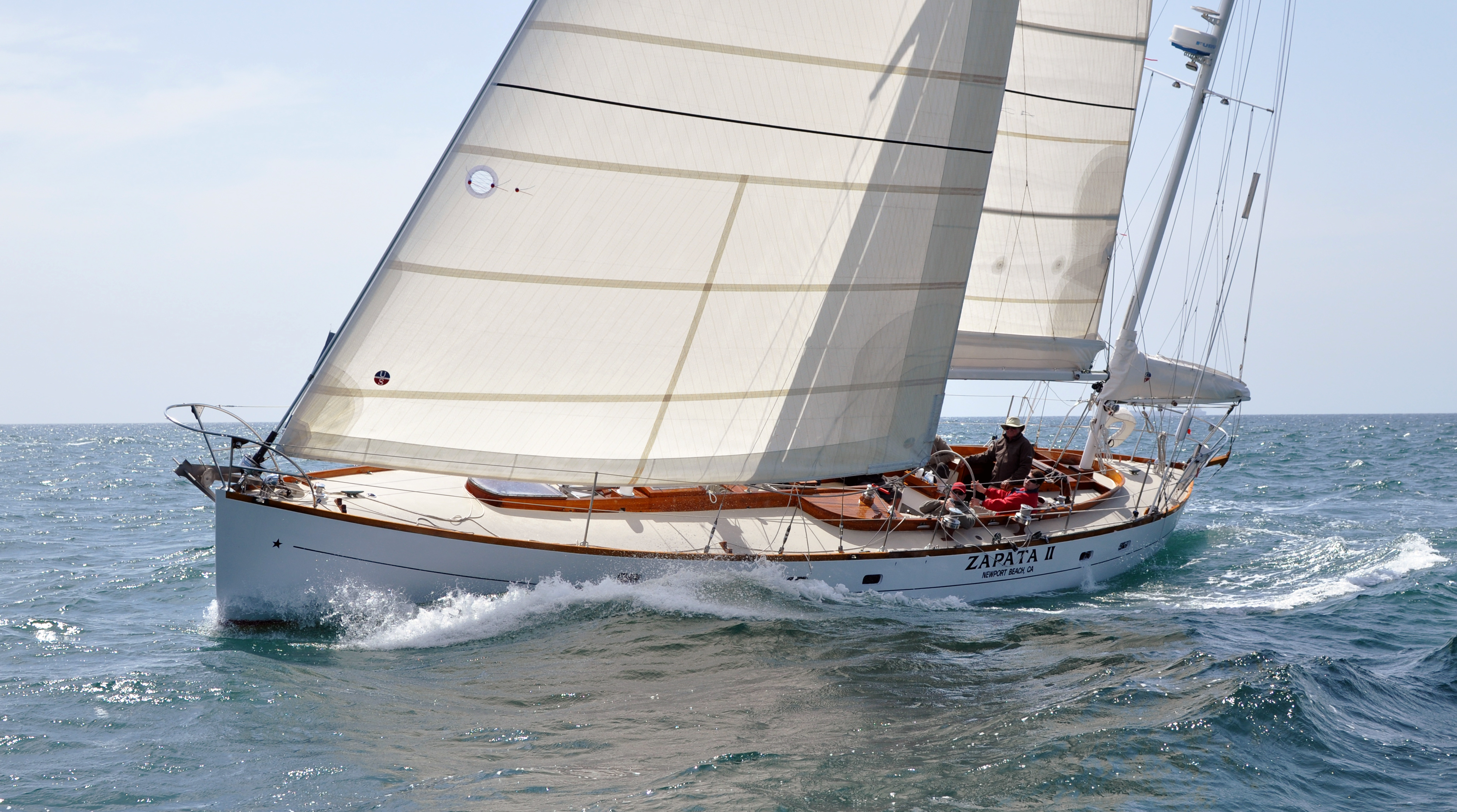
2013 Ahmanson Cup Regatta yacht Zapata II winner of the 2014 Zapata II won best in class (sailing boats over 50 feet) at the first annual Newport Beach Wooden Boat Festival.

The Newport Harbor Yacht Club facility has a main dining room and outdoor seating, a private beach, and a pavilion equipped with a barbecue and snack bar. There are mooring cans, plus both wet and dry slips available for members and guests. The wet slips can accommodate boats up to 55 feet in length, and the dry slips are for smaller boats up to 25 feet in length. The club is open 5 days a week, plus a full-time dock staff and shore boat. The club has applied for a building permit to replace their 1919 clubhouse with a larger, modern building.

The Newport Harbor Yacht Club also leases Moonstone cove on Santa Catalina Island.

== Fleets ==
Newport Harbor Yacht Club is home to multiple fleets, many of which race regularly. There are fleets of Naples Sabots, FJs, Stars, Harbor 20s, Finns, Lehman 12s and an adult women's Sabot fleet. Most of the larger boats race outside of Newport Harbor in the Pacific Ocean.

== Regattas ==
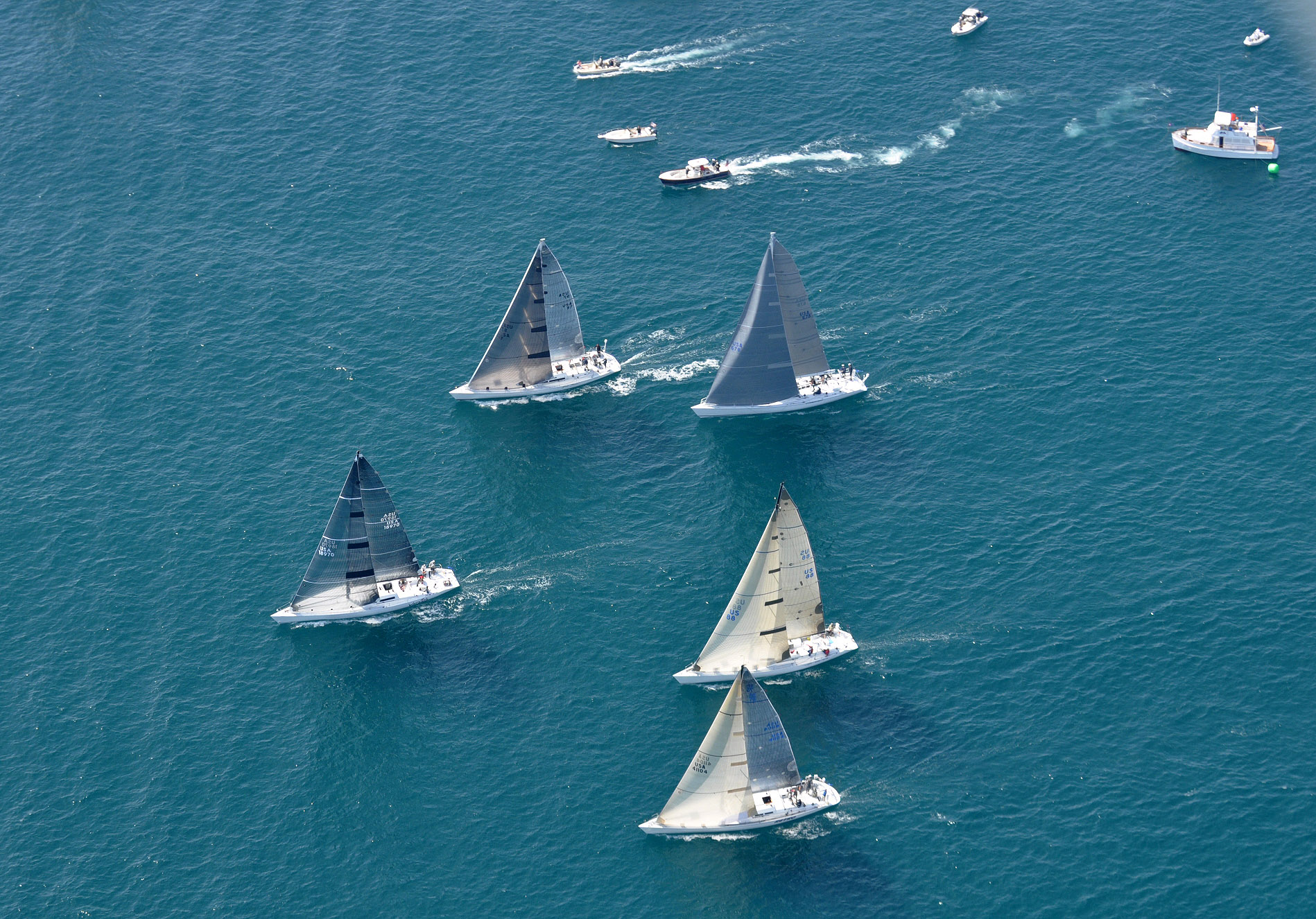
Cabo San Lucas Race Start 2013

The Newport Harbor Yacht Club is the home of many national and international regattas each year.

- Bi-annual Newport Beach to Cabo San Lucas race
- Sabot Nationals
- Baldwin Cup Team Race
- Star North Americans
- Snipe North American Championship in 1991

== Eagle Foundation (USA) ==
- 1987 Americas Cup Contender "Eagle"

== Junior sailing program ==
Newport Harbor Yacht Club has a junior sailing program, which consists of a full-time junior program director, coaches, maintenance and administrative staff. Facilities include a junior clubhouse, tool room, Sabot and Laser storage spaces, sail and boat wash areas a launching ramp and two cranes.

== See also ==
- List of International Council of Yacht Clubs members
