= Corpus Christi Yacht Club =

Yacht club in Texas, U.S.

- Burgee
- Short name: CCYC
- Founded: December 13, 1923; 101 years ago
- Location: 98 Coopers Alley, Corpus Christi, Texas, U.S.
- Website: ccyc.com

The Corpus Christi Yacht Club is an American private yacht club located in Corpus Christi, Texas, which belongs to the Texas Sailing Association.

== History ==
The club was incorporated on November 13, 1923. In 1950, it merged with the Southwestern Yacht Club. (Note: The Southwestern Yacht Club was the result of another merge that took place in 1949 between the Southwestern Yacht Club, founded in 1945, and the Corpus Christi Sailing Club, founded at the same time by members of the Thomas Lipton Yacht Club.) The two clubs had been the most active racing clubs in Corpus Christi. CCSC's first regatta, a 12 boat Snipe competition, took place June 15 and 16, 1946. In this class, Billy Wicker, commodore of the Southwestern Yacht Club, and Robert Vetters won the United States Snipe National Championship, hosted at the club in 1948.

CCYC hosted the Optimist World Championship in 2002, and the Melges 24 World Championship in 2011.
