= Dick Tillman =

American competitive sailor (1936–2020)

Personal information
- Full name: Richard L. Tillman
- Born: November 27, 1936
- Died: October 15, 2020 (aged 83) Syracuse, Indiana, United States

Sailing career
- Sport: Sailing
- College team: United States Naval Academy
Medal record
Sailing
Representing the United States
Pan American Games
Bronze medal – third place	1959 Chicago	Snipe class

Richard L. Tillman, known as Dick Tillman, (November 27, 1936 – October 15, 2020) was an American sailor. He was a member of the United States sailing team at the 1976 Summer Olympics as an alternate and was named US Sailor of the Year in 1965.

He is a class of 2024 National Sailing Hall of Fame inductee.

He started sailing as a teenager at Wawasee Yacht Club crewing for Alan (Buzz) Levinson, his older brother Frank and his younger brother, Harry, in their Snipes.

== College ==
Dick Tillman was National Intercollegiate Sailing Champion with the U.S. Naval Academy in 1957, and became a member of the ICSA Hall of Fame for Competitive Achievement after graduation in 1958.

== Sailing career ==
Dick Tillman holds national, North American and world titles in the Snipe, Finn, Laser and Sunfish classes:

- U.S. National Champion in Snipe (1959), Finn (1965),
- North American Champion in Laser (1971, 1972 and 1973), and Finn (1965).

He also won a bronze medal at the 1959 Pan American Games in Snipe.

In the Masters category, he also holds several championships:

- International Sunfish Masters Champion in 1995, 1996, 1998 and 2002.
- World Great Grand Masters Laser radial Champion in 2002.
- North American Laser Masters Champion in 1981 and 1982.
- World Masters Games
  - Silver Medalist at the 1998 Nike World Masters in Windsurfing
  - Bronze Medalist at the 1998 Nike World Masters in Laser

== Organizational activities ==
Dick Tillman has been a member of the United States Sailing Association for over 30 years and director for 3 years (1999-2002), chair of National Single-handed Championship Committee for 7 years, commodore of the Snipe Class International Racing Association (1971), sailing representative to USOC Athletes Advisory Council (1976-1980), Executive Director of the International J/24 Class Association (1981-1991), and president of the US Windsurfing Association, president of the International Sunfish Class Association (2002-2006).

== Books ==
He wrote The Complete Book of Laser Sailing, published by McGraw Hill in 2005.
