= Quassapaug Sailing Center =

- Burgee
- Short name: QSC
- Founded: 1999
- Location: West Lake Road, Middlebury, Connecticut 06762
- Website: www.qsailingcenter.org

The Quassapaug Sailing Center (QSC) is a nonprofit educational institution located on Middlebury, Connecticut, on the shore of Lake Quassapaug.

The Sailing Center provides educational and recreational sailing programs to those who wish to develop competent sailors skills for small boat racing, pleasure, or large boat sailing in coastal waters, as well as family sailing.

== History ==
The building was built in 1927 by the Whittemore family, of Middlebury, originally a summer retreat for children from Waterbury. In 1945, it became the new location for the Lake Quassapaug Yacht Club as well as being used by the Waterbury Boys and Girls Club for a summer camp. The Yacht Club remained in the location until 2003. At that time, the newly formed Quassapaug Sailing Center, Inc. purchased the property.

== Fleets ==
Quassapaug Sailing Center has fleets of 420, Optimist and Snipe.

== Summer Camp ==
Currently, QSC operates a summer camp program from June to August for kids ages 9-16 to learn how to sail and explore nature. Camp "Sails & Trails" offers classes for 420 and Opti sailors along with a nature curriculum.
