= Mission Bay Yacht Club =

Yacht club in San Diego, California

Coordinates: 32.77904°N 117.2474°W

- Burgee
- Short name: MBYC
- Founded: 1927
- Location: 1215 El Carmel Place, San Diego, CA 92109
- Commodore: Kathy Dryden
- Website: www.mbyc.org

Mission Bay Yacht Club (MBYC) is a private yacht club in San Diego, California, on the west side of Mission Bay.

The club hosted the Snipe World Championships in 1997 and the club's Snipe fleet won the Commodore Hub E. Isaacks Trophy in 1969, 1971 and 1981.

== Fleets ==
The club is home of the following One-Design racing fleets:

- 505
- Finn
- Laser
- Lido 14
- Lightning
- MC Scow
- Multihull (A Class, F-18, Hobie, Nacra, Prindle)
- Sabot
- Snipe
- Soling
- Sunfish
- Thistle
- Victory
- 29er

== Junior Program Sailboats ==
- CFJ
- C420
- Naples Sabot
- O'PEN Skiff
- ILCA Dinghy (Laser)

== Sailors ==
Caleb Paine, Briana Provancha, Brian Vanderspek, Kyle Vanderspek, and Maureen McKinnon-Tucker are MBYC members.
