= Island Bay Yacht Club =

- Burgee
- Short name: IBYC
- Founded: 1935
- Location: 76 Yacht Club Road, Springfield, Illinois 62712
- Website: www.ibyconline.com

The Island Bay Yacht Club is a private yacht club located in Springfield, Illinois, on the shore of Lake Springfield.

== Fleets ==
The club is home of the following One-Design racing fleets:

- JY15
- C-Scow
- Sunfish
- Optimist
- J/22
- Laser
- Thistle

== Sailors ==
IBYC member Dave Chapin was 3 times world champion, after winning the Snipe Worlds in 1979 with Timothy Dixon, and the Sunfish Worlds in 1979 and 1981, besides several times national and North American champion in Laser, Sunfish, Snipe, 470 and Soling.
