= Jubilee Yacht Club =

Private yacht club in Massachusetts, United States

- Burgee
- Founded: 1896
- Location: 127 Water Street, Beverly, Massachusetts 01915
- Website: jubileeyacht.club

The Jubilee Yacht Club is a private yacht club located in Beverly, Massachusetts, United States.

== History ==
Incorporated in 1896, Jubilee Yacht Club is a private membership based organization with over 400 active members. Jubilee has an active cruising fleet, a busy regatta schedule, an active social calendar, and frequent fishing tournaments. The club is also a strong supporter of junior sailing.

== Fleets ==
The club is home of One-Design Snipe fleet number 554, J/24 Fleet 28, and J/105 Fleet 2.
