= Interlake (dinghy) =

Sailboat class

Development
- Designer: Francis Sweisguth
- Location: United States
- Year: 1933
- Builder: Customflex
- Role: One-design racer
- Name: Interlake

Boat
- Crew: two or three
- Displacement: 650 lb (295 kg)
- Draft: 4.58 ft (1.40 m) with centerboard down

Hull
- Type: Monohull
- Construction: Wood or fiberglass
- LOA: 18.00 ft (5.49 m)
- Beam: 6.25 ft (1.91 m)

Hull appendages
- Keel: centerboard
- Rudder: transom-mounted rudder

Rig
- Rig type: Bermuda rig

Sails
- Sailplan: Fractional rigged sloop
- Mainsail area: 125 sq ft (11.6 m^{2})
- Jib/genoa area: 50 sq ft (4.6 m^{2})
- Spinnaker area: 200 sq ft (19 m^{2})
- Total sail area: 175 sq ft (16.3 m^{2})

Racing
- D-PN: 89.9

The Interlake is an American planing sailing dinghy that was designed by Francis Sweisguth in 1932, as a one-design racer and first built in 1933.

The boat design was commissioned by the Sandusky Sailing Club. Sweisguth had already designed the Star keelboat and the Interlake was designed specifically for the conditions found on Lake Erie and in particular on Sandusky Bay.

== Production ==
For a time the design was built by Customflex, initially in Toledo, Ohio and later in Whitehouse, Ohio in the United States, but commercial production by Customflex has now ended. In 2023, licensing to build Interlakes was assumed by Beacon Composites in Creedmoor, North Carolina.

The boat's class club, the Interlake Sailing Class Association, also offers free plans for download in PDF format to allow amateur construction of the design.

== Design ==
The Interlake is a recreational sailboat, originally built predominantly of wood, fiberglass construction has been allowed by the class rules since 1955. The fiberglass boats have balsa cores for the hull and the decking. The boat has a fractional sloop rig, a spooned raked stem, an angled transom, a rounded, transom-hung, fiberglass rudder controlled by a tiller and a retractable fiberglass centerboard, operated by a winch with a 10:1 mechanical advantage. It displaces 650 lb (295 kg).

The boat has a draft of 4.58 ft (1.40 m) with the centerboard extended and 8 in (20 cm) with it retracted, allowing beaching or ground transportation on a trailer.

For sailing the design has foam flotation, mainsail boom roller reefing, a boom vang and mainsheet traveler with a bridle. The boat may be equipped with spinnaker of 200 sq ft (19 m^{2}) and hiking straps. The mast is supported by a forestay and shrouds, but no jumper stays or backstay. There is stowage provided under the foredeck.

The design has a Portsmouth Yardstick racing average handicap of 89.9 and is normally raced with a crew of two or three sailors.

== Operational history ==
The boat is supported by an active class club, the Interlake Sailing Class Association, which organizes races and offers free plans for the design.

In a 1994 review Richard Sherwood wrote that the "Interlake was designed for Sandusky Bay, Ohio, known for its short chop. She will plane fairly readily. The bow and sheer are classic, and the forward flare throws spray down, keeping her dry. She was originally built in wood, but fiberglass was allowed in 1955. Interlake is one of the older one-design classes in the United States."

== See also ==
- List of sailing boat types
