= North Cape Yacht Club =

Sports organization

- Burgee
- Founded: 1962
- Location: 11850 Toledo Beach Road, La Salle Township, Michigan 48145
- Website: ncyc.net

The North Cape Yacht Club is a private yacht club located in La Salle Township, Michigan, on the shore of Western Lake Erie.

== Regattas ==
The club hosted recently the following competitions:

- North American Championships
  - 2002 Thistle
  - 2004 Finn
  - 2011 Lighting and J/35
- National Championships
  - 2006 and 2010 Thistle
  - 2006 Hobie 33
  - 2007 Catalina 22
  - 2009 Highlander
  - 2010 A-Class light-weight catamarans
  - 2011 Snipe

== Sailors ==
NCYC is home of Anna Tunnicliffe, ICSA Women’s College Sailor of the Year in 2005, ISAF Rolex World Sailor of the Year in 2009 and 2011, and US Sailing’s Rolex Yachtswoman of the Year in 2008, 2009, 2010 and 2011.

== Awards ==
North Cape was honored by U.S. Sailing with the award of One-Design Yacht Club of the Year for 2011.
