= Atlanta Yacht Club =

Private yacht club in Acworth, Georgia

- Burgee
- Short name: AYC
- Founded: 1950 (75 years ago)
- Location: 7120 Yacht Club Drive Acworth, Georgia 30102 United States
- Commodore: Bryce Dryden, 2025
- Website: www.atlantayachtclub.org

The Atlanta Yacht Club is a private yacht club located in Acworth, Georgia (United States), on the southwest shore of Lake Allatoona.

One-Design racing began with a Penguin fleet the first season. The second season brought out five more organized fleets: Snipes, Thistles, Y-Flyers, a handicap fleet and a power boat fleet. Lasers and Optimists are the latest incorporations.

== Fleets and regattas ==
Current fleets at the club and their major regattas are:

- Y-Flyer fleet 1, Beers Regatta.
- Thistle fleet 48, Dixie Regatta.
- Snipe fleet 330, Halloween Regatta.

== Notable Sailors ==
Ted Turner and Tarasa Davis are among Atlanta Yacht Club's most famous sailors.
