= E Scow =

Sailboat class

Development
- Designer: Arnold Meyer Sr
- Location: United States
- Year: 1924
- Builders: Johnson Boat Works; Melges Performance Sailboats
- Role: One-design racer
- Name: E Scow

Boat
- Crew: 3-5
- Displacement: 965 lb (438 kg)
- Draft: 3.75 ft (1.14 m) with a centerboard down

Hull
- Type: monohull
- Construction: wood or fiberglass
- LOA: 28.00 ft (8.53 m)
- Beam: 6.75 ft (2.06 m)

Hull appendages
- Keel: twin centerboards
- Rudder: spade-type rudder

Rig
- Rig type: Bermuda rig

Sails
- Sailplan: fractional rigged sloop
- Mainsail area: 228 sq ft (21.2 m^{2})
- Jib/genoa area: 95 sq ft (8.8 m^{2})
- Spinnaker area: 550 sq ft (51 m^{2})
- Total sail area: 323 sq ft (30.0 m^{2})

Racing
- D-PN: 73.2

The E Scow is an American sailing dinghy that was designed by Arnold Meyer Sr as a one-design racer and first built in 1924.

== Production ==
The design was initially built by Johnson Boat Works in White Bear Lake, Minnesota United States, but that company closed in 1998 and production passed to Melges Performance Sailboats, who continue to build it.

== Design ==
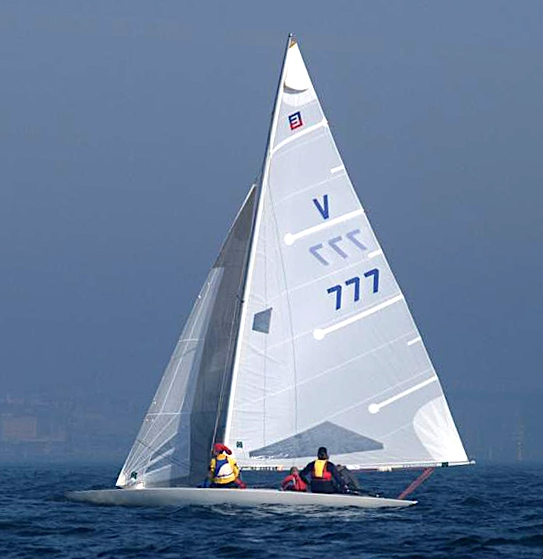
E Scow

The E Scow is a recreational sailboat, originally built of wood and now predominantly of fiberglass sandwich construction, with wood trim. It has a fractional sloop rig with either wooden or aluminum spars and running backstays. The forestay is attached well aft of the boat's bow. The hull is a scow design, with a vertical transom, a spade-type rudder controlled by a tiller and retractable dual centerboards (also called bilgeboards). It displaces 965 lb (438 kg).

The boat has a draft of 3.75 ft (1.14 m) with a centerboard extended. With the centerboards retracted it may be beached or transported on a trailer.

For sailing the design is equipped with jib and mainsail windows for visibility, plus automatic bailers. The mainsail is controlled by an outhaul, downhaul, Cunningham, boom vang and a leach cord. Under the class rules a jib luff wire and a downhaul are permitted. The boat also has a radiused mainsheet traveler and adjustable jib tracks. Only hiking straps are permitted.

The design has a Portsmouth Yardstick racing average handicap of 73.2 and is normally raced with a crew of three to five sailors.

== Operational history ==
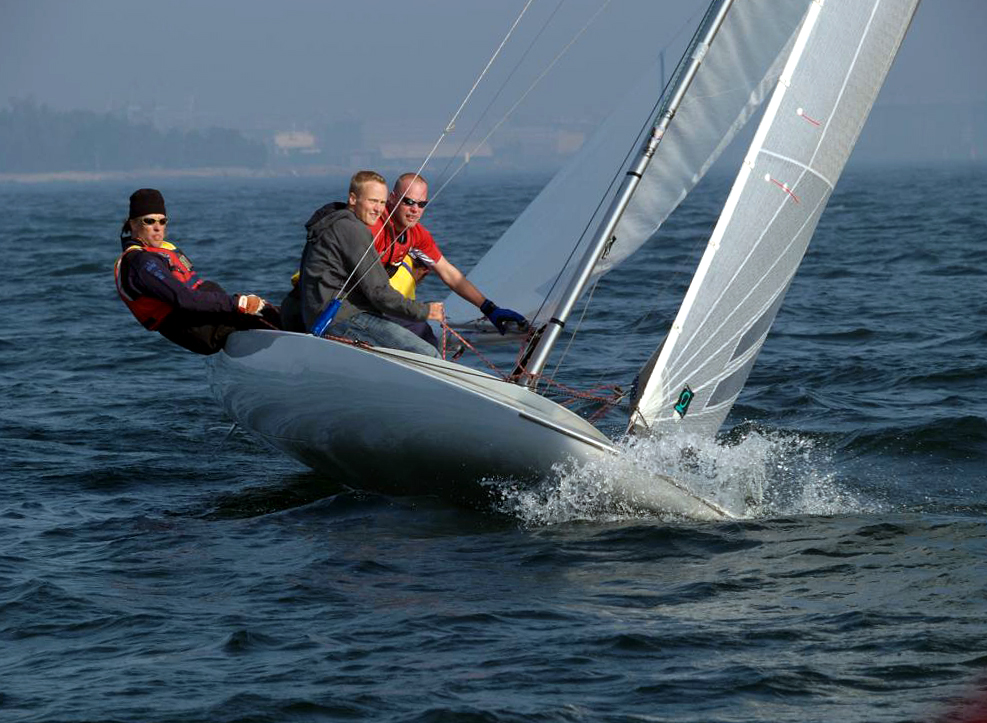
E Scow

The boat is supported by an active class club that organizes racing events, the National Class E Scow Association. By 1994 racing fleets were sailing in Texas, Colorado, Wisconsin, Minnesota, Michigan, New York and New Jersey.

In a 1994 review Richard Sherwood wrote, "this is a very fast and sophisticated boat with a long history of development. Scows probably evolved from sharpies, and the first scows were in evidence around 1895. E Scows were born at a meeting of the Inland Lake Yachting Association in 1923. Wood has been used for many years, but since 1976 FRP has predominated."

== See also ==
- List of sailing boat types
