= International class =

International class is a status that World Sailing grants, in exchange for fees of various kinds, to sailing boat classes that offers a "high standard of international competitive sailing" and satisfy a number of criteria regarding the number of boats of that class, their international distribution, and the rules, administration and operation of that class's class association. Some of them are an Olympic sailing class.

Classes are grouped following seven categories of sailing classes.

Official name	Details
Olympic	Olympic sailing classes
Centreboard	Dinghy sailing
Multihull	Multihull
Keelboat	Keelboat
Boards	Windsurfing
Yacht	Yacht
Radio	Radio-controlled boat
