= Burgee =

Flag of a sailing club or yacht club

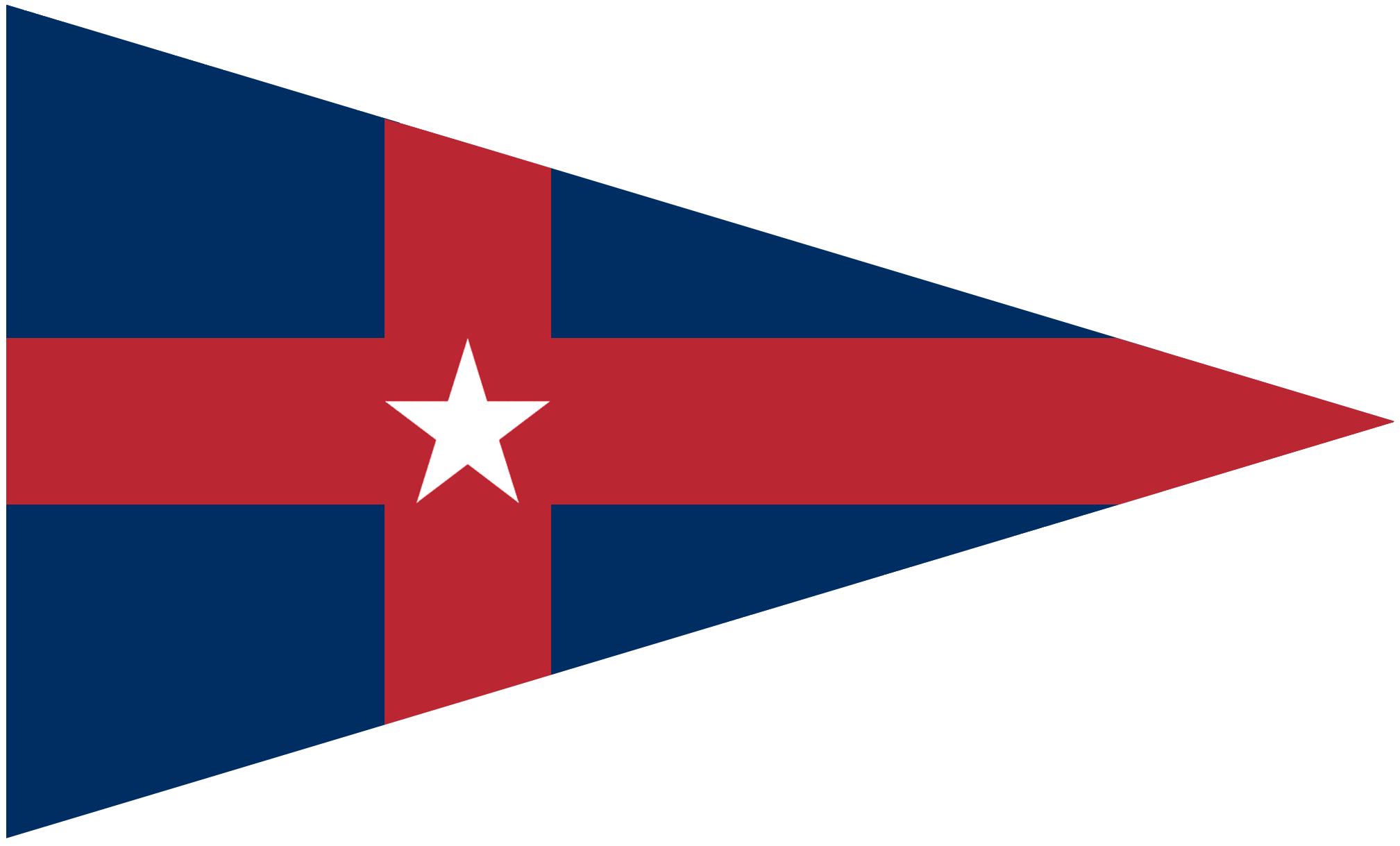
Burgee of the New York Yacht Club

A burgee (prob. ult. from French bourgeois, "owner (of a ship)") is a distinguishing flag, regardless of its shape, of a recreational boating organization. In most cases, they have the shape of a pennant.

== Etiquette ==
Yacht clubs and their members may fly their club's burgee while under way and at anchor, day or night. Sailing vessels may fly the burgee either from the main masthead or from a halyard under the lowermost starboard spreader. Most powerboats (i.e. those lacking any mast or having a single mast) fly the burgee off a short staff at the bow; two-masted power vessels fly the burgee at the foremast.

== Flag officers ==
The officers of a yacht club may fly various burgees appropriate to their rank: for example, the commodore may fly a swallow-tailed version of the club burgee (and the vice- and rear-commodores the same, but distinguished by the addition of one or two balls respectively at the canton). A past-commodore may also be given a distinctively-shaped flag.

== Personal burgees ==
Personal burgees are called private signals, and have also been designed and flown for over one hundred years. Much like club or burgees of rank, personal burgees must be distinct to the owner, but unlike the former, are often swallow-tailed.

== See also ==
- Broad pennant
- Civil ensign
- Courtesy flag
- Ensign
- Maritime flag
- Naval ensign
