= Open Snipe World Championship =

International sailing regatta

The Open Snipe World Championship is an annual international sailing regatta for Snipe (dinghy), organized by the host club on behalf of the Internal Snipe Class Association and recognized by World Sailing, the sports IOC recognized governing body. The trophy awarded for the World Championship is Commodore Hub E. Isaacks and O'Leary Trophies. The class got recognised status by World Sailing in 1958.

== Qualification ==
Entry is limited to the best national boats under an established quota based on the number of properly registered boat owners submitted to the SCIRA office by each National Secretary on the dues paid members for that year.

The following formula is used ("Registered Boats" must include: owner's name, address, fleet number and hull number to which the member has paid dues upon):

Average Number of Registered Boats for the past 2 years	Entries
1–5	1
6–15	2
16–30	3
31–50	4
51–100	5
101–200	6
201–300	7
300+	8

Additionally, the following skippers have an automatic entry to the championship that is not included in their home country's quota:

- Last World Champion, European Champion, Western Hemisphere & Orient Champion, Women's World Champion and first and second place in the Junior World Championship.
- Any former Commodore Hub E. Isaacks Trophy winning skipper.
- One additional skipper from the host country, providing that it does not have among its other representatives the Junior or Senior World, European or Western Hemisphere & Orient Champion.
- One additional skipper from the host fleet.

If the total entrants do not meet a total of 80 boats, those unassigned entry slots will be re-allocated to a pool of qualified entrants by SCIRA and the organizing authority.

== Editions ==
Host cities of the Open Snipe World Championship

Edition			Hosts			Sailor			Boats				Ref.
No	Day/Month	Year	Host club	City	Country	No.	Nat.	Cont.	Boats			Mix	Ref.
1	16-25 Oct	1959	Clube dos Jangadeiros	Porto Alegre	Brazil	32	16	4	16				
2	16-22 Sep.	1961	American Yacht Club (New York)	Rye	United States	36	18	4	18				
3	7-14 Sep	1963		Bendor Island	France	38	18	4	24				
4	8-14 Sep	1965	Real Club Náutico de Gran Canaria	Las Palmas	Spain	50	25	4	25				
5	5-10 Nov	1967	Coral Harbour Yacht Club	Nassau	Bahamas	48	24	4	24				
6	24 Oct -1 Nov	1969	Clube Náutico da Ilha de Luanda	Luanda	Angola	48	23	5	24				
7	8-15 Oct	1971	Iate Clube do Rio de Janeiro	Rio de Janeiro	Brazil	44	21	5	22				
8	12-20 Oct	1973	Real Club Mediterráneo	Málaga	Spain	84	22	5	42				
9	28Nov - 5Dec	1975	Yacht Club Punta del Este	Punta del Este	Uruguay	60	16	4	30	28	0	2	
10	21-28 Aug	1977	Skovshoved Sejlklub	Copenhagen	Denmark	74	20	4	37				
11	12-19 Aug	1979	Northern Yacht Club	North Sydney	Canada	60	17	4	30				
12	3-12 Sept	1981	Alamitos Bay Yacht Club	Long Beach	United States	72	19	4	36				
13	6-12 Sep	1983	Sport Club do Porto	Porto	Portugal	74	18	4	37				
14	23 Nov - 1 Dec	1985	Club Náutico San Isidro	Buenos Aires	Argentina	70	19	4	35				
15	31Aug - 4Sep	1987	Société des Régates Rochelaises	La Rochelle	France	98	16	4	49				
16	22-28 Aug	1989	Saga Prefecture Yacht Harbor	Karatsu	Japan	88	15	4	44	38	2	4	
17	2-10 Aug	1991	Tønsberg Seilforening	Tønsberg	Norway	100	20	4	50				
18	Nov	1993	Clube dos Jangadeiros	Porto Alegre	Brazil	92	17	4	46	40	0	6	
19	3-9 Jul	1995	Club Nautico di Rimini	Rimini	Italy	96	18	4	48	35	0	13	
20	13-18 Sep	1997	Mission Bay Yacht Club	San Diego	United States	104	20	4	52	39	0	13	
21	3-11 Sep	1999	Real Club de Regatas de Santiago de la Ribera	Santiago de la Ribera	Spain	114	21	4	57	47	1	9	
22	24 Nov - 2 Dec	2001	Yacht Club Punta del Este	Punta del Este	Uruguay	122	19	4	61	53	0	8	
23	2-9 Aug	2003	Borstahusens Segelsällskaps	Borstahusen	Sweden	116	18	4	58	40	0	18	
24	23-30 Jul	2005	Kaiyoh Yacht Harbor	Gamagōri	Japan	102	15	4	51	39	0	12	
25	8-15 Sep	2007	Clube de Vela Atlântico	Porto	Portugal	114	17	4	57	47	0	10	
26	7-11 Sep	2009	San Diego Yacht Club	San Diego	United States	98	18	4	49	34	0	15	
27	6-13 Aug	2011	Royal Danish Yacht Club & Espergærde Sejlklub	Rungsted	Denmark	118	17	4	59	37	1	21	
28	21-29 Sep	2013	Iate Clube do Rio de Janeiro	Rio de Janeiro	Brazil	154	15	4	77	66	0	11	
29	12-26 Sep	2015	Circolo della Vela Talamone	Talamone	Italy	166	18	4	83	61	2	20	
30	5-11 Aug	2017	Real Club Náutico de La Coruña	A Coruña	Spain	170	18	4	85	62	0	23	
31	8-12 Oct	2019	Lars Grael Sailing School	Ilhabela	Brazil	140	11	4	70	49	1	20	
32	18-25 Aug	2022	Clube Naval de Cascais	Cascais	Portugal	170	19	4	85	60	1	24	
33	24 Oct - 2 Nov	2024	Yacht Club Argentino	Buenos Aires	Argentina	168	12	4	84	59	0	25	
34	19-26 Sept.	2026	Club Marítimo de Mahón	Mahón	Spain	176	21	5	88	58	0	30	

== Medalists ==
Year	Gold	Silver	Bronze	Ref.
1946 Chautauqua Lake Yacht Club, New York	United States; Bob Davis; Ken Davis	United States; Victor Larson	United States; Bob Carrick	
1947 Société Nautique de Genève, Geneva	United States; Ted A. Wells; Art Lippitt	Argentina; Jorge Brauer; Roberto García	Norway; Felix V. Roznieki	
1948 Real Club Náutico de Palma, Palma de Mallorca	Argentina; Carlos Vilar Castex; Jorge Vilar Castex	Spain; Antonio Pérez; Antonio Ferrer	Portugal; Antonio Jose Vilardebó; Jaime Sacadura	
1949 Larchmont Yacht Club, New York	United States; Ted A. Wells; Marjorie A. Wells	Argentina; Jorge Vilar Castex; Carlos Vilar Castex	Norway; Per Skjønberg	
1951 Miramar Yacht Club, Habana	Argentina; Jorge Vilar Castex; Carlos Vilar Castex	United States; Francis Seavy	Cuba; Jorge Mantilla	
1953 Société des Régates, Monaco	Portugal; Antonio José Conde; Fernando Lima	United States; Tom Frost	Cuba; Clemente Inclan	
1955 Real Club Marítimo de Santander, Santander	Italy; Mario Capio; Lorenzo Podestà	Cuba; Jorge Mantilla	Portugal; Helder Soares	
1957 Clube Naval de Cascais, Cascais	Spain; Juan Manuel Alonso-Allende; Gabriel Laiseca	Switzerland; Raymond Fragniere	United States; Fred Schenck	
1959	Denmark; Paul Elvstrøm; Erik Johansen	United States; Gonzalo Diaz	Japan; Masyuki Ishii	
1961	Brazil; Axel Schmidt; Erik Schmidt	United States; Harry Levinson; Alan Levinson	Spain; Gonzalo Fernández de Córdoba; Luis Triay	
1963	Brazil; Axel Schmidt; Erik Schmidt	Brazil; Reinaldo Conrad	Bahamas; Basil Kelly	
1965	Brazil; Axel Schmidt; Erik Schmidt	United States; Harry Levinson; Alan Levinson	Puerto Rico; Garry Hoyt; Hovey Freeman	
1967	Brazil; Nelson Piccolo; Carlos Henrique	United States; Earl Elms; David Ullman	Yugoslavia; Antun Grego; Simo Nikolić	
1969	United States; Earl Elms; Mike Shear	Brazil; Reinaldo Conrad; Mário Buckup	Portugal; Paulo Santos; Fernando da Silva	
1971	United States; Earl Elms; Craig Martin	Brazil; Ralph Conrad; João Pedro Reinhard	Spain; Félix Gancedo; Antonio Burgos	
1973	Spain; Félix Gancedo; Rafael Parga	Denmark; Per Brodsted; Steen Brodsted	Sweden; Erik Thosell; Claes Nordwall	
1975	Spain; Félix Gancedo; Manuel Bernal	United States; Agustín Diaz; Gonzalo Diaz	Finland; Peter Bjurström; Hakan Bjurström	
1977	Brazil; Boris Ostergren; Ernesto Neugebauer	United States; Tom Nute; Randy Smith	Brazil; Marco Aurélio; Luiz Pejnovic	
1979	United States; Dave Chapin; Tim Dixon	United States; Mark Reynolds; DeAnn Wright	Brazil; Bóris Ostergren; Ernesto Neugebauer	
1981	United States; Jeff Lenhart; Patrick Muglia	Spain; Félix Gancedo; Carlos Llamas	Brazil; Torben Grael; Lars Grael	
1983	Brazil; Torben Grael; Lars Grael	United States; Craig Martin; Kenyon Martin	Spain; Jorge Haenelt; Laureano Wizner	
1985	Argentina; Santiago Lange; Miguel Saubidet	Argentina; Johnny MacCall; Sergio Ripoll	Japan; Miyuca Kai; Akio Kaneko	
1987	Brazil; Torben Grael; Marcelo Maia	Argentina; Santiago Lange; Miguel Saubidet	Uruguay; Horacio Carabelli; Luis Chiapparo	
1989	Uruguay; Ricardo Fabini; Harol Meerhoff	Brazil; Torben Grael; Marcelo Maia	Japan; Nobuhiro Utada; Noriaki Sugitani	
1991	Argentina; Axel Roger; Jorge Quiroga	Finland; Hakan Bjurström; Rikard Bjurström	Norway; Birger Jansen; Janett Krefting	
1993	Argentina; Santiago Lange; Mariano Parada	Brazil; George Nehm; Fernando Krahe	Argentina; Guillermo Parada; Sergio Ripole	
1995	Argentina; Santiago Lange; Mariano Parada	Argentina; Guillermo Parada; Gonzalo Martínez	United States; Douglas Hart; John Rogers	
1997	Brazil; Mauricio Oliveira; Eduardo Neves	Brazil; Alexandre Paradeda; Flavio Fernandes	Russia; Andrey Kirilyuk; Galina Kirilyuk	
1999	Cuba; Nélido Manso; Octavio Lorenzo	Brazil; André Fonseca; Rodrigo Duarte	Spain; Fernando Rita; Javier Sintes	
2001	Brazil; Alexandre Paradeda; Eduardo Paradeda	Brazil; Federico Vasconcellos; Felipe Vasconcellos	Argentina; Christian Noé; Alejandro Noé	
2003	United States; Augie Diaz; John Rogers	United States; George Szabo; Brian Janney	Spain; Francisco Sánchez Ferrer; Marina Sánchez Ferrer	
2005	United States; Augie Diaz; Pamela Kelly	Japan; Shigeru Matsuzaki; Hiroyuki Sugiura	Uruguay; Pablo Defazio; Eduardo Medici	
2007	United States; Tomas Hornos; Enrique Quintero	Japan; Kenji Abe; Hiroshi Yamachica	United States; Peter Commette; Sheehan Commette	
2009	Brazil; Bruno Amorim; Dante Bianchi	Spain; Gustavo del Castillo; Felipe Llinares	United States; Ernesto Rodriguez; Megan Place	
2011	Brazil; Alexandre do Amaral; Gabriel Borges	Brazil; Alexandre Paradeda; Gabriel Kieling	Brazil; Bruno Amorim; Dante Bianchi	
2013	Brazil; Bruno Amorim; Dante Bianchi	Brazil; Mário C. Urban; Rafael Sapucaia	Brazil; Alexandre Paradeda; Gabriel Kieling	
2015	Brazil; Mateus Tavares; Gustavo Carvalho	Argentina; Luis Soubié; Diego Lipszyc	Spain; Álvaro Martinez; Gabriel Utrera	
2017	Puerto Rico; Raúl Ríos; Mac Agnese	Spain; Gustavo del Castillo; Rafael del Castillo	Spain; Rayco Tabares; Gonzalo Morales	
2019	Brazil; Henrique Haddad; Gustavo Nascimento	Brazil; Alexandre Paradeda; Gabriel Kieling	Spain; Damian Borrás; Jordi Triay	
2022	Spain; Alfredo González; Cristian Sánchez	Brazil; Alexandre Paradeda; Gabriel Kieling	United States; Ernesto Rodriguez; Kathleen Tocke	
2024	Argentina; Julio Alsogaray; Malena Sciarra	United States; Ernesto Rodriguez; Taylor Scheuermann	Brazil; Bernardo Peixoto; Gustavo Baiano	
2026	United States; Ernesto Rodríguez; Taylor Scheuermann	Argentina; Julio Alsogaray; Malena Sciarra	Spain; Alfredo González; Cristian Sánchez	

== Early International Regattas ==
Year	Gold	Silver	Bronze	Ref.
1934 New Rochelle Yacht Club, New Rochelle	United States; William E. Bracey	United States; F.M. Ellsworth	United States; Karl Haimerl	
1935 Dallas Sailing Club, Dallas	United States; Perry Richardson Bass; Jimmie Maxwell	United States; H.S. Thompson	United States; William E. Bracey	
1936 Oshkosh Yacht Club, Wisconsin	United States; Philip Benson, Jr. Bill Benson	United States; George Q. McGown	United States; A.M. Deacon	
1937 Sea Cliff Yacht Club, New York	United States; Authur M. Deacon	United States; William Leo	United States; Cort Ames	
1938 Wawasee Yacht Club, Indiana	United States; Charles Gabor	United States; Cleo Payne	United States; Henry Schuette	
1939 Los Angeles Yacht Club, Los Angeles	United States; Walter Hall	United States; Darby Metcalf	United States; Ray Hopkins	
1940 Canandaigua Yacht Club, New York	United States; Darby Metcalf; Fred Schenck	United States; Ted Varalyay; L. Varalyay	United States; Don Cochran	
1941 Fort Worth Boat Club, Texas	United States; Darby Metcalf; George Lounsberry	United States; Steve Bechtel, Jr.	United States; Ted Varalyay	
1942 Crescent Sail Yacht Club, Michigan	United States; Clifford Heinzerling; Ralph Heinzerling	United States; Gail DeJarnette	United States; Ted A. Wells	
1945 Chicago Corinthian Yacht Club, Illinois	United States; Bob White; Betty White	United States; Don Cochran	United States; Don Borough	

== Trophies ==
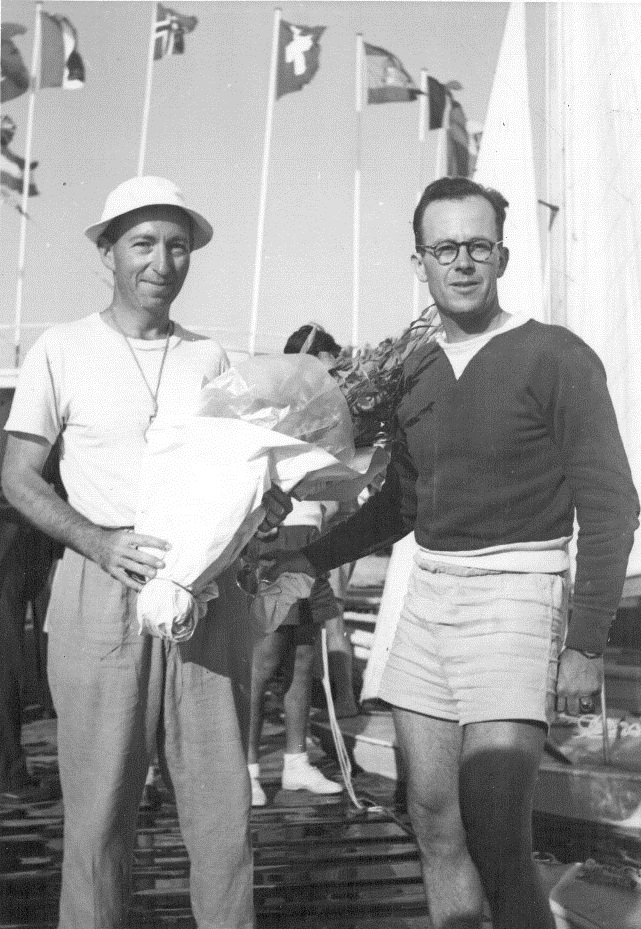
Ted Wells with Art Lippitt after winning the 1947 World Championship at the Société Nautique de Genève.

Commodore Hub E. Isaacks and O'Leary Trophies are the main trophies awarded at the Open Snipe World Championship. The Commodore Hub E. Isaacks Trophy is awarded to the fleet of the winning skipper, while the O'Leary Trophy is awarded to the person who crews for the winning skipper in the majority of races sailed in the World Championships.

Another two perpetual trophies are presented in the championship: The Earl Elms Perpetual Trophy is awarded to the fleet of the winning skipper of the final race of the World Championship, and the Bibi Juetz Perpetual Trophy to the highest placing mixed team.

This competition is held every two years in the odd numbered years since the year 1949. Previously, it was held every year since 1934. It is named after Hub E. Isaacs, of Dallas, Texas, first commodore of the Snipe Class International Racing Association (SCIRA), who donated the trophy.

The O'Leary Trophy is awarded since 1961 and it was donated by Cathy O'Leary y Helen O'Leary Hall.

Year	Skipper	O'Leary Trophy Crew	Commodore Hub E. Isaacks Trophy	
Year	Skipper	O'Leary Trophy Crew	Skipper's Fleet	Club
1934	William E. Bracey		(United States) 1	Dallas Sailing Club
1935	Perry Bass	Jimmie Maxwell^	(United States) 34	Wichita Falls Sailing Club
1936	Philip A. Benson, Jr.	Bill Benson^	(United States) 4	Sea Cliff Yacht Club
1937	Arthur M. Deacon		(United States) 3-Western Long Island Sound	Horseshoe Harbor Yacht Club
1938	Charles Gabor		(United States) 10	Lake Mohawk Yacht Club
1939	Walter Hall	Bob Hall^	(United States) 62	Lake Merritt Sailing Club
1940	Darby Metcalf	Fred Schenck^	(United States) 90	Los Angeles Yacht Club
1941	Darby Metcalf	George Lounsberry^	(United States) 90	Los Angeles Yacht Club
1942	Charles Heinzerling	Ralph Heinzerling^	(United States) 112	Lake Lackawanna Yacht Club
1945	Bob White	Betty White^	(United States) 94-Newport Harbor	Balboa Yacht Club
1946	Bob Davis	Ken Davis^	(United States) 94-Newport Harbor	Balboa Yacht Club
1947	Ted A. Wells	Art Lippitt^	(United States) 93-Wichita	Wichita Sailing Club
1948	Carlos Vilar	Jorge Vilar^	(Argentina) 274	Club Náutico San Isidro
1949	Ted A. Wells	Marjorie A. Wells^	(United States) 93-Wichita	Wichita Sailing Club
1951	Jorge Vilar	Carlos Vilar^	(Argentina) 274	Club Náutico San Isidro
1953	Antonio José Conde Martins	Fernando Lima Bello^	(Portugal) 216-Centro de Vela da	Mocidade Portuguesa
1955	Mario Capio	Lorenzo Podestà^	(Italy) 404-Spalturno	
1957	Juan Manuel Alonso-Allende	Gabriel Laiseca^	(Spain) 151	Real Sporting Club
1959	Paul Elvstrom	Erik Johansen^	(Denmark) 585	Hellerup Sejlklub
1961	Axel Schmidt	Eric Schmidt	(Brazil) 477-Saco de São Francisco	Rio Yacht Club
1963	Axel Schmidt	Eric Schmidt	(Brazil) 477-Saco de São Francisco	Rio Yacht Club
1965	Axel Schmidt	Eric Schmidt	(Brazil) 477-Saco de São Francisco	Rio Yacht Club
1967	Nelson Piccolo	C. Henrique de Lorenzi	(Brazil) 426-Rio Grande do Sul	Clube dos Jangadeiros
1969	Earl Elms	Mike Shear	(United States) 495-Mission Bay	Mission Bay Yacht Club
1971	Earl Elms	Craig Martin	(United States) 495-Mission Bay	Mission Bay Yacht Club
1973	Félix Gancedo	Rafael Parga	(Spain) 146	Real Club Mediterráneo
1975	Félix Gancedo	Manuel Bernal	(Spain) 146	Real Club Mediterráneo
1977	Boris Ostergren	Ernesto Neugebauer	(Brazil) 427-Cristal	Veleiros do Sul
1979	Dave Chapin	Tim Dixon	(United States) 91	Island Bay Yacht Club
1981	Jeff Lenhart	Patrick Muglia	(United States) 495-Mission Bay	Mission Bay Yacht Club
1983	Torben Grael	Lars Grael	(Brazil) 477-Saco de São Francisco	Rio Yacht Club
1985	Santiago Lange	Miguel Saubidet	(Argentina) 274	Club Náutico San Isidro
1987	Torben Grael	Marcelo Maia	(Brazil) 477-Saco de São Francisco	Rio Yacht Club
1989	Ricardo Fabini	Harol Meerhoff	(Uruguay) 506	Yacht Club Uruguayo
1991	Axel Rodger	Jorge Quiroga	(Argentina) 737	Club Universitario de Buenos Aires
1993	Santiago Lange	Mariano Parada	(Argentina) 274	Club Náutico San Isidro
1995	Santiago Lange	Mariano Parada	(Argentina) 274	Club Náutico San Isidro
1997	Mauricio Oliveira	Eduardo Neves	(Brazil) 159-Rio de Janeiro	Iate Clube do Rio de Janeiro
1999	Nélido Manso	Octavio Lorenzo	(Cuba) 22-La Habana	
2001	Alexandre Paradeda	Eduardo Paradeda	(Brazil) 426-Rio Grande do Sul	Clube dos Jangadeiros
2003	Augie Diaz	Jon Rogers	(United States) 196	Coconut Grove Sailing Club
2005	Augie Diaz	Pamela Kelly	(United States) 196	Coconut Grove Sailing Club
2007	Tomas Hornos	Enrique Quintero	(United States) 244	Cottage Park Yacht Club
2009	Bruno Amorim	Dante Bianchi	(Brazil) 159-Rio de Janeiro	Iate Clube do Rio de Janeiro
2011	Alexandre do Amaral	Gabriel Borges	(Brazil) 368-Baia de Guanabara	Clube de Regatas Guanabara
2013	Bruno Amorim	Dante Bianchi	(Brazil) 159-Rio de Janeiro	Iate Clube do Rio de Janeiro
2015	Mateus Tavares	Gustavo Carvalho	(Brazil) 662-Salvador de Bahia	Yacht Clube da Bahía
2017	Raúl Ríos	Max Agnese	(Puerto Rico) 591	Club Náutico de San Juan
2019	Henrique Haddad	Gustavo Nascimento	(Brazil) 159-Rio de Janeiro	Iate Clube do Rio de Janeiro
2022	Alfredo González González	Cristian Sánchez Barreto	(Spain) 623	Real Club Náutico de Arrecife
2024	Julio Alsogaray	Malena Sciarra	(Argentina) 575	Club Náutico San Pedro
2026	Ernesto Rodríguez	Taylor Scheuermann	(United States) 7	independent

^Crew did not receive the O'Leary Trophy because it was not established yet

== See also ==
- Female Snipe World Championship
- Masters Snipe World Championship
- Youth Snipe World Championship
