= Snipe Western Hemisphere and Asia Championship =

International sailing regatta

The Snipe Western Hemisphere and Asia Championship is an international sailing regatta in the Snipe class. The fleet of winning skipper is awarded the Hayward Western Hemisphere Trophy, donated by Commodore John T. Hayward, of Tulsa, Oklahoma. 3 races shall constitute a regatta. It was named Snipe Western Hemisphere & Orient Championship until 2023.

It is sailed every two years (even years), on alternate years with the World Championship, since 1950. The Western Hemisphere & Orient Championship and the European Championship are the main competitions after the Worlds.

Five qualified teams from each county in the Western Hemisphere and Japan, the current champion, the current world champion (providing it represents a WH&O nation), the prior year North American and Orient champions (providing each represents a Western Hemisphere and Orient nation) and the current year South American champion are entitled to compete.

== Winners ==
Year	Host	Skipper	Crew	Fleet
1950	(Cuba) Miramar Yacht Club	Clemente Inclán	Carlos Inclan	(Cuba) Miramar Yacht Club
1952	(United States) Clearwater Yacht Club	Ted A. Wells	Charles Henry	(United States) Wichita Sailing Club
1954	(Cuba) Miramar Yacht Club	Terry Whittemore	Bob Whittemore	(United States) Lake Quassapaug Yacht Club
1956	(Bermuda) Spanish Point Boat Club; Sandys Boat Club; St. George's Dinghy & Sports Club	Penny Simmons	John Shirkey	(Bermuda) Spanish Point Boat Club
1958	(The Bahamas) Royal Nassau Sailing Club	Bernard Hayward	Charles Brown	(Bermuda) St. George's Dinghy & Sports Club
1960	(Argentina) Club Náutico San Isidro	Bernard Hayward	James Amos	(Bermuda) St. George's Dinghy & Sports Club
1962	(Brazil) late Clube do Brasilia	Reinaldo Conrad	Ralph Conrad	(Brazil) Yacht Club Santo Amaro
1964	(Canada) Oakville Yacht Squadron	Reinaldo Conrad	Ralph Conrad	(Brazil) Yacht Club Santo Amaro
1966	(Uruguay) Yacht Club Uruguayo	Ralph Conrad	João Pedro Reinhart	(Brazil) Yacht Club Santo Amaro
1968	(United States) Florida Yacht Club	Takao Ninomiya	Hideo Kawamura	(Japan)
1970	(Bermuda) Spanish Point Boat Club	Gary Boswell	Margaret Boswell	(United States) Austin Yacht Club
1972	(Colombia) Club Naval de Oficiales en Cartagena	Augie Diaz	Gonzalo E. Diaz	(United States) Coconut Grove Sailing Club
1974	(Argentina) Club Náutico San Isidro	Jeff Lenhard	Donald Krebs	(United States) Mission Bay Yacht Club
1976	(Canada) Northern Yacht Club	Marco Aurelio Paradeda	Luis Pajnovic	(Brazil) Clube dos Jangadeiros
1978	(Brazil) Clube de Campo de São Paulo	Ivan Pimentel	Carlos Dohnert	(Brazil) Iate Clube do Rio de Janeiro
1980	(Uruguay) Yacht Club Uruguayo	Dave Chapin	Scott Young	(United States) Island Bay Yacht Club
1982	(The Bahamas) Royal Nassau Sailing Club	Dave Chapin	Tim Dixon	(United States) Island Bay Yacht Club
1984	(Paraguay) Lago Azul Country Club	John MacCall	Sergio Ripol	(Argentina) Club Náutico Olivos
1986	(Japan) Enoshima Yacht Club	Santiago Lange	Miguel Saubidet	(Argentina) Club Náutico San Isidro
1988	(Bermuda) Spanish Point Boat Club	Ivan Pimentel	Luis Pejnovic	(Brazil) Iate Clube do Rio de Janeiro
1990	(Argentina) Club Náutico Olivos	Ricardo Fabini	Harold Meerhoff	(Uruguay) Yacht Club Uruguayo
1992	(The Bahamas) Royal Nassau Sailing Club	John Keane	Ted Keenan	(United States) Harvard University Yacht Club
1994	(Uruguay) Yacht Club Uruguayo	Guillermo Parada	Gonzalo Martinez	(Argentina) Yacht Club Argentino
1996	(United States) Larchmont Yacht Club	Mauricio Santa Cruz Oliveira	Eduardo Neves	(Brazil) Iate Clube do Rio de Janeiro
1998	(Japan) Enoshima Yacht Club	Eduardo Santambrogio	Gonzalo Martinez	(Argentina) Yacht Club Argentino
2000	(Argentina) Club de Velas de Rosario	Frederico Vasconcellos	Felipe Vasconcellos	(Brazil) Clube dos Caiçaras
2002	(United States) Alamitos Bay Yacht Club	Augie Diaz	Jon Rogers	(United States) Coconut Grove Sailing Club
2004	(Brazil) Iate Clube do Rio de Janeiro	Alexandre Dias Paradeda	Eduardo Paradeda	(Brazil) Clube dos Jangadeiros
2006	(United States) Coconut Grove Sailing Club	Pablo Defazio	Eduardo Medici	(Uruguay) Yacht Club Uruguayo
2008	(Uruguay) Yacht Club Punta del Este	Bruno Bethlem de Amorim	Dante Bianchi	(Brazil) Iate Clube do Rio de Janeiro
2010	(Canada) Buffalo Canoe Club	Ernesto Rodriguez	Mary Hall	(United States) Miami
2012	(Uruguay) Yacht Club Punta del Este	Bruno Bethlem de Amorim	Dante Bianchi	(Brazil) Iate Clube do Rio de Janeiro
2014	(United States) San Diego Yacht Club	Raúl Ríos	Fernando Monllor	(Puerto Rico) Club Náutico de San Juan
2016	(Brazil) Iate Clube do Rio de Janeiro	Édgar Diminich	Jaime Flores	(Ecuador) Salinas Yacht Club
2018	(Argentina) Club Náutico Olivos	Ernesto Rodriguez	Kathleen Tocke	(United States) Miami
2021	(United States) Cottage Park Yacht Club	Augie Diaz	Bárbara Brotons	(United States) Coconut Grove Sailing Club
2023	(Chile) Cofradía Náutica del Pacífico	Matías Seguel	Constanza Seguel	(Chile) Cofradía Náutica del Pacífico
2025	(United States) San Diego Yacht Club	Justin Callahan	Trevor Davis	(United States) Biscayne Bay Yacht Club
