= Snipe South American Championship =

The Snipe South American Championship is the annual South American Championship for sailing in the Snipe class.

The regatta is open to Snipe Class International Racing Association (SCIRA) registered boats and class member skippers and crews. The trophy is a donation of SCIRA Paraguay, and 3 races constitute a regatta with nine or eleven races scheduled, depending on local conditions.

It is held every year alternating venues around any country in South America.

== Winners ==
Year	Host	Skipper	Crew	Fleet
1975	Yacht Club de Chile	Paulo Renato Paradeda	Marcos Grossner	(Brazil) Clube dos Jangadeiros
1979	(Paraguay) Yacht Club Ypacaraí	Pedro Sisti	Miguel Costa	(Argentina) Club Náutico San Isidro
1980	(Argentina) Club Náutico San Isidro	Ivan Pimentel	José Barcello Díaz	(Brazil) Iate Clube do Rio de Janeiro
1981^	(Uruguay) Yacht Club Punta del Este	Augie Diaz	Gonzalo Diaz	(United States) Coconut Grove Sailing Club
1982	(Uruguay) Yacht Club Uruguayo	Julio Labandeira	Sergio Ripoll	(Argentina) Yacht Club Olivos
1983	(Paraguay) Yacht Club Ypacaraí	Ivan Pimentel	Marcelo Maia	(Brazil) Iate Clube do Rio de Janeiro
1984	(Brazil) Veleiros do Sul	Carlos Alberto Wanderley, Junior	Jean Pierre Zarovk	(Brazil) Yacht Club Santo Amaro
1985	(Uruguay) Yacht Club Punta del Este	Santiago Lange	Miguel Saubidet	(Argentina) Yacht Club Argentino
1986	(Argentina) Club Náutico Córdoba	Julio Labandeira	Arrian Pis	(Argentina) Yacht Club Olivos
1987	(Paraguay) Yacht Club Ypacaraí	Hilton Piccolo	Ralph Hennig	(Brazil) Clube dos Jangadeiros
1988	(Brazil) Iate Clube de Santa Catarina	Marcelo Gusmão Reitz	Alexandre Takase	(Brazil) Iate Clube de Santa Catarina
1989	(Uruguay) Yacht Club Uruguayo	John MacCall	G. Ramirez	(Argentina) Club Náutico Olivos
1990	(Argentina) Yacht Club Olivos	Horacio Carabelli	Luis Chiaparro	(Uruguay) Yacht Club Uruguayo
1991	(Brazil) Clube dos Jangadeiros	George Nehm	Henrique Bergallo	(Brazil) Clube dos Jangadeiros
1992	(Uruguay) Yacht Club Punta del Este	Marco Aurélio Paradeda	Alexandre Paradeda	(Brazil) Clube dos Jangadeiros
1993	(Argentina) Club De Veleros Barlovento	Ricardo Fabini	Ivan Guicheff	(Uruguay) Yacht Club Uruguayo
1994	(Paraguay) Club Náutico San Bernardino	Ricardo Paradeda	Eduardo Paradeda	(Brazil) Clube dos Jangadeiros
1995	(Brazil) Veleiros do Sul	Alexandre Paradeda	Flávio Só Fernandes	(Brazil) Clube dos Jangadeiros
1996	(Uruguay) Yacht Club Uruguayo	Ricardo Fabini	Ignacio Saralegui	(Uruguay) Yacht Club Uruguayo
1997	(Argentina) Club Náutico Córdoba	Cristian Noé	Nicolás Méndez	(Argentina) Club de Velas Rosario
1998	(Uruguay) Yacht Club Punta del Este	Ricardo Fabini	Ignacio Saralegui	(Uruguay) Yacht Club Uruguayo
1999	(Chile) Club de Yates Algarrobo	Cristian Noé	Diego Rudoy	(Argentina) Club de Velas Rosario
2000	(Brazil) Iate Clube do Rio de Janeiro	Bruno Bethlem de Amorim	Maxim Wengert	(Brazil) Iate Clube do Rio de Janeiro
2001	(Argentina) Tucumán Yacht Club	Cristian Noé	Alejandro Noé	(Argentina) Club de Velas Rosario
2002	(Paraguay) Club Náutico San Bernardino	Santiago Silveira	Nicolás Shabán	(Uruguay) Yacht Club Punta del Este
2003	(Uruguay) Yacht Club Punta del Este	Santiago Silveira	Nicolás Shabán	(Uruguay) Yacht Club Punta del Este
2004	(Brazil) Clube dos Jangadeiros	Santiago Silveira	Diego Stafani	(Uruguay) Yacht Club Punta del Este
2005	(Chile) Club de Yates Algarrobo	Santiago Silveira	Diego Stafani	(Uruguay) Yacht Club Punta del Este
2006	(Argentina) Club Náutico Córdoba	Adrián Marcatelli	Francisco Bonaventura	(Argentina) Club de Regatas San Nicolás
2007	(Uruguay) Yacht Club Punta del Este	Carlos Henrique Wanderley	Eduardo Chaves	(Brazil) Yacht Club Santo Amaro
2008	(Brazil) Iate Clube de Santa Catarina	Carlos Henrique Wanderley	Richard Zietemann	(Brazil) Yacht Club Santo Amaro
2009	(Argentina) Yacht Club Olivos	Alexandre Paradeda	Gabriel Kieling	(Brazil) Clube dos Jangadeiros
2010	(Chile) Club de Yates Algarrobo	Rafael Gagliotti	Henrique Wisniewski	(Brazil) Iate Clube de Santos
2011	(Argentina) Club Náutico Córdoba	Rafael Gagliotti	Henrique Wisniewski	(Brazil) Iate Clube de Santos
2012	(Ecuador) Manta Yacht Club	Alexandre Tinoco do Amaral	Gabriel Borges	(Brazil) Clube de Regatas Guanabara
2013	(Uruguay) Yacht Club Uruguayo	Mário Tinoco do Amaral	Alexandre Muto	(Brazil) Clube de Regatas Guanabara
2014	(Brazil) Clube dos Jangadeiros	Alexandre Paradeda	Gabriel Kieling	(Brazil) Clube dos Jangadeiros
2015	(Argentina) Club Náutico Mar del Plata	Luis Soubie	Diego Lipszyc	(Argentina) Yacht Club Olivos
2016	(Brazil) Iate Clube do Espírito Santo	Rafael Martins	Juliana Duque	(Brazil) Yacht Clube da Bahía
2017	(Argentina) Club Náutico San Isidro	Luis Soubie	Diego Lipszyc	(Argentina) Yacht Club Olivos
2018	(Brazil) Clube dos Jangadeiros	Bruno Bethlem de Amorim	Rodrigo Lins	(Brazil) Iate Clube do Rio de Janeiro
2019	(Chile) Cofradía Náutica del Pacífico	Matías Seguel	María Jesús Seguel	(Chile) Cofradía Náutica del Pacífico
2022	(Argentina) Yacht Club Olivos	Luis Soubie	Diego Lipszyc	(Argentina) Yacht Club Olivos
2023^	(Uruguay) Yacht Club Uruguayo	Raúl Ríos	Juan Cruz Garcia Quiroga	(Puerto Rico) Club Náutico de San Juan
2024	(Brazil) Veleiros do Sul	Julio Alsogaray	Malena Sciarra	(Argentina) Club Náutico San Pedro
2025	(Chile) Club de Yates Caldera	Augie Diaz	Madeline Baldridge	(United States) Coconut Grove Sailing Club

- ^In 1981, 2023 and 2025 the winning team was not from South America, as the Deed of Gift leaves the competition open to boats from any country.
