= Alexandre Paradeda =

Brazilian sailor (born 1972)

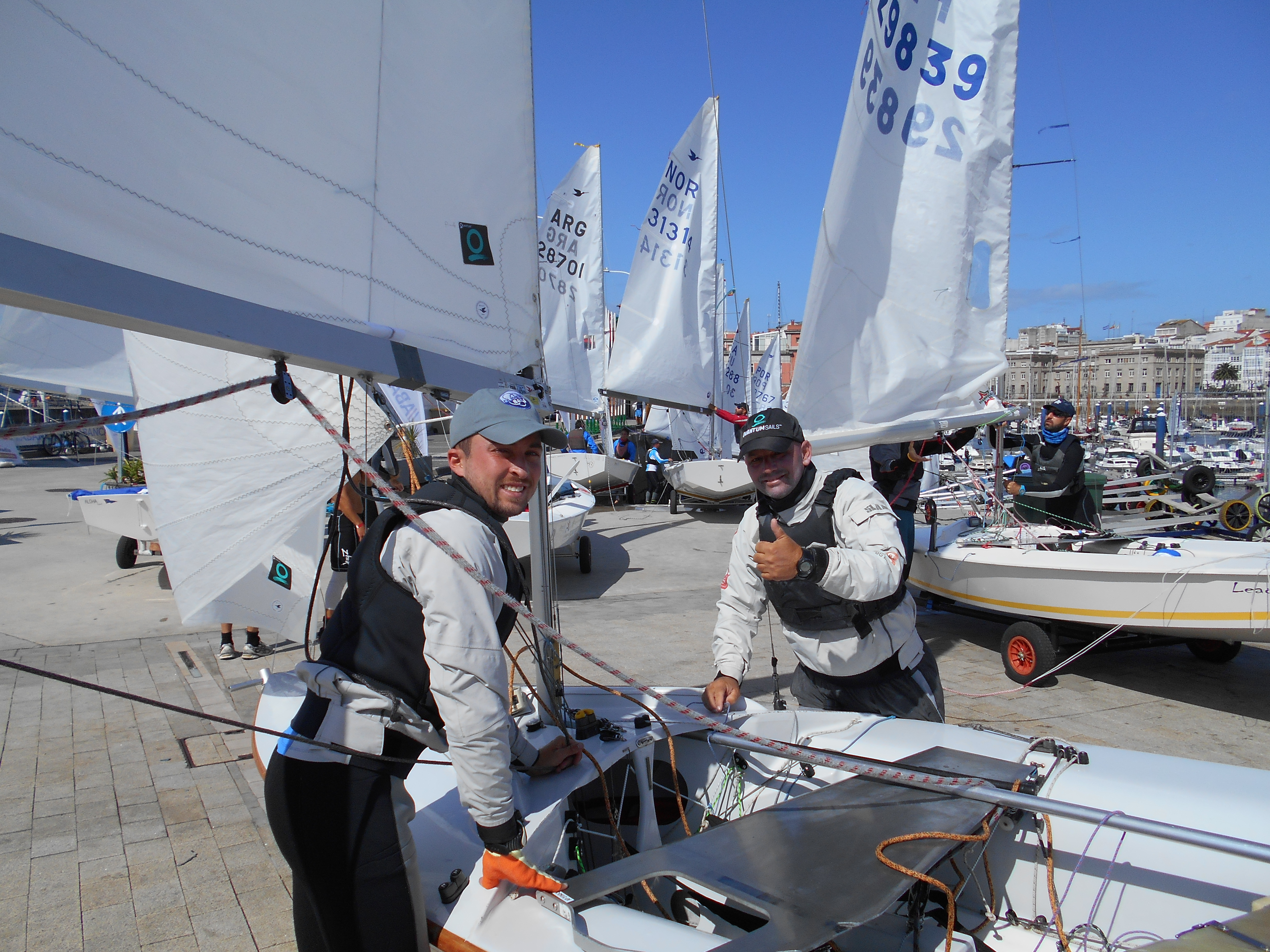

Personal information
- Nationality: Brazil
- Born: 24 November 1972 (age 53) Porto Alegre, Brazil

Sailing career
- Sport: Sailing
- Club: Clube dos Jangadeiros
Medal record
Sailing
Representing Brazil
Pan American Games
Silver medal – second place	1999 Winnipeg	Snipe
Gold medal – first place	2007 Rio	Snipe

Alexandre Dias Paradeda (born 24 November 1972 in Porto Alegre), also known as Xandi or Careca, is a Brazilian sailor who competed in the Summer Olympic Games, the Pan American Games, the South American Games, the Snipe World Championships and the 470 World Championships.

Paradeda first major success came in 1987, when he won the Brazilian National Championship of the Optimist class. In 1992, he won again a national championship, this time the Brazilian National Championship of the Snipe class, and also the Snipe South American Championship crewing for his father Marco Aurélio Paradeda, earning a spot for the 1995 Pan American Games, where he finished 4th. In 1995, he won again the Snipe Brazilian National Championship (repeating top place in 1996, 1997, 1998, 2001, 2004, 2011, 2014, 2015, 2017, 2018, 2019 and 2026) and the Snipe South American Championship, already as a skipper (which he won again in 2009 and 2014).

In 1997, he entered 470 competition at the 470 World Championships in Tel Aviv, where he finished 10th. Next year, in 1998, at Mallorca, he took 16th place. In 1999, back on the Snipe class, he earned a silver medal at the 1999 Pan American Games, and in 2000 he went back to the 470 class competing at the Sydney 2000 Summer Olympics, where he placed 26th. His biggest success came in 2001, when he won the Snipe Worlds.

Back to the 470 class, he competed in the World Championships in Cagliari 2002, Cádiz 2003 and Zadar 2004. In 2004, he was 8th at the Athens Summer Olympics.

Again in the Snipe class, he became Western Hemisphere & Orient champion in 2004, won the gold medal at the 2007 Pan American Games and took 6th place in 2015. He finished second in 2011 and third in 2013 at the Snipe Worlds. In 2014, he won the gold medal at the South American Games.

== Olympic Games ==
- 26th place in 470 at Sydney 2000
- 8h place in 470 at Athens 2004

== Pan American Games ==
- 4th place in Snipe at Mar del Plata 1995
- 2nd place in Snipe at Winnipeg 1999
- 1st place in Snipe at Rio de Janeiro 2007
- 6th place in Snipe at Toronto 2015
