= Ricardo Fabini =

Uruguayan sailor

Personal information
- Full name: Ricardo Fabini Belhot
- Nationality: Uruguay
- Born: 6 May 1967 (age 59) Montevideo, Uruguay

Sailing career
- Sport: Sailing
- Club: Yacht Club Uruguayo
Medal record
Sailing
Representing Uruguay
Snipe World Championships
Gold medal – first place	1989 Saga	Snipe
Snipe Western Hemisphere & Orient Championship
Gold medal – first place	1990 Olivos	Snipe
South American Championship
Gold medal – first place	1993 Buenos Aires	Snipe
Gold medal – first place	1996 Montevideo	Snipe
Gold medal – first place	1998 Punta del Este	Snipe
Pan American Games
Silver medal – second place	1995 Mar del Plata	Snipe
Silver medal – second place	2019 Lima	Snipe

Ricardo Fabini Belhot (Note: In this Spanish name, the first or paternal surname is Fabini and the second or maternal family name is Belhot.) (born 6 May 1967) is a Uruguayan sailor silver medallist in the Pan American Games, and World champion, Western Hemisphere champion and South American champion in the Snipe class.

== Career ==
=== Olympic Games ===
- 16th place in Soling at Barcelona 1992.
- 30th place in Laser at Athens 1996.

=== Pan American Games ===
- 2nd place in Snipe at Mar del Plata 1995.

=== World Championships ===
- 1st place in Snipe at Saga 1989.
