= Carlos Vilar =

Argentine sailor (1930–2021)

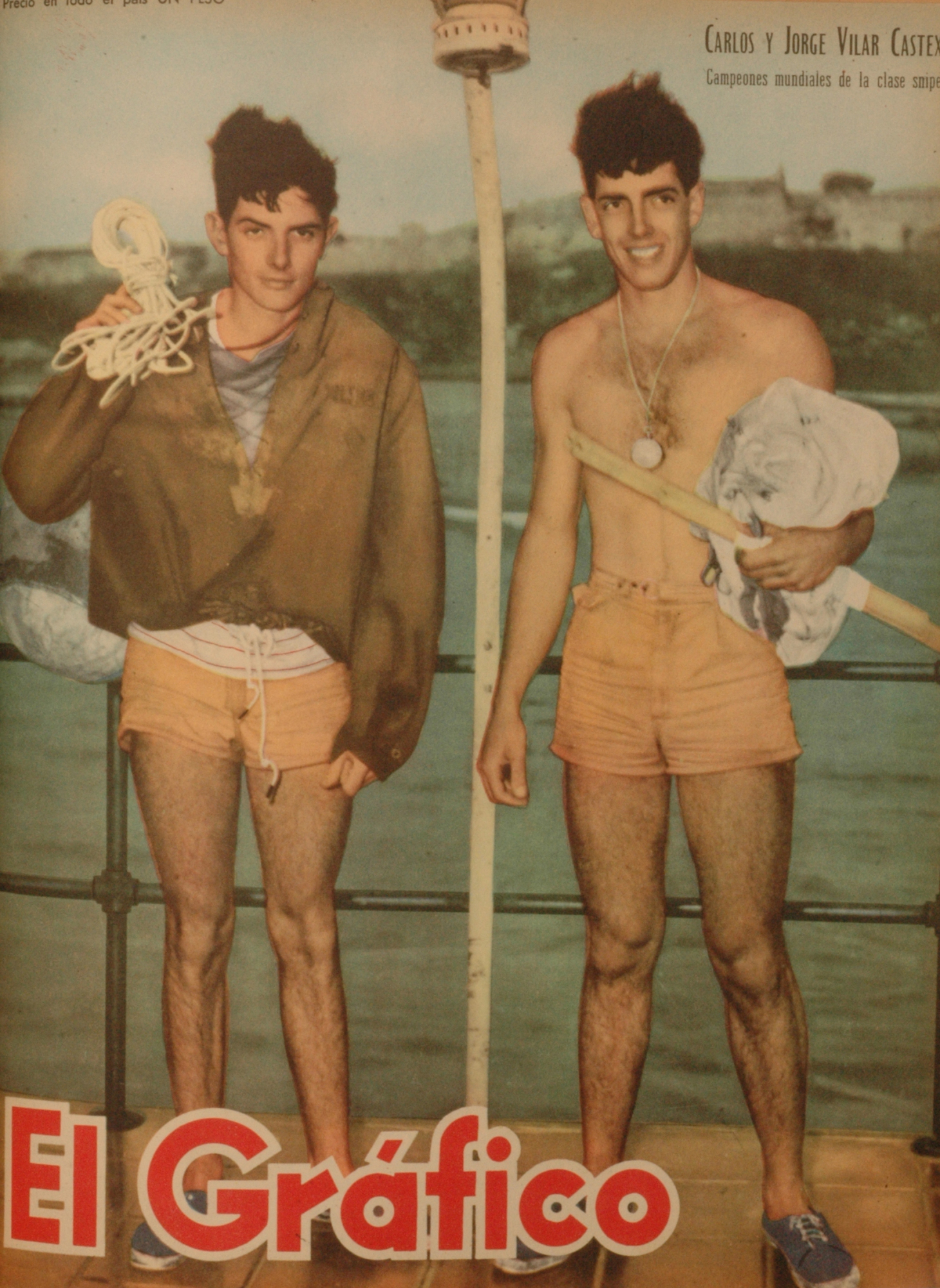

Personal information
- Full name: Carlos Vilar Castex
- Nationality: Argentina
- Born: 9 June 1930 Buenos Aires
- Died: 29 June 2021 (aged 91) Buenos Aires

Sport

Sailing career
- Class: Snipe
- Club: Club Náutico San Isidro
Competition record
Sailing
Representing Argentina
Pan American Games
Gold medal – first place	Buenos Aires 1951	Snipe
Snipe World Championships
Gold medal – first place	Palma de Mallorca 1948	Snipe
Silver medal – second place	Larchmont 1949	Snipe
Gold medal – first place	Havana 1951	Snipe

Carlos Vilar Castex (9 June 1930 – 29 June 2021) was an Argentine sailor gold medallist in the Pan American Games and the Snipe World Championships.

== Biography ==
Vilar was born in Buenos Aires. He started sailing Snipes with his brother, Jorge, at the Club Náutico San Isidro and entered competition on the class in 1947. He went on to win the World Championship in 1948 as a skipper and in 1951 as a crew, in both cases with his brother Jorge. They also placed second at the 1949 Worlds. In 1953 they finished 6th and in 1958 they were 5th.

Vilar died from COVID-19 and heart disease in June 2021.

== Pan American Games ==
- 1st place in Snipe at Buenos Aires 1951.
