= Ernesto Rodriguez (sailor) =

Ernesto Rodríguez
Personal information
- Nationality: United States
- Born: 21 January 1970 (age 56) Sagua La Grande Cuba

Sailing career
- Sport: Sailing
- Classes: Snipe, Finn, Laser

Ernesto Rodríguez (born January 21, 1970, in Sagua La Grande, Cuba), is a world class sailor in the Snipe, Finn and Laser classes.

In 1984, he started sailing in Matanzas at age 14 and won the Cuban Interscholastic National Championships in 1987 and two Junior National Championships in 1989 and 1990 in the Finn class. He was runner-up at the 1993 Laser class Cuban National Championship and champion in 1994 and 1995, getting him to compete with the Cuban team at the 1994 Laser World Championship and the 1995 Pan American Games, and also being selected by the Cuban Olympic team for the 1996 Summer Olympics. As a member of the team, he competes at the US Sailing's Miami Olympic Classes Regatta in 1996 and decides to ask for asylum in the United States.

Since then, he won the Open Snipe World Championship in 2026, the ILCA Masters World Championships in 2021 and the Snipe Masters World Championships in 2016 and 2025. He also won the United States Snipe National Championship in 2004, 2007, 2012, 2016, 2021, 2022 and 2023; the Snipe North American Championship in 2009, 2014, 2017, 2018, 2021, 2024 and 2025; and the Snipe Western Hemisphere and Asia Championship in 2010 and 2018.

== Pan American Games ==
- 5. at the 1995 Pan American Games - Men's Laser class
- Gold at the 2019 Pan American Games - Snipe
- Silver at the 2023 Pan American Games – Snipe
