= Mac Agnese =

English sailor

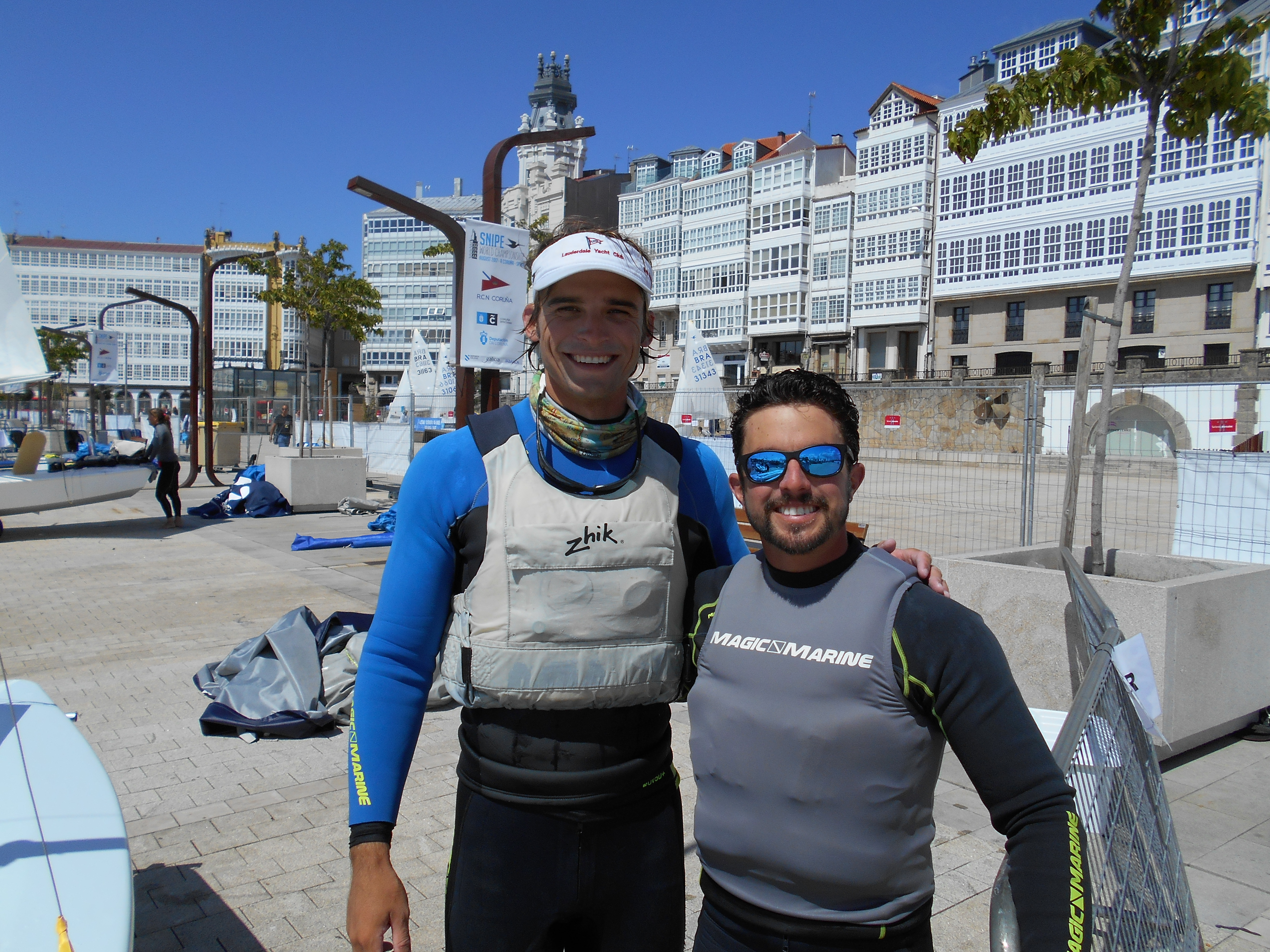
- Mac Agnese at the 2017 Snipe Worlds with Raúl Ríos

Personal information
- Nationality: American
- Born: April 26, 1994 (age 32) Washington, DC, United States
- Height: 6’1”

Sailing career
- Sport: Sailing
- College team: Boston College
- Club: Lauderdale Yacht Club
- Classes: Melges 24, 29er, Snipe
Medal record
Sailing
Representing United States
World Championships
Gold medal – first place	2005 Key Largo	Melges 24
Bronze medal – third place	2010 Istanbul	SL16
Silver medal – second place	2011 Zadar	29er
Gold medal – first place	2017 Corunna	Snipe

Maximiliano Agnese, known as Mac Agnese (born April 26, 1994, in Fort Lauderdale), is a world class sailor in the Melges 24, SL16, 29er and Snipe classes.

He started sailing Optimist at age five, and won his first world championship by age 11 in the Melges 24 class. At the Youth Sailing World Championships, he won the bronze medal in the SL16 class in 2010 and the silver medal in the 29er class in 2011. In 2017 he crewed for Raúl Ríos winning the Snipe Worlds.

He attended Fort Lauderdale High School before joining the Boston College sailing team, where he was the 2011–12 team captain.

He was a member of the United States Team competing at the 2019 SailGP together with Rome Kirby, Riley Gibbs, Hans Henken and Dan Morris. Later, he joined the American Magic team that competes for the 2021 America's Cup.
