= Sailing at the 1951 Pan American Games =

Sailing at the 1951 Pan American Games was held at Buenos Aires in March 1951. Equipment classes were the Snipe dinghy and the Star keelboat. Argentina and Brazil finished one-two in the Snipe class, and the order was reversed for the Stars. The United States did not compete in the regatta.

== Open events ==
Event	Gold	Silver	Bronze
Snipe class	Argentina; Carlos Vilar; Jorge Vilar	Brazil; Jean Maligo; Gerald Queiros	not awarded
Star class	Brazil; Roberto Bueno; Gastao Pereira	Argentina; Jorge Brauer; Emilio Momps	Chile; Adolfo Hurtado; Kurt Angelbeck
