= Nélido Manso =

Cuban sailor (born 1966)

Personal information
- Full name: Nélido Manso López
- Born: December 26, 1966 (age 59) Caibarién, Cuba

Sailing career
- Sport: Sailing
- Class: Snipe
Medal record
Sailing
Representing Cuba
Pan American Games
Gold medal – first place	1991 Havana	Snipe
Gold medal – first place	1995 Mar del Plata	Snipe
Gold medal – first place	1999 Winnipeg	Snipe
Silver medal – second place	2003 Santo Domingo	Snipe
Central American & Caribbean Games
Gold medal – first place	1993 Ponce	Snipe
Snipe World Championships
Gold medal – first place	1999 Santiago de la Ribera	Snipe

Nélido Manso López (born December 26, 1966, in Caibarién) is a sailor from Cuba, who represented his country at the Pan American Games, the Central American and Caribbean Games and the Snipe World Championships, winning four medals (three golds -1991, 1995, 1999- and one silver -2003-) at the Pan American Games, one medal (gold -1993-) at the Central American and Caribbean Games, and the Snipe Worlds (1999).
