= Félix Gancedo =

Spanish sailor (born 1940)

Personal information
- Nationality: Spain

Sailing career
- Sport: Sailing
- Club: Real Club Mediterráneo
- Classes: Laser, Star
Medal record
Sailing
Representing Spain
World Championships
Bronze medal – third place	1971 Rio de Janeiro	Snipe
Gold medal – first place	1973 Málaga	Snipe
Gold medal – first place	1975 Punta del Este	Snipe
Silver medal – second place	1981 Long Beach, California	Snipe
Gold medal – first place	1991 Santiago de la Ribera	Snipe (marters)
European Championships
Gold medal – first place	1972 Matosinhos	Snipe
Gold medal – first place	1974 Hanko	Snipe
Silver medal – second place	1976 Le Havre	Snipe
Gold medal – first place	1978 Valencia	Snipe
Gold medal – first place	1990 Matosinhos	Snipe

Félix Gancedo (born 18 September 1940 in Málaga, Spain) is a Spanish sailor and world-class competitor in the Snipe, Flying Dutchman, Tempest and Dragon classes.

He won the Snipe class world championship in 1973 and 1975, was second in 1981 and third in 1971. Besides, he won the European championship of the class in four occasions (1972, 1974, 1978 and 1990); the Spanish nationals fifteen times (1969, 1970, 1971, 1972, 1973, 1974, 1975, 1977, 1978, 1979, 1980, 1981, 1983, 1985 and 1990); and the Masters Worlds (1991).

In the Flying Dutchman class, he was Spanish national champion 1964, 1967 and 1968.

== Olympic Games ==
Gancedo sailed at 3 different Olympic Games:

- 11th place in Flying Dutchman at Acapulco 1968.
- 15th place in Dragon at Munich 1972.
- 9th place in Tempest at Montréal 1976.
