= Sailing at the 1999 Pan American Games =

There were multiple events regarding sailing at the 1999 Pan American Games. Brazil won the most medals in general and the most bronze and silver medals, while Canada won the most gold medals. There were men's, women's, and open events conducted during the competition.

== Men's events ==
Event	Gold	Silver	Bronze
Mistral (sailboard)	Marcos Galván; Argentina	Ricardo Santos; Brazil	Mike Gebhardt; United States
Laser Standard	Robert Scheidt; Brazil	Mark Mendelblatt; United States	Diego Romero; Argentina
Finn	Richard Clarke; Canada	Russell Silvestri; United States	Bruno Prada; Brazil

== Women's events ==
Event	Gold	Silver	Bronze
Mistral (sailboard)	Lanee Butler; United States	Caroll-Ann Alie; Canada	Christina Forte; Brazil
Laser Radial	Kelly Hand; Canada	Sara Wright; Bermuda	Isabela Maracucci; Brazil
Europe	Serena Amato; Argentina	Fernanda Pinto; Brazil	Tania Elías Calles; Mexico

== Open events ==
Event	Gold	Silver	Bronze
Sunfish	Oskar Johansson; Canada	Malcolm Smith; Bermuda	David van Cleef; United States
Snipe	Cuba; Nélido Manso; Octavio Lorenzo	Brazil; Alexandre Paradeda; Flávio Fernandes	Argentina; Luis Soubié; Cecilia Granucci
Lightning	Andy Horton; United States	Cláudio Biekarck; Brazil	Larry MacDonald; Canada
Hobie 16	Puerto Rico; Enrique Figueroa; Carla Malatrasi	Brazil; Claudio Cardoso; Patricia Kirschner	Canada; David Sweeney; Kevin Smith

== Medal table ==
Place	Nation	Gold medal	Silver medal	Bronze medal	Total
1	Canada	3	1	2	6
2	United States	2	2	2	6
2	Argentina	2	0	2	4
3	Brazil	1	5	3	9
4	Cuba	1	0	0	1
5	Puerto Rico	1	0	0	1
6	Bermuda	0	2	0	2
7	Mexico	0	0	1	1
Total		10	10	10	30
