= Laiseca =

Laiseca is a surname occurring in Spanish-speaking areas. Notable people with the surname include:

- Alberto Laiseca (1941–2016), Argentine writer
- Gabriel Laiseca (1936–2025), Spanish sailor

== See also ==
- Roberto Laiseka (born 1969), a Spanish professional road bicycle racer
- La Seca, a municipality located in the Spanish province of Valladolid
