= Julio Alsogaray (sailor) =

Argentine sailor (born 1980)

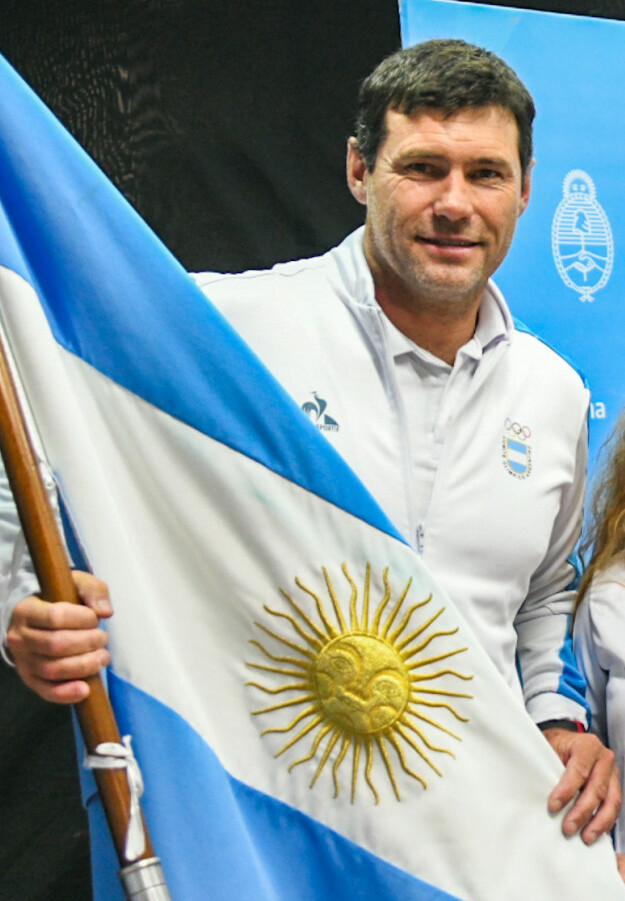
- Julio Alsogaray carrying the Argentine national flag at the V South American Beach Games, in Santa Marta, Colombia, in July 2023

Personal information
- Nationality: Argentina
- Born: April 11, 1980 (age 46) San Pedro, Buenos Aires Province

Sailing career
- Sport: Sailing
- Club: Club Náutico San Pedro
- Classes: Optimist, Laser, Lightning and Snipe
Medal record
Sailing
Representing Argentina
Pan American Games
Gold medal – first place	2011 Guadalajara	Men's Laser
Gold medal – first place	2023 Santiago	Snipe
Bronze medal – third place	2007 Rio	Men's Laser

Julio Alsogaray (born 11 April 1980 in San Pedro, Buenos Aires Province) is an Argentine sailor in the Optimist, Laser, Lightning and Snipe classes.

- Worlds. Gold at the 2019 Lightning Worlds and the 2024 Snipe Worlds; silver at the 2008 Laser Worlds; and bronze at the 1994 Optimist Worlds.
- Olympic Games. At the 2008 Summer Olympics in Beijing he finished seventh, while at the 2012 Summer Olympics he finished 11th, and at the 2020 Summer Olympics he finished tenth.
- Central and South American Laser Championship 2012
- Snipe South American Championship 2024
