= Cottage Park Yacht Club =

Yacht club in Winthrop, Massachusetts, US

- Burgee
- Short name: CPYC
- Founded: 1902
- Location: One Baker Square, Winthrop, Massachusetts, 02152
- Commodore: Brian Murphy
- Website: www.cpyc.org

The Cottage Park Yacht Club is a private yacht club located in Winthrop, Massachusetts, on Boston Harbor.

== Fleets ==
One-Design racing fleets include N-10, Optimist, 420, Laser and Snipe Rhodes 19

== Sailors ==
The club holds two world championships: The 1963 Star World Championship, won by Joe Duplin and Francis Dolan, and the 2007 Snipe World Championship, won by Tomas Hornos and Enrique Quintero.

== Regattas ==
CPYC has hosted the Snipe North American Championship in 1999, 2008 and 2014, and the Western Hemisphere & Orient Championship in 2021.
