= Patrick Muglia =

American sailor (born 1962)

Patrick Muglia (born November 23, 1962, in La Rochelle, France) is an Olympic sailor, world champion, Pan-am gold medalist, and College national champion. He has sailed since age 11, with sailors such as America's Cup and Olympic medalists Dennis Conner, Mark Reynolds, John Kostecki and John Shadden.

Muglia was awarded the O'Leary Trophy in 1981, when he won the Snipe world championship as a crew of Jeff Lenhart, and the Commodore Charles E. Heinzerling Trophy in 1985. In the Snipe class, he also won the 1983 Pan American Games. He became US national team race and overall college champion with the USC Trojans in 1985.

In the 1988 Olympic Games, Muglia sailed with Pete Melvin in the Tornado class.

Melvin was also the lead designer of Team New Zealand's AC72 catamaran sailed in the 2013 America's Cup in San Francisco.

== Achievements ==
- 1981 Snipe World Champion
- 1983 Pan-Am Games, Gold Medalist, Venezuela
- 1985 ICSA Collegiate All-American
- 1985 ICSA Collegiate National Champion
- 1988 Summer Olympic Games, Competitor, Seoul, Korea
- 1988 US Olympic Team Member
- 1988 US Olympic Trials - Winner
- 1988 Top US Competitor, World Championships, Germany
- 1988 Top US Competitor, European Championships, France
- 1995 World Championship, 5th place, Argentina
