= Juan Manuel Alonso-Allende =

Spanish sailor

Personal information
- Full name: Juan Manuel Alonso Allende y Allende
- Nationality: Spain
- Born: 8 December 1918 Bilbao
- Died: 10 March 1984 (aged 65)
- Height: 1.74 m (5 ft 8 1/2 in)
- Weight: 79 kg (174 lb)

Sailing career
- Sport: Sailing
- Club: Real Sporting Club
- Class(es): Snipe, Star, Firefly, Flying Dutchman

Juan Manuel Alonso-Allende Allende (8 December 1918 – 10 March 1984) was a Spanish Olympic sailor who competed in three Olympic Games between 1948 and 1968. Alonso-Allende also was a world-class competitor in the Snipe, Star, Firefly and Flying Dutchman dinghy classes.

He won the Snipe class world championship in 1957. He also won the first edition of the Spanish championship of the class in 1942 as a crew with his brother, José Maria, and as a skipper in 1956 and 1957.

In the Star class, he was Spanish national champion in 1943, 1945, 1947, 1966, 1967 and 1968.

== Olympic Games ==
Alonso-Allende sailed at 3 different Olympic Games:

- 19th place in Firefly at London 1948.
- 11th place in Flying Dutchman at Rome 1960.
- 18th place in Star at Mexico 1968.
