= Erik Schmidt (sailor) =

Brazilian sailor

Medal record

Sailing

Representing Brazil

Pan American Games
Gold medal – first place	1959 Chicago	Lightning
Silver medal – second place	1963 São Paulo	Lightning

Erik Oluf Preben Schmidt (born 30 April 1939 in Rio de Janeiro) is a Brazilian sailor who competed in the Summer Olympic Games, the Pan American Games, the Snipe World Championships, the Star World Championships and the Lightning World Championships.

He is the son of Preben Tage Axel Schmidt (born in 1898 in Frederiksberg, Denmark) and Helene Margrete Jelinski (born in Lyck, East Prussia) and brother of Ingrid, Margrete and Axel Schmidt, also competitive Brazilian sailors. Ingrid is the mother of Torben Grael, Lars Grael, and Axel Grael.

Him and his twin brother Axel Schmidt were known as "the sea twins" after winning 3 Snipe Worlds in a row (1961, 1963 and 1965). They also won the 1959 Pan American Games and finished 2nd in the 1963 Pan American Games in Lightning and third in the 1961 Lightning World Championships. In the Star class, they were 9th at the 1967 Star World Championships.

== Pan American Games ==
Erik Schmidt sailed at 2 different Pan American Games:

- 1st place in Lightning at Chicago 1959.
- 2nd place in Lightning at São Paulo 1963.

== Olympic Games ==
Erik Schmidt sailed at 2 different Olympic Games:

- 7th place in Star at Acapulco 1968.
- 6th place in Soling at Munich 1972.
