= Sailing at the 2003 Pan American Games =

The 2003 Pan American Games hosted eight different sailing events. Men competed in the Mistral and Laser Standard events. Women also competed in the Mistral event, but they then competed in the Laser Radial event instead of the Laser Standard. There were also four open events this year, which included Sunfish, Snipe, Hobie 16, and J/24. Brazil won the gold medal count and tied Canada for the total medal count in sailing events. Argentina trailed with three total medals while Chile, Mexico, and the United States got two total medals each.

== Men's events ==
Event	Gold	Silver	Bronze
Mistral (sailboard)	Ricardo Santos; Brazil	Marcos Galván; Argentina	Kevin Stittle; Canada
Laser Standard	Robert Scheidt; Brazil	Bernard Luttmer; Canada	Matías del Solar; Chile

== Women's events ==
Event	Gold	Silver	Bronze
Mistral (sailboard)	Lanee Butler; United States	Dominique Vallée; Canada	Catalina Walther; Argentina
Laser Radial	Tania Elías Calles; Mexico	Kemia Rasa; Canada	Florencia Cerutti; Argentina

== Open events ==
Event	Gold	Silver	Bronze
Sunfish	Eduardo Cordero; Venezuela	Malcolm Smith; Bermuda	Raúl Aguayo; Dominican Republic
Snipe	Brazil; Bruno Amorim; Dante Bianchi	Cuba; Nélido Manso; Octavio Lorenzo	Uruguay; Santiago Silveira; Nicolas Shaban
Hobie 16	Puerto Rico; Enrique Figueroa; Carla Malatrasi	Mexico; Armando Noriega; Pamela Noriega	Guatemala; Juan Ignacio Maegli; Andrés López
J/24	United States; T. Healy; D. Crocker; G. Borges; N. Judson	Brazil; Maurício Santa Cruz; João Carlos Jordão; Alan Adler; Daniel Santiago	Chile; A. Gonzalez; C. Engell; P. Barahona; M. Avaria
