= Bruno Amorim (sailor) =

Brazilian sailor (born 1975)

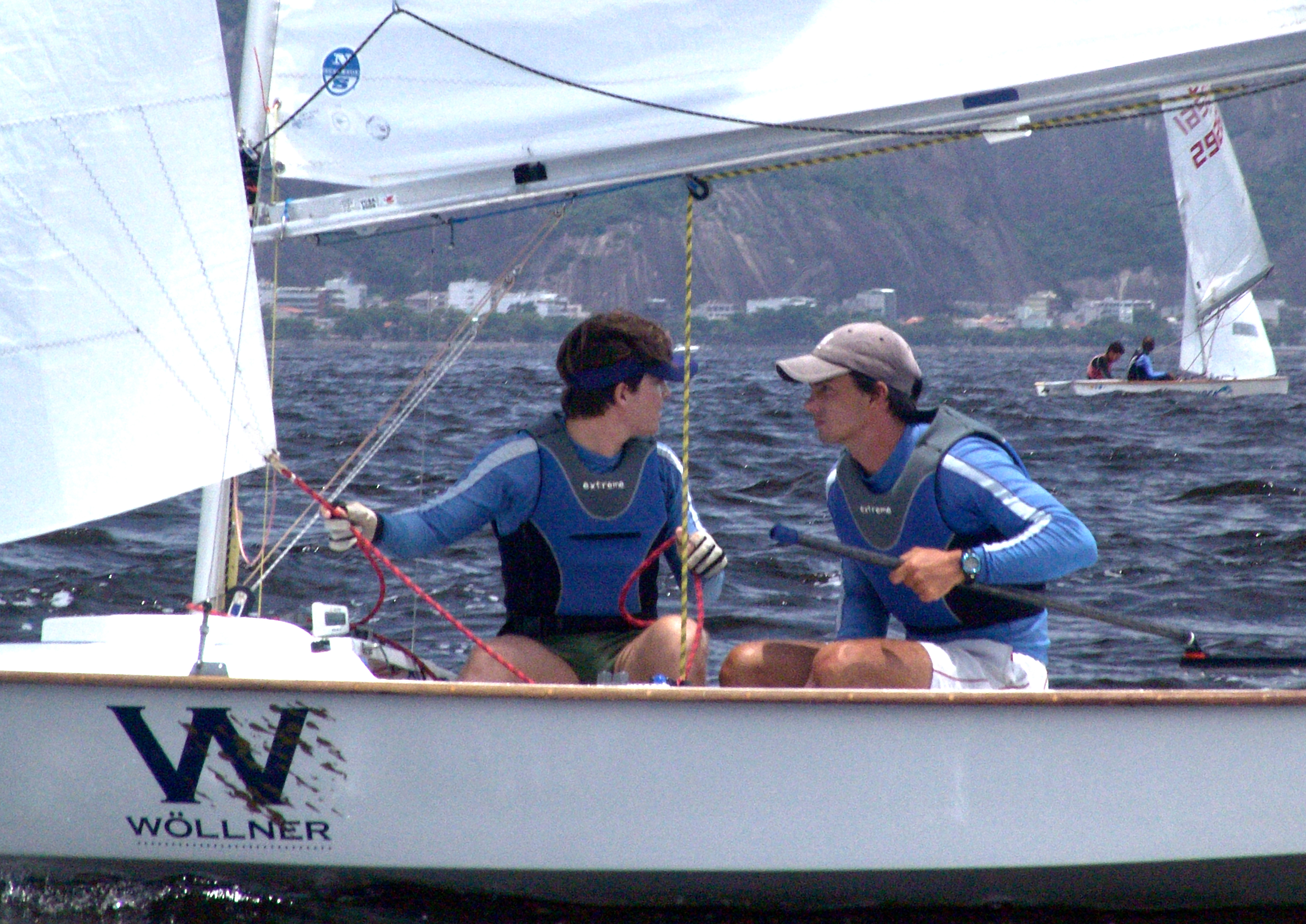
- January 2007

Personal information
- Full name: Bruno Bethlem de Amorim
- Nationality: Brazil
- Born: 22 October 1975 (age 50) Rio de Janeiro, Brazil

Sport

Sailing career
- Class(es): 470, Snipe
- Club: Iate Clube do Rio de Janeiro
Medal record
Sailing
Representing Brazil
Pan American Games
Gold medal – first place	2003 Santo Domingo	Snipe
South American Games
Gold medal – first place	2006 Buenos Aires	Snipe
South American Championship
Gold medal – first place	2000 Rio de Janeiro	Snipe
Gold medal – first place	2018 Porto Alegre	Snipe
Snipe World Championships
Gold medal – first place	2009 San Diego	Snipe
Bronze medal – third place	2011 Rungsted	Snipe
Gold medal – first place	2013 Rio de Janeiro	Snipe

Bruno Bethlem de Amorim (born 22 October 1975 in Rio de Janeiro), also known as "Bebum", is a Brazilian sailor gold medalist in the Pan American Games, the South American Games, and the Snipe World Championships.

He started sailing Optimist at the age of eleven, moving to Europe, 470 and Snipe later on his career. His biggest accomplishments have come in the Snipe class, where he has won the Brazilian National Championship ten times (2003, 2005, 2006, 2007, 2008, 2009, 2010, 2012, 2013 and 2024), twice the South American Championship (2000 and 2018), the Pan American Games (2003) and the South American Games (2006), and twice the World Championships (2009 and 2013), where he also won the bronze medal in 2011.

== Pan American Games ==
- 1st place in Snipe at Santo Domingo 2003.

== South American Games ==
- 1st place in Snipe at Buenos Aires 2006.

== World Championships ==
- 1st place in Snipe at San Diego 2009.
- 1st place in Snipe at Rio de Janeiro 2013.

== Olympic Games ==
He and Henrique Haddad placed 23rd in the men's 470 event at the 2016 Summer Olympics. He competed at the 2020 Summer Olympics.
