= Tomas Hornos =

Argentine sailor

Personal information
- Full name: Tomas Hornos
- Nationality: United States
- Born: 15 September 1988 (age 37) Argentina

Sailing career
- Sport: Sailing
- College team: Tufts University
- Club: Boston Yacht Club; Cottage Park Yacht Club
- Class(es): Snipe, Star, Laser
Medal record
Sailing
Representing United States
World Championships
Gold medal – first place	2007 Matosinhos	Snipe

Tomas Hornos (born September 15, 1988, in Argentina), is a world class sailor in the Star and Snipe classes.

He was the youngest skipper to win the Snipe World Championship by winning the title on his 19th birthday in 2007, and also the youngest sailor to be nominated for the US Sailor of the Year Awards, in 2008.

After sailing in the Optimist and Snipe classes, he moved to the Star class and was the top junior sailor at the 2010 Star World Championship in Rio de Janeiro (Brazil). He was third at the 2011 North Americans in Tampa, Florida, and runner-up in 2014 in Oxford, Maryland. He won the 2012 Western Hemisphere Championship in Annapolis, Maryland.

Back to the Snipe class, he was national champion in 2019.
