= Oakville Yacht Squadron =

Canadian private yacht club

- Burgee
- Short name: OYS
- Founded: 1946; 80 years ago
- Location: 97 Forsythe Street, Oakville, Ontario, Canada
- Website: www.oysqn.com

The Oakville Yacht Squadron (OYS) is a private yacht club based in Oakville, Ontario. Both past and present members have contributed to the sport of yachting and yacht design.

The Oakville Yacht Squadron has a junior sailing program.

== History ==
Founded in 1946, the Oakville Yacht Squadron is located on the shores of the Sixteen Mile Creek. In 1995, OYS absorbed the former Oakville Harbour Yacht Club and a growing interest in cruising was augmented by the members integrated into the club at that time.

Members of the club were involved in the creation of the Town of Oakville Water Air Rescue Force (TOWARF) in 1954, a volunteer marine search and rescue organization based in Oakville Harbour that later became Oakville Marine Search and Rescue OMSAR.

== Racing ==
Oakville Yacht Squadron organized the Snipe Western Hemisphere & Orient Championship in 1964 and the Snipe North American Championship in 1973, 1983, 1997 and 2005.

OYS hosted the Lake Ontario 300 in 2006. Touted as the Greatest Yacht Race on the Lake, the LO300 had a field of over 110 boats.

In 2019, OYS hosts the 134th year Lake Ontario Yacht Racing (LYRA) Regatta.
