= Santiago Lange =

Argentine sailor

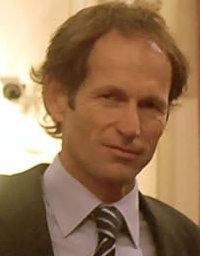

Personal information
- Full name: Santiago Raúl Lange Roberti
- Born: 22 September 1961 (age 65) San Isidro, Argentina

Sailing career
- Sport: Sailing
- College team: Solent University
- Club: Club Náutico San Isidro
Competition record
Sailing
Representing Argentina
Olympic Games
Gold medal – first place	2016 Rio de Janeiro	Nacra 17
Bronze medal – third place	2004 Athens	Tornado
Bronze medal – third place	2008 Beijing	Tornado
World Championships
Gold medal – first place	1985 Buenos Aires	Snipe
Gold medal – first place	1993 Porto Alegre	Snipe
Gold medal – first place	1995 Rimini	Snipe
Gold medal – first place	2004 Palma de Mallorca	Tornado
Silver medal – second place	1987 La Rochelle	Snipe
Silver medal – second place	2006 San Isidro	Tornado
Silver medal – second place	2014 Santander	Nacra 17
Bronze medal – third place	1979 Torquay	Cadet
Bronze medal – third place	2003 Cádiz	Tornado
Bronze medal – third place	2018 Aarhus	Nacra 17
Pan American Games
Silver medal – second place	1987 Indianapolis	Snipe
Silver medal – second place	1995 Mar del Plata	Laser

Santiago Raúl Lange Roberti (born 22 September 1961 in San Isidro, Argentina) is an Argentine Olympic sailor and a naval architect.

== Sailing career ==
He studied Naval Architecture at Southampton College of Higher Education (now known as Solent University) he did a degree in yacht design. He went on to work for Argentina designer German Frers for a couple of years before concentrating on competitive sailing.

=== Olympics ===
Representing Argentina over a 32-year period, he competed seven times in the Summer Olympics, winning a gold and two bronze medals.

Pos.	Games	Class	Crew	Notes	Ref.
9	1988 – Busan (KOR)	Soling	Pedro Ferrero; Raúl Lena		
9	1996 – Savannah (USA)	Laser	N/A		
10	2000 – Sydney (AUS)	Tornado	Mariano Parada		
Bronze	2004 – Athens (GRE)	Tornado	Carlos Espínola		
Bronze	2008 – Qingdao (CHN)	Tornado	Carlos Espínola		
Gold	2016 – Rio (BRA)	Nacra 17	Cecilia Carranza		
7	2020 – Enoshima (JPN)	Nacra 17 Foiling	Cecilia Carranza		

He qualified to represent Argentina at the 2020 Summer Olympics. He was one of Argentina's flag bearers for the opening ceremony at the 2020 Olympic Games.

=== World Championships ===
He is a four-time World Champion, with 3 Snipe World Championships (1985, 1993 and 1995) and 1 Tornado World Championship (2004), twice runner-up in 1987 (Snipe) and 2006 (Tornado), and three times third place in 1979 (Cadet), 2003 (Tornado) and 2018 (Nacra 17).

=== Offshore Sailing ===
He has twice sailed the Volvo Ocean Race; in 2001–02 on Team SEB and in 2008–09 on Telefónica Black.

=== America Cup ===
He sailed for Victory Challenge in the 2007 Louis Vuitton Cup.

For the 34th America's Cup was a member of Artemis Racing the Swedish Challenger.

=== Other Events ===
He also won the silver medal at the 1987 Pan American Games (Snipe) and the 1995 Pan American Games (Laser).

In 1985, he won the Snipe South American Championship.

== Awards ==
In 2016, he was named Sailor of the Year by World Sailing.

== Personal life ==
Lange's sons Yago and Klaus who are also Olympic sailors.

One of the most remarkable things is that in 2015 following a repeatable illness, he was diagnosed with cancer in his lung, which required 25% removal of one of his lungs he battled back quickly to take gold despite the loss of fitness and time on the water so close to the games in which he won gold.

Olympic Games
Preceded by Sebastiano Gastaldi	Flagbearer for Argentina; Tokyo 2020 with Cecilia Carranza	Succeeded by Francesca Baruzzi; Franco Dal Farra
