= Northern Yacht Club =

- Burgee
- Short name: NYC
- Founded: 1924
- Location: North Sydney, Nova Scotia
- Commodore: Dave Buis
- Website: http://northernyachtclub.ca

Northern Yacht Club is a yacht club in North Sydney, Nova Scotia (Canada).

The club has hosted the Snipe Western Hemisphere & Orient Championship in 1976, Worlds in 1979 and Junior Worlds in 1982.
