= Miramar Yacht Club =

Yacht club

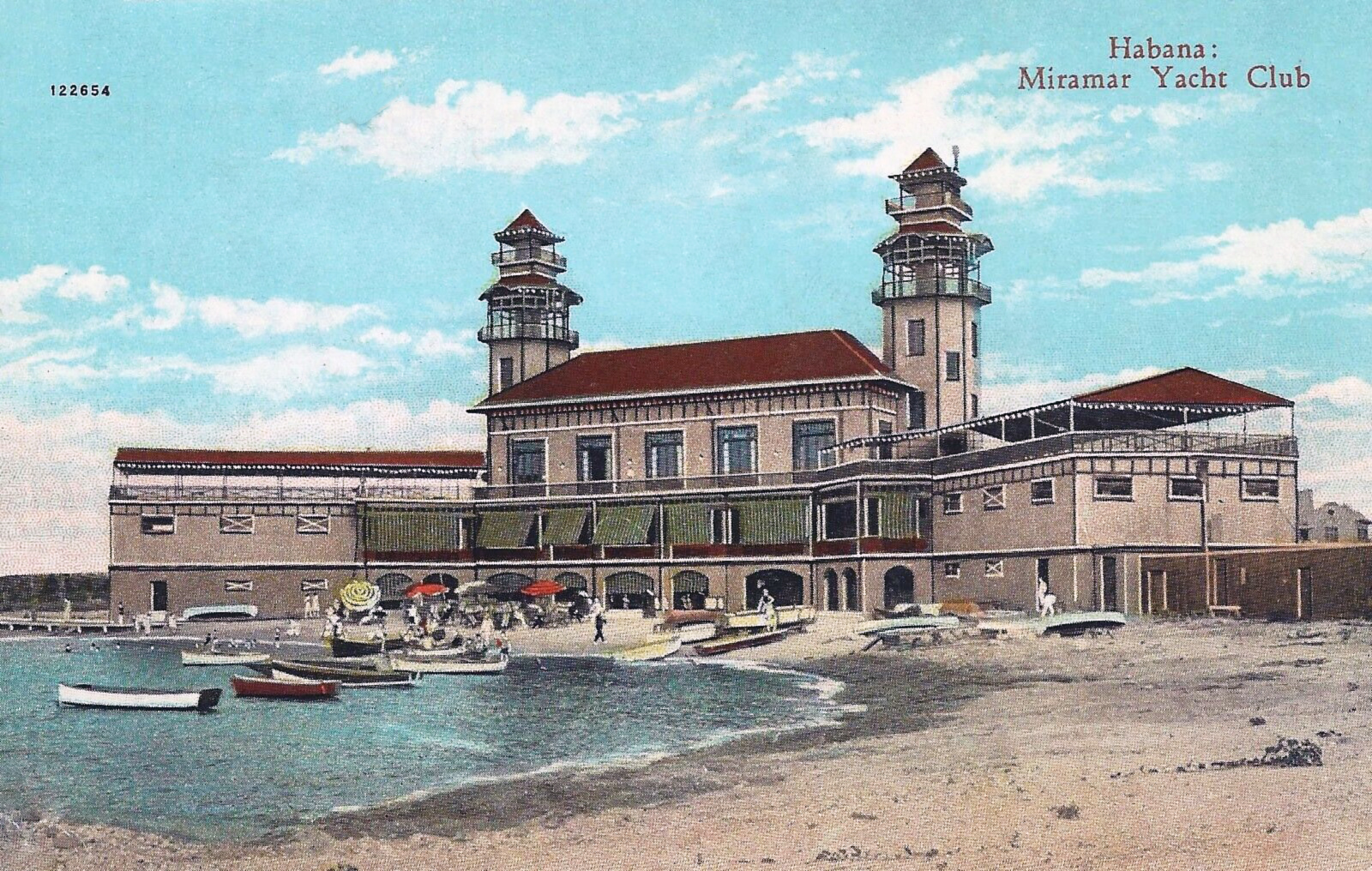
- Interactive map of the Miramar Yacht Club area
- Alternative names: MYC

General information
- Location: Miramar, Havana, La Habana Province, Cuba, 61 St. corner Primera St.
- Coordinates: 23°6′19.07″N 82°26′48.41″W
- Opened: 1926; 100 years ago

Website
- miramaryachtclub.com

Miramar Yacht Club (Spanish: Club Náutico de Miramar) was a private yacht and social club in Havana, Cuba. The Miramar Yacht Club was established by former Havana Yacht Club members in the 1920s in Miramar.

== Early history ==
It was founded in 1926 in the Miramar subdivision of Havana, Cuba, and could be seen from Fifth Avenue which led to the beach. The Miramar Yacht Club was located on 61 St. corner Primera St. and on the coastline of Marianao, facing the straits of Florida. It was situated next to the Havana Yacht Club.

== Yacht racing ==
In 1948, Alfonso Gomez-Mena of Havana's Miramar Yacht Club won the 10th annual 184-mile Miami-to-Nassau ocean race.

In 1949, Manuel Racso of Havana's Miramar Yacht Club set the record for the St. Petersburg-to-Havana yacht race with his Cuban schooner, Belletrix, finishing in 35 hours. The yacht club of Miramar made Manuel Antonio Rasco Jr. an honorary commodore for life (Commodore Ad Vitem) in 1957.

Dr. Clemente Inclán sailed the winning skipper in the 1950 Snipe Western Hemisphere and Asia Championship and was awarded the Hayward Western Hemisphere Trophy.

== Post-Revolution ==
After the Cuban revolution, the club was taken over by the communist government in 1961 and renamed the Patricio Lumumba Club. On 29 May 1966 a group of Cuban exiles composed of Tony Cuesta, Herminio Díaz García and others attacked the club and the Comodoro Hotel with rockets in a boat raid. They were attempting to distract the Cuban security forces so that Garcia could make his way into Cuba and assassinate Castro. These efforts failed and the exiles were overwhelmed by the Cuban forces, García and three others were killed.

== Presidents ==
- Dr. Mariano Vivanco
- Emilio Marill
- Manuel Antonio Rasco Jr.
