= Bernard Luttmer =

Canadian sailor

Personal information
- Born: 21 June 1979 (age 47) Toronto,
- Height: 183 cm (6 ft 0 in)
- Weight: 83 kg (183 lb)

Sailing career
- Sport: Sailing
- Club: Royal Canadian Yacht Club
- Classes: ILCA 7, 49er
Medal record
Sailing
Representing Canada
Pan American Games
Silver medal – second place	2003 Santo Domingo	Men's Laser

Bernard Luttmer (born 21 June 1979) is a Canadian sailor who competed in the Laser event at the 2004 Summer Olympics. He is a co-founder of Podium Development Corporation.
