= Henrique Haddad =

Brazilian sailor (born 1987)

Henrique Duarte Haddad (born 28 May 1987 in Rio de Janeiro) is a Brazilian sailor. He appeared in three Olympic Games sailing in the 470 category, partnering Bruno Bethlem at the 2016 - finishing 23rd - and 2020 Summer Olympics - finishing 16th - and with Isabel Swan at the 2024 Summer Olympics, finishing 10th.

In 2019 he won the Snipe World Championship.
