= Catalina Walther =

Argentine windsurfer

Personal information
- Born: 10 May 1983 (age 43) San Isidro, Argentina
- Height: 168 cm (5 ft 6 in)
- Weight: 53 kg (117 lb)

Sailing career
- Sport: Sailing
- Class(es): Mistral, Raceboard
Medal record
Sailing
Representing Argentina
Pan American Games
Bronze medal – third place	2003 Santo Domingo	Women's Mistral

Catalina Walther (born 10 May 1983) is an Argentine windsurfer. She competed in the women's Mistral One Design event at the 2004 Summer Olympics.
