= Caroll-Ann Alie =

Canadian windsurfer

Personal information
- Full name: Caroll-Ann Rosenberg
- Born: Caroll-Ann Alie; 6 July 1960 (age 66) Gracefield, Quebec
- Height: 173 cm (5 ft 8 in)
- Weight: 60 kg (132 lb)
- Spouse: Steve Rosenberg

Sailing career
- Sport: Sailing
- College team: Mistral, Lechner, Windglider, RS:X
- Club: Royal St. Lawrence Yacht Club
- Coached by: Steve Rosenberg
Medal record
Sailing
Representing Canada
Pan American Games
Gold medal – first place	1995 Mar del Plata	Sailboard
Silver medal – second place	1987 Indianapolis	Sailboard
Silver medal – second place	1999 Winnipeg	Sailboard

Caroll-Ann Rosenberg née Alie (born 6 July 1960) is a retired Olympian in windsurfing. Apart from her Olympic appearances, Alie won gold at the 1995 Pan American Games and silver at the 1999 Pan American Games. She was inducted into the Canadian Olympic Hall of Fame in 1993 and the Ottawa Sports Hall of Fame in 2005.

== Early life and education ==
Alie was born on 6 July 1960 in Gracefield, Quebec. She began her sports career as a downhill skier at Mont Ste. Marie as a child. After completing her Bachelor of Science in biology at the University of Michigan with a specialization in exercise, Alie became a licensed dietitian at California State University, Long Beach.

== Career ==
At the age of 18, Alie started competing in windsurfing. In 1982, Alie became a member of the Canada national sailing team. In World Sailing competitions, Alie participated in the IYRU World Women's Sailing Championships from 1983 to 1988 consecutively with her final appearance in 1991. During these championships she won silver in 1985 and gold in 1988 during the mistral event. Alie also competed in the Mistral World Championships in the late 1990s and the 2008 RS: X World Championship.

As an Olympian, Alie competed at the 1992 Summer Olympics, 1996 Summer Olympics and 2000 Summer Olympics in sailing but did not medal at any of her competitions. Apart from her Olympic performance, Alie won her first silver medal at the 1987 Pan American Games in boardsailing. Her later Pan Am medals were a gold in the 1995 Pan American Games and a silver at the 1999 Pan American Games. Alie retired from wind sailing after placing in 17th at the Sydney Olympics in 2000.

== Awards and honors ==
In 1993, Alie became a member of the Canadian Olympic Hall of Fame. Alie was inducted into the Ottawa Sport Hall of Fame in 2005. Outside of Ontario, Alie was inducted into the Quebec Sports Hall of Fame and the Quebec Sailing Hall of Fame in 2013.

== Personal life ==
Alie is married and has a child.
