= Wichita Falls Sailing Club =

- Burgee
- Short name: WFSC
- Founded: 1935
- Location: 301 Crow Trace Henrietta, Texas 76365
- Website: www.wfsail.org

The Wichita Falls Sailing Club is a Sailing Club located in Henrietta, Texas (United States), on the shore of Lake Arrowhead.

== History ==
Wichita Falls Sailing Club was founded in 1935 as Wichita Falls Yacht Club at Lake Wichita, in Wichita Falls. In 1973, the club moved to Lake Arrowhead.

== Fleets ==
The club was first dominated by the Snipe fleet number 34, based at the club, but in the 1960s the Windmill took over as the most popular boat. In the early 1970s, the first cabin boats, Venture 22 and 24, and in 1990 Flying Scot fleet number 170 was established at WFSC.

== Sailors ==
Perry Richardson Bass won the 1935 Snipe Worlds. Later on, in 1972, as navigator for Ted Turner's "American Eagle", he won the Southern Ocean Racing Circuit and the Sydney to Hobart Yacht Race.

Jim Loudermilk, a dedicated member of the Wichita Falls Sailing Club, gained local recognition for his remarkable restoration of a 1930s racing sailboat discovered in the attic of a downtown Wichita Falls building. The vessel, a Snipe class sailboat weighing approximately 800 pounds, had been stored decades earlier by a young Navy recruit before World War II. When the building changed ownership, Loudermilk was granted access to retrieve the boat under two conditions: he had to safely remove it and restore it to its original glory. His successful efforts not only preserved a piece of maritime history but also highlighted the club’s commitment to sailing heritage and community storytelling. [6]
