= Herminio Díaz García =

Herminio Díaz García was a Cuban exile who was involved in a number of assassination plots against Latin American political leaders.

== Biography ==
He was an opponent of the Cuban dictator Fulgencio Batista, training Fidel Castro's soldiers in Mexico. In 1957 he was recruited by Nicaraguan dictator Luis Somoza Debayle and Dominican dictator Rafael Trujillo to assassinate the Costa Rican president Jose Figueres. García travelled to San José, Costa Rica on a fake Venezuelan passport. Three days after his arrival he and his co-conspirators were arrested by Costa Rican authorities as they were staking out the Presidential Palace. Once captured they confessed to the authorities that Trujillo had promised them $200,000 and further aid to overthrow Batista in exchange for their services. They received a six-month prison sentence.

García was a member of the Union of Revolutionary Insurrection, reported to be a "gangster organization", and of the Batista-backed trade union Sindicato Gastronómico. He was the head of security at the casino in the Hotel Havana Riviera, then run by Florida mafia boss Santo Trafficante Jr. In 1962 he became involved with the November 30th Revolutionary Movement. In 1963 he entered the United States where he was debriefed by the CIA and expressed his wish to assassinate Castro.

On 29 May 1966 García participated in a boat raid along the coast of Cuba, led by Tony Cuesta. Rockets were fired at the Comodoro Hotel and the Miramar Yacht Club in order to distract the Cuban security forces so that Garcia could make his way into Cuba and assassinate Castro. These efforts failed and the exiles were overwhelmed by the Cuban forces, García and three others were killed.

García has been accused by those researchers who believe that there was a conspiracy involved in the assassination of John F. Kennedy of participating in the assassination. This belief is based on Garcia's background as an assassin and upon the testimony of Cuban exile Reinaldo Martinez Gomez in 2007. Gomez stated that two of his fellow exiles, Tony Cuesta and Remigio Arce, informed him of this. Cuesta, Gomez says, told him while they were in prison in Cuba, that the night García died, he confessed his involvement to Cuesta. While Arce told him that "the one who killed the president was our little friend". General Fabian Escalente, formerly of the Cuban Interior Ministry, has said that the Cuban government investigation of the assassination determined that García was involved.
