= Erik Johansen =

Danish sailor (1928–2012)

Personal information
- Nationality: Danish
- Born: 3 September 1928 Copenhagen, Denmark
- Died: 5 July 2012 (aged 83) Denmark

Sport
- Sport: Sailing

Erik Johansen (3 September 1928 – 5 July 2012) was a Danish sailor. He competed in the 5.5 Metre event at the 1968 Summer Olympics. Johansen died in Denmark on 5 July 2012, at the age of 83.
