= Tony Cuesta =

Cuban anti-Castro activist (1926–1992)

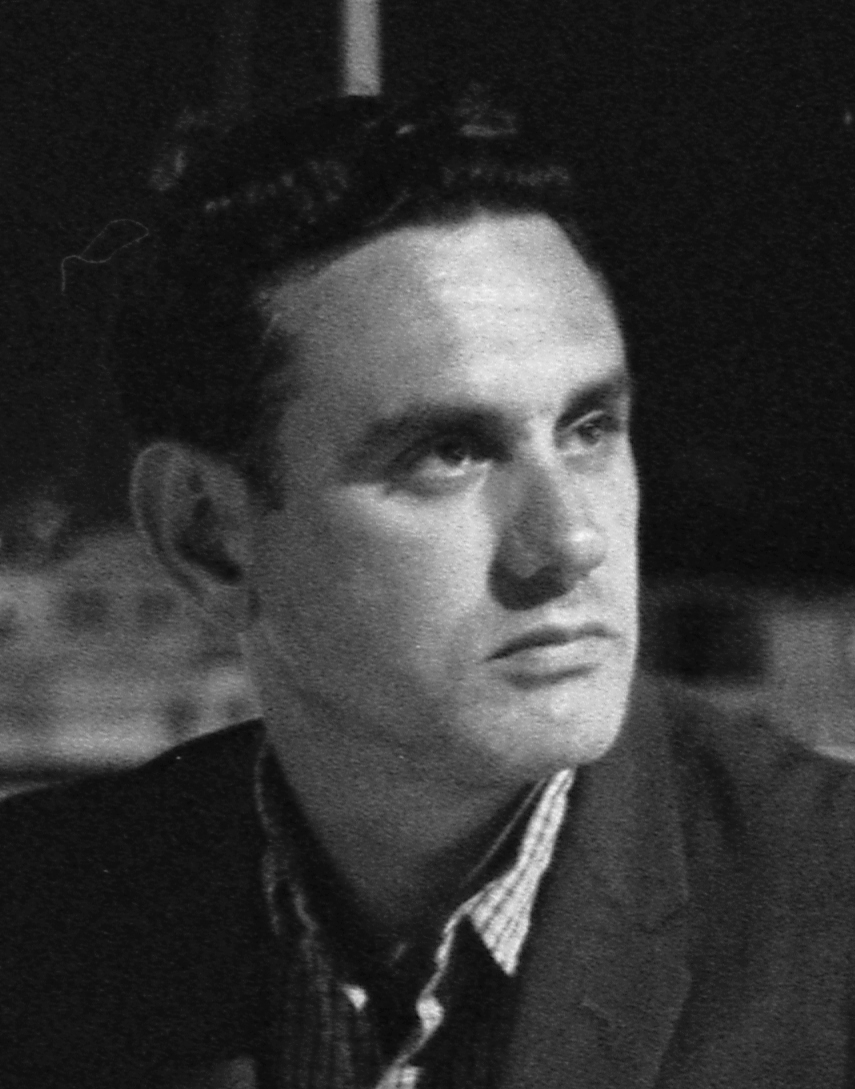
- Cuesta in 1963
- Born: June 13, 1926; Santiago de Cuba, Republic of Cuba
- Died: December 2, 1992 (aged 66); Miami, Florida, U.S.
- Children: 2
- Military career
- Allegiance: 26th of July Movement (before 1960)
- Units: Alpha 66, Comandos L

Tony Cuesta (13 June 1926 – 2 December 1992) was an anti-Castro Cuban militant.

== Life and background ==
He was born in Santiago de Cuba to a history professor mother and a business manager father, growing up a member of the pre-Castro upper middle class of Cuba. Cuesta was educated at the University of Havana. The anti-Batista political movements had a strong influence in his college life but he later turned his head against the direction taken by the new government towards stricter Soviet-like models that led him to make his decision to flee Cuba. Initially a member of the 26th of July Movement and a close supporter of Fidel Castro, Cuesta in 1960 defected to the United States, and in 1961 was one of the founders of the anti-Communist paramilitary organization Alpha 66. He later set up the guerrilla group "Comandos L" (the L standing for Libertad) which operated out of Anguilla.

In March 1963 Cuesta's Commando-L fired a canon at the Soviet freighter Baku off the coast of Cuba. The USSR made a formal diplomatic complaint to the U.S. Embassy in protest and on 3 April the Russian ambassador Andrei Gromyko met with US ambassador Foy D. Kohler to complain. This raid and a preceding one on 17 March by Alpha 66 was condemned by the Kennedy administration, considering it provocative and pointless.

== Exile leadership and paramilitary activity ==
Cuesta became one of the most prolific leaders in the anti-Castro movement of exiles, leading Comandos L once in exile and taking part in various paramilitary actions against the Cuban government. In 1966, Cuesta was captured in Cuba. He had been attempting to smuggle men into Cuba, one of whom was Herminio Díaz García, for the purpose of assassinating Castro. During the mission he was fired upon by a Soviet ship. However, rather than surrender, he attempted to blow his ship up with a hand grenade, as a result of which he lost an eye and an arm.

He remained in prison until October 1978 when he was part of a group of 46 released prisoners. He arrived in Miami to a reception of his fellow exiles at the Decade County auditorium, receiving a standing ovation.

== Later life and exile involvement ==
After his release, he returned to Miami and refounded Comandos L. Tony Cuesta continued to be a leading figure in the politics of exile, giving public statements regarding the activities at the start of the 90s, and scrutinizing the personal losses and unsatisfied struggles of the anti-Castro movement. The unsuccessful mission had caused him to be permanently disabled and the injuries had caused him permanent pain in his eyesight and arm leading to extreme complications in his life after the incident In a declaration of popular opinion in 1992, Cuesta described the exile struggle as a cause carried with both pride and sorrow, confessing the emotional cost of decades of warfare but retaining his faith in a post-Castro future.

== Death and personal life ==
He died in Miami on 2 December 1992 from a heart attack at the Kendall Regional Medical Center where he had been a patient since 16 November. At the time of his death he was working on his memoir Blind Courage. He was married four times. His death was immensely popular among the Cuban exile community, where his long history of militancy and self-sacrifice turned him into a household name across older generations of anti-Castro activists.

== Bibliography ==
- Plomo y Fantasía (1984) ISBN 9780918901064

== Sources ==
- "Tony Cuesta, Leader Of Anti-Castro Unit, Dies at 66 in Miami", New York Times, Dec. 4, 1992.
