= SL 16 =

Sport catamaran class

Boat
- Crew: 2

Hull
- Hull weight: 145 kg
- LOA: 4,800 m (15,700 ft)
- Beam: 2,320 m (7,610 ft)

Rig
- Mast height: 8 m (26 ft)

Sails
- Mainsail area: 13.75 m^{2}
- Jib/genoa area: 3.75 m^{2}
- Spinnaker area: 17 m^{2}

Racing
- D-PN: 73.0

The SL 16 (also known as Sirena SL16) is a 4.80 m long fiberglass sailing catamaran. It is designed to be sailed by two people. The SL 16 was selected by ISAF in 2005 for the Youth Sailing World Championships.

It has a D-PN of 73.0

== History ==
The SL 16 was designed in 2003 by Yves Loday. The boat is based on the KL 15.5 from 1993, but has bigger and more modern rig.

- Units build: 800 total, 200 in 2002–2007, 50 in 2007

== See also ==
- List of multihulls
