= Sailing at the 1995 Pan American Games =

The sailing competitions at the 1995 Pan American Games took place in Mar Del Plata, Argentina.

== Men's events ==
Event	Gold	Silver	Bronze
Mistral (sailboard)	Carlos Espínola; Argentina	Michael Gebhardt; United States	Murray Duncan McCaig; Canada
Laser Standard	Robert Scheidt; Brazil	Santiago Raúl Lange; Argentina	Jason Rhodes; Canada
470	Cuba; Pedro Luis Fernandez; Angel Alfredo Jiminez	United States; Michael Sturman; Robert Little	Argentina; Martín Billoch; Juan Pablo Zizzi

== Women's events ==
Event	Gold	Silver	Bronze
Mistral (sailboard)	Caroll-Ann Alie; Canada	Lisa Neuburger; Virgin Islands	Lanee Butler; United States
Laser Radial	Maria Betina Marcone; Argentina	Jennifer Coolidge; United States	Maria Krahe; Brazil
Europe	Márcia Pellicano; Brazil	Kimberly Logan; United States	Paula Lewin; Bermuda
470	Canada; Penny Davis; Leigh Pearson	United States; Jody Swanson; Debbie Hopkins	Argentina; Maria Sesto; Consuelo Monsegur

== Open events ==
Event	Gold	Silver	Bronze
Snipe	Cuba; Nelido Manzo Lopez; Octavio Lorenzo Valdés	Uruguay; Roberto Fabini Belhot; Ricardo Fabini Belhot	Argentina; Guillermo Pedro Parada; Gonzalo Jorge Martínez
Lightning	Chile; Alberto Gonzalez Mas; Cristian Herman Sanhueza; German Schacht Verdugo	Brazil; Claudio Biekarck; Gunnar Ficker; Marcelo Batista Silva	Argentina; Alejandro Juan Colla; Alejandro Noe; Diego Hector Ruddy
J/24	United States; Paul Foerster; Robert Johnston; Troy Lawson; John Bartlett	Virgin Islands; Peter Holmberg; Maurice Krug; Christian Rosenberg; Christofer Neil	Argentina; Franciso Jose Campero; Ezequiel Mendonca Gaona; Santiago Morixe; Gonzalo Campero

== Medal table ==
Place	Nation	Gold medal	Silver medal	Bronze medal	Total
1	Argentina	2	1	5	8
2	Brazil	2	1	1	4
3	Cuba	2	0	0	2
4	United States	1	5	1	7
5	Canada	2	0	2	4
6	Chile	1	0	0	1
7	Virgin Islands	0	2	0	2
8	Uruguay	0	1	0	1
9	Bermuda	0	0	1	1
Total		10	10	10	30
