= Coconut Grove Sailing Club =

Sailing club in Miami, Florida, US

Coordinates: 25°43′33.5″N 80°14′21.5″W

- Burgee
- Short name: CGSC
- Founded: 1946
- Location: 2990 S Bayshore Dr, Miami FL 33133 United States
- Website: www.cgsc.org

Coconut Grove Sailing Club is a sailing club located in the Coconut Grove neighborhood of Miami, Florida (United States).

CGSC is one of the five members of the Biscayne Bay Yacht Racing Association, together with Biscayne Bay Yacht Club, Coral Reef Yacht Club, Key Biscayne Yacht Club and Miami Yacht Club.

== Regattas ==
It's one of the hosts of US Sailing’s premier events: the Sailing World Cup Miami, the only North American regatta to be included in World Sailing’s World Cup series since 2008.

CGSC hosted the Snipe Western Hemisphere & Orient Championship in 2006, and has been the longtime host of the Don Q Snipe Regatta.

CGSC is also one of the hosts of the popular Melges 20 Winter Series Circuit.

== Sailors ==
Gonzalo Diaz, who earned a silver medal for Cuba at the 1959 Pan American Games, and his son Augie Diaz, Star and Snipe world champion who received the ICSA College Sailor of the Year and the US Sailor of the Year awards in 1974 and 2003 respectively, are CGSC members. Other notable members are:

-David Hughes, American 470 sailor

== Fleets ==
At the present time the club is home of the following One-Design racing fleets:

- Performance Handicap Racing Fleet
- Pearson Ensign
- Flying Scot
- Snipe
- Sunfish
- Beneteau
- Melges 20
