= Jorge Brauer =

Argentine sailor

Personal information
- Nationality: Argentine
- Born: 19 November 1913; Montevideo, Uruguay
- Died: 4 December 1992 (aged 79)

Sport
- Sport: Sailing

Jorge Brauer (19 November 1913 – 4 December 1992) was an Argentine sailor. He competed at the 1948 Summer Olympics and the 1952 Summer Olympics. He was second at the Snipe Worlds in 1947.
