= Gabriel Laiseca =

Spanish sailor (1936–2025)

Personal information
- Nationality: Spanish
- Born: 28 June 1936; Las Arenas, Spain
- Died: 13 April 2025 (aged 88)

Sport
- Sport: Sailing

Gabriel Laiseca (28 June 1936 – 13 April 2025) was a Spanish sailor. He competed in the Flying Dutchman event at the 1960 Summer Olympics. Laiseca died on 13 April 2025, at the age of 88.
