= Yacht Club Uruguayo =

- Burgee
- Founded: 1906
- Location: Montevideo, Uruguay
- Website: www.ycu.org.uy

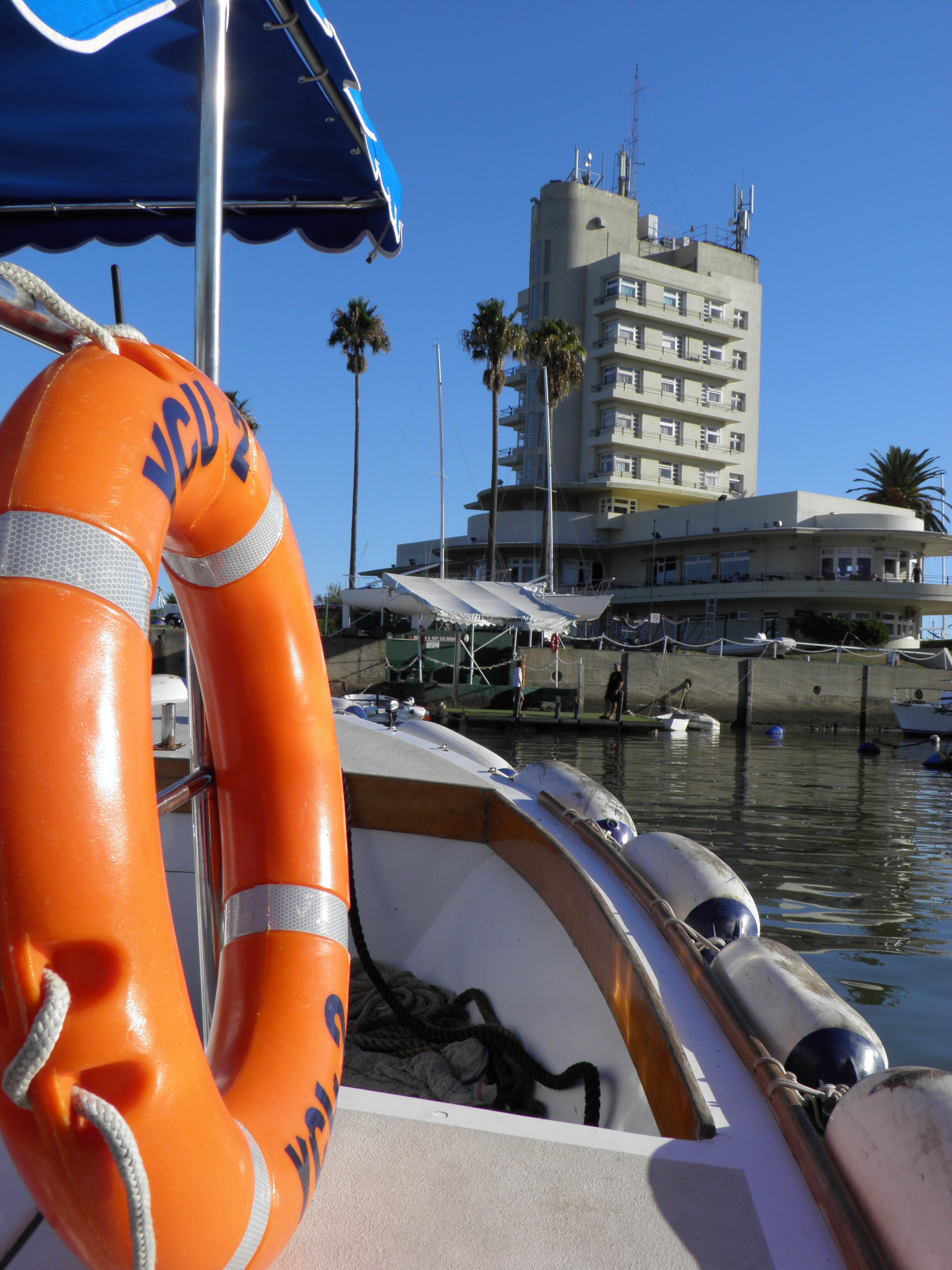
Yacht Club from embarking boat

The Yacht Club Uruguayo is situated in the city of Montevideo and it officially represents the International Sailing Federation (ISAF) in Uruguay.

== History ==
In 1906, a group of young sailors founded the Uruguayan Yacht Club in Montevideo's bay in order to promote sailing in the region. Years later the club moved to Buceo's bay and in 1939, the club consolidated its presence with the construction of an eight-story building. Architects Jorge Herrán and Luis Crespi designed the boat-shaped building which, since 1997, has been considered part of Uruguay's historical legacy. Late in the 20th century, the yacht club incorporated branches in Punta del Este and Santiago Vázquez.

The club's ensign is Uruguay's national flag according to a constitutional decree approved on 11 August 1908. The club has an emblem with a sun and an anchor and a burgee with four blue stripes on white and a red anchor at the canton.

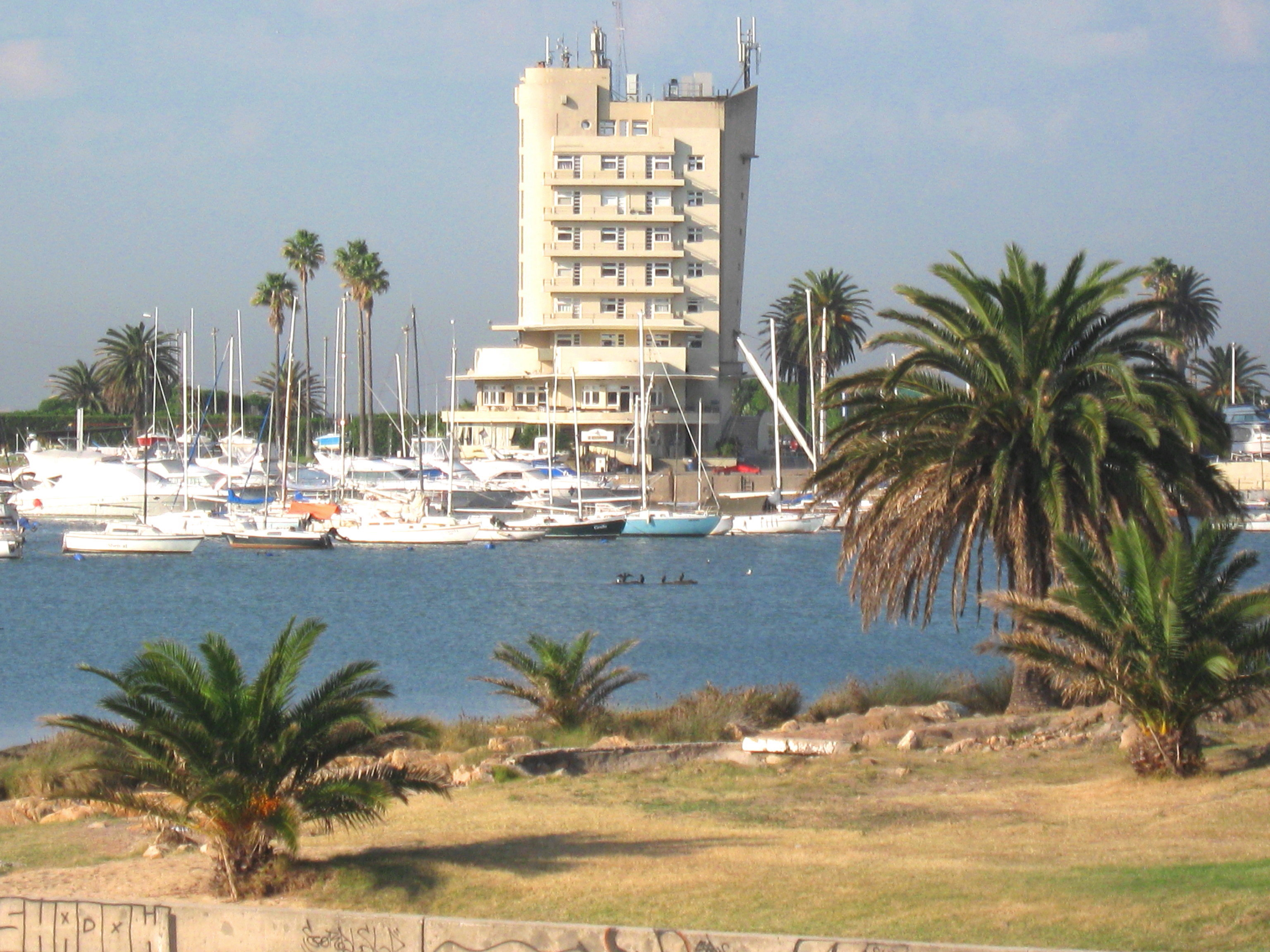
Yacht Club

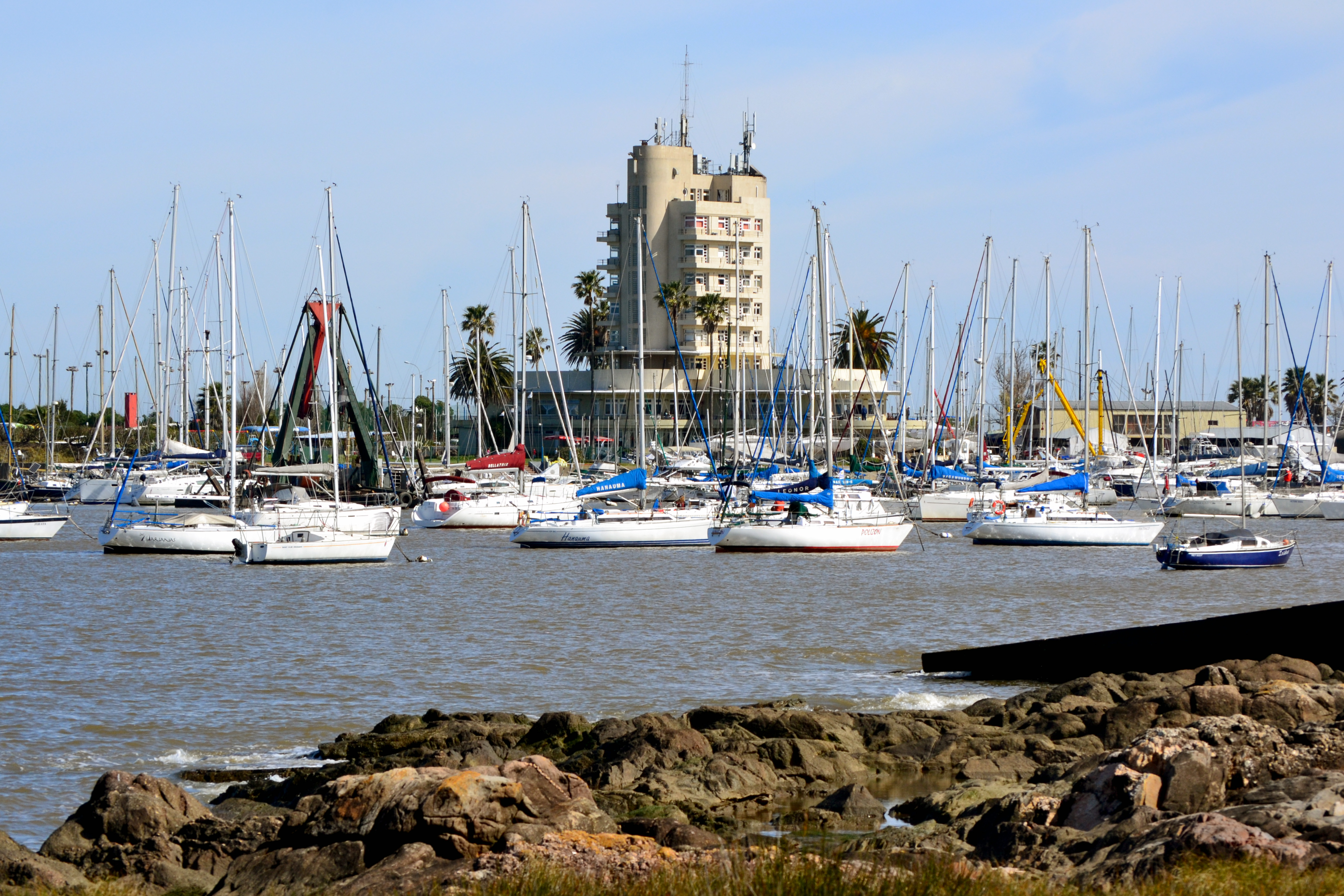
Yacht Club Uruguayo

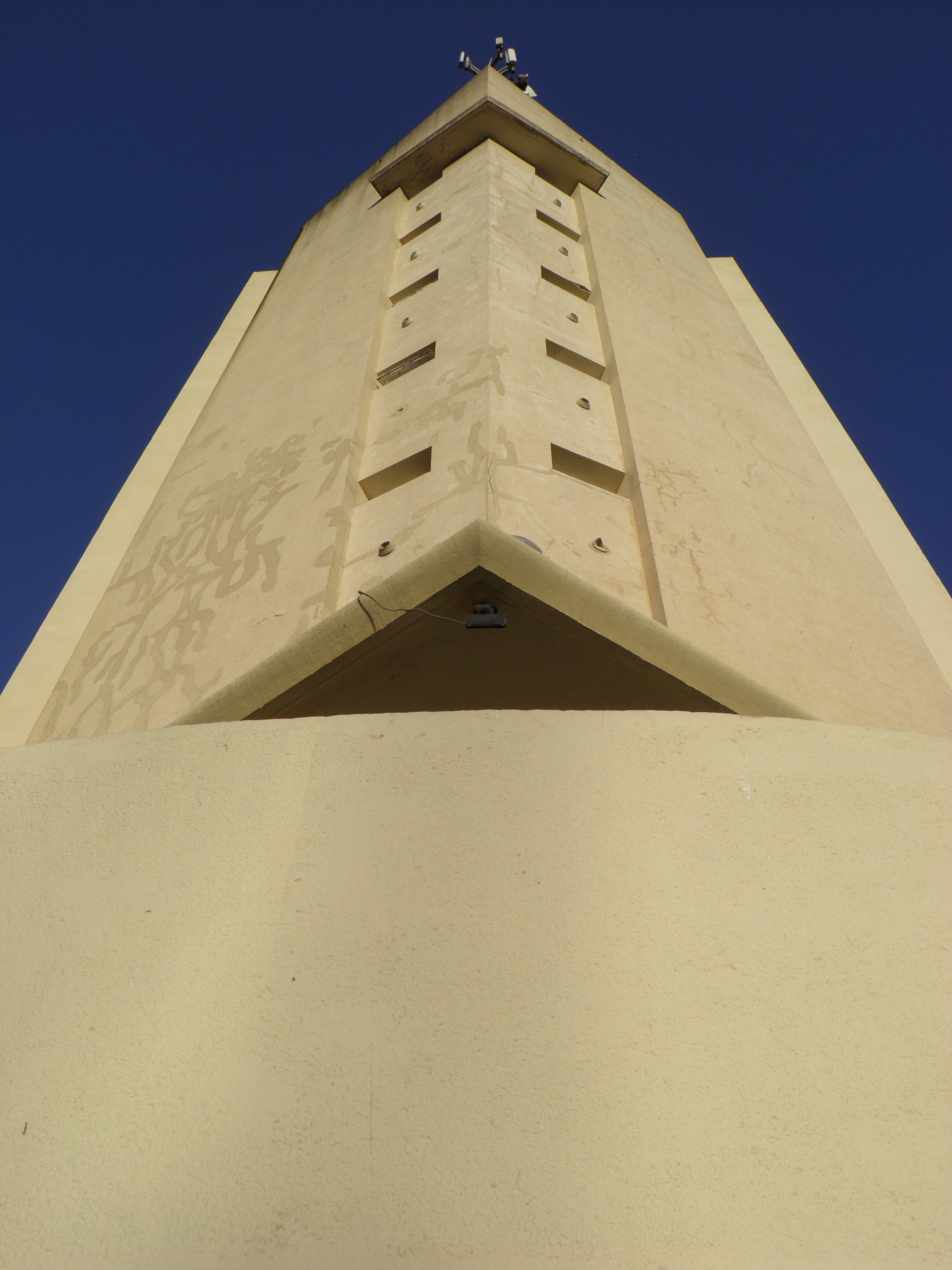
The front of the club's building resembling the bow of a boat

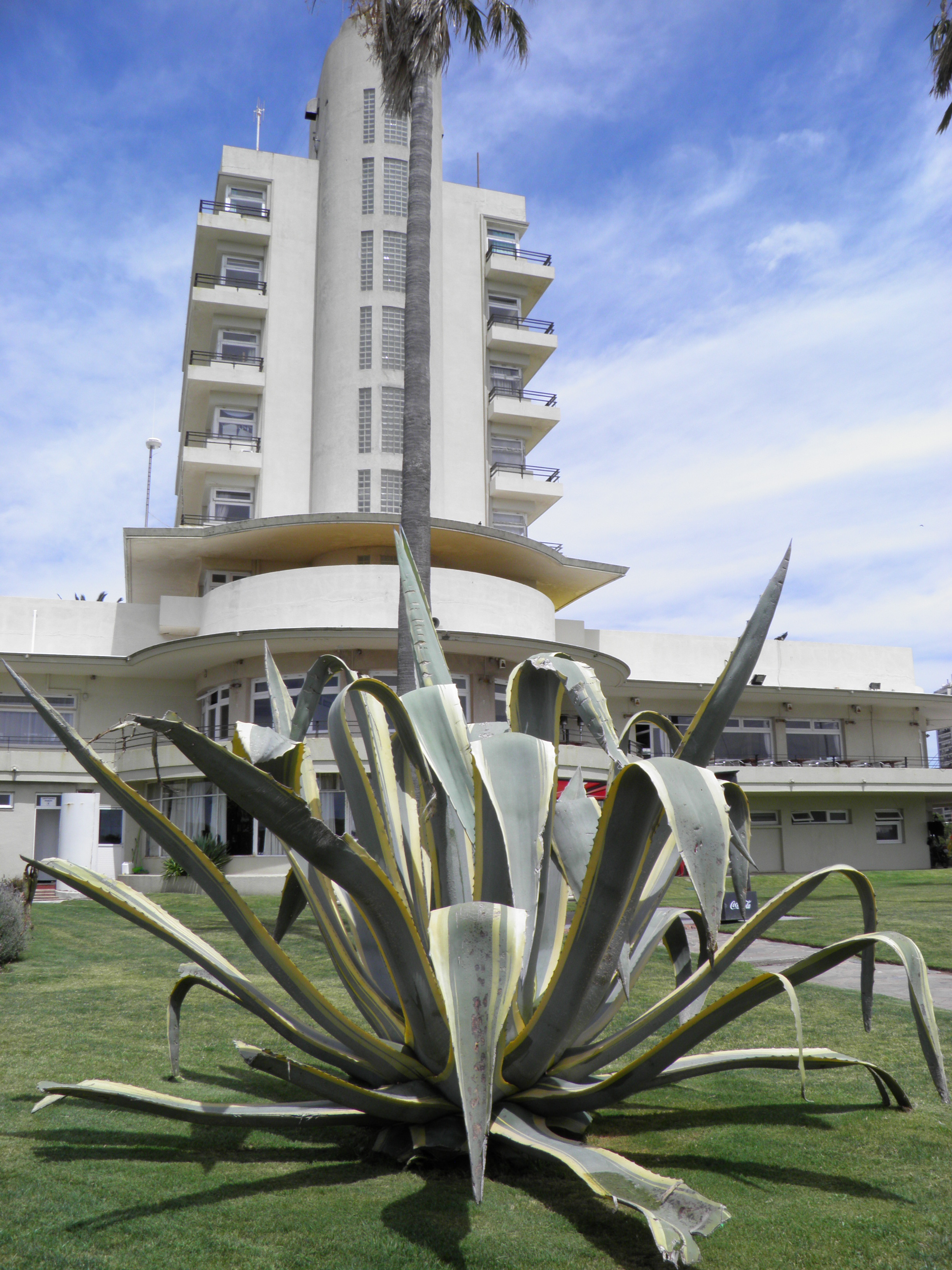
The back part of the building resembling the stern

== International relations ==
The club started its international relations in 1909 with the arrival of sailors from the Yacht Club Argentino. Since then, the yacht club promotes international contacts with clubs around the world and encourages sailors to participate in worldwide sailing events such as world and regional sailing championships and Olympic games. The Yacht Club Uruguayo is the recognized national member for Uruguay of the International Sailing Federation.

== Club's facilities ==
The club is located in the center of Montevideo. The port is 10 minutes from downtown and 15 minutes from Aeropuerto Internacional de Carrasco airport. The club can hold over 300 boats and has embarkation services 24 hours a day. The yacht club also has two open swimming pools, six tennis courts, three football five courts and a football seven court.
