= Club Náutico San Isidro =

Argentine sailing club

- Burgee
- Short name: CNSI
- Founded: February 26, 1910; 115 years ago
- Location: San Isidro, Argentina
- Commodore: Raul Montegrande
- Website: http://www.cnsi.org.ar/

The San Isidro Nautical Club (Spanish: Club Náutico San Isidro), is a sailing club located in San Isidro, Buenos Aires.

== History ==
The San Isidro Nautical Club was founded on February 26, 1910. When Che Guevara was a young boy, his parents were members in the club and they regularly took him there to swim at the club's beaches.

== Facilities ==
The club offers a variety of facilities. Their most popular facilities are their docking facilities which members of the club can purchase in order to dock their boat. The club also offers other facilities to its members including clay tennis courts, football, squash courts, volleyball courts, gymnastics facilities, beaches, and an 18-hole golf course.

== See also ==
- List of yacht clubs
- Yacht club
