= Snipe World Championships =

International sailing regattas

The Snipe World Championships are international sailing regattas in the Snipe International class organized by the Snipe Class International Racing Association (SCIRA) and the International Sailing Federation (ISAF).

There are four different championships: Open, Juniors, Women's and Masters.

== History ==
In 1949, the decision was made to hold the championship, that took place every year except during World War II (1943–1944), every two years, and to hold Hemisphere Championships (Europe and Africa championship and Western Hemisphere & Orient Championship) and World Championships in alternate years.

in 1973, a Junior World Championship independent event was created. In 1986 the World Masters Championship and in 1994 the Women's World Championship were added.

== Open Worlds ==
The Open Snipe World Championship, also known as senior worlds, or just World Championship, The term open refers to the open gender policy. The best sailors from each nations are eligible to compete with a per name quota system used. The primary trophies raced for are Commodore Hub E. Isaacks, O'Leary and the Earl Elms Perpetual Trophy are awarded.

== Women's World Championship ==
The Women's World Championship, where the Roy Yamaguchi Memorial Trophy is awarded to the winning skipper and her crew, is held every 2 years in even numbered years.

== Youth World Championship ==
The Junior/Youth World Championship is open to contestants under 22 years old (not having their 22nd birthday during the calendar year the regatta is held). It is held every 2 years in odd numbered years. The primary trophy awarded to the winning helm is the Vieri Lasinio Di Castelvero Trophy.

All skippers must be citizens or bonafide residents for at least one year, of the country they represent. Must have 3 countries to conduct a championship. Entries are limited to:

- 10 skippers per country.
- One additional skipper from the host country, providing that it does not have among its other representatives the Junior World, Junior European or Junior WH&O Champion.
- Current Junior World Champion, if he is otherwise eligible
- Junior European Champion, if he is otherwise eligible
- First Junior from Western Hemisphere & Orient Championship, if he is otherwise eligible

== Masters World Championship ==
The Masters World Championship, where the Id Crook Memorial Trophy is awarded to the winning skipper and crew, is held every 2 years in even numbered years. It is open to boats where the skipper must be at least 50 years of age in the year of the regatta and the combined age of skipper and crew must be at least 80 years in the year of the regatta.
