= Snipe (dinghy) =

Sailboat class

Development
- Designer: William F. Crosby
- Location: United States
- Year: 1931
- No. built: 31,000
- Builders: MAS Marine; Jibetech; Diemer; Zeltic; Tsujido; Persson Marine Japan
- Role: One design racer

Boat
- Displacement: 380 lb (172 kg)
- Draft: 3.25 ft (0.99 m) with daggerboard down

Hull
- Type: monohull
- Construction: fiberglass
- LOA: 15.50 ft (4.72 m)
- LWL: 12.67 ft (3.86 m)
- Beam: 5.00 ft (1.52 m)

Hull appendages
- Keel: daggerboard
- Rudder: transom-mounted rudder

Rig
- Rig type: Bermuda rig

Sails
- Sailplan: fractional rigged sloop
- Total sail area: 128.00 sq ft (11.892 m^{2})

Racing
- Class association: SCIRA

Rating
- D-PN: 91.9
- RYA PN: 1117

The Snipe is an American sailing dinghy that was designed by William F. Crosby as a one design racer and first built in 1931.

The boat is a World Sailing recognized international class.

Sailboatdata.com summarizes the design as "one of the most popular sailing dinghies ever. (In its heyday, the largest sailboat racing class). Origins in the US. Built, sailed and raced around the world to this day."

== Production ==
In the past the design has built by Grampian Marine in Canada; Eichenlaub Boat Co., Jack A. Helms Co., Lofland Sail-craft, Nickels Boat Works and W. D. Schock Corp in the United States; Cantiere Nautico Lillia in Italy; Chantier Aubin in France and AX Boats in Spain.

W. D. Schock Corp records indicate that they built 165 boats between 1963 and 1970.

Today the boat is built by Jibetech in the United States, Zeltic in Spain and DB Marine in Italy.

More than 31,000 Snipes have been delivered.

== Design ==
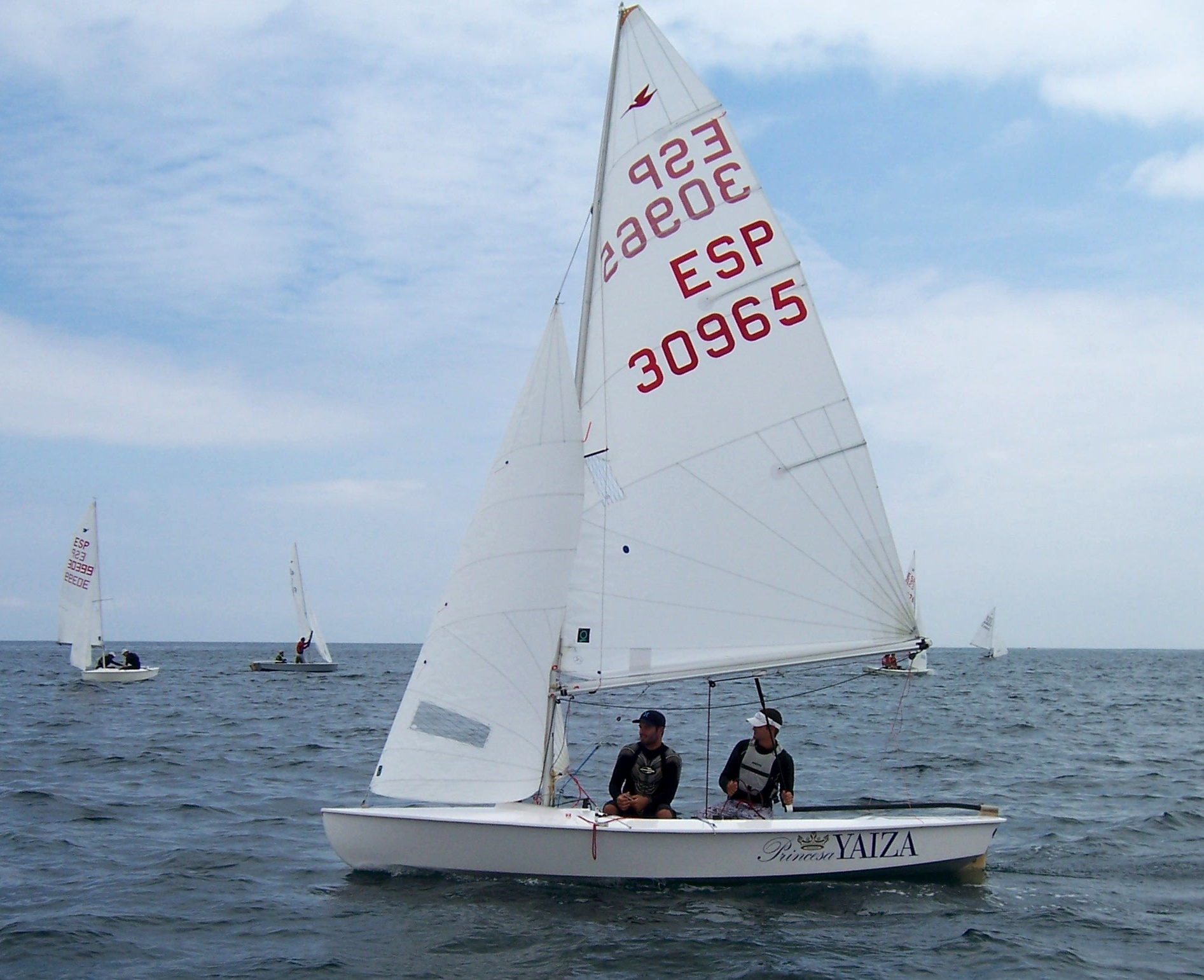
A Snipe sailing

The Snipe is a racing sailboat, with early examples built with wooden hulls and more recent ones with hulls made from fiberglass. It has a fractional sloop rig, a spooned raked stem, an angled transom, a transom-hung rudder controlled by a tiller with an extension and a retractable daggerboard. It displaces 380 lb (172 kg).

The boat has a draft of 3.25 ft (0.99 m) with the daggerboard extended and 6 in (15 cm) with it retracted, allowing operation in shallow water, beaching or ground transportation on a trailer.

For sailing downwind the design may be equipped with a whisker pole to hold the jib out, but neither a spinnaker nor a crew trapeze are permitted in the class rules.

The boat has a Portsmouth Yardstick D-PN handicap of 91.9 and an RYA-PN of 1117.

== Operational history ==
The boat is supported by an active class club that organizes racing events, the Snipe Class International Racing Association (SCIRA), which has a large number of Snipe fleets across many countries.

In an August 1959 review for Sports Illustrated, Thomas Atkinson reported, "Unlike many class boats which were designed as pure racing machines, however, the Snipe offers more than speed and thrills. It is a miniature yacht as well as a racing boat, and despite the fact that newer and faster classes continually appear, the Snipe is more in demand than ever. Snipes, in fact, are so much fun they have become the most popular boat in the world. Today there are more than 8,000 of the little 15-footers in commission, sailing out of 250 active racing fleets from Trieste to Tokyo and even in such Iron Curtain countries as Poland, and last year over 400 more were added to the class."

=== Events ===
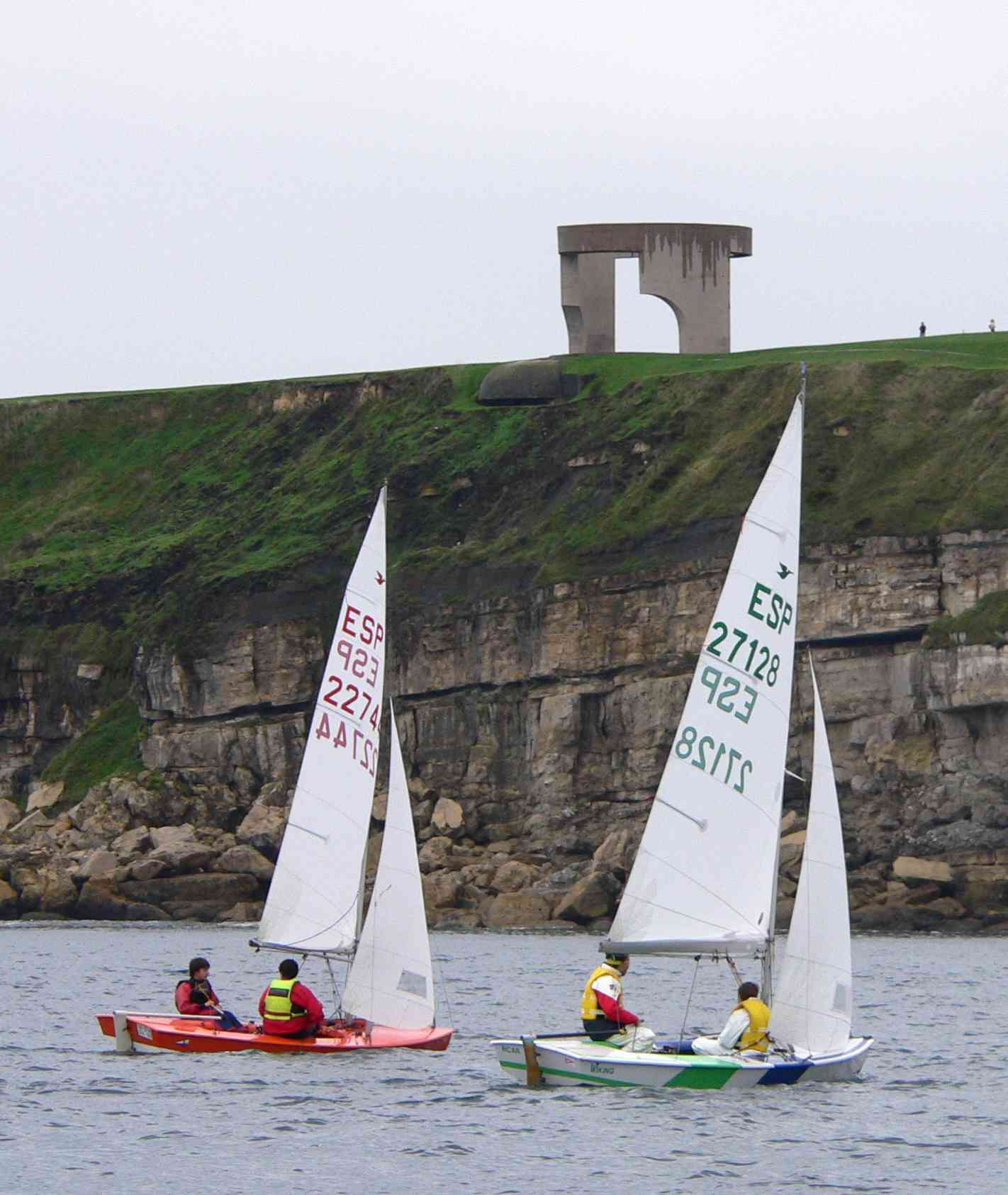
Snipe sailing in northern Spain

- Snipe World Championships
- Snipe European Championship
- Snipe North American Championship
- Snipe South American Championship
- Snipe Western Hemisphere & Orient Championship
- Sailing at the 2011 Pan American Games – Snipe
- Sailing at the 2015 Pan American Games – Snipe
- United States Snipe National Championship

== See also ==
- List of sailing boat types
