= Dominguinhos =

Brazilian singer (1941–2013)

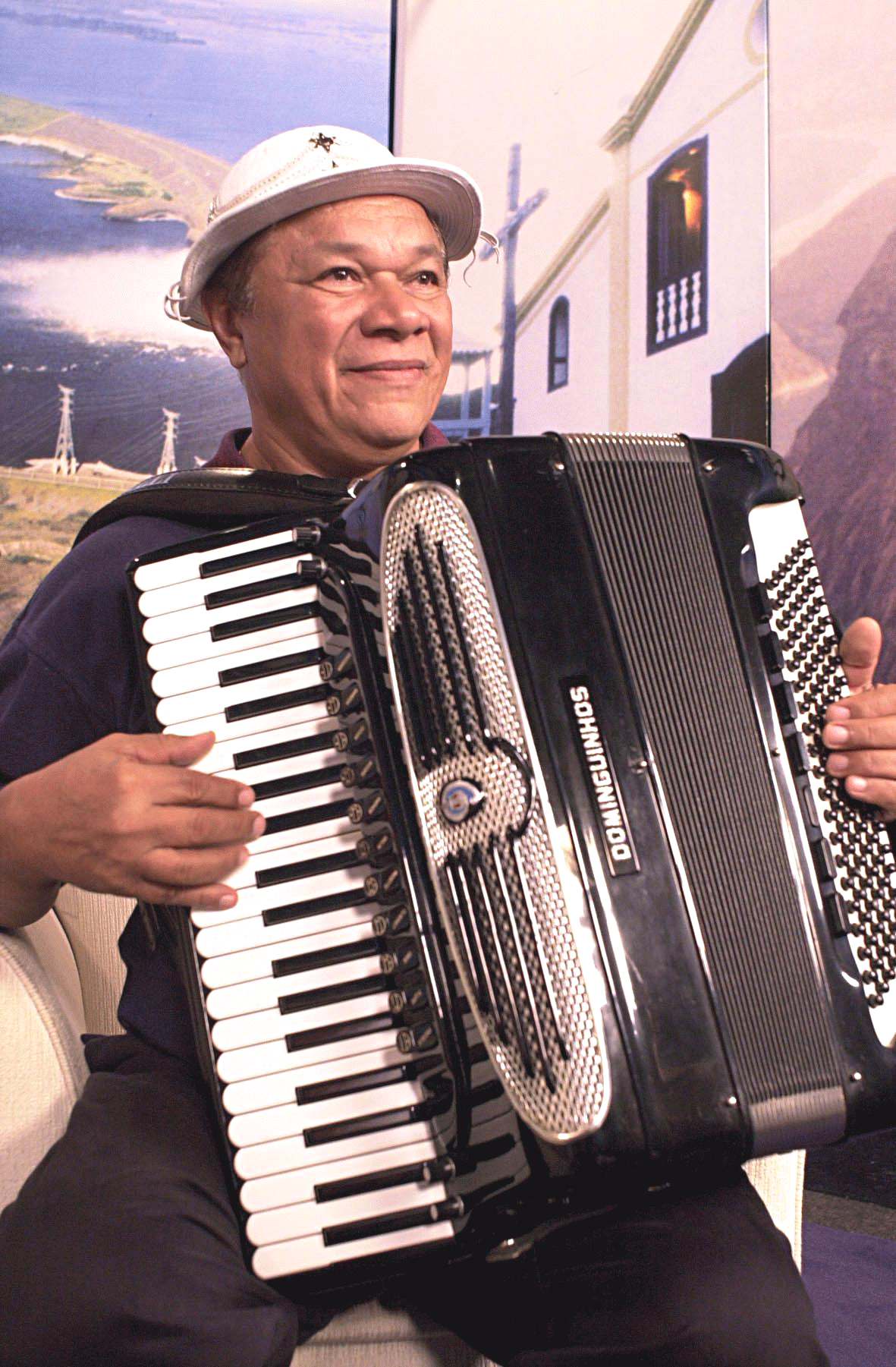

Background information
- Born: José Domingos de Morais; 12 February 1941; Garanhuns, Pernambuco, Brazil
- Died: 23 July 2013 (aged 72) São Paulo, São Paulo, Brazil
- Genres: MPB, forró, baião, choro, samba
- Instruments: Vocals; accordion
- Labels: Caravelas Records, BMG, Eldorado Records, Sony BMG, Sony Music, Velas Records, Warner Bros. Records, WEA, WM Recordings, Continental Records
- Website: www.dominguinhos.art.br

José Domingos de Morais (12 February 1941 – 23 July 2013), better known as Dominguinhos, was a Brazilian composer, accordionist and singer. His principal musical influences were the music of Luiz Gonzaga, Forró and in general the music of the Sertão in the Brazilian Northeast. He further developed this typical Brazilian musical style, born out of the European, African and Indian influences in north-eastern Brazil, creating a unique style of Brazilian Popular Music.

He has performed with musicians such as Luiz Gonzaga, Caetano Veloso, Gilberto Gil, Gal Costa (with whom he toured in Midem), Zé Ramalho, Toquinho, Elba Ramalho, Yamandu Costa, and Maria Bethânia. Some of his hits were recorded by Bethânia, Gil, Chico Buarque, Elba Ramalho, and Fagner. In 1997 Dominguinhos wrote the soundtrack of the film O Cangaceiro and participated in the Brazilian documentary "O Milagre de Santa Luzia" on the Brazilian accordion music. During his lifetime, Dominguinhos received various prizes and awards, including the Latin Grammy in 2002 for his album "Chegando de mansinho".

== Biography ==
José Domingos de Morais was born in the agreste of Pernambuco, in the town of Garanhuns, on 12 February 1941. Coming from a humble background, his father, Mestre Chicão, was a well-known accordionist and accordion tuner. Dominguinhos became interested in music at an early age, starting to play accordion at six years of age, when he received a small eight-bass-accordion and started to play on fairs and in front of hotels, to earn some money with his two brothers, forming the trio "Os Três Pinguins" (The Three Penguins). He practised accordion for hours and soon became a virtuoso on the 48, 80 and 120 bass accordions, starting to play professionally already as a teenager.

In 1950, with nine years of age, he met Luiz Gonzaga while playing in front of the hotel where Luiz Gonzaga was staying, who was impressed by his talent. He invited the young Dominguinhos to come with him to Rio de Janeiro. Dominguinhos went only in 1954, at age thirteen, together with his father and his two brothers, moving to the town of Nilópolis, near Rio de Janeiro. When he met there with Luiz Gonzaga, he received from him an accordion as a present, and started to play with Luiz Gonzaga in shows throughout Brazil and participating in studio recordings. In 1967, during one of these tours, he meets the Forró singer Anastácia (artistic name of Lucinete Ferreira), who he marries and went on to form an artistic partnership with, which lasted eleven years. At that time Dominguinhos already had a son, Mauro, born in 1960, from his first marriage. In 1976, Dominguinhos meets the singer Guadalupe Mendonça, his third marriage, with whom he had a daughter Liv. They eventually separated, but continued a friendship until the death of Dominguinhos.

As he started to play with Luiz Gonzaga, he gained a reputation as an accordionist and singer and started to have close contact with musicians from the Bossa Nova movement. He worked together with other well-known Brazilian musicians, such as Gilberto Gil, Maria Bethânia, Elba Ramalho and Toquinho, and eventually consolidated an own musical career, developing further the musical styles of the North East of Brazil, and incorporating influences of bossa nova, jazz and pop.

In December 2012, Dominguinhos was taken to a hospital in Recife with cardiac dysrhythmia and respiratory tract infection. He was later transferred to the Syrian-Lebanese Hospital, in São Paulo, where his coma was described as permanent and doctors said there were no hopes he will return and wake up again.

Despite the declarations of his son, Dominguinhos was still fighting for his life. He was minimally conscious, able to understand his condition and the ones who surrounded him at the hospital.

Dominguinhos died on 23 July 2013, due to infectious and cardiac complications, according to the Sírio-Libanês Hospital in São Paulo.

He was the subject of Dominguinhos, a 2014 documentary film by Mariana Aydar, Joaquim Castro and Eduardo Nazarian.

== Personal life ==
Dominguinhos grandson, Netinho, is a professional footballer in Brazil.

== Discography ==
- 1964 – Fim de Festa
- 1965 – Cheinho de Molho
- 1966 – 13 de Dezembro
- 1973 – Lamento de Caboclo
- 1973 – Tudo Azul
- 1973 – Festa no Sertão
- 1974 – Dominguinhos e Seu Accordeon
- 1975 – Forró de Dominguinhos (Velas Records)
- 1976 – Domingo, Menino Dominguinhos
- 1977 – Oi, Lá Vou Eu
- 1978 – Oxente Dominguinhos
- 1979 – Após Tá Certo
- 1980 – Quem me Levará Sou Eu
- 1981 – Querubim
- 1982 – A Maravilhosa Música Brasileira
- 1982 – Simplicidade
- 1982 – Dominguinhos e Sua Sanfona
- 1983 – Festejo e Alegria
- 1985 – Isso Aqui Tá Bom Demais
- 1986 – Gostoso Demais
- 1987 – Seu Domingos
- 1988 – É Isso Aí! Simples Como a Vida
- 1989 – Veredas Nordestinas
- 1990 – Aqui Tá Ficando Bom
- 1991 – Dominguinhos é Brasil
- 1992 – Garanhuns
- 1993 – O Trinado do Trovão
- 1994 – Choro Chorado (Continental Records)
- 1994 – Nas Quebradas do Sertão
- 1995 – Dominguinhos é Tradição (Continental Records)
- 1996 – Pé de Poeira
- 1997 – Dominguinhos & Convidados Cantam Luiz Gonzaga (Velas Records)
- 1998 – Nas Costas do Brasil (Velas Records)
- 1999 – Você Vai Ver o Que é Bom (Universal Music)
- 2001 – Dominguinhos ao vivo (Caravelas Records)
- 2001 – Lembrando de Você (Sony Music)
- 2002 – Chegando de Mansinho (Caravelas Records)
- 2004 – Cada um Belisca um Pouco (with Sivuca and Oswaldinho do Acordeom, Biscoito Fino)
- 2005 – Elba Ramalho & Dominguinhos
- 2006 – Conterrâneos (Eldorado Records)
- 2008 – Yamandu + Dominguinhos
