= Pagode Russo =

Song by Luiz Gonzaga

from the album Danado de Bom
- Released: 1984
- Genre: Forró
- Length: 2:00
- Label: RCA
- Songwriters: Luiz Gonzaga; João Silva

Music video
- "Pagode Russo" on YouTube

"Pagode Russo" is a forró song composed in 1946 by Luiz Gonzaga and João Silva, and released on the album Danado de Bom in 1984. It is a song that pays homage to the Cossacks and plays with the East Slavic trepak rhythm within the time signature of a Brazilian baião.

== Composition and reception ==
In an interview for the 2012 documentary Hoje É Dia de Luiz, João Silva said that he and Luiz Gonzaga came up with the idea for the song when they saw two "Europeans" wearing "little skirts and bagpipes" on a beach. Some theorize that Silva and Gonzaga mistook them for Cossacks, a people from Eastern Europe, as it is more likely that the two individuals were wearing traditional Scottish attire. In the song, the singer says that he dreamed he was at the fictional nightclub Cossacou in Moscow, where he started dancing a 'Russian pagode' (the trepak) and compares the dance to Pernambuco's frevo.

The song was originally released in 1947 as an instrumental, however, it only became a hit in Brazil in 1984, when it was rerecorded with lyrics by Luiz Gonzaga and João Silva on the album Danado de Bom. According to a survey by the Central Collection and Distribution Office of Paraíba, published in 2010, the song 'Pagode Russo' is one of the most played songs at Festas Juninas in Brazil.

== Other versions ==
The song was rerecorded by several Brazilian artists, such as Zeca Baleiro on his album Vô Imbolá (1999), and Lenine and Frejat on the live album Casa do Forró (1998). These artists mixed the baião rhythm with Brazilian rock. The electronic forró band Mastruz com Leite also recorded a version of this song in 1996 on their album No Forró do Gonzagão.
