= Dominguinhos ao vivo =

Live album by Dominguinhos
- Released: 2001
- Genre: Forró, Baião
- Length: 54:41
- Label: Velas

Professional ratings
Review scores
| Source | Rating |
|---|---|
| Allmusic | 4.5/5 stars |
| Cliquemusic | 3/5 stars |

Dominguinhos ao vivo is a 2001 live album recorded by the Brazilian singer and composer Dominguinhos. Recorded in Sesc Pompéia Theatre, São Paulo, Brazil, the album presents many of the best hits of his career, including his partnerships with Chico Buarque and Gilberto Gil

== Track listing ==
| # | Title | Songwriters | Length |
|---|---|---|---|
| 1. | "De volta pro aconchego" | Dominguinhos, Nando Cordel | |
| | "Gostoso demais" | Dominguinhos, Nando Cordel | |
| | "Tenho sede" | Anastácia, Dominguinhos | 7:37 |
| 2. | "Chega, morena" | Dominguinhos, Climério, Guadalupe | |
| | "Numa sala de reboco" | Luiz Gonzaga, José Marcolino | 2:33 |
| 3. | "Eu me lembro" | Dominguinhos, Anastácia | |
| | "Zé do Rock" | João Silva, Raymundo Evangelista | 3:36 |
| 4. | "Doidinho, doidinho" | Dominguinhos, Anastácia | 1:43 |
| 5. | "Gandaiera" | João Silva | |
| | "No puladinho" | Nando Cordel, Dominguinhos | |
| | "Derramaro o gai" | Luiz Gonzaga, Zé Dantas | 4:00 |
| 6. | "Retrato da vida" | Djavan, Dominguinhos | 2:30 |
| 7. | "Tantas palavras" | Chico Buarque, Dominguinhos | 3:41 |
| 8. | "Xote da navegação" | Chico Buarque, Dominguinhos | 2:49 |
| 9. | "Contrato de separação" | Dominguinhos, Anastácia | 3:16 |
| 10. | "Lamento sertanejo" | Dominguinhos, Gilberto Gil | 5:30 |
| 11. | "Abri a porta" | Dominguinhos, Gilberto Gil | 2:28 |
| 12. | "Estação" | Clodô, Dominguinhos | 2:09 |
| 13. | "Balance eu" | Nestor de Holanda, Luiz Gonzaga | 2:24 |
| 14. | "Riacho do navio" | Luiz Gonzaga, Zé Dantas | |
| | "A vida do viajante" | Luiz Gonzaga, Hervê Cordovil | 3:46 |
| 15. | "Eu só quero um xodó" | Dominguinhos, Anastácia | 2:57 |
| 16. | "Alegria de pé de serra" | Dominguinhos, Anastácia | |
| | "Isso aqui tá bom demais" | Dominguinhos, Nando Cordel | |
| | "Pedras que cantam" | Dominguinhos, Fausto Nilo | 3:37 |

== Personnel ==
- Dominguinhos: vocals and accordion
