= Portage Lakes, Ohio =

- Census-designated place
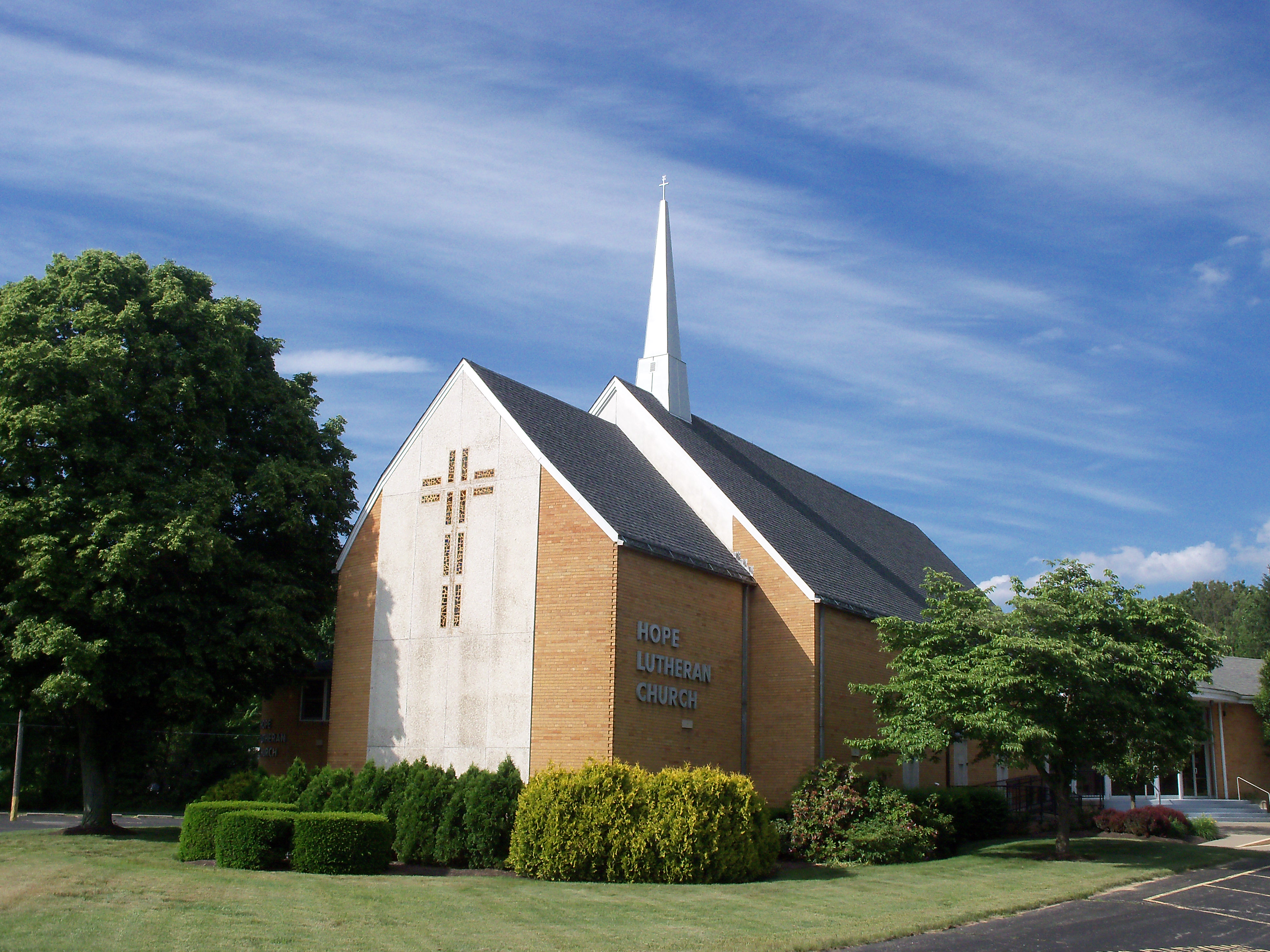
- Hope Lutheran Church (1953) on Portage Lakes Drive

- Location in Summit County and the state of Ohio.
- Coordinates: 40°59′50″N 81°31′59″W
- Country: United States
- State: Ohio
- County: Summit

Area
  - Total: 4.94 sq mi (12.80 km^{2})
  - Land: 3.96 sq mi (10.25 km^{2})
  - Water: 0.98 sq mi (2.54 km^{2})
- Elevation: 965 ft (294 m)

Population (2020)
  - Total: 6,407
  - Density: 1,618.4/sq mi (624.86/km^{2})
- Time zone: UTC-5 (Eastern (EST))
  - Summer (DST): UTC-4 (EDT)
- ZIP code: 44319
- Area codes: 234 and 330
- FIPS code: 39-64136
- GNIS feature ID: 2393195

Portage Lakes is a census-designated place (CDP) in Summit County, Ohio, United States. The population was 6,407 at the 2020 census. A suburb directly south of Akron, the community takes its name from the encompassing Portage Lakes.

Portage Lakes is a part of Coventry Township. The community includes Portage Lakes State Park, which features boatramps and seasonal beach swimming. Portage Lakes is part of the Akron metropolitan area and is notable as the birthplace of Rockabilly musician Bill Allen (musician).

== Geography ==
According to the United States Census Bureau, the CDP has a total area of 8.2 square miles (21 km^{2}), of which 6.6 square miles (17 km^{2}) is land and 1.6 square miles (4.1 km^{2}) (19.49%) is water.

At the 2000 census, Portage Lakes included portions of Coventry and Franklin townships. On 1 January 2005, all of Franklin Township was merged into the village of New Franklin; as a result, the CDP's Franklin Township portion is now entirely within New Franklin. Therefore, the CDP today consists of territory only in Coventry Township, as CDPs are located only in unincorporated areas.

== Demographics ==
Historical population
Census	Pop.	Note	%±
2000	9,870		—
2010	6,968		−29.4%
2020	6,407		−8.1%
U.S. Decennial Census

As of the census of 2000, there were 9,870 people, 4,195 households, and 2,751 families residing in the CDP. The population density was 1,502.0 inhabitants per square mile (579.9/km^{2}). There were 4,491 housing units at an average density of 683.4 per square mile (263.9/km^{2}). The racial makeup of the CDP was 97.79% White, 0.57% African American, 0.31% Native American, 0.31% Asian, 0.01% Pacific Islander, 0.20% from other races, and 0.80% from two or more races. Hispanic or Latino of any race were 0.58% of the population.

There were 4,195 households, out of which 24.8% had children under the age of 18 living with them, 52.3% were married couples living together, 9.3% had a female householder with no husband present, and 34.4% were non-families. 28.2% of all households were made up of individuals, and 9.7% had someone living alone who was 65 years of age or older. The average household size was 2.32 and the average family size was 2.84.

In the CDP the population was spread out, with 20.5% under the age of 18, 6.9% from 18 to 24, 29.4% from 25 to 44, 28.1% from 45 to 64, and 15.1% who were 65 years of age or older. The median age was 41 years. For every 100 females there were 98.7 males. For every 100 females age 18 and over, there were 97.6 males.

The median income for a household in the CDP was $43,698, and the median income for a family was $52,384. Males had a median income of $37,250 versus $26,279 for females. The per capita income for the CDP was $22,267. About 1.9% of families and 5.0% of the population were below the poverty line, including 3.0% of those under age 18 and 8.5% of those age 65 or over.
