= Rabeca =

Fiddle from northeastern Brazil, northern Portugal and Cape Verde

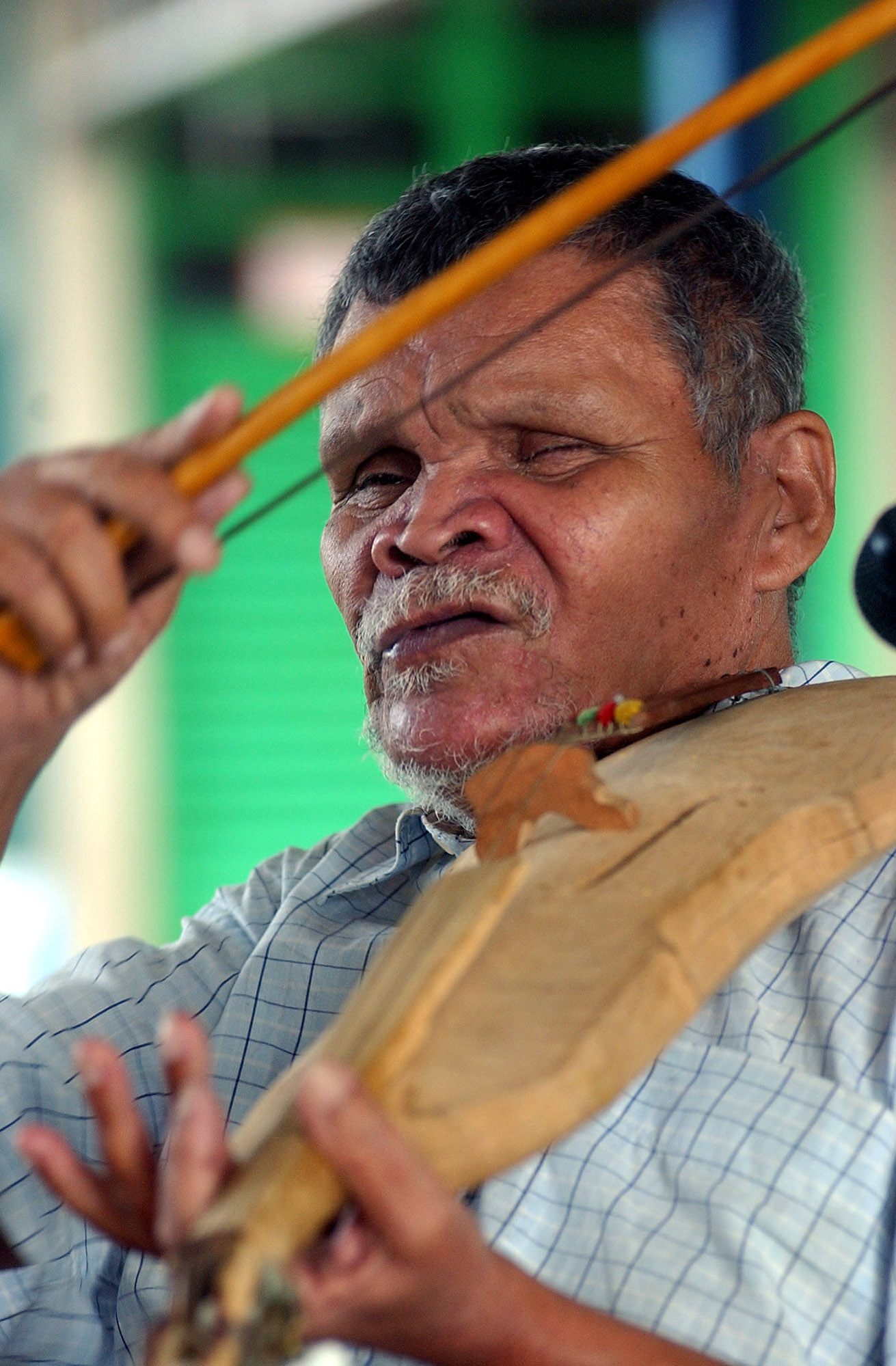
- José Oliveira, a Rabeca player from Juazeiro do Norte, Ceará, Brazil.

String instrument
- Other names: Rabeca chuleira in Portugal
- Hornbostel–Sachs classification: (Composite chordophone sounded by a bow)
- Developed: Early 16th century

Related instruments
- Violin family (fiddle, viola, cello); Viol family (includes double bass)

The rabeca, also known as rabeca chuleira, is a type of fiddle originating in Portugal. It is commonly used in Portugal, Northeastern Brazil—where it is especially prominent in Brazilian forró music—and in Cape Verde. It is descended from the medieval rebec.

== History ==
The rabeca is thought to have originated in the Entre-Douro-e-Minho region of northern Portugal, especially in the areas around Amarante during the 18th century. Rabeca have also sephardic origins.

In the Portuguese tradition, the rabeca chuleira is a short-scale variation played in village bands alongside guitars or viola braguesa, drums, triangle and, now occasionally, the gaita transmontana or the galician bagpipe. The repertoire consists of the 2/2 chula and 3/4 chamarrita.

In Portugal, the rabeca chuleira (also known as rabeca rabela, chula de Amarante, chula de Penafiel or ramaldeira depending on the region it is played with very little variation) is still widely associated with the people of Minho, Douro Litoral and, to some extent, Beira Litoral. However, it doesn't have an important popularity in the rest of the country and it has been slowly replaced by the violin in Portuguese folklore.

In the Brazilian tradition, the rabeca chuleira is simply called rabeca and is not a short-scale instrument unlike its Portuguese cousin. The Portuguese viola braguesa finds a counterpart in its Brazilian cousin, the viola caipira. In forró music, the rabeca is typically accompanied by accordion, zabumba drum, and triangle. The three primary dance rhythms of forró are the 4/4 xote, baião, and arrasta-pé.

== Tuning ==
The short-scale rabeca chuleira from Portugal is tuned an octave above the violin. The Brazilian rabeca, on the other hand, plays in the same range as a violin, but may be tuned in fourths or fifths.

== See also ==
- Rebecca (disambiguation)
- Bandolim
- Music of Portugal
- Music of Brazil
- Viola caipira
- Violino piccolo
