= Portage Lakes Yacht Club =

Private yacht club

- Burgee
- Short name: PLYC
- Founded: 1936
- Location: New Franklin, Ohio
- Website: www.sailingakron.org

The Portage Lakes Yacht Club is a private yacht club located in New Franklin, Ohio (Akron metropolitan area), on the north shore of Turkeyfoot Lake, one of the Portage Lakes.

== History ==
The Portage Lakes Yacht Club was founded March 29, 1936. First boats at the club were 16 foot scows. In 1938 the first home built Snipe arrived at PLYC and in 1939 the Snipe Fleet number 110 was formed. PLYC member Carl Zimmerman was a Past Commodore of the Snipe Class International Racing Association (SCIRA), and W. Birney Mills succeeded William Crosby as Executive Secretary and Treasurer of SCIRA. Two trophies given by the PLYC to the Association are still being awarded:

1. The Portage Lakes Yacht Club Trophy to the winning crew of the US National Championship.
2. The Birney Mills Memorial Trophy to the winning skipper of the North American Championship.

In 1940, an Interlake was brought to the club and soon a few members of the Snipe Fleet decided to order Interlakes, forming Fleet number 6 of the Interlake Sailing Class Association.
