= Mike Phillips (basketball, born 1956) =

American basketball player (1956–2015)

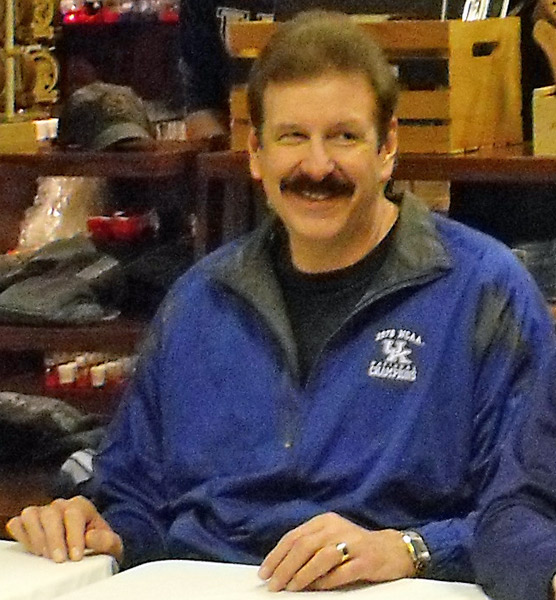
- Phillips at an autograph signing in 2013

Personal information
- Born: March 24, 1956 Akron, Ohio, U.S.
- Died: April 25, 2015 (aged 59) Madisonville, Kentucky, U.S.
- Listed height: 6 ft 10 in (2.08 m)
- Listed weight: 235 lb (107 kg)

Career information
- High school: Manchester (New Franklin, Ohio)
- College: Kentucky (1974–1978)
- NBA draft: 1978: 3rd round, 45th overall pick
- Drafted by: New Jersey Nets
- Playing career: 1979–1990
- Position: Center

Career history
- 1979–1980: CB Mollet
- 1980–1982: FC Barcelona
- 1982–1985: Licor 43
- 1985–1987: RCD Español
- 1987–1988: Fórum Valladolid
- 1988–1989: Cacaolat Granollers
- 1989–1990: CB Juver Murcia

Career highlights
- NCAA champion (1978); Second-team All-SEC (1976); 2× Third-team All-SEC (1977, 1978)
- Stats at Basketball Reference

Michael Charles Phillips (March 24, 1956 – April 25, 2015) was an American professional basketball player. At a height of 6 feet 10 inches (2.08 m), he played at the center position. He played professionally for eleven years in Spain, including six years in Spain's top-tier level league, the Liga ACB.

== High school ==
Phillips attended and played basketball at Manchester High School, in New Franklin, Ohio, from 1970 to 1974. He helped lead Manchester to the Ohio state AA basketball title in 1974 with a 26–0 record. His 2,573 career points rank 7th most in Ohio high school history.

== College career ==
Phillips played college basketball for the Kentucky Wildcats, for coach Joe B. Hall. He helped Kentucky win a national championship in 1978. He teamed with 6-foot-11-inch (2.11 m) Rick Robey, to form a duo known as the Twin Towers.

Phillips played four years for the Wildcats, earning All-SEC honors in his sophomore (second team), junior (second team) and senior years (third team). In his senior season, Phillips averaged more than 10 points per game on the Wildcats' 1978 national championship team. For his career, Phillips finished 25th on the school's career scoring list, with 1,367 points (11.4 per game), and he also grabbed 755 rebounds (6.3 per game).

== Professional career ==
Following graduation, Phillips was drafted by the New Jersey Nets, in the 1978 NBA draft, but he never played in the NBA. In 1979, he found his way to Spain, where he had a fruitful career. Phillips played six years in Spain's top-tier level league, the Liga ACB, and he won an ACB league championship in 1981, with FC Barcelona. For his ACB career, Phillips scored 4,423 points (23.2 per game) and grabbed 1,765 rebounds (9.2 per game) in his six seasons.

== Death ==
Phillips died after falling down a flight of stairs at his Madisonville, Kentucky, home, on April 25, 2015. The 59-year-old Phillips was home alone, and the Hopkins County coroner's investigation found no evidence of criminality in the event.
