= Mastruz com Leite =

- Origin: Fortaleza, Ceará, Brazil
- Genre: Electronic forró
- Years active: 1990–present
- Label: SomZoom
- Members: Mara Rodrigues; Gilly Araújo; Evelyn Silva; Nerivaldo Bezerra; Roberta Felina; Djailma Pontes; Lulu do Parambu; Bem-Te-Vi; Tiago Sena; Artur César; Jean Silva; Ricardo Barros; Wellington Mendes; Neném Esmério; Meire de Castro

Mastruz com Leite is a Brazilian electronic forró band, formed in 1990 by entrepreneur Emanuel Gurgel, in Fortaleza, Ceará. It is considered the first electronic forró band in the country, as it introduced instruments such as electronic keyboard, electric guitar, electric bass, and saxophone in addition to the traditional accordion, zabumba, and triangle, expanding the sonic possibilities of forró. It is also one of the biggest bands of the genre in the country, alongside Calcinha Preta.

== History ==
In November 1990, entrepreneur Emanuel Gurgel — who would later create the entertainment conglomerate Grupo SomZoom — envisioned a band that would play exclusively forró, when he noticed that dance halls became more crowded whenever bands included this rhythm in their repertoire. Mastruz com Leite's first show took place on December 22, 1990, at Mangueira Clube in Fortaleza.

In 1992, the band recorded their first album, Arrocha o Nó, which included forró adaptations of songs by artists well known to the Brazilian public, such as Amado Batista, Roberta Miranda, Leandro e Leonardo, and Elba Ramalho. The album became a commercial success, selling 400,000 copies. In 1993, the band released a new album, Só pra Xamegar, which became an even greater success, selling 750,000 copies. It featured the song "Meu Vaqueiro, Meu Peão," composed by Rita de Cássia and considered the band's most famous song.

== Discography ==
- Arrocha o Nó (1992)
- Só pra Xamegar (1993)
- Coisa Nossa (1993)
- Rock do Sertão (1994)
- Flor do Mamulengo (1994)
- O Boi Zebu e as Formigas (1995)
- Cabeça de Bob's x Barriga Crescida (1995)
- No Forró do Gonzagão (1996)
- Moto Táxi (1996)
- No Forró do Jackson do Pandeiro (1996)
- Em Todo Canto do Mundo Tem Cearense (1996)
- Mulher (1997)
- Solando pra Você Dançar e Cantar I (1997)
- Solando pra Você Dançar e Cantar II (1997)
- Tatuagem (1998)
- Solando pra Você Dançar e Cantar III (1998)
- Canta Trio Nordestino (1998)
- Grandes Solos (1998)
- Canta Dominguinhos (1999)
- Canta Sucessos do Rei (1999)
- São João na Roça (1999)
- Feira Dançante (1999)
- Grandes Solos II (1999)
- Solando pra Você Dançar e Cantar IV (2000)
- Canta Pinduca (2000)
- Acústico I (2000)
- Coração de Pedra (2001)
- Cantigas de Roda (2001)
- Canta Carlos Santos (2002)
- Acústico II (2002)
- Do Forró do Grilo a New York (2003)
- CD Oficial do São João (2005)
- Meu Alimento (2006)
- Arrocha o Nó II (2007)
- Em Todos os Sentidos (2009)
- Vaquejada e Forró (2011)
- Solando pra Você Dançar (2012)
- Na Contramão como Preferencial (2013)
- São João de Todos os Tempos (2018)
- Terapia - Forró sem Efeito Colateral (2019)
- Acústico Imaginar (2019)
- Audio Live "A Minha, A Sua, A Nossa História" (2020)
- Audio Live "Todos Cantam Mastruz" (2020)
- Acústico Deluxe - Tempo para Tudo (2021)
- Canta Rita de Cássia (2022)
- Rolê Junino (2022)
- Acústico Imaginar: Mastruz com Leite Pé de Serra (2002)
- Mastruz e Cavalo Acústico Imaginar (2023)
- São João no Forrobodó (2023)
- O Filé do São João (2025)
- Mastruz Canta Luiz Gonzaga (2025)
