= Frank Mason Raymond House =

Historic house in Ohio, United States

- U.S. National Register of Historic Places
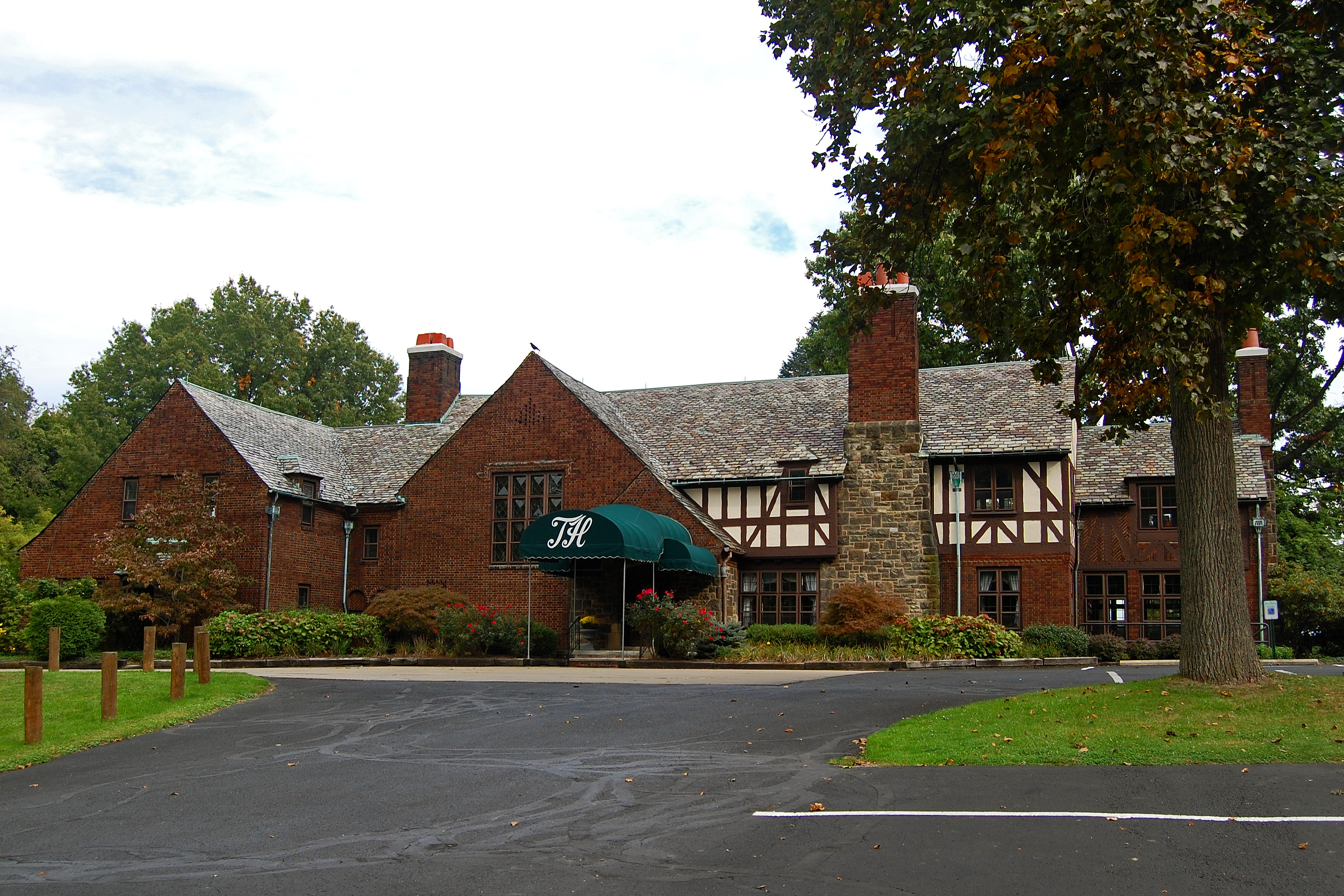

- Location within Ohio Location within the United States
- Location: 655 Latham Ln, New Franklin, Ohio
- Nearest city: Akron, Ohio
- Coordinates: 40°57′49″N 81°32′44″W
- Area: 16 acres (6.5 ha)
- Built: 1929
- Architect: Good & Wagner
- Architectural style: Tudor Revival
- NRHP reference No.: 95000500
- Added to NRHP: April 20, 1995

The Frank Mason Raymond House (Franklin Park Civic Center, locally known as the Tudor House) is a Tudor Revival house located in the Portage Lakes area of New Franklin, Ohio.

== History and architecture ==
The 20-room, 2½-story, brick and stucco mansion sits on 5.8 acres (2.3 ha), adjacent to Portage Lakes State Park, and has 335 feet (102 m) of frontage on the west shore of Turkeyfoot Lake.

The house was designed by Good & Wagner, an Akron architectural firm best known as the designers of the Akron YMCA Building. The Frank Mason Raymond House was constructed and given to Raymond and his wife, the former Zeletta Robinson, as a wedding present from his grandfather, Frank H. Mason, who was a senior executive of the B. F. Goodrich Company and had his large summer mansion adjacent to this house. The mansion, which once housed a nursing home, has since been torn down. The couple were married on December 28, 1927, and lived at Mason's neighboring mansion, Brighton Farms, for the 13 months while their home was being built. They continued to live at the Tudor House until they built a home in Bath Township.

Consisting of 1,700 acres (690 ha), Brighton Farms was one of the largest estates in the Lakes area. In 1954, 500 acres (200 ha) of the estate were sold to the State of Ohio for the Portage Lakes State Park.

The Tudor House was later rented by Goodrich Vice-president, George Vaught, and his family. Then, in 1943, prominent Akron jeweler Henry B. Ball and his wife, Helen, bought the mansion. They lived there for 25 years with their children, Skip and Betty (Mrs. Dick Walter). Betty was married at the mansion. From 1968 to 1974, Akron contractor Robert Fabbro and his family of six children occupied the mansion. In 1974, it was sold to the Ohio Department of Natural Resources. In July 1977, a 50-year lease was signed with the State for the facilities to be used as a civic center. Under the direction of the Franklin Park Civic Center Commission, it is the site of numerous community activities.

It is a distinctive example of the Tudor Revival style of architecture, with its arched doorways, carved wood staircase, prominent Tudor arch fireplace with oak paneling, and exposed beams in the living room. The exterior also reflects Tudor design in its gabled front entry with stone trim, massive stone and brick chimneys, slate roof with prominent cross gables, and copper gutters. The gardens include an embanked grotto, constructed of stone.
