= Čao Laru =

French-Brazilian musical group

- Origin: Rennes, Brittanny, France; Brazil
- Genres: World music, folk music (see "Musical style" section for details)
- Years active: 2015–present
- Labels: Pequeno Imprevisto
- Members: Noubar Sarkissian Junior; Léa Catarina Duez; Nicolle Bello; Joel Rocha; Pedro Destro; Manuel Tirso
- Past members: Fábio de Pádua; Ana Brandão; Marie Tisser; Victor Ledoux; Louise Aleci; Cecilia Iovino; Laura Aubry; Yann Le Traon; Pedro Correa Abrantes Pinheiro; Felipe Trez

Čao Laru ([tkau laɾɾu]) is a French-Brazilian band formed in 2015 in Rennes, France. They mix up elements of many musical styles and are considered a "traveling" or "nomad" group, since they are constantly traveling in their Kombi in order to tour.

== History ==
Members Noubar Sarkissian Junior (born to an Egyptian father and a Brazilian mother), Laura Aubry, Marie Tissier, Louise Aleci and Victor Ledoux met in 2015 in Rennes, France, where they were mastering at Musical Pedagogy. They decided to create a group of "musical interventionists" who would play in retirement homes, daycares and hospitals.

According to them, "čao laru" is a term mixing Serbian and French which they use to greet and say goodbye. It is also "an exclamation, an invitation to sharing and rapture". Specifically, "čao" is an expression common in East Europe while "laru" comes from "la rue", which means "the street" in French. Therefore, the group's name could mean "hi, street!" or "bye, street!".

In 2016, they toured outside of France for the first time, in Cuba. Then, in June, they did a bigger tour, visiting 13 countries in Europe with a rented motorhome. In October, they came to Brazil and bought a Kombi, with which they toured from Bahia state to Patagonia. The van broke down in Esquel and since there were no parts available to fix it, they had to resume touring by asking for rides. Still in 2016, they released a self-titled EP.

In 2018, they released the album Kombiphonie. In the following year, on 1 February, they released the album Fronteiras in digital and vinyl formats and featuring, among others, Juliana Strassacapa, Francisco, el Hombre vocalist; and Luiz Gabriel Lopes, Rosa Neon vocalist.

By the end of 2019, they released the single and video "Quero Falar", which questions the way humankind handles its waste.

In May 2020, they released their third album, Libre (via new label Pequeno Imprevisto), preceded by four singles, among them "Soleil Grand Matin", written in Creole, and "Não Estaremos Sós", which received a video recorded in collaboration with fans. The effort was made possible after a crowdfunding campaign with part of the raised funds going to social projects. The album, expected for August, was released in May in order to expedite the donations.

== Musical style ==
The group mixes elements of French, Macedonian, Brazilian, Indian, Occitanian and Balkan music, among others, including maracatu, samba, chacarera, afoxé, baião, French waltz, hip hop and milonga.

The band defines itself as a world music group, but they have been seeing them as world music as in "music for the world". In total, they work with 26 instruments.

== Members ==
=== Current line-up ===
Per two sources published on the first week of March 2020 and an undated source informing Fábio Pádua's departure in April of the same year.

- Noubar Sarkissian Junior — vocals, cavaquinho, pandeiro, accordion, acoustic guitar
- Léa Catarina Duez — vocals, flutes, saxophone, percussion
- Nicolle Bello — vocals, dance, percussion
- Joel Rocha — rabeca, guitar, flutes, acoustic guitar
- Pedro Destro — bass, double bass
- Manuel Tirso — drums

=== Former members ===
The former members below are mentioned in several sources. Besides, in May 2020, they said they have already switched bassists seven times, with Brazilian, French, Mexican and Argentinian people having played the instrument; they once explained they change bassists and drummers constantly in order to adapt to the rhythms of the places they go to. They have already had members from France, Brazil, Argentina, Italy and Mexico.

- Fábio de Pádua — flute, clarinet, violin, mandolin, triangle
- Ana Brandão — dance
- Marie Tisser — vocals, cello
- Victor Ledoux — vocals, saxophone
- Louise Aleci — vocals, violin
- Cecilia Iovino — vocals, tap dance, dance
- Laura Aubry — vocals, accordion
- Yann Le Traon — double bass
- Pedro Correa Abrantes Pinheiro — bass, double bass
- Felipe Trez — drums

== Discography ==
=== EPs ===
- Čao Laru (2016)

=== Albums ===
- Kombiphonie (2018)
- Fronteiras (2019)
- Libre (2020)

=== Singles ===
- "Quero Falar" (2019)
- "Não Estaremos Sós" (2020)
- "La Ruta Natural" (2020)
- "Soleil Grand Matin" (2020)
