= Luiz Gonzaga =

Brazilian recording artist, songwriter, singer (1912-1989)

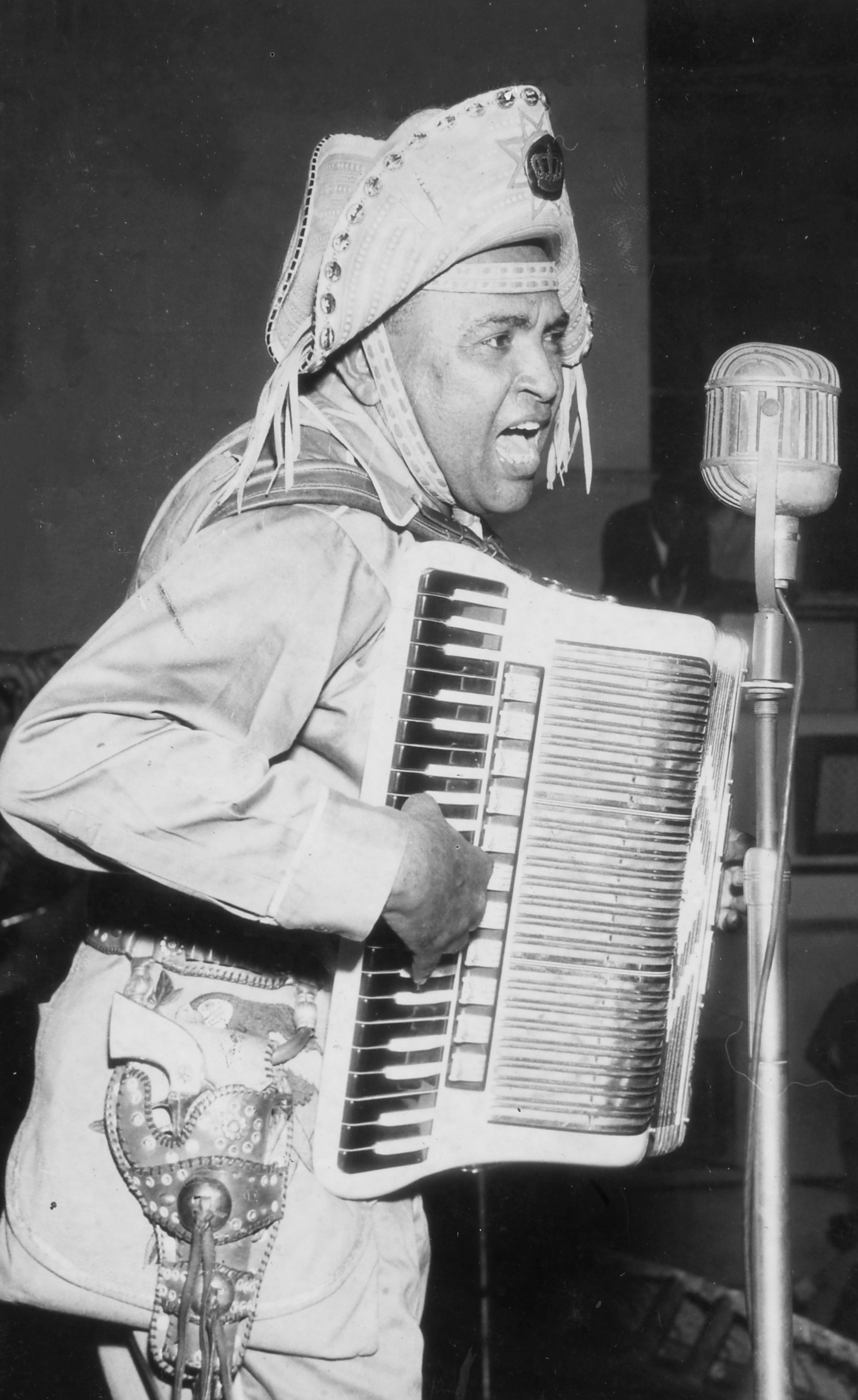
- Gonzaga in 1957

Background information
- Born: Luiz Gonzaga do Nascimento; December 13, 1912; Exu, Pernambuco, Brazil
- Died: August 2, 1989 (aged 76) Recife, Pernambuco, Brazil
- Genres: Baião; forró; xaxado; arrasta-pé; quadrilha
- Occupations: Singer-songwriter; musician
- Instruments: Vocals; accordion; triangle; zabumba
- Years active: 1940–1989
- Labels: RCA, EMI-Odeon, Discos Copacabana
- Website: http://www.gonzagao.com.br/

Luiz Gonzaga do Nascimento (standard orthography 'Luís'; Portuguese pronunciation: [luˈiz ɡõˈzaɡɐ]; December 13, 1912 – August 2, 1989) was a Brazilian singer, songwriter, musician and poet and one of the most influential figures of Brazilian popular music in the twentieth century. He has been credited with having presented the rich universe of Northeastern musical genres to all of Brazil, having popularized the musical genre baião and has been called a "revolutionary" by Antônio Carlos Jobim. According to Caetano Veloso, he was the first significant cultural event with mass appeal in Brazil. Luiz Gonzaga received the Shell prize for Brazilian Popular Music in 1984 and was only the fourth artist to receive this prize after Pixinguinha, Antônio Carlos Jobim and Dorival Caymmi. The Luiz Gonzaga Dam was named in his honor.

Gonzaga's son, Luiz Gonzaga do Nascimento Jr, known as Gonzaguinha (1945–1991), was also a noted Brazilian singer and composer.

== Biography ==
Son of Januário José dos Santos (1888–1978), a farmer and accordion player, and Anna Batista de Jesus (1893–1960), a housewife, Gonzaga was attracted to the accordion at a very early age, and he used to accompany his father at parties and religious celebrations. He later went to do his military service, where he learned to play the cornet. On leaving the army he decided to remain in Rio de Janeiro, performing in the streets and in bars.

After noticing that the north-eastern people living in Rio de Janeiro missed the music from their home states, he started to integrate traditional (forró) music rhythms and instruments in his work. At Ary Barroso's talent show, Luiz Gonzaga played the Xamego "Vira e Mexe" and was acclaimed by the audience and by the host, who gave him the highest score. After discovering this niche in the market, Gonzaga became a regular at radio shows and started making records.

In 1943, he dressed up in typical north-eastern costumes for the first time to perform live, and got hyped. Later on, as well as playing popular tunes on the accordion, he began to sing his own material, and his skills as a songwriter were revealed. His greatest hit ever, "Asa Branca" (written with Humberto Teixeira), was recorded in 1947 and covered countless times by many artists. He worked on the radio until 1954, enjoying huge popularity. He became (in the words of Caetano Veloso, Caderno de Confessões Brasileiras, 1988) a "pop music" star, taking a genre straight from folklore to the pop music, creating with the combination of accordion, zabumba, and triangle (which became later the basic ensemble for Forró) one of the western world's first "small pop music ensembles", ten years before the popularization of the rock music ensemble by the Beatles.

He is widely recognized for single-handedly taking the baião style and the accordion to a wide audience. RCA (now BMG), his recording label, was almost exclusively dedicated to printing his singles and albums. During the 1960s, as the public taste shifted to bossa nova and iê-iê-iê, he found himself increasingly stranded from big city stages, so he toured the countryside, where his popularity never abated.

In the 1970s and 1980s, he slowly re-emerged, partly due to covers of his songs by famous artists like Geraldo Vandré, Caetano Veloso, Gilberto Gil, his son Gonzaguinha and Milton Nascimento. Some of his greatest hits are "Vozes da Seca" ("Voices From Drought"), "Algodão" ("Cotton"), "A Dança da Moda" ("The Dance in Fashion"), "ABC do Sertão" ("The ABC of Sertão"), "Derramaro o Gai" ("They Spilt the Gas"), "A Letra I" ("The 'i' letter"), "Imbalança" ("Shake It"), "A Volta da Asa-Branca" ("The Return of The Picazuro Pigeon"), "Cintura Fina" ("Slender Waist"), "O Xote das Meninas" ("The Girls' Schottische", written with Zé Dantas, and "Juazeiro", "Paraíba", "Mangaratiba", "Baião-de-Dois", "No Meu Pé de Serra" ("There in My Homeland"), "Assum Preto" ("Blue-back Grassquit"), "Légua Tirana" ("Tyrannical league"), "Qui Nem Jiló" ("Like Solanum gilo", written with Humberto Teixeira. Other successful collaborations resulted in "Tá Bom Demais" ("It's So Good") (with Onildo de Almeida), "Danado de Bom" ("Damn Good") (with João Silva), "Dezessete e Setecentos" ("Seventeen And Seven hundred") and "Cortando o Pano" ("Cutting Cloth") (both with Miguel Lima). Gonzaga died of natural causes around 8:00 BRT on August 2, 1989, at the age of 76.

== Discography ==
Albums

- A História Do Nordeste Na Voz De Luiz Gonzaga (1955)
- Aboios E Vaquejadas (1956)
- O Reino Do Baião (1957)
- São João Na Roça (1958)
- Xamego (1958)
- Luiz Gonzaga Canta Seus Sucessos Com Zé Dantas (1959)
- Luiz "Lua" Gonzaga (1961)
- São João Na Roça (1962)
- Ô Véio Macho (1962)
- Pisa No Pilão (Festa Do Milho) (1963)
- A Triste Partida (1964)
- Sanfona Do Povo (1964)
- Quadrilhas E Marchinhas Juninas (1965)
- Óia Eu Aqui De Novo (1967)
- O Sanfoneiro Do Povo De Deus (1967)
- São João Do Araripe (1968)
- Canaã (1969)
- Sertão 70 (1970)
- São João Quente (1971)
- O Canto Jovem De Luiz Gonzaga (1971)
- Aquilo Bom! (1972)
- São Paulo – QG Do Baião (1974)
- Daquele Jeito (1974)
- Capim Novo (1976)
- Gravado Ao Vivo - Espetáculo Das Seis E Meia - Teatro João Caetano - Rio (with Carmélia Alves) (1977)
- Cha Cutuba (1977)
- Dengo Maior (1978)
- Eu E Meu Pai (1979)
- Quadrilhas E Marchinhas Vol. 2 (1979)
- O Homem Da Terra (1980)
- A Nova Jerusalém (1980)
- A Festa (1981)
- A Vida Do Viajante (with Gonzaguinha) (1981)
- O Rei Volta Pra Casa (1982)
- Eterno Cantador (1982)
- 70 Anos De Sanfona E Simpatia (1983)
- Luiz Gonzaga & Fagner (with Raimundo Fagner) (1984)
- Danado De Bom (1984)
- Prêmio Shell Para a Música Brasileira (with Mozart Camargo Guarnieri) (1984)
- Sanfoneiro Macho (1985)
- 45 Anos De Sucessos (1985)
- Forró De Cabo A Rabo (1986)
- De Fiá Pavi (1987)
- Gonzagão & Fagner 2 (with Raimundo Fagner) (1988)
- Aí Tem Gonzagão (1988)
- Asa Branca (1988)
- Luiz Gonzaga E Sua Sanfona Vol. 2 (1989)
- Aquarela Nordestina (1989)
- Copacabana (1989)
- Vou Te Matar De Cheiro (1989)
- Forrobodó Cigano (1989)
- Missa Do Vaqueiro (1989)
- Forró Do Comeco Ao Fim (1991)
- Forró do Gonzagão - Do Jeito Que O Povo Gosta (1993)
- Ao Vivo - Volta Pra Curtir (2001)
- Danado De Bom (2003)
- Sua Melhor Época (2010)
- A Raiz Do Nordeste (2011)
- Baião Dos Hippies (2021)

Singles

- "Vira-e-mexe" / "Qui Nem Giló" (1941)
- "Saudades De Ouro Preto" / "Pé de serra" (1942)
- "Subindo Ao Céu" / "Fuga Da África" (1944)
- "Caxangá" / "Cortando Pano" (1945)
- "Penerô Xerém" / "Sanfona Dourada" (1945)
- "Isto É Que Nós Queremos" / "Perpétua" (1946)
- "Não Bate Nêle" / "Calango Da Lacraia" (1946)
- "Festa Napolitana" / "Ovo Azul" (1946)
- "Pão Duro" / "Sabido" (1946)
- "Vou Prá Roça" / "Asa Branca" (1947)
- "No Meu Pé De Serra" / "Pagode Russo" (1947)
- "Moda Da Mula Preta" / "Firim, Firim, Firim" (1948)
- "Siridó" / "Legua Tirana" (1949)
- "Lorota Bôa" / "Mangaratiba" (1949)
- "A Dança Da Moda" / "Respeita Januário" (1950)
- "Sabia" / "Boiadeiro" (1950)
- "Chofér De Praça" / "No Ceará Não Tem Disso Não" (1950)
- "Assun Preto" / "Cintura Fina" (1950)
- "17 Légua E Meia" / "Forró De Mané Vito" (1950)
- "Chofér De Praça" / "No Ceará Não Tem Disso Não" (1950)
- "Vem Morena" / "Quase Maluco" (1950)
- "A Dança Da Moda" / "Respeita Januário" (1950)
- "Vem Morena" / "Quase Maluco" (1950)
- "Cintura" / "Xanduzinha" (1950)
- "Mariá" / "Amanhã Eu Vou" (1951)
- "Sabiá" / "Baião Da Penha" (1951)
- "Cigarro De Paia" / "Baião Na Garoa" (1951)
- "Propriá" / "Olha Pro Céu" (1951)
- "Pra Não Dizer Que Não Falei Das Flores" / "Beata Mocinha" (1952)
- "Paraxaxá" / "A Vida Do Viajante" (1953)
- "O xote das meninas" / "13 De Dezembro" (1953)
