= Manchester Local School District =

Manchester Local School District may refer to:

- Manchester Local School District (Adams County), Adams County, Ohio
- Manchester Local School District (Summit County), Ohio
