= Bill Allen (rockabilly musician) =

American rockabilly musician (1937–2013)

- Born: Wilfred Allen Snivley; June 5, 1937; Portage Lakes, Ohio, United States
- Died: February 22, 2013 (aged 75) Akron, Ohio, U.S.
- Genres: Rockabilly, rock and roll
- Instruments: Vocals, rhythm guitar
- Years active: 1956–1959
- Labels: Imperial Records, Eldorado Records

Bill Allen (June 5, 1937 – February 22, 2013) was an American rockabilly singer-songwriter and lead vocalist of The Back Beats, which he founded with John Seli, with whom he recorded the 1958 single, "Please Give Me Something." Various music commentators have noted Allen's raw, energetic musical qualities. Music writer Koh-1 compared the song's "hiccup-style vocals and echo-drenched guitar" with "garage rock and punk as well," while Steve Kelemen of the Rockabilly Hall of Fame called it "one of the wildest rockabilly recordings ever made." Additionally, the Rubber City Review described it as "one of the best examples" of raw, high-energy rock and roll, leading to its being covered by various artists in psychobilly and punk-influenced styles. The Rubber City Review also described the song as "one of the best examples of the form" and as an influence on The Cramps, whose frontman, Lux Interior, was also from Akron.

== Biography ==
Wilfred Allen Snivley was born on June 5, 1937, in Portage Lakes, Ohio, near Akron, where he attended Ellet High School and played locally with Johnny Seli in a band The Keynotes.

=== Eldorado Records ===
The Keynotes were a house band, and were seen by Bill Buchanan and Dickie Goodman of Eldorado Records (an independent record label in New York arranged an audition for Bill Allen and the Keynotes to record the A-side and B-side "Butterfly" / "Oo-Wee Baby," the latter of which was an original song. Eldorado issued and released the single as catalog number Eldorado 505 and it quickly achieved regional airplay across Ohio, Pennsylvania, and Indiana, leading to the Keynotes touring alongside Carl Perkins and Roy Orbison in 1957. The single gained enough commercial momentum to be listed on The Billboard Honor Roll of Hits in April 1957.

However, Andy Williams's recording of "Butterfly" on Cadence Records surged to number one nationally, overshadowing Allen's version, and Eldorado's distribution network had collapsed by 1961.

=== Please Give Me Something (1958, Imperial Records) by The Back Beats ===
After the Keynotes disbanded, Allen formed a new group with Seli and drummer Dean Hanley, recording as Bill Allen and the Back Beats. They cut two sides at an advertising studio at Akron radio station WCUE using minimal equipment: Seli played a Gibson Les Paul through a Fender Bassman, Allen handled rhythm guitar through a Fender reverb unit, while Hanley improvised percussion using a muted snare, a desktop, and a telephone book.

"Since I Have You" was written by Lou Stallman, and the B-side, "Please Give Me Something," was cowritten by Allen and Seli during the same session. The recording was sent to Imperial Records in Los Angeles, where label owner Lew Chudd approved its release as Imperial X5500 and promoted it as a top pick.

Allen continued performing for decades in the Akron area and as a solo entertainer in resort venues and beach bars, particularly in St. Pete Beach, Florida. He later returned to Ohio, where he died on February 22, 2013.

== Legacy ==
"Please Give Me Something" has been widely covered. The Stray Cats adapted it as "Crawl Up and Die" on their 1981 debut album, produced by Dave Edmunds. Psychobilly band Guana Batz recorded a version for their 1985 debut Held Down to Vinyl... At Last!. Other artists who have covered the song include The Bopcats, The Zantees, Jimmie Lee Maslon and the Crazy Sounds, and Demolition Doll Rods.

In February 2016, Robert Plant performed the song with guitarist Darrel Higham on the Sky 1 series Stella, and a studio version featuring Jools Holland appeared on Higham's 2017 album Hell's Hotel.

== Discography ==
Year of recording	Label and catalog number	A-side and B-side
1957	Eldorado Records, Eldorado 505	"Butterfly" b/w "Oo-Wee Baby" by Bill Allen and the Keynotes
1958	Imperial Records	"Since I Have You" b/w "Please Give Me Something" Bill Allen and the Back Beats Compilations containing "Please Give Me Something" have been issued on Bear Family Records and by The Cramps
