= Manchester High School (New Franklin, Ohio) =

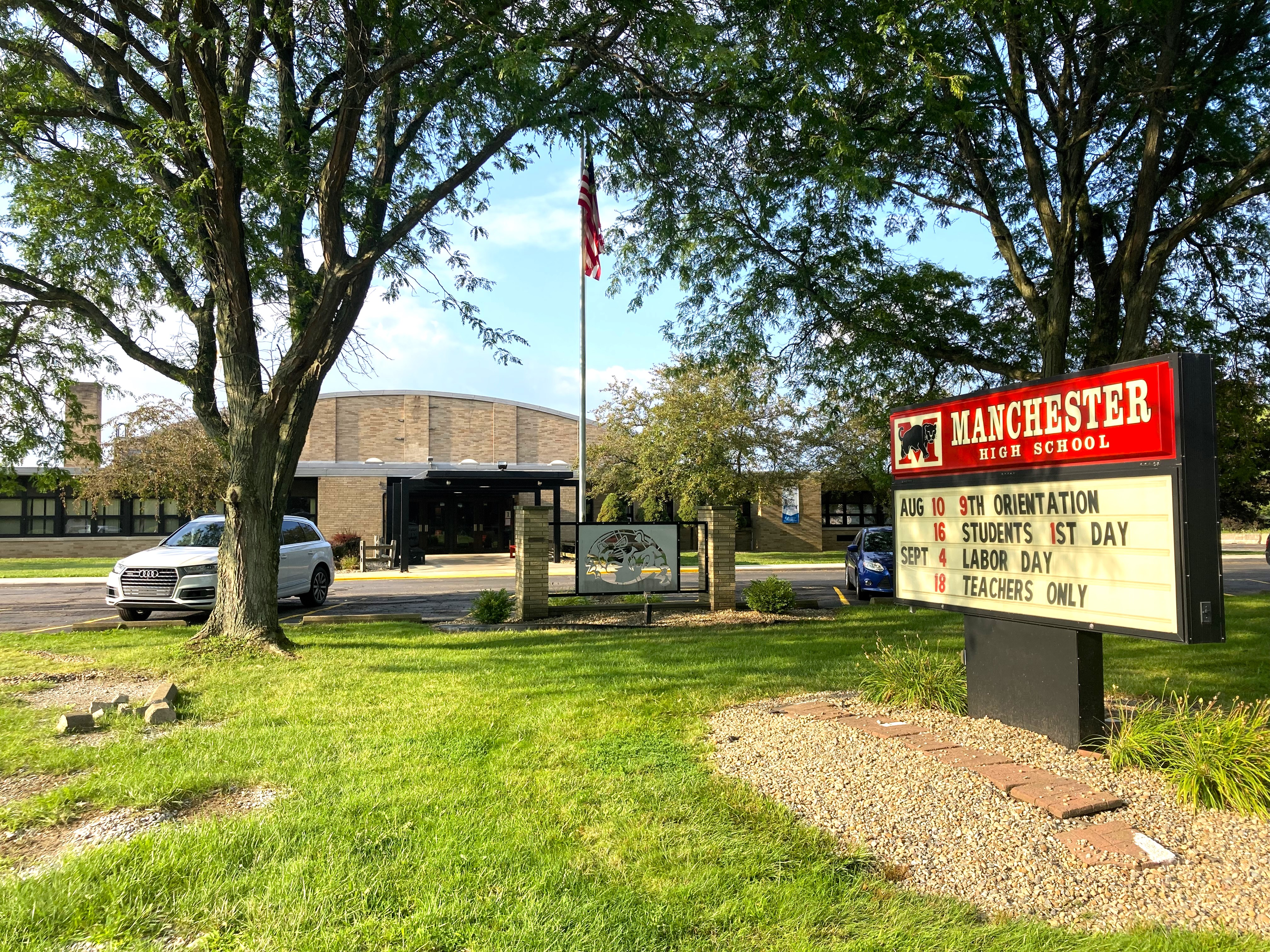

Location
- 437 West Nimisila Road; New Franklin, Ohio 44319; United States; 40°56′28″N 81°33′02″W

Information
- Type: Public
- Locale: Suburban, Large (21)
- NCES District ID: OH-050005
- CEEB code: 360065
- NCES School ID: OH-050005-022418
- Principal: Derrick Mauger
- Grades: 9-12
- Enrollment: 394 (2023-2024) (2024-25)
- Student to teacher ratio: 14.07
- Language: English
- Campus type: Suburban
- Colors: Black and red
- Athletics: Boys Basketball, Girls Softball
- Mascot: Panther
- Team name: Panthers
- Affiliations: Manchester Local School District
- Website: mhs.panthercountry.org
- Last updated: 28 March 2026

Manchester High School is a public high school located in New Franklin, Ohio about 12 miles south of Akron. It is part of the Manchester Local School District in the southwestern corner of Summit County. The mascot is the black panther, and the school colors are red and black. As of the 2025-26 school year, the principal of the school is Derrick Mauger. The school competes in the Principals Athletic Conference (Pac-7).

== Education ==
As of the 2024–25 school year, the school serves approximately 394 students in grades 9–12.

== Athletics ==
=== Football ===
The Panthers football program has a history of competitive teams. The team was coached by former National Football League player Les Olsson for 25 seasons, who won 131 games with the Panthers. Olsson was succeeded by Jim France, who coached for 48 seasons, from 1971 through the 2019 season. Under France, who set the Ohio state record for coaching victories with 398, the Panthers won 23 conference titles and had a state runner-up finish in 1997. Former NFL player Jay Brophy coached the team from 2020 through the 2022 season.

=== State championships ===
- Boys basketball - 1974
- Girls softball – 1979, 1990, 2001
