= Coventry Township, Ohio =

Township in Ohio, US

- Township
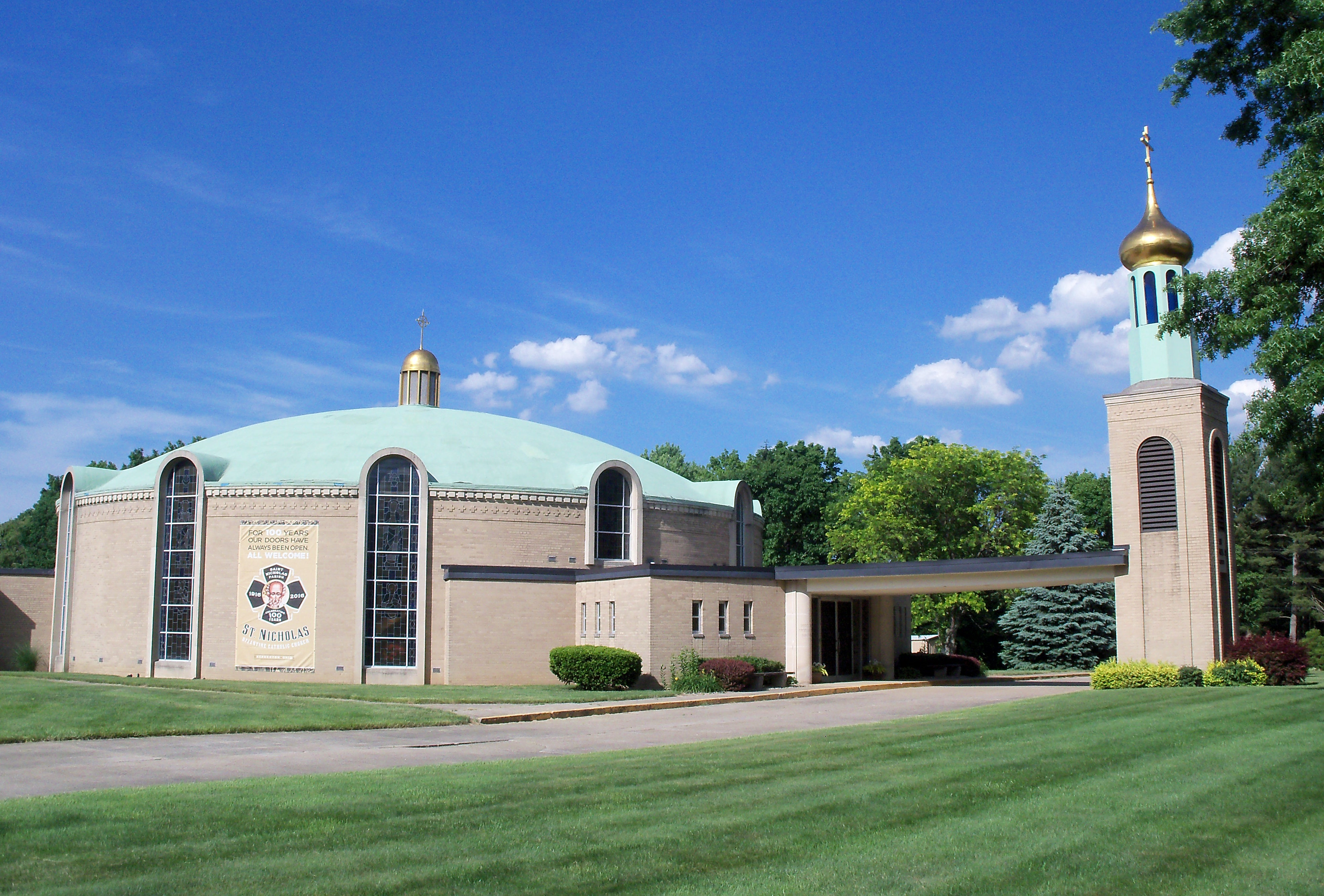
- Saint Nicholas Byzantine Catholic Church on Robinson Avenue

- Location in Summit County and the state of Ohio.
- Coordinates: 41°0′16″N 81°31′46″W
- Country: United States
- State: Ohio
- County: Summit

Area
  - Total: 9.2 sq mi (23.8 km^{2})
  - Land: 8.2 sq mi (21.2 km^{2})
  - Water: 1.0 sq mi (2.6 km^{2})
- Elevation: 965 ft (294 m)

Population (2020)
  - Total: 10,238
  - Density: 1,245/sq mi (480.7/km^{2})
- Time zone: UTC-5 (Eastern (EST))
  - Summer (DST): UTC-4 (EDT)
- Postal Code: 44319
- Area code: 330/234
- FIPS code: 39-19036
- GNIS feature ID: 1087000
- Website: coventrytownship.com

Coventry Township is one of the nine townships of Summit County, Ohio, United States. The 2020 census found 10,238 people in the township.

== Geography ==
Coventry Township is located in southern Summit County. At its creation, it bordered the following townships:

- Portage Township - north
- Springfield Township - east
- Green Township - southeast
- Franklin Township - southwest
- Norton Township - west

However, due to annexations, it currently borders the following township and cities:

- Akron - north
- Springfield Township - east
- Green - southeast
- New Franklin - southwest
- Barberton - west

Several populated places are located in the original bounds of Coventry Township:

- Part of the city of Akron, the county seat of Summit County, in the north
- Part of the city of Barberton, in the west
- The census-designated place of Portage Lakes, in the center

== Name and history ==
It is the only Coventry Township statewide.

Coventry Township is part of the Connecticut Western Reserve in Township 1N, Range 11W.

== Government ==
The township is governed by a three-member board of trustees, who are elected in November of odd-numbered years to a four-year term beginning on the following January 1. Two are elected in the year after the presidential election and one is elected in the year before it. There is also an elected township fiscal officer, who serves a four-year term beginning on April 1 of the year after the election, which is held in November of the year before the presidential election. Vacancies in the fiscal officership or on the board of trustees are filled by the remaining trustees.
