= Brazil: Forró - Music for Maids and Taxi Drivers =

Brazil: Forró – Music for Maids and Taxi Drivers

Compilation album by Various Artists
- Released: 1989
- Genre: Forró
- Length: 48:00
- Label: Rounder Records
- Producer: Zé da Flauta (original tracks); Gerald Seligman (compilation)

Professional ratings
Review scores
Source	Rating
AllMusic	4.5/5 stars

Brazil: Forró – Music for Maids and Taxi Drivers is a various artists genre compilation album that was dedicated to Forró, a music style from Brazil. Released in 1989, the album was nominated for the Best Traditional Folk Album in the 33rd Annual Grammy Awards two years later.

According to US producer Gerald Seligman, the original tracks were produced by Zé da Flauta, who came to prominence in the group Quinteto Violado, founded in Recife in 1970 and most active throughout that decade. Zé sold the forró master tapes and all rights to Rio de Janeiro-based Carlão de Andrade of Visom Records, who pressed them intending for the sales to help fund the start-up of his label of instrumental music. There they languished until Seligman spied them in a Visom closet in 1987. He took them back to NY, recognized their value as a rare example of roots forró music and approached both GlobeStyle Records in the UK and Rounder in the US to gauge interest in a compilation. Both signed on. Seligman also commissioned acclaimed woodblock artist Marcelo Soares to create the cover in the style of Literatura de Cordel, which are popular rhyming broadsides distributed throughout the Brazilian Northeast.

== Track listing ==
#	Artist	Track title	Length
1	Toinho de Alagoas	Balanço da Canoa (Rock The Boat)	2:13
2	Duda da Passira	De Pernambuco ao Maranhão (From Pernambuco To Maranhão)	2:13
3	José Orlando	Eu Também Quero Beijar (I Want To Kiss, Too)	2:55
4	Toinho de Alagoas	Bicho da Cara Preta (Black-Faced Ghoul - A Folkloric Figure)	1:53
5	Heleno dos Oito Baixos	Começo De Verâo (Start Of Summer)	2:53
6	Toinho de Alagoas	Peça Licença Pra Falar de Alagoas (Ask If You Can Speak Of Alagoas)	1:49
7	Duda da Passira	Recordação Da Passira (Remembering Passira)	2:36
8	José Orlando	Agricultor Pra Frente (Modern Agriculture)	1:57
9	Heleno dos Oito Baixos	Entra e Sai (In And Out)	2:09
10	José Orlando	Linda Menina (Pretty Girl)	3:00
11	Duda da Passira	Casa de Tauba (Wooden House)	1:44
12	José Orlando	Morena da Palmeira (The Brunette Of Palmeira)	2:39
13	Toinho de Alagoas	Caráter Duro (Hard Character)	1:31
14	José Orlando	Minha Zezé (My Zezé)	2:07
15	Toinho de Alagoas	Sonho de Amor (Dream Of Love)	1:44
16	Toinho de Alagoas	Namoro no Escuro (Dating In The Dark)	1:52
17	Duda da Passira	Forró de Minha Terra (Forró Of My Land)	1:45

== Awards and nominations ==
Year	Award	Category	Result	Ref.
1991	33rd Annual Grammy Awards	Best Traditional Folk Album	Nominated	
