= Calcinha Preta =

Brazilian band

- Origin: Aracaju, Sergipe, Brazil
- Genre: Electronic forró
- Years active: 1995–present
- Label: MD Music · FazMídia
- Members: Daniel Diau; Bell Oliver; Marlus Viana; O'Hara Ravick; Mika Rodrigues

Calcinha Preta (lit. 'Black Panties') is a Brazilian electronic forró band. Founded in 1995 in Aracaju, Sergipe, by music producer Gilton Andrade, it became known for introducing pop and rock elements to forró, its highly theatrical performance style, and its Brazilian versions of international songs. Dois Amores, Duas Paixões (2006) is its best-selling studio album, with 1.5 million copies sold, and Mágica: Show Histórico (2005) is its best-selling live album, with 1.6 million copies sold.

== History ==
Calcinha Preta's history begins in 1993, when a dance band called "Santa Rosa" was founded, led by Ulisses Andrade. The name "Calcinha Preta" was chosen through a survey of several name options, and the band's first album was recorded in 1996, with vocalists Sidney "Chuchu" and Luciana Linhares. In 1997, the group released its second album in collaboration with Forrozão da Condenada, which included the song "Onde o Sonho Mora," the band's first hit and the one that made it known throughout the Northeast. That same year, Luciana left the group and Alexandre Melo, Malba Martins, and Jennifer Martins joined, a formation that recorded the third album, Arrepiando Com a Galera - Ao Vivo, which sold over 250,000 copies and earned the band its first Gold Record. In 1998, after a brief period with Márcia Glover, Daniel Diau joined the group, and the fourth album brought the band recognition across Brazil. In 1999, the band began appearing on national television programs and, with the arrival of Paulinha Abelha, released its fifth album. In 2000, the sixth album, Sou Seu Amor, marked the arrival of Raied Neto and Silvânia Aquino and included songs such as "Cobertor." At the end of that year, Daniel left the band and Berg Lima took his place.

Between 2001 and 2007, the band released a series of albums and DVDs with significant sales figures. In 2001, with Daniel's return and the arrival of Berg Rabelo, it recorded its seventh album. After Daniel's departure once again, Berg Rabelo assumed the male lead vocals, and the album Ao Vivo, vol. 8 (2002) became a sales record. In 2003, the band recorded its first DVD in Salvador and released "A Gente Se Vê Lá." In 2004, Berg Rabelo left the group and Marlus Viana joined, recording the album Mágica. In 2005, the second DVD, recorded in Belém, sold approximately 1.6 million copies. In 2006, the band released Dois Amores, Duas Paixões, its best-selling album. In 2007, the "Calcinha Elétrica" project was launched and the third DVD was recorded in Recife. From 2008 onward, following Daniel Diau's departure, the band went through numerous lineup changes. In 2009, the song "Você Não Vale Nada" was included in the soundtrack of the telenovela Caminho das Índias. In 2010, the band recorded its fourth DVD in Maceió, and in the following years it continued to undergo further changes in its vocalist lineup, including the returns of Marlus, Paulinha, and Bell.

In 2016, the song "A Dona do Barraco" was included in the soundtrack of a telenovela, and Silvânia and Paulinha left the band, while Ana Gouveia returned. In 2018, Daniel Diau, Silvânia, and Paulinha rejoined the group. In 2020, the band recorded its fifth DVD in Aracaju. In 2022, singer Paulinha Abelha died, and the band added a bee to its logo along with the subtitle "Como Não Amar," as well as releasing posthumous songs and holding a tribute show. In 2023, O'hara Ravick joined the lineup, and the band launched the "Atemporal" trilogy, with recordings in Salvador, Maceió, and São Paulo. In November 2025, Silvânia Aquino announced her departure, and shortly thereafter the band introduced new singer Mika Rodrigues and confirmed Marlus Viana's return to the vocals.

== Discography ==
=== Studio albums ===
- 1996: A Banda de Forró Mais Gostosa do Brasil
- 1997: Forrozão da Condenada & Banda Calcinha Preta
- 1998: A Moçada é Só Filé!
- 2000: Sou Seu Amor
- 2001: Seu Coração Vai Aprender o Que é Paixão!
- 2002: Amor da Minha Vida
- 2003: A Gente Se Vê Lá
- 2004: Hoje à Noite
- 2004: Mágica
- 2006: Dois Amores, Duas Paixões
- 2006: Pensão Alimentícia
- 2007: Como Vou Deixar Você?
- 2007: Fica Comigo, Paulinha!
- 2008: Vencedor, Nós Estamos Com Você!
- 2010: Sou Assim, Não Vou Mudar
- 2011: Meu Primeiro Namorado
- 2012: Eu Amo Você
- 2013: Vol. 27 Premium: Bem-Vindo à Nossa História
- 2014: Filmes e Histórias
- 2015: Balada Prime
- 2018: Edição Especial (Acústico)

=== Live albums ===
- 1997: Arrepiando Com a Galera! - Ao Vivo
- 1999: A Moçada é Só Filé! - Ao Vivo
- 2002: Ao Vivo, vol. 8
- 2003: Ao Vivo em Salvador
- 2005: Mágica: Show Histórico
- 2008: Ao Vivo no Recife
- 2009: Você Não Vale Nada, vol. 20 - Ao Vivo
- 2009: Eu Amo Demais - Ao Vivo e Na Boca do Povo
- 2010: Virei Seu Fã - Ao Vivo na Bahia
- 2011: Calcinha Preta 360º
- 2020: CP 25 Anos
- 2023: Volume 30
- 2024: Atemporal - Ao Vivo em Salvador
- 2025: Atemporal 360
- 2025: Atemporal - Ao Vivo em São Paulo
- 2026: Mágica: O Espetáculo
