= Escala nordestina =

Body of Brazilian musical scales

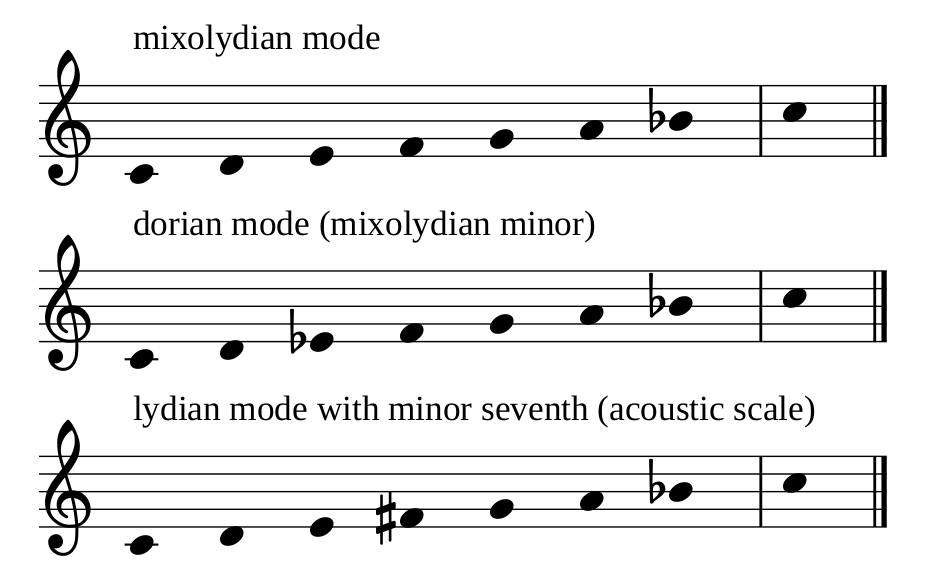
Three escalas nordestinas on C.,, or

The escala nordestina (Portuguese: "Northeastern scale") are a body of musical scales commonly used in the music of the Nordeste, the northeastern region of Brazil. The term can apply to several different scales, including the Mixolydian, the Lydian with a flattened seventh (see Acoustic scale), and the Dorian. These three modes have in common the rejection of the use of the major seventh as the leading-tone, generally preferring the more "acoustic and natural" minor seventh. The term northeastern scale is most commonly used to refer to the Mixolydian mode, which is extensively used in baião and frevo music. In Brazilian music, the Dorian mode is formed from the Mixolydian mode, by the lowering of the third, thus being a minor version of the former. The Brazilian Lydian, somewhat less common in practice, is a synthetic scale closely related to the harmonic series.
