= Xaxado =

Popular dance in Brazil

Xaxado dancers at the Festival de Folclore de Olímpia-SP (2018)

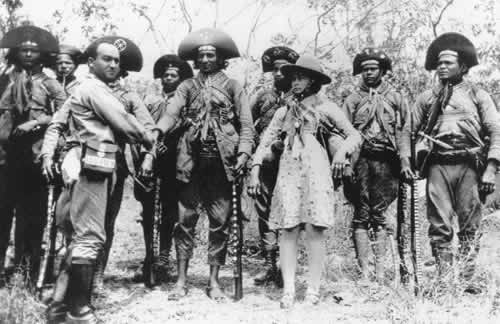
Portrait of cangaço bandits in the mid-1930s

The xaxado (Portuguese pronunciation: [ʃaˈʃadu]) is a popular dance created in the Sertão of Pernambuco state, Brazil.

The dance is performed in a circle or in a file. Its choreography is characterized by lateral movements of the right foot followed by a dragging of the left foot, creating a rhythmic, sliding motion, often accompanied by the sound of rifles striking the ground.

Xaxado was originally performed by cangaceiros groups, in particular the one led by Lampião, to celebrate their victories. It later was popularized by musician Luiz Gonzaga and practiced by mixed-gender groups. To this day, xaxado dancers' costumes evoke the clothing worn during the cangaço era.

The name xaxado comes from the noise made by the cangaceiros' sandals (alpercatas, traditional leather sandals) as they strike the sand during the dance (xa-xa-xa). The shuffling sound of sandals was also initially the core of the melody, accompanied by the sound of muskets striking the ground. Later, the dance was performed on the rhythm of baião, a type of forró.

== See also ==
- Cangaço

== Bibliography ==
- Cortes, G. (2000). DANCA, BRASIL! FESTAS E DANCAS POPULARES. Leitura. ISBN 8573583215
