= Carmélia Alves =

Brazilian singer (1923–2012)

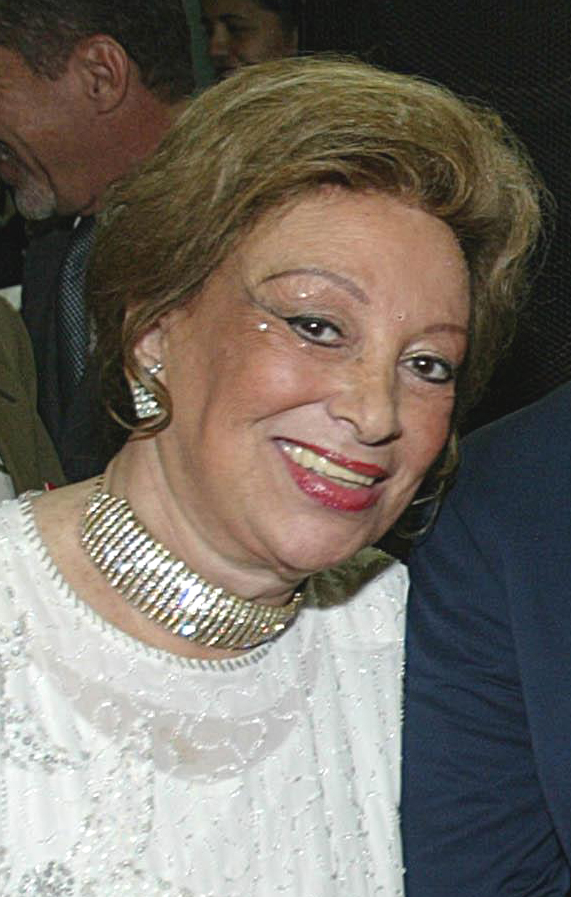
Carmélia Alves in 2004.

Carmélia Alves (14 February 1923 – 3 November 2012), a Brazilian singer known as the "Queen of Baião", was one of the country's best-known performers of baião, a folk rhythm popular in Northeast Brazil.

Carmélia Alves was born in the Bangu neighborhood of Rio de Janeiro. Her family moved to Areal in Petrópolis while she was very young, and she was raised there. Her father was from Ceara, and her mother was from Bahia, and her father was very interested in parties. He formed dance groups and organized blocos for Carnaval and festas juninas. Her father also sang Northeastern songs as lullabies for Carmélia Alves.

When Carmélia was 17 years old, she returned to Rio de Janeiro to study and began taking an interest in music. She was very interested in Carmen Miranda and listened to her music on Rádio Tupi.

Alves gained success in the 1950s with the hit "Sabiá na gaiola." She began her career at the Hotel Copacabana in Rio de Janeiro, where she performed covers of hits by Carmen Miranda. Her friend, baião and accordionist Luiz Gonzaga, exposed her to the music of Northeast Brazil and inspired her to devote the rest of her career to baião.

Alves was married for 50 years to singer Jimmy Lester, who died in 1998. They had no children. They performed together throughout the world, including Argentina, Germany and Mexico. Their success in Argentina prompted Alves to open a branch of her recording company in Buenos Aires. In 2000, she formed a group of professional singers from the 1950s.

== Death ==
Alves died from cancer and Alzheimer's disease at the Jacarepagua Hospital in Rio de Janeiro on 3 November 2012, at the age of 89.

== Greatest Hits ==
Chronological Order

- 1943 - Deixei de Sofrer
- 1944 - Quem Dorme no Ponto é Chofer
- 1949 - Me Leva (with Ivon Curi)
- 1950 - Coração Magoado
- 1950 - Trepa no Coqueiro
- 1951 - Sabiá na Gaiola
- 1951 - Pé de Manacá (with o Trio Madrigal)
- 1951 - Esta Noite Serenou
- 1951 - Cabeça Inchada
- 1956 - Cevando o Amargo
