= Zabumba =

Brazilian drum

A zabumba (Portuguese pronunciation: [zaˈbũbɐ]) is a type of bass drum used in Brazilian music. The player wears the drum while standing up and uses both hands while playing.

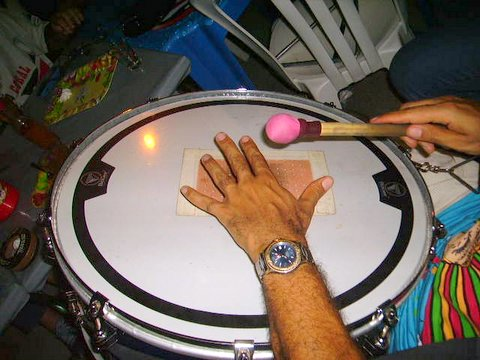

The zabumba generally ranges in diameter from 16 to 22 inches, and is 5 to 8 inches tall. The shell is made of wood and may utilize either skin or plastic drum heads and is usually tensioned via metal lugs and tension rods. The top head is usually muted with tape or cloth strip(s) and struck with a cloth-covered mallet (held in the right hand) to produce a low fundamental note with minimal overtones. The bottom head is tuned tighter and is struck with a thin, twig-like stick called a bacalhau which is held in the left hand to produce a high fundamental with a sharp attack and numerous overtones.

In construction, tuning and performance technique, the zabumba is very similar to bass drums found in the eastern Mediterranean region, such as the davul.

The zabumba is used in the genres of forró, coco, baião, xaxado and xote.
