= WM Recordings =

WM Recordings is a Heerlen, the Netherlands based record label founded in 2004, by Marco Kalnenek, who was also involved with Comfort Stand Recordings. Kalnenek also is the webmaster of Weirdomusic.com, a website nominated for a Webby Award in 2004.

WM Recordings focuses on music that is, in their own words, "a little different". They do not specialize in one style, but release anything from free jazz to experimental soundscapes, world music and other styles that are often neglected by other netlabels.

In 2007, WM Recordings started adding commercial releases to their catalog. These are available from most major download stores. August 2008 saw the release of their first physical CD: "Handle With Care - Might Panic" by Danish band Panicphobia.

== See also ==
- List of record labels
