= Manchester Local School District (Summit County) =

School district in Ohio

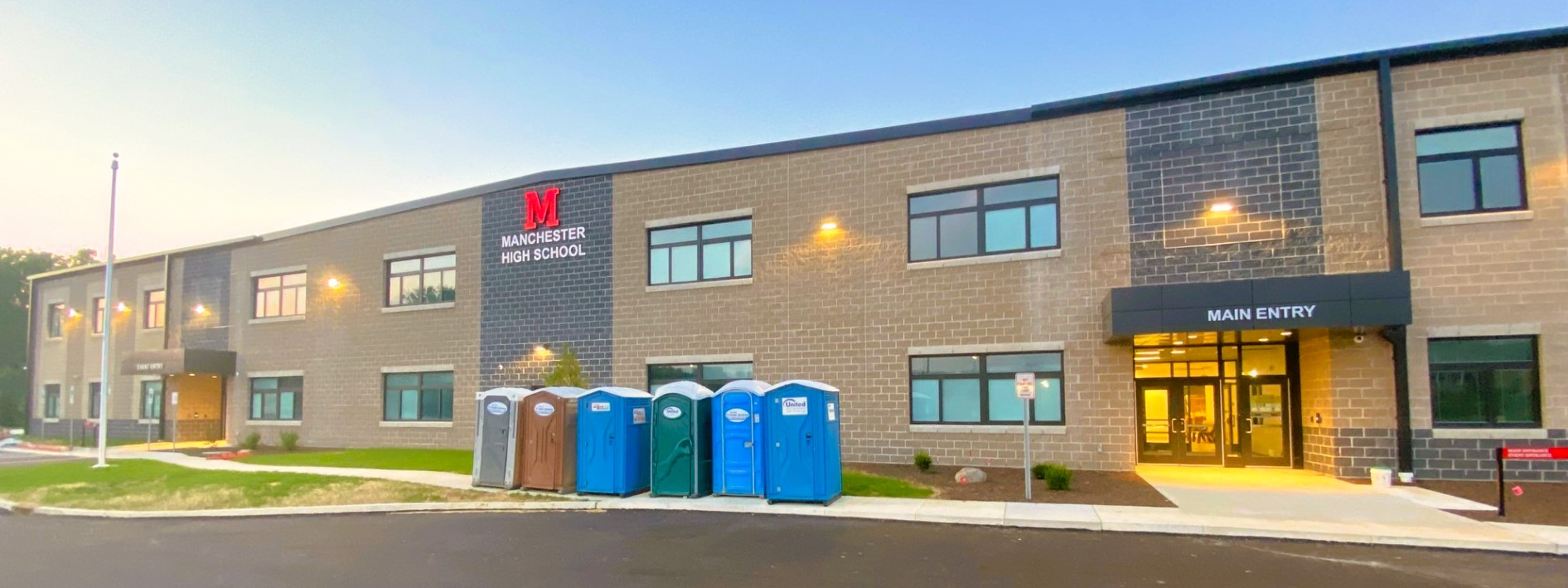
Finishing touches of the new High School still ongoing in August 2024.

Manchester Local School District is a school district in southern Summit County, Ohio that serves a large portion of the city of New Franklin.

== Board of education ==
Current members of the board of education include:

- Richard Sponseller (President)
- Cindy McDonald (Vice President)
- Joe Hercules
- Jason Jividen
- Mark Tallman

== Schools ==
There are three schools in the district:

- Manchester High School
  - Principal Scott Ross
  - Associate Principal Derek Mauger
- Manchester Middle School
  - Principal James Miller
- Gilbert T. Nolley Elementary School
  - Principal Christi Pappas

== District Enrollment Figures (K-12) ==
1965	1970	1974-75	1980	1985	1990	1995	2000	2005	2010	2015	2019	2020	2023
2,373	2,919	2,729	2,107	1,702	1,490	1,545	1,470	1,529	1,517	1,328	1,306	1,276	1,274
