= Xote =

Brazilian music and dance genre derived from the German "Schottische"

Xote (pronounced [ˈʃɔtʃi]) is a Brazilian music genre and dance with a binary or quaternary rhythm. It is the local equivalent of the German schottische. Xote is a common type of forró dancing.

The word xote is a corruption of the German word schottisch meaning Scottish; the schottische is related to the Scottish polka. The schottische was brought to Brazil by José Maria Toussaint in 1851, and it was a dance popular among the upper classes during the reign of Emperor Pedro II. Later, black slaves danced their own adaptations of the dance, adding their own influences, converting it into a dance that was more popular and well known. This period was when the style came to be known as xote or xótis.

The xote is a very versatile dance and has a number of local versions, such as the southern version called xote gaúcho.

The dance may incorporate steps from other Latin American dances, such as salsa, rumba and mambo.

== See also ==
- Schottische
- Chamamé
- Jenkka
