= Portage Lakes State Park =

Park in Ohio, USA

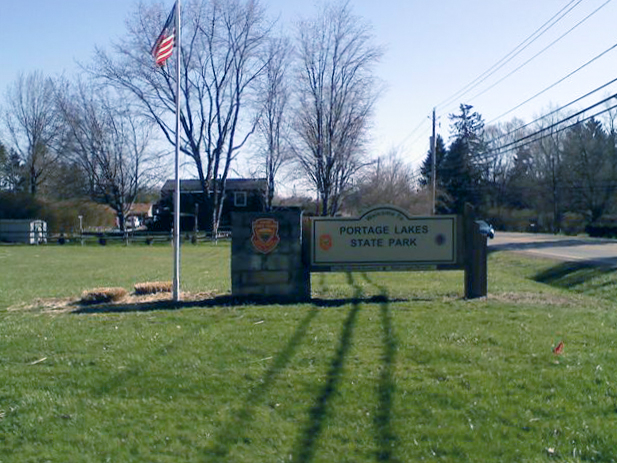
- Entrance sign

- Location within Ohio Location within the United States
- Location: Summit County, Ohio, United States
- Coordinates: 40°58′09″N 81°33′25″W
- Area: 411 acres (166 ha)
- Elevation: 1,027 feet (313 m)
- Established: 1949
- Administrator: Ohio Department of Natural Resources
- Designation: Ohio state park
- Website: Portage Lakes State Park

Portage Lakes State Park is a public recreation area located around the Portage Lakes in New Franklin, Ohio, in the United States. The eight Portage Lakes encompass 2,034 acres (823 ha) used for boating, fishing, and swimming. The Ohio Department of Public Works turned over maintenance of the lakes to the Ohio Department of Natural Resources Division of Parks and Recreation in 1949.
