= New Franklin, Ohio =

- City
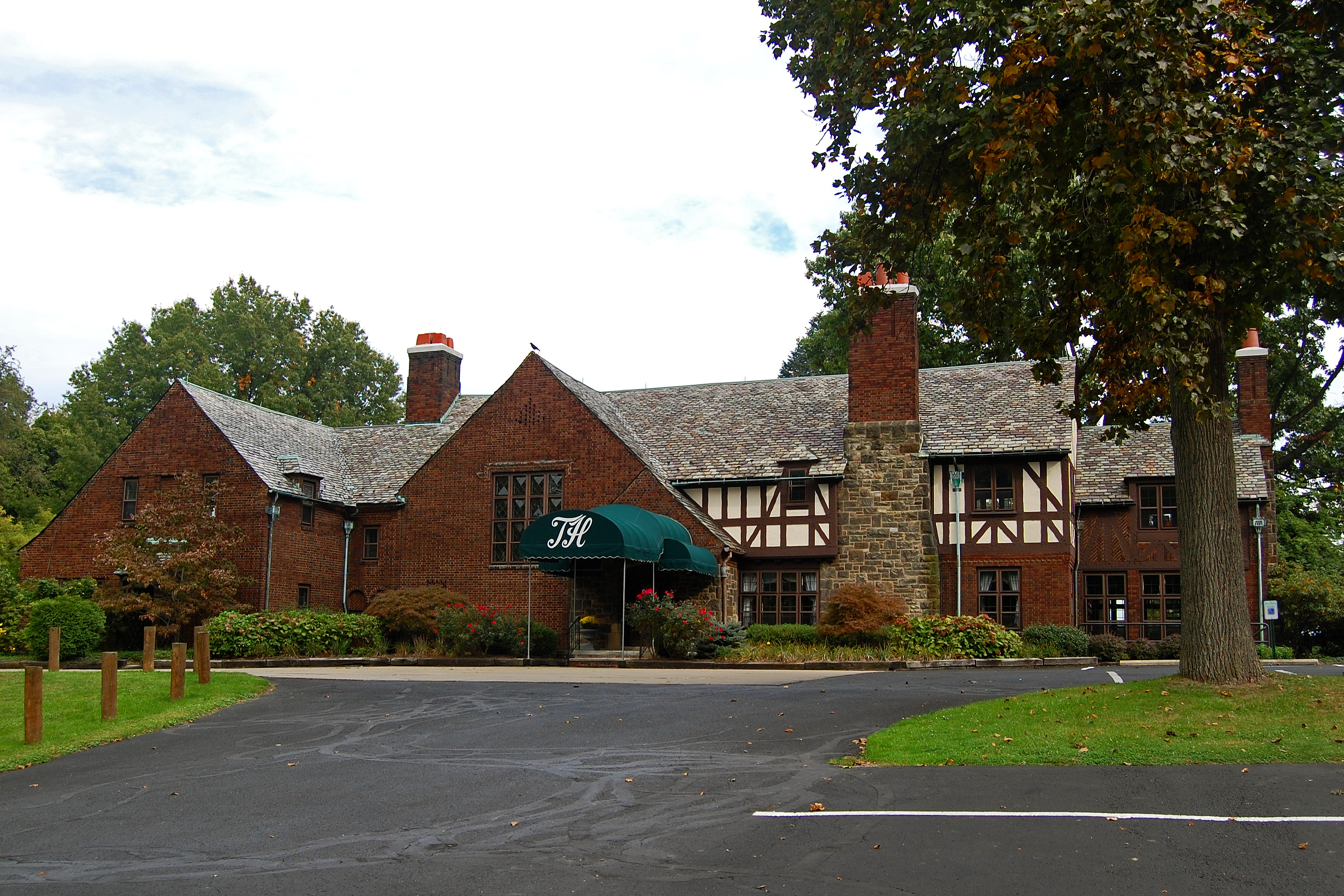
- The Frank Mason Raymond House, built 1913
- Interactive map of New Franklin, Ohio
- Location within Ohio Location within the United States
- Coordinates: 40°57′32″N 81°36′51″W
- Country: United States
- State: Ohio
- County: Summit

Area
  - Total: 26.63 sq mi (68.96 km^{2})
  - Land: 24.99 sq mi (64.72 km^{2})
  - Water: 1.64 sq mi (4.24 km^{2})
- Elevation: 1,158 ft (353 m)

Population (2020)
  - Total: 13,877
  - Density: 555.3/sq mi (214.42/km^{2})
- Time zone: UTC-5 (Eastern (EST))
  - Summer (DST): UTC-4 (EDT)
- ZIP Code: 44203, 44216, 44319, 44614
- Area codes: 234, 330
- FIPS code: 39-54562
- GNIS feature ID: 2395193
- Website: https://www.newfranklin.org/

New Franklin is a city in southwestern Summit County, Ohio, United States, in the northeastern part of the state. The population was 13,877 according to the 2020 census. It is part of the Akron metropolitan area.

== History ==
In 1997 the village of New Franklin was incorporated from a section of Franklin Township to thwart annexation attempts from neighboring cities. New Franklin expanded significantly in November 2003 when the residents of Franklin Township and New Franklin voted to merge the two entities, rendering Franklin Township in Summit County defunct. The merger took effect January 1, 2005. The village officially became a city on March 5, 2006.

On November 6, 2007, city residents voted against changing the city's name to Portage Lakes, 57% to 42%.

The area, originally known as Franklin Township, was founded in 1817. The village of New Franklin was a part of Franklin Township; its citizens were also citizens of Franklin Township.

== Geography ==
New Franklin is bounded by Coventry Township, as well as the cities of Barberton and Norton to the north; by Chippewa Township, Wayne County; by Clinton to the southwest; by Green to the east; by Lawrence Township, Stark County to the south.

According to the United States Census Bureau, the city has a total area of 26.627 square miles (68.96 km^{2}), of which 24.988 square miles (64.72 km^{2}) is land and 1.639 square miles (4.24 km^{2}) is water.

New Franklin is home to Portage Lakes State Park and Craftsmen Park.

== Demographics ==
Historical population
Census	Pop.	Note	%±
2000	2,191		—
2010	14,227		549.3%
2020	13,877		−2.5%
2025 (est.)	13,873		0.0%

=== 2020 census ===
As of the 2020 census, New Franklin had a population of 13,877. The median age was 47.5 years. 19.0% of residents were under the age of 18 and 22.5% of residents were 65 years of age or older. For every 100 females there were 99.3 males, and for every 100 females age 18 and over there were 98.5 males age 18 and over.

75.8% of residents lived in urban areas, while 24.2% lived in rural areas.

There were 5,661 households in New Franklin, of which 24.1% had children under the age of 18 living in them. Of all households, 56.3% were married-couple households, 16.7% were households with a male householder and no spouse or partner present, and 20.0% were households with a female householder and no spouse or partner present. About 24.6% of all households were made up of individuals and 12.6% had someone living alone who was 65 years of age or older.

There were 6,031 housing units, of which 6.1% were vacant. The homeowner vacancy rate was 1.2% and the rental vacancy rate was 6.0%.

Racial composition as of the 2020 census
Race	Number	Percent
White	13,004	93.7%
Black or African American	86	0.6%
American Indian and Alaska Native	27	0.2%
Asian	57	0.4%
Native Hawaiian and Other Pacific Islander	4	0.0%
Some other race	68	0.5%
Two or more races	631	4.5%
Hispanic or Latino (of any race)	153	1.1%

=== 2010 census ===
As of the census of 2010, there were 14,227 people, 5,640 households, and 4,110 families living in the city. The population density was 568.2 inhabitants per square mile (219.4/km^{2}). There were 6,014 housing units at an average density of 240.2 units per square mile (92.7 units/km^{2}). The racial makeup of the city was 97.7% White, 0.6% African American, 0.1% Native American, 0.4% Asian, 0.2% from other races, and 1.0% from two or more races. Hispanic or Latino of any race were 0.8% of the population.

There were 5,640 households, of which 28.5% had children under the age of 18 living with them, 59.9% were married couples living together, 8.5% had a female householder with no husband present, 4.5% had a male householder with no wife present, and 27.1% were non-families. 22.5% of all households were made up of individuals, and 10.2% had someone living alone who was 65 years of age or older. The average household size was 2.51 and the average family size was 2.93.

The median age in the city was 45.5 years. 21.2% of residents were under the age of 18; 7% were between the ages of 18 and 24; 21% were from 25 to 44; 33% were from 45 to 64; and 17.7% were 65 years of age or older. The gender makeup of the city was 49.5% male and 50.5% female.

=== 2000 census ===
As of the census of 2000, there were 2,191 people, 867 households, and 647 families living in the village. The population density was 985.2 inhabitants per square mile (380.4/km^{2}). There were 911 housing units at an average density of 409.6 units per square mile (158.1 units/km^{2}). The racial makeup of the village was 98.40% White, 0.46% African American, 0.23% Native American, 0.37% Asian, 0.09% Pacific Islander, 0.05% from other races, and 0.41% from two or more races. Hispanic or Latino of any race were 0.23% of the population.

There were 867 households, out of which 30.6% had children under the age of 18 living with them, 65.7% were married couples living together, 6.2% had a female householder with no husband present, and 25.3% were non-families. 22.5% of all households were made up of individuals, and 11.2% had someone living alone who was 65 years of age or older. The average household size was 2.53 and the average family size was 2.97.

In the village the population was spread out, with 22.8% under the age of 18, 6.7% from 18 to 24, 25.9% from 25 to 44, 27.2% from 45 to 64, and 17.3% who were 65 years of age or older. The median age was 42 years. For every 100 females, there were 98.3 males. For every 100 females age 18 and over, there were 97.1 males.

The median income for a household in the village was $50,944, and the median income for a family was $57,667. Males had a median income of $40,586 versus $27,130 for females. The per capita income for the village was $23,231. About 3.9% of families and 4.8% of the population were below the poverty line, including 4.1% of those under age 18 and 4.2% of those age 65 or over.

== Education ==
New Franklin is served by four public school districts. In the northern part of the city, students are part of the Coventry Local School District while students in the extreme northwestern part of the city attend Norton City Schools. Students in the western part of the city, as well as the village of Clinton, are served by the Northwest Local School District in Canal Fulton. The eastern half of New Franklin is served by the Manchester Local School District.

== Notable people ==
- George Sisler, first baseman in Baseball Hall of Fame
