= Forró =

Music genre from the Northeast region of Brazil

- Cultural origins: 19th century, Sertão, Brazil

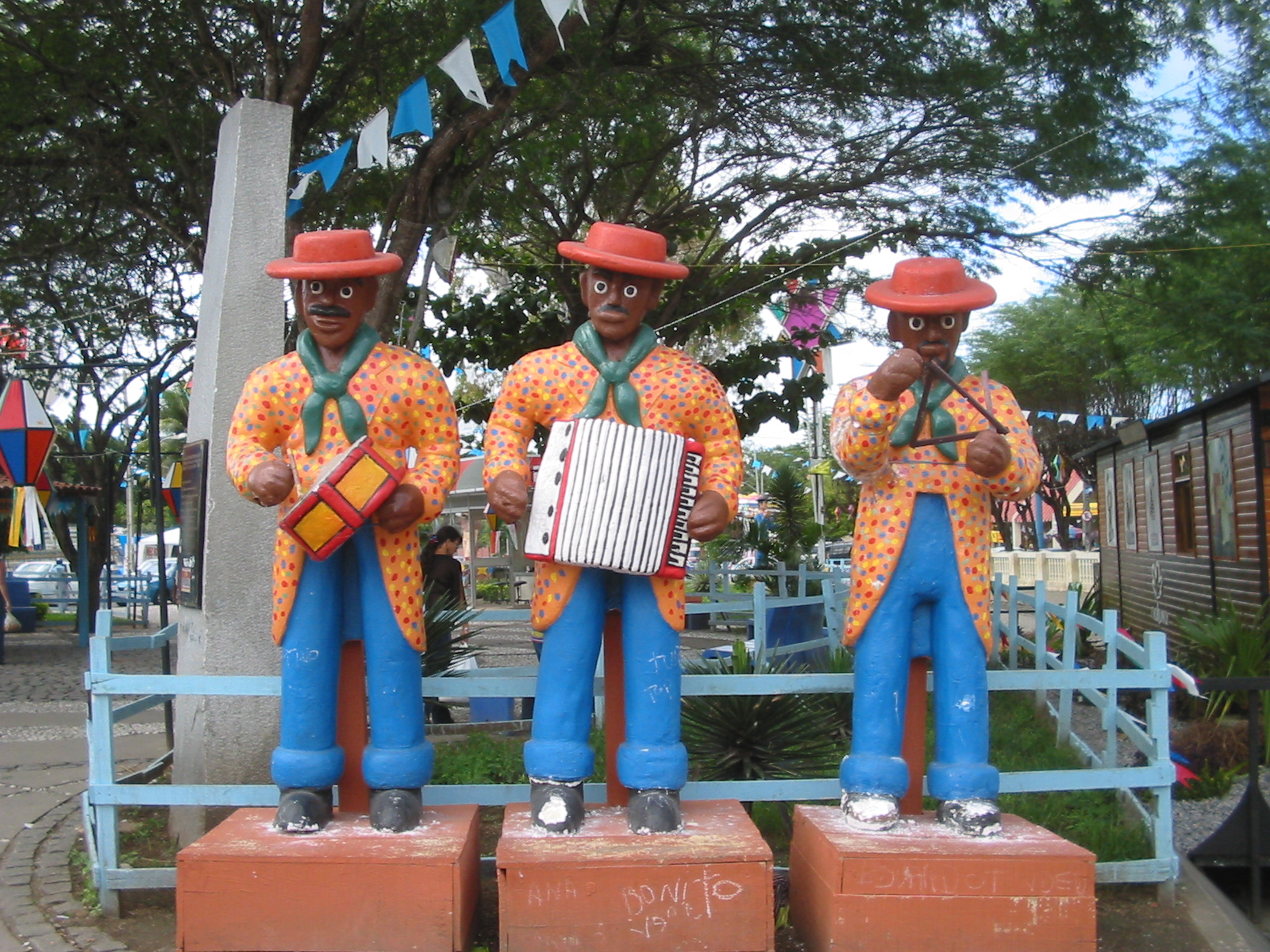
Statues of Forró musicians

The term forró (Brazilian Portuguese pronunciation: [fɔˈʁɔ]) refers to a musical genre, a rhythm, a dance and the event itself where forró music is played and danced. Forró is an important part of the culture of the Northeastern Region of Brazil. It encompasses various dance types as well as a number of different musical genres. Their music genres and dances have gained widespread popularity in all regions of Brazil, especially during the Brazilian June Festivals. Forró has also become increasingly popular all over the world, with a well-established forró scene in Europe. It received recognition as a cultural heritage in Brazil in 2021.

== Origin of the music ==
The forrós were popular dances that took place in certain locations, using various rhythms. Forró as a festivity and musical genre has its joint origin in several states of the Brazilian Northeast, emerging in the outskirts of the capitals and in the countryside of the states of Bahia, Pernambuco, Paraíba, Rio Grande do Norte, and Alagoas. Forró encompasses various rural rhythms from several northeastern states, such as baião, xote, arrasta pé, xaxado, coco, rural samba, among many other rhythms.

The popular dances, according to the Pernambucan press, were known as "forrobodó" or "forrobodança" or even "forrobodão" already by the end of the 19th century.

== Origin of the term ==
There are several theories on the origin of the name. The main theory is that forró is a clipping of forrobodó, meaning "great party" or "commotion". This is the view held by Brazilian folklorist Luís da Câmara Cascudo, who studied the Brazilian Northeast through most of his life. Forrobodó is believed to come from the Galician–Portuguese word forbodó (itself a corruption of fauxbourdon), which was used in the Portuguese court to define a dull party. The word forrobodó is itself very common in Portuguese popular conversation to describe a fun, but almost depraved and limitless party. This word was carried by Portuguese migration waves to Brazil, and lost the light negative meaning and was slowly simplified by their children.

== Popularity ==
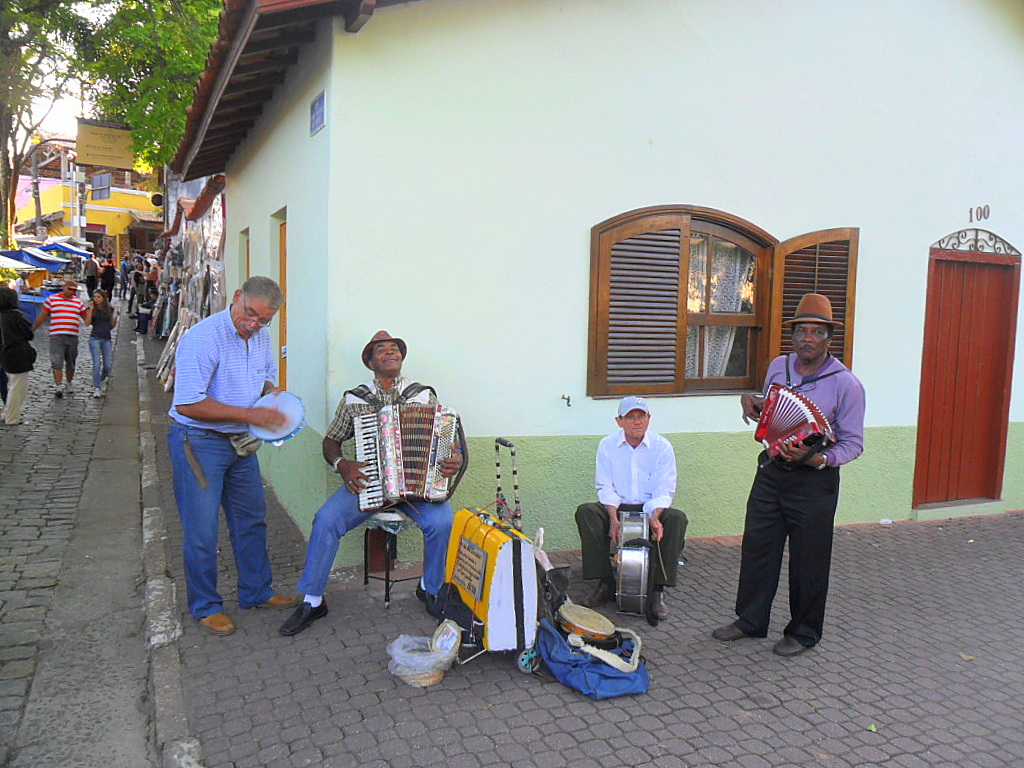
The city of Embu das Artes, Brazil

Forró is the most popular genre of music and dance in Brazil's Northeast, to the extent that historically "going to the forró" meant simply going to party or going out. The music is based on a combination of three instruments (accordion, zabumba and a metal triangle). The dance however becomes very different as you cross the borders of the Northeast into the Southeast. As part of the popular culture it is in constant change. The dance known as college forró is the most common style between the middle-class students of colleges and universities in the Southeast, having influences of other dances like salsa and samba-rock.

The traditional music used to dance the forró was brought to the Southeast from the Northeast by Luiz Gonzaga, who transformed the baião (a word originated from baiano and assigned a warm-up for artists to search for inspiration before playing) into a more sophisticated rhythm. In later years, forró achieved popularity throughout Brazil, in the form of a slower genre known as xote, that has been influenced by pop-rock music to become more acceptable by Brazilian youth of Southeast, South and Central regions.

A compilation album titled Brazil: Forró - Music for Maids and Taxi Drivers was released internationally in 1989, and was nominated for a Grammy Award in the United States two years later.

== Music ==
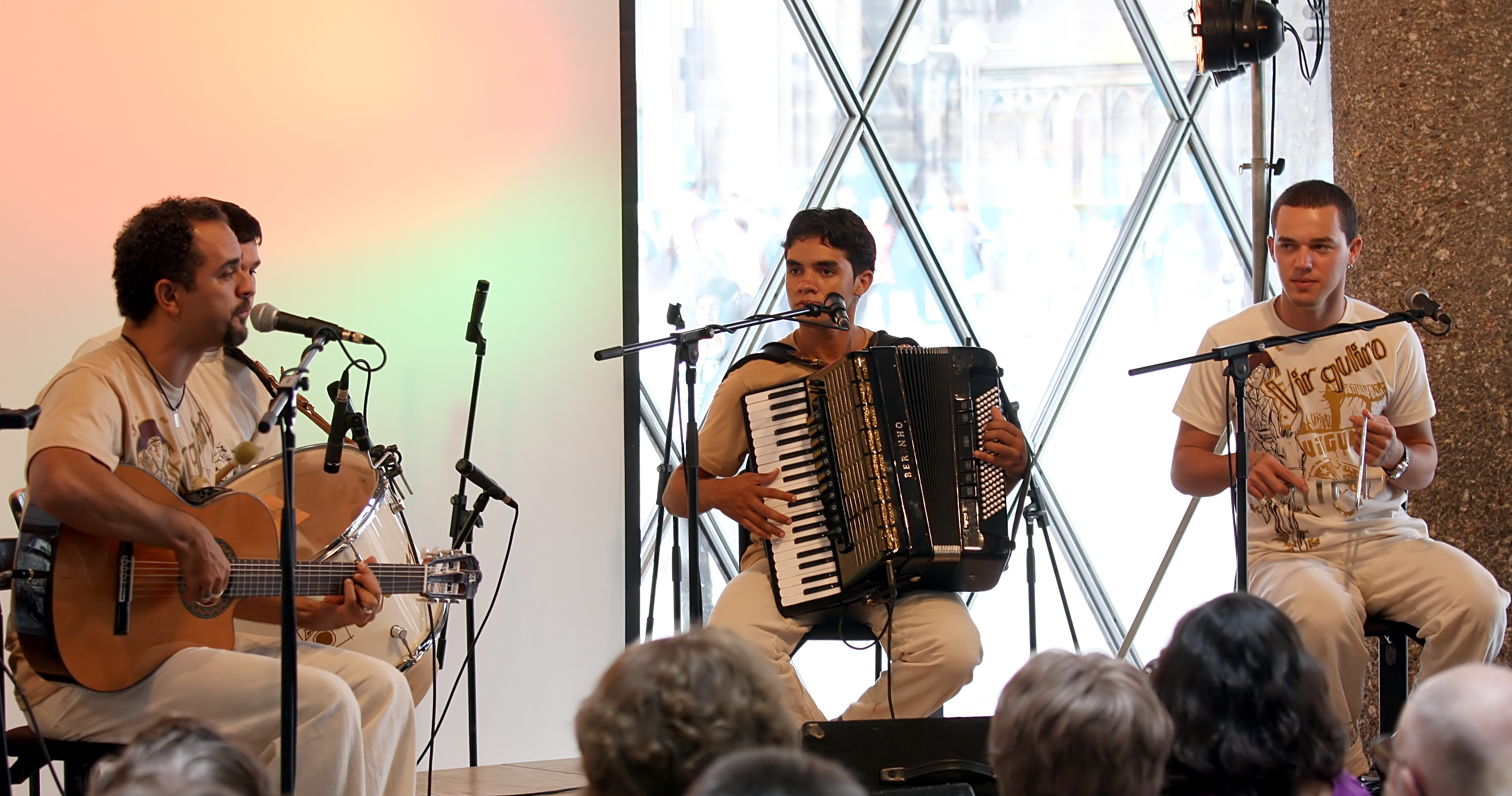
Valdir Santos plays Forró

Forró, referring to the music and not the dance, encompasses today various musical styles. The original musical style, from which have grown most of the musical styles today denoted as forró, was the forró of Luiz Gonzaga (and others such as Jackson do Pandeiro and Marinês).

This musical style, commonly called also forró pé-de-serra, is played by a trio combination of

- an accordion (with a dry tuning, as opposed to the wet tunings used more commonly in Europe) and a
- rhythm section of a triangle and a zabumba (where the triangle keeps an ongoing pulse and the zabumba is responsible for the different syncopated rhythms in the forró genre).

This combination of instruments was defined as the base of forró by Luiz Gonzaga. Before Gonzaga other combinations have been commonly used. The combination of triangle with accordion is a combination that has already existed in European folk music before and is also used in Cajun music in the United States. Forró thus conserves a format of a small ensemble with multiple (in this case two) percussionists, something that also used to be common in Europe and the United States before the era of the drum set.

This combination of instruments serves rather as a base and is not fixed, incorporating sometimes other instruments such as fiddle, flute, pandeiro, bass, cavaquinho and acoustic guitar.

The combination of zabumba and triangle is almost always part of the rhythm section of any forró group. The accordion is always part of a forró ensemble, apart from the sub-style of "forró rabecado", where the accordion is replaced by a fiddle.

The triangle keeps an ongoing pulse on all the sixteenth notes of the 4/4 beat, while accentuating the third sixteenth. In this sense, the function can be compared to the rhythm guitar or the hi-hat of the drum set in rock music, although the triangle accentuates the third beat more strongly with its high pitched metallic sound, being damped to give a fainter and drier sound on the other beats. The zabumba, which is played on both sides, on one side giving a grave sound and on the other a sharp whip-like sound, plays the syncopated rhythms essential to forró.

Forró makes heavy use of the escala nordestina (literally North-eastern scale), which could be characterised as being a mixture of the Lydian and Mixo-lydian modes. The North-eastern scale represents the basis of a large part of the more traditional forró and the forró pé-de-serra, similar to the way the blues scale is the basis for the music of the Mississippi Delta. The escala nordestina is most evident in pieces such as "Vem Morena", baião of Luiz Gonzaga. The accordion is the typical melody instrument used in forró, and is sometimes called the "Soul of Forró" or the "Soul of the Sertão", referring the region where Forró has originated.

As forró diversified away from its roots, it has incorporated other influences, and more significantly, diversified into quite distinct musical styles.

=== Lyrics and themes ===
Forró lyrics have changed with time and regarding the subgenre, as the music moved from being a purely North-Eastern music genre to being a genre popular all across Brazil.

Traditionally, lyrics were about life in the rural North-East (in particular the Sertão) and other North-Eastern themes, such as concerns about droughts, migration to look for work and thus about longing or homesickness (saudade).

An example of this is the probably most emblematic (anonymous) song "Asa Branca", made famous across all of Brazil in the 1940s by Luiz Gonzaga, sometimes also called the "Hymn of the Sertão" or "Hymn of the North-East". The lyrics are about leaving the rural home in the Sertão because of drought, and about hope to be able to return when the rain will fall again on the dry, barren land of the Sertão. The rain will be announced by the arrival of asa branca, a certain white winged bird, which only flies there if it rains (there is a recent American version played by the group Forro in the Dark featuring David Byrne).

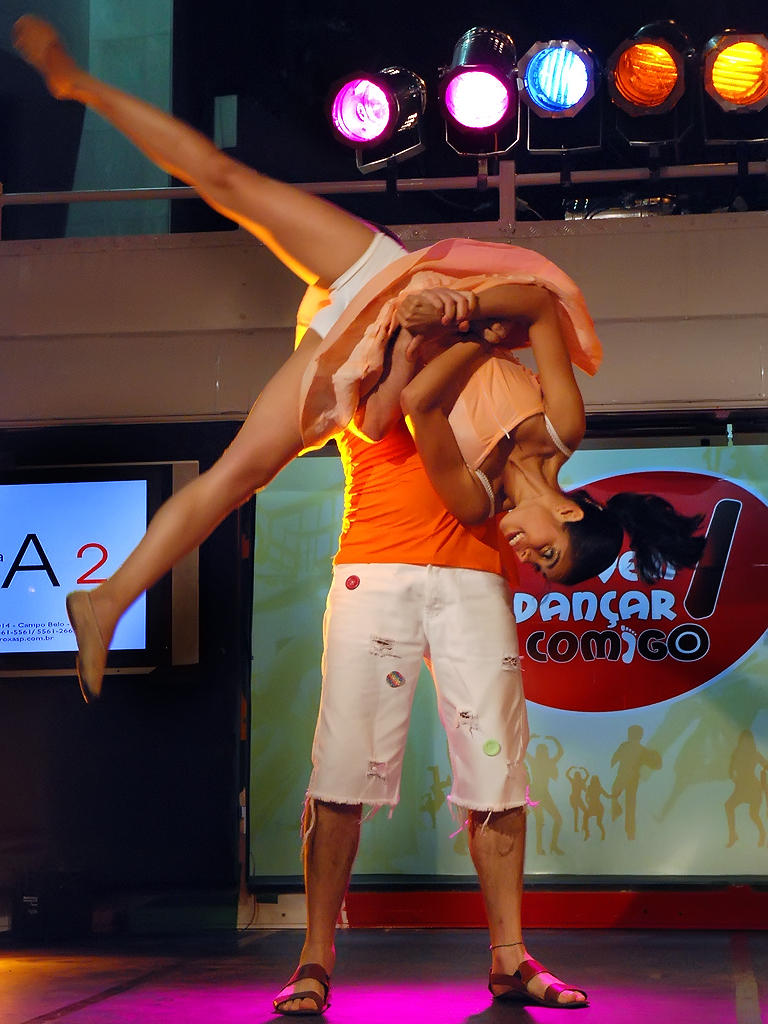
Forró

In the more recent genre of forró universitario, lyrics have a much more urban flavour and relate more to life of a young urbanized middle class, as lyrics found nowadays in rock music.

As in many other musical styles, lyrics are also often about love and romance, passion, jealousy, or reminiscing about an ex-lover.

=== Instruments ===
Today various musical instruments are used in the various styles of forró (although always with a reference to the traditional combination of accordion, triangle and zabumba):

- Accordion
- Acoustic guitar
- Bass guitar
- Drum kit
- Electric guitar
- Fiddle
- Pandeiro
- Pífano
- Rabeca
- Shaker
- Triangle (musical instrument)
- Zabumba drum

== "Electronic" forró (modern forró) ==
Starting in the 1990s, forró music experienced renewed aesthetics, becoming a more "commercial" genre of Brazilian pop music. A forró music industry developed in Northeastern Brazil in that decade, when many new bands (with names like "Mastruz Com Leite" and "Limão Com Mel") were started, bands that used drums, electronic keyboards and electric guitars, and the lyrics of the songs became more similar to the lyrics of the sertanejo genre of Brazilian music, talking about romantic relationships and similar themes. Due to the use of electric guitars and electronic keyboards this new kind of forró music was initially called forró eletrônico ("electronic forró" in Portuguese). In the following decades this new kind of forró became much more popular in Northeastern Brazil than "traditional" forró.

== Dance ==
=== Dancing styles ===
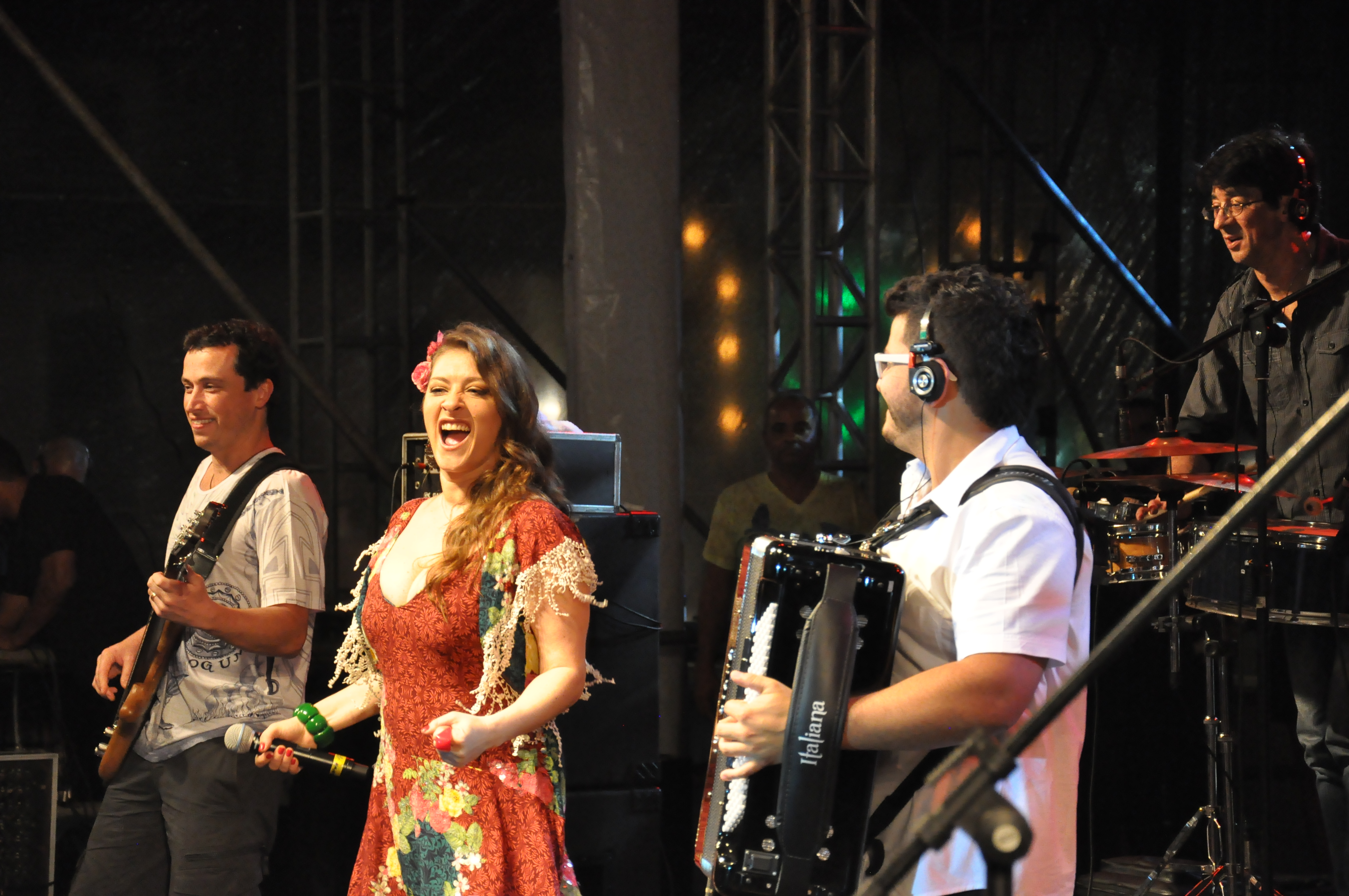
Bicho de pé

There are various rhythms of forró: xote (a slower-paced rhythm), baião (the original forró) and arrasta-pé (the fastest), and forró itself. Amongst these there are many styles of dancing, which varies from region to region, and may be known by different names according to the location. Forró is danced in pairs. There are two dance roles, one of the leader and one of the follower. Especially in European forró communities, there is a trend to break and discuss the traditional gender roles of leading men and following women. Unlike many other social dances it becomes more and more common to see same-sex couples on the dance floor or leading women and following men.

Forró is danced usually very close together, with the leader's left hand holding the follower's right hand, the leader's right arm around the follower's back and the follower's left arm around the leader's neck. Other styles may require to stay partially away, or in a considerable distance, only holding their hands up the shoulders.

Influences from Cuban salsa, Samba de Gafieira and zouk has given mobility to forró, with the follower— and occasionally the leader— being spun, although it's not essential to spin at all. The more complex movements may prove impossible to be executed in the usually crowded dancing area of forrós. Below is a list of the most popular styles of forró in Brazil:

==== Xote ====
- Xote: a basic style, danced close together in a left-left-right-right movement and has no spinning or variations;
- Universitário: the most popular style outside the Northeast, much like the xote, but with the partners moving forward and backward, much like traditional bolero. It contains many variations of movements;
- Miudinho: the leader dances with their left side slightly tilted, their left hand on the follower's waist and both the follower's hands around the leader's neck. It is danced in the same place (mobility can be gained through spinning) and has a lot of hip movements;
- Puladinho/manquinho: is danced with the leader's right leg still and their left leg marking the beats on the ground, while the follower with their left leg still and their right leg moving (the partners can exchange the leg positions, although it's not common);
- Merenguinho: the partners move along the sides, with movements similar to merengue dance;
- Cavalguinho: much like the puladinho, but with the leader and follower marking both their legs on the ground in alternate tempos, as if riding a horse.

Xote originally has its roots in the schottische.

==== Baião ====
- Baião/pé-de-serra: basically a style of xote, but with the partners tilting to the sides and moving their legs less to follow the faster rhythm;
- Cacau: comes from Paraíba, in which the partners dance slightly away from each other in very fast leg movements;
- Amassa-cacau: a variation of cacau from Ceará, it's danced less close and demands a lot of hip movements, with the legs mimicking a person squeezing cacao;
- Valsado: danced close together, consists of moving along the sides, crossing the legs in front of each other;
- Valsadão: same as valsado, but danced slightly away from each other. It is, together with universitário, the richest style in terms of movements and variations;
- Forrófieira: a newer style, mixes the traditional forró with steps and influence from samba de gafieira, and it has become quite popular in Rio de Janeiro and some parts of Northeast.

==== Arrasta-pé ====
- Arrasta-pé: can only be danced to its own style, much like a very fast xote, but alternately marking the beats on the ground with both legs.

Miudinho and puladinho can be danced to baião music and even to arrasta-pé, but in the latter the leg work is so intense that it's impracticable. Some people like to include brega/calypso in the forró category, because this dance has suffered much influence of forró throughout the decades, but it's danced to its own rhythm (not to be confused with calypso music).

=== Steps ===
Forró dancing styles are informally often grouped into two main "families", simply for practical reasons: The older Nordestino (north-eastern) type of forró and the universitário (university) forró that developed later in the South.

Nordestino forró is danced with the couple much closer together, with their legs often inter-twined and a characteristic sideways shuffle movement. Because of the intimacy, there are not as many step variations in this style.

Universitário forró, with its origins in the big southern cities of Brazil, is the more popular style outside of the Northeast. Its basic step is forward-backwards — slightly similar to traditional bolero or salsa in line. With more space between the pair, many more moves, steps and turns are possible than in Nordestino styles. The more common steps include:

- Dobradiça: the couple opens to the side;
- Caminhada: simple step of the couple to the front or the back;
- Comemoração: balancing step, with the leader's leg between the follower's;
- Giros: a variety of turns, both simple and ones involving the dancers;
- Oito: a movement of the dancers around each other, side by side.

Universitário forró supposedly evolved from (and is very similar to) the pé-de-serra/baião styles, while Nordestino is used to refer to the styles more like the original xote.

== International forró festivals ==
The first forró festival outside Brazil was in 2008; 'Forró de Domingo' in Stuttgart, Germany and since its last edition in 2018, it was the biggest forró festival outside Brazil. A dance performance from the 2014 edition has more than 54 million views on YouTube and is the most watched forró performance on this platform. Today, there are many more annually forró festivals celebrated in Germany and other parts of Europe. Since 2016, festivals have also been organised in North America, Russia, Oceania and Japan. In 2019, over 70 international festivals were planned outside of Brazil.

== Notes ==
^{*}Guttural R, when spoken in the Central northeastern Portuguese, is usually pronounced as a voiced or voiceless glottal fricative, in the beginning of words or "rr" digraph.
