= Baião (music) =

Northeastern Brazilian music genre and dance style

Baião (Portuguese pronunciation: [baˈjɐ̃w]) or "baiano" is a Northeastern Brazilian music genre and dance style based on a syncopated duple meter rhythm, based around the pulse of the zabumba, a flat, double-headed bass drum played with a mallet in one hand and a stick in the other, each striking the opposite head of the drum for alternating high and low notes, frequently accompanied by an accordion and a triangle pattern. The baião rhythm is integral to the genres of forró, repente and coco (or embolada). Baião was popularized via radio in the 1940s, reaching peak popularity in the 1950s.

== Description ==
Amerindian elements include the use of flutes, later replaced by the accordion, and wooden Shaker; African-influenced baião might be accompanied by atabaque drums and include overlapping call and response singing; and European influences include the use of the triangle, Western harmony, and dance music such as the quadrille, polka, mazurka, and schottische, heavy influences to forró, a dance-oriented variant. Repente music uses the baião rhythm in the context of acoustic guitar-centric vocal music, featuring the singing of improvised or pre-written lyrics in a specific meter and sometimes accompanied by the baião-style accordion and rhythm section. Some instances were accompanied by European-style orchestras.

According to Guerra Peixe, baião mostly borrows harmonically from European music tradition and uses the minor mode and the major scale (Ionian mode), Mixolydian, Lydian and Dorian modes, and the first, second, fourth and fifth scale degrees in chord progressions. The supertonic frequently appears with an augmented fourth. It is notated in duple meter (2/4 time) and most frequently uses eighth notes, quarter notes, half notes, and dotted whole notes.

== History ==
Baião originated sometime before the 20th century in the Bahia region in the Northeast of Brazil. It later gradually incorporated elements of many other indigenous traditions, and mestizo, African, and European music, as well as evolving a reputation as dance music. It is said by historian and folklorist Câmara Cascudo to already have been a popular dance since at least the late 19th century, and to have been propelled into the mainstream by the 1946 success of Luiz Gonzaga, which replaced a bolero fad in Brazil.

Like early sertanejo and caipira music, baião and its subgenres are associated with rural living. Baião's reputation as rural music liked by lower-class people caused its avoidance by much of the urban upper class for much of the 20th century. Although previously not well known outside its native region, a conscious decision by 1960s MPB and Tropicália musicians to embrace and reference traditional and folk music saw a resurgence of baião rhythms. A key record in this revival was the 1967 album by Quarteto Novo.

Despite the relatively small area of its greater popularity, a great variety of music is associated with baião, reflecting its status as traditional music and traditional dance in the Northeast. Some key artists are Luiz Gonzaga and Dominguinhos, both hailing from Pernambuco, Pedro Sertanejo and Trio Nordestino, both hailing from Bahia, Humberto Teixeira, Sivuca, Carmélia Alves, Selma do Côco and repentistas such as Perdal Lins and Verde Lins.

== In popular culture ==
Baião is featured in the 1951 Italian film Anna and is known both by its original name El Negro Zumbón (The Jolly Black Man) and as Anna's Baión.

== See also ==
- Arrocha
- Chôro
- Frevo
- Seresta
