= Brazil at the 2007 Pan American Games =

- IOC code: BRA
- NOC: Brazilian Olympic Committee
- Website: www.cob.org.br

in Rio de Janeiro 13–29 July 2007
- Competitors: 659 (373 men and 286 women) in 41 sports
- Flag bearer: Vanderlei Cordeiro de Lima
- Medals Ranked 3rd: Gold 52 Silver 40 Bronze 65 Total 157

Pan American Games appearances (overview)
- 1951; 1955; 1959; 1963; 1967; 1971; 1975; 1979; 1983; 1987; 1991; 1995; 1999; 2003; 2007; 2011; 2015; 2019; 2023

The 15th Pan-American Games were held in Rio de Janeiro, Brazil, between 13 July 2007 and 29 July 2007. The Brazilian delegation consisted of 659 athletes (373 men and 286 women) and 267 directors, making a total of 926 people in 41 sports. Competing in their own country, the Brazilian athletes managed to far surpass their own record number of Gold, Silver and Bronze medals obtained in a single edition of the Pan-American Games.

== Goals ==
The Rio de Janeiro Mayor and Brazilian Olympic Group wanted to show that Brazil is capable to receive the 2014 World Cup, for which is the only candidate so far, and that the city is eligible to host the 2016 Summer Olympics.

Another mission of Brazil was to achieve the 2nd position among the top History Pan-American Winners.

The COB also used the competition to prepare itself for the 2008 Summer Olympics.

== Medalists ==
The following competitors from Brazil won medals at the games. In the by discipline sections below, medalists' names are bolded.

Medal	Name	Sport	Event	Date
1st place, gold medalist(s)	Diogo Silva	Taekwondo	Men's 68 kg	15 July
1st place, gold medalist(s)	Thiago Pereira	Swimming	Men's 400-metre individual medley	17 July
1st place, gold medalist(s)	Thiago Pereira; Rodrigo Castro; Lucas Salatta; Nicolas Oliveira	Swimming	Men's 4 × 200-metre freestyle relay	17 July
1st place, gold medalist(s)	Diego Hypólito	Gymnastics	Men's floor	17 July
1st place, gold medalist(s)	Jade Barbosa	Gymnastics	Women's vault	17 July
1st place, gold medalist(s)	Diego Hypólito	Gymnastics	Men's vault	17 July
1st place, gold medalist(s)	Mosiah Rodrigues	Gymnastics	Men's horizontal bar	17 July
1st place, gold medalist(s)	César Cielo	Swimming	Men's 100-metre freestyle	18 July
1st place, gold medalist(s)	Kaio Almeida	Swimming	Men's 100-metre butterfly	18 July
1st place, gold medalist(s)	Thiago Pereira	Swimming	Men's 200-metre backstroke	19 July
1st place, gold medalist(s)	Thiago Pereira	Swimming	Men's 200-metre individual medley	20 July
1st place, gold medalist(s)	Fernando Silva; Eduardo Deboni; Nicolas Oliveira; César Cielo	Swimming	Men's 4 × 100-metre freestyle relay	20 July
1st place, gold medalist(s)	Tiago Camilo	Judo	Men's 90 kg	20 July
1st place, gold medalist(s)	Edinanci Silva	Judo	Women´s 78 kg	20 July
1st place, gold medalist(s)	Brazil women's national handball team	Handball	Women's tournament	20 July
1st place, gold medalist(s)	Kaio Almeida	Swimming	Men's 200-metre butterfly	21 July
1st place, gold medalist(s)	Thiago Pereira	Swimming	Men's 200-metre breaststroke	21 July
1st place, gold medalist(s)	Danielle Zangrando	Judo	Women´s 57 kg	21 July
1st place, gold medalist(s)	Brazil men's national handball team	Handball	Men's tournament	21 July
1st place, gold medalist(s)	Juliana Felisberta; Larissa França	Beach volleyball	Women's tournament	21 July
1st place, gold medalist(s)	César Cielo	Swimming	Men's 50-metre freestyle	22 July
1st place, gold medalist(s)	João Derly	Judo	Men's 66 kg	22 July
1st place, gold medalist(s)	Ricardo Santos; Emanuel Rego	Beach volleyball	Men's tournament	22 July
1st place, gold medalist(s)	Marcel Sturmer	Roller sports	Men's free skating	22 July
1st place, gold medalist(s)	Marcelo Giardi	Water skiing	Men's wakeboard	23 July
1st place, gold medalist(s)	Yane Marques	Modern pentathlon	Women's	23 July
1st place, gold medalist(s)	Fabiana Murer	Athletics	Women's pole vault	23 July
1st place, gold medalist(s)	Hugo Hoyama; Thiago Monteiro; Gustavo Tsuboi	Table tennis	Men's team	24 July
1st place, gold medalist(s)	Juarez Santos	Karate	Men's +80 kg	25 July
1st place, gold medalist(s)	Lucélia Ribeiro	Karate	Women's +60 kg	25 July
1st place, gold medalist(s)	Maurren Maggi	Athletics	Women's long jump	25 July
1st place, gold medalist(s)	Hudson de Souza	Athletics	Men's 1500 metres	25 July
1st place, gold medalist(s)	Brazil women's national football team	Football	Women's tournament	26 July
1st place, gold medalist(s)	Roberto Maheler; Carlos Campos; Sebastian Cuattrin; Edson Isaias	Canoeing	Men's K-4 1000 metres	27 July
1st place, gold medalist(s)	Bernardo Alves; Pedro Veniss; César Almeida; Rodrigo Pessoa	Equestrian	Team jumping	27 July
1st place, gold medalist(s)	Pedro Lima	Boxing	Men's 69 kg	27 July
1st place, gold medalist(s)	Daniela Leite; Tayanne Mantovaneli; Luisa Matsuo; Marcela Menezes; Nicole Muller; Natália Sanchez	Gymnastics	Women's rhythmic group all-around	27 July
1st place, gold medalist(s)	Juliana Paula dos Santos	Athletics	Women's 1500 metres	27 July
1st place, gold medalist(s)	Brazil national futsal team	Futsal	Men's tournament	28 July
1st place, gold medalist(s)	Alexandre Paradeda; Pedro Amaral	Sailing	Snipe class	28 July
1st place, gold medalist(s)	Mauricio Oliveira; Carlos Jordão; Alexandre Silva; Daniel Santiago	Sailing	J/24 class	28 July
1st place, gold medalist(s)	Ricardo Santos	Sailing	Men's sailboard	28 July
1st place, gold medalist(s)	Daniela Leite; Tayanne Mantovaneli; Luisa Matsuo; Marcela Menezes; Nicole Muller; Natália Sanchez	Gymnastics	Women's rhythmic group 5 ropes	28 July
1st place, gold medalist(s)	Daniela Leite; Tayanne Mantovaneli; Luisa Matsuo; Marcela Menezes; Nicole Muller; Natália Sanchez	Gymnastics	Women's rhythmic group 3 hoops + 4 clubs	28 July
1st place, gold medalist(s)	Sabine Heitling	Athletics	Women's 3000 metres steeplechase	28 July
1st place, gold medalist(s)	Jadel Gregório	Athletics	Men's triple jump	28 July
1st place, gold medalist(s)	Fábio Gomes da Silva	Athletics	Men's pole vault	28 July
1st place, gold medalist(s)	Vicente de Lima; Rafael Ribeiro; Basílio de Moraes; Sandro Viana	Athletics	Men's 4 × 100 metres relay	28 July
1st place, gold medalist(s)	Brazil men's national volleyball team	Volleyball	Men's tournament	28 July
1st place, gold medalist(s)	Franck de Almeida	Athletics	Men's marathon	29 July
1st place, gold medalist(s)	Brazil men's national basketball team	Basketball	Men's tournament	29 July
1st place, gold medalist(s)	Flávio Saretta	Tennis	Men's singles	29 July
2nd place, silver medalist(s)	Poliana Okimoto	Swimming	Women's marathon 10 kilometres	14 July
2nd place, silver medalist(s)	Rubens Valeriano	Cycling	Men's cross-country	14 July
2nd place, silver medalist(s)	Luis Anjos; Diego Hypólito; Danilo Nogueira; Mosiah Rodrigues; Victor Rosa; Adan Santos	Gymnastics	Men's artistic team all-around	14 July
2nd place, silver medalist(s)	Márcio Wenceslau	Taekwondo	Men's 58 kg	14 July
2nd place, silver medalist(s)	Jade Barbosa; Khiuani Dias; Daniele Hypólito; Ana Cláudia Silva; Daiane dos Santos; Lais Souza	Gymnastics	Women's artistic team all-around	14 July
2nd place, silver medalist(s)	Ana Flávia Sgobin	Cycling	Women's BMX	15 July
2nd place, silver medalist(s)	Júlio Almeida	Shooting	Men's 10-metre air pistol	17 July
2nd place, silver medalist(s)	Natália Falavigna	Taekwondo	Women's +67 kg	17 July
2nd place, silver medalist(s)	Gabriel Mangabeira	Swimming	Men's 100-metre butterfly	18 July
2nd place, silver medalist(s)	Renan Castro; Alexandre Ribas; Leandro Tozzo; Gibran Cunha; José Roberto Nascimento; Marcelus dos Santos; Anderson Nocetti; Allan Bitencourt; Nilton Alonço	Rowing	Men's eight	19 July
2nd place, silver medalist(s)	Fabíola Molina	Swimming	Women's 100-metre backstroke	19 July
2nd place, silver medalist(s)	João Schlittler	Judo	Men's +100 kg	19 July
2nd place, silver medalist(s)	Brazil women's national volleyball team	Volleyball	Women's tournament	19 July
2nd place, silver medalist(s)	Mayra Aguiar	Judo	Women´s 70 kg	20 July
2nd place, silver medalist(s)	Henrique Barbosa	Swimming	Men's 200-metre breaststroke	21 July
2nd place, silver medalist(s)	Danielli Yuri	Judo	Women´s 63 kg	21 July
2nd place, silver medalist(s)	Daniela Polzin	Judo	Women´s 48 kg	22 July
2nd place, silver medalist(s)	Leandro Guilheiro	Judo	Men's 73 kg	22 July
2nd place, silver medalist(s)	Érika Miranda	Judo	Women´s 52 kg	22 July
2nd place, silver medalist(s)	Flávia Delaroli	Swimming	Women's 100-metre freestyle	22 July
2nd place, silver medalist(s)	Márcia Narloch	Athletics	Women's marathon	22 July
2nd place, silver medalist(s)	Nicholas Santos	Swimming	Men's 50-metre freestyle	22 July
2nd place, silver medalist(s)	Thiago Pereira; Henrique Barbosa; Kaio Almeida; César Cielo	Swimming	Men's 4 × 100-metre medley relay	22 July
2nd place, silver medalist(s)	Rodrigo Hermes; Fábio Rezende	Bowling	Men's doubles	24 July
2nd place, silver medalist(s)	Brazil women's national basketball team	Basketball	Women's tournament	24 July
2nd place, silver medalist(s)	Carlos Lourenço	Karate	Men's 65 kg	25 July
2nd place, silver medalist(s)	Luiz Fernandes	Wrestling	Men's Greco-Roman 96 kg	25 July
2nd place, silver medalist(s)	Keila Costa	Athletics	Women's long jump	25 July
2nd place, silver medalist(s)	César Castro	Diving	Men's 3-metre springboard	26 July
2nd place, silver medalist(s)	Valéria Kumizaki	Karate	Women's 53 kg	26 July
2nd place, silver medalist(s)	Brazil men's national water polo team	Water polo	Men's tournament	26 July
2nd place, silver medalist(s)	Sebastian Cuattrin	Canoeing	Men's K-1 1000 metres	27 July
2nd place, silver medalist(s)	Vilson Nascimento; Wladimir Moreno	Canoeing	Men's C-2 1000 metres	27 July
2nd place, silver medalist(s)	Éverton Lopes	Boxing	Men's 60 kg	27 July
2nd place, silver medalist(s)	Keila Costa	Athletics	Women's triple jump	27 July
2nd place, silver medalist(s)	Marílson Gomes dos Santos	Athletics	Men's 10,000 metres	27 July
2nd place, silver medalist(s)	Robert Scheidt	Sailing	Men's Laser class	28 July
2nd place, silver medalist(s)	Patrícia Castro	Sailing	Women's sailboard	28 July
2nd place, silver medalist(s)	Kléberson Davide	Athletics	Men's 800 metres	28 July
2nd place, silver medalist(s)	Rodrigo Pessoa	Equestrian	Individual jumping	29 July
3rd place, bronze medalist(s)	Allan do Carmo	Swimming	Men's marathon 10 kilometres	14 July
3rd place, bronze medalist(s)	João Souza	Fencing	Men's foil	14 July
3rd place, bronze medalist(s)	Juraci Moreira	Triathlon	Men´s	15 July
3rd place, bronze medalist(s)	Clemilda Fernandes	Cycling	Women's road time trial	15 July
3rd place, bronze medalist(s)	Rogério Clementino; Renata Costa; Luiza Almeida	Equestrian	Team dressage	15 July
3rd place, bronze medalist(s)	Marcelus dos Santos	Rowing	Men's single sculls	17 July
3rd place, bronze medalist(s)	Anderson Nocetti; Allan Bitencourt	Rowing	Men's single sculls	17 July
3rd place, bronze medalist(s)	Guilherme Kumasaka; Guilherme Pardo	Badminton	Men's Doubles	17 July
3rd place, bronze medalist(s)	Lais Souza	Gymnastics	Women's vault	17 July
3rd place, bronze medalist(s)	Leonardo Gomes	Taekwondo	Men's +80 kg	17 July
3rd place, bronze medalist(s)	Lais Souza	Gymnastics	Women's uneven bars	17 July
3rd place, bronze medalist(s)	Daniele Hypólito	Gymnastics	Women's balance beam	17 July
3rd place, bronze medalist(s)	Jade Barbosa	Gymnastics	Women's floor	17 July
3rd place, bronze medalist(s)	Clarisse Menezes	Fencing	Women´s epée	17 July
3rd place, bronze medalist(s)	Danilo Nogueira	Gymnastics	Men's horizontal bar	17 July
3rd place, bronze medalist(s)	Flávia Delaroli	Swimming	Women's 50-metre freestyle	18 July
3rd place, bronze medalist(s)	Gabriella Silva	Swimming	Women's 100-metre butterfly	18 July
3rd place, bronze medalist(s)	Armando Negreiros	Swimming	Men's 400-metre freestyle	18 July
3rd place, bronze medalist(s)	Tatiana Lemos; Monique Ferreira; Manuella Lyrio; Paula Baracho	Swimming	Women's 4 × 200-metre freestyle relay	18 July
3rd place, bronze medalist(s)	Luciano Barbosa; Rafael Alarçón; Ronivaldo Conceição	Squash	Men's team	18 July
3rd place, bronze medalist(s)	Renzo Agresta	Fencing	Men's sabre	18 July
3rd place, bronze medalist(s)	Fernando Cardoso	Shooting	Men's 25-metre rapid fire pistol	19 July
3rd place, bronze medalist(s)	Lucas Salatta	Swimming	Men's 200-metre backstroke	19 July
3rd place, bronze medalist(s)	Priscilla Marques	Judo	Women´s +78 kg	19 July
3rd place, bronze medalist(s)	Monique Ferreira	Swimming	Women's 200-metre freestyle	20 July
3rd place, bronze medalist(s)	Luciano Corrêa	Judo	Men's 100 kg	20 July
3rd place, bronze medalist(s)	Daiene Dias	Swimming	Women's 200-metre butterfly	21 July
3rd place, bronze medalist(s)	Luciano Pagliarini	Cycling	Men's road race	21 July
3rd place, bronze medalist(s)	Sirlene Pinho	Athletics	Women's marathon	22 July
3rd place, bronze medalist(s)	Thiago Pereira	Swimming	Men's 100-metre backstroke	22 July
3rd place, bronze medalist(s)	Alexandre Lee	Judo	Men's 60 kg	22 July
3rd place, bronze medalist(s)	André Paro; Carlos Paro; Renan Guerreiro; Fabrício Salgado	Equestrian	Team eventing	22 July
3rd place, bronze medalist(s)	Joana Cortez; Teliana Pereira	Tennis	Women's doubles	22 July
3rd place, bronze medalist(s)	Juliana Almeida	Roller sports	Women's free skating	22 July
3rd place, bronze medalist(s)	Marílson Gomes dos Santos	Athletics	Men's 5000 metres	23 July
3rd place, bronze medalist(s)	Lucélia Peres	Athletics	Women's 10,000 metres	23 July
3rd place, bronze medalist(s)	Elisângela Adriano	Athletics	Women's discus throw	23 July
3rd place, bronze medalist(s)	James Pereira	Boxing	Men's 54 kg	24 July
3rd place, bronze medalist(s)	Carlos Chinin	Athletics	Men's decathlon	24 July
3rd place, bronze medalist(s)	Felipe Macedo	Wrestling	Men's Greco-Roman 74 kg	25 July
3rd place, bronze medalist(s)	Juliana Veloso	Diving	Women's 10-metre platform	25 July
3rd place, bronze medalist(s)	Davi Souza	Boxing	Men's 57 kg	25 July
3rd place, bronze medalist(s)	Myke Carvalho	Boxing	Men's 64 kg	25 July
3rd place, bronze medalist(s)	Glaucélio Abreu	Boxing	Men's 75 kg	25 July
3rd place, bronze medalist(s)	Rafael Lima	Boxing	Men's 91 kg	25 July
3rd place, bronze medalist(s)	Antônio Rogério Nogueira	Boxing	Men's +91 kg	25 July
3rd place, bronze medalist(s)	Lucimara da Silva	Athletics	Women's heptathlon	25 July
3rd place, bronze medalist(s)	Nelson Sardenberg	Karate	Men's 80 kg	26 July
3rd place, bronze medalist(s)	Rosângela Conceição	Wrestling	Women's freestyle 72 kg	26 July
3rd place, bronze medalist(s)	Lara Teixeira; Caroline Hildebrandt	Synchronized swimming	Women's duet	27 July
3rd place, bronze medalist(s)	Douglas Brose	Karate	Men's 60 kg	27 July
3rd place, bronze medalist(s)	Vinicius Souza	Karate	Men's 70 kg	27 July
3rd place, bronze medalist(s)	Edson Isaias	Canoeing	Men's K-1 500 metres	28 July
3rd place, bronze medalist(s)	Nivalter Santos	Canoeing	Men's C-1 500 metres	28 July
3rd place, bronze medalist(s)	Vilson Nascimento; Wladimir Moreno	Canoeing	Men's C-2 500 metres	28 July
3rd place, bronze medalist(s)	Giovanna Matheus	Gymnastics	Women's trampoline	28 July
3rd place, bronze medalist(s)	Beatriz Feres; Branca Feres; Lara Teixeira; Caroline Hildebrandt; Nayara Figueira; Michelle Frota; Glaucia Souza; Giovana Stephan; Pamela Nogueira	Synchronized swimming	Women's team	28 July
3rd place, bronze medalist(s)	Claudio Biekarck; Gunnar Ficker; Marcelo Silva	Sailing	Lightning class	28 July
3rd place, bronze medalist(s)	Adriana Kostiw	Sailing	Women's Laser Radial class	28 July
3rd place, bronze medalist(s)	Ana Paula Scheffer	Gymnastics	Women's rhythmic individual hoop	28 July
3rd place, bronze medalist(s)	Thiago Monteiro	Table tennis	Men's singles	28 July
3rd place, bronze medalist(s)	Hugo Hoyama	Table tennis	Men's singles	28 July
3rd place, bronze medalist(s)	Fabiano Peçanha	Athletics	Men's 800 metres	28 July
3rd place, bronze medalist(s)	Zenaide Vieira	Athletics	Women's 3000 metres steeplechase	28 July
3rd place, bronze medalist(s)	Alexon Maximiano	Athletics	Men's javelin throw	28 July

**Medals by sport**
**Sport**	1st place, gold medalist(s)	2nd place, silver medalist(s)	3rd place, bronze medalist(s)	Total
Swimming	10	7	9	26
Athletics	9	5	9	23
Gymnastics	7	2	7	16
Judo	4	6	3	13
Sailing	3	2	2	7
Karate	2	2	3	7
Handball	2	0	0	2
Beach volleyball	2	0	0	2
Canoeing	1	2	3	6
Taekwondo	1	2	1	4
Boxing	1	1	6	8
Equestrian	1	1	2	4
Volleyball	1	1	0	2
Basketball	1	1	0	2
Table tennis	1	0	2	3
Roller sports	1	0	1	2
Tennis	1	0	1	2
Modern pentathlon	1	0	0	1
Water skiing	1	0	0	1
Football	1	0	0	1
Futsal	1	0	0	1
Cycling	0	2	2	4
Rowing	0	1	2	3
Wrestling	0	1	2	3
Shooting	0	1	1	2
Diving	0	1	1	2
Bowling	0	1	0	1
Water polo	0	1	0	1
Fencing	0	0	3	3
Synchronized swimming	0	0	2	2
Badminton	0	0	1	1
Triathlon	0	0	1	1
Squash	0	0	1	1
**Total**	**52**	**40**	**65**	157

**Medals by day**
**Day**	1st place, gold medalist(s)	2nd place, silver medalist(s)	3rd place, bronze medalist(s)	**Total**
14 July	0	5	2	7
15 July	1	1	3	5
16 July	0	0	0	0
17 July	6	2	10	18
18 July	2	1	6	9
19 July	1	4	3	8
20 July	5	1	2	8
21 July	5	2	2	9
22 July	4	7	6	17
23 July	3	0	3	6
24 July	1	2	2	5
25 July	4	3	8	15
26 July	1	3	2	6
27 July	5	5	3	13
28 July	11	3	13	27
29 July	3	1	0	4
**Total**	**52**	**40**	**65**	**157**

**Medals by gender**
**Gender**	1st place, gold medalist(s)	2nd place, silver medalist(s)	3rd place, bronze medalist(s)	**Total**
Male	37	23	38	98
Female	15	17	26	58
Mixed	0	0	1	1
**Total**	**52**	**40**	**65**	**157**

== Results by event ==
=== Aquatics ===
==== Diving ====
Female

- Evelyn Winkler
- Juliana Veloso
- Milena Canto Sae
- Tammy Galera Takagi

Male

- Cassius Duran
- César Castro
- Hugo Parisi
- Ubirajara Barbosa

==== Open water swimming ====
4 athletes (2 female and 2 male)

Female

- Poliana Okimoto
- Ana Marcela Cunha

Male

- Allan do Carmo
- Marcelo Romanello

==== Swimming ====
52 athletes (25 female and 26 male)

Female

- Daiene Dias
- Fabíola Molina
- Fernanda Alvarenga
- Flávia Delaroli
- Gabriella Silva
- Joanna Maranhão
- Larissa Cieslak
- Lilian Cerroni
- Manuella Lyrio
- Mariana Katsuno
- Michelle Lenhardt
- Monique Ferreira
- Nayara Ribeiro
- Paula Baracho
- Poliana Okimoto
- Tatiana Barbosa
- Tatiane Sakemi
- Veruska Clednev

Male

- Armando Negreiros
- César Cielo
- Diogo Yabe
- Eduardo Deboni
- Felipe May Araújo
- Felipe Lima
- Fernando Silva
- Gabriel Mangabeira
- Henrique Barbosa
- Kaio de Almeida
- Leonardo Guedes
- Lucas Salatta
- Luiz Arapiraca
- Nicolas Oliveira
- Nicholas Santos
- Rodrigo Castro
- Thiago Pereira

==== Synchronised swimming ====
9 female athletes

- Beatriz Feres
- Branca Feres
- Caroline Hildebrant
- Giovana Stephan
- Glaucia Souza
- Lara Teixeira
- Michelle Frota
- Nayara Figueira
- Pamela Nogueira

==== Water polo ====
26 athletes (13 female, 13 male)

Female

- Ana Vasconcelos
- Andréa Henriques
- Amanda Oliveira
- Camila Pedrosa
- Ciça Canetti
- Fernanda Lissoni
- Flávia Fernandes
- Luíza Carvalho
- Maria Barbara Amaro
- Marina Canetti
- Manuela Canetti
- Melina Teno
- Tess Oliveira

Male

- André Cordeiro
- André Raposo
- Bruno Nolasco
- Daniel Mameri
- Erik Seegerer
- Felipe Franco
- Gabriel Reis
- Leandro Ruiz Machado
- Lucas Vita
- Luís Santos
- Roberto Seabra
- Rodrigo dos Santos
- Vicente Henriques

=== Archery ===
6 athletes (3 female and 3 male)

Women

- Sarah Nikitin
- Fátima Rocha
- Petra Ruocco

Men

- Marcos Bortoloto
- Leonardo Carvalho
- Fabio Emilio

=== Athletics ===
83 athletes (39 female and 44 male)

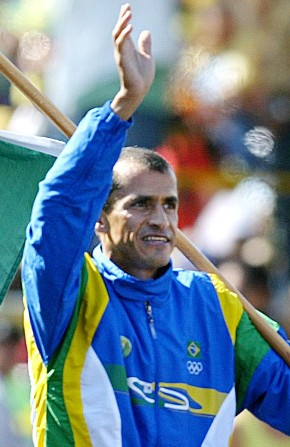
Vanderlei Cordeiro de Lima, carrying the Brazilian Flag.

Female

- Márcia Narloch (Running)
- Sirlene Pinho (Running)

Male

- Franck de Almeida (Running)
- Vanderlei Cordeiro de Lima (Running)
- Mário José dos Santos Júnior (Athletic 50 km)
- Cláudio Richardson dos Santos (Athletic 50 km)

=== Badminton ===
8 athletes (4 female and 4 male)

Female

- Fabiana Silva (singles)
- Mariana Arimori (singles)
- Paula Beatriz Pereira (doubles)
- Thayse Cruz (doubles)

Male

- Guilherme Pardo (singles and doubles)
- Guilherme Kumasaka (doubles)
- Lucas Araújo (singles and doubles)
- Paulo Scala (simples and doubles)

=== Baseball ===
20 male athletes

Pitchers

- Marcelo Kaneo Arai (Dourados / Dourados – MS)
- Rodrigo Watanabe Miyamoto (Yamaha – JAP)
- Fernando Oda (Coopercotia / São Paulo – SP)
- Gustavo Yukio Ogassawara (Nittadai University – JAP)
- Kléber Ojima (Mogi das Cruzes / Mogi das Cruzes – SP)
- Gilmar Henrique Pereira (Philadelphia Phillies – USA)
- Marcio Sakane (Dragons / Itapecerica da Serra – SP)
- Claudio Kenji Yamada (Atibaia / Atibaia – SP)

Catchers

- Rafael Motooka de Oliveira (Guarulhos / Guarulhos – SP)
- Ricardo Hideki Shimanoe (São Paulo / São Paulo – SP)

Infielders

- Marcelo Okuyama (São Paulo / São Paulo – SP)
- Ronaldo Hidemi Ono (Nippon Blue Jays / Arujá – SP)
- Reinaldo Tsuguio Sato (Yamaha – JAP)
- Renan Issamu Sato (Mitsubishi – JAP)
- Evaldo Yamaoka (Dragons / Itapecerica da Serra – SP)

Outfielders

- Tiago Campos de Magalhães (Yamaha – JAP)
- Celso Takashi Nakano (São Paulo / São Paulo – SP)
- Paulo Roberto Orlando (Chicago White Sox – USA)
- Anderson Gomes dos Santos (Chicago White Sox – USA)
- Julio Shinji Takahashi (Nippon Blue Jays / Arujá – SP)

=== Basketball ===
==== Men's team competition ====
- Team Roster
  - Marcelo Machado
  - Welington dos Santos
  - Murilo da Rosa
  - Marcus Reis
  - Marcelo Huertas
  - Valter Silva
  - Alex García
  - Guilherme Teichmann
  - Caio Torres
  - João Paulo Batista
  - Marcus Vinicius
  - Paulo Prestes
- Head coach: Aluisio Ferrerira

==== Women's team competition ====
- Team Roster
  - Janeth Arcain
  - Graziane Coelho
  - Tatiana Conceição
  - Jucimara Dantas ("Mamá")
  - Patricia Ferreira ("Chuca")
  - Micaela Jacinto
  - Palmira Marçal
  - Isis Nascimento
  - Adriana Moisés Pinto
  - Karen Rocha
  - Kelly Santos
  - Soeli Zakrzeski ("Êga")

=== Bowling ===
4 athletes (2 female and 2 male)

Female

- Jacqueline Costa
- Roseli Santos

Male

- Fabio Rezende
- Rodrigo Hermes

=== Boxing ===
11 male athletes

- To 48 kg: Paulo Carvalho
- To 51 kg: Robenilson Vieira
- To 54 kg: James Dean Pereira
- to 57 kg: Davi Souza
- To 60 kg: Éverton Lopes
- To 64 kg: Myke Carvalho
- To 69 kg: Pedro Lima
- To 75 kg: Glaucelio Abreu
- To 81 kg: Washington Silva
- To 91 kg: Rafael Lima
- Over 91 kg: Rogério Nogueira

=== Canoeing ===
14 athletes (5 female and 9 male) Female

- Bruna Gama (K1 e K4)
- Naiane Pereira (K2 e K4)
- Ariela Pinto (K2 e K4)
- Daniela Alvarez (K4)
- Mayara Cardoso (reserve)

Male

- Sebástian Cuattrin (K4 1000m e K2 1000m)
- Guto Campos (K4 1000m e K2 500m)
- Roberto Mahler (K4 1000m e K2 500m)
- Edson Isaías da Silva (K4 1000m e K1 500m)
- Jonathan Maia (K2 1000m)
- Givago Ribeiro (K2 1000m)
- Nivalter Santos de Jesus (C1 1000m e C1 500m)
- Vladimir Moreno (C2 1000m e C2 500m)
- Vilson Conceição (C2 1000m e C2 500m)

=== Cycling ===
23 athletes (6 female and 17 male)

Male

- Marcos Novello (road and track)
- Marcos Vinícius Correia de Alcântra (track)
- Davi Romeo (track)
- Fernando Firmino (track)
- Magno Nazaret (track)
- Roberson Figueiredo (track)
- Hernandes Cuadri (track)
- Rodrigo Brito (track)

==== BMX ====
Female

- Ana Flavia Sgobin
- Luciana Hirama

Male

- Hudson Peixoto
- Mauro Aquino

==== Mountain bike ====
Female

- Jaqueline Mourão

Male

- Edivando Cruz
- Ricardo Pscheidt

==== Road ====
Female

- Clemilda Fernandes
- Uênia Fernandes
- Janildes Fernandes

Male

- Luciano Pagliarini
- Rafael Andriato
- Renato Seabra
- Otavio Bulgarelli
- Pedro Nicacio
- Marcos Novello (also competed in track cycling)

==== Track ====
Male

- Marcos Novello (also competed in road cycling)
- Marcos Vinícius Correia de Alcântra
- Davi Romeo
- Fernando Firmino
- Magno Nazaret
- Roberson Figueiredo
- Hernandes Cuadri
- Rodrigo Brito

=== Equestrian ===
==== Dressage ====
Rider / Horse

- Rogerio Clementino / Nilo Vo
- Renata Costa / Monty
- Luiza Almeida / Samba

==== Eventing ====
Rider / Horse

- Fabricio Salgado / Butterfly
- Carlos Paro / Political Mandate
- Renan Guerreiro / Rodizio AA
- Andre Paro / Land Heir
- Saulo Tristao / Totsie
- Serguei Fofanoff / Ekus TW

==== Show jumping ====
Rider / Horse

- Bernardo Alves / Chupa Chup 2
- Pedro Veniss / Un Blancs De Blanc
- Cesar Almeida / Singular Joter II
- Rodrigo Pessoa / Rufus
- Pia Aragão
- Renata Rabello
- Jorge Rocha (dressage)

==== Show Jumping ====
5 athletes

- Bernardo Alves
- Rodrigo Pessoa
- César Almeida

=== Fencing ===
16 athletes (8 female and 8 male)

Female

- Camila Rodrigues
- Clarisse Menezes

Male

- Athos Schwantes
- Heitor Shimbo
- Ivan Schwantes
- João Souza
- Marcos Cardoso
- Rhaoni Ruckheim
- Renzo Agresta

=== Field hockey ===
32 athletes (16 female and 16 mas)

=== Football ===
36 athletes (18 female and 18 male)

Male

- Marcelo – Flamengo
- Renan – Atlético Mineiro
- Átila – Corinthians
- Michel – Figueirense
- Foster – Internacional
- Lucas – Flamengo
- Rafael – Fluminense
- Fabio – Fluminense
- Bruno – Grêmio
- Fellipe – Botafogo
- Bernardo – Cruzeiro
- Tales – Internacional
- Lulinha – Corinthians
- Tiago – Grêmio
- Carlos – Vasco
- Júnior – Botafogo
- Maicon – Fluminense
- Alex – Vasco

=== Futsal ===
12 athletes

=== Gymnastics ===
==== Trampoline ====
3 athletes (2 female and 1 male)

Female

- Giovanna Venetiglio Matheus

=== Handball ===
30 athletes (15 female and 15 male)

=== Judo ===
14 athletes (7 female and 7 male)

Female

- Ligeiros (Up to 48 kg): Daniela Polzin
- Meio-leves (to 52 kg): Érika Miranda
- Leves (to 57 kg): Danielle Zangrando
- Meio-médios (to 63 kg): Daniele Yuri
- Médios (to 70 kg): Mayra Aguiar
- Meio-pesados (to 78 kg): Edinanci Silva
- Pesados (More than 78 kg): Priscila Marques

Male

- Ligeiros (to 60 kg): Alexandre Lee
- Meio-leves (to 66 kg): João Derly
- Leves (to 73 kg): Leandro Guilheiro
- Meio-médios (to 81 kg): Flávio Canto
- Médios (to 90 kg): Tiago Camilo
- Meio-pesados (to 100 kg): Luciano Corrêa
- Pesados (more than 100 kg): João Gabriel Schilliter

=== Karate ===
9 athletes (3 female and 6 male) Female

- Dafani Figueiredo (To 60 kg)
- Lucélia Peres de Carvalho (More de 60 kg)
- Valéria Kumizaki (To 53 kg)

Male

- Caio Duprat (até 75 kg)
- Carlos Lourenço (até 65 kg)
- Douglas Brose (até 60 kg)
- Juarez Santos (acima 80 kg)
- Nelson Sardenberg (até 80 kg)
- Vinicius Souza (até 70 kg)

=== Modern pentathlon ===
Four athletes (two female and two male)

- Wagner Romão
- Daniel Santos
- Yane Marques
- Larissa Lellys

=== Rowing ===
33 athletes (11 female and 22 male)

- Alexandre Fernandes Ribas (TBD)
- Alexandre Monteiro Dias Fernandes Fernandez (oito com)
- Alexis Árias Mestre (TBD)
- Allan Scaravaglioni Bittencourt (dois sem e oito com)
- Amanda da Costa Duarte (dois sem)
- Anderson Nocetti (dois sem e oito com)
- Camila de Carvalho e Carvalho (skiff duplo peso leve)
- Caroline Farré Beloni (dois sem)
- Célio Dias Amorim (TBD)
- Deborah Amorim (skiff duplo peso leve)
- Fabiana Beltrame (skiff quádruplo)
- Gibran Vieira da Cunha (quatro sem e oito com)
- Gustavo Villela dos Santos (TBD)
- Henrique Vieira Motta (TBD)
- Jairo Natanael Fröhlich Klug (TBD)
- João Hildebrando Borges Jr. (TBD)
- João Roberto Lopes Pallassão (TBD)
- João Soares Jr. (TBD)
- José Carlos Gonçalves Sobral Jr. (skiff duplo peso leve)
- José Roberto do Nascimento Jr. (TBD)
- José Rodrigo Rangel (TBD)
- Kissya Cataldo da Costa (skiff quádruplo)
- Leandro Francisco Tozzo (quatro sem e oito com)
- Leandro Loureiro Franco Ferreira (quatro sem peso leve)
- Luciana Granato (skiff duplo peso leve)
- Marcelus Marcili dos Santos Silva (TBD)
- Marco Moreira Martins (TBD)
- Mônica Anversa Fuchs (skiff quádruplo)
- Nilton Silva Alonço (oito com)
- Renan Koplewski de Castro (TBD)
- Renata Görgen (skiff quádruplo)
- Ronaldo da Gama Vargas (TBD)
- Thiago Almeida (TBD)
- Thiago Gomes (double skiff peso leve)

=== Sailing ===
16 athletes (2 female and 14 male) Female

- Adriana Kostiw
- Patrícia Castro

Male

- Alexandre Paradeda
- Alexandre Saldanha
- Bernardo Arndt
- Bernardo Low-Beer
- Bruno Oliveira
- Cláudio Biekarck
- Daniel Santiago
- Gunnar Ficker
- João Carlos Jordão
- Marcelo Silva
- Maurício Santa Cruz
- Pedro Tinoco
- Ricardo Winicki
- Robert Scheidt

=== Shooting ===
29 athletes (11 female and 18 male)

- Aliseu Farias (air carbine and carbine 3x40)
- Ana Luiza Mello (sport pistol)
- Cecília Frej (air pistol)
- Cristina Badaró (carabina de ar)
- Daniela Carraro (skeet)
- Emerson Duarte (tiro rápido)
- Fábio Coelho (air carbine and carbine 3x40)
- Fernando Cardoso Jr. (tiro rápido)
- Filipe Fuzaro (fossa doublé)
- Janice Teixeira (fossa olimpic)
- Júlio Almeida (air pistol)
- Luiz Bork (carbine deitado)
- Luiz Carlos Graça (fossa doublé)
- Rachel da Silveira (sport pistol)
- Renata Castro (air pistol)
- Renato Araújo Portela (skeet)
- Roberto Schmits (fossa olimpic)
- Rodrigo Bastos (fossa olimpic)
- Samuel Leandro Lopes (carbine deitado)
- Simone Cezar da Rocha (air carbine and carbine 3x20)
- Stenio Yamamoto (pistol livre and air pistol)
- Vladimir da Silveira (pistol livre)
- Wilson Zocolote (skeet)

=== Softball ===
- Cinthia Kudo
- Elayne Simon
- Nilze Higa
- Mirian Yuki Someya

Receptor

- Márcia Mizushima
- Vivian Morimoto

'Defense

- Tathiane Misawa
- Simone Miyahira
- Kátia Ayumi Abe
- Martha Murazawa
- Camila Ariki
- Juliana Shibata
- Simone Suetsugu
- Mariana Sayuri Abe
- Patrícia Sugino
- Maria Eliza Tanaka
- Cynthia Takahashi

=== Squash ===
6 athletes (3 female and 3 male)

- Luciano Barbosa
- Rafael Alarçón
- Ronivaldo Conceição
- Karen Redfern
- Mariana Pontalti
- Thaisa Serafini

=== Table tennis ===
8 athletes (4 female and 4 male)

Female

- Lígia Silva
- Mariany Nonaka
- Karin Sako
- Carina Murashige (reserve)

Male

- Hugo Hoyama
- Thiago Monteiro
- Gustavo Tsuboi
- Cazuo Matsumoto (reserve)

=== Taekwondo ===
8 athletes (4 female and 4 male)

- Natália Falavigna (Heavyweight – +67 kg)
- Valdirene Gonçalves (Flyweight – 49 kg)
- Debora Nunes Lightweight – 57 kg)
- Érica Ferreira Middleweight – 67 kg)
- Diogo Silva (Lightweight – 68 kg)
- Márcio Wenceslau (Flyweight – 58 kg)
- Carlos Isidoro (Middleweight – 80 kg)
- Leonardo Gomes (Heavyweight – +80 kg)

=== Tennis ===
8 athletes (4 female and 4 male)

- Jenifer Widjaja
- Teliana Pereira

=== Triathlon ===
==== Men's competition ====
- Juraci Moreira
  - 1:52:54.79 – Bronze Medal
- Virgílio de Castilho
  - 1:55:17.24 – 13th place
- Antônio Marcos da Silva
  - 2:06:50.94 – 29th place

==== Women's competition ====
- Mariana Ohata
  - 2:00:51.28 – 5th place
- Carla Moreno
  - 2:02:03.29 – 9th place
- Sandra Soldan
  - 2:06:35.99 – 19th place

=== Volleyball ===
24 athletes (12 female and 12 male)

==== Beach volleyball ====
4 athletes (2 female and 2 male)

Female

- Larissa
- Juliana

Male

- Ricardo
- Emanuel

=== Water skiing ===
- Juliana Negrão
- Felipe Neves
- Fernando Neves

Wakeboard Masculino

- Marcelo Giardi
- Mário Manzolli

=== Wrestling ===
11 athletes (4 female and 7 male)

- Adrian Jaoude (−84 kg, estilo livre)
- Antoine Jaoude (−96 kg, estilo livre)
- Caroline De Lazzer (−63 kg, estilo livre)
- Diego Rodrigues (−120 kg, estilo livre)
- Fábio Cunha (−55 kg, estilo grego-romano)
- Felipe Macedo (−74 kg, estilo grego-romano)
- Iuri Cunha (−60 kg, estilo livre)
- Joice Silva (−55 kg, estilo livre)
- Luis Fernandes (−96 kg, estilo grego-romano)
- Marcelo Gomes "Zulu" (−84 kg, estilo grego-romano)
- Raoni Barcelos (−66 kg, estilo livre)
- Renato Migliaccio (−66 kg estilo greco-romano)
- Renato Roma (−70 kg, estilo livre)
- Rodrigo Artilheiro (−120 kg, estilo grego-romano)
- Rosangela Conceição (−72 kg, estilo livre)
- Suzana Almeida (−48 kg, estilo livre)
- Vinicius Pedrosa (−55 kg, estilo livre)
- Waldeci Silva (−60 kg, estilo livre)
