= Sailing at the 2011 Pan American Games – Lightning =

Lightning Class at the 2011 Pan American Games
- Venue: Vallarta Yacht Club
- Dates: October 17 - October 23
- Competitors: 21 from 7 nations

Medalists
Gold medal	Alberto González; Diego Gonzalez; Cristian Herman	Chile
Silver medal	Jody Lutz; Derek Gauger; Jay Lutz	United States
Bronze medal	Claudio Biekarck; Marcelo da Silva; Gunnar Ficker	Brazil

The Lightning class competition of the sailing events at the 2011 Pan American Games in Guadalajara were held from October 17 to October 23 at the Vallarta Yacht Club in Puerto Vallarta. The defending champion was the boat from Chile.

Points were assigned based on the finishing position in each race (1 for first, 2 for second, etc.). The points were totaled from the top 9 results of the first 10 races, with lower totals being better. If a sailor was disqualified or did not complete the race, 8 points were assigned for that race (as there were 7 sailors in this competition). The top 5 sailors at that point competed in the final race, with placings counting double for final score. The sailor with the lowest total score won.

== Schedule ==
All times are Central Standard Time (UTC-6).

Date	Time	Round
October 17, 2011	13:00	1 and 2 races
October 18, 2011	13:00	3 and 4 races
October 19, 2011	13:00	5 and 6 races
October 21, 2011	13:00	7 and 8 races
October 22, 2011	13:00	9 and 10 races
October 23, 2011	13:18	Medal race

== Results ==
Race M is the medal race in which only the top 5 competitors took part. Each boat can drop its lowest result provided that all ten races are completed. If less than ten races are completed all races will count. Boats cannot drop their result in the medal race.

Rank	Athlete	Race											Total Points	Net Points
Rank	Athlete	1	2	3	4	5	6	7	8	9	10	M	Total Points	Net Points
1st place, gold medalist(s)	Chile; Alberto González; Diego Gonzalez; Cristian Herman	4	2	4	1	(6)	1	2	1	3	2	6	32	26
2nd place, silver medalist(s)	United States; Jody Lutz; Derek Gauger; Jay Lutz	1	3	1	(6)	4	2	4	2	2	3	10	38	32
3rd place, bronze medalist(s)	Brazil; Claudio Biekarck; Marcelo da Silva; Gunnar Ficker	3	1	(7)	2	2	3	5	3	6	1	8	41	34
4	Canada; Peter Hall; Megan Armitage; Chantal Leger	2	6	6	4	3	(7)	3	4	4	4	2	45	38
5	Ecuador; Juan Miguel Santos; Sebastian Herrera; Juan Andres Santos	5	4	3	(7)	5	6	1	5	1	5	4	46	39
6	Argentina; Juan Cloos; Carlos de Mare; Julian de Mare Villar	6	5	2	3	1	4	6	(7)	5	6	–	45	38
7	Mexico; Aroldo de Rienzo; Gerrit Gentry; Kenneth Porter	(7)	7	5	5	7	5	7	6	7	7	–	63	56
