= Lightning World Championship =

Open Sailing World Championship for Lightning Class

The Lightning World Championship is a bi-annual international sailing regatta for lightning (dinghy). It is organized by the host club on behalf of the International Lightning Class Association and recognized by World Sailing, the sport's IOC-recognized governing body. The class gained class status in November 1962 from World Sailing, so its first Worlds were in 1963, although an International Regatta was held in 1961.

== Editions ==
Host cities of the World Championship

| Edition | | | Host | | | Boats | Participant | | | Ref |
| No. | Date | Year | Host club | Location | Nat. | Boats | Sailor | Nat. | Cont. | Ref |
|---|---|---|---|---|---|---|---|---|---|---|
| 1 | | 1963 | Club de Regatas Lima | Lima | Peru | 35 | 105 | 8 | 3 | |
| 2 | 9-19 Sept | 1965 | Circolo Canottiere Napoli | Naples | Italy | 43 | 129 | 12 | 4 | |
| 3 | | 1967 | Royal Canadian Yacht Club | Toronto | Canada | 37 | 0 | 8 | 3 | |
| 4 | | 1969 | Yacht Club Olivos | Olivos, Buenos Aires | Argentina | 43 | 129 | 12 | 3 | |
| 5 | | 1971 | Merenkavijat Yacht Club | Helsinki | Finland | 40 | 121 | 10 | 3 | |
| 6 | | 1973 | Buffalo Canoe Club | Fort Erie, Ontario | Canada | 39 | 117 | 8 | 3 | |
| 7 | | 1975 | Salinas Yacht Club | Salinas, Ecuador | Ecuador | 49 | 147 | 10 | 3 | |
| 8 | | 1977 | Yacht-Club Spiez | Spiez | Switzerland | 54 | 160 | 12 | 4 | |
| 9 | | 1979 | Rush Creek Yacht Club | Heath, Texas | United States | 52 | 156 | 11 | 3 | |
| 10 | | 1981 | Gran Hotel Pucon | Pucon | Chile | | | | | |
| 11 | | 1983 | Circola Velici | Napoletani | Italy | 41 | 123 | 8 | 3 | |
| 12 | | 1985 | Little Egg Harbor Yacht Club | Beach Haven, New Jersey | United States | 40 | 121 | 8 | 3 | |
| 13 | | 1987 | Club Naval Castillogrande | Cartagena | Colombia | 39 | 117 | 9 | 3 | |
| 14 | 2–7 July | 1989 | Yacht Racing Club of Athens / Piareaus Sailing Club | Athens | Greece | 45 | 135 | 8 | 3 | |
| 15 | | 1991 | Severn Sailing Association | Annapolis | United States | 39 | 117 | 8 | 3 | |
| 16 | | 1993 | | lhabela Island | Brazil | 42 | 126 | 7 | 3 | |
| 17 | 2–8 July | 1995 | Kuopion Pursiscura | Kuopio | Finland | 35 | 105 | 6 | 3 | |
| 18 | 8–13 June | 1997 | St Claire Yacht Club and Royal St. Lawrence Yacht Club | Montreal, Quebec | Canada | 58 | 175 | 9 | 3 | |
| 19 | 22-29 Nov | 1999 | Salinas Yacht Club | Salinas, Ecuador | Ecuador | 45 | 135 | 7 | 3 | |
| 20 | 20–24 July | 2001 | Circolo Velico Marsala | Marsala, Sicily | Italy | 44 | 132 | 9 | 3 | |
| 21 | 13-18 Apr | 2003 | Coral Reef Yacht Club & Biscayne Bay Yacht Club | Miami | United States | 60 | 180 | 11 | 3 | |
| 22 | 19-26 Nov | 2005 | Higuerillas Yacht Club | Higuerillas | Chile | 45 | 135 | 8 | 3 | |
| 23 | 21–27 July | 2007 | Yacht Club of Greece | Athens | Greece | 48 | 145 | 12 | 5 | |
| 24 | 11-29 Sept | 2009 | Mallets Bay Yacht Club | Colchester, Vermont | United States | 60 | 180 | 10 | 5 | |
| 25 | | 2011 | Clube Armacao de Buzios | Buzios, Rio de Janeiro | Brazil | 30 | 90 | 9 | 5 | |
| 26 | 6–14 June | 2013 | Club Velico Castiglionese | Castiglione del Lago | Italy | 46 | 139 | 10 | 5 | |
| 27 | 18–25 July | 2015 | Buffalo Canoe Club | Fort Erie, Ontario | Canada | 63 | 190 | 10 | 5 | |
| 28 | 21-25 Nov | 2017 | Salinas Yacht Club | Salinas, Ecuador | Ecuador | 56 | 168 | 12 | 5 | |
| 29 | 12–17 June | 2019 | Espoo Yacht Club | Espoo | Finland | 49 | 147 | 12 | 5 | |
| N/A | 13–22 May | 2021 | | Charleston | United States | Postponed due to COVID | | | | |
| 30 | 17–21 May | 2022 | Carolina Yacht Club | Charleston | United States | 50 | 150 | 8 | 4 | |
| 31 | 23-27 Nov | 2023 | Club Naval Santa Cruz de Castillogrande | Cartagena | Colombia | 40 | | 11+ | 4+ | |
| 32 | 16-21 Jun | 2025 | Yacht Club of Voula | Voula | Greece | 40 | 123 | 10 | 4 | |

== Medalists ==
| Games | Gold | Silver | Bronze | Ref. |
|---|---|---|---|---|
| 1963 | US 7811 Thomas Allen III (USA); Anne Allen (sailor) (USA); Bruce Goldsmith (USA) | US 8513 Bob Seidelmann (USA); John Walton (USA); Bob Bray (USA) | US 8390 Carl Eichenlaub (USA); Michael O'Bryan (USA); Stan Brander (USA) | |
| 1965 | US 9411 - ATOM II Thomas Allen III (USA); Anne Allen (sailor) (USA); Bruce Goldsmith (USA) | US 8529 - SHAZAM Alan Raffee (USA); Dennis Conner (USA); Carol Mclaughlin (USA) | US 9110 - HYPERTENSION David M. Peterson (USA); M.J. O'Meara (USA); J.W. Healy (USA) | |
| 1967 | US 10199 Dr Louis Pocharski (USA); UNKNOWN; UNKNOWN | 10411 Thomas Allen III (USA) | 8510 Bergantz USA | |
| 1969 | US 11367 - Snoopy Bruce Goldsmith (USA); Pamela Goldsmith (USA); Jim Dressel (USA) | 9390 - Cat James R Crane (USA); Robert B. Crane (USA); Robert Lansing (USA) | 11011 - Atom Thomas Allen III (USA); Anne Allen (sailor) (USA); John Schneider (USA) | |
| 1971 | US 11501 - Finesse William Shore (sailor) (USA); Bonnie Shore (USA); Robert Bone (USA) | US 11491 - Tickled Pink Jack Mueller Jnr. (USA); J. Mueller (USA); Nancy Mueller (USA) | US 11099 - Spook Louis Pocharski (USA); Janet Shore (USA); F. Healey Jnr. (USA) | |
| 1973 | US 12422 - Snoopy Bruce Goldsmith (USA); Pam Goldsmith (USA); David Peters (sailor) (USA) | US 12060 - Hang On Sloopy Jim Dressel; Nancy Dressel; Gary Cameron | US 10599 - Shoe Shine Baby Bob Seidelmann; Bill Clausen; Karen Huntsman | |
| 1975 | B 12414 Mario Buckup (BRA); Ralph Christian (BRA); Joaquim Feneberg (BRA) | US 10114 William Shore (sailor) (USA); Bonnie Shore (USA); Mark Bryant (sailor) (USA) | US 12422 Bruce Goldsmith (USA); Pam Goldsmith (USA); Bob Smither (USA) | |
| 1977 | 13111 Thomas Allen III (USA); Brenda Allen (USA); Tom Allen (USA) | 7495 Mario Buckup BRA; Joaquim Feneberg BRA; Ralph W. Christian | 11658 Jim Crane; Steve Nightingale; Eugene Peters | |
| 1979 | US 13226 Glenn Darden (USA); Kelly Gough (USA); Doug Shelton (USA) | US 13226 William A Shore (USA); Bonnie Shore (USA); Mark BRYANT (USA) | US 13333 Jim Crane (USA); Bill Crane (USA); Gene Peters (USA) | |
| 1981 | Walmor Gomez (BRA) UNKNOWN; UNKNOWN | Glenn Darden (USA) UNKNOWN; UNKNOWN | UNKNOWN UNKNOWN; UNKNOWN | |
| 1983 | US 11420 - Speedy Jay Lutz (USA); Dick Escalara (USA); Michael Healy (USA) | I 13706 Sergio Messina (ITA) Antonino Nizza (ITA) Pasquale Vitaggio (ITA) | BL 12489 Claudio Biekarck (BRA); Gunnar Ficker (BRA); Ralph Berger (BRA) | |
| 1985 | US 14021 - Eclipse William Shore (sailor) (USA); Karen Neri (USA); Betsy Gelenitis (USA) | BL 12812 - Flash Rider Mario Buckup (BRA); Michael Anthony Norris (BRA); Christina Maricke (BRA); Marttin Norris (BRA) | US 11739 - Speedy Again Jay Lutz (USA); Jody Lutz (USA); Dick Escalera (USA) | |
| 1987 Cartegena | X 11099 Manuel González Maz (CHI); Alberto Gonzalez (CHI); Rodrigo Zuazola (CHI) | KC 14057 Eddy Martin (CAN); Perry Owen (CAN); Jay Mann (CAN) | US 14175 William Shore (USA); Brad Read (USA); Steve Hayden (USA) | |
| 1989 | KC 13968; Peter Hall (CAN); Mark Osterman (CAN); Alain Boucher (CAN) | US 14045; Matt Fisher (USA); Greg Fisher (USA); Joyce Ferguson (USA) | US 14176; Ched Proctor (USA); Kathryn Ritchie (USA); Doug Barlow (USA) | |
| 1991 | US 11346; David Dellenbaugh (USA); Kip Hamblet (USA); Hale Walcoff (USA) | KC 14499; Larry MacDonald (CAN); Jody Swanson (CAN); Trevor Born (CAN) | US 14296; Brad Read (USA); Elizabeth Alison (USA); Terry Hutchinson (USA) | |
| 1993 | BRA 12657; Manfred Kaufmann (BRA); Renato Kaufmann (BRA); Marcelo Batista da Silva (BRA) | BRA 11721; Fernando Hackerott (BRA); Frederico Costa (BRA); Riccardo Costa (BRA) | BRA 14203; Claudio Biekarck (BRA); Gunnar Ficker (BRA); Edu Melchert (BRA) | |
| 1995 | CHI 11011; Tito Gonzalez (CHI); Rodrigo Zuazola (CHI); German Schacht (CHI) | USA 14709; Thomas Allen Iv (USA); Jim Allen (USA); Jane Allen (USA) | USA 14530; William Faude (USA); Jared Drake (USA); Brian Taboada (USA) | |
| 1997 | CAN 14834; Larry Macdonald (CAN); Jody Swanson (USA); Ian Jones (USA) | CHI 14709; Manuel Gonzalez (CHI); Juan FRANCISCO Novion (CHI); German Novion (CHI) | 14763; Timothy Healy (USA); Maria White (USA); William Healy (USA) | |
| 1999 | 11011; Alberto Gonzalez Mas (CHI); Pablo Barahona (CHI); Claus Engell (CHI) | 14730; Jeff Linton (USA); Amy Smith Linton (USA); Mark T. Taylor (USA) | 14927; Timothy Healy (USA); William Healy (USA); Anthony Kotoun (USA) | |
| 2001 | USA-15083; Jeff Linton (USA); Mark Taylor (USA); Amy Smith Linton (USA) | USA-15045; Matt Fisher (USA); Dan Moriarty (USA); Rick Bernstein (USA) | USA-14740; William Faude (USA); Ernest Dieball (USA); Jared Drake (USA) | |
| 2003 | CHI-11011; Tito Gonzalez Mas (CHI); Jay Lutz (USA); Claus Engell (CHI) | USA-14752; Steve Hayden (USA); Barr Batzer (USA); Jamey Rabbitt (USA) | USA-14900; James Crane (USA); William Crane (USA); Jim Allen (USA) | |
| 2005 | 11011; Alberto Gonzalez Parro (CHI); Diego Gonzalez Parro (CHI); Cristian Herman Sanhueza (CHI) | 15252; David Starck (USA); Ian Jones (USA); Scott Ikle (USA) | 14454; Pablo Herman (CHI); Luis Felipe Herman (CHI); Claus Engell (CHI) | |
| 2007 | USA 15083; Jeffrey Linton (USA); Amy Smith Linton (USA); Jahn Tihansky (USA) | USA 14975; Allan Terhune Jr (USA); Katie Terhune (USA); Dave Perkowski (USA) | USA 15265; Steven Davis (USA); Brian Hayes (USA); Laura Jeffers (USA) | |
| 2009 | 15045; Matt Fisher (USA); Dan Moriarty (USA); Tobi Moriarty (USA) | 15355; David Starck (USA); Jody Starck (USA); Ian Jones (USA) | 11011; Tito Gonzalez Mas (CHI); Diego Gonzalez Parro (CHI); Cristian Herman Sanhueza (CHI) | |
| 2011 | 11011; Tito Gonzalez Mas (CHI); Diego Gonzalez Parro (CHI); Cristian Herman Sanhueza (CHI) | 15333; Claus Biekarck (BRA); Gunnar Ficker (BRA); Marcelo Batista Da Silva (BRA) | 14894; Thomas Sumner (BRA); Felipe Brito (BRA); Fillipe Gil (BRA) | |
| 2013 | 15470; David Starck (USA); Jody Starck (USA); Ian Jones (USA) | 14036; Justin Coplan (USA); Danielle Prior (USA); Mike Carney (USA) | 15507; Ched Proctor (USA); James Ewing (USA); Meredith Killion (USA) | |
| 2015 | USA 15296 - 15296; Geoff Becker (USA); James Barnash (USA); Laura Beigel (USA) | USA 15499; Jody Starck (USA); Ian Jones (USA); Skip Dieball (USA) | USA 15385 - Ultimate Pressure; Billy Martin (USA); Janel Zarkowsky (USA); Chappy Hopkins (USA) | |
| 2017 | ARG 15597 - Argentina; Javier Conte (ARG); Julio Alsogaray (ARG); Paula Salerno (ARG) | USA 14298 - Freak Gasoline Fight Accident; Nicholas Sertl (USA); Dylan Farrell (USA); John Mastrandrea (USA) | PUR 14677 - Black Beauty; Raul Rios (PUR); Sebastian Higuera (PUR); Nicolas Deeb (PUR) | |
| 2019 | ARG 15597; Javier Conte (ARG); Ignacio Giammona (ARG); Paula Salerno (ARG) | CHI 14794; Felipe Robles (CHI); Andres Guevara (CHI); Paula Herman (CHI) | USA 15611; David Starck (USA); Tom Starck (USA); Jenna Probst (USA) | |
| 2022 | USA 15611 - Team PatStrong; David Starck (USA); Tom Starck (USA); Jenna Probst (USA) | CHI 11011 - Ojo de Lince; Tito Gonzalez (CHI); Alberto Gonzalez Jnr. (CHI); Zeke Horowitz (USA) | ARG 15597 - Argentina; Javier Conte (ARG); Martina Silva (ARG); Trinidad Silva (ARG) | |
| 2023 | ECU 14647 - Marraqueta; Jonathan Martinetti (ECU); Moira Padilla (ECU); Alisson Haon (ECU) | USA 15611 - Team PatStrong; David Starck (USA); Jenna Probst (USA); Thomas Starck (USA) | USA 15561 - Danilu; Augie Diaz (USA); Laura Jeffers (USA); UNKNOWN | |
| 2025 | CHI 14794 - EL DOCTORADO; Felipe Robles (CHI); Andres Guevara (CHI); Paula Herman (CHI) | USA 15507 - Veggie Sub; Ched Proctor (USA); Meredith Killion (USA); Samuel Blouin (USA) | USA 15296 - Silver Girl; Geoff Becker (USA); Jim Barnash (USA); Laura Jeffers (USA) | |
