= Sailing at the 2007 Pan American Games =

Sailing competitions at the 2007 Pan American Games in Rio de Janeiro will be held in July 2007 at the Marina da Gloria.

== Men's events ==
Event	Gold	Silver	Bronze
Sailboard	Ricardo Santos; Brazil	Mariano Reutemann; Argentina	David Mier; Mexico
Laser class	Andrew Campbell; United States	Robert Scheidt; Brazil	Julio Alsogaray; Argentina

== Women's events ==
Event	Gold	Silver	Bronze
Sailboard	Dominique Vallee; Canada	Patrícia Freitas; Brazil	Florencia Gutiérrez; Argentina
Laser Radial class	Paige Railey; United States	Tania Elías Calles; Mexico	Adriana Kostiw; Brazil

== Open events ==
Event	Gold	Silver	Bronze
Sunfish class	Eduardo Cordero; Venezuela	Alexander Zimmermam; Peru	Paul Foerster; United States
Snipe class	Alexandre Paradeda; Pedro Amaral; Brazil	Pablo Defazio; Eduardo Medici; Uruguay	Jorge Xavier Murrieta; Andrés Akle Carranza; Mexico
Lightning class	Alberto González; Cristián Herman; Diego González; Chile	David Starck; Jody Starck; Bill Faude; United States	Cláudio Biekarck; Gunnar Ficker; Marcelo Silva; Brazil
Hobie 16 class	Juan Ignacio Maegli; Cristina Guirola; Guatemala	Gonzalo Cendra; Yamil Saba; Venezuela	Enrique Figueroa; Carla Malatrasi; Puerto Rico
J/24 class	Mauricio Oliveira; Carlos Jordão; Alexandre Silva; Daniel Santiago; Brazil	Alejo Rigoni; Sebastian Brusa; Joaquin Duarte; Gustavo Gonzalez; Argentina	Rossi Milev; Mike Wolfs; Mark Goodyear; Erwyn Naidoo; Canada
