= Sailing at the 2011 Pan American Games =

- Venue: Vallarta Yacht Club
- Dates: October 17–23
- Competitors: 140 from 19 nations

Sailing competitions at the 2011 Pan American Games in Guadalajara were held from October 17 to October 23 at the Vallarta Yacht Club in Puerto Vallarta.

== Medal summary ==
=== Medal table ===
* Host nation (Mexico)

Rank	Nation	Gold	Silver	Bronze	Total
1	Brazil	5	1	1	7
2	Argentina	2	1	1	4
3	Chile	1	1	1	3
4	Puerto Rico	1	0	0	1
5	United States	0	4	2	6
6	Mexico*	0	2	1	3
7	Guatemala	0	0	2	2
8	Uruguay	0	0	1	1
Totals (8 entries)		9	9	9	27

=== Men's events ===
Event	Gold	Silver	Bronze
Sailboard	Ricardo Santos; Brazil	Mariano Reutemann; Argentina	David Mier; Mexico
Laser class	Julio Alsogaray; Argentina	Matías del Solar; Chile	Juan Ignacio Maegli; Guatemala

=== Women's events ===
Event	Gold	Silver	Bronze
Sailboard	Patrícia Freitas; Brazil	Demita Vega; Mexico	Farrah Hall; United States
Laser Radial class	Cecilia Carranza; Argentina	Tania Elías Calles; Mexico	Paige Railey; United States

=== Open events ===
Event	Gold	Silver	Bronze
Sunfish class	Matheus Dellagnello; Brazil	Paul Foerster; United States	Francisco Renna; Argentina
Snipe class	Brazil; Alexandre do Amaral; Gabriel Borges	United States; Agustin Diaz; Kathleen Tocke	Uruguay; Pablo Defazio; Manfredo Finck
Lightning class	Chile; Alberto González; Diego González; Cristián Herman	United States; Jody Lutz; Derek Gauger; Jay Lutz	Brazil; Cláudio Biekarck; Marcelo da Silva; Gunnar Ficker
Hobie 16 class	Puerto Rico; Enrique Figueroa; Victor Aponte	Brazil; Bernardo Arndt; Bruno Oliveira	Guatemala; Jason Hess; Jose Hernandez
J/24 class	Brazil; Mauricio Oliveira; Alexandre de Silva; Guilherme Hamelmann; Daniel Santiago	United States; John Mollicone; George Abdullah III; Geoffrey Becker; Daniel Rabin	Chile; Matías Seguel; Cristóbal Grez; Marc Jux; Juan Lira

== Schedule ==
All times are Central Daylight Time (UTC−5).

Day	Date	Start	Finish	Event	Phase
Day 4	Monday October 17, 2011	13:00	18:00	All classes	Races 1 and 2
Day 5	Tuesday October 18, 2011	13:00	18:00	All classes	Races 3 and 4
Day 6	Wednesday October 19, 2011	13:00	18:00	All classes	Races 5 and 6
Day 8	Friday October 21, 2011	13:00	18:00	All classes	Races 7 and 8
Day 9	Saturday October 22, 2011	13:00	18:00	All classes	Races 9 and 10
Day 10	Sunday October 23, 2011	13:00	18:00	All classes	Medal races

== Qualification ==
Qualification is official as of March 10, 2011 from the Pan American sailing website.

Nation	Men		Women		Open					Total	
Nation	Sailboard	Laser	Sailboard	Laser Radial	Sunfish	Snipe	Lightning	Hobie 16	J/24	Boats	Athletes
Argentina	X	X	X	X	X	X	X	X	X	9	16
Bermuda					X					1	1
Brazil	X	X	X	X	X	X	X	X	X	9	16
Canada	X	X	X	X			X	X	X	7	13
Chile		X		X	X	X	X		X	6	12
Colombia	X	X			X	X				4	5
Cuba	X		X			X				3	4
Dominican Republic		X								1	1
Ecuador				X		X	X			3	6
Guatemala		X		X	X			X		4	5
Mexico	X	X	X	X	X	X	X	X	X	9	16
Netherlands Antilles			X	X	X					3	3
Peru	X			X	X				X	4	7
Puerto Rico	X				X	X		X		4	6
Trinidad and Tobago		X								1	1
United States	X	X	X	X	X	X	X	X	X	9	16
Uruguay		X		X		X				3	4
Venezuela	X	X		X	X			X		5	6
Virgin Islands		X		X						2	2
Total: 19 NOCs	10	13	7	13	12	10	7	8	7	87	140
