= Raúl Ríos =

Puerto Rican sailor (born 1993)

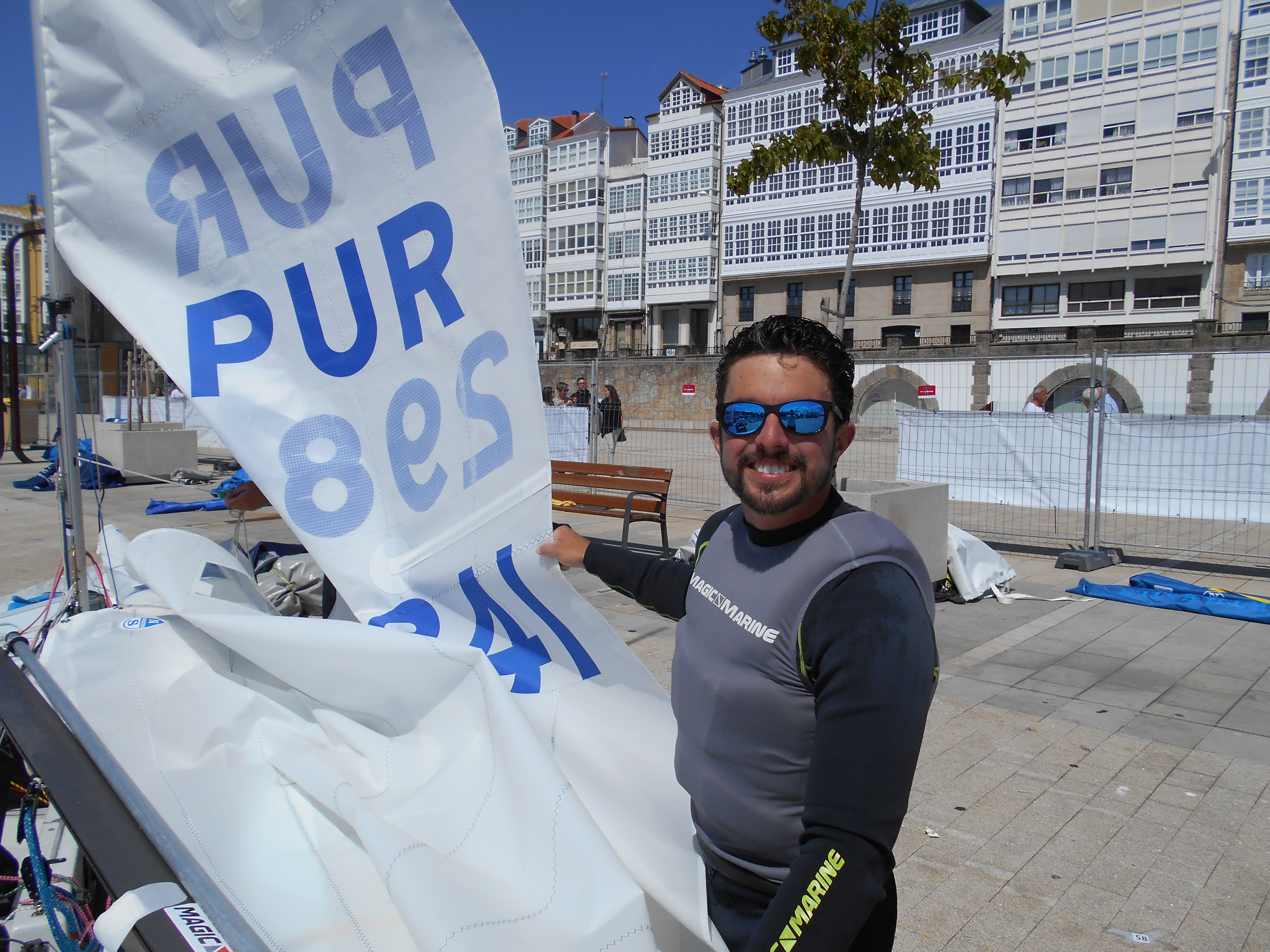
- Ríos in 2017

Personal information
- Full name: Raúl Andrés Ríos de Choudens
- Nationality: Puerto Rico
- Born: 3 December 1993 (age 32) Guaynabo, Puerto Rico

Sailing career
- Sport: Sailing
- College team: Boston College
- Class: Snipe
Medal record
Sailing
Representing Puerto Rico
Optimist World Championships
Gold medal – first place	2008 Çeşme	Optimist
Snipe World Championships
Gold medal – first place	2017 Corunna	Snipe
Pan American Games
Gold medal – first place	2015 Toronto	Snipe
Central American and Caribbean Games
Gold medal – first place	2010 Mayagüez	Snipe
Gold medal – first place	2014 Veracruz	Snipe
Gold medal – first place	2018 Barranquilla	Snipe
Lightning South American Championship
Bronze medal – third place	2017 Salinas, Ecuador	Lightning
Lightning World Championship
Bronze medal – third place	2017 Salinas, Ecuador	Lightning

Raúl Andrés Ríos de Choudens (born 3 December 1993 in Guaynabo, Puerto Rico), is a world class sailor in the Optimist, Snipe, and Lightning classes.

== Early life and career ==
He began sailing Optimists at the age of ten at the Club Náutico de San Juan, and became North American champion and World champion in 2008.

From the Optimist class, he moved into the 420, Snipe and Lightning classes. He started sailing in the Snipe Class by crewing for Ernesto Rodriguez just after summer of 2008, training for the Western Hemisphere's championship in Uruguay that November where they finished third overall. He then took the skipper position, with Fernando Monllor from the Club Náutico de Ponce as a crew, competing in the US Nationals, the North Americans, the Western Hemisphere and Oriental Championship, the Pan American Games and the Central American and Caribbean Games.

He won the following regattas:

- United States National Championship (2013, 2014, 2015)
- North American Championship (2011, 2012, 2015, 2022)
- Western Hemisphere & Orient Championship (2014)
- South American Championship (2023)

In 2017, he won another world championship, the Snipe class Worlds, with Max Agnese as his crew, in Corunna, the bronze medal at the Lightning Southamericans, and World Championship at Salinas Yacht Club, with Sebastian Higuera and Nicolas Deeb.

== Pan American Games ==
- 4th place in Snipe at Guadalajara 2011.
- 1st place in Snipe at Toronto 2015.

== Central American and Caribbean Games ==
- 1st place in Snipe at Mayagüez 2010.
- 1st place in Snipe at Veracruz 2014.
- 1st place in Snipe at Barranquilla 2018.
- 1st place in Snipe at San Salvador 2023.

== College ==
Ríos sailed for Boston College, where he earned ICSA Coed All-American Honors, earned first team All-NEISA Skipper Honors, and was named an All-America Skipper in 2013,2014,215 and 2016.

He earned the 2015-16 Eagle of the Year Award, and was one of the three finalists for the prestigious College Sailor of the Year award. Raul served as Team Captain and encouraged his team to engage in community service projects and high academic success.
