= Kostiw =

Kostiw is a surname. Notable people with the surname include:

- Adriana Kostiw (born 1974), Brazilian sailor
- Michael Kostiw (born 1947), Central Intelligence Agency employee
