= Sailing at the 2018 Central American and Caribbean Games =

- Venue: Marina de Puerto Velero
- Location: (Colombia) Tubará
- Dates: 19–25 July

The sailing competition at the 2018 Central American and Caribbean Games was held from 19 to 25 July at the Marina de Puerto Velero in Tubará, Colombia.

== Medal summary ==
=== Men's events ===
Event	Gold	Silver	Bronze
Laser	Ignacio Maegli (GUA)	Yanic Gentry (MEX)	Andrey Quintero (COL)
RS:X	Mack van den Eerenbeemt (ARU)	Ignacio Berenguer (MEX)	Daniel Flores (VEN)
Formula Kite	Xantos Villegas (MEX)	Jhon Mora (COL)	José Rodríguez (PUR)

=== Women's events ===
Event	Gold	Silver	Bronze
Laser Radial	Elena Oetling (MEX)	Daniela Rivera (VEN)	Isabella Maegli (GUA)

=== Open events ===
Event	Gold	Silver	Bronze
Sunfish	David Hernández (GUA)	Lester Hernández (CUB)	Peter Stanton (ISV)
Snipe	Puerto Rico (PUR); Raúl Ríos; José Díaz	Puerto Rico (PUR); Ramón González; Manuel González	Cuba (CUB); René Torrecillas; Carlos Exposito
Hobie Cat 16	Guatemala (GUA); Jason Hess; Katya Castellanos	Venezuela (VEN); Yamil Saba; Gonzalo Cendra	Puerto Rico (PUR); Enrique Figueroa; Francheska Valdes

==== Controversy ====
The Hobie Cat 16 medal standing is currently being contested by Puerto Rico. Puerto Rico would have won the gold medal had it not being for the Venezuelan team filing a compliant. The Venezuelan team incorrectly filed the complaint for the seventh race instead of the correct sixth race. The event judges granted Puerto Rico's reconsideration of their initial decision, but the next day they reversed their ruling. Puerto Rico appealed the ruling to ODACABE, who in turn, after finding irregularities on the matter have requested the assistance of the International Sailing Federation. If Puerto Rico's reconsideration where to be granted, Guatemala would drop to bronze, Venezuela would remain in silver, and Puerto Rico would be awarded the gold medal for the event.

== Medal table ==
* Host nation (Colombia)

Rank	Nation	Gold	Silver	Bronze	Total
1	Guatemala (GUA)	3	0	1	4
2	Mexico (MEX)	2	2	0	4
3	Puerto Rico (PUR)	1	1	2	4
4	Aruba (ARU)	1	0	0	1
5	Venezuela (VEN)	0	2	1	3
6	Colombia (COL)*	0	1	1	2
6	Cuba (CUB)	0	1	1	2
8	U.S. Virgin Islands (ISV)	0	0	1	1
Totals (8 entries)		7	7	7	21
