= Sailing at the 2023 Central American and Caribbean Games =

- Venue: Lago Ilopango
- Location: (El Salvador) San Salvador
- Dates: 24 June – 1 July

The sailing competition at the 2023 Central American and Caribbean Games is scheduled to be held from 24 June to 1st July at the Lago Ilopango in San Salvador, El Salvador.

== Medal table ==
* Host nation (El Salvador)

Rank	Nation	Gold	Silver	Bronze	Total
1	Puerto Rico (PUR)	2	0	2	4
2	Centro Caribe Sports (CCS)	1	1	2	4
3	Cuba (CUB)	1	1	0	2
4	Mexico (MEX)	1	0	1	2
5	El Salvador (ESA)*	1	0	0	1
6	Venezuela (VEN)	0	2	0	2
7	Aruba (ARU)	0	1	0	1
7	Colombia (COL)	0	1	0	1
9	Saint Lucia (LCA)	0	0	1	1
Totals (9 entries)		6	6	6	18

== Medal summary ==
=== Men's events ===
Event	Gold	Silver	Bronze
Ilca 7	Enrique Arathoon (ESA)	Just van Aanholt (ARU)	Luc Chevrier (LCA)
Sunfish	David Hernandez (CCS)	Juan Canizalez (CCS)	Esneiry Pérez (DOM)

=== Women's events ===
Event	Gold	Silver	Bronze
Ilca 6	Elena Oetling (MEX)	Daniela Rivera (VEN)	Cristina Castellanos (CCS)
Sunfish	Jaimet Ruano (CUB)	Ana Sofía Bermúdez (COL)	Josselyn Echeverria (CCS)

=== Open events ===
Event	Gold	Silver	Bronze
Hobie 16	Puerto Rico (PUR); Francisco Figueroa; Faith Payne	Venezuela (VEN); Yamil Saba; Maria Orihuela	Puerto Rico (PUR); Adriana De Cardenas; Enrique Figueroa
Snipe	Puerto Rico (PUR); Andrea Riefkohl; Raul Rios	Cuba (CUB); Nelido Manso; Sanlay Castro	Puerto Rico (PUR); Virginia Carrero; Ramon Gonzalez
