= Zigong Lantern Group =

- Industry: Lantern festival
- Headquarters: Orlando, Florida, United States
- Key people: Justin Corsa (Chief of the Board and CEO)
- Website: zigonglanterngroup.com

Zigong Lantern Group is a lantern arts manufacturing company based in Orlando, Florida, United States. It is operated by Zigong Lantern Group Worldwide. Justin Corsa is the incumbent chief executive officer of the company.

The company has created lantern displays for lantern festivals internationally, including France, the United Kingdom, and the United States.

It is a member of IAAPA, Association of Zoos & Aquariums (AZA), Zoological Association of America (ZAA), and Florida Attractions Association (FAA).

== History ==
It was formed after the merger of companies located in Zigong, Shanghai, Chengdu, Chongqing, and the United States.

The company has two subsidiaries: one named Zigong Lantern Group Worldwide which is based in Florida, and another named Zigong Shijieyijia Culture Communication which owns a factory located in China.

In 2019, the company organized Chinese Festival of Lights on 60 acres of land at Nashville Zoo. They also formed a three-year partnership with Magnolia for the festival, Lights of Magnolia.

In 2020, one million lantern lights were used in Luminosa Festival which was held on 13 acres of area. The lanterns used were made with hand-made silk and steel material.

In 2021, the Festival of Illumination: World of Lights! was organized at Southwick's Zoo. Later, in November, Festival of Lanterns at Cowabunga Bay, Las Vegas, was opened. In the same year, they also produced Winter Illuminations at Yorkshire Wildlife Park in Doncaster, the United Kingdom. Additionally, they went under contract with the French government of Ville de Béziers, in France to decorate their main plaza.

In August 2022, the company received Best in Show award from the Florida Attractions Association. In the same month, Zigong was involved in the production of the Land of Lights festival at Gulliver's Resort which was held between November 2022 and February 2023. At the Kansas City Zoo, Zigong organized the GloWild lantern festival, which ran from September 2022 through the end of December 2022.

In November 2022, Zigong received Brass Ring Award given by the International Association of Amusement Parks and Attractions.

The company has trademarked their name in Europe and the United Kingdom.
