= Sailing at the 2011 Pan American Games – J/24 =

J/24 class at the 2011 Pan American Games
- Venue: Vallarta Yacht Club
- Dates: October 17 – October 23
- Competitors: 32 from 7 nations

Medalists
| Gold medal | Mauricio Oliveira; Alexandre de Silva; Guilherme Hamelmann; Daniel Santiago | Brazil |
| Silver medal | John Mollicone; George Abdullah III; Geoffrey Becker; Daniel Rabin | United States |
| Bronze medal | Matias Seguel; Cristobal Grez; Marc Jux; Juan Lira | Chile |

The J/24 class competition of the sailing events at the 2011 Pan American Games in Guadalajara were held from October 17 to October 23 at the Vallarta Yacht Club in Puerto Vallarta. The defending champion was the boat from Brazil.

Points were assigned based on the finishing position in each race (1 for first, 2 for second, etc.). The points were totaled from the top 9 results of the first 10 races, with lower totals being better. If a boat was disqualified or did not complete the race, 8 points were assigned for that race (as there were 7 boats in this competition). The top 5 boats at that point competed in the final race, with placings counting double for final score. The boat with the lowest total score won.

== Schedule ==
All times are Central Standard Time (UTC-6).

| Date | Time | Round |
|---|---|---|
| October 17, 2011 | 13:00 | 1 and 2 races |
| October 18, 2011 | 13:00 | 3 and 4 races |
| October 19, 2011 | 13:00 | 5 and 6 races |
| October 21, 2011 | 13:00 | 7 and 8 races |
| October 22, 2011 | 13:00 | 9 and 10 races |
| October 23, 2011 | 14:02 | Medal race |

== Results ==
Race M is the medal race in which only the top 5 competitors took part. Each boat can drop its lowest result provided that all ten races are completed. If less than ten races are completed all races will count. Boats cannot drop their result in the medal race.

| Rank | Athlete | Race | | | | | | | | | | | Total Points | Net Points |
| Rank | Athlete | 1 | 2 | 3 | 4 | 5 | 6 | 7 | 8 | 9 | 10 | M | Total Points | Net Points |
|---|---|---|---|---|---|---|---|---|---|---|---|---|---|---|
| 1st place, gold medalist(s) | Brazil; Mauricio Oliveira; Alexandre de Silva; Guilherme Hamelmann; Daniel Santiago | 2 | 3 | 1 | 1 | 2 | (6) | 1 | 6 | 1 | 3 | 6 | 32 | 26 |
| 2nd place, silver medalist(s) | United States; John Mollicone; George Abdullah III; Geoffrey Becker; Daniel Rabin | 1 | 1 | 2 | 3 | 1 | 3 | 2 | (5) | 2 | 2 | 10 | 32 | 27 |
| 3rd place, bronze medalist(s) | Chile; Matias Seguel; Cristobal Grez; Marc Jux; Juan Lira | 6 | 2 | 5 | (8); DSQ | 5 | 1 | 8 OCS | 2 | 4 | 1 | 2 | 44 | 36 |
| 4 | Peru; Ignacio Arrospide; Luis Olcese; Joel Raffo; Christian Sas | 3 | 4 | 3 | 5 | (6) | 4 | 4 | 1 | 5 | 5 | 4 | 44 | 38 |
| 5 | Argentina; Francisco van Avermaete; Rafael de Martis; Juan Galvan; Carlos Lacchini | 4 | (6) | 4 | 2 | 3 | 2 | 3 | 4 | 6 | 6 | 8 | 48 | 42 |
| 6 | Mexico; Jorge Xavier Murrieta; Julian Fernandez; Bernard Minkow; Alejandro Murrieta | 5 | 5 | 6 | 4 | 4 | 5 | (8); DSQ' | 3 | 3 | 4 | – | 47 | 39 |
| 7 | Canada; Roger Burns; Andrew Burns; Graeme Clendenan; Gary Harmer | (7) | 7 | 7 | 6 | 7 | 7 | 5 | 7 | 7 | 7 | – | 67 | 60 |

== See also ==
- List of J/24 championships
