= Sailing at the 2015 Pan American Games – Hobie 16 =

Hobie 16 at the 2015 Pan American Games
- Venue: Royal Canadian Yacht Club
- Dates: July 12 - July 19
- Competitors: 14 from 7 nations

Medalists
Gold medal	Jason Hess; Irene Abascal van Blerk	Guatemala
Silver medal	Mark Modderman; Grace Modderman	United States
Bronze medal	Enrique Figueroa; Franchesca Valdes	Puerto Rico

The Hobie 16 competition of the sailing events at the 2015 Pan American Games in Toronto was held from July 12 to July 19 at the Royal Canadian Yacht Club.

Points were assigned based on the finishing position in each race (1 for first, 2 for second, etc.). The points were totaled from the top 11 results of the first 12 races, with lower totals being better. If a team was disqualified or did not complete the race, 8 points were assigned for that race (as there were 7 teams in this competition). The top 5 teams at that point competed in the final race, with placings counting double for final score. The team with the lowest total score won.

== Schedule ==
All times are Eastern Daylight Time (UTC-4).

Date	Time	Round
July 12, 2015	11:35	Race 1
July 13, 2015	11:35	Races 2 and 3
July 14, 2015	11:35	Races 4 and 5
July 15, 2015	11:35	Races 6, 7 and 8
July 16, 2015	11:35	Races 9, 10 and 11
July 17, 2015	11:35	Race 12
July 19, 2015	13:45	Medal race

== Results ==
Race M is the medal race.

Rank	Athlete	Nation	Race													Total Points	Net Points
Rank	Athlete	Nation	1	2	3	4	5	6	7	8	9	10	11	12	M	Total Points	Net Points
1st place, gold medalist(s)	Jason Hess; Irene Abascal van Blerk	Guatemala	2	3	(6)	5	1	5	2	4	1	1	1	1	4	36	30
2nd place, silver medalist(s)	Mark Modderman; Grace Modderman	United States	1	(6)	1	4	4	3	3	5	4	4	2	2	6	45	39
3rd place, bronze medalist(s)	Enrique Figueroa; Franchesca Valdes	Puerto Rico	5	1	5	(7)	3	1	1	3	6	6	4	7	2	51	44
4	Armando Noriega; Carlota Iturbe	Mexico	6	2	3	2	5	2	5	2	(7)	3	7	6	8	58	51
5	Daniel Borg; Liana Giovando	Canada	4	4.3; RDG	4	3	7	(8); DSQ	6	1	3	2	5	3	10	60.3	52.3
6	Claudio Teixeira; Bruno Dos Reis Oliveira	Brazil	(7)	4	2	1	2	6	4	7	2	7	6	5		53	46
7	Yamil Saba; Gonzalo Cendra	Venezuela	3	5	(7)	6	6	4	7	6	5	5	3	4		61	54
