= Sailing at the 2014 Central American and Caribbean Games =

- Venue: Camino Real Beach, Veramar Marina and Anton Lizardo Herioic Navy School
- Location: Veracruz, Mexico
- Dates: 23–28 November

The sailing competition at the 2014 Central American and Caribbean Games was held in Veracruz, Mexico.

The tournament was scheduled to be held from 23 to 28 November at Camino Real Beach, Veramar Marina and Anton Lizardo Herioic Navy School.

== Medal summary ==
=== Men's events ===
Event	Gold	Silver	Bronze
RS:X	David M. Mier y Teran (MEX)	Ignacio Berenguer (MEX)	Daniel Flores (VEN)
Laser	Juan I. Maegli (GUA)	Cy Chris Thompson (ISV)	Enrique J. Arathoon (ESA)

=== Women's events ===
Event	Gold	Silver	Bronze
RS:X	Demita Vega (MEX)	Nicole I. Level (MEX)	Dismary Bonillo (VEN)
Laser Radial	Philipine van Aanholt (ARU)	Daniela Rivera (VEN)	Andrea D. Aldana (GUA)

=== Open events ===
Event	Gold	Silver	Bronze
Sunfish	David Gonzalez (VEN)	Julio Silva (VEN)	Jacobo Margules (MEX)
Snipe	Puerto Rico (PUR); Raul A. Rios; Fernando I. Monllor	Cuba (CUB); Raul M. Diaz; Rafael R. Garcia	Puerto Rico (PUR); Agustin Lazaro; Juan F. Negron
Hobie Cat 16	Puerto Rico (PUR); Enrique Figueroa; Franchesca Valdes	Venezuela (VEN); Yamil Saba; Gonzalo Cendra	Guatemala (GUA); Jason A. Hess; Irene Abascal
J-24	U.S. Virgin Islands (ISV); Taylor Canfield; Addison Caproni; Max Nicbarg; Phillip Shannon	Guatemala (GUA); Juan E. Maegli; Eduardo Cabarrus; José X. Castillo; Rodrigo Aguirre	Puerto Rico (PUR); Efrain Lugo; Melvin Gonzalez; Pablo A. Mendez; Alejandro J. Berrios

== Medal table ==
* Host nation (Mexico)

Rank	Nation	Gold	Silver	Bronze	Total
1	Mexico*	2	2	1	5
2	Puerto Rico	2	0	2	4
3	Venezuela	1	3	2	6
4	Guatemala	1	1	2	4
5	U.S. Virgin Islands	1	1	0	2
6	Aruba	1	0	0	1
7	Cuba	0	1	0	1
8	El Salvador	0	0	1	1
Totals (8 entries)		8	8	8	24
