= Bruce Goldsmith (sailor) =

American sports sailor (b. 1936, d. 2007)

Personal information
- Full name: Bruce Gray Goldsmith
- Nickname: The Bruin
- Born: March 21, 1936
- Died: June 3, 2007 (aged 71) Monroe County, Michigan
Medal record
Sailing
Representing United States
World Championship
Gold medal – first place	1963 Worlds	Lightning
Gold medal – first place	1965 Worlds	Lightning
Gold medal – first place	1967 Worlds	Lightning
Gold medal – first place	1973 Worlds	Lightning
Pan American Games
Gold medal – first place	1967 Pan American Games	Lightning
Gold medal – first place	1975 Pan American Games	Lightning
North American Championships
Gold medal – first place	1967	Lightning
Gold medal – first place	1973	Lightning
Gold medal – first place	1974	Lightning
Gold medal – first place	1975	Lightning
Gold medal – first place	1976	Lightning
Silver medal – second place	1969 Milwaukee	Soling

Bruce Goldsmith (March 21, 1936 – June 3, 2007) was a sailor from Michigan. He won twice the Worlds in the Lightning class, was many times North American Champion in several classes as well as gold medalist in the 1967 and 1975 Pan American Games. He died in 2007 at the age of 71 while racing during a storm on Lake Erie.

He was former Commodore of the Devils Lake Yacht Club and had held memberships at the Lake Geneva Sailing Club in Wisconsin and The Chicago Corinthian Yacht Club.
