= Masters Lightning World Championship =

Youth sailing regatta for Lightning

The Lightning Youth World Championship is an bi-annual international sailing regatta for lightning (dinghy), organized by the host club on behalf of the International Lightning Class Association and recognized by World Sailing, the sports IOC recognized governing body.

== Editions ==
Host clubs of the Masters Lightning World Championship

Edition			Host			Boats	Participant					Ref
Ed	Date	Year	Host club	Location	Country	Boats	Sailors	M	F	Nats	Cont.	Ref
1	-	1999	Salinas Yacht Club	Salinas	Ecuador							
2	18-22 Jul	2001	Circolo Velico Marsala	Marsala	Italy							
3	-	2003	Coral Reef Yacht Club	Miami	United States							
4	-	2005	Club de Yates Higuerillas	Concón	Chile							
5	-	2007	Yacht Club of Greece	Athens	Greece							
6	-	2009	Mallets Bay Yacht Club	Colchester	United States							
7	-	2011	Iate Clube Armacao de Buzios	Armação dos Búzios	Brazil							
8		2012	Club Velico Castiglionese	Castiglione del Lago	Italy							
9	15-19 Jul	2015	Buffalo Canoe Club	Fort Erie	Canada	21						
10	17-20 Nov	2017	Salinas Yacht Club	Salinas	Ecuador	23						
11	23-27 Nov	2019	Espoon Pursiseura ry	Espoo	Finland	22	66			5	3	
12	12-16 May	2022	Carolina Yacht Club	Wrightsville Beach	United States	42	126			2	1	
13	16-23 Oct	2023	Club Naval Santa Cruz de Castillogrande	Cartagena	Colombia	14	42			5	4	
14	Jun	2025	Nautical Athletic Club of Voula	Voula	Greece	17						

== Masters World Championships ==
Games	Gold	Silver	Bronze	Ref.
1999 Salina; Ecuador				
2001 Marsala; Italy	Richard Hallagan; Hendrix Ten Eyck; Tammi Jamison Canada Peter Hall; Phillip Kerrigan; Jay Deacon			
2003; USA	USA14900; James Crane (USA); Larry Bone; Kip Hamblet	USA14866; Bill Mauk (USA); John Humphrey; Claus Engle	USA14739; Jack Elfman (USA); Cindy Lister-Elfman; Mike Holly	
2005; Chile	CAN 14768; Peter Hall (CAN); Phillip Kerrigan (CAN); Jay Deacon (CAN)	USA 15122; Jim Carson (USA); Jay Lutz (USA); Michael Schon (USA)	USA 14866; Bill Mauk (USA); Bill Fastiggi (USA); Suzie Cobrun (USA)	
2007 Athens	Bill Mauk; Vladimir Kulinichenko; Michel Sumpton			
2009 Colchester, VT	Jim Crane; Brenda Crane; Tom Allen			
2011 Buzios, Brazil	Claus Biekarck; Gunner Ficker; Marcelo Batista da Silva			
2013; Italy	Ched Proctor; Jamie Ewing; Jay Lurie			
2015; Canada	USA 15470; David Dellenbaugh (USA); Jeff Eiber (USA); Jay Lurie (USA)	ECU 14673 - Black Beauty; Juan Santos (ECU); Juan Jose Feretti (ECU); Hank Wissenz (ECU)	USA 15445; Matt Fisher (USA); Dan Moriarty (USA); Tobi Moriarty (USA)	
2017; Ecuador; 23 Boats	USA 15507; Ched Proctor (USA); Meredith Killion; Todd Wake	BRA 14893; Cláudio Biekarck (BRA); Gunnar Ficker; Marcelo Silva	USA 15590; Jeff Linton (USA); Amy Smith Linton; Steve Davis	
2019; Finland; 27 Boats	USA 15507; Ched Proctor (USA); Bill Faude (USA); Meredith Killion (USA)	USA 9 Tom Allen (USA); Jane Allen (USA); Shelby Allen (USA)	CAN 15499; Larry MacDonald (CAN); Jody Starck (CAN); Ian Jones (CAN)	
2022; USA; 42 Boats	USA 15499; Jody Starck; William Faude; Randy Borges; Tom Starck	USA 15496; Marvin Beckmann; Jimmy Barnash; Andrew Brennan	15507; Ched Proctor; Meredith Killion; Sam Blouin	
2023; Colombia; 14 Boats	USA 15561 - Danilu (61); Augie Diaz (USA); Kim Couranz (USA); Alfonso Garcia Bringas (USA)	USA 15595 - Hard Asset (15); Joshua Goldman (USA); Jackson Benvenutti (USA); Monica Morgan (USA)	USA 15499 (21); Jody Starck (USA); Ian Jones (USA); Debbie Probst (USA)	
2025; Greece; 17 Boats	USA 15561 - Danilu (61); Augie Diaz (USA); UNKNOWN; UNKNOWN	USA 15611 - Team Patstrong; David Starck (USA); UNKNOWN; UNKNOWN	USA 15296 - Silver Girl; Geoff Becker (USA); UNKNOWN; UNKNOWN	
