= WindRider 17 =

Development
- Designer: Jim Brown
- Year: 2002
- Name: WindRider 17

Boat
- Draft: 18 in (460 mm)

Hull
- Type: open trimaran
- Hull weight: 181 kg (399 lb)
- LOA: 17 ft 4 in (5.28 m)
- Beam: 12 ft 11 in (3.94 m) (sailing); 8 ft 6 in (2.59 m) (on trailer)

Rig
- Mast height: 7.3 m (24 ft)

Sails
- Mainsail area: 96 sq ft (8.9 m^{2})
- Jib/genoa area: 43 sq ft (4.0 m^{2})

The WindRider 17 is a small trimaran sailboat with foot pedal steering, for up to four people. It was designed by well known multihull sailboat designer Jim Brown and launched by WindRider LLC in 2002. Production had ended by 2020.

== See also ==
- List of multihulls
