= Alexandre do Amaral =

Brazilian-Dutch sailor and coach (born 1982)

Alexandre Tinoco do Amaral
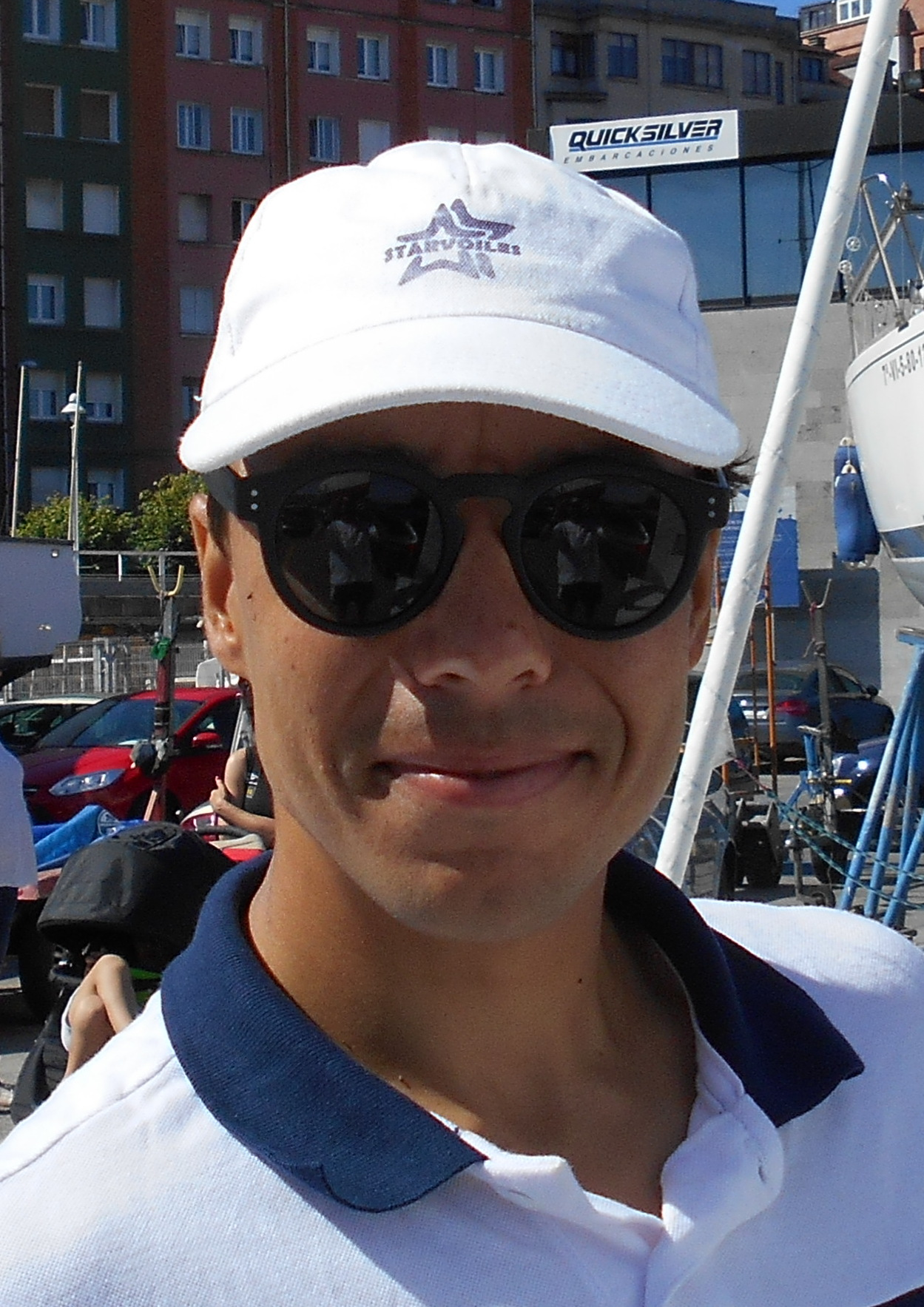

Personal information
- Full name: Alexandre Tinoco do Amaral
- Nationality: Netherlands
- Born: 3 December 1982 (age 43) Rio de Janeiro, Brazil

Sailing career
- Sport: Sailing
- Club: Club Marítimo de Mahón
- Class: Snipe
Medal record
Sailing
Representing Brazil
Pan American Games
Gold medal – first place	2011 Guadalajara	Snipe
South American Games
Silver medal – second place	2010 Medellín	Snipe
Snipe World Championships
Gold medal – first place	2011 Rungsted	Snipe
Snipe South American Championship
Gold medal – first place	2012 Manta	Snipe

Alexandre Tinoco do Amaral (Rio de Janeiro, Brazil, 3 December 1982) is a Brazilian-Dutch competitive sailor and sailing coach.

He was world champion of snipe in 2011, South American champion in 2012, he won gold at the 2011 Pan American Games and silver medal at the 2010 South American Games.

In 2024 he won the Snipe European Cup as a crew member of the Belgian Manu Hens.

He is the brother of Mário Tinoco do Amaral, who is also an accomplished sailor, who has been a world junior champion twice (2007 and 2009), and South American champion in 2013.

Since 2024 he is the coach of the ILCA 4 and 6 teams of the Mahón Yacht Club (Club Marítimo de Mahón) after the departure of long standing olympic coach Damián Borrás from the position.

== World Championships ==
- 1st place in Snipe at Rungsted 2011.

== South American Championship ==
- 1st place in Snipe at Manta 2012.

== Pan American Games ==
- 1st place in Snipe at Guadalajara 2011.

== South American Games ==
- 2nd place in Snipe at Medellín 2010.
