= Sailing at the 2006 Central American and Caribbean Games =

- Location: Cartagena
- Dates: 15-30 July

The Sailing competition at the 2006 Central American and Caribbean Games was held in Cartagena, Colombia. The tournament was scheduled to be held from 15–30 July 2006.

== Medal summary ==
=== Men's events ===
Event	Gold		Silver		Bronze	
Laser	Cy Ch. Thompson (ISV)	15	Raúl A. Aguayo (DOM)	21	Carl B. James (ATG)	28
Mistral	David M. Mier (MEX)	7	Carlos J. Flores (VEN)	22	Daniel Flores (VEN)	24
Sunfish	Eduardo J. Cordero (VEN)	9	Juan J. Delgado (GUA)	28	Mark R. Chirinos (VEN)	32

=== Women's events ===
Event	Gold		Silver		Bronze	
Laser Radial	Tania Elías (MEX)	11	Maricela Duarte (CUB)	24	Paula Douat (COL)	28

=== Open events ===
Event	Gold		Silver		Bronze	
Snipe	Cuba; Jorge Téllez; Yudiel Suárez	15	Cuba; Michel Leyva; Darien Martínez	18	Puerto Rico; Gabriel Rodríguez; Jorge E. Santiago	20
Hobie Cat 16	Puerto Rico; Enrique Figueroa; Carla Malatrasi	8	Guatemala; Juan I. Maegli; Ana C. Guirola	20	Puerto Rico; Pedro E. Colón; Martín J. E. Roldán	22

== Medal table ==
* Host nation (Colombia)

Rank	Nation	Gold	Silver	Bronze	Total
1	Mexico	2	0	0	2
2	Cuba	1	2	0	3
3	Venezuela	1	1	2	4
4	Puerto Rico	1	0	2	3
5	U.S. Virgin Islands	1	0	0	1
6	Guatemala	0	2	0	2
7	Dominican Republic	0	1	0	1
8	Colombia*	0	0	1	1
8	Netherlands Antilles	0	0	1	1
Totals (9 entries)		6	6	6	18
