= Blue Jay (dinghy) =

Sailboat class

- J

Development
- Designer: Drake Sparkman of Sparkman & Stephens
- Location: United States
- Year: 1947
- No. built: 7200
- Builders: Clark Boat Company, Lippincott Boat Works, Formula Yachts, Beaton Boat Works, McNair Boat Works, Saybrook Yacht Yard, Allen Boat Company
- Role: Sail training
- Name: Blue Jay

Boat
- Displacement: 275 lb (125 kg)
- Draft: 3.67 ft (1.12 m) with the centerboard down

Hull
- Type: Monohull
- Construction: Plywood or fiberglass
- LOA: 13.50 ft (4.11 m)
- LWL: 11.25 ft (3.43 m)
- Beam: 5.17 ft (1.58 m)

Hull appendages
- Keel: centerboard
- Rudder: transom-mounted rudder

Rig
- Rig type: Bermuda rig

Sails
- Sailplan: Fractional rigged sloop
- Mainsail area: 62 sq ft (5.8 m^{2})
- Jib/genoa area: 28 sq ft (2.6 m^{2})
- Spinnaker area: 56 sq ft (5.2 m^{2})
- Total sail area: 90.00 sq ft (8.361 m^{2})

Racing
- PHRF: 108.7

The Blue Jay is an American sailing dinghy that was designed by Drake Sparkman of Sparkman & Stephens as a trainer for the Lightning one-design racer. The Blue Jay was first built in 1947.

== Production ==
The design has been built in the United States by a number of manufacturers over the years, including the Clark Boat Company of Kent, Washington, Lippincott Boat Works, Beaton Boat Works, McNair Boat Works, Saybrook Yacht Yard and Formula Yachts of Groton, Connecticut. The current builder is the Allen Boat Company of Buffalo, New York.

The International Blue Jay Class Association owns two hull molds for the design, which were donated to the club by past builders, Formula Yacht and Saybrook Yacht Yard. These two molds have been loaned to the current manufacturer for production use.

== Design ==
When the boat was designed, a friend of the designer suggested calling it the Blue Bird, but Drake Sparkman settled on the name Blue Jay, as the class badge could then simply be a letter "J", blue in color.

The Blue Jay is a recreational sailboat, that was initially built of plywood. In the early 1960s the International Blue Jay Class Association voted to allow construction from fiberglass, although some boats, particularly amateur-built ones, have continued to be built from wood.

The design has a fractional sloop rig with aluminum spars, a raked stem, a vertical transom, a transom-hung rudder controlled by a tiller and a retractable centerboard. It displaces 275 lb (125 kg) and can be fitted with a 56 sq ft (5.2 m^{2}) spinnaker.

The boat has a draft of 3.67 ft (1.12 m) with the centerboard extended and 6 in (15 cm) with it retracted, allowing beaching or ground transportation on a trailer.

For sailing the design may be equipped with an adjustable outhaul and hiking straps.

The design has a Portsmouth Yardstick racing average handicap of 108.7 and is normally raced with a crew of two or three sailors.

== Operational history ==
Early on the boat was used in novice and youth sailing programs, but today is also used in men's and women's competitions as well.

More than 140 racing fleets were reported to have been formed by the mid-1990s, with concentrations in Florida and the Great Lakes, San Francisco and Long Island Sound.

In a 1994 review Richard Sherwood wrote that the boat, "was originally designed as a junior trainer that would allow for a spinnaker, but many boats are now owned and raced by adults. The rig is relatively short, increasing stability. In line with the original design intent, class rules require anchors, PFDs, bailing equipment, and a paddle to be carried on board while racing. Flotation is optional."

== See also ==
- List of sailing boat types
