= WindRider 10 =

WindRider 10 ('Tango')
Development
- Designer: Mark Balogh and WindRider LLC
- Year: 2002
- Name: WindRider 10 ('Tango')

Boat
- Crew: 1 adult / 250 lb (110 kg)
- Draft: 6 in (0.15 m) (rudder up); 16 in (0.41 m) (rudder down)

Hull
- Type: Open trimaran
- Hull weight: 120 lb (54 kg)
- LOA: 3.3 m (11 ft)
- Beam: 3.2 m (10 ft)

Rig
- Mast height: 5.8 m (19 ft)

Sails
- Total sail area: 4.8 m^{2} (52 sq ft)

The WindRider 10 (also WindRider Tango) is a trimaran sailboat manufactured by WindRider LLC, designed by Mark Balogh and WindRider LLC and introduced in 2002. Production had ended by 2020.

The design features an adjustable seat and a kick-up aluminium rudder. It described as "basically a ten foot sit-on-top kayak with a lot of extra buoyancy".

== See also ==
- List of multihulls
