= Sailing at the 2011 Pan American Games – Snipe =

Snipe class at the 2011 Pan American Games
- Venue: Vallarta Yacht Club
- Dates: October 17 - October 23
- Competitors: 20 from 10 nations

Medalists
| Gold medal | Alexandre do Amaral; Gabriel Borges | Brazil |
| Silver medal | Agustin Diaz; Kathleen Tocke | United States |
| Bronze medal | Pablo Defazio; Manfredo Finck | Uruguay |

The Snipe class competition of the sailing events at the 2011 Pan American Games in Guadalajara took place from October 17 to October 23 at the Vallarta Yacht Club in Puerto Vallarta, Mexico. The defending champion for the event was the Brazilian boat.

Points were assigned based on the finishing position in each race with 1 point awarded for first place, 2 points for second place, and so on. The total points were calculated from the top 9 results out of the first 10 races, where lower totals indicated better performance.In case a sailor was disqualified or did not complete a race, 8 points were automatically assigned for that particular race, as there were 7 sailors in this competition.

Following the initial races, the top 5 sailors proceeded to the final race, where placings counted double towards the final score. The sailor with the lowest total score ultimately emerged as the winner.

== Schedule ==
All times are Central Standard Time (UTC-6).

| Date | Time | Round |
|---|---|---|
| October 17, 2011 | 13:00 | 1 and 2 races |
| October 18, 2011 | 13:00 | 3 and 4 races |
| October 19, 2011 | 13:00 | 5 and 6 races |
| October 21, 2011 | 13:00 | 7 and 8 races |
| October 22, 2011 | 13:00 | 9 and 10 races |
| October 23, 2011 | 15:50 | Medal race |

== Results ==
Race M is the medal race in which only the top 5 competitors took part. Each boat can drop its lowest result provided that all ten races are completed. If less than ten races are completed all races will count. Boats cannot drop their result in the medal race.

| Rank | Athlete | Race | | | | | | | | | | | Total Points | Net Points |
| Rank | Athlete | 1 | 2 | 3 | 4 | 5 | 6 | 7 | 8 | 9 | 10 | M | Total Points | Net Points |
|---|---|---|---|---|---|---|---|---|---|---|---|---|---|---|
| 1st place, gold medalist(s) | Brazil; Alexandre do Amaral; Gabriel Borges | 5 | 1 | 4 | 3 | 3 | 1 | 3.3; RDG | 6 | 1 | (8) | 6 | 41.3 | 33.3 |
| 2nd place, silver medalist(s) | United States; Agustin Diaz; Kathleen Tocke | 2 | 4 | 1 | 2 | (7) | 5 | 2 | 1 | 5 | 4 | 8 | 41 | 34 |
| 3rd place, bronze medalist(s) | Uruguay; Pablo Defazio; Manfredo Finck | (9) | 3 | 2 | 4 | 6 | 4 | 4 | 4 | 3 | 3 | 4 | 46 | 37 |
| 4 | Puerto Rico; Raúl Ríos; Marco Teixidor | 7 | 2 | 5 | (11); DSQ | 9 | 6 | 5 | 5 | 2 | 1 | 2 | 55 | 44 |
| 5 | Chile; Pedro Robles; José López | 8 | 6 | 3 | 5 | 2 | 3 | 3 | (9) | 4 | 7 | 10 | 60 | 51 |
| 6 | Argentina; Luis Soubie; Cecilia Granucci | 4 | 7 | (9) | 9 | 5 | 2 | 9 | 2 | 6 | 2 | – | 55 | 46 |
| 7 | Cuba; Michel Leiva; Yudier Suarez | 6 | 7 RDG | 7 | 6 | 1 | (11); DSQ | 1 | 3 | 10 | 6 | – | 58 | 47 |
| 8 | Mexico; Jeronimo Cervantes; Yon Belausteguigoitia | 1 | (10) | 6 | 1 | 10 | 8 | 7 | 10 | 7 | 5 | – | 65 | 55 |
| 9 | Ecuador; Gaston Vedani; Juan Ferretti | 3 | 5 | 8 | 7 | 4 | (9) | 8 | 7 | 8 | 9 | – | 68 | 59 |
| 10 | Colombia; Dany Delgado; Andrea Ponton | (10) | 9 | 10 | 8 | 8 | 7 | 10 | 8 | 9 | 10 | – | 89 | 79 |
