= WindRider 16 =

Development
- Designer: Jim Brown
- Year: 1995
- Name: WindRider 16

Boat
- Crew: 1-3 adults
- Draft: 16 in (410 mm)

Hull
- Type: open trimaran
- Hull weight: 250 lb (110 kg)
- LOA: 16 ft 7 in (5.05 m)
- Beam: 12 ft (3.7 m)

Sails
- Total sail area: 93 sq ft (8.6 m^{2})

The WindRider 16 is a small trimaran sailboat with foot pedal steering launched by WindRider LLC in 1995 for 1-3 adults. It was designed by well known multihull sailboat designer Jim Brown. Production had ended by 2020.

== See also ==
- List of multihulls
