= Sailing at the 2010 South American Games =

- Venue: Embalse de Guatapé
- Dates: March 23–25

Sailing at the 2010 South American Games in Medellín was held from 23 to 25 March. All games were played at Embalse de Guatapé.

== Medal summary ==
=== Medal table ===
Rank	Nation	Gold	Silver	Bronze	Total
1	Argentina (ARG)	3	1	0	4
2	Brazil (BRA)	1	3	1	5
3	Chile (CHI)	1	2	2	5
4	Venezuela (VEN)	1	0	1	2
5	Colombia (COL)	0	0	1	1
5	Ecuador (ECU)	0	0	1	1
Totals (6 entries)		6	6	6	18

== Events ==
Event	Gold	Silver	Bronze
Laser class	Julio Alsogaray; Argentina	Bruno Fontes; Brazil	Matías del Solar; Chile
Laser Radial class	Cecilia Carranza; Argentina	Arantza Gumucio; Chile	Odile Ginaid; Brazil
Sunfish class	Hugolino Colmaneres; Venezuela	Andrés Ducasse Rojas; Chile	Jonathan David Martinetti Mawyin; Ecuador
Snipe class	Argentina; Luis Soubie; Cecilia Granucci	Brazil; Alexandre do Amaral; Gabriel Kieling	Colombia; Sergio Delgado; Dany Delgado
Lightning class	Chile1	Brazil	Chile2
RS:X Men class	Albert Carvalho; Brazil	Mariano Reutenann; Argentina	Daniel Flores; Venezuela
