= Raul Aguayo =

Dominican Republic sailor (born 1981)

Personal information
- Full name: Raúl Alfonso Aguayo Saladín
- Born: 9 April 1981 (age 45) Santo Domingo, Dominican Republic
- Height: 189 cm (6 ft 2 in)
- Weight: 82 kg (181 lb)

Sailing career
- Sport: Sailing
- Classes: ILCA 7, Sunfish
Medal record
Sailing
Representing Dominican Republic
Pan American Games
Bronze medal – third place	2003 Santo Domingo	Sunfish class
Central American & Caribbean Games
Silver medal – second place	2006 Cartagena	Laser class
Silver medal – second place	2010 Mayaguez	Laser class

Raúl Alfonso Aguayo Saladín (Note: In this Spanish name, the first or paternal surname is Aguayo and the second or maternal family name is Saladín.) (born 9 April 1981 in Santo Domingo) is a Dominican Republic sailor. He represented the Dominican Republic in the 2008 Summer Olympic Games in the Sailing category.
