= Mauricio Oliveira =

Brazilian sailor (born 1974)

Medal record

Sailing

Representing Brazil

Pan American Games
Silver medal – second place	2003 Santo Domingo	J/24 class
Gold medal – first place	2007 Rio de Janeiro	J/24 class
Gold medal – first place	2011 Guadalajara	J/24 class

Mauricio Santa Cruz Oliveira (born 17 October 1974 in Rio de Janeiro) is a Brazilian sailor who competed in the Summer Olympic Games, the Pan American Games, the Snipe World Championships and the J/24 World Championships.

His first success came in 1992, finishing 3rd at the Snipe Junior World Championships in Motala (Sweden) with his crew Gustavo de Arruda. Only four years later, in 1996, he became Western Hemisphere & Orient champion and the following year World Champion in San Diego, sailing with Eduardo Neves. He then changed to a multihull class, the Tornado, and attended two Olympic games, in 2000 with Henrique Pellicano, and in 2004 with Joao Carlos Jordao. Afterwards, he moved to the J/24 class, winning a silver medal at the 2003 Pan American Games, a gold medal at the 2011 Pan American Games, a gold medal at the 2007 Pan American Games and the J/24 World Championships in 2006, 2007, 2009 and 2012.

== Pan American Games ==
- 2nd place in J/24 at Santo Domingo 2003.
- 1st place in J/24 at Rio de Janeiro 2007.
- 1st place in J/24 at Puerto Vallarta 2011.

== Olympic Games ==
- 11th place in Tornado at Sydney 2000.
- 17h place in Tornado at Athens 2004.

== World championships ==
- 3rd place in Snipe at Junior World Championships in Motala 1992
- 1st place in Snipe at World Championships in San Diego 1997
- 1st place in J/24 at World Championships in Melbourne 2006
- 1st place in J/24 at World Championships in Nuevo Vallarta 2007
- 1st place in J/24 at World Championships in Annapolis 2009
- 1st place in J/24 at World Championships in Rochester 2012
