= Tubará =

- Municipality and town
- Flag Coat of arms

- Location of the municipality and town of Tubará in the Department of Atlántico.
- Coordinates: 10°52′N 74°59′W
- Country: Colombia
- Region: Caribbean
- Department: Atlántico

Government
  - Mayor: Cristian Antonio Coll Maury (Conservative Party)

Area
  - Total: 176 km^{2} (68 sq mi)

Population (Census 2018)
  - Total: 12,718
  - Density: 72.3/km^{2} (187/sq mi)
- Time zone: UTC-5 (Colombia Standard Time)
- Website: www.tubara-atlantico.gov.co/sitio.shtml

Tubará is a municipality and town in the Colombian department of Atlántico.
