= Jorge Xavier Murrieta =

Personal information
- Nationality: Mexican
- Born: November 23, 1985 (age 40)

Sailing career
- Sport: Sailing
- Club: Club Náutico Avándaro
Medal record
Sailing
Representing Mexico
Pan American Games
Bronze medal – third place	2007 Rio de Janeiro	Snipe class

Jorge Xavier Murrieta Fernández (born 23 November 1985) is a sailor from Mexico.

Murrieta is North American Champion in two different classes: J/24 and Snipe. He won the 2009 J/24 North Americans, hosted by the Club Náutico Valle de Bravo in Mexico, and the 2010 Snipe North American Championship hosted by the Ponce Yacht and Fishing Club in Puerto Rico.

== Pan American Games ==
- Bronze medal at Rio de Janeiro 2007 in the Snipe class.
