= Cláudio Biekarck =

Brazilian sailor (born 1951)

Personal information
- Born: 16 May 1951 (age 75) São Paulo, Brazil
- Height: 187 cm (6 ft 2 in)
- Weight: 84 kg (185 lb)

Sailing career
- Sport: Sailing
- Club: Yacht Club Santo Amaro
- Class(es): Finn, Lightning
Medal record
Sailing
Representing Brazil
World Championship
Silver medal – second place	2011 Búzios	Lightning
Bronze medal – third place	1983 Napoletani	Lightning
Bronze medal – third place	1993 Ilhabela	Lightning
Masters World Championship
Silver medal – second place	2017 Salinas	Lightning
Pan American Games
Gold medal – first place	1983 Caracas	Lightning
Silver medal – second place	1979 San Juan	Finn
Silver medal – second place	1995 Mar del Plata	Lightning
Silver medal – second place	1999 Winnipeg	Lightning
Silver medal – second place	2019 Lima	Lightning
Bronze medal – third place	1987 Indianapolis	Lightning
Bronze medal – third place	1991 Havana	Lightning
Bronze medal – third place	2007 Rio	Lightning
Bronze medal – third place	2011 Guadalajara	Lightning
Bronze medal – third place	2015 Toronto	Lightning

Cláudio Biekarck (born 16 May 1951) is a Brazilian former sailor. He competed at the 1972 Summer Olympics, the 1976 Summer Olympics and the 1980 Summer Olympics.

Biekarck obtained 9 medals in the Lightning class at Pan American Games: gold in Caracas 1983, silver in the Mar del Plata 1995, Winnipeg 1999 and Lima 2019 editions, and bronze in 5 editions: Indianapolis 1987, Havana 1991, Rio 2007, Guadalajara 2011 and Toronto 2015. He also won a silver medal at Finn class in San Juan 1979 There were 10 medals in 11 consecutive Pans, with the exception of 2003, when there was no Lightning class race.

At the 2011 Lightning World Championship held in Búzios, he obtained the silver medal, and, at the 1993 Lightning World Championship held in Ilhabela, he obtained the bronze medal, always with Gunnar Ficker.
