= Athletics at the 2007 Pan American Games – Women's 3000 metres steeplechase =

Women's 3,000 metres steeplechase at the Pan American Games

The women's 3000 metres steeplechase event at the 2007 Pan American Games was held on July 28.

== Results ==
Rank	Name	Nationality	Time	Notes
1st place, gold medalist(s)	Sabine Heitling	Brazil	9:51.13	GR, PB
2nd place, silver medalist(s)	Talis Apud	Mexico	9:55.43	PB
3rd place, bronze medalist(s)	Zenaide Vieira	Brazil	9:55.71	
4	Desiraye Osburn-Speer	United States	9:59.11	
5	Kristin Anderson	United States	10:08.67	
6	Ángela María Figueroa	Colombia	10:14.92	
	Rosa Godoy	Argentina	DNS	
	Faustina Huamani	Peru	DNS	
