= Gunnar Ficker =

Brazilian sailor

Personal information
- Full name: Gunnar Ficker
- Nationality: Brazil
- Born: 26 November 1954 (age 71) São Paulo, São Paulo
- Height: 1.86 m (6 ft 1 in)
- Weight: 87 kg (192 lb)

Sailing career
- Sport: Sailing
- Class: Lightning
Medal record
Sailing
Representing Brazil
World Championship
Silver medal – second place	2011 Búzios	Lightning
Bronze medal – third place	1983 Napoletani	Lightning
Bronze medal – third place	1993 Ilhabela	Lightning
Masters World Championship
Silver medal – second place	2017 Salinas	Lightning
Pan American Games
Gold medal – first place	1983 Caracas	Lightning
Silver medal – second place	1995 Mar del Plata	Lightning
Silver medal – second place	1999 Winnipeg	Lightning
Silver medal – second place	2019 Lima	Lightning
Bronze medal – third place	1987 Indianapolis	Lightning
Bronze medal – third place	1991 Havana	Lightning
Bronze medal – third place	2007 Rio	Lightning
Bronze medal – third place	2011 Guadalajara	Lightning
Bronze medal – third place	2015 Toronto	Lightning

Gunnar Ficker (born 26 November 1954) is a Brazilian sailor. He won medals in nine Pan American Games almost consecutively, between 1983 and 2015 (with the exception of 2003, when there was no Lightning class), together with Cláudio Biekarck.

== Career ==
He started sailing when he was still a boy, at the Guarapiranga dam, in São Paulo. At 17, he was already world champion in the Penguin class, alongside Joaquim Doeding. The partnership with Cláudio Biekarck began in 1978, when Gunnar was 24 years old. Since then, they have always sailed together.

Ficker obtained 9 medals in the Lightning class at Pan American Games: gold in Caracas 1983, silver in the Mar del Plata 1995, Winnipeg 1999 and Lima 2019 editions, and bronze in 5 editions: Indianapolis 1987, Havana 1991, Rio 2007, Guadalajara 2011 and Toronto 2015. There were 9 medals in 10 consecutive Pans, with the exception of 2003, when there was no Lightning class race.

At the 2011 Lightning World Championship held in Búzios, he obtained the silver medal, and, at the 1993 Lightning World Championship held in Ilhabela, he obtained the bronze medal.
