= Sailing at the 2010 Central American and Caribbean Games =

Sailing competition

- Venue: Balneario de Boqueron
- Location: Veracruz, Mexico
- Dates: 24-30 July

The sailing competition at the 2010 Central American and Caribbean Games was held in Mayagüez, Puerto Rico.

The tournament was scheduled to be held from 24–30 July at the Balneario de Boqueron in Porta del Sol.

== Medal summary ==
=== Men's events ===
Event	Gold	Silver	Bronze
Standard Laser	Juan Ignacio Maegli (GUA)	Raúl Aguayo (DOM)	Jose Ruiz (VEN)
Wind Surf	David Mier (MEX)	Daniel Flores (VEN)	Alberto Campos (MEX)

=== Women's events ===
Event	Gold	Silver	Bronze
Wind Surf	Demita Vega (MEX)	María Campos (MEX)	Beverly Gómez (JAM)
Laser Radial	Tania Elías (MEX)	Daniela Rivera (VEN)	Andrea Aldana (GUA)

=== Team events ===
Event	Gold	Silver	Bronze
Snipe	Puerto Rico	Mexico	Puerto Rico
Sunfish	Venezuela	Venezuela	Netherlands Antilles
Hobie Cat 16	Puerto Rico	Puerto Rico	Mexico
J-24	Puerto Rico	Puerto Rico	Mexico
