= Athletics at the 2007 Pan American Games – Women's marathon =

Women's marathon at the Pan American Games

The women's marathon event at the 2007 Pan American Games was held on July 22.

== Results ==
| Rank | Name | Nationality | Time | Notes |
|---|---|---|---|---|
| 1st place, gold medalist(s) | Mariela González | Cuba | 2:43:11 | |
| 2nd place, silver medalist(s) | Márcia Narloch | Brazil | 2:45:10 | |
| 3rd place, bronze medalist(s) | Sirlene Pinho | Brazil | 2:47:36 | |
| 4 | Jessica Rodríguez | Mexico | 2:48:11 | |
| 5 | Yailén García | Cuba | 2:49:52 | |
| 6 | Ruby Riativa | Colombia | 2:51:35 | |
| 7 | Christine Lundy | United States | 2:51:56 | |
| 8 | Emily Mortensen | United States | 3:02:00 | |
| | Claudia Camargo | Argentina | DNF | |
| | Yolanda Mercado | Puerto Rico | DNF | |
| | Érika Olivera | Chile | DNF | |
| | María Elena Valencia | Mexico | DNF | |
