= Alexandre Lee =

Brazilian judoka (born 1977)

Personal information
- Full name: Alexandre Dae Jin Lee
- Nationality: Brazil
- Born: 2 September 1977 (age 48) Mogi das Cruzes, São; Paulo, Brazil
- Height: 1.70 m (5 ft 7 in)
- Weight: 60 kg (132 lb)

Sport
- Sport: Judo
- Event: 60 kg
- Club: Guarulhos Judo Club
Medal record
Men's judo
Representing Brazil
Pan American Games
Bronze medal – third place	2007 Rio de Janeiro	60 kg

Alexandre Dae Jin Lee (born 2 September 1977) is a Brazilian judoka who competed in the men's extra-lightweight category. He represented his nation Brazil in the 60-kg division at the 2004 Summer Olympics, and later captured a bronze medal at the 2007 Pan American Games in Rio de Janeiro.

Lee qualified for the Brazilian squad in the men's extra-lightweight class (60 kg) at the 2004 Summer Olympics in Athens, based on the nation's entry to the top 22 for his own division in the world rankings by the International Judo Federation. He conceded with three shido penalties and succumbed to a waza-ari hold and a pacifying assault from Armenia's Armen Nazaryan during their opening match.

When his country Brazil hosted the 2007 Pan American Games in Rio de Janeiro, Lee thwarted Peruvian Juan Miguel Postigos to pick up a bronze medal in the men's 60-kg division.
