= Carlos Lourenço =

Portuguese sailor (1923–2008)

Personal information
- Nationality: Portuguese
- Born: 26 March 1923 Lisbon, Portugal
- Died: 2008 (aged 84–85)

Sport
- Sport: Sailing

Carlos Lourenço (26 March 1923 – 2008) was a Portuguese sailor. He competed at the 1948 Summer Olympics, the 1952 Summer Olympics and the 1956 Summer Olympics.
