= WindRider LLC =

United States based manufacturer

WindRider LLC was a United States manufacturer of sailing dinghy and trimaran sailboats.

In 2020 WindRider LLC stopped producing boats. The company now sells outdoor gear through their online store.

== Models ==
- WindRider 10 ('Tango')
- WindRider 16
- WindRider 17
- WindRider Rave
- WindRider Rave V
