= Bernardo Arndt =

Brazilian sailor (born 1967)

Personal information
- Born: 10 June 1967 (age 59) São Paulo, Brazil

Sport
- Sport: Sailing
Medal record
Representing Brazil
Pan American Games
Silver medal – second place	1991 Havana	470
Silver medal – second place	2011 Guadalajara	Hobie 16

Bernardo Müller Carioba Arndt (born 10 June 1967) is a Brazilian sailor. He competed at the 1988 Summer Olympics, the 1992 Summer Olympics, and the 2004 Summer Olympics.
