= Michael Kostiw =

Former CIA employee

Michael Vincent Kostiw (born 1947) is a former employee of the United States Central Intelligence Agency.

Kostiw worked as a case officer for the CIA for about ten years. In late 1981, he was caught shoplifting a package of bacon worth $2.13 from a Langley, Virginia supermarket and he was placed on administrative leave after reporting the incident to his employer. In 1982, the CIA arranged for the misdemeanor charges to be dropped when Kostiw resigned and agreed to counseling. Because of this incident he was later dubbed the "Bacon Guy" by The New York Times columnist Maureen Dowd.

After quitting the CIA, Kostiw was hired by the Latin America/West Africa division of Texaco and worked his way up to vice president for international government affairs of ChevronTexaco. In 1986 he ran for Congress in Florida's 16th congressional district. He was recommended by The Miami Herald on August 31, 1986 but lost in the Republican primary. Kostiw also worked as vice chairman of the International Republican Institute and staff director of the terrorism subcommittee of the House Permanent Select Committee on Intelligence under US Representative Porter J. Goss. In 2004 he retired as Colonel USAR after serving as Commander, Army Support Unit, National Military Joint Intelligence Center, (NMJIC) Pentagon.

When Goss became CIA director in 2004, he nominated Kostiw to be executive director of the agency, the third highest ranking position. Kostiw withdrew his nomination when the shoplifting incident was leaked to The Washington Post and instead became senior adviser to Goss. The post of executive director was filled by Dusty Foggo.

Kostiw was so well respected that Porter Goss, the director of the CIA went to Kostiw’s daughter's wedding, along with many other high-ranking CIA members.

Kostiw served as the Republican Staff Director of the Senate Committee on Armed Services for then ranking Member John McCain. He assumed this role in January 2007. He is a permanent member of the Council On Foreign Relations. He was asked by Senator Dan Coats to be his Senior Advisor while Sen Coats was the Director of National Intelligence. He did so during the duration of Senator Coats’ years as the DNI in the Trump Administration.
