= Andrea Aldana =

Guatemalan sailor (born 1989)

Personal information
- Nationality: Guatemala
- Born: 29 April 1989 (age 37) Guatemala City, Guatemala
- Height: 172 cm (5.64 ft)
- Weight: 68 kg (150 lb)

Sport
- Sport: Sailing
Medal record
Women's Sailing
Representing Guatemala
Central American and Caribbean Games
Bronze medal – third place	2010 Mayagüez	Laser Radial
- Updated on 16 September 2012

Andrea Dennise Aldana Bennett is a Guatemalan sports sailor. At the 2012 Summer Olympics, she competed in the Women's Laser Radial class, finishing in 32nd place.
