= Adriana Kostiw =

Brazilian samlor

Medal record

Women's sailing

Representing Brazil

Pan American Games
Bronze medal – third place	2007 Rio	Laser Radial

Adriana Kostiw (born 16 March 1974 in São Paulo) is a Brazilian sports sailor. At the 2012 Summer Olympics, she competed in the Women's Laser Radial class, finishing in 25th place.
