= Charleston, North Carolina =

Populated place within Palmyra Township in Halifax County, North Carolina

- Location of Charleston in North Carolina
- Coordinates: 36°00′12″N 77°37′18″W
- Country: United States
- State: North Carolina
- County: Halifax
- Elevation: 79 ft (24 m)
- Time zone: UTC-5 (EST)
  - Summer (DST): UTC-4 (EDT)
- ZIP Code: 27874
- Area code: 252
- GNIS feature ID: 1019605

Charleston is a populated place within Palmyra Township in Halifax County, North Carolina, United States. The location did not participate in the U.S. Census, so the population is not known, but the township's population was reported as 1,182 as of 1 July 2015.

The location shares the 27874 zip code with Scotland Neck.
