= Yamil Saba =

Venezuelan windsurfer (born 1975)

Personal information
- Born: 21 September 1975 (age 51) Caracas, Venezuela
- Height: 180 cm (5 ft 11 in)
- Weight: 80 kg (176 lb)

Sport
- Sport: Windsurfing
Medal record
Representing Venezuela
Pan American Games
Silver medal – second place	2007 Rio de Janeiro	Hobie 16
Central American and Caribbean Games
Silver medal – second place	2014 Veracruz	Hobie 16
Silver medal – second place	2018 Tubará	Hobie 16

Yamil Saba Fuentes (born 21 September 1975) is a Venezuelan windsurfer. He competed in the men's Mistral One Design event at the 2000 Summer Olympics.
