= Enrique Figueroa =

Puerto Rican yacht racer

Personal information
- Full name: Enrique Figueroa Suárez
- Nickname: Quique
- Nationality: Puerto Rican
- Born: February 25, 1964 (age 62) San Juan, Puerto Rico
- Spouse: Carla Malatrasi
Medal record
Sailing
Representing Puerto Rico
Pan American Games
Gold medal – first place	1999 Winnipeg	Hobie 16
Gold medal – first place	2003 Santo Domingo	Hobie 16
Bronze medal – third place	2007 Rio	Hobie 16
Gold medal – first place	2011 Guadalajara	Hobie 16
Bronze medal – third place	2015 Toronto	Hobie 16
Central American & Caribbean Games
Gold medal – first place	2006 Cartagena	Hobie 16
Gold medal – first place	2014 Veracruz	Hobie 16

Enrique Figueroa Suárez (Note: In this Spanish name, the first or paternal surname is Figueroa and the second or maternal family name is Suárez.) (born February 25, 1964), also known as "Quique Figueroa", is a Puerto Rican sailor. Figueroa is the only sailor of Puerto Rico to win four gold medals in the Central American-Caribbean Games. He has also competed at five Olympic Games, from 1988 to 2004 and in 2020. In 1999, Figueroa and his wife Carla Malatrasi won a gold medal in sailing in the Pan Am Hobie competition celebrated in Winnipeg, Manitoba, Canada. On March 3, 2003 the Senate of Puerto Rico honored Enrique Figueroa and his wife Carla Malatrasi by recognizing their achievements.

== Early years ==
He was born in San Juan, Puerto Rico, where he was raised and where he went to school receiving his primary and secondary education. He first became interested and participated in sailing when he was ten years old. In 1980, when he was sixteen, he participated in his first competition, the 3rd "Hobie 16 worlds" celebrated in St. Croix, U.S. Virgin Islands where he came in 3rd place. The following year (1981), he participated in the 6th Hobie Fourteen Worlds in Fortaleza, Brazil where he came first.

In 1984, Figueroa was in the 7th Hobie 14 Worlds celebrated in Puerto Azul, Philippines and came 3rd; in the same year, he enrolled the Universidad del Sagrado Corazon (Sacred Heart University) in San Juan, Puerto Rico, where he majored in Business Marketing.

== Competitions ==
Among the other competitions in which Figueroa has participated are:

- In 1985, Hobie 14 Worlds in Isla Verde, Puerto Rico where he won 1st place and
- In 1986, 6th Hobie 16 Worlds in Suva, Fiji where he took 2nd place.

In 1994, Figueroa won the IYRU World Sailing Championship title. He met and married Carla Malatrasi, a sportswoman from Puerto Rico who also loves sailing. In 1999, Figueroa and his wife Malatrasi won a gold medal in sailing in the Pan Am Hobie competition celebrated in Winnipeg, Canada. Figueroa competed in the 2000 Olympic Games held in Sydney, Australia without his wife. She stayed behind to give birth to the first of their two daughters, Isabella Victoria. In 2002, Figueroa and his wife came in 3rd place in the Hobie Racing-ISAF Sailing Games H-16 which took place in Marseille, France in which they went against 36 teams representing 20 nations.

On February 2, 2004, Figueroa and teammate Jorge Hernández, won the Olympic Games Rolex Regatta; they were named champions by beating twenty-nine entries in the tornado fleet. The regatta winners had their sights set on the 2004 Olympics and Partalympic Games in Athens, Greece. 503 sailors participated with a fleet of 323 boats representing 39 nations. Figueroa went to the 2004 Olympic Games and represented Puerto Rico at the Olympics for the fourth time.

== Honors and recognitions ==
On March 3, 2003 the Senate of Puerto Rico honored Enrique Figueroa and his wife Carla Malatrasi by recognizing their achievements. Figueroa has been named "Puerto Rican National Sportsman of the Year" in sailing for 10 consecutive years.

== See also ==
- List of Puerto Ricans
- Sports in Puerto Rico
