= Alberto González (sailor) =

Chilean sailor (born 1958)

Personal information
- Full name: Alberto González Mas
- Nationality: Chilean
- Born: 15 November 1958 (age 67)

Sailing career
- Sport: Sailing
- Class(es): 470, Soto 40, ILCA 7, Lightning

Alberto González Mas (born 15 November 1958) is a Chilean sailor. He competed in the 470 event at the 1984 Summer Olympics.
