= Diego González (sailor) =

Chilean sailor (born 1987)

Personal information
- Full name: Diego González Parro
- Nationality: Chile
- Born: 24 September 1987 (age 38) Santiago, Chile
- Height: 1.80 m (5 ft 11 in)
- Weight: 72 kg (159 lb)

Sailing career
- Sport: Sailing
- Club: Team VTR
- Coached by: Cristian Noe
- Class: Dinghy
Medal record
Men's sailing
Representing Chile
Pan American Games
Bronze medal – third place	2023 Santiago	Sunfish

Diego González Parro (Note: In this Spanish name, the first or paternal surname is González and the second or maternal family name is Parro.) (born 24 September 1987 in Santiago) is a Chilean sailor, who specialized in two-person dinghy (470) class. He represented Chile, along with his partner Benjamín Grez, at the 2012 Summer Olympics, and has also been training throughout most of his sporting career for Team VTR Yacht Club in his native Santiago, under his personal coach Cristian Noe. As of June 2015, Gonzalez is ranked among the top 400 sailors in the world for the two-person dinghy class by the International Sailing Federation.

Coming from a sporting pedigree, Gonzalez shared the same discipline with his father and 1984 Olympian Alberto González, one of the most successful sailors in Chile's history and a five-time world champion in the lightning class. He and his father tried unsuccessfully to compete for the 2008 Summer Olympics in Beijing, until the latter had decided to retire from sailing.

At the 2012 Summer Olympics in London, Gonzalez teamed up with his new partner and helmsman Benjamín Grez in the men's 470 class after having achieved a berth and finishing thirty-first from the World Championships in Barcelona, Spain. The Chilean duo failed to advance into the final round of the ten-race opening series, as they finished last overall with 196 net points in a fleet of twenty-seven boats.
