= Lightning (dinghy) =

Sailboat class

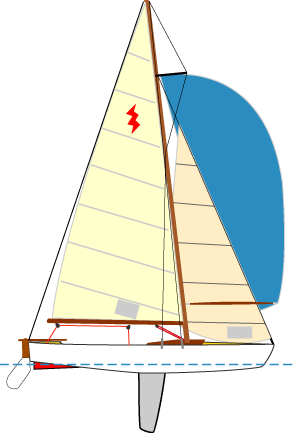

Development
- Designer: Olin Stephens
- Location: United States
- Year: 1938
- No. built: 15,550
- Builders: Clark Boat Company; Lippincott Boat Works; Nickels Boat Works; Allen Boat Company; Jack A. Helms Co. J.J. Taylor and Sons; Lockley Newport Boats; Skaneateles Boat & Canoe; Mobjack Manufacturing; Siddons & Sindle; Lofland Sail-craft; Eichenlaub Boat; WindRider LLC; Saybrook Yacht Yard
- Role: One-design racer
- Name: Lightning

Boat
- Displacement: 700 lb (318 kg)
- Draft: 4.95 ft (1.51 m) with centerboard down

Hull
- Type: monohull
- Construction: wood or fiberglass
- LOA: 19.00 ft (5.79 m)
- LWL: 15.25 ft (4.65 m)
- Beam: 6.50 ft (1.98 m)

Hull appendages
- Keel: centerboard
- Rudder: transom-mounted rudder

Rig
- Rig type: Bermuda rig
- I foretriangle height: 20.00 ft (6.10 m)
- J foretriangle base: 6.91 ft (2.11 m)
- P mainsail luff: 24.00 ft (7.32 m)
- E mainsail foot: 10.00 ft (3.05 m)

Sails
- Sailplan: fractional rigged sloop
- Mainsail area: 120.00 sq ft (11.148 m^{2})
- Jib/genoa area: 69.10 sq ft (6.420 m^{2})
- Spinnaker area: 300 sq ft (28 m^{2})
- Total sail area: 189.10 sq ft (17.568 m^{2})

Racing
- D-PN: 88.4

The Lightning is an American sailing dinghy that was designed by Olin Stephens of Sparkman & Stephens, as a one-design racer and first built in 1938.

An accepted World Sailing class, the boat is one of the most popular one-design sailing classes in the United States and is also raced in several other countries.

The design was developed into a smaller boat, as a trainer for the Lightning, the Blue Jay in 1947.

== Production ==
The design has been built by a large number of manufacturers in the United States and also in Canada. There have been 15,550 boats completed and it remains in production by the Allen Boat Company along with nickels boatworks.

In the past it has been built in the US by the Clark Boat Company, Lippincott Boat Works, Nickels Boat Works, Jack A. Helms Co., Lockley Newport Boats, Skaneateles Boat & Canoe, Mobjack Manufacturing, Siddons & Sindle, Lofland Sail-craft, the Eichenlaub Boat Co, Saybrook Yacht Yard, and WindRider LLC. It was also built in Canada by J.J. Taylor and Sons Ltd.

Boats have been delivered complete, sold as kits for amateur construction and also amateur-built from plans.

== Design ==
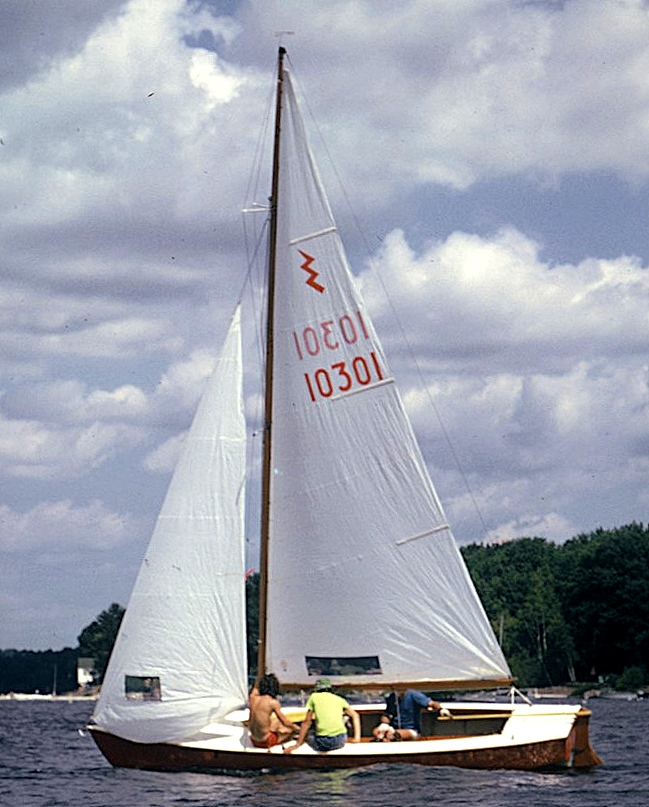
Lightning

The Lightning is a recreational sailboat, initially built with wooden plank construction and, since the early 1960s, of fiberglass with wood trim. It has a fractional sloop rig with wooden or aluminum spars. The rig employs a backstay, anchored off center, so as to not impede the tiller. If equipped with a wooden mast it has a jumper stay from the mast head to the spreaders. The hull has a foredeck, with a V-shaped coaming, a raked stem, an angled transom, a transom-hung rudder controlled by a tiller and a retractable centerboard. It displaces 700 lb (318 kg) and carries a class-prescribed maximum of 130 lb (59 kg) in centerboard weight.

The boat has a draft of 4.95 ft (1.51 m) with the centerboard extended and 5 in (13 cm) with it retracted, allowing beaching or ground transportation on a trailer.

For sailing the design is equipped with a 300 sq ft (28 m^{2}) spinnaker. Mainsail and jib windows are optional for improved visibility and safety.

The design has a Portsmouth Yardstick racing average handicap of 88.4 and is normally raced with a crew of three sailors, although it can accommodate six adults.

== Operational history ==
The boat has an active class club that regulates the design and organizes races, the International Lightning Class Association. By 1994 there were more than 460 racing fleets in Canada, Europe, South America and the United States.

In a 1994 review Richard Sherwood noted that the design has good freeboard and stability.

== See also ==
- List of sailing boat types

Related development

- Blue Jay (dinghy)
