= Chronological summary of the 2011 Pan American Games =

This article contains a chronological summary of major events from the 2011 Pan American Games in Guadalajara, Mexico.

== Calendar ==
In the following calendar for the 2011 Pan American Games, each blue box represents an event competition, such as a qualification round, on that day. The yellow boxes represent days during which medal-awarding finals for a sport are held. The number in each box represents the number of finals that will be contested on that day.

OC	Opening ceremony	●	Event competitions	1	Event finals	EG	Exhibition gala	CC	Closing ceremony

October	14th Fri	15th Sat	16th Sun	17th Mon	18th Tue	19th Wed	20th Thu	21st Fri	22nd Sat	23rd Sun	24th Mon	25th Tue	26th Wed	27th Thu	28th Fri	29th Sat	30th Sun	Events
Ceremonies	OC																CC	
Archery				●	●	●	●	2	2									4
Athletics										3	5	6	9	10	12	1	1	47
Badminton		●	●	●	●	2	3											5
Baseball						●	●	●	●		●	1						1
Basketball								●	●	●	●	1	●	●	●	●	1	2
Basque pelota								●	●	●	●	●	4	6				10
Bowling											●	2	●	2				4
Boxing								●	●	●	●	●	●		6	7		13
Canoeing													1	1	5	5		12
Cycling		2	2	3	2	2	3	2	2									18
Diving													2	2	2	2		8
Equestrian			1	●		1		●	●	2			●	1		1		6
Fencing											2	2	2	2	2	2		12
Field hockey						●	●	●	●	●	●		●	●	1	1		2
Football					●	●	●	●	●	●		●	●	1	1			2
Gymnastics		1	1	3	5						1	1	2	5	5	EG		24
Handball		●	●	●	●	●	●	●	●	1	1							2
Judo													3	4	4	3		14
Karate														2	4	4		10
Modern pentathlon		1	1															2
Racquetball				●	●	●	●	●	4	●	●	2						6
Roller skating										●	2		2	4				8
Rowing		●	●	4	5	5												14
Rugby sevens																●	1	1
Sailing				●	●	●		●	●	9								9
Shooting			2	2	2	3	1	2	3									15
Softball				●	●	●	●	●	●	1								1
Squash		●	●	4	●	●	●	2										6
Swimming		5	5	4	5	5	4	4	2									34
Synchronized swimming					●	●	1	1										2
Table tennis		●	●	2	●	●	2											4
Taekwondo		2	2	2	2													8
Tennis				●	●	●	●	3	2									5
Triathlon										2								2
Volleyball		●	●	●	●	●	1	1	1		●	●	●	●	●	1		4
Water polo										●	●	●	●	●	1	1		2
Water skiing							●	●	3	6								9
Weightlifting										3	3	3	3	3				15
Wrestling							4	3	4	4	3							18
Total events		11	14	24	21	18	19	20	23	31	17	18	28	43	43	28	3	361
Cumulative total		11	25	49	70	88	107	127	150	181	198	216	244	287	330	358	361	
October	14th Fri	15th Sat	16th Sun	17th Mon	18th Tue	19th Wed	20th Thu	21st Fri	22nd Sat	23rd Sun	24th Mon	25th Tue	26th Wed	27th Thu	28th Fri	29th Sat	30th Sun	Events

== Day 1 – October 14 (Opening ceremony) ==
Opening ceremony

- Starting at 8:00 pm CDT (UTC−6), the three-hour opening ceremony was attended by 50,000 spectators. The spectacle was directed by production company Five Currents, and the Pan American Cauldron was lit by former Mexican diver Paola Espinosa.

== Day 2 – October 15 ==
Cycling

- Heather Irmiger of the United States wins the women's cross country event in mountain biking, becoming the first gold medalist of the games. While Hector Páez of Colombia wins the men's event.

Gymnastics

- Julie Zetlin of the United States wins the first rhythmic gymnastics medal on offer in the individual all around competition.

Modern pentathlon

- Margaux Isaksen of the United States wins the gold medal in the women's individual event, as three other athletes along with Isaksen from Mexico, Canada and Argentina qualify for the 2012 Summer Olympics in London, Great Britain.

Swimming

- The United States team wins four out of the five gold medals, in the process setting one Pan American Games record. Brazil wins the only other gold medal.

Taekwondo

- Gabriel Mercedes of the Dominican Republic defends his title in the men's 58 kg event, while Ivett Gonda of Canada wins the gold medal in the women's 49 kg event.

Gold Medalists
Sport	Event	Competitor(s)	NOC	Rec	Ref
Cycling	Men's cross-country	Hector Páez	Colombia		
Cycling	Women's cross-country	Heather Irmiger	United States		
Gymnastics	Women's rhythmic individual all-around	Julie Zetlin	United States		
Modern pentathlon	Women's modern pentathlon	Margaux Isaksen	United States		
Swimming	Women's 100 metre butterfly	Claire Donahue	United States		
Swimming	Women's 400 metre individual medley	Claire Donahue	United States		
Swimming	Women's 4 × 100 metre freestyle relay	Madison Kennedy; Elizabeth Pelton; Amanda Kendall; Erika Erndl	United States	PR	
Swimming	Men's 400 metre freestyle	Charles Houchin	United States		
Swimming	Men's 400 metre individual medley	Thiago Pereira	Brazil		
Taekwondo	Women's 49 kg	Ivett Gonda	Canada		
Taekwondo	Men's 58 kg	Gabriel Mercedes	Dominican Republic		

== Day 3 – October 16 ==
Cycling

- Colombian athletes win both gold medals in the road cycling time trial events.

Equestrian

- The United States wins the gold medal in the team dressage event, successfully defending their championship for the fourth straight Pan American Games.

Gymnastics

- Brazil wins the group event by shocking favourites Canada for the title, in the process claiming its second straight title.

Modern pentathlon

- Óscar Soto of the hosts Mexico wins the gold medal in the men's individual event, as three other athletes along with Soto from Guatemala, Chile and United States qualify for the 2012 Summer Olympics in London, Great Britain.

Shooting

- Daryl Szarenszki wins the gold medal in the 10m air pistol event with a new Pan American record in the qualifications and finals. Dorothy Ludwig of Canada wins the women's event, coming back on the last shot to win by 0.1 points and qualify a spot for Canada at the 2012 Summer Olympics.

Swimming

- Brazil and the United States continue their dominance in the pool with Brazil picking up three gold medals, while the United States picking up the rest with two.

Taekwondo

- Jhohanny Jean of the Dominican Republic wins the second straight gold medal for his country the men's 68 kg event, while Irma Contreras of Mexico wins the gold medal in the women's 57 kg event.

Gold Medalists
Sport	Event	Competitor(s)	NOC	Rec	Ref
Cycling	Men's road time trial	Marlon Alirio Pérez	Colombia		
Cycling	Women's road time trial	María Luisa Calle	Colombia		
Equestrian	Team dressage	Steffen Peters; Heather Blitz; Cesar Parra; Marisa Festerling	United States		
Gymnastics	Women's rhythmic group all-around	Dayane Amaral; Debora Falda; Luisa Matsuo; Bianca Mendonça; Eliane Sampaio; Drielly Saltoe	Brazil		
Modern pentathlon	Men's individual	Óscar Soto	Mexico		
Shooting	Men's 10 metre air pistol	Daryl Szarenszki	United States	FPR	
Shooting	Women's 10 metre air pistol	Dorothy Ludwig	Canada		
Swimming	Women's 100 metre backstroke	Rachel Bootsma	United States	PR	
Swimming	Women's 200 metre freestyle	Catherine Breed	United States		
Swimming	Men's 100 metre freestyle	César Cielo	Brazil	PR	
Swimming	Men's 100 metre breaststroke	Felipe França Silva	Brazil		
Swimming	Men's 4 × 100 metre freestyle relay	César Cielo; Bruno Fratus; Nicholas Santos; Nicolas Oliviera; Gabriel Mangabeira*; Thiago Pereira*; Henrique Rodrigues*	Brazil	PR	
Taekwondo	Women's 57 kg	Irma Contreras	Mexico		
Taekwondo	Men's 68 kg	Jhohanny Jean	Dominican Republic		

- Athletes with a * competed in preliminaries only and received medals.

== Day 4 – October 17 ==
Cycling

- Colombia wins the men's team pursuit, while Venezuela sets new Pan American Records in the men's and women's team sprints

Gymnastics

- Brazil wins the 5 balls group event, while the United States and Mexico pick up one gold each.

Rowing

- Argentina wins three out of the four gold medals on offer while Cuba takes the remaining title.

Shooting

- The United States wins the gold medal in the men's (Matthew Rawlings) and women's (Emily Caruso) 10 metre air rifle events.

Squash

- Mexico wins the men's and women's singles and doubles events. Colombia wins the men's singles event.

Swimming

- Brazil and the United States continue their dominance in the pool as each win two gold medals.

Table tennis

- Brazil successfully defends the men's team title, while the Dominican Republic wins the women's team title.

Taekwondo

- Sebastián Crismanich of Argentina wins the men's 80 kg event, while Melissa Pangotta of Canada wins the women's 67 kg event.

Gold Medalists
Sport	Event	Competitor(s)	NOC	Rec	Ref
Cycling	Men's team pursuit	Juan Arango; Edwin Ávila; Arles Castro; Weimar Roldán	Colombia		
Cycling	Men's team sprint	Hersony Canelón; César Marcano; Ángel Pulgar	Venezuela	PR	
Cycling	Women's team sprint	Daniela Larreal; Mariestela Vilera	Venezuela	PR	
Gymnastics	Women's rhythmic individual ball	Julie Zetlin	United States		
Gymnastics	Women's rhythmic individual hoop	Cynthia Valdéz	Mexico		
Gymnastics	Women's rhythmic group 5 balls	Dayane Amaral; Debora Falda; Luisa Matsuo; Bianca Mendonça; Eliane Sampaio; Drielly Saltoe	Brazil		
Rowing	Women's double sculls	Maria Abalo; Maria Best	Argentina		
Rowing	Women's coxless pair	Yariulvis Cobas; Aimee Hernandez	Cuba		
Rowing	Men's double sculls	Cristian Rosso; Ariel Suarez	Argentina		
Rowing	Men's coxless four	Sebastian Fernandez; Joaquin Iwan; Rodrigo Murillo; Agustin Silvestro	Argentina		
Shooting	Men's 10 metre air rifle	Matthew Rawlings	United States	FPR	
Shooting	Women's 10 metre air rifle	Emily Caruso	United States	FPR	
Squash	Men's singles	Miguel Ángel Rodríguez	Colombia		
Squash	Men's doubles	Arturo Salazar; Eric Gálvez	Mexico		
Squash	Women's singles	Samantha Terán	Mexico		
Squash	Women's doubles	Nayelly Hernández; Samantha Terán	Mexico		
Swimming	Men's 100 metre backstroke	Thiago Pereira	Brazil		
Swimming	Men's 200 metre butterfly	Leonardo De Deus	Brazil		
Swimming	Women's 100 metre breaststroke	Ann Chandler	United States		
Swimming	Women's 400 metre freestyle	Gilligan Ryan	United States		
Table tennis	Men's team	Hugo Hoyama; Gustavo Tsuboi; Thiago Monteiro	Brazil		
Table tennis	Women's team	Wu Xue; Johenny Valdez; Eva Brito	Dominican Republic		
Taekwondo	Women's 67 kg	Melissa Pagnotta	Canada		
Taekwondo	Men's 80 kg	Sebastián Crismanich	Argentina		

== Day 5 – October 18 ==
Cycling

- Canada breaks the Pan American Games record twice en route to a gold medal performance. Lisandra Guerra of Cuba wins the women's individual sprint.

Gymnastics

- Canada wins both golds in the trampoline competition, while Brazil sweeps the gold medals in the group event as it wins the 3 ribbons + 2 hoops event. The United States and Mexico also picked up one gold medal each in the individual apparatus finals in rhythmic gymnastics, as that event came to a close.

Rowing

- United States and Mexico each pick up two gold medals while Argentina pick up the only other gold medal on offer.

Shooting

- Guatemala wins its first gold medal in the men's 50 meter pistol event, while the United States wins the women's trap.

Swimming

- Brett Fraser wins the Cayman Islands first ever Pan American Games gold medal by setting a new Pan American Games record in the men's 200 meter freestyle event. The United States wins the other four gold medals that were awarded today.

Taekwondo

- Cuba wins both events today (the men's +80 and women's +67 kg classes), as taekwondo competitions also come to a close.

Gold Medalists
Sport	Event	Competitor(s)	NOC	Rec	Ref
Cycling	Women's team pursuit	Laura Brown; Jasmin Glaesser; Stephanie Roorda	Canada	PR	
Cycling	Women's sprint	Lisandra Guerra	Cuba		
Gymnastics	Women's rhythmic individual club	Cynthia Valdéz	Mexico		
Gymnastics	Women's rhythmic individual ribbon	Julie Zetlin	United States		
Gymnastics	Women's rhythmic group 3 ribbons + 2 hoops	Dayane Amaral; Debora Falda; Luisa Matsuo; Bianca Mendonça; Eliane Sampaio; Drielly Saltoe	Brazil		
Gymnastics	Men's trampoline	Keegan Soehn	Canada		
Gymnastics	Women's trampoline	Rosannagh MacLennan	Canada		
Rowing	Women's single sculls	Margot Shumway	United States		
Rowing	Women's lightweight double sculls	Analicia Ramirez; Lila Perez Rul	Mexico		
Rowing	Men's coxless pair	Michael Gennaro; Robert Otto	United States		
Rowing	Men's quadruple sculls	Alejandro Cucchietti; Santiago Fernández; Cristian Rosso; Ariel Suarez	Argentina		
Rowing	Men's lightweight double sculls	Alan Armenta; Gerardo Sanchez	Mexico		
Shooting	Men's 50 metre pistol	Sergio Sanchez	Guatemala		
Shooting	Women's trap	Miranda Wilder	United States		
Swimming	Men's 200 metre freestyle	Brett Fraser	Cayman Islands	GR	
Swimming	Men's 200 metre breaststroke	Sean Mahoney	United States	GR	
Swimming	Men's 1500 metre freestyle	Arthur Frayler	United States		
Swimming	Women's 200 metre individual medley	Julia Smit	United States		
Swimming	Women's 4 × 200 metre freestyle relay	Catherine Breed; Elizabeth Pelton; Chelsea Nauta; Amanda Kendall; Kim Vandenberg; Erika Erndl	United States	GR	
Taekwondo	Women's +67 kg	Glenhis Hernández	Cuba		
Taekwondo	Men's +80 kg	Robelis Despaigne	Cuba		

== Day 6 – October 19 ==
Badminton

- Canada wins two gold medals, while Guatemala takes home two gold medals, as Canada tops the medal table at the start of the badminton events.

Cycling

- Juan Arango of Colombia becomes the first ever Pan American Games champion in the men's omnium, while Hersony Canelón of Venezuela wins the men's individual sprint.

Equestrian

- The United States sweeps the individual dressage medals

Rowing

- Cuba takes three of five gold medals available, after previously not taking any gold medals in rowing. Argentina and the United States take one gold each as the rowing competitions come to a close.

Shooting

- The United States, Brazil and Guatemala each win one gold medal, as the latter two set final round Pan American Games records.

Swimming

- The United States continued its dominance in the pool by winning three out of five golds, while second place Brazil wins one gold. Chile wins its first gold medal at the games in the women's 800 meters freestyle event.

Gold Medalists
Sport	Event	Competitor(s)	NOC	Rec	Ref
Badminton	Men's doubles	Howard Bach; Tony Gunawan	United States		
Badminton	Women's doubles	Alex Bruce; Michelle Li	Canada		
Cycling	Men's sprint	Hersony Canelón	Venezuela		
Cycling	Men's Omnium	Juan Arango	Colombia		
Equestrian	Individual dressage	Steffen Peters	United States		
Rowing	Women's lightweight single sculls	Jennifer Goldsack	United States		
Rowing	Women's quadruple sculls	Maria Abalo; Maria Best; Milka Kraljev; Maria Rohner	Argentina		
Rowing	Men's single sculls	Ángel Fournier	Cuba		
Rowing	Men's lightweight coxless four	Wilber Turro; Liosbel Hernandez; Liosmel Ramos; Manuel Suárez	Cuba		
Rowing	Men's eight	Jason Read; Stephen Kasprzyk; Matthew Wheeler; Joseph Spencer; Michael Gennaro; Robert Otto; Blaise Didier; Marcus McElhenney; Derek Johnson	United States		
Shooting	Men's 50 metre rifle prone	Michael McPhail	United States		
Shooting	Men's trap	Jean Pierre Brol	Guatemala	FPR	
Shooting	Women's 25 metre pistol	Ana Luiza Mello	Brazil	FPR	
Swimming	Men's 200 metre individual medley	Thiago Pereira	Brazil		
Swimming	Men's 4 × 200 metre freestyle relay	Conor Dwyer; Daniel Lawrence Madwed; Ryan Joseph Feeley; Douglas Robinson; Charles Houchin; Rexford Tullius; Robert Margallis Junior; Matthew Patton	United States		
Swimming	Women's 100 metre freestyle	Amanda Kendall	United States		
Swimming	Women's 200 metre butterfly	Kim Vandenberg	United States		
Swimming	Women's 800 metre freestyle	Kristel Kobrich	Chile		

== Day 7 – October 20 ==
Badminton

- Canada wins two gold medals, while Guatemala takes home two gold medals, as Canada tops the medal table at the conclusion of the badminton events.

Cycling

- Angie González of Venezuela becomes the first Pan American Games champion in the women's omnium. Colombia and Venezuela win one gold each more as the track cycling competition comes to a close.

Shooting

- United States wins the men's double trap event.

Swimming

- The first night of the swimming competition that the United States does not win more than one gold medal. Brazil, Venezuela and Canada win one gold each the latter two winning their first gold medals of the swimming competition.

Synchronized swimming

- Canada wins the women's duet event and qualifies to compete at the 2012 Summer Olympics in London, Great Britain.

Table tennis

- Zhang Mo of Canada and Liu Song of Argentina win the gold medal in the women's and men's individual event respectively and qualify to compete at the 2012 Summer Olympics in London, Great Britain.

Volleyball

- Brazil defeats Cuba in a thrilling five set gold medal match, and wins the first gold medal awarded in a team sport.

Wrestling

- Cuba wins all five gold medals available in Greco-Roman wrestling today.

Gold Medalists
Sport	Event	Competitor(s)	NOC	Rec	Ref
Badminton	Men's singles	Kevin Cordón	Guatemala		
Badminton	Women's singles	Michelle Li	Canada		
Badminton	Mixed doubles	Grace Gao and Toby Ng	Canada		
Cycling	Men's Keirin	Fabián Puerta	Colombia		
Cycling	Women's Keirin	Daniela Larreal	Venezuela		
Cycling	Women's Omnium	Angie González	Venezuela		
Shooting	Men's double trap	Walton Eller	United States		
Swimming	Men's 50 metre freestyle	César Cielo	Brazil	GR	
Swimming	Men's 100 metre butterfly	Albert Subitatis	Venezuela		
Swimming	Women's 200 metre backstroke	Elizabeth Pelton	United States	GR	
Swimming	Women's 200 metre breaststroke	Ashley McGregor	Canada		
Synchronized swimming	Women's duet	Élise Marcotte & Marie-Pier Boudreau Gagnon	Canada		
Table tennis	Men's singles	Liu Song	Argentina		
Table tennis	Women's singles	Zhang Mo	Canada		
Volleyball	Women's tournament	Brazil women's national volleyball team	Brazil		
Wrestling	Men's Greco-Roman 55 kg	Gustavo Balart	Cuba		
Wrestling	Men's Greco-Roman 66 kg	Pedro Mullens	Cuba		
Wrestling	Men's Greco-Roman 84 kg	Pablo Shorey	Cuba		
Wrestling	Men's Greco-Roman 120 kg	Mijaín López	Cuba		

== Day 8 – October 21 ==
Archery

- The United States and Mexico each contested the finals of both team events with the USA men and the Mexican women taking gold. The USA men set a 24 arrows Pan American record during the semifinals as well. Cuba took the bronze medal in both events.

Beach volleyball

- The Brazilian pair of Larissa França and Juliana Felisberta win the women's tournament.

Cycling

- Connor Fields of the United States wins the men's bmx event, while Mariana Pajón of Colombia wins the women's event.

Shooting

- The United States wins both gold medals on offer today.

Squash

- Canada wins the women's team event, while Mexico wins the men's team event.

Swimming

- The United States continues its dominance in the pool by winning two gold medals. Brazil, the distant runner-up also takes two gold medals.

Synchronized swimming

- Canada completes the sweep in synchronized swimming by winning the team event.

Tennis

- The United States and Argentina win the women's singles and doubles events respectively, while Ana Paula de la Penã and Santiago González of Mexico become the first Pan American Games Champion in Mixed Doubles tennis since 1995.

Wrestling

- Cuba continued its dominance in Greco-Roman wrestling by taking two out of three gold medals available (6 of 7 overall). Venezuela took the remaining gold.

Gold Medalists
Sport	Event	Competitor(s)	NOC	Rec	Ref
Archery	Men's team	United States	United States		
Archery	Women's team	Mexico	Mexico		
Beach volleyball	Women's tournament	Larissa França; Juliana Felisberta	Brazil		
Cycling	Men's BMX	Connor Fields	United States		
Cycling	Women's BMX	Mariana Pajón	Colombia		
Shooting	Men's 50 metre rifle three positions	Jason Parker	United States		
Shooting	Women's skeet	Kimberly Harryman	United States		
Squash	Men's team	Arturo Salazar; Eric Gálvez; César Salazar	Mexico		
Squash	Women's team	Miranda Ranieri; Samantha Cornett; Stephanie Edmison	Canada		
Swimming	Women's 50 metre freestyle	Lara Marie Jackson	United States		
Swimming	Women's 4 × 100 metre medley relay	Rachel Bootsma; Ann Catherine Chandler; Claire Donahue; Amanda Kendall	United States	PR	
Swimming	Men's 200 metre backstroke	Thiago Pereira	Brazil		
Swimming	Men's 4 × 100 metre medley relay	Guilherme Guido; Felipe França Silva; Gabriel Mangabeira; César Cielo	Brazil		
Synchronized swimming	Women's team	Marie-Pier Boudreau Gagnon; Jo-Annie Fortin; Chloé Isaac; Stéphanie Leclair; Tracy Little; Élise Marcotte; Karine Thomas; Valerie Welsh	Canada		
Tennis	Women's Singles	Irina Falconi	United States		
Tennis	Women's Doubles	María Irigoyen; Florencia Molinero	Argentina		
Tennis	Mixed Doubles	Ana Paula de la Peña; Santiago González	Mexico		
Wrestling	Men's Greco-Roman 60 kg	Luis Liendo	Venezuela		
Wrestling	Men's Greco-Roman 74 kg	Jorgisbell Alvarez	Cuba		
Wrestling	Men's Greco-Roman 96 kg	Yunior Estrada	Cuba		

== Day 9 – October 22 ==
Archery

- The United States men's and the Mexican women's team finished the competition by winning the singles events.

Beach volleyball

- Brazil completes the sweep of the beach volleyball gold medals.

Cycling

- Marc de Maar of the Netherlands Antilles wins the men's road race competing under the Pan American Sports Organization Flag, while Arlenis Sierra leads Cuba to a sweep in the women's road race.

Racquetball

- Mexico wins three out of four gold medals available while the United States wins the only other gold medal on offer.

Shooting

- The United States wins two gold medals, finishing the competition with ten of the fifteen gold medals available. Cuba picks up the only other gold medal won today.

Swimming

- The final events of the swimming competition were held as the open water swimming competition for men and women were held in Puerto Vallarta. Cecilia Biagioli of Argentina and Richard Weinberger of Canada win the women's and men's events respectively.

Tennis

- Robert Farah of Colombia wins the men's singles event and the doubles event with partner Juan Sebastián Cabal as the tennis events come to a close.

Water skiing

- The United States wins the first two gold medals in water skiing, while Argentina wins one gold medal. Canada wins three medals as well.

Wrestling

- Carol Huynh of Canada defends her title she won four years ago in at the 2007 Pan American Games, while Cuba continues its dominance in wrestling by winning two out of the four women's freestyle gold medals. The United States won the remaining gold medal.

Gold Medalists
Sport	Event	Competitor(s)	NOC	Rec	Ref
Archery	Men's individual	Brady Ellison	United States		
Archery	Women's individual	Alejandra Valencia	Mexico		
Beach volleyball	Men's tournament	Alison Cerutti; Emanuel Rego	Brazil		
Cycling	Men's road race	Marc de Maar	Netherlands Antilles		
Cycling	Women's road race	Arlenis Sierra	Cuba		
Racquetball	Women's singles	Paola Longoria	Mexico		
Racquetball	Women's doubles	Paola Longoria; Samantha Salas	Mexico		
Racquetball	Men's singles	Rocky Carson	United States		
Racquetball	Men's doubles	Álvaro Beltrán; Javier Moreno	Mexico		
Shooting	Men's 25 metre rapid fire pistol	Emil Milev	United States		
Shooting	Men's skeet	Vincent Hancock	United States		
Shooting	Women's 50 metre rifle three positions	Dianelys Pérez	Cuba		
Swimming	Men's marathon 10 kilometres	Richard Weinberger	Canada		
Swimming	Women's marathon 10 kilometres	Cecilia Biagioli	Argentina		
Tennis	Men's singles	Robert Farah	Colombia		
Tennis	Men's doubles	Robert Farah; Juan Sebastián Cabal	Colombia		
Water skiing	Women's overall	Regina Jaquess	United States		
Water skiing	Men's wakeboard	Andrew Adkison	United States		
Water skiing	Men's overall	Javier Julio	Argentina		
Wrestling	Women's Freestyle 48 kg	Carol Huynh	Canada		
Wrestling	Women's Freestyle 55 kg	Helen Maroulis	United States		
Wrestling	Women's Freestyle 63 kg	Katerina Vidiaux	Cuba		
Wrestling	Women's Freestyle 72 kg	Lisset Hechevarria	Cuba		

== Day 10 – October 23 ==
Athletics

Equestrian

- The United States wins the team eventing event, while Canada wins the individual eventing event. Brazil and Argentina who placed third and fourth respectively in the team event qualify a full team to compete at the 2012 Summer Olympics in London, Great Britain (the United States and Canada have already qualified).

Handball

Sailing

- All nine sailing events come to a close, with Brazil taking five gold medals, Argentina winning two, Chile and Puerto Rico winning one gold medal each.

Softball

- The United States wins its record seventh straight gold medal, while Canada takes silver and Cuba takes bronze.

Triathlon

Water skiing

Weightlifting

Wrestling

Gold Medalists
Sport	Event	Competitor(s)	NOC	Rec	Ref
Athletics	Men's 20 kilometres walk	Erick Barrondo	Guatemala		
Athletics	Women's 20 kilometres walk	Jamy Franco	Guatemala		
Athletics	Women's marathon	Adriana da Silva	Brazil		
Equestrian	Individual eventing	Jessica Phoenix	Canada		
Equestrian	Team eventing	Lynn Symansky; Hannah Burnett; Jack Pollard; Bruce Davidson Jr. Hannah Burnett	United States		
Handball	Women's tournament		Brazil		
Sailing	Women's sailboard	Patricia Freitas	Brazil		
Sailing	Women's Laser Radial class	Cecilia Saroli	Argentina		
Sailing	Men's sailboard	Ricardo Santos	Brazil		
Sailing	Men's Laser class	Julio Alsogaray	Argentina		
Sailing	Sunfish class	Matheus Dellangnello	Brazil		
Sailing	Snipe class	Alexandre do Amaral; Gabriel Borges	Brazil		
Sailing	Lightning class	Alberto González; Diego González; Cristian Herman	Chile		
Sailing	Hobie 16 class	Enrique Figueroa; Victor Aponte	Puerto Rico		
Sailing	J/24 class	Mauricio Oliveira; Alexandre de Silva; Guilherme Hamelmann; Daniel Santiago	Brazil		
Softball	Women's tournament		United States		
Triathlon	Men's individual	Reinaldo Colucci	Brazil		
Triathlon	Women's individual	Sarah Haskins	United States		
Water skiing	Women's tricks	Whitney McClintock	Canada		
Water skiing	Women's slalom	Regina Jaquess	United States		
Water skiing	Women's jump	Regina Jaquess	United States		
Water skiing	Men's tricks	Javier Julio	Argentina		
Water skiing	Men's slalom	Jonathan Travers	United States		
Water skiing	Men's jump	Frederick Krueger IV	United States		
Weightlifting	Women's 48 kg	Lely Burgos	Puerto Rico		
Weightlifting	Men's 56 kg	Sergio Álvarez	Cuba		
Weightlifting	Men's 62 kg	Óscar Figueroa	Colombia		
Wrestling	Men's Freestyle 55 kg	Juan Ramirez Beltre	Dominican Republic		
Wrestling	Men's Freestyle 66 kg	Liván López	Cuba		
Wrestling	Men's Freestyle 84 kg	Jake Herbert	United States		
Wrestling	Men's Freestyle 120 kg	Tervel Dlagnev	United States		

== Day 11 – October 24 ==
Athletics

Fencing

Gymnastics

Handball

Roller skating

Weightlifting

Wrestling

Gold Medalists
Sport	Event	Competitor(s)	NOC	Rec	Ref
Athletics	Men's 5.000 metres	Juan Luis Barrios	Mexico		
Athletics	Men's discus throw	Jorge Fernández	Cuba		
Athletics	Women's 10,000 metres	Marisol Romero	Mexico		
Athletics	Women's hammer throw	Yipsi Moreno	Cuba	PR	
Athletics	Women's pole vault	Yarisley Silva	Cuba	PR	
Fencing	Women's individual foil	Lee Kiefer	United States		
Fencing	Men's individual épée	Weston Kelsey	United States		
Gymnastics	Women's artistic team all-around	Bridgette Caquatto; Jessie DeZiel; Brandie Jay; Shawn Johnson; Grace McLaughlin; Bridget Sloan	United States		
Handball	Men's tournament		Argentina		
Roller skating	Men's free skating	Marcel Sturmer	Brazil		
Roller skating	Women's free skating	Elizabeth Soler	Argentina		
Weightlifting	Women's 53 kg	Yuderquis Contreras	Dominican Republic		
Weightlifting	Women's 58 kg	Maria Escobar	Ecuador		
Weightlifting	Men's 69 kg	Israel Rubio	Venezuela		
Wrestling	Men's Freestyle 60 kg	Luis Liendo	Venezuela		
Wrestling	Men's Freestyle 74 kg	Jorgisbell Alvarez	Cuba		
Wrestling	Men's Freestyle 96 kg	Yunior Estrada	Cuba		

== Day 12 – October 25 ==
Athletics

Baseball

Basketball

Bowling

Fencing

Gymnastics

Racquetball

Weightlifting

Gold Medalists
Sport	Event	Competitor(s)	NOC	Rec	Ref
Athletics	Women's 100 metres	Rosângela Santos	Brazil		
Athletics	Women's 800 metres	Adriana Muñoz	Cuba		
Athletics	Men's 100 metres	Lerone Clarke	Jamaica		
Athletics	Men's long jump	Daniel Pineda	Chile		
Athletics	Men's shot put	Dylan Armstrong	Canada	PR	
Athletics	Men's decathlon	Leonel Suárez	Cuba		
Baseball	Men's tournament	Andrew Albers, Cole Armstrong, Chris Bisson, Shawn Bowman; Nick Bucci, Michael Crouse, Emerson Frostad, Mark Hardy; Jimmy Henderson, Shawn Hill, Jay Johnson, Mike Johnson; Chris Kissock, Brock Kjeldgaard, Marcus Knecht, Kyle Lotzkar; Jonathan MaloDustin Molleken, Scott Richmond, Chris Robinson; Jamie Romak, Tim Smith, Skyler Stromsmoe, Jimmy Van Ostrand	Canada		
Basketball	Women's tournament	Angelica Bermudez, Carla Cortijo, Carla Escalera, Michelle Gonzalez; Yolanda Jones, Angiely Morales, Michelle Pacheco, Mari Placido; Pamela Rosado, Jazmine Sepulveda, Cynthia Valentin, Esmary Vargas	Puerto Rico		
Bowling	Women's pairs	Liz Johnson; Kelly Kulick	United States		
Bowling	Men's pairs	Bill O'Neill; Chris Barnes	United States		
Fencing	Women's individual sabre	Mariel Zagunis	United States		
Fencing	Men's individual foil	Alexander Massialas	United States		
Racquetball	Men's team	Álvaro Beltrán; Gilberto Mejia; Javier Moreno	Mexico		
Racquetball	Women's team	Paola Longoria; Samantha Salas	Mexico		
Weightlifting	Women's 63 kg	Christine Girard	Canada	PR	
Weightlifting	Men's 77 kg	Iván Cambar	Cuba		
Weightlifting	Men's 85 kg	Yoelmis Hernández	Cuba		

== Day 13 – October 26 ==
Athletics

Basque pelota

Canoeing

Diving

Fencing

Gymnastics

Judo

Roller skating

Weightlifting

Gold Medalists
Sport	Event	Competitor(s)	NOC	Rec	Ref
Athletics	Women's 100 metres hurdles	Yvette Lewis	United States		
Athletics	Women's 400 metres hurdles	Princesa Oliveros	Colombia		
Athletics	Women's 400 metres	Jennifer Padilla	Colombia		
Athletics	Women's long jump	Maurren Maggi	Brazil		
Athletics	Women's high jump	Lesyani Mayor	Cuba		
Athletics	Women's heptathlon	Lucimara da Silva	Brazil		
Athletics	Men's 400 metres	Néry Brenes	Costa Rica		
Athletics	Men's 1500 metres	Leandro de Oliveira	Brazil		
Athletics	Men's hammer throw	Kibwe Johnson	United States	PR	
Basque pelota	Men's Paleta Rubber Pairs Trinkete	Facundo Andreasen; Sergio Villegas	Argentina		
Basque pelota	Men's Paleta Leather Pairs 36m Fronton	Rafael Fernández; Azuan Perez	Cuba		
Basque pelota	Men's Paleta Leather Pairs Trinkete	Cristian Andrés Algarbe; Jorge Villegas	Argentina		
Basque pelota	Men's Paleta Rubber Pairs 30m Fronton	Fernando Gabriel Ergueta; Javier Alejandro Nicosia	Argentina		
Canoeing	Women's K-4 500 metres	Kathleen Fraser; Kristin Gauthier; Alexa Irvin; Una Lounder	Canada		
Diving	Women's 10 metre platform	Paola Espinosa	Mexico		
Diving	Men's synchronized 3 metre springboard	Yahel Castillo; Julian Sánchez	Mexico		
Fencing	Women's individual épée	Kelly Hurley	United States		
Fencing	Men's individual sabre	Philippe Beaudry	Canada		
Judo	Women's +78 kg	Idalys Ortiz	Cuba		
Judo	Men's 100 kg	Luciano Corrêa	Brazil		
Judo	Men's +100 kg	Óscar Brayson	Cuba		
Weightlifting	Women's 69 kg	Mercedes Pérez	Colombia		
Weightlifting	Women's 75 kg	Ubaldina Valoyes	Colombia		
Weightlifting	Men's 94 kg	Javier Venega	Cuba		

== Day 14 – October 27 ==
Athletics

Basque pelota

Bowling

Canoeing

Diving

Equestrian

Fencing

Football

Gymnastics

Judo

Karate

Roller skating

Weightlifting

Gold Medalists
Sport	Event	Competitor(s)	NOC	Rec	Ref
Athletics	Men's 200 metres	Roberto Skyers	Cuba		
Athletics	Men's 400 metres hurdles	Omar Cisneros	Cuba	PR	
Athletics	Men's 10,000 metres	Marilson Santos	Brazil		
Athletics	Men's high jump	Donald Thomas	Bahamas		
Athletics	Men's triple jump	Alexis Copello	Cuba		
Athletics	Women's 200 metres	Ana Cláudia Silva	Brazil		
Athletics	Women's 1500 metres	Adriana Muñoz	Cuba		
Athletics	Women's 5,000 metres	Marisol Romero	Mexico		
Athletics	Women's shot put	Misleydis González	Cuba		
Athletics	Women's javelin throw	Alicia DeShasier	United States		
Basque pelota	Women's Paleta Rubber Pairs Trinkete	María Lis García; María Lis García	Argentina		
Basque pelota	Women's Frontenis Pairs 30m Fronton	Paulina Castillo; Guadalupe Maria Hernandez	Mexico		
Basque pelota	Men's Mano Singles Trinkete	Heriberto López	Mexico		
Basque pelota	Men's Mano Doubles 36m Fronton	Jorge Alberto Alcantara; Orlando Diaz	Mexico		
Basque pelota	Men's Mano Singles 36m Fronton	Fernando Medina	Mexico		
Basque pelota	Men's Frontenis Pairs 30m Fronton	Alberto Miguel Rodriguez; Arturo Rodríguez	Mexico		
Bowling	Men's individual	Santiago Mejía	Colombia		
Bowling	Women's individual	Elizabeth Johnson	United States		
Canoeing	Men's K-4 1000 metres	Osvaldo Labrada; Jorge Antonio Garcia; Reinier Torres; Maikel Daniel Zulueta	Cuba		
Diving	Men's 3 metre springboard	Yahel Castillo	Mexico		
Diving	Women's synchronized 10 metre platform	Paola Espinosa; Tatiana Ortiz	Mexico		
Equestrian	Team jumping	Kent Farrington on Uceko; Beezie Madden on Coral Reef Via Volo; Christine McCrea on Romantovich Take One; McLain Ward on Antares F	United States		
Fencing	Men's team épée	Soren Thompson; Weston Kelsey; Cody Mattern; Gerek Meinhardt	United States		
Fencing	Women's team foil	Lee Kiefer; Nzingha Prescod; Doris Willette; Ibtihaj Muhammad	United States		
Football	Women's tournament	Rachelle Beanlands, Melanie Booth, Candace Chapman; Robyn Gayle, Christina Julien, Kaylyn Kyle; Karina LeBlanc, Vanessa Legault-Cordisco, Diana Matheson; Kelly Parker, Sophie Schmidt, Desiree Scott; Lauren Sesselmann, Diamond Simpson, Christine Sinclair; Brittany Timko, Rhian Wilkinson, Shannon Woeller	Canada		
Gymnastics	Men's floor	Diego Hypólito	Brazil		
Gymnastics	Men's pommel horse	Daniel Corral	Mexico		
Gymnastics	Men's rings	Brandon Wynn	United States		
Gymnastics	Women's uneven bars	Bridgette Caquatto	United States		
Gymnastics	Women's vault	Brandie Jay	United States		
Judo	Women's 70 kg	Onix Cortés	Cuba		
Judo	Women's 78 kg	Kayla Harrison	United States		
Judo	Men's 81 kg	Leandro Guilheiro	Brazil		
Judo	Men's 90 kg	Tiago Camilo	Brazil		
Karate	Men's +84 kg	Angel Aponte	Venezuela		
Karate	Women's +68 kg	Maria Castellanos	Guatemala		
Roller skating	Men's 1,000 metres	Pedro Causil	Colombia		
Roller skating	Men's 10,000 metres	Jorge Bolaños	Ecuador		
Roller skating	Women's 1,000 metres	Yersy Puello	Colombia		
Roller skating	Women's 10,000 metres	Kelly Martínez	Colombia		
Weightlifting	Women's +75 kg	Olivia Nieve	Ecuador		
Weightlifting	Men's 105 kg	Jorge Arroyo	Ecuador		
Weightlifting	Men's +105 kg	Fernando Reis	Brazil		

== Day 15 – October 28 ==
Athletics

Boxing

Canoeing

Diving

Fencing

Field hockey

Football

Gymnastics

Judo

Karate

Water polo

Gold Medalists
Sport	Event	Competitor(s)	NOC	Rec	Ref
Athletics	Women's 3000 metres steeplechase	Sara Hall	United States		
Athletics	Women's 4 × 100 metres relay	Ana Cláudia Silva; Vanda Gomes; Franciela Krasucki; Rosângela Gomes	Brazil		
Athletics	Women's 4 × 400 metres relay	Aymée Martínez; Diosmely Peña; Susana Clement; Daisurami Bonne	Cuba	AR	
Athletics	Women's discus throw	Yarelys Barrios	Cuba	GR	
Athletics	Women's triple jump	Caterine Ibargüen	Colombia	GR	
Athletics	Men's 110 metres hurdles	Dayron Robles	Cuba	GR	
Athletics	Men's 800 metres	Andy González	Cuba		
Athletics	Men's 3000 metres steeplechase	José Peña	Venezuela		
Athletics	Men's 4 × 100 metres relay	Ailson Feitosa; Sandro Viana; Nilson André; Bruno de Barros	Brazil	GR	
Athletics	Men's 4 × 400 metres relay	Noel Ruíz; Raidel Acea; Omar Cisneros; William Collazo	Cuba		
Athletics	Men's javelin throw	Guillermo Martínez	Cuba	GR	
Athletics	Men's pole vault	Lázaro Borges	Cuba	GR	
Boxing	Men's Light flyweight	Joselito Velázquez	Mexico		
Boxing	Men's Bantamweight	Lázaro Álvarez	Cuba		
Boxing	Men's Light welterweight	Roniel Iglesias	Cuba		
Boxing	Men's Middleweight	Emilio Correa	Cuba		
Boxing	Men's Heavyweight	Lenier Pero	Cuba		
Boxing	Women's Flyweight	Mandy Bujold	Canada		
Canoeing	Men's K-1 1000 metres	Jorge Antonio García	Cuba		
Canoeing	Men's C-1 1000 metres	Everardo Cristóbal	Mexico		
Canoeing	Men's K-2 1000 metres	Steven Jorens; Richard Dessureault-Dober	Canada		
Canoeing	Men's C-2 1000 metres	Karel Aguilar Chacón; Serguey Torres	Cuba		
Canoeing	Women's K-1 500 metres	Carrie Johnson	United States		
Canoeing	Women's K-2 500 metres	Dayexi Gandarela; Yulitza Meneses	Cuba		
Diving	Men's synchronized 10 metre platform	Iván García; German Sanchez	Mexico		
Diving	Women's 3 metre springboard	Laura Sánchez	Mexico		
Fencing	Men's team foil	Miles Chamley-Watson; Alexander Massialas; Gerek Meinhardt	United States		
Fencing	Women's team sabre	Ibtihaj Muhammad; Mariel Zagunis; Dagmara Wozniak; Lindsay Campbell	United States		
Field hockey	Women's tournament	Kayla Bashore-Smedley; Michelle Cesan; Lauren Crandall; Rachel Dawson; Katelyn Falgowski; Melissa Gonzalez; Michelle Kasold; Claire Laubach; Caroline Nichols; Katie O'Donnell; Julia Reinprecht; Katie Reinprecht; Paige Selenski; Amy Swensen; Shannon Taylor; Michelle Vittese	United States		
Football	Men's tournament	José de Jesús Corona; Hugo Isaác Rodríguez; Hiram Mier; Néstor Araujo; Dárvin Chávez; Jesús Zavala; Javier Aquino; Carlos Emilio Orrantía; Oribe Peralta; Othoniel Arce; Jerónimo Amione; José Antonio Rodríguez; Ricardo Bocanegra; Jorge Enríquez; César Ibáñez; Miguel Ángel Ponce; Isaác Brizuela; Diego Reyes	Mexico		
Gymnastics	Men's horizontal bar	Paul Ruggeri	United States		
Gymnastics	Men's parallel bars	Daniel Corral	Mexico		
Gymnastics	Men's vault	Diego Hypólito	Brazil		
Gymnastics	Women's balance beam	Ana Sofía Gómez	Guatemala		
Gymnastics	Women's floor	Ana Lago	Mexico		
Judo	Women's 57 kg	Yurisleidy Lupetey	Cuba		
Judo	Women's 63 kg	Yaritza Abel	Cuba		
Judo	Men's 66 kg	Leandro Da Cunha	Brazil		
Judo	Men's 73 kg	Bruno Silva	Brazil		
Karate	Men's 60 kg	Daniel Viveros	Ecuador		
Karate	Men's 84 kg	Cesar Herrera	Venezuela		
Karate	Women's 50 kg	Ana Villanueva	Dominican Republic		
Karate	Women's 68 kg	Lucelia Ribeiro	Brazil		
Water polo	Women's tournament	Elizabeth Armstrong; Heather Petri; Melissa Seidemann; Brenda Villa; Lauren Wenger; Margaret Steffens; Courtney Mathewson; Jessica Steffens; Elsie Windes; Kelly Rulon; Annika Dries; Kami Craig; Tumuaialii Anae	United States		

== Day 16 – October 29 ==
Athletics

Boxing

Canoeing

Diving

Equestrian

Fencing

Field hockey

Judo

Karate

Volleyball

Water polo

Gold medalists
Sport	Event	Competitor(s)	NOC	Rec	Ref
Athletics	Men's 50 kilometres walk	Horacio Nava	Mexico		
Boxing	Men's flyweight	Robeisy Ramírez	Cuba		
Boxing	Men's lightweight	Yasniel Toledo	Cuba		
Boxing	Men's welterweight	Carlos Banteux	Cuba		
Boxing	Men's light heavyweight	Julio La Cruz	Cuba		
Boxing	Men's super heavyweight	Ítalo Perea	Mexico		
Boxing	Women's light welterweight	Kiria Tapia	Puerto Rico		
Boxing	Women's light heavyweight	Mary Spencer	Canada		
Canoeing	Men's K-1 200 metres	Cesar De Cesare	Ecuador		
Canoeing	Men's C-1 200 metres	Richard Dalton	Canada		
Canoeing	Men's K-2 200 metres	Ryan Cochrane; Hugues Fournel	Canada		
Canoeing	Women's K-1 200 metres	Carrie Johnson	United States		
Diving	Men's synchronized 10 metre platform	Iván García; Germán Sánchez	Mexico		
Diving	Women's 3 metre springboard	Laura Sánchez	Mexico		
Equestrian	Individual jumping	Christine McCrea	United States		
Fencing	Men's team sabre	Benjamin Igoe; Timothy Morehouse; James Williams	United States		
Fencing	Women's team épée	Lindsay Campbell; Courtney Hurley; Kelley Hurley	United States		
Field hockey	Men's tournament	Juan Manuel Vivaldi; Ignacio Bergner; Matías Vila; Pedro Ibarra; Lucas Argento; Lucas Rey; Rodrigo Vila; Matías Paredes; Lucas Cammareri; Lucas Vila; Fernando Zylberberg; Juan Martín Lopez; Manuel Brunet; Federico Bermejillo; Agustín Mazzilli; Lucas Rossi	Argentina		
Judo	Women's 48 kg	Paula Pareto	Argentina		
Judo	Women's 52 kg	Yanet Bermoy	Cuba		
Judo	Men's 60 kg	Felipe Kitadai	Brazil		
Karate	Men's 67 kg	Daniel Viveros	Ecuador		
Karate	Men's 75 kg	Dionicio Gustavo	Dominican Republic		
Karate	Women's 55 kg	Shannon Nishi	United States		
Karate	Women's 61 kg	Bertha Gutierrez	Mexico		
Volleyball	Men's tournament	Thiago Alves; Mauricio Borges; Eder Carbonera; Mario Da Silva; Mauricio De Souza; Wallace De Souza; Gustavo Endres; Luiz Fonteles; Wallace Martins; Murilo Radke; Bruno Rezende; Renato Russomanno	Brazil		
Water polo	Men's tournament	Merrill Moses; Peter Varellas; Peter Hudnut; Ryan Bailey; Tony Azevedo; Jeff Powers; Layne Beaubien; Adam Wright; Tim Hutten; Jesse Smith; Brian Alexander; J. W. Krumpholz; Chay Lapin	United States		

== Day 17 – October 30 ==
Athletics

Basketball

Rugby sevens

Closing ceremony

Gold Medalists
Sport	Event	Competitor(s)	NOC	Rec	Ref
Athletics	Men's marathon	Solonei da Silva	Brazil		
Basketball	Men's tournament	Renaldo Balkman, José Juan Barea, Carlos Arroyo; Filiberto Rivera, Carlos Strong, Samuel Villegas; Miguel "Ali" Berdiel, Edwin Ubiles, Gabriel Colón; Luis Villafañe, Manuel Narvaez, Daniel Santiago	Puerto Rico		
Rugby sevens	Men's tournament	Nanyak Dala, Sean Duke, Matt Evans; Sean White, Ciaran Hearn, Nathan Hirayama; Tyler Ardon, Phil Mack, John Moonlight; Taylor Paris, Mike Scholz, Conor Trainor	Canada		
