= Puerto Rico at the 2011 Pan American Games =

- IOC code: PUR
- NOC: Puerto Rico Olympic Committee

in Guadalajara 14–30 October 2011
- Competitors: 250 in 30 sports
- Flag bearer: Luis Rivera
- Medals Ranked 12th: Gold 6 Silver 8 Bronze 8 Total 22

Pan American Games appearances (overview)
- 1951; 1955; 1959; 1963; 1967; 1971; 1975; 1979; 1983; 1987; 1991; 1995; 1999; 2003; 2007; 2011; 2015; 2019; 2023; 2027

Puerto Rico competed at the 2011 Pan American Games in Guadalajara, Mexico from 14 to 30 October 2011. The nation sent 250 athletes competing in 30 sports. This was Puerto Rico's most successful appearance at the Pan American Games, increasing its previous best of three gold medals to six at this edition.

== Medalists ==
Medals by sport
Sport	1st place, gold medalist(s)	2nd place, silver medalist(s)	3rd place, bronze medalist(s)	Total
Basketball	2	0	0	2
Wrestling	1	1	0	2
Boxing	1	0	3	4
Sailing	1	0	0	1
Weightlifting	1	0	0	1
Gymnastic	0	2	2	4
Judo	0	2	2	4
Taekwondo	0	1	0	1
Shooting	0	1	0	1
Tennis	0	1	0	1
Beach Volleyball	0	0	1	1
Total	6	8	8	22

Medal	Name	Sport	Event	Date
Gold	Enrique Figueroa; Victor Aponte	Sailing	Hobie 16 open class	October 23
Gold	Lely Berlitt Burgos	Weightlifting	Women's 48 kg	October 23
Gold	Franklin Gómez	Wrestling	Men's freestyle 60 kg	October 24
Gold	Puerto Rico women's national basketball team	Basketball	Women	October 25
Gold	Puerto Rico men's national basketball team	Basketball	Men	October 30
Gold	Kiria Tapia	Boxing	Women's light welterweight 60 kg	October 29
Silver	Nikki Martinez	Taekwondo	Women's +67 kg	October 18
Silver	José Torres	Shooting	Men's double trap	October 20
Silver	Monica Puig	Tennis	Women's singles	October 21
Silver	Pedro Soto	Wrestling	Men's freestyle 66 kg	October 23
Silver	Rafael Morales; Angel Ramos; Tommy Ramos; Luis Rivera; Alexander Rodriguez; Luis Vargas	Gymnastics	Men's artistic team all-around	October 25
Silver	Melissa Mojica	Judo	Women's +78 kg	October 26
Silver	Gadiel Miranda	Judo	Men's 81 kg	October 27
Silver	Luis Vargas	Gymnastics	Men's parallel bars	October 28
Bronze	Yarleen Santiago; Yamileska Yantin	Beach volleyball	Women	October 21
Bronze	Jantony Ortíz	Boxing	Men's Light flyweight 49 kg	October 25
Bronze	Angel Suarez	Boxing	Men's Lightweight 60 kg	October 26
Bronze	Gerardo Bisbal	Boxing	Men's Super heavyweight +91 kg	October 26
Bronze	Pablo Figueroa	Judo	Men's +100 kg	October 26
Bronze	Alexander Rodriguez	Gymnastics	Men's floor exercise	October 27
Bronze	Maria Perez	Judo	Women's 70 kg	October 27
Bronze	Angel Ramos	Gymnastics	Men's horizontal bar	October 28

== Archery ==
Puerto Rico qualified one male and three female athletes for the archery competition.

Men

Athlete	Event	Ranking Round		Round of 32	Round of 16	Quarterfinals	Semifinals	Final
Athlete	Event	Score	Seed	Opposition Score	Opposition Score	Opposition Score	Opposition Score	Opposition Score
Nolan Cintron	Men's individual	1259	19th	Hugo Franco (CUB); L 2-6	Did not advance			

Women

Athlete	Event	Ranking Round		Round of 32	Round of 16	Quarterfinals	Semifinals	Final
Athlete	Event	Score	Seed	Opposition Score	Opposition Score	Opposition Score	Opposition Score	Opposition Score
Nady Ruiz	Women's individual	1259	15th	Ximena Mendiberry (ARG); W 6–0	Miranda Leek (USA); L 1-7	Did not advance		
Maria Cardoza	Women's individual	1232	21st	Maydenia Sarduy (CUB); W 6–4	Leidys Brito (VEN); L 1-7	Did not advance		
Ambar Reyes	Women's individual	1158	32nd	Alejandra Valencia (MEX); L 0-6	Did not advance			
Maria Cardoza; Ambar Reyes; Nady Ruiz	Women's team	3649	8th		Colombia; L 194-212	Did not advance		

== Athletics ==
=== Men ===
Track and road events

Event	Athletes	Heats		Semifinal		Final	
Event	Athletes	Time	Rank	Time	Rank	Time	Rank
100 m	Miguel Lopez	10.48	4th	Did not advance			
1500 m	Samuel Alexis Vazquez					3:56.65	9th
110 m hurdles	Héctor Cotto			13.69	4th q	13.49 PB	5th
110 m hurdles	Enrique Llanos			13.70	4th q	13.52 PB	6th
400 m hurdles	Eric Alejandro			51.28	4th	Did not advance	
3000 m steeplechase	Alexander Greaux					DNS	
Marathon	Luis Rivera					2:19:06 SB	4th
4 × 100 m relay	Marcos Amalbert; Carlos Rodriguez; Marquis Holston; Miguel Lopez			DNF		Did not advance	

Field events

Event	Athletes	Semifinal		Final	
Event	Athletes	Result	Rank	Result	Rank
Long jump	Marcos Amalbert	7.71 m.	8th	7.31 m.	11th
Discus throw	Alfredo Romero			47.97 m.	12th
Javelin throw	Felipe S. Ortiz			67.93 m.	11th

Combined events

Decathlon	Event	Steven Marrero			Marcos E. Sanchez		
Decathlon	Event	Results	Points	Rank	Results	Points	Rank
	100 m	11.57	738	13th	11.04	852	9th
	Long jump	6.63 m.	727	12th	7.04 m.	823	9th
	Shot put	13.05 m.	670	11th	13.29 m. PB	685	9th
	High jump	1.87 m. PB	687	9th	1.96 m.	767	6th
	400 m	51.19 PB	761	11th	49.37 PB	844	6th
	110 m hurdles	DNF			DNF		
	Discus throw	46.10 m. PB	790	2nd	DNS		
	Pole vault	NM			DNS		
	Javelin throw	56.51 m. PB	685	6th	DNS		
	1500 m	DNF			DNS		
Final			5058	12th		DNF	

=== Women ===
Track and road events

Event	Athletes	Semifinal		Final	
Event	Athletes	Time	Rank	Time	Rank
1500 m	Beverly Ramos			4:34.90	12th
3000 m steeplechase	Beverly Ramos			DNF	
Marathon	Maria del Pilar Diaz			3:15:17	14th

Field events

Event	Athletes	Semifinal		Final	
Event	Athletes	Result	Rank	Result	Rank
Pole vault	Andrea Zambrana			NM	
Discus throw	Brittni Borrero			46.87 m.	11th
Javelin throw	Yanet Cruz			52.81 m.	5th

== Badminton ==
Puerto Rico qualified one male and one female athletes for the badminton competition.

Men

Athlete	Event	First round	Second round	Third round	Quarterfinals	Semifinals	Final
Athlete	Event	Opposition Result	Opposition Result	Opposition Result	Opposition Result	Opposition Result	Opposition Result
Valetine Bryan	Men's singles		Sattawat Pongnairat (USA); L 12–21, 12-21	Did not advance			

Women

Athlete	Event	First round	Second round	Third round	Quarterfinals	Semifinals	Final
Athlete	Event	Opposition Result	Opposition Result	Opposition Result	Opposition Result	Opposition Result	Opposition Result
Santana Daneysha	Women's singles		Tingting Chou (CHI); W 21–14, 21–14	Joycelyn Ko (CAN); L 9–21, 7–21	Did not advance		

Mixed

Athlete	Event	First round	Second round	Quarterfinals	Semifinals	Final	Rank
Athlete	Event	Opposition Result	Opposition Result	Opposition Result	Opposition Result	Opposition Result	Rank
Bryan Valentin; Santana Daneysha	Mixed doubles	Alberto Raposo (DOM); Cabrera Orosameli (DOM); W 22–24, 21–19, 21–12	Osleni Guerrero (CUB); Maria Hernandez (CUB); L 19–21, 9–21	Did not advance			

== Baseball ==
Puerto Rico qualified a baseball team of twenty athletes to participate.

Team

- Hiram Bocachica
- Antonio Candelaria
- César Crespo
- José De La Torre
- Juan Díaz
- Jeffry Dominguez
- Jesús Feliciano
- Luis Figueroa
- Adalberto Flores
- Nelvin Fuentes
- Reymond Fuentes
- Iván Maldonado
- Miguel Mejías
- Efrain Nieves
- Wilberto Ortiz
- Juan Miguel Padilla
- Julio Rodríguez
- Andrès Santiago
- Tomás Santiago
- Neftalí Soto
- Yariel Soto
- Joseph Torres
- José Valentín
- Christian Vázquez

Standings

Pos	Team	W	L	RF	RA	RD	PCT	GB	Qualification
1	Cuba	3	0	22	16	+6	1.000	—	Advance to Semifinals
2	Canada	2	1	14	14	0	.667	1	Advance to Semifinals
3	Venezuela	1	2	14	15	−1	.333	2	
4	Puerto Rico	0	3	17	22	−5	.000	3	

Results

October 19, 2011; 10:00	Canada	5–4	Puerto Rico	Pan American Baseball Stadium, Lagos de Moreno
October 19, 2011; 10:00		Boxscore		Pan American Baseball Stadium, Lagos de Moreno

October 20, 2011; 10:00	Venezuela	9–6	Puerto Rico	Pan American Baseball Stadium, Lagos de Moreno
October 20, 2011; 10:00		Boxscore		Pan American Baseball Stadium, Lagos de Moreno

October 21, 2011; 14:00	Puerto Rico	7 – 8	Cuba	Pan American Baseball Stadium, Lagos de Moreno
October 21, 2011; 14:00		Boxscore		Pan American Baseball Stadium, Lagos de Moreno

Seventh place match

October 24, 2011; 10:00	Puerto Rico	3 – 2	Panama	Pan American Baseball Stadium, Lagos de Moreno
October 24, 2011; 10:00		Boxscore		Pan American Baseball Stadium, Lagos de Moreno

2011 Pan American Games 7th

Puerto Rico

== Basketball ==
Men

Team

- Carlos Arroyo
- Renaldo Balkman
- José Juan Barea
- Miguel Berdiel
- Gabriel Colon
- Manuel De Jesus
- Manuel Narvaez
- Filiberto Rivera
- Daniel Santiago
- Carlos Strong
- Edwin Ubiles
- Luis Villafañe

Standings

Pos	Team	Pld	W	L	PF	PA	PD	Pts	Qualification
1	Puerto Rico	3	2	1	231	206	+25	5 (Note: Puerto Rico 73–69 Mexico)	Advance to Semifinals
2	Mexico (H)	3	2	1	231	194	+37	5	Advance to Semifinals
3	Canada	3	1	2	206	238	−32	4 (Note: Canada 83–79 Argentina)	
4	Argentina	3	1	2	214	244	−30	4	

(H) Hosts
Notes:

Results

October 26
20:00

Report

Mexico	69–73	Puerto Rico
Scoring by quarter: 24–16, 20–22, 7–16, 18–19
Pts: Mendez-Valdez, 20; Rebs: Hernández, 7 Asts: Stoll, 4		Pts: Balkman, 18; Rebs: Ubiles, 8 Asts: Barea, 4

CODE Dome, Guadalajara
Referees: Benito (BRA), Aracena (DOM), Fernandez (CUB)

October 27
13:00

Report

Argentina	79–78	Puerto Rico
Scoring by quarter: 24–22, 25–9, 13–22, 15–17
Pts: Sandes 15; Rebs: Sandes 8 Asts: Laprovittola 5		Pts: Barea 24; Rebs: Santiago 8 Asts: Barea, Berdiel 2

CODE Dome, Guadalajara
Referees: Rodriguez (VEN), Benito (BRA), Fernandez (CRC)

October 28
10:30

Report

Puerto Rico	80–58	Canada
Scoring by quarter: 19–21, 9–21, 15–19, 15–19
Pts: Barea 25; Rebs: Balkman 8 Asts: Berdiel 8		Pts: Ward 15; Rebs: Phillip 6 Asts: Lieffers 3

CODE Dome, Guadalajara
Referees: Rodriguez (VEN), Aracena (DOM), Fernandez (CUB)

Semifinals

October 29
20:00

Report

Puerto Rico	85–77	Dominican Republic
Scoring by quarter: 23–18, 20–19, 23–16, 19–24
Pts: Barea 22; Rebs: Balkman 7 Asts: Barea 5		Pts: Martinez 20; Rebs: Martinez 8 Asts: Soliver 4

CODE Dome, Guadalajara
Referees: Benito (BRA), Donnelly (CAN), Fernandez (ARG)

Finals

October 30
13:00

Report

Puerto Rico	74–72	Mexico

CODE Dome, Guadalajara

2011 Pan American Games gold medal

Puerto Rico

Women

Team

- Carla Cortijo
- Carla Escalera
- Sandra García
- Yolanda Jones
- Angiely Morales
- Michelle Pacheco
- Mari Placido
- Pamela Rosado
- Stephanie Rosado
- Jazmine Sepulveda
- Cynthia Valentin
- Esmary Vargas

Standings

Pos	Team	Pld	W	L	PF	PA	PD	Pts	Qualification
1	Mexico (H)	3	2	1	192	218	−26	5 (Note: Mexico 76–74 Puerto Rico)	Advance to Semifinals
2	Puerto Rico	3	2	1	222	216	+6	5	Advance to Semifinals
3	Argentina	3	1	2	185	186	−1	4 (Note: Argentina 58–55 United States)	
4	United States	3	1	2	212	191	+21	4	

(H) Hosts
Notes:

Results

October 21
20:00

Report

Mexico	76–74	Puerto Rico
Scoring by quarter: 23–17, 17–13, 21–27, 15–17
Pts: Silva, 22; Rebs: 2 players, 10; Asts: M. Garcia, 5		Pts: Sepulveda, 20; Rebs: 3 players, 5 Asts: 3 players, 3

CODE Dome, Guadalajara

October 22
17:30

Report

United States	70–75	Puerto Rico
Scoring by quarter: 25–14, 8–19, 18–16, 19–26
Pts: Stewart, 14; Rebs: 2 players, 11; Asts: Redmon, 3		Pts: Sepulveda, 21; Rebs: 2 players, 6 Asts: Cortijo, 5

CODE Dome, Guadalajara

October 23
13:00

Report

Puerto Rico	73–70	Argentina
Scoring by quarter: 16–17, 21–22, 10–13, 26–18
Pts: Escalera, 18; Rebs: Sepulveda, 5 Asts: Cortijo, 4		Pts: Burani, 24; Rebs: 2 players, 7 Asts: Carbrera, 6

CODE Dome, Guadalajara

Semifinals

October 24
13:00

Report

Brazil	68–69	Puerto Rico
Scoring by quarter: 17–13, 23–22, 12–21, 16–13
Pts: Valente, 16; Rebs: Souza, 15; Asts: Marçal, 4		Pts: Sepulveda, 22; Rebs: Placido, 7 Asts: Cortijo, 4

CODE Dome, Guadalajara

Finals

October 25
20:00

Report

Puerto Rico	85–67	Mexico
Scoring by quarter: 14 – 11, 21 – 19, 25 – 19, 25 – 18
Pts: Cortijo, 29; Rebs: Cortijo, 6 Asts: Cortijo, 10		Pts: Gomez, 33; Rebs: Gomez, 16; Asts: 2 players, 5

CODE Dome, Guadalajara

2011 Pan American Games gold medal

Puerto Rico

== Beach volleyball ==
Puerto Rico has qualified a men's team and women's team in the beach volleyball competition.

Athlete	Event	Preliminary Round			Quarterfinals	Semifinals	Finals
Athlete	Event	Opposition Score	Opposition Score	Opposition Score	Opposition Score	Opposition Score	Opposition Score
Roberto Rodríguez; Christopher Underwood	Men	Sellan Brown (JAM); Namarie Gordon (JAM); W 21-11, 21-13	Erick Rolando Garrido (GUA); Andy Alexis Leonardo (GUA); L 13-21, 21-23	Santiago Etchegaray (ARG); Pablo Miguel Suarez (ARG); W 21-18, 21-19	Did not advance		
Yarleen Santiago; Yamileska Yantin	Women	Marcela Alejandra Avalos (ESA); Diana Ivonne Romero (ESA); W 21-4, 21-7	Heather Ann Bansley (CAN); Elizabeth Maloney (CAN); W 21-19, 21-18	Ana Maria Gallay (ARG); Maria Virginia Zonta (ARG); W 21-18, 18-21, 15-11	Niriam Sinal (CUB); Onayamis Sinal (CUB); W 21-16, 21-18	Larissa França (BRA); Juliana Silva (BRA); L 16-21, 12-21	Bronze medal match: Emily Day (USA); Heather Hughes (USA); W 21-16, 16-21, 15-7 (bronze)

== Bowling ==
Puerto Rico has qualified two male and two female athletes in the bowling competition.

=== Men ===
Individual

Athlete	Event	Qualification															Eighth Finals	Quarterfinals	Semifinals	Finals	
Athlete	Event	Block 1 (Games 1–6)						Block 2 (Games 7–12)						Total	Average	Rank	Eighth Finals	Quarterfinals	Semifinals	Finals	
Athlete	Event	1	2	3	4	5	6	7	8	9	10	11	12	Total	Average	Rank	Opposition Scores	Opposition Scores	Opposition Scores	Opposition Scores	Rank
Francisco Colon	Men's individual	214	259	244	197	203	214	181	231	187	180	237	258	2605	217.1	7th	Alejandro Reyna (CRC); W 624 - 619	Manuel A. Fernandez (DOM); L 625 - 665	Did not advance		
Andraunick Simounet	Men's individual	192	255	211	210	166	169	225	195	203	216	213	226	2481	206.8	13th	Andrés Gómez (COL); L 587 - 612	Did not advance			

Pairs

Athlete	Event	Block 1 (Games 1–6)								Block 2 (Games 7–12)								Grand total	Final Rank
Athlete	Event	1	2	3	4	5	6	Total	Average	7	8	9	10	11	12	Total	Average	Grand total	Final Rank
Andraunick Simounet; Francisco Colon	Men's pairs	183	209	204	175	135	187	1093	182.2	199	201	225	223	214	157	2312	192.7	4778	6th
Andraunick Simounet; Francisco Colon	Men's pairs	174	169	203	209	152	191	1098	183.0	227	228	267	204	234	208	2466	205.5	4778	6th

=== Women ===
Individual

Athlete	Event	Qualification															Eighth Finals	Quarterfinals	Semifinals	Finals	
Athlete	Event	Block 1 (Games 1–6)						Block 2 (Games 7–12)						Total	Average	Rank	Eighth Finals	Quarterfinals	Semifinals	Finals	
Athlete	Event	1	2	3	4	5	6	7	8	9	10	11	12	Total	Average	Rank	Opposition Scores	Opposition Scores	Opposition Scores	Opposition Scores	Rank
Yoselin Leon	Women's individual	182	168	200	226	200	213	163	194	150	189	190	207	2282	190.2	15th	Elizabeth Ann Johnson (USA); L 626 - 676	Did not advance			
Mariana Ayala	Women's individual	144	178	191	164	242	176	187	204	182	186	178	159	2191	182.6	19th	Did not advance				

Pairs

Athlete	Event	Block 1 (Games 1–6)								Block 2 (Games 7–12)								Grand total	Final Rank
Athlete	Event	1	2	3	4	5	6	Total	Average	7	8	9	10	11	12	Total	Average	Grand total	Final Rank
Mariana Ayala; Yoselin Leon	Women's pairs	199	150	159	177	160	178	1023	170.5	171	157	195	223	211	135	2115	176.3	4265	11th
Mariana Ayala; Yoselin Leon	Women's pairs	158	183	172	179	171	158	1021	170.2	180	193	164	189	227	176	2150	179.2	4265	11th

== Boxing ==
Puerto Rico has qualified six boxers.

Men

Athlete	Event	Round of 16	Quarterfinals	Semifinals	Final
Athlete	Event	Opposition Result	Opposition Result	Opposition Result	Opposition Result
Jantony Ortíz	Light Flyweight	Junior Leandro Zarate (ARG); W 10 - 5	Gilberto Pedroza (PAN); W 17 - 6	Yosbny Veitia (CUB); L 9 - 14 (bronze)	Did not advance
Félix Verdejo	Bantamweight	Robenilson de Jesus (BRA); L 3 - 13	Did not advance		
Ángel Suárez	Lightweight	César Villarraga (COL); W 19 - 16	Julio Alberto Cortez (ECU); W 26 - 13	Robson da Conceição (BRA); L 8 - 27 (bronze)	Did not advance
Antonio Ortíz	Light Welterweight	Éverton Lopes (BRA); L RET R3 3:00	Did not advance		
Emmanuel de Jesus	Welterweight	Mian-Imtiaz Hussain (CAN); L 13 - 20	Did not advance		
Gerardo Bisbal	Super Heavyweight		Clayton Atkinson Laurent, Jr. (ISV); W KO R2 3:00	Ítalo Perea (ECU); L 8 - 27 (bronze)	Did not advance

Women

Athlete	Event	Quarterfinals	Semifinals	Final
Athlete	Event	Opposition Result	Opposition Result	Opposition Result
Kiria Tapia	Flyweight	Quanitta Lee Underwood (USA); W 17 - 17 (48-41)	Adela Celeste Peralta (ARG); W RSC R4 3:00	Erika Rosalba Cruz (MEX); W 22 - 12 (gold)

== Canoeing ==
Men

Athlete(s)	Event	Heats		Semifinals		Final	
Athlete(s)	Event	Time	Rank	Time	Rank	Time	Rank
Krishna Angueira	K-1 200 m	40.195	5th QS	38.960	5th	Did not advance	
Edgar Joel Padro	K-1 1000 m					4:33.289	9th
Reinier Mora; Fidel Antonio Vargas	K-2 200 m	49.097	6th QS	37.375	4th	Did not advance	

Women

Athlete(s)	Event	Heats		Semifinals		Final	
Athlete(s)	Event	Time	Rank	Time	Rank	Time	Rank
Mericarmen Rivera	K-1 200 m	45.359	5th QS	44.416	3rd QF	45.993	9th

== Cycling ==
=== Mountain Biking ===
Men

Athlete	Event	Time	Rank
Kelvin Gonzalez	Cross-country	DNS	

=== Cycling BMX ===
Athlete	Event	Qualifying Run 1		Qualifying Run 2		Qualifying Run 3		Qualifying	Semifinal		Final	
Athlete	Event	Time	Points	Time	Points	Time	Points	Points	Points	Rank	Time	Rank
Brian Perez	Men	48.220	5	45.000	6	41.079	6	17	Did not advance			
Dominique Daniels	Women	46.002	4	46.138	4	45.532	4	12 Q			45.632	5th

== Diving ==
Men

Athlete(s)	Event	Preliminary		Final	
Athlete(s)	Event	Points	Rank	Points	Rank
Rafael R. Quintero	3 m springboard	326.35	13th	Did not advance	

Women

Athlete(s)	Event	Preliminary		Final	
Athlete(s)	Event	Points	Rank	Points	Rank
Luisa M. Jimenez	3 m springboard	223.95	12th Q	250.30	10th
Angely Milagros Martinez	3 m springboard	10 m platform	206.15	13th	Did not advance

== Equestrian ==
=== Dressage ===
Athlete	Horse	Event	Grand Prix		Grand Prix Special		Grand Prix Freestyle		Final Score	Rank
Athlete	Horse	Event	Score	Rank	Score	Rank	Score	Rank	Final Score	Rank
Luis Denizard	Nalando	Individual	66.842	19th	66.237	18th	Did not advance			
Ursula Lange	Toftegardens Lobb	Individual	59.342	42nd	Did not advance					
Franchesca Liauw	GB Marko	Individual	58.447	46th	Did not advance					
Luis Denizard; Ursula Lange; Franchesca Liauw	Nalando; Toftegardens Lobb; GB Marko	Team	61.544	11th					61.544	11th

=== Eventing ===
Athlete	Horse	Event	Dressage		Cross-country		Jumping				Total	
Athlete	Horse	Event	Dressage		Cross-country		Qualifier		Final		Total	
Athlete	Horse	Event	Penalties	Rank	Penalties	Rank	Penalties	Rank	Penalties	Rank	Penalties	Rank
Lauren Billys	Ballingowan Ginger	Individual	50.60	7th	EL		Did not advance					

=== Individual jumping ===
Athlete	Horse	Event	Ind. 1st Qualifier		Ind. 2nd Qualifier			Ind. 3rd Qualifier			Ind. Final					
Athlete	Horse	Event	Ind. 1st Qualifier		Ind. 2nd Qualifier			Ind. 3rd Qualifier			Round A		Round B		Total	
Athlete	Horse	Event	Penalties	Rank	Penalties	Total	Rank	Penalties	Total	Rank	Penalties	Rank	Penalties	Rank	Penalties	Rank
Mark Watring	Greens Sleeps Vioco	Individual	7.74	38th	4.00	11.74	22nd	4.00	15.74	23rd	Did not advance					
Israel López	Admiral Clover	Individual	13.59	50th	DNS			Did not advance								

== Fencing ==
Puerto Rico has qualified one male and two female athletes in the foil competition and one female athlete in the sabre competition.

Men

Event	Athlete	Round of Poules		Round of 16	Quarterfinals	Semifinals	Final
Event	Athlete	Result	Seed	Opposition Score	Opposition Score	Opposition Score	Opposition Score
Individual foil	Angelo Justiniano	2 V - 3 D	12th	Alexander Massialas (USA); L 14 - 15	Did not advance		

Women

Event	Athlete	Round of Poules		Round of 16	Quarterfinals	Semifinals	Final
Event	Athlete	Result	Seed	Opposition Score	Opposition Score	Opposition Score	Opposition Score
Individual foil	Kristal Bas	1 V - 4 D	13th	Monica Peterson (CAN); L 6 - 15	Did not advance		
Individual foil	Luisa Parrilla	1 V - 4 D	17th	Did not advance			
Team foil	Kristal Bas; Luisa Parrilla; Karla Melendez				Chile; L 43 – 45		5th-6th place match: Cuba; L 22 - 45; 6th
Individual sabre	Melanie Mercado	1 V - 4 D	16th Q	Patricia Contreras (VEN); W 15 - 10	Yaritza Goulet (CUB); L 11 - 15	Did not advance	

== Gymnastics ==
=== Artistic ===
Puerto Rico has qualified six male and two female gymnasts in the artistic gymnastics competition.

Men
Individual qualification & Team Finals

Athlete	Event	Apparatus						Qualification		Final	
Athlete	Event	Floor	Pommel horse	Rings	Vault	Parallel bars	Horizontal bar	Total	Rank	Total	Rank
Rafael Morales	Ind Qualification	14.150	14.000	13.450	15.200			56.800	41st		
Angel Ramos	Ind Qualification	14.550	11.900	13.350	15.600	12.600	14.800	82.800	13th		
Tommy Ramos	Ind Qualification			14.950		11.850	13.800	40.600	52nd		
Luis Rivera	Ind Qualification	14.650	13.650	14.150	15.600	13.350	14.550	85.850	5th		
Alexander Rodríguez	Ind Qualification	14.750	14.600		14.700	13.300	14.700	72.050	30th		
Luis F. Vargas	Ind Qualification	14.200	14.250	13.550	15.550	14.300	14.650	86.500	3rd		
Team Totals; Four Best Scores	Team All-around	58.150	56.500	56.100	61.950	53.550	58.600			344.850	2nd place, silver medalist(s)

Individual Finals

Athlete	Event	Final							
Athlete	Event	Floor	Pommel horse	Rings	Vault	Parallel bars	Horizontal bar	Total	Rank
Luis Rivera	Individual All-around	14.900	12.350	14.500	15.300	14.150	14.050	85.250	5th
Luis Rivera	Individual Floor	14.250						14.250	6th
Luis Rivera	Individual Vault				14.275			14.275	8th
Luis F. Vargas	Individual All-around	12.800	13.800	14.400	15.300	14.250	14.400	84.950	6th
Luis F. Vargas	Individual Pommel Horse		13.225					13.225	6th
Luis F. Vargas	Individual Parallel Bars					14.825		14.825	3rd place, bronze medalist(s)
Alexander Rodríguez	Individual Floor	14.900						14.900	3rd place, bronze medalist(s)
Alexander Rodríguez	Individual Pommel Horse		13.400					13.400	5th
Alexander Rodríguez	Individual Horizontal Bar						14.225	14.225	6th
Tommy Ramos	Individual Rings			15.150				15.150	5th
Angel Ramos	Individual Vault				15.487			15.487	4th
Angel Ramos	Individual Horizontal Bar						14.625	14.625	3rd place, bronze medalist(s)

Women
Individual qualification & Team Finals

Athlete	Event	Apparatus				Qualification		Final	
Athlete	Event	Vault	Uneven bars	Balance Beam	Floor	Total	Rank	Total	Rank
Paula Mejias	Ind Qualification	13.900	11.150	11.175	13.600	49.225	31st		
Nicolle D. Vazquez	Ind Qualification	12.900	10.200	11.950	11.650	46.700	38th		

Individual Finals

Athlete	Event	Apparatus				Final	
Athlete	Event	Vault	Uneven bars	Balance Beam	Floor	Total	Rank
Paula Mejias	Individual All-around	13.600	10.875	11.850	12.575	48.900	17th
Paula Mejias	Individual Vault	13.837				13.837	6th
Nicolle D. Vazquez	Individual All-around	12.925	10.300	11.075	11.600	45.900	21st

=== Trampoline ===
Men

Athlete	Event	Qualification		Final	
Athlete	Event	Score	Rank	Score	Rank
Nathanael Camara	Individual	92.395	5th Q	11.325	7th

== Handball ==
Women

Team

- Adriana Cabrera
- Roxanaly Carrasquillo
- Natalys Ceballo
- Jerellyn Diaz
- Crystall Escalera
- Kitsa Escobar
- Ciris Garcia
- Jackeline Gonzalez
- Sheila Hiraldo
- Jailene Maldonando
- Fabiola Martinez
- Jenipher Melendez
- Lillianoska Natal
- Lizabeth Rodriguez
- Natalia Santos

Standings

Pos	Team	Pld	W	D	L	GF	GA	GD	Pts	Qualification
1	Argentina	3	3	0	0	87	60	+27	6	Semifinals
2	Mexico (H)	3	2	0	1	55	63	−8	4	Semifinals
3	Puerto Rico	3	1	0	2	76	84	−8	2	5th–8th place semifinals
4	Chile	3	0	0	3	63	74	−11	0	5th–8th place semifinals

Source: Guadalajara 2011
Rules for classification: 1) points; 2) head-to-head points; 3) head-to-head goal difference; 4) head-to-head goals scored; 5) goal difference; 6) goals scored; 7) draw.
(H) Hosts

Results

October 15; 15:00	Argentina	35–26	Puerto Rico	San Rafael Gymnasium; Referees: De Souza, Paz (BRA)
October 15; 15:00	Decilio 7	Report	Ceballo 7	San Rafael Gymnasium; Referees: De Souza, Paz (BRA)

October 17; 18:00	Puerto Rico	22–23	Mexico	San Rafael Gymnasium; Referees: Prieto, Gonzalez (URU)
October 17; 18:00	Garcia, 8	Report	Rivera, 4	San Rafael Gymnasium; Referees: Prieto, Gonzalez (URU)

October 19; 15:00	Puerto Rico	28–26	Chile	San Rafael Gymnasium; Referees: Meneses, Pinto (BRA)
October 19; 15:00	2 players, 7	Report	2 players, 5	San Rafael Gymnasium; Referees: Meneses, Pinto (BRA)

Fifth-eighth place matches

October 21; 10:00	Puerto Rico	29–27	United States	San Rafael Gymnasium; Referees: Prieto, Gonzalez (URU)
October 21; 10:00	Hiraldo, 10	Report	Darling, 6	San Rafael Gymnasium; Referees: Prieto, Gonzalez (URU)

Fifth place match

October 23; 12:30	Puerto Rico	27–31	Chile	San Rafael Gymnasium; Referees: Duran, Guzman (MEX)
October 23; 12:30	Garcia, 7	Report	Two players, 6	San Rafael Gymnasium; Referees: Duran, Guzman (MEX)

2011 Pan American Games 6th

Puerto Rico

== Judo ==
Puerto Rico has qualified three athletes in the 90 kg, 100 kg, and 100+kg men's categories and three athletes in the 63 kg, 70 kg, and 78+kg women's categories.

Men

Athlete	Event	Round of 16	Quarterfinals	Semifinals	Final
Athlete	Event	Opposition Result	Opposition Result	Opposition Result	Opposition Result
Gadiel Miranda	−81 kg		Osmay Cruz (CUB); W 001 S1 - 000 S2	Mervin Rodriguez (VEN); W 010 S2 - 001	Leandro Guilheiro (BRA); L 000 S2 - 101 S1 (silver)
Carlos Santiago	−100 kg	Luciano Corrêa (BRA); L 000 S4 - 100	Did not advance (to repechage round)		
Pablo Figueroa	+100 kg		Oscar Rene Brayson (COL); L 000 - 100	Did not advance (to repechage round)	

Repechage Rounds

Athlete	Event	Repechage 8	Repechage Final	Bronze Final
Athlete	Event	Opposition Result	Opposition Result	Opposition Result
Carlos Santiago	−100 kg	Kyle Vashkulat (USA); W 001 S1 - 000 S2	Albeny Rosales (VEN); W 010 S1 - 000 S3	Cristian Adolfo Schmidt (ARG); L 001 S1 - 100 S2
Pablo Figueroa	+100 kg		Carlos Erick Zegarra (PER); W 010 S1 - 000 S3	Ramon Enrique Flores (MEX); W GS 010 S1 - 001 S3 (bronze)

Women

Athlete	Event	Round of 16	Quarterfinals	Semifinals	Final
Athlete	Event	Opposition Result	Opposition Result	Opposition Result	Opposition Result
Jessica Garcia	−63 kg	Mariana Soledad Lopez (ARG); W 002 S2 - 001 S2	Katherine Campos (BRA); L 000 S2 - 002 S1	Did not advance (to repechage round)	
Maria Perez	−70 kg		Yuri Alvear (COL); L 000 S2 - 121	Did not advance (to repechage round)	
Melissa Mojica	+78 kg		Tanya Jael Llamuca (ECU); W 100 - 000 S1	Maria Suelen Altheman (BRA); W 100 - 000	Idalys Ortis (CUB); L 000 S4 - 101 (silver)

Repechage Rounds

Athlete	Event	Repechage 8	Repechage Final	Bronze Final
Athlete	Event	Opposition Result	Opposition Result	Opposition Result
Jessica Garcia	−63 kg		Christal Renee Ransom (USA); L 001 - 100 S1	Did not advance
Maria Perez	−70 kg		Vanessa Chala (ECU); W 120 - 000	Kelita Ivana Zupancic (CAN); W 001 S1 - 000 S2 (bronze)

== Karate ==
Puerto Rico has qualified one athlete in the 84+kg men's category and one athlete in the 68+kg women's category.

Athlete	Event	Round Robin (Pool A/B)			Semifinals	Final
Athlete	Event	Match 1	Match 2	Match 3	Semifinals	Final
Athlete	Event	Opposition Result	Opposition Result	Opposition Result	Opposition Result	Opposition Result
Nelson I. Gonzalez	Men's +84 kg	Kwame Kinsale (TRI); HWK 0:0	Shaun Dhillon (CAN); L PTS 0:2	Alberto A. Ramirez (MEX); L PTS 0:3	Did not advance	
Rosa Zavala	Women's +68 kg	Maria D. Castellanos (GUA); L PTS 0:3	Perla Zalazar (ARG); L PTS 1:2	Xunashi Caballero (MEX); L PTS 0:8	Did not advance	

== Roller skating ==
Men

Athlete	Event	Qualification		Final	
Athlete	Event	Result	Rank	Result	Rank
Javier Sepulveda	300 m time trial			26.547	9th
Javier Sepulveda	1,000 m	1:29.434	4th	Did not advance	
Javier Sepulveda	10,000 m			DNF	

Women

Artistic

Athlete	Event	Short Program		Long Program	
Athlete	Event	Result	Rank	Result	Rank
Marie Koesnodihardjo	Free skating	107.50	9th	108.50	8th

== Sailing ==
Puerto Rico has qualified four boats and six athletes in the sailing competition.

Men

Athlete	Event	Race											Net Points	Final Rank
Athlete	Event	1	2	3	4	5	6	7	8	9	10	M	Net Points	Final Rank
Alejandro Monllor	Windsurfer (RS:X)	8	8	7	9	(11); OCS	9	7	10	10	5	/	73.0	9th

Open

Athlete	Event	Race											Net Points	Final Rank
Athlete	Event	1	2	3	4	5	6	7	8	9	10	M	Net Points	Final Rank
Enrique Figueroa; Victor Aponte	Multihull (Hobie 16)	1	3	4	1	(8)	2	2	1	3	1	8	26.0	1st place, gold medalist(s)
Raul Rios; Marco Teixidor	Double-handed Dinghy (Snipe)	7	2	5	(11); DSQ	9	6	5	5	2	1	2	44.0	4th
Ivan Aponte	Single-handed Dinghy (Sunfish)	(10)	7	6	7	4	9	4	7	8	5	/	57.0	6th

== Shooting ==
Puerto Rico has qualified eleven quotas and eight athletes in the shooting competition.

Men

Event	Athlete	Qualification		Final	
Event	Athlete	Score	Rank	Score	Rank
10 m air rifle	Alexander Rivera	567-24x	24th	Did not advance	
50 m rifle prone	Alexander Rivera	571-17x	25th	Did not advance	
50 m rifle three positions	Alexander Rivera	DNS		Did not advance	
Double Trap	Lucas Rafael Bennazar	128	9th	Did not advance	
Double Trap	José Torres	136	2nd Q	185	2nd place, silver medalist(s)
Skeet	Luis Bermudez	119	5th	141	4th
Skeet	Jesus M. Medero	107	27th	Did not advance	

Women

Event	Athlete	Qualification		Final	
Event	Athlete	Score	Rank	Score	Rank
10 m air rifle	Amy Bock	388-26x	14th	Did not advance	
10 m air rifle	Yarimar Mercado	388-24x	10th	Did not advance	
50 m rifle three positions	Amy Bock	566-18x	8th Q	659.1	6th
Trap	Vivian Rodriguez	61 +2	6th Q	76	6th

== Softball ==
Puerto Rico has qualified a team to participate. The team will be made up of 17 athletes.

Team

- Gabriela Andino
- Lisandra Berrios
- Izmena Cabrera
- Kaylyn Camacho
- Lisaira Daniels
- Shirley Daniels
- Aisha Figueroa
- Lissette Garay
- Nicollette Levine
- Aleimalee Lopez
- Zomarie Lozano
- Rachel Martinez
- Jessica Melendez
- Kiara Nazario
- Nicole Osterman
- Laura Ramos
- Monica Santos

Standings

Qualified for the semifinals
Eliminated

All times are Central Daylight Time (UTC−5)

Rank	Team	W	L	RS	RA
1	United States	7	0	54	6
2	Cuba	5	2	28	13
3	Venezuela	5	2	31	20
4	Canada	5	2	46	23
5	Dominican Republic	2	5	22	37
6	Mexico	2	5	18	37
7	Puerto Rico	2	5	27	42
8	Argentina	0	7	4	59

Results

October 17, 2011; 9:00	Dominican Republic	2 – 3	Puerto Rico	Pan American Softball Stadium, Guadalajara; Attendance: 350
October 17, 2011; 9:00		Boxscore		Pan American Softball Stadium, Guadalajara; Attendance: 350

October 17, 2011; 16:00	Canada	10 – 2	Puerto Rico	Pan American Softball Stadium, Guadalajara; Attendance: 300
October 17, 2011; 16:00		Boxscore		Pan American Softball Stadium, Guadalajara; Attendance: 300

October 18, 2011; 11:00	Puerto Rico	1 – 4	Cuba	Pan American Softball Stadium, Guadalajara; Attendance: 200
October 18, 2011; 11:00		Boxscore		Pan American Softball Stadium, Guadalajara; Attendance: 200

October 19, 2011; 16:00	United States	4 – 1	Puerto Rico	Pan American Softball Stadium, Guadalajara; Attendance: 415
October 19, 2011; 16:00		Boxscore		Pan American Softball Stadium, Guadalajara; Attendance: 415

October 20, 2011; 9:00	Puerto Rico	10 – 0	Argentina	Pan American Softball Stadium, Guadalajara; Attendance: 100
October 20, 2011; 9:00		Boxscore		Pan American Softball Stadium, Guadalajara; Attendance: 100

October 21, 2011; 13:00	Venezuela	10 – 5	Puerto Rico	Pan American Softball Stadium, Guadalajara; Attendance: 250
October 21, 2011; 13:00		Boxscore		Pan American Softball Stadium, Guadalajara; Attendance: 250

October 21, 2011; 18:00	Mexico	12 – 5	Puerto Rico	Pan American Softball Stadium, Guadalajara; Attendance: 453
October 21, 2011; 18:00		Boxscore		Pan American Softball Stadium, Guadalajara; Attendance: 453

2011 Pan American Games 7th

Puerto Rico

== Swimming ==
Men

Athlete(s)	Event	Preliminaries		Final	
Athlete(s)	Event	Result	Rank	Result	Rank
100 m Freestyle	Raul Martinez	52.06	17th qB	51.94	7th B
200 m Freestyle	Raul Martinez	1:54.04	12th qB	1:54.19	7th B
400 m Freestyle	Raul Martinez	4:05.05	12th qB	4:04.25	4th B
100 m Breaststroke	Eladio Carrión	1:05.36	15th qB	1:05.22	7th B
200 m Breaststroke	Eladio Carrión	2:20.78	8th Q	2:20.31	8th
200 m Individual Medley	Eladio Carrión	2:13.57	13th qB	2:11.14	3rd B
10 km	Nathaniel Ramos			2:11:39.0	13th

Women

Athlete(s)	Event	Preliminaries		Final	
Athlete(s)	Event	Result	Rank	Result	Rank
50 m Freestyle	Vanessa García	25.64	5th Q	25.39	4th
50 m Freestyle	Debra Rodriguez	27.28	18th	Did not advance	
100 m Freestyle	Vanessa García	55.73	2nd Q	55.55	4th
100 m Backstroke	Alana Berrocal	1:06.09	17th	Did not advance	
200 m Backstroke	Alana Berrocal	2:24.76	11th qB	2:24.18	5th B
100 m Breaststroke	Patricia Casellas	1:15.56	18th	Did not advance	
100 m Breaststroke	Trysha Centeno	1:13.04	9th qB	1:12.87	5th B
200 m Breaststroke	Patricia Casellas	2:48.83	14th qB	2:47.15	6th B
100 m Butterfly	Barbara Caraballo	1:05.23	18th	Did not advance	
100 m Butterfly	Debra Rodriguez	1:04.29	16th qB	1:03.63	6th B
200 m Individual Medley	Barbara Caraballo	2:28.36	15th qB	2:27.57	8th B
400 m Individual Medley	Maria Alejandra Torres	5:17.07	14th qB	5:17.61	5th B
4 × 100 m Medley Relay	Alana Berrocal; Debra Rodriguez; Barbara Caraballo; Trysha Centeno; Patricia Casellas	4:34.65	8th Q	4:23.16	8th
10 km	Betsmara Cruz			DNF	
10 km	Zuleimarie Hornedo			2:22:27.2	13th

== Table tennis ==
Puerto Rico has qualified three female athletes to compete in the individual table tennis competition.

Women

Athlete	Event	Round Robin			1st Round	Eighthfinals	Quarterfinals	Semifinals	Final
Athlete	Event	Match 1	Match 2	Match 3	1st Round	Eighthfinals	Quarterfinals	Semifinals	Final
Athlete	Event	Opposition Result	Opposition Result	Opposition Result	Opposition Result	Opposition Result	Opposition Result	Opposition Result	Opposition Result
Carelyn Cordero	Singles	Johenny Valdez (DOM); L 3 - 4	Jessica Yamada (BRA); L 1 - 4	Wang De Ying (ESA); L 1 - 4	Did not advance				
Jerica Marrero	Singles	Andrea Estrada (GUA); L 1 - 4	Luisana Perez (VEN); W 4 - 2	Paulina Vega (CHI); L 0 - 4	Did not advance				
Daniely Ríos	Singles	Yadira Silva (MEX); L 1 - 4	Shirley Fu (CAN); L 1 - 4	Caroline Kumahara (BRA); L 2 - 4	Did not advance				

== Taekwondo ==
Puerto Rico has qualified six athletes (two male and four female).

Men

Athlete	Event	Round of 16	Quarterfinals	Semifinals	Final
Athlete	Event	Opposition Result	Opposition Result	Opposition Result	Opposition Result
Luis Colón	Featherweight (-68kg)	Federico Rosal (GUA); L 2 - 14	Did not advance		
Marvin Sellas	Heavyweight (+80kg)	Federico Rosal (VEN); L KO	Did not advance		

Women

Athlete	Event	Round of 16	Quarterfinals	Semifinals	Final
Athlete	Event	Opposition Result	Opposition Result	Opposition Result	Opposition Result
Johanny Tejada	Flyweight (-57kg)	Andrea Franco (BOL); W 9-1	Jannet Alegria (MEX); L 6-12	Did not advance	
Emely Cartagena	Featherweight (-57kg)	Andrea Franco (ARG); W 5-2	Doris Patiño (COL); L 2-3	Did not advance	
Asunción Ocasio	Welterweight (-67kg)		Taimi Castellanos (CUB); L 1-2	Did not advance	
Nikki Martínez	Heavyweight (+67kg)		Natalia Forcada (ARG); W 8-1	Guadalupe Ruiz (MEX); W 9-8	Glenhis Hernández (CUB); L 13-0 (silver)

== Tennis ==
Men

Athlete	Event	1st Round	Round of 32	Round of 16	Quarterfinals	Semifinals	Final
Athlete	Event	Opposition Score	Opposition Score	Opposition Score	Opposition Score	Opposition Score	Opposition Score
Alexander Llompart	Singles	William Dorante (CUB); W 6 - 3, 6 - 2	Rogério Dutra (BRA); L 1 - 6, 2 - 6	Did not advance			

Women

Athlete	Event	1st Round	Round of 16	Quarterfinals	Semifinals	Final	
Athlete	Event	Opposition Score	Opposition Score	Opposition Score	Opposition Score	Opposition Score	Opposition Score
Monica Puig	Singles	Ana-Clara Duarte (BRA); W 6 - 1, 6 - 4	Adriana Pérez (VEN); W 6 - 0, 7 - 5	Mariana Duque (COL); W 6 - 2, 6 - 3	Christina McHale (USA); W 7 - 6(2), 6 - 4	Irina Falconi (USA); L 3 - 6, 2 - 6 (silver)	
Jessica Roland	Singles	Doménica González (ECU); W 6 - 2, 7 - 5	María Fernanda Álvarez (BOL); W 6 - 4, 6 - 3	Florencia Molinero (ARG); L 4 - 6, 2 - 6	Did not advance		

Mixed

Athlete	Event	1st Round	Quarterfinals	Semifinals	Final
Athlete	Event	Opposition Score	Opposition Score	Opposition Score	Opposition Score
Monica Puig; Alexander Llompart	Mixed Doubles	Bianca Botto (PER); Duilio Beretta (PER); W 5 - 7, 7 - 5, [7-10]	Did not advance		

== Triathlon ==
Men

Athlete	Event	Swim (1.5 km)	Trans 1	Bike (40 km)	Trans 2	Run (10 km)	Total	Rank
Edgardo Velez	Individual	18:26; 16th	0:24; 13th	57:15; 13th	0:16; 13th	37:21; 19th	1:53:44	19th

Women

Athlete	Event	Swim (1.5 km)	Trans 1	Bike (40 km)	Trans 2	Run (10 km)	Total	Rank
Melissa Rios	Individual	20:45 =13th	0:25; 2nd	1:03:11; 12th	0:21; 18th	42:48; 14th	2:07:33	16th
Militza Rios	Individual	20:10; 8th	0:28; 21st	1:03:46; 17th	0:18; 13th	45:47; 17th	2:10:31	17th

== Volleyball ==
Men

Team

- Gregory Berrios
- Enrique Escalante
- Juan Figueroa
- Jonathan King
- Fernando Morales
- Roberto Muñiz
- Jean Ortíz
- Ángel Pérez
- Víctor Rivera
- Sequiel Sánchez
- Pedrito Sierra
- Héctor Soto

Standings

Pos	Team	Pld	W	L	Pts	SPW	SPL	SPR	SW	SL	SR	Qualification
1	Brazil	3	3	0	14	243	171	1.421	9	1	9.000	Semifinals
2	Puerto Rico	3	1	2	7	227	244	0.930	5	6	0.833	Quarterfinals
3	United States	3	1	2	6	313	324	0.966	6	8	0.750	Quarterfinals
4	Canada	3	1	2	3	238	282	0.844	3	8	0.375	

Results

Date		Score		Set 1	Set 2	Set 3	Set 4	Set 5	Total	Report
Oct 24	United States	3–2	Puerto Rico	22–25	25–19	20–25	25–16	15–13	107–98	Report
Oct 25	Brazil	3–0	Puerto Rico	25–22	25–14	25–18			75–54	Report
Oct 26	Puerto Rico	3–0	Canada	25-22	25-17	25-23			75-62	Report

Quarterfinals

Date		Score		Set 1	Set 2	Set 3	Set 4	Set 5	Total	Report
Oct 27	Puerto Rico	2–3	Mexico	26-24	25-16	26-28	21-25	9-15	107-108	Report

Fifth to eighth place classification

Date		Score		Set 1	Set 2	Set 3	Set 4	Set 5	Total	Report
Oct 28	Canada	3–1	Puerto Rico	25–20	19–25	25–19	25–20		94–84	Report

Seventh place match

Date		Score		Set 1	Set 2	Set 3	Set 4	Set 5	Total	Report
Oct 29	Venezuela	2–3	Puerto Rico	23–25	19–25	25–19	25–21	8–15	100–105	Report

2011 Pan American Games 7th

Puerto Rico

Women

Team

- Sarai Álvarez
- Áurea Cruz
- Stephanie Enright
- Shirley Ferrer
- Vilmary Mojica
- Lynda Morales
- Michelle Nogueras
- Diana Reyes
- Yarimar Rosa
- Daly Santana
- Amanda Vázquez
- Shara Venegas

Standings

Pos	Team	Pld	W	L	Pts	SPW	SPL	SPR	SW	SL	SR	Qualification
1	United States	3	3	0	15	231	161	1.435	9	0	MAX	Semifinals
2	Puerto Rico	3	2	1	8	245	231	1.061	6	5	1.200	Quarterfinals
3	Peru	3	1	2	5	225	262	0.859	4	7	0.571	Quarterfinals
4	Mexico	3	0	3	2	224	271	0.827	2	9	0.222	

Results

Date		Score		Set 1	Set 2	Set 3	Set 4	Set 5	Total	Report
Oct 15	United States	3–0	Puerto Rico	25–17	25–18	25–14			75–49	Report
Oct 16	Puerto Rico	3–1	Mexico	22–25	25–21	25–18	25–13		97–77	Report
Oct 17	Peru	1–3	Puerto Rico	26–24	21–25	21–25	11–25		79–99	Report

Quarterfinals

Date		Score		Set 1	Set 2	Set 3	Set 4	Set 5	Total	Report
Oct 18	Puerto Rico	2–3	Dominican Republic	21–25	22–25	28–26	25–22	8–15	104–113	Report

Fifth to eighth place classification;

Date		Score		Set 1	Set 2	Set 3	Set 4	Set 5	Total	Report
Oct 19	Puerto Rico	3–2	Mexico	20–25	25–14	9–25	25–10	15–9	94–83	Report

Fifth place match

Date		Score		Set 1	Set 2	Set 3	Set 4	Set 5	Total	Report
Oct 20	Peru	0–3	Puerto Rico	23–25	20–25	19–25			62–75	Report

2011 Pan American Games 5th

Puerto Rico

== Water polo ==
Puerto Rico has qualified a women's team.

Women

Team

- Angelica Garcia
- Estefania Laboy
- Reina Lopez
- Caroline Matos
- Paola Medina
- Alejandra Ortiz
- Amanda Ortiz
- Angelica Ortiz
- Cristina Ortiz
- Osmarie Quinones
- Anaid Ralat
- Mairim Rosario
- Francheska Salib

Qualified for the semifinals

Standings

Team	GP	W	D	L	GF	GA	GD	Pts
United States	3	3	0	0	63	7	+56	6
Cuba	3	2	0	1	22	36	-12	4
Puerto Rico	3	1	0	2	28	43	-15	2
Argentina	3	0	0	3	11	38	-27	0

October 23, 2011; 9:45	Report	Puerto Rico	12–13	Cuba	Scotiabank Aquatics Center, Guadalajara; Referees: Burt (CAN), Arnoldo (VEN)
October 23, 2011; 9:45	Report	Score by quarters: 4 – 4, 2 – 3, 3 – 2, 3 – 4			Scotiabank Aquatics Center, Guadalajara; Referees: Burt (CAN), Arnoldo (VEN)
October 23, 2011; 9:45	Report	Medina 4	Goals	Hernandez, Gutierrez 3	Scotiabank Aquatics Center, Guadalajara; Referees: Burt (CAN), Arnoldo (VEN)

October 24, 2011; 12:15	Report	Puerto Rico	4–24	United States	Scotiabank Aquatics Center, Guadalajara; Referees: Lopez (COL), Werner (BRA)
October 24, 2011; 12:15	Report	Score by quarters: 0 – 8, 2 – 7, 1 – 7, 1 – 2			Scotiabank Aquatics Center, Guadalajara; Referees: Lopez (COL), Werner (BRA)
October 24, 2011; 12:15	Report	García, Ralat 2	Goals	Craig 4	Scotiabank Aquatics Center, Guadalajara; Referees: Lopez (COL), Werner (BRA)

October 25, 2011; 8:30	Report	Argentina	6–12	Puerto Rico	Scotiabank Aquatics Center, Guadalajara; Referees: Mejia (MEX) Dykman (CAN)
October 25, 2011; 8:30	Report	Score by quarters: 3 – 1, 0 – 3, 3 – 4, 0 – 4			Scotiabank Aquatics Center, Guadalajara; Referees: Mejia (MEX) Dykman (CAN)
October 25, 2011; 8:30	Report	Ledoux 2	Goals	Ralat, Ortiz 3	Scotiabank Aquatics Center, Guadalajara; Referees: Mejia (MEX) Dykman (CAN)

Elimination stage Crossover

October 26, 2011; 12:30	Report	Venezuela	6–11	Puerto Rico	Scotiabank Aquatics Center, Guadalajara; Referees: Dykman (CAN), Madera (CUB)
October 26, 2011; 12:30	Report	Score by quarters: 0 – 2, 2 – 3, 2 – 3, 2 – 3			Scotiabank Aquatics Center, Guadalajara; Referees: Dykman (CAN), Madera (CUB)
October 26, 2011; 12:30	Report	6 players, 1	Goals	Medina, Ortiz 3	Scotiabank Aquatics Center, Guadalajara; Referees: Dykman (CAN), Madera (CUB)

Fifth place match

October 28, 2011; 14:00	Report	Puerto Rico	15–13	Mexico	Scotiabank Aquatics Center, Guadalajara; Referees: Burt (CAN), Werner (BRA)
October 28, 2011; 14:00	Report	Score by quarters: 2 – 3, 5 – 3, 5 – 4, 3 – 3			Scotiabank Aquatics Center, Guadalajara; Referees: Burt (CAN), Werner (BRA)
October 28, 2011; 14:00	Report	Medina 5	Goals	Orozco 3	Scotiabank Aquatics Center, Guadalajara; Referees: Burt (CAN), Werner (BRA)

2011 Pan American Games 5th

Puerto Rico

== Weightlifting ==
Athlete	Event	Snatch			Clean & Jerk			Total	Rank
Athlete	Event	Attempt 1	Attempt 2	Attempt 3	Attempt 1	Attempt 2	Attempt 3	Total	Rank
Carlos Alberto Sauri	Men's 77 kg	132	137	~~142~~	160	~~167~~	~~167~~	297	6th
Moises Cartegena	Men's 94 kg	145	~~151~~	151	172	177	~~180~~	328	6th
Roberto Carlos Rosado	Men's 94 kg	135	140	~~145~~	175	180	~~188~~	320	8th
Juan Carlos Marcial	Men's 105 kg	~~125~~	125	135	150	160	~~170~~	295	8th
Lely Berlitt Burgos	Women's 48 kg	~~71~~	71	~~75~~	90	95	99	170	1st place, gold medalist(s)
Norel M. Castillo	Women's 53 kg	57	60	~~65~~	72	76	78	138	9th
Joan Rivera	Women's 53 kg	60	~~62~~	62	~~72~~	~~76~~	76	138	10th
Norma I. Figueroa	Women's 69 kg	85	~~90~~	~~90~~	110	~~115~~	---	195	7th
Norma I. Figueroa	Women's +75 kg	85	~~90~~	~~90~~	100	107	~~112~~	192	7th

== Wrestling ==
Puerto Rico has qualified four athletes in the 60 kg, 84 kg, 96 kg, and 120 kg in the men's freestyle categories, two athletes in the 60 kg and 74 kg men's Greco-Roman categories, and three athletes in the 48 kg, 55 kg, and 72 kg women's freestyle categories.

Men

Freestyle

Athlete	Event	Round of 16	Quarterfinals	Semifinals	Final
Athlete	Event	Opposition Result	Opposition Result	Opposition Result	Opposition Result
Franklin Gómez	60 kg		Gabriel García Sánchez (DOM); W PO 3 - 0	Yowlys Bonne (CUB); W PO 3 - 0	Guillermo Torres (MEX); W PO 3 - 0 (gold)
Pedro Soto	66 kg	Ghandi Marquez (MEX); W PO 3 - 0	Yoan Blanco (ECU); W PO 3 - 0	Elvis Fuentes (VEN); W PO 3 - 0	Liván López (CUB); L PO 0 - 3 (silver)
Jaime Espinal	84 kg		Jacob John Herbert (DOM); L PP 1 - 3		Bronze medal match: José Díaz (VEN); L PP 1 - 3
Marcos Santos	96 kg		Luis Vivenes (VEN); L PP 1 - 3		Bronze medal match: Juan Esteban Martínez (COL); L PP 1 - 3
Edgardo Lopez	120 kg		Sunny Dhinsa (CAN); L ST 0 - 4		Bronze medal match: Carlos José Feliz García (DOM); L PP 1 - 3

Greco-Roman

Athlete	Event	Round of 16	Quarterfinals	Semifinals	Final
Athlete	Event	Opposition Result	Opposition Result	Opposition Result	Opposition Result
Germán Díaz	60 kg		Jansel Rafael Ramírez (DOM); L VT 0 - 5	Did not advance	
Otoniel Pérez	74 kg		José Uber Escobar (COL); L PO 0 - 3	Did not advance	
Edgardo López	120 kg		Victor Alfonso Asprilla (COL); L PO 0 - 3	Did not advance	

Women

Freestyle

Athlete	Event	Quarterfinals	Semifinals	Final
Athlete	Event	Opposition Result	Opposition Result	Opposition Result
Nesmarie Rodríguez	48 kg	Luisa Elizabeth Valverde (ECU); L PP 1 - 3	Did not advance	
Enid Rivera	55 kg	Lissette Alexandra Antes (ECU); L PO 0 - 3	Did not advance	
Natalia Rodríguez	72 kg	Elsa A. Sanchez Sanchez (DOM); L PP 1 - 3	Did not advance	
