= Basketball at the 2011 Pan American Games =

16th Pan American Games Basketball Tournament
- Guadalajara 2011

Tournament details
- Pan American Games: 2011 Pan American Games
- Host nation: Mexico
- City: Guadalajara
- Venue: CODE Dome
- Duration: October 21 – October 30

Men's tournament
- Teams: 8
Medals
Gold medalists	Puerto Rico
Silver medalists	Mexico
Bronze medalists	United States

Women's tournament
- Teams: 8
Medals
Gold medalists	Puerto Rico
Silver medalists	Mexico
Bronze medalists	Brazil

Official website
- www.guadalajara2011.org.mx/sports/discipline/basketball

Tournaments
← 2007 Rio de Janeiro	2015 Toronto →

Basketball competitions at the 2011 Pan American Games in Guadalajara were held from October 21 to October 30 at the CODE Dome. Each team was allowed to enter a maximum of twelve athletes. Puerto Rico won both the men's and women's competitions, with Mexico placing second in both competitions. The United States won bronze in the men's competition, while Brazil won bronze in the women's competition.

== Medal summary ==
=== Medal table ===
Rank	Nation	Gold	Silver	Bronze	Total
1	Puerto Rico	2	0	0	2
2	Mexico	0	2	0	2
3	Brazil	0	0	1	1
3	United States	0	0	1	1
Totals (4 entries)		2	2	2	6

=== Events ===
Event	Gold	Silver	Bronze
Men	Puerto Rico; Renaldo Balkman; José Juan Barea; Carlos Arroyo; Filiberto Rivera; Carlos Strong; Samuel Villegas; Miguel "Ali" Berdiel; Edwin Ubiles; Gabriel Colón; Luis Villafañe; Manuel Narvaez; Daniel Santiago	Mexico; Paul Stoll; Jovan Harris; Pedro Meza; Christopher Hernández; Adam Parada; Michael Strobbe; Víctor Mariscal; Omar Quintero; Hector Hernandez; Orlando Mendez; Lorenzo Real; Jesus Lopez	United States; Blake Ahearn; Brian Butch; Justin Dentmon; Jerome Dyson; Moses Ehambe; Marcus Lewis; Leo Lyons; Renaldo Major; Donald Sloan; Greg Stiemsma; Curtis Sumpter; Lance Thomas
Women	Puerto Rico; Angelica Bermudez; Carla Cortijo; Carla Escalera; Michelle Gonzalez; Yolanda Jones; Angiely Morales; Michelle Pacheco; Mari Placido; Pamela Rosado; Jazmine Sepulveda; Cynthia Valentin; Esmary Vargas	Mexico; Marie Bibbs; Alexis Castro; Azucena Loudres; Abril Garcia; Monica Garcia; Sofia Garica; Erika Gomez; Fernanda Guitierrez; Laura Nuñez; Maylene Ornelas; Sonia Ortega; Brisa Silva	Brazil; Tassia Carcavalli; Damiris Dantas; Izabela De Andrade; Barbara De Queiroz; Carina De Souza; Erika De Souza; Clarissa Dos Santos; Gilmara Justino; Palmira Marcal; Iziane Marques; Jaqueline Silvestre; Silvia Valente

== Qualification ==
An NOC may enter up to one men's team with 12 players and up to one women's team with 12 players. Canada, the United States and the host country qualify automatically, as do five other teams through regional tournaments.

=== Basketball – Men ===
North America	South America	Automatic qualifiers
Puerto Rico; Dominican Republic	Brazil; Argentina; Uruguay	Canada; Mexico; United States

=== Basketball – Women ===
North America	South America	Automatic qualifiers
Puerto Rico; Jamaica	Brazil; Argentina; Colombia	Canada; Mexico; United States

== Schedule ==
The competition will be spread out across nine days, with the women competing first, followed by the men.

Preliminary round	Semifinals	M	Event finals

October	21st Fri	22nd Sat	23rd Sun	24th Mon	25th Tue	26th Wed	27th Thu	28th Fri	29th Sat	30th Sun	Gold medals
Men										M	1
Women					M						1

== Controversy ==
The Mexican Olympic Committee (COM) refused to endorse the Mexican Sports Association (ADEMEBA), the body recognized by the International Basketball Federation (FIBA), because FIBA had threatened to suspend ADEMEBA membership which put the entire basketball tournament in jeopardy. However, the Pan American Sports Organization (PASO) later confirmed that the basketball tournament would be held and the event would not be cancelled.
