= Swimming at the 2011 Pan American Games – Men's 400 metre freestyle =

Men's 400 metre freestyle at the 2011 Pan American Games
- Venue: Scotiabank Aquatics Center
- Dates: October 15 (preliminaries and finals)
- Competitors: 14 from 9 nations

Medalists
Gold medal	Charlie Houchin	United States
Silver medal	Matt Patton	United States
Bronze medal	Cristian Quintero	Venezuela

The men's 400 metre freestyle competition of the swimming events at the 2011 Pan American Games took place on the 15 of October at the Scotiabank Aquatics Center. The defending Pan American Games champion is Matt Patton of the United States.

This race consisted of eight lengths of the pool, with all eight being in the freestyle stroke.

== Records ==
Prior to this competition, the existing world and Pan American Games records were as follows:

World record	Paul Biedermann (GER)	3:40.07	Rome, Italy	July 26, 2009
Pan American Games record	Matt Patton (USA)	3:49.77	Rio de Janeiro, Brazil	July 18, 2007

== Qualification ==
Each National Olympic Committee (NOC) was able to enter up to two entrants providing they had met the A standard (4:19.9) in the qualifying period (January 1, 2010 to September 4, 2011). NOCs were also permitted to enter one athlete providing they had met the B standard (4:27.7) in the same qualifying period.

== Results ==
All times shown are in minutes.

KEY:	q	Fastest non-qualifiers	Q	Qualified	NR	National record	PB	Personal best	SB	Seasonal best

=== Heats ===
The first round was held on October 15.

Rank	Heat	Lane	Name	Nationality	Time	Notes
1	1	4	Matt Patton	United States	3:54.70	QA
2	1	5	Cristian Quintero	Venezuela	3:56.67	QA
3	1	2	Martin Naidich	Argentina	3:56.81	QA
4	1	3	Alejandro Gómez	Venezuela	3:57.18	QA
5	2	4	Charlie Houchin	United States	3:57.98	QA
6	2	5	Juan Martin Pereyra	Argentina	3:58.10	QA
7	2	3	Lucas Kanieski	Brazil	3:58.30	QA
8	2	6	Arturo Perez Vertti	Mexico	3:58.60	QA
9	1	7	Daniel Delgadillo	Mexico	4:00.60	QB
10	2	2	Francis Despond	Canada	4:01.88	QB
11	1	6	Giuliano Rocco	Brazil	4:04.25	QB
12	2	7	Raul Martinez	Puerto Rico	4:05.05	QB
13	2	1	Sebastian Jahnsen	Peru	4:13.73	QB
14	1	1	Allan Gutierrez	Honduras	4:20.17	QB

=== Final ===
The final will be held on October 15.

==== Final B ====
Rank	Lane	Name	Nationality	Time	Notes
1	5	Francis Despond	Canada	4:00.16	
2	3	Giuliano Rocco	Brazil	4:00.61	
3	4	Daniel Delgadillo	Mexico	4:00.81	
4	6	Raul Martinez	Puerto Rico	4:04.25	
5	2	Sebastian Jahnsen	Peru	4:05.56	
6	7	Allan Gutierrez	Honduras	4:19.71	

==== Final A ====
The final was held on October 15.

Rank	Lane	Name	Nationality	Time	Notes
1st place, gold medalist(s)	2	Charlie Houchin	United States	3:50.95	
2nd place, silver medalist(s)	4	Matth Patton	United States	3:51.25	
3rd place, bronze medalist(s)	5	Cristian Quintero	Venezuela	3:52.51	
4	7	Juan Martin Pereyra	Argentina	3:52.71	
5	1	Lucas Kanieski	Brazil	3:56.26	
6	6	Alejandro Gómez	Venezuela	3:56.28	
7	3	Martin Naidich	Argentina	3:56.77	
8	8	Arturo Perez Vertti	Mexico	3:58.33	
