= Charlie Houchin =

American swimmer (born 1987)

Personal information
- Full name: Charles Houchin
- Nickname: "Charlie"
- National team: United States
- Born: November 3, 1987 (age 38) Lake Forest, Illinois, U.S.
- Home town: Raleigh, North Carolina, U.S.
- Height: 6 ft 3 in (191 cm)
- Weight: 185 lb (84 kg)

Sport
- Sport: Swimming
- Strokes: Freestyle
- Club: IX3[sports]
- College team: University of Michigan
Medal record
Men's swimming
Representing the United States
Olympic Games
Gold medal – first place	2012 London	4×200 m freestyle
World Championships (LC)
Gold medal – first place	2013 Barcelona	4×200 m freestyle
World Championships (SC)
Silver medal – second place	2010 Dubai	4×200 m freestyle
Pan American Games
Gold medal – first place	2011 Guadalajara	400 m freestyle
Gold medal – first place	2011 Guadalajara	4×200 m freestyle

Charles Houchin (born November 3, 1987) is an American former competition swimmer who has had his greatest international success in freestyle relay events. He earned a gold medal as a member of the winning United States team in the 4×200-meter freestyle relay at the 2012 Summer Olympics. He is the CEO and founder of Swimmingly.

== Early years ==
Houchin graduated from William G. Enloe High School in Raleigh, North Carolina. Both of his parents were All-American swimmers for North Carolina State University. Houchin attended the University of Michigan, where he swam for the Michigan Wolverines swimming and diving team in National Collegiate Athletic Association (NCAA) competition from 2006 to 2010. He graduated from Michigan with a bachelor's degree in sports management in 2010. He currently swims for IX3[sports] in Jacksonville, Florida.

== Professional career ==
Houchin used the money he earned from his gold medal at the 2012 London Olympics to found Swimmingly and create Meet Central.

== Swimming career ==
At the 2010 FINA Short Course World Championships, Houchin won a silver medal in the 4×200-meter freestyle relay for his contributions in the heats.

At the 2011 World Aquatics Championships in Shanghai, China, Houchin competed in one event, the 400-meter freestyle. Houchin posted a time of 3:48.80 in the heats and did not advance to the final, finishing fourteenth overall.

At the 2011 Pan American Games in Guadalajara, Mexico, Houchin won two gold medals in the 400-meter freestyle and the 4×200-meter freestyle relay.

At the 2012 United States Olympic Trials, the qualifying meet for the 2012 Olympics, Houchin made the U.S. Olympic team for the first time by finishing sixth in the 200-meter freestyle with a time of 1:46.88, which qualified him to swim in the 4×200-meter freestyle as a member of the U.S. relay team. Houchin also competed in the 400-meter freestyle at the trials, and finished fourth overall (3:48.32). At the 2012 Summer Olympics in London, Houchin earned a gold medal by swimming for the winning U.S. team in the preliminaries of the 4×200-meter freestyle relay.

At the 2013 World Aquatics Championships in Barcelona, Spain, Houchin combined with Conor Dwyer, Ryan Lochte, and Ricky Berens in the 4×200-meter freestyle relay, with the team finishing in first place for the gold medal. Swimming the third leg, Houchin recorded a split of 1:45.59, and the team finished with a final time of 7:01.72.

== Personal life ==
Houchin is a Christian. Houchin has spoken about his faith saying, "I like to think I carry a quiet confidence into the water because of my relationship with Christ.

== See also ==
- List of Olympic medalists in swimming (men)
- List of University of Michigan alumni
- Michigan Wolverines
