= Sailing at the 2011 Pan American Games – Hobie 16 =

Hobie 16 class at the 2011 Pan American Games
- Venue: Vallarta Yacht Club
- Dates: October 17 - October 23
- Competitors: 16 from 8 nations

Medalists
| Gold medal | Enrique Figueroa; Victor Aponte | Puerto Rico |
| Silver medal | Bernardo Arndt; Bruno Oliveira | Brazil |
| Bronze medal | Jason Hess; Jose Hernandez | Guatemala |

The Hobie 16 class competition of the sailing events at the 2011 Pan American Games in Guadalajara were held from October 17 to October 23 at the Vallarta Yacht Club in Puerto Vallarta. The defending champion was the boat from Guatemala.

Points were assigned based on the finishing position in each race (1 for first, 2 for second, etc.). The points were totaled from the top 9 results of the first 10 races, with lower totals being better. If a sailor was disqualified or did not complete the race, 9 points were assigned for that race (as there were 8 sailors in this competition). The top 5 sailors at that point competed in the final race, with placings counting double for final score. The sailor with the lowest total score won.

== Schedule ==
All times are Central Standard Time (UTC-6).

| Date | Time | Round |
|---|---|---|
| October 17, 2011 | 13:00 | 1 and 2 races |
| October 18, 2011 | 13:00 | 3 and 4 races |
| October 19, 2011 | 13:00 | 5 and 6 races |
| October 21, 2011 | 13:00 | 7 and 8 races |
| October 22, 2011 | 13:00 | 9 and 10 races |
| October 23, 2011 | 14:40 | Medal race |

== Results ==
Race M is the medal race in which only the top 5 competitors took part. Each boat can drop its lowest result provided that all ten races are completed. If less than ten races are completed all races will count. Boats cannot drop their result in the medal race.

| Rank | Athlete | Race | | | | | | | | | | | Total Points | Net Points |
| Rank | Athlete | 1 | 2 | 3 | 4 | 5 | 6 | 7 | 8 | 9 | 10 | M | Total Points | Net Points |
|---|---|---|---|---|---|---|---|---|---|---|---|---|---|---|
| 1st place, gold medalist(s) | Puerto Rico; Enrique Figueroa; Victor Aponte | 1 | 3 | 4 | 1 | (8) | 2 | 2 | 1 | 3 | 1 | 8 | 34 | 26 |
| 2nd place, silver medalist(s) | Brazil; Bernardo Arndt; Bruno Oliveira | 2 | 2 | 5 | 6 | 2 | 1 | 1 | 3 | 1 | (8) | 4 | 35 | 27 |
| 3rd place, bronze medalist(s) | Guatemala; Jason Hess; Jose Hernandez | 5 | 4 | 2 | 5 | 1 | 5 | 3 | (9); OCS | 2 | 5 | 2 | 43 | 34 |
| 4 | Venezuela; Yamil Saba; Gonzalo Cendra | 7 | 1 | 1 | 2 | 7 | 7 | 5 | (9); OCS | 8 | 3 | 6 | 56 | 47 |
| 5 | Mexico; Javier Cabildo; Katia Real | 4 | 5 | 6 | (7) | 6 | 4 | 7 | 4 | 4 | 2 | 10 | 59 | 52 |
| 6 | United States; Gregory Thomas; John Williams | 3 | 7 | 3 | (9); DNF | 3 | 3 | 6 | 5 | 6 | 7 | – | 52 | 43 |
| 7 | Canada; Daniel Borg; Marshall Champ | (8) | 8 | 8 | 3 | 4 | 8 | 4 | 2 | 7 | 4 | – | 56 | 48 |
| 8 | Argentina; Lucas Gonzalez Smith; Moira Gonzalez Smith | 6 | 6 | 7 | 4 | 5 | 6 | 8 | (9); OCS | 5 | 6 | – | 62 | 53 |
