= Weightlifting at the 2011 Pan American Games – Men's 105 kg =

Weightlifting – Men's 105 kg at the 2011 Pan American Games
- Venue: Weightlifting Forum
- Dates: October 27
- Competitors: 8 from 8 nations

Medalists
Gold medal	Jorge Arroyo	Ecuador
Silver medal	Julio Luna	Venezuela
Bronze medal	Donald Shankle	United States

The men's 105 kg competition of the weightlifting events at the 2011 Pan American Games in Guadalajara, Mexico, was held on October 27 at the Weightlifting Forum. The defending champion was Joël MacKenzie from Cuba.

Each lifter performed in both the snatch and clean and jerk lifts, with the final score being the sum of the lifter's best result in each. The athlete received three attempts in each of the two lifts; the score for the lift was the heaviest weight successfully lifted. This weightlifting event was the second heaviest men's event at the weightlifting competition, limiting competitors to a maximum of 105 kilograms of body mass.

== Schedule ==
All times are Central Standard Time (UTC-6).

Date	Time	Round
October 27, 2011	12:00	Final

== Results ==
8 athletes from 8 countries took part.

Rank	Name	Country	Group	B.weight (kg)	Snatch (kg)	Clean & Jerk (kg)	Total (kg)
1st place, gold medalist(s)	Jorge Arroyo	Ecuador	A	101.25	185	210	395
2nd place, silver medalist(s)	Julio Luna	Venezuela	A	103.95	170	210	380
3rd place, bronze medalist(s)	Donald Shankle	United States	A	104.55	165	203	368
4	Alejandro Cisneros	Cuba	A	102.97	165	202	367
5	Luis Osuna	Mexico	A	104.04	160	185	345
6	Jorge Garcia	Chile	A	103.19	153	190	343
7	Pedro Stetsiuk	Argentina	A	103.63	158	180	338
8	Juan Carlos Marcial	Puerto Rico	A	99.87	135	160	295
