= Taekwondo at the 2011 Pan American Games – Women's +67 kg =

Taekwondo – Women's +67 kg at the 2011 Pan American Games
- Venue: CODE II Gymnasium
- Dates: October 18
- Competitors: 9 from 9 nations

Medalists
Gold medal	Glenhis Hernández	Cuba
Silver medal	Nikki Martínez	Puerto Rico
Bronze medal	Guadalupe Ruiz	Mexico
Bronze medal	Lauren Cahoon	United States

The women's +67 kg competition of the taekwondo events at the 2011 Pan American Games took place on the 18 of October at the CODE II Gymnasium. The Taekwondo at the 2007 Pan American Games#Women's Heavyweight +67 kg Pan American Games champion is María del Rosario Espinoza of Mexico, while the defending Pan American Championship, champion is Guadalupe Ruiz also of Mexico.

== Schedule ==
All times are Central Standard Time (UTC-6).

Date	Time	Round
October 18, 2011	11:00	Preliminaries
October 18, 2011	12:30	Quarterfinals
October 18, 2011	17:00	Semifinals
October 18, 2011	18:00	Final

== Results ==
Legend

- PTG – Won by Points Gap
- SUP – Won by Superiority
- OT – Won on over time (Golden Point)

=== Main bracket ===
Preliminary round
Sandra Vanegas (COL)	5
Jasmine Vokey (CAN)	2

Quarterfinals
Guadalupe Ruiz (MEX)	6
Sandra Vanegas (COL)	5
Natalia Forcada (ARG)	1
Nikki Martínez (PUR)	8
Deysy Montes de Oca (DOM)	0
Glenhis Hernández (CUB)	12
Lauren Cahoon (USA)	1 (SUP)
Natália Falavigna (BRA)	1

Semifinals
Guadalupe Ruiz (MEX)	8
Nikki Martínez (PUR)	9
Glenhis Hernández (CUB)	4
Lauren Cahoon (USA)	1

Gold medal match
Nikki Martínez (PUR)	0
Glenhis Hernández (CUB)	13 (SUP)
