= Judo at the 2011 Pan American Games – Men's 81 kg =

Men's 66 kg at the 2011 Pan American Games
- Venue: CODE II Gymnasium
- Dates: October 27
- Competitors: 10 from 10 nations

Medalists
Gold medal	Leandro Guilheiro	Brazil
Silver medal	Gadiel Miranda	Puerto Rico
Bronze medal	Emmanuel Lucenti	Argentina
Bronze medal	Antoine Valois	Canada

The men's 81 kg competition of the judo events at the 2011 Pan American Games in Guadalajara, Mexico, was held on October 27 at the CODE II Gymanasium. The defending champion was Travis Stevens of the United States.

== Schedule ==
All times are Central Standard Time (UTC-6).

Date	Time	Round
October 27, 2011	11:16	Preliminaries
October 27, 2011	12:04	Quarterfinals
October 27, 2011	13:08	Repechage
October 27, 2011	13:56	Semifinals
October 27, 2011	17:48	Bronze medal matches
October 27, 2011	18:04	Final

== Results ==
Legend

- 1st number = Ippon
- 2nd number = Waza-ari
- 3rd number = Yuko

=== Bracket ===
Preliminaries
Leandro Guilheiro (BRA)	110
Luis Retamales (CHI)	000
Harry St. Leger (USA)	000
Mervin Rodriguez (VEN)	120

Quarter Finals
Leandro Guilheiro (BRA)	101
German Velazco (PER)	000
Antoine Valois (CAN)	100
Emmanuel Lucenti (ARG)	001
Mervin Rodriguez (VEN)	010
Eduardo Avila (MEX)	000
Osmay Cruz (CUB)	000
Gadiel Miranda (PUR)	001

Semi Finals
Leandro Guilheiro (BRA)	101
Antoine Valois (CAN)	000
Mervin Rodriguez (VEN)	001
Gadiel Miranda (PUR)	010

Final
Leandro Guilheiro (BRA)	101
Gadiel Miranda (PUR)	000

=== Repechage round ===
Two bronze medals were awarded.

First round
Luis Retamales (CHI)	000
German Velazco (PER)	100
Bye
Emmanuel Lucenti (ARG)
Harry St. Leger (USA)	000
Eduardo Avila (MEX)	001
Bye
Osmay Cruz (CUB)

Semifinals
German Velazco (PER)	000
Emmanuel Lucenti (ARG)	100
Eduardo Avila (MEX)	000
Osmay Cruz (CUB)	010

Finals
Mervin Rodriguez (VEN)	000
Emmanuel Lucenti (ARG)	100
Antoine Valois (CAN)	110
Osmay Cruz (CUB)	000
