= Wrestling at the 2011 Pan American Games – Men's freestyle 120 kg =

Men's Freestyle 120 kg at the 2011 Pan American Games
- Venue: CODE II Gymnasium
- Dates: October 23
- Competitors: 8 from 8 nations

Medalists
Gold medal	Tervel Dlagnev; United States
Silver medal	Sunny Dhinsa; Canada
Bronze medal	Disney Rodriguez; Cuba
Bronze medal	Carlos Félix; Dominican Republic

The men's freestyle 120 kg competition of the wrestling events at the 2011 Pan American Games in Guadalajara, Mexico, was held on October 23 at the CODE II Gymanasium. The defending champion was Alexis Rodriguez from Cuba.

This freestyle wrestling competition consisted of a single-elimination tournament, with a repechage used to determine the winner of two bronze medals. The two finalists faced off for gold and silver medals. Each wrestler who lost to one of the two finalists moved into the repechage, culminating in a pair of bronze medal matches featuring the semifinal losers each facing the remaining repechage opponent from their half of the bracket.

Each bout consisted of up to three rounds, lasting two minutes apiece. The wrestler who scored more points in each round was the winner of that rounds; the bout finished when one wrestler had won two rounds (and thus the match).

== Schedule ==
All times are Central Standard Time (UTC-6).

Date	Time	Round
October 23, 2011	10:32	Quarterfinals
October 23, 2011	11:20	Semifinals
October 23, 2011	18:48	Bronze medal matches
October 23, 2011	18:56	Final

== Results ==
=== Finals round ===
Quarterfinals
Tervel Dlagnev (USA)	6	7
Carlos Delgado (ECU)	0	0
Disney Rodriguez (CUB)	4	4
Jesse Ruiz (MEX)	0	0
Antoine Jaoude (BRA)	0	0
Carlos Félix (DOM)	3	2
Sunny Dhinsa (CAN)	7	6
Edgardo Lopez (PUR)	0	0

Semifinals
Tervel Dlagnev (USA)	1	5
Disney Rodriguez (CUB)	0	0
Carlos Félix (DOM)	0
Sunny Dhinsa (CAN)	3

Finals
Tervel Dlagnev (USA)	2	6
Sunny Dhinsa (CAN)	0	0

=== Repechage round ===
Two bronze medals were awarded.

Repechage round 1	Bronze Medal Bout
	Disney Rodriguez (CUB)	6 4
Carlos Delgado (ECU)	Carlos Delgado (ECU)	0 0
Bye

Repechage round 1	Bronze Medal Bout
	Carlos Félix (DOM)	5 3
Edgardo Lopez (PUR)	Edgardo Lopez (PUR)	1 0
Bye
