= Boxing at the 2011 Pan American Games – Light flyweight =

Men's light flyweight at the 2011 Pan American Games
- Venue: Expo Guadalajara Arena
- Dates: October 21–28
- Competitors: 9 from 9 nations

Medalists
Gold medal	Joselito Velázquez	Mexico
Silver medal	Yosbany Veitia	Cuba
Bronze medal	Jantony Ortiz	Puerto Rico
Bronze medal	Juan Medina	Dominican Republic

The men's light flyweight competition of the boxing events at the 2011 Pan American Games in Guadalajara, Mexico, was held between October 21 and 28 at the Expo Guadalajara Arena. The defending champion was Luis Yáñez from the United States. Light flyweights were limited to those boxers weighing less than or equal to 49 kilograms.

Like all Pan American boxing events, the competition was a straight single-elimination tournament. Both semifinal losers were awarded bronze medals, so no boxers competed again after their first loss. Bouts consisted of four rounds of two minutes each, with one-minute breaks between rounds. Punches scored only if the white area on the front of the glove made full contact with the front of the head or torso of the opponent. Five judges scored each bout; three of the judges had to signal a scoring punch within one second for the punch to score. The winner of the bout was the boxer who scored the most valid punches by the end of the bout.

== Results ==
All times are Central Standard Time (UTC−6).

=== Bracket ===
Round of 16; October 21, 2011; 18:00
Junior Zarate (ARG)	5
Jantony Ortiz (PUR)	10

Quarterfinals; October 22, 2011; 14:00
Gilberto Pedroza (PAN)	6
Jantony Ortiz (PUR)	17
Yosbany Veitia (CUB)	14
David Jimenez (CRC)	2
Joselito Velázquez (MEX)	23
Ceiver Avila (COL)	13
Juan Medina (DOM)	23
Carlos Quipo (ECU)	13

Semifinals; October 25, 2011; 19:00
Jantony Ortiz (PUR)	9
Yosbany Veitia (CUB)	14
Joselito Velázquez (MEX)	32
Juan Medina (DOM)	22

Finals; October 28, 2011; 19:00
Yosbany Veitia (CUB)	12
Joselito Velázquez (MEX)	20
