= Wrestling at the 2011 Pan American Games – Men's freestyle 66 kg =

Men's Freestyle 66 kg at the 2011 Pan American Games
- Venue: CODE II Gymnasium
- Dates: October 23
- Competitors: 9 from 9 nations

Medalists
Gold medal	Liván López	Cuba
Silver medal	Pedro Soto	Puerto Rico
Bronze medal	Teyon Ware	United States
Bronze medal	Yoan Blanco	Ecuador

The men's freestyle 66 kg competition of the wrestling events at the 2011 Pan American Games in Guadalajara, Mexico, was held on October 23 at the CODE II Gymanasium. The defending champion was Geandry Garzon from Cuba.

This freestyle wrestling competition consisted of a single-elimination tournament, with a repechage used to determine the winner of two bronze medals. The two finalists faced off for gold and silver medals. Each wrestler who lost to one of the two finalists moved into the repechage, culminating in a pair of bronze medal matches featuring the semifinal losers each facing the remaining repechage opponent from their half of the bracket.

Each bout consisted of up to three rounds, lasting two minutes apiece. The wrestler who scored more points in each round was the winner of that rounds; the bout finished when one wrestler had won two rounds (and thus the match).

== Schedule ==
All times are Central Standard Time (UTC-6).

Date	Time	Round
October 23, 2011	10:00	Preliminary bout
October 23, 2011	10:32	Quarterfinals
October 23, 2011	11:20	Semifinals
October 23, 2011	11:36	Repechage round 1
October 23, 2011	18:16	Bronze medal matches
October 23, 2011	18:24	Final

== Results ==
=== Main bracket ===
1/8 Finals
Ghandi Marquez (MEX)	0	0
Pedro Soto (PUR)	1	1

Quarterfinals
Liván López (CUB)	4	4
Edison Hurtado (COL)	0	0
Ryan Lue (CAN)	4	0	0
Teyon Ware (USA)	1	1	1
Fernando Carranza (ARG)	0	0
Elvis Fuentes (VEN)	6	6
Yoan Blanco (ECU)	0	0
Pedro Soto (PUR)	3	2

Semifinals
Liván López (CUB)	5	4
Teyon Ware (USA)	0	1
Elvis Fuentes (VEN)	0	0
Pedro Soto (PUR)	2	3

Finals
Liván López (CUB)	6	5
Pedro Soto (PUR)	0	0

=== Repechage round ===
Two bronze medals were awarded.

Repechage round 1	Bronze Medal Bout
	Teyon Ware (USA)	1 4
Edison Hurtado (COL)	Edison Hurtado (COL)	1 1
Bye

Repechage Round 1	Repechage round 2		Bronze Medal Bout
			Elvis Fuentes (VEN)	0 0
			Yoan Blanco (ECU)	1 2
	Yoan Blanco (ECU)	3 2
Bye	Ghandi Marquez (MEX)	0 1
Ghandi Marquez (MEX)
