= Judo at the 2011 Pan American Games – Women's 70 kg =

Women's 70 kg at the 2011 Pan American Games
- Venue: CODE II Gymnasium
- Dates: October 27
- Competitors: 10 from 10 nations

Medalists
Gold medal	Onix Cortés	Cuba
Silver medal	Yuri Alvear	Colombia
Bronze medal	Maria Perez	Puerto Rico
Bronze medal	Maria Portela	Brazil

The women's 70 kg competition of the judo events at the 2011 Pan American Games in Guadalajara, Mexico, was held on October 27 at the CODE II Gymanasium. The defending champion was Ronda Rousey of the United States.

== Schedule ==
All times are Central Standard Time (UTC−6).

Date	Time	Round
October 27, 2011	11:08	Preliminaries
October 27, 2011	11:56	Quarterfinals
October 27, 2011	13:24	Repechage
October 27, 2011	13:48	Semifinals
October 27, 2011	17:00	Bronze medal matches
October 27, 2011	17:16	Final

== Results ==
Legend

- 1st number = Ippon
- 2nd number = Waza-ari
- 3rd number = Yuko
- Ht = Hantei (match tied, went to a judges decision)

=== Bracket ===
Preliminaries
Vanessa Chala (ECU)	010
Veronica Mendoza (ESA)	001
Kelita Zupancic (CAN)	100
Andrea Menegazzo (GUA)	000

Quarter Finals
Maria Portela (BRA)	100
Vanessa Chala (ECU)	000
Yuri Alvear (COL)	121
Maria Perez (PUR)	000
Onix Cortés (CUB)	100
Kathleen Sell (USA)	000
Kelita Zupancic (CAN)	100
Lizbeth Leon (MEX)	000

Semi Finals
Maria Portela (BRA)	000
Yuri Alvear (COL)	100
Onix Cortés (CUB)	100
Kelita Zupancic (CAN)	000

Final
Yuri Alvear (COL)	000
Onix Cortés (CUB)	001

=== Repechage round ===
Two bronze medals were awarded.

First round
Bye
Vanessa Chala (ECU)
Bye
Maria Perez (PUR)
Kathleen Sell (USA)
Bye
Andrea Menegazzo (GUA)	010
Lizbeth Leon (MEX)	010 HT

Semifinals
Vanessa Chala (ECU)	001
Maria Perez (PUR)	120
Kathleen Sell (USA)	121
Lizbeth Leon (MEX)	000

Finals
Kelita Zupancic (CAN)	000
Maria Perez (PUR)	001
Maria Portela (BRA)	101
Kathleen Sell (USA)	000
