= Weightlifting at the 2011 Pan American Games – Women's 48 kg =

Weightlifting – Women's 48 kg at the 2011 Pan American Games
- Venue: Weightlifting Forum
- Dates: October 23
- Competitors: 9 from 8 nations

Medalists
Gold medal	Lely Burgos	Puerto Rico
Silver medal	Betsi Rivas	Venezuela
Bronze medal	Katherine Mercado	Colombia

The women's 48 kg competition of the weightlifting events at the 2011 Pan American Games in Guadalajara, Mexico, was held on October 23 at the Weightlifting Forum. The defending champion was Carolina Valencia from Mexico.

Each lifter performed in both the snatch and clean and jerk lifts, with the final score being the sum of the lifter's best result in each. The athlete received three attempts in each of the two lifts; the score for the lift was the heaviest weight successfully lifted. This weightlifting event was the lightest women's event at the weightlifting competition, limiting competitors to a maximum of 48 kilograms of body mass.

== Schedule ==
All times are Central Standard Time (UTC-6).

Date	Time	Round
October 23, 2011	14:00	Final

== Results ==
9 athletes from 8 countries took part.

Rank	Name	Country	Group	B.weight (kg)	Snatch (kg)	Clean & Jerk (kg)	Total (kg)
1st place, gold medalist(s)	Lely Burgos	Puerto Rico	A	47.49	71	99	170
2nd place, silver medalist(s)	Betsi Rivas	Venezuela	A	47.34	73	96	169
3rd place, bronze medalist(s)	Katherine Mercado	Colombia	A	46.99	73	92	165
4	Carolanni Reyes	Dominican Republic	A	47.44	70	87	157
5	Génesis Murcia	El Salvador	A	47.44	68	85	153
6	Georgina Silvestre	Dominican Republic	A	46.13	70	82	152
7	Kelly Rexroad	United States	A	47.44	68	82	150
8	Maria Cavero	Argentina	A	46.73	66	80	146
9	Fiorela Ramirez	Peru	A	47.48	73	78	136
