= Boxing at the 2011 Pan American Games – Lightweight =

Men's lightweight at the 2011 Pan American Games
- Venue: Expo Guadalajara Arena
- Dates: October 22–29
- Competitors: 11 from 11 nations

Medalists
Gold medal	Yasniel Toledo	Cuba
Silver medal	Robson Conceição	Brazil
Bronze medal	Angel Suarez	Puerto Rico
Bronze medal	Angel Gutierrez	Mexico

The men's lightweight competition of the boxing events at the 2011 Pan American Games in Guadalajara, Mexico, was held between October 22 and 29 at the Expo Guadalajara Arena. The defending champion was Karl Dargan from the United States. Light welterweights were limited to those boxers weighing less than or equal to 60 kilograms.

The competition was a straight single-elimination tournament. Both semifinal losers were awarded bronze medals, so no boxers competed again after their first loss. Bouts consisted of four rounds of two minutes each, with one-minute breaks between rounds. Punches scored only if the white area on the front of the glove made full contact with the front of the head or torso of the opponent. Five judges scored each bout; three of the judges had to signal a scoring punch within one second for the punch to score. The winner of the bout was the boxer who scored the most valid punches by the end of the bout.

== Results ==
All times are Central Standard Time (UTC−6).

=== Bracket ===
Round of 16; October 22, 2011; 18:00
Yasniel Toledo (CUB)	RSC
Julio Laguna (NCA)
Robson Conceição (BRA)	18
Wellington Arias (DOM)	11
Angel Suarez (PUR)	19
César Villarraga (COL)	16

Quarterfinals; October 24, 2011; 14:00
Fradimil Macayo (VEN)	5
Yasniel Toledo (CUB)	24
Angel Gutierrez (MEX)	27
Cobia Breedy (BAR)	7
Toka Kahn-Clary (USA)	6
Robson Conceição (BRA)	21
Angel Suarez (PUR)	26
Julio Cortez (ECU)	13

Semifinals; October 26, 2011; 19:00
Yasniel Toledo (CUB)	13
Angel Gutierrez (MEX)	7
Robson Conceição (BRA)	27
Angel Suarez (PUR)	8

Finals; October 29, 2011; 19:00
Yasniel Toledo (CUB)	16
Robson Conceição (BRA)	11
