= Bowling at the 2011 Pan American Games – Men's pairs =

Men's pairs at the 2011 Pan American Games
- Venue: Bolearmo Tapatio
- Dates: October 24 – 25

Medalists
Gold medal	Bill O'Neill; Chris Barnes	United States
Silver medal	José Lander; Amleto Monacelli	Venezuela
Bronze medal	Santiago Mejía; Andrés Gómez	Colombia

The men's pairs competition of the bowling events at the 2011 Pan American Games took place between from October 24 to 25 at the Bolearmo Tapatio.

Each participant bowled twelve games in total, spread over two days with six games each day. After all games were completed, the scores were summed up and averaged. The pair achieving the highest combined total score won the gold medal.

== Results ==
Nation	Player	Block 1 (Games 1–6)									Block 2 (Games 7–12)								Grand Total	Final Rank
Nation	Player	1	2	3	4	5	6	Total	Average	Rank	7	8	9	10	11	12	Total	Average	Grand Total	Final Rank
United States	Bill O'Neill	188	210	256	245	173	237	1309	218.2	1	236	212	205	149	236	166	2513	209.4	5211	1st place, gold medalist(s)
United States	Chris Barnes	211	202	245	234	227	179	1298	216.3	1	279	202	213	248	212	246	2698	224.8	5211	1st place, gold medalist(s)
Venezuela	José Lander	180	214	210	190	215	165	1174	195.7	2	200	245	184	195	209	237	2444	203.7	5018	2nd place, silver medalist(s)
Venezuela	Amleto Monacelli	225	189	238	224	231	189	1296	216.0	2	150	245	188	279	190	226	2574	214.5	5018	2nd place, silver medalist(s)
Colombia	Santiago Mejía	206	180	174	183	186	189	1118	186.3	5	204	213	178	182	238	201	2334	194.5	4856	3rd place, bronze medalist(s)
Colombia	Andrés Gómez	201	224	212	237	227	181	1282	213.7	5	203	203	182	208	196	248	2522	210.2	4856	3rd place, bronze medalist(s)
Brazil	Marcio Vieira	183	175	210	185	188	196	1137	189.5	3	134	184	166	174	162	233	2190	182.5	4835	4
Brazil	Marcelo Suartz	220	184	245	233	213	224	1319	219.8	3	225	212	195	184	268	242	2645	220.4	4835	4
Canada	Arthur Oliver	244	171	212	199	206	263	1295	215.8	4	171	234	169	194	189	182	2434	202.8	4797	5
Canada	Mark Buffa	243	138	155	172	206	232	1146	191.0	4	210	234	223	193	166	191	2363	196.9	4797	5
Mexico	Ernesto Franco	152	202	181	208	212	202	1157	192.8	8	197	158	204	178	247	172	2313	192.8	4778	6
Mexico	Alejandro Cruz	217	167	198	185	190	220	1177	196.2	8	228	216	160	186	234	264	2465	205.4	4778	6
Puerto Rico	Andraunick Simounet	183	209	204	175	135	187	1093	182.2	15	199	201	225	223	214	157	2312	192.7	4778	6
Puerto Rico	Francisco Colon	174	169	203	209	152	191	1098	183.0	15	227	228	267	204	234	208	2466	205.5	4778	6
Dominican Republic	Rolando Sebelen	200	209	191	194	177	213	1184	197.3	7	266	170	204	181	228	235	2468	205.7	4739	8
Dominican Republic	Manuel Fernandez	233	183	159	192	178	214	1159	193.2	7	207	182	159	184	164	216	2271	189.3	4739	8
Ecuador	Mario Lemos	175	166	215	189	162	177	1084	180.7	13	143	204	224	187	169	204	2215	184.6	4674	9
Ecuador	Diogenes Saverio	210	182	173	182	179	193	1119	186.5	13	268	244	225	200	215	188	2459	204.9	4674	9
Costa Rica	Mario Valverde	202	203	180	178	188	166	1117	186.2	11	189	236	185	178	209	152	2266	188.8	4664	10
Costa Rica	Alejandro Reyna	192	159	201	180	223	146	1101	183.5	11	165	275	278	154	227	198	2398	199.8	4664	10
Panama	Diego Esposito	206	200	138	192	212	218	1166	194.3	6	159	235	131	200	188	204	2283	190.3	4544	11
Panama	Juan Narvaez	243	173	225	169	179	198	1187	197.8	6	169	156	186	182	180	201	2261	188.4	4544	11
Bermuda	Levinc Samuels	190	219	192	187	192	197	1177	196.2	9	185	174	193	257	157	236	2379	198.3	4538	12
Bermuda	Damien Matthews	194	188	195	198	168	142	1085	180.8	9	182	179	170	194	160	189	2159	179.9	4538	12
Guatemala	Mauricio Piñol	165	236	176	173	175	161	1086	180.7	14	197	234	258	189	177	163	2204	183.7	4511	13
Guatemala	Miguel Aguilar	166	216	203	196	168	158	1107	184.5	14	193	222	212	182	200	191	2307	192.3	4511	13
Peru	Victor Tateishi	197	179	169	194	192	172	1103	183.8	10	155	203	168	181	178	226	2214	184.5	4358	14
Peru	Adolfo Vargas	202	181	207	206	162	194	1152	192.0	10	156	1179	179	154	176	148	2144	178.7	4358	14
Bolivia	Ignacio Rojas	192	182	200	146	193	172	1085	180.7	12	155	171	201	190	154	214	2170	180.8	4325	15
Bolivia	Sebastian Nemtala	233	141	168	226	148	205	1121	186.8	12	178	169	191	167	175	154	2155	179.6	4325	15
El Salvador	Angel Ortiz	160	174	167	164	187	180	1032	172.0	16	168	240	184	198	147	190	2159	179.9	4279	16
El Salvador	Francisco Sanchez	189	192	172	148	144	179	1024	170.7	16	137	191	193	197	170	208	2120	176.7	4279	16
