= Raúl Martínez Colomer =

Puerto Rican swimmer (born 1988)

Personal information
- Born: April 11, 1988 (age 38) Humacao, Puerto Rico

Sport
- Sport: Swimming

Raúl Martínez Colomer (born April 11, 1988) is a Puerto Rican swimmer. He competed at the 2012 Summer Olympics in the Men's 200 metre freestyle, finishing in 38th place in the heats, failing to qualify for the semi-finals.
