= Miguel "Ali" Berdiel =

Puerto Rican basketball player

Miguel Ali Berdiel
Personal information
- Born: December 27, 1983 (age 42) Ponce, Puerto Rico
- Listed height: 6 ft 6 in (1.98 m)
- Listed weight: 200 lb (91 kg)

Career information
- College: Valparaiso (2001-2006)
- NBA draft: 2006: undrafted
- Playing career: 1999–2023
- Position: Shooting guard

Career history
- 1999–2000: Leones de Ponce
- 2001–2002: Maratonistas de Coamo
- 2006: Arkansas RimRockers
- 2006–2007: Utah Eagles
- 2007: Dexia Mons-Hainaut
- 2007: Caciques de Humacao
- 2007–2008: Albuquerque Thunderbirds
- 2008–2009: Cangrejeros de Santurce (basketball)
- 2008–2009: KK Zlatorog Laško
- 2010–2011: Caciques de Humacao
- 2011: AEK Larnaca B.C.
- 2012–2016: Vaqueros de Bayamón
- 2015: Leones de Managua
- 2015: Fuerza Regia
- 2018: Leones de Ponce (basketball)
- 2017–2018: Cariduros de Fajardo
- 2019: Real Estelí Baloncesto
- 2019: Brujos de Guayama
- 2019: Club Trouville
- 2020: Mets de Guaynabo (basketball)
- 2021: Gigantes de Carolina
- 2022–2023: Leones de Ponce

Career highlights
- 5x BSN All-Star (2007, 2010, 2017, 2018, 2019); 2x BSN All-Defensive Team (2010, 2015); 2x BSN Steals Leader (2010, 2015); Puerto Rico Streetball All-Star (2012); BSN Most Improved Player (2010); BSN Comeback Player of the Year (2007); First-team All-MCC Tournament (2004); Second-team All-MCC Regular Season (2004)
Medals
Men's basketball
Representing Puerto Rico
Pan American Games
Gold medal – first place	2011 Mexico	Team competition
Silver medal – second place	2007 Rio de Janeiro	Team competition
Centrobasket
Gold medal – first place	2010 Dominican Republic	Team competition
Central American and Caribbean Games
Bronze medal – third place	2014 Guadalajara	Team competition
FIBA CBC Championship
Gold medal – first place	2007 Puerto Rico	Team competition

Miguel Ali Berdiel (born December 27, 1983) is a Puerto Rican former professional basketball player who played for over 20 years in the NCAA, the CBA, the NBA G League, and most notably in the Baloncesto Superior Nacional (BSN). Internationally, he has played in Belgium, Slovenia, Cyprus, Mexico and Uruguay. Berdiel was a member of the Puerto Rico national basketball team from 2007 until 2014.

== Brief biography ==
Berdiel played his college career with Valparaiso from 2001 to 2006. During his college career he earned the Second Team All-Mid-Continent.

Berdiel has played professionally in the National Superior Basketball League of Puerto Rico since 1999.

During the 2006–2007 season, Berdiel played with the Utah Eagles of the Continental Basketball Association (CBA). Berdiel also played internationally in Belgium.

On 11 June 2007, Berdiel signed a contract with the New York Knicks of the NBA to participate in the 2007 Summer League. The Knicks had shown interest in Berdiel during the 2006–2007 season having offering him a 10-Day contract in which he was not released by the Dexia-Mons Hainaut of the Belgium league and could not accept the offer.

During the summer of 2007, Berdiel participated in the Las Vegas Summer Pro League with the New York Knicks. After playing in the Summer Pro League he continued to Brazil for the 2007 Pan-American Games as a member of the Puerto Rican National Basketball Team winning the silver medal.

On 1 Nov 2007, Berdiel was drafted for a second season in row in the NBDL Draft. He was chosen by the Albuquerque Thunderbirds with the 12th pick in the sixth round. On May 21, 2008, the Indiana Pacers invited Berdiel to participate with the team in the NBA's summer rookie league.

== Playing Style ==
Berdiel is a point guard listed at 6 feet 6 inches (1.98 m). His playing style includes playmaking and defensive contributions. He led the BSN in steals twice and received all-defensive team honors.

== Career stats ==
Berdiel's NCAA stats in 124 games are 981 points with a 7.9 PPG, 507 assists with a 4.1 APG, 340 rebounds with a 2.7 RPG, 176 steals with a 1.4 SPG, .391 field goal percentage, .668 free-throw percentage, and .338 3-point percentage.
