= Table tennis at the 2011 Pan American Games – Women's singles =

The women's singles table tennis event at the 2011 Pan American Games will be held from October 18–21 at the CODE Dome in Guadalajara, Mexico.

== Medals ==
Gold	Zhang Mo; Canada
Silver	Wu Xue; Dominican Republic
Bronze	Lily Zhang; United States
Bronze	Ariel Hsing; United States

== Round robin ==
The round robin will be used as a qualification round. The forty participants will be split into groups of four. The top two players from each group will advance to the first round of playoffs. Groups will be announced at the technical meeting the day before the competition begins.

=== Group A ===
Player	Pld	W	L	GF	GA	PF	PA	Points
Wu Xue (DOM)	3	3	0	12	1	143	62	6
Leisy Jimenez (CUB)	3	2	1	8	7	133	134	5
Mercedes Madrid (MEX)	3	1	2	4	10	107	147	4
Erica Wu (USA)	3	0	3	6	12	143	183	3

=== Group B ===
Player	Pld	W	L	GF	GA	PF	PA	Points
Lily Zhang (USA)	3	3	0	12	1	141	86	6
Francesca Vargas (PER)	3	2	1	9	4	130	119	5
Lisi Castillo (CUB)	3	1	2	4	8	113	115	4
Karla Perez (ESA)	3	0	3	0	12	68	132	3

=== Group C ===
Player	Pld	W	L	GF	GA	PF	PA	Points
Ariel Hsing (USA)	3	3	0	12	2	152	87	6
Ruaida Ezzeddine (VEN)	3	2	1	8	6	127	131	5
Rheann Chung (TRI)	3	1	2	8	11	171	194	4
Analdy Lopez (GUA)	3	0	3	3	12	129	167	3

=== Group D ===
Player	Pld	W	L	GF	GA	PF	PA	Points
Zhang Mo (CAN)	3	3	0	12	1	146	80	6
Glendys Gonzalez (CUB)	3	2	1	8	6	133	118	5
Maria Soto (PER)	3	1	2	5	9	115	141	4
Monica Serrano (MEX)	3	0	3	3	12	110	165	3

=== Group E ===
Player	Pld	W	L	GF	GA	PF	PA	Points
Ligia Silva (BRA)	3	2	1	11	4	154	118	5
Luo Anqi (CAN)	3	2	1	11	9	198	194	5
Luisa Zuluaga (COL)	3	2	1	8	9	159	162	5
Mabelyn Enriquez (GUA)	3	0	3	4	12	132	169	3

=== Group F ===
Player	Pld	W	L	GF	GA	PF	PA	Points
Paula Medina (COL)	3	3	0	12	0	135	87	6
Berta Rodriguez (CHI)	3	2	1	8	5	128	107	5
Eva Brito (DOM)	3	1	2	5	9	116	126	4
Sandra Orellana (ESA)	3	0	3	1	12	83	142	3

=== Group G ===
Player	Pld	W	L	GF	GA	PF	PA	Points
Yadira Silva (MEX)	3	3	0	12	6	185	154	6
Caroline Kumahara (BRA)	3	2	1	10	7	164	142	5
Shirley Fu (CAN)	3	1	2	8	9	163	170	4
Daniely Rios (PUR)	3	0	3	4	12	124	170	3

=== Group H ===
Player	Pld	W	L	GF	GA	PF	PA	Points
Fabiola Ramos (VEN)	3	3	0	12	1	140	90	6
Johana Araque (COL)	3	2	1	8	6	139	132	5
Angela Mori (PER)	3	1	2	4	11	134	161	4
Judith Morales (CHI)	3	0	3	6	12	156	186	3

=== Group I ===
Player	Pld	W	L	GF	GA	PF	PA	Points
Johenny Valdez (DOM)	3	3	0	12	7	184	161	6
Jessica Yamada (BRA)	3	2	1	11	7	177	159	5
Wang De Ying (ESA)	3	1	2	7	9	130	149	4
Carelyn Cordero (PUR)	3	0	3	5	12	141	163	3

=== Group J ===
Player	Pld	W	L	GF	GA	PF	PA	Points
Paulina Vega (CHI)	3	3	0	12	1	147	103	6
Andrea Estrada (GUA)	3	2	1	8	8	145	144	5
Jerica Marrero (PUR)	3	1	2	5	10	130	147	4
Luisana Perez (VEN)	3	0	3	6	12	153	181	3

== Playoffs ==
=== Finals ===
Semifinals						Final
Wu Xue (DOM)	11	11	11	5	12
Ariel Hsing (USA) (bronze)	6	6	5	11	10	Wu Xue (DOM) (silver)	10	9	11	8	11	3
Zhang Mo (CAN)	11	4	11	11	11	Zhang Mo (CAN) (gold)	12	11	9	11	7	11
Lily Zhang (USA) (bronze)	4	11	6	7	6

=== Top half ===
First Round
Glendys Gonzalez (CUB)	12	7	6	2	10
Caroline Kumahara (BRA)	10	11	11	11	12
Jessica Yamada (BRA)	8	11	11	11	11
Francesca Vargas (PER)	11	4	4	5	7

Second Round
Wu Xue (DOM)	11	11	11	9	11
Caroline Kumahara (BRA)	6	7	7	11	8
Paulina Vega (CHI)	11	11	11	11
Paula Medina (COL)	8	3	5	5
Ligia Silva (BRA)	11	11	11	11
Johana Araque (COL)	8	4	6	4
Jessica Yamada (BRA)	5	11	6	11	10	11	10
Ariel Hsing (USA)	11	7	11	3	12	7	12

Quarterfinals
Wu Xue (DOM)	11	11	11	11
Paulina Vega (CHI)	8	5	2	4
Ligia Silva (BRA)	11	11	10	11	10	11	8
Ariel Hsing (USA)	7	9	12	6	12	13	11

Semifinals
Wu Xue (DOM)	11	11	11	5	12
Ariel Hsing (USA)	6	6	5	11	10

=== Bottom half ===
First Round
Leisy Jimenez (CUB)	12	11	8	11	11	13
Berta Rodriguez (CHI)	10	9	11	13	9	11
Andrea Estrada (GUA)	11	10	14	2	11	6	6
Luo Anqi (CAN)	4	12	12	11	9	11	11

Second Round
Zhang Mo (CAN)	11	11	12	11	11
Leisy Jimenez (CUB)	5	9	14	6	5
Ruaida Ezzeddine (VEN)	9	7	8	6
Yadira Silva (MEX)	11	11	11	11
Fabiola Ramos (VEN)	11	11	11	11
Johenny Valdez (DOM)	6	8	7	9
Luo Anqi (CAN)	11	7	5	6	7
Lily Zhang (USA)	8	11	11	11	11

Quarterfinals
Zhang Mo (CAN)	11	11	11	9	11
Yadira Silva (MEX)	9	5	3	11	7
Fabiola Ramos (VEN)	6	4	9	8
Lily Zhang (USA)	11	11	11	11

Semifinals
Zhang Mo (CAN)	11	4	11	11	11
Lily Zhang (USA)	4	11	6	7	6
