= Table tennis at the 2011 Pan American Games – Women's team =

Table tennis – Women's team at the 2011 Pan American Games
- Venue: CODE Dome
- Dates: 15–17 October 2011
- Competitors: 36 from 12 nations

Medalists
Gold medal	Wu Xue; Johenny Valdez; Eva Brito	Dominican Republic
Silver medal	Fabiola Ramos; Ruaida Ezzeddine; Luisana Perez	Venezuela
Bronze medal	Ariel Hsing, Lily Zhang, Erica Wu	United States
Bronze medal	Paula Medina, Luisa Zuluaga, Johana Araque	Colombia

The women's team competition of the table tennis events at the 2011 Pan American Games will be held between 15 and 17 October 2011at the CODE Dome in Guadalajara, Mexico. The defending Pan American Games champion is team United States (Gao Jun, Wang Chen and Tawny Banh).

== Round robin ==
The round robin will be used as a qualification round. The twelve teams will be split into groups of four. The top two teams from each group will advance to the first round of playoffs.

=== Group A ===
Nation	Pld	W	L	GF	GA
United States	2	2	0	6	2
Dominican Republic	2	1	1	5	4
Peru	2	0	2	1	6

15 October; 10:00	Report	United States	3–0	Peru	CODE Dome
Score by game:
Ariel Hsing	3–1	Angela Mori
Lily Zhang	3–1	Maria Soto
Erica Wu/Ariel Hsing	3–1	Francesca Vargas/Maria Soto

15 October; 14:00	Report	United States	3–2	Dominican Republic	CODE Dome
15 October; 14:00	Report	Score by game:			CODE Dome
15 October; 14:00	Report	Ariel Hsing	0–3	Wu Xue	CODE Dome
Lily Zhang			3–0	Johenny Valdez
Erica Wu/Lily Zhang			3–1	Eva Brito/Johenny Valdez
Erica Wu			0–3	Wu Xue
Ariel Hsing			3–0	Eva Brito
			–

15 October; 18:00	Report	Dominican Republic	3–1	Peru	CODE Dome
Score by game:
Eva Brito	3–1	Angela Mori
Wu Xue	3–1	Maria Soto
Johenny Valdez/Eva Brito	2–3	Francesca Vargas/Maria Soto
Johenny Valdez	3–0	Angela Mori

=== Group B ===
Nation	Pld	W	L	GF	GA
Brazil	2	2	0	6	3
Cuba	2	1	1	5	5
Mexico	2	0	2	3	6

15 October; 10:00	Report	Mexico	1–3	Brazil	CODE Dome
Score by game:
Yadira Silva	3–2	Jessica Yamada
Mercedes Madrid	0–3	Ligia Silva
Monica Serrano/Mercedes Madrid	1–3	Caroline Kumahara/Jessica Yamada
Yadira Silva	2–3	Caroline Kumahara

15 October; 14:00
Ligia Silva
Caroline Kumahara/Jessica Yamada
Caroline Kumahara
Ligia Silva

Brazil	3–2	Cuba	CODE Dome
Score by game:
Jessica Yamada	3–0	Leisy Jimenez
1–3	Lisi Castillo
1–3	Glendys Gonzalez/Leisy Jimenez
3–0	Lisi Castillo
3–0	Glendys Gonzalez
–

15 October; 18:00
Lisi Castillo
Leisy Jimenez/Glendys Gonzalet
Leisy Jimenez
Lisi Castillo

Cuba	3–2	Mexico	CODE Dome
Score by game:
Glendy Gonzalez	1–3	Yadira Silva
3–0	Monica Serrano
3–2	Mercedes Madrid/Monica Serrano
1–3	Yadira Silva
3–0	Mercedes Madrid
–

=== Group C ===
Nation	Pld	W	L	GF	GA
Canada	2	2	0	6	1
Chile	2	1	1	4	3
Guatemala	2	0	2	0	6

15 October; 10:00	Report	Canada	3–0	Guatemala	CODE Dome
Score by game:
Zhang Mo	3–0	Andrea Estrada
Anqi Luo	3–2	Mabelyn Enriquez
Shirley Fu/Anqi Luo	3–1	Analdy Lopez/Mabelyn Enriquez

15 October; 14:00
Anqi Luo
Shirley Fu/Anqi Luo
Zhang Mo

Canada	3–1	Chile	CODE Dome
Score by game:
Zhang Mo	3–1	Judith Morales
3–2	Paulina Vega
0–3	Berta Rodriguez/Paulina Vega
3–0	Berta Rodriguez

15 October; 18:00
Berta Rodriguez
Judith Morales/Berta Rodriguez

Chile	3–0	Guatemala	CODE Dome
Score by game:
Paulina Vega	3–0	Mabelyn Enriquez
3–2	Andrea Estrada
3–1	Analdy Lopez/Mabelyn Enriquez

=== Group D ===
Nation	Pld	W	L	GF	GA
Venezuela	2	2	0	6	2
Colombia	2	1	1	4	4
El Salvador	2	0	2	2	6

15 October; 10:00	Report	El Salvador	1–3	Colombia	CODE Dome
Score by game:
Wang De Ying	3–1	Paula Medina
Sanra Orellana	0–3	Johana Araque
Karla Perez/Wang De Ying	1–3	Luisa Zuluga/Johana Araque
Sanra Orellana	0–3	Luisa Zuluga

15 October; 14:00	Report	Colombia	1–3	Venezuela	CODE Dome
Score by game:
Johana Araque	2–3	Fabiola Ramos
Paula Medina	3–0	Luisana Perez
Johana Araque/Luisa Zuluga	1–3	Luisana Perez/Ruaida Ezzeddine
Luisa Zuluga	0–3	Fabiola Ramos

15 October; 18:00	Report	Venezuela	3–1	El Salvador	CODE Dome
Score by game:
Fabiola Ramos	3–1	Karla Perez
Luisana Perez	3–2	Wang De Ying
Luisana Perez/Ruaida Ezzeddine	2–3	Sanra Orellana/Wang De Ying
Fabiola Ramos	3–1	Sanra Orellana

== Playoffs ==
Quarterfinals
United States	3	3	1	3
Chile	0	1	3	0
Cuba	3	1	1	3	1
Venezuela	2	3	3	0	3
Canada	3	1	0	3	0
Dominican Republic	1	3	3	0	3
Colombia	3	2	3	3
Brazil	0	3	2	2

Semifinals
United States (bronze)	3	0	1	3	0
Venezuela	0	3	3	1	3
Dominican Republic	3	3	1	3
Colombia (bronze)	0	1	3	0

Final
Venezuela (silver)	0	2	3	3	0
Dominican Republic (gold)	3	3	0	0	3

=== Quarterfinals ===
16 October; 12:00	Report	United States	3–1	Chile	CODE Dome
Score by game:
Ariel Hsing	3–0	Judith Morales
Lily Zhang	3–1	Paulina Vega
Erica Wu/Lily Zhang	1–3	Berta Rodriguez/Paulina Vega
Ariel Hsing	3–0	Paulina Vega

16 October; 12:00	Report	Cuba	2–3	Venezuela	CODE Dome
16 October; 12:00	Report	Score by game:			CODE Dome
16 October; 12:00	Report	Lisi Castillo	3–2	Ruaida Ezzeddine	CODE Dome
Leisy Jimenez			1–3	Fabiola Ramos
Glendys Gonzalez/Leisy Jimenez			1–3	Luisana Perez/Ruaida Ezzeddine
Lisi Castillo			3–0	Luisana Perez
Glendys Gonzalez			1–3	Fabiola Ramos
			–

16 October; 12:00	Report	Canada	2–3	Dominican Republic	CODE Dome
16 October; 12:00	Report	Score by game:			CODE Dome
16 October; 12:00	Report	Zhang Mo	3–1	Wu Xue	CODE Dome
Luo Anqi			1–3	Eva Brito
Shirley Fu/Luo Anqi			0–3	Johenny Valdez/Wu Xue
Zhang Mo			3–0	Johenny Valdez
Shirley Fu			0–3	Eva Brito
			–

16 October; 12:00	Report	Colombia	3–1	Brazil	CODE Dome
Score by game:
Paula Medina	3–0	Jessica Yamada
Luisa Zuluaga	2–3	Caroline Kumahara
Johana Araque/Luisa Zuluaga	3–2	Ligia Silva/Jessica Yamada
Johana Araque	3–2	Caroline Kumahara

=== Semifinals ===
16 October; 16:00	Report	(bronze) United States	2–3	Venezuela	CODE Dome
16 October; 16:00	Report	Score by game:			CODE Dome
16 October; 16:00	Report	Ariel Hsing	3–0	Ruaida Ezzeddine	CODE Dome
Lily Zhang			0–3	Fabiola Ramos
Erica Wu/Ariel Hsing			1–3	Luisana Perez/Ruaida Ezzeddine
Lily Zhang			3–1	Luisana Perez
Erica Wu			0–3	Fabiola Ramos
			–

16 October; 16:00	Report	Dominican Republic	3–1	Colombia (bronze)	CODE Dome
Score by game:
Wu Xue	3–0	Paula Medina
Eva Brito	3–1	Luisa Zuluaga
Johenny Valdez/Eva Brito	1–3	Johana Araque/Luisa Zuluaga
Wu Xue	3–0	Johana Araque

=== Final ===
17 October; 12:00	Report	Venezuela	2–3	Dominican Republic	CODE Dome
17 October; 12:00	Report	Score by game:			CODE Dome
17 October; 12:00	Report	Fabiola Ramos	0–3	Wu Xue	CODE Dome
Ruaida Ezzeddine			2–3	Eva Brito
Luisana Perez/Ruaida Ezzeddine			3–0	Johenny Valdez/Eva Brito
Fabiola Ramos			3–0	Johenny Valdez
Luisana Perez			0–3	Wu Xue
			–
