= Table tennis at the 2015 Pan American Games – Women's singles =

Table tennis – Women's singles at the 2015 Pan American Games
- Venue: Atos Markham Pan Am Centre
- Dates: July 22–25
- Competitors: 40 from 15 nations

Medalists
Gold medal	Jennifer Wu	United States
Silver medal	Gui Lin	Brazil
Bronze medal	Caroline Kumahara	Brazil
Bronze medal	Lily Zhang	United States

The Women's singles table tennis event at the 2015 Pan American Games were held from July 22 to 25 at the Atos Markham Pan Am Centre in Toronto, Canada. The winner of each the individual events qualify to compete at the 2016 Summer Olympics in Rio de Janeiro, Brazil.

== Schedule ==
All times are Central Standard Time (UTC-6).

Date	Time	Round
July 22, 2015	10:00	Round Robin
July 23, 2015	10:00	Round Robin
July 24, 2015	16:00	First Round
July 24, 2015	19:00	Second Round
July 25, 2015	10:00	Quarterfinals
July 25, 2015	12:00	Semifinals
July 25, 2015	18:10	Final

== Results ==
=== Round Robin ===
The round robin was used as a qualification round. The forty participants were split into groups of four. The top two players from each group advanced to the first round of playoffs. Groups were announced at the technical meeting the day before the competition began.

==== Group A ====
Player	Pld	W	L	GF	GA	PF	PA	Points
Lily Zhang (USA)	3	3	0	12	0	134	80	6
Melanie Diaz (PUR)	3	2	1	8	7	130	132	5
Eunice Galvez (ECU)	3	1	2	5	10	127	152	4
Katherine Low (CHI)	3	0	3	4	12	132	159	3

==== Group B ====
Player	Pld	W	L	GF	GA	PF	PA	Points
Zhang Mo (CAN)	3	3	0	12	1	143	67	6
Natalia Castellano (CHI)	3	2	1	9	9	166	176	5
Leisy Jimenez (CUB)	3	1	2	7	8	136	147	4
Andrea Montufar (GUA)	3	0	3	2	12	96	151	3

==== Group C ====
Player	Pld	W	L	GF	GA	PF	PA	Points
Gui Lin (BRA)	3	3	0	12	1	144	100	6
Camila Arguelles (ARG)	3	2	1	9	10	185	178	5
Alicia Cote (CAN)	3	1	2	7	9	144	159	4
Angela Mori (PER)	3	0	3	4	12	120	156	3

==== Group D ====
Player	Pld	W	L	GF	GA	PF	PA	Points
Jennifer Wu (USA)	3	3	0	12	1	138	82	6
Yadira Silva (MEX)	3	2	1	9	5	140	111	5
Eva Brito (DOM)	3	1	2	4	9	121	138	4
Andrea Estrada (GUA)	3	0	3	2	12	85	153	3

==== Group E ====
Player	Pld	W	L	GF	GA	PF	PA	Points
Caroline Kumahara (BRA)	3	3	0	12	4	165	112	6
Jiaqi Zheng (USA)	3	2	1	11	4	158	132	5
Roxy Gonzalez (VEN)	3	1	2	4	10	100	132	4
Carelyn Cordero (PUR)	3	0	3	3	12	106	153	3

==== Group F ====
Player	Pld	W	L	GF	GA	PF	PA	Points
Lígia Silva (BRA)	3	3	0	12	2	149	117	6
Idalys Lovet (CUB)	3	2	1	9	8	172	152	5
Paulina Vega (CHI)	3	1	2	8	9	149	153	4
Mercedes Madrid (MEX)	3	0	3	2	12	103	151	3

==== Group G ====
Player	Pld	W	L	GF	GA	PF	PA	Points
Adriana Diaz (PUR)	3	3	0	12	4	170	122	6
Angie Umbacia (COL)	3	2	1	9	8	148	150	5
Lisi Castillo (CUB)	3	1	2	9	8	162	160	4
Agustina Iwasa (ARG)	3	0	3	2	12	101	149	3

==== Group H ====
Player	Pld	W	L	GF	GA	PF	PA	Points
Anqi Luo (CAN)	3	3	0	12	3	155	104	6
Gremlis Arvelo (VEN)	3	2	1	8	5	122	110	5
Gabriela Soto (PER)	3	1	2	4	11	112	154	4
Yasiris Ortiz (DOM)	3	0	3	7	12	172	193	3

==== Group I ====
Player	Pld	W	L	GF	GA	PF	PA	Points
Paula Medina (COL)	3	3	0	12	5	175	140	6
Johenny Valdez (DOM)	3	2	1	10	9	153	178	5
Ana Codina (ARG)	3	1	2	9	8	159	143	4
Janina Nieto (PER)	3	0	3	3	12	121	147	3

==== Group J ====
Player	Pld	W	L	GF	GA	PF	PA	Points
Lady Ruano (COL)	3	3	0	12	5	173	146	6
Maria Lorenzotti (URU)	3	2	1	11	6	167	137	5
Monica Serrano (MEX)	3	1	2	4	8	102	113	4
Mabelyn Enriquez (GUA)	3	0	3	4	12	120	166	3

=== Playoffs ===
==== Top half ====
First Round
Y Silva (MEX)	11	10	11	6	12	7	4
N Castellano (CHI)	9	12	8	11	10	11	11
J Valdez (DOM)	11	2	9	8
J Zheng (USA)	13	11	11	11

Second Round
L Zhang (USA)	11	11	11	11
N Castellano (CHI)	4	1	4	4
L Ruano (COL)	5	8	11	3	11	11	14
L Silva (BRA)	11	11	8	11	8	9	12
A Luo (CAN)	2	11	10	11	11	11
A Umbacia (COL)	11	5	12	6	8	2
J Zheng (USA)	11	5	11	8	8	6
L Gui (BRA)	9	11	8	11	11	11

Quarterfinals
L Zhang (USA)	11	11	11	11
L Ruano (COL)	7	6	8	4
A Luo (CAN)	11	4	12	7	8	8
L Gui (BRA)	6	11	10	11	11	11

Semifinals
L Zhang (USA)	11	8	10	5	13	11	7
L Gui (BRA)	8	11	12	11	11	2	11

==== Bottom half ====
First Round
I Lovet (CUB)	11	11	8	7	11	6	9
G Arvelo (VEN)	4	5	11	11	4	11	11
C Arguelles (ARG)	8	11	7	8	11	9
M Diaz (PUR)	11	8	11	11	9	11

Second Round
Y Wu (USA)	9	11	11	11	11
M Lorenzotti (URU)	11	9	6	4	6
G Arvelo (VEN)	8	11	10	11	11
A Diaz (PUR)	11	4	12	13	13
C Kumahara (BRA)	9	12	12	8	4	11	11
P Medina (COL)	11	10	10	11	11	7	5
M Diaz (PUR)	9	2	6	6
M Zhang (CAN)	11	11	11	11

Quarterfinals
Y Wu (USA)	14	11	8	11	11
A Diaz (PUR)	12	5	11	7	5
C Kumahara (BRA)	11	11	11	8	11
M Zhang (CAN)	9	8	8	11	8

Semifinals
Y Wu (USA)	11	11	11	11
C Kumahara (BRA)	3	4	8	7

==== Final ====
Semifinals								Gold medal match
Lily Zhang (USA)	11	8	10	5	13	11	7
Gui Lin (BRA)	8	11	12	11	11	2	11	Gui Lin (BRA)	8	8	11	11	12	9	7
Jennifer Wu (USA)	11	11	11	11				Jennifer Wu (USA)	11	11	4	8	10	11	11
Caroline Kumahara (BRA)	3	4	8	7
