= Table tennis at the 2015 Pan American Games =

- Table tennis pictogram for the games
- Venue: Atos Markham Pan Am Centre
- Dates: July 19–25
- No. of events: 4 (2 men, 2 women)
- Competitors: 80 from 16 nations

Table tennis competitions at the 2015 Pan American Games in Toronto were held from July 19 to 25 at the Markham Pan Am Centre (Atos Markham Pan Am Centre) in Markham. Due to naming rights, the arena was known as the latter for the duration of the games. A total of four table tennis events were held: two each for men and women.

The winners of each the individual events, provided they are not already qualified, qualified to compete at the 2016 Summer Olympics in Rio de Janeiro, Brazil.

== Venue ==
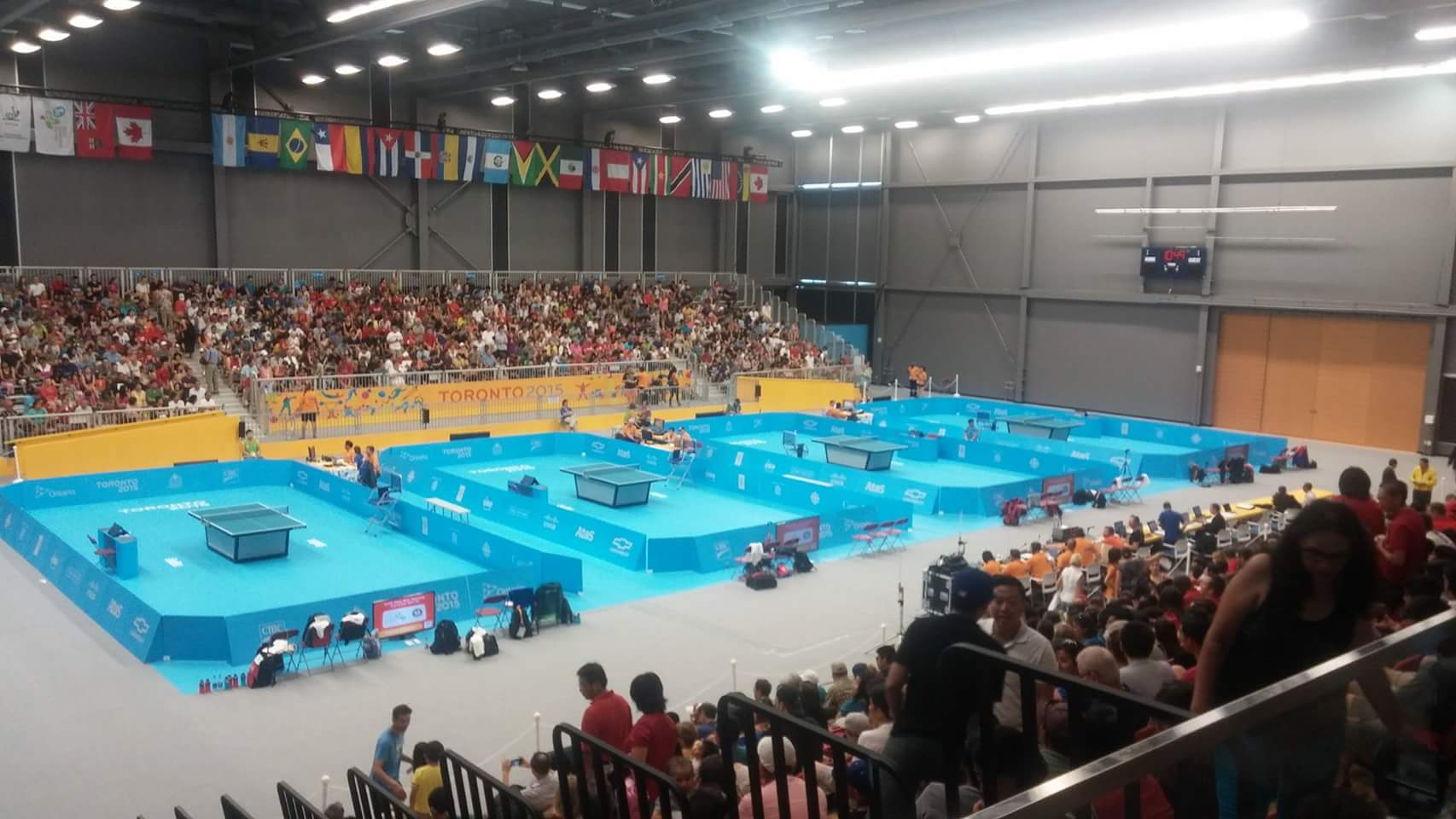
The Markham Pan Am Centre (Atos Markham Pan Am Centre), in Markham, was the venue for the table tennis competitions

The competitions took place at the Atos Markham Pan Am Centre (Markham Pan Am Centre) located in the city of Markham, about 31 kilometers from the athletes village. The arena had capacity of 2,000 people per session (1,000 permanent seating + 1,000 temporary seats). The venue also hosted badminton competitions earlier during the games. The venue also hosted the water polo competitions, but in the other side of the centre (an Olympic sized pool).

== Competition schedule ==
The following is the competition schedule for the table tennis competitions:

P	Preliminaries	R32	Round of 32	R16	Round of 16	¼	Quarterfinals	½	Semifinals	F	Final

Event↓/Date →	Sun 19	Mon 20		Tue 21		Wed 22	Thu 23	Fri 24			Sat 25		
Men's singles						P	P	P	R32	R16	¼	½	F
Men's team	P	P	¼	½	F								
Women's singles						P	P	P	R32	R16	¼	½	F
Women's team	P	P	¼	½	F								

== Medal table ==
* Host nation (Canada)

Rank	Nation	Gold	Silver	Bronze	Total
1	Brazil	2	3	2	7
2	United States	2	0	1	3
3	Paraguay	0	1	0	1
4	Canada*	0	0	3	3
5	Puerto Rico	0	0	2	2
Totals (5 entries)		4	4	8	16

== Medalists ==
Event	Gold	Silver	Bronze
Men's singles	Hugo Calderano; Brazil	Gustavo Tsuboi; Brazil	Thiago Monteiro; Brazil
Men's singles	Hugo Calderano; Brazil	Gustavo Tsuboi; Brazil	Eugene Wang; Canada
Men's team	Brazil; Hugo Calderano; Thiago Monteiro; Gustavo Tsuboi	Paraguay; Marcelo Aguirre; Axel Gavilan; Alejandro Toranzos	Canada; Marko Medjugorac; Pierre-Luc Thériault; Eugene Wang
Men's team	Brazil; Hugo Calderano; Thiago Monteiro; Gustavo Tsuboi	Paraguay; Marcelo Aguirre; Axel Gavilan; Alejandro Toranzos	Puerto Rico; Brian Afanador; Héctor Berríos; Daniel González
Women's singles	Jennifer Wu; United States	Gui Lin; Brazil	Caroline Kumahara; Brazil
Women's singles	Jennifer Wu; United States	Gui Lin; Brazil	Lily Zhang; United States
Women's team	United States; Lily Zhang; Jennifer Wu; Jiaqi Zheng	Brazil; Gui Lin; Caroline Kumahara; Lígia Silva	Canada; Alicia Cote; Anqi Luo; Zhang Mo
Women's team	United States; Lily Zhang; Jennifer Wu; Jiaqi Zheng	Brazil; Gui Lin; Caroline Kumahara; Lígia Silva	Puerto Rico; Carelyn Cordero; Adriana Diaz; Melanie Diaz

== Participating nations ==
A total of 16 countries qualified athletes. The number of athletes a nation has entered is in parentheses beside the name of the country.

- Argentina (6)
- Brazil (6)
- Canada (6)
- Chile (6)
- Colombia (3)
- Cuba (6)
- Dominican Republic (6)
- Ecuador (4)
- Guatemala (6)
- Mexico (6)
- Paraguay (3)
- Peru (6)
- Puerto Rico (6)
- United States (6)
- Uruguay (1)
- Venezuela (3)

== Qualification ==
A total of 80 athletes (40 men and 40 women) qualified to compete at the games. A nation may enter a maximum of three athletes per gender. As host nation, Canada automatically qualified a full team of six athletes. All other athletes qualified at the qualification tournament in March 2015.

== See also ==
- Table tennis at the 2015 Parapan American Games
- Table tennis at the 2016 Summer Olympics
