= Table tennis at the 2015 Pan American Games – Women's team =

Table tennis – Women's team at the 2015 Pan American Games
- Venue: Atos Markham Pan Am Centre
- Dates: July 19–21, 2015
- Competitors: 36 from 12 nations

Medalists
| Gold medal | Jennifer Wu; Lily Zhang; Jiaqi Zheng | United States |
| Silver medal | Gui Lin; Caroline Kumahara; Lígia Silva | Brazil |
| Bronze medal | Alicia Cote; Anqi Luo; Zhang Mo | Canada |
| Bronze medal | Carelyn Cordero; Adriana Diaz; Melanie Diaz | Puerto Rico |

The women's team table tennis event at the 2015 Pan American Games will be held between July 19 and 21, 2015 at the Atos Markham Pan Am Centre in Toronto, Canada. The winners of each the individual events will qualify to compete at the 2016 Summer Olympics in Rio de Janeiro, Brazil.

== Schedule ==
All times are Central Standard Time (UTC-6).

| Date | Time | Round |
|---|---|---|
| July 19, 2015 | 11:00 | Round Robin |
| July 20, 2015 | 10:00 | Round Robin |
| July 20, 2015 | 17:00 | Quarterfinals |
| July 21, 2015 | 10:00 | Semifinals |
| July 21, 2015 | 17:00 | Final |

== Results ==
=== Round Robin ===
The round robin will be used as a qualification round. The twelve teams will be split into groups of four. The top two teams from each group will advance to the first round of playoffs.

==== Group A ====
| Nation | Pld | W | L | GF | GA | Points |
|---|---|---|---|---|---|---|
| Brazil | 2 | 2 | 0 | 6 | 0 | 4 |
| Cuba | 2 | 1 | 1 | 3 | 3 | 3 |
| Peru | 2 | 0 | 2 | 0 | 6 | 2 |

==== Group B ====
| Nation | Pld | W | L | GF | GA | Points |
|---|---|---|---|---|---|---|
| United States | 2 | 2 | 0 | 6 | 0 | 4 |
| Argentina | 2 | 1 | 1 | 3 | 3 | 3 |
| Dominican Republic | 2 | 0 | 2 | 0 | 6 | 2 |

==== Group C ====
| Nation | Pld | W | L | GF | GA | Points |
|---|---|---|---|---|---|---|
| Canada | 2 | 2 | 0 | 6 | 3 | 4 |
| Colombia | 2 | 1 | 1 | 4 | 3 | 3 |
| Guatemala | 2 | 0 | 2 | 2 | 6 | 2 |

==== Group D ====
| Nation | Pld | W | L | GF | GA | Points |
|---|---|---|---|---|---|---|
| Puerto Rico | 2 | 2 | 0 | 6 | 4 | 4 |
| Chile | 2 | 1 | 1 | 5 | 5 | 3 |
| Mexico | 2 | 0 | 2 | 4 | 6 | 2 |

=== Playoffs ===
Quarterfinals
Brazil | 3 | 3 | 3
Colombia | 0 | 0 | 0
Argentina | 0 | 2 | 0
Puerto Rico | 3 | 3 | 3
Canada | 3 | 3 | 0 | 3
Chile | 2 | 0 | 3 | 0
Cuba | 0 | 0 | 1
United States | 3 | 3 | 3

Semifinals
Brazil | 2 | 3 | 3 | 3
Puerto Rico | 3 | 1 | 0 | 0
United States | 3 | 3 | 3
Canada | 0 | 0 | 0

Final
United States | 3 | 3 | 3
Brazil | 1 | 2 | 0

== Final classification ==
| Rank | Team | Athlete |
|---|---|---|
| 1st place, gold medalist(s) | United States | Jennifer Wu; Lily Zhang; Jiaqi Zheng |
| 2nd place, silver medalist(s) | Brazil | Gui Lin; Caroline Kumahara; Lígia Silva |
| 3rd place, bronze medalist(s) | Canada | Alicia Cote; Anqi Luo; Zhang Mo |
| 3rd place, bronze medalist(s) | Puerto Rico | Carelyn Cordero; Adriana Diaz; Melanie Diaz |
| 5 | Argentina | Camila Arguelles; Ana Codina; Agustina Iwasa |
| 5 | Chile | Natalia Castellano; Katherine Low; Paulina Vega |
| 5 | Colombia | Paula Medina; Lady Ruano; Angie Umbacia |
| 5 | Cuba | Lisi Castillo; Leisy Jimenez; Idalys Lovet |
| 9 | Dominican Republic | Eva Brito; Yasiris Ortiz; Johenny Valdez |
| 9 | Guatemala | Mabelyn Enriquez; Andrea Estrada; Andrea Montufar |
| 9 | Mexico | Mercedes Madrid; Monica Serrano; Yadira Silva |
| 9 | Peru | Angela Mori; Janina Nieto; Gabriela Soto |
