= Table tennis at the 2011 Pan American Games =

- Venue: CODE Dome
- Dates: October 15 - October 20
- Competitors: 80 from 17 nations

Table tennis competitions at the 2011 Pan American Games in Guadalajara were held from October 15 to October 20 at the CODE Dome.

A total of eighty players, forty each of male and female players, participated at the table tennis event. In the individual event, players competed in round robin groups to determine the teams advancing to the eighth-finals. In the doubles event, twelve teams of three played four singles and one doubles match against other teams in a round robin to determine the four teams advancing to the semifinals.

Singles matches were played as best-of-seven games; the players played each game until one player scores at least eleven points and wins by at least two points. Team matches will be different in that they will be best-of-five games instead of best of seven games.

The winners of each singles event will qualify to compete at the 2012 Summer Olympics in London, Great Britain.

== Medal summary ==
=== Medal table ===
* Host nation (Mexico)

Rank	Nation	Gold	Silver	Bronze	Total
1	Dominican Republic	1	1	1	3
2	Argentina	1	1	0	2
3	Brazil	1	0	0	1
3	Canada	1	0	0	1
5	Mexico*	0	1	1	2
6	Venezuela	0	1	0	1
7	United States	0	0	3	3
8	Colombia	0	0	1	1
8	Cuba	0	0	1	1
8	Ecuador	0	0	1	1
Totals (10 entries)		4	4	8	16

=== Events ===
Event	Gold	Silver	Bronze
Men's singles	Liu Song; Argentina	Marcos Madrid; Mexico	Alberto Mino; Ecuador
Men's singles	Liu Song; Argentina	Marcos Madrid; Mexico	Lin Ju; Dominican Republic
Women's singles	Zhang Mo; Canada	Wu Xue; Dominican Republic	Lily Zhang; United States
Women's singles	Zhang Mo; Canada	Wu Xue; Dominican Republic	Ariel Hsing; United States
Men's team	Brazil; Hugo Hoyama; Gustavo Tsuboi; Thiago Monteiro	Argentina; Pablo Tabachnik; Liu Song; Gastón Alto	Cuba; Andy Pereira; Jorge Campos; Pavel Oxamendi
Men's team	Brazil; Hugo Hoyama; Gustavo Tsuboi; Thiago Monteiro	Argentina; Pablo Tabachnik; Liu Song; Gastón Alto	Mexico; Marcos Madrid; Guillermo Munoz; Jude Okoh
Women's team	Dominican Republic; Wu Xue; Johenny Valdez; Eva Brito	Venezuela; Fabiola Ramos; Ruaida Ezzeddine; Luisana Perez	United States; Ariel Hsing; Lily Zhang; Erica Wu
Women's team	Dominican Republic; Wu Xue; Johenny Valdez; Eva Brito	Venezuela; Fabiola Ramos; Ruaida Ezzeddine; Luisana Perez	Colombia; Paula Medina; Luisa Zuluaga; Johana Araque

== Schedule ==
All times are Central Daylight time (UTC-5).

Day	Date	Start	Finish	Event	Phase
Day 2	Saturday, October 15	10:00	20:00	Men's/Women's teams	Preliminary round
Day 3	Sunday, October 16	10:00	20:00	Men's/Women's teams	Quarterfinals/Semifinals
Day 4	Monday, October 17	10:00	14:20	Men's/Women's teams	Finals
Day 5	Tuesday, October 18	10:00	20:00	Men's/Women individual	Preliminary round
Day 6	Wednesday, October 19	10:00	21:00	Men's/Women individual	Preliminary round/Rounds of 32 and 16
Day 7	Thursday, October 20	10:00	17:00	Men's/Women individual	Quarterfinals/Semifinals/Finals

== Qualification ==
Each NOC can enter a maximum of six athleted (3 male and 3 female). Mexico as host nations and twelve other nations through qualification tournaments can enter a full team for the respective gender. The other four spots per gender will be decided on an athlete basis, not country.

NOC	Men		Women		Total
NOC	Individual	Team	Individual	Team	Total
Argentina	3	X			3
Brazil	3	X	3	X	6
Canada	3	X	3	X	6
Chile	3	X	3	X	6
Colombia	1		3	X	4
Cuba	3	X	3	X	6
Dominican Republic	3	X	3	X	6
Ecuador	3	X			3
El Salvador	3	X	3	X	6
Guatemala	3	X	3	X	6
Mexico	3	X	3	X	6
Paraguay	1				1
Peru	1		3	X	4
Puerto Rico			3		3
Trinidad and Tobago	1		1		2
United States	3	X	3	X	6
Venezuela	3	X	3	X	6
Total: 17 NOCs	40	12	40	12	80
