= Table tennis at the 2016 Summer Olympics – Women's team =

Women's team table tennis at the Games of the XXXI Olympiad
- Venue: Riocentro – Pavilion 3
- Date: 12–16 August 2016
- Competitors: 48 from 16 nations
- Teams: 16

Medalists
| 1st place, gold medalist(s) | | Liu Shiwen; Ding Ning; Li Xiaoxia | China |
| 2nd place, silver medalist(s) | | Han Ying; Petrissa Solja; Shan Xiaona | Germany |
| 3rd place, bronze medalist(s) | | Kasumi Ishikawa; Ai Fukuhara; Mima Ito | Japan |

The women's team table tennis event was part of the table tennis programme at the 2016 Summer Olympics in Rio de Janeiro. The event took place from Friday 12 August to Tuesday 16 August 2016 at Riocentro.

The medals were presented by Timothy Fok, IOC member, Hong Kong and Thomas Weikert, President of the ITTF.

== Format ==
Teams were made up of three players. Each team match was made up of five individual matches and ended when either side had won three matches.

Order of a team match
| | | ABC team | | XYZ team |
|---|---|---|---|---|
| 1 | Singles | A | | X |
| 2 | Singles | B | | Y |
Choose doubles pair. 5 minutes break.
| 3 | Doubles | C + either A or B | vs | Z + either X or Y |
5 minutes break
| 4 | Singles | A or B (non-playing doubles) | | Z |
| 5 | Singles | C | | X or Y (non-playing doubles) |

== Schedule ==
All times are Brasília Time (UTC−3).

| Dates | Start time | Round |
|---|---|---|
| 12 August | 10:00 | First round |
| 13 August | 10:00 | Quarterfinals |
| 14 August | 19:30 | Semifinals |
| 15 August | 10:00 | Semifinals |
| 16 August | 11:00 | Bronze medal match |
| 16 August | 19:30 | Gold medal match |

== Seeds ==
Team ranking was based on the individual ITTF rating points of 31 July 2016 but was taken into consideration only the players qualified from each team.

| Rank | Team | Athletes (world ranking on 31 July) | | |
|---|---|---|---|---|
| 1 | China | Liu Shiwen (1) | Ding Ning (2) | Li Xiaoxia (5) |
| 2 | Japan | Kasumi Ishikawa (6) | Ai Fukuhara (8) | Mima Ito (9) |
| 3 | Germany | Han Ying (7) | Petrissa Solja (15) | Shan Xiaona (21) |
| 4 | Singapore | Feng Tianwei (4) | Yu Mengyu (13) | Zhou Yihan (32) |
| 5 | Hong Kong | Tie Ya Na (16) | Doo Hoi Kem (22) | Lee Ho Ching (24) |
| 6 | Netherlands | Li Jie (17) | Li Jiao (31) | Britt Eerland (95) |
| 7 | South Korea | Jeon Ji-hee (11) | Seo Hyo-won (17) | Yang Ha-eun (26) |
| 8 | North Korea | Ri Myong-sun (37) | Kim Song-i (50) | Ri Mi-gyong (69) |
| 9 | Chinese Taipei | Cheng I-ching (10) | Chen Szu-yu (41) | Huang Yi-hua (61) |
| 10 | Romania | Elizabeta Samara (29) | Daniela Dodean (58) | Bernadette Szőcs (78) |
| 11 | Austria | Liu Jia (25) | Sofia Polcanova (55) | Li Qiangbing (108) |
| 12 | Poland | Li Qian (30) | Katarzyna Grzybowska (60) | Natalia Partyka (74) |
| 13 | United States | Lily Zhang (101) | Zheng Jiaqi (111) | Jennifer Wu (146) |
| 14 | Brazil | Caroline Kumahara (120) | Lin Gui (139) | Bruna Takahashi (181) |
| 15 | Egypt | Dina Meshref (110) | Nadeen El-Dawlatly (211) | Yousra Abdel Razek (362) |
| 16 | Australia | Lay Jian Fang (128) | Melissa Tapper (341) | Ziyu Zhang (349) |

== Bracket ==
First round
1 | China | 3
14 | Brazil | 0
16 | Australia | 0
8 | North Korea | 3
7 | South Korea | 3
10 | Romania | 2
15 | Egypt | 0
4 | Singapore | 3
3 | Germany | 3
13 | United States | 0
9 | Chinese Taipei | 1
5 | Hong Kong | 3
6 | Netherlands | 1
11 | Austria | 3
12 | Poland | 0
2 | Japan | 3

Quarterfinals
1 | China | 3
8 | North Korea | 0
7 | South Korea | 2
4 | Singapore | 3
3 | Germany | 3
5 | Hong Kong | 1
11 | Austria | 0
2 | Japan | 3

Semifinals
1 | China | 3
4 | Singapore | 0
3 | Germany | 3
2 | Japan | 2

Gold medal match
1 | China | 3
3 | Germany | 0
Bronze medal match
4 | Singapore | 1
2 | Japan | 3

== Results ==
=== First round ===
| 12 August 2016; 10:00 | China | 3–0 | Brazil | Duration: 1h 6min |

| | Individual matches |
| Liu Shiwen | 3–0 | Lin Gui | 11–8, 11–5, 11–3 |
| Li Xiaoxia | 3–0 | Bruna Takahashi | 11–8, 11–7, 11–1 |
| Ding Ning / Liu Shiwen | 3–0 | Caroline Kumahara / Lin Gui | 11–1, 11–4, 11–4 |

| 12 August 2016; 10:00 | Australia | 0–3 | North Korea | Duration: 1h 12min |

| | Individual matches |
| Lay Jian Fang | 0–3 | Ri Mi-gyong | 8–11, 6–11, 9–11 |
| Ziyu Zhang | 0–3 | Ri Myong-sun | 4–11, 6–11, 3–11 |
| Melissa Tapper / Ziyu Zhang | 1–3 | Kim Song-i / Ri Myong-sun | 2–11, 12–10, 3–11, 8–11 |

| 12 August 2016; 10:00 | South Korea | 3–2 | Romania | Duration: 3h 9min |

| | Individual matches |
| Jeon Ji-hee | 3–0 | Elizabeta Samara | 11–6, 11–7, 11–7 |
| Seo Hyo-won | 0–3 | Daniela Dodean | 6–11, 9–11, 9–11 |
| Yang Ha-eun / Jeon Ji-hee | 3–1 | Bernadette Szőcs / Daniela Dodean | 12–10, 9–11, 13–11, 11–8 |
| Yang Ha-eun | 1–3 | Elizabeta Samara | 8–11, 11–7, 10–12, 9–11 |
| Seo Hyo-won | 3–2 | Bernadette Szőcs | 11–13, 14–12, 12–10, 9–11, 11–7 |

| 12 August 2016; 10:00 | Egypt | 0–3 | Singapore | Duration: 1h 10min |

| | Individual matches |
| Dina Meshref | 0–3 | Yu Mengyu | 3–11, 6–11, 6–11 |
| Nadeen El-Dawlatly | 1–3 | Feng Tianwei | 4–11, 11–9, 5–11, 4–11 |
| Yousra Abdel Razek / Nadeen El-Dawlatly | 0–3 | Zhou Yihan / Yu Mengyu | 7–11, 6–11, 4–11 |

| 12 August 2016; 15:00 | Germany | 3–0 | United States | Duration: 1h 56min |

| | Individual matches |
| Han Ying | 3–0 | Zheng Jiaqi | 11–9, 12–10, 11–6 |
| Shan Xiaona | 3–0 | Lily Zhang | 11–9, 11–4, 11–2 |
| Petrissa Solja / Shan Xiaona | 3–2 | Jennifer Wu / Zheng Jiaqi | 11–9, 12–14, 8–11, 12–10, 11–7 |

| 12 August 2016; 15:00 | Chinese Taipei | 1–3 | Hong Kong | Duration: 2h 29min |

| | Individual matches |
| Cheng I-ching | 3–1 | Lee Ho Ching | 10–12, 11–9, 11–3, 12–10 |
| Huang Yi-hua | 0–3 | Doo Hoi Kem | 9–11, 7–11, 7–11 |
| Chen Szu-yu / Huang Yi-hua | 0–3 | Tie Ya Na / Lee Ho Ching | 13–15, 9–11, 12–14 |
| Chen Szu-yu | 0–3 | Doo Hoi Kem | 8–11, 6–11, 8–11 |

| 12 August 2016; 15:00 | Netherlands | 1–3 | Austria | Duration: 3h 17min |

| | Individual matches |
| Li Jie | 3–2 | Sofia Polcanova | 11–9, 11–13, 11–5, 8–11, 11–5 |
| Li Jiao | 1–3 | Liu Jia | 12–10, 5–11, 6–11, 7–11 |
| Britt Eerland / Li Jiao | 1–3 | Li Qiangbing / Sofia Polcanova | 16–14, 9–11, 6–11, 9–11 |
| Britt Eerland | 2–3 | Liu Jia | 4–11, 6–11, 11–7, 17–15, 10–12 |

| 12 August 2016; 15:00 | Poland | 0–3 | Japan | Duration: 1h 38min |

| | Individual matches |
| Katarzyna Grzybowska | 0–3 | Kasumi Ishikawa | 5–11, 7–11, 6–11 |
| Li Qian | 1–3 | Mima Ito | 6–11, 6–11, 12–10, 2–11 |
| Natalia Partyka / Katarzyna Grzybowska | 1–3 | Ai Fukuhara / Mima Ito | 5–11, 11–9, 2–11, 9–11 |

=== Quarterfinals ===
| 13 August 2016; 10:00 | China | 3–0 | North Korea | Duration: 1h 16min |

| | Individual matches |
| Li Xiaoxia | 3–0 | Ri Mi-gyong | 11–8, 11–6, 11–8 |
| Liu Shiwen | 3–0 | Kim Song-i | 11–4, 11–5, 11–8 |
| Ding Ning / Liu Shiwen | 3–0 | Ri Myong-sun / Kim Song-i | 11–7, 11–3, 11–3 |

| 13 August 2016; 10:00 | South Korea | 2–3 | Singapore | Duration: 3h 11min |

| | Individual matches |
| Seo Hyo-won | 0–3 | Feng Tianwei | 2–11, 9–11, 10–12 |
| Jeon Ji-hee | 3–1 | Yu Mengyu | 11–8, 11–4, 9–11, 11–6 |
| Yang Ha-eun / Jeon Ji-hee | 3–2 | Zhou Yihan / Yu Mengyu | 11–7, 11–4, 4–11, 10–12, 11–7 |
| Seo Hyo-won | 0–3 | Zhou Yihan | 8–11, 9–11, 8–11 |
| Yang Ha-eun | 1–3 | Feng Tianwei | 3–11, 11–9, 14–16, 4–11 |

| 13 August 2016; 19:30 | Germany | 3–1 | Hong Kong | Duration: 2h 40min |

| | Individual matches |
| Han Ying | 3–0 | Lee Ho Ching | 11–6, 11–3, 11–4 |
| Petrissa Solja | 2–3 | Doo Hoi Kem | 11–9, 3–11, 11–9, 9–11, 12–14 |
| Shan Xiaona / Petrissa Solja | 3–0 | Tie Ya Na / Lee Ho Ching | 11–7, 11–3, 12–10 |
| Han Ying | 3–1 | Tie Ya Na | 11–5, 5–11, 11–7, 11–3 |

| 13 August 2016; 19:30 | Austria | 0–3 | Japan | Duration: 1h 34min |

| | Individual matches |
| Sofia Polcanova | 0–3 | Ai Fukuhara | 5–11, 9–11, 8–11 |
| Liu Jia | 1–3 | Kasumi Ishikawa | 11–5, 4–11, 7–11, 7–11 |
| Li Qiangbing / Sofia Polcanova | 1–3 | Mima Ito / Ai Fukuhara | 5–11, 12–10, 7–11, 10–12 |

=== Semifinals ===
| 14 August 2016; 19:30 | Germany | 3–2 | Japan | Duration: 3h 54min |

| | Individual matches |
| Petrissa Solja | 3–2 | Mima Ito | 5–11, 11–4, 8–11, 11–6, 12–10 |
| Han Ying | 2–3 | Kasumi Ishikawa | 11–6, 11–9, 6–11, 6–11, 8–11 |
| Shan Xiaona / Petrissa Solja | 3–2 | Ai Fukuhara / Mima Ito | 11–6, 10–12, 7–11, 11–9, 11–7 |
| Shan Xiaona | 0–3 | Kasumi Ishikawa | 2–11, 11–13, 12–14 |
| Han Ying | 3–2 | Ai Fukuhara | 7–11, 11–9, 11–4, 6–11, 11–9 |

| 15 August 2016; 10:00 | China | 3–0 | Singapore | Duration: 1h 32min |

| | Individual matches |
| Li Xiaoxia | 3–0 | Feng Tianwei | 12–10, 11–8, 11–9 |
| Ding Ning | 3–1 | Zhou Yihan | 11–7, 9–11, 11–6, 11–2 |
| Ding Ning / Liu Shiwen | 3–0 | Yu Mengyu / Zhou Yihan | 11–4, 11–1, 11–9 |

=== Bronze medal match ===
| 16 August 2016; 11:00 | Singapore | 1–3 | Japan | Duration: 2h 19min |

| | Individual matches |
| Yu Mengyu | 3–2 | Ai Fukuhara | 4–11, 11–5, 11–3, 4–11, 11–5 |
| Feng Tianwei | 0–3 | Kasumi Ishikawa | 10–12, 6–11, 7–11 |
| Yu Mengyu / Zhou Yihan | 1–3 | Ai Fukuhara / Mima Ito | 11–9, 9–11, 1–11, 12–14 |
| Feng Tianwei | 0–3 | Mima Ito | 9–11, 4–11, 6-11 |

=== Gold medal match ===
| 16 August 2016; 19:30 | China | 3–0 | Germany | Duration: 1h 25min |

| | Individual matches |
| Li Xiaoxia | 3–0 | Han Ying | 11–9, 11–3, 11–7 |
| Liu Shiwen | 3–0 | Petrissa Solja | 11–3, 11–5, 11–4 |
| Ding Ning / Liu Shiwen | 3–1 | Shan Xiaona / Petrissa Solja | 11–6, 11–5, 9–11, 11–7 |
