= Guatemala at the 2011 Pan American Games =

- IOC code: GUA
- NOC: Comité Olímpico Guatemalteco
- Website: www.cog.org.gt

in Guadalajara 14–30 October 2011
- Competitors: 139 in 28 sports
- Flag bearer: Kevin Cordón
- Medals Ranked 11th: Gold 7 Silver 3 Bronze 5 Total 15

Pan American Games appearances (overview)
- 1951; 1955; 1959; 1963; 1967; 1971; 1975; 1979; 1983; 1987; 1991; 1995; 1999; 2003; 2007; 2011; 2015; 2019; 2023

Other related appearances
- Independent Athletes Team (2023)

Guatemala competed at the 2011 Pan American Games in Guadalajara, Mexico from October 14 to 30, 2011. Guatemala sent 139 athletes in 28 sports.

== Medalists ==
Medal	Name	Sport	Event	Date
Gold	Sergio Sánchez	Shooting	Men's 50 metre pistol	October 18
Gold	Jean Brol	Shooting	Men's Trap	October 19
Gold	Kevin Cordón	Badminton	Men's singles	October 20
Gold	Erick Barrondo	Athletics	Men's 20 km walk	October 23
Gold	Jamy Franco	Athletics	Women's 20 km walk	October 23
Gold	María Castellanos	Karate	Women's +68 kg	October 27
Gold	Ana Sofía Gómez	Gymnastics	Women's balance beam	October 28
Silver	Andrei Gheorghe	Modern pentathlon	Men	October 16
Silver	Mirna Ortiz	Athletics	Women's 20 km walk	October 23
Silver	Ana Sofía Gómez	Gymnastics	Women's artistic individual all-around	October 26
Bronze	Stuardo Solórzano	Taekwondo	Men's 80 kg	October 17
Bronze	Jason Hess; José Daniel Hernández	Sailing	Hobie 16 open class	October 23
Bronze	Juan Ignacio Maegli	Sailing	Men's Laser class	October 23
Bronze	Cheili González	Karate	Women's 50 kg	October 28
Bronze	Jaime Quiyuch	Athletics	Men's 50 km walk	October 29

== Archery ==
Guatemala qualified 1 male archer.

Men

Athlete	Event	Ranking Round		Round of 32	Round of 16	Quarterfinals	Semifinals	Final	Rank
Athlete	Event	Score	Seed	Opposition Score	Opposition Score	Opposition Score	Opposition Score	Opposition Score	Rank
Julio Barillas	Men's individual	1231	24	E Malave (VEN); L 0–6	Did not advance				17

== Athletics ==
=== Track and road events ===
Event	Athletes	Heats		Semifinal		Final	
Event	Athletes	Time	Rank	Time	Rank	Time	Rank
800 m	Jenner Pelico			1:51.12	5th	Did not advance	
5000 m	Jose Raxon					14:59.78	13th
10000 m	Santos Pirir					32:30.64	10th
400 m hurdles	Allan Ayala			DNF		Did not advance	
20 km walk	Erick Barrondo					1:21:51	1st place, gold medalist(s)
20 km walk	Anibal Paau					1:24:06 PB	5th
50 km walk	Jaime Quiyuch					3:50:33 PB	3rd place, bronze medalist(s)
50 km walk	Anibal Paau					DNF	
Marathon	Alfredo Arevalo					2:25:53	11th
Marathon	José Amado García					2:20:27 SB	5th

=== Field events ===
Event	Athletes	Semifinal		Final	
Event	Athletes	Result	Rank	Result	Rank
Hammer throw	Diego Berrios	60.82 m.	9th		
Hammer throw	Edgar Florian	58.92 m.	11th		

=== Track and road events ===
Event	Athletes	Semifinal		Final	
Event	Athletes	Result	Rank	Result	Rank
3000 m steeplechase	Evonne Marroquin			11:50.31	10th
Marathon	Dina Cruz			3:22:15	15th
20 km walk	Jamy Franco			1:32:38 PR	1st place, gold medalist(s)
20 km walk	Mirna Ortiz			1:33:37 PB	2nd place, silver medalist(s)

=== Field events ===
Event	Athletes	Final	
Event	Athletes	Result	Rank
Triple jump	Ana Camargo	11.59 m.	15th
Triple jump	Estefany Cruz	12.86 m.	9th

== Badminton ==
Guatemala has qualified 4 men and 4 women.

Men

Athlete	Event	First round	Second round	Third round	Quarterfinals	Semifinals	Final	Rank
Athlete	Event	Opposition Result	Opposition Result	Opposition Result	Opposition Result	Opposition Result	Opposition Result	Rank
Kevin Cordón	Men's singles	BYE	T Ng (CAN); W 2–0 (21–11, 21–11)	M Cuba (PER); W 2–0 (21–15, 23–21)	P Yang (GUA); W 2–0 (21–11, 21–16)	D Paiola (BRA); W 2–0 (21–14, 21–8)	O Guerreo (CUB); W 2–0 (23–21, 21–19)	1st place, gold medalist(s)
Pedro Yang	Men's singles	BYE	G Henry (JAM); W 2–0 (21–19, 22–20)	S Pongnairat (USA); W 2–1 (21–14, 13–21, 21–16)	K Cordón (GUA); L 0–2 (11–21, 16–21)	Did not advance		
Rodolfo Ramírez	Men's singles	BYE	A Trigo (CHI); W 2–0 (21–8, 21–5)	O Guerrero (CUB); L 0–2 (20–22, 21–23)	Did not advance			
Rodolfo Ramírez; Pedro Yang	Men's doubles			J Castillo (MEX); A Ocegueda (MEX); L 1–2 (16–21, 21–16, 17–21)	Did not advance			

Women

Athlete	Event	First round	Second round	Third round	Quarterfinals	Semifinals	Final	Rank
Athlete	Event	Opposition Result	Opposition Result	Opposition Result	Opposition Result	Opposition Result	Opposition Result	Rank
Ana Lucia de León	Women's singles	BYE	C Orosameli (DOM); W 2–0 (21–12, 21–8)	M Li (CAN); L 0–2 (14–21, 6–21)	Did not advance			
Pamela Saravia	Women's singles	BYE	I Wang (USA); L 0–2 (11–21, 13–21)	Did not advance				
Nicte Sotomayor	Women's singles	BYE	G Araujo (VEN); W 2–0 (21–6, 21–12)	C Rivero (PER); L 0–2 (6–21, 1–21)	Did not advance			
Pamela Saravia; Nikté Sotomayor	Women's doubles		BYE	I Wang (USA); R Wang (USA); L 0–2 (7–21, 6–21)	Did not advance			
Ana Lucia de León; Maria del Valle	Women's doubles		BYE	C Aicardi (PER); C Rivero (PER); L 0–2 (10–21, 7–21)	Did not advance			

Mixed

Athlete	Event	First round	Second round	Quarterfinals	Semifinals	Final	Rank
Athlete	Event	Opposition Result	Opposition Result	Opposition Result	Opposition Result	Opposition Result	Rank
Heymard Humblers; Nikté Sotomayor	Mixed doubles	D Darmohoetomo (SUR); R Ishaak (SUR); W 2–0 (22–20, 21–12)	C Pyne (JAM); K Wynter (JAM); W 2–0 (21–19, 21–11)	R Pacheco (PER); C Rivero (PER); L 0–2 (10–21, 13–21)	Did not advance		

== Beach volleyball ==
Athlete	Event	Preliminary round			Quarterfinals	Semifinals	Finals	
Athlete	Event	Opposition Score	Opposition Score	Opposition Score	Opposition Score	Opposition Score	Opposition Score	Rank
Erick Garrido; Andy Leonardo	Men	Santiago Etchegaray (ARG); Pablo Miguel Suárez (ARG); L 19-21, 11-21	Dellan Brown (JAM); Namarie Gordon (JAM); W 21-9, 21-15	Roberto Rodríguez (PUR); Christopher Underwood (PUR); W 2113, 23-21	Igor Hernández (VEN); Farid Mussa (VEN); L 15-21, 15-21	Did not advance		
Maria Jose Orellana; Anna Loirdes Ramirez	Women	Andrea Galindo (COL); Claudia Galindo (COL); L 19-21, 21-18, 10-15	Eily Day (USA); Heather Hughes (USA); L 26-28, 22-20, 8-15	Camila Pazdirek (CHI); Francisca Rivas (CHI); W 21-17, 21-8	Did not advance			

== Basque pelota ==
Guatemala qualified a paleta leather pairs 30m fronton (2 athletes) in the sports debut at the Pan American Games.

Athlete(s)	Event	Series 1	Series 2	Series 3	Series 4	Finals	Rank
Athlete(s)	Event	Opposition Score	Opposition Score	Opposition Score	Opposition Score	Opposition Score	Rank
Enrique Blas; Juan Diego Blas	Paleta Rubber Pairs 30m Fronton	F Ergueta (ARG); J Nicosia (ARG); L 1-12, 1-12	Fernandez (CRC); Jorge López (CRC); W 12 – 3, 12 – 4	O Bustillo (NCA); V Bustillo (NCA) 'W'12 – 6, 12 – 2	F Celaya (CHI); P De Orte (CHI); L 5-12, 4-12	Did not advance	

== Bowling ==
Guatemala qualified a full team of 2 men and 2 women.

=== Men ===
Individual

Athlete	Event	Qualification															Eighth Finals	Quarterfinals	Semifinals	Finals	
Athlete	Event	Block 1 (Games 1–6)						Block 2 (Games 7–12)						Total	Average	Rank	Eighth Finals	Quarterfinals	Semifinals	Finals	
Athlete	Event	1	2	3	4	5	6	7	8	9	10	11	12	Total	Average	Rank	Opposition Scores	Opposition Scores	Opposition Scores	Opposition Scores	Rank
Miguel Aguilar	Men's individual	224	204	187	203	205	223	172	202	188	176	187	194	2365	197.1	19th	Did not advance				
Mauricio Piñol	Men's individual	139	170	179	226	233	217	172	223	222	202	180	170	2333	194.4	23rd	Did not advance				

Pairs

Athlete	Event	Block 1 (Games 1–6)								Block 2 (Games 7–12)								Grand total	Final Rank
Athlete	Event	1	2	3	4	5	6	Total	Average	7	8	9	10	11	12	Total	Average	Grand total	Final Rank
Miguel Aguilar; Victor Tateishi	Men's pairs	165	236	176	173	175	161	1086	180.7	197	234	258	189	177	163	2204	183.7	4358	14th
Miguel Aguilar; Victor Tateishi	Men's pairs	166	216	203	196	168	158	1107	184.5	193	222	212	182	200	191	2307	192.3	4358	14th

=== Women ===
Individual

Athlete	Event	Qualification															Eighth Finals	Quarterfinals	Semifinals	Finals	
Athlete	Event	Block 1 (Games 1–6)						Block 2 (Games 7–12)						Total	Average	Rank	Eighth Finals	Quarterfinals	Semifinals	Finals	
Athlete	Event	1	2	3	4	5	6	7	8	9	10	11	12	Total	Average	Rank	Opposition Scores	Opposition Scores	Opposition Scores	Opposition Scores	Rank
Sofia Rodriguez	Women's individual	168	259	188	211	175	184	198	203	214	218	268	214	2500	208.3	4th Q	Patricia de Faria (VEN); L 586 – 620	Did not advance			
Ximena Soto	Women's individual	223	149	166	154	211	175	170	157	198	181	241	159	2184	182.0	21st	Did not advance				

Pairs

Athlete	Event	Block 1 (Games 1–6)								Block 2 (Games 7–12)								Grand total	Final Rank
Athlete	Event	1	2	3	4	5	6	Total	Average	7	8	9	10	11	12	Total	Average	Grand total	Final Rank
Sofia Rodriguez; Ximena Soto	Women's pairs	211	201	193	183	204	214	1206	201.0	204	222	208	188	180	185	2393	199.4	4577	7th
Sofia Rodriguez; Ximena Soto	Women's pairs	192	202	173	196	194	191	1148	191.3	179	197	164	191	146	159	2184	182.0	4577	7th

== Boxing ==
Athlete	Event	Preliminaries	Quarterfinals	Semifinals	Final
Athlete	Event	Opposition Result	Opposition Result	Opposition Result	Opposition Result
Eddie Valenzuela	Flyweight	Marvin Solano (NCA); W 22-10	Dagoberto Aguero (DOM); L 13-20	Did not advance	
Jose Virula	Light welterweight		Roniel Iglesias (CUB); L 10-19	Did not advance	

== Canoeing ==
Men

Athlete(s)	Event	Heats		Semifinals		Final	
Athlete(s)	Event	Time	Rank	Time	Rank	Time	Rank
Richard Giron	K-1 200 m	40.086	6th QS	38.858	4th	Did not advance	
Richard Giron; Kevin Rivas	K-2 200 m	39.842	5th QS	38.318	5th	Did not advance	
Richard Giron; Kevin Rivas	K-2 1000 m					3:48.713	8th

Women

Athlete(s)	Event	Heats		Semifinals		Final	
Athlete(s)	Event	Time	Rank	Time	Rank	Time	Rank
Claudia Giovana Perez	K-1 200 m	51.577	6th QS	51.859	6th	Did not advance	
Daisy Mendoza	K-1 500 m	2:18.916	5th QS	DNF		Did not advance	

== Cycling ==
=== Road Cycling ===
==== Men ====
Athlete	Event	Time	Rank
Carlos Gabriel Hernández	Road race	3:45:04	17th
Manuel Rodas	Road race	3:45:04	18th

=== Track cycling ===
==== Omnium ====
Athlete	Event	Flying Lap Time Rank	Points Race Points Rank	Elimination Race Rank	Ind Pursuit Time	Scratch Race Rank	Time Trial Time	Final Rank
Manuel Rodas	Men	14.805; 11th	77; 1st	11th	4:38.447; 7th	0; 1st	1:10.107; 10th	41; 7th

== Equestrian ==
Guatemala qualified an equestrian team.

=== Dressage ===
Athlete	Horse	Event	Grand Prix		Grand Prix Special		Grand Prix Freestyle		Final Score	Rank
Athlete	Horse	Event	Score	Rank	Score	Rank	Score	Rank	Final Score	Rank
Christa Dauber	Serafino	Individual	65.895	22nd	Did not advance					
Esther Mortimer	Viva's Veroveraar	Individual	64.079	28th	66.079	19th	Did not advance			
Silvia Roesch	Caracol XXIV	Individual	62.447	33rd	Did not advance					
Vivian Schorpp	Messina	Individual	58.395	47th	Did not advance					
Christa Dauber; Esther Mortimer; Silvia Roesch; Vivian Schorpp	Serafino; Viva's Veroveraar; Caracol XXIV; Messina	Team	64.140	8th					64.140	8th

=== Eventing ===
Athlete	Horse	Event	Dressage		Cross-country		Jumping				Total	
Athlete	Horse	Event	Dressage		Cross-country		Qualifier		Final		Total	
Athlete	Horse	Event	Penalties	Rank	Penalties	Rank	Penalties	Rank	Penalties	Rank	Penalties	Rank
Juan Pablo Pivaral	VDL Tommy	Individual	58.00	20th	EL		Did not advance					
Rita Sanz-Agero	Remonta Imperdible	Individual	58.20	22nd	56.00	27th	4.00	25th	Did not advance			
Taziana Billy	Shandon	Individual	63.30	33rd	EL		Did not advance					
Rigoberto Aldana	Durango	Individual	67.40	41st	3.60	16th	0.00	12th	0.00	8th	71.00	8th
Carlos Sueiras	Ines	Individual	77.80	49th	65.60	27th	0.00	27th	Did not advance			
Juan Pablo Pivaral; Rita Sanz-Agero; Taziana Billy; Rigoberto Aldana; Carlos Sueiras	VDL Tommy; Remonta Imperdible; Shandon; Durango; Ines	Team	179.50	8th	189.10	5th	4.00	5th			372.60	5th

=== Individual jumping ===
Athlete	Horse	Event	Ind. 1st Qualifier		Ind. 2nd Qualifier			Ind. 3rd Qualifier			Ind. Final					
Athlete	Horse	Event	Ind. 1st Qualifier		Ind. 2nd Qualifier			Ind. 3rd Qualifier			Round A		Round B		Total	
Athlete	Horse	Event	Penalties	Rank	Penalties	Total	Rank	Penalties	Total	Rank	Penalties	Rank	Penalties	Rank	Penalties	Rank
Alvaro Tejada	Voltaral Palo Blanco	Individual	12.49	46th	12.00	24.49	37th	4.00	28.49	18th	Did not advance					
Eduardo Castillo	Carland	Individual	7.37	36th	17.00	24.37	45th	6.00	30.37	32nd	Did not advance					
Juan Rodríguez	VDL Empire	Individual	18.80	53rd	13.00	31.80	38th	4.00	35.80	18th	Did not advance					
Juan Pivaral	Valencia	Individual	8.53	39th	13.00	21.53	38th	4.00	25.53	18th	Did not advance					

=== Team jumping ===
Athlete	Horse	Event	Qualification Round		Final					
Athlete	Horse	Event	Qualification Round		Round 1		Round 2		Total	
Athlete	Horse	Event	Penalties	Rank	Penalties	Rank	Penalties	Rank	Penalties	Rank
Alvaro Tejada; Eduardo Castillo; Juan Rodríguez; Juan Pivaral	Voltaral Palo Blanco; Carland; VDL Empire; Valencia	Team	28.39	10th	38	11th	12	8th	78.39	9th

== Fencing ==
Guatemala qualified one male épée fencer.

=== Men ===
Event	Athlete	Round of Poules		Round of 16	Quarterfinals	Semifinals	Final
Event	Athlete	Result	Seed	Opposition Score	Opposition Score	Opposition Score	Opposition Score
Individual épée	Gerber Morales	0 V – 5 D	18th	Did not advance			

== Gymnastics ==
=== Artistic ===
Guatemala qualified a team of 1 man and 1 woman.

Men
Individual qualification & Team Finals

Athlete	Event	Apparatus						Qualification		Final	
Athlete	Event	Floor	Pommel horse	Rings	Vault	Parallel bars	Horizontal bar	Total	Rank	Total	Rank
Mynor Juarez	Ind Qualification	13.050	11.750	12.000	14.900	13.300	12.800	77.800	24th		

Individual Finals

Athlete	Event	Final							
Athlete	Event	Floor	Pommel horse	Rings	Vault	Parallel bars	Horizontal bar	Total	Rank
Mynor Juarez	Individual All-around	12.400	12.250	12.100	15.000	12.350	10.300	74.400	17th

Women
Individual qualification & Team Finals

Athlete	Event	Apparatus				Qualification		Final	
Athlete	Event	Vault	Uneven bars	Balance Beam	Floor	Total	Rank	Total	Rank
Ana Sofía Gómez	Ind Qualification	14.550	12.825	14.675	13.375	55.425	1st		

Individual Finals

Athlete	Event	Apparatus				Final	
Athlete	Event	Vault	Uneven bars	Balance Beam	Floor	Total	Rank
Ana Sofía Gómez	Individual All-around	14.525	12.900	14.350	13.650	55.425	2nd place, silver medalist(s)
Ana Sofía Gómez	Individual Balance Beam			14.175		14.175	1st place, gold medalist(s)
Ana Sofía Gómez	Individual Floor				11.300	11.300	8th

=== Rhythmic ===
Guatemala has 1 gymnast.

All Around

Athlete	Event	Final					
Athlete	Event	Hoop	Rope	Clubs	Ribbon	Total	Rank
Linda Sandoval	Individual	21.800	19.175	21.250	20.400	82.625	13th

== Judo ==
Men

Athlete	Event	Round of 16	Quarterfinals	Semifinals	Final
Athlete	Event	Opposition Result	Opposition Result	Opposition Result	Opposition Result
Darrell Castillo	+100 kg	Luis Ignasio Salazar (COL); L 000 S1 – 100	Did not advance (to repechage round)		

Repechage Rounds

Athlete	Event	Repechage 8	Repechage Final	Bronze Final
Athlete	Event	Opposition Result	Opposition Result	Opposition Result
Darrell Castillo	+100 kg	Carlos Zegarra (PER); L 000 S1 – 100	Did not advance	

Women

Athlete	Event	Round of 16	Quarterfinals	Semifinals	Final
Athlete	Event	Opposition Result	Opposition Result	Opposition Result	Opposition Result
Yennifer Dominguez	−63 kg	Diana Velasco (COL); L 000 S2 – 102	Did not advance (to repechage round)		
Andrea Menegazzo	−70 kg	Kelita Zupancic (CAN); L 000 S1 – 100	Did not advance (to repechage round)		
Mirla Nolberto	−78 kg	Keivi Pinto (VEN); W 122 S2 – 001	Lorena Briceño (ARG); L 001 S2 – 002 S2	Did not advance (to repechage round)	

Repechage Rounds

Athlete	Event	Repechage 8	Repechage Final	Bronze Final
Athlete	Event	Opposition Result	Opposition Result	Opposition Result
Yennifer Dominguez	−63 kg	Ysis Barreto (VEN); W 010 S2 – 002 S3	Stéfany Tremblay (CAN); L 000 – 100	Did not advance
Andrea Menegazzo	−70 kg	Lizbeth Leon (MEX); L Hantei	Did not advance	
Mirla Nolberto	−78 kg		Anny Cortes (COL); L 000 S3 – 120	Did not advance

== Karate ==
Guatemala qualified 3 female karate athletes.

Athlete	Event	Round robin (Pool A/B)			Semifinals	Final
Athlete	Event	Match 1	Match 2	Match 3	Semifinals	Final
Athlete	Event	Opposition Result	Opposition Result	Opposition Result	Opposition Result	Opposition Result
Cheili Gonzalez	Women's -50 kg	Laura Contreras (MEX); W PTS 1:0	Dougmay Camacaro (VEN); W PTS 2:0	Ana Villanueva (DOM); L PTS 0:2	Gabriela Bruna (CHI); L PTS 0:1 (bronze)	Did not advance
Ester Micheo	Women's -55 kg	Lorena Mendoza (MEX); L PTS 0:2	Shannon Nishi (USA); L PTS 2:3	Jessy Reyes (CHI); L PTS 1:4	Did not advance	
Maria Castellanos	Women's -68 kg	Xunashi Caballero (MEX); HWK 0:0	Rosa Zavala (PUR); W PTS 3:0	Perla Zalazar (ARG); W PTS 6:0	Claudia Vera (CHI); W PTS 2:2	Xunashi Caballero (MEX); W PTS 2:1 (gold)

== Modern pentathlon ==
Guatemala qualified a full team of 4 athletes (2 men and 2 women).

Athlete	Event	Fencing (Épée One Touch)			Swimming (200m Freestyle)			Riding (Show Jumping)			Combined			Total Points	Final Rank
Athlete	Event	Results	Rank	MP Points	Time	Rank	MP Points	Penalties	Rank	MP Points	Time	Rank	MP Points	Total Points	Final Rank
Andrei Dan Gheorghe	Men's	18 V – 6 D	2nd	1036	2:16.13	16th	1168	89.66	1164	13th	11:13.63	5th	2304	5672	2nd place, silver medalist(s)
Nikkos Papadopolo	Men's	17 V – 7 D	4th	1000	2:09.24	5th	1252	75.48	7th	1200	12:13.68	14th	2064	5516	7th

Women

Athlete	Event	Fencing (Épée One Touch)			Swimming (200m Freestyle)			Riding (Show Jumping)			Combined			Total Points	Final Rank
Athlete	Event	Results	Rank	MP Points	Time	Rank	MP Points	Penalties	Rank	MP Points	Time	Rank	MP Points	Total Points	Final Rank
Stephany Marines Garza	Women's	21 V – 11D	3rd	972	2:26.76	9th	1040	82.79	9th	1160	13:53.80	10th	1668	4840	6th
Geraldina Abigail Garzo	Women's	13 V – 19 D	13th	748	2:34.85	14th	944	89.48	3rd	1184	15:12.22	14th	1352	4228	13th

== Racquetball ==
=== Women ===
Athlete	Event	Preliminary round (2 or 3)	Round of 32	Round of 16	Quarterfinals	Semifinals	Final
Athlete	Event	Opposition Score	Opposition Score	Opposition Score	Opposition Score	Opposition Score	Opposition Score
Marie Gomar	Singles	Cheryl Gudinas (USA); L 3 – 15, 1 – 15; María Vargas (BOL); W 15 – 3, 15 – 8 Claudine Garcia (DOM); L 8 – 15, 1 – 15	Islhey Paredes (VEN); L 15 – 14, 7 – 15, 5 – 11	Did not advance			

== Roller skating ==
Colombia has qualified a men's and women's team in the roller skating competition.

Men

Athlete	Event	Qualification		Final	
Athlete	Event	Result	Rank	Result	Rank
Jesus Guerrero	300 m time trial			26.827	10th
Jesus Guerrero	1,000 m	1:28.900	5th Q	1:29.086	8th
Marcos Tzul	10,000 m			DNF	

Women

Athlete	Event	Qualification		Final	
Athlete	Event	Result	Rank	Result	Rank
Dalia Soberanis	300 m time trial			30.389	9th
Dalia Soberanis	1,000 m	1:42.263	5th	Did not advance	
Joan Estrada	10,000 m			DNF	

== Rowing ==
=== Men ===
Athlete(s)	Event	Heats		Repechage		Final	
Athlete(s)	Event	Time	Rank	Time	Rank	Time	Rank
Leif Catalan; Herman Garcia; Juan Guevara; Oscar Maeda	Lightweight coxless four (LM4-)	6:29.06	4th R	6:30.04	4th QB	6:21.59	2nd B

=== Women ===
Athlete(s)	Event	Heats		Repechage		Final	
Athlete(s)	Event	Time	Rank	Time	Rank	Time	Rank
Maria Samayoa; Jennieffer Zuñiga	Lightweight double sculls (LW2×)	7:55.98	6th Q			7:59.52	6th

== Sailing ==
Guatemala qualified a 4 boats and 5 athletes.

=== Men ===
Athlete	Event	Race											Net Points	Final Rank
Athlete	Event	1	2	3	4	5	6	7	8	9	10	M	Net Points	Final Rank
Juan Ignacio Maegli	Single-handed Dinghy (Laser)	(14); OCS	6	6	9	3	2	1	4	6	1	4	42.0	3rd place, bronze medalist(s)

=== Women ===
Athlete	Event	Race											Net Points	Final Rank
Athlete	Event	1	2	3	4	5	6	7	8	9	10	M	Net Points	Final Rank
Andrea Dennise Aldana	Single-handed Dinghy (Laser Radial)	(12)	6	9	12	5	12	5	8	11	11	/	79.0	10th

=== Open ===
Athlete	Event	Race											Net Points	Final Rank
Athlete	Event	1	2	3	4	5	6	7	8	9	10	M	Net Points	Final Rank
Jose Daniel Hernandez; Jason Alexander Hess	Multihull (Hobie 16)	5	4	2	5	1	5	3	(9); OCS	2	5	2	34.0	3rd place, bronze medalist(s)
David Misael Hernandez	Single-handed Dinghy (Sunfish)	11	(12)	7	9	12	8	3	10	7	8	/	75.0	11th

== Shooting ==
Men

Event	Athlete	Qualification		Final	
Event	Athlete	Score	Rank	Score	Rank
10 m air pistol	Sergio Werner Sanchez	569-15x	11th	Did not advance	
10 m air rifle	Elvin Lopez	582-38x	11th	Did not advance	
10 m air rifle	Octavio Sandoval	585-33x	8th Q	686.9	6th
25 m rapid fire pistol	Sergio Werner Sanchez	557-13x	7th	Did not advance	
50 m rifle prone	Marlon Perez	580-23x	14th	Did not advance	
50 m rifle prone	Octavio Sandoval	DNS		Did not advance	
50 m rifle three positions	Marlon Perez	1122-39x	17th	Did not advance	
50 m rifle three positions	Elvin Lopez	1127-33x	14th	Did not advance	
50 m pistol	Sergio Werner Sanchez	559-9x	1st Q	648.9	1st place, gold medalist(s)
Trap	Sergio Werner Sanchez	124 =PR	1st Q	146 FPR	1st place, gold medalist(s)
Trap	Alvaro Enrique Rodriguez	108	22nd	Did not advance	
Double Trap	Fernando Brol	132	6th Q	180	4th
Double Trap	Hebert Brol	133	4th Q	179	5th
Skeet	Juan Carlos Romero	114	17th	Did not advance	
Skeet	Rodrigo Zachrisson	118 +5	8th	Did not advance	

Women

Event	Athlete	Qualification		Final	
Event	Athlete	Score	Rank	Score	Rank
10 m air pistol	Delmi Cruz	368- 8x	13th	Did not advance	
10 m air pistol	Lucia Menendez	368- 9x	12th	Did not advance	
10 m air rifle	Edna Monzon	380-19x	26th	Did not advance	
10 m air rifle	Diana Maria Velasco	384-21x	16th	Did not advance	
25 m pistol	Delmi Cruz	559-11x	14th	Did not advance	
25 m pistol	Lucia Menendez	555-10x	16th	Did not advance	
50 m rifle three positions	Edna Monzon	561-18x	14th	Did not advance	
50 m rifle three positions	Diana Maria Velasco	560-18x	15th	Did not advance	
Double Skeet	Andrea Romero	59	5th Q	80	5th

== Squash ==
Guatemala qualified a full squash team. The team will be made up of 6 athletes (3 men and 3 women).

=== Men ===
Athlete	Event	Round of 32	Round of 16	Quarterfinals	Semifinals	Final
Athlete	Event	Opposition Score	Opposition Score	Opposition Score	Opposition Score	Opposition Score
José Méndez	Singles	Christopher Binnie (JAM); L 5-11, 4-11, 11-13	Did not advance			
Mauricio Sedano	Singles	jaime Pinto (CHI); L 7-11, 7-11, 8-11	Did not advance			
José Méndez; Bryan Bonilla	Doubles			Arturo Salazar (MEX); Eric Gálvez (MEX); L 4-11, 3-11	Did not advance	

Athletes	Event	Preliminaries Group stage			Quarterfinal	Semifinal	Final	Rank
Athletes	Event	Opposition Result	Opposition Result	Opposition Result	Opposition Result	Opposition Result	Opposition Result	Rank
José Méndez; Bryan Bonilla; Mauricio Sedano	Team	Colombia; L 0-3, 0-3, 0-3	Canada; L 0-3, 0-3, 2-3	Chile; L 3-1, 0-3, 0-3	Did not advance			

=== Women ===
Athlete	Event	First round	Round of 16	Quarterfinals	Semifinals	Final
Athlete	Event	Opposition Score	Opposition Score	Opposition Score	Opposition Score	Opposition Score
Pamela Anckerman	Singles		Catalina Peláez (COL); L 7-11, 3-11, 4-11	Did not advance		
Winifer Bonilla	Singles	Antonella Falcione (ARG); L 6-11, 3-11, 1-11	Did not advance			
Pamela Anckerman; Winifer Bonilla	Doubles			Maria Ubina (USA); Olivia Blatchford (USA); L 11-10, 7-11, 7-11	Did not advance	

Athletes	Event	Preliminaries Group stage			Quarterfinal	Semifinal	Final	Rank
Athletes	Event	Opposition Result	Opposition Result	Opposition Result	Opposition Result	Opposition Result	Opposition Result	Rank
Pamela Anckerman; Winifer Bonilla; Nicolle Anckerman	Team	Colombia; L 0-3, 0-3, 0-3	Canada; L 0-3, 1-3, 0-3	Chile; W 3-2, 0-3, 3-0	Did not advance			

== Swimming ==
Men

Event	Athletes	Heats		Final	
Event	Athletes	Time	Position	Time	Position
200 m Freestyle	Kevin Avila	2:00.47	20th	Did not advance	
10 km marathon	Kevin Vazquez			2:16:34.4	15th

Women

Event	Athletes	Heats		Final	
Event	Athletes	Time	Position	Time	Position
100 m Backstroke	Gisela Morales	1:02.95	5th Q	1:03.37	7th
200 m Backstroke	Gisela Morales	2:17.86	6th Q	2:16.33	4th
10 km marathon	Maria Muñoz			2:27:31.4	14th
10 km marathon	Cindy Toscano			2:27:31.4	14th

== Table tennis ==
Men

Athlete	Event	Round robin			1st round	Eighthfinals	Quarterfinals	Semifinals	Final
Athlete	Event	Match 1	Match 2	Match 3	1st round	Eighthfinals	Quarterfinals	Semifinals	Final
Athlete	Event	Opposition Result	Opposition Result	Opposition Result	Opposition Result	Opposition Result	Opposition Result	Opposition Result	Opposition Result
Hector Gatica	Singles	Marco Navas (VEN); W 4 – 3	Alejandro Rodríguez (CHI); L 2 – 4	Liu Song (ARG); L 0 – 4	Did not advance				
Heber Moscoso	Singles	Josue Donado (ESA); L 2 – 4	Pierre-Luc Hinse (CAN); L 1 – 4	Hugo Hoyama (BRA); L 0 – 4	Did not advance				
Jose Miguel Ramirez	Singles	Gaston Alto (ARG); W 4 – 2	Pierre-Luc Thériault (CAN); L 3 – 4	Andres Carlier (CHI); W 4 – 0		Marcos Madrid (MEX); L 3 – 4	Did not advance		
Hector Gatica; Heber Moscoso; Jose Miguel Ramirez	Team	Canada; L 1 – 3, 1 – 3, 1 – 3	Dominican Republic; L 2 – 3, 1 – 3, 3 – 2, 1 – 3				Did not advance		

Women

Athlete	Event	Round robin			1st round	Eighthfinals	Quarterfinals	Semifinals	Final
Athlete	Event	Match 1	Match 2	Match 3	1st round	Eighthfinals	Quarterfinals	Semifinals	Final
Athlete	Event	Opposition Result	Opposition Result	Opposition Result	Opposition Result	Opposition Result	Opposition Result	Opposition Result	Opposition Result
Mabelyn Enriquez	Singles	Anqi Luo (CAN); L 2 – 4	Luisa Zuluaga (COL); L 2 – 4	Lígia Silva (BRA); L 0 – 4	Did not advance				
Andrea Estrada	Singles	Paulina Vega (CHI); L 0 – 4	Jerica Marrero (PUR); W 4 – 1	Luisana Perez (VEN); W 4 – 3	Anqi Luo (CAN); L 3 – 4	Did not advance			
Analdy Lopez	Singles	Ruaida Ezzedinne (VEN); L 0 – 4	Rheann Chung (TRI); L 3 – 4	Ariel Hsing (USA); L 0 – 4	Did not advance				
Mabelyn Enriquez; Andrea Estrada; Analdy Lopez	Team	Canada; L 0 – 3, 2 – 3, 1 – 3	Chile; L 0 – 3, 2 – 3, 1 – 3				Did not advance		

== Taekwondo ==
Guatemala qualified a team of 6 Taekwondo athletes.

Men

Athlete	Event	Round of 16	Quarterfinals	Semifinals	Final
Athlete	Event	Opposition Result	Opposition Result	Opposition Result	Opposition Result
Jhonnatan Mejia	Flyweight (-58kg)	Olie Burton III (USA); W 15 – 11	Damián Villa (MEX); L 8 – 12	Did not advance	
Federico Rosal	Lightweight (-68kg)	Luis Colon (PUR); W 14 – 2	Jhohanny Jean (DOM); L 3 – 9	Did not advance	
Stuardo Solorzano	Middleweight (-80kg)	Mario Tellez (CUB); W 9 – 8	Stuart Smit (ARU); W SDP 4 – 4	Sebastian Crismanich (ARG); L 1 – 8 (bronze)	Did not advance
Adrian Sagastume	Heavyweight (+80kg)	Robelis Despaigne (CUB); L 1 – 7	Did not advance		

Women

Athlete	Event	Round of 16	Quarterfinals	Semifinals	Final
Athlete	Event	Opposition Result	Opposition Result	Opposition Result	Opposition Result
Elizabeth Zamora	Flyweight (-49kg)	Deireanne Morales (USA); L 5 – 6	Did not advance		
Euda Carias	Flyweight (-49kg)	Yeny Contreras (CHI); L 1 – 5	Did not advance		

== Tennis ==
Men

Athlete	Event	1st Round	Round of 32	Round of 16	Quarterfinals	Semifinals	Final
Athlete	Event	Opposition Score	Opposition Score	Opposition Score	Opposition Score	Opposition Score	Opposition Score
Sebastien Vidal	Singles		Jorge Aguilar (CHI); L 1 – 6, 4 – 6	Did not advance			
Christopher Díaz Figueroa	Singles		Daniel Alejandro Lopez (PAR); W 7 – 6(4), 7 – 6(5)	Julio César Campozano (ECU); L 6(5) – 7, 6 – 4, 5 – 7	Did not advance		
Christopher Díaz Figueroa; Sebastien Vidal	Doubles			Martín Cuevas (URU); Federico Sansonetti (URU); L 3 – 6, 6 – 4, [6-10]			

== Triathlon ==
=== Men ===
Athlete	Event	Swim (1.5 km)	Trans 1	Bike (40 km)	Trans 2	Run (10 km)	Total	Rank
Gerardo Vergara	Individual	18:15; 5th	0:25; 16th	57:23; 21st	0:17; 23rd	37:40; 20th	1:54:01	20th
Fabian Flores	Individual	19:00; 22nd	0:27; 32nd	1:04:17; 29th	0:21; 31st	39:51; 28th	2:03:58	29th

=== Women ===
Athlete	Event	Swim (1.5 km)	Trans 1	Bike (40 km)	Trans 2	Run (10 km)	Total	Rank
Daniela Schoenfeld	Individual	DSQ						
Marleny Schoenfeld	Individual	DSQ						

== Weightlifting ==
Athlete	Event	Snatch			Clean & jerk			Total	Rank
Athlete	Event	Attempt 1	Attempt 2	Attempt 3	Attempt 1	Attempt 2	Attempt 3	Total	Rank
Alex Francisco Hernandez	Men's 62 kg	~~108~~	~~108~~	108	130	~~136~~	136	244	7th
Welinton Pec	Men's 62 kg	~~105~~	105	~~108~~	145	~~150~~	150	255	5th
Oscar Valdizon	Men's 69 kg	130	~~136~~	~~136~~	~~165~~	~~165~~	~~165~~	---	---
Christian López	Men's +105 kg	170	175	~~180~~	~~206~~	~~206~~	206	381	7th
Elida Cojom	Women's 53 kg	62	65	68	83	~~86~~	~~86~~	151	8th
Astrid Camposeco	Women's +75 kg	~~83~~	~~83~~	83	110	115	~~117~~	198	6th

== Wrestling ==
Men

Freestyle

Athlete	Event	Quarterfinals	Semifinals	Final
Athlete	Event	Opposition Result	Opposition Result	Opposition Result
Luis Orantes	55 kg	Juan Ramirez Beltre (DOM); L VT 0 – 5		Bronze medal match: Juan Carlos Valverde (ECU); L VT 0 – 5
