= Laboy =

Laboy is a surname. Notable people with the surname include:

- Coco Laboy (born 1940), Puerto Rican baseball player
- José Torres Laboy (born 1971), Puerto Rican sport shooter
- Travis LaBoy (born 1981), American football linebacker
- Zoé Laboy (born 1964), American attorney and public servant
