= Shooting at the 2011 Pan American Games – Men's double trap =

Shooting – Men's double trap at the 2011 Pan American Games
- Venue: Jalisco Hunting Club
- Dates: October 20
- Competitors: 17 from 11 nations

Medalists
Gold medal	Walton Eller	United States
Silver medal	Jose Torres	Puerto Rico
Bronze medal	Luiz Da Graca	Brazil

The men's double trap shooting event at the 2011 Pan American Games was on October 18 at the Jalisco Hunting Club in Guadalajara. The defending Pan American Games champion is Joshua Richmond of the United States.

The event consisted of two rounds: a qualifier and a final. In the qualifier, each shooter fired 3 sets of 50 shots in trap shooting. Shots were paired, with two targets being launched at a time.

The top 6 shooters in the qualifying round moved on to the final round. There, they fired one additional round of 50. The total score from all 200 shots was used to determine final ranking. Ties are broken using a shoot-off; additional shots are fired one pair at a time until there is no longer a tie.

== Schedule ==
All times are Central Standard Time (UTC-6).

Date	Time	Round
October 20, 2011	9:00	Qualification
October 20, 2011	14:00	Final

== Records ==
The existing world and Pan American Games records were as follows.

Qualification records
World record	Vitaly Fokeev (RUS)	148	Concepción, Chile	March 3, 2011
Pan American record	Lance Bade (USA); Charles Redding (USA); Josh Richmond (USA)	138	Winnipeg, Canada; Winnipeg, Canada; Rio de Janeiro, Brazil	July 30, 1999; July 30, 1999; July 18, 2007

Final records
World record	Hu Binyuan (CHN)	196	Minsk, Belarus	June 10, 2009
Pan American record	Lance Bade (USA)	187	Winnipeg, Canada	July 30, 1999

== Results ==
17 athletes from 11 countries competed.

=== Qualification ===
Rank	Athlete	Country	1	2	3	Total	Notes
1	Walton Eller	United States	49	50	48	147	Q PR
2	Jose Torres	Puerto Rico	43	45	48	136	Q
3	Henry Tejeda	Dominican Republic	46	43	47	136	Q
4	Hebert Brol	Guatemala	43	48	42	133	Q,
5	Luiz Da Graca	Brazil	43	43	46	132	Q
6	Fernando Brol	Guatemala	44	43	45	132	Q
7	Danilo Caro	Colombia	46	42	43	131	
8	Manuel Morales	Dominican Republic	45	44	40	129	
9	Lucas Bennazar	Puerto Rico	42	43	42	128	
10	Filipe Fuzaro	Brazil	45	41	41	127	
11	Adolfo Valdez	Mexico	40	45	40	125	
12	Paul Shaw	Canada	40	41	43	124	
13	Mario Soarez	Venezuela	46	40	38	124	
14	Franco Di Mauro	Venezuela	46	37	39	122	
15	Asier Cilloniz	Peru	34	44	41	119	
16	Michael Daou	Netherlands Antilles	40	36	40	116	
–	Jeffrey Holguin	United States	–	–	–	–	DSQ

=== Final ===
Rank	Athlete	Qual	Final	Total	Notes
1st place, gold medalist(s)	Walton Eller (USA)	147	48	195	FPR
2nd place, silver medalist(s)	Jose Torres (PUR)	136	49	185	
3rd place, bronze medalist(s)	Luis Da Graca (BRA)	132	50	182	
4	Fernando Brol (GUA)	132	48	180	
5	Hebert Brol (GUA)	133	46	179	
5	Henry Tejeda (DOM)	136	43	179	
