= Margaux Isaksen =

American modern pentathlete (born 1991)

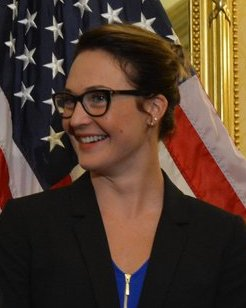
- Isaken in 2016

Personal information
- Born: October 7, 1991 (age 34) Fayetteville, Arkansas, U.S.
- Height: 5 ft 10 in (178 cm)
- Weight: 133 lb (60 kg)

Sport
- Country: United States
- Sport: Modern Pentathlon
- Coached by: Janusz Pyciak-Peciak
Medal record
World Championships
Bronze medal – third place	2015 Berlin	Mixed Relay
Pan American Games
Gold medal – first place	2011 Guadalajara	Individual

Margaux Isaksen (born October 7, 1991) is a modern pentathlete from the United States who competed at the 2008 Summer Olympics in Beijing, China, the 2012 Summer Olympics in London, United Kingdom, and the 2016 Summer Olympics in Rio de Janeiro, Brazil. She placed 4th at the London Olympics after coming from behind but missed a medal.

Isaksen competed at the 2008 Summer Olympics at age 16. She finished in 21st place in the women's modern pentathlon event. She finished first overall in the women's modern pentathlon event at the 2011 Pan American Games. This qualified her for the modern pentathlon event at the 2012 Summer Olympics where she placed fourth, despite having had mononucleosis only a few weeks before. Isaksen went on to win the 2013 Rio World Cup, shortly thereafter.

== Early life ==
Isaksen was born in Fayetteville, Arkansas. She lived in Fayetteville for most of her early life, and grew up riding horses. She has one sibling, Isabella Isaksen, who is also at the Olympic Training Center in Colorado Springs, competing internationally in modern pentathlon. Isaksen's father was the captain of a cruise ship. He died of colon cancer when his daughters were 2 and 6 months old, respectively. Isaksen was raised by her mother, Kathleen West, until she moved in at the Olympic Training center in Colorado Springs, Colorado, sometime during her early teenage years.

On June 1, 2008, at the age of 16, Isaksen qualified for the 2008 Summer Olympics when she received an official Olympic invitation from the Union Internationale de Pentathlon Moderne due to her ranking on the pentathlon world ranking list for the Olympic qualifying period.
