= Top Spin (film) =

2014 sports documentary film

- Poster
- Directed by: Mina T. Son; Sara Newens
- Produced by: Mina T. Son
- Starring: Ariel Hsing; Michael Landers; Lily Zhang
- Edited by: Sara Newens
- Distributed by: The Film Sales Company; First Run Features
- Release date: November 15, 2014 (DOC NYC)
- Running time: 80 minutes
- Languages: English; Chinese

Top Spin is a 2014 feature-length documentary film directed by Mina T. Son and Sara Newens. It follows the road to the 2012 Summer Olympics of three American table tennis teenager players: Ariel Hsing, Michael Landers, and Lily Zhang.

Top Spin has been premiered at the 2014 DOC NYC. The documentary has won the Audience Award and was nominated for Best Documentary at the 2015 CAAMFest. It also won awarded for Best Editing and was nominated for the Best Documentary Feature at the 2015 Los Angeles Asian Pacific Film Festival. Top Spin was also nominated for the Documentary Competition at the 2015 Nashville Film Festival.

It has a 100% rating, with an average score of 7/10 based on 9 reviews, on Rotten Tomatoes. It has a rating of 81 on Metacritic, stating "Universal acclaim based on 5 critics".
