= Modern pentathlon at the 2011 Pan American Games – Women's =

Women's individual at the 2011 Pan American Games
- Venue: Hipica Club
- Dates: October 15
- Competitors: 17 from 10 nations

Medalists
Gold medal	Margaux Isaksen	United States
Silver medal	Yane Marques	Brazil
Bronze medal	Tamara Vega	Mexico

The women's Individual competition of the modern pentathlon events at the 2011 Pan American Games was held on October 15 at the Hipica Club. The defending Pan American Games and the Pan American Championship, champion was Yane Marques of Brazil.

The top placing athlete from North America and South America along with the two other athletes not already qualified awarded spots to compete at the 2012 Summer Olympics in London, Great Britain. The two spots was assigned to the two best placed not already qualified irrespective of region.

Margaux Isaksen of the United States was the Pan American champion.

== Format ==
For the first time at a Pan American Games, the modern pentathlon events will introduce laser shooting (as opposed to pistol shooting) and a combined shooting/running event. Athletes will compete first in epée fencing followed by swimming the 200 metre freestyle, thirdly in equestrian (jumping) and finally in the combined shooting/running event. The athlete that crosses the line first wins.

== Schedule ==
Date	Time	Round
October 15, 2011	9:00	Fencing
October 15, 2011	12:00	Swimming
October 15, 2011	13:30	Equestrian
October 15, 2011	13:30	Combined shooting/running event

== Results ==
Qualified for the 2012 Summer Olympics

Rank	Athlete	Fencing Victories (pts)	Swimming Time (pts)	Equestrian Score (pts)	Combined Shooting/Running Time (pts)	Total Score
1	Margaux Isaksen (USA)	25 (1084)	2:19.93 (1124)	16.00 (1184)	12:38.39 (1968)	5360
2	Yane Marques (BRA)	24 (1056)	2:12.41 (1212)	0.00 (1200)	13:22.13 (1792)	5260
3	Tamara Vega (MEX)	14 (776)	2:20.60 (1116)	92.00 (1108)	12:41.56 (1956)	4956
4	Melanie McCann (CAN)	21 (972)	2:22.56 (1092)	60.00 (1140)	13:52.95 (1672)	4876
5	Thelma Martinez (MEX)	15 (804)	2:23.39 (1080)	0.00 (1200)	13:30.11 (1760)	4844
6	Stephany Garza (GUA)	21 (972)	2:26.76 (1040)	40.00 (1160)	13:53.80 (1668)	4840
7	Suzanne Stettinius (USA)	16 (832)	2:27.23 (1036)	136.00 (1064)	13:06.81 (1856)	4788
8	Pamela Zapata (ARG)	19 (916)	2:33.34 (960)	28.00 (1172)	13:46.53 (1696)	4744
9	Priscila Oliveira (BRA)	15 (804)	2:17.10 (1156)	36.00 (1164)	14:12.46 (1592)	4716
10	Donna Vakalis (CAN)	13 (748)	2:26.30 (1048)	32.00 (1168)	13:38.51 (1728)	4692
11	Leidy Moya (CUB)	16 (832)	2:27.24 (1036)	212.00 (988)	13:20.26 (1800)	4656
12	Kenia Campos (CUB)	19 (916)	2:25.61 (1056)	192.00 (1008)	14:21.95 (1556)	4536
13	Ayelen Zapata (ARG)	10 (664)	2:37.97 (908)	20.00 (1180)	14:23.84 (1548)	4300
14	Geraldina Garzo (GUA)	13 (748)	2:34.85 (944)	16.00 (1184)	15:12.22 (1352)	4228
15	Adriana Israliantz (VEN)	11 (692)	2:36.47 (924)	44.00 (1156)	18:14.25 (624)	3396
16	Javiera Rosas (CHI)	16 (832)	2:28.39 (1020)	508.00 (692)	24:08.87 (0)	2544
17	Cindy Merizalde (ECU)	4 (496)	2:56.07 (688)	DNF (0)	24:08.38 (0)	1184
