= José Torres Laboy =

Puerto Rican sport shooter (born 1971)

Personal information
- Nationality: Puerto Rico
- Born: 8 September 1971 (age 54) Salinas, Puerto Rico
- Height: 1.85 m (6 ft 1 in)
- Weight: 91 kg (201 lb)

Sport
- Sport: Shooting
- Events: Trap, double trap
- Coached by: Jon Ogilvie
Medal record
Men's shooting
Representing Puerto Rico
Pan American Games
Silver medal – second place	2011 Guadalajara	Double trap

José Torres Laboy (born September 8, 1971, in Salinas) is a Puerto Rican sport shooter. He won a silver medal in the men's double trap at the 2011 Pan American Games in Guadalajara, Mexico, accumulating a score of 185 targets (136 in the qualifying round and 49 in the final).

At age 40, Torres held his distinction of being the oldest member of the Puerto Rican team to be selected for the 2012 Summer Olympics in London, where he competed in the men's double trap. He scored a total of 127 targets in the qualifying rounds by one point ahead of U.S. shooter and defending Olympic champion Walton Eller, finishing only in twenty-first place.
