= Lily Zhang =

American table tennis player (born 1996)

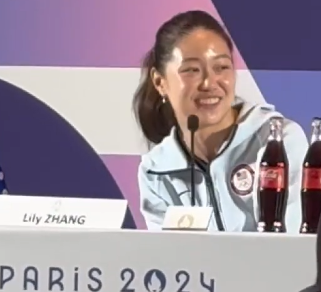
- Lily Zhang in 2024

Personal information
- Full name: Lily Ann Zhang
- Nationality: United States
- Born: June 16, 1996 (age 30) Redwood City, California, U.S.
- Height: 5 ft 4.5 in (164 cm)
- Weight: 118 lb (54 kg)

Sport
- Sport: Table tennis
- Playing style: Shakehand, all-round attack
- Highest ranking: 21 (January 2023)
- Current ranking: 32 (28 September 2026)
Medal record
Women's table tennis
Representing United States
World Championships
| Bronze medal – third place | 2021 Houston | Mixed doubles |
Pan American Games
| Gold medal – first place | 2015 Toronto | Team |
| Silver medal – second place | 2019 Lima | Doubles |
| Bronze medal – third place | 2015 Toronto | Singles |
| Bronze medal – third place | 2011 Guadalajara | Team |
| Bronze medal – third place | 2011 Guadalajara | Singles |
| Bronze medal – third place | 2019 Lima | Team |
Pan American Championships
| Gold medal – first place | 2019 Asunción | Singles |
| Gold medal – first place | 2019 Asunción | Doubles |
| Gold medal – first place | 2019 Asunción | Mixed doubles |
| Gold medal – first place | 2019 Asunción | Team |
| Silver medal – second place | 2018 Santiago | Doubles |
| Silver medal – second place | 2018 Santiago | Team |
| Silver medal – second place | 2025 Rock Hill | Team |
| Bronze medal – third place | 2021 Lima | Singles |
| Bronze medal – third place | 2025 Rock Hill | Singles |
Pan American Cup
| Gold medal – first place | 2017 San Jose | Singles |
| Silver medal – second place | 2020 Guaynabo | Singles |
| Silver medal – second place | 2025 San Francisco | Singles |
Youth Olympic Games
| Bronze medal – third place | 2014 Nanjing | Singles |

Lily Ann Zhang
- Traditional Chinese: 張安
- Simplified Chinese: 张安
Transcriptions
Standard Mandarin
- Hanyu Pinyin: Zhāng Ān

Lily Ann Zhang (born June 16, 1996) is an American table tennis player who competed in the 2012 Summer Olympics in London with teammates Ariel Hsing and Erica Wu. She also competed in the 2016 Summer Olympics in Rio with teammates Zheng Jiaqi and Wu Yue. She is a six-time US national champion in women's singles, having won in 2012, 2014, 2016, 2017, 2019 and 2022. In 2011, she was a bronze medalist in women's singles and women's team at the Pan American Games and won the women's doubles title at the Qatar Peace and Sport Cup. She is a member of the United States National Women's team. She has been ranked #2 in the cadet (U-15) world ranking and #5 in the junior (U-18) world ranking.

== Life ==
Lily Zhang was born on June 16, 1996, in Redwood City, California, to Chinese parents. Her family lived on the campus of Stanford University, where her father was then a mathematics professor. Zhang played table tennis with her parents while she was growing up.

She graduated from Palo Alto High School in 2014 before enrolling at the University of California, Berkeley. After her first year, Zhang took a year off to train for the 2016 Olympic Games. For a part of her gap year, she trained and played in the Austrian league and trained at her home club, ICC.

Zhang is featured in the documentary Top Spin.

She is sponsored by JOOLA Table Tennis.

== U.S. career ==
When Zhang was 7 years old, Dennis Davis, the president and head coach of the Palo Alto Table Tennis Club and the North American representative of the junior commission of International Table Tennis Federation, began training her. When she was 11, Zhang made the U.S. Cadet Team. By age 12, Zhang became the youngest player to ever make the U.S. Women's Team, and when she was 13 years old, she was the #2 ranked Junior Girls' table tennis player in the United States.

At the 2010 and 2011 U.S. National Championships, Zhang won the title in the junior girls' event and was the runner-up in women's singles. In 2012, she won her first national championship in women's singles, beating defending champion Ariel Hsing in 7 games.

=== Major League Table Tennis ===
In 2023, Zhang joined Major League Table Tennis (MLTT) as a member of the Bay Area Blasters for the league's inaugural season.

=== Season 1 (2023–24) ===
During the 2023–24 season, Zhang helped lead the Bay Area Blasters to a first-place finish in the West Division with a 12–10 regular-season record.

=== Season 2 (2024–25) ===
Following her participation in the 2024 Summer Olympics, Zhang rejoined the Blasters in January 2025 for the second half of Season 2.

=== Season 3 (2025–26) ===
In Season 3, Zhang achieved several statistical milestones. In November 2025, she was named the MLTT Women's Player of the Week for Week 6 after winning seven of her nine matches, including a two-game victory over Mo Zhang.

On December 5, 2025, Zhang became the first female player to reach the No. 1 position in the MLTT official player power rankings, surpassing Seungmin Cho with a rating of 787.4. Through the first half of the season, she maintained a 15–6 (71.4%) singles win record. In February 2026, she secured a win for the Blasters in a match against the Chicago Wind by winning an "Ultimate Golden Point" during the Golden Game format. She plays for the Bay Area Blasters in Major League Table Tennis, which started in 2023, and was the first female player to top its power rankings.

== International career ==
=== 2011 Pan American Games ===
Zhang participated in the 2011 Pan American Games where she played both as an individual and as part of the United States team. The US team won a bronze medal and she also won a bronze medal in women's singles.

=== Qatar Peace and Sport Cup ===
On November 22, 2011, Zhang and Russian player Anna Tikhomirova won the Women's Doubles title at the Qatar Peace and Sport Cup.

=== 2012 Olympics ===
After qualifying for the last singles position on the 2012 United States Olympic Team by beating Canada's Anqi Luo in five games in the North American Olympic Trials, Zhang went into the London Olympics as the youngest player in the table tennis competition and was seeded 49th. In the first round, Zhang lost in straight games to Croatian player Cornelia Molnar (11–6, 11–8, 11–7, 11–5).

The United States team play second-seeded Japan in the first round of proceedings. Zhang lost to Sayaka Hirano in straight games (11–9, 11–5, 11–3) and teamed with Erica Wu in the doubles to lose to Kasumi Ishikawa and Ai Fukuhara, also in straight games (11–7, 11–7, 11–1).

=== 2012 North American Championships ===
On September 2, 2012, Zhang won the women's singles title at the ITTF North American Championships with a victory over Erica Wu in straight games (11–8, 11–3, 11–7, 11–9). She had previously (in 2011 and 2010) failed to achieve the title, with losses in the finals on both occasions to Canada's Mo Zhang.

=== 2012 World Junior Championships ===
At the 2012 ITTF World Junior Championships in Hyderabad, India, Lily Zhang reached the quarterfinals in singles and also led the USA into the quarterfinals of the team competition. As a result of her performance during the championships (12 wins, 2 losses), Zhang broke into the top 100 of the ITTF women's world ranking for the first time in her career.

=== 2013 U.S. Open ===
At the 2013 U.S. Open, Zhang won the title in the junior girls' event. In women's singles (part of the ITTF World Tour), she beat Mo Zhang to advance to the semi-final, where she lost to Elizabeta Samara in 5 games. Following this tournament, Zhang's world ranking improved to a career-high 84.

=== 2014 Youth Olympic Games ===
In August 2014, Lily Zhang was the first ever US athlete to win a bronze medal in the 2014 Summer Youth Olympics. In the contest for bronze, she won over Miyu Kato of Japan in six games.

=== 2019 ITTF Women's World Cup ===
She came in fourth place at the 2019 ITTF Women's World Cup, losing 3–4 to Feng Tianwei. Zhang's performance included a high-profile upset over Miu Hirano.

=== 2020 ITTF Women's World Cup ===
At the 2020 World Cup, Zhang won with an upset over Feng Tianwei.

=== 2020 Olympics ===
At the 2020 Summer Olympics, after losing the first game in her opening round match against Nigeria's Offiong Edem, Zhang regrouped with a 4–1 victory.

=== 2024 Olympics ===
Zhang competed for the United States at the table tennis event in the 2024 Summer Olympics. She placed 9th in the women's singles. She also played in the women's team with Amy Wang and Rachel Sung, placing 14th in the event.
