= Lady Ruano =

Colombian table tennis player

Lady Ruano (born March 5, 1981) is a Colombian table tennis player. She competed at the 2016 Summer Olympics in the women's singles event, in which she was eliminated in the first round by Iveta Vacenovská.
