= Erica Wu =

American table tennis player (born 1996)

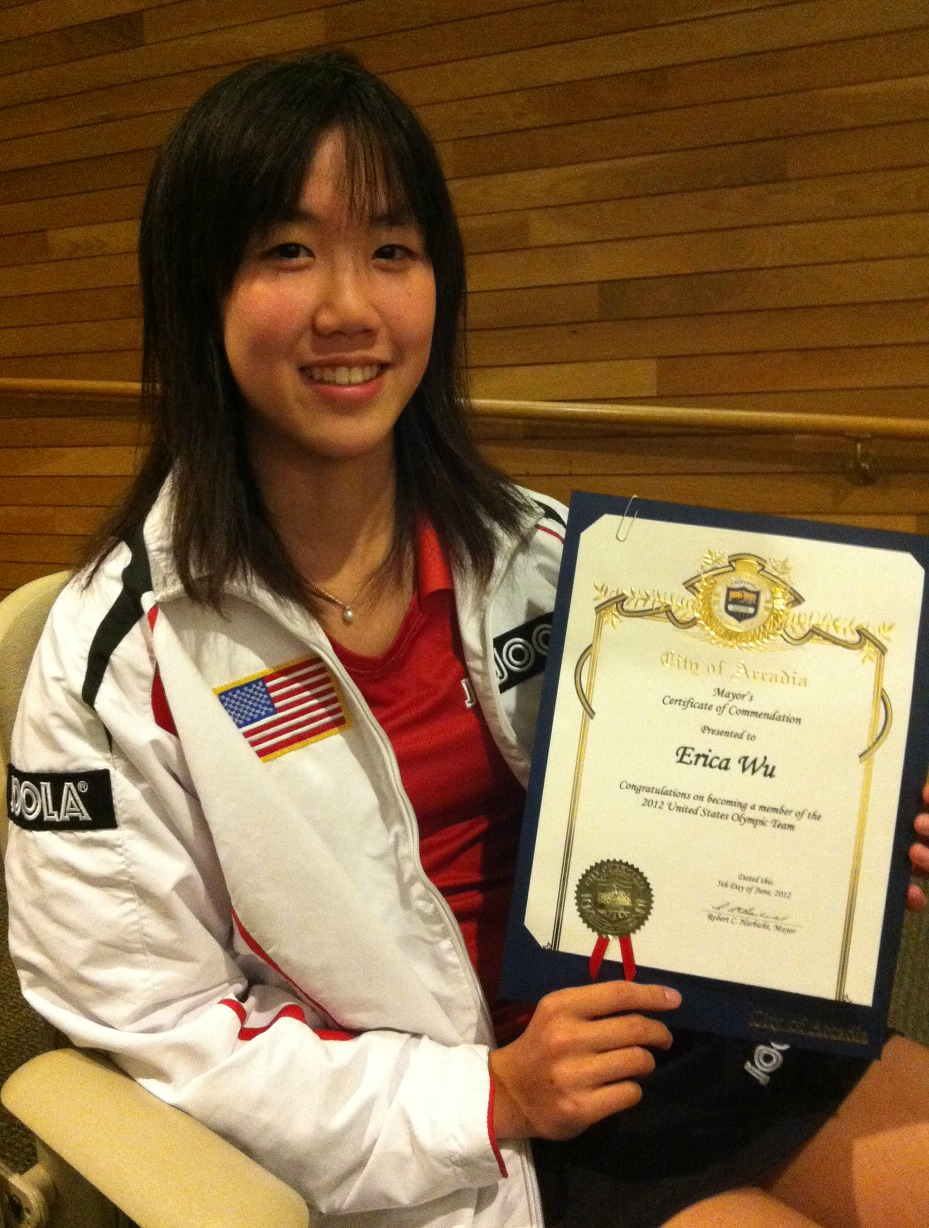
- Wu in 2012

Personal information
- Nationality: United States
- Born: May 15, 1996 (age 30) Arcadia, California, U.S.
- Height: 5 ft 6 in (1.68 m)
- Weight: 119 lb (54 kg)

Sport
- Sport: Table tennis
Medal record
Women's table tennis
Representing the United States
Pan American Games
Bronze medal – third place	2011 Guadalajara	Team
North American Championships
Silver medal – second place	2012 Cary	Singles

Erica Wu
- Traditional Chinese: 吳炫寧
- Simplified Chinese: 吴炫宁
Transcriptions
Standard Mandarin
- Hanyu Pinyin: Wú Xuànníng
- Wade–Giles: Wu^{2} Hsüan^{4}-ning^{2}

Erica Shen-Ning Wu (born May 15, 1996) is an American table tennis player who competed in the 2012 Summer Olympics in London. She was the 2011 and 2012 US national champion in women's doubles (with Gao Jun) and reached the semifinals in women's singles at the 2011, 2012 and 2013 US national championships. She was part of the US team that won the bronze medal at the 2011 Pan American Games. At the 2012 North American Championships, Wu was the runner-up in women's singles behind fellow Olympian Lily Zhang. As of 2018 she was a senior at Princeton University studying computer science. Between 2018 and 2022, she worked as a Software Engineer at Meta.

== Personal life ==
Erica Wu was born in Arcadia, California. Her parents are Taiwanese immigrants who worked as actuaries. She is an only child.
