= Ariel Hsing =

American table tennis player

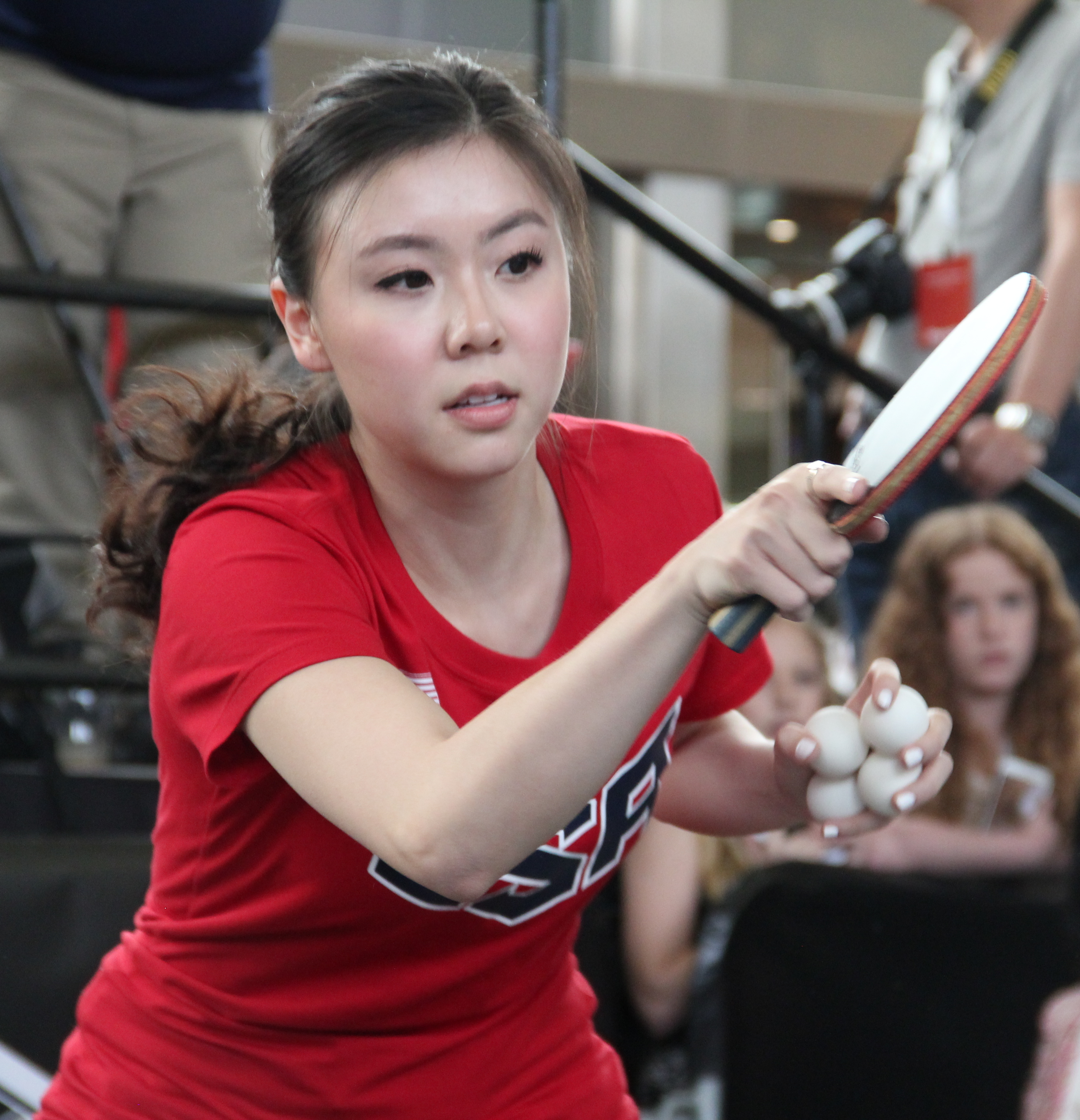
- Hsing at the Berkshire Hathaway Shareholder's Weekend, 2018

Personal information
- Full name: Ariel Yenhua Hsing
- Born: November 29, 1995 (age 30) Fremont, California, U.S.
- Home town: San Jose, California, U.S.
- Height: 5 ft 5 in (165 cm)
- Weight: 117 lb (53 kg)

Sport
- Sport: Table tennis
- Club: Jinhua Bank (China)
- Playing style: Shakehand
- Highest ranking: 73 (October 2012)
Medal record
Women's table tennis
Representing United States
Intercontinental Cup
Gold medal – first place	2012 Huangshi	Singles
Pan American Games
Bronze medal – third place	2011 Guadalajara	Team
Bronze medal – third place	2011 Guadalajara	Singles
North American Championships
Gold medal – first place	2013 Vancouver	Singles
North America Cup
Gold medal – first place	2012 Mississauga	Singles
Gold medal – first place	2011 Mississauga	Singles

Ariel Yenhua Hsing
- Traditional Chinese: 邢延華
- Simplified Chinese: 邢延华
Transcriptions
Standard Mandarin
- Hanyu Pinyin: Xíng Yánhuá
- Wade–Giles: Hsing^{2} Yen^{2}-hua^{2}

Ariel Yenhua Hsing (born November 29, 1995) is an American table tennis player who competed in the 2012 Summer Olympics.

Hsing became the youngest U.S. table tennis national champion in history in 2010 at age 15. She repeated as champion in 2011 and 2013. She is the first player from North America to win the Intercontinental Cup in 2012 with participants from Africa, Latin America, North America, and Oceania.

She was a bronze medalist in women's team and women's singles at the 2011 Pan American Games. Hsing was the women's singles champion at the North American Championships in the year 2013, and at the North America Cup in the year 2011 and 2012. During her junior career, she was ranked as high as 4th in the world in both the cadet (U-15) and the junior (U-18) age group.

In May 2014, she became the first American-born player in the China Table Tennis Super League, signing a contract with Zhejiang Jinhua Bank.

== Early life ==
Hsing was born in Fremont, California, in the San Francisco Bay Area. Her mother, Xin Hua Jiang (Chinese: 姜新华; pinyin: Jiāng Xīnhuá), was born in China, and grew up in Henan Province. Her father, Michael Hsing (Chinese: 邢冀北; pinyin: Xíng Jìběi), is a computer engineer who was born in Taiwan.

Hsing started playing table tennis when her parents could not find a babysitter one night and brought the then seven-year-old to the Palo Alto Table Tennis Club with them. She joined the Palo Alto Table Tennis Club junior training program under the head coach Dennis Davis.

Ariel played her first table tennis tournament “2003 California Open” at age 7. She didn't quite know how to serve legally and was faulted more than ten times. She hung in there and won her first tournament.

At age eight and a few days old, Ariel won her first national title “Girls 10 and Under” at the 2003 U.S. Nationals at Las Vegas. She then successfully defended her title in 2004 and 2005. On a side note, Ariel's mom also won a trophy at the same tournament.

In July 2005, Ariel won all her matches at the 2005 Junior Olympics/Nationals held at New Orleans. She brought home six gold medals and a special “Joel Ferrell Sportsmanship Award,” which had her name engraved on a special plaque at the AAU (Amateur Athletic Union) National Headquarter.

== Career ==
In 2012, Hsing won the singles titles at the ITTF North American Cup and the United States Junior and Cadet Open. She qualified for the 2012 Summer Olympics and was seeded 46th in women's singles.

Hsing is acquaintances with Warren Buffett and Bill Gates and used to refer to them as "Uncle Warren" and "Uncle Bill". She met Buffett at age 9 when one of Buffett's friends retained a table tennis coach for Buffett at his seventy-fifth birthday party and it was decided to have the 9-year-old Hsing play Buffett as a joke. Since then, Ariel has been invited to the Berkshire Hathaway Annual Shareholders Meeting to play table tennis with Warren Buffett, Bill Gates, and the stockholders. Gates was present during Hsing's Round of 32 loss during the 2012 Olympics and hugged her as she left the court.

On July 9, 2012, she appeared on an episode of the Nickelodeon game show Figure It Out. She stumped panelists Ciara Bravo, Alex Heartman, Leon Thomas III and Stephen Kramer Glickman, for one round.

== 2012 London Olympics ==
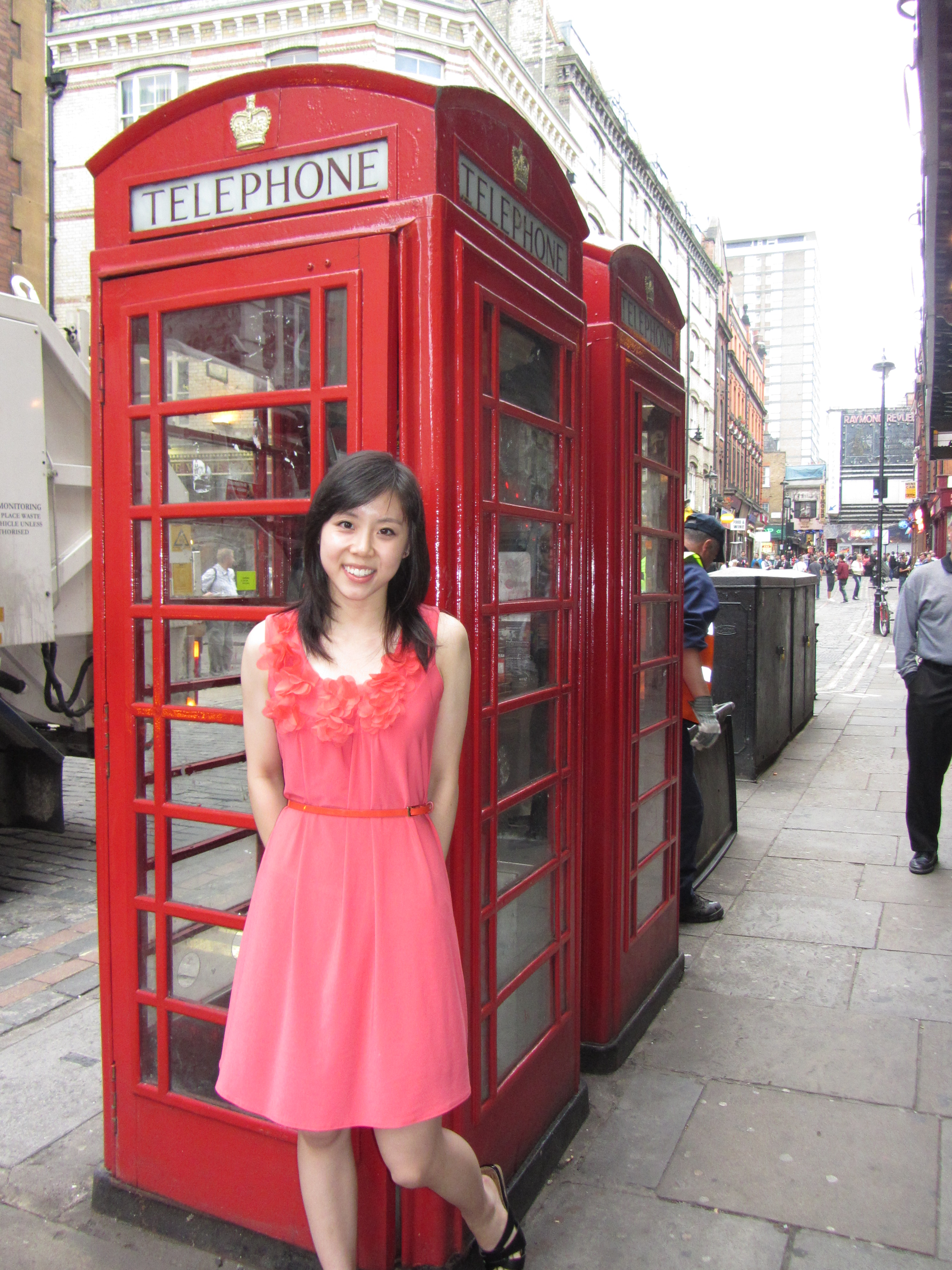
Ariel Hsing in London during the 2012 Olympics

Hsing entered the Olympics as the 46th seed and ranked 115th in the world.

In the round of 128 Hsing defeated Yadira Silva in 4 games (11-9, 11–8, 11–3, 11-5) in a match where she never trailed by more than 2 points. In the round of 64 Hsing defeated Ni Xia Lian of Luxembourg 4-2 (11-9, 10–12, 11–9, 11–5, 10–12, 12-10), In the round of 32 Hsing lost to the #2 seed and eventual gold medalist Li Xiaoxia of China 4-2 (11-4, 9-11, 11–6, 6-11, 11–8, 11-9) with the longest rally of 18 occurring in game 6.

After the loss Hsing said it was the best she had ever performed at a tournament giving herself a "10 out of 10, or maybe 9.9 as I wasn't quite there."

== Personal life ==
Hsing has been blogging for espnW for her Olympic journey.

After the Olympics, Hsing was selected as the 2012 Female High School Athlete of the year by San Jose Sports Hall of Fame.

Hsing graduated from Valley Christian High School in San Jose in 2013. She is a graduate of Princeton University and was elected as Social Chair for the Class of 2017. Hsing speaks both English and Mandarin Chinese.

She is featured in the documentary Top Spin directed by Mina T. Son and Sara Newens.

Ariel participated in Andy Akiho's Ping Pong Concerto, world premiered in Shanghai on July 18, 2015, at Shanghai Symphony Hall by Shanghai Symphony Orchestra. Ping Pong Concerto has also performed in Beijing, Guangzhou, Foshan, and is scheduled to perform in London and Hong Kong.

Ariel is a contributing author of "2 Billion Under 20: How Millennials Are Breaking Down Age Barriers and Changing the World" by Stacey Ferreira and Jared Kleinert, which became the #1 New Release in Business Leadership on Amazon.

In 2016, with her independent study of "Chinese Stock Market Anomalies: An Empirical Analysis,” Ariel was selected by China Hands Magazine as the 25 under 25: Leaders in U.S.-China Relations, which "profiles 25 students and professionals under the age of 25 who have demonstrated exceptional promise in China studies and in furthering the future of the U.S.-China relationship."

== Competition records ==
- 2015 North American Collegiate Championship – Women's Team Champion (Princeton University)
- 2015 National Collegiate Table Tennis Association (NCTTA) Championship – Women's Doubles Champion
- 2014 National Collegiate Table Tennis Association (NCTTA) Championship – Women's Team Champion (Princeton University)
- 2014 National Collegiate Table Tennis Association (NCTTA) Championship – Women's Singles Champion
- 2013 North American Championship – Women's Singles Champion
- 2013 North American Championship – Junior Girls' Team Champion
- 2013 North American Championship – Junior Girls' Singles Champion
- 2013 US Open – Women's Doubles, Mixed Doubles, Women's U21-Silver
- 2012 ITTF Intercontinental Cup – Women's Champion
- 2012 North America Cup – Women's Champion
- 2012 ITTF Brazil Open – Women's U21 Champion
- 2012 ITTF USA Junior & Cadet Open – Junior Girls Singles, Doubles, and Team Champions.
- 2011 North American Championship and Cup Women's Champion
- 2011 ITTF Junior Circuit Finals – Girls Singles 3rd place.
- 2011 Pan American Games – Women Team Bronze medalist
- 2011 Pan American Games – Women Singles Bronze medalist
- 2011 JUIC International Jr. & Cadet – Open Champion
- 2011 Canadian Junior Open – Team and doubles Champion, Single 2nd
- 2010 ITTF Global Cadet Challenge – Girls Single 3rd place
- 2010 ITTF Global Cadet Challenge – Girls Doubles 2nd place
- 2010 Inaugural Youth Olympic Games – USA representative
- 2010 North America Championship – Cadet Girls singles Champion
- 2010 North America Championship – Junior Girls 2nd place
- 2010 North America Championship Junior Girls Team Champion
- 2010 China vs. World Team Challenge – Represented Junior Girls World team finished 2nd place.
- 2010 Italian Junior & Cadet Open – Cadet Girls Singles Champion
- 2010 Italian Junior & Cadet Open – Cadet Girls Doubles Champion
- 2010 Safir International – Girls Under 16 Champion
- 2010 PanAm Youth Olympics Trial in El Salvador – Girls First Place
- 2009 North America Championship – Cadet Girls singles Champion
- 2009 North America Championship – Junior Girls singles Champion
- 2009 North America Championship Junior Girls Team Champion
- 2009 Pan American ITTF Cadet Challenge Trial Champion
- 2009 Canadian Junior open Cadet Champion
- 2009 Canadian Junior open Cadet Doubles Champion
- 2009 Canadian Junior open Junior Team Champion
- 2008 Pan American Junior Girls champion
- 2008 North America Championship – Cadet Girls singles Champion
- 2008 North America Championship – Junior Girls singles Champion
- 2007 U.S. National Championship – Junior Girls Singles Champion
- 2007 U.S. National Championship – Cadet Girls Singles Champion
- 2007 U.S. National Championship – Girls 13 and Under Singles Champion
- 2007 U.S. Open Championship – Girls 13 and under Singles Champion
- 2007 North America Championship – Cadet Girls singles Champion
- 2007 North America Championship – Cadet Girls Team Champion
- 2006 U.S. National Championship – Cadet Girls Singles Champion
- 2006 U.S. National Championship – Girls 13 and Under Singles Champion
- 2006 U.S. Open Championship – Girls 15 and under Singles Champion
- 2006 U.S. Open Championship – Girls 13 and under Singles Champion
- 2006 U.S. Open Championship – Girls 11 and under Singles Champion
- 2005 U.S. National Championship – Cadet Girls Singles 2nd place
- 2005 U.S. National Championship – Girl 10 and under Singles Champion
- 2005 Junior National under 10 Girls: Gold
- 2005 Junior National under 12 Girls: Gold
- 2005 Junior National under 14 Girls: Gold
- 2005 Junior Olympic under 10 Girls: Gold
- 2005 Junior Olympic under 12 Girl double: Gold
- 2005 Junior Olympic team under 16 girls: Gold
- 2005 Junior National/Olympic Joel Ferrell Sportsmanship Award
- 2004 U.S. National Championship – Girl 10 and under Singles Champion
- 2003 U.S. National Championship – Girl 10 and under Singles Champion
