= Mo Zhang (table tennis) =

Canadian table tennis player

Personal information
- Full name: Mo Zhang
- Nationality: Canada
- Born: 17 January 1989 (age 37) Shijiazhuang, China
- Height: 173 cm (5 ft 8 in)
- Weight: 57 kg (126 lb)

Sport
- Sport: Table tennis
- Club: National Training Center, Ottawa
- Playing style: Shakehand
- Equipment: Butterfly
- Highest ranking: 21 (May 2018)
- Current ranking: 51 (28 September 2026)
Medal record
Women's table tennis
Representing Canada
Pan American Championships
Bronze medal – third place	2025 Rock Hill	Singles
Pan American Games
Gold medal – first place	2011 Guadalajara	Singles
Gold medal – first place	2019 Lima	Mixed doubles
Silver medal – second place	2007 Rio de Janeiro	Team
Bronze medal – third place	2015 Toronto	Team
Bronze medal – third place	2019 Lima	Doubles
Bronze medal – third place	2019 Lima	Team
Bronze medal – third place	2023 Santiago	Mixed doubles
Commonwealth Games
Bronze medal – third place	2014 Glasgow	Doubles
Commonwealth Championships
Gold medal – first place	2013 New Delhi	Singles
North American Championships
Gold medal – first place	2006 Rochester	Doubles
Gold medal – first place	2009 Laval	Singles
Gold medal – first place	2010 Grand Rapids	Singles
Gold medal – first place	2011 Mississauga	Singles
Gold medal – first place	2013 Vancouver	Team
Gold medal – first place	2014 Mississauga	Singles
Gold medal – first place	2014 Mississauga	Team
Silver medal – second place	2006 Rochester	Singles
Silver medal – second place	2007 Laval	Singles
Silver medal – second place	2008 Las Vegas	Singles
Silver medal – second place	2013 Vancouver	Singles
North America Cup
Gold medal – first place	2011 Mississauga	Team
Gold medal – first place	2014 Burnaby	Singles
Gold medal – first place	2015 Markham	Singles
Silver medal – second place	2011 Mississauga	Singles
Silver medal – second place	2012 Mississauga	Singles

Mo Zhang (Chinese: 張墨; born 17 January 1989) is a female Chinese-born table tennis player who now represents Canada. She was born in Shijiazhuang, and currently resides in Vancouver.

== Career ==
She competed at the 2008 Summer Olympics, reaching the third round of the singles competition.

With her win at the 2011 Pan American Games in Guadalajara, Mexico, she qualified for the London 2012 Olympic Games.

She won a bronze medal in the women's doubles with Anqi Luo at the 2014 Commonwealth Games in Glasgow.

In June 2016, she was officially named to Canada's 2016 Olympic team. At the 2016 Summer Olympics, she lost in the second round to Hungary's Georgina Póta.

She represented Canada at the 2020 Summer Olympics. Zhang qualified for her fifth Olympics in 2024.

== Major League Table Tennis (MLTT) ==
In 2024, Zhang joined Major League Table Tennis (MLTT), the first professional table tennis league in the United States, as a member of the Chicago Wind franchise.

=== Season 2 (2024–2025): Female MVP ===
During her debut season, Zhang led the Chicago Wind to a second-place finish in the East Division with an 11–7 record. She established herself as the league's most consistent female singles presence, finishing the regular season with a 25–20 singles record and a 50.5% point-win rate in the "Golden Game"—MLTT’s signature team race-to-21 format. For her performance, she was named the MLTT Season 2 Female MVP. Under her leadership, the Wind reached the league's first-ever Championship Weekend, ultimately finishing fourth overall in the postseason.

=== Season 3 (2025–2026) ===
Following the league's expansion to ten teams, Zhang remained with the Chicago Wind as they realigned to the West Division for the 2025–26 season. As of March 2026, the Wind held a 12–6 record, with Zhang maintaining her status as one of the league's top-rated female players. Her tactical use of short-pips, described by league analysts as "chaos and control," continued to make her one of the most difficult opponents in the league.

== Career results ==
=== North American Table Tennis Championships ===
- (silver) 2013 Vancouver: Runner-up Women's Singles
- (gold) 2011 Mississauga: Winner Women's Singles
- (gold) 2010 Grand Rapids: Winner Women's Singles
- (gold) 2009 Laval: Winner Women's Singles
- (gold) 2006 Rochester: Winner Women's Doubles
- (silver) 2008 Las Vegas: Runner-up Women's Singles
- (silver) 2007 Laval: Runner-up Women's Singles
- (silver) 2006 Rochester: Runner-up Women's Singles

=== North America Cup ===
- (gold) 2015 Markham: Winner Women's Singles
- (gold) 2014 Burnaby: Winner Women's Singles
- (silver) 2012 Mississauga: Runner-up Women's Singles
- (silver) 2011 Mississauga: Runner-up Women's Singles
- (gold) 2011 Mississauga: Winner Women's Team

=== Pan American Games ===
- (bronze) 2015 Toronto: Bronze Women's Team
- (gold) 2011 Guadalajara: Winner Women's Singles
- (silver) 2007 Rio de Janeiro: Runner-up Women's Team

=== ITTF Pan-America Cup ===
- (silver) 2019: Runner-up Women's Singles
- (gold) 2018: Winner Women's Singles
- (silver) 2017: Runner-up Women's Singles
