= Zheng Jiaqi =

American table tennis player

Personal information
- Nationality: United States
- Born: January 13, 1988 (age 38) Zaozhuang, Shandong, China

Sport
- Sport: Table tennis
Medal record
Women's table tennis
Representing United States
Pan American Games
Gold medal – first place	2015 Toronto	Team

Zheng Jiaqi (Chinese: 郑佳奇; born January 13, 1988) is an American table tennis player. She had competed at the 2016 Summer Olympics as part of the American team in the women's team event.
