= Luisana Pérez (table tennis) =

Venezuelan table tennis player

Luisana Pérez OLY
Personal information
- Born: 24 August 1976 (age 50) Caracas, Venezuela

Sport
- Sport: Table tennis

Luisana Pérez (born 24 August 1976) is a Venezuelan table tennis player. She competed at the 2000 Summer Olympics and the 2004 Summer Olympics.
