= Johenny Valdez =

Dominican table tennis player (born 1986)

Personal information
- Full name: Johenny Valdez Reyes
- Nationality: Dominican Republic
- Born: 12 December 1986 (age 39)
- Height: 1.68 m (5 ft 6 in)
- Weight: 57 kg (126 lb)

Sport
- Sport: Table tennis
- Playing style: Right-handed, classic
- Highest ranking: 502 (January 2012)
- Current ranking: 542 (February 2013)
Medal record
Women's table tennis
Representing the Dominican Republic
Pan American Games
Gold medal – first place	2011 Guadalajara	Team
Bronze medal – third place	2007 Rio de Janeiro	Team

Johenny Valdez Reyes (born 12 December 1986) is a Dominican table tennis player. She won a gold medal in the women's team event at the 2011 Pan American Games in Guadalajara, Mexico. As of February 2013, Valdez is ranked no. 542 in the world by the International Table Tennis Federation (ITTF). She is also right-handed, and uses the classic grip.

Valdez qualified for the inaugural women's team event at the 2008 Summer Olympics in Beijing, by receiving a continental spot for the Americas under the ITTF's Computer Team Ranking List. Playing with Chinese emigrants Lian Qian and Wu Xue, Valdez placed fourth in the preliminary pool round, against China, Austria, and Croatia, with a total of three points and three straight losses.
