= Lisi Castillo =

Cuban table tennis player

Personal information
- Nationality: Cuban
- Born: 4 April 1985 (age 40)

Sport
- Sport: Table tennis

Lisi Castillo (born 3 April 1985) is a Cuban table tennis player. Her highest career ITTF ranking was 169.
