= Luca Kumahara =

Brazilian table tennis player

Personal information
- Nationality: Brazil
- Born: July 27, 1995 (age 30) São Paulo, São Paulo, Brazil

Sport
- Sport: Table tennis
- Playing style: Right-handed, shakehand grip
Medal record
Women's table tennis
Representing Brazil
Pan American Games
Silver medal – second place	2015 Toronto	Team
Silver medal – second place	2019 Lima	Team
Bronze medal – third place	2015 Toronto	Singles
Pan American Championships
Bronze medal – third place	2021 Lima	Singles
Bronze medal – third place	2021 Lima	Mixed doubles
Latin American Championships
Gold medal – first place	2012 Rio de Janeiro	Team
Gold medal – first place	2013 San Salvador	Singles
Gold medal – first place	2013 San Salvador	Mixed doubles
Gold medal – first place	2013 San Salvador	Team
Gold medal – first place	2014 Santo Domingo	Team
Gold medal – first place	2016 San Juan	Team
Bronze medal – third place	2014 Santo Domingo	Singles
Bronze medal – third place	2014 Santo Domingo	Doubles
Latin American Cup
Gold medal – first place	2012 San Jose	Singles
Gold medal – first place	2014 Asuncion	Singles
Gold medal – first place	2015 Havana	Singles
Bronze medal – third place	2013 Santo Domingo	Singles

Luca Aiko Kumahara , born July 27, 1995) is a table tennis player from Brazil. He competed at the 2012 Summer Olympics, 2016 Summer Olympics and 2020 Summer Olympics.

He is the first trans athlete to compete in table tennis at an international level.

== Personal life ==
Luca is a trans man.
