= Anqi Luo =

Canadian table tennis player

Personal information
- Nationality: Canadian
- Born: 26 August 1996 (age 30) Foshan, China
- Height: 1.63 m (5 ft 4 in)
- Weight: 53 kg (117 lb)

Sport
- Sport: Table tennis
Medal record
Table tennis
Representing Canada
Commonwealth Games
Bronze medal – third place	2014 Glasgow	Women's doubles
Pan American Games
Bronze medal – third place	2015 Toronto	Women's team
- Updated on 2 August 2014

Anqi Luo (born 26 August 1996) is a table tennis player competing for Canada. She won a bronze medal in the women's doubles with Zhang Mo at the 2014 Commonwealth Games in Glasgow.
