= Colombia at the 2011 Pan American Games =

- IOC code: COL
- NOC: Colombian Olympic Committee
- Website: www.olimpicocol.co (in Spanish)

in Guadalajara 14–30 October 2011
- Competitors: 288 in 31 sports
- Flag bearer: Mariana Pajón
- Medals Ranked 6th: Gold 24 Silver 25 Bronze 35 Total 84

Pan American Games appearances (overview)
- 1951; 1955; 1959; 1963; 1967; 1971; 1975; 1979; 1983; 1987; 1991; 1995; 1999; 2003; 2007; 2011; 2015; 2019; 2023; 2027

Colombia competed at the 2011 Pan American Games in Guadalajara, Mexico from October 14 to 30, 2011. Colombia's team consisted of 284 athletes in 31 sports.

== Medalists ==
Medal	Name	Sport	Event	Date
Gold	Héctor Leonardo Páez	Cycling	Men's Cross-Country	October 15
Gold	María Luisa Calle	Cycling	Women's road time trial	October 16
Gold	Marlon Pérez Arango	Cycling	Men's road time trial	October 16
Gold	Juan Esteban Arango, Edwin Ávila, Arles Castro, Weimar Roldán	Cycling	Men's team pursuit	October 17
Gold	Miguel Ángel Rodríguez	Squash	Men's singles	October 17
Gold	Juan Esteban Arango	Cycling	Men's Omnium Track	October 19
Gold	Fabián Puerta	Cycling	Men's Keirin	October 20
Gold	Mariana Pajón	Cycling	Women's BMX	October 21
Gold	Juan Sebastián Cabal; Robert Farah	Tennis	Men's doubles	October 22
Gold	Robert Farah	Tennis	Men's singles	October 22
Gold	Óscar Figueroa	Weightlifting	Men's 62 kg	October 23
Gold	Jennifer Padilla	Athletics	Women's 400 metres	October 26
Gold	Princesa Oliveros	Athletics	Women's 400m hurdles	October 26
Gold	Jossimar Calvo	Gymnastics	Individual All-Round	October 26
Gold	Pedro Causil	Roller Skating	Men's 300 metres time-trial	October 26
Gold	Yersy Puello	Roller Skating	Women's 300 metres time-trial	October 26
Gold	Mercedes Pérez	Weightlifting	Women's 69kg	October 26
Gold	Ubaldina Valoyes	Weightlifting	Women's 75kg	October 26
Gold	Santiago Mejía	Bowling	Men's singles	October 27
Gold	Pedro Causil	Roller skating	Men's 1,000 metres	October 27
Gold	Yersy Puello	Roller skating	Women's 1,000 metres	October 27
Gold	Kelly Martinez	Roller skating	Women's 10,000 metres points and elimination	October 27
Gold	Caterine Ibargüen	Athletics	Women's Triple Jump	October 28
Gold	Andrés Rendón	Karate	Men's 60kg	October 28
Silver	Doris Patiño	Taekwondo	Women's 57 kg	October 16
Silver	Diana García, Juliana Gaviria	Cycling	Women's team sprint	October 17
Silver	Catalina Peláez; Silvia Angulo	Squash	Women's doubles	October 17
Silver	Fabián Puerta	Cycling	Men's individual sprint	October 19
Silver	Danilo Caro	Shooting	Men's trap	October 19
Silver	Cristian Mosquera	Wrestling	Men's Greco-Roman 84 kg	October 20
Silver	Silvia Angulo; Catalina Peláez; Anna Porras	Squash	Women's team	October 21
Silver	Omar Pinzón	Swimming	Men's 200 metre backstroke	October 21
Silver	Raul Angulo	Wrestling	Men's Greco-Roman 96 kg	October 21
Silver	James Rendón	Athletics	Men's 20 km walk	October 23
Silver	Maria Linares	Water skiing	Women's tricks	October 23
Silver	Sergio Rada	Weightlifting	Men's 56 kg	October 23
Silver	Jackelina Heredia	Weightlifting	Women's 58 kg	October 24
Silver	Nisida Palomeque	Weightlifting	Women's 63 kg	October 25
Silver	Carlos Andica	Weightlifting	Men's 85 kg	October 25
Silver	Jorge Hugo Giraldo	Gymnastics	Men's artistic individual all-around	October 26
Silver	Jorge Hugo Giraldo	Gymnastics	Men's pommel horse	October 27
Silver	Rosibel García	Athletics	Women's 1,500 metres	October 27
Silver	Yuri Alvear	Judo	Women's 70 kg	October 27
Silver	Jorge Hugo Giraldo	Gymnastics	Men's parallel bars	October 28
Silver	Jossimar Calvo	Gymnastics	Men's horizontal bar	October 28
Silver	Paulo Villar	Athletics	Men's 110 metres hurdles	October 28
Silver	Ángela Figueroa	Athletics	Women's 3,000 metres steeplechase	October 28
Silver	Ingrit Valencia	Boxing	Women's flyweight 51 kg	October 29
Silver	Diego Colorado	Athletics	Men's marathon	October 30
Bronze	Paula Medina, Luisa Zuluaga, Johana Araque	Table tennis	Women's team	October 16
Bronze	Team	Equestrian	Team dressage	October 16
Bronze	Jonathan Marín; Fabián Puerta; Christian Tamayo	Cycling	Men's team sprint	October 17
Bronze	Diana García	Cycling	Women's individual sprint	October 18
Bronze	María Luisa Calle; Sérika Gulumá; Lorena Vargas	Cycling	Women's team pursuit	October 18
Bronze	Juan López	Wrestling	Men's Greco-Roman 55 kg	October 20
Bronze	Victor Asprilla	Wrestling	Men's Greco-Roman 120 kg	October 20
Bronze	Andrés Jiménez	Cycling	Men's BMX	October 21
Bronze	Catalina Castaño; Mariana Duque Mariño	Tennis	Women's doubles	October 21
Bronze	Daniel Pineda	Archery	Men's individual	October 22
Bronze	Carolina Castillo	Wrestling	Women's freestyle 48 kg	October 22
Bronze	Sandra Roa	Wrestling	Women's freestyle 63 kg	October 22
Bronze	Luis Fernando López	Athletics	Men's 20 km walk	October 23
Bronze	Ingrid Hernández	Athletics	Women's 20 km walk	October 23
Bronze	Katherine Mercado	Weightlifting	Women's 48 kg	October 23
Bronze	Diego Salazar	Weightlifting	Men's 62 kg	October 23
Bronze	Yolanda Caballero	Athletics	Women's 10,000 metres	October 24
Bronze	Cesar Castillo; Jorge Hirsekorn	Racquetball	Men's team	October 24
Bronze	Leonardo Parrado	Roller skating	Men's free skating program	October 24
Bronze	Lina Rivas	Weightlifting	Women's 58 kg	October 24
Bronze	Doyler Sánchez	Weightlifting	Men's 69 kg	October 24
Bronze	Juan Martinez	Wrestling	Men's freestyle 96 kg	October 24
Bronze	Rosibel García	Athletics	Women's 800 metres	October 25
Bronze	Santiago Mejía; Andrés Gómez	Bowling	Men's pairs	October 25
Bronze	Anggie Ramírez; María Rodríguez	Bowling	Women's pairs	October 25
Bronze	Lina Flórez	Athletics	Women's 100 metres hurdles	October 26
Bronze	Caterine Ibargüen	Athletics	Women's long jump	October 26
Bronze	Isaia Mena	Boxing	Men's Super heavyweight +91 kg	October 26
Bronze	Catalina Escobar	Gymnastics	Women's vault	October 27
Bronze	Jorge Pena	Gymnastics	Men's pommel horse	October 27
Bronze	Norma González; Yomara Hinestroza; María Alejandra Idrobo; Darlenys Obregón; Eliecith Palacios; Lina Flórez; Jennifer Padilla	Athletics	Women's 4 × 100 metres relay	October 28
Bronze	Evelis Aguilar; Norma González; María Alejandra Idrobo; Princesa Oliveros; Jennifer Padilla	Athletics	Women's 4 × 400 metres relay	October 28
Bronze	Isaia Mena	Boxing	Men's Super heavyweight +91 kg	October 29
Bronze	Sebastián Villa	Diving	Men's 10 metre platform	October 29
Bronze	Juan Carlos Cardona	Athletics	Men's marathon	October 30

== Archery ==
Colombia has qualified a full men's and women's team of three athletes each.

Men

Athlete	Event	Ranking Round		Round of 32	Round of 16	Quarterfinals	Semifinals	Final
Athlete	Event	Score	Seed	Opposition Score	Opposition Score	Opposition Score	Opposition Score	Opposition Score
Daniel Pineda	Men's individual	1333	3	Mario Valdes (CHI); W 7 – 1	Hugo Franco (CUB); W 7 – 1	Juan Stevens (CUB); W 6 – 2	Crispin Duenas (CAN); L 4 – 6	Juan Serrano (MEX); W 7 – 1 (bronze)
Diego Torres	Men's individual	1262	17	Oscar Ticas (ESA); L 2 – 6	Did not advance			
Daniel Pacheco	Men's individual	1224	26	Jason Lyon (CAN); L 3 – 7	Did not advance			
Daniel Pacheco; Daniel Pineda; Diego Torres	Men's team	3819	6		Bye	Canada; L 210–211	Did not advance	5

Women

Athlete	Event	Ranking Round		Round of 32	Round of 16	Quarterfinals	Semifinals	Final	Rank
Athlete	Event	Score	Seed	Opposition Score	Opposition Score	Opposition Score	Opposition Score	Opposition Score	Rank
Paola Ramirez	Women's individual	1262	13	Orquidea Quesada (CUB); W 6 – 4	Khatuna Lorig (USA); W 6 – 5	Leidys Brito (VEN); L 2 – 6	Did not advance		5
María Echavarria	Women's individual	1190	29	Khatuna Lorig (USA); L 2 – 6	Did not advance				17
Valentina Contreras	Women's individual	1187	30	Aída Román (MEX); L 2 – 6	Did not advance				17
Valentina Contreras; María Echavarria; Paola Ramirez	Women's team	3639	9		Puerto Rico; W 212–194	Mexico; L 204–215	Did not advance		5

== Athletics ==
=== Track and road events ===
Event	Athletes	Heats		Semifinal		Final	
Event	Athletes	Time	Rank	Time	Rank	Time	Rank
100 m	Alvaro Gomez	10.31	2nd QS	10.40	3rd QF	10.33	7th
100 m	Montoya Isidro	10.60	4th	Did not advance			
200 m	Daniel Grueso	20.76 SB	2nd QS	20.83	4th	Did not advance	
400 m	Geiner Mosquera			46.97 SB	5th	Did not advance	
800 m	Rafhit Rodriguez			1:48.41	4th QF	1:58.27	9th
5000 m	Jose Mauricio Gonzalez					14:19.43	6th
5000 m	Javier Guarin					14:20.15	7th
10,000 m	Javier Guarin					DNF	
10,000 m	John Tello					31:04.32	8th
110 m hurdles	Paulo Villar			13.39 SB	2nd QF	13.27 PB	2nd place, silver medalist(s)
4 × 100 m relay	Isidro Montoya; Daniel Grueso; Alvaro Gomez; Geiner Mosquera			DNF		Did not advance	
Marathon	Juan Carlos Cardona					2:18:20	3rd place, bronze medalist(s)
Marathon	Diego Colorado					2:17:13 PB	2nd place, silver medalist(s)
20 km walk	Luis Fernando Lopez					1:22:51	3rd place, bronze medalist(s)
20 km walk	James Rendón					1:22:46 PB	2nd place, silver medalist(s)
50 km walk	Fredy Hernández					4:00:12	4th
50 km walk	Nestor Rueda					4:17:40	7th

=== Field events ===
Event	Athletes	Semifinal		Final	
Event	Athletes	Result	Rank	Result	Rank
High jump	Wanner Miller			2.18 m.	9th
Shot put	Eder Moreno			19.48 m. PB	5th
Javelin throw	Arley Ibargüen			72.93 m.	10th

=== Track and road events ===
Event	Athletes	Semifinal		Final	
Event	Athletes	Result	Rank	Result	Rank
100 m	Yomara Hinestoza	11.41	2nd Q	11.50	6th
100 m	Eliecith Palacios	11.77	4th	Did not advance	
200 m	Darlenys Obregón	23.50	3rd Q	23.64	8th
400 m	Norma Gonzalez	52.67	1st q	52.18	5th
400 m	Yenifer Padilla	51.76	1st Q	51.53	1st place, gold medalist(s)
800 m	Rosibel García			2:04.45	3rd place, bronze medalist(s)
1500 m	Rosibel García			4:26.78	2nd place, silver medalist(s)
5000 m	Yolanda Caballero			16:54.62	6th
10000 m	Yolanda Caballero			34:39.14 PB	3rd place, bronze medalist(s)
100 m hurdles	Lina Flores	13.26	3rd Q	13.09	3rd place, bronze medalist(s)
100 m hurdles	Brigitte Merlano	13.18	1st Q	13.10	4th
400 m hurdles	Maria Oliveros	57.55	1st Q	57.26	1st place, gold medalist(s)
3000 m steeplechase	Angela Figueroa			10:10.14	2nd place, silver medalist(s)
4 × 100 m relay	Lina Flores; Yenifer Padilla; Yomara Hinestoza; Norma Gonzalez			43.44 SB	3rd place, bronze medalist(s)
4 × 400 m relay	Maria Oliveros; Norma Gonzalez; Evelis Aguilar; Yenifer Padilla			3:29.94 NR	3rd place, bronze medalist(s)
Marathon	Yolanda Fernández			DNF	
20 km walk	Ingrid Hernández			1:34:06	3rd place, bronze medalist(s)
20 km walk	Arabelly Orjuela			1:36:50	6th

=== Field events ===
Event	Athletes	Final	
Event	Athletes	Result	Rank
Long jump	Caterine Ibargüen	6.63 m. PB	3rd place, bronze medalist(s)
Triple jump	Caterine Ibargüen	14.92 m. PR	1st place, gold medalist(s)
Shot put	Anyela Rivas	16.43 m.	6th
Hammer throw	Eli Moreno	59.23 m.	12th

== Basketball ==
Colombia has qualified a women's team.

Women

Team

- Myriam Alonso
- Elena Diaz
- Elisa Garcia
- Mabel Martinez
- Ana Sofia Mendoza
- Narlyn Mosquera
- Jenifer Munoz
- Sara Olarte
- Maria Palacio
- Katherine Quimbaya
- Leidy Sanchez
- Levys Torres

Standings

Pos	Team	Pld	W	L	PF	PA	PD	Pts	Qualification
1	Brazil	3	3	0	280	140	+140	6	Advance to Semifinals
2	Colombia	3	2	1	195	169	+26	5	Advance to Semifinals
3	Canada	3	1	2	206	166	+40	4	
4	Jamaica	3	0	3	89	295	−206	3	

Results

October 21
17:30

Report

Jamaica	26–83	Colombia
Scoring by quarter: 7–20, 5–14, 12–15, 2–34
Pts: Brown, 10; Rebs: Dixon, 8 Asts: 2 players, 2		Pts: Mosquera, 21; Rebs: 2 players, 6 Asts: Olarte, 5

CODE Dome, Guadalajara

October 22
13:00

Report

Canada	57–59	Colombia
Scoring by quarter: 9–9, 23–16, 9–15, 16–19
Pts: Tatham, 17; Rebs: Pinske, 11; Asts: 2 players, 4		Pts: Mosquera, 21; Rebs: Martinez, 7 Asts: 2 players, 3

CODE Dome, Guadalajara

October 23
10:30

Report

Colombia	53–86	Brazil
Scoring by quarter: 13–17, 14–25, 18–22, 8–22
Pts: Leidy Sanchez, 13; Rebs: 2 players, 7 Asts: 2 players, 2		Pts: Marques, 25; Rebs: De Souza, 13; Asts: 2 players, 4

CODE Dome, Guadalajara

Semifinals

October 24
20:00

Report

Mexico	64–58	Colombia
Scoring by quarter: 16–16, 21–10, 10–18, 17–14
Pts: 2 players, 15; Rebs: 2 players, 8 Asts: Gómez, 6		Pts: Martinez, 15; Rebs: 2 players, 5 Asts: Martinez, 5

CODE Dome, Guadalajara

Bronze medal Match

October 25
17:30

Report

Brazil	87–48	Colombia
Scoring by quarter: 24 – 11, 17 – 19, 28 – 11, 18 – 7
Pts: Marques, 20; Rebs: De Souza, 9 Asts: 4 players, 2		Pts: Sanchez, 12; Rebs: Palacio, 7 Asts: Mosquera, 4

CODE Dome, Guadalajara

2011 Pan American Games 4th

Colombia

== Beach volleyball ==
Colombia has qualified a women's team in the beach volleyball competition.

Athlete	Event	Preliminary round			Quarterfinals	Semifinals	Finals
Athlete	Event	Opposition Score	Opposition Score	Opposition Score	Opposition Score	Opposition Score	Opposition Score
Andrea Galindo; Claudia Galindo	Women	María Orellana (GUA); Anna Ramírez (GUA); W 21-19, 18-21, 15-10	Camila Pazdirk (CHI); Francisca Rivas (CHI); W 21-10, 21-7	Emily Day (USA); Heather Hughes (USA); L 19-21, 14-21	Bibiana Candelas (MEX); Mayra García (MEX); L 19-21, 14-21	Did not advance	

== Bowling ==
Colombia has qualified two male and two female bowlers in the individual and team competitions.

=== Men ===
Individual

Athlete	Event	Qualification															Eighth Finals	Quarterfinals	Semifinals	Finals
Athlete	Event	Block 1 (Games 1–6)						Block 2 (Games 7–12)						Total	Average		Eighth Finals	Quarterfinals	Semifinals	Finals
Athlete	Event	1	2	3	4	5	6	7	8	9	10	11	12	Total	Average	Opposition Scores	Opposition Scores	Opposition Scores	Opposition Scores	Rank
Andrés Gómez	Men's individual	190	237	213	234	211	268	204	266	233	202	229	173	2660	221.7	4th	Andraunik Simounet (PUR); W 612 – 587	Marcelo Suartz (BRA); L 668 – 682	Did not advance	
Santiago Mejía	Men's individual	236	223	243	228	214	249	208	243	156	193	210	198	2601	216.8	9th	Jose Lander (VEN); W 570 – 560	William O'Neill (USA); W 711 – 589	Marcelo Suartz (BRA); W 665 – 585	Chris Barnes (USA); W 394 – 364 (gold)

Pairs

Athlete	Event	Block 1 (Games 1–6)								Block 2 (Games 7–12)								Grand Total	Final Rank
Athlete	Event	1	2	3	4	5	6	Total	Average	7	8	9	10	11	12	Total	Average	Grand Total	Final Rank
Santiago Mejía; Andrés Gómez	Men's pairs	206	180	174	183	186	189	1118	186.4	204	213	178	182	238	201	2334	194.5	4856	3rd place, bronze medalist(s)
Santiago Mejía; Andrés Gómez	Men's pairs	201	224	212	237	227	181	1282	213.7	203	203	182	208	196	248	2522	210.2	4856	3rd place, bronze medalist(s)

=== Women ===
Individual

Athlete	Event	Qualification															Eighth Finals	Quarterfinals	Semifinals	Finals
Athlete	Event	Block 1 (Games 1–6)						Block 2 (Games 7–12)						Total	Average	Rank	Eighth Finals	Quarterfinals	Semifinals	Finals
Athlete	Event	1	2	3	4	5	6	7	8	9	10	11	12	Total	Average	Rank	Opposition Scores	Opposition Scores	Opposition Scores	Opposition Scores
Anggie Ramírez	Women's individual	180	167	224	200	198	208	160	170	199	221	185	177	2289	190.8	14th	Caroline Lagrange (CAN); L 608 – 619	Did not advance		
María Rodríguez	Women's individual	DNS															Did not advance			

Pairs

Athlete	Event	Block 1 (Games 1–6)								Block 2 (Games 7–12)								Grand Total	Final Rank
Athlete	Event	1	2	3	4	5	6	Total	Average	7	8	9	10	11	12	Total	Average	Grand Total	Final Rank
Anggie Ramírez; María Rodríguez	Women's pairs	196	232	203	186	269	148	1234	205.7	216	163	211	208	202	220	2454	204.5	4851	3rd place, bronze medalist(s)
Anggie Ramírez; María Rodríguez	Women's pairs	193	187	192	180	207	178	1137	189.5	215	180	227	215	192	231	2397	199.8	4851	3rd place, bronze medalist(s)

== Boxing ==
Colombia has qualified six athletes in the 49 kg, 52 kg, 56 kg, 60 kg, 75 kg, 91 kg and +91 kg men's categories; and two athletes in the 51 kg and 61 kg women's categories.

=== Men ===
Athlete	Event	Preliminaries	Quarterfinals	Semifinals	Final
Athlete	Event	Opposition Result	Opposition Result	Opposition Result	Opposition Result
Ceiver Avila	Light Flyweight		Joselito Velázquez (MEX); L 13 – 23	Did not advance	
Oscar Negrete	Flyweight	Braulio Ávila (MEX); L 9 – 16	Did not advance		
Deivis Neder Julio	Bantamweight		Robenilson De Jesus (BRA); L 4 – 15	Did not advance	
César Villarraga	Lightweight	Angel Suarez (PUR); L 16 – 19	Did not advance		
Deivis Julio	Heavyweight		Julio César Castillo (ECU); L 7 – 12	Did not advance	
Isaia Mena	Super Heavyweight		Danny Kelly (USA); W 13 – 11	Juan Hiracheta (MEX); L 13 – 19	Did not advance

=== Women ===
Athlete	Event	Quarterfinals	Semifinals	Final
Athlete	Event	Opposition Result	Opposition Result	Opposition Result
Ingrit Valencia	Flyweight	Christina Cruz (USA); W (4:4) 26 – 24	Karlha Magliocco (VEN); W 17 – 8	Mandy Bujold (CAN); L 5 – 11 (silver)
Jhennifer Caceres	Light Welterweight	Adela Peralta (ARG); L 13 – 22	Did not advance	

== Canoeing ==
=== Men ===
Athlete(s)	Event	Heats		Semifinals		Final	
Athlete(s)	Event	Time	Rank	Time	Rank	Time	Rank
Sergio Díaz	C-1 1000 m					4:25.805	5th
Carlos Escamilla	C-1 200 m	43.169	4th QSF	43.590	3rd QF	44.372	9th
Carlos Escamilla; Jesús Escamilla	C-2 1000 m					4:08.258	6th
Leocadio Pinto	K-1 1000 m					3:46.667	5th
Jimmy Urrego	K-1 200 m	38.881	5th QSF	38.686	3rd QF	39.305	9th
Yojan Cano; Leocadio Pinto	K-2 1000 m					3:28.988	6th
Jimmy Urrego; Victor Baron	K-2 200 m	34.836	4th QSF	36.386	2nd QF	34.801	9th
Jimmy Urrego; Victor Baron; Yojan Cano; Leocadio Pinto	K-4 1000 m					3:12.911	8th

=== Women ===
Athlete(s)	Event	Heats		Semifinals		Final	
Athlete(s)	Event	Time	Rank	Time	Rank	Time	Rank
Tatiana Muñoz	K-1 200 m	44.014	4th QSF	43.736	2nd QF	45.333	8th
Tatiana Muñoz	K-1 500 m	2:03.568	3rd QF			2:02.118	8th
Aura María Ospina; Ruth Niño	K-2 500 m	1:54.439	4th QSF	1:56.173	3rd QF	1:54.985	9th
Aura María Ospina; Ruth Niño; Tatiana Muñoz; Marilyn Rodríguez	K-4 500 m					1:43.441	7th

== Cycling ==
=== Road Cycling ===
==== Men ====
Athlete	Event	Time	Rank
Juan Esteban Arango	Road race	3:41:48	5th
Iván Casas	Road race	3:45:04	19th
Marlon Pérez Arango	Road race	DNF	
Weimar Roldán	Road race	3:45:14	25th
Iván Casas	Time trial	51:21.13	7th
Marlon Pérez Arango	Time trial	49:56.93	1st place, gold medalist(s)

==== Women ====
Athlete	Event	Time	Rank
María Luisa Calle	Road race	2:18:23	5th
Sérika Gulumá	Road race	2:18:29	24th
Luz Adriana Tovar	Road race	2:18:23	19th
María Luisa Calle	Time trial	28:04.82	1st place, gold medalist(s)
Luz Adriana Tovar	Time trial	28:49.69	8th

=== Track cycling ===
==== Sprints & Pursuit ====
Athlete	Event	Qualifying		Round of 16	1/8 finals (repechage)	Quarterfinals	Semifinals	Final
Athlete	Event	Time Speed (km/h)	Rank	Opposition Time Speed	Opposition Time Speed	Opposition Time Speed	Opposition Time Speed	Opposition Time Speed
Jonathan Marín	Men's sprint	10.092	6th	Jonathan Gatto (ARG); W 10.473		Fabián Puerta (COL); L 0-1		5th-8th places match: DNS; 8th
Fabián Puerta	Men's sprint	9.985	3rd	Leandro Bottasso (ARG); W 10.549		Jonathan Marín (COL); W 1-0	Ángel Pulgar (VEN); W 2-1	Hersony Canelón (VEN); L 0-2 (silver)
Jonathan Marín; Fabián Puerta; Christian Tamayo	Men's team sprint	45.112	3rd					Bronze medal match: Argentina; W 45.080 (bronze)
Juan Esteban Arango; Edwin Ávila; Arles Castro; Weimar Roldán	Men's team pursuit	4:00.126 PR	1st					Gold medal match: Chile; W OVL 3:59.236 PR (gold)
Diana García	Women's sprint	11.293	3rd			Luz Gaxiola (MEX); W 11.484	Lisandra Guerra (CUB); L 1-2	Bronze medal match: Juliana Gaviria (COL); W 2-0 (bronze)
Juliana Gaviria	Women's sprint	11.341	5th			Sumaia Ribeiro (BRA); W 11.850	Daniela Larreal (VEN); L 0-2	Bronze medal match: Diana García (COL); L 0-2
Diana García; Juliana Gaviria	Women's team sprint	34.375	2nd					Gold medal match: Venezuela; L 34.049 (silver)
María Luisa Calle; Sérika Gulumá; Lorena Vargas	Women's team pursuit	3:27.753	3rd					Bronze medal match: Venezuela; W 3:26.888 (bronze)

==== Keirin ====
Athlete	Event	1st round	Repechage	Final
Fabián Puerta	Men's keirin	2nd Q		1st place, gold medalist(s)
Diana García	Women's keirin			6th

==== Omnium ====
Athlete	Event	Flying Lap Time Rank	Points Race Points Rank	Elimination Race Rank	Ind Pursuit Time	Scratch Race Rank	Time Trial Time	Final Rank
Juan Esteban Arango	Men	13.069; 1st	18; 5th	2nd	4:23.864 PR; 1st	-1; 3rd	1:01.177; 1st	13 (gold)
Lorena Vargas	Women	15.170; 5th	26; 3rd	4th	3:47.282; 5th	0; 5th	37.888; 6th	28; 5th

=== Mountain Biking ===
Men

Athlete	Event	Time	Rank
Héctor Leonardo Páez	Cross-country	1:31:12	1st place, gold medalist(s)
Mario Rojas	Cross-country	1:34:21	4th

Women

Athlete	Event	Time	Rank
Laura Abril	Cross-country	1:44:55	11th

=== Cycling BMX ===
Colombia has qualified Mariana Pajón Londoño (UCI World Champion 2011) and other Riders.

Athlete	Event	Qualifying Run 1		Qualifying Run 2		Qualifying Run 3		Qualifying	Semifinal		Final	
Athlete	Event	Time	Points	Time	Points	Time	Points	Points	Points	Rank	Time	Rank
Andrés Jiménez	Men	35.837	1	35.681	1	35.793	2	4 Q	33.559	1st Q	35.323	3rd place, bronze medalist(s)
Carlos Oquendo	Men	36.303	2	36.421	2	35.325	1	5 Q	35.047	3rd Q	36.765	7th
Mariana Pajón	Women	42.321	1	42.909	1	43.018	1	3 Q			40.118	1st place, gold medalist(s)
Andrea Zuluaga	Women	45.441	2	46.423	2	45.969	2	6 Q			49.098	7th

== Diving ==
=== Men ===
Athlete(s)	Event	Preliminary		Final	
Athlete(s)	Event	Points	Rank	Points	Rank
Sebastián Villa	3 m springboard	449.05	3rd Q	458.70	4th
Sebastián Villa	10 m platform	408.50	8th Q	471.05	3rd place, bronze medalist(s)
Víctor Ortega	10 m platform	423.85	6th Q	395.30	8th
Sebastián Villa; Víctor Ortega	3 m synchronized springboard			375.03	5th
Víctor Ortega; Juan Guillermo Rios	10 m synchronized platform			385.68	5th

=== Women ===
Athlete(s)	Event	Preliminary		Final	
Athlete(s)	Event	Points	Rank	Points	Rank
Carolina Murillo	3 m springboard	242.30	9th Q	239.65	11th
Dian Pineda	3 m springboard	256.25	8th Q	275.80	8th
Carolina Murillo	10 m platform	253.80	9th Q	262.55	8th

== Equestrian ==
=== Dressage ===
Athlete	Horse	Event	Grand Prix		Grand Prix Special		Grand Prix Freestyle		Final Score	Rank
Athlete	Horse	Event	Score	Rank	Score	Rank	Score	Rank	Final Score	Rank
Constanza Jaramillo	Wakana	Individual	72.158	3rd Q	71.211	7th Q	73.530	8th	73.530	8th
Marco Bernal	Farewell	Individual	70.237	9th Q	71.105	8th Q	71.553	10th	71.553	10th
Maria Ines Garcia	Beckam	Individual	66.447	21st Q	Did not advance					
Juan Mauricio Sanchez	First Fisherman	Individual	65.500	24th Q	64.026	22nd	Did not advance			
Constanza Jaramillo; Marco Bernal; Maria Ines Garcia; Juan Mauricio Sanchez	Wakana; Farewell; Beckam; First Fisherman	Team	69.614	3rd					69.614	3rd place, bronze medalist(s)

=== Eventing ===
Athlete	Horse	Event	Dressage		Cross-country		Jumping				Total	
Athlete	Horse	Event	Dressage		Cross-country		Qualifier		Final		Total	
Athlete	Horse	Event	Penalties	Rank	Penalties	Rank	Penalties	Rank	Penalties	Rank	Penalties	Rank
Juan Carlos Tafur	Quinnto	Individual	68.20	43rd	Did not advance							
Wilson Zarabanda	Victoriosa	Individual	69.30	44th	Did not advance							
Mauricio Bermudez	Nankin	Individual	73.50	46th Q	83.20	31st Q	12.00	29th Q	Did not advance			
Alexander Lopez	Nilo	Individual	74.30	47th	Did not advance							
Juan Carlos Tafur; Wilson Zarabanda; Mauricio Bermudez; Alexander Lopez	Quinnto; Victoriosa; Nankin; Nilo	Team	211.00	10th	1985.70	10th	12.00	10th			2208.70	10th

=== Individual jumping ===
Athlete	Horse	Event	Ind. 1st Qualifier		Ind. 2nd Qualifier			Ind. 3rd Qualifier			Ind. Final					
Athlete	Horse	Event	Ind. 1st Qualifier		Ind. 2nd Qualifier			Ind. 3rd Qualifier			Round A		Round B		Total	
Athlete	Horse	Event	Penalties	Rank	Penalties	Total	Rank	Penalties	Total	Rank	Penalties	Rank	Penalties	Rank	Penalties	Rank
Rodrigo Diaz	Celesta	Individual	5.02	19th	20.00	25.02	45th	4.00	29.02	38th	Did not advance					
John Perez	Utopia	Individual	5.54	23rd	4.00	9.54	19th	8.00	17.54	25th	1.00	16th	13.00	17th	31.54	17th
Daniel Bluman	Sancha LS	Individual	5.63	24th	4.00	9.63	20th	0.00	9.63	13th	0.00	8th	4.00	7th	13.63	7th
Roberto Teran	Denver	Individual	5.82	26th	24.00	29.82	47th	8.00	37.82	46th	Did not advance					

=== Team jumping ===
Athlete	Horse	Event	Qualification Round		Final					
Athlete	Horse	Event	Qualification Round		Round 1		Round 2		Total	
Athlete	Horse	Event	Penalties	Rank	Penalties	Rank	Penalties	Rank	Penalties	Rank
Rodrigo Diaz; John Perez; Daniel Bluman; Roberto Teran	Celesta; Utopia; Sancha LS; Denver	Team	16.19	8th	28.00	8th	12.00	7th	56.19	7th

== Fencing ==
Colombia has qualified a men's team in the épée competition and one athlete each in the sabre competitions.

=== Men ===
Event	Athlete	Round of Poules		Round of 16	Quarterfinals	Semifinals	Final
Event	Athlete	Result	Seed	Opposition Score	Opposition Score	Opposition Score	Opposition Score
Individual épée	Andrés Campos	3 V – 2 D	7th Q	Tigran Bajgoric (CAN); L 11 – 15	Did not advance		
Individual épée	Jhon Rodriguez	3 V – 2 D	10th Q	Reynier Henriquez (CUB); L 3 – 14	Did not advance		
Individual sabre	Carlos Valencia	0 V – 5 D	16th	Alexander Achten (ARG); L 8 – 15	Did not advance		
Team épée	Andrés Campos; Jhon Rodriguez; Gustavo Coqueco				Chile; L 38 – 40	5th-8th place match: El Salvador; W 45 – 38	5th-6th place match: Cuba; L 34 – 45; 6th

== Football ==
Colombia has qualified a women's team in the football competition.

=== Women ===
==== Squad ====
- Lady Andrade
- Carolina Arias
- Katherine Arias
- Katerin Castro
- Julieth Dominguez
- Angelica Hernandez
- Fatima Montano
- Daniela Montoya
- Diana Ospina
- Kelis Peduzini
- Catalina Perez
- Hazleydi Rincon
- Carmen Rodallega
- Kena Romero
- Jessica Sánchez
- Gavy Santos
- Sandra Sepúlveda
- Maria Usme

==== Standings ====
Pos	Team	Pld	W	D	L	GF	GA	GD	Pts	Qualification
1	Colombia	3	2	0	1	2	1	+1	6	Advance to Semifinals
2	Mexico	3	1	2	0	2	1	+1	5	Advance to Semifinals
3	Chile	3	1	1	1	3	1	+2	4	
4	Trinidad and Tobago	3	0	1	2	1	5	−4	1	

==== Results ====
October 18, 2011
14:00

Colombia	1 – 0	Trinidad and Tobago
Andrade 19'	Report

Estadio Omnilife, Guadalajara
Referee: Jessica Di Orio (Argentina)

October 20, 2011
14:00

Chile	0 – 1	Colombia
	Report	Rincón 3'

Estadio Omnilife, Guadalajara
Referee: Lucila Venegas (Mexico)

October 22, 2011
17:00

Mexico	1 – 0	Colombia
Pérez 1'	Report

Estadio Omnilife, Guadalajara
Referee: Yesli Rivas (El Salvador)

==== Semifinals ====
October 25, 2011
20:00

Colombia	1 – 2	Canada
Usme 81'	Report	Kyle 47'; Gayle 88'

Estadio Omnilife, Guadalajara
Referee: Jessica Di Orio (Argentina)

==== Bronze medal match ====
October 27, 2011
14:00

Mexico	1 – 0 (a.e.t.)	Colombia
Ruiz 100'	Report

Estadio Omnilife, Guadalajara
Referee: Yesli Rivas (El Salvador)

== Gymnastics ==
=== Artistic ===
Colombia has qualified a full team of six male and six female athletes in the artistic gymnastics competition.

One of the artistic gymnasts is Yurany Avendaño who competed at the world championships artistic gymnastics 2010 in Rotterdam, The Netherlands. She is known as one of the better gymnasts in Colombia on the bars apparatus.

Men

Individual qualification & Team Finals

Athlete	Event	Apparatus						Qualification		Final	
Athlete	Event	Floor	Pommel horse	Rings	Vault	Parallel bars	Horizontal bar	Total	Rank	Total	Rank
Jossimar Calvo	Ind Qualification	14.800	13.150	12.450	15.650	14.500	14.800	85.350	6th		
Jorge Giraldo	Ind Qualification	13.850	13.950	14.300	15.400	14.900	14.150	86.550	2nd		
James Brochero	Ind Qualification	14.100		13.000	15.750	13.950		56.800	40th		
Fabian Meza	Ind Qualification		13.700	13.650		14.050	13.950	55.350	42nd		
Jorge Peña	Ind Qualification	13.350	14.400		14.950			42.700	50th		
Javier Sandoval	Ind Qualification	13.050	12.550	12.700	15.300	13.700	13.500	80.800	19th		
Team Totals; Four Best Scores	Team All-around	56.100	55.200	53.650	62.100	57.400	56.400			340.850	4th

Individual Finals

Athlete	Event	Final							
Athlete	Event	Floor	Pommel horse	Rings	Vault	Parallel bars	Horizontal bar	Total	Rank
Jossimar Calvo	Individual All-around	15.000	13.900	13.200	15.550	14.600	14.150	86.400	1st place, gold medalist(s)
Jossimar Calvo	Individual Floor	14.350						14.350	5th
Jossimar Calvo	Individual Parallel Bars					13.600		13.600	7th
Jossimar Calvo	Individual Horizontal Bar						14.825	14.825	2nd place, silver medalist(s)
Jorge Giraldo	Individual All-around	13.350	14.050	14.700	15.500	14.250	14.350	86.200	2nd place, silver medalist(s)
Jorge Giraldo	Individual Pommel Horse		14.625					14.625	2nd place, silver medalist(s)
Jorge Giraldo	Individual Parallel Bars					14.825		14.825	2nd place, silver medalist(s)
Jorge Giraldo	Individual Horizontal Bar						14.300	14.300	4th
Jorge Peña	Individual Pommel Horse		14.450					14.450	3rd place, bronze medalist(s)

Women
Individual qualification & Team Finals

Athlete	Event	Apparatus				Qualification		Final	
Athlete	Event	Vault	Uneven bars	Balance Beam	Floor	Total	Rank	Total	Rank
Yurany Avendaño	Ind Qualification		13.200	12.350		25.550	51st		
Catalina Escobar	Ind Qualification	15.075	11.800	12.400	13.075	52.350	17th		
Jessica Gil	Ind Qualification	14.075	12.400	13.600	12.800	52.875	10th		
Gabriela Gomez	Ind Qualification	12.800		10.600	12.275	35.675	49th		
Nathalia Sánchez	Ind Qualification	12.425	13.250	12.900	11.825	50.400	24th		
Bibiana Velez	Ind Qualification	13.675	13.600		12.500	39.775	44th		
Team Totals; Four Best Scores	Team All-around	55.625	52.450	52.250	50.650			209.975	4th

Individual Finals

Athlete	Event	Apparatus				Final	
Athlete	Event	Vault	Uneven bars	Balance Beam	Floor	Total	Rank
Catalina Escobar	Individual All-around	14.750	12.500	12.700	13.000	52.950	8th
Catalina Escobar	Individual Vault	14.162				14.162	3rd place, bronze medalist(s)
Jessica Gil	Individual All-around	14.175	12.075	13.500	12.900	52.650	9th
Jessica Gil	Individual Vault	13.887				13.887	5th
Jessica Gil	Individual Balance Beam			11.800		11.800	8th
Nathalia Sánchez	Individual Uneven Bars		12.250			12.250	7th
Bibiana Velez	Individual Uneven Bars		12.150			12.150	8th

=== Rhythmic ===
Colombia has qualified one athlete in the individual rhythmic gymnastics competition.

All Around

Athlete	Event	Final					
Athlete	Event	Hoop	Rope	Clubs	Ribbon	Total	Rank
Carolina Velez	Individual	21.275	20.150	20.150	20.050	81.625	14th

== Judo ==
Colombia has qualified five athletes in the 60 kg, 73 kg, 90 kg, 100 kg, and 100+kg men's categories and six athletes in the 48 kg, 52 kg, 57 kg, 63 kg, 70 kg, and 78 kg women's categories.

Men

Athlete	Event	Round of 16	Quarterfinals	Semifinals	Final
Athlete	Event	Opposition Result	Opposition Result	Opposition Result	Opposition Result
Jhon Futtinico	−60 kg	Nabor Castillo (MEX); L 000 S1 – 010	Did not advance (to repechage round)		
Derian Castro	−73 kg	Michael Eldred (USA); L 000 – 110 S1	Did not advance		
Oscar Ladino	−90 kg	Rafael F. Romo (CHI); L 000 – 100	Did not advance		
Camilo Castaño	−100 kg	Oreydi Despaigne (CUB); L 000 S1 – 120	Did not advance (to repechage round)		
Luis Ignasio Salazar	+100 kg	Darrel Castillo (GUA); W 100 – 000 S1	Carlos Erick Zegarra (PER); W 001 S1 – 000 S2	Óscar Brayson (CUB); W 000 – 100	Did not advance (to repechage round)

Repechage Rounds

Athlete	Event	Repechage 8	Repechage Final	Bronze Final
Athlete	Event	Opposition Result	Opposition Result	Opposition Result
Jhon Futtinico	−60 kg	Frazer Will (CAN); L 011 – 100 S2	Did not advance	
Camilo Castaño	−100 kg	Stefan Zwiers (CAN); W 011 S2 – 001 S3	Diego Ochoa (ESA); L 000 – 100 S1	Did not advance
Luis Ignasio Salazar	+100 kg			Anthony Turner Jr. (USA); L 000 S3 – 010 S1

Women

Athlete	Event	Round of 16	Quarterfinals	Semifinals	Final
Athlete	Event	Opposition Result	Opposition Result	Opposition Result	Opposition Result
Luz Adiela Alvarez	−48 kg	Paula Pareto (ARG); L 000 S2 – 002	Did not advance (to repechage round)		
Yulieth Sánchez	−52 kg	Angelica Delgado (USA); L 000 S2 – 001 S1	Did not advance (to repechage round)		
Yadinis Amarís	−57 kg		Diana Villavicencio (ECU); W 110 – 002 S1	Rafaela Silva (BRA); L 000 S3 – 011	Did not advance (to repechage round)
Diana Velasco	−63 kg	Yennifer Dominguez (GUA); W 102 – 000 S2	Ysis Barreto (VEN); W 003 – 000 S2	Yaritza Abel (CUB); L 000 – 100	Did not advance (to repechage round)
Yuri Alvear	−70 kg		Maria Perez (PUR); W 121 – 000 S2	Maria Mazzoleni (BRA); W 100 – 000 S1	Onix Cortés (CUB); L 000 S1 – 001 S1 (silver)
Anny Cortes	−70 kg		Catherine Roberge (CAN); L 000 S4 – 100	Did not advance (to repechage round)	

Repechage Rounds

Athlete	Event	Repechage 8	Repechage Final	Bronze Final
Athlete	Event	Opposition Result	Opposition Result	Opposition Result
Luz Adiela Alvarez	−48 kg	Lesly Cano (PER); W 120 S1 – 000 S3	A. Galleguillos (CHI); W 100 – 000	Sarah Menezes (BRA); L 000 S1 – 101 S1
Yulieth Sánchez	−52 kg	Linouse Desravine (HAI); W 100 – 000	Leslie Huaman (PER); W Fusen-Gachi	Oritia González (ARG); W GS 100 S1 – 010 S4 (bronze)
Yadinis Amarís	−57 kg			Hanna Carmichael (USA); L 000 S1 – 010 S1
Diana Velasco	−63 kg			Christal Ransom (USA); L Hantei
Anny Cortes	−70 kg		Mirla Nolberto (GUA); W 120 – 000 S3	Yslennis Castillo (CUB); L 000 S4 – 100

== Karate ==
Colombia has qualified two athletes in the 60 kg, and 84 kg men's categories, and one athlete in the 50 kg women's categories.

Athlete	Event	Round robin (Pool A/B)			Semifinals	Final
Athlete	Event	Match 1	Match 2	Match 3	Semifinals	Final
Athlete	Event	Opposition Result	Opposition Result	Opposition Result	Opposition Result	Opposition Result
Andrés Rendón	Men's -60 kg	Miguel Soffia (CHI); W PTS 5:0	Adam Brozzer (USA); W PTS 5:0	David Perez G. (ESA); W KIK 0:0	Douglas Brose (BRA); W PTS 2:1	Norberto Sosa (DOM); W PTS 8:0 (gold)
Yilber Ocoro	Men's -84 kg	Homero Morales (MEX); L PTS 1:3	Pablo Layerla (URU); L PTS 1:4	Sorin Alexandru (CAN); HWK 0:0	Did not advance	
Paula Ruiz	Women's -50 kg	Jessica Candido (BRA); L PTS 0:5	Gabriela Bruna (CHI); L PTS 0:2	Tyler Wolfe (CAN); HWK 1:1	Did not advance	

== Racquetball ==
Colombia has qualified four male and one female athletes in the racquetball competitions.

Men

Athlete	Event	Preliminary round (2 or 3)	Round of 16	Quarterfinals	Semifinals	Final
Athlete	Event	Opposition Score	Opposition Score	Opposition Score	Opposition Score	Opposition Score
Alejandro Herrera	Singles	Cesar Castillo (VEN); L 15 – 8, 6 – 15, 6 – 11; Álvaro Beltrán (MEX); L 3 – 15, 5 – 15; Raul Banegas (HON); W 15 – 11, 15 – 11	Ro Carson III (USA); L 11 – 15, 6 – 15	Did not advance		
Juan S. Herrera	Singles	César Castro (VEN); L 5 – 15, 8 – 15; Ramon De Leon (DOM); W 15 – 7,15 – 3 Vincent Gagnon (CAN); W 6 – 15, 15 – 5, 11 – 9	Ricardo Monroy (BOL); W 15 – 13, 15 – 7	Gilberto Mejia (MEX); L 10 – 15, 8 – 15	Did not advance	
Francisco J. Gomez; Juan Torres	Doubles	Felipe Camacho (Costa Rica) Teobaldo Fumero (CRC); L 13 – 15, 9 – 15; Roland Keller (Bolivia) Ricardo Monroy (BOL); W 15 – 7, 6 – 15, 11 – 3 Christopher Crowther (United States) Shane Vanderson (USA); L 4 – 15, 9 – 15	Luis Perez (Dominican Republic) Ramon De Leon (DOM); W 10 – 15, 15 – 2, 11 – 6	Javier Moreno (Mexico) Álvaro Beltrán (MEX); L 15 – 4, 15 – 7	Did not advance	
Francisco J. Gomez; Juan Torres; Juan S. Herrera; Alejandro Herrera	Team			Venezuela; W 2 – 0, 1 – 0, 0 – 2	Mexico; L 0 – 2, 0 – 2 (bronze)	Did not advance

Women

Athlete	Event	Preliminary round (2 or 3)	Round of 16	Quarterfinals	Semifinals	Final
Athlete	Event	Opposition Score	Opposition Score	Opposition Score	Opposition Score	Opposition Score
Cristina Amaya	Singles	Federique Lambert (CAN); L 6 – 15, 14 – 15; Samantha Salas (MEX); L 3 – 15, 11 – 15; Mariana Tobon (VEN); W 9 – 15, 15 – 2, 11 – 9	Cheryl Gudinas (USA); L 12 – 15, 6 – 15	Did not advance		

== Roller skating ==
Colombia has qualified a men's and women's team in the roller skating competition.

Men

Athlete	Event	Qualification		Final	
Athlete	Event	Result	Rank	Result	Rank
Pedro Causil	300 m time trial			24.802	1st place, gold medalist(s)
Pedro Causil	1,000 m	1:29.008	1st Q	1:25.941	1st place, gold medalist(s)
Jorge Cifuentes	10,000 m			EL	8th

Artistic

Athlete	Event	Short Program		Long Program	
Athlete	Event	Result	Rank	Result	Rank
Leonardo Parrado	Free skating	118.60	3rd	124.80	3rd place, bronze medalist(s)

Women

Athlete	Event	Qualification		Final	
Athlete	Event	Result	Rank	Result	Rank
Yersy Puello	300 m time trial			26.444	1st place, gold medalist(s)
Yersy Puello	1,000 m	1:38.260	1st Q	1:35.056	1st place, gold medalist(s)
Kelly Martínez	10,000 m			30	1st place, gold medalist(s)

Artistic

Athlete	Event	Short Program		Long Program	
Athlete	Event	Result	Rank	Result	Rank
Nataly Otarola	Free skating	118.30	3rd	121.20	4th

== Rowing ==
Men

Athlete(s)	Event	Heat		Repechage		Final	
Athlete(s)	Event	Time	Rank	Time	Rank	Time	Rank
Rodrigo Ideus	Single Sculls	8:09.23	6th R	7:51.95	5th qB	7:28.79	5th

== Sailing ==
Colombia has qualified four boats and five athletes in the sailing competition.

Men

Athlete	Event	Race											Net Points	Final Rank
Athlete	Event	1	2	3	4	5	6	7	8	9	10	M	Net Points	Final Rank
Santiago Grillo	Windsurfer (RS:X)	5	6	3	4	5	(7)	3	5	6	4	8	49.0	
Andrey Quintero	Single-handed Dinghy (Laser)	8	11	4	11	7	3	7	(13)	10	9	/	70.0	9th

Open

Athlete	Event	Race											Net Points	Final Rank
Athlete	Event	1	2	3	4	5	6	7	8	9	10	M	Net Points	Final Rank
Dany Delgado; Andrea Ponton	Double-handed Dinghy (Snipe)	(10)	9	10	8	8	7	10	8	9	10	/	79.0	10th
Antonio Rojas	Single-handed Dinghy (Sunfish)	4	9	10	5	9	2	(13); DSQ	8	4	7	/	58.0	7th

== Shooting ==
Men

Event	Athlete	Qualification		Final	
Event	Athlete	Score	Rank	Score	Rank
10 m air pistol	Alex Peralta	576-20x	3rd Q	669.3	8th
50 m pistol	Alex Peralta	534- 5x	14th	Did not advance	
50 m rifle prone	David D'Achiardi	566-18x	26th	Did not advance	
50 m rifle prone	Cesar Tobon	579-23x	16th	Did not advance	
Double Trap	Danilo Caro	131	7th	Did not advance	
Trap	Danilo Caro	123	2nd Q	145	2nd place, silver medalist(s)
Skeet	Diego Duarte	118	9th	Did not advance	

Women

Event	Athlete	Qualification		Final	
Event	Athlete	Score	Rank	Score	Rank
10 m air pistol	Amanda Mondol	368- 6x	15th	Did not advance	
10 m air pistol	Adriana Rendon	374- 5x	4th Q	473.4	4th
25 m pistol	Amanda Mondol	562-11x	9th	Did not advance	
25 m pistol	Adriana Rendon	547-11x	18th	Did not advance	

== Squash ==
Colombia has qualified three male and three female athletes in the individual and team competitions.

Men

Athlete(s)	Event	First round	Round of 16	Quarterfinal	Semifinal	Final
Athlete(s)	Event	Opposition Result	Opposition Result	Opposition Result	Opposition Result	Opposition Result
Andrés Vargas	Singles	Esteban Casarino (PAR); L 6-11, 8-11, 11–7, 4-11	Did not advance			
Miguel Ángel Rodríguez	Singles		Hernán D'Arcangelo (ARG); W 11–7, 11–7, 11–9	Gonzalo Miranda (ARG); W 15–13, 11–2, 11–2	Shawn Delierre (CAN); W 11-7, 11-3, 11-7	César Salazar (MEX); W 11-7, 11-9, 11-4 (gold)
Andrés Vargas; Javier Castilla	Doubles			Esteban Casarino (PAR); Nicolas Caballero (PAR); L 9-11, 11–4, 10-11	Did not advance	

Athletes	Event	Preliminaries Group stage			Quarterfinal	Semifinal	Final
Athletes	Event	Opposition Result	Opposition Result	Opposition Result	Opposition Result	Opposition Result	Opposition Result
Andrés Vargas; Javier Castilla; Miguel Ángel Rodríguez	Team	Canada; L 1-3, 0-3, 1-3	Chile; W 3-0, 3-1, 3-1	Guatemala; W 3-0, 3-0, 3-0	Brazil; L 3-1, 1-3, 1-3	Did not advance	

Women

Athlete(s)	Event	First round	Round of 16	Quarterfinal	Semifinal	Final
Athlete(s)	Event	Opposition Result	Opposition Result	Opposition Result	Opposition Result	Opposition Result
Catalina Peláez	Singles		Pamela Anckerman (GUA); W 11–7, 11–3, 11–4	Samantha Terán (MEX); L 7-11, 7-11, 8-11	Did not advance	
Silvia Angulo	Singles		Ana Pinto (CHI); W 11–4, 11–7, 12–10	Miranda Ranieri (CAN); L 10–12, 5–11, 11–4, 11–4, 15–17	Did not advance	
Catalina Peláez; Silvia Angulo	Doubles			Sandra Pinto (CHI); Ana Pinto (CHI); W 11–4, 11–3	Miranda Ranieri (CAN); Stephanie Edmison (CAN); W 11–7, 8-11, 11–7	Nayelly Hernández (MEX); Samantha Terán (MEX); L 8-11, 5-11 (silver)

Athletes	Event	Preliminaries Group stage			Semifinal	Final
Athletes	Event	Opposition Result	Opposition Result	Opposition Result	Opposition Result	Opposition Result
Catalina Peláez; Silvia Angulo; Anna Porras	Team	Canada; L 0-3, 1-3, 2-3	Chile; W 3-0, 3-1, 3-0	Guatemala; W 3-0, 3-0, 3-0	United States; W 0-3, 3-1, 3-0	Canada; L 1-3, 1-3 (silver)

== Swimming ==
Men

Event	Athletes	Heats		Final	
Event	Athletes	Time	Position	Time	Position
200 m Freestyle	Mateo de Angulo	1:54.55	14th qB	1:53.72	5th B
1500 m Freestyle	Mateo de Angulo	16:10.45	11th	Did not advance	
100 m Backstroke	Omar Pinzón	56.82	7th	DNS	
200 m Backstroke	Omar Pinzón	2:01.14	1st Q	1:58.31	2nd place, silver medalist(s)
100 m Breaststroke	Jorge Murillo	1:03.25	8th Q	1:03.11	7th
200 m Breaststroke	Jorge Murillo	2:16.06	3rd Q	2:18.13	6th
100 m Butterfly	Omar Pinzón	53.76	3rd Q	53.17	5th
200 m Butterfly	Omar Pinzón	2:01.02	4th Q	2:01.36	4th

Women

Event	Athletes	Heats		Final	
Event	Athletes	Time	Position	Time	Position
50 m Freestyle	Carolina Colorado Henao	26.64	10th qB	26.65	4th
100 m Backstroke	Isabella Arcila	1:04.30	8th Q	1:03.80	8th
100 m Backstroke	Carolina Colorado Henao	1:03.22	7th Q	1:02.83	5th
100 m Breaststroke	Monica Alvarez	1:13.36	13th qB	1:12.25	2nd B
100 m butterfly	Carolina Colorado Henao	1:01.06	4th Q	1:01.11	6th

== Synchronized swimming ==
Colombia has qualified a team and a duet in the synchronized swimming competition.

Athlete	Event	Technical Routine		Free Routine (Final)			
Athlete	Event	Points	Rank	Points	Rank	Total Points	Rank
Estefanía Álvarez; Jennifer Cerquera	Women's duet	81.000	5th	80.350	5th	161.350	5th
Estefanía Álvarez; Jennifer Cerquera; Juliana Arbelaez; Paula Arcila; Ingrid Cubillos; Zully Perez; Sara Rodríguez; Sara Roldan; Isabela Cuevas	Women's team	79.750	5th	80.263	5th	160.013	5th

== Table tennis ==
Colombia has qualified one male in the individual competition and three female athletes in the individual and team competitions.

Men

Athlete	Event	Round robin			1st round	Eighthfinals	Quarterfinals	Semifinals	Final
Athlete	Event	Match 1	Match 2	Match 3	1st round	Eighthfinals	Quarterfinals	Semifinals	Final
Athlete	Event	Opposition Result	Opposition Result	Opposition Result	Opposition Result	Opposition Result	Opposition Result	Opposition Result	Opposition Result
Alexander Echavarria	Singles	Gustavo Tsuboi (BRA); L 1 – 4	Dino Suarez (ECU); W 4 – 3	Henry Mujica (VEN); W 4 – 3	Guillermo Munoz (MEX); W 4 – 0	Ju Lin (DOM); L 1 – 4	Did not advance		

Women

Athlete	Event	Round robin			1st round	Eighthfinals	Quarterfinals	Semifinals	Final
Athlete	Event	Match 1	Match 2	Match 3	1st round	Eighthfinals	Quarterfinals	Semifinals	Final
Athlete	Event	Opposition Result	Opposition Result	Opposition Result	Opposition Result	Opposition Result	Opposition Result	Opposition Result	Opposition Result
Johana Araque	Singles	Judith Morales (CHI); W 4 – 2	Fabiola Ramos (VEN); L 0 – 4	Angela Mori (PER); W 4 – 0		Lígia Silva (BRA); L 0 – 4	Did not advance		
Paula Medina	Singles	Eva Brito (DOM); W 4 – 0	Berta Rodríguez (CHI); W 4 – 0	Sandra Orellana (ESA); W 4 – 0		Paulina Vega (CHI); L 0 – 4	Did not advance		
Luisa Zuluga	Singles	Lígia Silva (BRA); L 0 – 4	Mabelyn Enriquez (GUA); W 4 – 2	Anqi Luo (CAN); W 4 – 3		Did not advance			
Paula Medina; Johana Araque; Luisa Zuluga	Team	El Salvador; W 1 – 3, 3 – 0, 3 – 1, 3 – 0	Venezuela; L 2 – 3, 3 – 0, 1 – 3, 0 – 3				Brazil; W 3 – 0, 2 – 3, 3 – 2, 3 – 2	Venezuela; L 0 – 3, 1 – 3, 3 – 1, 0 – 3 (bronze)	Did not advance

== Taekwondo ==
Colombia has qualified three athletes in the 58 kg, 80 kg, and 80+kg men's categories and four athletes in the 49 kg, 57 kg, 67 kg, and 67+kg women's categories.

Men

Athlete	Event	Round of 16	Quarterfinals	Semifinals	Final
Athlete	Event	Opposition Result	Opposition Result	Opposition Result	Opposition Result
Óscar Muñoz	Flyweight (-58kg)	Mario Leal (VEN); W 7 – 1	Frank Diaz (CUB); L RSC Ronda 3 1:15	Did not advance	
Yair Medina	Middleweight (-80kg)	Uriel Adriano (MEX); L 5 – 6	Did not advance		
Carlos Alejandro Cañas	Heavyweight(+80kg)	Stephen Lambdin (USA); L 5 – 6	Did not advance		

Women

Athlete	Event	Round of 16	Quarterfinals	Semifinals	Final
Athlete	Event	Opposition Result	Opposition Result	Opposition Result	Opposition Result
Monica Olarte	Flyweight (-49kg)	Andrea Erazo (HON); W 5 – 2	Lizbeth Diez-Canseco (PER); L 6 – 11	Did not advance	
Doris Patiño	Lightweight (-57kg)		Emely Cartagena (PUR); W 3 – 2	Yeny Contreras (CHI); W 6 – 5	Irma Contreras (MEX); L 3 – 4 (silver)
Katherine Dumar	Middleweight (-67kg)	Veronica Tajes (ARG); W 11 – 0	Paige McPherson (USA); L 2 – 16	Did not advance	
Sandra Vanegas	Heavyweight(+67kg)	Jasmyne Vokey (CAN); W 5 – 2	Guadalipe Ruiz (MEX); L 5 – 6	Did not advance	

== Triathlon ==
=== Men ===
Athlete	Event	Swim (1.5 km)	Trans 1	Bike (40 km)	Trans 2	Run (10 km)	Total	Rank
Oscar Preciado	Individual	18:39; 20th	0:28; 34th	57:34; 25th	0:20; 30th	39:38; 26th	1:56:41	24th
Carlos Quinchara	Individual	18:25; 14th	0:26; 25th	57:15; 14th	0:18; 26th	35:00; 13th	1:51:26	12th

=== Women ===
Athlete	Event	Swim (1.5 km)	Trans 1	Bike (40 km)	Trans 2	Run (10 km)	Total	Rank
Carolina Grimaldo	Individual	20:52; 21st	0:25; 3rd	1:03:04; 6th	0:20; 15th	39:44; 9th	2:04:29	10th
Mayra Vargas	Individual	21:42; 23rd	0:28; 17th	LAP				

== Tennis ==
Men

Athlete	Event	1st round	Round of 32	Round of 16	Quarterfinals	Semifinals	Final
Athlete	Event	Opposition Score	Opposition Score	Opposition Score	Opposition Score	Opposition Score	Opposition Score
Robert Farah Maksoud	Singles		Mauricio Doria-Medina (BOL); W 6 – 2, 6 – 1	Denis Kuola (USA); W 6 – 4, 6 – 4	Jorge Aguilar (CHI); W 6 – 0, 6 – 2	Víctor Estrella (DOM); W 6 – 4, 6 – 4	Rogério Dutra (BRA); W 6 – 4, 6 – 3 (gold)
Juan Sebastián Cabal	Singles		Olivier Sajous (HAI); W 6 – 2, 0 – 6, 7 – 6(2)	Guillermo Rivera (CHI); W 4 – 6, 6 – 4, 6 – 2	Rogério Dutra (BRA); L 6(11) – 7, 3 – 6	Did not advance	
Alejandro González	Singles		César Ramírez (MEX); W 6(4) – 7, 6 – 1, 7 – 6(1)	Marcelo Arévalo (ESA); W 5 – 3 RET	Julio César Campozano (ECU); L 6(4) – 7, 6 – 4, 5 – 7	Did not advance	
Robert Farah Maksoud; Juan Sebastián Cabal	Doubles			Joao De Souza (BRA); Rogério Dutra (BRA); W 7 – 6(5), 6 – 3	Martín Cuevas (URU); Federico Sansonetti (URU); W 6 – 1, 6 – 3	Nicholas Monroe (USA); Greg Ouellette (USA); W 7 – 6(4), 7 – 6(7)	Julio César Campozano (ECU); Roberto Quiroz (ECU); W 6 – 0, 6 – 4 (gold)

Women

Athlete	Event	Round of 32	Round of 16	Quarterfinals	Semifinals	Final
Athlete	Event	Opposition Score	Opposition Score	Opposition Score	Opposition Score	Opposition Score
Mariana Duque	Singles	Noelia Zeballos (BOL); W 6 – 3, 6 – 2	Daniela Seguel (CHI); W 7 – 5, 6 – 0	Monica Puig (PUR); L 2 – 6, 3 – 6	Did not advance	
Karen Castiblanco	Singles	Isabella Robbiani (PAR); L 6 – 2, 5 – 7, 4 – 6	Did not advance			
Catalina Castaño	Singles	Ana Paula de la Peña (MEX); W 6 – 4, 4 – 6, 6 – 2	Bianca Botto (PER); L 2 – 6, 1 – 6	Did not advance		
Catalina Castaño; Mariana Duque	Doubles			Ximena Hermoso (MEX); Valeria Pulido (MEX); W 6 – 4, 6 – 4	María Irigoyen (ARG); Florencia Molinero (ARG); L 6 – 3, 1 – 6, [10-12]	Bronze medal match: Tatiana Pereira (BRA); Vivian Segnini (BRA); W 6(2) – 7, 6 – 4, [10-6] (bronze)

Mixed doubles

Athlete	Event	Round of 16	Quarterfinals	Semifinals	Final
Athlete	Event	Opposition Score	Opposition Score	Opposition Score	Opposition Score
Karen Castiblanco; Alejandro González	Doubles	Yamile Fors (CUB); William Dorante (CUB); W 6 – 1, 6 – 4	Andrea Koch Benvenuto (CHI); Guillermo Rivera (CHI); L 6 – 4, 4 – 6, [7-10]	Did not advance	

== Water polo ==
Colombia has qualified a men's team.

Men

Team

- Andres Aguilar
- Jhon Andrade
- Nelson Bejarano
- Elkin Buitrago
- Sergio Correa
- Juan Felipe Echeverry
- Juan Felipe Giraldo
- Andres Hernandez
- Ivan Idarraga
- Jairo Lizarazo
- Jorge Montoya
- Enzo Salinas
- Carlos Toro

Standings

Team	GP	W	D	L	GF	GA	GD	Pts
Canada	3	3	0	0	46	21	+25	6
Cuba	3	2	0	1	30	33	-3	4
Mexico	3	1	0	2	24	35	-11	2
Colombia	3	0	0	3	29	40	-11	0

Results

October 23, 2011; 17:00	Report	Colombia	11–12	Cuba	Scotiabank Aquatics Center, Guadalajara; Referees: Valcarce (ARG), Werner (BRA)
October 23, 2011; 17:00	Report	Score by quarters: 2 – 2, 3 – 3, 4 – 5, 2 – 2			Scotiabank Aquatics Center, Guadalajara; Referees: Valcarce (ARG), Werner (BRA)
October 23, 2011; 17:00	Report	Idarraga 3	Goals	Cisneros 5	Scotiabank Aquatics Center, Guadalajara; Referees: Valcarce (ARG), Werner (BRA)

October 24, 2011; 18:15	Report	Colombia	11–13	Mexico	Scotiabank Aquatics Center, Guadalajara; Referees: Dester (BRA), Redding (USA)
October 24, 2011; 18:15	Report	Score by quarters: 2 – 3, 4 – 2, 1 – 4, 4 – 4			Scotiabank Aquatics Center, Guadalajara; Referees: Dester (BRA), Redding (USA)
October 24, 2011; 18:15	Report	Idarraga 3	Goals	Garcia 4	Scotiabank Aquatics Center, Guadalajara; Referees: Dester (BRA), Redding (USA)

October 25, 2011; 15:45	Report	Canada	15–7	Colombia	Scotiabank Aquatics Center, Guadalajara; Referees: Moller (ARG), Maretzki (USA)
October 25, 2011; 15:45	Report	Score by quarters: 4 – 2, 2 – 1, 6 – 1, 3 – 3			Scotiabank Aquatics Center, Guadalajara; Referees: Moller (ARG), Maretzki (USA)
October 25, 2011; 15:45	Report	Constantin 3	Goals	Bejarano, Montoya 2	Scotiabank Aquatics Center, Guadalajara; Referees: Moller (ARG), Maretzki (USA)

Elimination stage Crossover

October 27, 2011; 12:30	Report	Colombia	9–10	Argentina	Scotiabank Aquatics Center, Guadalajara
October 27, 2011; 12:30	Report	Score by quarters: 3–4, 4–3, 1–3, 1–1			Scotiabank Aquatics Center, Guadalajara

Seventh place match

October 29, 2011; 12:30	Report	Colombia	11–9	Venezuela	Scotiabank Aquatics Center, Guadalajara
October 29, 2011; 12:30	Report	Score by quarters: 2–0, 3–5, 1–1, 5–3			Scotiabank Aquatics Center, Guadalajara
October 29, 2011; 12:30	Report	Bejarano 3	Goals	Fernandez 3	Scotiabank Aquatics Center, Guadalajara

2011 Pan American Games 7th

Colombia

== Water skiing ==
Colombia has qualified a full team in the water skiing competition.

=== Men ===
Event	Athlete	Semifinal		Final	
Event	Athlete	Points	Rank	Points	Rank
Tricks	Esteban Siegert	2810	9th	Did not advance	
Tricks	Alejandro Robledo	7310	6th q	8550	6th
Slalom	Jose Fernando Mesa	33.50	9th	Did not advance	
Slalom	Alejandro Robledo	DNS		Did not advance	
Slalom	Esteban Siegert	18.50	16th	Did not advance	
Jump	Esteban Siegert	58.80	4th q	61.90	5th
Jump	Alejandro Robledo	53.00	7th q	55.10	6th
Overall	Esteban Siegert			1844.8	7th
Overall	Alejandro Robledo			2147.6	5th
Wakeboard	Juan martin Velez	37.33	4th q	45.44	5th

=== Women ===
Athlete	Event	Semifinal		Final	
Athlete	Event	Points	Rank	Points	Rank
Tricks	Maria Camila Linares	6420	3rd	7400	2nd place, silver medalist(s)
Slalom	Maria Camila Linares	20.00	8th	Did not advance	
Jump	Maria Camila Linares	DNS		Did not advance	
Overall	Maria Camila Linares			1675.3	5th

== Weightlifting ==
Athlete	Event	Snatch			Clean & Jerk			Total	Rank
Athlete	Event	Attempt 1	Attempt 2	Attempt 3	Attempt 1	Attempt 2	Attempt 3	Total	Rank
Sergio Rada	Men's 56 kg	115	118	120	146	~~150~~	~~150~~	266	2nd place, silver medalist(s)
Francisco Mosquera	Men's 56 kg	113	115	117	145	~~150~~	~~150~~	262	4th
Oscar Albeiro Figueroa	Men's 62 kg	132	135	137	165	171	175 PR	312 PR	1st place, gold medalist(s)
Diego Salazar	Men's 62 kg	128	~~132~~	132	160	~~165~~	~~165~~	292	3rd place, bronze medalist(s)
Doyler Sánchez	Men's 69 kg	135	138	~~140~~	~~172~~	172	~~174~~	310	3rd place, bronze medalist(s)
Carlos Andica	Men's 85 kg	~~153~~	153	157	191	200	205 RP	362	2nd place, silver medalist(s)
Fredy Rentería	Men's +105 kg	~~172~~	~~172~~	~~172~~	DNF				
Katherine Mercado	Women's 48 kg	70	73	~~75~~	90	92	~~94~~	165	3rd place, bronze medalist(s)
Jackelina Heredia	Women's 58 kg	93	96	~~98~~	120	~~126~~	~~126~~	216	2nd place, silver medalist(s)
Lina Rivas	Women's 58 kg	95	99	100 RP	115	~~120~~	~~120~~	215	3rd place, bronze medalist(s)
Nisidia Palomeque	Women's 63 kg	100	~~103~~	~~103~~	126	130	135 RP	235	2nd place, silver medalist(s)
Mercedes Pérez	Women's 69 kg	98	101	~~103~~	125	131 RP	~~135~~	232	1st place, gold medalist(s)
Ubaldina Valoyes	Women's 75 kg	105	110	113 RP	127	132	137	250	1st place, gold medalist(s)

== Wrestling ==
Colombia has qualified four athletes in the 60 kg, 66 kg, 74 kg, and 96 kg men's freestyle categories, seven athletes in the 55 kg, 60 kg, 66 kg, 74 kg, 84 kg, 96 kg, and 120 kg men's Greco-Roman categories, and two athletes in the 48 kg and 63 kg women's freestyle categories.

Men

Freestyle

Athlete	Event	Quarterfinals	Semifinals	Final
Athlete	Event	Opposition Result	Opposition Result	Opposition Result
Nelson Garcia	60 kg	Fernando Iglesias (ARG); L PP 1 – 3	Did not advance	
Edison Hurtado	66 kg	Liván López (CUB); L VT 0 – 5		Bronze medal match: Teyon Ware (USA); L PP 1 – 3
Nelson Garcia	74 kg	Ricardo Roberty (VEN); L SP 1 – 4	Did not advance	
Juan Esteban Martínez	96 kg	Randy Lambert (HON); W PO 3 – 0	Luis Vivenes (VEN); L PO 0 – 3	Bronze medal match: Marcos Santa (PUR); W PP 3 – 1 (bronze)

Greco-Roman

Athlete	Event	Quarterfinals	Semifinals	Final
Athlete	Event	Opposition Result	Opposition Result	Opposition Result
Juan Carlos López	55 kg	Rafael Pascoa (BRA); W PO 3 – 0	Gustavo Balart (CUB); L PO 0 – 3	Bronze medal match: Alberto Mendieta (NCA); W PP 3 – 1 (bronze)
Yesid Meneses	60 kg	Luis Liendo (VEN); L PP 1 – 3		Bronze medal match: Hanser Meoque (CUB); L PO 0 – 3
Ivan De Jesus Duque	66 kg	Glenn Garrison (USA); L PP 1 – 3	Did not advance	
Jose Uber Escobar	74 kg	Otoniel Perez (PUR); W PO 3 – 0	Jorgisbell Alvarez (CUB); L PP 1 – 3	Bronze medal match: Juan Ángel Escobar (MEX); L PP 1 – 3
Cristian Ferney Mosquera	84 kg	Marcelo Gomes (BRA); W PO 3 – 0	Yorgen Cova (VEN); W PO 3 – 0	Pablo Shorey (CUB); L PO 0 – 3 (silver)
Raul Andres Angulo	96 kg	Randy Lambert (HON); W PP 3 – 1	Turi Maier (ARG); W PO 3 – 0	Yunior Estrada (CUB); L ST 0 – 4 (silver)
Victor Alfonso Asprilla	120 kg	Edgardo Lopez (PUR); W PO 3 – 0	Rafael Barreno (VEN); L PO 0 – 3	Bronze medal match: Romel Maza (ECU); W PO 3 – 0 (bronze)

Women

Freestyle

Athlete	Event	Quarterfinals	Semifinals	Final	
Athlete	Event	Opposition Result	Opposition Result	Opposition Result	Opposition Result
Carolina Castillo	48 kg	Flor Quispe (PER); W PO 3 – 0	Clarissa Chun (USA); L PP 1 – 3	Bronze medal match: Guadalupe Perez (MEX); W PP 3 – 1 (bronze)	
Sandra Viviana Roa	63 kg	Yanet Sovero (PER); W Pp 3 – 1	Elena Pirozhkov (USA); L PP 1 – 3	Bronze medal match: Gloria Zavala (VEN); W VT 5 – 0 (bronze)	
