= Gymnastics at the 2011 Pan American Games – Women's artistic qualification =

Qualifications for Women's artistic gymnastic competitions at the 2011 Pan American Games was held at the Nissan Gymnastics Stadium on October 24. The results of the qualification determined the qualifiers to the finals: 24 gymnasts in the all-around final, and 8 gymnasts in each of 4 apparatus finals.

== Qualification results ==
=== All-Around qualifiers ===
Rank	Gymnast	Country	Vault (gymnastics)	Uneven bars	Balance beam	Floor (gymnastics)	Total
1	Ana Sofía Gómez	Guatemala	14.550	12.825	14.675	13.375	55.425
2	Peng-Peng Lee	Canada	13.875	14.275	13.675	13.500	55.325
3	Kristina Vaculik	Canada	13.850	12.725	14.275	13.775	54.625
4	Bridgette Caquatto	United States	13.925	14.625	12.975	12.775	54.300
5	Brandie Jay	United States	14.925	13.725	13.125	12.375	54.150
6	Marisela Cantù	Mexico	13.425	13.650	13.450	12.675	53.200
8	Daniele Hypólito	Brazil	14.025	12.200	13.500	13.375	53.100
9	Elsa García	Mexico	14.125	13.500	11.950	13.300	52.875
10	Jessica Gil	Colombia	14.075	12.400	13.600	12.800	52.875
14	Bruna Leal	Brazil	14.075	12.400	13.600	12.800	52.875
15	Ivet Rojas	Venezuela	14.075	12.400	13.600	12.800	52.875
17	Catalina Escobar	Colombia	15.075	11.800	12.400	13.075	52.350
19	Dovelis Torres	Cuba	14.175	12.050	11.975	13.500	51.700
21	Maciel Peña	Venezuela	13.825	11.400	13.275	13.050	51.550
23	Dayana Rodriguez	Cuba	13.975	11.775	12.700	12.725	51.175
25	Yamilet Peña	Dominican Republic	14.150	11.150	12.500	12.525	50.325
29	Daisy Pinto	Chile	13.150	12.175	12.450	11.975	49.750
30	Merlina Galera	Argentina	13.400	10.675	12.525	13.025	49.625
31	Paula Mejias	Puerto Rico	13.900	11.150	11.175	13.000	49.225
32	Lucila Estarli	Argentina	13.725	10.475	12.625	12.375	49.200
34	Sandra Collantes	Peru	13.625	10.375	11.800	12.825	48.625
35	Martina Castro	Chile	13.475	9.000	12.950	12.650	48.075
36	Elid Helwigg	Ecuador	13.000	10.300	11.700	12.500	47.500
38	Nicolle Vazquez	Puerto Rico	12.900	10.200	11.950	11.650	46.700

Only two gymnasts per country may advance to a final. The following gymnasts scored high enough to qualify, but did not do so because two gymnasts from their country had already qualified ahead of them:

- Mikaela Gerber (CAN) 53.150 (7th place)
- Karla Salazar (MEX) 52.725 (11th place)
- Ana Lago (MEX) 52.625 (12th place)
- Talia Chiarelli (CAN) 52.625 (13th place)
- Grace McLaughlin (USA) 52.500 (16th place)
- Coralie Leblond (CAN) 52.075 (18th place)
- Adrian Nunes (BRA) 51.650 (20th place)
- Yessenia Estrada (MEX) 51.475(22nd place)
- Nathalia Sánchez (COL) 50.400 (24th place)
- Yarimar Medina (VEN) 50.175 (26th place)
- Yaney Hernandez (CUB) 50.100 (27th place)
- Fanny Briceño (VEN) 49.900 (28th place)
- Yahajara Sese (CUB) 48.900 (33rd place)
- Belen Stoffel (ARG) 46.600 (37th place)

=== Individual vault ===
Rank	Gymnast	Country	Vault (gymnastics)
1	Brandie Jean Jay	United States	14.687
2	Catalina Escobar	Colombia	14.312
3	Yamilet Peña	Dominican Republic	14.087
4	Elsa García	Mexico	14.000
5	Jessica Gil	Colombia	14.000
6	Adrian Nunes	Brazil	13.925
7	Daniele Hypólito	Brazil	13.850
8	Paula Mejias	Puerto Rico	13.700

=== Individual uneven bars ===
Rank	Gymnast	Country	Uneven bars
1	Bridgette Caquatto	United States	14.625
2	Shawn Johnson	United States	14.400
3	Peng-Peng Lee	Canada	14.275
4	Marisela Cantù	Mexico	13.650
5	Bibiana Velez	Colombia	13.600
6	Elsa García	Mexico	13.500
7	Nathalia Sánchez	Colombia	13.250
8	Ivet Rojas	Venezuela	13.200

=== Individual balance beam ===
Rank	Gymnast	Country	Balance beam
1	Ana Sofía Gómez	Guatemala	14.675
2	Kristina Vaculik	Canada	14.275
3	Karla Salazar	Mexico	14.075
4	Talia Chiarelli	Canada	13.675
5	Jessica Gil	Colombia	13.600
6	Yessenia Estrada	Mexico	13.600
7	Fanny Briceño	Venezuela	13.525
8	Priscila Cobello	Brazil	13.500

=== Individual floor ===
Rank	Gymnast	Country	Floor (gymnastics)
1	Mikaela Gerber	Canada	13.950
2	Ana Lago	Mexico	13.800
3	Kristina Vaculik	Canada	13.775
4	Dovelis Torres	Cuba	13.500
5	Daniele Hypólito	Brazil	13.375
6	Ana Sofía Gómez	Guatemala	13.375
7	Elsa García	Mexico	13.300
8	Jessie Deziel	United States	13.150
