= Gymnastics at the 2011 Pan American Games – Women's vault =

The artistic gymnastic competitions at the 2011 Pan American Games was held at the Nissan Gymnastics Stadium in October 27. The results of the qualification determined the qualifiers to the finals.

== Final ==
=== Overall Results ===
| Rank | Gymnast | Vault 1 | Vault 2 | Total | |
|---|---|---|---|---|---|
| 1st place, gold medalist(s) | Brandie Jay; United States | 14.675 | 14.000 | | 14.337 |
| 2nd place, silver medalist(s) | Elsa García; Mexico | 14.325 | 14.300 | | 14.312 |
| 3rd place, bronze medalist(s) | Catalina Escobar; Colombia | 14.900 | 13.425 | | 14.162 |
| 4 | Adrian Nunes (BRA) | 14.350 | 13.575 | | 13.962 |
| 5 | Jessica Gil (COL) | 13.800 | 13.975 | | 13.887 |
| 6 | Paula Mejias (PUR) | 13.725 | 13.950 | | 13.837 |
| 7 | Daniele Hypólito (BRA) | 14.300 | 12.875 | | 13.587 |
| 8 | Yamilet Peña (DOM) | 0.000 | 13.900 | | 6.950 |

=== Vault 1 Details ===
| Rank | Gymnast | D Score | E Score | Pen. | Total |
|---|---|---|---|---|---|
| 1 | Brandie Jay (USA) | 5.800 | 8.875 | | 14.675 |
| 2 | Elsa García (MEX) | 5.300 | 9.025 | | 14.325 |
| 3 | Catalina Escobar (COL) | 5.800 | 9.100 | | 14.900 |
| 4 | Adrian Nunes (BRA) | 5.300 | 9.050 | | 14.350 |
| 5 | Jessica Gil (COL) | 5.300 | 8.800 | 0.300 | 13.887 |
| 6 | Paula Mejias (PUR) | 5.200 | 8.525 | | 13.725 |
| 7 | Daniele Hypólito (BRA) | 5.300 | 9.000 | | 14.300 |
| 8 | Yamilet Peña (DOM) | 0.000 | 0.000 | | 0.000 |

=== Vault 2 Details ===
| Rank | Gymnast | D Score | E Score | Pen. | Total |
|---|---|---|---|---|---|
| 1 | Brandie Jay (USA) | 5.200 | 8.800 | | 14.000 |
| 2 | Elsa García (MEX) | 5.200 | 9.100 | | 14.300 |
| 3 | Catalina Escobar (COL) | 4.600 | 8.825 | | 13.425 |
| 4 | Adrian Nunes (BRA) | 5.000 | 8.575 | | 13.575 |
| 5 | Jessica Gil (COL) | 5.000 | 8.975 | | 13.975 |
| 6 | Paula Mejias (PUR) | 5.300 | 8.650 | | 13.950 |
| 7 | Daniele Hypólito (BRA) | 5.200 | 7.675 | | 12.875 |
| 8 | Yamilet Peña (DOM) | 5.300 | 8.600 | | 13.900 |

== Qualification ==
| Rank | Gymnast | Vault 1 | Vault 2 | | Total | Rsl | |
|---|---|---|---|---|---|---|---|
| 1 | Brandie Jay (USA) | 14.925 | 14.450 | | | 14.687 | Q |
| 2 | Catalina Escobar (COL) | 15.075 | 13.550 | | | 14.312 | Q |
| 3 | Yamilet Peña (DOM) | 14.150 | 14.025 | | | 14.087 | Q |
| 4 | Elsa García (MEX) | 14.125 | 13.875 | | | 14.000 | Q |
| 5 | Jessica Gil (COL) | 14.075 | 13.925 | | | 14.000 | Q |
| 6 | Adrian Nunes (BRA) | 14.225 | 13.625 | | | 13.925 | Q |
| 7 | Daniele Hypólito (BRA) | 14.025 | 13.675 | | | 13.850 | Q |
| 8 | Daiane dos Santos (BRA) | 14.125 | 13.350 | | | 13.737 | |
| 9 | Paula Mejias (PUR) | 13.900 | 13.500 | | | 13.700 | Q |
| 10 | Kristina Vaculik (CAN) | 13.850 | 13.525 | | 13.687 | R | |
| 11 | Ana Lago (MEX) | 14.050 | 13.225 | 0.100 | 13.637 | R | |
| 12 | Lucila Estarli (ARG) | 13.725 | 13.300 | | 13.512 | R | |
| 13 | Coralie Leblond (CAN) | 14.100 | 12.825 | | 13.462 | | |
| 14 | Martina Castro (CHI) | 13.475 | 13.425 | | 13.450 | | |
| 15 | Makarena Pinto (CHI) | 13.150 | 13.625 | | 13.387 | | |
| 16 | Sandra Collantes (PER) | 13.625 | 12.950 | | 13.287 | | |
| 17 | Elid Helwigg (ECU) | 13.000 | 13.250 | | 13.125 | | |
| 18 | Yarimar Medina (VEN) | 13.625 | 12.600 | | 13.112 | | |
| 19 | Yessenia Estrada (MEX) | 14.300 | 11.875 | 0.300 | 13.087 | | |
| 20 | Dayana Rodríguez (CUB) | 13.975 | 12.175 | | 13.075 | | |
| 21 | Dovelis Torres (CUB) | 14.175 | 11.325 | | 12.750 | | |
