= Gymnastics at the 2011 Pan American Games – Women's artistic individual all-around =

Women's artistic team all-around at the 2011 Pan American Games
- Venue: CODE II Gymnasium
- Dates: October 26
- Competitors: 24 from 16 nations

Medalists
Gold medal	Bridgette Caquatto	United States
Silver medal	Ana Sofía Gómez	Guatemala
Bronze medal	Kristina Vaculik	Canada

The women's artistic individual all-around competition of the gymnastics events at the 2011 Pan American Games in Guadalajara, Mexico, was held on October 26 at the Nissan Gymnastics Stadium.

== Final ==
Position	Gymnast	Vault (gymnastics)	Uneven bars	Balance beam	Floor (gymnastics)	Total
1st place, gold medalist(s)	Bridgette Caquatto (USA)	14.075	14.725	13.675	13.400	55.875
2nd place, silver medalist(s)	Ana Sofía Gómez (GUA)	14.525	12.900	14.350	13.650	55.425
3rd place, bronze medalist(s)	Kristina Vaculik (CAN)	13.850	13.775	13.775	13.425	54.775
4	Christine 'Peng Peng' Lee (CAN)	14.025	12.900	13.975	13.675	54.575
5	Elsa García (MEX)	14.375	13.625	12.825	13.600	54.425
6	Brandie Jay (USA)	14.825	13.975	12.850	12.700	54.350
7	Daniele Hypólito (BRA)	14.125	12.550	13.675	13.825	54.175
8	Catalina Escobar (COL)	14.750	12.500	12.700	13.000	52.950
9	Jessica Gil (COL)	14.175	12.075	13.500	12.900	52.650
10	Ana Lago (MEX)	14.175	10.975	13.350	13.950	52.450
11	Dovélis Torres (CUB)	14.025	12.000	12.825	13.375	52.225
12	Adrian Gomes (BRA)	14.125	11.500	12.975	13.100	51.700
13	Dayana Rodríguez (CUB)	13.900	12.475	12.800	12.450	51.625
14	Ivet Rojas (VEN)	13.825	11.125	12.900	12.825	50.675
15	Merlina Galera (ARG)	13.425	11.375	12.550	12.675	50.025
16	Lucila Estarli (ARG)	13.700	10.650	12.225	12.775	49.350
17	Paula Mejías (PUR)	13.600	10.875	11.850	12.575	48.900
18	Yamilet Peña (DOM)	14.775	10.575	10.300	12.625	48.275
19	Maciel Peña (VEN)	13.675	11.425	10.325	12.475	47.900
20	Thema Williams (TRI)	12.900	11.550	10.925	11.675	47.050
21	Nicolle Vázquez (PUR)	12.925	10.300	11.075	11.600	45.900
22	Martina Castro (CHI)	12.725	9.925	10.150	12.550	45.350
23	Elid Hellwig (ECU)	11.975			12.350	24.325
24	Sandra Collantes (PER)		9.625			9.625
