= Weightlifting at the 2010 South American Games – Women's 58kg =

The Women's 58 kg event at the 2010 South American Games was held over March 27 at 14:00.

== Medalists ==
Gold	Silver	Bronze
Alexandra Escobar; Ecuador	Jackelina Heredia; Colombia	Lina Rivas; Colombia

== Results ==
Rank	Athlete	Bodyweight	Snatch			Clean & Jerk			Total
Rank	Athlete	Bodyweight	1	2	3	1	2	3	Total
1st place, gold medalist(s)	Alexandra Escobar (ECU)	57.37	93	96	98	116	121	122	220
2nd place, silver medalist(s)	Jackelina Heredia (COL)	57.10	92	95	97	~~115~~	115	122	219
3rd place, bronze medalist(s)	Lina Rivas (COL)	57.34	~~92~~	92	~~96~~	110	~~115~~	~~115~~	202
4	Eliane Silva (BRA)	57.85	~~78~~	78	~~82~~	93	98	100	178
5	Jimena Delamer (ARG)	57.12	70	~~72~~	72	83	87	~~89~~	159
6	Jennifer Piter (ARU)	56.85	55	60	~~63~~	75	~~80~~	~~80~~	135

== New Records ==
Snatch	96 kg	Alexandra Escobar (ECU)	GR
Snatch	97 kg	Jackelina Heredia (COL)	GR
Snatch	98 kg	Alexandra Escobar (ECU)	GR
Clean & Jerk	115 kg	Jackelina Heredia (COL)	GR
Clean & Jerk	116 kg	Alexandra Escobar (ECU)	GR
Clean & Jerk	121 kg	Alexandra Escobar (ECU)	GR
Clean & Jerk	122 kg	Jackelina Heredia (COL)	GR
Total	219 kg	Jackelina Heredia (COL)	GR
Total	220 kg	Alexandra Escobar (ECU)	GR
