= Mario Berríos =

Mario Berrios may refer to:

- Mario Berríos (Chilean footballer) (Mario Esteban Berríos, born 1981)
- Mario Berríos (Honduran footballer) (Mario René Berrios, born 1982)
- Mario Berríos (gymnast), Peruvian who participated in Gymnastics at the 2011 Pan American Games – Men's artistic qualification
