= Canoeing at the 2011 Pan American Games – Qualification =

The first five boats in each event qualified from the 2010 Pan American Championship in Mexico City. This gave a total of 110 out of the 130 athlete quotas used. Out of the remaining 20 spots 10 will go to countries not already qualified and the remaining 10 spots will be determined by the Pan American Canoe Federation. Out of the remaining spots, some will be awarded to Mexico if it has not qualified a boat through the Pan American Championship, therefore reducing the remaining number. An NOC can enter a maximum of 16 athletes (10 men and 6 women).

== Participating nations ==
Nation	Men								Women				Boats	Athletes
Nation	K-1 200	K-2 200	K-1 1000	K-2 1000	K-4 1000	C-1 200	C-1 1000	C-2 1000	K-1 200	K-1 500	K-2 500	K-4 500	Boats	Athletes
Argentina	X	X	X	X	X	X	X		X	X	X	X	11	12
Brazil	X	X	X	X	X	X	X	X	X	X	X	X	12	15
Canada	X	X	X	X	X	X	X	X	X	X	X	X	12	16
Chile		X		X		X	X				X		5	6
Colombia	X	X	X	X	X	X	X	X	X	X	X	X	12	12
Cuba	X	X	X	X	X	X	X	X	X	X	X	X	12	15
Ecuador	X	X				X			X	X	X		6	5
Guatemala	X	X		X					X	X			5	4
Mexico	X	X	X	X	X	X	X	X	X	X	X	X	12	16
Puerto Rico	X	X	X						X				4	3
Trinidad and Tobago	X												1	1
United States	X	X	X	X	X	X	X		X	X	X		10	9
Venezuela	X	X	X		X	X	X	X	X	X	X	X	11	11
Total: 13 NOCs	12	12	9	9	8	10	9	6	11	10	10	7	111	125

== Men ==
=== K1 200m ===
Competition	Date	Venue	Vacancies	Qualified
2010 Pan American Championship	October 2010	Mexico City	5	Cuba; Canada; United States; Argentina; Mexico
Wildcard	–	–	6	Brazil; Colombia; Ecuador; Puerto Rico; Trinidad and Tobago; Venezuela
TOTAL			11	

=== K2 200m ===
Competition	Date	Venue	Vacancies	Qualified
2010 Pan American Championship	October 2010	Mexico City	5	Canada; Argentina; Cuba; Brazil; Mexico
Wildcard	–	–	7	Chile; Colombia; Ecuador; Guatemala; Puerto Rico; United States; Venezuela
TOTAL			12	

=== K1 1000m ===
Competition	Date	Venue	Vacancies	Qualified
2010 Pan American Championship	October 2010	Mexico City	5	Cuba; Argentina; Canada; Brazil; Venezuela
Host	October 2010	Mexico City	1	Mexico
Wildcard	–	–	3	Colombia; Puerto Rico; United States
TOTAL			9	

=== K2 1000m ===
Competition	Date	Venue	Vacancies	Qualified
2010 Pan American Championship	October 2010	Mexico City	5	Cuba; Argentina; Canada; Mexico; United States
Wildcard	–	–	4	Brazil; Chile; Colombia; Guatemala
TOTAL			9	

=== K4 1000m ===
Competition	Date	Venue	Vacancies	Qualified
2010 Pan American Championship	October 2010	Mexico City	5	Cuba; Argentina; Mexico; Brazil; Canada
Wildcard	–	–	3	Colombia; United States; Venezuela
TOTAL			8	

=== C1 200m ===
Competition	Date	Venue	Vacancies	Qualified
2010 Pan American Championship	October 2010	Mexico City	5	Brazil; Canada; Cuba; Ecuador; Chile
Host	October 2010	Mexico City	1	Mexico
Wildcard	–	–	4	Argentina; Colombia; United States; Venezuela
TOTAL			10	

=== C1 1000m ===
Competition	Date	Venue	Vacancies	Qualified
2010 Pan American Championship	October 2010	Mexico City	5	Cuba; Canada; Chile; Brazil; Colombia
Host	October 2010	Mexico City	1	Mexico
Wildcard	–	–	2	Argentina; United States
TOTAL			9	

=== C2 1000m ===
Competition	Date	Venue	Vacancies	Qualified
2010 Pan American Championship	October 2010	Mexico City	5	Mexico; Canada; Cuba; Brazil; Venezuela
Wildcard	–	–	1	Colombia
TOTAL			6	

== Women ==
K1 200m

Competition	Date	Venue	Vacancies	Qualified
2010 Pan American Championship	October 2010	Mexico City	5	Cuba; Canada; United States; Argentina; Mexico
Wildcard	–	–	5	Brazil; Colombia; Ecuador; Puerto Rico; Venezuela
TOTAL			10	

K1 500m

Competition	Date	Venue	Vacancies	Qualified
2010 Pan American Championship	October 2010	Mexico City	5	United States; Canada; Cuba; Brazil; Colombia
Host	October 2010	Mexico City	1	Mexico
Wildcard	–	–	3	Argentina; Ecuador; Venezuela
TOTAL			9	

K2 500m

Competition	Date	Venue	Vacancies	Qualified
2010 Pan American Championship	October 2010	Mexico City	5	Mexico; United States; Argentina; Canada; Cuba
Wildcard	–	–	10	Brazil; Chile; Colombia; Ecuador; Venezuela
TOTAL			10	

K4 500m

Competition	Date	Venue	Vacancies	Qualified
2010 Pan American Championship	October 2010	Mexico City	5	Mexico; Argentina; Brazil; Canada; Colombia
Wildcard	–	–	2	Cuba; Venezuela
TOTAL			7	
