= Weightlifting at the 2011 Pan American Games – Women's 58 kg =

Weightlifting – Women's 58 kg at the 2011 Pan American Games
- Venue: Weightlifting Forum
- Dates: October 24
- Competitors: 5 from 4 nations

Medalists
Gold medal	Alexandra Escobar	Ecuador
Silver medal	Jackelina Heredia	Colombia
Bronze medal	Lina Rivas	Colombia

The women's 58 kg competition of the weightlifting events at the 2011 Pan American Games in Guadalajara, Mexico, was held on October 24 at the Weightlifting Forum. The defending champion was Alexandra Escobar from Ecuador.

Each lifter performed in both the snatch and clean and jerk lifts, with the final score being the sum of the lifter's best result in each. The athlete received three attempts in each of the two lifts; the score for the lift was the heaviest weight successfully lifted. This weightlifting event was the third lightest women's event at the weightlifting competition, limiting competitors to a maximum of 58 kilograms of body mass.

== Schedule ==
All times are Central Standard Time (UTC-6).

Date	Time	Round
October 24, 2011	16:00	Final

== Results ==
5 athletes from 4 countries took part.

- PR – Pan American Games record

Rank	Name	Country	Group	B.weight (kg)	Snatch (kg)	Clean & Jerk (kg)	Total (kg)
1st place, gold medalist(s)	Maria Escobar	Ecuador	A	57.56	99	122	221
2nd place, silver medalist(s)	Jackelina Heredia	Colombia	A	57.61	96	120	216
3rd place, bronze medalist(s)	Lina Rivas	Colombia	A	57.14	100 PR	115	215
4	Monica Dominguez	Mexico	A	57.94	93	113	206
5	Silvia Artola	Nicaragua	A	57.81	73	97	170

== New records ==
The following records were established and improved upon during the competition.

Snatch	99.0 kg	Lina Rivas (COL)	PR
Snatch	100.0 kg	Lina Rivas (COL)	PR
