= Weightlifting at the 2017 Summer Universiade – Women's 63 kg =

Women's 63 kg at the XXIX Summer Universiade
- Venues: Tamkang University Shao-Mo Memorial Gymnasium 7F
- Dates: 22 August 2017
- Competitors: 26 from 23 nations

Medalists
1st place, gold medalist(s)		Rim Un-sim	North Korea
2nd place, silver medalist(s)		Tima Turieva	Russia
3rd place, bronze medalist(s)		Chiang Nien-hsin	Chinese Taipei

The women's 63 kg event at the 2017 Summer Universiade was held on 22 August at the Tamkang University Shao-Mo Memorial Gymnasium 7F.

== Records ==
Prior to this competition, the existing world and Universiade records were as follows.

- Initial records

Category		Nation	Athlete	Record	Place	Date	Meet
World record	Snatch	Russia	Svetlana Tsarukayeva	117 kg	Paris, France	8 November 2011	2011 World Championships
World record	Clean & Jerk	China	Deng Wei	147 kg	Rio de Janeiro, Brazil	9 August 2016	2016 Summer Olympics
World record	Total	China	Deng Wei	262 kg	Rio de Janeiro, Brazil	9 August 2016	2016 Summer Olympics
Universiade records	Snatch	Russia (RUS)	Diana Akhmetova	105 kg	Kazan, Russia	9 July 2013	2013 Summer Universiade
Universiade records	Clean & Jerk	North Korea (PRK)	Pyon Yong-mi	133 kg	Kazan, Russia	9 July 2013	2013 Summer Universiade
Universiade records	Total	North Korea (PRK)	Pyon Yong-mi	233 kg	Kazan, Russia	9 July 2013	2013 Summer Universiade

- Broken record

Category		Nation	Athlete	Record	Place	Date
Universiade records	Snatch	North Korea (PRK)	Rim Un-sim	106 kg	New Taipei, Taiwan	22 August 2017
Universiade records	Total	North Korea (PRK)	Rim Un-sim	236 kg	New Taipei, Taiwan	22 August 2017

== Results ==
Rank	Athlete	Group	Body weight	Snatch (kg)				Clean & Jerk (kg)				Total
Rank	Athlete	Group	Body weight	1	2	3	Result	1	2	3	Result	Total
1st place, gold medalist(s)	Rim Un-sim (PRK)	A	62.79	101	104	106	106 UR	125	130	~~134~~	130	236 UR
2nd place, silver medalist(s)	Tima Turieva (RUS)	A	62.41	98	102	~~105~~	102	121	124	~~127~~	124	226
3rd place, bronze medalist(s)	Chiang Nien-hsin (TPE)	A	60.78	~~95~~	97	~~101~~	97	126	~~130~~	~~130~~	126	223
4	Liao Xiuzhu (CHN)	A	60.30	97	101	104	104	~~118~~	118	~~123~~	118	222
5	Assem Sadykova (KAZ)	A	62.88	93	96	100	100	~~120~~	120	~~127~~	120	220
6	Maude Charron (CAN)	A	62.52	91	~~94~~	94	94	117	120	~~123~~	120	214
7	Park Da-hui (KOR)	A	62.88	95	~~98~~	~~98~~	95	113	~~119~~	~~120~~	113	208
8	Tetiana Kachan (UKR)	A	62.03	85	88	~~91~~	88	105	108	111	111	199
9	Tali Darsigny (CAN)	B	61.79	86	~~90~~	~~90~~	86	106	109	~~112~~	109	195
10	Saara Sylvia Leskinen (FIN)	A	62.82	~~83~~	86	~~88~~	86	101	105	~~110~~	105	191
11	Dwi Mayassah Lestari (INA)	B	62.35	83	~~87~~	~~87~~	83	103	107	~~110~~	107	190
12	Anuujin Ganzorig (MGL)	A	61.30	83	~~87~~	~~90~~	83	100	106	~~110~~	106	189
13	Bianca Mihaela Ionita (ROU)	B	62.18	75	80	84	84	97	102	~~104~~	102	186
14	Sabine Beate Kusterer (GER)	A	61.30	~~83~~	83	~~86~~	83	103	~~107~~	~~107~~	103	186
15	Manae Arakaki (JPN)	B	61.98	79	82	~~85~~	82	99	102	~~105~~	102	184
16	Adrianne Acosta (USA)	B	62.34	~~79~~	79	~~83~~	79	102	~~105~~	~~105~~	102	181
17	Monika Dzienis (POL)	B	60.77	82	84	~~86~~	84	94	~~98~~	~~98~~	94	178
18	Alessia Joy Wälchli (SUI)	B	62.83	75	~~79~~	~~79~~	75	90	94	97	97	172
19	Yasmin Zammit Stevens (MLT)	B	63.00	74	~~77~~	~~78~~	74	93	96	98	98	172
20	Amanda W. Simonsen (DEN)	B	62.61	77	~~80~~	~~80~~	77	90	93	~~96~~	93	170
21	Maryam Cornelia Herlin (SWE)	B	62.09	75	~~78~~	~~78~~	75	88	91	~~95~~	91	166
22	Bailey Anne Lovett (NZL)	B	62.74	71	~~75~~	~~75~~	71	90	~~93~~	~~93~~	90	161
23	Denise Nicole Diaz (PER)	B	62.89	56	59	~~61~~	59	~~71~~	71	~~74~~	71	130
	Nadezda Lomova (RUS)	A	62.26	90	~~94~~	~~94~~	90	~~110~~	~~110~~	~~110~~	–	–
	Siripuch Gulnoi (THA)	A	62.50	~~100~~	~~100~~	~~100~~	–					–
	Kristin Pope (USA)	B	62.88	~~85~~	~~85~~	~~85~~	–					–
