= Gymnastics at the 2011 Pan American Games – Men's artistic qualification =

Qualifications for Men's artistic gymnastic competitions at the 2011 Pan American Games was held at the Nissan Gymnastics Stadium on October 25. The results of the qualification determined the qualifiers to the finals: 24 gymnasts in the all-around final, and 8 gymnasts in each of 6 apparatus finals.

== Qualification results ==
=== All-Around qualifiers ===
Rank	Gymnast	Country	Floor (gymnastics)	Pommel horse	Rings (gymnastics)	Vault (gymnastics)	Parallel bars	Horizontal bar	Total	Notes
1	Sergio Sasaki Junior	Brazil	14.650	14.600	13.850	16.050	14.550	14.000	87.700	Q
2	Jorge Giraldo	Colombia	13.850	13.950	14.300	15.400	14.900	14.150	86.550	Q
3	Luis Vargas	Puerto Rico	14.200	14.250	13.550	15.550	14.300	14.650	86.500	Q
4	Tomás González	Chile	15.050	13.000	14.300	16.150	14.300	13.650	86.450	Q
5	Luis Rivera	Puerto Rico	14.650	13.650	14.150	15.600	13.350	14.450	85.850	Q
6	Jossimar Calvo	Colombia	14.800	13.150	12.450	15.650	14.500	14.800	85.350	Q
7	Hugh Smith	Canada	14.400	13.600	13.950	16.100	13.500	13.150	84.700	Q
8	Petrix Barbosa	Brazil	14.000	12.450	13.750	15.550	14.200	14.100	84.050	Q
9	Christopher Maestas	United States	13.050	12.450	14.800	15.200	13.700	14.350	83.550	Q
10	Pericles Da Silva	Brazil	13.850	13.850	13.800	14.450	13.900	13.650	83.500	
11	Anderson Loran	Canada	14.300	13.900	12.800	15.150	13.300	13.550	83.000	Q
12	Federico Molinari	Argentina	13.700	13.100	14.450	15.300	12.900	13.400	82.850	Q
13	Angel Ramos	Puerto Rico	14.550	11.900	13.350	15.600	12.600	14.800	82.800	
14	Tariq Dowers	Canada	13.800	13.650	13.100	15.150	13.550	13.400	82.650	
15	Javier Cervantes	Mexico	14.050	13.800	12.800	15.200	14.200	12.400	82.450	Q
16	Jason Scott	Canada	14.300	13.900	13.300	14.450	13.050	12.600	81.600	
17	Luis Sosa	Mexico	13.000	13.950	13.400	15.300	12.850	12.950	81.450	Q
18	Nicolas Cordoba	Argentina	13.600	12.600	13.450	14.100	13.500	14.100	81.350	Q
19	Javier Sandoval	Colombia	13.050	12.550	12.700	15.300	13.700	13.500	80.800	
20	Brandon Wynn	United States	11.550	12.500	14.900	14.500	13.000	14.200	80.650	Q
21	Carlos Campaña	Cuba	13.600	10.500	12.900	15.350	14.350	13.750	80.450	Q
22	Adickxon Trejo	Venezuela	12.600	12.950	13.050	14.550	13.500	13.700	80.350	Q
23	Juan Lompizano	Argentina	13.550	13.500	11.650	14.550	13.550	13.050	79.850	
24	Mynor Juarez	Guatemala	13.050	11.750	12.000	14.900	13.300	12.800	77.800	Q
25	Ernesto Vila	Cuba	12.000	11.000	13.050	15.400	13.350	12.950	77.750	Q
26	Oscar Cañas Figeroa	El Salvador	12.200	13.400	11.700	12.750	12.800	12.800	75.650	Q
27	Byron Lopez	Ecuador	11.900	13.200	12.050	13.350	11.950	12.150	74.600	Q
28	Boris Merchan	Ecuador	13.150	11.200	12.100	14.800	11.850	10.600	73.700	Q
29	Tarik Soto Byfield	Costa Rica	13.650	10.500	9.050	14.850	11.800	12.700	72.550	Q
30	Alexander Rodríguez	Puerto Rico	14.750	14.600		14.700	13.300	14.700	72.050	
31	Diego Hypólito	Brazil	15.600	12.900		15.400	14.050	13.700	71.650	
32	Jose Quilla	Peru	11.850	10.700	11.800	13.250	11.600	11.600	70.800	Q
33	Tyler Mizoguchi	United States	14.550	13.250	14.000	15.800	12.500		70.100	
34	Osvaldo Martinez Erazun	Argentina		12.100	14.550	14.700	13.900	13.950	69.200	
35	Donothan Bailey	United States	14.550	13.900	13.450	14.950		12.200	69.050	
36	Aldo Torres	Mexico	13.500		13.500	14.600	13.200	14.000	68.800	
37	Javier Balboa	Mexico	13.450	11.700	13.350	15.300		13.450	67.250	
38	Jesus de Leon	Dominican Republic	10.600	11.300	12.400	15.250		12.400	61.950	
39	Paul Ruggeri	United States	14.550			16.100	14.450	15.200	60.300	
40	James Brochero	Colombia	14.100		13.000	15.750	13.950		56.800	
41	Rafael Morales	Puerto Rico	14.150	14.000	13.450	15.200	13.950		56.800	
42	Fabian Meza	Colombia		13.700	13.650		14.050	13.950	55.350	
43	Sho Nakamori	United States		12.750	13.600		14.600	14.050	55.000	
44	Francisco Barreto	Brazil		13.850	14.100		13.900	12.750	54.600	
45	Juan Melchiori	Argentina	14.100	12.600			13.250	12.300	52.250	
46	Mario Berrios	Peru	12.150			14.450	12.450	11.850	50.900	
47	Santiago López	Mexico		12.400	10.700		13.850	12.600	49.550	
48	Arthur Zanetti	Brazil	14.400		15.550	15.800			45.750	
49	Scott Morgan	Canada	14.650		14.250	15.400			44.300	
50	Jorge Peña	Colombia	13.350	14.400		14.950			42.700	
51	Mauro Martinez	Argentina	14.250		12.750	14.450			41.450	
52	Tommy Ramos	Puerto Rico			14.950		11.850	13.800	40.600	
53	Mathieu Csukassy	Canada		12.650			13.050	11.800	37.500	
54	Daniel Corral	Mexico		15.300			15.350		30.650	
55	Juan González	Chile	13.900			15.150			29.050	
56	Regulo Carmona	Venezuela			15.300				15.300	
