= Paola Moreira =

Puerto Rican artistic gymnast

- Full name: Paola Natalia Moreira Irizarry
- Born: 5 January 1999 (age 27)

Gymnastics career
- Discipline: Women's artistic gymnastics
- Country represented: Puerto Rico (2014–2015)

Paola Natalia Moreira Irizarry (born 5 January 1999) is a Puerto Rican former artistic gymnast. She represented Puerto Rico at the 2014 Summer Youth Olympics and at the 2015 World Artistic Gymnastics Championships.

== Gymnastics career ==
=== Junior ===
Moreira competed at the 2014 Junior Pan American Championships in Aracaju, Brazil, and finished 18th in the all-around with a total score of 45.668. With this result, she qualified to represent Puerto Rico at the 2014 Summer Youth Olympics in Nanjing, China. There, she finished 22nd in the all-around during the qualification round with a total score of 47.800. This result made her the fourth reserve for the 18-person all-around final. Her best apparatus result was the floor exercise, where she finished 17th with a score of 12.100, but she did not advance into any apparatus finals.

=== Senior ===
Moreira became age-eligible for senior international competitions in 2015. She made her senior debut at the 2015 Anadia World Challenge Cup and competed on three apparatuses. She finished 24th on the vault, 19th on the balance beam, and 15th on the floor exercise during the qualification round and did not advance into any of the apparatus finals. She won the all-around competition at the 2015 Puerto Rican national championships. She was then selected to compete at the 2015 World Championships in Glasgow alongside Andrea Maldonado and Paula Mejías. There, she finished 161st in the all-around during the qualification round, and she did not advance into any finals or receive an Olympic berth. This was the final competition of her gymnastics career.
