= Athletics at the 2011 Pan American Games – Men's 20 kilometres walk =

Men's 20 kilometres walk at the 2011 Pan American Games
- Venue: Guadalajara Circuit and Route
- Dates: October 23
- Competitors: 16 from 10 nations
- Winning time: 1:21:51

Medalists
Gold medal	Érick Barrondo	Guatemala
Silver medal	James Rendón	Colombia
Bronze medal	Luis Fernando López	Colombia

The men's 20 kilometres walk competition of the athletics events at the 2011 Pan American Games took place on the 23 of October at the Guadalajara Circuit and Route. The defending Pan American Games champion is Jefferson Pérez of Ecuador.

== Records ==
World Record	Vladimir Kanaykin (RUS)	1:17:16	Saransk, Russia	September 29, 2007
Pan American Games record	Bernardo Segura (MEX)	1:20:17	Winnipeg, Canada	July 26, 1999

== Qualification standards ==
This event did not require any qualification standard be met.

== Schedule ==
Date	Time	Round
October 23, 2011	10:40	Final

== Abbreviations ==
- All times shown are in hours:minutes:seconds

DNF	did not finish
PR	pan American games record
WR	world record
DQ	disqualified
NR	national record
PB	personal best
SB	season best

== Results ==
16 athletes from 10 countries competed.

=== Final ===
Rank	Rider	Time	Notes
1st place, gold medalist(s)	Érick Barrondo (GUA)	1:21:51	
2nd place, silver medalist(s)	James Rendón (COL)	1:22:46	
3rd place, bronze medalist(s)	Luis Fernando López (COL)	1:22:51	
4	Rolando Saquipay (ECU)	1:22:57	SB
5	Anibal Paau (GUA)	1:24:06	PB
6	Eder Sánchez (MEX)	1:25:00	
7	Diego Flores Hinojosa (MEX)	1:26:08	
8	John Nunn (USA)	1:26:30	
9	Juan Manuel Cano (ARG)	1:27:33	
10	Ronald Quispe (BOL)	1:27:54	
11	Fabio González (ARG)	1:30:40	
12	Michael Mannozzi (PER)	1:41:33	
–	Yerko Araya (CHI)		DQ
–	Caio Bonfim (BRA)		DQ
–	Allan Segura (CRC)		DQ
–	Moacir Zimmermann (BRA)		DQ
