= 2017 World Weightlifting Championships – Women's 63 kg =

The Women's 63 kg competition at the 2017 World Weightlifting Championships was held on 1 December 2017.

== Schedule ==
Date	Time	Event
30 November 2017	13:55	Group B
1 December 2017	17:25	Group A

== Medalists ==
Event	Gold		Silver		Bronze	
Snatch	Loredana Toma (ROU)	109 kg	Maude Charron (CAN)	102 kg	Lina Rivas (COL)	101 kg
Clean & Jerk	Loredana Toma (ROU)	128 kg	Rattanawan Wamalun (THA)	127 kg	Lina Rivas (COL)	124 kg
Total	Loredana Toma (ROU)	237 kg	Lina Rivas (COL)	225 kg	Mercedes Pérez (COL)	225 kg

== Records ==
Prior to this competition, the existing world records were as follows.

World Record	Snatch	Svetlana Tsarukaeva (RUS)	117 kg	Paris, France	8 November 2011
World Record	Clean & Jerk	Deng Wei (CHN)	147 kg	Rio de Janeiro, Brazil	9 August 2016
World Record	Total	Deng Wei (CHN)	262 kg	Rio de Janeiro, Brazil	9 August 2016

== Results ==
Rank	Athlete	Group	Snatch (kg)				Clean & Jerk (kg)				Total
Rank	Athlete	Group	1	2	3	Rank	1	2	3	Rank	Total
1st place, gold medalist(s)	Loredana Toma (ROU)	A	103	106	109	1st place, gold medalist(s)	123	126	128	1st place, gold medalist(s)	237
2nd place, silver medalist(s)	Lina Rivas (COL)	A	101	~~104~~	~~104~~	3rd place, bronze medalist(s)	120	124	~~127~~	3rd place, bronze medalist(s)	225
3rd place, bronze medalist(s)	Mercedes Pérez (COL)	A	97	~~101~~	101	4	~~123~~	~~124~~	124	4	225
4	Rattanawan Wamalun (THA)	A	92	96	98	5	124	~~127~~	127	2nd place, silver medalist(s)	225
5	Maude Charron (CAN)	B	95	99	102	2nd place, silver medalist(s)	118	~~122~~	122	5	224
6	Sarah Davies (GBR)	A	88	~~91~~	~~93~~	15	118	121	~~124~~	6	209
7	Maria Grazia Alemanno (ITA)	A	90	93	95	6	110	~~113~~	113	12	208
8	Chiang Nien-hsin (TPE)	A	~~90~~	~~90~~	90	11	114	118	~~122~~	7	208
9	Akane Yoshida (JPN)	A	87	90	92	8	112	115	~~117~~	8	207
10	Mahassen Fattouh (LBN)	B	86	89	91	9	108	113	~~117~~	11	204
11	Eri Mitsuke (JPN)	A	~~88~~	88	~~92~~	16	110	113	115	9	203
12	Anni Vuohijoki (FIN)	A	~~90~~	~~90~~	90	10	~~112~~	112	~~115~~	13	202
13	Mona Pretorius (RSA)	B	~~88~~	88	~~91~~	17	~~112~~	112	~~115~~	14	200
14	Irene Martínez (ESP)	B	~~92~~	92	~~97~~	7	100	105	~~108~~	21	197
15	Yadira Nazereno (ECU)	B	83	87	89	13	103	108	~~112~~	16	197
16	Galya Shatova (BUL)	B	85	~~88~~	88	18	105	108	~~110~~	17	196
17	Björk Óðinsdóttir (ISL)	B	82	85	~~88~~	21	106	109	~~112~~	15	194
18	Saara Leskinen (FIN)	B	84	87	89	14	99	104	~~109~~	22	193
19	Ganzorigiin Anuujin (MGL)	B	84	87	~~90~~	20	100	106	~~109~~	19	193
20	Mădălina Molie (ROU)	B	87	~~91~~	~~92~~	19	105	~~111~~	~~112~~	20	192
21	Eldi Paredes (PER)	B	77	80	83	22	103	107	~~109~~	18	190
—	Nguyễn Thị Tuyết Mai (VIE)	A	89	—	—	12	~~124~~	~~125~~	~~125~~	—	—
—	Angelica Roos (SWE)	B	~~85~~	~~85~~	~~85~~	—	—	—	—	—	—
—	Jessica Lucero (USA)	A	~~90~~	~~90~~	~~91~~	—	110	~~114~~	114	10	—
