= Wrestling at the 2011 Pan American Games – Women's freestyle 63 kg =

Women's Freestyle 63 kg at the 2011 Pan American Games
- Venue: CODE II Gymnasium
- Dates: October 22
- Competitors: 8 from 8 nations

Medalists
Gold medal	Katerina Vidiaux	Cuba
Silver medal	Elena Pirozhkova	United States
Bronze medal	Luz Vazquez	Argentina
Bronze medal	Sandra Roa	Colombia

The women's freestyle 63 kg competition of the wrestling events at the 2011 Pan American Games in Guadalajara, Mexico, was held on October 22 at the CODE II Gymanasium. The defending champion was Sara McMann from the United States.

This freestyle wrestling competition consisted of a single-elimination tournament, with a repechage used to determine the winner of two bronze medals. The two finalists faced off for gold and silver medals. Each wrestler who lost to one of the two finalists moved into the repechage, culminating in a pair of bronze medal matches featuring the semifinal losers each facing the remaining repechage opponent from their half of the bracket.

Each bout consisted of up to three rounds, lasting two minutes apiece. The wrestler who scored more points in each round was the winner of that round; the bout finished when one wrestler had won two rounds (and thus the match).

== Schedule ==
All times are Central Standard Time (UTC-6).

Date	Time	Round
October 22, 2011	10:40	Quarterfinals
October 22, 2011	11:28	Semifinals
October 22, 2011	18:32	Bronze medal matches
October 22, 2011	18:40	Final

== Results ==
=== Main bracket ===
Quarterfinals
Luz Vazquez (ARG)	1	1
Justine Bouchard (CAN)	0	0
Katerina Vidiaux (CUB)	3	3
Vanessa Torres (DOM)	0	0
Sandra Roa (COL)	3	1	5
Yanet Sovero (PER)	0	1	0
Elena Pirozhkova (USA)	5
Gloria Zavala (VEN)	1

Semifinals
Luz Vazques (ARG)	2	3
Katerina Vidiaux (CUB)	2	8
Sandra Roa (COL)	0	2
Elena Pirozhkova (USA)	4	8

Finals
Katerina Vidiaux (CUB)	1	6
Elena Pirozhkova (USA)	2	0

=== Repechage round ===
Two bronze medals were awarded.

Repechage round 1	Bronze Medal Bout
	Luz Vazquez (ARG)	2 1
Vanessa Torres (DOM)	Vanessa Torres (DOM)	0 0
Bye

Repechage round 1	Bronze Medal Bout
	Sandra Roa (COL)	0 3
Gloria Zavala (VEN)	Gloria Zavala (VEN)	1 1
Bye
