= Wrestling at the 2011 Pan American Games – Men's Greco-Roman 96 kg =

Men's Greco–Roman 96 kg at the 2011 Pan American Games
- Venue: CODE II Gymnasium
- Dates: October 20
- Competitors: 8 from 8 nations

Medalists
Gold medal	Yunior Estrada	Cuba
Silver medal	Raul Angulo	Colombia
Bronze medal	Erwin Caraballo	Venezuela
Bronze medal	Yuri Maier	Argentina

The men's Greco–Roman 96 kg competition of the wrestling events at the 2011 Pan American Games in Guadalajara, Mexico, was held on October 21 at the CODE II Gymanasium. The defending champion was Justin Ruiz of the United States.

This Greco-Roman wrestling competition consists of a single-elimination tournament, with a repechage used to determine the winner of two bronze medals. The two finalists face off for gold and silver medals. Each wrestler who loses to one of the two finalists moves into the repechage, culminating in a pair of bronze medal matches featuring the semifinal losers each facing the remaining repechage opponent from their half of the bracket.

Each bout consists of up to three rounds, lasting two minutes apiece. The wrestler who scores more points in each round is the winner of that rounds; the bout ends when one wrestler has won two rounds (and thus the match).

== Schedule ==
All times are Central Standard Time (UTC-6).

Date	Time	Round
October 21, 2011	10:34	Quarterfinals
October 21, 2011	11:04	Preliminary bouts
October 21, 2011	18:32	Bronze medal matches
October 21, 2011	18:40	Final

== Results ==
=== Main round ===
Quarterfinals
Randy Lambert (HON)	0	1	0
Raul Angulo (COL)	1	0	2
Korey Jarvis (CAN)	0	1
Yuri Maier (ARG)	1	2
Yunior Estrada (CUB)	0	5	1
Erwin Caraballo (VEN)	1	0	0
Joel Lopez (MEX)	0	0
Panaglotys Gounaridis (USA)	1	2

Semifinals
Raul Angulo (COL)	2	1
Yuri Maier (ARG)	0	0
Yunior Estrada (CUB)	3	1
Panaglotys Gounaridis (USA)	0	0

Finals
Raul Angulo (COL)	0	0
Yunior Estrada (CUB)	6	6

=== Repechage round ===
Two bronze medals were awarded.

Repechage round 1	Bronze Medal Bout
Randy Lambert (HON)
Bye	Yuri Maier (ARG)	5
	Randy Lambert (HON)	1

Repechage round 1	Bronze Medal Bout
Erwin Caraballo (VEN)
Bye	Panaglotys Gounaridis (USA)	0 0
	Erwin Caraballo (VEN)	2 1
