= Weightlifting at the 2011 Pan American Games – Men's 69 kg =

Weightlifting – Men's 69 kg at the 2011 Pan American Games
- Venue: Weightlifting Forum
- Dates: October 24
- Competitors: 9 from 8 nations

Medalists
Gold medal	Israel Rubio	Venezuela
Silver medal	Junior Sanchez	Venezuela
Bronze medal	Doyler Sanchez	Colombia

The men's 69 kg competition of the weightlifting events at the 2011 Pan American Games in Guadalajara, Mexico, was held on October 24 at the Weightlifting Forum. The defending champion was Yordanis Borrero from Cuba.

Each lifter performed in both the snatch and clean and jerk lifts, with the final score being the sum of the lifter's best result in each. The athlete received three attempts in each of the two lifts; the score for the lift was the heaviest weight successfully lifted. This weightlifting event was the third lightest men's event at the weightlifting competition, limiting competitors to a maximum of 69 kilograms of body mass.

== Schedule ==
All times are Central Standard Time (UTC-6).

Date	Time	Round
October 24, 2011	14:00	Final

== Results ==
10 athletes from 9 countries took part.

- PR – Pan American Games record

Rank	Name	Country	Group	B.weight (kg)	Snatch (kg)	Clean & Jerk (kg)	Total (kg)
1st place, gold medalist(s)	Israel Rubio	Venezuela	A	67.97	145	173	318 PR
2nd place, silver medalist(s)	Junior Sanchez	Venezuela	A	67.58	145	165	310
3rd place, bronze medalist(s)	Doyler Sanchez	Colombia	A	67.77	138	172	310
4	Bredni Roque	Cuba	A	68.36	138	171	309
5	Enrique Valencia	Ecuador	A	67.49	137	165	302
6	Juan Peña	Dominican Republic	A	68.75	130	163	293
7	Hugo Catalan	Argentina	A	67.85	130	156	286
8	Eddy Peña	Nicaragua	A	68.73	110	140	250
–	Oscar Valdizon	Guatemala	A	68.41	60	–	DNF
–	William Clark	Canada	A	68.22	–	–	DNF

== New records ==
The following records were established and improved upon during the competition.

Total	318.0 kg	Israel Rubio (VEN)	PR
