= Chiang Nien-hsin =

Taiwanese weightlifter (born 1997)

Chiang Nien-hsin 江念欣 (born April 29, 1997) is a Taiwanese weightlifter, from Taoyuan District, Kaohsiung, a Mountain Indigenous District.

A member of the Bunun people, she has won several international medals, including gold at the 2014 Youth Olympics and bronzes at Weightlifting at the 2017 Summer Universiade – Women's 63 kg and the 2017 Asian Weightlifting Championships. She competed at the 2020 Olympics. Her best result at the World Weightlifting Championships is 8th, at the 2017 World Weightlifting Championships – Women's 63 kg.

She represented Chinese Taipei at the 2020 Summer Olympics in Tokyo, Japan. She competed in the women's 55 kg event, finishing thirteenth.
