= Cycling at the 2011 Pan American Games – Men's cross-country =

Men's cross-country at the 2011 Pan American Games
- Venue: Pan American Mountain Bike Circuit
- Dates: October 15
- Competitors: 21 from 12 nations

Medalists
Gold medal	Héctor Leonardo Páez	Colombia
Silver medal	Max Plaxton	Canada
Bronze medal	Jeremiah Bishop	United States

The men's cross-country competition of the cycling events at the 2011 Pan American Games was held on October 15 at the Pan American Mountain Bike Circuit in Tapalpa. The defending Pan American Games champion is Adam Craig of the United States, while the defending Pan American Championship, champion is Hector Paez of Colombia.

== Schedule ==
All times are Central Standard Time (UTC-6).

Date	Time	Round
October 15, 2011	11:30	Final

== Results ==
21 competitors from 12 countries are scheduled to compete.

Rank	Rider	Time
1st place, gold medalist(s)	Héctor Leonardo Páez (COL)	1:31:12
2nd place, silver medalist(s)	Max Plaxton (CAN)	1:31:29
3rd place, bronze medalist(s)	Jeremiah Bishop (USA)	1:32:41
4	Mario Rojas (COL)	1:34:21
5	Rubens Valeriano (BRA)	1:36:39
6	Edivando Cruz (BRA)	1:36:50
7	Ignacio Torres (MEX)	1:37:50
8	Derek Zandstra (CAN)	1:38:21
9	Jose Esquivel (CRC)	1:39:55
10	Federico Ramirez (CRC)	1:40:44
11	Luciano Caraccioli (ARG)	1:41:22
12	Ricardo Hazbún (CHI)	1:42:00
13	Stephen Ettinger (USA)	1:44:55
14	Antonio Guzman (VEN)	1:45:44

=== Did not finish ===
- Charli Quiñonez (ESA)
- Lizardo Benitez (CUB)
- Vincente Sanabria (CUB)
- Jose Escarcega (MEX)
- Javier Puschel (CHI)

=== Disqualified ===
- Catriel Soto (ARG)

=== Did not start ===
- Kelvin Gonzalez (PUR)
