= Weightlifting at the 2011 Pan American Games – Men's 56 kg =

Weightlifting – Men's 56 kg at the 2011 Pan American Games
- Venue: Weightlifting Forum
- Dates: October 23
- Competitors: 7 from 4 nations

Medalists
Gold medal	Sergio Álvarez	Cuba
Silver medal	Sergio Rada	Colombia
Bronze medal	Jose Montes	Mexico

The men's 56 kg competition of the weightlifting events at the 2011 Pan American Games in Guadalajara, Mexico, was held on October 23 at the Weightlifting Forum. The defending champion was Sergio Álvarez from Cuba.

Each lifter performed in both the snatch and clean and jerk lifts, with the final score being the sum of the lifter's best result in each. The athlete received three attempts in each of the two lifts; the score for the lift was the heaviest weight successfully lifted. This weightlifting event was the lightest men's event at the weightlifting competition, limiting competitors to a maximum of 56 kilograms of body mass.

== Schedule ==
All times are Central Standard Time (UTC-6).

Date	Time	Round
October 23, 2011	12:00	Final

== Results ==
7 athletes from four countries took part.

Rank	Name	Country	Group	B.weight (kg)	Snatch (kg)	Clean & Jerk (kg)	Total (kg)
1st place, gold medalist(s)	Sergio Álvarez	Cuba	A	55.91	119	148	267
2nd place, silver medalist(s)	Sergio Rada	Colombia	A	55.60	120	146	266
3rd place, bronze medalist(s)	José Montes	Mexico	A	55.33	112	150	262
4	Francisco Mosquera	Colombia	A	55.58	117	145	262
5	Julio Salamanca	El Salvador	A	55.38	110	140	250
6	Marvin Aquino	El Salvador	A	55.43	108	135	243
7	Roger Can	Mexico	A	54.89	100	128	228
