= Weightlifting at the 2011 Pan American Games – Men's 62 kg =

Weightlifting – Men's 62 kg at the 2011 Pan American Games
- Venue: Weightlifting Forum
- Dates: October 23
- Competitors: 9 from 6 nations

Medalists
| Gold medal | Óscar Figueroa | Colombia |
| Silver medal | Jesus Lopez | Venezuela |
| Bronze medal | Diego Salazar | Colombia |

The men's 62 kg competition of the weightlifting events at the 2011 Pan American Games in Guadalajara, Mexico, was held on October 23 at the Weightlifting Forum. The defending champion was Diego Salazar from Colombia.

Each lifter performed in both the snatch and clean and jerk lifts, with the final score being the sum of the lifter's best result in each. The athlete received three attempts in each of the two lifts; the score for the lift was the heaviest weight successfully lifted. This weightlifting event was the second-lightest men's event at the weightlifting competition, limiting competitors to a maximum of 62 kilograms of body mass.

== Schedule ==
All times are Central Standard Time (UTC-6).

| Date | Time | Round |
|---|---|---|
| October 23, 2011 | 16:00 | Final |

== Results ==
9 athletes from 6 countries took part.

- PR – Pan American Games record

| Rank | Name | Country | Group | B.weight (kg) | Snatch (kg) | Clean & Jerk (kg) | Total (kg) |
|---|---|---|---|---|---|---|---|
| 1st place, gold medalist(s) | Óscar Figueroa | Colombia | A | 61.85 | 137 | 175 PR | 312 PR |
| 2nd place, silver medalist(s) | Jesus Lopez | Venezuela | A | 61.83 | 130 | 166 | 296 |
| 3rd place, bronze medalist(s) | Diego Salazar | Colombia | A | 61.80 | 132 | 160 | 292 |
| 4 | José Peguero | Dominican Republic | A | 61.85 | 124 | 140 | 264 |
| 5 | Welinton Pec | Guatemala | A | 61.48 | 105 | 150 | 255 |
| 6 | Miguel Cantun | Mexico | A | 61.47 | 110 | 140 | 250 |
| 7 | Alex Hernandez | Guatemala | A | 61.62 | 108 | 136 | 240 |
| 8 | Mauro Acosta | Uruguay | A | 61.17 | 86 | 124 | 210 |
| – | Ivis Araujo | Mexico | A | 61.50 | 113 | – | DNF |

== New records ==
The following records were established and improved upon during the competition.

| Clean & Jerk | 171.0 kg | Óscar Figueroa (COL) | PR |
| Clean & Jerk | 175.0 kg | Óscar Figueroa (COL) | PR |
| Total | 312.0 kg | Óscar Figueroa (COL) | PR |
