= Doyler Sánchez =

Colombian weightlifter (born 1988)

Personal information
- Born: 12 October 1988 (age 37) Cúcuta, Colombia

Sport
- Sport: Weightlifting
Medal record
Representing Colombia
Pan American Games
Bronze medal – third place	2011 Guadalajara	69kg

Doyler Eustoquio Sánchez Guerrero (born 12 October 1988) is a Colombian weightlifter. He competed in the 69 kg event at the 2012 Summer Olympics and finished 14th. Sánchez won the bronze in the 69kg event of the 2011 Pan American Games.
