= Jorge Peña =

Chilean footballer

Personal information
- Full name: Jorge Benito Peña Canales
- Date of birth: 11 July 2000 (age 26)
- Place of birth: Valparaíso, Chile
- Height: 1.84 m (6 ft 0 in)
- Position: Goalkeeper

Team information
- Current team: O'Higgins (on loan from Unión La Calera)
- Number: 1

Youth career
- Escuela Ronnel Sport
- Defensa Caleta Portales
- 2010–2018: Everton

Senior career*
Years	Team	Apps	(Gls)
2018–2024	Everton	1	(0)
2023	→ San Luis (loan)	0	(0)
2024	→ Unión La Calera (loan)	11	(0)
2025–	Unión La Calera	30	(0)
2026–	→ O'Higgins (loan)	2	(0)
- * Club domestic league appearances and goals as of 24 August 2026

Jorge Benito Peña Canales (born 11 July 2000) is a Chilean footballer who plays as a goalkeeper for Chilean Primera División side O'Higgins on loan from Unión La Calera.

== Club career ==
Born in Valparaíso, Chile, Peña was with Escuela de Fútbol (Football Academy) Ronnel Sport and the club Defensa Caleta Portales before joining the Everton de Viña del Mar youth ranks, aged 9. Promoted to the first team in 2018, he made his professional debut in the 1–0 away loss against Audax Italiano for the Chilean Primera División on 13 August 2022.

In 2023, Peña was loaned out to San Luis de Quillota in the Chilean second division. The next season, he was loaned out to Unión La Calera in the Chilean Primera División and made an apeearance in the 2024 Copa Sudamericana match against Alianza FC on 30 May 2024.

After getting regularity with Unión La Calera during 2024, Peña renewed with them until the 2027 season. In January 2026, Peña was loaned out to O'Higgins.
