= Jackelina Heredia =

Colombian weightlifter (born 1988)

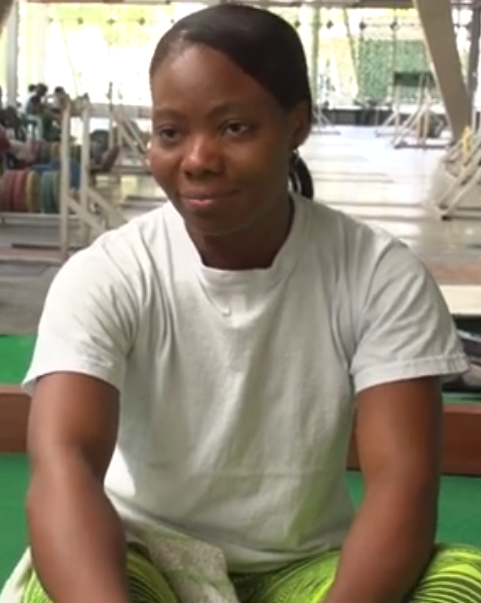
- In a 2014 interview

Personal information
- Nationality: Colombian
- Born: 31 December 1988 (age 37) Turbo, Antioquia

Sport
- Country: Colombia
- Sport: Weightlifting
- Weight class: 58 kg

Achievements and titles
- Olympic finals: 2012
Medal record
Representing Colombia
Women's weightlifting
Pan American Games
Silver medal – second place	2011 Guadalajara	58 kg
Central American and Caribbean Games
Silver medal – second place	2018 Barranquilla	63 kg CJ
Bronze medal – third place	2018 Barranquilla	63 kg S
South American Games
Gold medal – first place	2014 Santiago	58 kg
Gold medal – first place	2018 Cochabamba	63 kg
- Updated on 14 October 2025

Jackelina Heredia Cuesta (born 31 December 1988) is a Colombian weightlifter. She competed at the 2012 Summer Olympics in the women's 58 kg. She won the gold medal in snatch and clean & jerk during the 2014 Pan American Sports Festival.
