= Lina Rivas =

Colombian weightlifter (born 1990)

Personal information
- Nationality: Colombian
- Born: 24 April 1990 (age 36) Chigorodó, Colombia
- Height: 1.59 m (5 ft 3 in)
- Weight: 58 kg (128 lb)

Sport
- Country: Colombia
- Sport: Weightlifting
- Weight class: 58kg
- Event: Women's 58 kg

Achievements and titles
- Olympic finals: 2012, 2016
Medal record
Representing Colombia
Women's weightlifting
World Championships
Silver medal – second place	2017 Anaheim	63 kg
Pan American Games
Gold medal – first place	2015 Toronto	58 kg
Bronze medal – third place	2011 Guadalajara	58 kg

Lina Marcela Rivas Ordoñez (born 24 April 1990) is a Colombian weightlifter. She competed at the 2012 Summer Olympics in the women's 58 kg. She competed in the same event at the 2016 Summer Olympics, finishing in 7th place with a total of 216 kg.
