= Catalina Escobar =

Colombian artistic gymnast (born 1990)

- Full name: Catalina Elena Escobar Gómez
- Born: 21 September 1990 (age 35) Medellín, Colombia
- Height: 156 cm (5 ft 1 in)

Gymnastics career
- Discipline: Women's artistic gymnastics
- Country represented: Colombia (2006-2016)
- Club: Boyaca
Medal record
Pan American Games
Bronze medal – third place	2011 Guadalajara	Vault
South American Games
Gold medal – first place	2010 Medellín	Vault
Silver medal – second place	2010 Medellín	Team
Silver medal – second place	2010 Medellín	Uneven bars
Bronze medal – third place	2006 Buenos Aires	Team
South American Championships
Gold medal – first place	2009 Sogamoso	Vault
Silver medal – second place	2009 Sogamoso	Team
Bronze medal – third place	2009 Sogamoso	Uneven bars
Bronze medal – third place	2009 Sogamoso	Floor exercise
FIG World Cup
Event / 1st / 2nd / 3rd; World Challenge Cup / 1 / 0 / 2

Catalina Elena Escobar Gómez (born 21 September 1990) is a Colombian former artistic gymnast. She represented Colombia at the 2016 Summer Olympics but was injured during the competition. She is the 2011 Pan American Games vault bronze medalist and the 2010 South American Games and 2009 South American Championships vault champion.

== Gymnastics career ==
Escobar finished fourth with the Colombian team at the 2006 Central American and Caribbean Games. She competed at the 2006 World Championships and finished 138th in the all-around qualifications.

Escobar finished 61st in the all-around qualifications at the 2009 World Championships. At the 2009 South American Championships, she led Colombia to the team silver medal, behind Brazil. Individually, she won the gold medal in the vault final and bronze medals on the uneven bars and floor exercise.

At the 2010 South American Games, Escobar helped Colombia win the team silver medal, behind Brazil. She won a gold medal in the vault final, and she won a silver medal in the uneven bars final, behind Jessica López. She then competed at the 2010 World Championships and finished 34th with the Colombian team. She represented Colombia at the 2011 Pan American Games and won the bronze medal in the vault final behind Brandie Jay and Elsa García. She then competed at the 2011 World Championships and finished 95th in the all-around qualifications.

In 2013, Escobar spent the year training in Houston, Texas. At the 2013 World Championships, she finished 58th in the all-around qualifications. She injured her foot at the 2013 Bolivarian Games, but still won a silver medal as part of the team.

Escobar placed 17th in the all-around at the 2014 Pan American Championships and did not advance into any apparatus finals. She helped Colombia place 25th at the 2014 World Championships, and she placed 64th in the individual all-around. She then won a bronze medal in the team event at the 2014 Central American and Caribbean Games.

At the 2016 Olympic Test Event, Escobar placed 57th in the all-around and earned one of the available Olympic berths. Before the Olympics, she competed at the Mersin World Challenge Cup and won a gold medal on the uneven bars. Additionally, she won bronze medals on the vault and balance beam.

Escobar competed at the 2016 Summer Olympics and completed her uneven bars and balance beam routines but fell twice off the balance beam. While competing on the floor exercise, she injured her ankles and withdrew from the rest of the competition. She had a grade II sprain in her right ankle and a grade I sprain in her left ankle. She retired from competition after the Olympic Games.
