= Paula Mejías =

Puerto Rican artistic gymnast

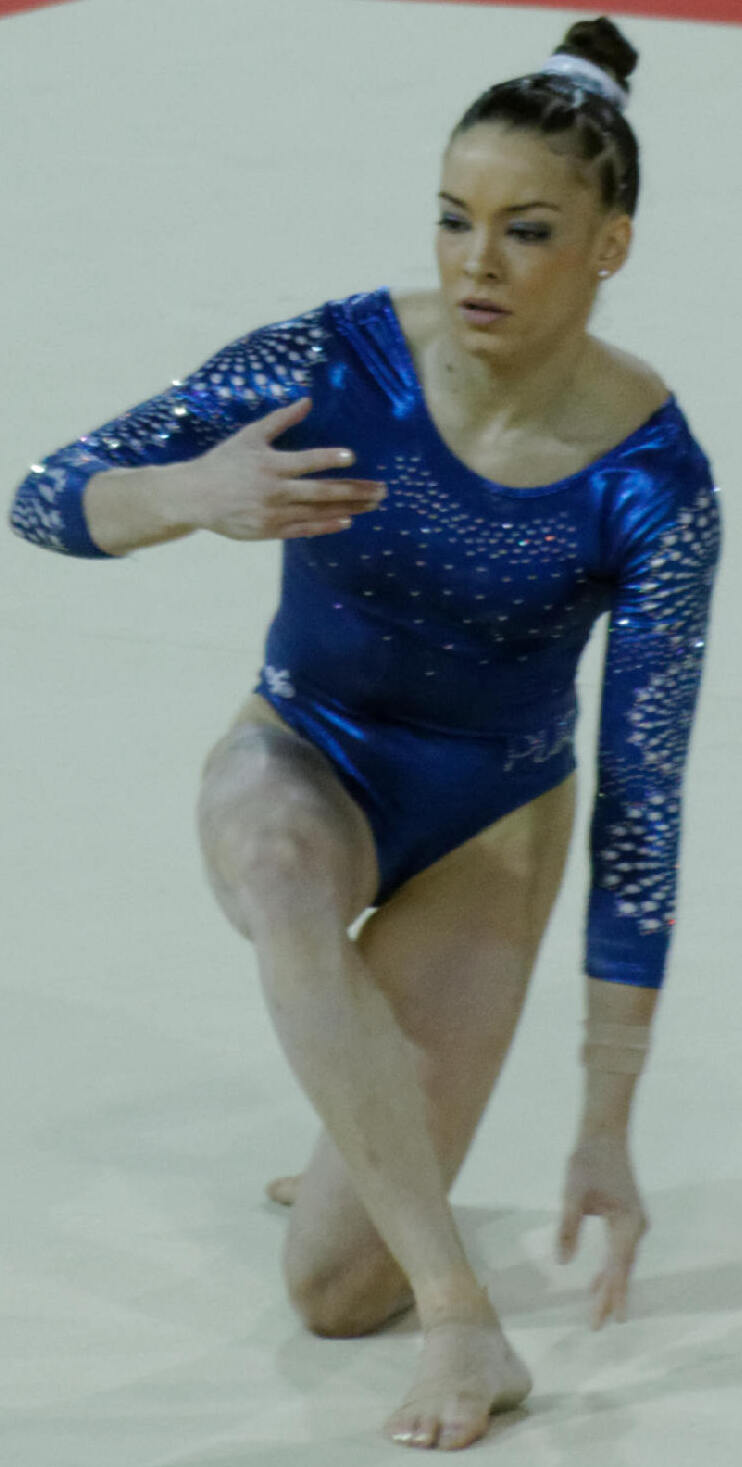
- Mejías at the 2015 Pan American Games

Personal information
- Full name: Paula Andrea Mejías Rodriguez
- Born: 4 April 1994 (age 32) Arroyo, Puerto Rico

Gymnastics career
- Discipline: Women's artistic gymnastics
- Country represented: Puerto Rico (2011–2019)
Medal record
Pan American Championships
Silver medal – second place	2012 Medellín	Vault
FIG World Cup
Event	1st	2nd	3rd
Apparatus World Cup	0	1	0
World Challenge Cup	4	0	0
Total	4	1	0

Paula Andrea Mejías Rodriguez (born 4 April 1994) is a Puerto Rican former artistic gymnast. She is the 2012 Pan American Championships vault silver medalist. She is a four-time FIG World Challenge Cup champion.

== Gymnastics career ==
Mejías began gymnastics when she was four years old. She began her training in Salinas, Puerto Rico, but later moved to the United States.

At the 2011 Pan American Games, Mejías advanced to the all-around final and finished 17th. She also advanced to the vault final and finished sixth. She competed at the 2011 World Championships and finished 121st in the all-around qualifications. She won a silver medal on the vault, behind Yamilet Peña, at the 2012 Pan American Championships.

Mejías represented Puerto Rico at the 2015 Pan American Games and qualified for the all-around, vault, and floor exercise finals. She placed 19th in the all-around final. She balked on her first vault in the finals and received a score of 0 to finish in last place. She then placed seventh in the floor exercise final. She won gold medals on both the vault and floor exercise at the 2015 Osijek World Challenge Cup.

Mejías was unable to compete at the 2015 Puerto Rican Championships due to flight issues caused by Tropical Storm Erika. She was still selected to compete at the 2015 World Championships in Glasgow alongside Andrea Maldonado and Paola Moreira. There, she finished 114th in the all-around during the qualification round, and she did not advance into any finals or receive an Olympic berth.

Mejías won a gold medal on the vault at the 2016 Ljubljana World Challenge Cup by 0.125 points ahead of Teja Belak. She competed on the vault and the floor exercise at the 2017 World Championships but did not advance into either event final.

Mejías won a silver medal on the floor exercise, behind Vanessa Ferrari, at the 2019 Melbourne World Cup. Then at the Guimaraes World Challenge Cup, she won a gold medal on the vault. She represented Puerto Rico at the 2019 Pan American Games but did not advance into any individual finals.
