= Jessica Gil Ortiz =

Colombian artistic gymnast (born 1990)

- Born: 7 December 1990 (age 35) Miami, Florida, United States

Gymnastics career
- Discipline: Women's artistic gymnastics
- Country represented: Colombia
Medal record
Pacific Rim Championships
Silver medal – second place	2008 San Jose	Vault
Pan American Championships
Bronze medal – third place	2010 Guadalajara	Vault
South American Games
Bronze medal – third place	2006 Buenos Aires	Team
Bronze medal – third place	2006 Buenos Aires	Vault
South American Championships
Gold medal – first place	2011 Santiago	Floor Exercise

Jessica Gil Ortiz (born 7 December 1990) is a Colombian former artistic gymnast who competed at the 2012 Summer Olympics. She was the first Colombian gymnast to win a gold medal on the World Cup series.

== Early life and education ==
Ortiz was born in Miami; her parents were Colombian immigrants. Her mother owned a gym, which was how she was introduced to the sport.

She studied business in Miami.

== Career ==
Ortiz competed at the 2006 World Championships, where she placed 84th in all-around qualifications. The next year, she finished in 59th place at the 2007 World Championships. She had hoped to qualify for the 2008 Summer Olympics at the competition, but she missed doing so after she fractured her heel a day before the competition; she fell on the balance beam due to her injury.

At the 2009 World Championships, held in London, Ortiz fell on a double front somersault during her second tumbling pass and landed on her head. She was taken to the hospital. Hers was one of several injuries that occurred at the championships. However, she was not seriously injured by the fall.

In January 2010, Ortiz went to a clinic with severe abdominal pain and had emergency surgery for appendicitis. She spent a month in the hospital. Afterward, she struggled to train and initially decided to leave gymnastics; however, her parents convinced her to begin training again. She competed at the World Cup in Ghent in September, where she won gold in the vault final. This was the first medal won by a Colombian gymnast on the World Cup circuit.

She entered the 2010 World Championships but did not compete. The next year, she competed at the 2011 World Championships and finished 77th in qualifications.

At the 2012 Gymnastics Olympic Test Event in January, Ortiz qualified for the 2012 Summer Olympics in London. She competed there later in the year, where she finished 42nd in the all-around qualifications.
