= Eduardo Vilaro =

Cuban American dancer (b. 1964)

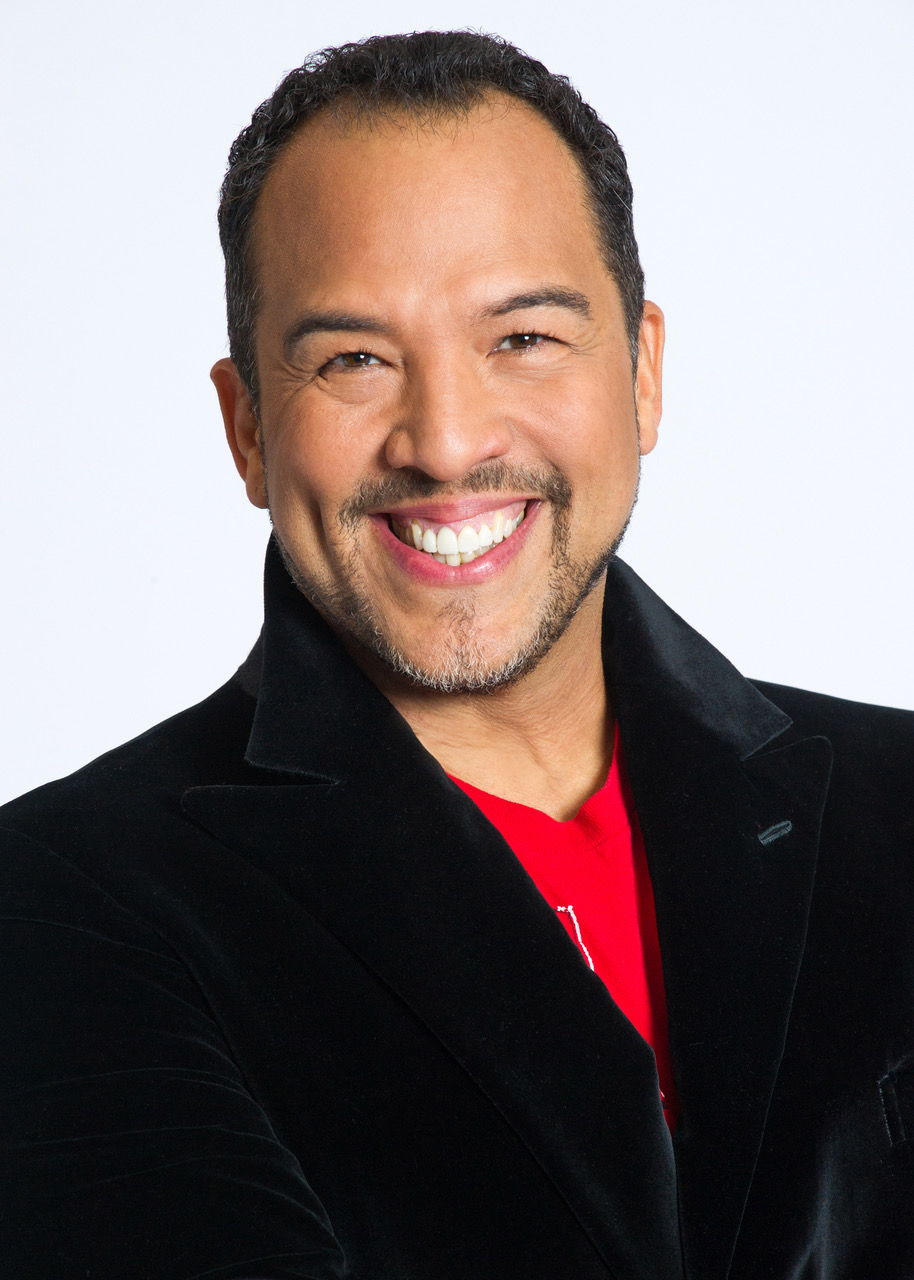
- Born: July 30, 1964; Havana, Cuba
- Education: Adelphi University (BFA); Columbia College Chicago (MA)
- Occupation(s): Artistic director & CEO of Ballet Hispánico, founder/director of Luna Negra Dance Theater, choreographer, educator, dancer
- Years active: 1985 – present
- Spouse: David Norfleet-Vilaro (m. 2006)
- Children: Maximiliano Norfleet-Vilaro (b. 2007)

Eduardo Vilaro is a Cuban-American dancer, choreographer, educator, and artistic director & CEO of Ballet Hispánico. He first joined Ballet Hispánico as a principal dancer in 1985, leaving for Chicago a decade later to further his education and found the Luna Negra Dance Theater, for which he was artistic director. He returned to Ballet Hispánico in 2009 as artistic director, the second since the organization's founding in 1970, and has also served as CEO for the company since 2015 when a reorganization merged these artistic and administrative roles. His vision for Ballet Hispánico draws on the Latin dance traditions and educational outreach set forth by founder Tina Ramirez while responding to the more complex cultural landscape of the 21st century with a greater focus on diversity, inclusion, and community engagement.

== Early life ==
Born in Havana, Cuba in the borough of Marianao (home of the Tropicana), Vilaro is the middle child of three brothers. His parents—Pascual Vilaro, an engineer, and Georgina Fernández, a homemaker—left Cuba with their children to seek political asylum in 1969, when Vilaro was five years old, during the second wave of refugee migration from that country. They arrived first in Miami, Florida, and a few days later, joined Vilaro’s family in New York City.

The family settled in the Southwest Bronx, where Vilaro’s father translated his education degree by attending night classes while working for Brooklyn Union Gas Company, and his mother trained and worked as a cosmetician. There, Vilaro attended St. Mary Margaret Elementary School and then Fordham Preparatory School. His immigrant experience and the example of his mother’s fortitude as she established her family in a new country later provided a model for Vilaro's dedication to dance, the arts, and community work.

== Dance education ==
While childhood memories of dancing with his mother embedded Latin dance and Caribbean music as early cultural influences, Vilaro credits an eighth-grade production of You're a Good Man, Charlie Brown—he played Linus, and was assigned the task of creating his own choreography with a blanket for a “partner”—as the event which awakened his desire to perform and enter the arts.

He attended Adelphi University in Garden City, New York, majoring in dance under the direction of Norman Walker, and studying modern dance as well as classical technique with former Ballets Russes instructors. He graduated with a Bachelor in Fine Arts. Additionally, Vilaro took class at the Martha Graham Contemporary Dance School (part of the Martha Graham Dance Company) and the Ailey School (affiliated with Alvin Ailey American Dance Theater).

Soon after graduation in 1985, while attending a company class at Ballet Hispánico, founder and then-director Tina Ramirez took note of the young dancer, and invited Vilaro to join the company. This introduction initiated an ongoing mentorship by Ramirez and a decade of first-hand exposure to the management of an established dance company. Vilaro was a principal dancer, originating roles in a range of works by choreographers such as Talley Beatty, George Faison, Vincente Nebrada, Ramón Oller, and Graciela Daniele, and performing throughout the U.S. and in Latin America and Europe. He also assisted Ramirez in the development of dance education residencies, and eventually became an instructor at the company’s School of Dance, where he composed short sequences for the students. After a decade with Ballet Hispánico, Vilaro moved to Chicago to pursue educational and artistic goals.

== Graduate studies and Luna Negra Dance Theater ==
In 1996, Vilaro enrolled at Columbia College Chicago for a Master’s in Interdisciplinary Arts. In tandem with his graduate work, he studied with master dance teacher Anna Paskevska, who offered instruction in the classical training and development of young dancers, an experience that laid the groundwork for Vilaro’s next endeavor—starting a dance company to offer Latino arts and culture to a Midwest audience.

Vilaro founded Luna Negra Dance Theater with his life savings in 1999, right after graduating from Columbia College. There, Vilaro choreographed full-length dance programs, and the fledgling company initially performed with 4–5 dancers (Vilaro occasionally among them) in small, sometimes partially filled, venues. Over time, the company became more established, performing at Chicago’s NEXT Dance Festival, the Chicago Cultural Center, the Ravinia Festival, the Mexican Fine Arts Center Museum, and the Pritzker Pavilion, while eventually acquiring a permanent home at the Harris Theater for Music and Dance as one of its first resident companies.

Vilaro choreographed over 20 works for Luna Negra; commissioned works from other Latino choreographers, such as Annabelle Lopez Ochoa and Miguel Mancillas; and collaborated with Peruvian singer Susana Baca, Brazilian jazz vocalist Luciana Souza, Cuban-American saxophonist Paquito D’Rivera, musicians Tiempo Libre, the Chicago Sinfonietta, and Chicago Symphony Orchestra. When Vilaro departed to take on the directorship of Ballet Hispánico, Luna Negra was a company of a dozen dancers, an eclectic repertory, and Gustavo Ramírez Sansano—a choreographer who began his work at Luna Negra—at the helm.

== Leadership at Ballet Hispánico ==
In 2009, Vilaro became the second artistic director of Ballet Hispánico, a New York-based, American dance company founded in 1970 by Tina Ramirez who served as its first artistic director. In 2015, he also assumed CEO responsibilities. When Vilaro rejoined Ballet Hispánico, the company was poised to reassess and expand its cultural vision and community role. Steeped in Ballet Hispánico’s founding principles of education, outreach, and performance as vehicles for cultural exchange, Vilaro has adapted the company's mission for a more global and multi-faceted cultural landscape. “Culture is not static,” he says, “and our community engagement keeps us connected to the realities in our communities.”

Over its history, Ballet Hispánico has performed for over 3 million people in 48 U.S. states and territories, 11 countries, and three continents. In furthering the artistic scope of the company, Vilaro has overseen expanded programming, such as: the creation of the Instituto Coreográfico, established to support and cultivate emerging Latino choreographers; participation as one of four American dance companies in the Lincoln Center at the Movies: Great American Dance series, streamed to over 600 U.S. cinemas; the opening of Ballet Hispánico’s newly renovated home in the Arnhold Center on the Upper West Side; community educational programs, such as Latin social dance classes, offered at the United Palace Theatre in Washington Heights, Manhattan; and Ballet Hispánico Communities, satellite sites for educational programs, performance, and community engagement, the first at California State University in Los Angeles, with plans to develop similar partnerships in other Latino and Chicano hubs, such as Houston and Miami.

== Arts advocacy ==
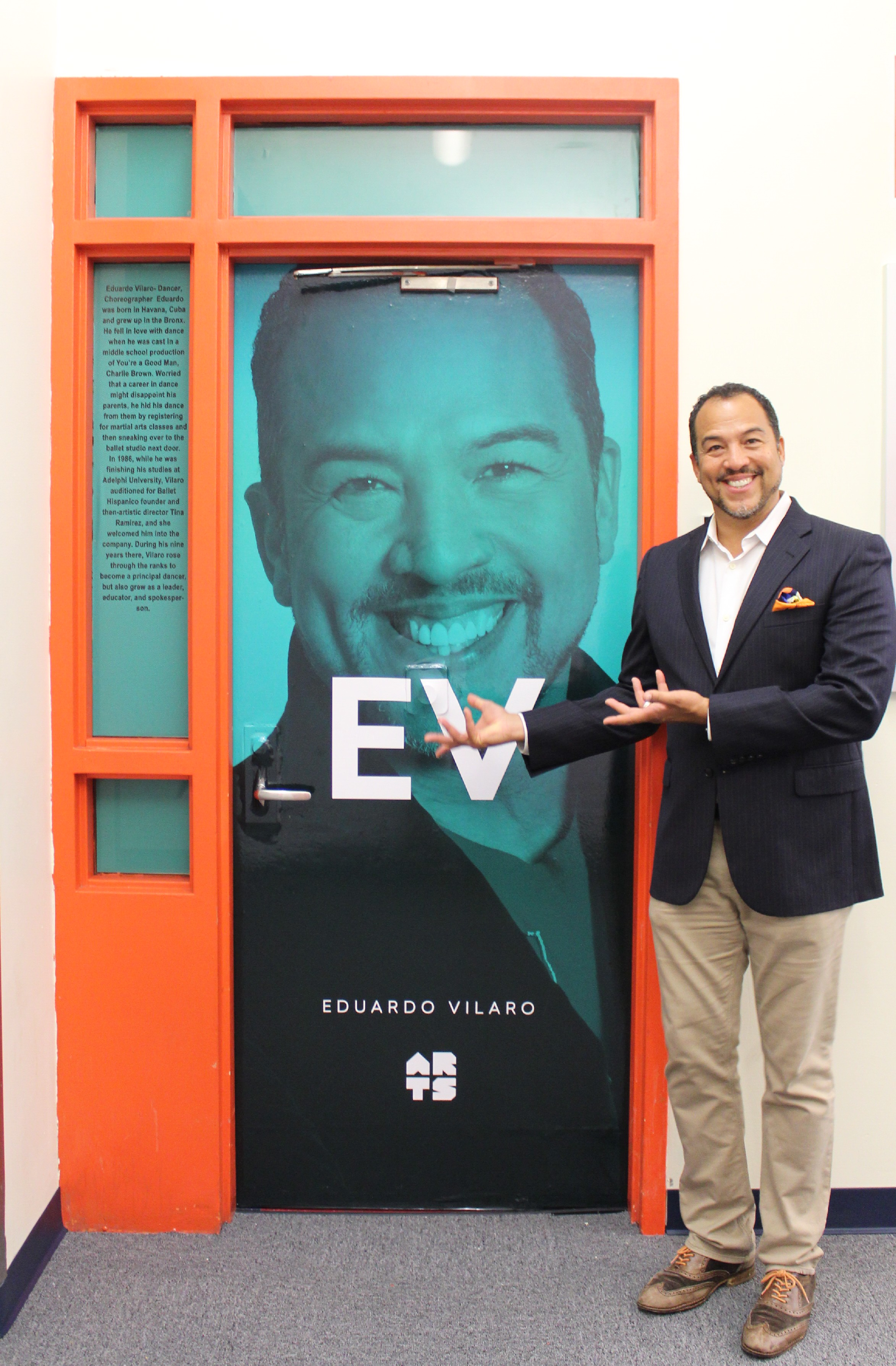
Eduardo Vilaro at the Bronx Arts Middle School in 2018

As artistic director & CEO of Ballet Hispánico, Vilaro has used this platform to promote dance and Latino arts more broadly. His local arts advocacy activities have included participation in public awareness campaigns and other community forums, such as #CelebrateImmigrants and New Yorkers for Dance. He has also served on grants panels for the National Endowment for the Arts and the New York State Council on the Arts; advised arts organizations as a member of the advisory board of Dance/NYC and a board member of Dance/USA; undertaken speaking engagements in venues such as the Salzburg Global Seminar’s Young Cultural Innovators Forum and the National Association of Latino Arts and Culture; and served as an arts/dance spokesperson and community leader addressing the growing need for cultural diversity and dance education. Vilaro sees the arts as “a necessity,” and arts advocacy as “everyone’s responsibility.”

== Philosophy ==
Vilaro’s philosophy of dance stems from a basic belief in the power of the arts to change lives, reflect and impact culture, and strengthen community. He considers dance to be a liberating, non-verbal language through which students, dancers, and audiences can initiate an ongoing conversation about the arts, expression, identity, and the meaning of community. In addition, Vilaro acknowledges the deep connections and contradictions inherent in Latin American history which derive from indigenous, European, and African sources and play out against a legacy of colonization, immigration, assimilation, globalization, and current hybrid identities (a phenomenon he refers to as “the identity mambo”). Addressing these factors, Vilaro has said, “For me, culture and the cultural dialogue is about inclusion. I want to make everyone feel that they can come in and be a little Latino. Ultimately, my goal is to expose [our audiences and communities] to the variety, diversity, and intersectionality of this diaspora.”

== Influences ==
Vilaro cites the mentorship of his early teachers and Ballet Hispánico’s founder and first artistic director Tina Ramirez as seminal influences in his dance education. Choreographic influences include Alvin Ailey, Martha Graham, Nacho Duato, and Pina Bausch. In addition, he has found inspiration in dance forms beyond the realm of the standard canon, such as the Eighties New York dance scene where gay culture and voguing thrived; the break-dancing and street performances that originated in his home borough of the Bronx; and Afro-Caribbean music, dance parties, and capoeira classes that defined his childhood and teen years. Finally, Vilaro has often turned to theater, opera, music, visual arts, literature (some of his works include spoken text), even nature and wildlife as creative springboards.

== Personal life ==
Vilaro lives in Irvington, NY with his husband, David Norfleet-Vilaro, and their son, Maximiliano.

== Honors and awards ==
- 2018: Dance namesake, Bronx Arts Middle School.
- 2017: Arts and Culture Pioneer of the Year, Hombre (magazine).
- 2016: Induction into the Bronx Walk of Fame, Bronx Borough President Rubén Díaz, Jr., The South Bronx Overall Economic Development Corporation and The Bronx Tourism Council.
- 2015: Arts Westchester “50 for 50” Recipient.
- 2003: Honored for choreographic work at Panama’s II International Festival of Ballet.
- 2001: Ruth Page Award for Choreography, Ruth Page Center for the Arts, Chicago, IL.

== Selected Choreography ==
For Ballet Hispánico:

- Asuka, 2011.
- Danzón, 2013.
- Hogar, 2014.

For Luna Negra Dance Theater:

- Amor y Dolor, 1999.
- Ognat, 2000.
- Breath in Memory, 2001.
- Late…after Siesta, 2001.
- Guaci Guari, 2001.
- Vuelo del Alma, 2002.
- Tiburónes, 2002.
- Mujer Llorando, 2003.
- Angelitos Negros, 2004.
- Imperfect Partners, 2004.
- Cantos para un Noche Viajera, 2004.
- Vidrio, 2004.
- Quinceañera, 2005.
- Mi Corazon Negro, 2006.
- Cugat, 2007.
- Danzón, 2007.
- Deshar Alhat, 2008.
- Ton Ton, 2008.
- Bossa Nova, 2009.
