= Taekwondo at the 2015 Pan American Games – Women's 57 kg =

Taekwondo – Women's 57 kg at the 2015 Pan American Games
- Venue: Mississauga Sports Centre
- Dates: July 20
- Competitors: 15 from 15 nations

Medalists
Gold medal	Cheyenne Lewis	United States
Silver medal	Paulina Armeria	Mexico
Bronze medal	Doris Patiño	Colombia
Bronze medal	Yamicel Nunez	Cuba

The women's 57 kg competition of the taekwondo events at the 2015 Pan American Games took place on July 20 at the Mississauga Sports Centre in Mississauga, Ontario, Canada. The defending Pan American Games champion was Irma Contreras of Mexico.

== Qualification ==
Most athletes qualified through the qualification tournament held in March 2015 in Mexico, while host nation Canada was permitted to enter one athlete. Two athletes from El Salvador and Uruguay later received wildcards to compete in this event.

== Schedule ==
All times are Eastern Daylight Time (UTC-4).

Date	Time	Round
July 20, 2015	14:05	Preliminaries
July 20, 2015	15:20	Quarterfinals
July 20, 2015	16:50	Semifinals
July 20, 2015	20:05	Repechage
July 20, 2015	20:35	Bronze medal matches/Final

== Results ==
=== Main bracket ===
The final results were:

Preliminary round
Coralia Abadia (GUA)	0
Yamicel Nunez (CUB)	12
Doris Patiño (COL)	13
Adriana Martinez (VEN)	12
Danna Poggio (URU)	DSQ
Josiane De Oliveira (BRA)
Carolena Carstens (PAN)	2
Celina Proffen (ARG)	3
Paulina Armeria (MEX)	3
Vanessa Vazquez (ESA)	2
Belen Costa (PER)	4
Maria Jara Correa (CHI)	7
Disnansi Polanco (DOM)	1
Evelyn Gonda (CAN)	13

Quarter-finals
Cheyenne Lewis (USA)	8
Yamicel Nunez (CUB)	6
Doris Patiño (COL)	4
Josiane De Oliveira (BRA)	0
Celina Proffen (ARG)	1
Paulina Armeria (MEX)	2
Maria Jara Correa (CHI)	4
Evelyn Gonda (CAN)	16

Semi-finals
Cheyenne Lewis (USA)	8
Doris Patiño (COL)	2
Paulina Armeria (MEX)	10
Evelyn Gonda (CAN)	6

Gold medal match
Cheyenne Lewis (USA)	11
Paulina Armeria (MEX)	0

=== Repechage ===
Semifinal			Bronze medal match
			1	Doris Patiño (COL)	2
2	Celina Proffen (ARG)	5		Celina Proffen (ARG)	1
3	Vanessa Vazquez (ESA)	1

Bronze medal match
Yamicel Nunez (CUB)	10
Evelyn Gonda (CAN)	3
