= Tina Ramirez =

American dancer (1929–2022)

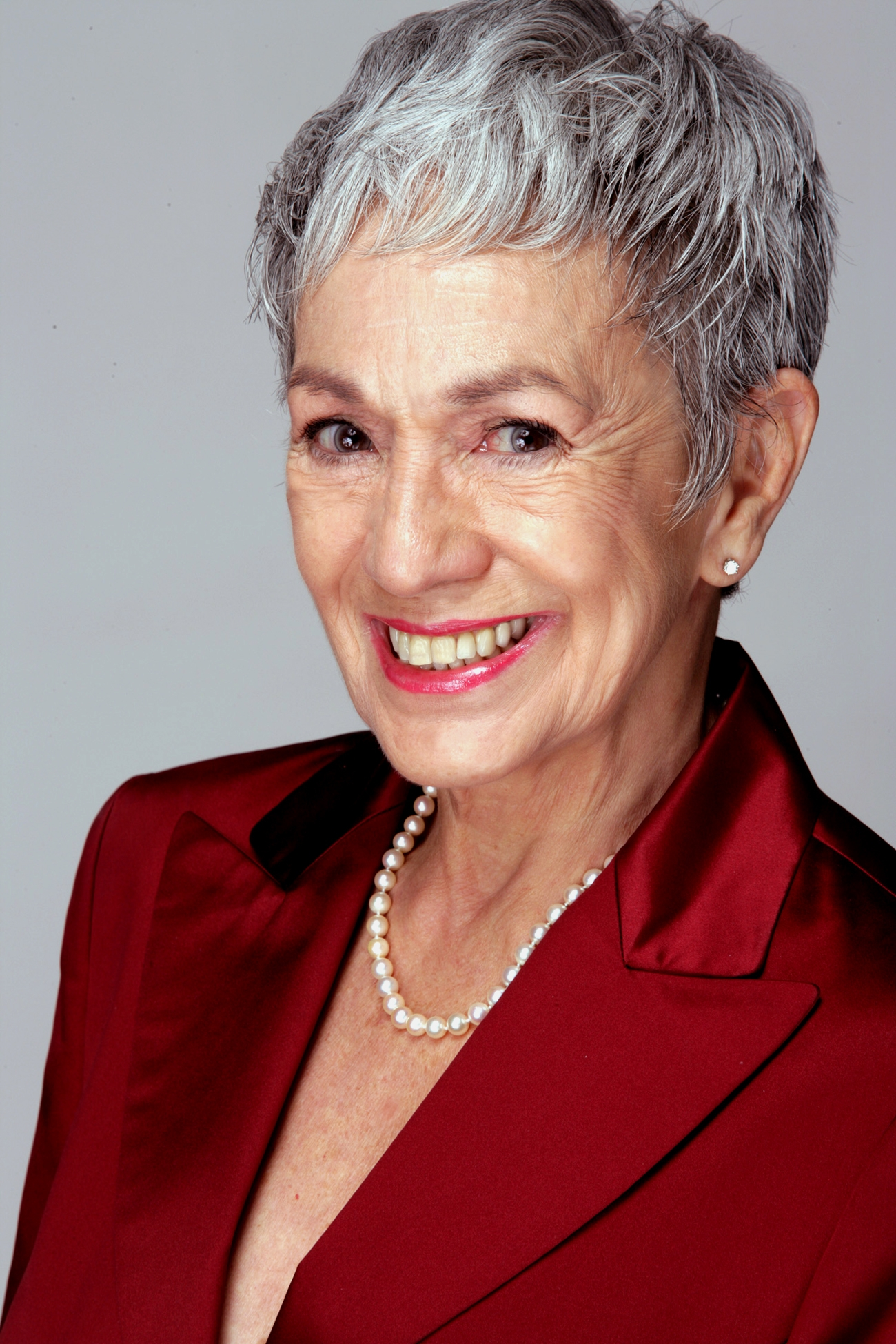
- Tina Ramirez in 2005
- Born: Ernestina Ramirez; November 7, 1929; Caracas, Venezuela
- Died: September 6, 2022 (aged 92); New York City, U.S.
- Occupations: Dancer; educator
- Known for: founding Ballet Hispanico
- Awards: National Medal of Arts (2005)

Ernestina Ramirez (November 7, 1929 – September 6, 2022) was an American dancer and educator, best known as the founder and artistic director (1970–2009) of Ballet Hispanico, the premier Latino dance organization in the United States.

== Biography ==
Ramirez was born in Caracas, Venezuela, in 1929, where her father, the Mexican bullfighter Jose Ramirez, known as Gaonita, was appearing. Her mother, Gloria Cestero, was the daughter of a politically active Puerto Rican family and subsequently became a leader in the Puerto Rican immigrant community in New York City. Ramirez moved to New York City at the age of six or seven. As a young dance student, at a time when the worlds of ballet, modern dance, and ethnic dance were largely separate, she trained rigorously in all three, studying Spanish dance with Lola Bravo and Luisa Pericet, classical ballet with Chester Hale and Alexandra Danilova, and modern dance with Anna Sokolow. Her professional performing career included tours with the Federico Rey Dance Company, the Xavier Cugat Orchestra, solo engagements in Spain, the inaugural Festival of Two Worlds in Spoleto, Italy with John Butler's company, the Broadway productions of Copper and Brass (in a number choreographed by Bob Fosse), Kismet and Lute Song, and the television adaptation of Man of La Mancha.

In 1963, Ramirez fulfilled a promise to take over Miss Bravo's studio upon her retirement. In 1967, with federal funding through an anti-poverty program, she conceived and directed an intensive training program for younger students called "Operation High Hopes." In addition to teaching, Ramirez arranged performances for her young students. While she demanded professional behavior of them, she was aware that there were few opportunities for Latinos in professional dance at the time. Encouraged by the growing skill of her pupils and increasing requests for performances, Ramirez formally established Ballet Hispanico in 1970 to include a company, a school, and educational programs. She died in New York City on September 6, 2022, at the age of 92.

=== Artistic Director ===
Ramirez' vision for the Ballet Hispanico Company gave contemporary Hispanic culture its place in American dance, much as Alvin Ailey did for the Black community. During her 39 years as Artistic Director, she invited 50 choreographers from diverse backgrounds to provide a modern-day interpretation of Spanish-speaking cultures, drawing on the versatility of her dancers in ballet, modern dance, jazz, ethnic and other dance techniques. World-renowned artists responded to her vision, including ballet artists Vicente Nebrada and Alberto Alonso; Talley Beatty and Anna Sokolow from modern dance; Paco Fernandez and Jose Coronado from ethnic dance; and Graciela Daniele and Ann Reinking from Broadway. "More than most artistic directors, she has consistently given exposure to fresh talent," nurturing artists early in their careers, including William Whitener, former Artistic Director of Kansas City Ballet; MacArthur Award-Winner Susan Marshall; Ramon Oller, head of Spain's Metros Danza; and Pedro Ruiz, then a member of the Company, now an independent choreographer.

For each of the 75 new works she commissioned for the Company (she also acquired 12 works, provided workshops for four and choreographed four), Ramirez provided top production values, regularly receiving acclaim for sets, costumes and lighting designs provided by such award-winning talents as Eugene Lee, Patricia Zipprodt, Willa Kim, Roger Morgan, and Donald Holder.

During her tenure, Ballet Hispanico performed for over two million people across three continents. The Company's national tours included engagements at such major venues as The John F. Kennedy Center in Washington, DC, the Music Center in Los Angeles, The Wortham Center in Houston, Boston's Celebrity Series, and Jacob's Pillow. In 1983, the Company was one of the first to appear at The Joyce Theater, and has since regularly presented its New York season there. The Company represented the United States at Expo '92 in Seville, Spain, where it was featured at a special Independence Day Celebration at the United States Pavilion. While on a three-week tour of South America in 1993, Ramirez and the dancers were honored guests at a private reception with President Carlos Menem. The Company's television appearances included "CBS Sunday Morning" with Charles Osgood in 1995 and CBS "The Early Show" in 2008.

=== Educator ===
Ramirez' "contribution as an educator is in many ways as important as her legacy as an artist and director." The Ballet Hispanico School of Dance employs Ramirez' original core curriculum of ballet, modern, and Spanish dance techniques - a singular practice among America's dance training institutions. The School has grown to train hundreds of students year-round. To ensure access for children of all backgrounds, the School provides scholarship support, which has grown to over $100,000 per year.

In addition to performing with Ballet Hispanico's own company, alumni trained at the school have gone on to significant careers, including Linda Celeste Sims, a leading dancer with the Ailey Company; Kimberly Braylock, a member of the San Francisco Ballet; Nancy and Rachel Ticotin in film, television and Broadway; Michael DeLorenzo in film and television; Sara Erde, Spanish dance artist at the Metropolitan Opera; and Nelida Tirado, featured Spanish dancer with the international tour of Riverdance. Leelee Sobieski and Jennifer Lopez also took their earliest dance classes at the School.

A number of alumni are now artistic directors in their own right, including Damaris Ferrer, founder and artistic director of Bailes Ferrer; solo flamenco artist Sandra Rivera; and Nelida Tirado, who was featured in Dance Magazine's "25 to Watch" in 2007. Former company member Eduardo Vilaro was founder and artistic director of Luna Negra Dance Theater before taking the reins as artistic director at Ballet Hispanico when Ramirez stepped down.

Ramirez drew on the resources of the company and school to create Ballet Hispanico's innovative educational program, Primeros Pasos ("First Steps"), which provides public schools with custom-tailored units of study in dance and Hispanic culture and offers a broad range of other educational activities for the public. This wide-ranging initiative regularly reaches 15,000 students and adults in New York City and across the nation.

== Recognition ==
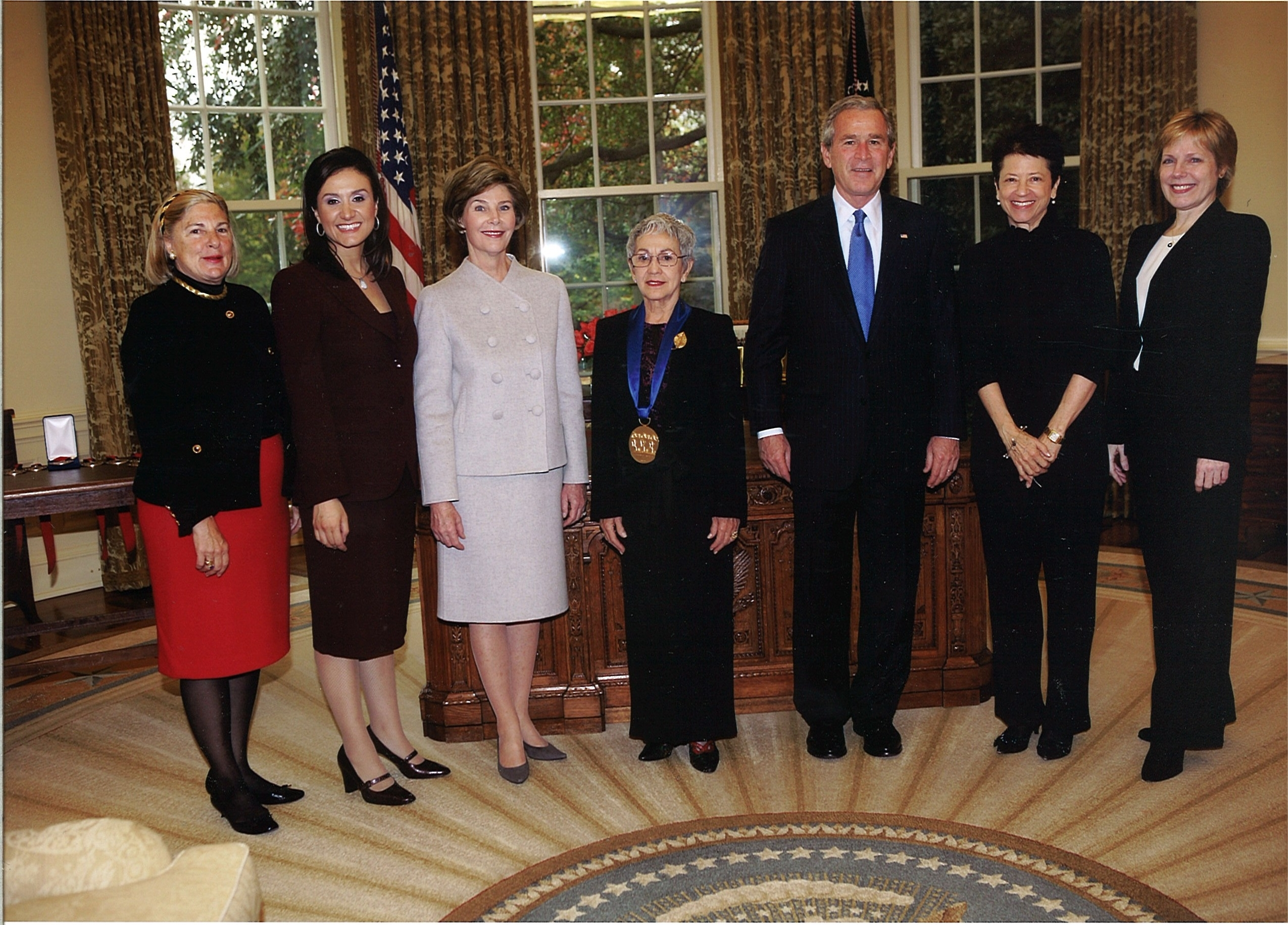
Receiving the National Medal of Arts from President Bush in 2005

Ramirez' enduring contributions to the field of dance earned her the National Medal of Arts, the nation's highest cultural honor, in 2005. Juilliard awarded her an honorary degree, Doctor of Fine Arts, in 2018. She received the Honor Award from Dance/USA in 2009 and the Award of Merit from the Association of Performing Arts Presenters in 2007. In 2004, AARP Magazine cited Ramirez as "a cultural trailblazer" and chose her as one of its ten "People of the Year." She received the Dance Magazine Award in 2002. Ramirez was named a Latina of the Year by Latina Magazine in 2000. In 1999, she received an Hispanic Heritage Award, presented at a gala celebration at The Kennedy Center. Among her other honors are a Citation of Honor at the 1995 New York Dance and Performance Awards (the "Bessies"), a special tribute at the Capezio Dance Awards in 1992, the NYS Governor's Arts Award (1987), the NYC Mayor's Award of Honor for Arts and Culture (1983), and the Manhattan Borough President's Award (1988). She was honored by the National Puerto Rican Forum at their 25th Anniversary Dinner.

Ramirez has served on the boards of The New 42nd Street, the Association of Hispanic Arts, and Dance Theatre Workshop. She was co-chair for the NYC Department of Education Dance Curriculum Blueprint Committee; she has also served on numerous panels, including the National Endowment for the Arts, the New York State Council on the Arts, and The Rockefeller Foundation's Choreographers Awards.
