= Ballet Hispanico =

American dance company

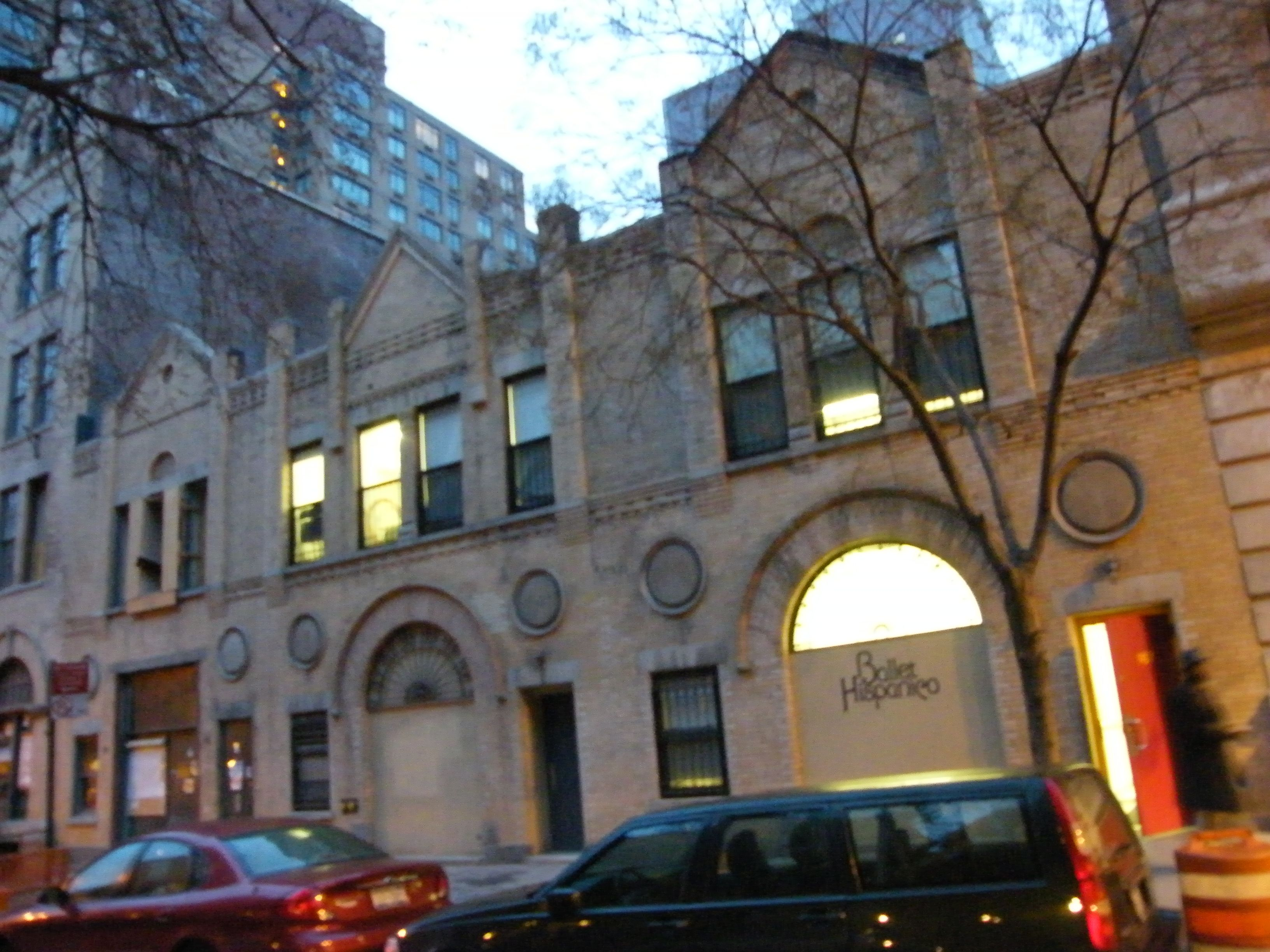
The space is in the former Claremont Riding Academy stables on West 89th Street that is on the National Register of Historic Places

Ballet Hispánico is an American dance company based in Manhattan, New York. It was founded by the Puerto Rican-Mexican-American dancer and choreographer Tina Ramirez in 1970 and presents dances reflecting the experience of Hispanic and Latino Americans.

The company has performed for more than two million people in the United States, Europe, and South America, and has a repertoire of over 75 works. The company has commissioned nearly 80 works and acquired 11 others, working with 45 choreographers from around the world.

== About ==
Tina Ramirez founded Ballet Hispánico in 1970. Daughter of a Mexican bullfighter and grand-niece of a Puerto Rican educator, Ramirez enjoyed a long professional dance career before establishing the organization. Its New York City headquarters includes six dance studios.

In August 2009, Eduardo Vilaro became the Ballet Hispánico Artistic Director. He is the second individual to lead the company since 1970. In 2015, he also took on the role of CEO. Vilaro was a former member of the Ballet Hispánico Company, serving as a dancer and educator for nine years starting in 1988. He stepped away in 1996 to found and lead Chicago’s Luna Negra Dance Theater for ten years before returning in 2009.

=== The Company ===
Ramirez' vision for the Ballet Hispánico Company promoted Hispanic culture in American dance. During her 39 years as Artistic Director, she invited 50 choreographers from diverse backgrounds to provide a modern-day interpretation of Spanish-speaking cultures, drawing on the versatility of her dancers in ballet, modern dance, jazz, ethnic and other dance techniques. World-renowned artists responded to her vision, including ballet artists as Vicente Nebrada and Alberto Alonso; Talley Beatty and Anna Sokolow from modern dance; Paco Fernandez and Jose Coronado from ethnic dance; and Graciela Daniele and Ann Reinking from Broadway. "More than most artistic directors, she has consistently given exposure to fresh talent," nurturing artists early in their careers, including William Whitener, now Artistic Director of Kansas City Ballet; MacArthur Award-Winner Susan Marshall; Ramon Oller, head of Spain's Metros Danza; and Pedro Ruiz, then a member of the Company, now an independent choreographer.

=== School of Dance ===
The School of Dance offers a curriculum including flamenco, Hip-Hop, Latin Rhythms, Salsa, Jazz, Tap, Afro-Caribbean, ballet, and contemporary techniques. The school also offers courses styled after notable individuals' dance styles. These include techniques based on the styles of Martha Graham, Katherine Dunham, and José Limón. The School offers pre-professional training, a general program, and classes for preschoolers and adults.

== Location ==
In 1983, Ballet Hispánico purchased two carriage houses adjacent to the former Claremont Riding Academy building on West 89th Street listed on the National Register of Historic Places. The structures were built to designs by architect Frank A. Rooke in 1892. With architects Buck/Cane, Ballet Hispánico converted the two carriage houses into the company's headquarters in 1989. A subsequent expansion in 2006 doubled the capacity of the organization's facilities.
