= Luna Negra Dance Theater =

American Latin dance ensemble

Luna Negra Dance Theater was an American dance ensemble that celebrated Latino culture through the creation of works by contemporary Latino choreographers.

== Company ==
Founded by Cuban-born dancer and choreographer Eduardo Vilaro, the company steered away from folkloric representations and utilized a variety of dance form styles such as tlamenco, tango, or salsa with contemporary dance movement.

Luna Negra made its home in Chicago at the Harris Theater in Millennium Park, and toured nationally and internationally.

It focused on the work of Latin choreographers such as Ron DeJesus, Vicente Nebrada, Gustavo Ramirez Sansano, and Annabelle Lopez Ochoa. The company performed in Chicago at Ravinia Festival, The Harris Theater for Music and Dance, Symphony Center, The Dance Center of Columbia College, Dance Chicago, the Ruth Page Dance Series locally and had toured nationally and internationally to places such as Spain, Panama, and Mexico. The dance ensemble made its New York City debut at the New Victory Theater in January 2008. In the community, Luna Negra offered intensive, hands-on education programs that encouraged discovery and exploration of personal and community identity.

When the Harris Theater opened in 2003, it provided an aspiration for small dance companies such as Luna Negra. Luna Negra quickly achieved its goal of performing there, and it celebrated its tenth season at the Harris Theater in September 2008. In past seasons, it cohabitated with the Joffrey Ballet, Hubbard Street Dance Chicago, and Concert Dance Inc. at Ravinia Festival. The company also performed on the schedule at Ravinia without these other Chicago dance companies. In its summer 2008 season, Luna Negra was the opening performance for Ravinia Festival.

In 2010, Luna Negra welcomed Gustavo Ramirez Sansano as its second artistic director.

In 2013, Luna Negra ceased operations due to financial stress.
