= Zhandra Rodríguez =

Venezuelan prima ballerina (born 1947)

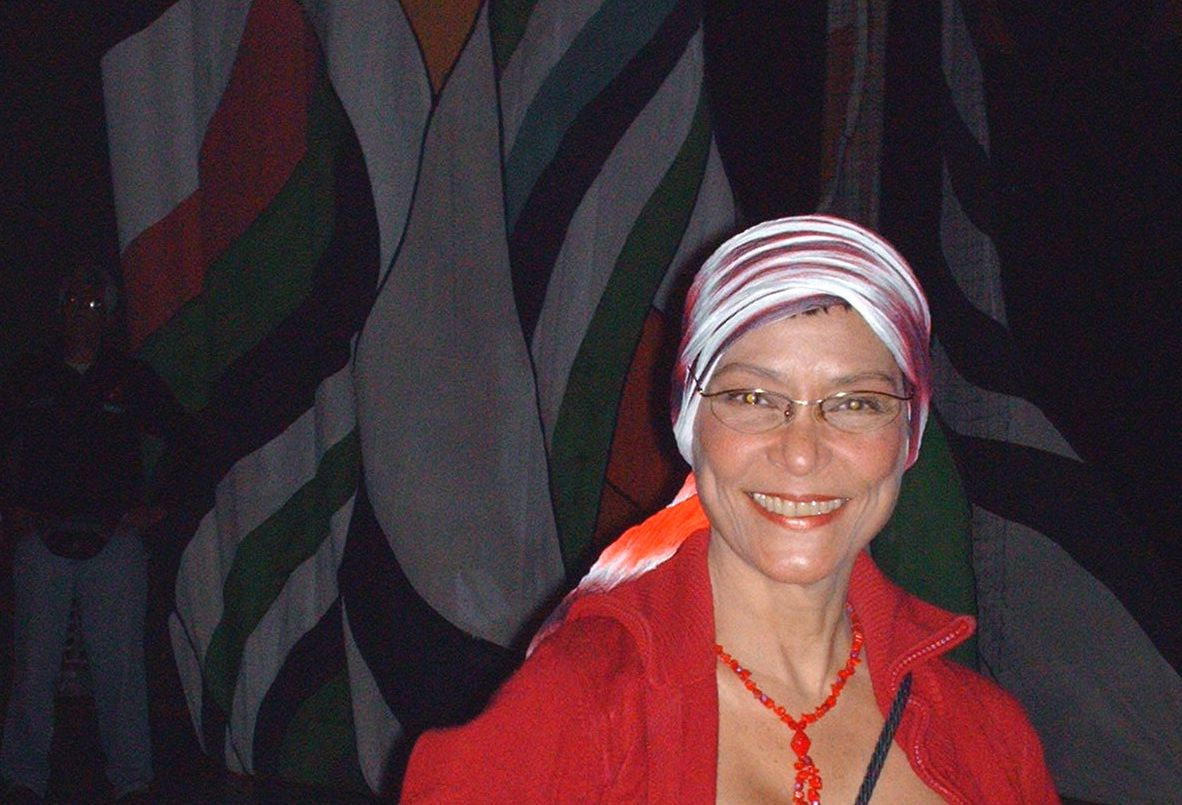
- Rodríguez in 2010
- Born: March 17, 1947 (age 79); Caracas, Venezuela
- Occupations: Dancer, choreographer
- Awards: Premio Nacional de Danza
- Website: zhandratustra.blogspot.com

Zhandra Rodríguez (born 17 March 1947) is a Venezuelan ballet dancer, choreographer, founder of the Caracas International Ballet, and founder and director of the New World Ballet of Caracas.

== Career ==
She was born in Caracas, Venezuela and began studying ballet aged five under Nena Coronil, and two years later she continued her training in the Interamerican Ballet Academy, directed by Margot Contreras.

When she was fifteen years old she became part of the National Ballet of Venezuela, directed by Irma Contreras. In a short time, due to her talent and effort, she became one of the prima ballerinas of that company. Rodríguez was impressed by a show of the American Ballet Theatre in Caracas and decided that this was the company with which she wanted to continue her professional career. She was accepted, and quickly became the principal dancer of the ABT. With the ABT, Rodríguez played almost all the main roles in the classic ballets of the company's repertoire.

While continuing her career with the American Ballet Theatre, she was invited to the Hamburg Ballet, directed by John Neumeier, to be Principal Dancer. She decided to leave the American Ballet Theatre to join the Hamburg company, where Neumeier created many choreographies especially for her, for which she was praised by critics and the German public. In 1974, she returned to Venezuela and founded the International Ballet of Caracas with Vicente Nebrada, María Cristina Anzola and Elías Pérez Borjas, a company that soon achieved great international prestige. From 1974 until 1980 she split her time between Caracas and Hamburg.

In 1980, accompanied by the dancer Mikhail Baryshnikov, she traveled through different cities of Brazil performing twenty functions with the pas de deux, El Corsario and Romeo and Juliet. In 1981 the International Ballet of Caracas disintegrates, and Rodríguez founded and directed, together with the American dancer Dale Talley, a new company: Ballet Nuevo Mundo de Caracas.

Her world tours, representing Venezuela, went to nearly every country. She was invited to dance the principal role with diverse ballet companies, such as, National Ballet of Cuba; Opera Ballet of Berlin; Opera Ballet of Vienna; Ballet del Teatro Colón de Buenos Aires; Ballet del Teatro Municipal de Rio de Janeiro; and Ballet de Santiago de Chile, among others, and with great dancers like Mikhail Baryshnikov; Paolo Bortolucci; Julio Bocca; Edward Villella; Jacques D'Ambrois; Fernando Bujones; John Clifford; Michael Denard; Ivan Nagy; and Anthony Dowell as her partners.

== Awards ==
- 1999: Premio Nacional de Danza
- 2014: Gran Cacique Guaicaipuro Prize in its first class
