= Taekwondo at the 2011 Pan American Games – Women's 57 kg =

Taekwondo – Women's 57 kg at the 2011 Pan American Games
- Venue: CODE II Gymnasium
- Dates: October 16
- Competitors: 13 from 13 nations

Medalists
Gold medal	Irma Contreras	Mexico
Silver medal	Doris Patiño	Colombia
Bronze medal	Nicole Palma	United States
Bronze medal	Yeny Contreras	Chile

The women's 57 kg competition of the taekwondo events at the 2011 Pan American Games took place on the 15 of October at the CODE II Gymnasium. The defending Pan American Games champion is Iridia Salazar of Mexico, while the defending Pan American Championship, champion is Rafael Araujo of Brazil.

== Schedule ==
All times are Central Standard Time (UTC-6).

Date	Time	Round
October 16, 2011	11:00	Preliminaries
October 16, 2011	12:30	Quarterfinals
October 16, 2011	17:00	Semifinals
October 16, 2011	18:00	Final

== Results ==
Legend

- PTG — Won by Points Gap
- SUP — Won by Superiority
- OT — Won on over time (Golden Point)

=== Main bracket ===
Preliminary round
Nicole Palma (USA)	8
Disnansi Polanco (DOM)	7
Katherinn Reyes (VEN)	2
Irma Contreras (MEX)	13
Nidia Muyoz (CUB)	12
Maude Dufor (CAN)	0
Yeni Contreras (CHI)	10
Elizabeth Alvarado (PER)	4
Debora Hait (ARG)	2
Emely Cartagena (PUR)	5

Quarterfinals
Laura Rivas (ESA)	4
Nicole Palma (USA)	9
Irma Contreras (MEX)	10
Nidia Muyoz (CUB)	8
Euda Carías (GUA)	1
Yeni Contreras (CHI)	5
Emely Cartagena (PUR)	2
Doris Patiño (COL)	3

Semifinals
Nicole Palma (USA)	7
Irma Contreras (MEX)	9
Yeni Contreras (CHI)	5
Doris Patiño (COL)	6

Gold medal match
Irma Contreras (MEX)	4
Doris Patiño (COL)	3
