= Doris Patiño =

Colombian taekwondo practitioner

Personal information
- Full name: Doris Esmid Patiño Marín
- Nickname: Xena
- Nationality: Colombia
- Born: 1 May 1986 (age 40) Sogamoso, Boyacá, Colombia
- Height: 1.65 m (5 ft 5 in)
- Weight: 54 kg (119 lb)

Sport
- Sport: Taekwondo
- Event: 57 kg
Medal record
Representing Colombia
Women's taekwondo
Pan American Games
Silver medal – second place	2011 Guadalajara	57 kg
Bronze medal – third place	2015 Toronto	57 kg
Central American and Caribbean Games
Gold medal – first place	2010 Mayagüez	57 kg

Doris Esmid Patiño Marín (born May 1, 1986, in Sogamoso, Boyacá) is a Colombian taekwondo practitioner. She won a silver medal for the 57 kg class at the 2011 Pan American Games in Guadalajara, Mexico, losing out to Mexico's Irma Contreras. She later followed that up with a bronze medal four years later at the 2015 Pan American Games in Toronto, Canada.

Patino qualified for the women's 57 kg class at the 2008 Summer Olympics in Beijing, after placing third from the Pan American Qualification Tournament in Cali, Colombia. She lost the first preliminary round match to Italy's Veronica Calabrese, who was able to score two points at the end of the game.

result	year	tournament	city	weight	category
PAR	2006	Pan American Championships	Buenos Aires	-55	senior
PAR	2007	Olympic Games qualification	World Manchester	-57	senior
bronze 3.	2007	Olympic Games qualification Pan America	Cali	-57	senior
PAR	2008	Olympic Games	Beijing	-57	senior
silver 2.	2008	Pan American Championships	Cagus	-55	senior
PAR	2009	World Championships	Kopenhagen	-57	senior
PAR	2011	Olympic Games qualification World	Baku	-57	senior
PAR	2011	Olympic Games qualification Pan America	Querétaro	-57	senior
bronze 3.	2012	Pan American Championships	Sucre	-57	senior
PAR	2013	World Championships	Puebla	-57	senior
PAR	2013	Grand Prix	Manchester	-57	senior
silver 2.	2014	Costa Rica Open	San Jose	-57	senior
bronze 3.	2014	Pan American Championships	Aguascalientes	-57	senior
bronze 3.	2014	Mexico Open	Aguascalientes	-57	senior
PAR	2014	Grand Prix	Manchester	-57	senior
bronze 3.	2015	Mexico Open	Aguascalientes	-57	senior
