= Susan Marshall (choreographer) =

American choreographer (born 1958)

Susan Marshall (born October 17, 1958) is an American choreographer and the Artistic Director of Susan Marshall & Company. She has held the position of Director of the Program in Dance at Princeton University since 2009.

== Career ==
=== Susan Marshall & Company ===
Susan Marshall & Company was formed in 1985 in New York City. Marshall worked initially with dancers Arthur Armijo, Andrew Boynton, Kathy Casey, David Dorfman, Jackie Goodrich, and Eileen Thomas, among others. Early venues included Emanu-El Midtown YM-YWHA and PS 122. The company then performed at Dance Theater Workshop in New York City for three seasons, from 1985 to 1987. The company began touring in 1987, and the next year Brooklyn Academy of Music commissioned Interior with Seven Figures for its Next Wave Festival, Marshall's first evening-length work.

The company has collaborated with Marshall on the creation and performance of works including Cloudless, Frame Dances, Play/Pause, Adamantine, The Most Dangerous Room in the House, Spectators at an Event, Fields of View, Arms, Interior with Seven Figures, and Kiss. Featured dancers in these and other works included Christopher Adams, Mark DeChiazza, Allison Easter, Heidi Michel Fokine, Kristen Hollinsworth, Krista Langberg, Luke Miller, Petra Van Noort, Joe Poulson, Andre Shoals, and Darrin Wright, among others.

An association with composer Philip Glass began in 1994 with Fields of View, and in 1996 she collaborated with him on his dance-opera Les Enfants Terribles.Her association with composer David Lang began with The Most Dangerous Room in the House in 1998.

Marshall, her artistic partners, and her company members have received 10 New York Dance and Performance Awards (BESSIES) for their work together. The company's work has been commissioned by Brooklyn Academy of Music (seven seasons), Peakperformances@Montclair, Jacob's Pillow Dance Festival, Dance Theater Workshop, Krannert Center for the Arts, Walker Center for the Arts, On the Boards, Hanscher Auditorium at University of Iowa among others. The company has performed at the Edinburgh International Festival, International Festival of Arts and Ideas in New Haven, the Festival International de Nouvelle Danse in Montreal, Spoleto Festival, the Los Angeles Festival, Vienna Tanz, SpringDanse (The Netherlands), and NY City Center Fall for Dance Festival. In addition to her work with her company, Marshall has also created dances for the Lyon Opera Ballet, the Frankfurt Ballet, the Boston Ballet, and Montreal Danse.

=== Selected Works for Susan Marshall & Company ===
- Arms (1984)
- Kiss (1987)
- Les Enfants Terribles (1996), a dance/opera created in collaboration with composer Philip Glass
- The Most Dangerous Room in the House (1998)
- Cloudless (2006), a collection of 18 dances
- Sawdust Palace (2007), a collection of 20 dances
- Adamantine (2009)
- Play/Pause (2013)
- Chromatic (2016)
- Two Person Operating System (2016)

=== Selected Other Works ===
- Asphalt Orchestra (2012, 2009, 2010), (choreography) Bang-on-a-Can’s avant-garde marching band
- Mikhail Baryshnikov: For You (2010)
- The Dancer (2010), three solos choreographed for a film conceived and directed by Judy Dennis, based on the iconic dancer created by Jules Feiffer
- Ballet Hispanico: Reverence (2008), Solo (1993)
- singing in the dead of night (2008), (choreographer, stage direction) music composed by David Lang, Julia Wolfe and Michael Gordon for the music ensemble Eighth Blackbird, Zankel Hall at Carnegie Hall
- Book of Longing (2007), a Philip Glass song cycle set to the poetry of Leonard Cohen, Rose Theater, Lincoln Center Festival
- Juilliard School: Working Memory (2004), Name by Name (2007)
- Montreal Danse: Lines from Memory (1995)
- Lyon Opera Ballet: Central Figure (1994)
- Frankfurt Ballet: In Medias Res (1989)
- Boston Ballet: Overture (1987)
- Groupe de Récherche Chorégraphique de l'Opéra de Paris (GRCOP): Gifts (1986)
- CoDanceCo: Ward (1983)

== Personal life ==
Marshall is the daughter of feminist writer and activist Beverly R. Jones, co-author of The Florida Paper, and behavioral scientist and activist Marshall B. Jones. She was raised in Florida and Pennsylvania. She lives with her husband, Christopher Renino, and son, Nicholas Renino.

== Awards and honors ==
- 2013: Reflection Grant from Krannert Center for the Performing Arts, University of Illinois at Urbana-Champaign.
- 2004, 2005, 2007, 2012, 2013 National Dance Project/New England Foundation for the Arts
- 2006: New York Dance and Performance Award (BESSIE) for Outstanding Choreographic Achievement for Cloudless
- 2002: New York Foundation for the Arts Fellowship
- 2000: MacArthur "Genius" Award
- 1997: New York Dance and Performance Award (BESSIE) for Outstanding Choreographic Achievement for Les Enfants Terribles
- 1995: Dance Magazine Award
- 1993: Brandeis University Creative Arts Citation
- 1990: Guggenheim Fellowship
- 1986: American Choreographer Award
- 1985: New York Foundation for the Arts Fellowship
- 1985-1992: National Endowment for the Arts Fellowships
- 1998 – 2014 National Endowment for the Arts Grants
- 1985: New York Dance and Performance Award (BESSIE) for Outstanding Choreographic Achievement for premier season at Dance Theater Workshop
