= Hubbard Street Dance Chicago =

Contemporary dance company in Chicago, US

Hubbard Street Dance Chicago is a contemporary dance company based in Chicago. Hubbard Street performs in downtown Chicago at the Harris Theater for Music and Dance and at the Edlis Neeson Theater at the Museum of Contemporary Art, Chicago. Hubbard Street also tours nationally and internationally throughout the year.

== History ==
Hubbard Street Dance Chicago grew out of the Lou Conte Dance Studio, when in 1977 several aspiring young artists approached dance teacher/choreographer Lou Conte to teach tap classes. At the time, the studio was located at the corner of LaSalle Street and Hubbard Street, which is how the company acquired its name. Conte served as director for 23 years, during which he developed relationships with choreographers including Lynne Taylor-Corbett, Margo Sappington, Daniel Ezralow, Nacho Duato, Jirí Kylián, and Twyla Tharp, all of whom helped shape Hubbard Street's repertoire.

In 2000, Jim Vincent became Artistic Director. Vincent worked to further expand the company's programming and repertoire. He introduced initiatives that have become staples of Hubbard Street's programming, including the "Inside/Out" Choreography Workshop, during which Hubbard Street dancers create original choreography for their peers; and the Choreographic Fellowship, which identifies and develops emerging choreographers from within the company. Dancers Alejandro Cerrudo and Robyn Mineko Williams, as well as Rehearsal Director Terence Marling have all developed works for the company. Dancer Penny Saunders choreographed a work for Hubbard Street 2 (the second company) through Hubbard Street's annual National Choreographic Competition.

In 2009, then Associate Artistic Director Glenn Edgerton became Artistic Director. Soon after, he named Alejandro Cerrudo Hubbard Street's first Resident Choreographer. Cerrudo has created ten works for the company. Since becoming Artistic Director, Edgerton has secured new commissions and repertoire hits by master and notable choreographers including Jirí Kylián, Nacho Duato, William Forsythe, Twyla Tharp, Ohad Naharin, Victor Quijada, Aszure Barton, and Sharon Eyal.

In 2021, former company dancer Linda-Denise Fisher-Harrell was named the fourth Artistic Director of Hubbard Street Dance Chicago. Season 44: RE/CHARGE marks her debut season as the artistic leader of the organization, with the goal of continuing to diversify the company’s repertoire and ensemble while building on the incredible legacy and reputation that HSDC has already established.

== Main company ==
Today, the main company consists of 14 dancers. While many contemporary dance companies are single-choreographer organizations, Hubbard Street has always been a repertory company, representing numerous choreographers and styles.

Hubbard Street has commissioned and presented almost 200 new and acquired dance works throughout its history.

=== Lou Conte Dance Studio ===
Under the direction of the late Claire Bataille, one of the original four Hubbard Street dancers, Lou Conte Dance Studio (LCDS) offered weekly classes in ballet, jazz, modern, tap, African, hip hop, African drums, musical theater, yoga, Pilates, and Zumba at all levels from basic to professional, as well as workshops and master classes. LCDS also maintained a scholarship program for advanced dancers. LCDS closed in the spring of 2020.

== Community partnerships ==
Since 2000, Hubbard Street has established partnerships with the Chicago Symphony Orchestra, presenting new and existing choreography set to orchestral music performed by the symphony; the Art Institute of Chicago; Illinois Institute of Technology School of Architecture; and Rush University Medical Center, which helped establish the Parkinson's Project, using contemporary dance techniques to improve the mobility and quality of life for participants.

== Dancers ==
=== Hubbard Street Dance Chicago ===
Source: Hubbard Street Dance Chicago

- Aaron Choate
- Abdiel Figueroa Reyes
- Alexandria Best
- Alysia Johnson
- Cyrie Topete
- David Schultz
- Elliot Hammans
- Jack Henderson
- Jacqueline Burnett
- Matt Wenckowski
- Michele Dooley
- Morgan Clune
- Shota Miyoshi
- Simone Stevens
