= Harris Theater (Chicago) =

Theater in Millennium Park, Chicago, Illinois, United States

Joan W. and Irving B. Harris Theater for Music and Dance
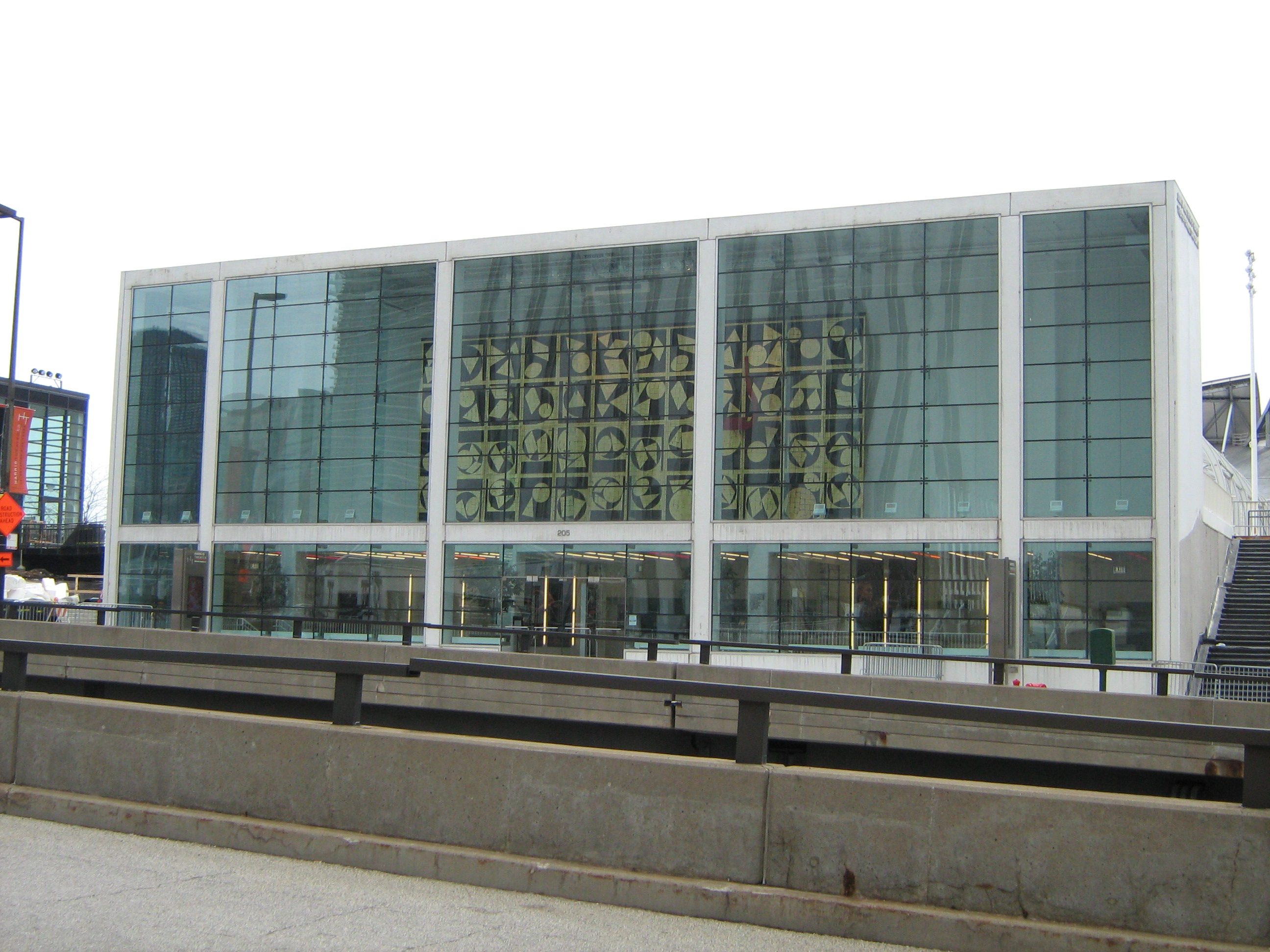
- Harris Theater viewed from across the street.

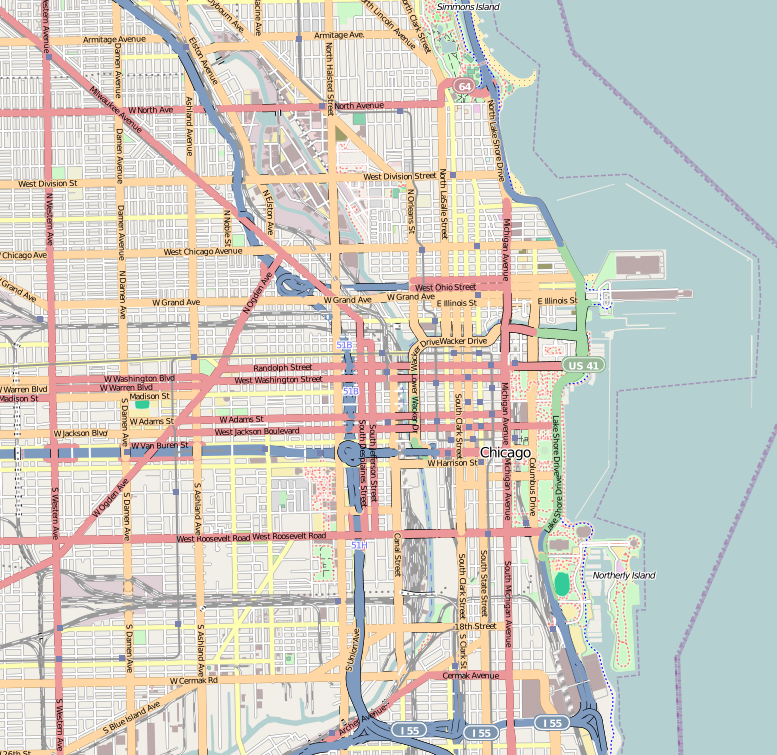
- Location (red dot) of the Joan W. and Irving B. Harris Theater for Music and Dance
- Address: 205 E. Randolph Street; Chicago, Illinois; United States
- Coordinates: 41°53′02″N 87°37′19″W
- Owner: City of Chicago
- Capacity: 1,499 (1,400 for some configurations)
- Current use: Music and Dance performance
- Parking: 2,218 (shared with Millennium Park)

Construction
- Opened: November 8, 2003
- Years active: 2003–present
- Architect: Hammond Beeby Rupert Ainge Architects

Website
- harristheaterchicago.org

The Joan W. and Irving B. Harris Theater for Music and Dance (also known as the Harris Theater for Music and Dance, the Harris & Harris Theater or, most commonly, the Harris Theater) is a 1,499-seat theater for the performing arts located along the northern edge of Millennium Park on Randolph Street in the Loop community area of Chicago in Cook County, Illinois, United States. The theater, which is largely underground due to Grant Park-related height restrictions, was named for its primary benefactors, Joan and Irving Harris. It serves as the park's indoor performing venue, a complement to Jay Pritzker Pavilion, which hosts the park's outdoor performances.

Constructed in 2002–2003, it provides a venue for small and medium-sized music and dance groups, which had previously been without a permanent home and were underserved by the city's performing venue options. Among the regularly featured local groups are Joffrey Ballet, Hubbard Street Dance Chicago, and Chicago Opera Theater. It provides subsidized rental, technical expertise, and marketing support for the companies using it, and turned a profit in its fourth fiscal year.

The Harris Theater has hosted notable national and international performers, such as the New York City Ballet's first visit to Chicago in over 25 years (in 2006). The theater began offering subscription series of traveling performers in its 2008–2009 fifth anniversary season. Performances through this series have included the San Francisco Ballet, Mikhail Baryshnikov, and Stephen Sondheim.

The theater has been credited as contributing to the performing arts renaissance in Chicago and has been favorably reviewed for its acoustics, sightlines, proscenium and for providing a home base for numerous performing organizations. Although it is seen as a high caliber venue for its music audiences, the theater is regarded as less than ideal for jazz groups because it is more expensive and larger than most places where jazz is performed. The design has been criticized for traffic flow problems, with an elevator bottleneck. However, the theater's prominent location and its underground design to preserve Millennium Park have been praised. Although there were complaints about high priced events in its early years, discounted ticket programs were introduced in the 2009–10 season.

== Background and construction ==
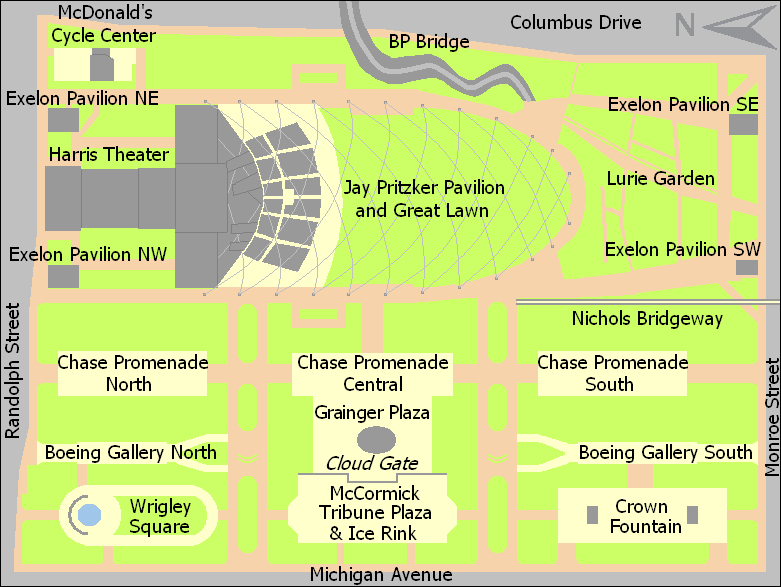
Image map of Millennium Park; east is at the top. Each feature or label is linked.

The Harris Theater was built to fill the need for a modern performance venue in downtown Chicago, which would be a new home for previously itinerant performing arts companies. Such troupes were never sure from year to year where they would be able to perform; for example, the Chicago Tribune reported in 1993 that six dance companies lost their performance space during renovations at the Civic Opera House. The need for a new theater was identified by the John D. and Catherine T. MacArthur Foundation in a 1990 study; the new venue had to be flexible, affordable, and technically and physically "state-of-the-art". Once the need was identified, the theater was the culmination of "years of planning by Chicago's philanthropic, arts, business and government leaders" including groups like Music of the Baroque, which now perform there regularly. The plan also extended Chicago's performing arts district, which had been predominantly west of Michigan Avenue, east towards Lake Michigan, and linked it more with the Museum Campus and Michigan Avenue cultural institutions.

The Harris Theater is in Grant Park, which lies between Lake Michigan to the east and the Loop to the west, and has been Chicago's front yard since the mid-19th century. Grant Park's northwest corner, north of Monroe Street and the Art Institute, east of Michigan Avenue, south of Randolph Street, and west of Columbus Drive, had been Illinois Central rail yards and parking lots until 1997, when it was made available for development by the city as Millennium Park. As of 2007, Millennium Park trails only Navy Pier as a Chicago tourist attraction.

In 1836, a year before Chicago was incorporated, the Board of Canal Commissioners held public auctions for the city's first lots. Foresighted citizens, who wanted the lakefront kept as public open space, convinced the commissioners to designate the land east of Michigan Avenue between Randolph Street and Park Row (11th Street) "Public Ground—A Common to Remain Forever Open, Clear and Free of Any Buildings, or Other Obstruction, whatever." Grant Park has been "forever open, clear and free" since, protected by legislation that has been affirmed by four previous Illinois Supreme Court rulings. In 1839, United States Secretary of War Joel Roberts Poinsett declared the land between Randolph Street and Madison Street east of Michigan Avenue "Public Ground forever to remain vacant of buildings".

Aaron Montgomery Ward, who is known both as the inventor of mail order and the protector of Grant Park, twice sued the city of Chicago to force it to remove buildings and structures from Grant Park and to keep it from building new ones. In 1890, arguing that Michigan Avenue property owners held easements on the park land, Ward commenced legal actions to keep the park free of new buildings. In 1900, the Illinois Supreme Court concluded that all landfill east of Michigan Avenue was subject to dedications and easements. In 1909, when he sought to prevent the construction of the Field Museum of Natural History in the center of the park, the courts affirmed his arguments. As a result, the city has what are termed the Montgomery Ward height restrictions on buildings and structures in Grant Park; structures over 40 feet (12 m) tall are not allowed in the park, with the exception of bandshells. Therefore, the theater is mostly underground, while the adjacent Jay Pritzker Pavilion was described as a work of art to dodge the height restriction.

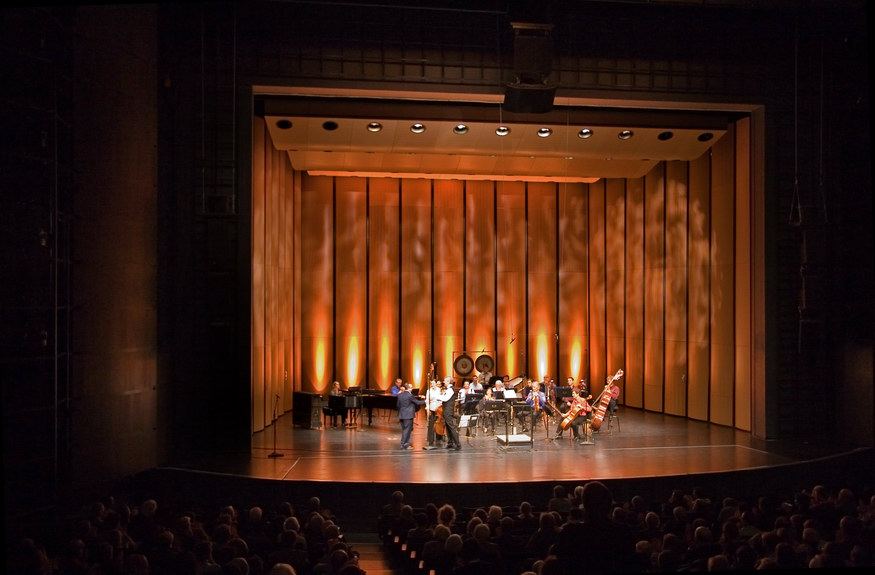
The staging area is 27 feet 4 inches (8.3 m) by 83 feet 8 inches (25.5 m).

The theater is named for its primary benefactors, Joan and Irving Harris, who gave a gift of $15 million gift ($26.9 million in 2025 dollars) and a $24 million ($43 million) construction loan to the Music and Dance Theater Chicago; this was believed to be largest single monetary commitment ever to a performing arts organization in Chicago. The Harrises had a long history of philanthropy benefitting the arts.

The Harris Theater was designed by Driehaus Prize winner Thomas Beeby of Hammond Beeby Rupert Ainge Architects; his previous work in Chicago includes the Harold Washington Library Center and the Art Institute of Chicago Building's Rice Wing. Thornton Tomasetti was the structural engineer. The building is located on ground leased from the City of Chicago, and cost $52.7 million ($92.2 million in 2025 dollars). Construction began on February 1, 2002, and the theater opened for use on November 8, 2003.

== Architecture ==
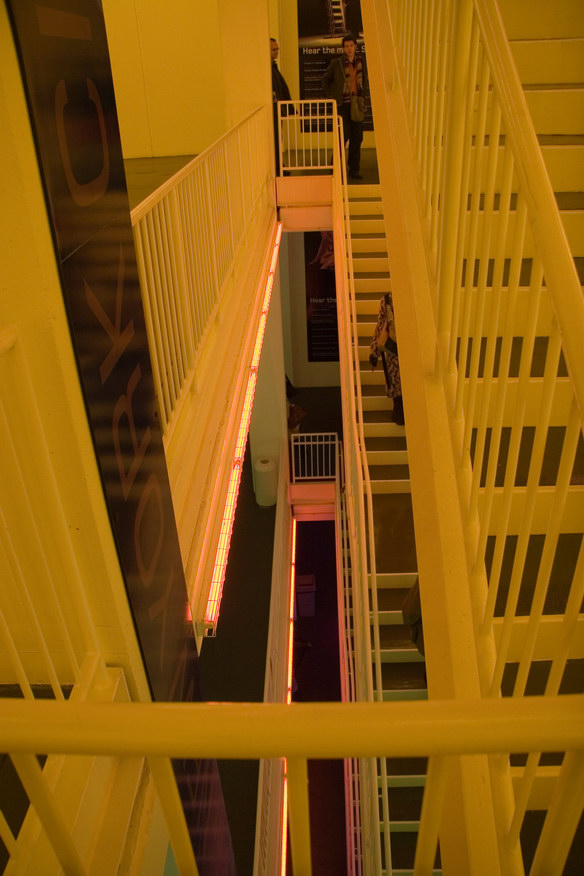
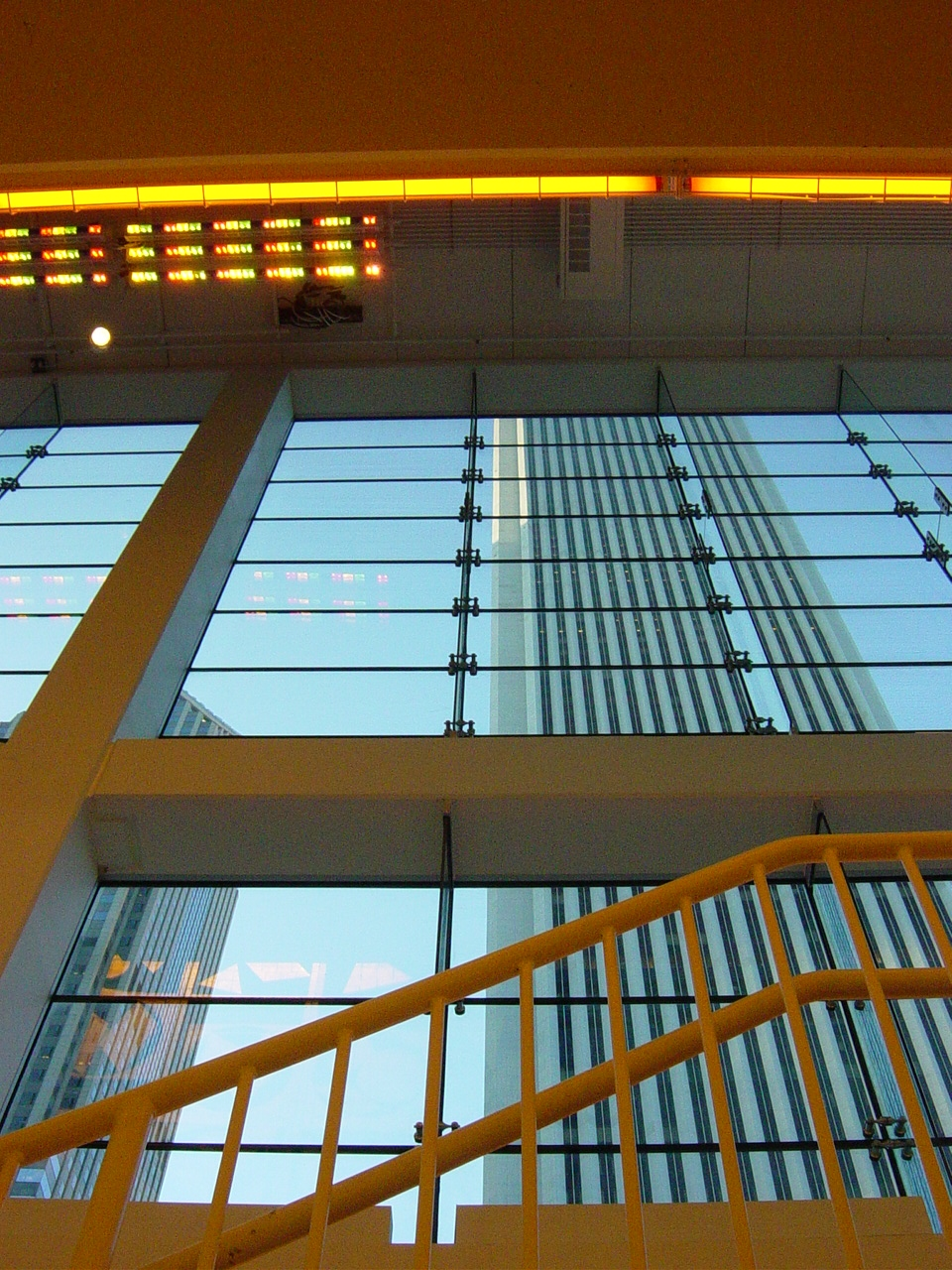
Left: lateral view of steps; Right: Aon Center from underground in the Harris Theater

The above-ground entrance to the Harris Theater is a glass-walled lobby at 205 E. Randolph Street, which spans several metallic and neon floors in what the Chicago Tribune's Pulitzer Prize-winning architecture critic Blair Kamin describes as "a multistory shaft of space that explodes downward from street level". The theater and adjacent Millennium Park Garage are located mostly underground, with a passage connecting them. Kamin also notes that the theater's underground design and the Millennium Park Garage entrance causes many theater goers to miss the spatial grandeur of the lobby, and has led to complaints about the time it takes to descend the many stairs to the theater. The theater has a rooftop terrace that is available for private events.

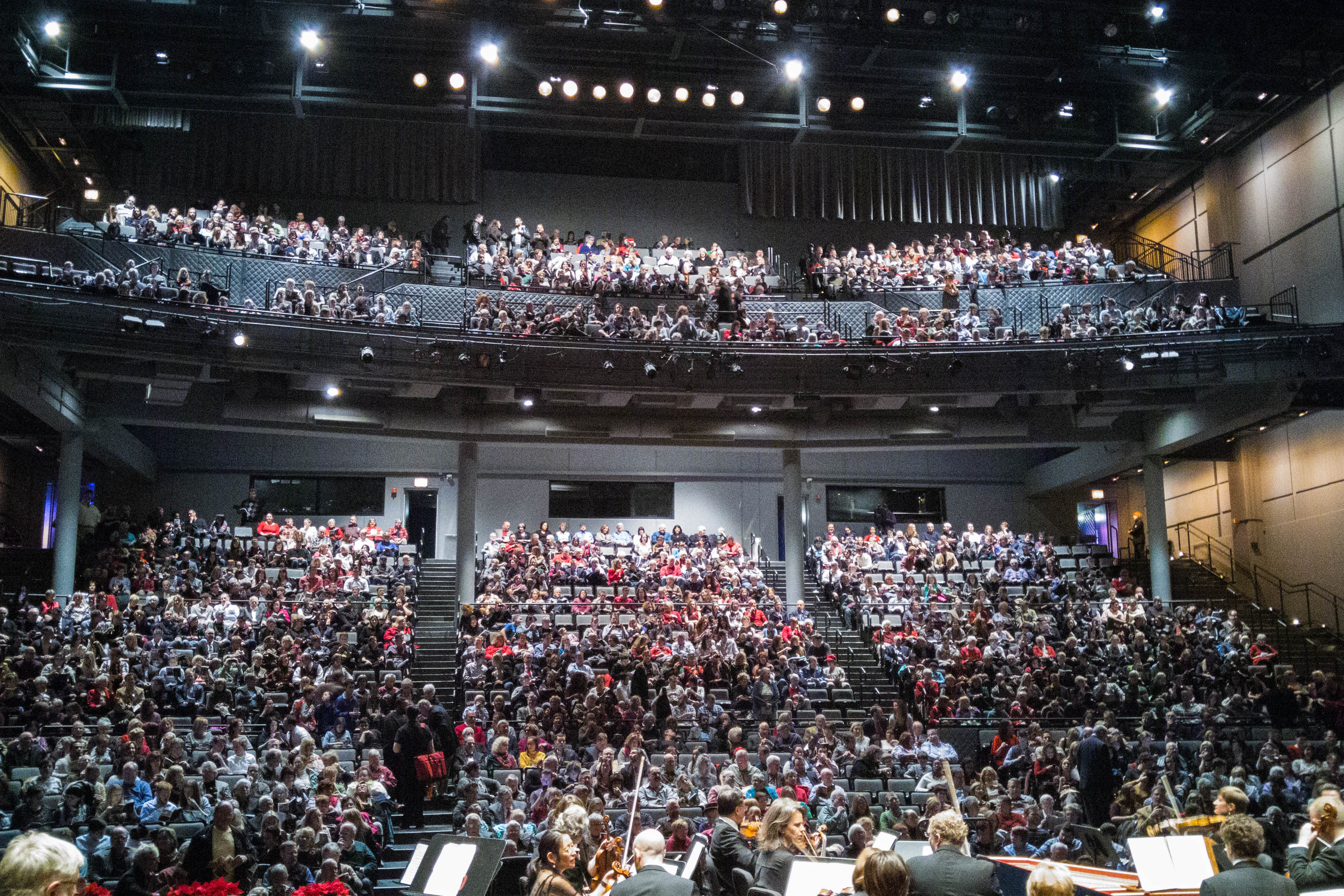
View from the stage with a full house

The Harris Theater is located beneath and directly north of the Jay Pritzker Pavilion, Millennium Park's outdoor performance venue. The theater and pavilion were built adjacent to each other at about the same time, with the benefit that they share a loading dock, rehearsal rooms and other backstage facilities. The entire auditorium is in a cube 100 feet (30.5 m) on a side, so all the seats are relatively close to the stage. The seating capacity is 1,499, with approximately 600 main floor seats, 500 raised orchestra level seats and 400 balcony seats. The modern orchestra pit, which can be closed, accommodates 45 musicians. The seats are maplewood; carpeting and walls have a muted color scheme—blacks, charcoals and grays. Kamin felt the modest palette is appropriate for a modest structure that attempts to complement the exuberant neighboring pavilion.

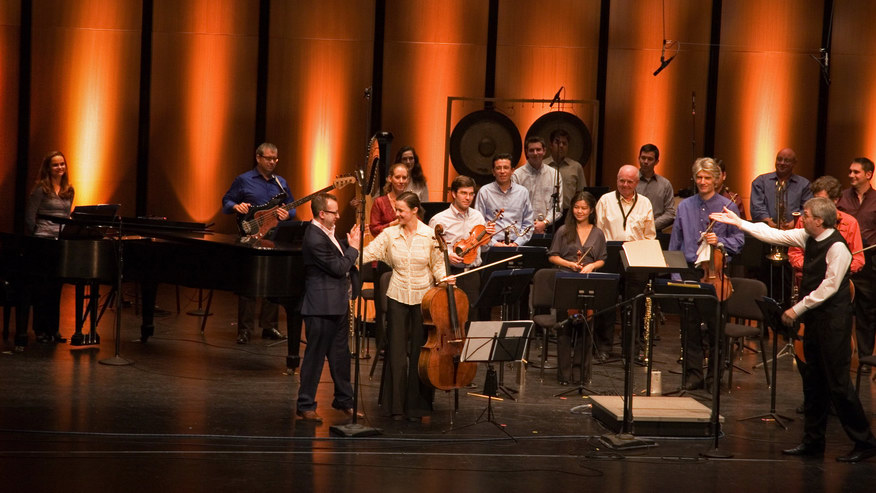
Performers on the Harris Theater's stage

The proscenium is 30 feet (9.1 m) high and is flanked by 75-foot (22.9 m) steel reflector towers to help focus sound. The stage is both 45 feet (13.7 m) wide and deep, with 75 feet (22.9 m) of flyspace above. The offstage right distance is 26 feet (7.9 m), while offstage left is 27 feet 10 inches (8.5 m). The theater's sightlines and acoustics provide "an unusually modern and stainless-steel bolstered environment" for experiencing performances according to the Centerstage City Guide.

The original design planned for most theater patrons to enter the theater from the underground parking garage, but the success of Millennium Park and neighboring businesses has caused most attendees to enter at street level. The design's limited elevator service has caused bottlenecks for street level patrons. Additional elevators and escalators, which would require special dedicated funding, have been considered. The initial construction leaked and did not protect some non-public spaces from water exposure; this cost Chicago taxpayers $1 million for repairs in 2008.

== Performers and events ==
Attendance	Music	Dance	Total
2003–04	30,397	33,830	64,227
2004–05	46,213	51,494	97,707
2005–06	33,681	40,520	74,201
2006–07	25,436	60,042	85,478
2007–08	33,957	35,230	69,187
Source: Chicago Tribune

The Harris Theater is a privately owned institution serving mostly local mid-size non-profit arts companies and projects, including those, like Old Town School of Folk Music, which sponsor touring artists. The theater provides subsidized rental, technical expertise, and marketing support, and underwrites over two-thirds of the daily usage costs for its non-profit users while providing marketing, box office, front of house, and technical services at no extra charge. As of 2008, the theater was used on average 262 days a year for 112 different performances with audiences at about 65 percent of capacity.

=== Local performers ===
When the Harris Theater opened, it served as the home venue for a dozen founding music and dance groups: Ballet Chicago, Chicago Opera Theater, Chicago Sinfonietta, The Dance Center of Columbia College Chicago, Hubbard Street Dance Chicago, Joffrey Ballet of Chicago, Lyric Opera Center for American Artists, Mexican Fine Arts Center Museum, Muntu Dance Theatre of Chicago, Music of the Baroque, Old Town School of Folk Music, and Performing Arts Chicago. After the 2003 opening, small dance companies aspired to perform in the state-of-the-art theater; one such troupe, Luna Negra Dance Theater, achieved its goal and performed there in 2006 and 2007.

In 2010, Frommer's noted that the major local dance troupes performing regularly at the theater included Columbia College Chicago, Hubbard Street, Joffrey, Muntu, and River North Dance Company. The 2009 edition of Fodor's cited Music of the Baroque's seven performances at the Harris Theater each year. The theater also hosts Grant Park Music Festival events that include a few free seats. According to the 2005 Frommer's Irreverent Guide to Chicago, by providing a regular performing venue, the Harris Theater has also "raised the profile of local dance groups" in Chicago.

The attempt to facilitate modest-sized performance groups has been recognized by philanthropists; both the Chicago-based John D. and Catherine T. MacArthur Foundation and the New York-based Andrew W. Mellon Foundation have provided grants to the theater. For example, in 2009 the MacArthur Foundation gave the theater $150,000 over three years "in support of a subsidized usage program for smaller arts organizations".

As of 2021, the Harris Theater Resident Companies comprises 25 organizations from the Apollo Chorus of Chicago to Roosevelt University's CCPA Symphony Orchestra.

=== Visiting performers ===
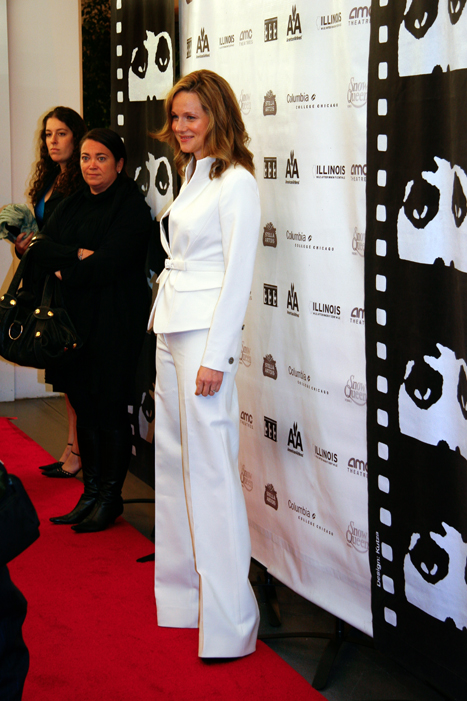
Laura Linney at the Chicago International Film Festival closing night at the Harris Theater, 2007

In the fall of the 2006–07 season, the Harris Theater hosted the New York City Ballet for five days of performances that marked the company's first visit to Chicago in over 25 years. This presentation grossed $2.3 million and enticed 600 new donors to support the theater, which netted $800,000 for operations and rental subsidies for its resident troupes. This contributed to the theater's first year of profitability in fiscal year 2007; it had net income of $1.3 million on revenues of $8.2 million. In July 2007, Mikhail Baryshnikov made his first visit to Chicago as a performer in seven years, with two shows at the theater.

The theater began to present its own music series of touring groups in its fifth season (2008–09), which put it in competition with the Chicago Symphony Orchestra's "Symphony Center Presents" series and Chicago's Auditorium Theatre. The "Harris Theater Presents" series was in addition to programs by its numerous resident performing arts groups. The theater's music series for the 2008–09 season included a five-concert classical music series and a three-performance dance series by the San Francisco Ballet and the Lar Lubovitch Dance Company. The San Francisco Ballet is America's oldest professional ballet troupe, and was on a widely publicized four-city 75th anniversary celebration tour. Many of the performers for the Harris Theater's first subscription series were internationally acclaimed artists.

The lineup for the Harris Theater's 2009–10 second subscription season included Mikhail Baryshnikov, Lang Lang, Kathleen Battle and Stephen Sondheim. Harris theater has been involved in hosting the Chicago International Film Festival. Prior to 2008, the Chicago Theatre had hosted the annual opening-night film of the festival, but that year the festivities were moved to the Harris Theater.

The theater has hosted several successful jazz performances, including Nicholas Payton's comeback and the first indoor Chicago show by the Portuguese fado singer Mariza. In 2005, the theater hosted the 14th annual Jazz Dance World Congress, and the following year it hosted "Imagine Tap!", a show that featured an array of tap dance styles.

== Reception ==
The Harris Theater has been the subject of numerous reviews, which are probably best summed up by the Chicago Tribune's architecture critic Blair Kamin, who describes it as a "solid, though not unqualified, success", while giving it a two star rating (out of a possible four). Among the foibles that he notes were the off-putting industrial aesthetics, mundane concrete-framing, under-refined modest palette and blunt entrance. However, Kamin praises the spacious lobby and the theater's underground design as a concession to preserve the green lakefront.

Kamin also praises the design of the proscenium and the venue's sightlines and acoustics, which also drew praise from Tribune journalist Howard Reich and Chicago Sun-Times journalist Wynne Delacoma. Reich, who notes that the theater has a wonderful stage, describes the theater as a blessing for both audiences and arts organizations because its high-profile confers "instant prominence and credibility to musicians and presenters". Reich feels it is a less than perfect jazz music venue because of its "cavernous" size and high rental cost ($4,750 in 2008, plus costs for stagehands). Nonetheless, Delacoma describes it as "an astonishingly beautiful place to listen to music. Its acoustics cradle sound like a velvet-lined jewel box."

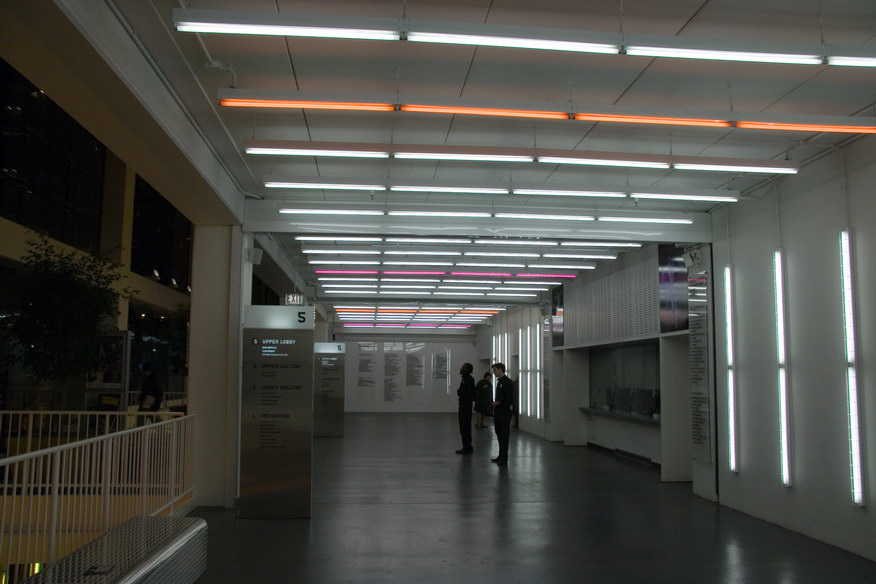
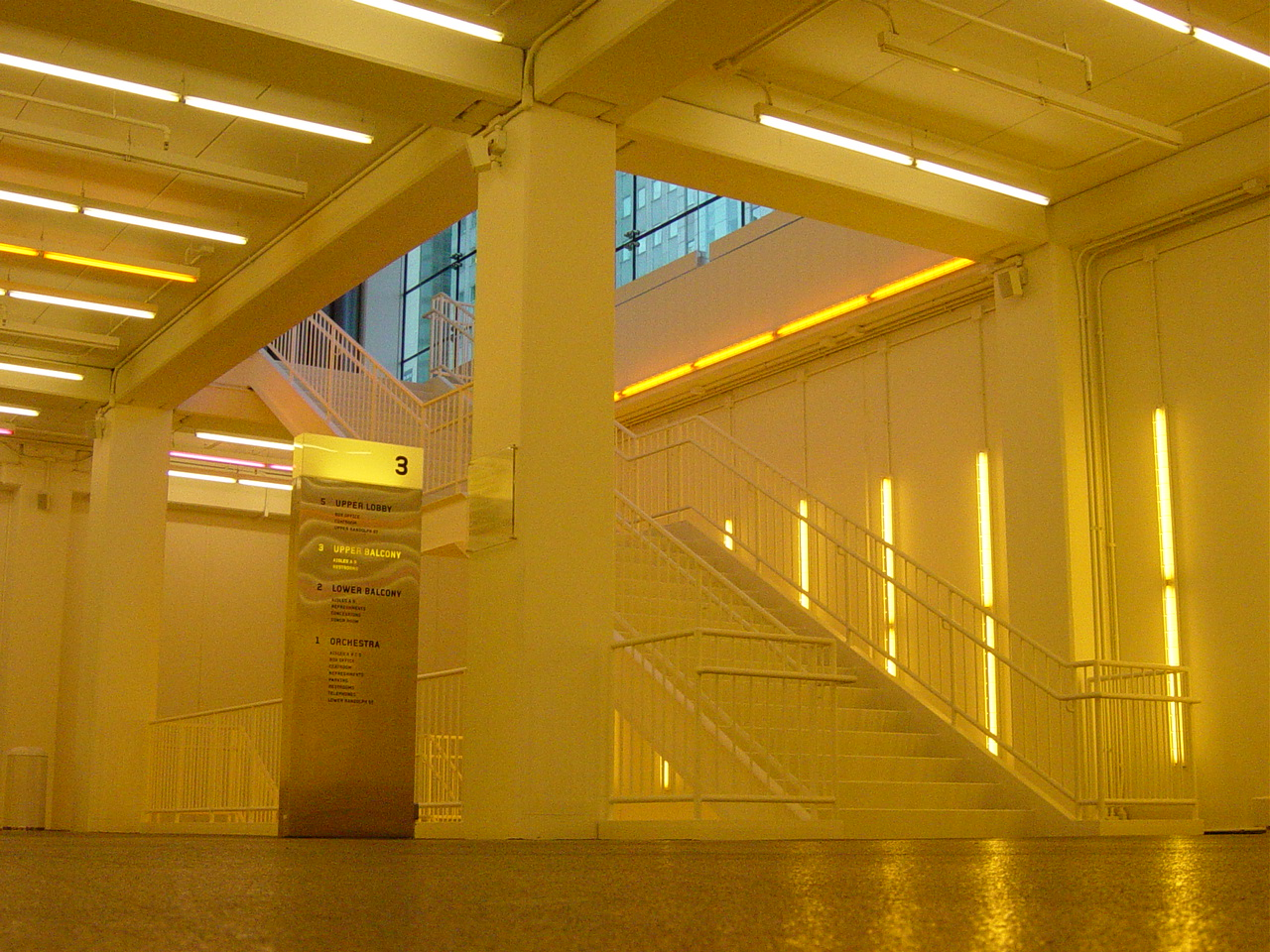
Architecture critic Blair Kamin has criticized the theater's industrial aesthetics and concrete-framing.

Tribune journalist Chris Jones credits the theater's founding as part of Chicago's performing arts renaissance, and praises it as "the only major Chicago arts building with a long-term commitment to equal partnerships" with its performance groups. Another Tribune journalist, John von Rhein, describes the theater as a boon to the performing groups that it serves, and praises it for being state-of-the-art. He also notes that because of the theater's success it is able "to present an increasing number of risky, sometimes boundary-busting events the likes of which audiences will hear nowhere else in the area".

However, von Rhein notes that the theater's size poses a challenge to the performers attempting to fill its seats, and feels that it overemphasizes high-priced events. In 2009–2010, the theater introduced a pair of discounted ticket programs: a five dollar lunchtime series of 45-minute dance performances, and a discounted ten dollar ticket program was initiated for in-person, cash-only purchases in the last 90 minutes before performances.

The theater has been recognized with the 2002 American Architecture Award, and the 2005 American Institute of Architects Chicago Institutional Design Excellence Award. In 2008, Joan Harris was recognized with a National Arts Award from Americans for the Arts for her arts leadership and achievement, exemplified in part by funding the Harris Theater with her late husband.

== See also ==
- List of theaters for dance
