= Irma Contreras =

Venezuelan choreographer and ballerina

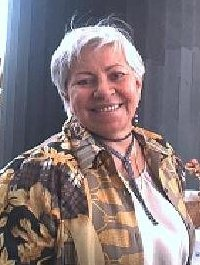
- Born: 1928 (age 96–97); Caracas, Venezuela
- Occupation(s): Dancer, ballet teacher

Irma Contreras (born 1928) is a former dancer, choreographer, and ballet teacher. She is part of the 1940s generation of Venezuelan dancers. She created and founded the National Ballet of Venezuela with her sister Margot Contreras.

== Career ==
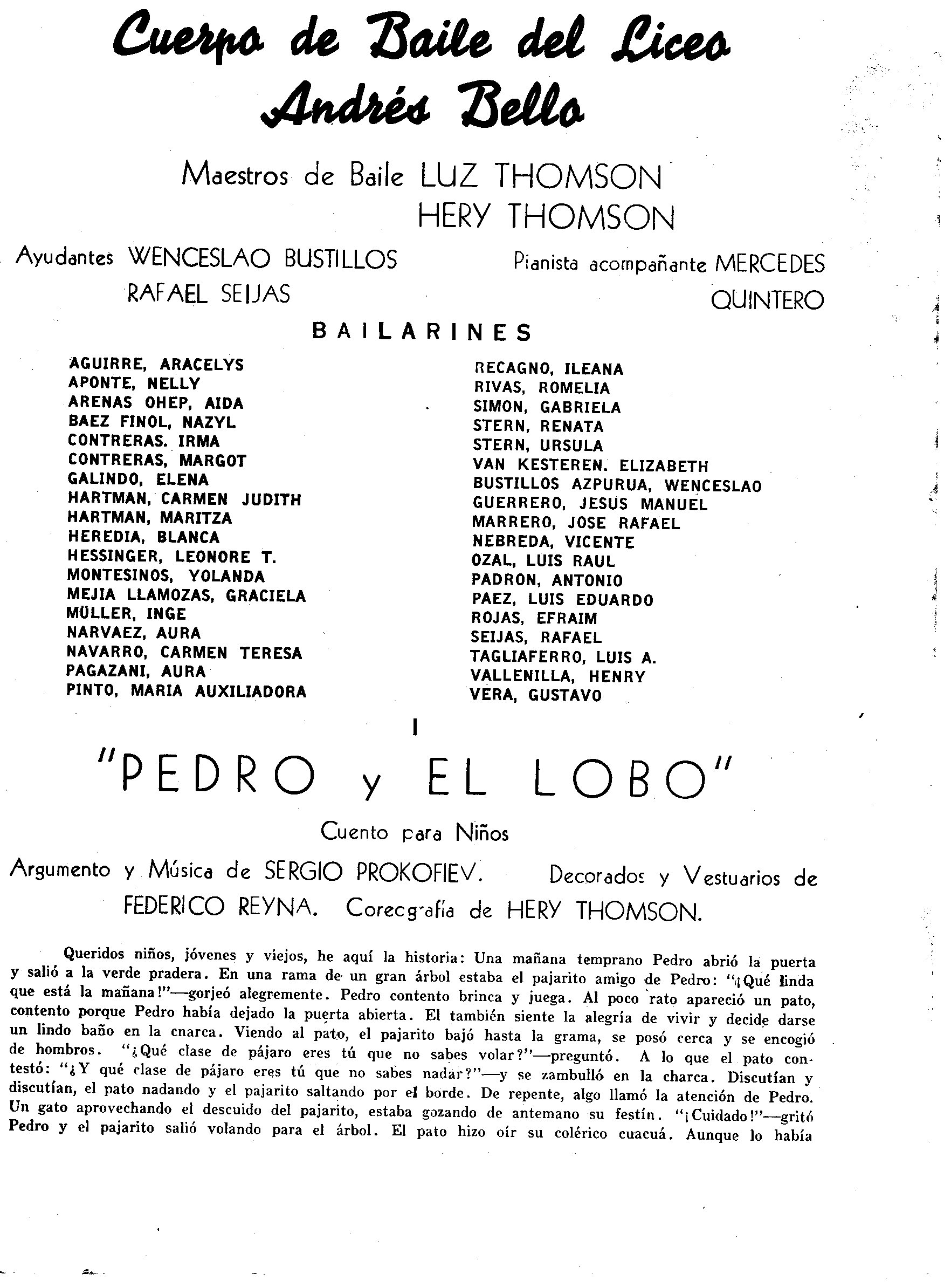
Programme page 1, from a performance of the Andrés Bello School Dance Corps, June 1946, Caracas, Venezuela

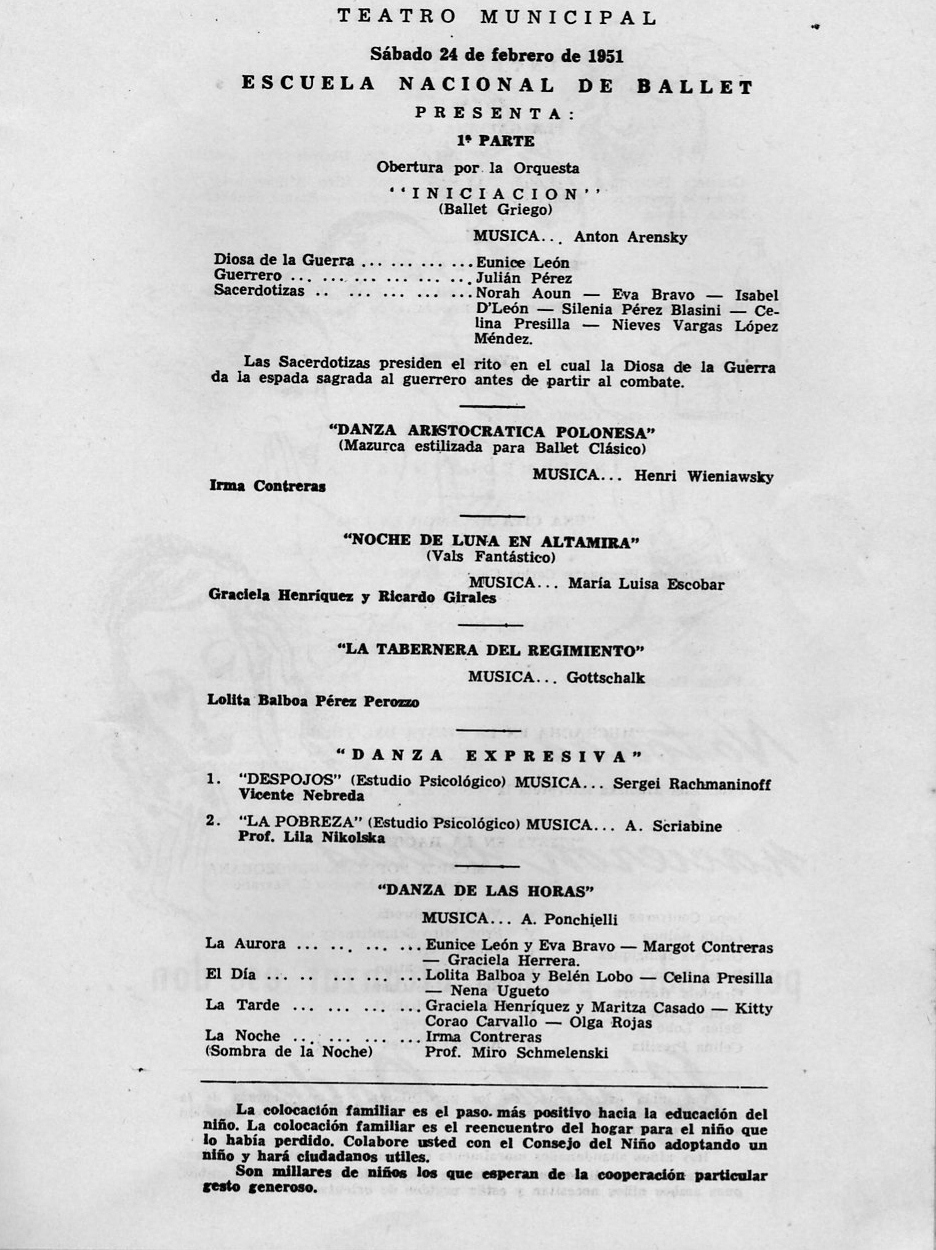
Programme of a function of the National Ballet School, Caracas Municipal Theater, Venezuela, 24 February 1951

Contreras began her ballet studies in Caracas with Argentine teachers Hery and Luz Thomson in an experimental class that opened at the Andrés Bello School around 1945.

In 1948 she entered the National Ballet School, directed by Nena Coronil. Together with Vicente Nebrada, she travelled to Cuba in 1952 and danced in the Alicia Alonso Ballet. Upon her return to Venezuela she entered the newly created Ballet Nena Coronil in 1953. During the Marcos Pérez Jiménez government, Contreras applied for a scholarship to study abroad, to expand her knowledge of ballet; the scholarship was granted and, with Nebreda and Graciela Henríquez, she travelled to Paris. While in France, she danced with the ballet companies of Jean Guelis and Paul Goubert. In 1957 she returned to Venezuela and founded the National Ballet of Venezuela with her sister Margot, the first professional ballet company in the country.

Irma Contreras has been a guest teacher of numerous ballet companies and has taught workshops on the Cecchetti Method.

In 2004 she published the book Danza Clásica, nomenclatura y metodología (English: Classical dance, nomenclature and methodology).

== Choreographies ==
=== Originals ===
- Estudio en Do mayor (Bizet)
- Contrapunto (Bach)
- Arcanas (Varese)

=== Based on others ===
- Don Quijote (pas de deux)
- El Corsario (pas de deux)
- Aguas primaverales
- Las Sílfides
- El lago de los cisnes (segundo acto)

== Awards ==
- 1983: Premio Consejo Nacional de Cultura de Danza Clásica.
- 2004-2005: Premio Nacional de Danza
- 2008: Orden Mérito al Trabajo, renglón Danza Clásica

== Bibliography ==
- PAOLILLO, Carlos. Una aventura, un hito. Ballet Nacional de Venezuela 1957–1980. Editado por Asociación Civil Publicaciones La Danza. Producción e impresión: Ediplus producción, C.A. Caracas, 2004. ISBN 980-6795-00-8
