= Vicente Nebrada =

Venezuelan choreographer and ballet dancer (1930–2002)

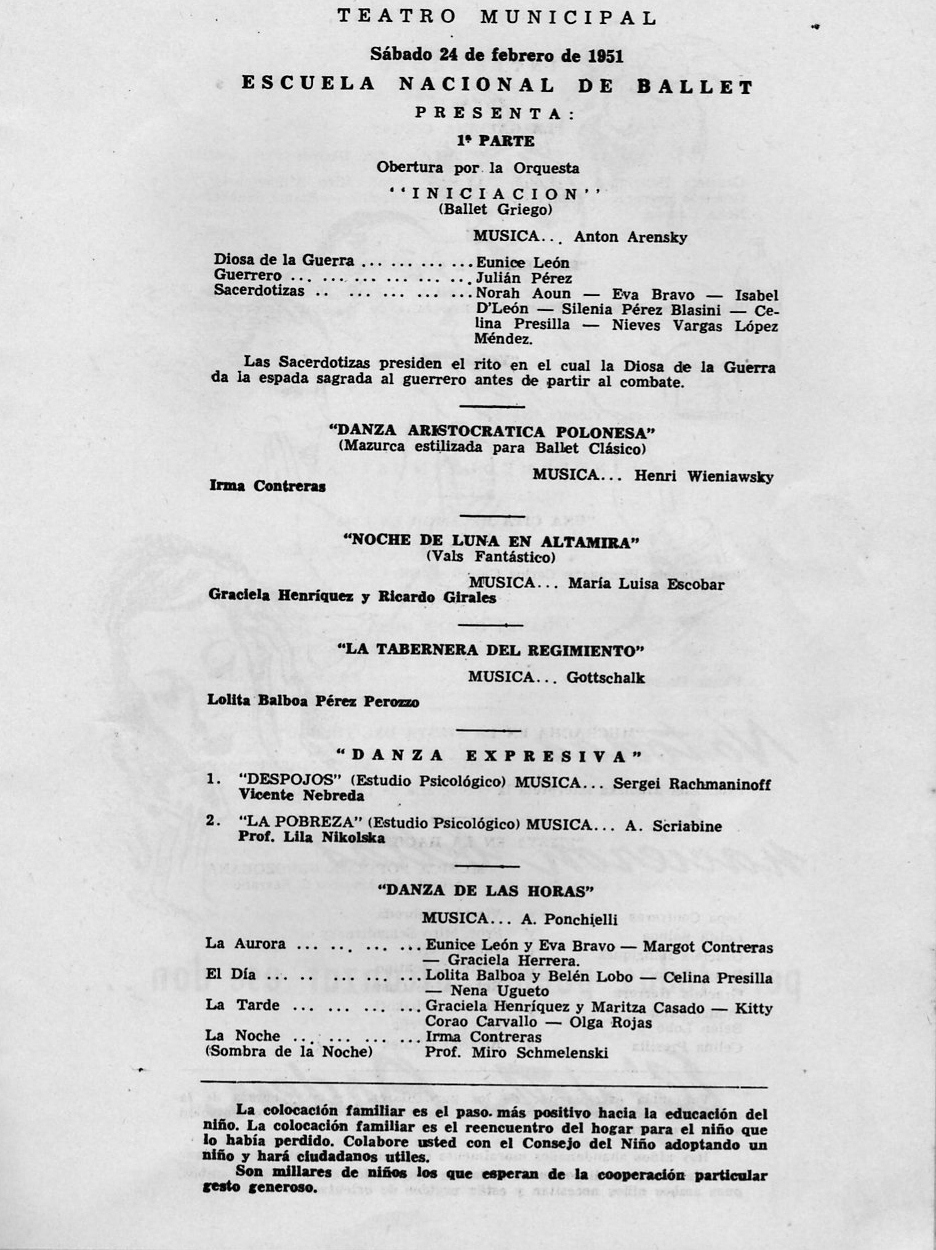
Escuela Nacional de Ballet, Caracas, Venezuela (1951)

Vicente Balbino Nebreda Arias (Caracas, Venezuela, March 31, 1920 – ibid, May 26, 2002) was a choreographer and dancer who was considered a Venezuelan pioneer for dance during the 1940s. He was part of the Cátedra de Ballet del Liceo Andrés Bello, the first attempt at a formal dance school in the country. Later on, he danced with Ballet Nacional de Venezuela, the first long term professional company. Nebrada was also one of the first Venezuelan dancers to have an international career, he worked with Roland Petit’s company in France, the Joffrey Ballet, the Harkness Ballet in the United States, and Ballet Nacional de Cuba. His extensive career as a choreographer began in 1958, when he began his professional career, and ended with the creation of his version of The Nutcracker in 1996. He created 61 original choreographies and adaptations of universally classic repertoires for diverse companies all over the world.

In 1975, Nebrada helped found the International Ballet of Caracas and became their artistic director and resident choreographer in 1977. In 1984, he became the artistic director of the National Ballet of Caracas, where he remained until his death due to leukemia in 2002 at age 72. His dances have been performed by Ballet Hispanico, American Ballet Theatre, Joffrey Ballet of Chicago, National Ballet of Canada, Berlin Opera Ballet, English National Ballet, Australian Ballet and the Universal Ballet of Korea.

== Early life ==
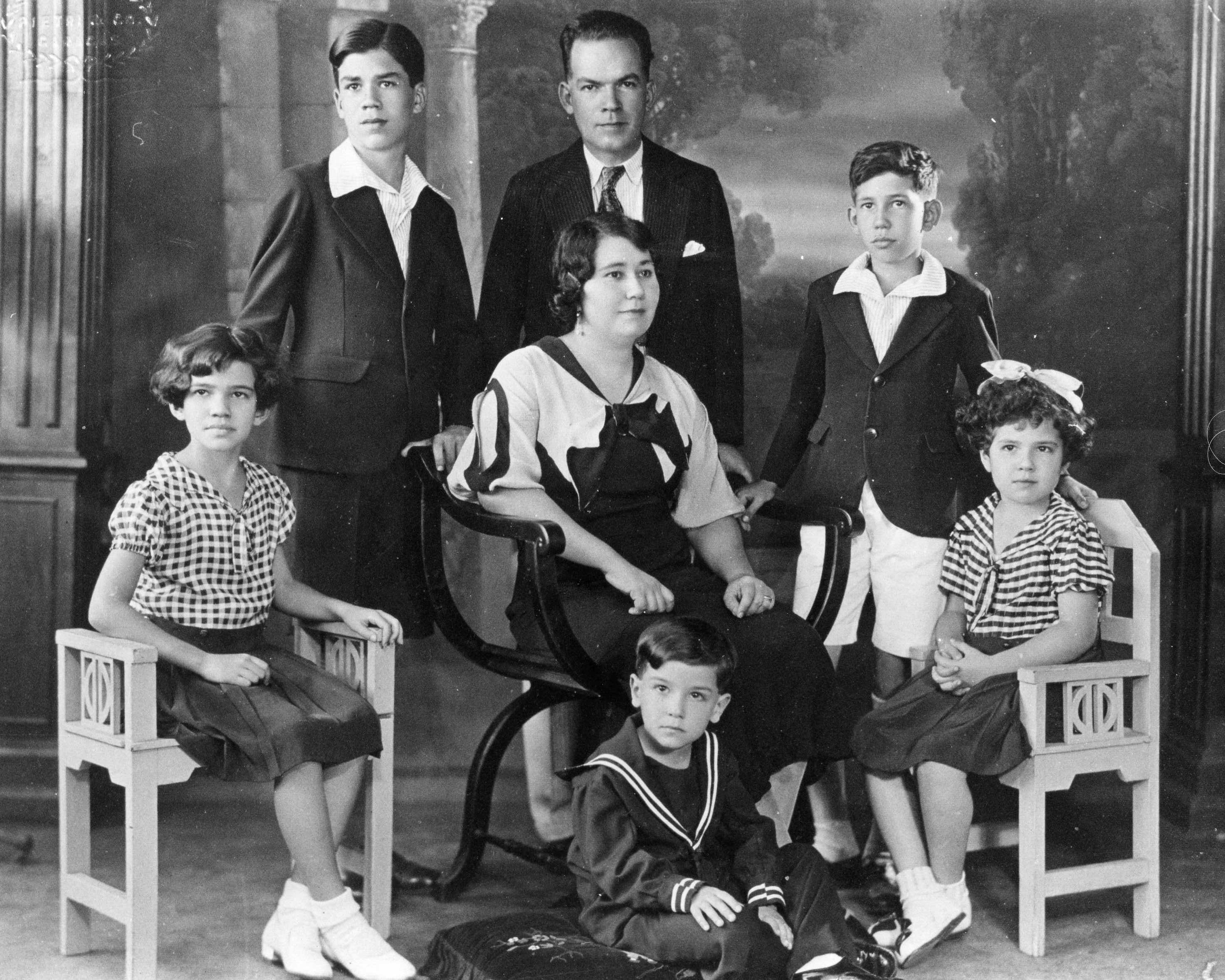
Nebreda Arias family in 1934. Vicente, 4 years old, sitting on the floor. Caracas, Venezuela

Nebrada was born in the San José parish of Caracas. He was the son of Alejandro Nebreda and Josefina Arias. He was the youngest of five siblings in a middle-class family, who descended from Spanish immigrants. His father was a tailor and owner of a leather goods store, which was located in the center of the city. His mother was a housewife and dedicated herself exclusively to caring for the family and raising the children.

Vicente went to elementary school at the Venezuela Experimental School, which was a school where new forms of teaching were put into practice. There he met Isaac Chocrón and Román Chalbaud, with whom he formed a lifelong friendship. The school taught music, dance and theater classes, in addition to the formal elementary school subjects, and had a team of teachers who made innovation in education their goal and put into practice new methods so that the student could make the most of their time at school. Steffy Stahl, an Austrian teacher hired by the Venezuelan state, taught the rhythmic gymnastics course applying the Dalcroze method and put on end-of-year shows in which Vicente played the Indian Guaicaipuro.

His artistic inclinations took hold in his adolescence. He had a particular taste for cinema, which he attended with some regularity. In 1945, he attended a performance at the Teatro Municipal de Caracas of the Compañía de Cantos y Danzas de España directed by dancer Joaquín Pérez Fernández, which sparked his interest in this artistic form. Later that same year, the season of Colonel de Basil's Ballets Russes was presented, also at the Teatro Municipal, a company that was made up of some former dancers from Diaghilev's extinct company. Four of its members, the Argentine spouses Hery and Luz Thomson, and the Irish David and Eva Grey, decided to stay in Venezuela fleeing the misery in which Europe was mired after the Second World War. These dancers began to teach private classes and proposed to the director of the Liceo Andrés Bello, Dionisio López Orihuela, to open a ballet class in that educational institution. The director liked the idea and towards the end of 1945, classes began at the Ballet Chair at the Liceo Andrés Bello. Vicente was a high school student and immediately enrolled in the new course and began his dance studies.

The Thomson couple soon undertook another project outside the Liceo Andrés Bello, El Club de Ballet. The chair remained in the hands of the Greys and Vicente decided to continue with the Thomsons. There he strengthened his friendship with those who would be his dance partners for years and with whom he would leave the country, Irma Contreras and Graciela Henríquez.

In 1948, he entered the Escuela Nacional de Ballet (National Ballet School) directed by Nena Coronil. Four years later, he traveled to New York to continue his ballet studies at the School of American Ballet with teachers Anatole Oboukoff, Pierre Vladimiroff and Edward Caton.

== A distinctive style ==
His style is undeniably Neoclassical. His duets or pas de deux are known for their plasticity, expressiveness and intricate lifts. His partnering style shows a great deal of upper-body freedom while the ballerina moves on and off-balance. His spatial designs are symmetrical, harmonious and often organic, with dancers moving across the stage, while lending a visceral sense of ownership to his dances.

Many of his narrative ballets are filled with colors and dramatic effervescence. This approach is inherent to Latin American idiosyncrasy, and his existence is perhaps a residue from the classic ballets of the romantic era. Some of his best known narrative ballets or classical adaptations are The Nutcracker, Romeo and Juliet, FireBird, Don Quijote, Copelia, Cinderella, Inés de Castro, Van Gogh, and George Sand.

He also imprinted his signature style to many abstract or non-narrative ballets. Some of them present some scenes based on stories or imagery, but they are still considered non-narrative as they do not follow a plot or a script. Examples include Our Waltzes, Lento a Tempo e Apassionato, La luna y Los híjos que tenía, Una Danza para ti, A Haendel's Celebration, Pentimento, Double Colchea and Fever, among others.

Allan Ulricht, writer of the Dance examiner for the San Francisco Chronicle, said: "…'Fever' is clearly an export ballet…" "...The choreography is structured like a classical diversion and Nebrada affirms the women's communal purpose with repeated circular forays. Some of the women struggle, others yield and one is raised aloft like the spirit of feminism triumphant. Thanks to the eight fearless dancers, the effect was intensely visceral. As La Lupe kept singing, 'Adios, adios, adios', I wanted to shout, 'Bienvenido, bienvenido, bienvenido...' (1995)

== International career ==
=== Cuba ===
In 1952, he received an invitation from Alicia Alonsa to join her dance company in Havana, Cuba. After almost a year of work, he injured his knee and decided to return to Venezuela in 1953 in order to recover. After his recovery, he joined the recently created company, Ballet Nena Coronil. With this company, he adapted and interpreted ballets from classic repertoire and began to create choreographies; his adapted pieces of Les Sylphides, Aurora Wedding (act III), and an original work: Concerto in Warsaw, are from this time. On November 15, 1953, the television station Radio Caracas Televisión was founded and on the 16 broadcasts began, Ballet Nena Coranil was part of the first broadcast with Vicente's adaptation of the ballet Les Sylphides, where he performed the principal role with Irma Contreras and Graciela Henríquez. He also was part of the first professional show that the company performed in Teatro Municipal of Caracas.

=== France ===
After two years of work with the Nena Coronil company, Nebrada along with his inseparable friends of the time, Irma Contreras and Graciela Henríquez, realized that to continue their professional careers they should travel outside of the country. It was then that Irma Contreras, using her close contacts to Marcos Pérez Jiménez, got an appointment with him and asked for a scholarship for the three to study outside of the country. Pérez Jiménez granted them the scholarships and paid their airfares. In 1955 they resigned from Ballet Nena Coronil and traveled to France, funded by the Venezuelan government, and settled in Paris. Ballet Nena Coronil closed shortly after this. A main factor of the closure was that Margot Contreras, Irma's sister, left the company and started a new ballet school, Academia Interamericana de Ballet and Ballet Interamericano de Venezuela, opening its doors to the prior students and dancers from Nena Coronil.

The same year Vicente joined Roland Petit's company, in Paris. In addition to dancing he created two small pieces for the company, Pas de Deux and Dance of the Adolescents. A year later he moved to the company Las Estrellas de Montecarlo. Little more than a catalog or program is known about his involvement in this company.

In 1957 he returned to Venezuela with Irma Contreras, who joined Ballet Nacional de Venezuela together with her sister, Margot. Vicente worked in the new company as a soloist and choreographer. He created two works for this company, Fifth Symphony with Tchaikovsky’s music and The Waltz with Maurice Ravel’s music.

=== United States ===
Determined to continue his international career and seeing The United States as his goal, he auditioned for the Joffrey Ballet in 1958. This company was funded by billionaire Rebekah Harkness who inherited her husband’s fortune, he owned shares in the holdings of Standard Oil and, thanks to her investment, the Joffrey company paid the dancers, hired choreographers, and performed shows and tours. Rebekah called for more participation in the artistic decision making and for the company to be named in Harkness’ honor. Robert Joffrey, who was the director and founder of the company, did not accept Rebekah's demands and the Harkess Foundation withdrew its sponsorship. Then in 1964 Rebekah founded Harkness Ballet, and hired many of the dancers who formed Joffrey Ballet, including Vicente.

The Harkness Ballet had its premiere outside of the United States in 1965, in Cannes, with George Skibine as director and a repertoire composed of works by Alvin Ailey, George Skibine, Erik Bruhn, Brian Macdonald, and Stuart Hodes. The company's work was initially overseas and they were immediately successful.

In 1967, tired of dance, with an injured body, and feeling like he was at the age of retirement, he decided to speak with Rebekah and asked her for the opportunity to begin his career as a choreographer and for a smooth transition. Rebekah accepted his proposal and allowed him to begin his choreographic work with the junior company. Vicente started to create the work Caín that was revised and evaluated in the studios by the company's direction, which earned him the opportunity to continue working in the choreographic realm. Thanks to this opportunity in 1969 he created, what would be his first international success, Percussion for Six Men with the music of Lee Gurst. This piece was presented in 1969 and immediately became part of the company's professional repertoire, which it took to a festival in Germany, receiving great reviews from the judges. This success definitely opened the doors for Harkness Ballet to dedicate itself to choreography and stop interpretation. He retired as a dancer in 1970, at 40 years old. He created a total of 8 pieces for the company: Percussion for six men, Schubert Variations, Percussion for Six Women, Geminis, Moonlight, Sebastian, and Shadows and Memories. Being in the company he established his relationship with the dancer Zane Wilson, who would become his good companion and dedicated assistant for more than 30 years and who would accompany and support him in all of his companies.

The company dissolved in 1975 and many of the dancers were incorporated into different companies around the world, among these Ballet Internacional de Caracas, under the artistic direction of Vicente Nebrada and Zhandra Rodríguez.

== Legacy ==
Nebrada's extensive body of work brought a sense of distinctiveness and relevance to Venezuela's cultural heritage. His choreographies continue to be performed around the world as they emerged during a particularly prosper era of Neoclassical ballet in the 20th century. He sought after dancers with both expressivity and technical abilities, and most of his male dancers also needed to be skilled partners. His choreographic style gave an identity to the National Ballet of Caracas, which became the resident ballet company of the Teresa Carreño Cultural complex in 1984. Despite frequent interruptions due to government cuts, the company's funding is subsidized mostly by the Venezuelan government. As with many other companies in the world, the National Ballet of Caracas continue to struggle to maintain its season, pay its dancers and remain viable.

== Awards ==
Nebrada has been the recipient of numerous awards. Among them:

- 1976: Fokine Award, for the choreography Shadows awarded by the Dance University in Paris
- 1984: CONAC Award of Classic Dance, awarded by the National Cultural Council. Venezuela.
- 1986: Diego de Lozada award in its first class, awarded by the Venezuelan government. Venezuela
- 1991: National Artist Award: For his choreography “Swan Lake", awarded by Fundación Casa del Artista. Venezuela. *1991: National Artist Award: as choreographer of the year, awarded by Fundación Casa del Artista. Venezuela.
- 1992: National Dance Award, awarded for the first time in Venezuela.
- 1992: National Artist Award: as choreographer of the year, awarded by Fundación Casa del Artista. Venezuela
- 1993: Andres Bello Order in its First Class. Venezuela
- 1995: The Official Order of Simon Bolivar, celebrating 50 years of Artistic Achievements. Venezuela
- 1995: Municipality of Dance, awarded by local el libertador's Council. Caracas, Venezuela.
- 1996: National Artist Award: as choreographer of the year, awarded by Fundación Casa del Artista. Venezuela.
- 2001: Monseñor Pellín Award in its XII edition: for The Nutcracker as best choreography for children. Venezuela
