= October 2011 in sports =

<<	October 2011					>>
Su	Mo	Tu	We	Th	Fr	Sa
						1
2	3	4	5	6	7	8
9	10	11	12	13	14	15
16	17	18	19	20	21	22
23	24	25	26	27	28	29
30	31
Sports

This list shows notable sports-related deaths, events, and notable outcomes that occurred in October of 2011.

== Deaths in October ==
- 8: Al Davis
- 16: Dan Wheldon
- 23: Marco Simoncelli
- 31: Flórián Albert Sr.

== Sporting seasons ==
=== American football 2011 ===
- National Football League
- NCAA Division I FBS
- NCAA Division I FCS

=== Australian rules football 2011 ===
- Australian Football League

=== Auto racing 2011 ===
- Formula One
- Sprint Cup
- Nationwide Series
- Camping World Truck Series
- IRL IndyCar Series
- World Rally Championship
- WTTC
- V8 Supercar
- Formula Two
- GP2 Series
- American Le Mans
- FIA GT1 World Championship
- World Series by Renault
- Deutsche Tourenwagen Masters
- Super GT

=== Baseball 2011 ===
- Major League Baseball
- Nippon Professional Baseball

=== Basketball 2011 ===
- WNBA
- Euroleague
- EuroLeague Women
- Eurocup
- EuroChallenge
- Australia
- France
- Germany
- Greece
- Israel
- Italy
- Philippines professional:
  - Philippine Cup
- Philippines collegiate:
  - NCAA
- Russia
- Spain
- Turkey

=== Canadian football 2011 ===
- Canadian Football League
- CIS football

=== Cricket 2011 ===
- Australia:
  - Sheffield Shield
  - Ryobi One-Day Cup

=== Football (soccer) 2011 ===
National teams competitions

- 2014 FIFA World Cup qualification
- UEFA Euro 2012 qualifying
- UEFA Women's Euro 2013 qualifying
- 2012 Africa Cup of Nations qualification

International clubs competitions

- UEFA (Europe) Champions League
- UEFA Europa League
- UEFA Women's Champions League
- Copa Sudamericana
- AFC (Asia) Champions League
- AFC Cup
- CAF (Africa) Champions League
- CAF Confederation Cup
- CONCACAF (North & Central America) Champions League
- OFC (Oceania) Champions League

Domestic (national) competitions

- Argentina
- Australia
- Brazil
- England
- France
- Germany
- Iran
- Italy
- Japan
- Norway
- Portugal
- Russia
- Scotland
- Spain
- Major League Soccer (USA & Canada)
  - MLS Cup Playoffs

=== Golf 2011 ===
- PGA Tour
- European Tour
- LPGA Tour
- Champions Tour

=== Ice hockey 2011 ===
- National Hockey League
- Kontinental Hockey League
- Czech Extraliga
- Elitserien
- Canadian Hockey League:
  - OHL, QMJHL, WHL
- NCAA Division I men
- NCAA Division I women

=== Motorcycle racing 2011 ===
- Moto GP

=== Rugby league 2011 ===
- Four Nations
- Autumn International Series
- Super League
- NRL

=== Rugby union 2011 ===
- Aviva Premiership
- RaboDirect Pro12
- Top 14
- Currie Cup

=== Tennis 2011 ===
- ATP World Tour
- WTA Tour

=== Volleyball 2011 ===
International clubs competitions

- Men's CEV Champions League
- Women's CEV Champions League

=== Winter sports ===
- Alpine Skiing World Cup
- ISU Grand Prix
- ISU Junior Grand Prix
- Short Track Speed Skating World Cup
- Snowboard World Cup

== Days of the month ==
=== October 31, 2011 (Monday) ===
  - Gold medal match: (gold) **Malaysia** 3–0 (silver) South Korea
- Nippon Professional Baseball Climax Series:
  - Central League First Stage Game 3 in Meiji Jingu: Yakult Swallows 3, Yomiuri Giants 1. **Swallows win series 2–1.**
- Major League Baseball news: Tony La Russa, the manager of the World Series-winning St. Louis Cardinals, announces his retirement with immediate effect after 33 years and 2,728 career victories as a manager.

==== Cricket ====
- West Indies in Bangladesh:
  - 2nd Test in Dhaka, day 3: West Indies 355 & 207/3 (71 overs, Darren Bravo 100*); Bangladesh 231 (68 overs). West Indies lead by 331 runs with 7 wickets remaining.

=== October 30, 2011 (Sunday) ===
==== Auto racing ====
- Formula One:
  - Indian Grand Prix in Greater Noida, India: (1) Sebastian Vettel (GER) (Red Bull–Renault) (2) Jenson Button (GBR) (McLaren–Mercedes) (3) Fernando Alonso (ESP) (Ferrari)
    - Drivers' championship standings (after 17 of 19 races): (1) Vettel 374 points (2) Button 240 (3) Alonso 227
- Sprint Cup Series – Chase for the Sprint Cup:
  - Tums Fast Relief 500 in Ridgeway, Virginia (all Chevrolet): (1) (Indiana) Tony Stewart (Stewart Haas Racing) (2) (California) Jimmie Johnson (Hendrick Motorsports) (3) (California) Jeff Gordon (Hendrick Motorsports)
    - Drivers' championship standings (after 33 of 36 races): (1) (Missouri) Carl Edwards (Ford; Roush Fenway Racing) 2273 points (2) Stewart 2265 (3) (California) Kevin Harvick (Chevrolet; Richard Childress Racing) 2252

==== Badminton ====
- BWF Super Series:
  - French Super Series in Paris (CHN unless stated):
    - Men's singles: **Lee Chong Wei** (MAS) def. Kenichi Tago (JPN) 21–16, 21–11
    - Women's singles: **Wang Xin** def. Li Xuerui 21–15, 21–19
    - Men's doubles: **Jung Jae-sung**/**Lee Yong-dae** (KOR) def. Cai Yun/Fu Haifeng 14–21, 21–15, 21–11
    - Women's doubles: **Wang Xiaoli**/**Yu Yang** def. Tian Qing/Zhao Yunlei 26–24, 21–15
    - Mixed doubles: **Joachim Fischer Nielsen**/**Christinna Pedersen** (DEN) def. Xu Chen/Ma Jin 21–17, 21–14

==== Baseball ====
- Nippon Professional Baseball Climax Series:
  - Pacific League First Stage Game 2 in Sapporo: Saitama Seibu Lions 8, Hokkaido Nippon-Ham Fighters 1. **Lions win series 2–0.**
  - Central League First Stage Game 2 in Tokyo: Yomiuri Giants 6, Tokyo Yakult Swallows 2. Series tied 1–1.

==== Cricket ====
- West Indies in Bangladesh:
  - 2nd Test in Dhaka, day 2: West Indies 355 (126.4 overs; Kirk Edwards 121, Shakib Al Hasan 5/63); Bangladesh 204/7 (51 overs; Fidel Edwards 5/58). Bangladesh trail by 151 runs with 3 wickets remaining in the 1st innings.

==== Equestrianism ====
- Show jumping – World Cup:
  - Western European League, 3rd competition in Lyon (CSI 5*-W): (gold) Rolf-Göran Bengtsson (SWE) on Casall (silver) Katharina Offel (UKR) on Cathleen (bronze) Steve Guerdat (SUI) on Nino des Buissonnets
    - Standings (after 3 competitions): (1) Pius Schwizer (SUI) 40 points (2) Bengtsson 27 (3) Maikel van der Vleuten (NED) 26
  - North American League – East Coast, 6th competition in Washington, D.C. (CSI 3*-W): (gold) Nick Skelton (GBR) on Carlo (silver) Brianne Goutal (USA) on Nice de Prissey (bronze) Lucy Davis (USA) on Nemo

==== Figure skating ====
- ISU Grand Prix:
  - Skate Canada International in Mississauga, Ontario, Canada:
    - Ice dancing: (gold) Tessa Virtue/Scott Moir (CAN) 178.34 points (silver) Kaitlyn Weaver/Andrew Poje (CAN) 155.99 (bronze) Anna Cappellini/Luca Lanotte (ITA) 154.87
      - Standings (after 2 of 6 events): Virtue/Moir & Meryl Davis/Charlie White (USA) 15 points (1 event), Nathalie Péchalat/Fabian Bourzat (FRA) & Weaver/Poje 13 (1), Cappellini/Lanotte & Isabella Tobias/Deividas Stagniūnas (LTU) 11 (1).

==== Football (soccer) ====
- CAF Confederation Cup Semifinals second leg (first leg score in parentheses): **Maghreb de Fès** (Morocco) 1–0 (1–2) (Angola) Inter Luanda. 2–2 on aggregate; Maghreb de Fès win on away goals.
- OFC Champions League group stage Matchday 1:
  - Group A: Ba (Fiji) 2–1 (New Caledonia) Mont-Dore
- (United States) MLS Cup Playoffs Conference Semifinals, first leg:
  - Western Conference: New York Red Bulls 0–1 Los Angeles Galaxy
  - Eastern Conference:
    - Colorado Rapids 0–2 Sporting Kansas City
    - Philadelphia Union 1–2 Houston Dynamo
- (Norway) Premier League, matchday 28 (team in **bold** qualify for Champions League):
  - **Molde** 2–2 Strømsgodset
  - Rosenborg 3–6 Brann
    - Standings: Molde 55 points, Tromsø 47, Rosenborg 46.
      - Molde win the title for the first time.

==== Golf ====
- European Tour:
  - Andalucía Masters in Sotogrande, Spain:
    - Winner: Sergio García (ESP) 278 (−6)
      - García wins for the second consecutive week, for his tenth European Tour title.

==== Multi-sport events ====
- Pan American Games, day 17 in Guadalajara, Mexico:
  - Athletics:
    - Men's marathon: (gold) Solonei da Silva (BRA) 2:16:37 (silver) Diego Colorado (COL) 2:17:13 (bronze) Juan Carlos Cardona (COL) 2:18:20
  - Basketball:
    - Men's tournament: (gold) Puerto Rico (silver) Mexico (bronze) United States
  - Rugby sevens:
    - Men's tournament: (gold) Canada (silver) Argentina (bronze) United States

==== Short track speed skating ====
- World Cup 2 in Saguenay, Canada:
  - Women's 500m (2): (gold) Arianna Fontana (ITA) 44.279 (silver) Martina Valcepina (ITA) 44.353 (bronze) Liu Qiuhong (CHN) 44.419
    - Standings (after 3 of 8 events): (1) Valcepina 2400 points (2) Marianne St-Gelais (CAN) 2000 (3) Liu 1608
  - Women's 1000m: (gold) St-Gelais 1:30.710 (silver) Elise Christie (GBR) 1:30.900 (bronze) Cho Ha-Ri (KOR) 1:30.908
    - Standings (after 2 of 8 events): (1) Yui Sakai (JPN) 1410 points (2) Christie 1128 (3) St-Gelais 1035
  - Women's 3000m relay: (gold) China (Fan Kexin, Li Jianrou, Liu, Xiao Han) 4:13.559 (silver) Canada (Marie-Eve Drolet, Valérie Maltais, St-Gelais, Caroline Truchon) 4:13.728 (bronze) Japan (Ayuko Ito, Sakai, Sayuri Shimizu, Marie Yoshida) 4:16.886
    - Standings (after 2 of 6 events): (1) China 2000 points (2) Canada 1312 (3) South Korea 1210
  - Men's 500m (2): (gold) François-Louis Tremblay (CAN) 41.655 (silver) Guillaume Bastille (CAN) 41.746 (bronze) Liang Wenhao (CHN) 41.801
    - Standings (after 3 of 8 events): (1) Jon Eley (GBR) 1840 points (2) Charles Hamelin (CAN) 1600 (3) Tremblay 1262
  - Men's 1000m: (gold) Hamelin 1:28.748 (silver) Michael Gilday (CAN) 1:28.835 (bronze) Olivier Jean (CAN) 1:28.979
    - Standings (after 2 of 8 events): (1) Kwak Yoon-Gy (KOR) 1512 points (2) Noh Jin-Kyu (KOR) 1128 (3) Hamelin 1000
  - Men's 5000m relay: (gold) South Korea (Kwak, Lee Ho-Suk, Noh, Sin Da Woon) 6:48.401 (silver) Russia (Semen Elistratov, Vladimir Grigorev, Evgeny Kozulin, Viacheslav Kurginian) 6:49.808 (bronze) Canada (Jean, Gilday, Hamelin, Tremblay) 6:55.598
    - Standings (after 2 of 6 events): (1) Korea & Canada 1640 points (3) Russia & Great Britain 1210

==== Tennis ====
- ATP World Tour:
  - Erste Bank Open in Vienna, Austria:
    - Final: **Jo-Wilfried Tsonga** (FRA) def. Juan Martín del Potro (ARG) 6–7(5), 6–3, 6–4
      - Tsonga wins his second title of the year and seventh of his career.
  - St. Petersburg Open in Saint Petersburg, Russia:
    - Final: **Marin Čilić** (CRO) def. Janko Tipsarević (SRB) 6–3, 3–6, 6–2
      - Čilić wins the sixth title of his career.
- WTA Tour:
  - WTA Tour Championships in Istanbul, Turkey:
    - Final: **Petra Kvitová** (CZE) def. Victoria Azarenka (BLR) 7–5, 4–6, 6–3
      - Kvitová wins her sixth title of the year and seventh of her career.

=== October 29, 2011 (Saturday) ===
==== Baseball ====
- Nippon Professional Baseball Climax Series:
  - Pacific League First Stage Game 1 in Sapporo: Saitama Seibu Lions 5, Hokkaido Nippon-Ham Fighters 2 (F/11). Lions lead series 1–0.
  - Central League First Stage Game 1 in Tokyo: Tokyo Yakult Swallows 3, Yomiuri Giants 2. Swallows lead series 1–0.

==== Cricket ====
- Pakistan vs Sri Lanka in UAE:
  - 2nd Test in Dubai, day 4: Sri Lanka 239 & 257 (109.5 overs; Saeed Ajmal 5/68); Pakistan 403 & 94/1 (24.1 overs). **Pakistan win by 9 wickets; lead 3-match series 1–0.**
- West Indies in Bangladesh:
  - 2nd Test in Dhaka, day 1: West Indies 253/5 (90 overs); Bangladesh.
- England in India:
  - Only T20I in Kolkata: India 120/9 (20 overs); England 121/4 (18.4 overs). **England win by 6 wickets.**

==== Figure skating ====
- ISU Grand Prix:
  - Skate Canada International in Mississauga, Ontario, Canada:
    - Ladies: (gold) Elizaveta Tuktamysheva (RUS) 177.38 points (silver) Akiko Suzuki (JPN) 172.26 (bronze) Ashley Wagner (USA) 165.48
      - Standings (after 2 of 6 events): Alissa Czisny (USA) & Tuktamysheva 15 points (1 event), Carolina Kostner (ITA) & Suzuki 13 (1), Viktoria Helgesson (SWE) & Wagner 11 (1).
    - Pairs: (gold) Tatiana Volosozhar/Maxim Trankov (RUS) 201.38 points (silver) Sui Wenjing/Han Cong (CHN) 180.82 (bronze) Meagan Duhamel/Eric Radford (CAN) 174.84
      - Standings (after 2 of 6 events): Aliona Savchenko/Robin Szolkowy (GER) & Volosozhar/Trankov 15 points (1 event), Zhang Hao/Zhang Dan (CHN) & Sui/Han 13 (1), Kirsten Moore-Towers/Dylan Moscovitch (CAN) & Duhamel/Radford 11 (1).
    - Men: (gold) Patrick Chan (CAN) 253.74 points (silver) Javier Fernández (ESP) 250.33 (bronze) Daisuke Takahashi (JPN) 237.87
      - Standings (after 2 of 6 events): Kevin van der Perren (BEL) 16 points, Michal Březina (CZE) & Chan 15 (1), Denis Ten (KAZ) 14, Fernández 13 (1), Takahiko Kozuka (JPN) & Takahashi 11 (1).

==== Football (soccer) ====
- CAF Confederation Cup Semifinals second leg (first leg score in parentheses): **Club Africain** (Tunisia) 0–0 (1–0) (Nigeria) Sunshine Stars. Club Africain win 1–0 on aggregate.
- AFC Cup Final in Qarshi, Uzbekistan: **Nasaf Qarshi** 2–1 Al-Kuwait
  - Nasaf Qarshi win the title for the first time.
- OFC Champions League group stage Matchday 1:
  - Group A: Waitakere United (New Zealand) 10–0 (French Polynesia) Tefana
  - Group B:
    - Amicale (Vanuatu) 1–1 (Papua New Guinea) Hekari United
    - Koloale (Solomon Islands) 1–4 (New Zealand) Auckland City
- (United States) MLS Cup Playoffs Conference Semifinals, first leg:
  - Western Conference: Real Salt Lake 3–0 Seattle Sounders FC
- (Kazakhstan) Premier League, matchday 32 (team in **bold** qualify for Champions League):
  - **Shakhter** 2–0 Astana
  - Irtysh 2–1 Zhetysu
    - Standings: Shakhter 42 points, Zhetysu 38, Aktobe 34, Astana 33.
      - Shakhter win the title for the first time.

==== Mixed martial arts ====
- UFC 137 in Las Vegas, United States (USA unless stated):
  - Welterweight bout: **Nick Diaz** def. B.J. Penn via unanimous decision (29–28, 29–27, 29–28)
  - Heavyweight bout: **Cheick Kongo** (FRA) def. Matt Mitrione via unanimous decision (30–27, 29–27, 29–28)
  - Heavyweight bout: **Roy Nelson** def. Mirko Filipović (CRO) via TKO (punches)
  - Bantamweight bout: **Scott Jorgensen** def. Jeff Curran via unanimous decision (29–28, 29–28, 30–27)
  - Featherweight bout: **Hatsu Hioki** (JPN) def. George Roop via split decision (29–28, 28–29, 29–28)

==== Multi-sport events ====
- Pan American Games, day 16 in Guadalajara, Mexico:
  - Athletics:
    - Men's 50 kilometres walk: (gold) Horacio Nava (MEX) 3:48:58 (silver) José Ojeda (MEX) 3:49:16 (bronze) Jaime Quiyuch (GUA) 3:50:33
  - Boxing:
    - Men's Flyweight: (gold) Robeisy Ramírez (CUB) (silver) Dagoberto Agüero (DOM) (bronze) Braulio Ávila (MEX) & Julião Henriques (BRA)
    - Men's Lightweight: (gold) Yasniel Toledo (CUB) (silver) Robson Conceição (BRA) (bronze) Ángel Suárez (PUR) & Ángel Gutiérrez (MEX)
    - Men's Welterweight: (gold) Carlos Banteux (CUB) (silver) Óscar Molina (MEX) (bronze) Mian Hussain (CAN) & Myke Carvalho (BRA)
    - Men's Light heavyweight: (gold) Julio la Cruz (CUB) (silver) Yamaguchi Florentino (BRA) (bronze) Armando Pina (MEX) & Carlos Góngora (ECU)
    - Men's Super heavyweight: (gold) Ytalo Perea (ECU) (silver) Juan Hiracheta (MEX) (bronze) Gerardo Bisbal (PUR) & Isaia Mena (COL)
    - Women's Flyweight: (gold) Mandy Bujold (CAN) (silver) Ingrit Valencia (COL) (bronze) Karlha Magliocco (VEN) & Pamela Benavídez (ARG)
    - Women's Light welterweight: (gold) Kiria Tapia (PUR) (silver) Erika Cruz (MEX) (bronze) Sandra Bizier (CAN) & Adela Peralta (ARG)
  - Canoeing:
    - Men's K-1 200 metres: (gold) César de Cesare (ECU) 35.971 (silver) Miguel Correa (ARG) 36.349 (bronze) Ryan Dolan (USA) 36.547
    - Men's C-1 200 metres: (gold) Richard Dalton (CAN) 40.333 (silver) Nivalter Jesus (BRA) 40.619 (bronze) Roleysi Baez (CUB) 41.403
    - Men's K-2 200 metres: (gold) Ryan Cochrane/Hugues Fournel (CAN) 32.375 (silver) Correa/Ruben Resola (ARG) 32.494 (bronze) Givago Ribeiro/Gilvan Ribeiro (BRA) 32.902
    - Women's K-2 500 metres: (gold) Dayexi Gandarela/Yulitza Meneses (CUB) 1:47.332 (silver) Sabrina Ameghino/Alexandra Keresztesi (ARG) 1:48.005 (bronze) Margaret Hogan/Kaitlyn McElroy (USA) 1:48.718
    - Women's K-1 200 metres: (gold) Carrie Johnson (USA) 41.803 (silver) Darisleydis Amador (CUB) 41.840 (bronze) Ameghino 42.685
  - Diving:
    - Men's 10 metre platform: (gold) Iván García (MEX) 553.80 points (silver) Rommel Pacheco (MEX) 508.20 (bronze) Sebastián Villa (COL) 471.05
    - Women's synchronized 3 metre springboard: (gold) Paola Espinosa/Laura Sánchez (MEX) 338.70 points (silver) Jennifer Abel/Émilie Heymans (CAN) 336.30 (bronze) Kassidy Cook/Cassidy Krug (USA) 319.50
  - Equestrian:
    - Individual jumping: (gold) Christine McCrea (USA) 0.88 penalties (silver) Beezie Madden (USA) 1.00 (bronze) Bernardo Alves (BRA) 2.09
  - Fencing:
    - Men's team sabre: (gold) United States (silver) Canada (bronze) Brazil
    - Women's team épée: (gold) United States (silver) Canada (bronze) Mexico
  - Field hockey:
    - Men's tournament: (gold) Argentina (silver) Canada (bronze) Chile
      - Argentina qualify for the 2012 Olympics.
  - Judo:
    - Women's 48 kg: (gold) Paula Pareto (ARG) (silver) Dayaris Mestre (CUB) (bronze) Angela Woosley (USA) & Sarah Menezes (BRA)
    - Women's 52 kg: (gold) Yanet Bermoy (CUB) (silver) Érika Miranda (BRA) (bronze) Angelica Delgado (USA) & Yulieth Sánchez (COL)
    - Men's 60 kg: (gold) Felipe Kitadai (BRA) (silver) Nabor Castillo (MEX) (bronze) Aaron Kunihiro (USA) & Juan Postigos (PER)
  - Karate:
    - Men's 67 kg: (gold) Daniel Viveros (ECU) (silver) Dennis Novo (CUB) (bronze) Daniel Carrillo (MEX) & Jean Carlos Peña (VEN)
    - Men's 75 kg: (gold) Dionicio Gustavo (DOM) (silver) Thomas Scott (USA) (bronze) Lester Zamora (CUB) & David Dubó (CHI)
    - Women's 55 kg: (gold) Shannon Nishi (USA) (silver) Karina Díaz (DOM) (bronze) Valéria Kumizaki (BRA) & Jessy Reyes (CHI)
    - Women's 61 kg: (gold) Bertha Gutiérrez (MEX) (silver) Alexandra Grande (PER) (bronze) Daniela Suárez (VEN) & Marisca Verspaget (AHO)
  - Volleyball:
    - Men's tournament: (gold) Brazil (silver) Cuba (bronze) Argentina
  - Water polo:
    - Men's tournament: (gold) United States (silver) Canada (bronze) Brazil
      - United States qualify for the 2012 Olympics.

==== Rugby league ====
- Four Nations in England and Wales:
  - Round one in Leigh: England 42–4 Wales
- Autumn International Series in Perpignan, France: France 44–10 Scotland

==== Rugby union ====
- Currie Cup Final in Johannesburg: **Golden Lions** 42–16 Sharks
  - The Golden Lions win the title for the tenth time.

==== Short track speed skating ====
- World Cup 2 in Saguenay, Canada:
  - Women's 500m (1): (gold) Marianne St-Gelais (CAN) 44.246 (silver) Martina Valcepina (ITA) 44.511 (bronze) Liu Qiuhong (CHN) 44.548
    - Standings (after 2 of 8 events): (1) St-Gelais 2000 points (2) Valcepina 1600 (3) Liu 968
  - Women's 1500m: (gold) Arianna Fontana (ITA) 2:27.806 (silver) Lee Eun-Byul (KOR) 2:28.896 (bronze) Cho Ha-Ri (KOR) 2:28.932
    - Standings (after 3 of 8 events): (1) Lee 2240 points (2) Katherine Reutter (USA) 2000 (3) Valérie Maltais (CAN) 1312
  - Men's 500m (1): (gold) Olivier Jean (CAN) 41.874 (silver) Charles Hamelin (CAN) 41.976 (bronze) Vladimir Grigorev (RUS) 42.040
    - Standings (after 2 of 8 events): (1) Hamelin 1600 points (2) Jon Eley (GBR) 1512 (3) Jean 1000
  - Men's 1500m: (gold) Noh Jin-Kyu (KOR) 2:17.925 (silver) Kwak Yoon-Gy (KOR) 2:18.008 (bronze) Yuzo Takamido (JPN) 2:18.210
    - Standings (after 3 of 8 events): (1) Noh 2000 points (2) Kwak 1600 (3) Paul Herrmann (GER) 1056

==== Snowboarding ====
- World Cup in London, United Kingdom:
  - Big Air: (gold) Janne Korpi (FIN) 184.0 points (silver) Seppe Smits (BEL) 182.2 (bronze) Joris Ouwerkerk (NED) 152.8
    - Freestyle Overall standings: (1) Korpi 2000 points (2) Dimi de Jong (NED) 860 (3) Zhang Yiwei (CHN) & Smits 800

=== October 28, 2011 (Friday) ===
==== Baseball ====
- World Series:
  - Game 7 in St. Louis: St. Louis Cardinals 6, Texas Rangers 2. **Cardinals win series 4–3.**
    - The Cardinals win the World Series for the first time since 2006, and the eleventh time overall.
    - The Rangers become the first team to lose consecutive World Series since the Atlanta Braves in 1991 and 1992.
    - Cardinals third baseman David Freese is named series MVP to become the sixth player to win World Series MVP and a League Championship Series MVP in the same postseason.

==== Cricket ====
- Pakistan vs Sri Lanka in UAE:
  - 2nd Test in Dubai, day 3: Sri Lanka 239 & 88/1 (45 overs); Pakistan 403 (141.1 overs). Sri Lanka trail by 76 runs with 9 wickets remaining.
- Australia in South Africa:
  - 3rd ODI in Durban: South Africa 222/6 (50 overs); Australia 227/7 (47.3 overs). **Australia win by 3 wickets; win 3-match series 2–1.**

==== Multi-sport events ====
- Pan American Games, day 15 in Guadalajara, Mexico:
  - Athletics:
    - Women's 3000 metres steeplechase: (gold) Sara Hall (USA) 10:03.16 (silver) Ángela Figueroa (COL) 10:10.14 (bronze) Sabine Heitling (BRA) 10:10.98
    - Women's 4 × 100 metres relay: (gold) Brazil (Ana Cláudia Lemos, Vanda Gomes, Franciela Krasucki, Rosângela Santos) 42.85 (silver) United States (Kenyanna Wilson, Barbara Pierre, Yvette Lewis, Chastity Riggien) 43.10 (bronze) Colombia (Lina Flórez, Jennifer Padilla, Yomara Hinestroza, Norma González) 43.44
    - Women's 4 × 400 metres relay: (gold) Cuba (Aymée Martínez, Diosmely Peña, Susana Clement, Daisurami Bonne) 3:28.09 (silver) Brazil (Joelma Sousa, Geisa Coutinho, Bárbara de Oliveira, Jailma de Lima) 3:29.59 (bronze) Colombia (Princesa Oliveros, Norma González, Evelis Aguilar, Jennifer Padilla) 3:29.94
    - Women's discus throw: (gold) Yarelys Barrios (CUB) 66.40m (silver) Aretha Thurmond (USA) 59.53m (bronze) Denia Caballero (CUB) 58.63m
    - Women's triple jump: (gold) Caterine Ibargüen (COL) 14.92m (silver) Yargelis Savigne (CUB) 14.36m (bronze) Mabel Gay (CUB) 14.28m
    - Men's 110 metres hurdles: (gold) Dayron Robles (CUB) 13.10 (silver) Paulo Villar (COL) 13.27 (bronze) Orlando Ortega (CUB) 13.30
    - Men's 800 metres: (gold) Andy González (CUB) 1:45.58 (silver) Kléberson Davide (BRA) 1:45.75 (bronze) Raidel Acea (CUB) 1:46.23
    - Men's 3000 metres steeplechase: (gold) José Peña (VEN) 8:48.19 (silver) Hudson de Souza (BRA) 8:48.75 (bronze) José Alberto Sánchez (CUB) 8:49.75
    - Men's 4 × 100 metres relay: (gold) Brazil (Ailson Feitosa, Sandro Viana, Nilson André, Bruno de Barros) 38.18 (silver) Saint Kitts and Nevis (Jason Rogers, Antoine Adams, Delwayne Delaney, Brijesh Lawrence) 38.81 (bronze) United States (Calesio Newman, Jeremy Dodson, Rubin Williams, Monzavous Edwards) 39.17
    - Men's 4 × 400 metres relay: (gold) Cuba (Noel Ruiz, Yoandri Betanzos, Omar Cisneros, William Collazo) 2:59.43 (silver) Dominican Republic (Arismendy Peguero, Luguelín Santos, Yoel Tapia, Gustavo Cuesta) 3:00.44 (bronze) Venezuela (Arturo Ramírez, Alberto Aguilar, José Acevedo, Omar Longart) 3:00.82
    - Men's javelin throw: (gold) Guillermo Martínez (CUB) 87.20m (silver) Cyrus Hostetler (USA) 82.24m (bronze) Braian Toledo (ARG) 79.53m
    - Men's pole vault: (gold) Lázaro Borges (CUB) 5.80m (silver) Jeremy Scott (USA) 5.60m (bronze) Giovanni Lanaro (MEX) 5.50m
  - Boxing:
    - Men's Light flyweight: (gold) Joselito Velázquez (MEX) (silver) Yosbany Veitia (CUB) (bronze) Jantony Ortiz (PUR) & Juan Medina Herrad (DOM)
    - Men's Bantamweight: (gold) Lázaro Alvárez (CUB) (silver) Óscar Valdez (MEX) (bronze) Ángel Rodríguez (VEN) & Robenílson Vieira de Jesus (BRA)
    - Men's Light welterweight: (gold) Roniel Iglesias (CUB) (silver) Valentino Knowles (BAH) (bronze) Éverton Lopes (BRA) & Joelvis Hernández (VEN)
    - Men's Middleweight: (gold) Emilio Correa (CUB) (silver) Jaime Cortez (ECU) (bronze) Juan Carlos Rodríguez (VEN) & Brody Blair (CAN)
    - Men's Heavyweight: (gold) Lenier Pero (CUB) (silver) Julio Castillo (ECU) (bronze) Yamil Peralta (ARG) & Anderson Emmanuel (BRB)
    - Women's Flyweight: (gold) Mary Spencer (CAN) (silver) Yenebier Guillén (DOM) (bronze) Pamela Benavídez (ARG) & Karlha Magliocco (VEN)
  - Canoeing:
    - Men's K-1 1000 metres: (gold) Jorge García (CUB) 3:41.257 (silver) Daniel Dal Bo (ARG) 3:43.038 (bronze) Philippe Duchesneau (CAN) 3:44.504
    - Men's C-1 1000 metres: (gold) Everardo Cristóbal (MEX) 4:03.288 (silver) Reydel Ramos (CUB) 4:03.973 (bronze) Johnnathan Tafra (CHI) 4:05.323
    - Men's K-2 1000 metres: (gold) Steven Jorens/Richard Dessureault-Dober (CAN) 3:17.230 (silver) Reinier Torres/García (CUB) 3:19.158 (bronze) Pablo de Torres/Roberto Sallette (ARG) 3:19.599
    - Men's C-2 1000 metres: (gold) Karel Aguilar Chacón/Serguey Torres (CUB) 3:39.280 (silver) Erlon Silva/Ronilson Oliveira (BRA) 3:40.482 (bronze) Ronny Ratia/Anderson Ramos (VEN) 3:40.990
    - Women's K-1 500 metres: (gold) Carrie Johnson (USA) 1:54.243 (silver) Émilie Fournel (CAN) 1:54.900 (bronze) Alexandra Keresztesi (ARG) 1:55.764
  - Diving:
    - Men's synchronized 10 metre platform: (gold) Iván García/Germán Sánchez (MEX) 479.88 points (silver) Jeinkler Aguirre/José Guerra (CUB) 447.57 (bronze) Kevin Geyson/Eric Sehn (CAN) 399.93
    - Women's 3 metre springboard: (gold) Laura Sánchez (MEX) 374.60 points (silver) Cassidy Krug (USA) 372.65 (bronze) Paola Espinosa (MEX) 356.20
  - Fencing:
    - Men's team foil: (gold) United States (silver) Canada (bronze) Brazil
    - Women's team sabre: (gold) United States (silver) Mexico (bronze) Venezuela
  - Field hockey:
    - Women's tournament: (gold) United States (silver) Argentina (bronze) Chile
      - United States qualify for the 2012 Olympics.
  - Football:
    - Men's tournament: (gold) Mexico (silver) Argentina (bronze) Uruguay
  - Gymnastics:
    - Men's horizontal bar: (gold) Paul Ruggeri (USA) 15.650 points (silver) Jossimar Calvo (COL) 14.825 (bronze) Ángel Ramos (PUR) 14.625
    - Men's parallel bars: (gold) Daniel Corral (MEX) 15.525 points (silver) Jorge Giraldo (COL), Luis Vargas (PUR) & Ruggeri 14.825
    - Men's vault: (gold) Diego Hypólito (BRA) 15.875 points (silver) Tomás González (CHI) 15.587 (bronze) Hugh Smith (CAN) 15.575
    - Women's balance beam: (gold) Ana Sofía Gómez (GUA) 14.175 points (silver) Kristina Vaculik (CAN) 13.925 (bronze) Daniele Hypólito (BRA) 13.750
    - Women's floor: (gold) Ana Lago (MEX) 13.800 points (silver) Mikaela Gerber (CAN) 13.775 (bronze) Hypólito 13.750
  - Judo:
    - Women's 57 kg: (gold) Yurisleidy Lupetey (CUB) (silver) Rafaela Silva (BRA) (bronze) Joliane Melançon (CAN) & Hana Carmichael (USA)
    - Women's 63 kg: (gold) Yaritza Abel (CUB) (silver) Karina Acosta (MEX) (bronze) Christal Ransom (USA) & Stéfanie Tremblay (CAN)
    - Men's 66 kg: (gold) Leandro Cunha (BRA) (silver) Kenneth Hashimoto (USA) (bronze) Anyelo Gómez (CUB) & Ricardo Valderrama (VEN)
    - Men's 73 kg: (gold) Bruno Silva (BRA) (silver) Alejandro Clara (ARG) (bronze) Ronald Girones (CUB) & Nick Tritton (CAN)
  - Karate:
    - Men's 60 kg: (gold) Andrés Rendón (COL) (silver) Norberto Sosa (DOM) (bronze) Douglas Brose (BRA) & Miguel Soffia (CHI)
    - Men's 84 kg: (gold) César Herrera (VEN) (silver) Jorge Pérez (DOM) (bronze) Homero Morales (MEX) & Alexandru Sorin (CAN)
    - Women's 50 kg: (gold) Ana Villanueva (DOM) (silver) Gabriela Bruna (CHI) (bronze) Jéssica Cândido (BRA) & Cheili González (GUA)
    - Women's 68 kg: (gold) Lucélia Ribeiro (BRA) (silver) Yadira Lira (MEX) (bronze) Yoly Guillén (VEN) & Yoandra Moreno (CUB)
  - Water polo:
    - Women's tournament: (gold) United States (silver) Canada (bronze) Brazil
      - United States qualify for the 2012 Olympics.

==== Rugby league ====
- Four Nations in England and Wales:
  - Round one in Warrington: Australia 26–12 New Zealand

=== October 27, 2011 (Thursday) ===
==== Baseball ====
- World Series:
  - Game 6 in St. Louis: St. Louis Cardinals 10, Texas Rangers 9 (F/11). Series tied 3–3.

==== Basketball ====
- Euroleague Regular Season Matchday 2:
  - Group A:
    - Olympiacos (Greece) 81–74 (Turkey) Fenerbahçe Ülker
    - SLUC Nancy (France) 87–73 (Spain) Bilbao Basket
      - Standings: (Spain) Caja Laboral 2–0, SLUC Nancy, Bilbao Basket, (Italy) Bennet Cantù, Olympiacos 1–1, Fenerbahçe Ülker 0–2.
  - Group C:
    - Real Madrid (Spain) 85–78 (Italy) EA7 Emporio Armani
    - Maccabi Tel Aviv (Israel) 70–66 (Serbia) Partizan Mt:s Belgrade
      - Standings: Real Madrid 2–0, EA7 Emporio Armani, (Turkey) Anadolu Efes, Maccabi Tel Aviv, (Belgium) Spirou Charleroi 1–1, Partizan Mt:s Belgrade 0–2.
  - Group D:
    - Galatasaray Medical Park (Turkey) 64–68 (Russia) UNICS Kazan
    - Montepaschi Siena (Italy) 79–57 (Slovenia) Union Olimpija Ljubljana
    - FC Barcelona Regal (Spain) 88–61 (Poland) Asseco Prokom Gdynia
      - Standings: FC Barcelona Regal, Montepaschi Siena 2–0, Galatasaray Medical Park, UNICS Kazan 1–1, Asseco Prokom Gdynia, Union Olimpija Ljubljana 0–2.

==== Cricket ====
- Pakistan vs Sri Lanka in UAE:
  - 2nd Test in Dubai, day 2: Sri Lanka 239; Pakistan 281/4 (99 overs; Azhar Ali 100). Pakistan lead by 42 runs with 6 wickets remaining in the 1st innings.

==== Football (soccer) ====
- UEFA Women's Euro 2013 qualifying Matchday 4:
  - Group 2:
    - Kazakhstan 0–4 Spain
    - Romania 7–1 Turkey
      - Standings (after 4 matches unless stated): Spain 9 points (3 matches), Germany 6 (2), Romania 6, Kazakhstan 4, Switzerland 3 (3), Turkey 1.
  - Group 3: Bulgaria 0–4 Hungary
    - Standings (after 3 matches unless stated): Iceland 13 points (5 matches), Norway 6, Belgium 4, Northern Ireland 3 (2), Hungary 3 (4), Bulgaria 0.
  - Group 4: Scotland 2–2 Wales
    - Standings (after 4 matches unless stated): France 12 points, Republic of Ireland 6 (3), Scotland 4 (2), Wales 1 (3), Israel 0.
  - Group 5: Belarus 2–2 Finland
    - Standings (after 2 matches unless stated): Finland, Ukraine, Slovakia, Belarus 4 points, Estonia 0 (4).
  - Group 6:
    - Croatia 3–3 Slovenia
    - Netherlands 0–0 England
      - Standings (after 3 matches unless stated): Netherlands 7 points, England 5, Serbia 4, Croatia 1 (2), Slovenia 1.
- (United States) MLS Cup Playoffs Play-in round: **Colorado Rapids** 1–0 Columbus Crew

==== Multi-sport events ====
- Pan American Games, day 14 in Guadalajara, Mexico:
  - Athletics:
    - Men's 200 metres: (gold) Roberto Skyers (CUB) 20.37 (silver) Lansford Spence (JAM) 20.38 (bronze) Bruno de Barros (BRA) 20.45
    - Men's 400 metres hurdles: (gold) Omar Cisneros (CUB) 47.99 (silver) Isa Phillips (JAM) 48.82 (bronze) Félix Sánchez (DOM) 48.85
    - Men's 10,000 metres: (gold) Marílson Gomes dos Santos (BRA) 29:00.64 (silver) Juan Carlos Romero (MEX) 29:41.00 (bronze) Giovani dos Santos (BRA) 29:51.71
    - Men's high jump: (gold) Donald Thomas (BAH) 2.32m (silver) Diego Ferrín (ECU) 2.30m (bronze) Víctor Moya (CUB) 2.26m
    - Men's triple jump: (gold) Alexis Copello (CUB) 17.21m (silver) Yoandri Betanzos (CUB) 16.54m (bronze) Jefferson Sabino (BRA) 16.51m
    - Women's 200 metres: (gold) Ana Cláudia Lemos (BRA) 22.76 (silver) Simone Facey (JAM) 22.86 (bronze) Mariely Sánchez (DOM) 23.02
    - Women's 1500 metres: (gold) Adriana Muñoz (CUB) 4:26.09 (silver) Rosibel García (COL) 4:26.78 (bronze) Malindi Elmore (CAN) 4:27.57
    - Women's 5,000 metres: (gold) Marisol Romero (MEX) 16:24.08 (silver) Cruz da Silva (BRA) 16:29.75 (bronze) Inés Melchor (PER) 16:41.50
    - Women's shot put: (gold) Misleydis González (CUB) 18.57m (silver) Cleopatra Borel-Brown (TRI) 18.46m (bronze) Michelle Carter (USA) 18.09m
    - Women's javelin throw: (gold) Alicia DeShasier (USA) 58.01m (silver) Yainelis Ribeaux (CUB) 56.21m (bronze) Yanet Cruz (CUB) 56.19m
  - Basque pelota:
    - Women's Paleta Rubber Pairs Trinkete: (gold) María García/Verónica Stele (ARG) (silver) María Miranda/Camila Naviliat (URU) (bronze) Ariana Cepeda/Rocio Guillén (MEX)
    - Women's Frontenis Pairs 30m Fronton: (gold) Paulina Castillo/Guadalupe Hernández (MEX) (silver) Lisandra Lima/Yasmary Medina (CUB) (bronze) Johanna Zair/Irina Podversich (ARG)
    - Men's Mano Singles Trinkete: (gold) Heriberto López (MEX) (silver) Darien Povea (CUB) (bronze) Roger Etchevers (USA)
    - Men's Mano Doubles 36m Fronton: (gold) Jorge Alcántara/Orlando Díaz (MEX) (silver) José Huarte/Tony Huarte (USA) (bronze) Dariel Leiva/Rubén Moya (CUB)
    - Men's Mano Singles 36m Fronton: (gold) Fernando Medina (MEX) (silver) Roberto Huarte (USA) (bronze) Henry Despaigne (CUB)
    - Men's Frontenis Pairs 30m Fronton: (gold) Alberto Rodríguez/Arturo Rodríguez (MEX) (silver) Daniel Alonso/César Arocha (CUB) (bronze) Alexis Clementín/Maximiliano Alberdi (ARG)
  - Bowling:
    - Men's individual: (gold) Santiago Mejía (COL) (silver) Chris Barnes (USA) (bronze) Marcelo Suartz (BRA) & Manuel Fernández (DOM)
    - Women's individual: (gold) Liz Johnson (USA) (silver) Jennifer Park (CAN) (bronze) Caroline Lagrange (CAN) & Karen Marcano (VEN)
  - Canoeing:
    - Men's K-4 1000 metres: (gold) Cuba (Maikel Zulueta, Reinier Torres, Osvaldo Labrada, Jorge García) 3:01.061 (silver) Canada (Steven Jorens, Richard Dessureault-Dober, Philippe Duchesneau, Connor Taras) 3:02.653 (bronze) Brazil (Celso de Oliveira, Gilvan Ribeiro, Givago Ribeiro, Roberto Maheler) 3:02.821
  - Diving:
    - Men's 3 metre springboard: (gold) Yahel Castillo (MEX) 529.45 points (silver) Julián Sánchez (MEX) 480.65 (bronze) César Castro (BRA) 462.15
    - Women's synchronized 10 metre platform: (gold) Paola Espinosa/Tatiana Ortiz (MEX) 326.31 points (silver) Meaghan Benfeito/Roseline Filion 318.66 (CAN) (bronze) Yaima Mena/Annia Rivera (CUB) 269.28
  - Equestrian:
    - Team jumping: (gold) United States 2.90 penalties (silver) Brazil 11.58 (bronze) Mexico 13.24
  - Fencing:
    - Men's team épée: (gold) United States (silver) Venezuela (bronze) Canada
    - Women's team foil: (gold) United States (silver) Canada (bronze) Venezuela
  - Football:
    - Women's tournament: (gold) Canada (silver) Brazil (bronze) Mexico
  - Gymnastics:
    - Men's floor: (gold) Diego Hypólito (BRA) 15.800 points (silver) Tomás González (CHI) 15.625 (bronze) Alexander Rodríguez (PUR) 14.900
    - Men's pommel horse: (gold) Daniel Corral (MEX) 15.300 points (silver) Jorge Giraldo (COL) 14.625 (bronze) Jorge Peña (COL) 14.450
    - Men's rings: (gold) Brandon Wynn (USA) 15.625 points (silver) Arthur Zanetti (BRA) 15.600 (bronze) Christopher Maestas (USA) 15.550
    - Women's uneven bars: (gold) Bridgette Caquatto (USA) 14.525 points (silver) Shawn Johnson (USA) 14.500 (bronze) Elsa García (MEX) & Marisela Cantú (MEX) 13.625
    - Women's vault: (gold) Brandie Jay (USA) 14.337 points (silver) García 14.312 (bronze) Catalina Escobar (COL) 14.162
  - Judo:
    - Women's 70 kg: (gold) Onix Cortés (CUB) (silver) Yuri Alvear (COL) (bronze) María Pérez (PUR) & Maria Portela (BRA)
    - Women's 78 kg: (gold) Kayla Harrison (USA) (silver) Catherine Roberge (CAN) (bronze) Yalennis Castillo (CUB) & Mayra Aguiar (BRA)
    - Men's 81 kg: (gold) Leandro Guilheiro (BRA) (silver) Gadiel Miranda (PUR) (bronze) Emmanuel Lucenti (ARG) & Antoine Valois (CAN)
    - Men's 90 kg: (gold) Tiago Camilo (BRA) (silver) Asley González (CUB) (bronze) Alexandre Emond (CAN) & Isao Cárdenas (MEX)
  - Karate:
    - Men's +84 kg: (gold) Ángel Aponte (VEN) (silver) Alberto Ramírez (MEX) (bronze) Wellington Barbosa (BRA) & Shaun Dhillon (CAN)
    - Women's +68 kg: (gold) Maria Castellanos (GUA) (silver) Xunashi Caballero (MEX) (bronze) Olivia Grant (CAN) & Claudia Vera (CHI)
  - Roller skating:
    - Men's 1,000 metres: (gold) Pedro Causil (COL) 1:25.941 (silver) Ezequiel Capellano (ARG) 1:25.973 (bronze) Jorge Reyes (CHI) 1:26.239
    - Men's 10,000 metres: (gold) Jorge Bolaños (ECU) 22 points (silver) Capellano 19 (bronze) Reyes 10
    - Women's 1,000 metres: (gold) Yersy Puello (COL) 1:35.056 (silver) Sandra Buelvas (VEN) 1:35.336 (bronze) Melisa Bonnet (ARG) 1:35.439
    - Women's 10,000 metres: (gold) Kelly Martínez (COL) 30 points (silver) Bonnet 23 (bronze) Catherine Peñán (CHI) 10
  - Weightlifting:
    - Women's +75 kg: (gold) Oliva Nieve (ECU) 258 kg (silver) Yaniuska Espinoza (VEN) 245 kg (bronze) Tania Mascorro (MEX) 244 kg
    - Men's 105 kg: (gold) Jorge Arroyo (ECU) 395 kg (silver) Julio Luna (VEN) 380 kg (bronze) Donald Shankle (USA) 368 kg
    - Men's +105 kg: (gold) Fernando Reis (BRA) 410 kg (silver) Yoel Morales (VEN) 393 kg (bronze) George Kobaladze (CAN) 393 kg

=== October 26, 2011 (Wednesday) ===
==== Baseball ====
- World Series:
  - Game 6 in St. Louis: Texas Rangers vs. St. Louis Cardinals — postponed to October 27 due to rain.

==== Basketball ====
- Euroleague Regular Season Matchday 2:
  - Group A: Caja Laboral (Spain) 81–69 (Italy) Bennet Cantù
    - Standings: Caja Laboral 2–0, (Spain) Bilbao Basket 1–0, Bennet Cantù 1–1, (Turkey) Fenerbahçe Ülker, (France) SLUC Nancy, (Greece) Olympiacos 0–1.
  - Group B:
    - CSKA Moscow (Russia) 94–74 (Germany) Brose Baskets
    - KK Zagreb (Croatia) 62–81 (Greece) Panathinaikos
      - Standings: Panathinaikos, CSKA Moscow 2–0, Brose Baskets, (Spain) Unicaja 1–1, (Lithuania) Žalgiris Kaunas, KK Zagreb 0–2.
  - Group C: Anadolu Efes (Turkey) 79–80 (Belgium) Spirou Charleroi
    - Standings: (Spain) Real Madrid, (Italy) EA7 Emporio Armani 1–0, Spirou Charleroi, Anadolu Efes 1–1, (Israel) Maccabi Tel Aviv, (Serbia) Partizan Mt:s Belgrade 0–1.
- NCAA (Philippines) in Quezon City, Philippines:
  - Men's Finals: San Beda College 57, San Sebastián College-Recoletos 55. **San Beda win best-of-3 series 2–0.**
    - San Beda wins their fifth NCAA title in six years, and ties Letran College with the most number of men's titles with 16.

==== Cricket ====
- Pakistan vs Sri Lanka in UAE:
  - 2nd Test in Dubai, day 1: Sri Lanka 239 (79 overs); Pakistan 42/0 (9 overs). Pakistan trail by 197 runs with 10 wickets remaining in the 1st innings.

==== Football (soccer) ====
- UEFA Women's Euro 2013 qualifying Matchday 4:
  - Group 1:
    - North Macedonia 1–1 Greece
    - Italy 2–0 Russia
    - Poland 4–0 Bosnia and Herzegovina
      - Standings (after 3 matches unless stated): Italy 9 points, Russia, Poland 6, Greece, Macedonia 1 (2), Bosnia and Herzegovina 0.
  - Group 3:
    - Belgium 0–1 Norway
    - Northern Ireland 0–2 Iceland
      - Standings (after 3 matches unless stated): Iceland 13 points (5 matches), Norway 6, Belgium 4, Northern Ireland 3 (2), Bulgaria 0 (2), Hungary 0.
  - Group 4: France 5–0 Israel
    - Standings (after 4 matches unless stated): France 12 points, Republic of Ireland 6 (3), Scotland 3 (1), Wales 0 (2), Israel 0.
  - Group 5: Slovakia 3–1 Estonia
    - Standings (after 1 match unless stated): Ukraine, Slovakia 4 points (2 matches), Finland, Belarus 3, Estonia 0 (4).
  - Group 7:
    - Austria 3–0 Armenia
    - Portugal 0–3 Denmark
      - Standings (after 3 matches unless stated): Denmark 9 points, Czech Republic 4 (2), Austria 4, Portugal 3, Armenia 0.
- Copa Sudamericana Round of 16 second leg (first leg scores in parentheses):
  - **Universidad de Chile** 1–0 (4–0) (Brazil) Flamengo. Universidad de Chile win 6–0 on points.
  - **Vasco da Gama** (Brazil) 8–3 (1–3) (Bolivia) Aurora. 3–3 on points; Vasco da Gama win 9–6 on aggregate.
  - **Libertad** (Paraguay) 2–0 (0–1) (Brazil) São Paulo. 3–3 on points; Libertad win 2–1 on aggregate.
- AFC Champions League Semi-finals second leg (first leg scores in parentheses):
  - **Jeonbuk Hyundai Motors** (South Korea) 3–2 (2–1) (Saudi Arabia) Al-Ittihad. Jeonbuk Hyundai Motors win 5–3 on aggregate.
  - **Al-Sadd** (Qatar) 0–1 (2–0) (South Korea) Suwon Samsung Bluewings. Al-Sadd win 2–1 on aggregate.
- (United States) MLS Cup Playoffs Play-in round: FC Dallas 0–2 **New York Red Bulls**

==== Multi-sport events ====
- Pan American Games, day 13 in Guadalajara, Mexico:
  - Athletics:
    - Women's 100 metres hurdles: (gold) Yvette Lewis (USA) 12.82 (silver) Angela Whyte (CAN) 13.09 (bronze) Lina Flórez (COL) 13.09
    - Women's 400 metres hurdles: (gold) Princesa Oliveros (COL) 56.26 (silver) Lucy Jaramillo (ECU) 56.95 (bronze) Yolanda Osana (DOM) 57.08
    - Women's 400 metres: (gold) Jennifer Padilla (COL) 51.53 (silver) Daisurami Bonne (CUB) 51.69 (bronze) Geisa Coutinho (BRA) 51.87
    - Women's long jump: (gold) Maurren Maggi (BRA) 6.94m (silver) Shameka Marshall (USA) 6.73m (bronze) Caterine Ibargüen (COL) 6.63m
    - Women's high jump: (gold) Lesyani Mayor (CUB) 1.89m (silver) Marielys Rojas (VEN) 1.89m (bronze) Romary Rifka (MEX) 1.89m
    - Women's heptathlon: (gold) Lucimara da Silva (BRA) 6133 points (silver) Yasmiany Pedroso (CUB) 5710 (bronze) Francia Manzanillo (DOM) 5644
    - Men's 400 metres: (gold) Nery Brenes (CRC) 44.65 (silver) Luguelín Santos (DOM) 44.71 (bronze) Ramon Miller (BAH) 45.01
    - Men's 1500 metres: (gold) Leandro de Oliveira (BRA) 3:53.44 (silver) Bayron Piedra (ECU) 3:53.45 (bronze) Eduar Villanueva (VEN) 3:54.06
    - Men's hammer throw: (gold) Kibwe Johnson (USA) 79.63m (silver) Michael Mai (USA) 72.71m (bronze) Noleysi Bicet (CUB) 72.57m
  - Basque pelota:
    - Men's Paleta Rubber Pairs Trinkete: (gold) Facundo Andreasen/Sergio Villegas (ARG) (silver) Carlos Buzzo/Enzo Cazzola (URU) (bronze) Adrián Raya/Guillermo Verdeja (MEX)
    - Men's Paleta Leather Pairs 36m Fronton: (gold) Rafael Fernández/Azuan Pérez (CUB) (silver) Rodrigo Ledesma/Francisco Mendiburu (MEX) (bronze) Luciano Callarelli/Carlos Dorato (ARG)
    - Men's Paleta Leather Pairs Trinkete: (gold) Cristian Andrés Algarbe/Jorge Villegas (ARG) (silver) Pablo Baldizán/Gastón Dufau (URU) (bronze) Frendy Fernández/Anderson Jardines (CUB)
    - Men's Paleta Rubber Pairs 30m Fronton: (gold) Fernando Ergueta/Javier Nicosia (ARG) (silver) Jesús Hurtado/Daniel Salvador Rodríguez (MEX) (bronze) José Fiffe/Jhoan Torreblanca (CUB)
  - Canoeing:
    - Women's K-4 500 metres: (gold) Canada (Kristin Ann Gauthier, Kathleen Fraser, Alexa Irvin, Una Lounder) 1:37.724 (silver) Mexico (Maricela Montemayor, Karina Alanís, Anais Abraham, Alicia Guluarte) 1:37.799 (bronze) Cuba (Yulitza Meneses, Dayexi Gandarela, Darisleydis Amador, Yusmari Mengana) 1:39.105
  - Diving:
    - Women's 10 metre platform: (gold) Paola Espinosa (MEX) 370.60 points (silver) Tatiana Ortiz (MEX) 369.05 (bronze) Meaghan Benfeito (CAN) 358.20
    - Men's synchronized 3 metre springboard: (gold) Yahel Castillo/Julián Sánchez (MEX) 457.32 points (silver) Troy Dumais/Kristian Ipsen (USA) 411.99 (bronze) René Hernández/Jorge Pupo (CUB) 384.33
  - Fencing:
    - Women's individual épée: (gold) Kelley Hurley (USA) (silver) Courtney Hurley (USA) (bronze) Yamirka Rodríguez (CUB) & Elida Agüero (ARG)
    - Men's individual sabre: (gold) Philippe Beaudry (CAN) (silver) Tim Morehouse (USA) (bronze) Hernán Jansen (VEN) & Joseph Polossifakis (CAN)
  - Gymnastics:
    - Women's artistic individual all-around: (gold) Bridgette Caquatto (USA) 55.875 points (silver) Ana Sofía Gómez (GUA) 55.425 (bronze) Kristina Vaculik (CAN) 54.775
    - Men's artistic individual all-around: (gold) Jossimar Calvo (COL) 86.400 points (silver) Jorge Hugo Giraldo (COL) 86.200 (bronze) Tomás González (CHI) 86.050
  - Judo:
    - Women's +78 kg: (gold) Idalys Ortiz (CUB) (silver) Melissa Mojica (PUR) (bronze) Maria Suelen Altheman (BRA) & Vanessa Zambotti (MEX)
    - Men's 100 kg: (gold) Luciano Corrêa (BRA) (silver) Oreydi Despaigne (CUB) (bronze) Cristian Schmidt (ARG) & Sergio García (MEX)
    - Men's +100 kg: (gold) Óscar Brayson (CUB) (silver) Rafael da Silva (BRA) (bronze) Anthony Turner Jr. (USA) & Pablo Figueroa (PUR)
  - Roller skating:
    - Men's 300 metres time-trial: (gold) Pedro Causil (COL) 24.802 (silver) Emanuelle Silva (CHI) 25.102 (bronze) Juan Cruz Araldi (ARG) 25.703
    - Women's 300 metres time-trial: (gold) Yersy Puello (COL) 26.444 (silver) Maria Moya (CHI) 26.807 (bronze) Verónica Elías (MEX) 27.414
  - Weightlifting:
    - Women's 69 kg: (gold) Mercedes Pérez (COL) 232 kg (silver) Cinthya Dominguez (MEX) 226 kg (bronze) Aremi Fuentes (MEX) 221 kg
    - Women's 75 kg: (gold) Ubaldina Valoyes (COL) 250 kg (silver) María Fernanda Valdés (CHI) 229 kg (bronze) María Álvarez (VEN) 228 kg
    - Men's 94 kg: (gold) Javier Vanega (CUB) 370 kg (silver) Herbys Márquez (VEN) 365 kg (bronze) Eduardo Guadamud (ECU) 365 kg

=== October 25, 2011 (Tuesday) ===
==== Basketball ====
- Euroleague Regular Season Matchday 2:
  - Group B: Unicaja (Spain) 85–78 (OT) (Lithuania) Žalgiris Kaunas
    - Standings: (Germany) Brose Baskets, (Greece) Panathinaikos, (Russia) CSKA Moscow 1–0, Unicaja 1–1, (Croatia) KK Zagreb 0–1, Žalgiris Kaunas 0–2.

==== Cricket ====
- West Indies in Bangladesh:
  - 1st Test in Chittagong, day 5: Bangladesh 350/9d & 119/3d (42 overs); West Indies 244 (68 overs; Elias Sunny 6/94) & 100/2 (22 overs). **Match drawn; 2-match series tied 0–0.**
- England in India:
  - 5th ODI in Kolkata: India 271/8 (50 overs); England 176 (37 overs). **India win by 95 runs; win 5-match series 5–0.**
- New Zealand in Zimbabwe:
  - 3rd ODI in Bulawayo: New Zealand 328/5 (50 overs; Ross Taylor 119, Kane Williamson 100*); Zimbabwe 329/9 (49.5 overs). **Zimbabwe win by 1 wicket; New Zealand win 3-match series 2–1.**

==== Football (soccer) ====
- Copa Sudamericana Round of 16 second leg (first leg score in parentheses): **Santa Fe** (Colombia) 4–1 (1–1) (Brazil) Botafogo. Santa Fe win 4–1 on points.
- (Republic of Ireland) League of Ireland Premier Division, matchday 35 (team in **bold** qualify for Champions League, teams in italics qualify for Europa League): UCD 1–2 **Shamrock Rovers**
  - Standings: Shamrock Rovers 74 points, Sligo Rovers 70, Derry City 67.
    - Shamrock win the title for the 17th time.

==== Multi-sport events ====
- Pan American Games, day 12 in Guadalajara, Mexico:
  - Athletics:
    - Women's 100 metres: (gold) Rosângela Santos (BRA) 11.22 (silver) Barbara Pierre (USA) 11.25 (bronze) Shakera Reece (BAR) 11.26
    - Women's 800 metres: (gold) Adriana Muñoz (CUB) 2:04.08 (silver) Gabriela Medina (MEX) 2:04.41 (bronze) Rosibel García (COL) 2:04.45
    - Men's 100 metres: (gold) Lerone Clarke (JAM) 10.01 (silver) Kim Collins (SKN) 10.04 (bronze) Emmanuel Callander (TRI) 10.16
    - Men's long jump: (gold) Víctor Castillo (VEN) 8.05m (silver) Daniel Pineda (CHI) 7.97m (bronze) David Registe (DMA) 7.89m
    - Men's shot put: (gold) Dylan Armstrong (CAN) 21.30m (silver) Carlos Véliz (CUB) 20.76m (bronze) Germán Lauro (ARG) 20.41m
    - Men's decathlon: (gold) Leonel Suárez (CUB) 8373 points (silver) Maurice Smith (JAM) 8214 (bronze) Yordanis García (CUB) 8074
  - Baseball:
    - Men's tournament: (gold) Canada (silver) United States (bronze) Cuba
  - Basketball:
    - Women's tournament: (gold) Puerto Rico (silver) Mexico (bronze) Brazil
  - Bowling:
    - Women's pairs: (gold) Liz Johnson/Kelly Kulick (USA) 5257 points (silver) Sandra Góngora/Miriam Zetter (MEX) 4929 (bronze) Anggie Ramírez/María Rodríguez (COL) 4851
    - Men's pairs: (gold) Bill O'Neill/Chris Barnes (USA) 5211 points (silver) José Lander/Amleto Monacelli (VEN) 5018 (bronze) Santiago Mejía/Jaime Andrés Gómez (COL) 4856
  - Fencing:
    - Women's individual sabre: (gold) Mariel Zagunis (USA) (silver) Alejandra Benítez (VEN) (bronze) Yaritza Goulet (CUB) & Eileen Grench (PAN)
    - Men's individual foil: (gold) Alex Massialas (USA) (silver) Felipe Alvear (CHI) (bronze) Guilherme Toldo (BRA) & Antonio Leal (VEN)
  - Gymnastics:
    - Men's artistic team all-around: (gold) Brazil (Francisco Barretto, Petrix Barbosa, Péricles da Silva, Diego Hypólito, Arthur Zanetti, Sergio Sasaki) 346.100 points (silver) Puerto Rico (Rafael Morales, Ángel Ramos, Tommy Ramos, Luis Rivera, Alexander Rodríguez, Luis Vargas) 344.850 (bronze) United States (Donothan Bailey, Christopher Maestas, Tyler Mizoguchi, Sho Nakamori, Paul Ruggeri, Brandon Wynn) 342.000
  - Racquetball:
    - Men's team: (gold) Mexico (silver) United States (bronze) Colombia & Ecuador
    - Women's team: (gold) Mexico (silver) United States (bronze) Bolivia & Ecuador
  - Weightlifting:
    - Women's 63 kg: (gold) Christine Girard (CAN) 238 kg (silver) Nísida Palomeque (COL) 235 kg (bronze) Luz Acosta (MEX) 230 kg
    - Men's 77 kg: (gold) Iván Cambar (CUB) 338 kg (silver) Ricardo Flores (ECU) 329 kg (bronze) Chad Vaughn (USA) 326 kg
    - Men's 85 kg: (gold) Yoelmis Hernández (CUB) 363 kg (silver) Carlos Andica (COL) 362 kg (bronze) Kendrick Farris (USA) 348 kg

=== October 24, 2011 (Monday) ===
==== Baseball ====
- World Series:
  - Game 5 in Arlington, Texas: Texas Rangers 4, St. Louis Cardinals 2. Rangers lead series 3–2.

==== Cricket ====
- West Indies in Bangladesh:
  - 1st Test in Chittagong, day 4: Bangladesh 350/9d (122.4 overs); West Indies 144/5 (51 overs). West Indies trail by 206 runs with 5 wickets remaining in the 1st innings.

==== Multi-sport events ====
- Pan American Games, day 11 in Guadalajara, Mexico:
  - Athletics:
    - Men's 5000 metres: (gold) Juan Luis Barrios (MEX) 14:13.77 (silver) Bayron Piedra (ECU) 14:15.74 (bronze) Joilson Silva (BRA) 14:16.11
    - Men's discus throw: (gold) Jorge Fernández (CUB) 65.58m (silver) Jarred Rome (USA) 61.71m (bronze) Ronald Julião (BRA) 61.70m
    - Women's 10,000 metres: (gold) Marisol Romero (MEX) 34:07.24 (silver) Cruz da Silva (BRA) 34:22.44 (bronze) Yolanda Caballero (COL) 34:39.14
    - Women's hammer throw: (gold) Yipsi Moreno (CUB) 75.62m (silver) Sultana Frizell (CAN) 70.11m (bronze) Amber Campbell (USA) 69.93m
    - Women's pole vault: (gold) Yarisley Silva (CUB) 4.75m (silver) Fabiana Murer (BRA) 4.70m (bronze) Becky Holliday (USA) 4.30m
  - Fencing:
    - Women's individual foil: (gold) Lee Kiefer (USA) (silver) Nzingha Prescod (USA) (bronze) Monica Peterson (CAN) & Nataly Michel (MEX)
    - Men's individual épée: (gold) Weston Kelsey (USA) (silver) Rubén Limardo (VEN) (bronze) Silvio Fernández (VEN) & Reynier Henriquez (CUB)
  - Gymnastics:
    - Women's artistic team all-around: (gold) United States (Bridgette Caquatto, Jessie Deziel, Brandie Jay, Shawn Johnson, Grace McLaughlin, Bridget Sloan) 219.750 points (silver) Canada (Talia Chiarelli, Mikaela Gerber, Coralie Leblond, Christine Lee, Dominique Pegg, Kristina Vaculik) 217.450 (bronze) Mexico (Marisela Cantú, Yessenia Estrada, Elsa García, Ana Estefania Lago, Alexa Moreno, Karla Salazar) 214.325
  - Handball:
    - Men's tournament: (gold) Argentina (silver) Brazil (bronze) Chile
      - Argentina qualify for the 2012 Olympics.
  - Roller skating:
    - Men's free skating: (gold) Marcel Sturmer (BRA) 134.20 points (silver) Daniel Arriola (ARG) 129.80 (bronze) Leonardo Parrado (COL) 124.80
    - Women's free skating: (gold) Elizabeth Soler (ARG) 129.30 points (silver) Marisol Villarroel (CHI) 123.70 (bronze) Talitha Haas (BRA) 122.70
  - Weightlifting:
    - Women's 53 kg: (gold) Yudelquis Contreras (DOM) 206 kg (silver) Inmara Henríquez (VEN) 189 kg (bronze) Francia Peñuñuri (MEX) 188 kg
    - Women's 58 kg: (gold) Alexandra Escobar (ECU) 221 kg (silver) Jackelina Heredia (COL) 216 kg (bronze) Lina Rivas (COL) 215 kg
    - Men's 69 kg: (gold) Israel José Rubio (VEN) 318 kg (silver) Junior Sánchez (VEN) 310 kg (bronze) Doyler Sánchez (COL) 310 kg
  - Wrestling:
    - Men's Freestyle 60 kg: (gold) Franklin Gómez (PUR) (silver) Guillermo Torres (MEX) (bronze) Fernando Iglesias (ARG) & Yowlys Bonne (CUB)
    - Men's Freestyle 74 kg: (gold) Jordan Burroughs (USA) (silver) Yunierki Blanco (CUB) (bronze) Matthew Gentry (CAN) & Ricardo Roberty (VEN)
    - Men's Freestyle 96 kg: (gold) Jake Varner (USA) (silver) Luis Vivenes (ECU) (bronze) Khetag Pliev (CAN) & Juan Esteban Martínez (COL)

=== October 23, 2011 (Sunday) ===
==== Alpine skiing ====
- Men's World Cup in Sölden, Austria:
  - Giant Slalom: (gold) Ted Ligety (USA) 2:22.00 (silver) Alexis Pinturault (FRA) 2:22.29 (bronze) Philipp Schörghofer (AUT) 2:22.51

==== Auto racing ====
- Sprint Cup Series – Chase for the Sprint Cup:
  - Good Sam Club 500 in Talladega, Alabama: (1) (Kansas) Clint Bowyer (Chevrolet; Richard Childress Racing) (2) (Virginia) Jeff Burton (Chevrolet; Richard Childress Racing) (3) (Ohio) Dave Blaney (Chevrolet; Tommy Baldwin Racing)
    - Drivers' championship standings (after 32 of 36 races): (1) (Missouri) Carl Edwards (Ford; Roush Fenway Racing) 2237 points (2) (Wisconsin) Matt Kenseth (Ford; Roush Fenway Racing) 2223 (3) (Michigan) Brad Keselowski (Dodge; Penske Racing) 2219
- V8 Supercars:
  - Gold Coast 600 in Surfers Paradise, Queensland (AUS unless stated):
    - Race 22: (1) Mark Winterbottom/Richard Lyons (GBR) (Ford Performance Racing; Ford FG Falcon) (2) Jamie Whincup/Sébastien Bourdais (FRA) (Triple Eight Race Engineering; Holden VE Commodore) (3) Lee Holdsworth/Simon Pagenaud (FRA) (Garry Rogers Motorsport; Holden VE Commodore)
      - Drivers' championship standings (after 22 of 28 races): (1) Whincup 2517 points (2) Craig Lowndes (Triple Eight Race Engineering; Holden VE Commodore) 2374 (3) Shane van Gisbergen (NZL) (Stone Brothers Racing; Ford FG Falcon) 2009
- World Rally Championship:
  - Rally de España in Salou, Spain: (1) Sébastien Loeb (FRA)/Daniel Elena (MON) (Citroën DS3 WRC) (2) Mikko Hirvonen (FIN)/Jarmo Lehtinen (FIN) (Ford Fiesta RS WRC) (3) Jari-Matti Latvala (FIN)/Miikka Anttila (FIN) (Ford Fiesta RS WRC)
    - Drivers' championship standings (after 12 of 13 rallies): (1) Loeb 222 points (2) Hirvonen 214 (3) Sébastien Ogier (FRA) (Citroën DS3 WRC) 193
- World Touring Car Championship:
  - Race of Japan in Suzuka:
    - Race 1: (1) Alain Menu (SUI) (Chevrolet; Chevrolet Cruze) (2) Robert Huff (GBR) (Chevrolet; Chevrolet Cruze) (3) Michel Nykjær (DEN) (Sunred Engineering; SEAT León)
    - Race 2: (1) Tom Coronel (NED) (ROAL Motorsport; BMW 320 TC) (2) Yvan Muller (FRA) (Chevrolet; Chevrolet Cruze) (3) Huff
      - Drivers' championship standings (after 10 of 12 rounds): (1) Muller 363 points (2) Huff 350 (3) Menu 290

==== Badminton ====
- BWF Super Series:
  - Denmark Super Series Premier in Odense (CHN unless stated):
    - Men's singles: **Chen Long** def. Lee Chong Wei (MAS) 21–15, 21–18
    - Women's singles: **Wang Xin** def. Wang Yihan 21–14, 23–21
    - Men's doubles: **Jung Jae-sung** (KOR)/**Lee Yong-dae** (KOR) def. Cai Yun/Fu Haifeng 21–16, 21–17
    - Women's doubles: **Wang Xiaoli**/**Yu Yang** def. Tian Qing/Zhao Yunlei 22–20, 21–16
    - Mixed doubles: **Joachim Fischer Nielsen** (DEN)/**Christinna Pedersen** (DEN) def. Xu Chen/Ma Jin 22–20, 21–16

==== Baseball ====
- World Series:
  - Game 4 in Arlington, Texas: Texas Rangers 4, St. Louis Cardinals 0. Series tied 2–2.

==== Cricket ====
- West Indies in Bangladesh:
  - 1st Test in Chittagong, day 3: Bangladesh 255/4 (91 overs); West Indies. No play due to rain.
- England in India:
  - 4th ODI in Mumbai: England 220 (46.1 overs); India 223/4 (40.1 overs). **India win by 6 wickets; lead 5-match series 4–0.**
- Australia in South Africa:
  - 2nd ODI in Port Elizabeth: South Africa 303/6 (50 overs); Australia 223 (50 overs). **South Africa win by 80 runs; 3-match series tied 1–1.**

==== Equestrianism ====
- Show jumping – World Cup Western European League:
  - 2nd competition in Helsinki (CSI 5*-W): (gold) Pius Schwizer (SUI) on Carlina (silver) Maikel van der Vleuten (NED) on Verdi (bronze) Malin Baryard-Johnsson (SWE) on Reveur de Hurtebise
    - Standings (after 2 competitions): (1) Schwizer 40 points (2) van der Vleuten 26 (3) Angelica Augustsson (SWE) 18

==== Figure skating ====
- ISU Grand Prix:
  - Skate America in Ontario, California, United States:
    - Pairs: (gold) Aliona Savchenko/Robin Szolkowy (GER) 183.98 points (silver) Zhang Dan/Zhang Hao (CHN) 178.66 (bronze) Kirsten Moore-Towers/Dylan Moscovitch (CAN) 177.43
    - Ladies: (gold) Alissa Czisny (USA) 177.48 points (silver) Carolina Kostner (ITA) 177.35 (bronze) Viktoria Helgesson (SWE) 145;75

==== Football (soccer) ====
- UEFA Women's Euro 2013 qualifying Matchday 3:
  - Group 2: Spain 3–2 Switzerland
    - Standings (after 3 matches unless stated): Spain, Germany 6 points (2 matches), Kazakhstan 4, Switzerland, Romania 3, Turkey 1.
- (Lithuania) A Lyga, matchday 31 (team in **bold** qualify for Champions League, team in italics qualify for Europa League):
  - Tauras 0–1 **Ekranas**
  - Sūduva 2–0 Žalgiris
    - Standings: Ekranas 76 points, Žalgiris 69, Sūduva 61.
      - Ekranas win the title for the fourth successive time and seventh time overall.
- (Belarus) Premier League, matchday 29 (team in **bold** qualify for Champions League):
  - Neman Grodno 2–2 Gomel
  - Dinamo Minsk 3–2 Shakhtyor
  - **BATE Borisov** 4–2 Torpedo Zhodino
    - Standings: BATE Borisov 61 points, Shakhtyor 49, Gomel 47, Dinamo Minsk 46.
      - BATE win the title for the sixth successive time and a record eighth time overall.

==== Golf ====
- PGA Tour:
  - Fall Series: Children's Miracle Network Hospitals Classic in Lake Buena Vista, Florida:
    - Winner: Luke Donald (ENG) 271 (−17)
      - Donald wins his fourth PGA Tour title.
- European Tour:
  - Castelló Masters in Castellón, Spain:
    - Winner: Sergio García (ESP) 257 (−27)
      - García wins the tournament for the second time, for his ninth European Tour title and first since 2008.
- LPGA Tour:
  - Sunrise LPGA Taiwan Championship in Yangmei, Taoyuan:
    - Winner: Yani Tseng (TWN) 272 (−16)
      - Tseng wins her seventh title of the year, and twelfth of her career.

==== Motorcycle racing ====
- Moto GP:
  - Malaysian Grand Prix in Sepang, Malaysia:
    - MotoGP: Race cancelled
      - Marco Simoncelli is killed after an accident on the second lap of the race, which was stopped and later abandoned.
      - Riders' championship standings (after 17 of 18 races): (1) Casey Stoner (AUS) (Honda) 325 points (2) Jorge Lorenzo (ESP) (Yamaha) 260 (3) Andrea Dovizioso (ITA) (Honda) 212
    - Moto2: (1) Thomas Lüthi (SUI) (Suter) (2) Stefan Bradl (GER) (Kalex) (3) Pol Espargaró (ESP) (FTR)
      - Riders' championship standings (after 16 of 17 races): (1) Bradl 274 points (2) Marc Márquez (ESP) (Suter) 251 (3) Andrea Iannone (ITA) (Suter) 172
    - 125cc: (1) Maverick Viñales (ESP) (Aprilia) (2) Sandro Cortese (GER) (Aprilia) (3) Johann Zarco (FRA) (Derbi)
      - Riders' championship standings (after 16 of 17 races): (1) Nicolás Terol (ESP) (Aprilia) 282 points (2) Zarco 262 (3) Cortese 225

==== Multi-sport events ====
- Pan American Games, day 10 in Guadalajara, Mexico:
  - Athletics:
    - Men's 20 kilometres walk: (gold) Erick Barrondo (GUA) 1:21:51 (silver) James Rendón (COL) 1:22:46 (bronze) Luis Fernando López (COL) 1:22:51
    - Women's 20 kilometres walk: (gold) Jamy Franco (GUA) 1:32:38 (silver) Mirna Ortíz (GUA) 1:33:37 (bronze) Ingrid Hernández (COL) 1:34:06
    - Women's marathon: (gold) Adriana da Silva (BRA) 2:36:37 (silver) Madaí Pérez (MEX) 2:38:03 (bronze) Gladys Tejeda (PER) 2:42:09
  - Equestrian:
    - Individual eventing: (gold) Jessica Phoenix (CAN) 43.90 penalties (silver) Hannah Burnett (USA) 45.20 (bronze) Bruce Davidson (USA) 48.90
    - Team eventing: (gold) United States 138.60 penalties (silver) Canada 172.50 (bronze) Brazil 209.80
  - Handball:
    - Women's tournament: (gold) Brazil (silver) Argentina (bronze) Dominican Republic
      - Brazil qualify for the 2012 Olympics.
  - Sailing:
    - Women's sailboard: (gold) Patricia Freitas (BRA) (silver) Demita Vega (MEX) (bronze) Farrah Hall (USA)
    - Women's Laser Radial class: (gold) Cecilia Saroli (ARG) (silver) Tania Calles (MEX) (bronze) Paige Railey (USA)
    - Men's sailboard: (gold) Ricardo Santos (BRA) (silver) Mariano Reutemann (ARG) (bronze) David Mier (MEX)
    - Men's Laser class: (gold) Julio Alsogaray (ARG) (silver) Matias Del Solar (CHI) (bronze) Juan Maegli (GUA)
    - Sunfish class: (gold) Matheus Dellangnello (BRA) (silver) Paul Foerster (USA) (bronze) Francisco Renna (ARG)
    - Snipe class: (gold) Brazil (silver) United States (bronze) Uruguay
    - Lightning class: (gold) Chile (silver) United States (bronze) Brazil
    - Hobie 16 class: (gold) Puerto Rico (silver) Brazil (bronze) Guatemala
    - J/24 class: (gold) Brazil (silver) United States (bronze) Chile
  - Softball:
    - Women's tournament: (gold) United States (silver) Canada (bronze) Cuba
  - Triathlon:
    - Men's individual: (gold) Reinaldo Colucci (BRA) 1:48:02 (silver) Manuel Huerta (USA) 1:48:09 (bronze) Brent McMahon (CAN) 1:48:23
    - Women's individual: (gold) Sarah Haskins (USA) 1:57:37 (silver) Bárbara Riveros Díaz (CHI) 2:00:23 (bronze) Pamella Nascimento (BRA) 2:00:32
  - Water skiing:
    - Women's tricks: (gold) Whitney McClintock (CAN) 8390 points (silver) María Linares (COL) 7400 (bronze) Regina Jaquess (USA) 6090
    - Women's slalom: (gold) Jaquess 39.00 points (silver) McClintock 38.50 (bronze) Karen Stevens (CAN) 31.50
    - Women's jump: (gold) Jaquess 50.60 points (silver) McClintock 50.50 (bronze) Stevens 41.10
    - Men's tricks: (gold) Javier Andrés Julio (ARG) 10,140 points (silver) Jason McClintock (CAN) 9880 (bronze) Felipe Miranda (CHI) 9430
    - Men's slalom: (gold) Jonathan Travers (USA) 44.00 points (silver) McClintock 40.50 (bronze) Carlos Lamadrid (MEX) 39.00
    - Men's jump: (gold) Freddy Krueger (USA) 64.90 points (silver) Rodrigo Miranda (CHI) 64.50 (bronze) Felipe Miranda 62.70
  - Weightlifting:
    - Women's 48 kg: (gold) Lely Burgos (PUR) 170 kg (silver) Betsi Rivas (VEN) 169 kg (bronze) Katherine Mercado (COL) 165 kg
    - Men's 56 kg: (gold) Sergio Álvarez Boulet (CUB) 267 kg (silver) Sergio Rada (COL) 266 kg (bronze) José Lino Montes (MEX) 262 kg
    - Men's 62 kg: (gold) Óscar Figueroa (COL) 312 kg (silver) Jesús López (VEN) 296 kg (bronze) Diego Salazar (COL) 292 kg
  - Wrestling:
    - Men's Freestyle 55 kg: (gold) Juan Ramírez Beltré (DOM) (silver) Obenson Blanc (USA) (bronze) Steven Takahashi (CAN) & Juan Carlos Valverde (ECU)
    - Men's Freestyle 66 kg: (gold) Liván López (CUB) (silver) Pedro Soto (PUR) (bronze) Teyon Ware (USA) & Yoan Blanco (ECU)
    - Men's Freestyle 84 kg: (gold) Jacob Herbert (USA) (silver) Humberto Arencibia (CUB) (bronze) Jeffrey Adamson (CAN) & José Díaz (VEN)
    - Men's Freestyle 120 kg: (gold) Tervel Dlagnev (USA) (silver) Sunny Dhinsa (CAN) (bronze) Disney Rodríguez (CUB) & Carlos Félix (DOM)

==== Rugby union ====
- World Cup in New Zealand:
  - Final in Auckland: (gold) **New Zealand** 8–7 (silver) France
    - The All Blacks repeat their win over France in the 1987 Final and win the title for the second time.

==== Short track speed skating ====
- World Cup in Salt Lake City, United States:
  - Men's 500m: (gold) Jon Eley (GBR) 41.558 (silver) Charles Hamelin (CAN) 41.615 (bronze) Evgeny Kozulin (RUS) 41.751
  - Men's 1500m (2): (gold) Noh Jin-Kyu (KOR) 2:14.238 (silver) Kwak Yoon-Gy (KOR) 2:14.295 (bronze) J. R. Celski (USA) 2:14.343
    - Standings (after 2 of 8 races): (1) Noh & Hamelin 1000 points (3) Kwak & Lee Ho-Suk (KOR) 800
  - Men's 5000m relay: (gold) Canada (Michael Gilday, Charles Hamelin, François Hamelin, François-Louis Tremblay) 6:49.723 (silver) Great Britain (Eley, Richard Shoebridge, Paul Stanley, Jack Whelbourne) 6:50.277 (bronze) South Korea (Kwak, Lee Ho-Suk, Lee Jung-Su, Noh) 6:50.311
  - Women's 500m: (gold) Marianne St-Gelais (CAN) 44.382 (silver) Martina Valcepina (ITA) 45.645 (bronze) Jessica Smith (USA) 50.160
  - Women's 1500m (2): (gold) Katherine Reutter (USA) 2:24.005 (silver) Lee Eun-Byul (KOR) 2:24.032 (bronze) Li Jianrou (CHN) 2:24.124
    - Standings (after 2 of 8 races): (1) Reutter 2000 points (2) Lee 1440 (3) Valérie Maltais (CAN) 800
  - Women's 3000m relay: (gold) China (Fan Kexin, Li, Liu Qiuhong, Xiao Han) 4:12.774 (silver) South Korea (Cho Ha-Ri, Kim Dam Min, Lee, Son Soo-Min) 4:13.294 (bronze) Russia (Ekaterina Baranok, Olga Belikova, Tatiana Borodulina, Nina Yevteyeva) 4:18.694

==== Snooker ====
- Players Tour Championship – Event 8: Alex Higgins International Trophy in Killarney, Ireland:
  - Final: **Neil Robertson** (AUS) 4–1 Judd Trump (ENG)
    - Robertson wins his ninth professional title.
    - Order of Merit (after 8 of 12 events): (1) Robertson 25,600 (2) Ronnie O'Sullivan (ENG) 24,600 (3) Trump 18,900

==== Tennis ====
- ATP World Tour:
  - If Stockholm Open in Stockholm, Sweden:
    - Final: **Gaël Monfils** (FRA) def. Jarkko Nieminen (FIN) 7–5, 3–6, 6–2
      - Monfils wins his fourth ATP Tour title.
  - Kremlin Cup in Moscow, Russia:
    - Final: **Janko Tipsarević** (SRB) def. Viktor Troicki (SRB) 6–4, 6–2
      - Tipsarević wins his second ATP Tour title.
- WTA Tour:
  - Kremlin Cup in Moscow, Russia:
    - Final: **Dominika Cibulková** (SVK) def. Kaia Kanepi (EST) 3–6, 7–6(1), 7–5
      - Cibulková wins her first WTA Tour title.
  - BGL Luxembourg Open in Luxembourg City, Luxembourg:
    - Final: **Victoria Azarenka** (BLR) def. Monica Niculescu (ROM) 6–2, 6–2
      - Azarenka wins her eighth WTA Tour title.

=== October 22, 2011 (Saturday) ===
==== Alpine skiing ====
- Women's World Cup in Sölden, Austria:
  - Giant Slalom: (gold) Lindsey Vonn (USA) 2:24.43 (silver) Viktoria Rebensburg (GER) 2:24.47 (bronze) Elisabeth Görgl (AUT) 2:24.83
    - Vonn becomes the fifth woman to win a World Cup race in all five disciplines.

==== Auto racing ====
- V8 Supercars:
  - Gold Coast 600 in Surfers Paradise, Queensland (AUS unless stated):
    - Race 21: (1) Jamie Whincup/Sébastien Bourdais (FRA) (Triple Eight Race Engineering; Holden VE Commodore) (2) Will Davison/Mika Salo (FIN) (Ford Performance Racing; Ford FG Falcon) (3) Mark Winterbottom/Richard Lyons (GBR) (Ford Performance Racing; Ford FG Falcon)
      - Drivers' championship standings (after 21 of 28 races): (1) Whincup 2379 points (2) Craig Lowndes (Triple Eight Race Engineering; Holden VE Commodore) 2329 (3) Shane van Gisbergen (NZL) (Stone Brothers Racing; Ford FG Falcon) 1952

==== Baseball ====
- World Series:
  - Game 3 in Arlington, Texas: St. Louis Cardinals 16, Texas Rangers 7. Cardinals lead series 2–1.
    - Cardinals first baseman Albert Pujols becomes only the third player to hit three home runs in a World Series game, joining Babe Ruth (1926, Game 4 & 1928, Game 4) and Reggie Jackson (1977, Game 6).

==== Cricket ====
- Pakistan vs Sri Lanka in UAE:
  - 1st Test in Abu Dhabi, day 5: Sri Lanka 197 & 483 (168 overs; Kumar Sangakkara 211, Prasanna Jayawardene 120); Pakistan 511/6d & 21/1 (10 overs). **Match drawn; 3-match series tied 0–0.**
- West Indies in Bangladesh:
  - 1st Test in Chittagong, day 2: Bangladesh 255/4 (91 overs); West Indies. No play due to rain.
- New Zealand in Zimbabwe:
  - 2nd ODI in Harare: Zimbabwe 259/8 (50 overs; Brendan Taylor 107*); New Zealand 261/6 (48.2 overs; Martin Guptill 105). **New Zealand win by 4 wickets; lead 3-match series 2–0.**

==== Figure skating ====
- ISU Grand Prix:
  - Skate America in Ontario, California, United States:
    - Men: (gold) Michal Březina (CZE) 216.00 points (silver) Kevin van der Perren (BEL) 212.48 (bronze) Takahiko Kozuka (JPN) 212.09
    - Ice Dance: (gold) Meryl Davis/Charlie White (USA) 178.07 points (silver) Nathalie Péchalat/Fabian Bourzat (FRA) 156.29 (bronze) Isabella Tobias/Deividas Stagniūnas (LTU) 132.58

==== Football (soccer) ====
- UEFA Women's Euro 2013 qualifying Matchday 3:
  - Group 1:
    - Russia 4–1 Bosnia and Herzegovina
    - North Macedonia 0–9 Italy
    - Poland 2–0 Greece
      - Standings (after 2 matches unless stated): Italy, Russia 6 points, Poland 3, Greece 0 (1), Bosnia and Herzegovina 0, Macedonia 0 (1).
  - Group 2:
    - Turkey 0–0 Kazakhstan
    - Romania 0–3 Germany
      - Standings (after 3 matches unless stated): Germany 6 points (2 matches), Kazakhstan 4, Spain 3 (1), Switzerland 3 (2), Romania 3, Turkey 1.
  - Group 3:
    - Hungary 0–1 Iceland
    - Bulgaria 0–1 Northern Ireland
      - Standings (after 2 matches unless stated): Iceland 10 points (4 matches), Belgium 4, Norway 3, Northern Ireland 3 (1), Bulgaria 0, Hungary 0 (3).
  - Group 4:
    - Republic of Ireland 2–0 Israel
    - Wales 1–4 France
      - Standings (after 3 matches unless stated): France 9 points, Republic of Ireland 6, Scotland 3 (1), Wales 0 (2), Israel 0.
  - Group 5:
    - Ukraine 0–0 Slovakia
    - Finland 6–0 Estonia
      - Standings (after 1 match unless stated): Ukraine 4 points (2 matches), Finland, Belarus 3, Slovakia 1, Estonia 0 (3).
  - Group 6:
    - Croatia 0–3 Netherlands
    - Slovenia 1–2 Serbia
      - Standings (after 2 matches unless stated): Netherlands 6 points, England 4, Serbia 4 (3), Croatia 0 (1), Slovenia 0.
  - Group 7:
    - Czech Republic 1–0 Portugal
    - Denmark 3–0 Austria
      - Standings (after 2 matches): Denmark 6 points, Czech Republic 4, Portugal 3, Austria 1, Armenia 0.
- 2012 CAF Women's Pre-Olympic Tournament Final Round second leg (first leg score in parentheses): **Cameroon** 2–1 (1–2) Nigeria. 3–3 on aggregate; Cameroon win 4–3 on penalties, and qualify for the 2012 Olympics.
- (Armenia) Premier League, matchday 26 (team in **bold** qualify for Champions League):
  - Mika 1–0 Gandzasar
  - Ararat 1–2 **Ulisses**
  - Shirak 0–0 Pyunik
    - Standings: Ulisses 52 points, Gandzasar, Pyunik 42.
      - Ulisses win the title for the first time.

==== Horse racing ====
- Cox Plate in Melbourne: (gold) Pinker Pinker (trainer: Greg Eurell, jockey: Craig Williams) (silver) Jimmy Choux (trainer: John Bary, jockey: Jonathan Riddell) (bronze) Rekindled Interest (trainer: Jim Conlan, jockey: Dwayne Dunn)

==== Multi-sport events ====
- Pan American Games, day 9 in Guadalajara, Mexico:
  - Archery:
    - Men's individual: (gold) Brady Ellison (USA) (silver) Crispin Duenas (CAN) (bronze) Daniel Pineda (COL)
    - Women's individual: (gold) Alejandra Valencia (MEX) (silver) Miranda Leek (USA) (bronze) Aída Román (MEX)
  - Beach volleyball:
    - Men's tournament: (gold) Alison Cerutti/Emanuel Rego (BRA) (silver) Igor Hernández/Farid Mussa (VEN) (bronze) Santiago Etchegaray/Pablo Suárez (ARG)
  - Cycling:
    - Men's road race: (gold) Marc de Maar (AHO) 3:40:53 (silver) Miguel Ubeto (VEN) 3:40:53 (bronze) Arnold Alcolea (CUB) 3:41:48
    - Women's road race (all CUB): (gold) Arlenis Sierra 2:18:10 (silver) Yumari González 2:18:23 (bronze) Yudelmis Domínguez 2:18:23
  - Racquetball:
    - Women's singles: (gold) Paola Longoria (MEX) (silver) Rhonda Rajsich (USA) (bronze) Cheryl Gudinas (USA) & María Vargas (BOL)
    - Women's doubles: (gold) Samantha Salas/Longoria (MEX) (silver) Aimee Ruiz/Rajsich (USA) (bronze) Angela Grisar/Carla Muñoz (CHI) & Maria Córdova/Maria Muñoz (ECU)
    - Men's singles: (gold) R. O. Carson (USA) (silver) Gilberto Mejía (MEX) (bronze) Álvaro Beltrán (MEX) & Vincent Gagnon (CAN)
    - Men's doubles: (gold) Javier Moreno/Beltrán (MEX) (silver) Jorge Hirsekorn/César Castillo (VEN) (bronze) Kris Odegard/Tim Landeryou (CAN) & Chris Crowther/Shane Vanderson (USA)
  - Shooting:
    - Men's 25 metre rapid fire pistol: (gold) Emil Milev (USA) 603 points (silver) Juan Pérez (CUB) 591 (bronze) Franco Di Mauro (VEN) 590
    - Men's skeet: (gold) Vincent Hancock (USA) 147 points (silver) Guillermo Torres (CUB) 145 (bronze) Juan Miguel Rodríguez (CUB) 142
    - Women's 50 metre rifle three positions: (gold) Dianelys Pérez (CUB) 671.6 points (silver) Eglis de la Cruz (CUB) 670.3 (bronze) Sarah Beard (USA) 667.4
  - Swimming:
    - Men's marathon 10 kilometres: (gold) Richard Weinberger (CAN) 1:57:31.0 (silver) Arthur Frayler (USA) 1:57:31.3 (bronze) Guillermo Bertola (ARG) 1:57:33.9
    - Women's marathon 10 kilometres: (gold) Cecilia Biagioli (ARG) 2:04:11.5 (silver) Poliana Okimoto (BRA) 2:05:51.3 (bronze) Christine Jennings (USA) 2:05:52.2
  - Tennis:
    - Men's singles: (gold) Robert Farah Maksoud (COL) (silver) Rogério Dutra da Silva (BRA) (bronze) Víctor Estrella (DOM)
    - Men's doubles: (gold) Juan Sebastián Cabal/Farah Maksoud (COL) (silver) Julio César Campozano/Roberto Quiroz (ECU) (bronze) Nicholas Monroe/Greg Ouellette (USA)
  - Water skiing:
    - Women's overall: (gold) Regina Jaquess (USA) 2955.7 points (silver) Whitney McClintock (CAN) 2809.6 (bronze) Karen Stevens (CAN) 1862.8
    - Men's wakeboard: (gold) Andrew Adkison (USA) 80.00 points (silver) Aaron Rathy (CAN) 72.67 (bronze) Marcelo Giardi (BRA) 65.90
    - Men's overall: (gold) Javier Andrés Julio (ARG) 2870.7 points (silver) Felipe Miranda (CHI) 2800.8 (bronze) Rodrigo Miranda (CHI) 2591.1
  - Wrestling:
    - Women's Freestyle 48 kg: (gold) Carol Huynh (CAN) (silver) Clarissa Chun (USA) (bronze) Carolina Castillo (COL) & Patricia Bermúdez (ARG)
    - Women's Freestyle 55 kg: (gold) Helen Maroulis (USA) (silver) Tonya Verbeek (CAN) (bronze) Joice da Silva (BRA) & Lissette Antes (ECU)
    - Women's Freestyle 63 kg: (gold) Katerina Vidiaux (CUB) (silver) Elena Pirozhkov (USA) (bronze) Luz Vázquez (ARG) & Sandra Roa (COL)
    - Women's Freestyle 72 kg: (gold) Lisset Hechevarría (CUB) (silver) Aline Ferreira (BRA) (bronze) Jaramit Weffer (VEN) & Elsa Sánchez (DOM)

==== Short track speed skating ====
- World Cup in Salt Lake City, United States:
  - Men's 1000m: (gold) Kwak Yoon-Gy (KOR) 1:25.996 (silver) Noh Jin-Kyu (KOR) 1:26.596 (bronze) François-Louis Tremblay (CAN) 1:26.869
  - Men's 1500m (1): (gold) Charles Hamelin (CAN) 2:16.630 (silver) Lee Ho-Suk (KOR) 2:16.842 (bronze) Lee Jung-Su (KOR) 2:17.021
  - Women's 1000m: (gold) Yui Sakai (JPN) 1:31.260 (silver) Lana Gehring (USA) 1:31.278 (bronze) Alyson Dudek (USA) 1:31.494
  - Women's 1500m (1): (gold) Katherine Reutter (USA) 2:24.433 (silver) Valérie Maltais (CAN) 2:24.519 (bronze) Lee Eun-Byul (KOR) 2:24.606

=== October 21, 2011 (Friday) ===
==== Basketball ====
- Euroleague, Regular Season Matchday 1:
  - Group A: Bilbao Basket (Spain) 76–61 (Greece) Olympiacos

==== Cricket ====
- Pakistan vs Sri Lanka in UAE:
  - 1st Test in Abu Dhabi, day 4: Sri Lanka 197 & 298/5 (101 overs; Kumar Sangakkara 161*); Pakistan 511/6d. Sri Lanka trail by 16 runs with 5 wickets remaining.
- West Indies in Bangladesh:
  - 1st Test in Chittagong, day 1: Bangladesh 255/4 (91 overs); West Indies.

==== Multi-sport events ====
- Pan American Games, day 8 in Guadalajara, Mexico:
  - Archery:
    - Men's team: (gold) United States (silver) Mexico (bronze) Cuba
    - Women's team: (gold) Mexico (silver) United States (bronze) Cuba
  - Beach volleyball:
    - Women's tournament: (gold) Larissa França/Juliana Felisberta (BRA) (silver) Mayra García/Bibiana Candelas (MEX) (bronze) Yarleen Santiago/Yamileska Yantín (PUR)
  - Cycling:
    - Men's BMX: (gold) Connor Fields (USA) 34.245 (silver) Nick Long (USA) 34.907 (bronze) Andrés Jiménez (COL) 35.323
    - Women's BMX: (gold) Mariana Pajón (COL) 40.118 (silver) Arielle Martin (USA) 42.659 (bronze) María Díaz (ARG) 42.971
  - Shooting:
    - Men's 50 metre rifle three positions: (gold) Jason Parker (USA) 1249.1 points (silver) Matthew Wallace (USA) 1247.0 (bronze) Bruno Heck (BRA) 1245.0
    - Women's skeet: (gold) Kim Rhode (USA) 98 points (silver) Francisca Crovetto (CHI) 89 (bronze) Melisa Gil (ARG) 88
  - Squash:
    - Men's team: (gold) Mexico (silver) Canada (bronze) Brazil & United States
    - Women's team: (gold) Canada (silver) Colombia (bronze) Mexico & United States
  - Swimming:
    - Women's 50 metre freestyle: (gold) Lara Jackson (USA) 25.09 (silver) Graciele Herrmann (BRA) 25.23 (bronze) Madison Kennedy (USA) 25.24
    - Women's 4 × 100 metre medley relay: (gold) United States (Rachel Bootsma, Ann Chandler, Claire Donahue, Amanda Kendall) 4:01.00 (silver) Canada (Gabrielle Soucisse, Ashley McGregor, Erin Miller, Jen Beckberger) 4:07.04 (bronze) Brazil (Fabíola Molina, Tatiane Sakemi, Dayanara de Paula, Tatiana Lemos) 4:07.12
    - Men's 200 metre backstroke: (gold) Thiago Pereira (BRA) 1:57.19 (silver) Omar Pinzón (COL) 1:58.31 (bronze) Ryan Murphy (USA) 1:58.50
    - Men's 4 × 100 metre medley relay: (gold) Brazil (Guilherme Guido, Felipe França Silva, Gabriel Mangabeira, César Cielo) 3:34.58 (silver) United States (Eugene Godsoe, Marcus Titus, Chris Brady, Scot Robison) 3:37.17 (bronze) Argentina (Federico Grabich, Lucas Peralta, Marcos Barale, Lucas Del Piccolo) 3:44.51
  - Synchronized swimming:
    - Women's team: (gold) Canada (Marie-Pier Boudreau Gagnon, Jo-Annie Fortin, Chloé Isaac, Stéphanie Leclair, Tracy Little, Élise Marcotte, Karine Thomas, Valérie Welsh) 190.388 points (silver) United States (Morgan Fuller, Megan Hansley, Mary Killman, Mariya Koroleva, Michelle Moore, Leah Pinette, Lyssa Wallace, Alison Williams) 179.588 (bronze) Brazil (Giovana Stephan, Joseane Costa, Lara Teixeira, Lorena Molinos, Maria Bruno, Maria Pereira, Nayara Figueira, Pamela Nogueira, Jéssica Gonçalves) 176.425
  - Tennis:
    - Women's singles: (gold) Irina Falconi (USA) (silver) Monica Puig (PUR) (bronze) Christina McHale (USA)
    - Women's doubles: (gold) María Irigoyen/Florencia Molinero (ARG) (silver) Falconi/McHale (USA) (bronze) Catalina Castaño/Mariana Duque (COL)
    - Mixed doubles: (gold) Ana Paula de la Peña/Santiago González (MEX) (silver) Andrea Koch Benvenuto/Guillermo Rivera Aránguiz (CHI) (bronze) Ana Clara Duarte/Rogério Dutra da Silva (BRA)
  - Wrestling:
    - Men's Greco-Roman 60 kg: (gold) Luis Liendo (VEN) (silver) Joe Betterman (USA) (bronze) Hanser Meoque (CUB) & Jansel Ramírez (DOM)
    - Men's Greco-Roman 74 kg: (gold) Jorgisbell Álvarez (CUB) (silver) Ben Provisor (USA) (bronze) Juan Ángel Escobar (MEX) & Hansel Mercedes (DOM)
    - Men's Greco-Roman 96 kg: (gold) Yunior Estrada (CUB) (silver) Raúl Andrés Angulo (COL) (bronze) Yuri Maier (ARG) & Erwin Caraballo (VEN)

==== Rugby union ====
- World Cup in New Zealand:
  - Bronze Final in Auckland: Wales 18–21 (bronze) **Australia**

=== October 20, 2011 (Thursday) ===
==== Baseball ====
- World Series:
  - Game 2 in St. Louis: Texas Rangers 2, St. Louis Cardinals 1. Series tied 1–1.
- Major League Baseball awards:
  - Roberto Clemente Award: David Ortiz, Boston Red Sox

==== Basketball ====
- Euroleague, Regular Season Matchday 1:
  - Group B:
    - Panathinaikos (Greece) 98–77 (Spain) Unicaja
    - Brose Baskets (Germany) 96–65 (Croatia) KK Zagreb
  - Group C:
    - Partizan Mt:s Belgrade (Serbia) 73–84 (Turkey) Anadolu Efes
    - Spirou Charleroi (Belgium) 76–100 (Spain) Real Madrid
    - EA7 Emporio Armani (Italy) 89–82 (Israel) Maccabi Tel Aviv
  - Group D: Union Olimpija Ljubljana (Slovenia) 64–86 (Spain) FC Barcelona Regal

==== Cricket ====
- Pakistan vs Sri Lanka in UAE:
  - 1st Test in Abu Dhabi, day 3: Sri Lanka 197 & 47/1 (11 overs); Pakistan 511/6d (174.4 overs; Taufeeq Umar 236). Sri Lanka trail by 267 runs with 9 wickets remaining.
- England in India:
  - 3rd ODI in Mohali: England 298/4 (50 overs); India 300/5 (49.2 overs). **India win by 5 wickets; lead 5-match series 3–0.**
- New Zealand in Zimbabwe:
  - 1st ODI in Harare: Zimbabwe 231/6 (50 overs; Brendan Taylor 128*); New Zealand 232/1 (43.3 overs; Rob Nicol 108*). **New Zealand win by 9 wickets; lead 3-match series 1–0.**
    - Nicol becomes the seventh player to hit a century in his first ODI appearance.

==== Football (soccer) ====
- UEFA Europa League group stage Matchday 3 (team in **bold** advances to Round of 32):
  - Group A:
    - Tottenham Hotspur (England) 1–0 (Russia) Rubin Kazan
    - P.A.O.K. (Greece) 2–1 (Republic of Ireland) Shamrock Rovers
      - Standings (after 3 matches): Tottenham Hotspur 7 points, P.A.O.K. 5, Rubin Kazan 4, Shamrock Rovers 0.
  - Group B:
    - Standard Liège (Belgium) 0–0 (Ukraine) Vorskla Poltava
    - Hannover 96 (Germany) 2–2 (Denmark) Copenhagen
      - Standings (after 3 matches): Standard Liège, Hannover 96 5 points, Copenhagen 4, Vorskla Poltava 1.
  - Group C:
    - Rapid București (Romania) 0–1 (Poland) Legia Warsaw
    - Hapoel Tel Aviv (Israel) 0–1 (Netherlands) PSV Eindhoven
      - Standings (after 3 matches): PSV Eindhoven 9 points, Legia Warsaw 6, Rapid București 3, Hapoel Tel Aviv 0.
  - Group D:
    - **Sporting CP** (Portugal) 2–0 (Romania) Vaslui
    - Zürich (Switzerland) 1–1 (Italy) Lazio
      - Standings (after 3 matches): Sporting CP 9 points, Lazio, Vaslui, Zürich 2.
  - Group E:
    - Stoke City (England) 3–0 (Israel) Maccabi Tel Aviv
    - Dynamo Kyiv (Ukraine) 1–0 (Turkey) Beşiktaş
      - Standings (after 3 matches): Stoke City 7 points, Dynamo Kyiv 5, Beşiktaş 3, Maccabi Tel Aviv 1.
  - Group F:
    - Athletic Bilbao (Spain) 2–2 (Austria) Red Bull Salzburg
    - Slovan Bratislava (Slovakia) 0–0 (France) Paris Saint-Germain
      - Standings (after 3 matches): Athletic Bilbao 7 points, Paris Saint-Germain, Red Bull Salzburg 4, Slovan Bratislava 1.
  - Group G:
    - Malmö FF (Sweden) 1–4 (Ukraine) Metalist Kharkiv
    - AZ (Netherlands) 2–2 Austria Wien
      - Standings (after 3 matches): Metalist Kharkiv 7 points, AZ 5, Austria Wien 4, Malmö FF 0.
  - Group H:
    - Maribor (Slovenia) 1–1 (Portugal) Braga
    - Club Brugge (Belgium) 1–2 (England) Birmingham City
      - Standings (after 3 matches): Birmingham City, Club Brugge 6 points, Braga 4, Maribor 1.
  - Group I:
    - Rennes (France) 1–1 (Scotland) Celtic
    - Udinese (Italy) 2–0 (Spain) Atlético Madrid
      - Standings (after 3 matches): Udinese 7 points, Atlético Madrid 4, Rennes, Celtic 2.
  - Group J:
    - AEK Larnaca (Cyprus) 0–5 (Germany) Schalke 04
    - Maccabi Haifa (Israel) 5–0 (Romania) Steaua București
      - Standings (after 3 matches): Schalke 04 7 points, Maccabi Haifa 6, Steaua București 2, AEK Larnaca 1.
  - Group K:
    - Odense (Denmark) 1–4 (Netherlands) Twente
    - Wisła Kraków (Poland) 1–0 (England) Fulham
      - Standings (after 3 matches): Twente 7 points, Fulham 4, Odense, Wisła Kraków 3.
  - Group L:
    - Lokomotiv Moscow (Russia) 3–1 (Greece) AEK Athens
    - Sturm Graz (Austria) 0–2 (Belgium) Anderlecht
      - Standings (after 3 matches): Anderlecht 9 points, Lokomotiv Moscow 6, Sturm Graz 3, AEK Athens 0.
- Copa Sudamericana Round of 16 second leg (first leg scores in parentheses):
  - **Vélez Sarsfield** (Argentina) 1–1 (2–0) (Chile) Universidad Católica. Vélez Sársfield win 4–1 on points.
  - **Universitario** (Peru) 1–1 (1–1) (Argentina) Godoy Cruz. 2–2 on points, 2–2 on aggregate; Universitario win 3–2 on penalties.
- CONCACAF Champions League Group Stage Matchday 6 (teams in **bold** advance to Championship round):
  - Group A: Motagua (Honduras) 0–1 (United States) **Los Angeles Galaxy**
    - Final standings: Los Angeles Galaxy, (Mexico) **Morelia**, (Costa Rica) Alajuelense 12 points, Motagua 0.
  - Group B: **Isidro Metapán** (El Salvador) 3–2 (Honduras) Real España
    - Final standings: (Mexico) **Santos Laguna** 13 points, Isidro Metapán 9, (United States) Colorado Rapids 7, Real España 5.

==== Multi-sport events ====
- Pan American Games, day 7 in Guadalajara, Mexico:
  - Badminton:
    - Men's singles: (gold) Kevin Cordón (GUA) (silver) Osleni Guerrero (CUB) (bronze) Daniel Paiola (BRA) & Charles Pyne (JAM)
    - Women's singles: (gold) Michelle Li (CAN) (silver) Joycelyn Ko (CAN) (bronze) Victoria Montero (MEX) & Claudia Rivero (PER)
    - Mixed doubles: (gold) Grace Gao/Toby Ng (CAN) (silver) Halim Ho/Eva Lee (USA) (bronze) Claudia Rivero/Rodrigo Pacheco (PER) & Howard Bach/Paula Lynn Obañana (USA)
  - Cycling:
    - Men's Keirin: (gold) Fabián Puerta (COL) (silver) Hersony Canelón (VEN) (bronze) Leandro Botasso (ARG)
    - Women's Keirin: (gold) Daniela Larreal (VEN) (silver) Luz Gaxiola (MEX) (bronze) Dana Feiss (USA)
    - Women's Omnium: (gold) Angie González (VEN) 14 points (silver) Sofía Arreola (MEX) 17 (bronze) Marlies Mejías (CUB) 24
  - Shooting:
    - Men's double trap: (gold) Walton Eller (USA) 195 points (silver) José Torres (PUR) 185 (bronze) Luiz Fernando da Graça (BRA) 182
  - Swimming:
    - Men's 50 metre freestyle: (gold) César Cielo (BRA) 21.58 (silver) Bruno Fratus (BRA) 22.05 (bronze) Hanser García (CUB) 22.15
    - Men's 100 metre butterfly: (gold) Albert Subirats (VEN) 52.37 (silver) Eugene Godsoe (USA) 52.67 (bronze) Chris Brady (USA) 52.95
    - Women's 200 metre backstroke: (gold) Elizabeth Pelton (USA) 2:08.99 (silver) Bonnie Brandon (USA) 2:12.57 (bronze) Fernanda González (MEX) 2:13.56
    - Women's 200 metre breaststroke: (gold) Ashley McGregor (CAN) 2:28.04 (silver) Haley Spencer (USA) 2:29.30 (bronze) Michelle McKeehan (USA) 2:30.51
  - Synchronized swimming:
    - Women's duet: (gold) Élise Marcotte/Marie-Pier Boudreau Gagnon (CAN) 188.988 points (silver) Mary Killman/Mariya Koroleva (USA) 179.463 (bronze) Lara Teixeira/Nayara Figueira (BRA) 177.413
  - Table tennis:
    - Men's singles: (gold) Liu Song (ARG) (silver) Marcos Madrid (MEX) (bronze) Lin Ju (DOM) & Alberto Mino (ECU)
    - Women's singles: (gold) Zhang Mo (CAN) (silver) Wu Xue (DOM) (bronze) Lily Zhang (USA) & Ariel Hsing (USA)
  - Volleyball:
    - Women's tournament: (gold) Brazil (silver) Cuba (bronze) United States
  - Wrestling:
    - Men's Greco-Roman 55 kg: (gold) Gustavo Balart (CUB) (silver) Jorge Cardozo (VEN) (bronze) Juan Carlos López (COL) & Francisco Encarnación (DOM)
    - Men's Greco-Roman 66 kg: (gold) Pedro Isaac (CUB) (silver) Anyelo Mota (DOM) (bronze) Ulises Barragán (MEX) & Glenn Garrison (USA)
    - Men's Greco-Roman 84 kg: (gold) Pablo Shorey (CUB) (silver) Cristhian Mosquera (COL) (bronze) José Arias (DOM) & Yorgen Cova (VEN)
    - Men's Greco-Roman 120 kg: (gold) Mijaín López (CUB) (silver) Rafael Barreno (VEN) (bronze) Ramón García (DOM) & Victor Asprilla (COL)

=== October 19, 2011 (Wednesday) ===
==== Baseball ====
- World Series:
  - Game 1 in St. Louis: St. Louis Cardinals 3, Texas Rangers 2. Cardinals lead series 1–0.

==== Basketball ====
- Euroleague, Regular Season Matchday 1:
  - Group A:
    - Fenerbahçe Ülker (Turkey) 66–69 (Spain) Caja Laboral
    - NGC Cantù (Italy) 80–69 (France) SLUC Nancy
  - Group D:
    - UNICS Kazan (Russia) 71–79 (Italy) Montepaschi Siena
    - Asseco Prokom Gdynia (Poland) 72–76 (Turkey) Galatasaray

==== Cricket ====
- Pakistan vs Sri Lanka in UAE:
  - 1st Test in Abu Dhabi, day 2: Sri Lanka 197; Pakistan 259/1 (98 overs; Taufeeq Umar 109*). Pakistan lead by 62 runs with 9 wickets remaining in the 1st innings.
- Australia in South Africa:
  - 1st ODI in Centurion: Australia 183/4 (29/29 overs); South Africa 129 (22 overs). **Australia win by 93 runs (D/L); lead 3-match series 1–0.**

==== Football (soccer) ====
- UEFA Champions League group stage Matchday 3:
  - Group E:
    - Bayer Leverkusen (Germany) 2–1 (Spain) Valencia
    - Chelsea (England) 5–0 (Belgium) Genk
      - Standings (after 3 matches): Chelsea 7 points, Bayer Leverkusen 6, Valencia 2, Genk 1.
  - Group F:
    - Marseille (France) 0–1 (England) Arsenal
    - Olympiacos (Greece) 3–1 (Germany) Borussia Dortmund
      - Standings (after 3 matches): Arsenal 7 points, Marseille 6, Olympiacos 3, Borussia Dortmund 1.
  - Group G:
    - Shakhtar Donetsk (Ukraine) 2–2 (Russia) Zenit St. Petersburg
    - Porto (Portugal) 1–1 (Cyprus) APOEL
      - Standings (after 3 matches): APOEL 5 points, Zenit St. Petersburg, Porto 4, Shakhtar Donetsk 2.
  - Group H:
    - Milan (Italy) 2–0 (Belarus) BATE Borisov
    - Barcelona (Spain) 2–0 (Czech Republic) Viktoria Plzeň
      - Standings (after 3 matches): Milan, Barcelona 7 points, BATE Borisov, Viktoria Plzeň 1.
- Copa Sudamericana Round of 16:
  - First leg:
    - Flamengo (Brazil) 0–4 Universidad de Chile
    - São Paulo (Brazil) 1–0 (Paraguay) Libertad
  - Second leg (first leg score in parentheses): **Arsenal** (Argentina) 3–2 (0–0) (Paraguay) Olimpia. Arsenal win 4–1 on points.
- AFC Champions League Semi-finals first leg:
  - Suwon Samsung Bluewings (South Korea) 0–2 (Qatar) Al-Sadd
  - Al-Ittihad (Saudi Arabia) 2–3 (South Korea) Jeonbuk Hyundai Motors
- CONCACAF Champions League Group Stage Matchday 6 (teams in **bold** advance to Championship round):
  - Group B: **Santos Laguna** (Mexico) 2–0 (United States) Colorado Rapids
    - Standings: Santos Laguna 13 points (6 matches), Colorado Rapids 7 (6), (El Salvador) Isidro Metapán 6 (5), (Honduras) Real España 5 (5).
  - Group C: **UNAM** (Mexico) 1–0 (Panama) Tauro
    - Final standings: UNAM 11 points, (Canada) , **Toronto FC** 10, (United States) FC Dallas 7, Tauro 5.
  - Group D: Herediano (Costa Rica) 4–1 (Guatemala) Comunicaciones
    - Final standings: (Mexico) **Monterrey** 12 points, (United States) **Seattle Sounders FC** 10, Comunicaciones 7, Herediano 6.

==== Multi-sport events ====
- Pan American Games, day 6 in Guadalajara, Mexico:
  - Badminton:
    - Men's doubles: (gold) Howard Bach/Tony Gunawan (USA) (silver) Halim Ho/Sattawat Pongnairat (USA) (bronze) Andrés López/Lino Muñoz (MEX) & Adrian Liu/Derrick Ng (CAN)
    - Women's doubles: (gold) Alex Bruce/Michelle Li (CAN) (silver) Iris Wang/Rena Wang (USA) (bronze) Grace Gao/Joycelyn Ko (CAN) & Eva Lee/Paula Lynn Obañana (USA)
  - Cycling:
    - Men's sprint: (gold) Hersony Canelón (VEN) (silver) Fabián Puerta (COL) (bronze) Njisane Phillip (TRI)
    - Men's Omnium: (gold) Juan Esteban Arango (COL) 13 points (silver) Luis Mansilla (CHI) 20 (bronze) Walter Pérez (ARG) 28
  - Equestrian:
    - Individual dressage (all USA): (gold) Steffen Peters 82.690% (silver) Heather Blitz 81.917 (bronze) Marisa Festerling 77.545%
  - Rowing:
    - Women's lightweight single sculls: (gold) Jennifer Goldsack (USA) 7:48.77 (silver) Fabiana Beltrame (BRA) 7:55.42 (bronze) Yaima Velázquez (CUB) 8:02.59
    - Men's lightweight coxless four: (gold) Cuba (Liosbel Hernández, Liosmel Ramos, Manuel Suárez, Wilber Turro) 6:06.06 (silver) Argentina (Diego Gallina, Pablo Mahnic, Nicolai Fernández, Carlo Lauro) 6:06.21 (bronze) Chile (Rodrigo Muñoz, Fabián Oyarzún, Fernando Miralles, Félipe Leal) 6:06.36
    - Women's quadruple sculls: (gold) Argentina (Milka Kraljev, Maria Abalo, Maria Best, Maria Rohner) 6:34.46 (silver) Canada (Audra Vair, Isolda Penney, Barbara McCord, Melanie Kok) 6:37.68 (bronze) United States (Chelsea Smith, Michelle Sechser, Megan Walsh, Catherine Reddick) 6:39.36
    - Men's eight: (gold) United States (Derek Johnson, Jason Read, Robert Otto, Joseph Spencer, Stephen Kasprzyk, Blaise Didier, Matthew Wheeler, Michael Gennaro, Marcus McElhenney) 5:39.32 (silver) Canada (Steven Van Knotsenburg, Peter McClelland, Josh Morris, Benjamin de Wit, Kai Langerfeld, David Wakulich, Blake Parsons, Spencer Crowley, Mark Laidlaw) 5:41.01 (bronze) Argentina (Diego López, Mariano Sosa, Joaquín Iwan, Ariel Suárez, Rodrigo Murillo, Sebastián Fernández, Agustín Silvestro, Sebastián Claus, Joel Infante) 5:41.77
    - Men's single sculls: (gold) Ángel Fournier (CUB) 7:02.94 (silver) Patrick Loliger (MEX) 7:05.28 (bronze) Emilio Torres (VEN) 7:07.03
  - Shooting:
    - Men's 50 metre rifle prone: (gold) Michael McPhail (USA) 693.2 points (silver) Alex Suligoy (ARG) 691.5 (bronze) Jason Parker (USA) 690.8
    - Men's trap: (gold) Jean Pierre Brol (GUA) 146 points (silver) Danilo Caro (COL) 145 (bronze) Roberto Schmits (BRA) 143
    - Women's 25 metre pistol: (gold) Ana Luiza Mello (BRA) 773.9 points (silver) Sandra Uptagrafft (USA) 769.8 (bronze) Maribel Piñeda (VEN) 768.8
  - Swimming:
    - Men's 200 metre individual medley: (gold) Thiago Pereira (BRA) 1:58.07 (silver) Conor Dwyer (USA) 1:58.64 (bronze) Henrique Rodrigues (BRA) 2:03.41
    - Men's 4 × 200 metre freestyle relay: (gold) United States (Dwyer, Scot Robison, Charles Houchin, Matthew Patton) 7:15.07 (silver) Brazil (André Schultz, Nicolas Oliveira, Leonardo de Deus, Pereira) 7:21.96 (bronze) Venezuela (Daniele Tirabassi, Cristián Quintero, Crox Acuña, Marcos Lavado) 7:23.41
    - Women's 100 metre freestyle: (gold) Amanda Kendall (USA) 54.75 (silver) Erika Erndl (USA) 55.04 (bronze) Arlene Semeco (VEN) 55.43
    - Women's 200 metre butterfly: (gold) Kim Vandenberg (USA) 2:10.54 (silver) Lyndsay DePaul (USA) 2:12.34 (bronze) Rita Medrano (MEX) 2:12.43
    - Women's 800 metre freestyle: (gold) Kristel Köbrich (CHI) 8:34.71 (silver) Ashley Twichell (USA) 8:38.38 (bronze) Andreina Pinto (VEN) 8:44.55

=== October 18, 2011 (Tuesday) ===
==== Baseball ====
- Nippon Professional Baseball news: The Chunichi Dragons clinch their second consecutive Central League title with a 3–3 draw against the Yokohama BayStars, and earn a one-win and home field advantage for Climax Series Final Stage.

==== Cricket ====
- Pakistan vs Sri Lanka in UAE:
  - 1st Test in Abu Dhabi, day 1: Sri Lanka 197 (74.1 overs, Junaid Khan 5/38); Pakistan 27/0 (8 overs). Pakistan trail by 170 runs with 10 wickets remaining in the 1st innings.
- West Indies in Bangladesh:
  - 3rd ODI in Chittagong: West Indies 61 (22 overs); Bangladesh 62/2 (20 overs). **Bangladesh win by 8 wickets; West Indies win 3-match series 2–1.**

==== Football (soccer) ====
- UEFA Champions League group stage Matchday 3:
  - Group A:
    - Napoli (Italy) 1–1 (Germany) Bayern Munich
    - Manchester City (England) 2–1 (Spain) Villarreal
      - Standings (after 3 matches): Bayern Munich 7 points, Napoli 5, Manchester City 4, Villarreal 0.
  - Group B:
    - CSKA Moscow (Russia) 3–0 (Turkey) Trabzonspor
    - Lille (France) 0–1 (Italy) Internazionale
      - Standings (after 3 matches): Internazionale 6 points, CSKA Moscow, Trabzonspor 4, Lille 2.
  - Group C:
    - Oțelul Galați (Romania) 0–2 (England) Manchester United
    - Basel (Switzerland) 0–2 (Portugal) Benfica
      - Standings (after 3 matches): Benfica 7 points, Manchester United 5, Basel 4, Oțelul Galați 0.
  - Group D:
    - Real Madrid (Spain) 4–0 (France) Lyon
    - Dinamo Zagreb (Croatia) 0–2 (Netherlands) Ajax
      - Standings (after 3 matches): Real Madrid 9 points, Ajax, Lyon 4, Dinamo Zagreb 0.
- AFC Cup Semi-finals second leg (first leg scores in parentheses):
  - **Al-Kuwait** 3–3 (2–0) (Iraq) Arbil. Al-Kuwait win 5–3 on aggregate.
  - Al-Wehdat (Jordan) 1–1 (0–1) (Uzbekistan) **Nasaf Qarshi**. Nasaf Qarshi win 2–1 on aggregate.
- CONCACAF Champions League Group Stage Matchday 6 (teams in **bold** advance to Championship round):
  - Group A: **Morelia** (Mexico) 2–1 (Costa Rica) Alajuelense
    - Standings: Morelia, Alajuelense 12 points (6 matches), (United States) Los Angeles Galaxy 9 (5), (Honduras) Motagua 0 (5).
  - Group C: FC Dallas (United States) 0–3 (Canada) **Toronto FC**
    - Standings: Toronto FC 10 points (6 matches), (Mexico) UNAM 8 (5), FC Dallas 7 (6), (Panama) Tauro 5 (5).
  - Group D: **Seattle Sounders FC** (United States) 1–2 (Mexico) **Monterrey**
    - Standings: Monterrey 12 points (6 matches), Seattle Sounders 10 (6), (Guatemala) Comunicaciones 7 (5), (Costa Rica) Herediano 3 (5).

==== Multi-sport events ====
- Pan American Games, day 5 in Guadalajara, Mexico:
  - Cycling:
    - Women's team pursuit: (gold) Canada (Laura Brown, Jasmin Glaesser, Stephanie Roorda) 3:21.448 (silver) Cuba (Yudelmis Domínguez, Yoanka González, Dalila Rodríguez) 3:25.335 (bronze) Colombia (María Luisa Calle, Sérika Gulumá, Lorena Vargas) 3:26.888
    - Women's sprint: (gold) Lisandra Guerra (CUB) (silver) Daniela Larreal (VEN) (bronze) Diana García (COL)
  - Gymnastics:
    - Women's rhythmic individual club: (gold) Cynthia Valdez (MEX) 25.775 points (silver) Angélica Kvieczynski (BRA) 25.150 (bronze) Mariam Chamilova (CAN) 24.525
    - Women's rhythmic individual ribbon: (gold) Julie Zetlin (USA) 25.775 points (silver) Valdez 25.075 (bronze) Ana Carrasco (ARG) 24.600
    - Women's rhythmic group 3 ribbons + 2 hoops: (gold) Brazil 24.775 points (silver) Canada 24.650 (bronze) United States 24.625
    - Men's trampoline: (gold) Keegan Soehn (CAN) 55.535 points (silver) Rafael Andrade (BRA) 52.265 (bronze) José Alberto Vargas (MEX) 21.130
    - Women's trampoline: (gold) Rosannagh MacLennan (CAN) 53.975 points (silver) Dakota Earnest (USA) 51.060 (bronze) Alaina Williams (USA) 48.380
  - Rowing:
    - Women's single sculls: (gold) Margot Shumway (USA) 7:53.05 (silver) Maria Best (ARG) 7:55.55 (bronze) Isolda Penney (CAN) 8:06.88
    - Men's lightweight double sculls: (gold) Alan Armenta/Gerardo Sánchez (MEX) 6:24.52 (silver) Yunior Pérez/Eyder Batista (CUB) 6:27.07 (bronze) Travis King/Terence McKall (CAN) 6:29.27
    - Women's lightweight double sculls: (gold) Analicia Ramírez/Lila Pérez Rul (MEX) 7:16.04 (silver) Yaima Velázquez/Yoslaine Domínguez (CUB) 7:17.77 (bronze) Michelle Sechser/Chelsea Smith (USA) 7:18.88
    - Men's coxless pair: (gold) Michael Gennaro/Robert Otto (USA) 6:47.07 (silver) João Borges Junior/Alexis Mestre (BRA) 6:48.74 (bronze) Peter McClelland/Steven Van Knotsenburg (CAN) 6:50.80
    - Men's quadruple sculls: (gold) Argentina (Alejandro Cucchietti, Santiago Fernández, Cristian Rosso, Ariel Suárez) 5:51.20 (silver) Cuba (Janier Concepción, Yoennis Hernández, Eduardo Rubio, Adrian Oquendo) 5:51.69 (bronze) Mexico (Horacio Rangel, Edgar Valenzuela, Patrick Loliger, Santiago Santaella) 5:59.58
  - Shooting:
    - Men's 50 metre pistol: (gold) Sergio Sánchez (GUA) 648.9 points (silver) Daryl Szarenski (USA) 640.0 (bronze) Júlio Almeida (BRA) 639.9
    - Women's trap: (gold) Miranda Wilder (USA) 87 points (silver) Lindsay Boddez (CAN) 86 (bronze) Kayle Browning (USA) 85
  - Swimming:
    - Men's 200 metre freestyle: (gold) Brett Fraser (CAY) 1:47.18 (silver) Shaune Fraser (CAY) 1:48.29 (bronze) Ben Hockin (PAR) 1:48.48
    - Men's 200 metre breaststroke: (gold) Sean Mahoney (USA) 2:11.62 (silver) Clark Burckle (USA) 2:12.60 (bronze) Thiago Pereira (BRA) 2:13.58
    - Men's 1500 metre freestyle: (gold) Arthur Frayler (USA) 15:19.59 (silver) Ryan Feeley (USA) 15:22.19 (bronze) Juan Martín Pereyra (ARG) 15:26.20
    - Women's 200 metre individual medley: (gold) Julia Smit (USA) 2:13.73 (silver) Alia Atkinson (JAM) 2:14.75 (bronze) Joanna Maranhão (BRA) 2:15.08
    - Women's 4 × 200 metre freestyle relay: (gold) United States (Catherine Breed, Elizabeth Felton, Chelsea Nauta, Amanda Kendall) 8:01.18 (silver) Brazil (Maranhão, Jéssica Cavalheiro, Manuella Lyrio, Tatiana Lemos) 8:09.89 (bronze) Mexico (Liliana Ibáñez, Patricia Castañeda Miyamoto, Fernanda González, Susana Escobar) 8:12.19
  - Taekwondo:
    - Women's +67 kg: (gold) Glenhis Hernández (CUB) (silver) Nikki Martínez (PUR) (bronze) Guadalupe Ruiz (MEX) & Lauren Hamon (USA)
    - Men's +80 kg: (gold) Robelis Despaigne (CUB) (silver) Juan Carlos Díaz (VEN) (bronze) François Coulombe (CAN) & Stephen Lambdin (USA)

==== Surfing ====
- Men's World Tour:
  - Rip Curl Pro in Peniche, Portugal: (1) Adriano De Souza (BRA) (2) Kelly Slater (USA) (3) Taj Burrow (AUS) & Bede Durbidge (AUS)
    - Standings (after 9 of 11 events): (1) Slater 58,150 points (2) Owen Wright (AUS) 45,650 (3) De Souza 42,450

=== October 17, 2011 (Monday) ===
==== Basketball ====
- Euroleague Group B: Žalgiris (Lithuania) 74–87 (Russia) CSKA Moscow

==== Cricket ====
- England in India:
  - 2nd ODI in Delhi: England 237 (48.2 overs); India 238/2 (36.4 overs; Virat Kohli 112*). **India win by 8 wickets; lead 5-match series 2–0.**
- New Zealand in Zimbabwe:
  - 2nd T20I in Harare: New Zealand 187/3 (18/18 overs); Zimbabwe 154 (16.5 overs). **New Zealand win by 34 runs (D/L); win 2-match series 2–0.**

==== Multi-sport events ====
- Pan American Games, day 4 in Guadalajara, Mexico:
  - Cycling:
    - Men's team pursuit: (gold) Colombia (Juan Esteban Arango, Edwin Ávila, Arles Castro, Weimar Roldán) 3:59.236 (silver) Chile (Antonio Cabrera, Gonzalo Miranda, Pablo Seisdedos, Luis Sepúlveda) overlapped (bronze) Argentina (Maximiliano Almada, Marcos Crespo, Walter Pérez, Eduardo Sepúlveda) overlapped Mexico
    - Men's team sprint: (gold) Venezuela (Hersony Canelón, César Marcano, Ángel Pulgar) 43.188 (silver) United States (Michael Blatchford, Dean Tracy, James Watkins) 44.036 (bronze) Colombia (Jonathan Marín, Fabián Puerta, Christian Tamayo) 45.080
    - Women's team sprint: (gold) Daniela Larreal/Mariestela Vilera (VEN) 33.611 (silver) Diana García/Juliana Gaviria (COL) 34.049 (bronze) Nancy Contreras/Luz Gaxiola (MEX) 34.617
  - Gymnastics:
    - Women's rhythmic individual ball: (gold) Julie Zetlin (USA) 24.950 points (silver) Cynthia Valdez (MEX) 24.825 (bronze) Angélica Kvieczynski (BRA) 24.700
    - Women's rhythmic individual hoop: (gold) Valdez 25.800 points (silver) Zetlin 25.500 (bronze) Kvieczynski 25.000
    - Women's rhythmic group 5 balls: (gold) Brazil 25.050 points (silver) United States 24.850 (bronze) Canada 24.625
  - Rowing:
    - Men's double sculls: (gold) Cristian Rosso/Ariel Suárez (ARG) 6:26.55 (silver) Janier Concepción/Yoennis Hernández (CUB) 6:32.54 (bronze) César Amaris/José Güipe (VEN) 6:36.81
    - Men's coxless four: (gold) Argentina (Sebastián Fernández, Joaquín Iwan, Rodrigo Murillo, Agustín Silvestro) 6:04.41 (silver) Canada (David Wakulich, Kai Langerfeld, Blake Parsons, Spencer Crowley) 6:05.65 (bronze) Cuba (Yenser Basilio, Dionnis Carrion, Jorber Avila, Solaris Freire) 6:06.51
    - Women's double sculls: (gold) Yariulvis Cobas/Aimeé Hernández (CUB) 7:13.76 (silver) Megan Walsh/Catherine Reddick (USA) 7:14.34 (bronze) Barbara McCord/Audra Vair (CAN) 7:16.29
    - Women's coxless pair: (gold) Maria Abalo/Maria Best (ARG) 7:24.57 (silver) Monica George/Megan Smith (USA) 7:29.05 (bronze) Sarah Bonikowsky/Sandra Kisil (CAN) 7:32.74
  - Shooting:
    - Men's 10 metre air rifle: (gold) Matthew Rawlings (USA) 696.7 points (silver) Jonathan Hall (USA) 696.6 (bronze) Gonzalo Moncada (CHI) 688.9
    - Women's 10 metre air rifle: (gold) Emily Caruso (USA) 497.8 points (silver) Eglis de la Cruz (CUB) 497.3 (bronze) Rosa Peña (MEX) 494.7
  - Squash:
    - Men's singles: (gold) Miguel Rodríguez (COL) (silver) César Salazar (MEX) (bronze) Shawn Delierre (CAN) & Arturo Salazar (MEX)
    - Men's doubles: (gold) Arturo Salazar/Eric Gálvez (MEX) (silver) Chris Gordon/Julian Illingworth (USA) (bronze) Esteban Casarino/Nicolás Caballero (PAR) & Hernán D'Arcangelo/Roberto Pezzota (ARG)
    - Women's singles: (gold) Samantha Terán (MEX) (silver) Samantha Cornett (CAN) (bronze) Miranda Ranieri (CAN) & Nicolette Fernandes (GUY)
    - Women's doubles: (gold) Terán/Nayelly Hernández (MEX) (silver) Catalina Peláez/Silvia Angulo (COL) (bronze) Ranieri/Stephanie Edmison (CAN) & Olivia Blatchford/Maria Ubina (USA)
  - Swimming:
    - Men's 100 metre backstroke: (gold) Thiago Pereira (BRA) 54.56 (silver) Eugene Godsoe (USA) 54.61 (bronze) Guilherme Guido (BRA) 54.81
    - Men's 200 metre butterfly: (gold) Leonardo de Deus (BRA) 1:57.92 (silver) Daniel Madwed (USA) 1:58.52 (bronze) Kaio de Almeida (BRA) 1:58.78
    - Women's 100 metre breaststroke: (gold) Ann Chandler (USA) 1:07.90 (silver) Ashley Wanland (USA) 1:08.55 (bronze) Ashley McGregor (CAN) 1:08.96
    - Women's 400 metre freestyle: (gold) Gillian Ryan (USA) 4:11.58 (silver) Andreina Pinto (VEN) 4:11.81 (bronze) Kristel Köbrich (CHI) 4:13.31
  - Table tennis:
    - Men's team: (gold) Brazil (silver) Argentina (bronze) Cuba & Mexico
    - Women's team: (gold) Dominican Republic (silver) Venezuela (bronze) Colombia & United States
  - Taekwondo:
    - Women's 67 kg: (gold) Melissa Pagnotta (CAN) (silver) Paige McPherson (USA) (bronze) Katherine Rodríguez (DOM) & Taimi Castellanos (CUB)
    - Men's 80 kg: (gold) Sebastián Crismanich (ARG) (silver) Carlos Vásquez (VEN) (bronze) Stuardo Solórzano (GUA) & Uriel Adriano (MEX)

=== October 16, 2011 (Sunday) ===
==== Auto racing ====
- Formula One:
  - Korean Grand Prix in Yeongam, South Korea: (1) Sebastian Vettel (GER) (Red Bull–Renault) (2) Lewis Hamilton (GBR) (McLaren–Mercedes) (3) Mark Webber (AUS) (Red Bull-Renault)
    - Drivers' championship standings (after 16 of 19 races): (1) Vettel 349 points (2) Jenson Button (GBR) (McLaren-Mercedes) 222 (3) Fernando Alonso (ESP) (Ferrari) 212
    - Constructors' championship standings: (1) Red Bull 558 points (2) McLaren 418 (3) Ferrari 310
      - Red Bull win their second consecutive title.
- IndyCar Series:
  - IZOD IndyCar World Championships in Las Vegas, Nevada: No official results
    - 2005 and 2011 Indianapolis 500 winner Dan Wheldon is killed in a multiple-car crash on lap 11 of the race, which was stopped and later abandoned.
    - Final drivers' championship standings: (1) Dario Franchitti (GBR) (Chip Ganassi Racing) 573 points (2) Will Power (AUS) (Team Penske) 555 (3) Scott Dixon (NZL) (Chip Ganassi Racing) 518
      - Franchitti wins his third consecutive title, and a record fourth in five years.

==== Baseball ====
- Major League Baseball postseason:
  - National League Championship Series Game 6 in Milwaukee: St. Louis Cardinals 12, Milwaukee Brewers 6. **Cardinals win series 4–2.**
    - The Cardinals win their first NLCS since 2006, and their 18th NL pennant overall. Cardinals third baseman David Freese is named series MVP after hitting .545 with three home runs and nine RBIs in six games.

==== Cricket ====
- Australia in South Africa:
  - 2nd T20I in Johannesburg: Australia 147/8 (20 overs); South Africa 148/7 (19.1 overs). **South Africa win by 3 wickets; 2-match series drawn 1–1.**

==== Equestrianism ====
- Eventing – Étoiles de Pau in Pau (CCI 4*): (gold) William Fox-Pitt (GBR) on Oslo (silver) Andrew Nicholson (NZL) on Mr Cruise Control (bronze) Fox-Pitt on Lionheart
- Show jumping – World Cup Western European League:
  - 1st competition in Oslo (CSI 5*-W): (gold) Pius Schwizer (SUI) on Carlina (silver) Philipp Weishaupt (GER) on Souvenir (bronze) Luciana Diniz (POR) on Winningmood

==== Fencing ====
- World Championships in Catania, Italy:
  - Women's team épée: (gold) Romania (silver) China (bronze) Italy
  - Men's team foil: (gold) China (silver) France (bronze) Germany

==== Football (soccer) ====
- CAF Champions League Semifinals second leg (first leg score in parentheses): Enyimba (Nigeria) 0–0 (0–1) (Morocco) **Wydad Casablanca**. Wydad Casablanca win 1–0 on aggregate.
- CAF Confederation Cup Semifinals first leg: Inter Luanda (Angola) 2–1 (Morocco) Maghreb de Fès
- (Faroe Islands) Premier League, matchday 26 (team in **bold** qualify for Champions League, teams in italics qualify for Europa League):
  - NSÍ Runavík 1–2 **B36 Tórshavn**
  - EB/Streymur 1–0 B71 Sandoy
    - Standings: B36 64 points, EB/Streymur 60, Víkingur 56, NSÍ 38.
      - B36 win the title for the ninth time.

==== Golf ====
- PGA Tour
  - Fall Series: McGladrey Classic in Sea Island, Georgia:
    - Winner: Ben Crane (USA) 265 (−15)^{PO}
      - Crane defeats Webb Simpson (USA) on the second playoff hole to win his fourth PGA Tour title.
- European Tour:
  - Portugal Masters in Vilamoura, Portugal:
    - Winner: Tom Lewis (ENG) 267 (−21)
      - In his third professional tournament, Lewis wins his first European Tour title.
- LPGA Tour:
  - Sime Darby LPGA Malaysia in Kuala Lumpur:
    - Winner: Na Yeon Choi (KOR) 269 (−15)
      - Choi wins her fifth LPGA Tour title.
- Champions Tour:
  - AT&T Championship in San Antonio:
    - Winner: Fred Couples (USA) 193 (−23)
      - Couples wins his sixth Champions Tour title.

==== Gymnastics ====
- World Artistic Gymnastics Championships in Tokyo, Japan:
  - Men:
    - Vault: (gold) Yang Hak-Seon (KOR) 16.566 points (silver) Anton Golotsutskov (RUS) 16.366 (bronze) Makoto Okiguchi (JPN) 16.291
    - Parallel bars: (gold) Danell Leyva (USA) 15.633 points (silver) Vasileios Tsolakidis (GRE) & Zhang Chenglong (CHN) 15.533
    - Horizontal bar: (gold) Zou Kai (CHN) 16.441 points (silver) Zhang 16.366 (bronze) Kōhei Uchimura (JPN) 16.333
      - Zou wins his second title of the championships, second horizontal bar title and fifth world title overall.
  - Women:
    - Balance beam: (gold) Sui Lu (CHN) 15.866 points (silver) Yao Jinnan (CHN) 15.233 (bronze) Jordyn Wieber (USA) 15.133
    - Floor: (gold) Ksenia Afanasyeva (RUS) 15.133 points (silver) Sui 15.066 (bronze) Aly Raisman (USA) 15.000
      - Afanasyeva wins her second world title.

==== Motorcycle racing ====
- Moto GP:
  - Australian Grand Prix in Phillip Island, Australia:
    - MotoGP (all Honda): (1) Casey Stoner (AUS) (2) Marco Simoncelli (ITA) (3) Andrea Dovizioso (ITA)
      - Riders' championship standings (after 16 of 18 races): (1) Stoner 325 points (2) Jorge Lorenzo (ESP) (Yamaha) 260 (3) Dovizioso 212
        - Stoner wins his second world title.
    - Moto2: (1) Alex de Angelis (SMR) (Motobi) (2) Stefan Bradl (GER) (Kalex) (3) Marc Márquez (ESP) (Suter)
      - Riders' championship standings (after 15 of 17 races): (1) Bradl 254 points (2) Márquez 251 (3) Andrea Iannone (ITA) (Suter) 165
    - 125cc: (1) Sandro Cortese (GER) (Aprilia) (2) Luis Salom (ESP) (Aprilia) (3) Johann Zarco (FRA) (Derbi)
      - Riders' championship standings (after 15 of 17 races): (1) Nicolás Terol (ESP) (Aprilia) 271 points (2) Zarco 246 (3) Cortese 205
- Superbike:
  - Portimão World Championship round in Portimão, Portugal:
    - Race 1: (1) Carlos Checa (ESP) (Ducati 1098R) (2) Sylvain Guintoli (FRA) (Ducati 1098R) (3) Jonathan Rea (GBR) (Honda CBR1000RR)
    - Race 2: (1) Marco Melandri (ITA) (Yamaha YZF-R1) (2) Eugene Laverty (IRL) (Yamaha YZF-R1) (3) Rea
      - Final riders' championship standings: (1) Checa 505 points (2) Melandri 395 (3) Max Biaggi (ITA) (Aprilia RSV4) 303
- Supersport:
  - Portimão World Championship round in Portimão, Portugal: (1) Chaz Davies (GBR) (Yamaha YZF-R6) (2) David Salom (ESP) (Kawasaki Ninja ZX-6R) (3) James Ellison (GBR) (Honda CBR600RR)
    - Final riders' championship standings: (1) Davies 206 points (2) Salom 156 (3) Fabien Foret (FRA) (Honda CBR600RR) 148

==== Multi-sport events ====
- Pan American Games, day 3 in Guadalajara, Mexico:
  - Cycling:
    - Men's road time trial: (gold) Marlon Pérez Arango (COL) 49:56.93 (silver) Matías Médici (ARG) 50:00.98 (bronze) Carlos Oyarzun (CHI) 50:27.60
    - Women's road time trial: (gold) María Calle (COL) 28:04.82 (silver) Evelyn García (ESA) 28:13.76 (bronze) Laura Brown (CAN) 28:24.00
  - Equestrian:
    - Team dressage: (gold) United States (Steffen Peters, Heather Blitz, Cesar Parra, Marisa Festerling) 75.754% (silver) Canada (Thomas Dvorak, Crystal Kroetch, Tina Irwin, Roberta Byng-Morris) 70.413% (bronze) Colombia (Marco Bernal, Constanza Jaramillo, Juan Mauricio Sanchez, Maria Garcia) 69.614%
  - Gymnastics:
    - Women's rhythmic group all-around: (gold) Brazil 48.575 points (silver) Canada 47.950 (bronze) Cuba 47.175
  - Modern pentathlon:
    - Men's modern pentathlon: (gold) Óscar Soto (MEX) 5728 points (silver) Andrei Gheorghe (GUA) 5672 (bronze) Esteban Bustos (CHI) 5656
  - Shooting:
    - Men's 10 metre air pistol: (gold) Daryl Szarenski (USA) 681.7 points (silver) Roger Daniel (TRI) 676.1 (bronze) Júlio Almeida (BRA) 675.2
    - Women's 10 metre air pistol: (gold) Dorothy Ludwig (CAN) 476.8 points (silver) Maribel Pineda (VEN) 476.7 (bronze) Sandra Uptagrafft (USA) 476.3
  - Swimming:
    - Women's 100 metre backstroke: (gold) Rachel Bootsma (USA) 1:00.37 (silver) Elizabeth Pelton (USA) 1:01.12 (bronze) Fernanda González (MEX) 1:02.00
    - Men's 100 metre freestyle: (gold) César Cielo (BRA) 47.84 (silver) Hanser García (CUB) 48.34 (bronze) Shaune Fraser (CAY) 48.63
    - Women's 200 metre freestyle: (gold) Catherine Breed (USA) 2:00.08 (silver) Chelsea Nauta (USA) 2:00.62 (bronze) Andreina Pinto (VEN) 2:00.79
    - Men's 100 metre breaststroke: (gold) Felipe França Silva (BRA) 1:00.34 (silver) Felipe Lima (BRA) 1:00.99 (bronze) Marcus Titus (USA) 1:01.12
    - Men's 4 × 100 metre freestyle relay: (gold) Brazil (Bruno Fratus, Nicholas Santos, Cielo, Nicolas Oliveira) 3:14.65 (silver) United States (Will Copeland, Chris Brady, Bobby Savulich, Scot Robison) 3:15.62 (bronze) Venezuela (Octavio Alesi, Crox Acuña, Cristian Quintero, Albert Subirats) 3:19.92
  - Taekwondo:
    - Men's 68 kg: (gold) Jhohanny Jean (DOM) (silver) Ángel Mora (CUB) (bronze) Mario Guerra (CHI) & Terrence Jennings (USA)
    - Women's 57 kg: (gold) Irma Contreras (MEX) (silver) Doris Patiño (COL) (bronze) Yeny Contreras (CHI) & Nicole Palma (USA)

==== Rugby league ====
- Autumn International Series:
  - Scotland 26–6 Ireland in Glasgow, Scotland

==== Rugby union ====
- World Cup in New Zealand:
  - Semifinals in Auckland: Australia 6–20 **New Zealand**
    - The All Blacks advance to the final for the third time, and will play France in a repeat of the 1987 Final at the same venue.

==== Tennis ====
- ATP World Tour:
  - Shanghai Rolex Masters in Shanghai, China:
    - Final: **Andy Murray** (GBR) def. David Ferrer (ESP) 7–5, 6–4
      - Murray wins a title for the third consecutive week, for his fifth title of the year and 21st of his career.
      - Murray's victory also moves him into third place in the ATP rankings, ahead of Roger Federer (SUI), who is ranked outside the top three for the first time since July 2003.
- WTA Tour:
  - Generali Ladies Linz in Linz, Austria:
    - Final: **Petra Kvitová** (CZE) def. Dominika Cibulková (SVK) 6–4, 6–1
      - Kvitová wins her fifth title of the year, and sixth of her career.
  - HP Open in Osaka, Japan:
    - Final: **Marion Bartoli** (FRA) def. Samantha Stosur (AUS) 6–3, 6–1
      - Bartoli wins the seventh title of her career.

=== October 15, 2011 (Saturday) ===
==== Auto racing ====
- Sprint Cup Series – Chase for the Sprint Cup:
  - Bank of America 500 in Concord, North Carolina: (1) (Wisconsin) Matt Kenseth (Ford; Roush Fenway Racing) (2) (Nevada) Kyle Busch (Toyota; Joe Gibbs Racing) (3) (Missouri) Carl Edwards (Ford; Roush Fenway Racing)
    - Drivers' championship standings (after 31 of 36 races): (1) Edwards 2203 points (2) (California) Kevin Harvick (Chevrolet; Richard Childress Racing) 2198 (3) Kenseth 2196

==== Baseball ====
- World Cup in Panama:
  - 7th place game in Santiago de Veraguas: Panama 3–8 **Venezuela**
  - 5th place game in Chitré: **Australia** 3–2 South Korea
  - Bronze medal game in Panama City: Canada – United States — cancelled due to rain
  - Final in Panama City: (gold) **Netherlands** 2–1 (silver) Cuba
    - The Netherlands become the first European nation to win the World Cup since Great Britain in 1938.
- Major League Baseball postseason:
  - American League Championship Series Game 6 in Arlington, Texas: Texas Rangers 15, Detroit Tigers 5. **Rangers win series 4–2.**
    - The Rangers win the ALCS for the second successive year. Rangers outfielder Nelson Cruz is named series MVP with a postseason series record six home runs and 13 RBIs in six games.

==== Cricket ====
- West Indies in Bangladesh:
  - 2nd ODI in Dhaka: Bangladesh 220 (48.5 overs); West Indies 221/2 (42.4 overs). **West Indies win by 8 wickets; lead 3-match series 2–0.**
- New Zealand in Zimbabwe:
  - 1st T20I in Harare: Zimbabwe 123/8 (20 overs); New Zealand 127/0 (13.3 overs). **New Zealand win by 10 wickets; lead 2-match series 1–0.**

==== Cycling ====
- UCI World Tour:
  - Giro di Lombardia: (gold) Oliver Zaugg (SUI) (Leopard Trek) 6h 20' 02" (silver) Dan Martin (IRL) (Garmin–Cervélo) + 8" (bronze) Joaquim Rodríguez (ESP) (Team Katusha) + 8"
    - Final World Tour standings: (1) Philippe Gilbert (BEL) (Omega Pharma–Lotto) 718 points (2) Cadel Evans (AUS) (BMC Racing Team) 574 (3) Alberto Contador (ESP) (Saxo Bank–SunGard) 471

==== Fencing ====
- World Championships in Catania, Italy:
  - Men's team épée: (gold) France (silver) Hungary (bronze) Switzerland
  - Women's team sabre: (gold) Russia (silver) Ukraine (bronze) United States

==== Figure skating ====
- ISU Junior Grand Prix (skaters in **bold** qualify for Final):
  - JGP Tallinn Cup in Tallinn, Estonia:
    - Ladies: (gold) Gracie Gold (USA) 172.69 points (silver) **Risa Shoji** (JPN) 157.83 (bronze) Samantha Cesario (USA) 145.96
      - Final standings: **Yulia Lipnitskaya** (RUS) & **Polina Shelepen** (RUS) 30 points, **Vanessa Lam** (USA), Shoji & **Li Zijun** (CHN) 26, **Polina Korobeynikova** (RUS), Cesario & Polina Agafonova (RUS) 22.
    - Ice Dance: (gold) **Anna Yanovskaia**/**Sergey Mozgov** (RUS) 142.72 points (silver) Irina Shtork/Taavi Rand (EST) 126.51 (bronze) Evgenia Kosigina/Nikolai Moroshkin (RUS) 123.48
      - Final standings: **Victoria Sinitsina**/**Ruslan Zhiganshin** (RUS) & **Alexandra Stepanova**/**Ivan Bukin** (RUS) 30 points, Yanovskaia/Mozgov, **Maria Nosulia**/**Evgen Kholoniuk** (UKR) & **Anastasia Galyeta**/**Alexei Shumski** 26, **Alexandra Aldridge**/**Daniel Eaton** (USA), Lauri Bonacorsi/Travis Mager (USA), Valeria Zenkova/Valerie Sinitsin (RUS) & Kosigina/Moroshkin 24.

==== Football (soccer) ====
- CAF Champions League Semifinals second leg (first leg score in parentheses): **Espérance ST** (Tunisia) 2–0 (1–0) (Sudan) Al-Hilal. Espérance ST win 3–0 on aggregate.
- CAF Confederation Cup Semifinals first leg: Sunshine Stars (Nigeria) 0–1 (Tunisia) Club Africain

==== Gymnastics ====
- World Artistic Gymnastics Championships in Tokyo, Japan:
  - Men:
    - Floor: (gold) Kōhei Uchimura (JPN) 15.633 points (silver) Zou Kai (CHN) 15.500 (bronze) Diego Hypólito (BRA) & Alexander Shatilov (ISR) 14.466
      - Uchimura wins his second title of the championships and fourth title overall.
    - Pommel horse: (gold) Krisztián Berki (HUN) 15.833 points (silver) Cyril Tommasone (FRA) 15.266 (bronze) Louis Smith (GBR) 15.066
      - Berki wins the pommel horse title for the second successive time.
    - Rings: (gold) Chen Yibing (CHN) 15.800 points (silver) Arthur Nabarrete Zanetti (BRA) 15.600 (bronze) Koji Yamamuro (JPN) 15.500
      - Chen wins his second title of the championships, fourth rings title and eighth world title overall.
  - Women:
    - Vault: (gold) McKayla Maroney (USA) 15.300 points (silver) Oksana Chusovitina (GER) 14.733 (bronze) Phan Thị Hà Thanh (VIE) 14.666
      - Maroney wins her second title of the championships.
    - Uneven bars: (gold) Viktoria Komova (RUS) 15.500 points (silver) Tatiana Nabieva (RUS) 15.000 (bronze) Huang Qiushuang (CHN) 14.833

==== Multi-sport events ====
- Pan American Games, day 2 in Guadalajara, Mexico:
  - Cycling:
    - Men's cross-country: (gold) Hector Páez (COL) 1:31:12 (silver) Max Plaxton (CAN) 1:31:29 (bronze) Jeremiah Bishop (USA) 1:32:41
    - Women's cross-country: (gold) Heather Irmiger (USA) 1:34:09 (silver) Laura Morfin (MEX) 1:35:54 (bronze) Amanda Sin (CAN) 1:37:14
  - Gymnastics:
    - Women's rhythmic individual all-around: (gold) Julie Zetlin (USA) 100.850 points (silver) Cynthia Valdez (MEX) 100.325 (bronze) Angélica Kvieczynski (BRA) 98.200
  - Modern pentathlon:
    - Women's modern pentathlon: (gold) Margaux Isaksen (USA) 5356 points (silver) Yane Marques (BRA) 5260 (bronze) Tamara Vega (MEX) 4956
  - Swimming:
    - Women's 100 metre butterfly: (gold) Claire Donahue (USA) 58.73 (silver) Daynara de Paula (BRA) 59.30 (bronze) Elaine Breeden (USA) 59.81
    - Women's 400 metre individual medley: (gold) Julia Smit (USA) 4:46.15 (silver) Joanna Maranhão (BRA) 4:46.33 (bronze) Allysa Vavra (USA) 4:48.05
    - Women's 4 × 100 metre freestyle relay: (gold) United States (Madison Kennedy, Elizabeth Pelton, Amanda Kendall, Erika Erndl) 3:40.66 (silver) Brazil (Michelle Lenhardt, Tatiana Lemos, Flávia Delaroli, de Paula) 3:44.62 (bronze) Canada (Jen Beckberger, Caroline Lapierre, Ashley McGregor, Paige Schultz) 3:48.37
    - Men's 400 metre freestyle: (gold) Charles Houchin (USA) 3:50.95 (silver) Matthew Patton (USA) 3:51.25 (bronze) Cristian Quintero (VEN) 3:52.51
    - Men's 400 metre individual medley: (gold) Thiago Pereira (BRA) 4:16.68 (silver) Conor Dwyer (USA) 4:18.22 (bronze) Robert Margalis (USA) 4:24.88
  - Taekwondo:
    - Women's 49 kg: (gold) Ivett Gonda (CAN) (silver) Lizbeth Díez Canseco (PER) (bronze) Jannet Alegria (MEX) & Deireanne Morales (USA)
    - Men's 58 kg: (gold) Gabriel Mercedes (DOM) (silver) Damián Villa (MEX) (bronze) Frank Díaz (CUB) & Marcio Ferreira (BRA)

==== Rugby union ====
- World Cup in New Zealand:
  - Semifinals in Auckland: Wales 8–9 **France**
    - France advance to the final for the third time.

=== October 14, 2011 (Friday) ===
==== Auto racing ====
- Nationwide Series:
  - Dollar General 300 in Concord, North Carolina: (1) (Missouri) Carl Edwards (Ford; Roush Fenway Racing) (2) (Nevada) Kyle Busch (Toyota; Joe Gibbs Racing) (3) (Tennessee) Trevor Bayne (Ford; Roush Fenway Racing)
    - Drivers' championship standings (after 31 of 34 races): (1) (Mississippi) Ricky Stenhouse Jr. (Ford; Roush Fenway Racing) 1100 points (2) (Virginia) Elliott Sadler (Chevrolet; Kevin Harvick Incorporated) 1085 (3) (Florida) Aric Almirola (Chevrolet; JR Motorsports) 1013

==== Baseball ====
- World Cup in Panama (teams in **bold** advance to Final):
  - Group 3 (F/7 unless stated):
    - In Aguadulce:
      - South Korea 1–3 United States
      - Venezuela 4–7 United States
      - Venezuela 2–12 **Netherlands**
    - In Panama City:
      - Panama 4–5 (F/8) Australia
      - Canada 2–8 **Cuba**
      - **Cuba** 7–2 Panama
        - Final standings: Netherlands, Cuba 6–1, Canada, United States 4–3, Australia 3–4, South Korea, Panama 2–5, Venezuela 1–6.
- Major League Baseball postseason:
  - National League Championship Series Game 5 in St. Louis: St. Louis Cardinals 7, Milwaukee Brewers 1. Cardinals lead series 3–2.

==== Cricket ====
- England in India:
  - 1st ODI in Hyderabad: India 300/7 (50 overs); England 174 (36.1 overs). **India win by 126 runs; lead 5-match series 1–0.**

==== Fencing ====
- World Championships in Catania, Italy:
  - Women's team foil: (gold) Russia (Inna Deriglazova, Aida Shanayeva, Larisa Korobeynikova, Yevgeniya Lamonova) (silver) Italy (Arianna Errigo, Valentina Vezzali, Elisa Di Francisca, Ilaria Salvatori) (bronze) South Korea (Lee Hye-Sun, Nam Hyun-Hee, Jeon Hee-Sook, Jung Gil-Ok)
    - Shanayeva wins her second team title and third world title overall.
  - Men's team sabre: (gold) Russia (Nikolay Kovalev, Reshetnikov Veniamin, Aleksey Yakimenko, Pavel Bykov) (silver) Belarus (Valery Pryiemka, Aliaksandr Buikevich, Dmitri Lapkes, Aliaksei Likhacheuski) (bronze) Italy (Diego Occhuizzi, Aldo Montano, Gianpiero Pastore, Luigi Tarantino)

==== Figure skating ====
- ISU Junior Grand Prix (skaters in **bold** qualify for the Final):
  - JGP Tallinn Cup in Tallinn, Estonia:
    - Pairs: (gold) **Katherine Bobak**/**Ian Beharry** (CAN) 147.72 points (silver) **Britney Simpson**/**Matthew Blackmer** (USA) 141.28 (bronze) **Jessica Calalang**/**Zack Sidhu** (USA) 139.32
      - Final standings: **Sui Wenjing**/**Han Cong** (CHN) 30 points, Simpson/Blackmer & Bobak/Beharry 28, **Yu Xiaoyu**/**Jin Yang** (CHN) 26, **Ekaterina Petaikina**/**Maxim Kurduykov** (RUS) & Calalang/Sidhu 20.
    - Men: (gold) **Joshua Farris** (USA) 207.67 points (silver) **Maxim Kovtun** (RUS) 186.87 (bronze) Shoma Uno (JPN) 175.15
      - Final standings: **Yan Han** (CHN) & Farris 30 points, **Jason Brown** (USA), Kovtun & **Ryuju Hino** (JPN) 28, **Keiji Tanaka** (JPN) 24.

==== Gymnastics ====
- World Artistic Gymnastics Championships in Tokyo, Japan:
  - Men's all-around: (gold) Kōhei Uchimura (JPN) 93.631 points (silver) Philipp Boy (GER) 90.530 (bronze) Kōji Yamamuro (JPN) 90.255
    - Uchimura wins the all-around title for the third successive time.

==== Multi-sport events ====
- The opening ceremony of the Pan American Games is held in Guadalajara, Mexico.

==== Volleyball ====
- Men's Club World Championship in Doha, Qatar:
  - 3rd place: SESI (Brazil) 1–3 (bronze) (Russia) **Zenit**
  - Final: (silver) Jastrzębski (Poland) 1–3 (gold) (Italy) **Trentino**
    - Trentino win the title for a record third time.
- Women's Club World Championship in Doha, Qatar:
  - 3rd place: (bronze) **Sollys Osasco** (Brazil) 3–0 (Dominican Republic) Mirador
  - Final: (silver) VakıfBank TT (Turkey) 0–3 (gold) (Azerbaijan) **Rabita Baku**

=== October 13, 2011 (Thursday) ===
==== Baseball ====
- World Cup in Panama (team in **bold** advances to Final):
  - Group 3 (F/7 unless stated):
    - In Aguadulce:
      - Canada 7–0 Venezuela
      - Canada 4–0 South Korea
      - Panama 4–5 South Korea
    - In Santiago de Veraguas:
      - United States 2–1 Australia
      - Netherlands 2–1 (F/9) Australia
      - Cuba 1–4 **Netherlands**
        - Standings: Netherlands 5–1, Cuba 4–1, Canada 4–2, United States, Panama 2–3, South Korea, Australia 2–4, Venezuela 1–4.
- Major League Baseball postseason:
  - American League Championship Series Game 5 in Detroit: Detroit Tigers 7, Texas Rangers 5. Rangers lead series 3–2.
  - National League Championship Series Game 4 in St. Louis: Milwaukee Brewers 4, St. Louis Cardinals 2. Series tied 2–2.

==== Cricket ====
- West Indies in Bangladesh:
  - 1st ODI in Dhaka: West Indies 298/4 (50 overs; Lendl Simmons 122); Bangladesh 258/7 (50 overs). **West Indies win by 40 runs; lead 3-match series 1–0.**
- Australia in South Africa:
  - 1st T20I in Cape Town: South Africa 146/7 (20 overs); Australia 147/5 (19.3 overs). **Australia win by 5 wickets; lead 2-match series 1–0.**

==== Fencing ====
- World Championships in Catania, Italy (ITA unless stated):
  - Women's épée: (gold) Li Na (CHN) (silver) Sun Yujie (CHN) (bronze) Ana Maria Brânză (ROU) & Anca Măroiu (ROU)
    - Li wins her second world title.
  - Men's foil: (gold) Andrea Cassarà (silver) Valerio Aspromonte (bronze) Giorgio Avola & Victor Sintès (FRA)
    - Cassarà wins his third world title.

==== Gymnastics ====
- World Artistic Gymnastics Championships in Tokyo, Japan:
  - Women's all-around: (gold) Jordyn Wieber (USA) 59.382 points (silver) Viktoria Komova (RUS) 59.349 (bronze) Yao Jinnan (CHN) 58.598
    - Wieber wins her second title of the championships.

==== Snowboarding ====
- World Cup in Landgraaf, Netherlands:
  - Men's slalom: (gold) Roland Fischnaller (ITA) (silver) Aaron March (ITA) (bronze) Andreas Prommegger (AUT)
  - Women's slalom: (gold) Fränzi Mägert-Kohli (SUI) (silver) Yekaterina Tudegesheva (RUS) (bronze) Marion Kreiner (AUT)

==== Volleyball ====
- Men's Club World Championship in Doha, Qatar:
  - Semifinals:
    - **Jastrzębski** (Poland) 3–2 (Brazil) SESI
    - **Trentino** (Italy) 3–1 (Russia) Zenit
- Women's Club World Championship in Doha, Qatar:
  - Semifinals:
    - **VakıfBank TT** (Turkey) 3–0 (Brazil) Sollys Osasco
    - **Rabita Baku** (Azerbaijan) 3–0 (Dominican Republic) Mirador

=== October 12, 2011 (Wednesday) ===
==== Baseball ====
- World Cup in Panama:
  - Group 3:
    - In Chitré:
      - Venezuela – United States — match postponed due to rain
      - Canada – South Korea — match postponed due to rain
    - In Santiago de Veraguas:
      - Netherlands 1–1 Australia — match suspended in the top of the seventh inning due to rain
      - Cuba – Panama — match postponed due to rain
        - Standings: Cuba 4–0, Netherlands 3–1, Australia, Panama, Canada 2–2, Venezuela, South Korea, United States 1–3.
- Major League Baseball postseason:
  - American League Championship Series Game 4 in Detroit: Texas Rangers 7, Detroit Tigers 3 (F/11). Rangers lead series 3–1.
  - National League Championship Series Game 3 in St. Louis: St. Louis Cardinals 4, Milwaukee Brewers 3. Cardinals lead series 2–1.

==== Cricket ====
- ICC Intercontinental Cup One-Day:
  - 8th Match in Sharjah: United Arab Emirates 221/8 (50 overs); Afghanistan 152 (44.4 overs). **United Arab Emirates win by 69 runs.**
    - Standings (after 4 matches): Ireland, Scotland 8 points, United Arab Emirates 6, Netherlands, Afghanistan 4, Kenya 2, Namibia, Canada 0.

==== Fencing ====
- World Championships in Catania, Italy:
  - Men's épée: (gold) Paolo Pizzo (ITA) (silver) Bas Verwijlen (NED) (bronze) Fabian Kauter (SUI) & Park Kyoung-Doo (KOR)
  - Women's sabre: (gold) Sofiya Velikaya (RUS) (silver) Mariel Zagunis (USA) (bronze) Julia Gavrilova (RUS) & Olha Kharlan (UKR)
    - Velikaya wins her third world title.

==== Football (soccer) ====
- UEFA Women's Euro 2013 qualifying Group 4: Israel 1–6 Scotland
  - Standings (after 2 matches unless stated): France 6 points, Scotland 3 (1), Republic of Ireland 3, Wales 0 (1), Israel 0.
- Copa Sudamericana Round of 16 second leg (first leg score in parentheses): Independiente (Argentina) 1–0 (0–2) (Ecuador) **LDU Quito**. 3–3 on points; LDU Quito win 2–1 on aggregate.

==== Gymnastics ====
- World Artistic Gymnastics Championships in Tokyo, Japan:
  - Men's team: (gold) China (Zou Kai, Teng Haibin, Chen Yibing, Zhang Chenglong, Feng Zhe, Yan Mingyong) 275.161 points (silver) Japan (Kōhei Uchimura, Kazuhito Tanaka, Kenya Kobayashi, Koji Yamamuro, Makoto Okiguchi, Yūsuke Tanaka) 273.093 (bronze) United States (Jake Dalton, Jonathan Horton, Danell Leyva, Steven Legendre, Alex Naddour, John Orozco) 273.083
    - China win the men's team title for the fifth successive time.
    - Chen wins his fourth team title and seventh world title overall.
    - Zou and Teng both win their third team title and fourth world title overall.

==== Surfing ====
- Men's World Tour:
  - Quiksilver Pro France in France: (1) Gabriel Medina (BRA) (2) Julian Wilson (AUS) (3) Taylor Knox (USA) & Jordy Smith (RSA)
    - Standings (after 8 of 11 events): (1) Kelly Slater (USA) 50,150 points (2) Owen Wright (AUS) 43,900 (3) Joel Parkinson (AUS) 35,900

==== Volleyball ====
- Men's Club World Championship in Doha, Qatar (teams in **bold** qualify for semifinals):
  - Pool B: **Trentino** (Italy) 3–1 (Brazil) **SESI**
    - Final standings: Trentino 9 points, SESI 6, (Qatar) Al-Arabi 2, (Egypt) Al-Ahly 1.
- Women's Club World Championship in Doha, Qatar (teams in **bold** qualify for semifinals):
  - Pool A: Kenya Prisons 0–3 (Turkey) **VakıfBank TT**
    - Final standings: VakıfBank TT 6 points, (Dominican Republic) **Mirador** 2, Kenya Prisons 1.
  - Pool B: **Rabita Baku** (Azerbaijan) 3–2 (Brazil) **Sollys Osasco**
    - Final standings: Rabita Baku 5 points, Sollys Osasco 4, (Thailand) Chang 0.

=== October 11, 2011 (Tuesday) ===
==== Baseball ====
- World Cup in Panama:
  - Group 3:
    - In Chitré:
      - Netherlands 5–1 South Korea
      - Venezuela 4–11 Panama
    - In Santiago de Veraguas:
      - Canada 0–7 Australia
      - Cuba 8–7 United States
        - Standings: Cuba 4–0, Netherlands 3–1, Australia, Panama, Canada 2–2, Venezuela, South Korea, United States 1–3.
- Major League Baseball postseason:
  - American League Championship Series Game 3 in Detroit: Detroit Tigers 5, Texas Rangers 2. Rangers lead series 2–1.

==== Cricket ====
- West Indies in Bangladesh:
  - Only T20I in Dhaka: West Indies 132/8 (20 overs); Bangladesh 135/7 (19.5 overs). **Bangladesh win by 3 wickets.**

==== Fencing ====
- World Championships in Catania, Italy (ITA unless stated):
  - Women's foil: (gold) Valentina Vezzali (silver) Elisa Di Francisca (bronze) Lee Kiefer (USA) & Nam Hyun-Hee (KOR)
    - Vezzali wins her sixth individual world title and 13th overall.
  - Men's sabre: (gold) Aldo Montano (silver) Nicolas Limbach (GER) (bronze) Gu Bon-Gil (KOR) & Luigi Tarantino

==== Football (soccer) ====
- UEFA Euro 2012 qualifying, matchday 12 (teams in **bold** qualify for the Finals, teams in italics advance to the play-offs):
  - Group A:
    - **Germany** 3–1 Belgium
    - Kazakhstan 0–0 Austria
    - Turkey 1–0 Azerbaijan
      - Final standings: Germany 30 points, Turkey 17, Belgium 15, Austria 12, Azerbaijan 7, Kazakhstan 4.
  - Group B:
    - North Macedonia 1–1 Slovakia
    - Republic of Ireland 2–1 Armenia
    - **Russia** 6–0 Andorra
      - Final standings: Russia 23 points, Republic of Ireland 21, Armenia 17, Slovakia 15, Macedonia 8, Andorra 0.
  - Group C:
    - **Italy** 3–0 Northern Ireland
    - Slovenia 1–0 Serbia
      - Final standings: Italy 26 points, Estonia 16, Serbia 15, Slovenia 14, Northern Ireland 9, Faroe Islands 4.
  - Group D:
    - Albania 1–1 Romania
    - **France** 1–1 Bosnia and Herzegovina
      - Final standings: France 21 points, Bosnia and Herzegovina 20, Romania 14, Belarus 13, Albania 9, Luxembourg 4.
  - Group E:
    - Hungary 0–0 Finland
    - Moldova 4–0 San Marino
    - **Sweden** 3–2 **Netherlands**
      - Final standings: Netherlands 27 points, Sweden 24, Hungary 19, Finland 10, Moldova 9, San Marino 0.
  - Group F:
    - Croatia 2–0 Latvia
    - Georgia 1–2 **Greece**
    - Malta 0–2 Israel
      - Final standings: Greece 24 points, Croatia 22, Israel 16, Latvia 11, Georgia 10, Malta 1.
  - Group G:
    - Bulgaria 0–1 Wales
    - Switzerland 2–0 Montenegro
      - Final standings: **England** 18 points, Montenegro 12, Switzerland 11, Wales 9, Bulgaria 5.
  - Group H:
    - **Denmark** 2–1 Portugal
    - Norway 3–1 Cyprus
      - Final standings: Denmark 19 points, Portugal, Norway 16, Iceland 4, Cyprus 2.
  - Group I:
    - Lithuania 1–4 Czech Republic
    - **Spain** 3–1 Scotland
      - Final standings: Spain 24 points, Czech Republic 13, Scotland 11, Lithuania 5, Liechtenstein 4.
- 2014 FIFA World Cup qualification – CONMEBOL, matchday 2:
  - Bolivia 1–2 Colombia
  - Chile 4–2 Peru
  - Paraguay 1–1 Uruguay
  - Venezuela 1–0 Argentina
    - Standings (after 2 matches unless stated): Uruguay 4 points, Argentina 3, Ecuador, Colombia 3 (1), Peru, Chile, Venezuela 3, Paraguay 1, Bolivia 0.
- 2014 FIFA World Cup qualification – AFC third round, matchday 3:
  - Group A:
    - Singapore 0–3 Jordan
    - China 0–1 Iraq
      - Standings (after 3 matches): Jordan 9 points, Iraq 6, China PR 3, Singapore 0.
  - Group B:
    - South Korea 2–1 United Arab Emirates
    - Lebanon 2–2 Kuwait
      - Standings (after 3 matches): South Korea 7 points, Kuwait 5, Lebanon 4, United Arab Emirates 0.
  - Group C:
    - North Korea 0–1 Uzbekistan
    - Japan 8–0 Tajikistan
      - Standings (after 3 matches): Japan, Uzbekistan 7 points, North Korea 3, Tajikistan 0.
  - Group D:
    - Australia 3–0 Oman
    - Thailand 0–0 Saudi Arabia
      - Standings (after 3 matches): Australia 9 points, Thailand 4, Saudi Arabia 2, Oman 1.
  - Group E:
    - Indonesia 2–3 Qatar
    - Iran 6–0 Bahrain
      - Standings (after 3 matches): Iran 7 points, Qatar 5, Bahrain 4, Indonesia 0.
- 2014 FIFA World Cup qualification – CONCACAF second round, matchday 4 (teams in **bold** advance to the Third round):
  - Group A:
    - Suriname 1–3 Dominican Republic
    - El Salvador 4–0 Cayman Islands
      - Standings (after 4 matches): El Salvador 12 points, Suriname 7, Dominican Republic 4, Cayman Islands 0.
  - Group B:
    - Trinidad and Tobago 4–0 Barbados
    - Bermuda 1–1 Guyana
      - Standings (after 4 matches): Guyana 10 points, Trinidad and Tobago 9, Bermuda 4, Barbados 0.
  - Group C: **Panama** 5–1 Nicaragua
    - Standings (after 3 matches unless stated): Panama 9 points, Nicaragua 3, Dominica 0 (2).
  - Group D:
    - Canada 0–0 Puerto Rico
    - Saint Kitts and Nevis 1–1 Saint Lucia
      - Standings (after 4 matches): Canada 10 points, Saint Kitts and Nevis 6, Puerto Rico 3, Saint Lucia 1.
  - Group E: Guatemala 3–1 Belize
    - Standings (after 4 matches unless stated): Guatemala 12 points, Grenada 3 (3), Belize 3, Saint Vincent and the Grenadines 3 (3).
  - Group F:
    - Haiti 2–2 Curaçao
    - Antigua and Barbuda 10–0 U.S. Virgin Islands
      - Standings (after 4 matches): Antigua and Barbuda 12 points, Haiti 10, Curaçao 1, U.S. Virgin Islands 0.
- Friendly international (top 10 in FIFA World Rankings): Mexico 1–2 (7) Brazil
- Egypt Cup Final: Zamalek 1–2 **ENPPI**
  - ENPPI wins the Cup for the second time.

==== Gymnastics ====
- World Artistic Gymnastics Championships in Tokyo, Japan:
  - Women's team: (gold) United States (Jordyn Wieber, Aly Raisman, McKayla Maroney, Gabby Douglas, Sabrina Vega, Alicia Sacramone) 179.411 points (silver) Russia (Ksenia Afanasyeva, Viktoria Komova, Tatiana Nabieva, Anna Dementyeva, Yulia Belokobylskaya, Yulia Inshina) 175.329 (bronze) China (Yao Jinnan, Tan Sixin, Sui Lu, Huang Qiushuang, Jiang Yuyuan, He Kexin) 172.820
    - The United States win the women's team title for the third time.
    - Sacramone, who was retained on the USA roster despite getting injured in training just before the championships, wins her second team title and fourth title overall, and her tenth medal makes her the most decorated American gymnast in World Championships history.

==== Volleyball ====
- Men's Club World Championship in Doha, Qatar (teams in **bold** qualify for semifinals):
  - Pool A: **Jastrzębski** (Poland) 3–0 (Canada) Spartans
    - Final standings: Jastrzębski 8 points, (Russia) **Zenit** 7, Spartans 2, (Iran) Paykan 1.
  - Pool B: **Trentino** (Italy) 3–0 (Qatar) Al-Arabi
    - Standings: Trentino, (Brazil) **SESI** 6 points (2 matches), Al-Arabi 2 (3), (Egypt) Al-Ahly 1 (3).
- Women's Club World Championship in Doha, Qatar (teams in **bold** qualify for semifinals):
  - Pool B: **Rabita Baku** (Azerbaijan) 3–1 (Thailand) Chang
    - Standings: Rabita Baku, (Brazil) **Sollys Osasco** 3 points (1 match), Chang 0 (2).

=== October 10, 2011 (Monday) ===
==== Australian rules football ====
- AFL Trade Week in Melbourne begins, the only opportunity for clubs to trade players before the 2012 AFL season commences.

==== Baseball ====
- World Cup in Panama (teams in **bold** qualify for second round):
  - Group 1:
    - In Panama City: **Panama** 0–5 **United States**
    - In Aguadulce: Greece 0–15 (F/6) Chinese Taipei
      - Final standings: **Canada**, **Netherlands** 6–1, Panama 5–2, United States 4–3, Puerto Rico 3–4, Japan, Chinese Taipei 2–5, Greece 0–7.
- Major League Baseball postseason:
  - American League Championship Series Game 2 in Arlington, Texas: Texas Rangers 7, Detroit Tigers 3 (F/11). Rangers lead series 2–0.
  - National League Championship Series Game 2 in Milwaukee: St. Louis Cardinals 12, Milwaukee Brewers 3. Series tied 1–1.

==== Cricket ====
- ICC Intercontinental Cup One-Day:
  - 7th Match in Sharjah: United Arab Emirates 198 (44.3 overs); Afghanistan 183 (48.3 overs). **United Arab Emirates win by 15 runs.**
    - Standings (after 4 matches unless stated): Ireland, Scotland 8 points, Afghanistan, United Arab Emirates 4 (3), Netherlands 4, Kenya 2, Namibia, Canada 0.

==== Volleyball ====
- Men's Club World Championship in Doha, Qatar (teams in **bold** qualify for semifinals):
  - Pool A:
    - Spartans (Canada) 3–2 (Iran) Paykan
    - Jastrzębski (Poland) 3–2 (Russia) **Zenit**
      - Standings: Zenit 7 points (3 matches), Jastrzębski 5 (2), Spartans 2 (2), Paykan 1 (3).
  - Pool B: Al-Ahly (Egypt) 1–3 (Brazil) **SESI**
    - Standings: SESI 6 points (2 matches), (Italy) Trentino 3 (1), (Qatar) Al-Arabi 2 (2), Al-Ahly 1 (3).
- Women's Club World Championship in Doha, Qatar:
  - Pool A: Kenya Prisons 2–3 (Dominican Republic) Mirador
    - Standings: (Turkey) VakıfBank TT 3 points (1 match), Mirador 2 (2), Kenya Prisons 1 (1).

=== October 9, 2011 (Sunday) ===
==== Athletics ====
- World Marathon Majors:
  - Chicago Marathon (KEN unless stated):
    - Men: (gold) Moses Mosop 2:05:37 (silver) Wesley Korir 2:06:15 (bronze) Bernard Kipyego 2:06:29
      - Standings (after 10 of 11 events): (1) Patrick Makau Musyoki 60 points (2) Emmanuel Kipchirchir Mutai 55 (3) Tsegaye Kebede (ETH) 41
    - Women: (gold) Liliya Shobukhova (RUS) 2:18:20 (silver) Ejegayehu Dibaba (ETH) 2:22:09 (bronze) Kayoko Fukushi (JPN) 2:24:38
      - Standings (after 10 of 11 events): (1) Shobukhova 90 points (2) Edna Kiplagat 60 (3) Mary Jepkosgei Keitany 35
        - Shobukhova wins her second consecutive title.

==== Auto racing ====
- Formula One:
  - Japanese Grand Prix in Suzuka, Japan: (1) Jenson Button (GBR) (McLaren–Mercedes) (2) Fernando Alonso (ITA) (Ferrari) (3) Sebastian Vettel (GER) (Red Bull–Renault)
    - Drivers' championship standings (after 15 of 19 races): (1) Vettel 324 points (2) Button 210 (3) Alonso 202
      - Vettel becomes the ninth driver to win consecutive world titles, and the youngest driver to win two titles.
- Sprint Cup Series – Chase for the Sprint Cup:
  - Hollywood Casino 400 in Kansas City, Kansas: (1) (California) Jimmie Johnson (Chevrolet; Hendrick Motorsports) (2) (Washington (state)) Kasey Kahne (Toyota; Red Bull Racing Team) (3) (Michigan) Brad Keselowski (Dodge; Penske Racing)
    - Drivers' championship standings (after 30 of 36 races): (1) (Missouri) Carl Edwards (Ford; Roush Fenway Racing) 2161 points (2) (California) Kevin Harvick (Chevrolet; Richard Childress Racing) 2160 (3) Johnson 2157
- V8 Supercars:
  - Supercheap Auto Bathurst 1000 in Bathurst, New South Wales (AUS unless stated): (1) Garth Tander/Nick Percat (Holden Racing Team; Holden VE Commodore) (2) Craig Lowndes/Mark Skaife (Triple Eight Race Engineering; Holden VE Commodore) (3) Greg Murphy (NZL)/Allan Simonsen (DEN) (Kelly Racing; Holden VE Commodore)
    - Drivers' championship standings (after 20 of 28 races): (1) Lowndes 2329 points (2) Jamie Whincup (Triple Eight Race Engineering; Holden VE Commodore) 2229 (3) Shane van Gisbergen (NZL) (Stone Brothers Racing; Ford FG Falcon) 1920

==== Baseball ====
- World Cup in Panama (teams in **bold** qualify for second round):
  - Group 1:
    - In Panama City:
      - United States 1–6 **Canada**
      - **Panama** 3–7 **Netherlands**
    - In Aguadulce:
      - Greece 4–9 Japan
      - Chinese Taipei 3–1 Puerto Rico
        - Standings: Canada, Netherlands 6–1, Panama 5–1, United States 3–3, Puerto Rico 3–4, Japan 2–5, Chinese Taipei 1–5, Greece 0–6.
  - Group 2:
    - In Chitre:
      - **Australia** 9–6 Germany
      - Dominican Republic 4–5 (F/10) **South Korea**
    - In Santiago de Veraguas:
      - **Venezuela** 7–6 (F/10) Italy
      - Nicaragua 0–6 **Cuba**
        - Final standings: Cuba 7–0, Venezuela, South Korea 5–2, Australia 4–3, Dominican Republic, Italy 3–4, Nicaragua 1–6, Germany 0–7.
- Major League Baseball postseason:
  - American League Championship Series Game 2 in Arlington, Texas: Texas Rangers vs. Detroit Tigers — postponed to October 10 due to inclement weather.
  - National League Championship Series Game 1 in Milwaukee: Milwaukee Brewers 9, St. Louis Cardinals 6. Brewers lead series 1–0.

==== Cricket ====
- Champions League Twenty20 Final in Chennai: Mumbai Indians 139 (20 overs); Royal Challengers Bangalore 108 (19.2 overs). **Mumbai Indians win by 31 runs.**

==== Cycling ====
- UCI World Tour:
  - Tour of Beijing, Stage 5: (gold) Denis Galimzyanov (RUS) (Team Katusha) 2h 19' 44" (silver) Juan José Haedo (ARG) (Saxo Bank–SunGard) s.t. (bronze) Elia Viviani (ITA) (Liquigas–Cannondale) s.t.
    - Final general classification: (1) Tony Martin (GER) (HTC–Highroad) 13h 39' 11" (2) David Millar (GBR) (Garmin–Cervélo) + 17" (3) Chris Froome (GBR) (Team Sky) + 26"
    - World Tour standings (after 25 of 26 races): (1) Philippe Gilbert (BEL) (Omega Pharma–Lotto) 698 points (2) Cadel Evans (AUS) (BMC Racing Team) 574 (3) Alberto Contador (ESP) (Saxo Bank–SunGard) 471

==== Field hockey ====
- Oceania Cup in Hobart, Australia:
  - Men's Game 3: Australia 6–1 New Zealand. **Series tied 1–1; Australia win on goal difference.**
    - Australia win the Cup for the seventh successive time.
    - Both teams qualify for the 2012 Olympics.
  - Women's Game 3: Australia 2–4 New Zealand. **Series tied 1–1; New Zealand win on goal difference.**
    - New Zealand win the Cup for the third successive time.
    - Both teams qualify for the 2012 Olympics.

==== Football (soccer) ====
- 2012 Africa Cup of Nations qualification, matchday 6 (teams in **bold** qualify for the Finals):
  - Group D:
    - **Morocco** 3–1 Tanzania
    - Algeria 2–0 Central African Republic
      - Final standings: Morocco 11 points, Central African Republic, Algeria 8, Tanzania 5.
  - Group E: Mauritius 0–2 **Senegal**
    - Final standings: Senegal 16 points, Cameroon 11, DR Congo 7, Mauritius 0.
  - Group H:
    - Benin 0–1 Rwanda
    - **Ivory Coast** 2–1 Burundi
      - Final standings: Côte d'Ivoire 18 points, Rwanda 6, Burundi, Benin 5.

==== Golf ====
- PGA Tour – Fall Series:
  - Frys.com Open in San Martin, California:
    - Winner: Bryce Molder (USA) 267 (−17)^{PO}
      - Molder defeats Briny Baird (USA) on the sixth playoff hole, to win his first PGA Tour title.
- European Tour:
  - Madrid Masters in Madrid, Spain:
    - Winner: Lee Slattery (ENG) 273 (−15)
      - Slattery wins his first European Tour title.
- LPGA Tour:
  - LPGA Hana Bank Championship in Incheon, South Korea:
    - Winner: Yani Tseng (TWN) 202 (−14)
      - Tseng wins her sixth title of the year, and eleventh of her career.
- Champions Tour:
  - Insperity Championship in The Woodlands, Texas:
    - Winner: Brad Faxon (USA) 134 (−10)
      - Faxon wins his first Champions Tour title.

==== Rugby union ====
- World Cup knockout stage in New Zealand:
  - Quarter-finals:
    - In Wellington: South Africa 9–11 **Australia**
    - In Auckland: **New Zealand** 33–10 Argentina

==== Snooker ====
- Players Tour Championship – Event 7: Kay Suzanne Memorial Trophy in Gloucester, England:
  - Final: **Ronnie O'Sullivan** (ENG) 4–2 Matthew Stevens (WAL)
    - O'Sullivan wins his 47th professional title.
    - Order of Merit (after 7 of 12 events): (1) O'Sullivan 24,400 (2) Neil Robertson (AUS) 15,600 (3) Judd Trump (ENG) 13,900

==== Tennis ====
- ATP World Tour:
  - China Open in Beijing, China:
    - Final: **Tomáš Berdych** (CZE) def. Marin Čilić (CRO) 3–6, 6–4, 6–1
      - Berdych wins his sixth ATP Tour title.
  - Rakuten Japan Open Tennis Championships in Tokyo, Japan:
    - Final: **Andy Murray** (GBR) def. Rafael Nadal (ESP) 3–6, 6–2, 6–0
      - Murray wins his fourth title of the year, and 20th of his career.
- WTA Tour:
  - China Open in Beijing, China:
    - Final: **Agnieszka Radwańska** (POL) def. Andrea Petkovic (GER) 7–5, 0–6, 6–4
      - Radwańska wins her third title of the year, and seventh of her career.

==== Volleyball ====
- Men's Club World Championship in Doha, Qatar:
  - Pool A: Paykan (Iran) 0–3 (Russia) Zenit
    - Standings: Zenit 6 points (2 matches), (Poland) Jastrzębski 3 (1), (Canada) Spartans 0 (1), Paykan 0 (2).
  - Pool B:
    - Trentino (Italy) 3–0 (Egypt) Al-Ahly
    - SESI (Brazil) 3–0 (Qatar) Al-Arabi
      - Standings: Trentino, SESI 3 points (1 match), Al-Arabi 2 (2), Al-Ahly 1 (2).
- Women's Club World Championship in Doha, Qatar:
  - Pool B: Sollys Osasco (Brazil) 3–1 (Thailand) Chang

=== October 8, 2011 (Saturday) ===
==== Auto racing ====
- Nationwide Series:
  - Kansas Lottery 300 in Kansas City, Kansas: (1) (Michigan) Brad Keselowski (Dodge; Penske Racing) (2) (Missouri) Carl Edwards (Ford; Roush Fenway Racing) (3) (Virginia) Elliott Sadler (Chevrolet; Kevin Harvick Incorporated)
    - Drivers' championship standings (after 30 of 34 races): (1) (Mississippi) Ricky Stenhouse Jr. (Ford; Roush Fenway Racing) 1064 points (2) Sadler 1044 (3) (Georgia (U.S. state)) Reed Sorenson (Dodge; MacDonald Motorsports) 994

==== Baseball ====
- World Cup in Panama (teams in **bold** qualify for second round):
  - Group 1:
    - In Panama City:
      - **Netherlands** 4–5 (F/11) **Canada**
      - **Panama** – United States — match postponed due to rain
    - In Aguadulce:
      - Greece – Chinese Taipei — match postponed due to rain
      - Puerto Rico 6–0 Japan
        - Standings: Panama 5–0, Canada, Netherlands 5–1, United States 3–2, Puerto Rico 3–3, Japan 1–5, Chinese Taipei, Greece 0–5.
  - Group 2:
    - In Chitre:
      - Australia 15–0 (F/5) Venezuela
      - South Korea 4–0 Italy
    - In Santiago de Veraguas:
      - **Cuba** 8–2 Germany
      - Dominican Republic 16–1 (F/6) Nicaragua
        - Standings: Cuba 6–0, Venezuela, South Korea 4–2, Dominican Republic, Italy, Australia 3–3, Nicaragua 1–5, Germany 0–6.
- Major League Baseball postseason:
  - American League Championship Series Game 1 in Arlington, Texas: Texas Rangers 3, Detroit Tigers 2. Rangers lead series 1–0.

==== Boxing ====
- World Championships in Baku, Azerbaijan:
  - Light flyweight: (gold) Zou Shiming (CHN) (silver) Shin Jong-Hun (KOR) (bronze) Pürevdorjiin Serdamba (MGL) & David Ayrapetyan (RUS)
  - Flyweight: (gold) Misha Aloyan (RUS) (silver) Andrew Selby (WAL) (bronze) Jasurbek Latipov (UZB) & Rau'shee Warren (USA)
  - Bantamweight: (gold) Lázaro Álvarez (CUB) (silver) Luke Campbell (ENG) (bronze) John Joe Nevin (IRL) & Anvar Yunusov (TJK)
  - Lightweight: (gold) Vasyl Lomachenko (UKR) (silver) Yasniel Toledo (CUB) (bronze) Gani Zhailauov (KAZ) & Domenico Valentino (ITA)
  - Light welterweight: (gold) Éverton Lopes (BRA) (silver) Denys Berinchyk (UKR) (bronze) Vincenzo Mangiacapre (ITA) & Tom Stalker (ENG)
  - Welterweight: (gold) Taras Shelestyuk (UKR) (silver) Serik Sapiyev (KAZ) (bronze) Egidijus Kavaliauskas (LTU) & Vikas Krishan Yadav (IND)
  - Middleweight: (gold) Evhen Khytrov (UKR) (silver) Ryota Murata (JPN) (bronze) Esquiva Florentino (BRA) & Bogdan Juratoni (ROM)
  - Light heavyweight: (gold) Julio César la Cruz (CUB) (silver) Adilbek Niyazymbetov (KAZ) (bronze) Egor Mekhontsev (RUS) & Elshod Rasulov (UZB)
  - Heavyweight: (gold) Oleksandr Usyk (UKR) (silver) Teymur Mammadov (AZE) (bronze) Siarhei Karneyeu (BLR) & Wang Xuanxuan (CHN)
  - Super heavyweight: (gold) Magomedrasul Majidov (AZE) (silver) Anthony Joshua (ENG) (bronze) Erik Pfeifer (GER) & Ivan Dychko (KAZ)

==== Cricket ====
- ICC Intercontinental Cup, day 4 in Sharjah: United Arab Emirates 462 & 228 (73 overs); Afghanistan 328 & 131/7 (80 overs). **Match drawn.**
  - Standings (after 2 matches): Ireland 40 points, United Arab Emirates, Afghanistan 23, Netherlands 17, Scotland, Kenya 16, Namibia 3, Canada 0.
- Champions League Twenty20 Semifinals in Chennai: Mumbai Indians 160/5 (20 overs); Somerset 150/7 (20 overs). **Mumbai Indians win by 10 runs.**

==== Cycling ====
- UCI World Tour:
  - Tour of Beijing, Stage 4: (gold) Elia Viviani (ITA) (Liquigas–Cannondale) 4h 09' 08" (silver) Peter Sagan (SVK) (Liquigas–Cannondale) s.t. (bronze) Juan José Haedo (ARG) (Saxo Bank–SunGard) s.t.
    - General classification (after stage 4): (1) Tony Martin (GER) (HTC–Highroad) 11h 19' 27" (2) David Millar (GBR) (Garmin–Cervélo) + 17" (3) Chris Froome (GBR) (Team Sky) + 26"

==== Field hockey ====
- Oceania Cup in Hobart, Australia:
  - Men's Game 2: Australia 3–3 New Zealand. New Zealand lead series 1–0.
  - Women's Game 2: Australia 3–3 New Zealand. Australia lead series 1–0.

==== Figure skating ====
- ISU Junior Grand Prix:
  - JGP Trofeo Walter Lombardi in Milan, Italy (RUS unless stated):
    - Ice Dance: (gold) Alexandra Stepanova/Ivan Bukin 149.98 points (silver) Valeria Zenkova/Valerie Sinitsin 130.58 (bronze) Lauri Bonacorsi/Travis Mager (USA) 129.63
      - Standings (after 6 of 7 events): Victoria Sinitsina/Ruslan Zhiganshin & Stepanova/Bukin 30 points (2 events), Maria Nosulia/Evgen Kholoniuk (UKR) & Anastasia Galyeta/Alexei Shumski (UKR) 26 (2), Alexandra Aldridge/Daniel Eaton (USA), Bonacorsi/Mager & Zenkova/Sinitsin 24 (2), Nicole Orford/Thomas Williams (CAN) 20 (2), Shari Koch/Christian Nüchtern (GER) 18 (2)
    - Ladies: (gold) Yulia Lipnitskaya 183.05 points (silver) Anna Shershak 150.21 (bronze) Hannah Miller (USA) 146.74
      - Standings (after 6 of 7 events): Lipnitskaia & Polina Shelepen 30 points (2 events), Vanessa Lam (USA) & Li Zijun (CHN) 26 (2), Polina Korobeynikova & Polina Agafonova 22 (2), Satoko Miyahara (JPN) 20 (2), Kim Hae-jin (KOR) & Miu Sato (JPN) 18 (2)

==== Football (soccer) ====
- UEFA Euro 2012 qualifying, matchday 11 (team in **bold** qualifies for the Finals):
  - Group I: Liechtenstein 0–1 Scotland
    - Standings (after 7 matches unless stated): **Spain** 21 points, Scotland 11, Czech Republic 10, Lithuania 5, Liechtenstein 4 (8).
- 2012 Africa Cup of Nations qualification, matchday 6 (teams in **bold** qualify for the Finals):
  - Group A:
    - Liberia 2–2 **Mali**
    - Cape Verde 2–1 Zimbabwe
      - Final standings: Mali, Cape Verde 10 points, Zimbabwe 8, Liberia 5.
  - Group B:
    - Ethiopia 4–2 Madagascar
    - Nigeria 2–2 **Guinea**
      - Final standings: Guinea 14 points, Nigeria 11, Ethiopia 7, Madagascar 1.
  - Group C:
    - **Zambia** 0–0 **Libya**
    - Mozambique 3–0 Comoros
      - Final standings: Zambia 13 points, Libya 12, Mozambique 7, Comoros 1.
  - Group F: Gambia 1–1 **Burkina Faso**
    - Final standings: Burkina Faso 10 points, Gambia 4, Namibia 3.
  - Group G:
    - Egypt 3–0 **Niger**
    - South Africa 0–0 Sierra Leone
      - Final standings: Niger, South Africa, Sierra Leone 9 points, Egypt 5.
  - Group I:
    - Swaziland 0–0 Congo
    - Sudan 0–2 **Ghana**
      - Final standings: Ghana 16 points, Sudan 13, Congo 4, Swaziland 1.
  - Group J:
    - Uganda 0–0 Kenya
    - Guinea-Bissau 0–2 **Angola**
      - Final standings: Angola 12 points, Uganda 11, Kenya 8, Guinea-Bissau 3.
  - Group K:
    - Chad 2–2 Malawi
    - **Tunisia** 2–0 Togo
      - Final standings: **Botswana** 17 points, Tunisia 14, Malawi 12, Togo 6, Chad 3.

==== Mixed martial arts ====
- UFC 136 in Houston, Texas, United States (USA unless stated):
  - Lightweight Championship bout: **Frankie Edgar** (c) def. Gray Maynard via TKO (punches)
  - Featherweight Championship bout: **José Aldo** (BRA) (c) def. Kenny Florian via unanimous decision (49–46, 49–46, 49–46)
  - Middleweight bout: **Chael Sonnen** def. Brian Stann via submission (arm triangle choke)
  - Featherweight bout: **Nam Phan** def. Leonard Garcia via unanimous decision (29–28, 29–28, 29–28)
  - Lightweight bout: **Joe Lauzon** def. Melvin Guillard via submission (rear naked choke)

==== Rugby league ====
- Super League Play-offs:
  - Grand Final in Manchester: **Leeds Rhinos** 32–16 St. Helens
    - Leeds win the Grand Final for a record fifth time.

==== Rugby union ====
- World Cup knockout stage in New Zealand:
  - Quarter-finals:
    - In Wellington: Ireland 10–22 **Wales**
    - In Auckland: England 12–19 **France**

==== Volleyball ====
- Men's Club World Championship in Doha, Qatar:
  - Pool A:
    - Spartans (Canada) 0–3 (Russia) Zenit
    - Jastrzębski (Poland) 3–0 (Iran) Paykan
  - Pool B: Al-Ahly (Egypt) 2–3 (Qatar) Al-Arabi
- Women's Club World Championship in Doha, Qatar:
  - Pool A: VakıfBank TT (Turkey) 3–0 (Dominican Republic) Mirador

=== October 7, 2011 (Friday) ===
==== Baseball ====
- World Cup in Panama (teams in **bold** qualify for second round):
  - Group 1:
    - In Panama City:
      - Japan 3–1 Chinese Taipei
      - Canada 3–12 **Panama**
    - In Aguadulce:
      - Puerto Rico 10–1 Greece
      - United States 5–7 **Netherlands**
        - Standings: Netherlands, Panama 5–0, Canada 4–1, United States 3–2, Puerto Rico 2–3, Japan 1–4, Chinese Taipei, Greece 0–5.
  - Group 2:
    - In Chitre:
      - Germany 5–10 Venezuela
      - Italy 1–5 **Cuba**
    - In Santiago de Veraguas:
      - Dominican Republic 9–11 (F/11) Australia
      - South Korea 6–4 Nicaragua
        - Standings: Cuba 5–0, Venezuela 4–1, South Korea, Italy 3–2, Dominican Republic, Australia 2–3, Nicaragua 1–4, Germany 0–5.
- Major League Baseball postseason:
  - National League Division Series:
    - Game 5 in Philadelphia: St. Louis Cardinals 1, Philadelphia Phillies 0. **Cardinals win series 3–2.**
    - Game 5 in Milwaukee: Milwaukee Brewers 3, Arizona Diamondbacks 2 (F/10). **Brewers win series 3–2.**

==== Basketball ====
- WNBA Playoffs:
  - WNBA Finals Game 3 in Atlanta: Minnesota Lynx 73, Atlanta Dream 67. **Lynx win series 3–0.**
    - The Lynx win their first WNBA title.

==== Cricket ====
- ICC Intercontinental Cup, day 3 in Sharjah: United Arab Emirates 462 & 212/5 (55 overs); Afghanistan 328 (112.4 overs; Mohammad Nabi 117, Arshad Ali 6/45). United Arab Emirates lead by 346 runs with 5 wickets remaining.
- Champions League Twenty20 Semifinals in Bangalore: New South Wales Blues 203/2 (20 overs; David Warner 123*); Royal Challengers Bangalore 204/4 (18.3 overs). **Royal Challengers Bangalore win by 6 wickets.**

==== Cycling ====
- UCI World Tour:
  - Tour of Beijing, Stage 3: (gold) Nicolas Roche (IRL) (Ag2r–La Mondiale) 3h 53' 15" (silver) Philip Deignan (IRL) (Team RadioShack) s.t. (bronze) Chris Froome (GBR) (Team Sky) + 1"
    - General classification (after stage 3): (1) Tony Martin (GER) (HTC–Highroad) 7h 10' 19" (2) David Millar (GBR) (Garmin–Cervélo) + 17" (3) Froome + 26"

==== Figure skating ====
- ISU Junior Grand Prix:
  - JGP Trofeo Walter Lombardi in Milan, Italy:
    - Men: (gold) Yan Han (CHN) 219.37 points (silver) Jason Brown (USA) 194.28 (bronze) Lee June-hyoung (KOR) 176.48
      - Standings (after 6 of 7 events): Yan 30 points (2 events), Brown, Ryuju Hino (JPN) 28 (2), Keiji Tanaka (JPN) 24 (2), Artur Dmitriev Jr. (RUS) 22 (2), Zhang He, Lee & Timothy Dolensky (USA) 20 (2).

==== Football (soccer) ====
- UEFA Euro 2012 qualifying, matchday 11 (teams in **bold** qualify for the Finals, teams in italics qualify for the play-offs):
  - Group A:
    - Azerbaijan 1–4 Austria
    - Turkey 1–3 **Germany**
    - Belgium 4–1 Kazakhstan
      - Standings (after 9 matches): Germany 27 points, Belgium 15, Turkey 14, Austria 11, Azerbaijan 7, Kazakhstan 3.
  - Group B:
    - Armenia 4–1 North Macedonia
    - Slovakia 0–1 Russia
    - Andorra 0–2 Republic of Ireland
      - Standings (after 9 matches): Russia 20 points, Republic of Ireland 18, Armenia 17, Slovakia 14, Macedonia 7, Andorra 0.
  - Group C:
    - Serbia 1–1 **Italy**
    - Northern Ireland 1–2 Estonia
      - Standings (after 9 matches unless stated): Italy 23 points, Estonia 16 (10), Serbia 15, Slovenia 11, Northern Ireland 9, Faroe Islands 4 (10).
  - Group D:
    - Bosnia and Herzegovina 5–0 Luxembourg
    - Romania 2–2 Belarus
    - France 3–0 Albania
      - Standings (after 9 matches unless stated): France 20 points, Bosnia and Herzegovina 19, Romania 13, Belarus 13 (10), Albania 8, Luxembourg 4 (10).
  - Group E:
    - Finland 1–2 Sweden
    - **Netherlands** 1–0 Moldova
      - Standings (after 9 matches): Netherlands 27 points, Sweden 21, Hungary 18, Finland 9, Moldova 6, San Marino 0.
  - Group F:
    - Latvia 2–0 Malta
    - Greece 2–0 Croatia
      - Standings (after 9 matches): Greece 21 points, Croatia 19, Israel 13, Latvia 11, Georgia 10, Malta 1.
  - Group G:
    - Wales 2–0 Switzerland
    - Montenegro 2–2 **England**
      - Standings (after 7 matches unless stated): England 18 points (8 matches), Montenegro 12, Switzerland 8, Wales 6, Bulgaria 5.
  - Group H:
    - Cyprus 1–4 Denmark
    - Portugal 5–3 Iceland
      - Standings (after 7 matches unless stated): Portugal, Denmark 16 points, Norway 13, Iceland 4 (8), Cyprus 2.
  - Group I: Czech Republic 0–2 **Spain**
    - Standings (after 7 matches unless stated): Spain 21 points, Czech Republic 10, Scotland 8 (6), Lithuania 5, Liechtenstein 4.
- 2014 FIFA World Cup qualification – CONCACAF second round, matchday 3:
  - Group A:
    - Dominican Republic 1–2 El Salvador
    - Cayman Islands 0–1 Suriname
      - Standings (after 3 matches): El Salvador 9 points, Suriname 7, Dominican Republic 1, Cayman Islands 0.
  - Group B:
    - Barbados 0–2 Guyana
    - Bermuda 2–1 Trinidad and Tobago
      - Standings (after 3 matches): Guyana 9 points, Trinidad and Tobago 6, Bermuda 3, Barbados 0.
  - Group C: Dominica 0–5 Panama
    - Standings (after 2 matches): Panama 6 points, Nicaragua 3, Dominica 0.
  - Group D:
    - Saint Lucia 0–7 Canada
    - Puerto Rico 1–1 Saint Kitts and Nevis
      - Standings (after 3 matches): Canada 9 points, Saint Kitts and Nevis 5, Puerto Rico 2, Saint Lucia 0.
  - Group E:
    - Saint Vincent and the Grenadines 0–3 Guatemala
    - Belize 1–4 Grenada
      - Standings (after 3 matches): Guatemala 9 points, Grenada, Belize, Saint Vincent and the Grenadines 3.
  - Group F:
    - U.S. Virgin Islands 0–7 Haiti
    - Curaçao 0–1 Antigua and Barbuda
      - Standings (after 3 matches): Haiti, Antigua and Barbuda 9 points, Curaçao, U.S. Virgin Islands 0.
- 2014 FIFA World Cup qualification – CONMEBOL, matchday 1:
  - Uruguay 4–2 Bolivia
  - Ecuador 2–0 Venezuela
  - Argentina 4–1 Chile
  - Peru 2–0 Paraguay
- 2012 Africa Cup of Nations qualification, matchday 6 (team in **bold** qualifies for the Finals):
  - Group E: DR Congo 2–3 Cameroon
    - Standings: **Senegal** 13 points (5 matches), Cameroon 11 (6), Congo DR 7 (6), Mauritius 0 (5).
- Friendly internationals (top 10 in FIFA World Rankings):
  - Costa Rica 0–1 (7) Brazil

=== October 6, 2011 (Thursday) ===
==== Baseball ====
- World Cup in Panama (teams in **bold** qualify for second round):
  - Group 1:
    - In Panama City:
      - **Netherlands** 5–0 Puerto Rico
      - Japan 2–6 **Panama**
    - In Aguadulce:
      - United States 3–0 Greece
      - Canada 4–0 Chinese Taipei
        - Standings: Netherlands, Canada, Panama 4–0, United States 3–1, Puerto Rico 1–3, Japan, Chinese Taipei, Greece 0–4.
  - Group 2:
    - In Chitre:
      - Nicaragua 3–4 Australia
      - Italy 7–2 Germany
    - In Santiago de Veraguas:
      - Venezuela 6–3 Dominican Republic
      - Cuba 4–1 South Korea
        - Standings: Cuba 4–0, Italy, Venezuela 3–1, Dominican Republic, South Korea 2–2, Nicaragua, Australia 1–3, Germany 0–4.
- Major League Baseball postseason:
  - American League Division Series Game 5 in New York: Detroit Tigers 3, New York Yankees 2. **Tigers win series 3–2.**

==== Cricket ====
- ICC Intercontinental Cup, day 2 in Sharjah: United Arab Emirates 462 (117.1 overs); Afghanistan 242/3 (74 overs; Mohammad Nabi 108*). Afghanistan trail by 220 runs with 7 wickets remaining in the 1st innings.

==== Cycling ====
- UCI World Tour:
  - Tour of Beijing, Stage 2: (gold) Heinrich Haussler (AUS) (Garmin–Cervélo) 3h 03' 30" (silver) Denis Galimzyanov (RUS) (Team Katusha) s.t. (bronze) Theo Bos (NED) (Rabobank) s.t.
    - General classification (after stage 2): (1) Tony Martin (GER) (HTC–Highroad) 3h 17' 03" (2) David Millar (GBR) (Garmin–Cervélo) + 17" (3) Alex Dowsett (GBR) (Team Sky) + 24"

==== Field hockey ====
- Oceania Cup in Hobart, Australia:
  - Men's Game 1: Australia 0–3 New Zealand. New Zealand lead series 1–0.
  - Women's Game 1: Australia 2–1 New Zealand. Australia lead series 1–0.

==== Football (soccer) ====
- UEFA Women's Champions League Round of 32, second leg (first leg scores in parentheses):
  - **Rossiyanka** (Russia) 1–0 (2–0) (Netherlands) Twente. Rossiyanka win 3–0 on aggregate.
  - Valur (Iceland) 0–3 (1–1) (Scotland) **Glasgow City**. Glasgow City win 4–1 on aggregate.
  - **Brøndby** (Denmark) 3–4 (2–0) (Belgium) Standard Liège. Brøndby win 5–4 on aggregate.
  - **Rayo Vallecano** (Spain) 3–0 (4–1) (Finland) PK-35. Rayo Vallecano win 7–1 on aggregate.
  - **LdB Malmö** (Sweden) 5–0 (1–2) (Italy) Tavagnacco. LdB Malmö win 6–2 on aggregate.
  - **Göteborg** (Sweden) 7–0 (4–0) (Croatia) Osijek. Göteborg win 11–0 on aggregate.

=== October 5, 2011 (Wednesday) ===
==== Baseball ====
- World Cup in Panama:
  - Group 1 in Panama City: Japan 3–7 United States
    - Standings: Netherlands, Canada, Panama 3–0, United States 2–1, Puerto Rico 1–2, Japan, Chinese Taipei, Greece 0–3.
- Major League Baseball postseason:
  - National League Division Series:
    - Game 4 in St. Louis: St. Louis Cardinals 5, Philadelphia Phillies 3. Series tied 2–2.
    - Game 4 in Phoenix, Arizona: Arizona Diamondbacks 10, Milwaukee Brewers 6. Series tied 2–2.

==== Basketball ====
- WNBA Playoffs:
  - WNBA Finals Game 2 in Minneapolis: Minnesota Lynx 101, Atlanta Dream 95. Lynx lead series 2–0.

==== Cricket ====
- ICC Intercontinental Cup, day 1 in Sharjah: United Arab Emirates 361/8 (96 overs); Afghanistan.

==== Cycling ====
- UCI World Tour:
  - Tour of Beijing, Stage 1: (gold) Tony Martin (GER) (HTC–Highroad) 13' 33" (silver) David Millar (GBR) (Garmin–Cervélo) + 17" (bronze) Alex Dowsett (GBR) (Team Sky) + 24"

==== Football (soccer) ====
- UEFA Women's Champions League Round of 32, second leg (first leg scores in parentheses):
  - **Torres** (Italy) 3–2 (2–0) (Israel) ASA Tel Aviv. Torres win 5–2 on aggregate.
  - **Frankfurt** (Germany) 4–1 (0–1) (Norway) Stabæk. Frankfurt win 4–2 on aggregate.
  - **Sparta Prague** (Czech Republic) 2–1 (2–2) (Cyprus) Apollon Limassol. Sparta Prague win 4–3 on aggregate.
  - **Paris Saint-Germain** (France) 3–0 (2–0) (Republic of Ireland) Peamount United. Paris Saint-Germain win 5–0 on aggregate.
  - **Energiya Voronezh** (Russia) 4–2 (1–1) (England) Bristol Academy. Energiya Voronezh win 5–3 on aggregate.
  - **Arsenal** (England) 6–0 (4–0) (Belarus) Bobruichanka. Arsenal win 10–0 on aggregate.
  - **Lyon** (France) 3–0 (9–0) (Romania) Olimpia Cluj. Lyon win 12–0 on aggregate.
  - **Fortuna Hjørring** (Denmark) 2–1 (3–0) (Switzerland) YB Frauen. Fortuna Hjørring win 5–1 on aggregate.
  - **Turbine Potsdam** (Germany) 8–2 (6–0) (Iceland) Þór/KA. Turbine Potsdam win 14–2 on aggregate.
  - **Neulengbach** (Austria) 5–0 (1–2) (Kazakhstan) SShVSM-Kairat Almaty. Neulengbach win 6–2 on aggregate.
- Copa Sudamericana Round of 16 first leg:
  - Universidad Católica (Chile) 0–2 (Argentina) Vélez Sarsfield
  - Aurora (Bolivia) 3–1 (Brazil) Vasco da Gama

=== October 4, 2011 (Tuesday) ===
==== Baseball ====
- World Cup in Panama:
  - Group 1:
    - In Panama City:
      - Japan 2–5 Netherlands
      - Panama 4–2 Puerto Rico
    - In Aguadulce:
      - Greece 2–12 Canada
      - Chinese Taipei 1–15 (F/7) United States
        - Standings: Netherlands, Canada, Panama 3–0, United States 1–1, Puerto Rico 1–2, Japan 0–2, Chinese Taipei, Greece 0–3.
  - Group 2:
    - In Chitre:
      - Italy 6–3 Nicaragua
      - South Korea 8–0 Australia
    - In Santiago de Veraguas:
      - Germany 2–13 (F/7) Dominican Republic
      - Cuba 14–2 (F/7) Venezuela
        - Standings: Cuba 3–0, Dominican Republic, South Korea, Italy, Venezuela 2–1, Nicaragua 1–2, Germany, Australia 0–3.
- Major League Baseball postseason:
  - American League Division Series:
    - Game 4 in Detroit: New York Yankees 10, Detroit Tigers 1. Series tied 2–2.
    - Game 4 in St. Petersburg, Florida: Texas Rangers 4, Tampa Bay Rays 3. **Rangers win series 3–1.**
      - Rangers third baseman Adrián Beltré becomes only the seventh player to hit three home runs in a playoff game.
  - National League Division Series:
    - Game 3 in St. Louis: Philadelphia Phillies 3, St. Louis Cardinals 2. Phillies lead series 2–1.
    - Game 3 in Phoenix, Arizona: Arizona Diamondbacks 8, Milwaukee Brewers 1. Brewers lead series 2–1.

==== Football (soccer) ====
- AFC Cup Semi-finals first leg:
  - Nasaf Qarshi (Uzbekistan) 1–0 (Jordan) Al-Wehdat
  - Arbil (Iraq) 0–2 Al-Kuwait
- (United States) Lamar Hunt U.S. Open Cup Final in Seattle: **Seattle Sounders FC** 2–0 Chicago Fire
  - Seattle win the Cup for the third successive year and become the first U.S. team to qualify for the 2012–13 CONCACAF Champions League.

=== October 3, 2011 (Monday) ===
==== Baseball ====
- World Cup in Panama:
  - Group 1:
    - In Panama City:
      - Japan 1–3 Canada
      - Puerto Rico 8–4 (F/10) United States
    - In Aguadulce:
      - Netherlands 19–0 (F/5) Greece
      - Chinese Taipei 8–14 Panama
        - Standings: Netherlands, Panama, Canada 2–0, Puerto Rico 1–1, Japan, United States 0–1, Chinese Taipei, Greece 0–2.
  - Group 2:
    - In Chitre:
      - Australia 0–7 Italy
      - Germany 5–6 (F/10) South Korea
    - In Santiago de Veraguas:
      - Cuba 3–0 Dominican Republic
      - Nicaragua 2–5 Venezuela
        - Standings: Cuba, Venezuela 2–0, Dominican Republic, South Korea, Italy, Nicaragua 1–1, Germany, Australia 0–2.
- Major League Baseball postseason:
  - American League Division Series:
    - Game 3 in St. Petersburg, Florida: Texas Rangers 4, Tampa Bay Rays 3. Rangers lead series 2–1.
    - Game 3 in Detroit: Detroit Tigers 5, New York Yankees 4. Tigers lead series 2–1.

=== October 2, 2011 (Sunday) ===
==== Auto racing ====
- Sprint Cup Series – Chase for the Sprint Cup:
  - AAA 400 in Dover, Delaware: (1) (Nevada) Kurt Busch (Dodge; Penske Racing) (2) (California) Jimmie Johnson (Chevrolet; Hendrick Motorsports) (3) (Missouri) Carl Edwards (Ford; Roush Fenway Racing)
    - Drivers' championship standings (after 29 of 36 races): (1) (California) Kevin Harvick (Chevrolet; Richard Childress Racing) 2122 points (4 wins) (2) Edwards 2122 (1 win) (3) (Indiana) Tony Stewart (Chevrolet; Stewart Haas Racing) 2113
- IndyCar Series:
  - Kentucky Indy 300 in Sparta, Kentucky: (1) Ed Carpenter (USA) (Sarah Fisher Racing) (2) Dario Franchitti (GBR) (Chip Ganassi Racing) (3) Scott Dixon (NZL) (Chip Ganassi Racing)
    - Drivers' championship standings (after 17 of 18 races): (1) Franchitti 573 points (2) Will Power (AUS) (Team Penske) 555 (3) Dixon 518
- World Rally Championship:
  - Rallye de France in Strasbourg, France: (1) Sébastien Ogier (FRA)/Julien Ingrassia (FRA) (Citroën DS3 WRC) (2) Dani Sordo (ESP)/Carlos Del Barrio (ESP) (Mini John Cooper Works WRC) (3) Mikko Hirvonen (FIN)/Jarmo Lehtinen (FIN) (Ford Fiesta RS WRC)
    - Drivers' championship standings (after 11 of 13 rallies): (1) Sébastien Loeb (FRA) (Citroën DS3 WRC) & Hirvonen 196 points (3) Ogier 193

==== Baseball ====
- World Cup in Panama:
  - Group 1:
    - In Panama City:
      - Puerto Rico 1–9 Canada
      - Japan – United States — match postponed due to rain
    - In Aguadulce: Netherlands 2–1 Chinese Taipei
  - Group 2:
    - In Chitre:
      - Australia 0–14 (F/7) Cuba
      - Venezuela 5–4 South Korea
    - In Santiago de Veraguas:
      - Germany 4–5 Nicaragua
      - Dominican Republic 7–0 Italy
- Major League Baseball postseason:
  - American League Division Series:
    - Game 2 in New York: Detroit Tigers 5, New York Yankees 3. Series tied 1–1.
  - National League Division Series:
    - Game 2 in Philadelphia: St. Louis Cardinals 5, Philadelphia Phillies 4. Series tied 1–1.
    - Game 2 in Milwaukee: Milwaukee Brewers 9, Arizona Diamondbacks 4. Brewers lead series 2–0.

==== Basketball ====
- WNBA Playoffs:
  - WNBA Finals Game 1 in Minneapolis: Minnesota Lynx 88, Atlanta Dream 74. Lynx lead series 1–0.
- FIBA Africa Championship for Women in Bamako, Mali:
  - Bronze medal game: (bronze) **Mali** 71–62 Nigeria
  - Final: (gold) **Angola** 62–54 (silver) Senegal
    - Angola win the title for the first time, and qualify for the Olympics.
    - Mali and Senegal qualify for the World Olympic Qualifying Tournament.
- UAAP in San Juan, Philippines:
  - Women's Finals: Far Eastern University 68, Adamson University 57. **FEU win best-of-3 series 2–1.**
    - FEU win their 20th UAAP women's championship.

==== Football (soccer) ====
- CAF Champions League Semifinals first leg: Al-Hilal (Sudan) 0–1 (Tunisia) Espérance ST
- (Finland) Veikkausliiga, matchday 28 (team in **bold** qualify for Champions League): Mariehamn 0–2 **HJK**
  - Standings: HJK 70 points (28 matches), Inter Turku 49 (27), JJK 47 (28).
    - HJK win the title for the third successive time, and 24th time overall.

==== Golf ====
- PGA Tour Fall Series:
  - Justin Timberlake Shriners Hospitals for Children Open in Las Vegas, Nevada:
    - Winner: Kevin Na (USA) 261 (−23)
      - Na wins his first PGA Tour title.
- European Tour:
  - Alfred Dunhill Links Championship in Angus and Fife, Scotland:
    - Winner: Michael Hoey (NIR) 266 (−22)
      - Hoey wins his third European Tour title.
- Champions Tour:
  - SAS Championship in Cary, North Carolina:
    - Winner: Kenny Perry (USA) 205 (−11)
      - Perry wins his first Champions Tour title.

==== Horse racing ====
- Prix de l'Arc de Triomphe in Paris: (gold) Danedream (trainer: Peter Schiergen, jockey: Andrasch Starke) (silver) Shareta (trainer: Alain de Royer-Dupré, jockey: Thierry Jarnet) (bronze) Snow Fairy (trainer: Ed Dunlop, jockey: Frankie Dettori)

==== Motorcycle racing ====
- Moto GP:
  - Japanese Grand Prix in Motegi, Japan (ESP unless stated):
    - MotoGP: (1) Dani Pedrosa (Honda) (2) Jorge Lorenzo (Yamaha) (3) Casey Stoner (AUS) (Honda)
      - Riders' championship standings (after 15 of 18 rounds): (1) Stoner 300 points (2) Lorenzo 260 (3) Andrea Dovizioso (ITA) (Honda) 196
    - Moto2 (all Suter): (1) Andrea Iannone (ITA) (2) Marc Márquez (3) Thomas Lüthi (SUI)
      - Riders' championship standings (after 14 of 17 rounds): (1) Márquez 235 points (2) Stefan Bradl (GER) (Kalex) 234 (3) Iannone 157
    - 125cc: (1) Johann Zarco (FRA) (Derbi) (2) Nicolás Terol (Aprilia) (3) Héctor Faubel (Aprilia)
      - Riders' championship standings (after 14 of 17 rounds): (1) Terol 261 points (2) Zarco 230 (3) Maverick Viñales (Aprilia) 190
- Superbike:
  - Magny-Cours World Championship round in Magny-Cours, France:
    - Race 1: (1) Carlos Checa (ESP) (Ducati 1098R) (2) Marco Melandri (ITA) (Yamaha YZF-R1) (3) Leon Haslam (GBR) (BMW S1000RR)
    - Race 2: (1) Checa (2) Melandri (3) Eugene Laverty (IRL) (Yamaha YZF-R1)
      - Riders' championship standings (after 12 of 13 rounds): (1) Checa 467 points (2) Melandri 360 (3) Laverty 283
- Supersport:
  - Magny-Cours World Championship round in Magny-Cours, France: (1) Luca Scassa (ITA) (Yamaha YZF-R6) (2) Sam Lowes (GBR) (Honda CBR600RR) (3) Broc Parkes (AUS) (Kawasaki Ninja ZX-6R)
    - Riders' championship standings (after 11 of 12 rounds): (1) Chaz Davies (GBR) (Yamaha YZF-R6) 181 points (2) Fabien Foret (FRA) (Honda CBR600RR) 144 (3) Parkes & David Salom (ESP) (Kawasaki Ninja ZX-6R) 136

==== Rugby league ====
- NRL Grand Final in Sydney: **Manly-Warringah Sea Eagles** 24–10 New Zealand Warriors
  - Manly-Warringah win the title for the eighth time.

==== Rugby union ====
- World Cup in New Zealand (teams in **bold** advance to the quarterfinals, teams in italics qualify for 2015 World Cup):
  - Pool A in Wellington: **New Zealand** 79–15 Canada
    - Final standings: New Zealand 20 points, **France** 11, Tonga 9, Canada 6, Japan 2.
  - Pool B in Palmerston North: **Argentina** 25–7 Georgia
    - Final standings: **England** 18 points, Argentina 14, Scotland 11, Georgia 4, Romania 0.
  - Pool C in Dunedin: **Ireland** 36–6 Italy
    - Final standings: Ireland 17 points, **Australia** 15, Italy 10, United States 4, Russia 1.
  - Pool D in Hamilton: **Wales** 66–0 Fiji
    - Final standings: **South Africa** 18 points, Wales 15, Samoa 10, Fiji 5, Namibia 0.

==== Snooker ====
- Players Tour Championship – Event 6: Warsaw Classic in Warsaw, Poland:
  - Final: Ricky Walden (ENG) 1–4 **Neil Robertson** (AUS)
    - Robertson wins his eighth professional title.
    - Order of Merit (after 6 of 12 events): (1) Robertson 15,600 (2) Ronnie O'Sullivan (ENG) 14,400 (3) Judd Trump (ENG) 13,300

==== Tennis ====
- ATP World Tour:
  - PTT Thailand Open in Bangkok, Thailand:
    - Final: **Andy Murray** (GBR) def. Donald Young (USA) 6–2, 6–0
      - Murray wins his third title of the year, and 19th of his career.
  - Proton Malaysian Open in Kuala Lumpur, Malaysia:
    - Final: **Janko Tipsarević** (SRB) def. Marcos Baghdatis (CYP) 6–4, 7–5
      - Tipsarević wins his first ATP Tour title.

==== Volleyball ====
- Women's European Championship in Belgrade, Serbia:
  - Bronze medal match: Italy 2–3 (bronze) **Turkey**
  - Final: (silver) Germany 2–3 (gold) **Serbia**
    - Serbia win the title for the first time, and completes a rare "double" with the men's team also winning the European title last month.
    - Serbia and Germany already qualified for the World Cup.
- Women's South American Championship in Callao, Peru:
  - Bronze medal match: Colombia 1–3 (bronze) **Peru**
  - Final: (gold) **Brazil** 3–0 (silver) Argentina
    - Brazil win the title for the 17th time and qualify for the World Cup.

=== October 1, 2011 (Saturday) ===
==== Australian rules football ====
- AFL Grand Final in Melbourne: Collingwood 12.9 (81)–18.11 (119) **Geelong**
  - Geelong win the title for the ninth time.

==== Auto racing ====
- Nationwide Series:
  - OneMain Financial 200 in Dover, Delaware: (1) (Missouri) Carl Edwards (Ford; Roush Fenway Racing) (2) (Michigan) Brad Keselowski (Dodge; Penske Racing) (3) (Kansas) Clint Bowyer (Chevrolet; Kevin Harvick Incorporated)
    - Drivers' championship standings (after 29 of 34 races): (1) (Mississippi) Ricky Stenhouse Jr. (Ford; Roush Fenway Racing) 1025 points (2) (Virginia) Elliott Sadler (Chevrolet; Kevin Harvick Incorporated) 1003 (3) (Georgia (U.S. state)) Reed Sorenson (Chevrolet; Turner Motorsports) 976

==== Baseball ====
- World Cup in Panama:
  - Group 1 in Panama City: Greece 3–8 Panama
- Major League Baseball postseason:
  - American League Division Series:
    - Game 2 in Arlington, Texas: Texas Rangers 8, Tampa Bay Rays 6. Series tied 1–1.
    - Game 1 in New York: New York Yankees 9, Detroit Tigers 3. Yankees lead series 1–0.
  - National League Division Series:
    - Game 1 in Philadelphia: Philadelphia Phillies 11, St. Louis Cardinals 6. Phillies lead series 1–0.
    - Game 1 in Milwaukee: Milwaukee Brewers 4, Arizona Diamondbacks 1. Brewers lead series 1–0.
- Nippon Professional Baseball news: The Fukuoka SoftBank Hawks clinch their second consecutive Pacific League title with a 3–0 win over the Saitama Seibu Lions, and earn a one-win and home field advantage for Climax Series Final Stage.

==== Basketball ====
- FIBA Africa Championship for Women in Bamako, Mali:
  - Semifinals:
    - Mali 51–56 **Angola**
    - **Senegal** 89–63 Nigeria
- FIBA Americas Championship for Women in Neiva, Colombia:
  - Third place game: (bronze) **Canada** 59–46 Cuba
  - Final: (silver) Argentina 33–74 (gold) **Brazil**
    - Brazil win the title for the fifth time, and qualify for the 2012 Olympics.
    - Argentina, Canada and Cuba qualify for World Olympic Qualifying Tournament.
- UAAP in Quezon City, Philippines:
  - Men's Finals: Ateneo de Manila University 82, Far Eastern University 69. **Ateneo win best-of-3 series 2–0.**
    - Ateneo win their fourth consecutive, seventh UAAP and 21st men's championship.

==== Figure skating ====
- ISU Junior Grand Prix:
  - JGP Cup of Austria in Innsbruck, Austria:
    - Men: (gold) Yan Han (CHN) 205.86 points (silver) Gordei Gorshkov (RUS) 180.25 (bronze) Keiji Tanaka (JPN) 173.98
      - Standings (after 5 of 7 events): Ryuju Hino (JPN) 28 points (2 events), Tanaka 24 (2), Zhang He (CHN) & Timothy Dolensky (USA) 20 (2), Yan, Joshua Farris (USA), Jason Brown (USA) & Maxim Kovtun (RUS) 15 (1).
    - Ice Dance: (gold) Victoria Sinitsina/Ruslan Zhiganshin (RUS) 151.10 points (silver) Alexandra Aldridge/Daniel Eaton (USA) 136.85 (bronze) Maria Nosulia/Evgen Kholoniuk (UKR) 128.34
      - Standings (after 5 of 7 events): Sinitsina/Zhiganshin 30 points (2 events), Nosulia/Kholoniuk & Anastasia Galyeta/Alexei Shumski (UKR) 26 (2), Aldridge/Eaton 24 (2), Nicole Orford/Thomas Williams (CAN) 20 (2).

==== Football (soccer) ====
- CAF Champions League Semifinals first leg: Wydad Casablanca (Morocco) 1–0 (Nigeria) Enyimba

==== Mixed martial arts ====
- UFC Live: Cruz vs. Johnson in Washington, D.C., United States (USA unless stated):
  - Bantamweight Championship bout: **Dominick Cruz** (c) def. Demetrious Johnson via unanimous decision (50–45, 49–46, 50–45)
  - Heavyweight bout: **Stefan Struve** (NED) def. Pat Barry via submission (triangle choke)
  - Welterweight bout: **Anthony Johnson** def. Charlie Brenneman via TKO (head kick)
  - Lightweight bout: **Matt Wiman** def. Mac Danzig via unanimous decision (29–28, 29–28, 29–28)

==== Rugby league ====
- Super League Play-offs:
  - Semi-finals: **St. Helens** 26–18 Wigan Warriors

==== Rugby union ====
- World Cup in New Zealand (teams in **bold** advance to the quarterfinals, teams in italics qualify for 2015 World Cup):
  - Pool A in Wellington: **France** 14–19 Tonga
    - Standings (after 4 matches unless stated): **New Zealand** 15 points (3 matches), France 11, Tonga 9, Canada 6 (3), Japan 2.
  - Pool B in Auckland: **England** 16–12 Scotland
    - Standings (after 4 matches unless stated): England 18 points, Scotland 11, Argentina 10 (3), Georgia 4 (3), Romania 0.
  - Pool C in Nelson: **Australia** 68–22 Russia
    - Standings (after 4 matches unless stated): Australia 15 points, Ireland 13 (3), Italy 10 (3), United States 4, Russia 1.

==== Tennis ====
- WTA Tour:
  - Toray Pan Pacific Open in Tokyo, Japan:
    - Final: **Agnieszka Radwańska** (POL) def. Vera Zvonareva (RUS) 6–3, 6–2
      - Radwańska wins her sixth WTA Tour title.

==== Volleyball ====
- Women's European Championship in Belgrade, Serbia:
  - Semifinals:
    - **Germany** 3–0 Italy
    - **Serbia** 3–2 Turkey
      - Germany and Serbia qualify for the FIVB World Cup.
- Women's South American Championship in Callao, Peru:
  - Semifinals:
    - Peru 0–3 **Argentina**
    - **Brazil** 3–0 Colombia
      - Brazil qualify for the FIVB World Cup.
