= Shooting at the 2011 Pan American Games – Women's trap =

Shooting – Women's trap at the 2011 Pan American Games
- Venue: Jalisco Hunting Club
- Dates: October 18
- Competitors: 11 from 6 nations

Medalists
Gold medal	Miranda Wilder	United States
Silver medal	Lindsay Boddez	Canada
Bronze medal	Kayla Browning	United States

The women's trap shooting event at the 2011 Pan American Games was on October 18 at the Jalisco Hunting Club in Guadalajara. The defending Pan American Games champion is Susan Nattrass of Canada.

The event consisted of two rounds: a qualifier and a final. In the qualifier, each shooter fired 3 sets of 25 targets in trap shooting, with 10 targets being thrown to the left, 10 to the right, and 5 straight-away in each set. The shooters could take two shots at each target.

The top 6 shooters in the qualifying round moved on to the final round. There, they fired one additional round of 25 targets, where only one shot could be taken at each target. The total score from all 100 targets was used to determine final ranking. Ties are broken using a shoot-off; additional shots are fired one at a time until there is no longer a tie.

== Schedule ==
All times are Central Standard Time (UTC-6).

Date	Time	Round
October 18, 2011	9:00	Qualification
October 18, 2011	14:00	Final

== Records ==
The existing world and Pan American Games records were as follows.

Qualification records
World record	Victoria Chuyko (UKR); Chen Li (CHN); Zuzana Štefečeková (SVK); Giulia Iannotti (ITA); Satu Mäkelä-Nummela (FIN)	74	Nicosia, Cyprus; Qingyuan, China; Qingyuan, China; Maribor, Slovenia; Maribor, Slovenia	June 13, 1998; April 4, 2006; April 4, 2006; June 28, 2007; August 11, 2009
Pan American record	Collyn Whitly (USA)	67	Rio de Janeiro, Brazil	August 4, 2007

Final records
World record	Zuzana Štefečeková (SVK)	96 (74+22)	Qingyuan, China	April 4, 2006
Pan American record	Susan Nattrass (CAN)	80	Rio de Janeiro, Brazil	July 17, 2007

== Results ==
11 athletes from 6 countries competed.

=== Qualification ===
Rank	Athlete	Country	1	2	3	Shoot-off	Total	Notes
1	Kayle Browning	United States	21	24	23		68	Q PR
2	Miranda Wilder	United States	20	23	23		66	Q
3	Laura Gabriela Robles	Mexico	19	24	22		65	Q
4	Lindsay Boddez	Canada	24	21	20		65	Q
5	Karla De Bona	Brazil	22	21	22		65	Q
6	Vivian Rodriguez	Puerto Rico	19	18	24	+2	61	Q
7	Susan Nattrass	Canada	24	21	16	+1	61	
8	Pamela Salman	Chile	20	21	19		60	
9	Janice Teixeira	Brazil	17	20	21		58	
10	Dolores Pachuca	Mexico	18	19	16		53	
11	Nicole Andrea Morgando	Chile	16	17	16		49	

=== Final ===
Rank	Athlete	Qual	Final	Total	Notes
1st place, gold medalist(s)	Miranda Wilder (USA)	66	21	87	FPR
2nd place, silver medalist(s)	Lindsay Boddez (CAN)	65	21	86	
3rd place, bronze medalist(s)	Kayla Browning (USA)	69	17	85	
4	Laura Gabriela Robles (MEX)	65	19	84	
5	Karla De Bona (BRA)	65	18	83	
6	Vivian Rodriguez (PUR)	61	15	76	
