= Canada at the 2011 Pan American Games =

- IOC code: CAN
- NOC: Canadian Olympic Committee

in Guadalajara 14–30 October 2011
- Competitors: 492 in 35 sports
- Flag bearers: Christine Sinclair (Opening); Mary Spencer (Closing)
- Medals Ranked 5th: Gold 30 Silver 40 Bronze 49 Total 119

Pan American Games appearances (overview)
- 1955; 1959; 1963; 1967; 1971; 1975; 1979; 1983; 1987; 1991; 1995; 1999; 2003; 2007; 2011; 2015; 2019; 2023

Canada, which is represented by the Canadian Olympic Committee (COC), has competed at the 2011 Pan American Games in Guadalajara, Mexico from October 14 to 30, 2011. The Canadian team was made up of 492 athletes (256 men and 236 women), the most ever for a non-home Games. On the team all ten provinces and the Northwest Territories are represented. Some sports such as wrestling have sent their strongest team, however sports which offer the most medals (badminton and athletics) have sent for the most part a developmental team. Table Tennis player Anqi Luo (15 years old) was Canada's youngest athlete at the Games while Equestrian athlete Ian Millar (64 years old) was Canada's eldest athlete competing in Guadalajara. Canada has competed in 35 out of the 36 sports on the program (the exception being basque pelota). On October 4, 2011, women's football star Christine Sinclair was selected to carry the flag during the opening ceremony. The chef de mission was Jacques Cardyn and the assistant chef de mission was Curt Harnett.

Canada was the host of the next games in 2015 in Toronto.

== Medallists ==
| Medal | Name | Sport | Event | Date |
|---|---|---|---|---|
| Gold | Ivett Gonda | Taekwondo | Women's 49 kg | October 15 |
| Gold | Dorothy Ludwig | Shooting | Women's 10 metre air pistol | October 16 |
| Gold | Melissa Pagnotta | Taekwondo | Women's 67 kg | October 17 |
| Gold | Rosannagh MacLennan | Gymnastics | Women's trampoline | October 18 |
| Gold | Keegan Soehn | Gymnastics | Men's trampoline | October 18 |
| Gold | Laura Brown; Jasmin Glaesser; Stephanie Roorda | Cycling | Women's team pursuit | October 18 |
| Gold | Alex Bruce and Michelle Li | Badminton | Women's doubles | October 19 |
| Gold | Michelle Li | Badminton | Women's singles | October 20 |
| Gold | Grace Gao and Toby Ng | Badminton | Mixed doubles | October 20 |
| Gold | Mo Zhang | Table tennis | Women's singles | October 20 |
| Gold | Marie-Pier Boudreau and Élise Marcotte | Synchronized swimming | Women's duet | October 20 |
| Gold | Ashley McGregor | Swimming | Women's 200 m breaststroke | October 20 |
| Gold | Samantha Cornett; Stephanie Edmison; Miranda Ranieri | Squash | Women's team | October 21 |
| Gold | Stéphanie Durocher; Jo-Annie Fortin; Chloé Isaac; Stéphanie Leclair; Tracy Little; Élise Marcotte; Karine Thomas; Valerie Welsh | Synchronized swimming | Women's team | October 21 |
| Gold | Richard Weinberger | Swimming | Men's marathon 10 kilometres | October 22 |
| Gold | Carol Huynh | Wrestling | Women's Freestyle 48 kg | October 22 |
| Gold | Whitney McClintock | Water skiing | Women's tricks | October 23 |
| Gold | Jessica Phoenix | Equestrian | Individual eventing | October 23 |
| Gold | Christine Girard | Weightlifting | Women's 63 kg | October 25 |
| Gold | Dylan Armstrong | Athletics | Men's shot put | October 25 |
| Gold | Canada national baseball team | Baseball | Men's tournament | October 25 |
| Gold | Kathleen Fraser; Kristin Gauthier; Alexa Irvin; Una Lounder | Canoeing | Women's K-4 500 metres | October 26 |
| Gold | Philippe Beaudry | Fencing | Men's sabre | October 26 |
| Gold | Canadian women's national soccer team: Rachelle Beanlands; Melanie Booth; Candace Chapman; Robyn Gayle; Christina Julien; Kaylyn Kyle; Karina LeBlanc; Vanessa Legault-Cordisco; Diana Matheson; Kelly Parker; Sophie Schmidt; Desiree Scott; Lauren Sesselmann; Diamond Simpson; Christine Sinclair; Brittany Timko; Rhian Wilkinson; Shannon Woeller | Football | Women's tournament | October 27 |
| Gold | Richard Dessureault-Dober; Steven Jorens | Canoeing | Men's K-2 1000 metres | October 28 |
| Gold | Mary Spencer | Boxing | Women's light heavyweight | October 28 |
| Gold | Richard Dalton | Canoeing | Men's C-1 200 metres | October 29 |
| Gold | Ryan Cochrane; Hugues Fournel | Canoeing | Men's K-2 200 metres | October 29 |
| Gold | Mandy Bujold | Boxing | Women's flyweight | October 29 |
| Gold | Canada national rugby sevens team: Tyler Ardon; Nanyak Dala; Sean Duke; Matt Evans; Ciaran Hearn; Nathan Hirayama; Phil Mack; John Moonlight; Taylor Paris; Mike Scholz; Conor Trainor; Sean White | Rugby sevens | Men's tournament | October 30 |
| Silver | Max Platon | Cycling | Men's cross-country | October 15 |
| Silver | Roberta Byng-Morris; Thomas Dvorak; Tina Irwin; Crystal Kroetch | Equestrian | Team Dressage | October 16 |
| Silver | Katrina Cameron; Rose Cossar; Alexandra Landry; Anastasiya Muntyanu; Anjelika Reznik; Kelsey Titmarsh | Gymnastics | Rhythmic Group All-Around | October 16 |
| Silver | Spencer Crowley; Kai Langerfield; Blake Parsons; David Wakulich | Rowing | Men's coxless four | October 17 |
| Silver | Samantha Cornett | Squash | Women's singles | October 17 |
| Silver | Lindsay Boddez | Shooting | Women's trap | October 18 |
| Silver | Katrina Cameron; Rose Cossar; Alexandra Landry; Anastasiya Muntyanu; Anjelika Reznik; Kelsey Titmarsh | Gymnastics | Rhythmic Group 3 ribbons + 2 hoops | October 18 |
| Silver | Melanie Kok; Barbara McCord; Isolda Penney; Audra Vair | Rowing | Women's quad sculls | October 19 |
| Silver | Peter McClelland; Steven Van Knotsenburg; David Wakulich; Kai Langerfield; Blake Parsons; Spencer Crowley; Joshua Morris; Benjamin De Wit; Mark Laidlaw | Rowing | Men's eight | October 19 |
| Silver | Joycelyn Ko | Badminton | Women's singles | October 20 |
| Silver | Shawn Delierre; Andrew Schnell; Shahier Razik | Squash | Men's team | October 21 |
| Silver | Caroline Lapierre; Ashley McGregor; Gabrielle Soucisse; Brenna MacLean; Kierra Smith; Samantha Corea; Erin Miller; Jennifer Beckberger | Swimming | Women's 4 × 100m Medley Relay | October 21 |
| Silver | Crispin Duenas | Archery | Men's individual | October 22 |
| Silver | Whitney McClintock | Water skiing | Women's overall | October 22 |
| Silver | Tonya Verbeek | Wrestling | Women's Freestyle 55 kg | October 22 |
| Silver | Jason McClintock | Water skiing | Men's tricks | October 23 |
| Silver | Whitney McClintock | Water skiing | Women's slalom | October 23 |
| Silver | Jason McClintock | Water skiing | Men's slalom | October 23 |
| Silver | Whitney McClintock | Water skiing | Women's jump | October 23 |
| Silver | Selena O'Hanlon; Rebecca Howard; Jessica Phoenix; Hawley Bennett; James Atkinson | Equestrian | Team eventing | October 23 |
| Silver | Canada women's national softball team | Softball | Women's tournament | October 23 |
| Silver | Sunny Dhinsa | Wrestling | Men's Freestyle 120 kg | October 23 |
| Silver | Sultana Frizell | Athletics | Women's hammer throw | October 24 |
| Silver | Kristina Vaculik; Peng-Peng Lee; Coralie Leblond-Chartrand; Mikaela Gerber; Dominique Pegg; Talia Chiarelli | Gymnastics | Women's artistic team all-around | October 24 |
| Silver | Angela Whyte | Athletics | Women's 100 metres hurdles | October 26 |
| Silver | Jennifer Willis-Park | Bowling | Women's individual | October 27 |
| Silver | Richard Dessureault-Dober; Philippe Duchesneau; Steven Jorens; Connor Taras | Canoeing | Men's K-4 1000 metres | October 27 |
| Silver | Meaghan Benfeito; Roseline Filion | Diving | Women's synchronized 10 metre platform | October 27 |
| Silver | Alanna Goldie; Monica Peterson; Kelleigh Ryan; Sandra Sassine | Fencing | Women's team foil | October 27 |
| Silver | Catherine Roberge | Judo | Women's 78 kg | October 27 |
| Silver | Émilie Fournel | Canoeing | Women's K-1 500 metres | October 28 |
| Silver | Etienne Lalonde; Anthony Prymack; Nicolas Teisseire; Tigran Bajgoric | Fencing | Men's team foil | October 28 |
| Silver | Mikaela Gerber | Gymnastics | Women's floor | October 28 |
| Silver | Kristina Vaculik | Gymnastics | Women's balance beam | October 28 |
| Silver | Canada women's national water polo team | Water polo | Women's tournament | October 28 |
| Silver | Canada men's national water polo team | Water polo | Men's tournament | October 29 |
| Silver | Canada men's national field hockey team | Field hockey | Men's tournament | October 29 |
| Silver | Jennifer Abel; Émilie Heymans | Diving | Women's synchronized 3 metre springboard | October 29 |
| Silver | Sherraine Schalm; Ainsley Switzer; Sandra Sassine; Daria Jorqera | Fencing | Women's team épée | October 29 |
| Silver | Joseph Polossifakis; Philippe Beaudry; Vincent Couturier; Anthony Prymack | Fencing | Men's team sabre | October 29 |
| Bronze | Amanda Sin | Cycling | Women's cross-country | October 15 |
| Bronze | Jennifer Beckberger; Caroline Lapierre; Ashley McGregor; Paige Schultz; Gabrielle Soucisse | Swimming | Women's 4 × 100m Freestyle Relay | October 15 |
| Bronze | Laura Brown | Cycling | Women's Road Time Trial | October 16 |
| Bronze | Katrina Cameron; Rose Cossar; Alexandra Landry; Anastasiya Muntyanu; Anjelika Reznik; Kelsey Titmarsh | Gymnastics | Rhythmic Group 5 balls | October 17 |
| Bronze | Stephanie Edmison; Miranda Ranieri | Squash | Women's doubles | October 16 |
| Bronze | Miranda Ranieri | Squash | Women's singles | October 17 |
| Bronze | Shawn Delierre | Squash | Men's singles | October 17 |
| Bronze | Sarah Bonikowsky; Sandra Kisil | Rowing | Women's coxless pair | October 17 |
| Bronze | Barbara McCord; Audra Vair | Rowing | Women's double sculls | October 17 |
| Bronze | Ashley McGregor | Swimming | Women's 100 metre breaststroke | October 17 |
| Bronze | Isolda Penney | Rowing | Women's single sculls | October 18 |
| Bronze | Peter McClelland; Steven Van Knotsenburg | Rowing | Men's coxless pair | October 18 |
| Bronze | Travis King; Terence McKall | Rowing | Men's lightweight double sculls | October 18 |
| Bronze | Adrian Liu; Derrick Ng | Badminton | Men's doubles | October 18 |
| Bronze | Grace Gao; Jocelyn Ko | Badminton | Women's doubles | October 18 |
| Bronze | François Coulombe-Fortier | Taekwondo | Men's +80 kg | October 18 |
| Bronze | Mariam Chamilova | Gymnastics | Rhythmic individual club | October 18 |
| Bronze | Vincent Gagnon | Racquetball | Men's singles | October 21 |
| Bronze | Timothy Landeryou; Kristofer Odegard | Racquetball | Men's doubles | October 21 |
| Bronze | Karen Stevens | Water skiing | Women's overall | October 22 |
| Bronze | Steven Takahashi | Wrestling | Men's Freestyle 55 kg | October 23 |
| Bronze | Karen Stevens | Water skiing | Women's slalom | October 23 |
| Bronze | Brent McMahon | Triathlon | Men's individual | October 23 |
| Bronze | Karen Stevens | Water skiing | Women's jump | October 23 |
| Bronze | Jeffrey Adamson | Wrestling | Men's Freestyle 84 kg | October 23 |
| Bronze | Matt Gentry | Wrestling | Men's Freestyle 74 kg | October 24 |
| Bronze | Khetag Pliev | Wrestling | Men's Freestyle 96 kg | October 24 |
| Bronze | Monica Peterson | Fencing | Women's foil | October 24 |
| Bronze | Mian Hussain | Boxing | Men's Welterweight | October 25 |
| Bronze | Kristina Vaculik | Gymnastics | Women's artistic individual all-around | October 26 |
| Bronze | Joseph Polossifakis | Fencing | Men's sabre | October 26 |
| Bronze | Mian Hussain | Boxing | Men's Middleweight | October 26 |
| Bronze | Sandra Bizier | Boxing | Women's light welterweight | October 26 |
| Bronze | Meaghan Benfeito | Diving | Women's 10 metre platform | October 26 |
| Bronze | Caroline Lagrange | Bowling | Women's individual | October 27 |
| Bronze | Malindi Elmore | Athletics | Women's 1500 metres | October 27 |
| Bronze | Shaun Dhillon | Karate | Men's +84 kg | October 27 |
| Bronze | Olivia Grant | Karate | Men's +68 kg | October 27 |
| Bronze | Tigran Bajgoric; Igor Gantsevich; Vincent Pelletier; Étienne Turbide | Fencing | Men's team épée | October 27 |
| Bronze | George Kobaladze | Weightlifting | Men's +105 kg | October 27 |
| Bronze | Antoine Valois | Judo | Men's 81 kg | October 27 |
| Bronze | Alexandre Emond | Judo | Men's 90 kg | October 27 |
| Bronze | Philippe Duchesneau | Canoeing | Men's K-1 1000 metres | October 28 |
| Bronze | Alexandru Sorin | Karate | Men's 84 kg | October 28 |
| Bronze | Hugh Smith | Gymnastics | Men's vault | October 28 |
| Bronze | Nicholas Tritton | Judo | Men's 73 kg | October 28 |
| Bronze | Joliane Melançon | Judo | Women's 57 kg | October 28 |
| Bronze | Stéfanie Tremblay | Judo | Women's 63 kg | October 28 |

== Archery ==
Canada has qualified a full team of six athletes (three men and three women). The team was officially announced on September 15.

Men's

| Athlete | Event | Ranking Round | | Round of 32 | Round of 16 | Quarterfinals | Semifinals | Final |
| Athlete | Event | Score | Seed | Opposition Score | Opposition Score | Opposition Score | Opposition Score | Opposition Score |
|---|---|---|---|---|---|---|---|---|
| Crispin Duenas | Men's individual | 1337 | 2 | Cristobal Merlos (ESA); W 6 – 0 | Jaime Quintana (CUB); W 6 – 0 | Jake Kaminski (USA); W 6 – 0 | Daniel Pineda (COL); W 6 – 4 | Brady Ellison (USA); L 4 – 6 (silver) |
| Jason Lyon | Men's individual | 1321 | 7 | Daniel Pacheco (COL); W 7 – 3 | Jake Kaminski (USA); L 3 – 7 | did not advance | | |
| Patrick Rivest-Bunster | Men's individual | 1251 | 20 | Luiz Trainin (BRA); L 3 – 7 | did not advance | | | |
| Crispin Duenas; Jason Lyon; Patrick Rivest-Bunster | Men's team | 3909 | 3 | | | Colombia; W 211 – 210 | Mexico; L 218 – 220 | Cuba; L 204 – 217 |

Women

| Athlete | Event | Ranking Round | | Round of 32 | Round of 16 | Quarterfinals | Semifinals | Final |
| Athlete | Event | Score | Seed | Opposition Score | Opposition Score | Opposition Score | Opposition Score | Opposition Score |
|---|---|---|---|---|---|---|---|---|
| Marie-Pier Beaudet | Women's individual | 1289 | 6 | Fatima Rocha de Carvalho (BRA); W 6 – 0 | Mariana Avita (MEX); W 7 – 3 | Aída Román (MEX); L 0 – 6 | did not advance | |
| Kateri Vrakking | Women's individual | 1286 | 7 | Yerubi Suarez (VEN); W 6 – 0 | Heather Koehl (USA); W 6 – 4 | Miranda Leek (USA); L 2 – 6 | did not advance | |
| Vanessa Lee (archer) | Women's individual | 1210 | 24 | Denisse van Lamoen (CHI); L 2 – 6 | did not advance | | | |
| Marie-Pier Beaudet; Kateri Vrakking; Vanessa Lee (archer) | Women's team | 3785 | 4 | | | Cuba; L 197 – 199 | did not advance | |

== Athletics ==
Canada will be sending a team of seventeen athletes (six male and eleven female). According to the coach of the Canadian team Les Gramantik the team will not be the best available, "due to scheduling it is very difficult to send all of our best athletes."

Men

| Athlete | Event | Preliminaries | | Semifinals | | Final | |
| Athlete | Event | Result | Rank | Result | Rank | Result | Rank |
|---|---|---|---|---|---|---|---|
| Dontae Richards-Kwok | 100 m | 10.61 | 5 | Did Not Advance | | | |
| Dontae Richards-Kwok | 200 m | 21.26 | 4 Q | 21.11 | 6 | Did Not Advance | |
| Tremaine Harris | 400 m | | | 48.21 | 6 | Did Not advance | |
| Tremaine Harris; Philip Osei; Dontae Richards-Kwok; Michael Robertson | 4 × 400 m relay | | | 3:08.51 | 2 Q | 3:07.12 SB | 5 |
| Jason Wurster | Pole vault | | | | | 5.20 | 7 |
| Dylan Armstrong | Shot put | | | | | 21.30 PR | 1st place, gold medalist(s) |

Women

| Athlete | Event | Preliminaries | | Semifinals | | Final | |
| Athlete | Event | Result | Rank | Result | Rank | Result | Rank |
|---|---|---|---|---|---|---|---|
| Kerri-Ann Mitchell | 100 m | | | 11.81 | 6 | Did Not advance | |
| Christie Gordon | 100 m hurdles | | | 13.36 | 3 Q | 13.48 | 7 |
| Angela Whyte | 100 m hurdles | | | 13.18 | 2 Q | 13.09 | 2nd place, silver medalist(s) |
| Christian Brennan | 400 m | | | 53.34 | 6 | Did Not advance | |
| Malindi Elmore | 1500 m | | | | | 4:27.57 | 3rd place, bronze medalist(s) |
| Sultana Frizell | Hammer throw | | | | | 70.11 | 2nd place, silver medalist(s) |
| Crystal Smith | Hammer throw | | | | | 60.26 | 10 |
| Krysha Bayley | Long jump | | | | | 6.36 | 6 |
| Victoria Robson | Pole vault | | | | | 4.10 | 7 |

== Badminton ==
Canada as the top ranked nation in the Pan American Badminton Confederation, has qualified eight athletes (four men and four women. The official team was announced on September 26.

Men

| Athlete | Event | First round | Second round | Third round | Quarterfinals | Semifinals | Final | Rank |
| Athlete | Event | Opposition Result | Opposition Result | Opposition Result | Opposition Result | Opposition Result | Opposition Result | Rank |
|---|---|---|---|---|---|---|---|---|
| Toby Ng | Men's singles | BYE | K Cordón (GUA); L 0–2 (11–21, 11–21) | did not advance | | | | N/R |
| Stephan Wojcikiewicz | Men's singles | BYE | L dos Santos (BRA); W 2–0 (21–13, 21–13) | N Javier (DOM); W 2–0 (21–13, 21–16) | O Guerrero (CUB); L 1–2 (21–10, 20–22, 18–21) | did not advance | | N/R |
| Adrian Liu; Derrick Ng | Men's doubles | | | L Camacho (VEN); K Matute (VEN); W 2–0 (21–5, 21–6) | J Castillo (MEX); A Ocegueda (MEX); W 2–0 (21–13, 21–14) | H Haryanto Ho (USA); S Pongnairat (USA); L 0–2 (20–22, 14–21) | DNA | 3rd place, bronze medalist(s) |

Women

| Athlete | Event | First round | Second round | Third round | Quarterfinals | Semifinals | Final | Rank |
| Athlete | Event | Opposition Result | Opposition Result | Opposition Result | Opposition Result | Opposition Result | Opposition Result | Rank |
|---|---|---|---|---|---|---|---|---|
| Michelle Li | Women's singles | BYE | F Silva (BRA); W 2–0 (21–10, 21–14) | A de León (GUA); W 2–0 (21–14, 21–6) | I Wang (USA); W 2–0 (21–15, 21–16) | V Montero (MEX); W 2–0 (21–10, 21–7) | J Ko (CAN); W 2–0 (21–12, 21–13) | 1st place, gold medalist(s) |
| Joycelyn Ko | Women's singles | BYE | M Ugalde (MEX); W 2–0 (21–11, 21–19) | D Santana (PUR); W 2–0 (21–9, 21–7) | L Vicente (BRA); W 2–0 (21–11, 21–12) | C Rivero (PER); W 2–1 (21–9, 17–21, 21–10) | M Li (CAN); L 0–2 (12–21, 13–21) | 2nd place, silver medalist(s) |
| Grace Gao; Joycelyn Ko | Women's doubles | | BYE | C Macaya (CHI); N Norambuena (CHI); W 2–0 (21–5, 21–14) | L Duany (PER); A Monteverde (PER); W 2–0 (21–11, 21–7) | I Wang (USA); R Wang (USA); L 1–2 (10–21, 21–10, 12–21) | DNA | 3rd place, bronze medalist(s) |
| Alex Bruce; Michelle Li | Women's doubles | | BYE | N Rangel (MEX); M Ugalde (MEX); W 2–0 (21–13, 21–16) | O Cabrera (DOM); B Vibieca (DOM); W 2–0 (21–4, 21–5) | E Lee (USA); P Obañana (USA); W 2–1 (12–21, 21–16, 21–19) | I Wang (USA); R Wang (USA); W 2–0 (21–15, 21–15) | 1st place, gold medalist(s) |

Mixed

| Athlete | Event | First round | Second round | Quarterfinals | Semifinals | Final | Rank |
| Athlete | Event | Opposition Result | Opposition Result | Opposition Result | Opposition Result | Opposition Result | Rank |
|---|---|---|---|---|---|---|---|
| Toby Ng; Grace Gao | Mixed doubles | BYE | M Cuba (PER); L Duany (PER); W 2–0 (22–20, 21–12) | M Wongsodikromo (SUR); C Leefmans (SUR); W 2–0 (21–9, 21–11) | H Bach (USA); P Obañana (USA); W 2–1 (21–11, 19–21, 21–14) | H Haryanto Ho (USA); E Lee (USA); W 2–1 (21–13, 9–21, 21–17) | 1st place, gold medalist(s) |
| Derrick Ng; Alex Bruce | Mixed doubles | L Uzcategui (VEN); G Araujo (VEN); W 2–0 (21–6, 21–11) | H Haryanto Ho (USA); E Lee (USA); L 0–2 (17–21, 9–21) | did not advance | | | N/R |

== Baseball ==
By finishing sixth at the 2010 Pan American Games qualifying tournament Canada has qualified a baseball team, for the first time since 1999. The team will be made up of twenty-four athletes and was announced on September 16.

Team

| Pos. | No. | Player | Date of birth (age) | Bats | Throws | Club |
|---|---|---|---|---|---|---|
| P | 27 | Andrew Albers | October 6, 1985 (age 40) | | | (United States) Minnesota Twins (AA) |
| C | 28 | Cole Armstrong | August 24, 1983 (age 42) | | | (United States) Los Angeles Angels of Anaheim (AAA) |
| IF | 16 | Chris Bisson | August 14, 1989 (age 36) | | | (United States) San Diego Padres (A) |
| IF | 32 | Shawn Bowman | December 9, 1984 (age 41) | | | (United States) Atlanta Braves (AAA) |
| P | 22 | Nick Bucci | January 16, 1990 (age 36) | | | (United States) Milwaukee Brewers (A) |
| OF | 31 | Michael Crouse | November 22, 1990 (age 35) | | | (Canada) Toronto Blue Jays (A) |
| IF | 17 | Emerson Frostad | January 13, 1983 (age 43) | | | (United States) Houston Astros (AAA) |
| P | 38 | Mark Hardy | May 3, 1988 (age 38) | | | (United States) San Diego Padres (A) |
| P | 19 | Jimmy Henderson | October 21, 1982 (age 43) | | | (United States) Milwaukee Brewers (AAA) |
| P | 40 | Shawn Hill | April 28, 1981 (age 45) | | | Free agent |
| P | 20 | Jay Johnson | December 21, 1989 (age 36) | | | (United States) Philadelphia Phillies (A) |
| P | 10 | Mike Johnson | October 3, 1975 (age 50) | | | Free agent |
| P | 21 | Chris Kissock | May 2, 1985 (age 41) | | | (United States) Philadelphia Phillies (AA) |
| OF | 18 | Brock Kjeldgaard | January 22, 1986 (age 40) | | | (United States) Milwaukee Brewers (AA) |
| OF | 23 | Marcus Knecht | June 21, 1990 (age 35) | | | (Canada) Toronto Blue Jays (A) |
| P | 24 | Kyle Lotzkar | October 24, 1989 (age 36) | | | (United States) Cincinnati Reds (A) |
| IF | 11 | Jonathan Malo | September 23, 1983 (age 42) | | | (United States) New York Mets (AA) |
| P | 35 | Dustin Molleken | August 21, 1984 (age 41) | | | (United States) Colorado Rockies (AAA) |
| P | 48 | Scott Richmond | August 30, 1979 (age 46) | | | (Canada) Toronto Blue Jays (AAA) |
| C | 30 | Chris Robinson | May 12, 1984 (age 42) | | | (United States) Chicago Cubs (AAA) |
| OF | 26 | Jamie Romak | September 30, 1985 (age 40) | | | (United States) Kansas City Royals (AA) |
| OF | 14 | Tim Smith | June 14, 1986 (age 39) | | | (United States) Kansas City Royals (AA) |
| IF | 7 | Skyler Stromsmoe | March 30, 1984 (age 42) | | | (United States) San Francisco Giants (AA) |
| IF | 29 | Jimmy Van Ostrand | August 7, 1984 (age 41) | | | (United States) Houston Astros (AA) |

Group B

| Pos | Team | W | L | RF | RA | RD | PCT | GB | Qualification |
|---|---|---|---|---|---|---|---|---|---|
| 1 | Cuba | 3 | 0 | 22 | 16 | +6 | 1.000 | — | Advance to Semifinals |
| 2 | Canada | 2 | 1 | 14 | 14 | 0 | .667 | 1 | Advance to Semifinals |
| 3 | Venezuela | 1 | 2 | 14 | 15 | −1 | .333 | 2 | |
| 4 | Puerto Rico | 0 | 3 | 17 | 22 | −5 | .000 | 3 | |

| October 19, 2011; 10:00 | Canada | 5 – 4 | Puerto Rico | Pan American Baseball Stadium, Lagos de Moreno |
| October 19, 2011; 10:00 | | http://200.57.183.69/ENG/BB/BBR173A_BBM40040010200001ENG.htm | | Pan American Baseball Stadium, Lagos de Moreno |

| October 20, 2011; 19:00 | Canada | 5 – 9 | Cuba | Pan American Baseball Stadium, Lagos de Moreno |
| October 20, 2011; 19:00 | | http://200.57.183.69/ENG/BB/BBR173A_BBM40040010200004ENG.htm | | Pan American Baseball Stadium, Lagos de Moreno |

| October 22, 2011; 10:00 | Venezuela | 1 – 4 | Canada | Pan American Baseball Stadium, Lagos de Moreno |
| October 22, 2011; 10:00 | | http://200.57.183.69/ENG/BB/BBR173A_BBM40040010200006ENG.htm | | Pan American Baseball Stadium, Lagos de Moreno |

=== Semifinals ===
| October 24, 2011; 19:00 | Canada | 5 – 3 | Mexico | Pan American Baseball Stadium, Lagos de Moreno |
| October 24, 2011; 19:00 | | Boxscore | | Pan American Baseball Stadium, Lagos de Moreno |

=== Gold medal match ===
| October 25, 2011; 19:00 | United States | 1 – 2 | Canada | Pan American Baseball Stadium, Lagos de Moreno |
| October 25, 2011; 19:00 | | http://200.57.183.69/ENG/BB/BBR173A_BBM40040040100001ENG.htm | | Pan American Baseball Stadium, Lagos de Moreno |

== Basketball ==
Canada has automatically qualified a men's and women's basketball teams. Each team will be made up of twelve athletes for a total of twenty-four. The teams selected were from the national developmental team.

Men

The roster was announced on October 4.

Roster

- Boris Bakovic
- Kyle Desmarais
- Tyson Hinz
- Cole Hobin
- Jahmal Jones
- Owen Klassen
- Michael Lieffers
- Lien Phillip
- Phil Scrubb
- Warren Ward
- Nathan Yu

Group A

| Pos | Team | Pld | W | L | PF | PA | PD | Pts | Qualification |
|---|---|---|---|---|---|---|---|---|---|
| 1 | Puerto Rico | 3 | 2 | 1 | 231 | 206 | +25 | 5 (Note: Puerto Rico 73–69 Mexico) | Advance to Semifinals |
| 2 | Mexico (H) | 3 | 2 | 1 | 231 | 194 | +37 | 5 | Advance to Semifinals |
| 3 | Canada | 3 | 1 | 2 | 206 | 238 | −32 | 4 (Note: Canada 83–79 Argentina) | |
| 4 | Argentina | 3 | 1 | 2 | 214 | 244 | −30 | 4 | |

(H) Hosts
Notes:

October 26
10:30

Report

| Canada | 83–79 (OT) | Argentina |
Scoring by quarter: 16–22, 18–17, 10–14, 26–17, Overtime: 13–9
| Pts: Scrubb, 35; Rebs: Ward, 10; Asts: Scrubb, 3 | | Pts: Laprovíttola, 16; Rebs: Espinoza, 7 Asts: Cequeira, 4 |

CODE Dome, Guadalajara
Referees: Vazquez (URU), Rodriguez (VEN), Stith (USA)

October 27
17:30

Report

| Canada | 65–79 | Mexico |
Scoring by quarter: 7–22, 14–17, 19–21–18, 19–25
| Pts: Ward 20; Rebs: Klassen 9 Asts: Jones 5 | | Pts: Mariscal 16; Rebs: Real 15; Asts: Meza 6 |

CODE Dome, Guadalajara
Referees: Vazquez (URU), Stith (USA), Hayles (JAM)

October 28
10:30

Report

| Puerto Rico | 80–58 | Canada |
Scoring by quarter: 19–21, 9–21, 15–19, 15–19
| Pts: Barea 25; Rebs: Balkman 8 Asts: Berdiel 8 | | Pts: Ward 15; Rebs: Phillip 6 Asts: Lieffers 3 |

CODE Dome, Guadalajara
Referees: Rodriguez (VEN), Aracena (DOM), Fernandez (CUB)

Fifth place match

October 29
17:30

Report

| Canada | 56–74 | Brazil |
Scoring by quarter: 21–22, 15–14, 9–17, 11–21
| Pts: Scrubb 10; Rebs: Sandes 12; Asts: Jones, Yu 2 | | Pts: Machado 19; Rebs: 3 players 6 Asts: Machado, Santos 3 |

CODE Dome, Guadalajara
Referees: Aracena (DOM), Fernandez (CUB), Dorame (MEX)

2011 Pan American Games 6th

Canada

Women

The roster was announced on October 4.

Roster

- Taijah Campbell
- Justine Colley
- Paige Crozon
- Jill Humbert
- Alex Kiss-Rusk
- Lindsay Ledingham
- Megan Pinske
- Raelyn Prince
- Isidora Purkovic
- Kellie Ring
- Kadie Riverin
- Emma Wolfram

Group B

| Pos | Team | Pld | W | L | PF | PA | PD | Pts | Qualification |
|---|---|---|---|---|---|---|---|---|---|
| 1 | Brazil | 3 | 3 | 0 | 280 | 140 | +140 | 6 | Advance to Semifinals |
| 2 | Colombia | 3 | 2 | 1 | 195 | 169 | +26 | 5 | Advance to Semifinals |
| 3 | Canada | 3 | 1 | 2 | 206 | 166 | +40 | 4 | |
| 4 | Jamaica | 3 | 0 | 3 | 89 | 295 | −206 | 3 | |

October 21
10:30

Report

| Brazil | 78–53 | Canada |
Scoring by quarter: 24–15, 19–10, 14–22, 21–6
| Pts: Marques, 16; Rebs: 2 players, 10; Asts: 3 players, 3 | | Pts: Colley, 14; Rebs: Colley, 7 Asts: 4 players, 2 |

CODE Dome, Guadalajara

October 22
13:00

Report

| Canada | 57–59 | Colombia |
Scoring by quarter: 9–9, 23–16, 9–15, 16–19
| Pts: Tatham, 17; Rebs: Pinske, 11; Asts: 2 players, 4 | | Pts: Mosquera, 21; Rebs: Martinez, 7 Asts: 2 players, 3 |

CODE Dome, Guadalajara

October 23
17:30

Report

| Canada | 96–29 | Jamaica |
Scoring by quarter: 17–8, 32–6, 20–13, 27–2
| Pts: Colley, 16; Rebs: Wolfram, 11; Asts: 6 players, 3 | | Pts: Dixon, 13; Rebs: Dixon, 7 Asts: 3 players, 1 |

CODE Dome, Guadalajara

Fifth place match

October 24
17:30

Report

| Argentina | 50–38 | Canada |
Scoring by quarter: 17–4, 6–9, 16–13, 11–12
| Pts: Reggiardo, 17; Rebs: Burani, 8 Asts: Pavón, 2 | | Pts: Colley, 11; Rebs: Wolfram, 7 Asts: Colley, 3 |

CODE Dome, Guadalajara

2011 Pan American Games 6th

Canada

== Beach volleyball ==
Canada has qualified a men's and's women's pairs, by virtue of being in the top ten in each gender of the NORCECA beach volleyball rankings. The Canadian team was announced on September 9, 2011.

Men

| Athlete | Event | Preliminary round | | | Quarterfinals | Semifinals | Finals |
| Athlete | Event | Opposition Score | Opposition Score | Opposition Score | Opposition Score | Opposition Score | Opposition Score |
|---|---|---|---|---|---|---|---|
| Ben Saxton; Christian Redmann | Men's | Guillermo Federico Williman (URU); Nicolas Zanotta (URU); W 21-17, 21-19 | Dany Antonio Lopez (NCA); Gerald Gerardo Umaña (NCA); W 24-22, 21-13 | Aldo Albino Miramontes (MEX); Juan Ramon Virgen (MEX); L 26-28, 23-25 | did not advance | | |

Women

| Athlete | Event | Preliminary round | | | Quarterfinals | Semifinals | Finals |
| Athlete | Event | Opposition Score | Opposition Score | Opposition Score | Opposition Score | Opposition Score | Opposition Score |
|---|---|---|---|---|---|---|---|
| Elizabeth Maloney; Heather Bansley | Women's | Ana Maria Gallay (ARG); Maria Virginia Zonta (ARG); W 18-21, 22-20, 15-6 | Yarlin Santiago (PUR); Yamileska Yantin (PUR); L 19-21, 18-21 | Marcela Alejandra Avalos (ESA); Diana Ivonne Romero (NCA); W 21-10, 21-8 | Larissa França (BRA); Juliana Silva (BRA); L 15-21, 16-21 | did not advance | |

== Bowling ==
Canada has qualified a full team of two men and two women The team was announced on October 4, 2011.

Men
Individual

| Athlete | Event | Qualification | | | | | | | | | | | | | | | Eighth Finals | Quarterfinals | Semifinals | Finals |
| Athlete | Event | Block 1 (Games 1–6) | | | | | | Block 2 (Games 7–12) | | | | | | Total | Average | Rank | Eighth Finals | Quarterfinals | Semifinals | Finals |
| Athlete | Event | 1 | 2 | 3 | 4 | 5 | 6 | 7 | 8 | 9 | 10 | 11 | 12 | Total | Average | Rank | Opposition Scores | Opposition Scores | Opposition Scores | Opposition Scores |
|---|---|---|---|---|---|---|---|---|---|---|---|---|---|---|---|---|---|---|---|---|
| Mark Buffa | Men's individual | 170 | 182 | 246 | 232 | 206 | 237 | 179 | 203 | 162 | 154 | 227 | 168 | 2366 | 197.2 | 18 | did not advance | | | |
| Art Oliver | Men's individual | 214 | 175 | 217 | 215 | 235 | 216 | 160 | 212 | 174 | 209 | 214 | 198 | 2439 | 203.3 | 16 | Chris Barnes (USA); L 587 – 655 | did not advance | | |

Pairs

| Athlete | Event | Block 1 (Games 1–6) | | | | | | | | Block 2 (Games 7–12) | | | | | | | | Grand Total | Final Rank |
| Athlete | Event | 1 | 2 | 3 | 4 | 5 | 6 | Total | Average | 7 | 8 | 9 | 10 | 11 | 12 | Total | Average | Grand Total | Final Rank |
|---|---|---|---|---|---|---|---|---|---|---|---|---|---|---|---|---|---|---|---|
| Mark Buffa; Art Oliver | Men's pairs | 243 | 138 | 155 | 172 | 206 | 232 | 1146 | 191.0 | 210 | 234 | 223 | 193 | 166 | 191 | 2363 | 196.9 | 4797 | 5 |
| Mark Buffa; Art Oliver | Men's pairs | 244 | 171 | 212 | 199 | 206 | 263 | 1295 | 215.8 | 171 | 234 | 169 | 194 | 189 | 182 | 2434 | 202.8 | 4797 | 5 |

Women
Individual

| Athlete | Event | Qualification | | | | | | | | | | | | | | | Eighth Finals | Quarterfinals | Semifinals | Finals |
| Athlete | Event | Block 1 (Games 1–6) | | | | | | Block 2 (Games 7–12) | | | | | | Total | Average | Rank | Eighth Finals | Quarterfinals | Semifinals | Finals |
| Athlete | Event | 1 | 2 | 3 | 4 | 5 | 6 | 7 | 8 | 9 | 10 | 11 | 12 | Total | Average | Rank | Opposition Scores | Opposition Scores | Opposition Scores | Opposition Scores |
|---|---|---|---|---|---|---|---|---|---|---|---|---|---|---|---|---|---|---|---|---|
| Caroline Lagrange | Women's individual | 223 | 258 | 237 | 278 | 166 | 199 | 169 | 200 | 186 | 197 | 182 | 213 | 2508 | 209.0 | 3 | Anggie Ramírez (COL); W 619 – 608 | Stephanie Martins (BRA); W 573 – 535 | Jennifer Willis-Park (CAN); L 546 – 577 (bronze) | Did not advance |
| Jennifer Willis-Park | Women's individual | 194 | 196 | 214 | 199 | 267 | 195 | 157 | 214 | 232 | 178 | 156 | 187 | 2389 | 199.1 | 7 | Tashaïna Seraus (ARU); W 621 – 591 | Patricia De Faria (VEN); W 668 – 535 | Caroline Lagrange (CAN); W 577 – 546 | Elizabeth Ann Johnson (USA); L 386 – 467 (silver) |

Pairs

| Athlete | Event | Block 1 (Games 1–6) | | | | | | | | Block 2 (Games 7–12) | | | | | | | | Grand Total | Final Rank |
| Athlete | Event | 1 | 2 | 3 | 4 | 5 | 6 | Total | Average | 7 | 8 | 9 | 10 | 11 | 12 | Total | Average | Grand Total | Final Rank |
|---|---|---|---|---|---|---|---|---|---|---|---|---|---|---|---|---|---|---|---|
| Caroline Lagrange; Jennifer Willis-Park | Women's pairs | 176 | 234 | 209 | 204 | 194 | 158 | 1175 | 195.8 | 195 | 233 | 267 | 256 | 225 | 190 | 2541 | 211.8 | 4827 | 4 |
| Caroline Lagrange; Jennifer Willis-Park | Women's pairs | 190 | 188 | 224 | 210 | 190 | 190 | 1192 | 198.7 | 206 | 166 | 187 | 166 | 167 | 202 | 2286 | 190.5 | 4827 | 4 |

== Boxing ==
Canada has qualified seven boxers. The team was announced on October 4.

Men

| Athlete | Event | Preliminaries | Quarterfinals | Semifinals | Final |
| Athlete | Event | Opposition Result | Opposition Result | Opposition Result | Opposition Result |
|---|---|---|---|---|---|
| Joey Laviolette | Bantamweight | Alberto Ezequiel Melian (ARG); L 8 – 20 | did not advance | | |
| Mian Hussain | Welterweight | Emmanuel De Jesus (PUR); W 20 – 13 | Luis Ángel Miranda (PER); W 21 – 8 | Óscar Molina (MEX); L 7 – 14 (bronze) | did not advance |
| Brody Blair | Middleweight | | Jose Mario Bernal (ESA); W 24 – 12 | Emilio Correa (CUB); L 7 – 30 (bronze) | did not advance |
| Steven Couture | Heavyweight | Manuel Mariñez (DOM); W 18 – 16 | Lenier Eunice Pero (CUB); L 2 – 22 | did not advance | |

Women

| Athlete | Event | Quarterfinals | Semifinals | Final |
| Athlete | Event | Opposition Result | Opposition Result | Opposition Result |
|---|---|---|---|---|
| Mandy Bujold | Flyweight | Silvia Torres (MEX); W 13 – 6 | Pamela Paola Benavidez (ARG); W 12 – 8 | Ingrit Valencia (COL); W 11 – 5 (gold) |
| Sandra Bizier | Light welterweight | | Erika Rosalba Cruz (MEX); L 6 – 12 (bronze) | did not advance |
| Mary Spencer | Light heavyweight | Franchon Rebecca Crews (USA); W 17 – 7 | Alma Nora Ibara (MEX); W 19 – 5 | Yenebier Guillén Benitez (COL); W 15 – 11 (gold) |

== Canoeing ==
Canada has qualified a full team of sixteen athletes. The final team was announced on October 4.

Men

| Athlete | Event | Heats | | Semifinals | | Final | |
| Athlete | Event | Time | Rank | Time | Rank | Time | Rank |
|---|---|---|---|---|---|---|---|
| Connor Tarras | K-1 200 m | 36.445 | 1 QF | | | 36.766 | 6 |
| Ryan Cochrane; Hugues Fournel | K-2 200 m | 31.928 | 1 QF | | | 32.375 | 1st place, gold medalist(s) |
| Philippe Duchesneau | K-1 1000 m | | | | | 3:44.504 | 3rd place, bronze medalist(s) |
| Steven Jorens; Richard Dober Jr. | K-2 1000 m | | | | | 3:17.230 | 1st place, gold medalist(s) |
| Steven Jorens; Richard Dober Jr. Philippe Duchesneau; Connor Tarras | K-4 1000 m | | | | | 3:02.653 | 2nd place, silver medalist(s) |
| Richard Dalton | C-1 200 m | 40.249 | 1 QF | | | 40.333 | 1st place, gold medalist(s) |
| Roland Varga | C-1 1000 m | | | | | DSQ | |
| Gabriel Beauchesne-Sévigny; Andrew Russell | C-2 1000 m | | | | | 3:56.489 | 5 |

Women

| Athlete | Event | Heats | | Semifinals | | Final | |
| Athlete | Event | Time | Rank | Time | Rank | Time | Rank |
|---|---|---|---|---|---|---|---|
| Kia Byers | K-1 200 m | 42.130 | 2 QF | | | 43.021 | 4 |
| Émilie Fournel | K-1 500 m | 1:57.386 | 1 QF | | | 1:54.900 | 2nd place, silver medalist(s) |
| Kathleen Fraser; Kristin Gauthier | K-2 500 m | 1:50.059 | 2 QF | | | 1:49.638 | 5 |
| Kathleen Fraser; Kristin Gauthier; Una Lounder; Alexa Irvin | K-4 500 m | | | | | 1:37.724 | 1st place, gold medalist(s) |

== Cycling ==
Canada has qualified to send seventeen athletes in all four disciplines.

=== Road cycling ===
Men

| Athlete | Event | Final | |
| Athlete | Event | Time | Rank |
|---|---|---|---|
| Rémi Pelletier | Time trial | 52:01.07 | 9 |
| Robert Britton | Time trial | 52:19.66 | 12 |
| Guillaume Boivin | Road race | 3:44:17 | 11 |
| Rob Britton | Road race | 3:50:58 | 30 |
| Rémi Pelletier | Road race | 3:50:58 | 32 |
| Jean-Michel Lachance | Road race | DNF | |

Women

| Athlete | Event | Final | |
| Athlete | Event | Time | Rank |
|---|---|---|---|
| Laura Brown | Time trial | 28:24.00 | 3rd place, bronze medalist(s) |
| Denise Ramsden | Time trial | 28:38.08 | 7 |
| Laura Brown | Road race | 2:19:57 | 28 |
| Joëlle Numainville | Road race | 2:18:23 | 6 |
| Denise Ramsden | Road race | 2:18:23 | 22 |

=== Track cycling ===
Men

Sprints & Pursuit

| Athlete | Event | Qualifying | | Round of 16 | 1/8 finals (repechage) | Quarterfinals | Semifinals | Final | |
| Athlete | Event | Time Speed (km/h) | Rank | Opposition Time Speed | Opposition Time Speed | Opposition Time Speed | Opposition Time Speed | Opposition Time Speed | Rank |
|---|---|---|---|---|---|---|---|---|---|
| Robert Leslie William Britton; Jean-Michel Lachance; Rémi Pelletier-Roy; Jacob Dylan Schwingboth | Men's team pursuit | 4:14.389 | 5 | | | | | did not advance | |
| Jean-Michel Lachance; Rémi Pelletier-Roy; Jacob Dylan Schwingboth | Men's team sprint | 48.460 | 6 | | | | | did not advance | |
| Laura Brown; Jasmin Glaesser; Stephanie Roorda | Women's team pursuit | 3:25.093 RP | 1 | | | | | 3:21.448 | 1st place, gold medalist(s) |

Omnium

| Athlete | Event | Flying Lap Time Rank | Points Race Points Rank | Elimination Race Rank | Ind Pursuit Time | Scratch Race Rank | Time Trial Time | Final Rank |
|---|---|---|---|---|---|---|---|---|
| Jacob Dylan Schwingboth | Men | 13.550; 4 | 11; 8 | 10 | did not finish | | | |
| Stephanie Roorda | Women | 14.706; 2 | 13; 7 | 6 | 3:37.544 RP; 1 | 7 | 48.401; 5 | 28; 4 |

=== Mountain biking ===
Men

| Athlete | Event | Time | Rank |
|---|---|---|---|
| Max Platon | Cross-country | 1:31:29 | 2nd place, silver medalist(s) |
| Derek Zandstra | Cross-country | 8 | 1:38:21 |

Women

| Athlete | Event | Time | Rank |
|---|---|---|---|
| Mikaela Kofman | Cross-country | 1:38:08 | 4 |
| Amanda Sin | Cross-country | 1:37:14 | 3rd place, bronze medalist(s) |

=== BMX ===
Men

| Athlete | Event | Qualifying Run 1 | | Qualifying Run 2 | | Qualifying Run 3 | | Qualifying | Semifinal | | Final | |
| Athlete | Event | Time | Points | Time | Points | Time | Points | Points | Points | Rank | Time | Rank |
|---|---|---|---|---|---|---|---|---|---|---|---|---|
| James Brown | Individual | 1:14.330 | 6 | 37.121 | 3 | 35.917 | 3 | 12 QS | 34.639 | 2 QF | 40.263 | 8 |

== Diving ==
Canada will send eight divers to compete.

Men

| Athlete | Event | Preliminary | | Final | |
| Athlete | Event | Points | Rank | Points | Rank |
|---|---|---|---|---|---|
| François Imbeau-Dulac | Men's 3m Springboard | 422.80 | 8 QF | 443.05 | 5 |
| Reuben Ross | Men's 3m Springboard | 437.05 | 5 QF | 419.50 | 8 |
| Kevin Geyson | Men's 10m Platform | 431.75 | 4 QF | 330.00 | 10 |
| Eric Sehn | Men's 10m Platform | 368.30 | 9 QF | 413.50 | 7 |
| Eric Sehn; Reuben Ross | Men's 3m Synchro | | | 360.99 | 6 |
| Eric Sehn; Kevin Geyson | Men's 10m Synchro Platform | | | 399.93 | 3rd place, bronze medalist(s) |

Women

| Athlete | Event | Preliminary | | Final | |
| Athlete | Event | Points | Rank | Points | Rank |
|---|---|---|---|---|---|
| Jennifer Abel | Women's 3m Springboard | 339.80 | 3 QF | 347.55 | 5 |
| Émilie Heymans | Women's 3m Springboard | 288.50 | 6 QF | 325.90 | 7 |
| Meaghan Benfeito | Women's 10m Platform | 321.30 | 4 QF | 358.20 | 3rd place, bronze medalist(s) |
| Roseline Filion | Women's 10m Platform | 322.50 | 3 QF | 345.65 | 4 |
| Jennifer Abel; Émilie Heymans | Women's 3m Synchro | | | 336.30 | 2nd place, silver medalist(s) |
| Meaghan Benfeito; Roseline Filion | Women's 10m Synchro Platform | | | 318.66 | 2nd place, silver medalist(s) |

== Equestrian ==
=== Dressage ===
Canada has qualified a full dressage team.

| Athlete | Horse | Event | Round 1 | | Round 2 | | Final | | | |
| Athlete | Horse | Event | Score | Rank | Score | Rank | Score | Rank | Total Score | Rank |
|---|---|---|---|---|---|---|---|---|---|---|
| Roberta Byng-Morris | Reiki Tyme | Individual | 65.184 | 25 | 66.947 | 16 | DNQ | – | – | – |
| Tom Dvorak | Viva's Salieri W | Individual | 71.711 | 5 | 73.079 | 4 | 77.300 | 4 | 75.190 | 4 |
| Tina Irwin | Winston | Individual | 70.737 | 7 | 70.842 | 10 | 77.225 | 5 | 74.034 | 5 |
| Crystal Kroetch | Lymrix | Individual | 68.790 | 11 | 71.000 | 9 | 76.325 | 6 | 73.663 | 7 |
| Roberta Byng-Morris; Tom Dvorak; Tina Irwin; Crystal Kroetch | as above | Team | | | | | | | 70.413 | 2nd place, silver medalist(s) |

=== Eventing ===
Canada has named a squad of five athletes in eventing.

| Athlete | Horse | Event | Dressage | | Cross-country | | Jumping | | | | Total | |
| Athlete | Horse | Event | Dressage | | Cross-country | | Qualifier | | Final | | Total | |
| Athlete | Horse | Event | Penalties | Rank | Penalties | Rank | Penalties | Rank | Penalties | Rank | Penalties | Rank |
|---|---|---|---|---|---|---|---|---|---|---|---|---|
| James Atkinson | Gustav | Individual | 53.70 | 15 | 61.70 | 10 | 65.70 | 10 | 65.70 | 7 | 65.70 | 7 |
| Hawley Bennett-Awad | Five O'Clock Somewhere | Individual | 53.20 | 13 | 79.60 | 22 | 79.60 | 19 | did not advance | | | |
| Rebecca Howard | Roquefort | Individual | 51.30 | 8 | 54.90 | 7 | 62.90 | 9 | 62.90 | 6 | 62.90 | 6 |
| Selena O'Hanlon | Foxwood High | Individual | 52.20 | 10 | 72.20 | 18 | 79.60 | 18 | did not advance | | | |
| Jessica Phoenix | Pavarotti | Individual | 43.90 | 1 | 43.90 | 1 | 43.90 | 1 | 43.90 | 1 | 43.90 | 1st place, gold medalist(s) |
| James Atkinson; Hawley Bennett-Awad; Rebecca Howard; Selena O'Hanlon; Jessica Phoenix | as above | Team | 147.40 | 2 | 160.50 | 2 | 172.50 | 2 | | | 172.50 | 2nd place, silver medalist(s) |

=== Jumping ===
Canada has named a squad of four athletes in jumping.

Individual

| Athlete | Horse | Event | Ind. Round 1 | | Ind. Round 2 | | | Ind. Round 3 | | | Final | | | | | |
| Athlete | Horse | Event | Ind. Round 1 | | Ind. Round 2 | | | Ind. Round 3 | | | Round A | | Round B | | Total | |
| Athlete | Horse | Event | Penalties | Rank | Penalties | Total | Rank | Penalties | Total | Rank | Penalties | Rank | Penalties | Rank | Penalties | Rank |
|---|---|---|---|---|---|---|---|---|---|---|---|---|---|---|---|---|
| Jonathan Asselin | Showgirl | Individual | 6.10 | 31 | 1.00 | 7.10 | 16 | 4.00 | 11.10 | 16 | 12.10 | 9 | 17.10 | 9 | 17.10 | 9 |
| Jill Henselwood | George | Individual | 7.61 | 37 | 8.00 | 15.61 | 30 | 0.00 | 15.61 | 22 | did not advance | | | | | |
| Eric Lamaze | Sidoline Van de Centaur | Individual | 3.03 | 11 | 4.00 | 7.03 | 15 | 4.00 | 11.03 | 15 | 15.03 | 14 | 19.03 | 11 | 19.03 | 11 |
| Ian Millar | In Style | Individual | 3.79 | 13 | 0.00 | 3.79 | 8 | 0.00 | 3.79 | 7 | 3.79 | 5 | did not finish | | | |

Team

| Athlete | Horse | Event | Qualifying round | | Final | | | | | |
| Athlete | Horse | Event | Qualifying round | | Round 1 | | Round 2 | | Total | |
| Athlete | Horse | Event | Penalties | Rank | Penalties | Rank | Penalties | Rank | Penalties | Rank |
|---|---|---|---|---|---|---|---|---|---|---|
| Jonathan Asselin; Jill Henselwood; Eric Lamaze; Ian Millar | as above | Team | 12.92 | 5 | 17.92 | 4 | 21.92 | 4 | 21.92 | 4 |

== Fencing ==
Canada has qualified a team of sixteen athletes (nine men and seven women).

Men

| Event | Athlete | Round of Poules | | Round of 16 | Quarterfinals | Semifinals | Final |
| Event | Athlete | Result | Seed | Opposition Score | Opposition Score | Opposition Score | Opposition Score |
|---|---|---|---|---|---|---|---|
| Tigran Bajgoric | Individual épée | 3V – 2D | 9 Q | Andrés Campos (COL); W 15 – 11 | Silvio Fernández (VEN); L 10 – 15 | did not advance | |
| Vincent Pelletier | Individual épée | 2V – 3D | 12 Q | Rubén Limardo (VEN); L 7 – 15 | did not advance | | |
| Vincent Pelletier; Tigran Bajgoric; Igor Gantsevich | Team épée | | | | Mexico; W 45 – 28 | Venezuela; L 39 – 40 | Bronze Medal match Chile; W 45 – 27 (bronze) |
| Étienne Lalonde-Turbide | Individual foil | 3V – 2D | 8 Q | Federico Muller (ARG); W 15 – 8 | Guilherme Toldo (BRA); L 7 – 15 | did not advance | |
| Anthony Prymack | Individual foil | 4V – 1D | 3 Q | Yosnier Alvarez (CUB); W 15 – 12 | Antonio Leal (VEN); L 12 – 15 | did not advance | |
| Étienne Lalonde-Turbide; Anthony Prymack; Nicolas Teisseire | Team foil | | | | Venezuela; W 45 – 22 | Brazil; W 45 – 40 | United States; L 35 – 45 (silver) |
| Philippe Beaudry | Individual sabre | 2V – 3D | 9 Q | James Williams (USA); W 15 – 14 | Alexander Achten (ARG); W 15 – 13 | Hernán Jansen (VEN); W 15 – 3 | Timothy Morehouse (USA); W 15 – 14 (gold) |
| Joseph Polossifakis | Individual sabre | 2V – 3D | 10 Q | Carlos Jose Bravo (VEN); W 15 – 5 | Renzo Agresta (BRA); W 15 – 12 | Timothy Morehouse (USA); L 9 – 15 (bronze) | did not advance |
| Philippe Beaudry; Vincent Couturier; Joseph Polossifakis | Team sabre | | | | Mexico; W 45 – 25 | Venezuela; W 45 – 31 | United States; L 35 – 45 (silver) |

Women

| Event | Athlete | Round of Poules | | Round of 16 | Quarterfinals | Semifinals | Final |
| Event | Athlete | Result | Seed | Opposition Score | Opposition Score | Opposition Score | Opposition Score |
|---|---|---|---|---|---|---|---|
| Sherraine Schalm | Individual épée | 2V – 3D | 11 Q | Violeta Ramírez (DOM); W 15 – 7 | Elida Aguero (ARG); L 14 – 15 | did not advance | |
| Ainsley Switzer | Individual épée | 3V – 2D | 5 Q | Zuleydis Ortiz (CUB); W 15 – 10 | Courtney Hurley (USA); L 10 – 15 | did not advance | |
| Daria Jorquera Palmer; Sherraine Schalm; Ainsley Switzer | Team épée | | | | Chile; W 45 – 35 | Mexico; W 45 – 37 | United States; L 36 – 45 (silver) |
| Alanna Goldie | Individual foil | 4V – 1D | 5 Q | Carmen Nuñez (DOM); W 15 – 7 | Monica Peterson (CAN); L 12 – 15 | did not advance | |
| Monica Peterson | Individual foil | 4V – 1D | 4 Q | Kristal Bas (PUR); W 15 – 6 | Alanna Goldie (CAN); W 15 – 12 | Nzingha Prescod (USA); L 6 – 15 (bronze) | did not advance |
| Alanna Goldie; Monica Peterson; Kelleigh Ryan | Team foil | | | | Cuba; W 45 – 33 | Venezuela; W 45 – 31 | United States; L 24 – 45 (silver) |
| Sandra Sassine | Individual sabre | 3V – 2D | 6 Q | Rossy Félix (DOM); W 15 – 13 | Eileen Grench (PAN); L 13 – 15 | did not advance | |

== Field hockey ==
Canada has qualified a men's and women's field hockey team. Each team will be made up of sixteen athletes for a total of thirty-two.

=== Men ===
Canada's men's field hockey team are the defending Pan American Games champion, and have been drawn to play against Chile, Trinidad and Tobago and Barbados. The team was announced on September 21.

Team

- David Carter
- Adam Froese
- Jagdish Gill
- Matthew Guest
- Richard Hildreth
- David Jameson
- Antoni Kindler
- Mark Pearson
- Ken Pereira
- Keegan Pereira
- Rob Short
- Gabbar Singh
- Iain Smythe
- Scott Tupper
- Jesse Watson
- Philip Wright

Pool A

| Pos | Team | Pld | W | D | L | GF | GA | GD | Pts | Qualification |
|---|---|---|---|---|---|---|---|---|---|---|
| 1 | Canada | 3 | 3 | 0 | 0 | 21 | 2 | +19 | 9 | Semi-finals |
| 2 | Chile | 3 | 2 | 0 | 1 | 12 | 6 | +6 | 6 | Semi-finals |
| 3 | Trinidad and Tobago | 3 | 1 | 0 | 2 | 14 | 11 | +3 | 3 | |
| 4 | Barbados | 3 | 0 | 0 | 3 | 2 | 30 | −28 | 0 | |

Source: PAHF

October 20, 2011
09:00

| Canada | 7 – 2 | Trinidad and Tobago |
|---|---|---|
| Guest 2', 37', 46'; Tupper 26'; Smythe 29', 30'; Wright 62' | Report | Scipio 1'; Browne 35' |

Pan American Hockey Stadium
Umpires:
Barbas (ARG), Soteriades II (USA)

October 22, 2011
16:00

| Chile | 0 – 4 | Canada |
|---|---|---|
| | Report | Tupper 15', 49', 56'; Short 61' |

Pan American Hockey Stadium
Umpires:
Lopez (URU), Barbas (ARG)

October 24, 2011
09:00

| Canada | 10 – 0 | Barbados |
|---|---|---|
| Froese 3'; Pereira 10'; Guest 10', 16', 62'; Tupper 25', 35', 46'; Pearson 49'; Short 54' | Report |

Pan American Hockey Stadium
Umpires:
Soteriades II (USA), Scala (ARG)

Semi-finals

October 27, 2011
11:30

| Canada | 3 – 2 | Cuba |
|---|---|---|
| Guest 1'; Tupper 6'; Singh 21' | Report | Blanco 14'; Lemus 49' |

Pan American Hockey Stadium
Umpires:
Barbas (ARG), Hundley (USA)

Gold medal match

October 29, 2011
17:30

| Canada | 1 – 3 | Argentina |
|---|---|---|
| Tupper 25' | Report | Bergner 45'; Ibarra 49'; L. Vila 53' |

Pan American Hockey Stadium
Umpires:
Wright (RSA), Hundley (USA)

=== Women ===
Canada's women's field hockey have been drawn to play against defending Pan American Games champion Argentina, Trinidad and Tobago and Barbados. Canada's roster was named on August 19. The roster includes three returning members of the team that placed fifth at the 2007 Pan American Games in Rio de Janeiro.

Team

- Abigail Raye
- Azelia Liu
- Danielle Hennig
- Diana Roemer
- Hannah Haughn
- Jessalyn Walkey
- Kate Gillis
- Katie Baker
- Kaitlyn Williams
- Kristine Wishart
- Natalie Sourisseau
- Samantha Smith
- Sara McManus
- Stephanie Jameson
- Thea Culley
- Tyla Flexman

Pool A

| Team | Pld | W | D | L | GF | GA | GD | Pts |
|---|---|---|---|---|---|---|---|---|
| Argentina (A) | 3 | 3 | 0 | 0 | 37 | 3 | +34 | 9 |
| Canada (A) | 3 | 2 | 0 | 1 | 15 | 8 | +7 | 6 |
| Barbados | 3 | 1 | 0 | 2 | 4 | 31 | −27 | 3 |
| Trinidad and Tobago | 3 | 0 | 0 | 3 | 3 | 17 | −14 | 0 |

(A) Advanced to the semifinals

October 19, 2011
11:00

| Canada | 10 – 0 | Barbados |
|---|---|---|
| Stairs 5', 26', 45'; Baker 16'; Culley 20', 68'; Gilis 30'; Haughn 31'; Roemer 37'; Raye 61' | Report |

Pan American Hockey Stadium
Umpires:
Judefind (USA)
Perez(USA)

October 21, 2011
16:00

| Canada | 3 – 7 | Argentina |
|---|---|---|
| Culley 6'; Haughn 30'; Gillis 35' | Report | García 15', 25'; Aymar 16', 23'; Barrionuevo 41', 53'; Rebecchi 63' |

Pan American Hockey Stadium
Umpires:
Metchette (IRL)
Montesino (CHI)

October 23, 2011
11:00

| Trinidad and Tobago | 1 – 2 | Canada |
|---|---|---|
| Quesnay 8' | Report | Stairs 61'; Gillis 68' |

Pan American Hockey Stadium
Umpires:
Judefind (USA)
Castellanos (MEX)

Semi-finals

October 26, 2011
15:00

| United States | 4 – 2 | Canada |
|---|---|---|
| Laubach 9', 43'; Cesan 21'; Kasold 58' | Report | Stairs 7', 45' |

Pan American Hockey Stadium
Umpires:
De La Fuente (ARG), Perez (USA)

Bronze medal match

October 28, 2011
15:00

| Chile | 3 – 0 | Canada |
|---|---|---|
| Urroz 27'; Caram 42'; Infante 67' | Report |

Pan American Hockey Stadium
Umpires:
Hudson (NZL), De La Fuente (ARG)

== Football ==
=== Women ===
Canada has qualified a women's football team and it will consist of 18 athletes. Canada drew defending champions Brazil, Costa Rica and Argentina. The team was officially announced on September 26.

==== Team ====
- Rachelle Beanlands
- Melanie Booth
- Candace Chapman
- Robyn Gayle
- Christina Julien
- Kaylyn Kyle
- Karina LeBlanc
- Vanessa Legault-Cordisco
- Diana Matheson
- Kelly Parker
- Sophie Schmidt
- Desiree Scott
- Lauren Sesselmann
- Diamond Simpson
- Christine Sinclair
- Brittany Timko
- Rhian Wilkinson
- Shannon Woeller

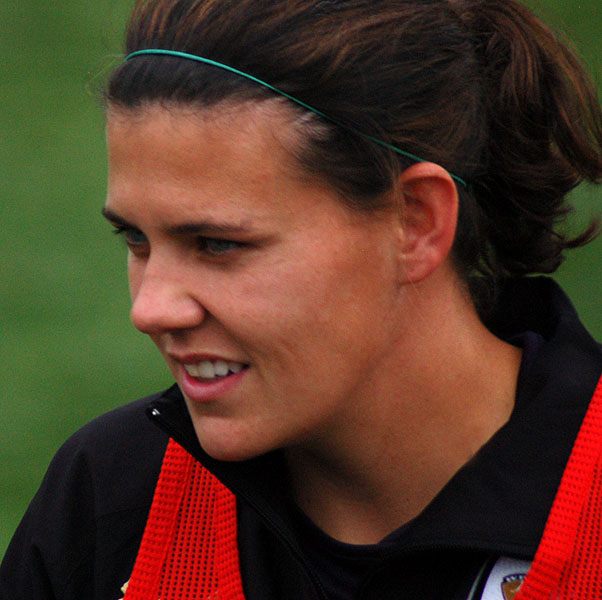
Christine Sinclair was selected to carry the flag during the opening ceremony.

==== Group B ====
| Pos | Team | Pld | W | D | L | GF | GA | GD | Pts | Qualification |
|---|---|---|---|---|---|---|---|---|---|---|
| 1 | Brazil | 3 | 2 | 1 | 0 | 4 | 1 | +3 | 7 | Advance to Semifinals |
| 2 | Canada | 3 | 2 | 1 | 0 | 4 | 1 | +3 | 7 | Advance to Semifinals |
| 3 | Costa Rica | 3 | 0 | 1 | 2 | 5 | 8 | −3 | 1 | |
| 4 | Argentina | 3 | 0 | 1 | 2 | 3 | 6 | −3 | 1 | |

October 18, 2011
11:00

| Canada | 3–1 | Costa Rica |

Estadio Omnilife, Guadalajara

October 20, 2011
10:00

| Canada | 1–0 | Argentina |

Estadio Omnilife, Guadalajara

October 22, 2011
20:00

| Brazil | 0–0 | Canada |

Estadio Omnilife, Guadalajara

==== Semifinals ====
October 25, 2011
20:00

| Colombia | 1 – 2 | Canada |
|---|---|---|
| Usme 81' | Report | Kyle 47'; Gayle 88' |

Estadio Omnilife, Guadalajara
Referee: Jessica Di Orio (Argentina)

==== Gold medal match ====
October 27, 2011
17:45

| Brazil | 1 – 1 (a.e.t.) | Canada |
|---|---|---|
| De Oliveira 3' | Report | Sinclair 87' |
Penalties
| Alberto (penalty scored); Goncalves (penalty scored); Nascimento (penalty missed); Wiggers (penalty scored); De Oliveira (penalty missed) | 3 – 4 | (penalty scored) Matheson; (penalty scored) Sinclair; (penalty scored) Booth; (penalty scored) Schmidt; (penalty missed) Chapman |

Estadio Omnilife, Guadalajara
Referee: Diane Ferreiras (Guyana)

2011 Pan American Games Gold Medal

Canada

== Gymnastics ==
=== Artistic ===
Canada has qualified a full team of six men and six women. Canada's men's team will be a B team.

Men

Individual qualification & Team Finals

| Athlete | Event | Apparatus | | | | | | Qualification | | Final | |
| Athlete | Event | Floor | Pommel horse | Rings | Vault | Parallel bars | Horizontal bar | Total | Rank | Total | Rank |
|---|---|---|---|---|---|---|---|---|---|---|---|
| Mathieu Csukassy | Ind Qualification | | 12.650 | | | 13.050 | 11.800 | 37.500 | 53 | | |
| Tariq Dowers | Ind Qualification | 13.800 | 13.650 | 13.100 | 15.150 | 13.550 | 13.400 | 82.650 | 14 | | |
| Anderson Loran | Ind Qualification | 14.300 | 13.900 | 12.800 | 15.150 | 13.300 | 13.550 | 83.000 | 11 | | |
| Scott Morgan | Ind Qualification | 14.650 | | 14.250 | 15.400 | | | 44.300 | 49 | | |
| Jason Scott | Ind Qualification | 14.300 | 13.900 | 13.300 | 14.450 | 13.050 | 12.600 | 81.600 | 16 | | |
| Hugh Smith | Ind Qualification | 14.400 | 13.600 | 13.950 | 16.100 | 13.500 | 13.150 | 84.700 | 7 | | |
| Team Totals; Four Best Scores | Team All-around | 57.650 | 55.050 | 54.600 | 61.800 | 53.400 | 52.700 | | | 335.200 | 5 |

Individual Finals

| Athlete | Event | Apparatus | | | | | | Final | |
| Athlete | Event | Floor | Pommel horse | Rings | Vault | Parallel bars | Horizontal bar | Total | Rank |
|---|---|---|---|---|---|---|---|---|---|
| Jason Scott | Individual Pommel Horse | | 13.425 | | | | | 13.425 | 4 |
| Scott Morgan | Individual Floor | 14.675 | | | | | | 14.675 | 4 |
| Scott Morgan | Individual Vault | | | | 15.575 | | | 15.575 | 3rd place, bronze medalist(s) |
| Anderson Loran | Individual All-around | 13.700 | 13.550 | 13.450 | 15.300 | 12.950 | 14.100 | 83.050 | 7 |
| Hugh Smith | Individual All-around | 14.450 | 13.350 | 13.750 | 16.100 | 12.500 | 12.350 | 82.500 | 9 |
| Hugh Smith | Individual Vault | | | | 15.575 | | | 15.575 | 3rd place, bronze medalist(s) |

Women

Canada will send six women artistic gymnasts.

Individual qualification & Team Finals

| Athlete | Event | Apparatus | | | | Qualification | | Final | |
| Athlete | Event | Vault | Uneven bars | Balance Beam | Floor | Total | Rank | Total | Rank |
|---|---|---|---|---|---|---|---|---|---|
| Talia Chiarelli | Ind Qualification | 14.225 | 1.150 | 13.675 | 13.575 | 52.625 | 13 | | |
| Mikaela Gerber | Ind Qualification | 13.700 | 11.950 | 13.550 | 13.950 | 53.150 | 7 | | |
| Coralie Leblond-Chartrand | Ind Qualification | 14.100 | 12.475 | 12.475 | 13.025 | 52.075 | 18 | | |
| Peng-Peng Lee | Ind Qualification | 13.875 | 14.275 | 13.675 | 13.500 | 55.325 | 2 | | |
| Dominique Pegg | Ind Qualification | | | | | | | | |
| Kristina Vaculik | Ind Qualification | 13.850 | 12.725 | 14.275 | 13.775 | 54.625 | 3 | | |
| Team Totals; Four Best Scores | Team All-around | 56.050 | 51.425 | 55.175 | 54.800 | | | 217.450 | 2nd place, silver medalist(s) |

Individual Finals

| Athlete | Event | Apparatus | | | | Final | |
| Athlete | Event | Vault | Uneven bars | Balance Beam | Floor | Total | Rank |
|---|---|---|---|---|---|---|---|
| Kristina Vaculik | Individual All-around | 13.800 | 13.775 | 13.775 | 13.425 | 54.775 | 3rd place, bronze medalist(s) |
| Kristina Vaculik | Individual Balance Beam | | | 13.925 | | 13.925 | 2nd place, silver medalist(s) |
| Kristina Vaculik | Individual Floor | 13.500 | | | | 13.500 | 4 |
| Peng-Peng Lee | Individual All-around | 14.025 | 12.900 | 13.975 | 13.675 | 54.575 | 4 |
| Peng-Peng Lee | Individual Uneven Bars | | 13.575 | | | 13.575 | 5 |
| Mikaela Gerber | Individual Floor | 13.775 | | | | 13.775 | 2nd place, silver medalist(s) |
| Talia Chiarelli | Individual Balance Beam | | | 13.075 | | 13.075 | 5 |

=== Rhythmic ===
Canada has qualified a full team of eight gymnasts (six in group and two in individual) in rhythmic gymnastics.

Individual

| Athlete | Event | Final | | | | | |
| Athlete | Event | Hoop | Ball | Clubs | Ribbon | Total | Rank |
|---|---|---|---|---|---|---|---|
| Mariam Chamilova | Individual | 24.550 | 23.175 | 24.225 | 23.225 | 95.175 | 4 |
| Mariam Chamilova | Hoop | 24.100 | | | | 24.100 | 4 |
| Mariam Chamilova | Ball | | 24.625 | | | 24.625 | 4 |
| Mariam Chamilova | Clubs | | | 24.525 | | 24.525 | 3rd place, bronze medalist(s) |
| Mariam Chamilova | Ribbon | | | | 24.000 | 24.000 | 5 |
| Maria Kitkarska | Individual | 23.350 | 23.825 | 22.850 | 23.400 | 93.425 | 6 |
| Maria Kitkarska | Ball | | 23.625 | | | 23.625 | 7 |
| Maria Kitkarska | Clubs | | | 23.975 | | 23.975 | 6 |
| Maria Kitkarska | Ribbon | | | | 23.050 | 23.050 | 7 |

Group

| Athletes | Event | Final | | | |
| Athletes | Event | 5 balls | 3 ribbons & 2 hoops | Total | Rank |
|---|---|---|---|---|---|
| Katrina Cameron; Rose Cossar; Alexandra Landry; Anastasiya Muntyanu; Anjelika Reznik; Kelsey Titmarsh | Group all-around | 24.450 | 23.500 | 47.950 | 2nd place, silver medalist(s) |
| Katrina Cameron; Rose Cossar; Alexandra Landry; Anastasiya Muntyanu; Anjelika Reznik; Kelsey Titmarsh | Group 5 Balls | 24.625 | | 24.625 | 3rd place, bronze medalist(s) |
| Katrina Cameron; Rose Cossar; Alexandra Landry; Anastasiya Muntyanu; Anjelika Reznik; Kelsey Titmarsh | Group 3 Ribbons & 2 Hoops | | 24.650 | 24.650 | 2nd place, silver medalist(s) |

=== Trampoline ===
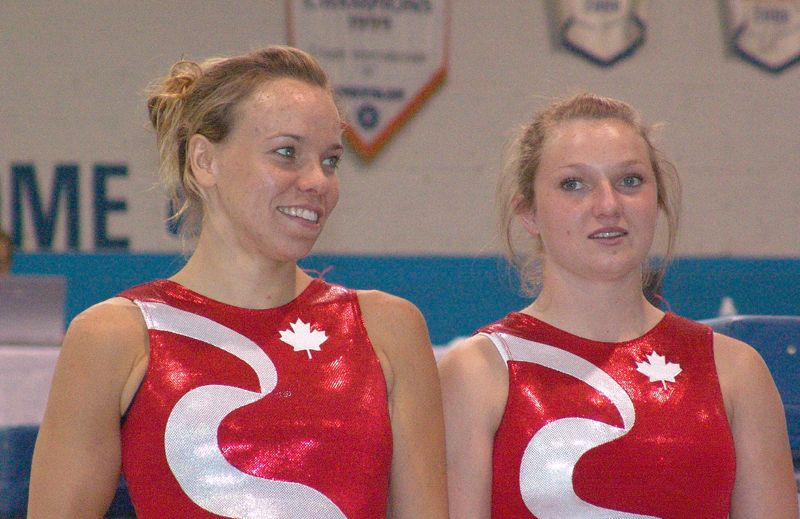
Karen Cockburn and Rosannagh MacLennan made up the women's trampoline team.

Canada has qualified a full team of four gymnasts in trampoline (two male and two female).

Men

| Athlete | Event | Qualification | | Final | |
| Athlete | Event | Score | Rank | Score | Rank |
|---|---|---|---|---|---|
| Keegan Soehn | Individual | 104.030 | 1 Q | 55.535 | 1st place, gold medalist(s) |
| Charles Thibault | Individual | 94.335 | 3 Q | DNS | |

Women

| Athlete | Event | Qualification | | Final | |
| Athlete | Event | Score | Rank | Score | Rank |
|---|---|---|---|---|---|
| Karen Cockburn | Individual | 102.390 | 1 Q | DNS | |
| Rosannagh MacLennan | Individual | 101.195 | 2 Q | 53.975 | 1st place, gold medalist(s) |

== Handball ==
Canada has qualified a men's team of 15 athletes.

Men

Canada has drawn defending champions, Brazil, Chile and Venezuela.

Team

- Zoran Bazdar
- Douglas Bennett
- Alexis Bertrand
- Geoffroy Bessette Colette
- Daniel Devlin
- Niklas Etter
- Sébastien Fyfe
- Sylvain Gaudet
- Maxime Godin
- Ryan Homsy
- Jonathan Leduc
- Sean Phillips
- Xavier Roesch
- Danny St-Laurent
- Mark Walder

Group A

| Pos | Team | Pld | W | D | L | GF | GA | GD | Pts | Qualification |
|---|---|---|---|---|---|---|---|---|---|---|
| 1 | Brazil | 3 | 3 | 0 | 0 | 119 | 54 | +65 | 6 | Semifinals |
| 2 | Chile | 3 | 2 | 0 | 1 | 101 | 89 | +12 | 4 | Semifinals |
| 3 | Canada | 3 | 1 | 0 | 2 | 70 | 113 | −43 | 2 | 5th–8th place semifinals |
| 4 | Venezuela | 3 | 0 | 0 | 3 | 68 | 102 | −34 | 0 | 5th–8th place semifinals |

Source: Guadalajara 2011
Rules for classification: 1) points; 2) head-to-head points; 3) head-to-head goal difference; 4) head-to-head goals scored; 5) goal difference; 6) goals scored; 7) draw.

| October 16; 13:00 | Brazil | 46–17 | Canada | San Rafael Gymnasium |

| October 18; 13:00 | Canada | 25–42 | Chile | San Rafael Gymnasium |

| October 20; 15:00 | Canada | 28–25 | Venezuela | San Rafael Gymnasium |

Fifth-Eighth place matches

| October 22; 12:30 | Canada | 26 – 25 | United States | San Rafael Gymnasium; Referees: Perez, Guzman (PUR) |
| October 22; 12:30 | Walder, 5 | Report | Elzoghby, 5 | San Rafael Gymnasium; Referees: Perez, Guzman (PUR) |

Fifth place match

| October 24; 12:30 | Canada | 26 – 23 | Mexico | San Rafael Gymnasium; Referees: Gonzalez, Prieto (URU) |
| October 24; 12:30 | Bessette, 9 | Report | Bermúdez, 5 | San Rafael Gymnasium; Referees: Gonzalez, Prieto (URU) |

2011 Pan American Games 5th

Canada

== Judo ==
Canada had originally qualified 13 judokas, the only category not qualifying was the +100 kg men. However, when the team was announced the 48 kg and +78 kg quotas for women were declined, therefore the team will be made up of eleven athletes.

Men

| Athlete | Event | Round of 16 | Quarterfinals | Semifinals | Final |
| Athlete | Event | Opposition Result | Opposition Result | Opposition Result | Opposition Result |
|---|---|---|---|---|---|
| Frazer Will | −60 kg | | Nabor Castillo (MEX); L 001 S3 – 010 S2 | did not advance (to repechage round) | |
| Sasha Mehmedovic | −66 kg | Humberto Alonso Wong (PER); W 002 – 001 S2 | Leandro Da Cunha (BRA); L 000 – 101 | did not advance (to repechage round) | |
| Nicholas Tritton | −73 kg | | Michael Murty Eldred (USA); W 100 – 000 S1 | Bruno Silva (BRA); L 001 S2 – 101 S1 | did not advance (to repechage round) |
| Antoine Valois-Fortier | −81 kg | | Emmanuel Lucenti (ARG); W 100 S2 – 001 | Leandro Guilheiro (BRA); L 000 S2 – 101 | did not advance (to repechage round) |
| Alexandre Emond | −90 kg | | Tiago Camilo (BRA); L 000 S3 – 100 S3 | did not advance (to repechage round) | |
| Stefan Zwiers | −100 kg | | Oreydi Despaigne (CUB); L 000 S3 – 010 | did not advance (to repechage round) | |

Repechage Rounds

| Athlete | Event | First Repechage Round | Repechage Quarterfinals | Repechage Semifinals | Bronze Final |
| Athlete | Event | Opposition Result | Opposition Result | Opposition Result | Opposition Result |
|---|---|---|---|---|---|
| Frazer Will | −60 kg | | Jhon Jairo Furrinico (COL); W 100 S2 – 011 | Kenny Godoy (HON); W 100 – 000 S1 | Aaron Kunihiro (USA); L 000 S2 – 003 S1 |
| Sasha Mehmedovic | −66 kg | | | Carlos Figueroa (ESA); W 101 – 001 | Ricardo Valderrama (VEN); L 000 – 100 |
| Nicholas Tritton | −73 kg | | | | Lee Jonathan Mata (MEX); W 100 S1 – 000 (bronze) |
| Antoine Valois-Fortier | −81 kg | | | | Osmay Cruz (CUB); W 110 – 000 (bronze) |
| Alexandre Emond | −90 kg | | | Jose Camacho (VEN); W 100 S3 – 010 S1 | Jacob Ryan Larsen (USA); W 100 S1 – 000 (bronze) |
| Stefan Zwiers | −100 kg | | Camilo Castaño (COL); L 001 S3 – 011 S2 | did not advance | |

Women

| Athlete | Event | Round of 16 | Quarterfinals | Semifinals | Final |
| Athlete | Event | Opposition Result | Opposition Result | Opposition Result | Opposition Result |
|---|---|---|---|---|---|
| Laurie Wiltshire | −52 kg | | Érika Miranda (BRA); L 000 S3 – 120 | did not advance (to repechage round) | |
| Joliane Melançon | −57 kg | | Rafaela Silva (BRA); L 000 S2 – 101 S1 | did not advance (to repechage round) | |
| Stéfanie Tremblay | −63 kg | | Yaritza Abel (CUB); L 000 – 100 | did not advance (to repechage round) | |
| Kelita Zupancic | −70 kg | Andrea Menegazzo (GUA); W 100 – 000 S1 | Lizbeth Leon (MEX); W 100 S1 – 000 S1 | Onix Cortés (CUB); L 000 – 100 | did not advance (to repechage round) |
| Catherine Roberge | −78 kg | | Anny Lorena Cortes (COL); W 100 – 000 S4 | Lorena Andrea Briceño (ARG); W 100 – 000 S4 | Kayla Jean Harrison (USA); L 001 S2 – 011 S2 (silver) |

Repechage Rounds

| Athlete | Event | First Repechage Round | Repechage Quarterfinals | Repechage Semifinals | Bronze Final |
| Athlete | Event | Opposition Result | Opposition Result | Opposition Result | Opposition Result |
|---|---|---|---|---|---|
| Laurie Wiltshire | −52 kg | | | Anrriquelys Barrios (VEN); W 110 – 000 S1 | Angelica Delgado (USA); L 000 S2 – 001 |
| Joliane Melançon | −57 kg | | | Diana Villavicencio (ECU); W 010 S1 – 001 S3 | Melissa Rodríguez (ARG); W 100 S1 – 000 (bronze) |
| Stéfanie Tremblay | −63 kg | | | Yennifer Dominguez (GUA); W 100 – 000 | Katherine Campos (BRA); W 101 S1 – 000 S2 (bronze) |
| Kelita Zupancic | −70 kg | | | | Maria Perez (PUR); L 000 S2 – 001 S1 |

== Karate ==
Canada has qualified two male athletes and two female athletes.

Men

| Athlete | Event | Round robin (Pool A/B) | | | Semifinals | Final |
| Athlete | Event | Match 1 | Match 2 | Match 3 | Semifinals | Final |
| Athlete | Event | Opposition Result | Opposition Result | Opposition Result | Opposition Result | Opposition Result |
|---|---|---|---|---|---|---|
| Sorin Alexandru | –84 kg | Yilber Ocoro (COL); HKW 0:0 | Homero Morales (MEX); HKW 0:0 | Pablo Layerla (URU); W PTS 7:0 | Cesar Herrera (VEN); L PTS 3:0 (bronze) | did not advance |
| Shaun Dhillon | +84 kg | Alberto Ramírez (MEX); HKW 0:0 | Nelson Gonzalez (PUR); W PTS 2:0 | Kwame Kinsale (MEX); HKW 0:0 | Angel Aponte (VEN); L PTS 2:0 (bronze) | did not advance |

Women

| Athlete | Event | Round robin (Pool A/B) | | | Semifinals | Final |
| Athlete | Event | Match 1 | Match 2 | Match 3 | Semifinals | Final |
| Athlete | Event | Opposition Result | Opposition Result | Opposition Result | Opposition Result | Opposition Result |
|---|---|---|---|---|---|---|
| Golrokh Khalili | –68 kg | Yaremi Borzelli (PAN); W PTS 5:0 | Alexandra Grande (PER); L PTS 9:0 | Daniela Suarez (VEN); HKW 4:4 | did not advance | |
| Olivia Grant | +68 kg | Jeanis Colzani (BRA); W PTS 2:1 | Yelsi Piña (VEN); W PTS 3:0 | Claudia Vera (CHI); L PTS 3:0 | Xunashi Caballero (MEX); L PTS 2:0 (bronze) | did not advance |

== Modern pentathlon ==
Canada has qualified a full team of 4 athletes (2 men and 2 women).

Men

| Athlete | Fencing (Épée One Touch) | | | Swimming (200m Freestyle) | | | Riding (Show Jumping) | | | Combined | | | Total Points | Final Rank |
| Athlete | Results | Rank | MP Points | Time | Rank | MP Points | Penalties | Rank | MP Points | Time | Rank | MP Points | Total Points | Final Rank |
|---|---|---|---|---|---|---|---|---|---|---|---|---|---|---|
| Chris Pietruczuk | 11 V – 13 D | 15 | 784 | 2:11.03 | 9 | 1228 | 79.98 | 4 | 1200 | 11:48.45 | 8 | 2164 | 5416 | 8 |
| Joshua Riker-Fox | 17 V – 7 D | 3 | 1000 | 2:10.23 | 8 | 1240 | 88.23 | 16 | 1148 | 12:22.14 | 15 | 2028 | 5376 | 9 |

Women

| Athlete | Fencing (Épée One Touch) | | | Swimming (200m Freestyle) | | | Riding (Show Jumping) | | | Combined | | | Total Points | Final Rank |
| Athlete | Results | Rank | MP Points | Time | Rank | MP Points | Penalties | Rank | MP Points | Time | Rank | MP Points | Total Points | Final Rank |
|---|---|---|---|---|---|---|---|---|---|---|---|---|---|---|
| Melanie McCann | 21 V – 11 D | 3 | 972 | 2:22.56 | 5 | 1092 | 70.91 | 11 | 1140 | 13:52.95 | 9 | 1672 | 4876 | 4 |
| Donna Vakalis | 13 V – 19 D | 13 | 748 | 2:26.30 | 8 | 1048 | 93.51 | 7 | 1168 | 13:38.51 | 7 | 1728 | 4692 | 10 |

== Racquetball ==
Canada has qualified a full racquetball team of 8 athletes (4 men and 4 women).

Men

| Athlete | Event | Qualifying | Round of 16 | Quarterfinals | Semifinals | Final |
| Athlete | Event | Round robin Result | Opposition Result | Opposition Result | Opposition Result | Opposition Result |
|---|---|---|---|---|---|---|
| Vincent Gagnon | Singles | Ramón de León (DOM); W 15 – 3, 15 – 4 César Castro (VEN); W 15 – 7, 15 – 7 Alejandro Herrera (COL); L 15 – 6, 5 – 15, 9 – 11 | Felipe Camacho (CRC); W 15 – 9, 15 – 11 | Luis Pérez (DOM); W 15 – 7, 15 – 9 | Gilberto Mejia (MEX); L, 11 – 15, 15 – 14, 5 – 11 (bronze) | did not advance |
| Mike Green | Singles | Luis Pérez (DOM); L 15 – 3,10 – 15, 7 – 11; Teobaldo Fumero (CRC); W 15 – 8, 15 – 11; Carlos Keller (BOL); L 10 – 15, 15 – 4, 6 – 11 | Ramón de León (DOM); W 15 – 7, 15 – 3 | Gilberto Mejia (MEX); L 13 – 15, 15 – 7, 2 – 11 | did not advance | |
| Tim Landeryou; Kris Odegard | Doubles | Raul Banegas (Honduras) Selvin Cruz (HON); W 15 – 7, 15 – 2 Daniel Maggi (Argentina) Shai Manzuri (ARG); W 15 – 10, 15 – 5 Ramón de León (Dominican Republic) Luis Pérez (DOM); W 15 – 1, 15 – 8 | | Ricardo Monroy (Bolivia) Roland Keller (BOL); W 3 – 15, 15 – 10, 11 – 8 | Jorge Hirsekorn (Venezuela) Cesar Castillo (VEN); L 15 – 9, 11 – 15, 6 – 11 (bronze) | did not advance |
| Vincent Gagnon; Mike Green; Tim Landeryou; Kris Odegard | Team | | | Ecuador; L 0 – 2, 2 – 0, 1 – 2 | did not advance | |

Women

| Athlete | Event | Qualifying | Round of 16 | Quarterfinals | Semifinals | Final |
| Athlete | Event | Round robin Result | Opposition Result | Opposition Result | Opposition Result | Opposition Result |
|---|---|---|---|---|---|---|
| Frédérique Lambert | Singles | Cristina Amaya (COL); W 15 – 6, 15 – 14; Mariana Tobon (VEN); W 15 – 1, 15 – 4 Samantha Salas (MEX); W 9 – 15, 15 – 11, 11 – 6 | Maria José Vargas (BOL); L 11 – 15, 8 – 15 | did not advance | | |
| Jennifer Saunders | Singles | Veronique Guillemette (ARG); W 15 – 2, 15 – 8 Islhey Paredes (VEN); W 15 – 6, 15 – 7 Jenny Daza (BOL); W 15 – 9, 15 – 10 | Angela Grisar (CHI); L 11 – 15, 7 – 15 | did not advance | | |
| Josée Grand'Maître; Brandi Prentice | Doubles | Cintia Loma (Bolivia) Jenny Daza (BOL); L 4 – 15, 4 – 15; Veronique Guillemette (Argentina) Dafne Macrino (ARG); L 10 – 15, 10 – 15 | Ishley Paredes (Venezuela) Mariana Tobon (VEN); W 15 – 6, 15 – 13 | Paola Longoria (Mexico) Samantha Salas (MEX); L 1 – 15, 2 – 15 | did not advance | |
| Frédérique Lambert; Jennifer Saunders; Josée Grand'Maître; Brandi Prentice | Team | | | Ecuador; L 0 – 2, 2 – 1, 1 – 2 | did not advance | |

== Roller skating ==
Canada has qualified a women's speed and artistic team, it will consist of 3 athletes.

Men

| Athlete | Event | Heats | | Final | |
| Athlete | Event | Result | Rank | Result | Rank |
|---|---|---|---|---|---|
| Travis Roy Shaw | 300 m time trial | | | 27.816 | 12 |
| Travis Roy Shaw | 1,000 m | 1:31.523 | 11 | did not advance | |
| Travis Roy Shaw | 10,000 m | | | DNF | |

Women

| Athlete | Event | Heats | | Final | |
| Athlete | Event | Result | Rank | Result | Rank |
|---|---|---|---|---|---|
| Morgane Echardour | 300 m time-trial | 30.557 | 10 | did not advance | |
| Martine Charbonneau | 1000 m | 1:37.949 | 5 Q | 1:38.054 | 6 |
| Martine Charbonneau | 10,000 m | | | DNF | |

Artistic

| Athlete | Event | Short Program | | Long Program | |
| Athlete | Event | Result | Rank | Result | Rank |
|---|---|---|---|---|---|
| Kailah Macri | Free skating | 114.10 | 5 | 115.70 | 6 |

== Rowing ==
Canada has qualified 22 athletes. The team is considered a "B" team as the group includes young and upcoming athletes with potential.

Men

| Athlete(s) | Event | Heats | | Repechage | | Final | |
| Athlete(s) | Event | Time | Rank | Time | Rank | Time | Rank |
|---|---|---|---|---|---|---|---|
| Michael Braithwaite | Singles | 7:26.04 | 3 R | 7:35.56 | 3 FB | 7:13.45 | 1 B |
| Steven Payne; Eric Bevan | Double sculls | 7:18.94 | 6 F | | | 6:47.76 | 4 |
| Terence McKall; Travis Kingg | Lightweight double sculls | 6:33.82 | 1 FA | | | 6:29.27 | 3rd place, bronze medalist(s) |
| Steven Van Knotsenburg; Peter McClelland | Pairs | 7:20.77 | 4 R | 7:01.24 | 2 FA | 6:50.80 | 3rd place, bronze medalist(s) |
| Spencer Crowley; Blake Parsons; David Wakulich; Kai Langerfeld | Fours | 6:08.10 | 1 FA | | | 6:05.65 | 2nd place, silver medalist(s) |
| Terence McKall; Travis King; Eric Woelfl; Derek Vinge | Lightweight fours | 6:17.51 | 2 FA | | | 6:13.53 | 5 |
| Steven Van Knotsenburg; Peter McClelland; Spencer Crowley; Blake Parsons; David Wakulich; Kai Langerfeld; Benjamin de Wit; Mark Laidlaw (cox) | Eights | 6:02.76 | 2 F | | | 5:41.01 | 2nd place, silver medalist(s) |

Women

| Athlete(s) | Event | Heats | | Repechage | | Final | |
| Athlete(s) | Event | Time | Rank | Time | Rank | Time | Rank |
|---|---|---|---|---|---|---|---|
| Isolda Penney | Singles | 7:53.97 | 1 FA | | | 8:06.88 | 3rd place, bronze medalist(s) |
| Audra Vair; Elizabeth McCord | Double sculls | 7:23.95 | 1 FA | | | 7:16.29 | 3rd place, bronze medalist(s) |
| Audra Vair; Elizabeth McCord; Melanie Kok; Isolda Penney | Quadruple sculls | 7:03.71 | 4 F | | | 6:37.68 | 2nd place, silver medalist(s) |
| Sandra Kisil; Sarah Bonikowsky | Pairs | 7:41.77 | 3 FA | | | 7:32.74 | 3rd place, bronze medalist(s) |

== Rugby sevens ==
Canada has qualified a team, it will consist of 12 athletes.

Roster

- Nanyak Dala
- Sean Duke
- Matt Evans
- Sean White
- Ciaran Hearn
- Nathan Hirayama
- Tyler Ardon
- Phil Mack
- John Moonlight
- Taylor Paris
- Mike Scholz
- Conor Trainor

| Team | Pld | W | D | L | PF | PA | PD | Pts |
|---|---|---|---|---|---|---|---|---|
| Canada | 3 | 3 | 0 | 0 | 109 | 28 | +81 | 12 |
| United States | 3 | 1 | 1 | 1 | 54 | 55 | −1 | 7 |
| Brazil | 3 | 1 | 1 | 1 | 33 | 71 | −38 | 7 |
| Chile | 3 | 0 | 0 | 3 | 21 | 63 | −42 | 3 |

October 29, 2011
11:25

| Canada | 45 – 0 | Brazil |
| | Report |

Tlaquepaque Stadium, Guadalajara

October 29, 2011
13:35

| Canada | 35 – 7 | Chile |
| | Report |

Tlaquepaque Stadium, Guadalajara

October 29, 2011
15:15

| United States | 21 – 29 | Canada |
| Tries: Bokhoven, Pulu, Niua; Con: Niua (3/3) | Report | Tries: Dala, Duke (2), Mack, Hearn; Con: Hirayama (2/5) |

Tlaquepaque Stadium, Guadalajara

=== Quarterfinals ===
October 30, 2011
10:15

| Canada | 45 – 0 | Mexico |
| | Report |

Tlaquepaque Stadium, Guadalajara

=== Semifinals ===
October 30, 2011
12:25

| United States | 19 – 21 | Canada |
| Tries: Scully, Unufe, Suniula; Cons: Niua (2/3) | Report | Tries: Duke, Mack, Hearn; Cons: Hirayama (3/3) |

Tlaquepaque Stadium, Guadalajara

=== Gold medal match ===
October 30, 2011
15:00

| Argentina | 24 – 26 | Canada |
| | Report |

Tlaquepaque Stadium, Guadalajara

2011 Pan American Games Gold Medal

Canada

== Sailing ==
Canada has qualified 7 boats and 13 athletes.

Men

| Athlete | Event | Race | | | | | | | | | | | Net Points | Final Rank |
| Athlete | Event | 1 | 2 | 3 | 4 | 5 | 6 | 7 | 8 | 9 | 10 | M | Net Points | Final Rank |
|---|---|---|---|---|---|---|---|---|---|---|---|---|---|---|
| Zachary Plavsic | Windsurfer (RS:X) | (6) | 4 | 4 | 6 | 6 | 5 | 5 | 4 | 5 | 6 | 6 | 51.0 | 5 |
| David Wright | Single-handed Dinghy (Laser) | 5 | 4 | (8) | 2 | 8 | 5 | 3 | 5 | 7 | 6 | / | 45.0 | 7 |

Women

| Athlete | Event | Race | | | | | | | | | | | Net Points | Final Rank |
| Athlete | Event | 1 | 2 | 3 | 4 | 5 | 6 | 7 | 8 | 9 | 10 | M | Net Points | Final Rank |
|---|---|---|---|---|---|---|---|---|---|---|---|---|---|---|
| Nikola Girke | Windsurfer (RS:X) | (4) | 3 | 3 | 4 | 4 | 4 | 4 | 4 | 2 | 3 | 6 | 37.0 | 4 |
| Isabella Bertold | Single-handed Dinghy (Laser Radial) | 3 | 5 | 3 | 4 | 3 | 6 | (11) | 4 | 5 | 2 | 4 | 39.0 | 4 |

Open

| Athlete | Event | Race | | | | | | | | | | | Net Points | Final Rank |
| Athlete | Event | 1 | 2 | 3 | 4 | 5 | 6 | 7 | 8 | 9 | 10 | M | Net Points | Final Rank |
|---|---|---|---|---|---|---|---|---|---|---|---|---|---|---|
| Peter Hall; Chantal Leger; Megan Armitage | Multi-crewed Dinghy (Lightning) | 2 | 6 | 6 | 4 | 3 | (7) | 3 | 4 | 4 | 4 | 2 | 38.0 | 4 |
| Daniel Borg; Marshall Champ | Multihull (Hobie 16) | (8) | 8 | 8 | 3 | 4 | 8 | 4 | 2 | 7 | 4 | / | 48.0 | 7 |
| Andrew Burns; Roger Burns; Graeme Clendenan; Gary Harmer | Keelboat (J/24) | (7) | 7 | 7 | 6 | 7 | 7 | 5 | 7 | 7 | 7 | / | 60.0 | 7 |

== Shooting ==
The Canadian shooting federation named a team of 18 athletes (ten male and eight female) to compete at the 2011 Pan American Games.

Men

| Athlete | Event | Qualification | | Final | |
| Athlete | Event | Score | Rank | Score | Rank |
|---|---|---|---|---|---|
| Grzegorz Sych | 50 m rifle prone three positions | 1143- 39x | 8 Q | 1240.2 | 7 |
| Grzegorz Sych | 10 m rifle air rifle | 579-33x | 16 | did not advance | |
| Michel Dion | 50 m rifle prone | 582-26x | 10 | did not advance | |
| Johannes Sauer | 50 m rifle prone | 581-29x | 11 | did not advance | |
| Cory Niefer | 10 m rifle air rifle | 588-41x | 4 Q | 688.3 | 5 |
| Metodi Igorov | 25 m rapid fire pistol | 554- 8x | 9 | did not advance | |
| Sylvain Ouellette | 10 m air pistol | 571-12x | 9 | did not advance | |
| Sylvain Ouellette | 50 m pistol | 531-11x | 18 | did not advance | |
| Ian Drew Shaw | Trap | 115 | 14 | did not advance | |
| Paul Ian Shaw | Trap | 108 | 23 | did not advance | |
| Paul Ian Shaw | Double trap | 124 | 12 | did not advance | |
| Jason Caswell | Skeet | 110 | 24 | did not advance | |
| Richard McBride | Skeet | 117 | 11 | did not advance | |

Women

| Athlete | Event | Qualification | | Final | |
| Athlete | Event | Score | Rank | Score | Rank |
|---|---|---|---|---|---|
| Monica Fyfe | 50 m rifle prone three positions | 560-13x | 17 | did not advance | |
| Monica Fyfe | 10 m rifle air rifle | 388-24x | 13 | did not advance | |
| Sharon Bowes | 50 m rifle prone three positions | 562-11x | 13 | did not advance | |
| Cindy Hamulas | 10 m rifle air rifle | 381-16x | 25 | did not advance | |
| Violetta Szyszkowski | 10 m air pistol | 371- 6x | 10 | did not advance | |
| Violetta Szyszkowski | 25 m pistol | 546-15x | 19 | did not advance | |
| Dorothy Ludwig | 10 m air pistol | 380- 7x | 2 Q | 476.8 | 1st place, gold medalist(s) |
| Lea Wachowich | 25 m pistol | 566-18x | 6 Q | 757.3 | 7 |
| Susan Nattrass | Trap | 61 | 7 | did not advance | |
| Lindsay Boddez | Trap | 65 | 5 Q | 86 | 2nd place, silver medalist(s) |

== Softball ==
Canada has qualified a softball team. The team will be made up of 17 athletes. The final roster was named on August 16, 2011. The team will also include seven officials.

Team

- Jenna Caira
- Jocelyn Cater
- Erin Cumpstone
- Heather Ebert
- Kelsey Haberl
- Victoria Hayward
- Ashley Lanz
- Danielle Lopez
- Joey Lye
- Melanie Matthews
- Sarah Phillips
- Kaleigh Rafter
- Jillian Russell
- Jennifer Salling
- Hannah Schwarz
- Megan Timpf
- Jennifer Yee

Standings
The top four teams will advance to the semifinal round.

| Qualified for the semifinals |
| Eliminated |

All times are Central Daylight Time (UTC−5)

| Rank | Team | W | L | RS | RA |
|---|---|---|---|---|---|
| 1 | United States | 7 | 0 | 54 | 6 |
| 2 | Cuba | 5 | 2 | 28 | 13 |
| 3 | Venezuela | 5 | 2 | 31 | 20 |
| 4 | Canada | 5 | 2 | 46 | 23 |
| 5 | Dominican Republic | 2 | 5 | 22 | 37 |
| 6 | Mexico | 2 | 5 | 18 | 37 |
| 7 | Puerto Rico | 2 | 5 | 27 | 42 |
| 8 | Argentina | 0 | 7 | 4 | 59 |

Results Preliminary round

| October 17, 2011; 16:00 | Canada | 10–2 | Puerto Rico | Pan American Softball Stadium, Guadalajara |

| October 18, 2011; 16:00 | Canada | 4–3 | Venezuela | Pan American Softball Stadium, Guadalajara |

| October 18, 2011; 18:00 | Canada | 2–4 | Cuba | Pan American Softball Stadium, Guadalajara |

| October 19, 2011; 9:00 | Canada | 11–0 | Argentina | Pan American Softball Stadium, Guadalajara |

| October 19, 2011; 20:00 | Mexico | 1–8 | Canada | Pan American Softball Stadium, Guadalajara |

| October 20, 2011; 13:00 | Canada | 5–12 | United States | Pan American Softball Stadium, Guadalajara |

| October 21, 2011; 11:00 | Canada | 6 – 2 | Dominican Republic | Pan American Softball Stadium, Guadalajara; Attendance: 185 |
| October 21, 2011; 11:00 | | http://200.57.183.69/ENG/SO/SOR173A_SOW40040010100007ENG.htm | | Pan American Softball Stadium, Guadalajara; Attendance: 185 |

Semifinals

| October 22, 2011; 16:00 | Canada | 11 – 1 | Venezuela | Pan American Softball Stadium, Guadalajara; Attendance: 150 |
| October 22, 2011; 16:00 | | http://200.57.183.69/ENG/SO/SOR173A_SOW40040030200002ENG.htm | | Pan American Softball Stadium, Guadalajara; Attendance: 150 |

Gold Medal Match

| October 23, 2011; 12:00 | United States | 11 – 1 | Canada | Pan American Softball Stadium, Guadalajara; Attendance: 555 |
| October 23, 2011; 12:00 | | http://200.57.183.69/ENG/SO/SOR173A_SOW40040050100001ENG.htm | | Pan American Softball Stadium, Guadalajara; Attendance: 555 |

2011 Pan American Games Silver Medal

Canada

== Squash ==
Canada has qualified a full squash team. The team will be made up of six athletes (three men and three women).

Men

| Event | Athlete(s) | First round | Round of 16 | Quarterfinal | Semifinal | Final |
| Event | Athlete(s) | Opposition Result | Opposition Result | Opposition Result | Opposition Result | Opposition Result |
|---|---|---|---|---|---|---|
| Shahier Razik | Singles | | Graham Bassett (USA); W 11-5, 11-5, 11-5 | César Salazar (MEX); L 9-11, 3-11, 4-11 | did not advance | |
| Shawn Delierre | Singles | | Andre L'Heureux (PAR); W 11-0, 11-3, 11-7 | Rafael Fernandes (BRA); W 11-7, 8-11, 11-9, 11-7 | Miguel Ángel Rodríguez (COL); L 7-11, 3-11, 7-11 (bronze) | did not advance |

Team

| Athletes | Event | Preliminaries Group Stage | | | Quarterfinal | Semifinal | Final |
| Athletes | Event | Opposition Result | Opposition Result | Opposition Result | Opposition Result | Opposition Result | Opposition Result |
|---|---|---|---|---|---|---|---|
| Shahier Razik; Shawn Delierre; Andrew Schnell | Team | Chile; W 3-0, 3-0, 3-0 | Guatemala; W 3-0, 3-0, 3-2 | Colombia; W 3-1, 3-0, 3-1 | | United States; W 1-0 RET, 3-2 | Mexico; L 1-3, 3-1, 0-3 (silver) |

Women

| Event | Athlete(s) | First round | Round of 16 | Quarterfinal | Semifinal | Final |
| Event | Athlete(s) | Opposition Result | Opposition Result | Opposition Result | Opposition Result | Opposition Result |
|---|---|---|---|---|---|---|
| Miranda Ranieri | Singles | | Marina Costa (BRA); W 11-8, 11-7, 11-9 | Silvia Angulo (COL); W 11-4, 11-7, 12-10 | Samantha Cornett (CAN); L 9-11, 5-11, 11-5, 8-11 (bronze) | did not advance |
| Samantha Cornett | Singles | | Cecilia Cerquetti (ARG); W 11-5, 11-3, 12-3 | Olivia Blatchford (USA); W 11-7, 11-9, 8-11, 11-6 | Miranda Ranieri (CAN); W 11-9, 11-5, 5-11, 11-8 | Samantha Terán (MEX); L 6-11, 4-11, 6-11 (silver) |
| Miranda Ranieri; Stephanie Edmison | Doubles | | | Mariana Pontalti (BRA); Thaisa Serafini (BRA); W 11 – 5, 11 – 7 | Catalina Peláez (COL); Silvia Angulo (COL); L 7 – 11, 11 – 8, 7 – 11 (bronze) | did not advance |

Team

| Athletes | Event | Preliminaries Group Stage | | | Semifinal | Final |
| Athletes | Event | Opposition Result | Opposition Result | Opposition Result | Opposition Result | Opposition Result |
|---|---|---|---|---|---|---|
| Miranda Ranieri; Stephanie Edmison; Samantha Cornett | Team | Chile; W 3-0, 3-0, 3-0 | Guatemala; W 3-0, 3-1, 3-0 | Colombia; W 3-0, 3-1, 3-2 | Mexico; W 0-3, 3-0, 3-0 | Colombia; W 3-1, 3-1 (gold) |

== Swimming ==
Canada's swim team will be made up of athletes who finish in the two in each event (and meet qualifying standards) at the 2011 Summer National Championships in Pointe-Claire, Quebec. Canada's swimming team is considered a 'B' or a developmental team, because the selection trials were held during the 2011 World Aquatics Championships in Shanghai, China where most of Canada's top swimmers were competing.

Canada's team was announced on August 22, 2011, it will consist of 21 athletes (14 females and 7 males). Majority of the swimmers who won the races they competed in at the selection trials (including former world record holder Amanda Reason) declined to participate.

Men

| Athlete | Event | Heats | | Final | |
| Athlete | Event | Time | Rank | Time | Rank |
|---|---|---|---|---|---|
| Rory Biskupski | 100 m freestyle | 51.12 | 13 qB | 51.15 | 4B |
| Francis Despond | 200 m freestyle | 1:54.70 | 15 qB | 1:53.65 | 4B |
| Francis Despond | 400 m freestyle | 4:01.88 | 10 qB | 4:00.16 | 1B |
| Jacob Armstrong | 100 m breaststroke | 1:04.02 | 12 qB | 1:04.29 | 5B |
| Warren Barnes | 100 m breaststroke | 1:03.31 | 9 qB | 1:03.50 | 1B |
| Warren Barnes | 200 m breaststroke | 2:17.36 | 5 QA | 2:16.87 | 4 |
| Ashton Baumann | 200 m breaststroke | 2:18.59 | 6 QA | 2:19.54 | 7 |
| Lyam Dias | 200 m medley | 2:05.47 | 5 QA | 2:05.06 | 5 |
| Lyam Dias | 400 m medley | 4:37.60 | 8 QA | 4:34.11 | 6 |
| Lyam Dias; Francis Despond; Rory Biskupski; Ashton Baumann | 4 × 100 m Freestyle Relay | 3:32.11 | 6 QA | 3:29.42 | 7 |
| Lyam Dias; Francis Despond; Rory Biskupski; Ashton Baumann; Jacob Armstrong^{*} Warren Barnes^{*} | 4 × 200 m Freestyle Relay | 8:06.09 | 7 QA | 7:50.85 | 6 |
| Lyam Dias; Warren Barnes; Rory Biskupski; Ashton Baumann; Jacob Armstrong^{*} | 4 × 100 m Medley Relay | 3:32.11 | 6 QA | 3:51.61 | 8 |
| Richard Weinberger | 10 km marathon | | | 1:57:31.0 | 1st place, gold medalist(s) |

^{*} Swimmers who participated in the heats only and received medals.

Women

| Athlete | Event | Heats | | Final | |
| Athlete | Event | Time | Rank | Time | Rank |
|---|---|---|---|---|---|
| Jennifer Beckberger | 50 m freestyle | 26.05 | 8 QA | 26.12 | 8 |
| Jennifer Beckberger | 100 m freestyle | 56.15 | 4 QA | 55.68 | 5 |
| Jennifer Beckberger | 200 m freestyle | 2:05.17 | 7 QA | 2:04.72 | 8 |
| Paige Schultz | 200 m freestyle | 2:09.25 | 12 qB | 2:04.95 | 1B |
| Paige Schultz | 200 m medley | 2:23.31 | 9 qB | 2:21.38 | 2B |
| Caroline Lapierre-Lemire | 50 m freestyle | 26.66 | 11 qB | 26.53 | 3B |
| Caroline Lapierre-Lemire | 100 m freestyle | 57.43 | 10 qB | 57.70 | 2B |
| Bridget Coley | 400 m freestyle | 4:23.04 | 10 qB | 4:26.36 | 4B |
| Bridget Coley | 800 m freestyle | 9:06.35 | 10 | did not advance | |
| Sherry Liu | 400 m freestyle | 4:26.80 | 14 qB | 4:18.11 | 1B |
| Sherry Liu | 800 m freestyle | 9:05.88 | 9 | did not advance | |
| Gabrielle Soucisse | 100 m backstroke | 1:03.04 | 6 QA | 1:02.88 | 6 |
| Gabrielle Soucisse | 200 m backstroke | 2:17.27 | 5 QA | 2:16.86 | 6 |
| Kierra Smith | 100 m breaststroke | 1:10.15 | 5 QA | 1:10.23 | 5 |
| Ashley McGregor | 100 m breaststroke | 1:09.24 | 1 QA | 1:08.96 | 3rd place, bronze medalist(s) |
| Ashley McGregor | 200 m breaststroke | 2:29.32 | 1 QA | 2:28.04 | 1st place, gold medalist(s) |
| Hanna Pierse | 200 m breaststroke | 2:31.73 | 3 QA | 2:31.06 | 5 |
| Hanna Pierse | 200 m medley | 2:19.86 | 4 QA | 2:19.12 | 5 |
| Hanna Pierse | 400 m medley | 4:59.76 | 7 QA | 4:52.95 | 4 |
| Samantha Corea | 100 m butterfly | 1:04.14 | 14 qB | 1:02.38 | 1B |
| Samantha Corea | 100 m backsrtoke | 1:05.01 | 12 qB | 1:04.03 | 2B |
| Erin Miller | 100 m butterfly | 1:01.58 | 7 QA | 1:00.49 | 4 |
| Erin Miller | 200 m butterfly | 2:18.37 | 8 QA | 2:16.10 | 5 |
| Brenna MacLean | 200 m butterfly | 2:15.87 | 5 QA | 2:16.13 | 6 |
| Karyn Jewell | 200 m backstroke | 2:23.78 | 10 qB | 2:20.87 | 2B |
| Karyn Jewell | 400 m medley | 4:57.81 | 5 QA | 4:57.65 | 7 |
| Jennifer Beckberger; Caroline Lapierre; Ashley McGregor; Paige Schultz; Gabrielle Soucisse^{*} | 4 × 100 m Freestyle Relay | 3:51.19 | 3 QA | 3:48.37 | 3rd place, bronze medalist(s) |
| Jennifer Beckberger; Caroline Lapierre; Sherry Liu; Paige Schultz; Gabrielle Soucisse^{*} Ashley McGregor^{*} Karyn Jewell^{*} Bridget Coley^{*} | 4 × 200 m Freestyle Relay | 8:33.09 | 4 QA | 8:19.93 | 5 |
| Jennifer Beckberger; Ashley McGregor; Erin Miller; Gabrielle Soucisse; Samantha Corea^{*} Brenna MacLean^{*} Kierra Smith^{*}Caroline Lapierre^{*} | 4 × 100 m Medley Relay | 4:15.73 | 3 QA | 4:07.04 | 2nd place, silver medalist(s) |
| Zsofia Balazs | 10 km marathon | | | 2:06:22.2 | 7 |

^{*} Swimmers who participated in the heats only and received medals.

== Synchronized swimming ==
Canada has qualified a full team (a duet and a team) it will consist of nine athletes.

| Athletes | Event | Technical Routine | | Free Routine (Final) | | | |
| Athletes | Event | Points | Rank 1 | Points | Rank | Total Points | Rank |
|---|---|---|---|---|---|---|---|
| Marie-Pier Boudreau Gagnon; Élise Marcotte | Women's duet | 94.000 | 1 | 94.988 | 1 | 188.988 | 1st place, gold medalist(s) |
| Marie-Pier Boudreau Gagnon; Stéphanie Durocher; Jo-Annie Fortin; Chloé Isaac; Stéphanie Leclair; Tracy Little; Élise Marcotte; Karine Thomas; Valérie Welsh | Women's team | 94.875 | 1 | 95.513 | 1 | 190.388 | 1st place, gold medalist(s) |

== Table tennis ==
Canada has qualified a full team of 3 male and 3 female athletes.

Men
Individual

| Athlete | Event | Round robin | | | Round of 32 | Round of 16 | Quarterfinals | Semifinals | Final |
| Athlete | Event | Match 1 | Match 2 | Match 3 | Round of 32 | Round of 16 | Quarterfinals | Semifinals | Final |
| Athlete | Event | Opposition Result | Opposition Result | Opposition Result | Opposition Result | Opposition Result | Opposition Result | Opposition Result | Opposition Result |
|---|---|---|---|---|---|---|---|---|---|
| Pierre-Luc Hinse | Singles | Josue Donado (ESA); W 4 – 0 | Hugo Hoyama (BRA); L 1 – 4 | Heber Moscoso (GUA); W 4 – 1 | | Marcelo Aguirre (PAR); L 1 – 4 | did not advance | | |
| Pradeeban Peter-Paul | Singles | Guillermo Muñoz (MEX); W 4 – 3 | Alberto Mino (ECU); L 0 – 4 | Timothy Wang (USA); L 3 – 4 | did not advance | | | | |
| Pierre-Luc Thériault | Singles | Jose Miguel Ramirez (GUA); W 4 – 3 | Andres CArlier (CHI); W 4 – 0 | Gaston Alto (ARG); L 3 – 4 | | Alberto Mino (ECU); L 0 – 4 | did not advance | | |

Team

| Event | Athlete(s) | Preliminaries Group Stage | | | Quarterfinal | Semifinal | Final |
| Event | Athlete(s) | Opposition Result | Opposition Result | Opposition Result | Opposition Result | Opposition Result | Opposition Result |
|---|---|---|---|---|---|---|---|
| Pierre-Luc Hinse; Pradeeban Peter-Paul; Pierre-Luc Thériault | Team | Guatemala; W 3 – 1, 3 – 1, 3 – 1 | Mexico; L 0 – 3, 3 – 1, 0 – 3, 0 – 3 | | Cuba; L 2 – 3, 0 – 3, 3 – 2, 2 – 3 | did not advance | |

Women
Individual

| Athlete | Event | Round robin | | | Round of 32 | Round of 16 | Quarterfinals | Semifinals | Final |
| Athlete | Event | Match 1 | Match 2 | Match 3 | Round of 32 | Round of 16 | Quarterfinals | Semifinals | Final |
| Athlete | Event | Opposition Result | Opposition Result | Opposition Result | Opposition Result | Opposition Result | Opposition Result | Opposition Result | Opposition Result |
|---|---|---|---|---|---|---|---|---|---|
| Shirley Fu | Singles | Caroline Kumahara (BRA); L 1 – 4 | Daniely Rios (PUR); W 4 – 1 | Yadira Silva (MEX); L 3 – 4 | did not advance | | | | |
| Anqi Luo | Singles | Mabelyn Enriquez (GUA); W 4 – 2 | Lígia Silva (BRA); W 4 – 3 | Luisa Zuluaga (COL); L 3 – 4 | Andrea Estrada (GUA); W 4 – 3 | Lily Zhang (USA); L 1 – 4 | did not advance | | |
| Zhang Mo | Singles | Maria Soto (PER); W 4 – 1 | Glendys Gonzalez (CUB); W 4 – 0 | Monica Serrano (MEX); W 4 – 0 | | Leisy Jimenez (CUB); W 4 – 1 | Yadira Silva (MEX); W 4 – 1 | Lily Zhang (USA); W 4 – 1 | Xue Wu (DOM); W 4 – 2 (gold) |

Team

| Event | Athlete(s) | Preliminaries Group Stage | | | Quarterfinal | Semifinal | Final |
| Event | Athlete(s) | Opposition Result | Opposition Result | Opposition Result | Opposition Result | Opposition Result | Opposition Result |
|---|---|---|---|---|---|---|---|
| Shirley Fu; Anqi Luo; Zhang Mo | Team | Guatemala; W 3 – 0, 3 – 2, 3 – 1 | Chile; W 3 – 1, 3 – 2, 0 – 3, 3 – 0 | | Dominican Republic; L 3 – 1, 1 – 3, 0 – 3, 3 – 0, 0 – 3 | did not advance | |

== Taekwondo ==
Canada has qualified a full team of eight athletes. The team was selected after selection trials held between July 30 and 31, 2011 in Toronto, Ontario. A notable exclusion is Karine Sergerie (lost her final bout at the qualification tournament) who was a silver medalist at the 2008 Summer Olympics in Beijing, China

Men

| Athlete | Event | Round of 16 | Quarterfinals | Semifinals | Final |
| Athlete | Event | Opposition Result | Opposition Result | Opposition Result | Opposition Result |
|---|---|---|---|---|---|
| Jocelyn Addison | Flyweight (-58kg) | Heiner Oviedo (CRC); W 9 – 3 | G Mercedes (DOM); L 1 – 7 | did not advance | |
| Siddhartha Bhat | Lightweight (-68kg) | Ryan Leach (BAR); W DSQ | Mario Andres Guerra (CHI); L 6 – 7 | did not advance | |
| Sébastien Michaud | Middleweight (-80kg) | | Sebastian Crismanich (ARG); L KO Ronda 2 0:59 | did not advance | |
| François Coulombe-Fortier | Heavyweight(+80kg) | | Kenneth Edwards (JAM); W 15:3 | Robelis Despaigne (CUB); L 3 – 5 (bronze) | did not advance |

Women

| Athlete | Event | Round of 16 | Quarterfinals | Semifinals | Final |
| Athlete | Event | Opposition Result | Opposition Result | Opposition Result | Opposition Result |
|---|---|---|---|---|---|
| Ivett Gonda | Flyweight (-49kg) | Daynelli Montejo (CUB); W DSQ Ronda 1 2:00 | Carolena Carstens (PAN); W 11-4 | Deireanne Morales (USA); W 8-3 | Lizbeth Diez Canseco (PER); W 13-6 (gold) |
| Maude Dufour | Lightweight (-57kg) | Nidia Muyoz (CUB); L 0 – 12 | did not advance | | |
| Melissa Pagnotta | Middleweight (-67kg) | | Raphaella Pereira (BRA); W 5-4 | Katherine Rodriguez Peguero (DOM); W 15-9 | Paige Arielle McPherson (USA); W 7-6 (gold) |
| Jasmine Vokey | Heavyweight(+67kg) | Sandra Julieth Vanegas (COL); L 2 – 5 | did not advance | | |

== Tennis ==
Canada has qualified two tennis players (one male and one female), all two are ranked well below the top ranked athletes in Canada.

Men

| Athlete | Event | 1st round | Round of 32 | Round of 16 | Quarterfinals | Semifinals | Final |
| Athlete | Event | Opposition Score | Opposition Score | Opposition Score | Opposition Score | Opposition Score | Opposition Score |
|---|---|---|---|---|---|---|---|
| Christopher Klingemann | Singles | Roberto Quiroz (ECU); L 3 – 6, 3 – 6 | did not advance | | | | |

Women

| Athlete | Event | 1st round | Round of 16 | Quarterfinals | Semifinals | Final |
| Athlete | Event | Opposition Score | Opposition Score | Opposition Score | Opposition Score | Opposition Score |
|---|---|---|---|---|---|---|
| Gabriela Dabrowski | Singles | Camila Silva (CHI); W 6 – 4, 6 – 0 | Irina Falconi (USA); L 2 – 6, 0 – 6 | did not advance | | |

Mixed doubles

| Athlete | Event | Round of 16 | Quarterfinals | Semifinals | Final |
| Athlete | Event | Opposition Score | Opposition Score | Opposition Score | Opposition Score |
|---|---|---|---|---|---|
| Christopher Klingemann; Gabriela Dabrowski | Doubles | Mailen Auroux (ARG); Facundo Arguello (ARG); L 6 – 7, 3 – 6 | did not advance | | |

== Triathlon ==
Canada had qualified a full triathlon team of six athletes, however only three athletes were announced to the team.

Men

| Athlete | Event | Swim (1.5 km) | Trans 1 | Bike (40 km) | Trans 2 | Run (10 km) | Total | Rank |
|---|---|---|---|---|---|---|---|---|
| Kyle Jones | Individual | 18:21; 9 | 0.23; 6 | 57:20; 16 | 0.14; 5 | 32:10; 3 | 1:48:23 | 3rd place, bronze medalist(s) |
| Brent McMahon | Individual | 18:15; 6 | 0.24 =2 | 57:16; 19 | 0.13; 1 | 32:28; 4 | 1:48:45 | 4 |

Women

| Athlete | Event | Swim (1.5 km) | Trans 1 | Bike (40 km) | Trans 2 | Run (10 km) | Total | Rank |
|---|---|---|---|---|---|---|---|---|
| Kathy Tremblay | Individual | 20:46; 15 | 0.25; 1 | 1:03:07 =8 | 0.15; 4 | 36:38; 3 | 2:01:13 | 5 |

== Volleyball ==
Canada has qualified a men's and's women's teams.

Men

The men's team will consist of eleven athletes.

Roster

- Blair Bann
- Max Burt
- Reid Halpenny
- Jacob Kilpatrick
- Spencer Leiske
- Louis-Pierre Mainville
- Kevin Miller
- Tanner Nault
- Devon Parkinson
- Sander Ratsep
- Tyler Santoni

Group B

| Pos | Team | Pld | W | L | Pts | SPW | SPL | SPR | SW | SL | SR | Qualification |
|---|---|---|---|---|---|---|---|---|---|---|---|---|
| 1 | Brazil | 3 | 3 | 0 | 14 | 243 | 171 | 1.421 | 9 | 1 | 9.000 | Semifinals |
| 2 | Puerto Rico | 3 | 1 | 2 | 7 | 227 | 244 | 0.930 | 5 | 6 | 0.833 | Quarterfinals |
| 3 | United States | 3 | 1 | 2 | 6 | 313 | 324 | 0.966 | 6 | 8 | 0.750 | Quarterfinals |
| 4 | Canada | 3 | 1 | 2 | 3 | 238 | 282 | 0.844 | 3 | 8 | 0.375 | |

| Date | | Score | | Set 1 | Set 2 | Set 3 | Set 4 | Set 5 | Total | Report |
|---|---|---|---|---|---|---|---|---|---|---|
| Oct 24 | Brazil | 3–0 | Canada | 25–17 | 25–13 | 25–13 | | | 75–43 | Report |
| Oct 25 | United States | 2–3 | Canada | 25–21 | 23–25 | 39–37 | 33–35 | 12–15 | 132–133 | Report |
| Oct 26 | Puerto Rico | 3–0 | Canada | 25-22 | 25-17 | 25-23 | | | 75-62 | Report |

Fifth to eighth place classification

| Date | | Score | | Set 1 | Set 2 | Set 3 | Set 4 | Set 5 | Total | Report |
|---|---|---|---|---|---|---|---|---|---|---|
| Oct 28 | Canada | 3–1 | Puerto Rico | 25–20 | 19–25 | 25–19 | 25–20 | | 94–84 | Report |

Fifth place match

| Date | | Score | | Set 1 | Set 2 | Set 3 | Set 4 | Set 5 | Total | Report |
|---|---|---|---|---|---|---|---|---|---|---|
| Oct 29 | United States | 3–2 | Canada | 22–25 | 25–15 | 25–19 | 21–25 | 19–17 | 112–101 | Report |

2011 Pan American Games 6th

Canada

Women

The women's team will consist of twelve athletes.

Team

- Carla Bradstock
- Elizabeth Cordonier
- Jennifer Hinze
- Sherline Tasha Holness
- Colette Johnson
- Tammy Mahon
- Tricia Mayba
- Ciaran McGovern
- Tonya Mokelki
- Lauren O'Reilly
- Brittney Page
- Julie Young

Group A

| Pos | Team | Pld | W | L | Pts | SPW | SPL | SPR | SW | SL | SR | Qualification |
|---|---|---|---|---|---|---|---|---|---|---|---|---|
| 1 | Brazil | 3 | 3 | 0 | 13 | 267 | 212 | 1.259 | 9 | 2 | 4.500 | Semifinals |
| 2 | Cuba | 3 | 2 | 1 | 10 | 259 | 236 | 1.097 | 7 | 4 | 1.750 | Quarterfinals |
| 3 | Dominican Republic | 3 | 1 | 2 | 5 | 283 | 304 | 0.931 | 5 | 8 | 0.625 | Quarterfinals |
| 4 | Canada | 3 | 0 | 3 | 2 | 209 | 266 | 0.786 | 2 | 9 | 0.222 | |

| Date | | Score | | Set 1 | Set 2 | Set 3 | Set 4 | Set 5 | Total | Report |
|---|---|---|---|---|---|---|---|---|---|---|
| Oct 15 | Cuba | 3–0 | Canada | 25–22 | 25–16 | 25–18 | | | 75–56 | Report |
| Oct 16 | Brazil | 3–0 | Canada | 25–19 | 25–12 | 25–10 | | | 75–41 | Report |
| Oct 17 | Dominican Republic | 3–2 | Canada | 27–29 | 22–25 | 27–25 | 25–21 | 15–12 | 116–112 | Report |

Fifth to eighth place classification

| Date | | Score | | Set 1 | Set 2 | Set 3 | Set 4 | Set 5 | Total | Report |
|---|---|---|---|---|---|---|---|---|---|---|
| Oct 19 | Peru | 3–1 | Canada | 26–24 | 18–25 | 25–22 | 25–19 | | 94–90 | Report |

Seventh place match

| Date | | Score | | Set 1 | Set 2 | Set 3 | Set 4 | Set 5 | Total | Report |
|---|---|---|---|---|---|---|---|---|---|---|
| Oct 20 | Canada | 3–1 | Mexico | 19–25 | 25–17 | 26–24 | 25–15 | | 95–81 | Report |

2011 Pan American Games 7th

Canada

== Water polo ==
Canada has qualified a men's and women's water polo team. Each team will be made up of 13 athletes for a total of 26.

Men

Canada has been drawn into a group with Colombia, Cuba and hosts Mexico. Canada are the defending silver medalists from 2007.

Team

- Dusan Aleksic
- Nicholas Bicari
- Justin Boyd
- John Conway
- Dusko Dakic
- Devon Diggle
- Aaron Feltham
- Kevin Graham
- Constantine Kudaba
- Jared McElroy
- Robin Randall
- Scott Robinson
- Oliver Vikalo

Group A

| Team | GP | W | D | L | GF | GA | GD | Pts |
|---|---|---|---|---|---|---|---|---|
| Canada | 3 | 3 | 0 | 0 | 46 | 21 | +25 | 6 |
| Cuba | 3 | 2 | 0 | 1 | 30 | 33 | -3 | 4 |
| Mexico | 3 | 1 | 0 | 2 | 24 | 35 | -11 | 2 |
| Colombia | 3 | 0 | 0 | 3 | 29 | 40 | -11 | 0 |

| October 23, 2011; 18:15 | Report | Canada | 16–4 | Mexico | Scotiabank Aquatics Center, Guadalajara; Referees: Moller (ARG), Wittstock (USA) |
| October 23, 2011; 18:15 | Report | Score by quarters: 0 – 3, 0 – 6, 1 – 3, 3 – 4 | | | Scotiabank Aquatics Center, Guadalajara; Referees: Moller (ARG), Wittstock (USA) |
| October 23, 2011; 18:15 | Report | Graham 4 | Goals | Perez, Garcia 2 | Scotiabank Aquatics Center, Guadalajara; Referees: Moller (ARG), Wittstock (USA) |

| October 24, 2011; 15:46 | Report | Canada | 15–10 | Cuba | Scotiabank Aquatics Center, Guadalajara; Referees: Parades (COL), Stampalija (CRO) |
| October 24, 2011; 15:46 | Report | Score by quarters: 4 – 3, 4 – 4, 3 – 1, 4 – 2 | | | Scotiabank Aquatics Center, Guadalajara; Referees: Parades (COL), Stampalija (CRO) |
| October 24, 2011; 15:46 | Report | Graham, Constantin 4 | Goals | 3 players 2 | Scotiabank Aquatics Center, Guadalajara; Referees: Parades (COL), Stampalija (CRO) |

| October 25, 2011; 15:45 | Report | Canada | 15–7 | Colombia | Scotiabank Aquatics Center, Guadalajara; Referees: Moller (ARG), Maretzki (USA) |
| October 25, 2011; 15:45 | Report | Score by quarters: 4 – 2, 2 – 1, 6 – 1, 3 – 3 | | | Scotiabank Aquatics Center, Guadalajara; Referees: Moller (ARG), Maretzki (USA) |
| October 25, 2011; 15:45 | Report | Constantin 3 | Goals | Bejarano, Montoya 2 | Scotiabank Aquatics Center, Guadalajara; Referees: Moller (ARG), Maretzki (USA) |

Semifinals

| October 27, 2011; 17:00 | Report | Brazil | 6–8 | Canada | Scotiabank Aquatics Center, Guadalajara |
| October 27, 2011; 17:00 | Report | Score by quarters: 4 – 1, 0 – 1, 1 – 3, 1 – 3 | | | Scotiabank Aquatics Center, Guadalajara |
| October 27, 2011; 17:00 | Report | Crivella 2 | Goals | Graham 3 | Scotiabank Aquatics Center, Guadalajara |

Gold medal match

| October 29, 2011; 17:00 | Report | United States | 7–3 | Canada | Scotiabank Aquatics Center, Guadalajara; Referees: Stampalija (CRO), Werner (BRA) |
| October 29, 2011; 17:00 | Report | Score by quarters: 2–1, 2–1, 1–0, 2–1 | | | Scotiabank Aquatics Center, Guadalajara; Referees: Stampalija (CRO), Werner (BRA) |
| October 29, 2011; 17:00 | Report | Azevedo 3 | Goals | Graham 2 | Scotiabank Aquatics Center, Guadalajara; Referees: Stampalija (CRO), Werner (BRA) |

2011 Pan American Games Silver Medal

Canada

Women

Canada has been drawn into a group with Brazil, Mexico and hosts Venezuela. Canada are the defending silver medalists from 2007.

Team

- Krystina Alogbo
- Joëlle Békhazi
- Tara Campbell
- Emily Csikos
- Monika Eggens
- Whitney Genoway
- Katrina Monton
- Dominique Perreault
- Marina Radu
- Rachel Riddell
- Christine Robinson
- Rosanna Tomiuk
- Anna Yelizarova

Group A

| Team | GP | W | D | L | GF | GA | GD | Pts |
|---|---|---|---|---|---|---|---|---|
| Canada | 3 | 3 | 0 | 0 | 54 | 15 | +39 | 6 |
| Brazil | 3 | 2 | 0 | 1 | 22 | 21 | +1 | 4 |
| Mexico | 3 | 1 | 0 | 2 | 31 | 33 | -2 | 2 |
| Venezuela | 3 | 0 | 0 | 3 | 12 | 50 | -38 | 0 |

| October 23, 2011; 12:15 | Report | Venezuela | 2–23 | Canada | Scotiabank Aquatics Center, Guadalajara; Referees: Madera (CUB), Lopez (COL) |
| October 23, 2011; 12:15 | Report | Score by quarters: 1 – 5, 0 – 6, 1 – 6, 0 – 6 | | | Scotiabank Aquatics Center, Guadalajara; Referees: Madera (CUB), Lopez (COL) |
| October 23, 2011; 12:15 | Report | Alas, Galue, 1 | Goals | Alogbo, 5 | Scotiabank Aquatics Center, Guadalajara; Referees: Madera (CUB), Lopez (COL) |

| October 24, 2011; 9:45 | Report | Brazil | 4–13 | Canada | Scotiabank Aquatics Center, Guadalajara; Referees: Madera (CUB) Arnoldo (VEN) |
| October 24, 2011; 9:45 | Report | Score by quarters: 0 – 2, 1 – 3, 0 – 5, 3 – 3 | | | Scotiabank Aquatics Center, Guadalajara; Referees: Madera (CUB) Arnoldo (VEN) |
| October 24, 2011; 9:45 | Report | 4 players, 1 | Goals | 3 players, 2 | Scotiabank Aquatics Center, Guadalajara; Referees: Madera (CUB) Arnoldo (VEN) |

| October 25, 2011; 11:00 | Report | Mexico | 9–18 | Canada | Scotiabank Aquatics Center, Guadalajara; Referees: Redding (USA) Valcarce (ARG) |
| October 25, 2011; 11:00 | Report | Score by quarters: 2 – 6, 3 – 6, 3 – 4, 1 – 2 | | | Scotiabank Aquatics Center, Guadalajara; Referees: Redding (USA) Valcarce (ARG) |
| October 25, 2011; 11:00 | Report | Carrillo 2 | Goals | Alogbo, 6 | Scotiabank Aquatics Center, Guadalajara; Referees: Redding (USA) Valcarce (ARG) |

Semifinals

| October 26, 2011; 17:00 | Report | Cuba | 9–15 | Canada | Scotiabank Aquatics Center, Guadalajara; Referees: Valcarce (ARG), Bohm (AHO) |
| October 26, 2011; 17:00 | Report | Score by quarters: 2 – 4, 1 – 4, 3 – 2, 3 – 5 | | | Scotiabank Aquatics Center, Guadalajara; Referees: Valcarce (ARG), Bohm (AHO) |
| October 26, 2011; 17:00 | Report | Hernandez 6 | Goals | Radu 4 | Scotiabank Aquatics Center, Guadalajara; Referees: Valcarce (ARG), Bohm (AHO) |

Gold medal match

| October 28, 2011; 17:00 | Archived 2011-11-02 at the Wayback Machine | United States | 27–26 (OT) | Canada | Scotiabank Aquatics Center, Guadalajara; Referees: Stampalija (CRO), Menendez (CUB) |
| October 28, 2011; 17:00 | Archived 2011-11-02 at the Wayback Machine | Score by quarters: 1 – 1, 1 – 4, 2 – 2, 4 – 1 OT: 0 – 0, PSO: 19 – 18 | | | Scotiabank Aquatics Center, Guadalajara; Referees: Stampalija (CRO), Menendez (CUB) |
| October 28, 2011; 17:00 | Archived 2011-11-02 at the Wayback Machine | Mathewson 4 | Goals | Csikos 5 | Scotiabank Aquatics Center, Guadalajara; Referees: Stampalija (CRO), Menendez (CUB) |

2011 Pan American Games Silver Medal

Canada

== Water skiing ==
Canada has qualified a full team of 5 athletes (men, women and wakeboard). The team was officially announced on October 4.

Men

| Athlete | Event | Semifinals | | Final | |
| Athlete | Event | Score | Rank | Score | Rank |
|---|---|---|---|---|---|
| Kole Magnowski | Overall | | | 1733.6 | 8 |
| Kole Magnowski | Tricks | DNS | | did not advance | |
| Kole Magnowski | Slalom | 30.50 | 12 | did not advance | |
| Kole Magnowski | Jump | 62.10 | 2 Q | 62.50 | 4 |
| Jason McClintock | Tricks | 5310 | 8 Q | 9880 | 2nd place, silver medalist(s) |
| Jason McClintock | Slalom | 38.50 | 3 Q | 40.50 | 2nd place, silver medalist(s) |
| Aaron Rathy | Wakeboard | 85.00 | 1 Q | DSQ | - |

Women

| Athlete | Event | Semifinals | | Final | |
| Athlete | Event | Score | Rank | Score | Rank |
|---|---|---|---|---|---|
| Whitney McClintock | Overall | | | 2809.6 | 2nd place, silver medalist(s) |
| Whitney McClintock | Tricks | 8350 | 1 Q | 8390 | 1st place, gold medalist(s) |
| Whitney McClintock | Slalom | 39.00 | 2 Q | 38.50 | 2nd place, silver medalist(s) |
| Whitney McClintock | Jump | 46.90 | 2 Q | 50.50 | 2nd place, silver medalist(s) |
| Karen Stevens | Overall | | | 1862.8 | 3rd place, bronze medalist(s) |
| Karen Stevens | Tricks | 2470 | 8 | did not advance | |
| Karen Stevens | Slalom | 33.00 | 3 Q | 31.50 | 3rd place, bronze medalist(s) |
| Karen Stevens | Jump | 40.10 | 4 Q | 41.10 | 3rd place, bronze medalist(s) |

== Weightlifting ==
Canada has qualified a team of two male and one female athlete. The team was announced on October 4.

Men

| Athlete | Event | Snatch | | | Clean & Jerk | | | Total | Rank |
| Athlete | Event | Attempt 1 | Attempt 2 | Attempt 3 | Attempt 1 | Attempt 2 | Attempt 3 | Total | Rank |
|---|---|---|---|---|---|---|---|---|---|
| Mathieu Marineau | 85 kg | 135 | 140 | 143 | 170 | 175 | 180 | 323 | 5 |
| George Kobaladze | +105 kg | 160 | 170 | ~~173~~ | 215 | 220 | 223 | 393 | 3rd place, bronze medalist(s) |

Women

| Athlete | Event | Snatch | | | Clean & Jerk | | | Total | Rank |
| Athlete | Event | Attempt 1 | Attempt 2 | Attempt 3 | Attempt 1 | Attempt 2 | Attempt 3 | Total | Rank |
|---|---|---|---|---|---|---|---|---|---|
| Christine Girard | 63 kg | 101 | 104 | 106 RP | 125 | 129 | 132 RP | 238 RP | 1st place, gold medalist(s) |

== Wrestling ==
Canada has qualified full female team of four athletes and a full men's freestyle team of seven athletes, as well as three male Greco-Roman wrestlers. Canada's team will include five defending medalists including defending gold medalist and Olympic Champion, Carol Huynh.

Men's Freestyle

| Athlete | Event | Quarterfinals | Semifinals | Final |
| Athlete | Event | Opposition Result | Opposition Result | Opposition Result |
|---|---|---|---|---|
| Steven Takahashi | −55 kg | Andre Renato Quispe (CHI); W PP 3 – 1 | Obenson Blanc (USA); L PO 0 – 3 | Bronze medal match: BYE (bronze) |
| Ryley Walker | −60 kg | Yowlys Bonne (CUB); L PP 1 – 3 | did not advance | |
| Ryan Daniel Lue | −66 kg | Teyon Vincent Ware (USA); L PP 1 – 3 | did not advance | |
| Matt Gentry | −74 kg | Pool Edinson Ambrocio (PER); W PO 3 – 0 | Yunierki Blanco (CUB); L PO 0 – 3 | Bronze medal match: Eduardo Valencia (MEX); W PP 3 – 1 (bronze) |
| Jeff Adamson | −84 kg | Humberto Daniel Arencibia (CUB); L PP 1 – 3 | | Bronze medal match: Adrian Antoine Jaoude (BRA); W ST 4 – 0 (bronze) |
| Khetag Pliev | −96 kg | Michel Antonio Batista (CUB); W PP 3 – 1 | Jacob Varner (USA); L ST 0 – 4 | Bronze medal match: Israel Enrique Silva (MEX); W PP 3 – 1 (bronze) |
| Sunny Dhinsa | −120 kg | Edgardo Lopez (PUR); W ST 4 – 0 | Carlos Jose Feliz Garcia (DOM); W VT 5 – 0 | Tervel Ivaylov Dlagnev (USA); L PO 0 – 3 (silver) |

Greco-Roman

| Athlete | Event | Quarterfinals | Semifinals | Final |
| Athlete | Event | Opposition Result | Opposition Result | Opposition Result |
|---|---|---|---|---|
| Shawn Daye-Finley | −66 kg | Pedro Isaac Mullens (CUB); L PO 0 – 3 | Semifinal Repechage: Vicente Orlando Huacon (ECU); L VB 0 – 5 | did not advance |
| Eric Feunekes | 84 kg | Yorgen Cova (VEN); L PO 0 – 3 | did not advance | |
| Korey Jarvis | −96 kg | Yuri Alexei Mayer (ARG); L PP 1 – 3 | did not advance | |

Women's Freestyle

| Athlete | Event | Quarterfinals | Semifinals | Final |
| Athlete | Event | Opposition Result | Opposition Result | Opposition Result |
|---|---|---|---|---|
| Carol Huynh | −48 kg | Patricia Bermúdez (ARG); W PP 3 – 1 | Luisa Elizabeth Valverde (ECU); W PO 3 – 0 | Clarissa Kyoko Chun (USA); W VT 5 – 0 (gold) |
| Tonya Verbeek | −55 kg | Jenny Vanessa Malqui (PER); W PO 3 – 0 | Lissette Alexandra Antes (ECU); W PO 3 – 0 | Helen Louise Maroulis (USA); L PP 1 – 3 (silver) |
| Justine Bouchard | −63 kg | Luz Clara Vazquez (ARG); L PO 0 – 3 | did not advance | |
