= Cycling at the 2011 Pan American Games – Women's cross-country =

Women's cross-country at the 2011 Pan American Games
- Venue: Pan American Mountain Bike Circuit
- Date: 15 October 2011
- Competitors: 13 from 11 nations

Medalists
Gold medal	Heather Irmiger	United States
Silver medal	Laura Morfin	Mexico
Bronze medal	Amanda Sin	Canada

The women's cross-country competition of the cycling events at the 2011 Pan American Games was held on 15 October 2011 at the Pan American Mountain Bike Circuit in Tapalpa. The defending Pan American Games champion is Catharine Pendrel of the Canada, while the defending Pan American Championship, champion is Angela Carolina Parra Sierra of Colombia. The race became the first event completed at the 2011 Pan American Games.

Heather Irmiger of the United States won the gold medal, thus becoming the first champion at these games.

== Schedule ==
All times are Central Standard Time (UTC-6).

Date	Time	Round
15 October 2011	9:00	Final

== Results ==
13 competitors from 11 countries were scheduled to compete.

Rank	Rider	Time
1st place, gold medalist(s)	Heather Irmiger (USA)	1:34:09
2nd place, silver medalist(s)	Laura Morfin (MEX)	1:35:54
3rd place, bronze medalist(s)	Amanda Sin (CAN)	1:37:14
4	Mikaela Kofman (CAN)	1:38:08
5	Noelia Rodriguez (ARG)	1:40:27
6	Adriana Rojas Cubero (CRC)	1:40:55
7	Elisa Garcia (CHI)	1:41:13
8	Alexandra Serrano (ECU)	1:41:26
9	Daniela Campuzano (MEX)	1:43:39
10	Liliana Uzcategui (VEN)	1:44:04
11	Laura Abril (COL)	1:44:55
12	Erika Gramiscelli (BRA)	1:50:43
	Jennifer Portillo (ESA)	DNF
