= Water skiing at the 2011 Pan American Games – Men's slalom =

Men's slalom at the 2011 Pan American Games
- Venue: Boca Laguna Water Ski Track
- Dates: October 21 – October 23
- Competitors: 17 from 8 nations

The men's slalom competition of the Water skiing events at the 2011 Pan American Games in Guadalajara were held from October 21 to October 23 at the Boca Laguna Water Ski Track. The defending champion was Drew Ross of Canada.

== Schedule ==
All times are Central Standard time (UTC-6).

Date	Start	Phase
Friday, October 21	9:00	Semifinals
Sunday, October 23	9:00	Finals

== Results ==
=== Preliminaries ===
The top eight qualify for the final.

Rank	Name	Nationality	Score	Notes
1	Felipe Miranda	Chile	39.00	q
2	Carlos Lamadrid	Mexico	38.50	q
2	Jason McClintock	Canada	38.50	q
4	Jonathan Travers	United States	37.50	q
5	Javier Julio	Argentina	36.00	q
6	Felipe Neves	Brazil	34.50	q
7	Alvaro Lamadrid	Mexico	34.00	q
7	Rodrigo Miranda	Chile	34.00	q
9	Jose Fernando Mesa	Colombia	33.50	
10	Alejandro Lamadrid	Mexico	33.00	
11	Fernando Neves	Brazil	32.50	
12	Thomas Magnowski	Canada	30.50	
13	Jorge Renosto	Argentina	27.50	
14	Martin Malarczuk	Argentina	25.50	
15	Mario Mustafa	Peru	23.00	
16	Esteban Siegert	Colombia	18.50	
	Alejandro Robledo	Colombia	0	DNS
