= Water skiing at the 2011 Pan American Games – Women's jump =

Women's jump at the 2011 Pan American Games
- Venue: Boca Laguna Water Ski Track
- Dates: October 21 – October 23
- Competitors: 7 from 6 nations

The women's jump competition of the Water skiing events at the 2011 Pan American Games in Guadalajara were held from October 21 to October 23 at the Boca Laguna Water Ski Track. The defending champion was Regina Jaquess of the United States.

== Schedule ==
All times are Central Standard time (UTC-6).

Date	Start	Phase
Friday, October 21	9:00	Semifinals
Sunday, October 23	9:00	Finals

== Results ==
=== Preliminaries ===
The top six qualify for the final.

Rank	Name	Nationality	Score	Notes
1	Regina Jaquess	United States	47.70	q
2	Whitney McClintock	Canada	46.90	q
3	Maria Cuglievan	Peru	41.30	q
4	Karen Stevens	Canada	40.10	q
5	Tiare Miranda	Chile	35.90	q
6	Sandra Chapoy	Mexico	34.40	q
	Maria Linares	Colombia	0	DNS
