= Jacques Cardyn =

Canadian fencer (born 1956)

Personal information
- Born: 4 May 1956 (age 70) Chile Chico, Chile

Sport
- Sport: Fencing

Jacques Cardyn (born 4 May 1956) is a Canadian fencer. He competed in the team épée event at the 1984 Summer Olympics.

In 2011 Cardyn was the Chef de Mission of the Canadian team at the 2011 Pan American Games in Guadalajara, Mexico.
