= Cycling at the 2011 Pan American Games – Women's road time trial =

Women's road time trial at the 2011 Pan American Games
- Venue: Guadalajara Circuit
- Dates: October 16
- Competitors: 15 from 11 nations

Medalists
Gold medal	María Luisa Calle	Colombia
Silver medal	Evelyn García	El Salvador
Bronze medal	Laura Brown	Canada

The women's road time trial competition of the cycling events at the 2011 Pan American Games was held on October 16 at the Guadalajara Circuit in Guadalajara. The defending Pan American Games champion is Anne Samplonius of Canada.

== Schedule ==
All times are Central Standard Time (UTC−6).

Date	Time	Round
October 16, 2011	9:00	Final

== Results ==
15 competitors from 11 countries are scheduled to compete.

Rank	Rider	Time
1st place, gold medalist(s)	María Luisa Calle (COL)	28:04.82
2nd place, silver medalist(s)	Evelyn García (ESA)	28:13.76
3rd place, bronze medalist(s)	Laura Brown (CAN)	28:24.00
4	Robin Farina (USA)	28:25.23
5	Alison Starnes (USA)	28:26.47
6	Verónica Leal (MEX)	28:34.29
7	Denise Ramsden (CAN)	28:38.08
8	Adriana Tovar (COL)	28:49.69
9	Danielys García (VEN)	28:54.94
10	Valeria Müller (ARG)	29:31.13
11	Dalila Rodríguez (CUB)	29:32.26
12	Francisca Navarro (CHI)	30:05.94
13	Natalia Navarro (CRC)	30:15.33
14	Tamiko Butler (ATG)	31:39.73
15	Yudelmis Domínguez (CUB)	DNF
