= Cuba at the 2011 Pan American Games =

- IOC code: CUB
- NOC: Cuban Olympic Committee

in Guadalajara 14–30 October 2011
- Competitors: 446 in 31 sports
- Flag bearer: Mijaín López
- Medals Ranked 2nd: Gold 58 Silver 35 Bronze 43 Total 136

Pan American Games appearances (overview)
- 1951; 1955; 1959; 1963; 1967; 1971; 1975; 1979; 1983; 1987; 1991; 1995; 1999; 2003; 2007; 2011; 2015; 2019; 2023; 2027

Cuba competed at the 2011 Pan American Games in Guadalajara, Mexico from October 14 to 30, 2011. Jorge Marrero Gonzalez was the Chef de mission.

== Medalists ==
Medals by sport
Sport	1st place, gold medalist(s)	2nd place, silver medalist(s)	3rd place, bronze medalist(s)	Total
Athletics	18	6	9	33
Wrestling	9	2	3	14
Boxing	8	1	0	9
Judo	6	3	3	12
Canoeing	4	3	2	9
Weightlifting	4	0	0	4
Rowing	3	4	2	9
Cycling	2	2	3	7
Taekwondo	2	1	2	5
Shooting	1	4	1	6
Basque pelota	1	3	4	8
Volleyball	0	2	0	2
Diving	0	1	2	3
Karate	0	1	2	3
Swimming	0	1	1	2
Badminton	0	1	0	1
Fencing	0	0	3	3
Archery	0	0	2	2
Baseball	0	0	1	1
Gymnastics	0	0	1	1
Softball	0	0	1	1
Table tennis	0	0	1	1
Total	58	35	43	136

Medal	Name	Sport	Event	Date
Gold	Yariulvis Cobas; Aimee Hernandez	Rowing	Women's Double Sculls	October 17
Gold	Lisandra Guerra	Cycling	Women's track sprint	October 18
Gold	Glenhis Hernández	Taekwondo	Women's +67 kg	October 18
Gold	Robelis Despaigne	Taekwondo	Men's +80 kg	October 18
Gold	Ángel Fournier	Rowing	Men's single sculls	October 19
Gold	Wilber Turro; Liosbel Hernandez; Liosmel Ramos; Manuel Suárez	Rowing	Men's lightweight coxless four	October 19
Gold	Gustavo Balart	Wrestling	Men's Greco-Roman 55 kg	October 20
Gold	Pedro Mulens	Wrestling	Men's Greco-Roman 66 kg	October 20
Gold	Pablo Shorey	Wrestling	Men's Greco-Roman 84 kg	October 20
Gold	Mijaín López	Wrestling	Men's Greco-Roman 120 kg	October 20
Gold	Jorgisbell Alvarez	Wrestling	Men's Greco-Roman 74 kg	October 21
Gold	Yunior Estrada	Wrestling	Men's Greco-Roman 96 kg	October 21
Gold	Arlenis Sierra	Cycling	Women's road race	October 22
Gold	Dianelys Pérez	Shooting	Women's 50 metre rifle three positions	October 22
Gold	Katerina Vidiaux	Wrestling	Women's freestyle 63 kg	October 22
Gold	Lisset Hechevarria	Wrestling	Women's freestyle 72 kg	October 22
Gold	Sergio Alvarez	Weightlifting	Men's 56 kg	October 23
Gold	Liván López	Wrestling	Wrestling at the 2011 Pan American Games – Men's freestyle 66 kg	October 23
Gold	Jorge Fernández	Athletics	Men's discus throw	October 24
Gold	Yipsi Moreno	Athletics	Women's hammer throw	October 24
Gold	Yarisley Silva	Athletics	Women's pole vault	October 24
Gold	Adriana Muñoz	Athletics	Women's 800 metres	October 25
Gold	Leonel Suárez	Athletics	Men's decathlon	October 25
Gold	Iván Cambar	Weightlifting	Men's 77 kg	October 25
Gold	Yoelmis Hernández	Weightlifting	Men's 85 kg	October 25
Gold	Lesyani Mayor	Athletics	Women's high jump	October 26
Gold	Rafael Fernández; Azuan Perez	Basque pelota	Men's Paleta Leather Pairs 36m	October 26
Gold	Idalys Ortiz	Judo	Women's +78 kg	October 26
Gold	Oscar Brayson	Judo	Men's +100 kg	October 26
Gold	Javier Vanega	Weightlifting	Men's 94 kg	October 26
Gold	Roberto Skyers	Athletics	Men's 200 metres	October 27
Gold	Adriana Muñoz	Athletics	Women's 1,500 metres	October 27
Gold	Omar Cisneros	Athletics	Men's 400 metres hurdles	October 27
Gold	Misleydis González	Athletics	Women's shot put	October 27
Gold	Alexis Copello	Athletics	Men's triple jump	October 27
Gold	Team Cuba	Canoeing	Men's K-4 1,000 metres	October 27
Gold	Onix Cortes	Judo	Women's 70 kg	October 27
Gold	Andy González	Athletics	Men's 800 metres	October 28
Gold	Dayron Robles	Athletics	Men's 110 metres hurdles	October 28
Gold	Yarelys Barrios	Athletics	Women's discus throw	October 28
Gold	Guillermo Martínez	Athletics	Men's javelin throw	October 28
Gold	Lázaro Borges	Athletics	Men's pole vault	October 28
Gold	Noel Ruíz; Yoandri Betanzos; Omar Cisneros; William Collazo	Athletics	Men's 4 × 400 metres relay	October 28
Gold	Aymée Martínez; Diosmely Peña; Susana Clement; Daisurami Bonne	Athletics	Women's 4 × 400 metres relay	October 28
Gold	Lazaro Alvarez	Boxing	Men's Bantamweight 56 kg	October 28
Gold	Roniel Iglesias	Boxing	Men's Light welterweight 64 kg	October 28
Gold	Emilio Correa	Boxing	Men's Middleweight 75 kg	October 28
Gold	Lenier Pero	Boxing	Men's Heavyweight 91 kg	October 28
Gold	Jorge Antonio Garcia	Canoeing	Men's K-1 1,000 metres	October 28
Gold	Karel Aguilar Chacon; Serguey Torres	Canoeing	Men's C-2 1,000 metres	October 28
Gold	Yurisleidys Lupetey	Judo	Women's 57 kg	October 28
Gold	Yaritza Abel	Judo	Women's 63 kg	October 28
Gold	Robeisy Ramírez	Boxing	Men's Flyweight 52 kg	October 29
Gold	Yasniel Toledo	Boxing	Men's Lightweight 60 kg	October 29
Gold	Carlos Banteurt	Boxing	Men's Welterweight 69 kg	October 29
Gold	Julio la Cruz	Boxing	Men's Light heavyweight 81 kg	October 29
Gold	Dayexi Gandalera; Yulitza Meneses	Canoeing	Women's K-2 500 metres	October 29
Gold	Yanet Bermoy	Judo	Women's 52 kg	October 29
Silver	Hanser García	Swimming	Men's 100m Freestyle	October 16
Silver	Angel Mora	Taekwondo	Men's 68kg	October 16
Silver	Janier Concepción; Yoennis Hernández	Rowing	Men's Double Sculls	October 17
Silver	Eglys de la Cruz	Shooting	Women's 10 metre air rifle	October 17
Silver	Yumari González; Dalila Rodriguez; Yudelmis Domínguez	Cycling	Women's team pursuit	October 18
Silver	Janier Concepción; Adrian Oquendo; Eduardo Eubio; Yoennis Hernández	Rowing	Men's quadruple sculls	October 18
Silver	Yunior Perez; Eyder Batista	Rowing	Men's lightweight double sculls	October 18
Silver	Yaima Velazquez; Yoslaine Dominguez	Rowing	Women's lightweight double sculls	October 18
Silver	Osleni Guerrero	Badminton	Men's singles	October 20
Silver	Emily Borrell; Kenia Carcaces; Liannes Castañeda; Ana Yilian Cleger; Rosanna Giel; Daymara Lescay; Yoana Palacios; Alena Rojas; Wilma Salas; Yanelis Santos; Yusidey Silié; Gyselle Silva	Volleyball	Women	October 20
Silver	Yumari González	Cycling	Women's road race	October 22
Silver	Juan Perez	Shooting	Men's 25 metre rapid fire pistol	October 22
Silver	Eglys de la Cruz	Shooting	Women's 50 metre rifle three positions	October 22
Silver	Guillermo Torres	Shooting	Men's skeet	October 22
Silver	Humberto Arencibia	Wrestling	Men's freestyle 84 kg	October 23
Silver	Yunierki Blanco	Wrestling	Men's freestyle 74 kg	October 24
Silver	Carlos Veliz	Athletics	Men's shot put	October 25
Silver	Daisurami Bonne	Athletics	Women's 400 metres	October 26
Silver	Yasmiany Pedroso	Athletics	Women's heptathlon	October 26
Silver	Oreydi Despaigne	Judo	Men's 100 kg	October 26
Silver	Yainelis Ribeaux	Athletics	Women's javelin throw	October 27
Silver	Yoandris Betanzos	Athletics	Men's triple jump	October 27
Silver	Darien Povea	Basque pelota	Men's Mano Singles Trinkete	October 27
Silver	Daniel Alonso; Cesar Rafael Arocha	Basque pelota	Men's Frontenis Pairs 30m	October 27
Silver	Lisandra Lima; Yasmary De La Caridad Medina	Basque pelota	Women's Frontenis Pairs 30m	October 27
Silver	Asley Gonzalez	Judo	Men's 90 kg	October 27
Silver	Yargeris Savigne	Athletics	Women's triple jump	October 28
Silver	Yosbany Veitia	Boxing	Men's Light flyweight 49 kg	October 28
Silver	Reinier Torres; Jorge Antonio Garcia	Canoeing	Men's K-2 1,000 metres	October 28
Silver	Reydel Ramos	Canoeing	Men's C-1 1,000 metres	October 28
Silver	Jeinkler Aguerro; José Guerra	Diving	Men's synchronized 10 metre platform	October 28
Silver	Darisleydis Amador	Canoeing	Women's K-1 200 metres	October 29
Silver	Dayaris Mestre	Judo	Women's 48 kg	October 29
Silver	Dennis Novo	Karate	Men's 67 kg	October 29
Silver	Cuba men's national volleyball team	Volleyball	Men	October 29
Bronze	Frank Diaz	Taekwondo	Men's 58kg	October 15
Bronze	Maydelis Delgado; Zenia Fernandez; Lianet Jose; Martha Perez; Yeney Renovales; Legna Savon	Gymnastics	Women's Rhythmic Group All-Around	October 16
Bronze	Jorge Campos (table tennis); Andy Pereira; Pavel Oxamendi	Table Tennis	Men's Team	October 16
Bronze	Yenser Basilo; Dionnis Carrion; Jorber Avila; Solaris Freire	Rowing	Men's Coxless Four	October 17
Bronze	Taimi Castellanos	Taekwondo	Women's 67 kg	October 17
Bronze	Yaima Velazquez	Rowing	Women's lightweight single sculls	October 19
Bronze	Marlies Mejias	Cycling	Women's Omnium	October 20
Bronze	Hanser García	Swimming	Men's 50 metre freestyle	October 20
Bronze	Juan Stevens; Hugo Franco; Jaime Quintana	Archery	Men's team	October 21
Bronze	Maydenia Sarduy; Orquidea Quesada; Larissa Paga	Archery	Women's team	October 21
Bronze	Hanser Meoque	Wrestling	Men's Greco-Roman 60 kg	October 21
Bronze	Arnold Alcolea	Cycling	Men's road race	October 22
Bronze	Yudelmis Domínguez	Cycling	Women's road race	October 22
Bronze	Juan Rodriguez	Shooting	Men's skeet	October 22
Bronze	Ludisleydis Nápoles; Marlen Bubaire; Lidibet Castellon; Anisley Lopez; Katia Coello; Maylin Sanchez; Yusmelis Ocaña; Yaleisa Soto; Yanitza Avilés; Aleanna de Armas; Maritza Toledo; Yamisleidys Casanova; Yuselys Acosta; Diamela Puentes; Yusmeri Pacheco; Yarisleidy Rosario; Leanneyi Gomez	Softball	Women	October 23
Bronze	Disney Rodríguez	Wrestling	Men's freestyle 120 kg	October 23
Bronze	Reynier Henriquez	Fencing	Men's individual épée	October 24
Bronze	Yowlys Bonne	Wrestling	Men's freestyle 60 kg	October 24
Bronze	Yordani Garcia	Athletics	Men's decathlon	October 25
Bronze	Cuba	Baseball	Men	October 25
Bronze	Yaritza Goulet	Fencing	Women's individual sabre	October 25
Bronze	Noleysis Vicet	Athletics	Men's hammer throw	October 26
Bronze	Frendy Fernandez; Anderson Jardines	Basque pelota	Men's Paleta Leather Pairs Trinkete	October 26
Bronze	Henrry Despaigne	Basque pelota	Men's Mano singles 36m	October 26
Bronze	Jose Noel Fiffe; Jhoan Luis Torreblanca	Basque pelota	Men's Paleta Rubber Pairs 30m	October 26
Bronze	Darisleydis Amador; Yulitza Meneses; Dayexi Gandarela; Yusmary Mengana	Canoeing	Women's K-4 500 metres	October 26
Bronze	Rene Hernandez; Jorge Pupo	Diving	Men's synchronized 3 metre springboard	October 26
Bronze	Yamirka Rodriguez	Fencing	Women's individual épée	October 26
Bronze	Yanet Cruz	Athletics	Women's javelin throw	October 27
Bronze	Víctor Moya	Athletics	Men's high jump	October 27
Bronze	Dariel Leiva; Ruben Moya	Basque pelota	Men's Mano Doubles 36m	October 27
Bronze	Yaima Mena; Annia Rivera	Diving	Women's synchronized 10 metre platform	October 27
Bronze	Yalennis Castillo	Judo	Women's 78 kg	October 27
Bronze	Raidel Acea	Athletics	Men's 800 metres	October 28
Bronze	Orlando Ortega	Athletics	Men's 110 metres hurdles	October 28
Bronze	José Sánchez	Athletics	Men's 3,000 metres steeplechase	October 28
Bronze	Dénia Cabarello	Athletics	Women's discus throw	October 28
Bronze	Mabel Gay	Athletics	Women's triple jump	October 28
Bronze	Anyelo Gomez	Judo	Men's 66 kg	October 28
Bronze	Ronald Girones	Judo	Men's 73 kg	October 28
Bronze	Yoandra Moreno	Karate	Women's 68 kg	October 28
Bronze	Roleysi Baez	Canoeing	Men's C-1 200 metres	October 29
Bronze	Lester Zamora	Karate	Men's 75 kg	October 29

== Archery ==
Cuba has qualified three male and three female athletes in the archery competition.

Men

Athlete	Event	Ranking Round		Round of 32	Round of 16	Quarterfinals	Semifinals	Final	Rank
Athlete	Event	Score	Seed	Opposition Score	Opposition Score	Opposition Score	Opposition Score	Opposition Score	Rank
Juan Stevens	Men's individual	1323	6	G Riccio (ARG); W 6–0	L Valez (MEX); W 6–2	D Pineda (COL); L 2–6	did not advance		5
Hugo Franco	Men's individual	1284	14	N Cintron (PUR); W 6–2	D Pineda (COL); L 1–7	did not advance			9
Jaime Quintana	Men's individual	1261	18	M Veliz (ESA); W 7–1	C Duenas (CAN); L 0–6	did not advance			9
Juan Stevens; Hugo Franco; Jaime Quintana	Men's team	3868	4		BYE	Brazil; W 218–211	United States; L 215–227	Canada; W 217–204	3rd place, bronze medalist(s)

Women

Athlete	Event	Ranking Round		Round of 32	Round of 16	Quarterfinals	Semifinals	Final	Rank
Athlete	Event	Score	Seed	Opposition Score	Opposition Score	Opposition Score	Opposition Score	Opposition Score	Rank
Maydenia Sarduy	Women's individual	1266	12	M Cardoza (PUR); L 4–6	did not advance				17
Larissa Pagan	Women's individual	1251	16	L Solano (DOM); W 6–5	A Valencia (MEX); L 1–7	did not advance			9
Orquidea Quesada	Women's individual	1233	20	P Ramirez (COL); L 4–6	did not advance				17
Maydenia Sarduy; Orquidea Quesada; Larissa Pagan	Women's team	3750	5		BYE	Canada; W 199–197	Mexico; L 197–215	Venezuela; W 201–198	3rd place, bronze medalist(s)

== Athletics ==
=== Track and road events ===
Event	Athletes	Heats		Semifinal		Final	
Event	Athletes	Time	Rank	Time	Rank	Time	Rank
100 m	David Lescay	10.36	2nd Q	10.31	4th Q	10.39	8th
100 m	Michael Herrera	10.31	1st Q	10.52	7th	did not advance	
200 m	Michael Herrera	20.82	3rd Q	20.66	3rd Q	did not advance	
200 m	Roberto Skyers	20.86	2nd Q	20.31 SB	1st Q	20.37	1st place, gold medalist(s)
400 m	William Collazo			45.70	1st Q	45.33	4th
400 m	Noel Ruíz			45.98	2nd Q	45.69	5th
800 m	Raidel Acea			1:50.04	3rd Q	1:46.23	3rd place, bronze medalist(s)
800 m	Andy González			1:48.21	1st Q	1:45.58 SB	1st place, gold medalist(s)
110 m hurdles	Orlando Ortega			13.33	1st Q	13.30	3rd place, bronze medalist(s)
110 m hurdles	Dayron Robles			13.22	1st Q	13.10 PR	1st place, gold medalist(s)
400 m hurdles	Omar Cisneros			48.99	1st Q	47.99 PR	1st place, gold medalist(s)
400 m hurdles	Amaurys Raúl Valle			51.29	5th	did not advance	
3000 m steeplechase	Yosvany Rodríguez					DNF	
3000 m steeplechase	José Alberto Sánchez					8:49.75	3rd place, bronze medalist(s)
4 × 100 m relay	David Lescay; Michael Herrera; Víctor González; Roberto Skyers			39.79	5th Q	39.75	4th
4 × 400 m relay	Noel Ruíz; Raidel Acea; Omar Cisneros; William Collazo; Yunior Díaz^{*} Amaurys Valle^{*}			3:04.33	1st Q	2:59.43 SB	1st place, gold medalist(s)
Marathon	Henry Jaén					2:31:30	15th

^{*}-Indicates athletes that participated in the preliminaries but not the finals

=== Field events ===
Event	Athletes	Semifinal		Final	
Event	Athletes	Result	Rank	Result	Rank
High jump	Víctor Rafael Moya			2.26 m.	3rd place, bronze medalist(s)
Pole vault	Lázaro Eduardo Borges			5.80 m. PR	1st place, gold medalist(s)
Pole vault	Yankier Lara			5.40 m.	6th
Long jump	Yunior Díaz	7.21 m.	9th	did not advance	
Triple jump	Yoandri Betanzos			16.54 m.	2nd place, silver medalist(s)
Triple jump	Alexis Copello			17.21 m.	1st place, gold medalist(s)
Shot put	Carlos Véliz			20.76 m.	2nd place, silver medalist(s)
Shot put	Reynaldo Proenza			19.19 m. SB	7th
Discus throw	Jorge Yadian Fernández			65.58 m.	1st place, gold medalist(s)
Discus throw	Yunior Lastre			61.07 m.	4th
Hammer throw	Roberto Janet			69.46 m.	5th
Hammer throw	Noleysi Bicet			75.57 m.	3rd place, bronze medalist(s)
Javelin throw	Guillermo Martínez			87.20 m. PR	1st place, gold medalist(s)
Javelin throw	Michael Miranda			73.91 m.	9th

=== Combined events ===
Decathlon	Event	Yordanis García			Leonel Suárez		
Decathlon	Event	Results	Points	Rank	Results	Points	Rank
	100 m	10.68	933	3rd	11.01	858	8th
	Long jump	6.78 m.	762	10th	7.39 m.	908	2nd
	Shot put	14.81 m.	778	3rd	14.64 m. PB	768	4th
	High jump	2.05 m.	850	3rd	2.08 m.	878	1st
	400 m	48.84 PB	869	4th	49.76	826	8th
	110 m hurdles	14.22 PB	946	3rd	14.26 PB	941	5th
	Discus throw	40.20 m.	669	10th	45.54 m.	778	3rd
	Pole vault	4.80 m.	849	3rd	4.80 m.	849	2nd
	Javelin throw	63.81 m.	795	2nd	72.19 m.	923	1st
	1500 m	4:49.29	623	5th	4:45.78	644	4th
Final			8074	3rd place, bronze medalist(s)		8373	1st place, gold medalist(s)

=== Women ===
Event	Athletes	Semifinal		Final	
Event	Athletes	Time	Rank	Time	Rank
100 m	Nelkis Casabona	11.56	2nd Q	11.56	7th
200 m	Nelkis Casabona	23.34	1st Q	23.43	5th
200 m	Roxana Díaz	23.61	4th q	23.45 SB	6th
400 m	Aymée Martínez	52.76	2nd Q	52.09	4th
400 m	Daisurami Bonne	52.20	2nd Q	51.69 PB	2nd place, silver medalist(s)
800 m	Adriana Muñoz			2:04.08	1st place, gold medalist(s)
800 m	Rose Mary Almanza			2:04.82	4th
1500 m	Adriana Muñoz			4:26.09	1st place, gold medalist(s)
1500 m	Urdileidis Quiala			4:29.08	5th
5000 m	Yudileyvis Castillo			16:49.63	5th
5000 m	Yudisleidis Fuente			17:23.76	11th
10000 m	Yudileyvis Castillo			35:35.43	5th
100 m hurdles	Belkis Milanes	13.56	5th	did not advance	
100 m hurdles	Yenima Arenciabia	13.13	2nd Q	13.22	6th
4 × 100 m relay	Roxana Díaz; Nelkis Casabona; Grether Guillen; Dulaimi Odelin			43.97 SB	4th
4 × 400 m relay	Aymée Martínez; Daisurami Bonne; Diosmely Peña; Susana Clement			3:28.09	1st place, gold medalist(s)
Marathon	Deilin Belmonte			2:43:39	4th
Marathon	Yailen García			2:57:37	11th
20 km walk	Leisy Rodriguez			DSQ	

=== Field events ===
Event	Athletes	Semifinal		Final	
Event	Athletes	Result	Rank	Result	Rank
High jump	Lesyani Mayor			1.89 m. SB	1st place, gold medalist(s)
Pole vault	Dailis Caballero			4.10 m.	7th
Pole vault	Yarisley Silva			4.75 m. PR	1st place, gold medalist(s)
Long jump	Suslaidy Girat			6.60 m.	4th
Triple jump	Mabel Gay			14.28 m.	3rd place, bronze medalist(s)
Triple jump	Yargelis Savigne			14.36	2nd place, silver medalist(s)
Shot put	Misleydis González			18.57 m.	1st place, gold medalist(s)
Shot put	Mailín Vargas			17.98	4th
Discus throw	Yarelys Barrios			66.40 m. PR	1st place, gold medalist(s)
Discus throw	Denia Caballero			58.63 m.	3rd place, bronze medalist(s)
Hammer throw	Yipsi Moreno			75.72 m. RP	1st place, gold medalist(s)
Hammer throw	Arasay Maria Thondike			68.88 m.	4th
Javelin throw	Yanet Cruz			56.19 m.	3rd place, bronze medalist(s)
Javelin throw	Yainelis Ribeaux			56.21 m.	2nd place, silver medalist(s)

=== Combined events ===
Decathlon	Event	Gretchen Quintana			Yosmiany Pedroso		
Decathlon	Event	Results	Points	Rank	Results	Points	Rank
	100 m hurdles	13.98	981	3rd	14.13	960	5th
	High jump	1.65 m.	795	7th	1.74 m.	903	2nd
	Shot put	12.88 m. PB	719	5th	14.63 m. PB	836	1st
	200 m	24.45 PB	938	1st	25.48 PB	843	9th
	Long jump	5.75 m.	774	3rd	5.87 m.	810	2nd
	Javelin throw	35.21 m.	576	9th	44.23 m.	749	2nd
	800 m	2:24.71	761	7th	2:36.88	609	11th
Final			5544	4th		5710	2nd place, silver medalist(s)

== Badminton ==
Cuba has qualified two male and two female athletes in the individual and team badminton competitions.

Men

Athlete	Event	First round	Second round	Third round	Quarterfinals	Semifinals	Final
Athlete	Event	Opposition Result	Opposition Result	Opposition Result	Opposition Result	Opposition Result	Opposition Result
Ronald Toledo	Men's singles		Mitchel Wongsodikromo (SUR); W 21 – 18, 14 – 21, 21 – 13	Lino Munoz (MEX); L 12 – 21, 17 – 21	did not advance		
Osleni Guerrero	Men's singles	Federico Diaz (ARG); W 21 – 5, 21 – 15	Virgil Soeroredjo (SUR); W 21 – 11, 21 – 16	Rodolfo Ramírez (GUA); W 22 – 20, 23 – 21	Stephan Wojcikiewicz (CAN); W 10 – 21, 22 – 20, 21 – 18	Charles Pyne (JAM); W 21 – 18, 18 – 21, 21 – 18)	Kevin Cordón (GUA); L 21 – 23, 19 – 21 (silver)
Osleni Guerrero; Ronald Toledo	Men's doubles			Nelson Javier (DOM); Alberto Raposo (DOM); W 21 – 11, 21 – 17)	Howard Bach (USA); Tony Gunawan (USA); L 9 – 21, 14 – 21	did not advance	

Women

Athlete	Event	First round	Second round	Third round	Quarterfinals	Semifinals	Final
Athlete	Event	Opposition Result	Opposition Result	Opposition Result	Opposition Result	Opposition Result	Opposition Result
María L. Hernández	Women's singles		Naty Rangel (MEX); W 20 – 22, 21 – 12, 24 – 22	Christina Aicardi (PER); L 15 – 21, 21 – 11, 19 – 21	did not advance		
Chaviano Mislenis	Women's singles		Rena Wang (USA); L 10 – 21, 11 – 21	did not advance			
María L. Hernández; Chaviano Mislenis	Women's doubles		Christina Aicardi (PER); Claudia Rivero (PER); L 24 – 26, 16 – 21–26	did not advance			

Mixed

Athlete	Event	First round	Second round	Quarterfinals	Semifinals	Final
Athlete	Event	Opposition Result	Opposition Result	Opposition Result	Opposition Result	Opposition Result
Ronald Toledo; Chaviano Mislenis	Mixed doubles	Mitchel Wongsodikromo (SUR); Crystal Leefmans (SUR); L 21 – 23, 11 – 21	did not advance			
Osleni Guerrero; María L. Hernández	Mixed doubles	Federico Diaz (ARG); Victoria Valdesolo (ARG); W 21 – 12, 21 – 9	Bryan Valentin (PUR); Daneysha Santana (PUR); W 21 – 19, 21 – 9	Halim Ho (USA); Eva Lee (USA); L 15 – 21, 13 – 21	did not advance	

== Baseball ==
Cuba has qualified a baseball team of twenty athletes to participate.

=== Team ===
- José Dariel Abreu
- Yosvany Alarcón
- Freddy Álvarez
- Erisbel Arruebarrena
- Alexei Bell
- Rusney Castillo
- Frederich Cepeda
- Alfredo Despaigne
- Giorbis Duvergel
- Michel Enrique
- Miguel González
- Norberto González
- Yulieski González
- Yulieski Gourriel
- Dalier Hinojosa
- Miguel Lahera
- Jonder Martínez
- Frank Morejón
- Vicyohandrys Odelin
- Héctor Olivera
- Yadier Pedroso
- Ariel Pestano
- Rudy Reyes
- Alberto Soto

=== Standings ===
Pos	Team	W	L	RF	RA	RD	PCT	GB	Qualification
1	Cuba	3	0	22	16	+6	1.000	—	Advance to Semifinals
2	Canada	2	1	14	14	0	.667	1	Advance to Semifinals
3	Venezuela	1	2	14	15	−1	.333	2	
4	Puerto Rico	0	3	17	22	−5	.000	3	

=== Results ===
==== Preliminary round ====
Team	1	2	3	4	5	6	7	8	9	R	H	E
Cuba ◄	1	0	0	0	0	3	0	1	X	5	11	2
Venezuela	0	0	0	0	0	0	4	0	0	4	8	1
WP: Alberto César Soto (1–0) LP: Luis Torres (0–1) Sv: Yadier Pedroso (1); Home runs: CUB: José Dariel Abreu (1); VEN: None; Boxscore

Team	1	2	3	4	5	6	7	8	9	R	H	E
Canada	0	0	0	1	0	2	0	1	1	5	9	0
Cuba ◄	2	0	5	0	0	1	0	0	1	9	18	1
WP: Yulieski González (1–0) LP: Jay Johnson (0–1); Home runs: CAN: None; CUB: Frederich Cepeda (1), Alfredo Despaigne (1), José Dariel Abreu (1); Boxscore

Team	1	2	3	4	5	6	7	8	9	10	R	H	E
Cuba ◄	1	0	4	0	0	0	0	0	0	2	8	13	3
Puerto Rico	0	1	0	0	4	0	0	0	0	3	7	10	0
WP: Vicyohandri Odelín (1–0) LP: José De La Torre (0–1); Boxscore

==== Semifinal ====
Team	1	2	3	4	5	6	7	8	9	R	H	E
Cuba	0	0	2	2	0	2	1	3	0	10	14	1
United States ◄	0	5	2	5	0	0	0	0	0	12	11	1
WP: Randy Williams (1–0) LP: Freddy Álvarez (0–1) Sv: Scott Patterson (1); Home runs: CUB: Rudy Reyes (1); USA: None; Boxscore

==== Third Place ====
Team	1	2	3	4	5	6	7	8	9	R	H	E
Cuba ◄	2	1	0	2	0	1	0	0	X	6	10	0
Mexico	0	0	0	0	0	0	0	0	0	0	8	2
WP: Miguel González (1–0) LP: Walter Joel Silva (1–1); Home runs: CUB: Alfredo Despaigne (1), José Abreu (1), Yulieski Gurriel (1); MEX: None; Boxscore

2011 Pan American Games Bronze Medal

Cuba

== Basque pelota ==
Cuba has qualified two athletes each in the paleta leather pairs trinkete, paleta leather pairs 36m fronton, paleta leather pairs 30m fronton, frontenis pairs 30m fronton, women's paleta rubber pairs trinkete, and women's frontenis pairs 30m fronton competitions. Cuba has also qualified one athlete each in the mano singles trinkete and mano singles 36m fronton competitions.

=== Men ===
Athlete(s)	Event	Series 1	Series 2	Series 3	Series 4	Bronze Medal	Final	Rank
Athlete(s)	Event	Opposition Score	Opposition Score	Opposition Score	Opposition Score	Opposition Score	Opposition Score	Rank
Daniel Alonso; Cesar Rafael Arocha	Frontenis Pairs 30m Fronton	Delgado (USA) &Tejada; W 2–1 (12–6, 11–12,5–2)	Rodriguez (MEX) & Rodriguez; L 0–2(3–12,4–12)	Trucco (CHI) & Versluys; W 2–0 (12–2, 12–11)	Alberdi (ARG) & Clementin; W 2–0 (12–10, 12–7)		Rodriguez (MEX) & Rodriguez; L 0–2(2–12,5–12)	2nd place, silver medalist(s)
Jose Noel Fiffe; Jhoan Luis Torreblanca	Paleta Rubber Pairs 30m Fronton	Casellas (VEN) & Vera; W 2–0 (12–1, 12–7)	Camesaña (URU) & Lancelotti; W 2–1 (12–5, 10–12, 5–1)	Hurtado (MEX) & Rodriguez; L 0–2(8–12, 4–12)	Benique (PER) & Martinez; W 2–0 (12–3, 12–3)	Celaya (CHI) & De Orte; W 2–0 (12–4, 12–8)		3rd place, bronze medalist(s)
Dariel Leiva; Ruben Moya	Mano Doubles 36m Fronton	Salinas (VEN) & Vidal; W 2–0 (10–7, 10–7)	Alcantara (MEX) & Diaz; L 0–2(1–10, 0–10)	Huarte (USA) & Huarte; L 1–2(9–10, 10–7, 2–5)		Salinas (VEN) & Vidal; W 2–0 (10–6, 10–4)		3rd place, bronze medalist(s)
Henrry Despaigne	Mano Singles 36m Fronton	Urcelay (VEN); L 1–2(10–8, 4–10, 4–5)	Comas (ARG); W 2–0 (10–3, 10–8)			Urcelay (VEN); W 2–0(10–7, 10–8)		3rd place, bronze medalist(s)
Rafael Fernández; Azuan Perez	Paleta Leather Pairs 36m Fronton	Ledesma (MEX) & Mendiburu; W 2–1 (15–14, 11–15, 5–4)	Borrajo (VEN) & Reyes; W 2–0 (15–9, 15–9)	Callarelli (ARG) & Dorato; L 1–2 (15–11, 14–15, 0–5)	Rivas (URU) & Tavares; W 2–0 (15–9, 15–7)		Ledesma (MEX) & Mendiburu; W 2–1 (15–12, 14–15, 5–2)	1st place, gold medalist(s)
Darien Povea	Mano Singles Trinkete	Lacasa (VEN); W 2–0 (15–4, 15–3)	Lopez (MEX); L 0–2 (7–15, 4–15)	Etchevers (USA); W 2–0 (15–9, 15–12)			Lopez (MEX); L 0–2 (5–15, 6–15)	2nd place, silver medalist(s)
Frendy Fernandez; Anderson Jardines	Paleta Leather Pairs Trinkete	Herrera (MEX); Marin; W 2–0 (15–9, 15–11)	Baldizan (URU); Dufau; L 0–2 (6–15, 14–15)	Algarbe (ARG); Villegas; L 0–2 (8–15, 5–15)	Perez (CHI); Sáez; W 2–0 (15–3, 15–4)	Herrera (MEX); Marin; W 2–0 (15–5, 15–11)		3rd place, bronze medalist(s)

=== Women ===
Athlete(s)	Event	Series 1	Series 2	Series 3	Series 4	Bronze Medal	Final	Rank
Athlete(s)	Event	Opposition Score	Opposition Score	Opposition Score	Opposition Score	Opposition Score	Opposition Score	Rank
Yasmary de la Caridad Medina; Lisandra Lima	Frontenis Pairs 30m Fronton	Castillo (MEX) &Hernandez; L 0–2 (2–12, 7–12)	Bozzo (CHI) & Salgado; W 2–0(12–1,12–2)	Diaz (VEN) & Toro; W 2–0 (12–7, 12–10)	Podversich (ARG) & Zair; W 2–0 (12–7, 12–3)		Castillo (MEX) &Hernandez; L 0–2 (6–12, 5–12)	2nd place, silver medalist(s)
Daniela Darriba; Yurisleidis Milagros Allue; Yasmary de la Caridad Medina	Paleta Rubber Pairs Trinkete	Cepeda (MEX); Guillen; L 0–2 (8–15, 3–15)	Miranda (URU); Naviliat; L 0–2 (5–15, 6–15)	Garcia (ARG); Stele; L 0–2 (3–15, 3–15)	Apablaza (CHI); Solas; L 0–2 (14–16, 12–15)	did not advance		5th

== Beach volleyball ==
Cuba has qualified a men's and women's team in the beach volleyball competition.

Men

Athlete	Event	Preliminary round			Quarterfinals	Semifinals	Finals
Athlete	Event	Opposition Score	Opposition Score	Opposition Score	Opposition Score	Opposition Score	Opposition Score
Sergio Reynaldo Gonzalez; Karell Piña	Men	Yewddys Pérez (DOM); Germán Recio (DOM); W 25–23, 21–17	Alison Cerutti (BRA); Emanuel Rego (BRA); W 21–19, 21–11	Esteban Escobar (CRC); Bryan Monge (CRC); W 21–16, 23–21	Aldo Mirmontes (MEX); Juan Virgen (MEX); L 21–19, 16–21, 12–15	did not advance	

Women

Athlete	Event	Preliminary round			Quarterfinals	Semifinals	Finals
Athlete	Event	Opposition Score	Opposition Score	Opposition Score	Opposition Score	Opposition Score	Opposition Score
Niriam Sinal; Onayamis Sinal	Women	Ketty Chila (ECU); Ariana Vilela (ECU); W 18–21, 21–15, 15–13	Ayana Dyette (TRI); Elki Phillip (TRI); W 21–12, 21–14	Larissa França (BRA); Juliana Silva (BRA); L 16–21, 13–21	Yarleen Santiago (PUR); Yamileska Yantin (PUR); L 16–21, 18–21	did not advance	

== Boxing ==
Cuba qualified nine athletes in the 49 kg, 52 kg, 56 kg, 60 kg, 64 kg, 69 kg, 75 kg, 81 kg, and 91 kg men's categories.

=== Men ===
Athlete	Event	Preliminaries	Quarterfinals	Semifinals	Final
Athlete	Event	Opposition Result	Opposition Result	Opposition Result	Opposition Result
Yosbny Veitia	Light Flyweight		David Jimenez (CRC); W 14 – 2	Jantony Ortiz (PUR); W 14 – 9	Joselito Velázquez (MEX); L 12 – 20 (silver)
Robeisy Ramírez	Flyweight		John William Franklin (USA); W RSC Round3 3:00	Braulio Ávila (MEX); W 20 – 7	Dagoberto Aguero (DOM); W 24 – 10 (gold)
Lázaro Álvarez	Bantamweight		Luis Salazar Estevez (DOM); W 18 – 5	Angel Jose Rodriguez (COL); W 17 – 7	Óscar Valdez (MEX); W 19 – 15 (gold)
Yasniel Toledo	Lightweight	Julio Laguna (NCA); W RSC Round1 3:00	Fradimil Macayo (VEN); W 24 – 5	Angel Gutierrez (MEX); W 13 – 7	Robson Da Conceicao (BRA); W 16 – 11 (gold)
Roniel Iglesias	Light Welterweight	Juan Pablo Romero (MEX); W 17 – 10	Jose Maria Virula (GUA); W 19 – 10	Éverton Lopes (BRA); W 18 – 9	Valentino Knowles (BAH); W 22 – 14 (gold)
Robeisy Ramírez	Welterweight	Alberto Palmetta (ARG); W 15 – 5	Gabriel Maestre (VEN); W 20 – 7	Myke De Carvalho (BRA); W PTS (14–14)-53 – 45	Óscar Molina (MEX); W 20 – 13 (gold)
Robeisy Ramírez	Middleweight	Damarias Russell (USA); W 27 – 4	David Da Costa (BRA); W 12 – 4	Brody Blair (CAN); W 30 – 7	Jaime Cortez (ECU); W 18 – 6 (gold)
Robeisy Ramírez	Light Heavyweight		Jefferey Spencer (USA); W 19 – 2	Carlos Góngora (ECU); W 19 – 9	Yamaguchi Florentino (BRA); W 22 – 12 (gold)
Lenier Pero	Heavyweight		Steven Couture (CAN); W 22 – 2	Yamil Peralta Jara (ARG); W 13 – 9	Julio César Castillo (COL); W 16 – 10 (gold)

== Canoeing ==
Cuba has qualified twelve boats in the K-1 200, K-2 200, K-1 1000, K-2 1000, K-4 1000, C-1 200, C-1 1000, C-2 1000, women's K-1 200, women's K-1 500, women's K-2 500 and women's K-4 500 categories.

=== Men ===
Athlete(s)	Event	Heats		Semifinals		Final	
Athlete(s)	Event	Time	Rank	Time	Rank	Time	Rank
Roleysi Baez	C-1 200 m	41.291	2nd QF			41.403	3rd place, bronze medalist(s)
Reydel Ramos	C-1 1000 m					4:03.973	2nd place, silver medalist(s)
Karel Aguilar; Serguey Torres	C-2 1000 m					3:39.280	1st place, gold medalist(s)
Reinier Mora	K-1 200 m	36.560	2nd QF			36.686	4th
Jorge Antonio Garcia	K-1 1000 m					3:41.257	1st place, gold medalist(s)
Reinier Mora; Fidel Antonio Vargas	K-2 200 m	32.909	2nd QF			33.280	4th
Reinier Torres; Jorge Antonio Garcia	K-2 1000 m					3:19.158	2nd place, silver medalist(s)
Jorge Antonio Garcia; Osvaldo Labrada; Reinier Torres; Maikel Daniel Zuluaga	K-4 1000 m					3:01.061	1st place, gold medalist(s)

=== Women ===
Athlete(s)	Event	Heats		Semifinals		Final	
Athlete(s)	Event	Time	Rank	Time	Rank	Time	Rank
Darisleydis Amador	K-1 200 m	41.876	1st QF			41.840	2nd place, silver medalist(s)
Annes Peñate	K-1 500 m	2:00.406	3rd QF			1:59.054	5th
Dayexi Gandarela; Yulitza Meneses	K-2 500 m	1:49.502	1st QF			1:47.332	1st place, gold medalist(s)
Dayexi Gandarela; Yulitza Meneses; Darisleydis Amador; Yusmari Mengana	K-4 500 m					1:39.105	3rd place, bronze medalist(s)

== Cycling ==
=== Road Cycling ===
Men

Athlete	Event	Time	Rank
Arnold Alcolea	Road race	3:41:48	3rd place, bronze medalist(s)
Yans Carlos Arias	Road race	3:42:04	8th
Lizardo Benitez	Road race	3:45:04	14th
Ramon Lazaro Martin	Road race	3:50:58	33rd
Arnold Alcolea	Time trial	52:10.73	10th

Women

Athlete	Event	Time	Rank
Yudelmis Domínguez	Road race	2:18:23	3rd place, bronze medalist(s)
Yumari González	Road race	2:18:23	2nd place, silver medalist(s)
Arlenis Sierra	Road race	2:18:10	1st place, gold medalist(s)
Dalila Rodriguez	Time trial	29:32.26	11th
Yudelmis Domínguez	Time trial	DNF	

=== Track cycling ===
==== Sprints & Pursuit ====
Athlete	Event	Qualifying		Round of 8	1/8 finals (repechage)	Quarterfinals	Semifinals	Final
Athlete	Event	Time Speed (km/h)	Rank	Opposition Time Speed	Opposition Time Speed	Opposition Time Speed	Opposition Time Speed	Opposition Time Speed
Alejandro Mainat	Men's sprint	10.426	12th	Njisane Phillip (TRI); L 10.690	Ángel Pulgar (VEN); L 10.392			did not advance
Yans Carlos Arias; Rubén Companioni; Leandro Marcos; Ramon Lazaro Martin; Pedro Sibila	Men's team pursuit	4:15.824	7th					did not advance
Lisandra Guerra	Women's sprint	11.126	2nd			Dana Feiss (USA); W 2 – 0	Diana García (COL); W 2 – 1	Daniela Larreal (VEN); W 2 – 0 (gold)
Laura Arias	Women's sprint	11.593	8th			Daniela Larreal (VEN); L 0 – 2		5th–8th place race: 7th
Lisandra Guerra; Arianna Herrera	Women's team sprint	34.907	5th					did not advance
Yumari González; Dalila Rodriguez; Yudelmis Domínguez	Women's team pursuit	3:26.745	2nd					Canada; L 3:25.335 (silver)

==== Keirin ====
Athlete	Event	1st round	Repechage	Final
Alejandro Mainat	Men's keirin	3rd R	4th	DNA
Lisandra Guerra	Women's keirin			7th

==== Omnium ====
Athlete	Event	Flying Lap Time Rank	Points Race Points Rank	Elimination Race Rank	Ind Pursuit Time	Scratch Race Rank	Time Trial Time	Final Rank
Rubén Companioni	Men	13.379; 2nd	14; 7th	8th	4:30.156; 2nd	-2; 9th	1:04.320; 3rd	31; 4th
Marlies Mejías	Women	14.404; 1st	12; 9th	5th	3:38.126; 2nd	0; 6th	35.211 PR; 1st	24 (bronze)

=== Mountain Biking ===
Men

Athlete	Event	Time	Rank
Lizardo Benitez	Cross-country	DNF	
Vincente Sanabria	Cross-country	DNF	

== Diving ==
=== Men ===
Athlete(s)	Event	Preliminary		Final	
Athlete(s)	Event	Points	Rank	Points	Rank
Rene Paul Hernandez	3 m springboard	380.30	9th Q	353.40	11th
Jorge Luis Pupo	3 m springboard	360.25	12th Q	417.75	9th
Jeinkler Aguirre	10 m platform	414.95	7th Q	458.10	4th
Rene Paul Hernandez; Jorge Luis Pupo	3 m synchronized springboard			384.33	3rd place, bronze medalist(s)
Jeinkler Aguirre; José Antonio Guerra	10 m synchronized platform			447.57	2nd place, silver medalist(s)

=== Women ===
Athlete(s)	Event	Preliminary		Final	
Athlete(s)	Event	Points	Rank	Points	Rank
Daylet Valdes	3 m springboard	228.15	10th Q	221.30	12th
Yoslaidi Herrera	3 m springboard	149.00	15th	did not advance	
Annia Rivera	10 m platform	268.35	8th Q	267.90	7th
Yoslaidi Herrera; Daylet Valdes	3 m synchronized springboard			253.02	4th
Annia Rivera; Yaima Rosario Mena	10 m synchronized platform			269.28	3rd place, bronze medalist(s)

== Fencing ==
Cuba has qualified athletes in the men's and women's individual and team épée, foil, and sabre competitions.

=== Men ===
Event	Athlete	Round of Poules		Round of 16	Quarterfinals	Semifinals	Final
Event	Athlete	Result	Seed	Opposition Score	Opposition Score	Opposition Score	Opposition Score
Individual épée	Ringo Quinteros	4 V – 1 D	2nd Q	Jhon Rodriguez (COL); W 14 – 3	Reynier Henriquez (CUB); L 9 – 15	did not advance	
Individual épée	Reynier Henriquez	3 V – 2 D	7th Q	Omar Carrillo (MEX); W 15 – 12	Ringo Quinteros (CUB); W 15 – 9	Weston Kelsey (USA); L 10 – 13 (bronze)	did not advance
Team épée	Reynier Henriquez; Ringo Quinteros; Yunior Reitor				Venezuela; L 40 – 45	5th–8th place match: Mexico; W 45 – 34	5th–6th place match: Colombia; W 45 – 34; 5th
Individual foil	Pedro Mogena	4 V – 1 D	4th Q	Raul Arizago (MEX); L 10 – 15	did not advance		
Individual foil	Yosniel Alvarez	2 V – 3 D	14th Q	Anthony Primack (CAN); L 12 – 15	did not advance		
Team foil	Pedro Mogena; Yosniel Alvarez; Yoelkis Zamora				United States; L 28 – 45	5th–8th place match: Argentina; W 45 – 26	5th–6th place match: Colombia; L 33 – 45; 6th
Individual sabre	Daylon Gilberto Diaz	4 V – 1 D	5th Q	William De Moraes (BRA); W 15 – 7	Hernán Jansen (VEN); L 13 – 15	did not advance	
Individual sabre	Yoandys Iriarte	2 V – 3 D	11th Q	Ricardo Bustamante (ARG); W 15 – 8	Timothy Morehouse (USA); L 6 – 15	did not advance	
Team sabre	Daylon Gilberto Diaz; Yoandys Iriarte; Julio Leonides Bello				United States; L 36 – 45	5th–8th place match: Chile; W 45 – 29	5th–6th place match: Argentina; L 37 – 45; 6th

=== Women ===
Event	Athlete	Round of Poules		Round of 16	Quarterfinals	Semifinals	Final
Event	Athlete	Result	Seed	Opposition Score	Opposition Score	Opposition Score	Opposition Score
Individual épée	Yamirka Rodriguez	5 V – 0 D	1st Q	Clarisse De Menezes (BRA); W 15 – 10	Eliana Lugo (VEN); W 14 – 13	Courtney Hurley (USA); L 12 – 13 (bronze)	did not advance
Individual épée	Zuleydis Ortiz	2 V – 3 D	12th Q	Ainsley Zwitzer (CAN); L 10 – 15	did not advance		
Team épée	Yamirka Rodriguez; Zuleydis Ortiz; Seily Mendoza				Venezuela; L 35 – 45	5th–8th place match: Brazil; W 45 – 35	5th–6th place match: Chile; W 45 – 39; 5th
Individual foil	Misleydys Compañi	4 V – 1 D	3rd Q	Johana Fuenmayor (VEN); L 4 – 15	did not advance		
Individual foil	Yuleidy Terry	3 V – 2 D	7th Q	Alely Hernandez (MEX); L 13 – 15	did not advance		
Team foil	Misleydys Compañi; Yuleidy Terry; Adriagne Rivot				Canada; L 33 – 45	5th–8th place match: Mexico; W 45 – 29	5th–6th place match: Puerto Rico; W 45 – 22; 5th
Individual sabre	Yaritza Goulet	3 V – 2 D	9th Q	Élora Pattaro (BRA); W 15 – 5	Melanie Mercado (PUR); W 15 – 11	Mariel Zagunis (USA); L 7 – 15 (bronze)	did not advance
Individual sabre	Yexi Salazar	2 V – 3 D	13th Q	Mariel Zagunis (USA); L 11 – 15	did not advance		
Team sabre	Yaritza Goulet; Yexi Salazar; Jennifer Morales				United States; L 36 – 45	5th–8th place match: Argentina; W 45 – 28	5th–6th place match: Brazil; W 45 – 29; 5th

== Field hockey ==
Cuba has qualified a men's and women's team in the field hockey competition.

=== Men ===
Team

- Alexander Abreu
- Roger Aguilera
- Jeancel Barzaga
- Yoandy Blanco
- Jasel Cabrera
- Yendry Delgado
- Lazaro Garcia
- Yendrys Herrera
- Roberto Lemus
- Yuri Perez
- Vladimir Prado
- Yankel Rojas
- Heriberto Sarduy
- Darian Valero
- Yoel Veitia
- Ederbeni Zayas

Standings

Pos	Team	Pld	W	D	L	GF	GA	GD	Pts	Qualification
1	Argentina	3	3	0	0	20	1	+19	9	Semi-finals
2	Cuba	3	2	0	1	7	13	−6	6	Semi-finals
3	Mexico (H)	3	1	0	2	4	12	−8	3	
4	United States	3	0	0	3	4	9	−5	0	

Source: PAHF
(H) Hosts

Results

October 20, 2011
16:00

United States	2–4	Cuba
Holt 35', 38'	Report	Sarduy 19', 49'; Blanco 53'; Perez 56'

Pan American Hockey Stadium
Umpires:
Wright (RSA), Lim (SIN)

October 22, 2011
9:00

Mexico	1–2	Cuba
Aguilar 52'	Report	Valero 61'; Sarduy 63'

Pan American Hockey Stadium
Umpires:
Springer (BAR), Vatter (CHI)

October 24, 2011
2:00

Argentina	10–1	Cuba
Bergner 23', 27', 34'; Ibarra 25', 50', 62', 63'; Rossi 38'; R. Vila 67'; M. Vila 70'	Report	Blanco 13'

Pan American Hockey Stadium
Umpires:
Vatter (CHI), Lim (SIN)

Semifinals

October 27, 2011
11:30

Canada	3–2	Cuba
Guest 1'; Tupper 6'; Singh 21'	Report	Blanco 14'; Lemus 49'

Pan American Hockey Stadium
Umpires:
Barbas (ARG), Hundley (USA)

Bronze medal match

October 29, 2011
15:00

Cuba	3–4	Chile
Sarduy 9'; Blanco 52', 55'	Report	Zarhi 19'; Zirpel 23'; Richter 32'; Berczely 69'

Pan American Hockey Stadium
Umpires:
Barbas (ARG), Soteriades II (USA)

=== Women ===
Team

- Yailyn Abrahan
- Kenia Alvarez
- Mileysi Argentel
- Osdelaisy Carmenate
- Helec Carta
- Yeney Casas
- Yordalia Duquernes
- Maribel Garcia
- Roseli Harrys
- Yaniuska Pasa
- Annelis Reyna
- Teydi Rodriguez
- Marisbel Sierra
- Damnay Solis
- Anisley Texido
- Yuraima Vera

Standings

Team	Pld	W	D	L	GF	GA	GD	Pts
United States (A)	3	3	0	0	16	1	+15	9
Chile (A)	3	2	0	1	8	2	+6	6
Cuba	3	1	0	2	3	16	−13	3
Mexico	3	0	0	3	1	9	−8	0

(A) Advanced to the semifinals

Results

October 19, 2011
16:00

Chile	6–0	Cuba
Urroz 5'; Fernandez 16'; Infante 23'; Villagra 41' 56'; Fingerhuth 58'	Report

Pan American Hockey Stadium

October 21, 2011
09:00

Mexico	1–3	Cuba
Navarro 70'	Report	Vera 4' 13'; Sierra 61'

Pan American Hockey Stadium
Umpires:
Hudson (NZL), McClean (TRI)

October 23, 2011
14:00

United States	9–0	Cuba
O'Donnell 2', 44'; Laubach 15', 17'; Nichols 21', 33'; Falgowski 26'; Kasold 46'; Selenski 55'	Report

Pan American Hockey Stadium
Umpires:
Hudson (NZL), Villafañe (ARG)

Crossover

October 26, 2011
17:30

Cuba	2–1	Trinidad and Tobago
Carmenate 32'; Argentel 62'	Report	Wynne 8'

Pan American Hockey Stadium
Umpires:
Metchette (IRL), Castellanos (MEX)

Fifth place match

October 28, 2011
11:30

Cuba	3–2	Mexico
Vera 28'; Sierra 35', 65'	Report	Navarro 23', 45'

Pan American Hockey Stadium
Umpires:
Judefind (USA), Villafañe (ARG)

== Football ==
Cuba has qualified a men's team in the football competition.

=== Men ===
==== Squad ====
- Dalain Aira
- Dayron Blanco
- Carlos Castellanos
- Maikel Chang
- Odisnel Cooper
- Heviel Cardoves
- Jorge Corrales
- Adrián Diz
- Ernesto Duanes
- Carlos Francisco
- Dayan Hernandez
- José Macías
- Renay Malblanche
- Ricardo Pena
- Andy Ramos
- Yasnay Rivero
- Francisco Salazar
- Over Urgelles

==== Standings ====
Pos	Team	Pld	W	D	L	GF	GA	GD	Pts	Qualification
1	Argentina	3	2	1	0	5	1	+4	7	Advance to Semifinals
2	Costa Rica	3	2	0	1	4	4	0	6	Advance to Semifinals
3	Brazil	3	0	2	1	2	4	−2	2	
4	Cuba	3	0	1	2	0	2	−2	1	

==== Results ====
October 19, 2011
10:00

Costa Rica	1–0	Cuba
Blanco 55'	Report

Estadio Omnilife, Guadalajara
Referee: Ricardo Arellano (Mexico)

October 21, 2011
17:00

Brazil	0–0	Cuba
	Report

Estadio Omnilife, Guadalajara
Referee: Raúl Orosco (Bolivia)

October 23, 2011
13:00

Cuba	0–1	Argentina
	Report	Laba 79'

Estadio Omnilife, Guadalajara
Referee: Erick Roberto Andino (Honduras)

== Gymnastics ==
=== Artistic ===
Cuba has qualified two male athletes and six female athletes in the artistic gymnastics competition.

Men

Individual qualification & Team Finals

Athlete	Event	Apparatus						Qualification		Final	
Athlete	Event	Floor	Pommel horse	Rings	Vault	Parallel bars	Horizontal bar	Total	Rank	Total	Rank
Carlos Miguel Campaña	Ind Qualification	13.600	10.500	12.900	15.350	14.350	13.750	80.450	21st		
Ernesto Vila	Ind Qualification	12.000	11.000	13.050	15.400	13.350	12.950	77.750	25th		

Individual Finals

Athlete	Event	Final							
Athlete	Event	Floor	Pommel horse	Rings	Vault	Parallel bars	Horizontal bar	Total	Rank
Carlos Miguel Campaña	Individual All-around	12.900	12.550	12.750	14.850	14.400	13.800	81.250	13th
Carlos Miguel Campaña	Individual Parallel Bars					14.400		14.400	6th
Ernesto Vila	Individual All-around	14.500	12.250	13.550	15.600	14.650	11.350	81.900	11th

Women
Individual qualification & Team Finals

Athlete	Event	Apparatus				Qualification		Final	
Athlete	Event	Vault	Uneven bars	Balance Beam	Floor	Total	Rank	Total	Rank
Yaney Hernandez	Ind Qualification	13.375	11.650	12.850	12.225	50.100	27th		
Dayana Rodriguez	Ind Qualification	13.975	11.775	12.700	12.725	51.175	23rd		
Yahajara Sese	Ind Qualification	13.950	10.525	12.275	12.150	48.900	33rd		
Dovelis Torres	Ind Qualification	14.175	12.050	11.975	13.500	51.700	19th		
Team Totals	Team All-around	55.475	46.000	49.800	50.600			201.875	7th

Individual Finals

Athlete	Event	Apparatus				Final	
Athlete	Event	Vault	Uneven bars	Balance Beam	Floor	Total	Rank
Dovelis Elena Torres	Individual All-around	14.025	12.000	12.825	13.375	52.225	11th
Dovelis Elena Torres	Individual Floor				13.100	13.100	7th
Dayana Rodriguez	Individual All-around	13.900	12.475	12.800	12.450	51.625	13th

=== Rhythmic ===
Cuba has qualified two individual athletes and one team in the rhythmic gymnastics competition.

Individual

All Around

Athlete	Event	Final					
Athlete	Event	Hoop	Rope	Clubs	Ribbon	Total	Rank
Dailen Cutino	Individual	21.150	22.625	22.900	23.000	89.675	11th
Dailen Cutino	Clubs			22.600		22.600	8th
Danays Perez	Individual	21.925	18.250	20.450	19.150	79.775	16th

Group

All Around

Team	Event	Final			
Team	Event	5 Balls	3 Ribbons + 2 Hoops	Total	Rank
Maydelis Delgado; Zenia Fernandez; Lianet Jose; Martha Perez; Yeney Renovales; Legna Savon	Group	23.600	23.575	47.175	3rd place, bronze medalist(s)
Maydelis Delgado; Zenia Fernandez; Lianet Jose; Martha Perez; Yeney Renovales; Legna Savon	Group 5 Balls	24.425		24.425	4th
Maydelis Delgado; Zenia Fernandez; Lianet Jose; Martha Perez; Yeney Renovales; Legna Savon	Group 3 Ribbons & 2 Hoops		21.450	21.450	5th

=== Trampoline ===
Cuba has qualified one female athlete in the trampoline gymnastics competition.

Women

Athlete	Event	Qualification		Final	
Athlete	Event	Score	Rank	Score	Rank
Yunairi Socarras	Individual	85.715	7th Q	9.835	7th

== Judo ==
Cuba has qualified athletes in all fourteen men's and women's weight categories.

Men

Athlete	Event	Round of 16	Quarterfinals	Semifinals	Final
Athlete	Event	Opposition Result	Opposition Result	Opposition Result	Opposition Result
Antonio Betancourt	−60 kg	Javier Antonio Guedez (VEN); L 000 – 001 S1	did not advance		
Anyelo Gomez	−66 kg		Ricardo Valderrma (VEN); L 003 S3 – 010 S2	did not advance (to repechage round)	
Ronal Girones	−73 kg		Sergio Sar Pellejero (URU); W 100 – 000	Alejandro Clara (ARG); L 001 S1 – 010 S2	did not advance (to repechage round)
Osmay Cruz	−81 kg		Gadiel Miranda (PUR); L 000 S2 – 001 S1	did not advance (to repechage round)	
Asley González	−90 kg		Rafael Romo (CHI); W 101 – 000 S2	Jacob Ryan Larsen (USA); W 121 S1 – 000	Tiago Camilo (BRA); L 000 S1 – 100 (silver)
Oreydi Despaigne	−100 kg	Camilo Castaño (COL); W 120 – 000 S1	Stefan Swierz (CAN); W 010 – 000 S3	Cristian Adolfo Schmidt (ARG); W 010 S2 – 001 S3	Luciano Corrêa (BRA); L 001 S3 – GS 010 S2 (silver)
Oscar Rene Brayson	+100 kg		Pablo figueroa (PUR); W 100 – 000	Luis Ignasio Salazar (COL); W 100 – 000	Rafael CArlos Da Silva (BRA); W 010 – 000 (gold)

Repechage Rounds

Athlete	Event	Repechage 8	Repechage Final	Bronze Final
Athlete	Event	Opposition Result	Opposition Result	Opposition Result
Anyelo Gomez	−66 kg		Flavio Israel Verdugo (ECU); W 002 S2 – 001 S2	Francisco Carreón (MEX); W GS 001 S1 – 000 S2 (bronze)
Ronal Girones	−73 kg			Michael Eldred (USA); W 001 S1 – 000 S2 (bronze)
Osmay Cruz	−81 kg		Eduardo Adrian Avila (MEX); W 010 S1 – 000 S3	Antoine Valois (CAN); L 000 – 110

Women

Athlete	Event	Round of 16	Quarterfinals	Semifinals	Final
Athlete	Event	Opposition Result	Opposition Result	Opposition Result	Opposition Result
Dayaris Rosa Mestre	−48 kg		Diana Belen Cobos (ECU); W 100 – 000 S1	Sarah Menezes (BRA); W 001 S1 – 000 S1	Paula Pareto (ARG); L 001 S1 – 110 S2 (silver)
Yanet Bermoy	−52 kg		Lesley Angela Huaman (PER); W 101 – 000 S1	Angelica Delgado (USA); W 100 – 000	Érika Miranda (BRA); W 101 – 000 (gold)
Yurisleidy Lupetey	−57 kg		Belen Achurra (CHI); W 100 – 000	Melissa Rodríguez (ARG); W 111 S1 – 000 S3	Rafaela Silva (BRA); W 001 – 000 S2 (gold)
Yaritza Abel	−63 kg		Stéfanie Tremblay (CAN); W 100 – 000	Dina Marcela Velazco (COL); W 100 – 000	Karina Acosta Paloma (MEX); W 100 S2 – 001 (gold)
Onix Cortés	−70 kg		Kathleen Helen Sell (USA); W 100 – 000 S1	Kelita Ivana Zupancic (CAN); W 100 – 000	Yuri Alvear (COL); W 001 S1 – 000 S1 (gold)
Yalennis Castillo	−78 kg		Lenia Ruvalcaba (MEX); W 100 – 000	Kayla Jean Harrison (USA); W 001 S2 – GS 002 S2	did not advance (to repechage round)
Idalys Ortiz	+78 kg		Molly O'Rourke (USA); W 100 – 000	Vanessa Zambotti (MEX); W 002 S1 – 000 S2	Melissa Mojica (PUR); W 101 – 000 S4 (gold)

Repechage Rounds

Athlete	Event	Repechage 8	Repechage Final	Bronze Final
Athlete	Event	Opposition Result	Opposition Result	Opposition Result
Yalennis Castillo	−78 kg			Anny Lorena Cortes (COL); W 100 – 000 S4 (bronze)

== Karate ==
Cuba has qualified two athletes in the 67 kg and 75 kg men's categories and two athlete in the 55 kg and 68 kg women's category.

Athlete	Event	Round robin (Pool A/B)			Semifinals	Final
Athlete	Event	Match 1	Match 2	Match 3	Semifinals	Final
Athlete	Event	Opposition Result	Opposition Result	Opposition Result	Opposition Result	Opposition Result
Dennis Novo	Men's −67 kg	Brian Merterl (USA); HWK 0:0	Daniel Viveros (ECU); HWK 0:0	Delvis Ferrera (DOM); W PTS 5:0	Jean Carlos Peña (VEN); W PTS 2:0	Daniel Viveros (ECU); L PTS 1:7 (silver)
Lester Zamora	Men's −75 kg	Israel Aco (PER); W PTS 2:1	Antonio Gutierrez (MEX); W PTS 4:1	David Dubo (CHI); L PTS 0:1	Thomas A. Scott (USA); L PTS 1:2 (bronze)	Did not advance
Yanelsis Gongora	Women's −55 kg	Valéria Kumizaki (BRA); L PTS 0:1	Karina Diaz (DOM); HWK 3:3	Jacqueline Factos (ECU); L PTS 1:5	did not advance	
Yoandra Moreno	Women's −68 kg	Elizabeth Retamal (CHI); W PTS 2:0	Lucelia Ribeiro (BRA); HWK 0:0	Ashley Binns Miranda (CRC); HWK 2:2	Ydira Lira (MEX); L PTS 0:1 (bronze)	did not advance

== Modern pentathlon ==
Cuba has qualified two male and two female pentathletes.

Men

Athlete	Event	Fencing Victories (pts)	Swimming Time (pts)	Equestrian Score (pts)	Running & Shooting Time (pts)	Total	Rank
Yaniel Velazquez	Individual	10 (748)	2:11.10 (1228)	0.00 (1200)	12:00.63 (2144)	5292	13
Abel Alvarez	Individual	7 (640)	2:11.20 (1228)	20.00 (1180)	11:57.96 (2128)	5176	15

Women

Athlete	Event	Fencing Victories (pts)	Swimming Time (pts)	Equestrian Score (pts)	Running & Shooting Time (pts)	Total	Rank
Leidy Moya	Individual	16 (832)	2:27.24 (1036)	212.00 (988)	13:20.26 (1800)	4656	11
Kenia Campos	Individual	19 (916)	2:25.61 (1056)	192.00 (1008)	14:23.84 (1556)	4536	12

== Roller skating ==
Cuba has qualified a men's team in the roller skating competition.

Men

Athlete	Event	Qualification		Final	
Athlete	Event	Result	Rank	Result	Rank
Guillermo Muñoz	300 m time trial			26.158	4th
Guillermo Muñoz	1,000 m	1:29.543	5th	did not advance	
Tony Garcia	10,000 m			0	5th

Artistic

Athlete	Event	Short Program		Long Program	
Athlete	Event	Result	Rank	Result	Rank
Daniel Curbelo	Free skating	105.70	7th	103.50	7th

Women

Artistic

Athlete	Event	Short Program		Long Program	
Athlete	Event	Result	Rank	Result	Rank
Jessica Gonzalez	Free skating	102.00	11th	101.30	11th

== Rowing ==
Men

Athlete(s)	Event	Heat		Repechage		Final	
Athlete(s)	Event	Time	Rank	Time	Rank	Time	Rank
Ángel Fournier	Single sculls (M1×)	7:13.41	1st Q			7:02.94	1st place, gold medalist(s)
Janier Concepción; Yoennis Hernández	Double sculls (M2×)	6:50.10	2nd Q			6:32.54	2nd place, silver medalist(s)
Yunior Perez; Eyder Batista	Lightweight double sculls (LM2×)	6:47.44	3rd R	6:48.25	1st Q	6:27.07	2nd place, silver medalist(s)
Janier Concepción; Adrian Oquendo; Eduardo Eubio; Yoennis Hernández	Quadruple sculls (M4×)	6:14.99	1st Q			5:51.69	2nd place, silver medalist(s)
Yenser Basilio; Dionnis Carrion	Coxless pair (M2-)	6:51.00	2nd Q			6:59.60	5th
Yenser Basilo; Dionnis Carrion; Jorber Avila; Solaris Freire	Coxless four (M4-)	6:41.15	3rd R	6:35.13	3rd Q	6:06.51	3rd place, bronze medalist(s)
Wilber Turro; Liosbel Hernandez; Liosmel Ramos; Manuel Suárez	Lightweight coxless four (LM4-)	6:07.25	3rd R	6:21.05	1st Q	6:06.06	1st place, gold medalist(s)
Yenser Basilo; Dionnis Carrion; Solaris Freire; Janier Concepción; Yoennis Hernández; Adrian Oquendo; Juan Gonzalez; Yunior Perez; Eduardo Rubio	Eight (M8+)	6:21.60	5th Q			5:45.69	5th

Women

Athlete(s)	Event	Heat		Repechage		Final	
Athlete(s)	Event	Time	Rank	Time	Rank	Time	Rank
Yariulvis Cobas	Single sculls (W1×)	8:10.43	4th R	8:11.92	2nd Q	8:13.63	4th
Yariulvis Cobas; Aimee Hernandez	Double sculls (W2×)	7:30.02	1st Q			7:13.76	1st place, gold medalist(s)
Yaima Velázquez; Yoslaine Dominguez	Lightweight double sculls (LW2×)	7:26.26	2nd Q			7:17.77	2nd place, silver medalist(s)
Yanisleidi Orama; Yariulvis Cobas; Aimee Hernandez; Yoslaine Dominguez	Quadruple sculls (W4×)	7:27.33	6th Q			6:40.05	4th
Yurileydis Vinet; Yeney Ochoa	Coxless pair (W2-)	8:07.07	4th Q			8:05.61	5th
Yaima Velázquez	Lightweight single sculls (LW1×)	8:24.13	1st Q			8:02.59	3rd place, bronze medalist(s)

== Sailing ==
Cuba has qualified three boats and four athletes in the sailing competition.

Men

Athlete	Event	Race											Net Points	Final Rank
Athlete	Event	1	2	3	4	5	6	7	8	9	10	M	Net Points	Final Rank
Juan Manuel Orta	Windsurfer (RS:X)	7	9	9	8	8	4	9	7	9	(10)	/	70.0	8th

Women

Athlete	Event	Race											Net Points	Final Rank
Athlete	Event	1	2	3	4	5	6	7	8	9	10	M	Net Points	Final Rank
Anayansi Perez	Windsurfer (RS:X)	(6)	6	6	6	6	5	5	6	4	6	/	50.0	6th

Open

Athlete	Event	Race											Net Points	Final Rank
Athlete	Event	1	2	3	4	5	6	7	8	9	10	M	Net Points	Final Rank
Michel Leiva; Yudier Suarez	Double-handed Dinghy (Snipe)	6	7 RDG	7	6	1	(11); DSQ	1	3	10	6	/	47.0	7th

== Shooting ==
Men

Event	Athlete	Qualification		Final	
Event	Athlete	Score	Rank	Score	Rank
10 m air pistol	Jorge Grau	572-15x	7th Q	673.1	4th
10 m air pistol	Elieser Mora	570-13x	10th	did not advance	
10 metre air rifle	Reynier Estopiñan	578-26x	20th	did not advance	
10 metre air rifle	Yoleisy Lois	582-31x	12th	did not advance	
25 metre rapid fire pistol	Juan Francisco Perez	568-11x	4th Q	591.0	2nd place, silver medalist(s)
25 metre rapid fire pistol	Leuris Pupo	547-17x	11th	did not advance	
50 metre pistol	Jorge Grau	535- 9x	13th	did not advance	
50 metre pistol	Yulio Zorrilla	545- 5x	7th	635.1	5th
50 metre rifle prone	Reynier Estopiñan	576-24x	21st	did not advance	
50 metre rifle prone	Maykel Guerra	577-26x	19th	did not advance	
50 metre rifle three positions	Reynier Estopiñan	1147- 44x	5th Q	1242.9	5th
50 metre rifle three positions	Yoleisy Lois	1122- 33x	18th	did not advance	
Skeet	Juan Miguel Rodríguez	121	3rd Q	142	3rd place, bronze medalist(s)
Skeet	Guillermo Alfredo Torres	122	2nd Q	145	2nd place, silver medalist(s)

Women

Event	Athlete	Qualification		Final	
Event	Athlete	Score	Rank	Score	Rank
10 m air pistol	Kirenia Bello	373-10x	5th Q	470.2	6th
10 m air pistol	Laina Pérez	365- 4x	17th	did not advance	
10 metre air rifle	Eglys Yahima De La Cruz	394-27x	2nd Q	497.3	2nd place, silver medalist(s)
10 metre air rifle	Dianelys Pérez	388-22x	9th	did not advance	
25 metre pistol	Laina Pérez	565-10x	7th Q	764.5	6th
25 metre pistol	Evelyn Rios	556- 9x	15th	did not advance	
50 metre rifle three positions	Eglys Yahima De La Cruz	571-20x	3rd Q	670.3	2nd place, silver medalist(s)
50 metre rifle three positions	Dianelys Pérez	576-22x	1st Q	671.6	1st place, gold medalist(s)

== Softball ==
Cuba has qualified a team to participate. The team will be made up of 17 athletes.

Team

- Yuselys Acosta
- Yanitza Avilés
- Marlen Bubaire
- Yamisleidys Casanova
- Lidibet Castellon
- Katia Coello
- Aleanna De Armas
- Leanneyi Gomez
- Anisley Lopez
- Ludisleydis Nápoles
- Yusmelis Ocana
- Yusmeri Pacheco
- Diamela Puentes
- Yarisleidy Rosario
- Maylin Sanchez
- Yaleisa Soto
- Maritza Toledo

Standings

Qualified for the semifinals
Eliminated

All times are Central Daylight Time (UTC−5)

Rank	Team	W	L	RS	RA
1	United States	7	0	54	6
2	Cuba	5	2	28	13
3	Venezuela	5	2	31	20
4	Canada	5	2	46	23
5	Dominican Republic	2	5	22	37
6	Mexico	2	5	18	37
7	Puerto Rico	2	5	27	42
8	Argentina	0	7	4	59

Results

October 17, 2011; 13:00	Argentina	0–7	Cuba	Pan American Softball Stadium, Guadalajara; Attendance: 100
October 17, 2011; 13:00		http://200.57.183.69/ENG/SO/SOR173A_SOW40040010100023ENG.htm		Pan American Softball Stadium, Guadalajara; Attendance: 100

October 18, 2011; 11:00	Puerto Rico	1–4	Cuba	Pan American Softball Stadium, Guadalajara; Attendance: 200
October 18, 2011; 11:00		http://200.57.183.69/ENG/SO/SOR173A_SOW40040010100011ENG.htm		Pan American Softball Stadium, Guadalajara; Attendance: 200

October 18, 2011; 18:00	Canada	2–4	Cuba	Pan American Softball Stadium, Guadalajara; Attendance: 773
October 18, 2011; 18:00		http://200.57.183.69/ENG/SO/SOR173A_SOW40040010100027ENG.htm		Pan American Softball Stadium, Guadalajara; Attendance: 773

October 19, 2011; 13:00	United States	3–0	Cuba	Pan American Softball Stadium, Guadalajara; Attendance: 375
October 19, 2011; 13:00		http://200.57.183.69/ENG/SO/SOR173A_SOW40040010100026ENG.htm		Pan American Softball Stadium, Guadalajara; Attendance: 375

October 19, 2011; 18:00	Venezuela	3–2	Cuba	Pan American Softball Stadium, Guadalajara; Attendance: 659
October 19, 2011; 18:00		http://200.57.183.69/ENG/SO/SOR173A_SOW40040010100020ENG.htm		Pan American Softball Stadium, Guadalajara; Attendance: 659

October 20, 2011; 18:00	Mexico	0–5	Cuba	Pan American Softball Stadium, Guadalajara; Attendance: 599
October 20, 2011; 18:00		http://200.57.183.69/ENG/SO/SOR173A_SOW40040010100016ENG.htm		Pan American Softball Stadium, Guadalajara; Attendance: 599

October 21, 2011; 9:00	Cuba	6–1	Dominican Republic	Pan American Softball Stadium, Guadalajara; Attendance: 150
October 21, 2011; 9:00		http://200.57.183.69/ENG/SO/SOR173A_SOW40040010100005ENG.htm		Pan American Softball Stadium, Guadalajara; Attendance: 150

Semifinals

October 22, 2011; 18:00	United States	13–1	Cuba	Pan American Softball Stadium, Guadalajara; Attendance: 0
October 22, 2011; 18:00		http://200.57.183.69/ENG/SO/SOR173A_SOW40040030100001ENG.htm		Pan American Softball Stadium, Guadalajara; Attendance: 0

Final

October 23, 2011; 10:00	Cuba	0–4	Canada	Pan American Softball Stadium, Guadalajara; Attendance: 359
October 23, 2011; 10:00		Boxscore		Pan American Softball Stadium, Guadalajara; Attendance: 359

2011 Pan American Games Bronze Medal

Cuba

== Swimming ==
Men

Event	Athletes	Heats		Final	
Event	Athletes	Time	Position	Time	Position
50 m Freestyle	Hanser García	22.37	2nd Q	22.15	3rd place, bronze medalist(s)
100 m Freestyle	Hanser García	49.08	3rd Q	48.34	2nd place, silver medalist(s)
100 m Backstroke	Pedro Luis Medel	56.71	6th Q	56.16	6th
200 m Backstroke	Pedro Luis Medel	2:05.20	6th Q	2:13.77	8th
100 m Breaststroke	Christian Hernandez	1:07.49	22nd	did not advance	
200 m Breaststroke	Christian Hernandez	2:28.25	16th QB	2:27.76	7th
100 m Butterfly	Alex Hernandez	55.28	13th QB	55.63	6th B
200 m Individual Medley	Pedro Luis Medel	2:10.46	10th	did not advance	
4 × 100 m Medley Relay	Pedro Luis Medel; Christian Hernandez; Alex Hernandez; Hanser García; Lazaro Vergara	3:55.50	8th	3:46.48	6th

Women

Event	Athletes	Heats		Final	
Event	Athletes	Time	Position	Time	Position
100 m butterfly	Yumisleisy Morales	1:05.64	19th	did not advance	
200 m butterfly	Yumisleisy Morales	2:19.07	9th QB	2:19.78	1st B

== Table tennis ==
Cuba has qualified three male and three female athletes in the individual and men's table tennis competition.

Men

Athlete	Event	Round robin			1st round	Eighthfinals	Quarterfinals	Semifinals	Final
Athlete	Event	Match 1	Match 2	Match 3	1st round	Eighthfinals	Quarterfinals	Semifinals	Final
Athlete	Event	Opposition Result	Opposition Result	Opposition Result	Opposition Result	Opposition Result	Opposition Result	Opposition Result	Opposition Result
Jorge Campos	Singles	Pablo Tabachnik (ARG); W 4 – 3	Juan Vila (VEN); W 4 – 1	Marcos Madrid (MEX); L 3 – 4	Felipe Olivares (CHI); W 4 – 2	Gustavo Tsuboi (BRA); W 4 – 3	Alberto Mino (COL); L 2 – 4	did not advance	
Pavel Oxamendi	Singles	Luis Mejía (ESA); W 4 – 2	Ju Lin (DOM); L 1 – 4	Mark Hazinski (USA); L 2 – 4	did not advance				
Andy Pereira	Singles	Jude Okoh (MEX); W 4 – 2	Yiyong Fan (USA); W 4 – 2	Emil Santos (DOM); W 4 – 0		Hugo Hoyama (BRA); W 4 – 2	Liu Song (ARG); L 2 – 4	did not advance	
Jorge Campos; Andy Pereira; Pavel Oxamendi	Team	Venezuela; W 3 – 1, 3 – 2, 3 – 0	El Salvador; W 3 – 0, 3 – 0, 3 – 0				Canada; W 3 – 2, 3 – 0, 2 – 3, 3 – 2	Brazil; L 3 – 1, 0 – 3, 3 – 2, 2 – 3, 1 – 3 (bronze)	did not advance

Women

Athlete	Event	Round robin			1st round	Eighthfinals	Quarterfinals	Semifinals	Final
Athlete	Event	Match 1	Match 2	Match 3	1st round	Eighthfinals	Quarterfinals	Semifinals	Final
Athlete	Event	Opposition Result	Opposition Result	Opposition Result	Opposition Result	Opposition Result	Opposition Result	Opposition Result	Opposition Result
Lisi Castillo	Singles	Karla Perez (ESA); W 4 – 0	Lily Zhang (USA); L 0 – 4	Francesca Vargas (PER); L 0 – 4	did not advance				
Glendys Gonzalez	Singles	Monica Serrano (MEX); W 4 – 2	Zhang Mo (CAN); L 0 – 4	Maria Soto (PER); W 4 – 0	Caroline Kumahara (BRA); L 1 – 4	did not advance			
Leisy Jimenez	Singles	Mercedes Madrid (MEX); W 4 – 0	Erica Wu (USA); W 4 – 3	Xue Wu (DOM); L 0 – 4	Berta Rodríguez (CHI); W 4 – 2	Zhang Mo (CAN); L 1 – 4	did not advance		
Glendys Gonzalez; Lisi Castillo; Leisy Jimenez	Team	Brazil; L 0 – 3, 3 – 1, 3 – 1, 0 – 3, 0 – 3	Mexico; W 1 – 3, 3 – 0, 3 – 2, 1 – 3, 3 – 0				Venezuela; L 3 – 2, 1 – 3, 1 – 3, 3 – 0, 1 – 3	did not advance	

== Taekwondo ==
Cuba has qualified four athletes in the 58 kg, 68 kg, 80 kg, and 80+kg men's categories and four athletes in the 49 kg, 57 kg, 67 kg, and 67+kg women's categories.

Men

Athlete	Event	Round of 16	Quarterfinals	Semifinals	Final
Athlete	Event	Opposition Result	Opposition Result	Opposition Result	Opposition Result
Frank Ismel Diaz	Flyweight (−58kg)	Nigel Cyril Ras (ARU); W 7 – 5	Óscar Muñoz (COL); W DSQ Ronda3 1:15	Yulis Gabriel Mercedes Reyes (DOM); L 2 – 11 (bronze)	did not advance
Angel Modesto Mora	Lightweight (−68kg)	Osvaldo Adolfo Caceres (PAR); W WDR Ronda3 0:50	Peter Lopez (PER); W 5 – 4	Mario Andres Guerra (CHI); W 12 – 6	Jhohanny Jean Bartermi (DOM); L 7 – 8 (silver)
Mario Juan Tellez	Middleweight (−80kg)	Staurdo Andres Solorzano (GUA); L 8 – 9	did not advance		
Robelis Despaigne	Heavyweight (+80kg)	Adrian Sagastume (GUA); W 7 – 1	Miguel Ferrera (HON); W 8 – 0	Françoise Coulombe (CAN); W 5 – 3	Juan Carlos Diaz (VEN); W 15 – 5 (gold)

Women

Athlete	Event	Round of 16	Quarterfinals	Semifinals	Final	
Athlete	Event	Opposition Result	Opposition Result	Opposition Result	Opposition Result	Rank
Daynelli Montejo	Flyweight (−49kg)	Ivett Gonda (CAN); L DSQ Ronda1 2:00	did not advance			
Nidia Muñoz	Lightweight (−57kg)	Maude Dufour (CAN); W 12 – 0	Irma Edith Contreras (MEX); L 8 – 10	did not advance		
Taimi Castellanos	Middleweight (−67kg)	Katherine Alvarado (CRC); W 10 – 0	Asunción Ocaso (PUR); W 2 – 1	Paige Arielle McPherson (USA); L 1 – 4 (bronze)	did not advance	
Glenhis Hernández	Heavyweight(+67kg)		Deysy Monte de Oca Silveiro (DOM); W 12 – 0	Lauren Cahoon Hamon (USA); W 4 – 1	Nikki Gabrielle Martinez (PUR); W 13 – 0 (gold)	

== Tennis ==
Men

Athlete	Event	1st Round	Round of 32	Round of 16	Quarterfinals	Semifinals	Final
Athlete	Event	Opposition Score	Opposition Score	Opposition Score	Opposition Score	Opposition Score	Opposition Score
William Dorante	Singles	Alexander Llompart (PUR); L 3 – 6, 2 – 6	did not advance				

Women

Athlete	Event	Round of 32	Round of 16	Quarterfinals	Semifinals	Final
Athlete	Event	Opposition Score	Opposition Score	Opposition Score	Opposition Score	Opposition Score
Misleydis Diaz	Singles	Florencia Molinero (ARG); L 1 – 6, 6(2) – 7	did not advance			
Misleydis Diaz; Yamile Fors	Doubles		Daniela Seguel (CHI); Camila Silva (CHI); L 6(3) – 7, 6 – 3, [9–11]	did not advance		

Mixed doubles

Athlete	Event	Round of 16	Quarterfinals	Semifinals	Final
Athlete	Event	Opposition Score	Opposition Score	Opposition Score	Opposition Score
Yamile Fors; William Dorante	Doubles	Karen Castiblanco (COL); Alejandro González (COL); W 1 – 6, 4 – 6	did not advance		

== Triathlon ==
=== Men ===
Athlete	Event	Swim (1.5 km)	Trans 1	Bike (40 km)	Trans 2	Run (10 km)	Total	Rank
Michel Gonzalez	Individual	18:11; 1st	0:25; 21st	57:25; 23rd	0:13; 3rd	34:30; 10th	1:50:47	9th
Yolexy Rodriguez	Individual	19:25; 24th	0:27; 31st	56:48; 7th	0:17; 21st	36:06; 17th	1:53:03	17th

=== Women ===
Athlete	Event	Swim (1.5 km)	Trans 1	Bike (40 km)	Trans 2	Run (10 km)	Total	Rank
Maydelin Justo	Individual	20:48; 17th	0:26; 8th	LAP				

== Volleyball ==
Men

Team

- Dariel Albo
- Yenry Bell
- Rolando Cepeda
- Yoandry Diaz
- Yulian Duran
- Yosniel Guillen
- Keibel Gutiérrez
- Fernando Hernandez
- Raydel Hierrezuelo
- Wilfredo Leon
- Isbel Mesa
- Yassel Perdomo

Standings

Pos	Team	Pld	W	L	Pts	SPW	SPL	SPR	SW	SL	SR	Qualification
1	Cuba	3	3	0	13	257	224	1.147	9	2	4.500	Semifinals
2	Argentina	3	2	1	8	331	331	1.000	8	7	1.143	Quarterfinals
3	Mexico	3	1	2	6	271	278	0.975	5	7	0.714	Quarterfinals
4	Venezuela	3	0	3	3	266	292	0.911	3	9	0.333	

Results

Date		Score		Set 1	Set 2	Set 3	Set 4	Set 5	Total	Report
Oct 24	Cuba	3–2	Argentina	25–22	18–25	24–26	25–18	15–13	107–104	Report
Oct 25	Cuba	3–0	Venezuela	25–20	25–21	25–17			75–58	Report
Oct 26	Cuba	3–0	Mexico	25–18	25–21	25–23			75–62	Report

Semifinals

Date		Score		Set 1	Set 2	Set 3	Set 4	Set 5	Total	Report
Oct 28	Cuba	3–2	Mexico	25–21	25–27	28–30	25–15	17–15	120–108	Report

Gold medal match

Date		Score		Set 1	Set 2	Set 3	Set 4	Set 5	Total	Report
Oct 29	Brazil	3–1	Cuba	25–11	24–26	25–18	25–19		99–74	Report

2011 Pan American Games Silver Medal

Cuba

Women

Team

- Emily Borrell
- Kenia Carcaces
- Leanny Castaneda
- Ana Cleger
- Rosanna Giel
- Daymara Lescay
- Yoana Palacios
- Alena Rojas
- Wilma Salas
- Yanelys Santos
- Yusidey Silié
- Gyselle Silva

Standings

Pos	Team	Pld	W	L	Pts	SPW	SPL	SPR	SW	SL	SR	Qualification
1	Brazil	3	3	0	13	267	212	1.259	9	2	4.500	Semifinals
2	Cuba	3	2	1	10	259	236	1.097	7	4	1.750	Quarterfinals
3	Dominican Republic	3	1	2	5	283	304	0.931	5	8	0.625	Quarterfinals
4	Canada	3	0	3	2	209	266	0.786	2	9	0.222	

Results

Date		Score		Set 1	Set 2	Set 3	Set 4	Set 5	Total	Report
Oct 15	Cuba	3–0	Canada	25–22	25–16	25–18			75–56	Report
Oct 16	Cuba	3–1	Dominican Republic	25–23	21–25	25–20	25–16		96–84	Report
Oct 17	Brazil	3–1	Cuba	25–23	21–25	25–22	25–18		96–88	Report

Quarterfinals

Date		Score		Set 1	Set 2	Set 3	Set 4	Set 5	Total	Report
Oct 18	Cuba	3–0	Peru	25–18	25–19	26–24			76–61	Report

Semifinals

Date		Score		Set 1	Set 2	Set 3	Set 4	Set 5	Total	Report
Oct 19	United States	1–3	Cuba	17–25	16–25	27–25	21–25		81–100	Report

Gold medal match

Date		Score		Set 1	Set 2	Set 3	Set 4	Set 5	Total	Report
Oct 20	Cuba	2–3	Brazil	15–25	25–21	21–25	25–21	10–15	96–107	

2011 Pan American Games Silver Medal

Cuba

== Water polo ==
Men

Team

- Yohandri Andrade
- Giraldo Carales
- Raydel Carales
- Ernesto Cisneros
- Rudy Despaigne
- Rasiel Gallo
- Iosse Gonzalez
- Yarbul Gonzalez
- Rigel Jimenez
- Edgar Lara
- Gianny Lara
- Emilio Oms
- Jhonasy Rivas

Qualified for the semifinals

Standings

Team	GP	W	D	L	GF	GA	GD	Pts
Canada	3	3	0	0	46	21	+25	6
Cuba	3	2	0	1	30	33	-3	4
Mexico	3	1	0	2	24	35	-11	2
Colombia	3	0	0	3	29	40	-11	0

Results

October 23, 2011; 17:00	Report	Colombia	11–12	Cuba	Scotiabank Aquatics Center, Guadalajara; Referees: Valcarce (ARG), Werner (BRA)
October 23, 2011; 17:00	Report	Score by quarters: 2–2, 3–3, 4 – 5, 2–2			Scotiabank Aquatics Center, Guadalajara; Referees: Valcarce (ARG), Werner (BRA)
October 23, 2011; 17:00	Report	Idarraga 3	Goals	Cisneros 5	Scotiabank Aquatics Center, Guadalajara; Referees: Valcarce (ARG), Werner (BRA)

October 24, 2011; 15:46	Report	Canada	15–10	Cuba	Scotiabank Aquatics Center, Guadalajara; Referees: Parades (COL), Stampalija (CRO)
October 24, 2011; 15:46	Report	Score by quarters: 4 – 3, 4–4, 3 – 1, 4 – 2			Scotiabank Aquatics Center, Guadalajara; Referees: Parades (COL), Stampalija (CRO)
October 24, 2011; 15:46	Report	Graham, Constantin 4	Goals	3 players 2	Scotiabank Aquatics Center, Guadalajara; Referees: Parades (COL), Stampalija (CRO)

October 25, 2011; 18:15	Report	Mexico	7–8	Cuba	Scotiabank Aquatics Center, Guadalajara; Attendance: Werner (BRA), Arnoldo (VEN)
October 25, 2011; 18:15	Report	Score by quarters: 2 – 3, 2 – 1, 1–1, 2 – 3			Scotiabank Aquatics Center, Guadalajara; Attendance: Werner (BRA), Arnoldo (VEN)
October 25, 2011; 18:15	Report	O'Brien Jr. 3	Goals	Jimenez, Cisneros 2	Scotiabank Aquatics Center, Guadalajara; Attendance: Werner (BRA), Arnoldo (VEN)

Semifinals

October 27, 2011; 15:30	Report	Cuba	2–12	United States	Scotiabank Aquatics Center, Guadalajara; Referees: Bohm (AHO), Stampalija (CRO)
October 27, 2011; 15:30	Report	Score by quarters: 0 – 4, 0 – 2, 2–2, 0 – 4			Scotiabank Aquatics Center, Guadalajara; Referees: Bohm (AHO), Stampalija (CRO)
October 27, 2011; 15:30	Report	Jimenez 2	Goals	Powers 3	Scotiabank Aquatics Center, Guadalajara; Referees: Bohm (AHO), Stampalija (CRO)

Bronze medal match

October 29, 2011; 15:30	Report	Brazil	14–7	Cuba	Scotiabank Aquatics Center, Guadalajara; Referees: Bohm (AHO), Valcarce (ARG)
October 29, 2011; 15:30	Report	Score by quarters: 4–4, 3 – 0, 2 – 3, 5 – 0			Scotiabank Aquatics Center, Guadalajara; Referees: Bohm (AHO), Valcarce (ARG)
October 29, 2011; 15:30	Report	Rocha 3	Goals	Rivas 4	Scotiabank Aquatics Center, Guadalajara; Referees: Bohm (AHO), Valcarce (ARG)

2011 Pan American Games 4th

Cuba

Women

Team

- Mayelin Bernal
- Yeliana Bravo
- Danay Gutierrez
- Leynais Gutierrez
- Hirovis Hernandez
- Yanet Lopez
- Daryana Morales
- Yadira Oms
- Yordanka Pujol
- Arisney Ramos
- Lisbeth Santana
- Neldys Truffin
- Mairelys Zunzunegui

Qualified for the semifinals

Standings

Team	GP	W	D	L	GF	GA	GD	Pts
United States	3	3	0	0	63	7	+56	6
Cuba	3	2	0	1	22	36	-12	4
Puerto Rico	3	1	0	2	28	43	-15	2
Argentina	3	0	0	3	11	38	-27	0

Results

October 23, 2011; 9:45	Report	Puerto Rico	12–13	Cuba	Scotiabank Aquatics Center, Guadalajara; Referees: Burt (CAN), Arnoldo (VEN)
October 23, 2011; 9:45	Report	Score by quarters: 4–4, 2 – 3, 3 – 2, 3 – 4			Scotiabank Aquatics Center, Guadalajara; Referees: Burt (CAN), Arnoldo (VEN)
October 23, 2011; 9:45	Report	Medina 4	Goals	Hernandez, Gutierrez 3	Scotiabank Aquatics Center, Guadalajara; Referees: Burt (CAN), Arnoldo (VEN)

October 24, 2011; 8:30	Report	Argentina	5–6	Cuba	Scotiabank Aquatics Center, Guadalajara; Referees: Dykman (CAN), Callejas (MEX)
October 24, 2011; 8:30	Report	Score by quarters: 0 – 2, 2 – 1, 2 – 1, 1 – 2			Scotiabank Aquatics Center, Guadalajara; Referees: Dykman (CAN), Callejas (MEX)
October 24, 2011; 8:30	Report	Font 2	Goals	Bernal 2	Scotiabank Aquatics Center, Guadalajara; Referees: Dykman (CAN), Callejas (MEX)

October 25, 2011; 12:15	Report	United States	19–3	Cuba	Scotiabank Aquatics Center, Guadalajara; Referees: Lopez (COL), Paredes (VEN)
October 25, 2011; 12:15	Report	Score by quarters: 5 – 0, 4 – 1, 3 – 1, 7 – 1			Scotiabank Aquatics Center, Guadalajara; Referees: Lopez (COL), Paredes (VEN)
October 25, 2011; 12:15	Report	Seidemann 5	Goals	3 players, 1	Scotiabank Aquatics Center, Guadalajara; Referees: Lopez (COL), Paredes (VEN)

Semifinals

October 26, 2011; 17:00	Report	Cuba	9–15	Canada	Scotiabank Aquatics Center, Guadalajara; Referees: Valcarce (ARG), Bohm (AHO)
October 26, 2011; 17:00	Report	Score by quarters: 2 – 4, 1 – 4, 3 – 2, 3 – 5			Scotiabank Aquatics Center, Guadalajara; Referees: Valcarce (ARG), Bohm (AHO)
October 26, 2011; 17:00	Report	Hernandez 6	Goals	Radu 4	Scotiabank Aquatics Center, Guadalajara; Referees: Valcarce (ARG), Bohm (AHO)

Bronze medal match

October 28, 2011; 15:30	Report	Brazil	9–8	Cuba	Scotiabank Aquatics Center, Guadalajara; Referees: Bohm (AHO), Moller (ARG)
October 28, 2011; 15:30	Report	Score by quarters: 2 – 1, 1 – 2, 4 – 3, 2–2			Scotiabank Aquatics Center, Guadalajara; Referees: Bohm (AHO), Moller (ARG)
October 28, 2011; 15:30	Report	Canetti, Oliveira 3	Goals	Gutierrez 3	Scotiabank Aquatics Center, Guadalajara; Referees: Bohm (AHO), Moller (ARG)

2011 Pan American Games 4th

Cuba

== Weightlifting ==
Athlete	Event	Snatch			Clean & Jerk			Total	Rank
Athlete	Event	Attempt 1	Attempt 2	Attempt 3	Attempt 1	Attempt 2	Attempt 3	Total	Rank
Sergio Alvarez	Men's 56 kg	115	~~119~~	119	148	~~152~~	---	267	1st place, gold medalist(s)
Bredni Roque	Men's 69 kg	133	~~138~~	138	171	~~176~~	~~176~~	309	4th
Iván Cambar	Men's 77 kg	146	150	~~153~~	182	186	188	338	1st place, gold medalist(s)
Yoelmis Hernández	Men's 85 kg	150	155	158	195	200	205 =PR	363 =PR	1st place, gold medalist(s)
Javier Enrique Vanega	Men's 94 kg	160	165	170	195	200	---	370	1st place, gold medalist(s)
Alejandro Cisneros	Men's 105 kg	160	165	~~167~~	197	202	~~205~~	367	4th
Sertanis Teran	Men's +105 kg	168	174	~~180~~	205	212	215	389	5th
Idalmis Rivera	Women's 69 kg	78	83	~~86~~	106	111	~~114~~	194	8th
Odeysis Pelegrin	Women's 75 kg	~~83~~	~~83~~	83	105	110	~~116~~	193	5th

== Wrestling ==
Cuba has qualified six athletes in the 55 kg, 60 kg, 66 kg, 74 kg, 96 kg, and 120 kg men's freestyle categories, seven athletes in the 55 kg, 60 kg, 66 kg, 74 kg, 84 kg, 96 kg, and 120 kg men's Greco-Roman categories, and two athletes in the 63 kg and 72 kg women's freestyle categories.

Men

Freestyle

Athlete	Event	Round of 16	Quarterfinals	Semifinals	Final
Athlete	Event	Opposition Result	Opposition Result	Opposition Result	Opposition Result
Yowlys Bonne	60 kg	Wilfredo Henriquez (VEN); W PP 3 – 1	Rayley Walker (CAN); W PP 3 – 1	Franklin Gómez (PUR); L PO 0 – 3	Bronze medal match: Gabriel Garcia Sanchez (DOM); W PP 3 – 1 (bronze)
Liván López	66 kg		Edison Hurtado (COL); W VT 5 – 0	Teyon Vincent Ware (USA); W PP 3 – 1	Pedro Soto (PUR); W PO 3 – 0 (gold)
Yunierki Blanco	74 kg		Eduardo Valencia (MEX); W PP 3 – 1	Matthew Judah Gentry (CAN); W PO 3 – 0	Jordan Ernest Burroughs (USA); L PP 1 – 3 (silver)
Humberto Daniel Arencibia	84 kg		Jeffrey Adamson (CAN); W PP 3 – 1	Adrian Antoine Jaoude (BRA); W PO 3 – 0	Jacob John Herbert (USA); L PP 1 – 3 (silver)
Michel Antonio Batista	96 kg		Khetag Pliev (CAN); L PP 1 – 3	did not advance	
Disney Rodriguez	120 kg		Jesse Prudente Ruiz (MEX); W PO 3 – 0	Tervel Ivaylov Dlagnev (USA); L PO 0 – 3	Bronze medal match: Carlos Julio Delgado (COL); W VT 5 – 0 (bronze)

Greco-Roman

Athlete	Event	Round of 16	Quarterfinals	Semifinals	Final
Athlete	Event	Opposition Result	Opposition Result	Opposition Result	Opposition Result
Gustavo Eddy Balart	55 kg		Alberto Mendieta (NCA); W PO 3 – 0	Juan Carlos López (COL); W PO 3 – 0	Jorge Cardozo (VEN); W PP 3 – 1 (gold)
Hanser Lenier Meoque	60 kg		Diego Romanelli (BRA); W PO 3 – 0	Luis Liendo (VEN); L P9 1 – 3	Bronze medal match: Yesid Alfredo Meneses (COL); W PO 3 – 0 (bronze)
Pedro Isaac Mulens	66 kg	Vicente Orlando Huacon (ECU); W PP 3 – 1	Shawn Kenneth Daye (CAN); W PO 3 – 0	Glenn Russell Garrison (USA); W PO 3 – 0	Anyelo Mota (DOM); W PO 3 – 0 (gold)
Jorgisbell Alvarez	74 kg		Juan Ángel Escobar (MEX); W PO 3 – 0	José Uber Escobar (COL); W PP 3 – 1	Benjamin Errol Provisor (USA); W PP 3 – 1 (gold)
Pablo Enrique Shorey	84 kg		José Antonio Mendoza (MEX); W PO 3 – 0	José Antonio Arias Paredes (DOM); W PP 3 – 1	Cristian Ferney Mosquera (COL); W PO 3 – 0 (gold)
Yunior Estrada	96 kg		Erwin Caraballo (VEN); W PP 3 – 1	Panaglotys Gounaridis (USA); W PO 3 – 0	Raul Andres Angulo (COL); W ST 4 – 0 (gold)
Mijaín López	120 kg		Orlando Ramirez (MEX); W VT 5 – 0	Ramon Antonio Garcia Garcia (DOM); W PO 3 – 0	Rafael Barreno (VEN); W ST 4 – 0 (gold)

Women

Freestyle

Athlete	Event	Quarterfinals	Semifinals	Final
Athlete	Event	Opposition Result	Opposition Result	Opposition Result
Katerina Vidiaux	63 kg	Vanessa Torres Batista (DOM); W PO 3 – 0	Luz Clara Vazquez (ARG); W VT 5 – 0	Elena Sergey Pirozhkov (USA); W VT 5 – 0 (gold)
Lisset Hechevarria	72 kg		Jaramit Weffer (VEN); W PO 3 – 0	Aline Ferreira (BRA); W PP 3 – 1 (gold)
