= Canoeing at the 2011 Pan American Games – Men's K-4 1000 metres =

Men's K-4 1000 metres at the 2011 Pan American Games
- Venue: Canoe & Rowing Course
- Dates: October 27
- Competitors: 32 from 8 nations

Medalists
Gold medal	Osvaldo Labrada; Reinier Torres; Jorge García; Maikel Zulueta	Cuba
Silver medal	Steven Jorens; Richard Dessureault-Dober; Connor Taras; Philippe Duchesneau	Canada
Bronze medal	Roberto Maheler; Givago Ribeiro; Gilvan Ribeiro; Celso De Oliveira Junior	Brazil

The men's K-4 1000 metres canoeing event at the 2011 Pan American Games was held on October 27 at the Canoe & Rowing Course in Ciudad Guzman.

== Schedule ==
All times are local Central Daylight Time (UTC−5)

Date	Time	Round
October 27, 2011	10:00	Final

== Results ==
=== Final ===
Rank	Rowers	Country	Time	Notes
1st place, gold medalist(s)	Osvaldo Labrada, Jorge García, Reinier Torres, Maikel Zulueta	Cuba	3:01.061	
2nd place, silver medalist(s)	Richard Dessureault-Dober, Philippe Duchesneau, Steven Jorens, Connor Taras	Canada	3:02.653	
3rd place, bronze medalist(s)	Celso De Oliveira Junior, Roberto Maehler, Gilvan Ribeiro, Givago Ribeiro	Brazil	3:02.821	
4	Jesus Valdez, Manuel Cortina, Osbaldo Fuentes, Agustin Medinilla	Mexico	3:03.438	
5	Roberto Geringer Sallette, Juan Pablo Bergero, Daniel Dal Bo, Pablo de Torres	Argentina	3:04.471	
6	Ray Acuña, Jesus Colmenares, José Ramos, Jhonson Vergara	Venezuela	3:05.996	
7	Patrick Dolan, Jacob Michael, William House, Luke Michael	United States	3:09.127	
8	Victor Baron, Yojan Cano, Leocadio Pinto, Jimmy Urrego	Colombia	3:12.911	
