= Canoeing at the 2011 Pan American Games – Men's K-2 1000 metres =

Men's K-2 1000 metres at the 2011 Pan American Games
- Venue: Canoe & Rowing Course
- Dates: October 28
- Competitors: 16 from 8 nations

Medalists
| Gold medal | Steven Jorens; Richard Dessureault-Dober | Canada |
| Silver medal | Reinier Torres; Jorge García | Cuba |
| Bronze medal | Pablo Martín de Torres; Roberto Geringer Sallette | Argentina |

The men's K-2 1000 metres canoeing event at the 2011 Pan American Games was held on October 28 at the Canoe & Rowing Course in Ciudad Guzman.

== Schedule ==
All times are local Central Daylight Time (UTC−5)

| Date | Time | Round |
|---|---|---|
| October 28, 2011 | 11:00 | Final |

== Results ==
=== Final ===
| Rank | Rowers | Country | Time | Notes |
|---|---|---|---|---|
| 1st place, gold medalist(s) | Richard Dessureault-Dober, Steven Jorens | Canada | 3:17.230 | |
| 2nd place, silver medalist(s) | Jorge García, Reinier Torres | Cuba | 3:19.158 | |
| 3rd place, bronze medalist(s) | Pablo de Torres, Roberto Geringer Sallette | Argentina | 3:19.599 | |
| 4 | Celso De Oliveira Junior, Roberto Maheler | Brazil | 3:19.959 | |
| 5 | Osbaldo Fuentes, Javier López | Mexico | 3:22.350 | |
| 6 | Yojan Cano, Leocadio Pinto | Colombia | 3:28.988 | |
| 7 | Jacob Michael, Luke Michael | United States | 3:30.577 | |
| 8 | Richard Giron, Kevin Rivas | Guatemala | 3:48.713 | |
