= Canoeing at the 2015 Pan American Games – Men's K-1 1000 metres =

Men's K-1 1000 metres at the 2015 Pan American Games
- Venue: Welland Pan Am Flatwater Centre
- Dates: July 13
- Competitors: 8 from 8 nations
- Winning time: 3:40.990

Medalists
Gold medal	Jorge García	Cuba
Silver medal	Daniel Dal Bo	Argentina
Bronze medal	Adam van Koeverden	Canada

The men's K-1 1000 metres canoeing event at the 2015 Pan American Games will be held between the 11 and 13 of July at the Welland Pan Am Flatwater Centre in Welland.

== Schedule ==
The following is the competition schedule for the event:

All times are Eastern Daylight Time (UTC−4)

Date	Time	Round
July 13, 2015	9:34	Final

== Results ==
=== Final ===
Rank	Athletes	Country	Time	Notes
1st place, gold medalist(s)	Jorge García	Cuba	3:40.990	
2nd place, silver medalist(s)	Daniel Dal Bo	Argentina	3:42.019	
3rd place, bronze medalist(s)	Adam van Koeverden	Canada	3:43.055	
4	Jordan Salazar	Mexico	3:44.552	
5	Celso Dias De Oliveira Junior	Brazil	3:48.329	
6	Sebastián Romero	Uruguay	3:54.601	
7	Yojan Cano	Colombia	4:06.113	
8	Edvin Buc Solorzano	Guatemala	4:06.288	
