= Richard Dessureault-Dober =

Canadian canoeist

Medal record

Men's canoe sprint

World Championships
Silver medal – second place	2006 Szeged	K-2 500 m
Bronze medal – third place	2009 Dartmouth	K-2 200 m

Pan American Games
Gold medal – first place	2011 Guadalajara	K-2 1000 metres
Silver medal – second place	2011 Guadalajara	K-4 1000 metres

Richard Dessureault-Dober, Jr. (born January 21, 1981) is a Canadian sprint kayaker who has competed since the mid-2000s. He won two medals at the ICF Canoe Sprint World Championships with a silver (K-2 500 m: 2006) and a bronze (K-2 200 m: 2009).

Dessureault-Dober, Jr. also competed in two Summer Olympics, earning his best finish of sixth in the K-2 500 m event at Beijing in 2008.
