= Canoeing at the 2011 Pan American Games – Men's K-1 1000 metres =

Men's K-1 1000 metres at the 2011 Pan American Games
- Venue: Canoe & Rowing Course
- Dates: October 28
- Competitors: 9 from 9 nations

Medalists
Gold medal	Jorge García	Cuba
Silver medal	Daniel Dal Bo	Argentina
Bronze medal	Philippe Duchesneau	Canada

The men's K-1 1000 metres canoeing event at the 2011 Pan American Games was held on October 28 at the Canoe & Rowing Course in Ciudad Guzman.

== Schedule ==
All times are local Central Daylight Time (UTC−5)

Date	Time	Round
October 28, 2011	9:30	Final

== Results ==
=== Final ===
Rank	Rowers	Country	Time	Notes
1st place, gold medalist(s)	Jorge García	Cuba	3:41.257	
2nd place, silver medalist(s)	Daniel Dal Bo	Argentina	3:43.038	
3rd place, bronze medalist(s)	Philippe Duchesneau	Canada	3:44.504	
4	Michel Ferreira	Brazil	3:44.640	
5	Leocadio Pinto	Colombia	3:46.667	
6	William House	United States	3:48.065	
7	Jesús Váldez	Mexico	3:48.449	
8	Ray Acuña	Venezuela	3:55.810	
9	Edgar Padro	Puerto Rico	4:33.289	
