= Rowing at the 2011 Pan American Games – Women's lightweight single sculls =

Rowing – Women's l.wght single sculls at the 2011 Pan American Games
- Venue: Canoe & Rowing Course
- Dates: October 16 – October 19
- Competitors: 8 from 8 nations

Medalists
| Gold medal | Jennifer Goldsack | United States |
| Silver medal | Fabiana Beltrame | Brazil |
| Bronze medal | Yaima Velazquez | Cuba |

The women's lightweight single sculls rowing event at the 2011 Pan American Games will be held from October 16–19 at the Canoe & Rowing Course in Ciudad Guzman. This event was not held at the 2007 Pan American Games in Rio de Janeiro, Brazil.

== Schedule ==
All times are Central Standard Time (UTC-6).

| Date | Time | Round |
|---|---|---|
| October 16, 2011 | 10:20 | Heats |
| October 16, 2011 | 16:30 | Repechage |
| October 19, 2011 | 9:46 | Final B |
| October 19, 2011 | 9:56 | Final A |

== Results ==
=== Heat 1 ===
| Rank | Rowers | Country | Time | Notes |
|---|---|---|---|---|
| 1 | Yaima Velazquez | Cuba | 8:24.13 | FA |
| 2 | Lila Perez Rul | Mexico | 8:38.52 | R |
| 3 | Marta Figueroa | El Salvador | 8:45.22 | R |
| 4 | Claudia Caballero | Peru | 9:41.20 | R |

=== Heat 2 ===
| Rank | Rowers | Country | Time | Notes |
|---|---|---|---|---|
| 1 | Fabiana Beltrame | Brazil | 8:20.18 | FA |
| 2 | Jennifer Goldsack | United States | 8:25.32 | R |
| 3 | Deborah Lince | Argentina | 8:48.33 | R |
| 4 | Gabriela Mosqueira | Paraguay | 8:48.83 | R |

=== Repechage ===
| Rank | Rowers | Country | Time | Notes |
|---|---|---|---|---|
| 1 | Jennifer Goldsack | United States | 8:02.48 | FA |
| 2 | Gabriela Mosqueira | Paraguay | 8:09.09 | FA |
| 3 | Deborah Lince | Argentina | 8:11.15 | FA |
| 4 | Marta Figueroa | El Salvador | 8:12.62 | FA |
| 5 | Lila Perez Rul | Mexico | 8:12.73 | FB |
| 6 | Claudia Caballero | Peru | 8:35.37 | FB |

=== Final B ===
| Rank | Rowers | Country | Time | Notes |
|---|---|---|---|---|
| 7 | Lila Perez Rul | Mexico | 8:20.34 | |
| 8 | Claudia Caballero | Peru | 8:26.80 | |

=== Final A ===
| Rank | Rowers | Country | Time | Notes |
|---|---|---|---|---|
| 1st place, gold medalist(s) | Jennifer Goldsack | United States | 7:48.77 | |
| 2nd place, silver medalist(s) | Fabiana Beltrame | Brazil | 7:55.42 | |
| 3rd place, bronze medalist(s) | Yaima Velazquez | Cuba | 8:02.59 | |
| 4 | Gabriela Mosqueira | Paraguay | 8:07.14 | |
| 5 | Deborah Lince | Argentina | 8:07.63 | |
| 6 | Marta Figueroa | El Salvador | 8:15.91 | |
