= Canoeing at the 2011 Pan American Games – Men's C-1 200 metres =

Men's C-1 200 metres at the 2011 Pan American Games
- Venue: Canoe & Rowing Course
- Dates: October 27–29
- Competitors: 10 from 10 nations

Medalists
Gold medal	Richard Dalton	Canada
Silver medal	Nivalter De Jesus	Brazil
Bronze medal	Roleysi Baez	Cuba

The men's C-1 200 metres canoeing event at the 2011 Pan American Games was held on October 27–29 at the Canoe & Rowing Course in Ciudad Guzman.

== Schedule ==
All times are local Central Daylight Time (UTC−5)

Date	Time	Round
October 27, 2011	12:05	Heats
October 27, 2011	13:15	Semifinal
October 29, 2011	9:30	Final

== Results ==
=== Heats ===
Qualification Rules: 1..3->Final, 4..7 and 8th best time->Semifinals, Rest Out

==== Heat 1 ====
Rank	Athletes	Country	Time	Notes
1	Nivalter Jesus	Brazil	40.449	QF
2	Andres Lazo	Ecuador	41.703	QF
3	Álvaro Torres	Chile	41.945	QF
4	Alejandro Royo	Mexico	42.222	QS
5	Robert Finlayson	United States	43.931	QS

==== Heat 2 ====
Rank	Athletes	Country	Time	Notes
1	Richard Dalton	Canada	40.249	QF
2	Roleysi Baez	Cuba	41.291	QF
3	Ronny Ratia	Venezuela	41.607	QF
4	Carlos Escamilla	Colombia	43.169	QS
5	Leonardo Niveiro	Argentina	46.572	QS

=== Semifinal ===
Qualification Rules: 1..3->Final, Rest Out

Rank	Athletes	Country	Time	Notes
1	Alejandro Royo	Mexico	42.223	QF
2	Robert Finlayson	United States	43.078	QF
3	Carlos Escamilla	Colombia	43.590	QF
4	Leonardo Niveiro	Argentina	46.125	

=== Final ===
Rank	Athletes	Country	Time	Notes
1st place, gold medalist(s)	Richard Dalton	Canada	40.333	
2nd place, silver medalist(s)	Nivalter Jesus	Brazil	40.619	
3rd place, bronze medalist(s)	Roleysi Baez	Cuba	41.403	
4	Ronny Ratia	Venezuela	42.205	
5	Álvaro Torres	Chile	42.402	
6	Andres Lazo	Ecuador	42.653	
7	Alejandro Royo	Mexico	42.671	
8	Robert Finlayson	United States	44.239	
9	Carlos Escamilla	Colombia	44.372	
