= Diving at the 2011 Pan American Games – Men's synchronized 3 metre springboard =

Men's synchronized 3 metre platform at the 2011 Pan American Games
- Venue: Scotiabank Aquatics Center
- Dates: October 26
- Competitors: 16 from 8 nations

Medalists
Gold medal	Yahel Castillo; Julián Sánchez	Mexico
Silver medal	Troy Dumais; Kristian Ipsen	United States
Bronze medal	Rene Hernandez; Jorge Luis Pupo	Cuba

The men's synchronized 3 metre platform competition of the diving events at the 2011 Pan American Games was held on October 26 at the Scotiabank Aquatics Center. The defending Pan American Games champion were Troy Dumais and Mitch Richeson of the United States.

The synchronized diving competitions all consist of one rounds. All teams compete in a single round of six dives.

Eleven judges evaluate each dive, three each for each individual diver, and five for the synchronization, giving the diver/dive a score between 0 and 10 with increments of 0.5. The highest and lowest scores from each judge for each individual diver and the highest and lowest scores for synchronization are dropped. The remaining five scores are added together and multiplied by the degree of difficulty to get the raw score. The raw score is then multiplied by 0.6 to get the final score for the dive.

== Schedule ==
All times are Central Daylight Time (UTC-5).

Day	Date	Start	Phase
Day 13	October 26	19:30	Finals

== Results ==
The final round was held on October 26.

Rank	Divers	Nationality	Points
1st place, gold medalist(s)	Yahel Castillo; Julián Sánchez	Mexico	457.32
2nd place, silver medalist(s)	Troy Dumais; Kristian Ipsen	United States	411.99
3rd place, bronze medalist(s)	Rene Hernandez; Jorge Luis Pupo	Cuba	384.33
4	César Castro; Ian Matos	Brazil	377.79
5	Víctor Ortega; Sebastian Villa	Colombia	375.03
6	Reuben Ross; Eric Sehn	Canada	360.99
7	Emilio Colmenarez; Robert Paez	Venezuela	345.57
8	Diego Carquin; Donato Neglia	Chile	317.04
