= Athletics at the 2011 Pan American Games – Women's triple jump =

Women's triple jump at the 2011 Pan American Games
- Venue: Telmex Athletics Stadium
- Dates: October 28
- Competitors: 15 from 11 nations
- Winning distance: 14.92

Medalists
Gold medal	Caterine Ibargüen	Colombia
Silver medal	Yargelis Savigne	Cuba
Bronze medal	Mabel Gay	Cuba

The women's triple jump event of the athletics events at the 2011 Pan American Games was held the 28 of October at the Telmex Athletics Stadium. The defending Pan American Games champion is Yargelis Savigne of the Cuba.

== Records ==
Prior to this competition, the existing world and Pan American Games records were as follows:

World record	Inessa Kravets (UKR)	15.50	Gothenburg, Sweden	August 10, 1995
Pan American Games record	Yargelis Savigne (CUB)	14.80	Rio de Janeiro, Brazil	July 27, 2007

== Qualification ==
Each National Olympic Committee (NOC) was able to enter up to two entrants providing they had met the minimum standard (13.00) in the qualifying period (January 1, 2010 to September 14, 2011).

== Schedule ==
Date	Time	Round
October 28, 2011	16:50	Final

== Results ==
All distances shown are in meters:centimeters

KEY:	q	Fastest non-qualifiers	Q	Qualified	NR	National record	PB	Personal best	SB	Seasonal best

=== Final ===
The final was held on October 28.

Rank	Athlete	Nationality	#1	#2	#3	#4	#5	#6	Result	Notes
1st place, gold medalist(s)	Caterine Ibargüen	Colombia	14.80	14.49	14.75	x	14.73	14.92	14.92	GR
2nd place, silver medalist(s)	Yargelis Savigne	Cuba	14.10	x	14.36	13.19	13.90	x	14.36	
3rd place, bronze medalist(s)	Mabel Gay	Cuba	13.47	14.08	14.28	x	14.23	14.24	14.28	
4	Keila Costa	Brazil	13.77	13.85	13.89	13.89	14.01	13.93	14.01	
5	Ayanna Alexander	Trinidad and Tobago	13.48	13.54	13.40	13.53	13.02	13.43	13.54	
6	Crystal Manning	United States	13.53	x	x	13.18	12.99	x	13.53	
7	Yvette Lewis	United States	12.84	x	13.17	12.89	12.99	–	13.17	
8	Aidé Yesenia Villareal	Mexico	x	x	12.92	13.06	12.77	12.66	13.06	
9	Estefany Cruz	Guatemala	12.83	x	12.86				12.86	
10	Ana José	Dominican Republic	12.69	12.69	12.80				12.80	
11	Mayra Pachito	Ecuador	12.74	12.30	x				12.74	
12	Jaqueline Triana	Mexico	x	12.58	x				12.58	
13	Pascale Delaunay	Haiti	x	12.30	12.41				12.41	
14	Kay-De Vaughn	Belize	x	11.49	11.64				11.64	
15	Ana Camargo	Guatemala	x	x	11.59				11.59	
