= Basque pelota at the 2011 Pan American Games =

- Venue: Basque Pelota Complex
- Dates: October 21 – October 27
- Competitors: 100 from 11 nations

Basque pelota at the 2011 Pan American Games in Guadalajara, were held over a six-day period from October 21 to October 27. The events took place at the Basque Pelota Complex in Guadalajara.

== Medal summary ==
=== Medal table ===
* Host nation (Mexico)

Rank	Nation	Gold	Silver	Bronze	Total
1	Mexico*	5	2	2	9
2	Argentina	4	0	3	7
3	Cuba	1	3	4	8
4	Uruguay	0	3	0	3
5	United States	0	2	1	3
Totals (5 entries)		10	10	10	30

=== Men's events ===
Event	Gold	Silver	Bronze
Paleta Rubber Pairs Trinkete	Argentina; Facundo Andreasen; Sergio Villegas	Uruguay; Enzo Cazzola; Carlos Buzzo	Mexico; Adrian Raya; Guillermo Verdeja
Paleta Leather Pairs Trinkete	Argentina; Cristian Andrés Algarbe; Jorge Villegas	Uruguay; Pablo Baldizan; Gaston Dufau	Cuba; Frendy Fernandez; Anderson Jardines
Mano Singles Trinkete	Heriberto López; Mexico	Darien Povea; Cuba	Roger Etchevers; United States
Paleta Leather Pairs 36m Fronton	Cuba; Rafael Fernández; Azuan Perez	Mexico; Rodrigo Ledesma; Francisco Javier Mendiburu	Argentina; Luciano Callarelli; Carlos Dorato
Mano Singles 36m Fronton	Fernando Medina; Mexico	Roberto Huarte; United States	Henrry Despaigne; Cuba
Mano Doubles 36m Fronton	Mexico; Jorge Alberto Alcantara; Orlando Diaz	United States; Jose Huarte; Tony Huarte	Cuba; Dariel Leiva; Ruben Moya
Paleta Rubber Pairs 30m Fronton	Argentina; Fernando Gabriel Ergueta; Javier Alejandro Nicosia	Mexico; Jesus Homero Hurtado; Daniel Salvador Rodriguez	Cuba; Jose Noel Fiffe; Jhoan Luis Torreblanca
Frontenis Pairs 30m Fronton	Mexico; Alberto Miguel Rodriguez; Arturo Rodríguez	Cuba; Daniel Alonso; Cesar Rafael Arocha	Argentina; Jorge Maximiliano Alberdi; Alexis Emanuel Clementín

=== Women's events ===
Event	Gold	Silver	Bronze
Paleta Rubber Pairs Trinkete	Argentina; María Lis García; Verónica Andrea Stele	Uruguay; Maria Jimena Miranda; Camila Naviliat	Mexico; Ariana Yolanda Cepeda; Rocio Guillen
Frontenis Pairs 30m Fronton	Mexico; Paulina Castillo; Guadalupe Maria Hernandez	Cuba; Lisandra Lima; Yasmary De La Caridad Medina	Argentina; Irina Podversich; Johanna Stefanía Zair

== Qualification ==
The top five nations in each event (top ten for the Paleta Leather Pairs 30m Fronton) at the 2010 World Championships in Pau, France qualified for the Pan American Games.
