= Rowing at the 2011 Pan American Games – Men's lightweight coxless four =

Rowing – Men's l.weight coxless four at the 2011 Pan American Games
- Venue: Canoe & Rowing Course
- Dates: October 16 - October 19
- Competitors: 36 from 9 nations

Medalists
Gold medal	Wilber Turro; Liosbel Hernandez; Liosmel Ramos; Manuel Suarez	Cuba
Silver medal	Nicolai Fernandez; Diego Gallina; Carlo Lauro; Pablo Mahnic	Argentina
Bronze medal	Félipe Leal; Fernando Miralles; Rodrigo Muñoz; Fabian Oyarzun	Chile

The men's lightweight coxless four rowing event at the 2011 Pan American Games will be held from October 16–19 at the Canoe & Rowing Course in Ciudad Guzman. The defending Pan American Games champion is Adam Reynolds, Andrew Borden, John Haver, Paul Amesbury of Canada.

== Schedule ==
All times are Central Standard Time (UTC-6).

Date	Time	Round
October 16, 2011	9:00	Heats
October 16, 2011	16:00	Repechages
October 19, 2011	9:30	Final B
October 19, 2011	9:38	Final A

== Results ==
=== Heats ===
==== Heat 1 ====
Rank	Rowers	Country	Time	Notes
1	Nicolai Fernandez, Diego Gallina, Carlo Lauro, Pablo Mahnic	Argentina	6:06.62	FA
2	Jose Arriaga, Juan Jimenez, Saul Garcia, Omar Lopez	Mexico	6:06.67	FA
3	Wilber Turro, Liosbel Hernandez, Liosmel Ramos, Manuel Suarez	Cuba	6:07.25	R
4	Robert Milam, Ryan Kirlin, Frank Petrucci, Joshua Gautreau	United States	6:33.93	R
5	Andres Mora, Irving Calles, Jose Fernandez, Agustin Betancourt	Venezuela	6:42.68	R

==== Heat 2 ====
Rank	Rowers	Country	Time	Notes
1	Félipe Leal, Fernando Miralles, Rodrigo Muñoz, Fabian Oyarzun	Chile	6:13.97	FA
2	Travis King, Derek Vinge, Eric Woelfl, Terence McKall	Canada	6:17.61	FA
3	Celio Amorim, Thiago Almeida, Ailson Silva, Jose Sobral	Brazil	6:25.15	R
4	Juan Guevara, Oscar Maeda, Leif Catalan, Herman Garcia	Guatemala	6:29.06	R

=== Repechage ===
Rank	Rowers	Country	Time	Notes
1	Wilber Turro, Liosbel Hernandez, Liosmel Ramos, Manuel Suarez	Cuba	6:21.05	FA
2	Celio Amorim, Thiago Almeida, Ailson Silva, Jose Sobral	Brazil	6:22.27	FA
3	Robert Milam, Ryan Kirlin, Frank Petrucci, Joshua Gautreau	United States	6:27.79	FB
4	Juan Guevara, Oscar Maeda, Leif Catalan, Herman Garcia	Guatemala	6:30.04	FB
5	Andres Mora, Irving Calles, Jose Fernandez, Agustin Betancourt	Venezuela	6:45.23	FB

=== Final B ===
Rank	Rowers	Country	Time	Notes
7	Robert Milam, Ryan Kirlin, Frank Petrucci, Joshua Gautreau	United States	6:18.62	
8	Juan Guevara, Oscar Maeda, Leif Catalan, Herman Garcia	Guatemala	6:21.59	
9	Andres Mora, Irving Calles, Jose Fernandez, Agustin Betancourt	Venezuela	6:37.90	

=== Final A ===
Rank	Rowers	Country	Time	Notes
1st place, gold medalist(s)	Wilber Turro, Liosbel Hernandez, Liosmel Ramos, Manuel Suarez	Cuba	6:06.06	
2nd place, silver medalist(s)	Nicolai Fernandez, Diego Gallina, Carlo Lauro, Pablo Mahnic	Argentina	6:06.21	
3rd place, bronze medalist(s)	Félipe Leal, Fernando Miralles, Rodrigo Muñoz, Fabian Oyarzun	Chile	6:06.36	
4	Jose Arriaga, Juan Jimenez, Saul Garcia, Omar Lopez	Mexico	6:09.96	
5	Travis King, Derek Vinge, Eric Woelfl, Terence McKall	Canada	6:13.53	
6	Celio Amorim, Thiago Almeida, Ailson Silva, Jose Sobral	Brazil	6:15.61	
