= Canoeing at the 2011 Pan American Games – Men's C-1 1000 metres =

Men's C-1 1000 metres at the 2011 Pan American Games
- Venue: Canoe & Rowing Course
- Dates: October 28
- Competitors: 9 from 9 nations

Medalists
Gold medal	Everardo Cristóbal	Mexico
Silver medal	Reydel Ramos	Cuba
Bronze medal	Johnnathan Tafra	Chile

The men's C-1 1000 metres canoeing event at the 2011 Pan American Games was held on October 28 at the Canoe & Rowing Course in Ciudad Guzman.

== Schedule ==
All times are local Central Daylight Time (UTC−5)

Date	Time	Round
October 28, 2011	9:45	Final

== Results ==
=== Final ===
Rank	Rowers	Country	Time	Notes
1st place, gold medalist(s)	Everardo Cristóbal	Mexico	4:03.288	
2nd place, silver medalist(s)	Reydel Ramos	Cuba	4:03.973	
3rd place, bronze medalist(s)	Johnnathan Tafra	Chile	4:05.323	
4	Edwar Paredes	Venezuela	4:13.569	
5	Sergio Díaz	Colombia	4:25.805	
6	Robert Finlayson	United States	4:34.301	
7	Leonardo Niveiro	Argentina	4:45.499	
	Wladimir Moreno	Brazil	DSQ	
	Roland Varga	Canada	DSQ	
