= Jennifer Goldsack =

American rower (born 1982)

Jennifer Goldsack OLY
Personal information
- National team: United States
- Citizenship: United States; United Kingdom
- Born: July 12, 1982 (age 44) Wimbledon, London, Great Britain

Sport
- Sport: Rowing
Medal record
Representing United States
World Rowing Championships
Silver medal – second place	2007 Munich	LW1x
Pan American Games
Gold medal – first place	2011 Guadalajara	Lwt single sculls

Jennifer Carroll Goldsack (born July 12, 1982) is an American rower. She competed at the 2008 Summer Olympics in the Women's Lightweight Double Sculls, and studied at Somerville College, Oxford.

Goldsack has a dual citizenship with the United States and the United Kingdom.
