= Wrestling at the 2011 Pan American Games – Men's freestyle 84 kg =

Men's Freestyle 84 kg at the 2011 Pan American Games
- Venue: CODE II Gymnasium
- Dates: October 23
- Competitors: 8 from 8 nations

Medalists
| Gold medal | Jake Herbert | United States |
| Silver medal | Humberto Arencibia | Cuba |
| Bronze medal | Jeffrey Adamson | Canada |
| Bronze medal | Jose Diaz | Venezuela |

The Men's freestyle 84 kg competition of the wrestling events at the 2011 Pan American Games in Guadalajara, Mexico, was held on October 23 at the CODE II Gymanasium. The defending champion was Roozbeh Banihashemi from Canada.

This freestyle wrestling competition consisted of a single-elimination tournament, with a repechage used to determine the winner of two bronze medals. The two finalists faced off for gold and silver medals. Each wrestler who lost to one of the two finalists moved into the repechage, culminating in a pair of bronze medal matches featuring the semifinal losers each facing the remaining repechage opponent from their half of the bracket.

Each bout consisted of up to three rounds, lasting two minutes apiece. The wrestler who scored more points in each round was the winner of that rounds; the bout finished when one wrestler had won two rounds (and thus the match).

== Schedule ==
All times are Central Standard Time (UTC-6).

| Date | Time | Round |
|---|---|---|
| October 23, 2011 | 10:00 | Quarterfinals |
| October 23, 2011 | 11:04 | Semifinals |
| October 23, 2011 | 18:32 | Bronze medal matches |
| October 23, 2011 | 18:40 | Final |

== Results ==
=== Finals round ===
Quarterfinals
Humberto Arencibia (CUB) | 1 | 3
Jeffrey Adamson (CAN) | 0 | 1
Adrian Jaoude (BRA) | 6
Roberto Espinoza (PAN) | 0
Jake Herbert (USA) | 3 | 2
Jaime Espinal (PUR) | 2 | 0
Jose Diaz (VEN) | 2 | 6
Alejandro Gallardo (MEX) | 0 | 0

Semifinals
Humberto Arencibia (CUB) | 1 | 1
Adrian Jaoude (BRA) | 0 | 0
Jake Herbert (USA) | 1 | 2
Jose Diaz (VEN) | 0 | 1

Finals
Humberto Arencibia (CUB) | 0 | 3
Jake Herbert (USA) | 1 | 4

=== Repechage round ===
Two bronze medals were awarded.

| Repechage round 1 | Bronze Medal Bout |
| | Adrian Jaoude (BRA) | 1 0 0 |
| Jeffrey Adamson (CAN) | Jeffrey Adamson (CAN) | 0 1 6 |
| Bye |

| Repechage round 1 | Bronze Medal Bout |
| | Jose Diaz (VEN) | 1 0 1 |
| Jaime Espinal (PUR) | Jaime Espinal (PUR) | 0 1 1 |
| Bye |
