= Connor Taras =

Canadian kayaker

Personal information
- Born: 1989 (age 36–37) Waverley, Nova Scotia, Canada

Sport
- Sport: Canoeing
Medal record
Representing Canada
Pan American Games
Silver medal – second place	2011 Guadalajara	K4 1000m

Connor Taras is a Canadian sport kayaker from Waverley, Nova Scotia, who was a silver medalist with the Canadian Men's K-4 1000 metres team at the 2011 Pan American Games. He also competed in the Men's K-1 200 metres, finishing sixth. In the 2025 Ontario general election, Taras was the Ontario Liberal Party candidate for the riding of Toronto—Danforth (provincial electoral district).

== Education and career ==
Taras was educated at Mount Saint Vincent University, studying marketing.

He tried out for the Canadian kayaking team for the 2012 Summer Olympics, but missed qualifying by 0.6 seconds. After struggling with his sexual orientation for a number of years, Taras began coming out as gay to friends and family in 2013. According to Taras, the freedom to be open about his sexual orientation made him a better athlete; in the same year, he successfully shaved a full 12 seconds off his personal best time.

In 2015, Taras announced his retirement from competitive sport. He served as coordinator of ceremonies for the 2015 Pan American Games in Toronto, Ontario, and is an ambassador for the Canadian Olympic Committee's OneTeam initiative to combat homophobia in sports.
