= Steven Jorens =

Canadian canoeist

Personal information
- Born: 5 October 1981 (age 44) Aurora, Ontario, Canada

Sport
- Sport: Canoeing
Medal record
Men's canoe sprint
Representing Canada
Pan American Games
Gold medal – first place	2011 Guadalajara	K-2 1000 metres
Silver medal – second place	2011 Guadalajara	K-4 1000 metres

Steven Jorens (born October 5, 1981) is a Canadian sprint canoer from Aurora, Ontario, who has competed since 1998. Jorens' home club is Richmond Hill Canoe Club, situated on Lake Wilcox, in Richmond Hill, Ontario. Competing in the 2004 and 2008 Summer Olympics, he earned his best finish of ninth in the K-4 1000 m event at Athens in 2004.
