= Wrestling at the 2011 Pan American Games – Men's Greco-Roman 74 kg =

Men's Greco–Roman 74 kg at the 2011 Pan American Games
- Venue: CODE II Gymnasium
- Dates: October 20
- Competitors: 8 from 8 nations

Medalists
Gold medal	Jorgisbell Alvarez; Cuba
Silver medal	Ben Provisor; United States
Bronze medal	Joel Lopez Escobar; Mexico
Bronze medal	Hansel Mercedes; Dominican Republic

The men's Greco–Roman 74 kg competition of the wrestling events at the 2011 Pan American Games in Guadalajara, Mexico, was held on October 21 at the CODE II Gymanasium. The defending champion was Odelis Herrero from Cuba.

This Greco-Roman wrestling competition consists of a single-elimination tournament, with a repechage used to determine the winner of two bronze medals. The two finalists face off for gold and silver medals. Each wrestler who loses to one of the two finalists moves into the repechage, culminating in a pair of bronze medal matches featuring the semifinal losers each facing the remaining repechage opponent from their half of the bracket.

Each bout consists of up to three rounds, lasting two minutes apiece. The wrestler who scores more points in each round is the winner of that rounds; the bout ends when one wrestler has won two rounds (and thus the match).

== Schedule ==
All times are Central Standard Time (UTC-6).

Date	Time	Round
October 21, 2011	10:08	Qualification
October 21, 2011	10:48	Preliminary bouts
October 21, 2011	18:16	Bronze medal matches
October 21, 2011	18:24	Final

== Results ==
=== Main bracket ===
Quarterfinals
Juan Escobar (MEX)	0	0
Jorgisbell Alvarez (CUB)	1	3
Otoniel Perez (PUR)	0	0
Jose Uber Escobar (COL)	6	2
Ben Provisor (USA)	2	1
Elton Brown (PAN)	0	0
Hansel Mercedes (DOM)	3	2
Sixto Barrera (PER)	0	0

Semifinals
Jorgisbell Alvarez (CUB)	0	4	1
Jose Uber Escobar (COL)	1	0	0
Ben Provisor (USA)	1	1
Hansel Mercedes (DOM)	0	0

Finals
Jorgisbell Alvarez (CUB)	1	2	2
Ben Provisor (USA)	0	3	0

=== Repechage round ===
Two bronze medals were awarded.

Repechage round 1	Bronze Medal Bout
Joel Lopez Escobar (MEX)
Bye	Jose Uber Escobar (COL)	1
	Joel Lopez Escobar (MEX)	3

Repechage round 1	Bronze Medal Bout
Elton Brown (PAN)
Bye	Hansel Mercedes (DOM)	1 2
	Elton Brown (PAN)	0 2
