= Canoeing at the 2011 Pan American Games – Men's K-1 200 metres =

Men's K-1 200 metres at the 2011 Pan American Games
- Venue: Canoe & Rowing Course
- Dates: October 27–29
- Competitors: 12 from 12 nations

Medalists
Gold medal	César de Cesare	Ecuador
Silver medal	Miguel Correa	Argentina
Bronze medal	Ryan Dolan	United States

The men's K-1 200 metres canoeing event at the 2011 Pan American Games was held on October 27–29 at the Canoe & Rowing Course in Ciudad Guzman.

== Schedule ==
All times are local Central Daylight Time (UTC−5)

Date	Time	Round
October 27, 2011	11:15	Heats
October 27, 2011	13:05	Semifinal
October 29, 2011	9:15	Final

== Results ==
=== Heats ===
Qualification Rules: 1..3->Final, 4..7 and 8th best time->Semifinals, Rest Out

==== Heat 1 ====
Rank	Athletes	Country	Time	Notes
1	Connor Taras	Canada	36.445	QF
2	Reinier Mora	Cuba	36.560	QF
3	Jhonson Vergara	Venezuela	37.378	QF
4	Edson da Silva	Brazil	37.771	QS
5	Jimmy Urrego	Colombia	38.881	QS
6	Richard Giron	Guatemala	40.086	QS

==== Heat 2 ====
Rank	Athletes	Country	Time	Notes
1	César de Cesare	Ecuador	35.796	QF
2	Ryan Dolan	United States	36.397	QF
3	Miguel Correa	Argentina	37.300	QF
4	Manuel Cortina	Mexico	39.275	QS
5	Krishna Angueira	Puerto Rico	40.195	QS
6	Satyam Maharaj	Trinidad and Tobago	51.371	QS

=== Semifinal ===
Qualification Rules: 1..3->Final, Rest Out

Rank	Athletes	Country	Time	Notes
1	Edson da Silva	Brazil	36.146	QF
2	Manuel Cortina	Mexico	36.919	QF
3	Jimmy Urrego	Colombia	38.686	QF
4	Richard Giron	Guatemala	38.858	
5	Krishna Angueira	Puerto Rico	38.960	
6	Satyam Maharaj	Trinidad and Tobago	49.285	

=== Final ===
Rank	Rowers	Country	Time	Notes
1st place, gold medalist(s)	César de Cesare	Ecuador	35.971	
2nd place, silver medalist(s)	Miguel Correa	Argentina	36.349	
3rd place, bronze medalist(s)	Ryan Dolan	United States	36.547	
4	Reinier Mora	Cuba	36.686	
5	Edson da Silva	Brazil	36.691	
6	Connor Taras	Canada	36.766	
7	Manuel Cortina	Mexico	37.199	
8	Jhonson Vergara	Venezuela	37.393	
9	Jimmy Urrego	Colombia	39.305	
