= Jorgisbell Álvarez =

Cuban Greco-Roman wrestler

Personal information
- Full name: Jorgisbel Álvarez Hernández
- Nationality: Cuba
- Born: 8 February 1985 (age 41)
- Weight: 74 kg (163 lb)

Sport
- Sport: Wrestling
- Event: Greco-Roman
Medal record
Men's Greco-Roman wrestling
Representing Cuba
Pan American Games
Gold medal – first place	2011 Guadalajara	74 kg

Jorgisbel Álvarez Hernández (born 8 February 1985) is an amateur Cuban Greco-Roman wrestler, who played for the men's middleweight category. He defeated U.S. wrestler Ben Provisor for the gold medal in his division at the 2011 Pan American Games in Guadalajara, Mexico.

He qualified for the 2012 Summer Olympics in London by winning the Pan American qualification tournament but was replaced by Alexei Bell.
