= Humberto Arencibia =

Cuban freestyle wrestler

Personal information
- Full name: Humberto Daniel Arencibia; Martinez
- Born: 20 November 1989 (age 36) Pinar del Río, Cuba
- Weight: 84 kg (185 lb)

Sport
- Sport: Wrestling
- Event: Freestyle
- Coached by: Julio Mendieta
Medal record
Men's freestyle wrestling
Representing Cuba
Pan American Games
Silver medal – second place	2011 Guadalajara	84 kg

Humberto Daniel Arencibia Martinez (born November 20, 1989, in Pinar del Río) is an amateur Cuban freestyle wrestler, who competes in the men's light heavyweight category. He won a silver medal for his division at the 2011 Pan American Games in Guadalajara, Mexico.

Arencibia represented Cuba at the 2012 Summer Olympics in London, where he competed in the men's 84 kg class. He received a bye for the preliminary round of sixteen match, before losing out to U.S. wrestler and Pan American Games champion Jake Herbert, with a three-set technical score (4–1, 0–8, 1–1), and a classification point score of 1–3.
