= Annia Rivera =

Cuban Olympic diver

Personal information
- Nationality: Cuba
- Born: 13 August 1991 (age 34) Santiago de Cuba, Cuba

Sport
- Sport: Diving
- Event: 10m Platform
Medal record
Women's diving
Representing Cuba
Pan American Games
Bronze medal – third place	2011 Guadalajara	10m Platform Synchronized
- Updated on 17 September 2012

Annia Rivera (born 13 August 1991) is a Cuban diver. She competed in the 10 metre platform event at the 2012 Summer Olympics.
