= Jorge Luis Pupo =

Cuban diver (born 1982)

Personal information
- Nationality: Cuba
- Born: 14 February 1982 (age 44) Pinar del Río, Cuba
- Height: 1.66 m (5 ft 5 1/2 in)
- Weight: 63 kg (139 lb)

Sport
- Sport: Diving
- Event: Springboard
- Partner: Rene Hernandez
Medal record
Men's diving
Representing Cuba
Pan American Games
| Bronze medal – third place | 2011 Guadalajara | Springboard synchro |

Jorge Luis Pupo (born February 14, 1982, in Pinar del Río) is a Cuban diver, who specialized in individual and synchronized springboard events. Pupo competed for the 3 m individual springboard event at the 2008 Summer Olympics in Beijing, along with his compatriot Jorge Betancourt. He placed twenty-seventh in the preliminary round of the competition, with a total score of 388.70 points. In 2011, Pupo, and his partner Rene Hernandez won a bronze medal for the men's 3 m synchronized springboard event at the Pan American Games in Guadalajara, Mexico, with an overall score of 384.33 points.
