= Daniel Dal Bo =

Argentine sprint canoeist

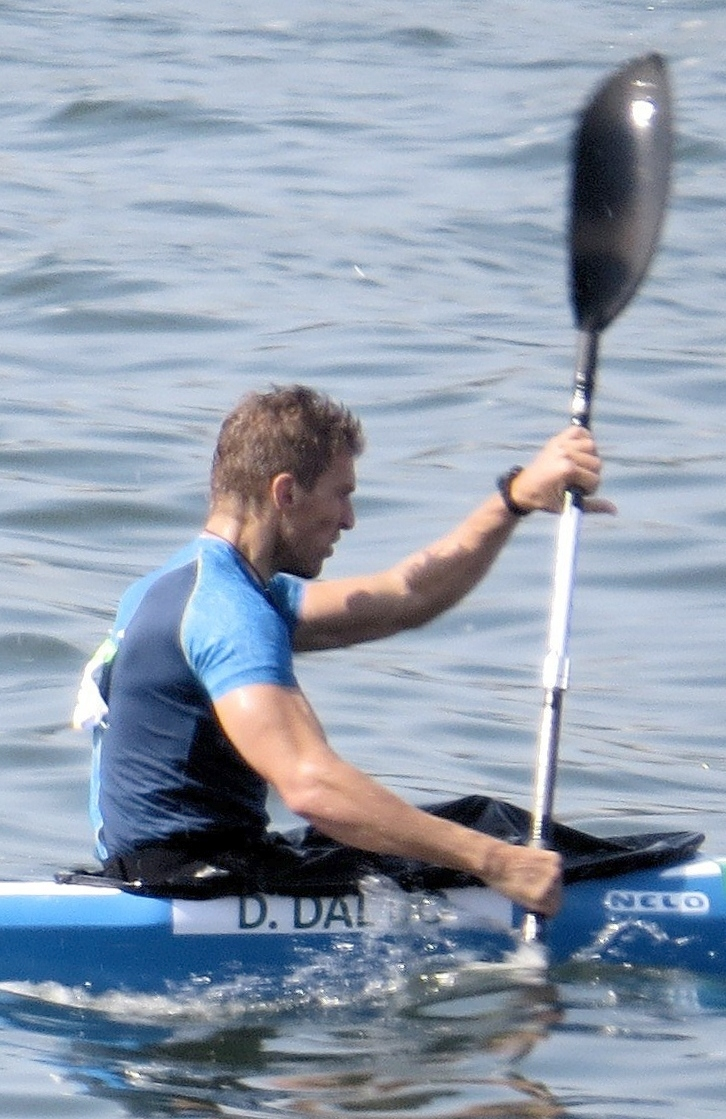
- Bo at the 2016 Olympics

Personal information
- Born: 8 September 1987 (age 39)
- Height: 185 cm (6 ft 1 in)
- Weight: 78 kg (172 lb)

Sport
- Sport: Canoe sprint
- Coached by: Diego Canepa
Medal record
Representing Argentina
World championships
Silver medal – second place	2013 Dusiburg	K-1 500 m
Pan American Games
Silver medal – second place	2011 Guadalajara	K-1 1000 m
Silver medal – second place	2015 Toronto	K-1 1000 m
Bronze medal – third place	2015 Toronto	K-4 1000 m

Daniel Dal Bo (born 8 September 1987) is an Argentine sprint canoeist who won individual silver medals at the 2013 World Championships and at the 2011 and 2015 Pan American Games. His four-man team placed 12th in the K-4 1000 m event at the 2016 Summer Olympics.
