= Diamela Puentes =

Cuban softball player

Personal information
- Nationality: Cuban
- Born: 5 January 1981
- Died: 9 March 2024 (aged 43)

Sport
- Sport: Softball

Diamela Puentes (5 January 1981 – 9 March 2024) was a Cuban softball player. She competed in the women's tournament at the 2000 Summer Olympics.
