= Jorge García (canoeist) =

Cuban canoeist (born 1988)

Personal information
- Born: 14 January 1988 (age 38) Caibarién, Cuba

Sport
- Sport: Canoeing
Medal record
Representing Cuba
Central American and Caribbean Games
Gold medal – first place	2006 Cartagena	K-2 1000 m
Gold medal – first place	2006 Cartagena	K-4 1000 m
Pan American Games
Gold medal – first place	2011 Guadalajara	K-1 1000 m
Gold medal – first place	2015 Toronto	K-1 1000 m
Gold medal – first place	2015 Toronto	K-2 1000 m
Gold medal – first place	2015 Toronto	K-4 1000 m
Silver medal – second place	2007 Rio de Janeiro	K-2 500 m
Bronze medal – third place	2007 Rio de Janeiro	K-1 1000 m
Bronze medal – third place	2007 Rio de Janeiro	K-4 1000 m

Jorge Antonio García Rodríguez (born January 14, 1988) is a Cuban sprint canoer who competed in the late 2000s. At the 2008 Summer Olympics in Beijing, he was eliminated in the semifinals of both the K-1 500 m and the K-1 1000 m events. At the 2012 Summer Olympics he competed in the K-1 1000 m, winning the B-final. At the 2016 Summer Olympics, he competed with Reinier Torres in the men's K-2 1000 m.
