= Chronological summary of the 2015 Pan American Games =

This article contains a chronological summary of the events from the 2015 Pan American Games in Toronto, Ontario, Canada.

== Scheduling changes ==
The aquatics events were scheduled to be held roughly around the same time as the 2015 World Aquatics Championships scheduled in Kazan, Russia. The Organizing Committee's goal is to have the best athletes competing at the Games and thus the schedule for the five aquatics disciplines had to be changed to accommodate athletes. The synchronized swimming competition actually was moved to the day before the opening ceremony, diving events began on the day of the opening ceremony (when events are traditionally not held on the day of the ceremony), open water swimming was moved to the first weekend of the games, swimming was reduced to a five-day schedule (down from seven in Guadalajara, Mexico), and water polo competitions began three days before the opening ceremony. All events were scheduled to be completed by July 24, six days before the opening ceremonies of the World Championships, which in itself was moved back a week to accommodate the games. The change in schedule meant that for the first time ever, events were held before the opening ceremony.

The 2015 World Archery Championships were scheduled later in July, not to conflict with the games, while the 2015 World Fencing Championships, which would finish the day before the fencing competitions begin, would have events coordinated to allow athletes to compete at both events. Finally, the second round of the 2015 Davis Cup was moved ahead one week not to conflict with the tennis competitions. Tennis competitions also began before the opening ceremony, to allow athletes to compete in both events.

== Calendar ==
In the following calendar for the 2015 Pan American Games, each blue box represents an event competition, such as a qualification round, on that day. The yellow boxes represent days during which medal-awarding finals for a sport are held. The number in each box represents the number of finals that will be contested on that day.

OC	Opening ceremony	●	Event competitions	1	Event finals	CC	Closing ceremony

July		7 Tue	8 Wed	9 Thu	10 Fri	11 Sat	12 Sun	13 Mon	14 Tue	15 Wed	16 Thu	17 Fri	18 Sat	19 Sun	20 Mon	21 Tue	22 Wed	23 Thu	24 Fri	25 Sat	26 Sun	Events
Ceremonies (opening / closing)					OC																CC	—N/a
Aquatics
Aquatics	Diving				●	2	2	4														8
Aquatics	Open water swimming					1	1															2
Aquatics	Swimming								6	7	5	8	6									32
Aquatics	Synchronized swimming			●		2																2
Aquatics	Water polo	●	●	●		●	●	●	1	1												2
Archery									●	●	●	2	2									4
Athletics													1	2		9	8	8	10	8	1	47
Badminton						●	●	●	●	2	3											5
Baseball						●	●	●	●	●	●	●	●	1	●	●	●	●	●	●	1	2
Basketball											●	●	●	●	1	●	●	●	●	1		2
Beach volleyball								●	●	●	●	●	●	●	●	2						2
Bowling																	●	2	●	2		4
Boxing													●	●	●	●	●	●	6	7		13
Canoeing	Slalom												●	5								5
Canoeing	Sprint					1	1	5	6													13
Cycling	BMX				●	2																2
Cycling	Mountain biking						2															2
Cycling	Road																2			2		4
Cycling	Track										3	2	2	3								10
Equestrian	Dressage					●	1		1													2
Equestrian	Eventing											●	●	2								2
Equestrian	Jumping															●		1		1		2
Fencing															2	2	2	2	2	2		12
Field hockey								●	●	●	●	●	●		●	●	●	●	1	1		2
Football						●	●	●	●	●	●	●	●	●	●	●	●	●	●	1	1	2
Golf											●	●	●	3								3
Gymnastics	Artistic					1	1	2	5	5												14
Gymnastics	Rhythmic											●	2	3	3							8
Gymnastics	Trampoline												●	2								2
Handball											●	●	●	●	●	●	●	●	1	1		2
Judo						3	3	4	4													14
Karate																		3	3	4		10
Modern pentathlon													1	1								2
Racquetball														●	●	●	●	●	4	●	2	6
Roller sports						●	4	4														8
Rowing						●	●	4	5	5												14
Rugby sevens						●	2															2
Sailing							●	●	●	●	●	●	5	5								10
Shooting							2	3	1	2	1	2	2	2								15
Softball							●	●	●	●	●	●	1	●	●	●	●	●	●	●	1	2
Squash						●	●	2	2	●	●	2										6
Table tennis														●	●	2	●	●	●	2		4
Taekwondo														2	2	2	2					8
Tennis					●	●	●	●	●	3	2											5
Triathlon						1	1															2
Volleyball											●	●	●	●	●	●	●	●	●	1	1	2
Water skiing															●	●	3	6				9
Weightlifting						3	3	3	3	3												15
Wrestling										4	5	5	4									18
Total events						16	23	31	34	32	19	21	26	31	8	17	17	22	27	33	7	364
Cumulative total						16	39	70	104	136	155	176	202	233	241	258	275	297	324	357	364	—N/a
July		7 Tue	8 Wed	9 Thu	10 Fri	11 Sat	12 Sun	13 Mon	14 Tue	15 Wed	16 Thu	17 Fri	18 Sat	19 Sun	20 Mon	21 Tue	22 Wed	23 Thu	24 Fri	25 Sat	26 Sun	Events

== Medal table ==
* Host nation (Canada)

Rank	NOC	Gold	Silver	Bronze	Total
1	United States	103	82	80	265
2	Canada*	78	70	71	219
3	Brazil	42	39	60	141
4	Cuba	36	27	34	97
5	Colombia	27	14	31	72
6	Mexico	22	30	43	95
7	Argentina	15	29	30	74
8	Venezuela	8	22	20	50
9	Ecuador	7	9	16	32
10	Guatemala	6	1	3	10
11–31	Remaining NOCs	22	39	69	130
Totals (31 entries)		366	362	457	1,185

== Day (–3) – Tuesday 7 July 2015 ==
The first competitions of the Games took place.

7 July 2015 — detailed results

Water polo

- Men's tournament: First day of Preliminaries
  - Group A: United States 27–0 Ecuador
  - Group B: Venezuela 9–9 Mexico
  - Group B: Canada 9–11 Brazil
- Women's tournament: First day of Preliminaries
  - Group A: Mexico 3–25 United States
  - Group B: Venezuela 11–11 Puerto Rico
  - Group B: Canada 7–7 Brazil

== Day (–2) – Wednesday 8 July 2015 ==
8 July 2015 — detailed results

Water polo

- Men's tournament: Second day of Preliminaries
  - Group A: Ecuador 8–21 Argentina
  - Group A: United States 21–4 Cuba
  - Group B: Venezuela 2–22 Brazil
- Women's tournament: Second day of Preliminaries
  - Group A: Mexico 8–10 Argentina
  - Group A: United States 18–3 Cuba
  - Group B: Venezuela 4–15 Canada

== Day (–1) – Thursday 9 July 2015 ==
9 July 2015 — detailed results

Synchronized swimming

- Women's duet: Technical routine
- Women's team: Technical routine

Water polo

- Men's tournament: Third day of Preliminaries
  - Group A: Cuba 7–7 Argentina
  - Group B: Brazil 22–9 Mexico
  - Group B: Venezuela 2–16 Canada
- Women's tournament: Third day of Preliminaries
  - Group A: Cuba 10–3 Argentina
  - Group B: Venezuela 1–18 Brazil
  - Group B: Canada 19–3 Puerto Rico

== Day 0 – Friday 10 July 2015 ==
10 July 2015 — detailed results

Cycling

- Men's BMX: Time trials
- Women's BMX: Time trials

Diving

- Men's 3 metre springboard: Preliminaries
- Women's 10 metre platform: Preliminaries

Tennis

- Men's singles: First Round

Opening ceremony

- The opening ceremony of the 2015 Pan American Games took place on Friday July 10, 2015, beginning at 8:00 p.m. EDT at the Pan-Am Dome.

== Day 1 – Saturday 11 July 2015 ==
=== Detailed results (day 1) ===
11 July 2015 — detailed results

Badminton

- Round of 64 for Men's singles and Women's singles, Round of 32 for all five events.

Baseball

- Men's tournament: First day of Preliminaries
  - Colombia 3–10 Cuba
  - United States 9–10 Puerto Rico
  - Canada 4–1 Dominican Republic

Canoeing

- Women's K-4 500 metres: The gold was awarded to Canada with the time of 1:36.495, silver awarded to Cuba with the time of 1:37.665, bronze awarded to Argentina with the time of 1:37.721.

Cycling

- Men's BMX: In the final, Tory Nyhaug (Canada) won the gold with the time of 36.208, Alfredo Campo Vintimilla (Ecuador) finished second at the time of 36.501, Nicholas Long (USA) finished third at the time of 37.046.
- Women's BMX: In the final, Felicia Stancil (USA) won the gold with the time of 41.647, Doménica Azuero González (Ecuador) finished second at the time of 41.948, Mariana Diaz (Argentina) finished third at the time of 42.611.

Diving

- Men's 3 metre springboard: Rommel Pacheco (Mexico) awarded a total score of 483.35 to win gold, Jahir Ocampo (Mexico) awarded a silver with the total score of 442.15, Philippe Gagné (Canada) awarded a bronze with the total score of 421.10.
- Women's 10 metre platform: Paola Espinosa (Mexico) awarded a total score of 383.20 to win gold, Roseline Filion (Canada) awarded a silver with the total score of 377.60, Meaghan Benfeito (Canada) awarded a bronze with the total score of 357.45.

Equestrian

- Individual dressage: Grand Prix
- Team dressage: Grand Prix

Football

- Women's tournament: First day of First Round
  - Group A: Mexico 0–1 Colombia
  - Group A: Argentina 2–2 Trinidad and Tobago
  - Group B: Costa Rica 0–3 Brazil
  - Group B: Canada 5–2 Ecuador

Gymnastics

- Men's artistic team all-around: Team USA won the gold with the total score of 267.750, Brazil finished silver with the total score of 264.050, Colombia finished bronze with the total score of 259.300.

Judo

- Men's 60 kg:
  - Semi-final no. 1: Felipe Kitadai (BRA) defeated Yandry Torres Marimon (CUB)
  - Semi-final no. 2: Lenin Preciado (ECU) defeated Juan Postigos (PER)
  - Bronze Medal Match no. 1: (bronze) John Futtinico (COL) defeated Juan Postigos (PER)
  - Bronze Medal Match no. 2: (bronze) Yandry Torres Marimon (CUB) defeated Sérgio Pessoa (CAN)
  - Gold Medal Match: (gold) Lenin Preciado (ECU) defeated (silver) Felipe Kitadai (BRA)
- Women's 48 kg:
  - Semi-final no. 1: Paula Pareto (ARG) defeated Nathalia Brigida (BRA)
  - Semi-final no. 2: Dayaris Mestre Álvarez (CUB) defeated Edna Carrillo (MEX)
  - Bronze Medal Match no. 1: (bronze) Edna Carrillo (MEX) defeated Isandrina Sánchez (DOM)
  - Bronze Medal Match no. 2: (bronze) Nathalia Brigida (BRA) defeated Diana Cobos (ECU)
  - Gold Medal Match: (gold) Dayaris Mestre Álvarez (CUB) defeated (silver) Paula Pareto (ARG)
- Women's 52 kg:
  - Semi-final no. 1: Érika Miranda (BRA) defeated Diana Díaz (ECU)
  - Semi-final no. 2: Ecaterina Guica (CAN) defeated Angélica Delgado (USA)
  - Bronze Medal Match no. 1: (bronze) Angélica Delgado (USA) defeated María García (DOM)
  - Bronze Medal Match no. 2: (bronze) Gretter Romero (CUB) defeated Diana Díaz (ECU)
  - Gold Medal Match: (gold) Érika Miranda (BRA) defeated (silver) Ecaterina Guica (CAN)

Roller sports

- Men's free skating: Short program
- Women's free skating: Short program

Rowing

- Men's single sculls: Heats and Repechages
- Men's double sculls: Heats and Repechages
- Men's lightweight double sculls: Heats and Repechages
- Men's coxless four: Heats
- Women's double sculls: Heats
- Women's lightweight double sculls: Heats and Repechages
- Women's coxless pair: Heats

Rugby sevens

- Men's tournament: Preliminary round
  - Group A: United States 26–7 Chile
  - Group A: Uruguay 34–0 Mexico
  - Group A: United States 46–0 Mexico
  - Group A: Uruguay 20–17 Chile
  - Group A: Chile 38–0 Mexico
  - Group A: United States 52–0 Uruguay
  - Group B: Argentina 19–7 Brazil
  - Group B: Canada 45–0 Guyana
  - Group B: Argentina 41–0 Guyana
  - Group B: Canada 26–14 Brazil
  - Group B: Brazil 31–5 Guyana
  - Group B: Argentina 21–7 Canada
- Women's tournament: First day of Preliminary round
  - Pool Play: Canada 55–0 Colombia
  - Pool Play: United States 26–7 Brazil
  - Pool Play: Mexico 5–40 Argentina
  - Pool Play: United States 40–0 Colombia
  - Pool Play: Brazil 22–5 Argentina
  - Pool Play: Canada 60–0 Mexico
  - Pool Play: Argentina 7–54 United States
  - Pool Play: Canada 36–0 Brazil
  - Pool Play: Colombia 24–19 Mexico

Squash

- Men's singles: First Round and Second Round
- Women's singles: First Round

Swimming

- Women's marathon 10 kilometres: Eva Fabian (USA) won the marathon after the time of 2:03:17.0, Paola Perez Sierra (Venezuela) takes silver with the time of 2:03:17.0, Samantha Arévalo (Ecuador) takes bronze with the time of 2:03:17.1.

Synchronized swimming

- Women's duet: The gold was awarded to Canada (Jacqueline Simoneau and Karine Thomas) after being given a final score of 178.0881, Mexico (Karem Achach and Nuria Diosdado) was awarded a silver medal after a final score of 170.7800, USA (Mariya Koroleva and Alison Williams) finished third place after a final score of 166.3876.
- Women's team: Canada awarded gold after a final score of 178.1094, Mexico awarded silver after a final score of 172.5073, USA finished third after a final score of 166.0351.

Tennis

- Men's singles: Second round
- Men's doubles: First day of First round
- Women's singles: First day of First round

Triathlon

- Women's: Bárbara Riveros (Chile) finished gold with the time of 1:57:18, Paola Díaz (Mexico) finished silver with the time of 1:57:48, Flora Duffy (Bermuda) finished bronze with the time of 1:57:56.

Water polo

- Men's tournament: Fourth day of Preliminaries
  - Group A: United States 14–3 Argentina
  - Group A: Ecuador 3–10 Cuba
  - Group B: Mexico 9–19 Canada
- Women's tournament: Fourth day of Preliminaries
  - Group A: United States 30–3 Argentina
  - Group A: Mexico 9–11 Cuba
  - Group B: Brazil 17–10 Puerto Rico

Weightlifting

- Men's 56 kg: Habib de las Salas (Colombia) set a Pan American Games record of 152 kg in the clean and jerk and finished the gold with a score of 269 kg, Carlos Berna (Colombia) takes silver with a score of 265 kg, Luis García (Dominican Republic) takes bronze with a score of 256 kg.
- Men's 62 kg: Óscar Figueroa (Colombia) won the gold with a score of 310 kg, Francisco Mosquera (Colombia) takes silver with a score of 305 kg, Jesús Lopez (Venezuela) takes bronze with a score of 283 kg.
- Women's 48 kg: Cándida Vásquez (Dominican Republic) set a Pan American Games record of 81 kg in snatch and another Pan American Games record for a total score of 181 kg, to win gold. Ana Segura (Colombia) set a Pan American Games record of 103 kg in clean and jerk and also finished with a total score of 180 kg and thus was awarded the silver. Beatriz Pirón (Dominican Republic) takes bronze with a score of 175 kg.

=== Gold medalists (day 1) ===
11 July 2015 — Gold medalists

Sport	Event	Competitor(s)	NOC	Rec	Ref
Canoeing	Women's K-4 500 metres	Émilie Fournel; Kathleen Fraser; Michelle Russell; Hannah Vaughan	Canada		
Cycling	Men's BMX	Tory Nyhaug	Canada		
Cycling	Women's BMX	Felicia Stancil	United States		
Diving	Men's 3 metre springboard	Rommel Pacheco	Mexico		
Diving	Women's 10 metre platform	Paola Espinosa	Mexico		
Gymnastics	Men's artistic team all-around	Mavin Kimble; Steven Legendre; Samuel Mikulak; Paul Ruggeri; Donnell Whittenburg	United States		
Judo	Men's 60 kg	Lenin Preciado	Ecuador		
Judo	Women's 48 kg	Dayaris Mestre Álvarez	Cuba		
Judo	Women's 52 kg	Érika Miranda	Brazil		
Swimming	Women's marathon 10 kilometres	Eva Fabian	United States		
Synchronized swimming	Women's duet	Jacqueline Simoneau; Karine Thomas	Canada		
Synchronized swimming	Women's team	Jacqueline Simoneau; Karine Thomas; Gabriella Brisson; Annabelle Frappier; Claudia Holzner; Lisa Mikelberg; Marie-Lou Morin; Samantha Nealon; Lisa Sanders	Canada		
Triathlon	Women's	Bárbara Riveros Díaz	Chile		
Weightlifting	Men's 56 kg	Habib de las Salas	Colombia	GR	
Weightlifting	Men's 62 kg	Óscar Figueroa	Colombia		
Weightlifting	Women's 48 kg	Cándida Vásquez	Dominican Republic	GR	

== Day 2 – Sunday 12 July 2015 ==
=== Detailed results (day 2) ===
12 July 2015 — detailed results

Badminton

- Round of 16 for all five events.

Baseball

- Men's tournament: Second day of Preliminaries
  - Dominican Republic 8–5 Nicaragua
  - Canada 10–3 Colombia
  - United States 5–2 Cuba

Canoeing

- Men's K-4 1000 metres: Cuba awarded gold with the time of 3:01.744, silver awarded to Brazil with the time of 3:01.869, bronze awarded to Argentina with the time of 3:02.079.

Cycling

- Men's cross-country: Raphaël Gagné (Canada) crossed the finished line first with the time of 1:31:14, beating Catriel Soto (Argentina) time of 1:32:04. Stephen Ettinger (USA) was a third at 1:33:02.
- Women's cross-country: Emily Batty (Canada) finished first with the time of 1:27:13, Catharine Pendrel (Canada) finished second with the time of 1:27:20, Erin Huck (USA) finished third with the time of 1:32:36.

Diving

- Men's 10 metre platform: Iván García (Mexico) won gold with a total score of 521.70, Víctor Ortega (Colombia) takes silver with a total score of 455.15, Jonathan Ruvalcaba (Mexico) takes bronze with a total score of 437.35.
- Women's 3 metre springboard: Jennifer Abel (Canada) won gold with a total score of 384.70, Pamela Ware (Mexico) takes silver with a total score of 326.00, Dolores Hernández (Mexico) takes bronze with a total score of 323.10.

Equestrian

- Individual dressage: Grand Prix Special
- Team dressage: USA won gold with a total score of 460.506, Canada takes silver with a total score of 454.938, Brazil takes bronze with a total score of 414.895.

Football

- Men's tournament: First day of First round
  - Group A: Panama 2–1 Peru
  - Group A: Canada 1–4 Brazil

Gymnastics

- Women's artistic team all-around: USA won gold with the total score of 173.800, silver went to Canada with a total score of 166.500, bronze went to Brazil with a total score of 165.400.

Judo

- Men's 66 kg:
  - Semifinal no. 1: Charles Chibana (BRA) defeated Sergio Mattey (VEN)
  - Semifinal no. 2: Antoine Bouchard (CAN) defeated Carlos Tondique (CUB)
  - Bronze Medal Match no. 1: (bronze) Carlos Tondique (CUB) defeated Wander Mateo (DOM)
  - Bronze Medal Match no. 2: (bronze) Fernando Gonzalez (ARG) defeated Sergio Mattey (VEN)
  - Gold Medal Match: (gold) Charles Chibana (BRA) defeated (silver) Antoine Bouchard (CAN)
- Men's 73 kg:
  - Semifinal no. 1: Alejandro Clara (ARG) defeated Alex William Pombo Silva (BRA)
  - Semifinal no. 2: Magdiel Estrada (CUB) defeated Augusto Miranda (PUR)
  - Bronze Medal Match no. 1: (bronze) Augusto Miranda (PUR) defeated Fernando Ibañez (ECU)
  - Bronze Medal Match no. 2: (bronze) Arthur Margelidon (CAN) defeated Alex William Pombo Silva (BRA)
  - Gold Medal Match: (gold) Magdiel Estrada (CUB) defeated (silver) Alejandro Clara (ARG)
- Women's 57 kg:
  - Semifinal no. 1: Marti Malloy (USA) defeated Joselin Plaza (ECU)
  - Semifinal no. 2: Catherine Beauchemin-Pinard (CAN) defeated Rafaela Silva (BRA)
  - Bronze Medal Match no. 1: (bronze) Rafaela Silva (BRA) defeated Anriquelis Barrios (VEN)
  - Bronze Medal Match no. 2: (bronze) Aliuska Ojeda (CUB) defeated Joselin Plaza (ECU)
  - Gold Medal Match: (gold) Marti Malloy (USA) defeated (silver) Catherine Beauchemin-Pinard (CAN)

Roller sports

- Artistic
  - Men's free skating: Marcel Stürmer (Brazil) won the gold with the score of 536.00, John Burchfield (USA) takes silver with the score of 505.00, Diego Duque (Colombia) takes bronze with the score of 496.70.
  - Women's free skating: Giselle Soler (Argentina) won the gold with the score of 519.70, Talitha Haas (Brazil) takes silver with the score of 498.30, Marisol Villarroel (Chile) takes bronze with the score of 479.70.
- Speed
  - Men's 200 metres time-trial: Emanuelle Silva (Chile) won the gold with the time of 16.138, Pedro Causil (Colombia) takes silver with the time of 16.149, Jorge Martínez (Mexico) takes bronze with the time of 16.355.
  - Women's 200 metres time-trial: Hellen Montoya (Colombia) won the gold with the time of 17.653, Ingrid Factos (Ecuador) takes silver with the time of 17.994, María José Moya (Chile) takes bronze with the time of 18.042.

Rowing

- Men's quadruple sculls: Heats
- Men's coxless pair: Heats and Repechages
- Men's lightweight coxless four: Heats and Repechages
- Men's eight: Heats
- Women's single sculls: Heats and Repechages
- Women's lightweight single sculls: Heats and Repechages
- Women's quadruple sculls: Heats

Rugby sevens

- Men's tournament: Classification round and Medal round
  - Quarterfinals: United States 31–0 Guyana
  - Quarterfinals: Canada 17–12 Chile
  - Quarterfinals: Uruguay 12–5 Brazil
  - Quarterfinals: Argentina 53–0 Mexico
  - Fifth through Eighth places: Guyana 0–31 Chile
  - Fifth through Eighth places: Brazil 14–7 Mexico
  - Semifinals: United States 19–26 Canada
  - Semifinals: Uruguay 7–43 Argentina
  - Seventh place match: Guyana 26–22 Mexico
  - Fifth place match: Chile 12–7 Brazil
  - Bronze medal match: (bronze) United States 40–12 Uruguay
  - Gold medal match: (gold) Canada 22–19 Argentina (silver)
- Women's tournament: Second day of Preliminary round and Medal round
  - Pool Play: Argentina 0–45 Canada
  - Pool Play: Colombia 0–29 Brazil
  - Pool Play: Mexico 0–71 United States
  - Pool Play: Argentina 5–5 Colombia
  - Pool Play: Brazil 57–0 Mexico
  - Pool Play: Canada 34–12 United States
  - Fifth Place Game: Mexico 17–17 Colombia
  - Bronze Medal Game: (bronze) Brazil 29–0 Argentina
  - Gold Medal Game: (silver) United States 7–55 Canada (gold)

Sailing

- Race 1 in all 10 sailing events.

Shooting

  - Men's 10 metre air pistol: Felipe Almeida Wu (Brazil) sets a Final Pan Amerincan Games Record with the score of 201.8, Jay Shi (USA) takes silver with the score of 199.0, Mario Vinueza (Ecuador) takes bronze with the score of 176.3.
  - Women's 10 metre air pistol: Lynda Kiejko (Canada) sets a Final Pan Amerincan Games Record with the score of 195.7, Alejandra Zavala (Mexico) takes silver with the score of 194.3, Lilian Castro (El Salvador) takes bronze with the score of 172.0.

Softball

- Men's tournament: First day of Preliminaries
  - Dominican Republic 0–10 United States
  - Argentina 3–0 Venezuela
  - Canada 10–5 Mexico

Squash

- Men's singles: Quarterfinals and Semifinals (two bronze medals were awarded to each loser in the semifinals):
  - Miguel Ángel Rodríguez (COL) 3–0 Shawn Delierre (CAN) (bronze)
  - Diego Elías (PER) 3–2 César Salazar (MEX) (bronze)
- Women's singles: Quarterfinals and Semifinals (two bronze medals were awarded to each loser in the semifinals):
  - Amanda Sobhy (USA) 3–0 Samantha Cornett (CAN) (bronze)
  - Olivia Blatchford (USA) 3–0 S Terán (MEX) (bronze)

Swimming

- Men's marathon 10 kilometres: Chip Peterson (USA) won the marathon after the time of 1:54:03.6, David Heron takes silver with the time of 1:54:07.4, Esteban Enderica (Ecuador) takes bronze with the time of 1:54:09.2.

Tennis

- Men's singles: Third Round
- Men's doubles: Second day of First round
- Women's singles: Second day of First round
- Mixed doubles: First round

Triathlon

- Men's: Crisanto Grajales (Mexico) finished gold with the time of 1:48:58, Kevin McDowell (USA) finished silver with the time of 1:48:59, Irving Pérez (Mexico) finished bronze with the time of 1:49:05.

Water polo

- Women's tournament: Crossover and Semifinals
  - Crossover: Mexico 10–8 Venezuela
  - Crossover: Argentina 6–14 Puerto Rico
  - Semifinals: Cuba 7–14 Canada
  - Semifinals: United States 16–3 Brazil

Weightlifting

- Men's 69 kg: Luis Javier Mosquera (Colombia) set a Pan American Games record of 150 kg in snatch, 181 kg in clean and jerk and another in total of 331 kg, Bredni Roque (Mexico) takes silver with a score of 317 kg, Francis Luna-Grenier (Canada) takes bronze with a score of 299 kg.
- Women's 53 kg: Rusmeris Villar (Colombia) set a Pan American Games record of 115 kg in clean and jerk and finished the gold with a score of 201 kg. Génesis Rodríguez (Venezuela) finished with a total score of 201 kg, but lost the tiebreaker based on body weight and thus was awarded the silver. Yafreisy Silvestre (Dominican Republic) takes bronze with a score of 183 kg.
- Women's 58 kg: Lina Rivas (Colombia) finished with the gold with a final score of 215 kg, Yusleidy Figueroa (Venezuela) takes silver with the total score of 209 kg, Quisia Guicho (Mexico) takes bronze with the total score of 203 kg.

=== Gold medalists (day 2) ===
12 July 2015 — Gold medalists

Sport	Event	Competitor(s)	NOC	Rec	Ref
Canoeing	Men's K-4 1000 metres	Jorge García; Renier Mora; Reinier Torres; Álex Menéndez	Cuba		
Cycling	Men's cross-country	Raphaël Gagné	Canada		
Cycling	Women's cross-country	Emily Batty	Canada		
Diving	Men's 10 metre platform	Rommel Pacheco	Mexico		
Diving	Women's 3 metre springboard	Paola Espinosa	Mexico		
Equestrian	Team dressage	Sabine Schut-Kery; Kimberly Herslow; Laura Graves; Steffen Peters	United States		
Gymnastics	Women's artistic team all-around	Madison Desch; Rachel Gowey; Amelia Hundley; Emily Schlid; Megan Skaggs	United States		
Judo	Men's 66 kg	Charles Chibana	Brazil		
Judo	Men's 73 kg	Magdiel Estrada	Cuba		
Judo	Women's 57 kg	Marti Malloy	United States		
Roller sports	Men's free skating	Marcel Stürmer	Brazil		
Roller sports	Women's free skating	Giselle Soler	Argentina		
Roller sports	Men's 200 metres time-trial	Emanuelle Silva	Chile		
Roller sports	Women's 200 metres time-trial	Hellen Montoya	Colombia		
Rugby sevens	Men's tournament	Canada	Canada		
Rugby sevens	Women's tournament	Canada	Canada		
Shooting	Men's 10 metre air pistol	Felipe Almeida Wu	Brazil		
Shooting	Women's 10 metre air pistol	Lynda Kiejko	Canada		
Swimming	Men's marathon 10 kilometres	Chip Peterson	United States		
Triathlon	Men's	Crisanto Grajales	Mexico		
Weightlifting	Men's 69 kg	Luis Mosquera	Colombia	GR	
Weightlifting	Women's 53 kg	Rusmeris Villar	Colombia	GR	
Weightlifting	Women's 58 kg	Lina Rivas	Colombia		

== Day 3 – Monday 13 July 2015 ==
=== Detailed results (day 3) ===
13 July 2015 — detailed results

Badminton

- Quarterfinals for all five events.

Baseball

- Men's tournament: Third day of Preliminaries
  - Cuba 8–1 Puerto Rico
  - Colombia 3–5 United States
  - Nicaragua 1–9 Canada

Beach volleyball

- Men's tournament: First day of Preliminaries
- Women's tournament: First day of Preliminaries

Canoeing

- Men's C-1 1000 metres: Isaquias Queiroz (Brazil) awarded gold with the time of 4:07.866, silver awarded to Mark Oldershaw (Canada) with the time of 4:09.587, bronze awarded to Everardo Cristóbal (Mexico) with the time of 4:14.572.
- Men's C-2 1000 metres: Benjamin Russell and Gabriel Beauchesne-Sévigny (Canada) awarded gold with the time of 3:46.316, silver awarded to Erlon de Souza Silva and Isaquias Queiroz (Brazil) with the time of 3:47.117, bronze awarded to Serguey Torres and José Carlos Bulnes (Cuba) with the time of 3:49.932.
- Men's K-1 1000 metres: Jorge García (Cuba) awarded gold with the time of 3:40.990, silver awarded to Daniel Dal Bo (Argentina) with the time of 3:42.019, bronze awarded to Adam van Koeverden (Canada) with the time of 3:43.055.
- Men's K-2 1000 metres: Jorge García and Reinier Torres (Cuba) awarded gold with the time of 3:25.932, silver awarded to Pablo de Torres and Gonzalo Carreras (Argentina) with the time of 3:27.240, bronze awarded to Celso Dias De Oliveira Junior and Vagner Junior Souta (Brazil) with the time of 3:30.104.
- Women's K-1 500 metres: Yusmari Mengana (Cuba) awarded gold with the time of 2:00.656, silver awarded to Michelle Russell (Canada) with the time of 2:02.381, bronze awarded to Ana Paula Vergutz (Brazil) with the time of 2:03.329.

Diving

- Men's synchronized 3 metre springboard: Jahir Ocampo and Rommel Pacheco (Mexico) won gold with a total score of 438.27, Philippe Gagné and François Imbeau-Dulac (Canada) takes silver with a total score of 413.37, Cory Bowersox and Zachary Nees (USA) takes bronze with a total score of 385.38.
- Men's synchronized 10 metre platform: Jeinkler Aguirre and José Guerra (Cuba) won gold with a total score of 439.14, Vincent Riendeau and Philippe Gagné (Canada) takes silver with a total score of 404.34, Víctor Ortega and Juan Guillermo Rios (Colombia) takes bronze with a total score of 403.23.
- Women's synchronized 3 metre springboard: Paola Espinosa and Dolores Hernández (Mexico) won gold with a total score of 301.20, Jennifer Abel and Pamela Ware (Canada) takes silver with a total score of 298.23, Deidre Freeman and Maren Taylor (USA) takes bronze with a total score of 293.10.
- Women's synchronized 10 metre platform: Meaghan Benfeito and Roseline Filion (Canada) won gold with a total score of 316.89, Ingrid De Oliveira and Giovanna Pedroso (Brazil) takes silver with a total score of 291.36, Paola Espinosa and Alejandra Orozco (Mexico) takes bronze with a total score of 287.91.

Field hockey

- Women's tournament: First day of Preliminary round
  - Pool A: Argentina 9–0 Mexico
  - Pool A: Canada 12–1 Dominican Republic
  - Pool B: Chile 7–2 Cuba
  - Pool B: United States 5–0 Uruguay

Football

- Men's tournament: Second day of First round
  - Pool B: Trinidad and Tobago 0–4 Uruguay
  - Pool B: Paraguay 1–1 Mexico

Gymnastics

- Men's artistic individual all-around: Samuel Mikulak (USA) won gold with the total score of 89.650, silver went to Manrique Larduet (Cuba) with a total score of 89.600, bronze went to Jossimar Calvo (Colombia) with the total score of 89.400.
- Women's artistic individual all-around: Ellie Black (Canada) won gold with the total score of 58.150, silver went to Madison Desch (USA) with a total score of 57.450, bronze went to Flávia Saraiva (Brazil) with the total score of 57.050.

Judo

- Men's 81 kg:
  - Semifinal no. 1: Iván Felipe Silva (CUB) defeated Victor Penalber (BRA)
  - Semifinal no. 2: Travis Stevens (USA) defeated Pedro Castro (COL)
  - Bronze Medal Match no. 1: (bronze) Pedro Castro (COL) defeated Zachary Burt (CAN)
  - Bronze Medal Match no. 2: (bronze) Victor Penalber (BRA) defeated Gadiel Miranda (PUR)
  - Gold Medal Match: (gold) Travis Stevens (USA) defeated (silver) Iván Felipe Silva (CUB)
- Men's 90 kg:
  - Semifinal no. 1: Asley González (CUB) defeated Isao Cárdenas (MEX)
  - Semifinal no. 2: Tiago Camilo (BRA) defeated Cristian Schmidt (ARG)
  - Bronze Medal Match no. 1: (bronze) Jacob Larsen (USA) defeated Cristian Schmidt (ARG)
  - Bronze Medal Match no. 2: (bronze) Isao Cárdenas (MEX) defeated Rafael Romo (CHI)
  - Gold Medal Match: (gold) Tiago Camilo (BRA) defeated (silver) Asley González (CUB)
- Women's 63 kg:
  - Semifinal no. 1: Stéfanie Tremblay (CAN) defeated Mariana Silva (BRA)
  - Semifinal no. 2: Estefania García (ECU) defeated Hannah Martin (USA)
  - Bronze Medal Match no. 1: (bronze) Maylin del Toro (CUB) defeated Hannah Martin (USA)
  - Bronze Medal Match no. 2: (bronze) Mariana Silva (BRA) defeated Diana Velasco (COL)
  - Gold Medal Match: (gold) Estefania García (ECU) defeated (silver) Stéfanie Tremblay (CAN)
- Women's 70 kg:
  - Semifinal no. 1: Onix Cortés (CUB) defeated Yuri Alvear (COL)
  - Semifinal no. 2: Kelita Zupancic (CAN) defeated Maria Portela (BRA)
  - Bronze Medal Match no. 1: (bronze) Maria Portela (BRA) defeated Andrea Poo (MEX)
  - Bronze Medal Match no. 2: (bronze) Yuri Alvear (COL) defeated Vanessa Chala (ECU)
  - Gold Medal Match: (gold) Kelita Zupancic (CAN) defeated (silver) Onix Cortés (CUB)

Roller sports

- Men's 500 metres: Pedro Causil (Colombia) won the gold with the time of 40.650, Ezequiel Capellano (Argentina) takes silver with the time of 40.909, Jorge Martínez (Mexico) takes bronze with the time of 41.146.
- Men's 10,000 metres points race: Mike Paez (Mexico) won gold with 23 points, Juan Sebastian Sanz Neira (Colombia) takes silver with 13 points, Jordan Belchos (Canada) takes bronze with 9 points.
- Women's 500 metres: Hellen Montoya (Colombia) won the gold with the time of 43.370, Erin Jackson (USA) takes silver with the time of 43.714, Ingrid Factos (Ecuador) takes bronze with the time of 43.875.
- Women's 10,000 metres points race:

=== Gold medalists (day 3) ===
13 July 2015 — Gold medalists

Sport	Event	Competitor(s)	NOC	Rec	Ref
Canoeing	Men's C-1 1000 metres	Isaquias Queiroz	Brazil		
Canoeing	Men's C-2 1000 metres	Benjamin Russell; Gabriel Beauchesne-Sévigny	Canada		
Canoeing	Men's K-1 1000 metres	Jorge García	Cuba		
Canoeing	Men's K-2 1000 metres	Jorge García; Reinier Torres	Cuba		
Canoeing	Women's K-1 500 metres	Yusmari Mengana	Cuba		
Diving	Men's synchronized 3 metre springboard	Jahir Ocampo; Rommel Pacheco	Mexico		
Diving	Men's synchronized 10 metre platform	Jeinkler Aguirre; José Guerra	Cuba		
Diving	Women's synchronized 3 metre springboard	Paola Espinosa; Dolores Hernández	Mexico		
Diving	Women's synchronized 10 metre platform	Meaghan Benfeito; Roseline Filion	Canada		
Gymnastics	Men's artistic individual all-around	Sam Mikulak	United States		
Gymnastics	Women's artistic individual all-around	Ellie Black	Canada		
Judo	Men's 81 kg	Travis Stevens	United States		
Judo	Men's 90 kg	Tiago Camilo	Brazil		
Judo	Women's 63 kg	Estefania García	Ecuador		
Judo	Women's 70 kg	Kelita Zupancic	Canada		
Roller sports	Men's 500 metres	Pedro Causil Rojas	Colombia		
Roller sports	Men's 10,000 metres points race	Mike Paez	Mexico		
Roller sports	Women's 500 metres	Hellen Montoya	Colombia		
Roller sports	Women's 10,000 metres points race	Maria Arias	Argentina		
Rowing	Men's double sculls	Eduardo Rubio; Ángel Fournier	Cuba		
Rowing	Men's coxless four	Will Crothers; Tim Schrijver; Kai Langerfeld; Conlin McCabe	Canada		
Rowing	Women's double sculls	Kerry Maher-Shaffer; Antje von Seydlitz	Canada		
Rowing	Women's coxless pair	Emily Huelskamp; Molly Bruggeman	United States		
Shooting	Men's 10 metre air rifle	Connor Davis	United States		
Shooting	Women's 10 metre air rifle	Goretti Zumaya	Mexico		
Shooting	Women's trap	Amanda Chudoba	Canada		
Squash	Men's singles	Miguel Ángel Rodríguez	Colombia		
Squash	Women's singles	Amanda Sobhy	United States		
Weightlifting	Men's 77 kg	Addriel La O	Cuba		
Weightlifting	Men's 85 kg	Yoelmis Hernández	Cuba		
Weightlifting	Women's 63 kg	Mercedes Pérez	Colombia		

== Day 4 – Tuesday 14 July 2015 ==
=== Gold medalists (day 4) ===
14 July 2015 — Gold medalists

Sport	Event	Competitor(s)	NOC	Rec	Ref
Canoeing	Men's C-1 200 metres	Isaquias Queiroz	Brazil		
Canoeing	Men's K-1 200 metres	Mark de Jonge	Canada		
Canoeing	Men's K-2 200 metres	Ezequiel Di Giacomo; Rubén Voisard	Argentina		
Canoeing	Women's C-1 200 metres	Laurence Vincent-Lapointe	Canada		
Canoeing	Women's K-1 200 metres	Yusmari Mengana	Cuba		
Canoeing	Women's K-2 500 metres	Yusmari Mengana; Yurieni Guerra	Cuba		
Equestrian	Individual dressage	Steffen Peters	United States		
Gymnastics	Men's floor	Jorge Vega Lopez	Guatemala		
Gymnastics	Men's pommel horse	Marvin Kimble	United States		
Gymnastics	Men's pommel horse	Jossimar Calvo	Colombia		
Gymnastics	Men's rings	Arthur Zanetti	Brazil		
Gymnastics	Women's vault	Marcia Videaux Jiménez	Cuba		
Gymnastics	Women's uneven bars	Rachel Gowey	United States		
Judo	Men's 100 kg	Luciano Corrêa	Brazil		
Judo	Men's +100 kg	David Moura	Brazil		
Judo	Women's 78 kg	Kayla Harrison	United States		
Judo	Women's +78 kg	Idalys Ortiz	Cuba		
Rowing	Men's lightweight double sculls	Alan Armenta; Alexis Lopez	Mexico		
Rowing	Men's quadruple sculls	Matthew Buie; Julien Bahain; Will Dean; Rob Gibson	Canada		
Rowing	Men's coxless pair	Axel Haack; Diego Lopez	Argentina		
Rowing	Men's coxless pair	Félipe Leal; Oscar Vasquez	Chile		
Rowing	Women's single sculls	Carling Zeeman	Canada		
Rowing	Women's lightweight double sculls	Liz Fenje; Katherine Sauks	Canada		
Shooting	Men's trap	Francisco Boza Dibos	Peru		
Squash	Men's doubles	Andres Herrara; Juan Vargas	Colombia		
Squash	Women's doubles	Natalie Grainger; Amanda Sobhy	United States		
Swimming	Men's 100 metre freestyle	Federico Grabich	Argentina		
Swimming	Men's 200 metre butterfly	Leonardo de Deus	Brazil		
Swimming	Men's 4 × 100 metre freestyle relay	João de Lucca; Bruno Fratus; Matheus Santana; Marcelo Chierighini	Brazil		
Swimming	Women's 100 metre freestyle	Chantal Van Landeghem	Canada		
Swimming	Women's 200 metre butterfly	Audrey Lacroix	Canada		
Swimming	Women's 4 × 100 metre freestyle relay	Sandrine Mainville; Katerine Savard; Michelle Williams; Chantal Van Landeghem	Canada		
Water polo	Women's tournament	United States	United States		
Weightlifting	Men's 94 kg	Kendrick Farris	United States		
Weightlifting	Women's 69 kg	Leydi Solís	Colombia		
Weightlifting	Women's 75 kg	Ubaldina Valoyes	Colombia		

== Day 5 – Wednesday 15 July 2015 ==
=== Gold medalists (day 5) ===
15 July 2015 — Gold medalists

Sport	Event	Competitor(s)	NOC	Rec	Ref
Badminton	Men's doubles	Phillip Chew; Sattawat Pongnairat	United States		
Badminton	Women's doubles	Eva Lee; Paula Lynn Obañana	United States		
Gymnastics	Men's horizontal bar	Jossimar Calvo	Colombia		
Gymnastics	Men's parallel bars	Jossimar Calvo	Colombia		
Gymnastics	Men's vault	Manrique Larduet	Cuba		
Gymnastics	Women's balance beam	Ellie Black	Canada		
Gymnastics	Women's floor	Ellie Black	Canada		
Rowing	Men's single sculls	Ángel Fournier	Cuba		
Rowing	Men's lightweight coxless four	Mazwell Lattimer; Brendan Hodge; Nicolas Pratt; Eric Woelfl	Canada		
Rowing	Men's eight	Canada	Canada		
Rowing	Women's lightweight single sculls	Mary Jones	United States		
Rowing	Women's quadruple sculls	Kate Goodfellow; Kerry Maher-Shaffer; Carling Zeeman; Antje von Seydlitz	Canada		
Shooting	Men's 25 m rapid fire pistol	Brad Balsley	United States		
Shooting	Women's 25 m pistol	Lynda Kiejko	Canada		
Swimming	Men's 200 metre freestyle	João de Lucca	Brazil		
Swimming	Men's 200 metre backstroke	Sean Lehane	United States		
Swimming	Men's 200 metre breastroke	Thiago Simon	Brazil		
Swimming	Men's 4 × 200 metre freestyle relay	Luiz Melo; João de Lucca; Thiago Pereira; Nicolas Oliveira	Brazil		
Swimming	Women's 200 metre freestyle	Allison Schmitt	United States		
Swimming	Women's 200 metre backstroke	Hilary Caldwell	Canada		
Swimming	Women's 200 metre breaststroke	Kierra Smith	Canada		
Tennis	Men's singles	Facundo Bagnis	Argentina		
Tennis	Men's doubles	Nicolás Jarry; Hans Podlipnik	Chile		
Tennis	Mixed doubles	Guido Andreozzi; María Irigoyen	Argentina		
Water polo	Men's tournament	United States	United States		
Weightlifting	Men's 105 kg	Jesús González Barrios	Venezuela		
Weightlifting	Men's +105 kg	Fernando Reis	Brazil		
Weightlifting	Women's +75 kg	Yaniuska Espinosa	Venezuela		
Wrestling	Men's Greco-Roman 59 kg	Andrés Montaño	Ecuador		
Wrestling	Men's Greco-Roman 66 kg	Wuilexis Rivas	Venezuela		
Wrestling	Men's Greco-Roman 75 kg	Andrew Bisek	United States		
Wrestling	Men's Greco-Roman 85 kg	Jon Anderson	United States		

== Day 6 – Thursday 16 July 2015 ==
=== Gold medalists (day 6) ===
16 July 2015 — Gold medalists

Sport	Event	Competitor(s)	NOC	Rec	Ref
Badminton	Men's singles	Kevin Cordón	Guatemala		
Badminton	Women's singles	Michelle Li	Canada		
Badminton	Mixed doubles	Phillip Chew; Jamie Subandhi	United States		
Cycling	Men's team sprint	Hugo Barrette; Evan Carey; Joseph Veloce	Canada		
Cycling	Women's team sprint	Kate O'Brien; Monique Sullivan	Canada		
Shooting	Men's double trap	Hebert Brol Cardenas	Guatemala		
Swimming	Men's 100 metre butterfly	Giles Smith	United States		
Swimming	Men's 400 metre individual medley	Brandonn Almeida	Brazil		
Swimming	Women's 100 metre butterfly	Kelsi Worrell	United States		
Swimming	Women's 400 metre individual medley	Caitlin Leverenz	United States		
Swimming	Women's 4 × 200 metre freestyle relay	Courtney Harnish; Gillian Ryan; Kiera Janzen; Allison Schmitt	United States		
Tennis	Women's singles	Mariana Duque Mariño	Colombia		
Tennis	Women's doubles	Gaby Dabrowski; Carol Zhao	Canada		
Wrestling	Men's Greco-Roman 98 kg	Yasmany Lugo Cabrera	Cuba		
Wrestling	Men's Greco-Roman 130 kg	Mijaín López	Cuba		
Wrestling	Women's freestyle 48 kg	Geneviève Morrison	Canada		
Wrestling	Women's freestyle 53 kg	Whitney Conder	United States		
Wrestling	Women's freestyle 58 kg	Joice Souza da Silva	Brazil		

== Day 7 – Friday 17 July 2015 ==
=== Gold medalists (day 7) ===
17 July 2015 — Gold medalists

Sport	Event	Competitor(s)	NOC	Rec	Ref
Archery	Men's team	Juan René Serrano; Ernesto Horacio Boardman; Luis Álvarez	Mexico		
Archery	Women's team	Natalia Sánchez; Ana Rendón; Maira Alejandra Sepúlveda	Colombia		
Cycling	Men's omnium	Fernando Gaviria Rendon	Colombia		
Cycling	Women's team pursuit	Jasmin Glaesser; Allison Beveridge; Laura Brown; Kirsti Lay	Canada		
Cycling	Women's keirin	Monique Sullivan	Canada		
Shooting	Men's 50 m pistol	Júlio Almeida	Brazil		
Shooting	Men's 50 m rifle prone	Cassio Cesar Rippel	Brazil		
Squash	Men's team	Shawn Delierre; Andrew Schnell; Graeme Schnell	Canada		
Squash	Women's team	Amanda Sobhy; Olivia Blatchford; Natalie Grainger	United States		
Swimming	Men's 50 metre freestyle	Josh Schneider	United States		
Swimming	Men's 400 metre freestyle	Ryan Cochrane	Canada		
Swimming	Men's 100 metre backstroke	Nicholas Thoman	United States		
Swimming	Men's 100 m breaststroke	Felipe França Silva	Brazil		
Swimming	Women's 50 metre freestyle	Arianna Vanderpool-Wallace	Bahamas		
Swimming	Women's 400 metre freestyle	Emily Overholt	Canada		
Swimming	Women's 100 metre backstroke	Etiene Medeiros	Brazil		
Swimming	Women's 100 m breaststroke	Katie Meili	United States		
Wrestling	Men's Freestyle 57 kg	Yowlys Bonne	Cuba		
Wrestling	Men's Freestyle 65 kg	Brent Metcalf	United States		
Wrestling	Women's Freestyle 63 kg	Braxton Stone	Canada		
Wrestling	Women's Freestyle 69 kg	Dori Yeats	Canada		
Wrestling	Women's Freestyle 75 kg	Adeline Gray	United States		

== Day 8 – Saturday 18 July 2015 ==
=== Gold medalists (day 8) ===
18 July 2015 — Gold medalists

Sport	Event	Competitor(s)	NOC	Rec	Ref
Archery	Men's individual	Luis Alvarez	Mexico		
Archery	Women's individual	Khatuna Lorig	United States		
Athletics	Women's marathon	Gladys Tejeda	Peru		
Cycling	Men's sprint	Hugo Barrette	Canada		
Gymnastics	Women's rhythmic individual all-around	Laura Zeng	United States		
Gymnastics	Women's rhythmic group all-around	Brazil	Brazil		
Modern pentathlon	Women's	Donna Vakalis	Canada		
Sailing	Women laser radial	Paige Railey	United States		
Sailing	Women windsurf RSX	Patrícia Freitas	Brazil		
Sailing	Women 49er FX	Maria Branz; Victoria Travascio	Argentina		
Sailing	Men windsurfing RXS	Ricardo Winicki	Brazil		
Sailing	Men laser	Juan Ignacio Maegli	Guatemala		
Shooting	Women's 50 m rifle 3 positions	Eglis de la Cruz	Cuba		
Shooting	Women's skeet	Kim Rhode	United States		
Softball	Men's tournament	Canada	Canada		
Swimming	Men's 1500 metre freestyle	Ryan Cochrane	Canada		
Swimming	Men's 200 m individual medley	Henrique Rodrigues	Brazil		
Swimming	Men's 4 × 100 m medley relay	Arthur Mendes; Marcelo Chierighini; Guilherme Guido; Felipe França Silva	Brazil		
Swimming	Women's 800 metre freestyle	Sierra Schmidt	United States		
Swimming	Women's 200 m individual medley	Caitlin Leverenz	United States		
Swimming	Women's 4 × 100 m medley relay	Natalie Coughlin; Katie Meili; Kelsi Worrell; Allison Schmitt	United States		
Wrestling	Men's Freestyle 74 kg	Jordan Burroughs	United States		
Wrestling	Men's Freestyle 86 kg	Reineris Salas	Cuba		
Wrestling	Men's Freestyle 97 kg	Kyle Snyder	United States		
Wrestling	Men's Freestyle 125 kg	Zach Rey	United States		

== Day 9 – Sunday 19 July 2015 ==
=== Gold medalists (day 9) ===
19 July 2015 — Gold medalists

Sport	Event	Competitor(s)	NOC	Rec	Ref
Athletics	Men's 20 km walk	Evan Dunfee	Canada		
Athletics	Women's 20 km walk	María González	Mexico		
Baseball	Men's tournament	Canada	Canada		
Canoeing	Men's slalom C-1	Casey Eichfeld	United States		
Canoeing	Men's slalom C-2	Devin McEwan; Casey Eichfeld	United States		
Canoeing	Men's slalom K-1	Michal Smolen	United States		
Canoeing	Women's slalom C-1	Ana Sátila	Brazil		
Canoeing	Women's slalom K-1	Jazmyne Denhollander	Canada		
Cycling	Men's keirin	Fabián Puerta	Colombia		
Cycling	Men's team pursuit	Juan Arango; Arles Castro; Fernando Gaviria; Jonathan Restrepo	Colombia		
Cycling	Women's sprint	Monique Sullivan	Canada		
Cycling	Women's omnium	Sarah Hammer	United States		
Equestrian	Individual eventing	Marilyn Little	United States		
Equestrian	Team eventing	Phillip Dutton; Lauren Kieffer; Marilyn Little; Boyd Martin	United States		
Golf	Men's individual	Marcelo Rozo	Colombia		
Golf	Women's individual	Mariajo Uribe	Colombia		
Golf	Mixed team	Mateo Gomez; Paola Moreno; Marcelo Rozo; Mariajo Uribe	Colombia		
Gymnastics	Women's rhythmic individual ball	Laura Zeng	United States		
Gymnastics	Women's rhythmic individual hoop	Laura Zeng	United States		
Gymnastics	Women's rhythmic group 5 ribbons	Dayane Amaral; Morgana Gmach; Emanuelle Lima; Jessica Maier; Ana Paula Ribeiro; Beatriz Pomini	Brazil		
Gymnastics	Men's trampoline	Keegan Soehn	Canada		
Gymnastics	Women's trampoline	Rosannagh MacLennan	Canada		
Modern pentathlon	Men's	Charles Fernandez	Guatemala		
Sailing	Mixed lightning	Javier Conte; Nicolas Fracchia; María Salerno	Argentina		
Sailing	Open Sunfish	Jonathan Martinetti Mawyin	Ecuador		
Sailing	Open hobie 16	Irene Abascal van Blerk; Jason Hess Castillo	Guatemala		
Sailing	Open Snipe	Fernando Monllor Pacheco; Raul Andres Rios de Choudens	Puerto Rico		
Sailing	Open J-24	Federico Ambrus; Guillermo Bellinotto; Matias Pereira; Juan Pereyra	Argentina		
Shooting	Men's 50 m rifle 3 positions	Reynier Estopinan	Cuba		
Shooting	Men's skeet	Thomas Bayer	United States		
Taekwondo	Men's 58 kg	Carlos Navarro	Mexico		
Taekwondo	Women's 49 kg	Yania Aguirre	Cuba		

== Day 10 – Monday 20 July 2015 ==
=== Gold medalists (day 10) ===
20 July 2015 — Gold medalists

Sport	Event	Competitor(s)	NOC	Rec	Ref
Basketball	Women's tournament	Canada	Canada		
Fencing	Men's individual sabre	Eli Dershwitz	United States		
Fencing	Women's individual sabre	Dagmara Wozniak	United States		
Gymnastics	Women's rhythmic individual club	Laura Zeng	United States		
Gymnastics	Women's rhythmic individual ribbon	Laura Zeng	United States		
Gymnastics	Women's rhythmic group 6 clubs + 2 hoops	Kiana Eide; Alisa Kano; Natalie McGiffert; Jennifer Rokhman; Monica Rokhman; Kristen Shaldybin	United States		
Taekwondo	Men's -68 kg	Saúl Gutiérrez	Mexico		
Taekwondo	Women's -57 kg	Cheyenne Lewis	United States		

== Day 11 – Tuesday 21 July 2015 ==
=== Gold medalists (day 11) ===
21 July 2015 — Gold medalists

Sport	Event	Competitor(s)	NOC	Rec	Ref
Athletics	Men's 10,000 metres	Mohammed Ahmed	Canada		
Athletics	Men's 3000 metres steeplechase	Matt Hughes	Canada		
Athletics	Men's pole vault	Shawnacy Barber	Canada		
Athletics	Men's shot put	O'Dayne Richards	Jamaica		
Athletics	Women's 5000 metres	Juliana Paula dos Santos	Brazil		
Athletics	Women's 100 metres hurdles	Queen Harrison	United States		
Athletics	Women's triple jump	Caterine Ibargüen	Colombia		
Athletics	Women's javelin throw	Elizabeth Gleadle	Canada		
Athletics	Women's hammer throw	Rosa Rodríguez	Venezuela		
Beach volleyball	Men's tournament	Rodolfo Ontiveros; Juan Virgen	Mexico		
Beach volleyball	Women's tournament	Ana Gallay; Georgina Klug	Argentina		
Fencing	Men's individual épée	Rubén Limardo	Venezuela		
Fencing	Women's individual épée	Katharine Holmes	United States		
Table tennis	Men's team	Hugo Calderano; Thiago Monteiro; Gustavo Tsuboi	Brazil		
Table tennis	Women's team	Jennifer Wu; Lily Zhang; Jiaqi Zheng	United States		
Taekwondo	Men's 80 kg	Jose Cobas	Cuba		
Taekwondo	Women's 67 kg	Paige McPherson	United States		

== Day 12 – Wednesday 22 July 2015 ==
=== Gold medalists (day 12) ===
22 July 2015 — Gold medalists

Sport	Event	Competitor(s)	NOC	Rec	Ref
Athletics	Men's 100 metres	Andre De Grasse	Canada		
Athletics	Men's long jump	Jeffery Henderson	United States		
Athletics	Men's hammer throw	Kibwé Johnson	United States		
Athletics	Women's 100 metres	Sherone Simpson	Jamaica		
Athletics	Women's 800 metres	Melissa Bishop	Canada		
Athletics	Women's 400 metres hurdles	Shamier Little	United States		
Athletics	Women's high jump	Levern Spencer	Saint Lucia		
Athletics	Women's shot put	Cleopatra Borel	Trinidad and Tobago		
Cycling	Men's road time trial	Hugo Houle	Canada		
Cycling	Women's road time trial	Kelly Catlin	United States		
Fencing	Men's individual foil	Alexander Massialas	United States		
Fencing	Women's individual foil	Lee Kiefer	United States		
Taekwondo	Men's +80 kg	Rafael Alba Castillo	Cuba		
Taekwondo	Women's +67 kg	Jackie Galloway	United States		
Water skiing	Men's overall	Felipe Miranda	Chile		
Water skiing	Men's wakeboard	Rusty Malinoski	Canada		
Water skiing	Women's overall	Whitney McClintock	Canada		

== Day 13 – Thursday 23 July 2015 ==
=== Gold medalists (day 13) ===
23 July 2015 — Gold medalists

Sport	Event	Competitor(s)	NOC	Rec	Ref
Athletics	Men's 400 metres	Luguelín Santos	Dominican Republic		
Athletics	Men's 800 metres	Clayton Murphy	United States		
Athletics	Men's 400 metres hurdles	Jeffery Gibson	Bahamas		
Athletics	Men's discus throw	Fedrick Dacres	Jamaica		
Athletics	Men's decathlon	Damian Warner	Canada		
Athletics	Women's 400 metres	Kendall Baisden	United States		
Athletics	Women's 10,000 metres	Brenda Flores	Mexico		
Athletics	Women's pole vault	Yarisley Silva	Cuba		
Bowling	Men's doubles	François Lavoie; Dan MacLelland	Canada		
Bowling	Women's doubles	Clara Guerrero; Rocio Restrepo	Colombia		
Equestrian	Team jumping	Tiffany Foster; Eric Lamaze; Ian Millar; Yann Candele; Elizabeth Gingras	Canada		
Fencing	Men's team sabre	Eli Dershwitz; Daryl Homer; Jeff Spear	United States		
Fencing	Women's team sabre	Ibtihaj Muhammad; Dagmara Wozniak; Mariel Zagunis	United States		
Karate	Men's 60 kg	Douglas Brose	Brazil		
Karate	Women's 50 kg	Anna Villanueva	Dominican Republic		
Karate	Women's 55 kg	Valeria Kumizaki	United States		
Water skiing	Men's jump	Ryan Dodd	Canada		
Water skiing	Men's slalom	Nate Smith	United States		
Water skiing	Men's tricks	Adam Pickos	United States		
Water skiing	Women's jump	Regina Jaquess	United States		
Water skiing	Women's slalom	Whitney McClintock	Canada		
Water skiing	Women's tricks	Natalia Cuglievan	Peru		

== Day 14 – Friday 24 July 2015 ==
=== Gold medalists (day 14) ===
24 July 2015 — Gold medalists

Sport	Event	Competitor(s)	NOC	Rec	Ref
Athletics	Men's 200 metres	Andre De Grasse	Canada		
Athletics	Men's 1500 metres	Andrew Wheating	United States		
Athletics	Men's 110 metres hurdles	David Oliver	United States	GR	
Athletics	Men's triple jump	Pedro Pablo Pichardo	Cuba		
Athletics	Men's javelin throw	Keshorn Walcott	Trinidad and Tobago		
Athletics	Women's 200 metres	Kaylin Whitney	United States		
Athletics	Women's 800 metres	Melissa Bishop	Canada		
Athletics	Women's 3000 metres steeplechase	Ashley Higginson	United States	GR	
Athletics	Women's discus throw	Denia Caballero	Cuba		
Boxing	Men's light flyweight	Joselito Velázquez	Mexico		
Boxing	Men's Bantamweight	Andy Cruz Gomez	Cuba		
Boxing	Men's Light welterweight	Arthur Biyarslanov	Canada		
Boxing	Men's Middleweight	Arlen López	Cuba		
Boxing	Men's Heavyweight	Erislandy Savón	Cuba		
Boxing	Women's light heavyweight	Claressa Shields	United States		
Fencing	Men's team épée	Silvio Fernández; Francisco Limardo; Rubén Limardo	Venezuela		
Fencing	Women's team épée	Katharine Holmes; Katarzyna Trzopek; Anna van Brummen	United States		
Field hockey	Women's tournament	United States	United States		
Handball	Women's tournament	Brazil	Brazil		
Karate	Men's 67 kg	Julián Pinzás	Argentina		
Karate	Men's 75 kg	Thomas Scott	United States		
Karate	Women's 61 kg	Alexandra Grande	Peru		
Racquetball	Men's singles	Rocky Carson	United States		
Racquetball	Men's doubles	Jansen Allen; Jose Rojas	United States		
Racquetball	Women's singles	Maria Sotomayor	Ecuador		
Racquetball	Women's doubles	Paola Longoria; Samantha Salas	Mexico		

== Day 15 – Saturday 25 July 2015 ==
=== Gold medalists (day 15) ===
25 July 2015 — Gold medalists

Sport	Event	Competitor(s)	NOC	Rec	Ref
Athletics	Men's 5000 metres	Juan Luis Barrios	Mexico		
Athletics	Men's 4 × 100 metres relay	BeeJay Lee; Wallace Spearmon; Kendal Williams; Remontay McClain; Sean McLean	United States		
Athletics	Men's 4 × 400 metres relay	Renny Quow; Jarrin Solomon; Emanuel Mayers; Machel Cedenio; Jehue Gordon	Trinidad and Tobago		
Athletics	Men's marathon	Richer Pérez	Cuba		
Athletics	Men's high jump	Derek Drouin	Canada		
Athletics	Women's 1500 metres	Muriel Coneo	Colombia		
Athletics	Women's 4 × 100 metres relay	Barbara Pierre; LaKeisha Lawson; Morolake Akinosun; Kaylin Whitney	United States	GR	
Athletics	Women's 4 × 400 metres relay	Shamier Little; Kyra Jefferson; Shakima Wimbley; Kendall Baisden; Alysia Montaño	United States		
Athletics	Women's heptathlon	Yorgelis Rodriguez	Cuba		
Basketball	Men's tournament	Brazil	Brazil		
Bowling	Men's singles	Marcelo Suartz	Brazil		
Bowling	Women's singles	Shannon Pluhowsky	United States		
Boxing	Men's Flyweight	Antonio Vargas	United States		
Boxing	Men's Lightweight	Lázaro Álvarez	Cuba		
Boxing	Men's Welterweight	Gabriel Maestre	Venezuela		
Boxing	Men's Light heavyweight	Julio César La Cruz	Cuba		
Boxing	Men's Super heavyweight	Lenier Pero	Cuba		
Boxing	Women's flyweight	Mandy Bujold	Canada		
Boxing	Women's light welterweight	Caroline Veyre	Canada		
Cycling	Men's road race	Miguel Ubeto	Venezuela		
Cycling	Women's road race	Jasmin Glaesser	Canada		
Equestrian	Individual jumping	McLain Ward	United States		
Fencing	Men's team foil	Miles Chamley-Watson; Alexander Massialas; Gerek Meinhardt	United States		
Fencing	Women's team foil	Alanna Goldie; Eleanor Harvey; Kelleigh Ryan	Canada		
Field hockey	Men's tournament	Argentina	Argentina		
Football	Women's tournament	Brazil	Brazil		
Handball	Men's tournament	Brazil	Brazil		
Karate	Men's 84 kg	Miguel Amargós	Argentina		
Karate	Men's +84 kg	Franklin Mina	Ecuador		
Karate	Women's 68 kg	Natália Brozulatto	Brazil		
Karate	Women's +68 kg	Valeria Echever	Ecuador		
Table tennis	Men's singles	Hugo Calderano	Brazil		
Table tennis	Women's singles	Jennifer Wu	United States		

== Day 16 – Sunday 26 July 2015 ==
=== Gold medalists (day 16) ===
26 July 2015 — Gold medalists

Sport	Event	Competitor(s)	NOC	Rec	Ref
Athletics	Men's 50 kilometres walk	Andrés Chocho	Ecuador		
Baseball	Women's tournament	United States	United States		
Football	Men's tournament	Uruguay	Uruguay		
Racquetball	Men's team	Álvaro Beltrán; Daniel de la Rosa; Javier Moreno	Mexico		
Racquetball	Women's team	Paola Longoria; Samantha Salas	Mexico		
Softball	Women's tournament	Canada	Canada		
Volleyball	Men's tournament	Argentina	Argentina		
Volleyball	Women's tournament	United States	United States		
