= Ottawa Gee-Gees =

Athletic teams that represent the University of Ottawa

- University: University of Ottawa
- Nickname: Gees, Garnet and Grey/Grenat et Gris
- Association: U Sports
- Conference: Ontario University Athletics, Quebec Student Sports Federation
- Athletic director: Darren Cates
- Location: Ottawa, Ontario
- Varsity teams: 15 varsity, 17 competitive
- Football stadium: Gee-Gees Field, TD Place Stadium
- Basketball arena: Montpetit Hall
- Ice hockey arena: Minto Sports Complex
- Soccer stadium: Matt Anthony Field
- Colors: Garnet and grey
- Mascot: The Gee-Gee
- Website: www.geegees.ca

The Ottawa Gee-Gees (French: Gee-Gees d'Ottawa) are the athletic teams that represent the University of Ottawa in Ottawa, Ontario.

The Gee-Gees won the national football championship, the Vanier Cup, in 1975 and 2000, while also appearing in the game in the 1970, 1980, and 1997 seasons. The Gee-Gees women's rugby team won the national championship in 2017, and the women's soccer team were national champions in 1996 and 2018. The men's cross country team won three national titles, in 1986, 1987, and 1990.

The men's rugby team will host the 2024 Canadian University Men's Rugby Championship and are granted automatic entry as hosts. They are undefeated at home in 2023 and 2024, and are consistently ranked as a top 10 team in the country.

The men's hockey team will host the 2025 U Sports University Cup from March 20–23, 2025 and are granted automatic entry as hosts. The team finished the 2023–24 season 20–8.

== Name ==
The name is a result of a progressive evolution. Similar to many older institutions, their teams were long referred to by the school's colours as the Garnet and Grey (French: Grenat et Gris). Eventually, members of the media began to refer to the teams simply as the ‘GGs’, providing a nickname in both English and French for the bilingual school's teams. The nickname stuck and would eventually be combined with a horse racing term (where a gee-gee is the first horse out of the starting gate) to create the current Gee-Gees team name.

== Conference affiliations ==
Conference	Joined	Sport(s)
OUA	1968	Primary
RSEQ	(various)	Rugby (m/w), ice hockey (w)

== Teams ==
=== Varsity teams ===
Men's sports	Women's sports
Basketball	Basketball
Football	Ice hockey
Ice hockey	Rugby
Soccer	Soccer
Swimming	Swimming
Volleyball

=== Varsity clubs ===
Men's sports	Women's sports
Alpine skiing	Alpine skiing
Badminton	Artistic swimming
Baseball	Badminton
Cross country	Cross country
Equestrian	Equestrian
Fencing	Fencing
Golf	Golf
Lacrosse	Nordic skiing
Nordic skiing	Softball
Rowing	Rowing
Rugby	Track and field
Squash	Squash
Tennis	Tennis
Track and field	Track and field
Volleyball	Water polo
Water polo	

=== Men's basketball ===
In July 2010, the University of Ottawa appointed James Derouin, an alumnus and former player, as their new head coach after the departure of Coach Dave DeAveiro, who left for McGill University. Derouin was an assistant coach for the UBC Thunderbirds for the previous two years and was captain of the Gee-Gees men's basketball team for both the 2000–01 and 2001–02 seasons. In his final year, he also played under DeAveiro.

The 11-win 2010–11 season was successful despite falling just short of an entrance to the Final 8, losing to the McMaster Marauders in the OUA Final 4.

The 2011–12 regular season was more successful than the previous year. The Gee-Gees entered the OUA playoffs with a 13–9 record but were ousted by rival Ryerson Rams by 3 points in the semifinals. The Gee-Gees had a playoff-experienced mix of veteran and young players going into the 2012–13 season.

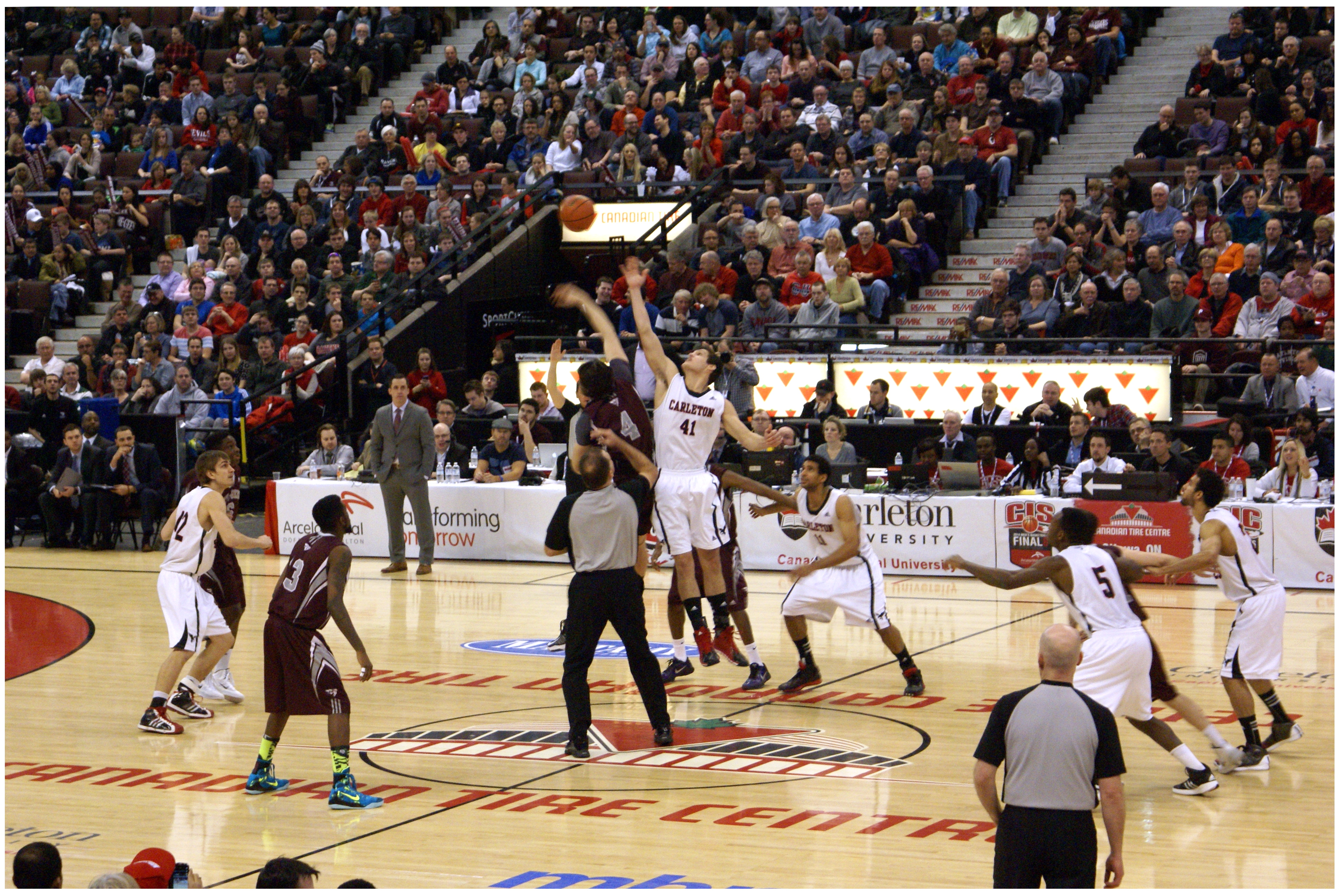
The Gee-Gees against the Ravens in the 2014 Championship game.

The Gee-Gees came into the 2012–13 season with the last chance to make a deep run with star Warren Ward and the rest of their graduating players.

Highly ranked nationally all season, the Gee-Gees posted a 15–5 regular-season record and were dead-set on making an appearance in the CIS tournament. The team lost to bitter cross-city rivals Carleton Ravens by 3 points in the OUA Wilson Cup final, still qualifying for the CIS Final 8 Tournament being held in Ottawa. The team lost to the Lakehead Thunderwolves in the national championship semifinals but defeated the Acadia Axemen to earn their first national medal in school history with a bronze.

The 2013–14 season was one of the best in school history with the play of star senior Johnny Berhanemeskel and star transfer Terry Thomas the Gee-Gees were ranked at #2 in the nation almost all season and posted a school-best 20–2 regular-season record with their two losses coming against nation's #1 Carleton. The Gee-Gees went into the OUA playoffs as the second seed and narrowly beat the Ryerson Rams to advance to the final four in Toronto. In the semifinals, Ottawa easily beat McMaster and advanced to the gold medal game against Carleton the following day. In the final, the Gee-Gees edged Carleton by a score of 78–77 to win their first Wilson Cup (basketball) in 21 years. The loss was Carleton's first against Canadian competition in 49 straight games. Sitting on seed 1 for the Final 8 in the W. P. McGee Trophy, the Gee-Gees advanced to the final game, beating the Saskatchewan Huskies and the Victoria Vikes. The second time this season facing Carleton, in the National Championship final game, the Gee-Gees lost this time, 79–67.

=== Football ===
Football at the University of Ottawa began in 1881, it was one of the first established football programs in Canada.

The Gee-Gees have appeared in five Vanier Cup championships, winning the national title in 1975 and 2000 and losing in 1970, 1980 and 1997. The team plays their games at TD Place Stadium. The Gee-Gees have also won a total of eight conference championships, including four Yates Cups and four Dunsmore Cups as the team split time between the OUA and OQIFC. conferences.

=== Men's hockey ===
The men's hockey program was formed in 1889. The team played in the Ottawa City Hockey League. The team was first known as "Garnet and Grey", as well as the other varsity athletic programs within the University of Ottawa. In the 1940s, all the varsity athletic programs became known as the "Gee-Gees", which was nicknamed by the media. The Gee-Gees had tremendous success in the 1980s. Despite, that the Gee-Gees have yet to win the University Cup. Ottawa's most memorable run took place in 2004, as the Gee-Gees ousted their rival UQTR Patriotes 2–1 in the OUA playoffs, and then advanced to the Queen's Cup, hosted by the University of Western Ontario. The Gee-Gees lost the OUA final to York, but they still earned a spot in the University Cup, held in Fredericton, New Brunswick, where the power-house UNB Varsity Reds played host to the tournament. However, the Gee-Gees failed to record a win and went home 0–2. Notably, it was the first time since 1985 that the Gee-Gees played in the University Cup.

The Gee-Gees are well known for their successful coaches like Mickey Goulet, who is the former head coach of the Italian National Men's Hockey Team, which participated in the 2006 Winter Olympics in Torino, Italy. Coaches like Michel Boucher, Tony Zappia, and Dave Leger.

The Gee-Gees played in several rinks before the current Minto Sports Complex, which was built on the site of the Minto Arena, the former Minto Skating Club facility, which was demolished in 2000. Ottawa has held games at the Sandy Hill Arena and the Robert Guertin Arena in Hull. The first rink was known as "College Yard", which was an outdoor rink in front of Tabaret Hall. The second venue for the Gee-Gees was the indoor Rideau Skating Rink, which was flooded during winter for the ice surface. The site on the corner of Waller Street and Laurier Avenue is now the Arts building at the University of Ottawa.

=== Ringette ===
While technically not considered a varsity team, Ottawa has a university ringette team which competes annually in the Canadian national University Challenge Cup.

=== Rowing ===
Rowing at the University of Ottawa was established in 1949 after the athletic department created the Physical Education Program for aspiring oarsmen. The Ottawa Rowing Club offered equipment and coaches and continues to host the team to this day.

GeeGees rowers have compete annually in the P.D. Ross Regatta. The regatta was first held in 1950, following the death of the regatta's namesake, and the race was structured as a duel between the men's eight crews from University of Ottawa and McMaster University. The annual race has since been modified to feature the top men's and women's crews from University of Ottawa and Carleton University. The P.D. Ross regatta is raced annually on the Rideau Canal between the Bank Street and Pretoria bridges in early September. At its peak the regatta hosted 10,000 spectators.

=== Women's rugby ===
Jen Boyd served as head coach from 2013-2023, leading the team to seven straight national medals as the first full-time head coach in women's rugby. The Gee-Gees rugby team finally won their first national championship in 2017 after defeating the Laval Rouge et Or by a score of 20–10. The following year the Gee-Gees would fall short, finishing third in the tournament by defeating Laval 20–19, after a perfect 7–0 season to claim the RSEQ championship. Boyd was replaced after an external investigation which led to the implementation of a new safe sport program and replaced with Duncan McNaughton prior to the 2023 season. McNaughton will retire following the 2024 season to make way for Canada Senior Women's Sevens head coach Jack Hanratty, who most recently won led the team to a silver medal at the Paris Olympics.

=== Women's soccer ===
The Gee-Gees women's soccer program was founded in 1994 by current head coach Steven Johnson. The team went on to become national champions in 1996, in just their third season of play, after which Johnson was recognized as CIAU coach of the year (an honour he would again receive in 2005). The team has also won CIS silver medals in 1997, 2000, 2003, and 2005 and CIS bronze medals in 2001 and 2006. They went on to win the OUA gold in 2014, and CIS bronze following in 2014 along with receiving the Ottawa Sports Award. They won OUA bronze in 2015.

The University of Ottawa women's soccer team became national champions on November 11, 2018, with a 2–1 victory over the Trinity Western Spartans in front of a home crowd. Miranda Smith scored the game-winning goal to bring the university its first national soccer title since 1996. This was their first finals appearance since 2005, led by long-time head coach Steve Johnson. The Gee-Gees finished atop the OUA East with a 14–1–1 record.

== Facilities ==
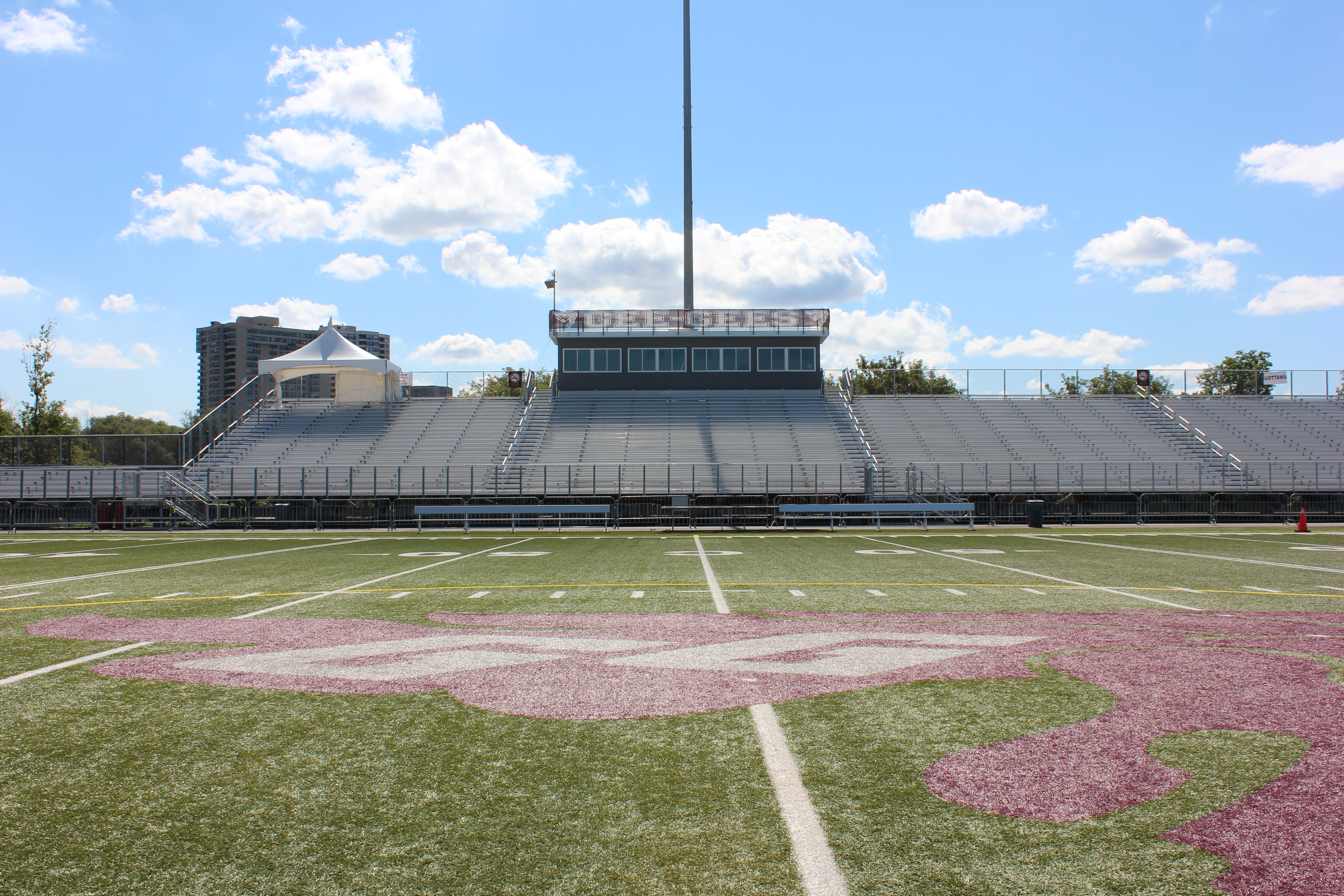
Gee-Gees Field, football venue

Venue	Sport(s)	Capacity	Open.
Gee-Gees Field	Football	4,152	2013
Montpetit Hall	Basketball; Volleyball; Swimming; Badminton; Water polo	1,000	1972
Matt Anthony Field	Soccer; Rugby	1,500	2001
Minto Sports Complex	Ice hockey	850	2001

== Awards and honours ==
=== Athletes of the Year ===
Gee Gees Athletes of the Year
Year	Female Athlete	Sport	Male Athlete	Sport	Ref.
2023–24	Natsuki Szczokin	Basketball	Hugo Lemesle	Swimming	
2022–23	Cassandra Provost	Soccer	Thomas Sénéchal-Becker	Track and Field	
2021–22	Alexandra Ondo	Rugby	Nicholas Mattinen	Hockey	
2019–20	Mikayla Morton	Soccer	Davide Casarin	Swimming	
2018–19	Miranda Smith	Soccer	Davide Casarin	Swimming	
2017–18	Dria Bennett	Rugby	Jackson Bennett	Football	
2016–17	Simone Savary	Rugby	Montana Champagne	Swimming	
2015–16	Devyani Biswal	Track and Field	Michael L'Africain	Basketball	
2014–15	Pilar Khoury	Soccer	Johnny Berhanemeskel	Basketball	
2013–14	Myriam English	Volleyball	Johnny Berhanemeskel	Basketball	
2012–13	Gillian Baggott	Soccer	Warren Ward	Basketball	
2011–12	Hannah Sunley-Paisley	Basketball	Michael Robertson	Track and Field	
2010–11	Tess Edwards	Volleyball	Brad Sinopoli	Football	
2009–10	Hannah Sunley-Paisley	Basketball	Christopher Greenaway; Josh Gibson-Bascombe	Track and Field; Basketball	
2008–09	Julia Tousaw	Track and Field	Josh Sacobie	Football	
2007–08	Christine Lamey	Volleyball	Josh Sacobie	Football	
2006–07	Christine Lamey	Volleyball	Josh Gibson-Bascombe	Basketball	
2005–06	Christine Lamey	Volleyball	Josh Sacobie	Football	
2004–05	Moriah Trowell	Basketball	Jermaine Campbell	Basketball	
2003–04	Melissa Abraham	Soccer	Louis David Bonneau	Swimming	
2002–03	Sarah Dillabaugh	Cross-Country	Marko Jovic	Basketball	
2001–02	Danielle Day	Soccer	Mark Pretzlaff	Football	
2000–01	Noel Trepannier	Soccer	Phill Côté	Football	
1999–00	Deanna Saracino	Soccer	Phill Côté	Football	
1997–98	Nathalie Coté	Track and Field & Cross-Country	Ousmane Tounkara	Football	
1996–97	Tania Singfield	Soccer	Chris Evraire	Football	
1995–96	Irene Enright	Fencing	Jean-François Rivard	Hockey	
1994–95	Julie Gareau	Soccer	Jean-François Rivard	Hockey	
1993–94	Fabienne Perrin	Basketball	Joey St. Aubin	Hockey	
1992–93	Fabienne Perrin	Basketball	Phil Comtois	Hockey	
1991–92	Nadine St. Louis	Badminton	Rod Lee	Basketball	
1990–91	Janice Haines	Volleyball	John Halvorsen	Cross-Country	
1989–90	Annette Saikaley	Volleyball	Chris Gioskos	Football	

== Notable alumni ==
Audra Vair (2003-2006)

- 2011 Pan American Games bronze (women's double) and silver (women's quadruple sculls) medalist

Andrew Todd (2009-2012)

- Paralympic Bronze Medalist in Rio 2016 in the mixed coxed four event
- Back to Back world champion in the PR3 Men's 2- in 2018 and 2019
- Competed at the Paralympics in Tokyo 2021

Kate Goodfellow (2009-2012)

- 2015 Pan Am Gold Medalist in the women's quadruple sculls
- Silver medalist in the women's quadruple sculls for team Canada at the 2013 World Rowing Championships in Chungju, Korea
- Raced the women's quadruple sculls for Canada at the 2014 World Rowing Championships
- Member of the women's eight that won the 2011 Under-23 World Rowing Championships and set a new world record time of 6:03.23

Jenna Pelham (2010-2013)

- Raced for Canada in the lightweight women's quadruple sculls at the 2016 World Rowing Championships

Christy Nurse (2012-2013)

- 6 time medalist at the FISA Sr. World Rowing Championships. She won bronze in the women's 8+ in 2013 and 2015, and silver in the women's 8+ in 2010, 2011 and 2014 as well as at the women's 4- in 2013.
- Named to Canada's 2012 and 2016 Olympic Teams
- Winner of the prestigious Remenham Challenge Cup at the Henley Royal Regatta in 2015

Kennedy Burrows (2020-2022)

- First women in Canadian University Rowing to win the lightweight and openweight women's single at OUAs and the subsequent lightweight women's single race at the CURC national championships in 2023
- Named OUA and CURC Female Athlete of the Year in 2023

Ali Mahmoud

- St. Patrick's High School (Ottawa)
- University of Ottawa Gee-Gees (2002, 2003)
- Lebanon National Basketball Program
- Sporting Al Riyadi Beirut (2004–present)
- 2006, 2010 FIBA World Championships

Alex McLeod

- University of Ottawa Gee-Gees (2002–2006)
- Over 1,207 career points
- OUA East Rookie Team (2002)
- OUA East All-Star (2004, 2005, 2006)
- Certified Canadian Lawyer

Joshua Gibson-Bascombe

- University of Ottawa Gee-Gees (2005–2010)
- OUA East Rookie of the Year (2005–2006)
- OUA East All-Star (2006, 2007, 2008, 2009)
- NH Ostrava of the Czech Republic
- Team Canada Men's Development Team
- FISU (2007 Thailand, 2009 Serbia)

Warren Ward

- University of Ottawa Gee-Gees (2008–2013)
- OUA East All-Rookie Team (2008–2009)
- OUA East All-Star (2009, 2010, 2012)
- Plays professionally for TBB Trier
- FISU (2011 China)

Terry Thomas

- University of Ottawa Gee-Gees (2013–2014)
- CIS All-Canadian Second Team (2012)
- CIS National Championship All-Tournament Team (2014)
- All OUA East Second Team (2014)
- CIS National Championship All-Tournament Team (2012)
- All-Atlantic Division First Team (2012)
- Atlantic Division All-Rookie Team (2011)
- Played professionally for the Hamburg Towers in Germany and in the NBL

Johnny Berhanemeskel

- Lester B. Pearson Catholic High School (Gloucester, Ontario)
- University of Ottawa Gee-Gees (2010–2015)
- Played professionally for the Ottawa Blackjacks (2020–2022)
- Played for Team Canada Senior Men's National Basketball Team
- CIS Outstanding Player (2015)
- First Team All-Canadian (2015)
- OUA Player of the Year (2015)
- Gee-Gees all-time leading scorer with 2000 points
- Gee-Gees all-time leader in three-point field-goals made (299)
- Gee-Gees all-time leader in playoff scoring (357 points) and playoff three-pointers made (53)
- Embarked on a professional career after graduation
