= Lethbridge Pronghorns =

University of Lethbridge athletic teams

- University: University of Lethbridge
- Nickname: Horns
- Association: U Sports
- Conference: Canada West; Prairie Division
- Athletic director: Neil Langevin
- Location: Lethbridge, Alberta
- Varsity teams: 7 (2 men's, 3 women's, 2 co-ed)
- Basketball arena: 1st Choice Savings Centre
- Soccer stadium: Community Sports Stadium
- Aquatics center: Max Bell Regional Aquatic Centre
- Other venues: Cavendish Farms Centre
- Colours: Blue (Royal) and white
- Mascot: Luxie
- Website: gohorns.ca
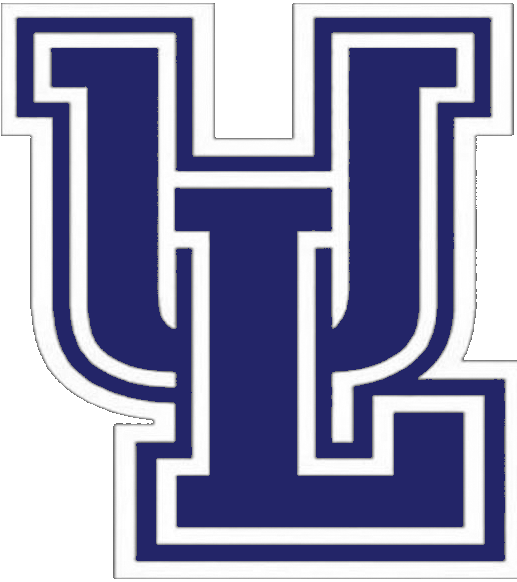

The Lethbridge Pronghorns are the athletic teams that represent the University of Lethbridge in Lethbridge, Alberta, Canada. They have men's and women's teams that compete in U Sports basketball, rugby union, soccer, swimming, and track and field. They competed in ice hockey until 2020. They are named after the pronghorn.

== Varsity teams ==
Men's sports	Women's sports
Basketball	Basketball
Soccer	Rugby
	Soccer
Co-ed sports
Swimming
Track and field

=== Basketball ===
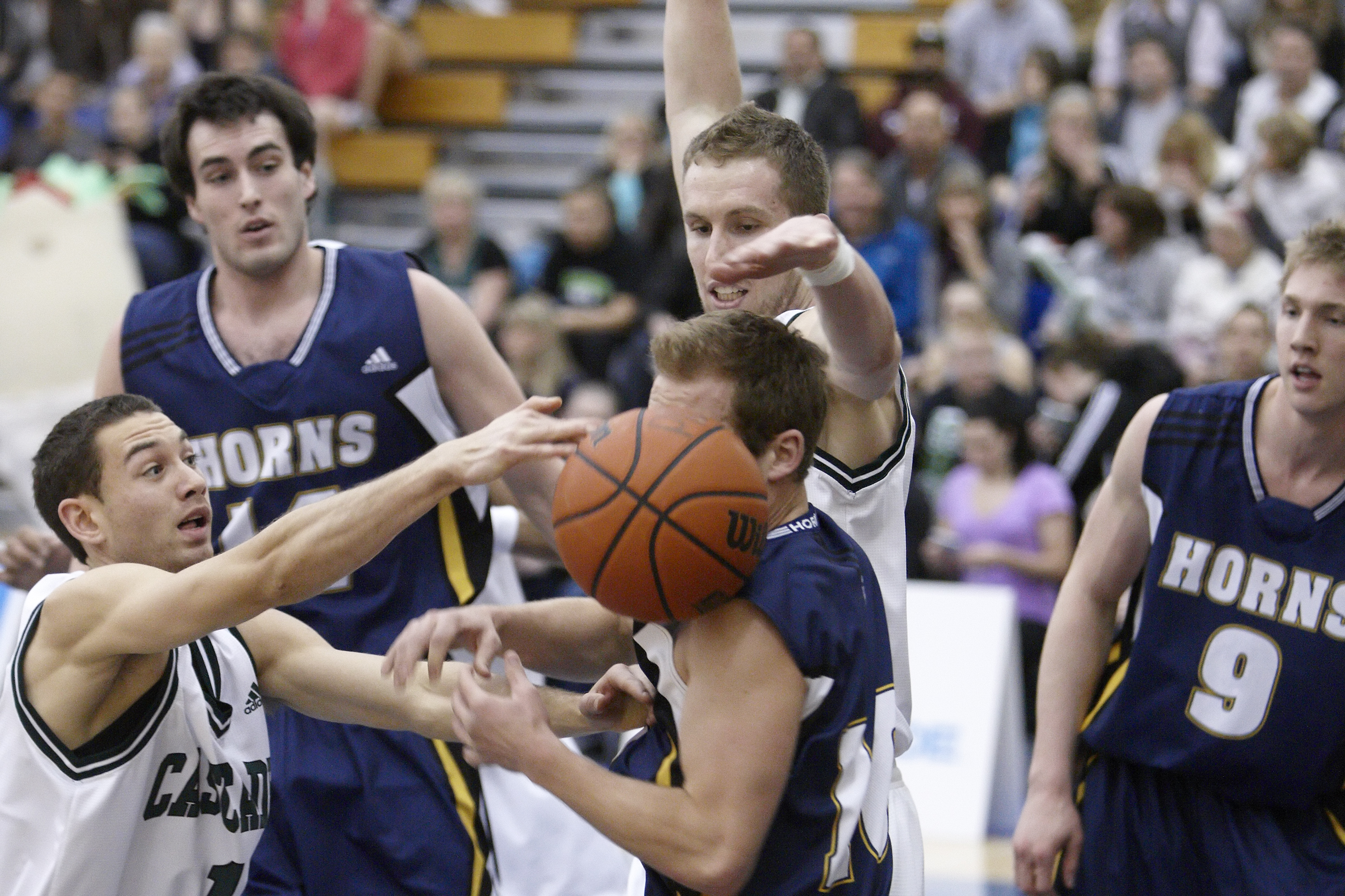
Men's basketball v UFV, 2012

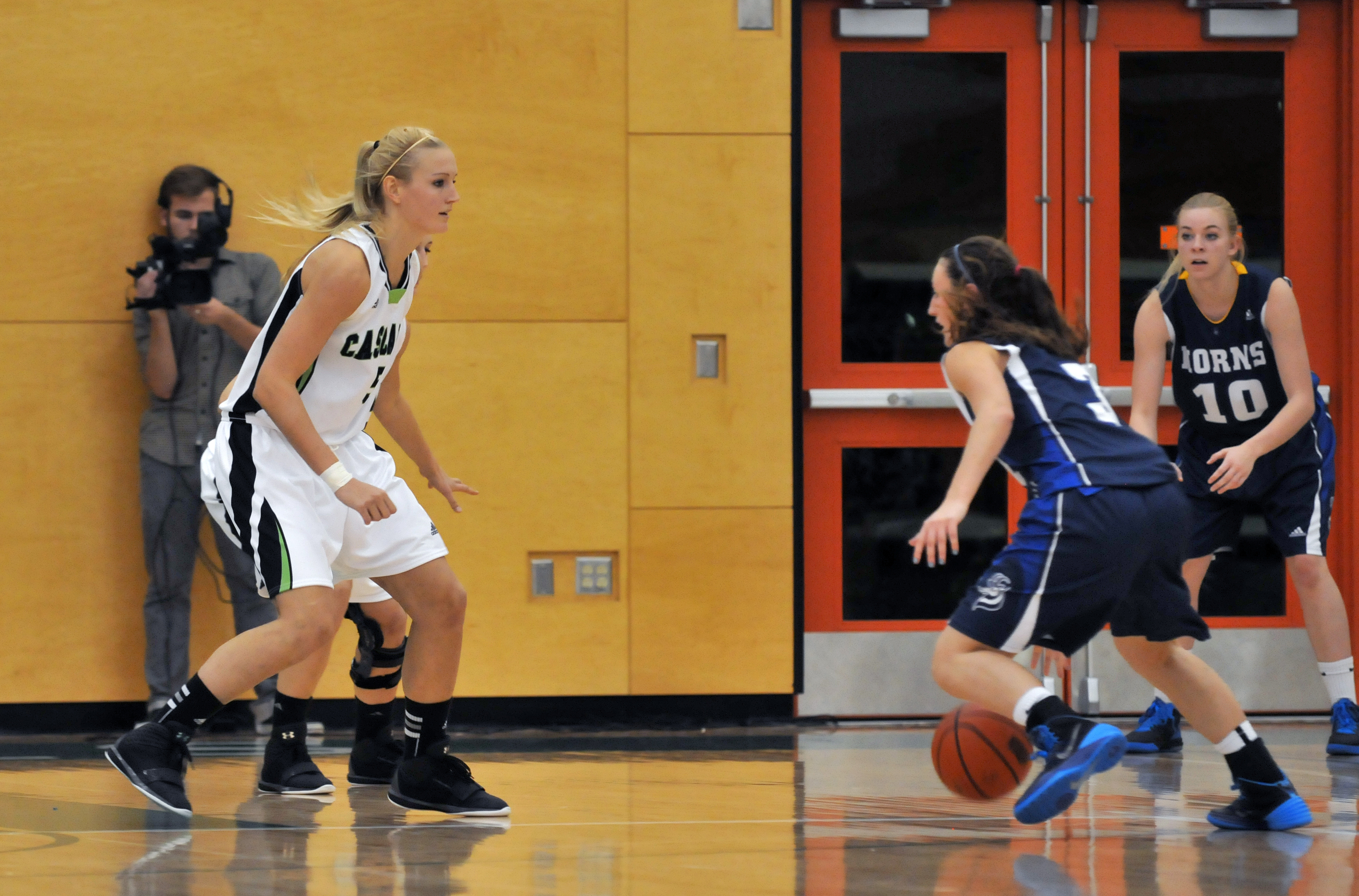
Women's basketball v UFV, 2013

Season	Men's		Women's	
Season	Wins	Losses	Wins	Losses
2012–13	12	10	10	12
2013–14	15	9	6	16
2014–15	7	13	4	16
2015–16	13	10	1	19
2016–17	16	9	5	15
2017–18	14	10	11	12
2018–19	14	10	15	10
2019–20	11	11	11	10
2020–21	Cancelled due to the COVID-19 pandemic.			
2021–22	9	9	12	8
2022–23	6	14	7	13
2023–24	4	16	12	19

=== Soccer ===
Season	Men's			Women's		
Season	Wins	Losses	Draws	Wins	Losses	Draws
2012	5	5	6	1	9	2
2013	2	11	1	0	10	2
2014	3	7	2	1	7	4
2015	5	5	2	2	10	3
2016	8	7	2	3	9	2
2017	2	10	2	6	7	2
2018	0	11	3	4	12	1
2019	0	11	3	1	7	6
2020	Cancelled due to COVID-19 pandemic.					
2021	0	8	2	2	9	1
2022	2	10	2	1	11	2
2023	4	6	5	1	11	0

=== Rugby ===
The most successful athletic program at the University of Lethbridge is the women's rugby team. The rugby team won the Molinex Trophy in 2007, 2008 and 2009. In addition to three National titles, the team has won a silver and bronze medal at the National tournament. Six consecutive Canada West titles have been won by the Pronghorns.

Season	Wins	Losses	Result
2009	4	0	Won CIS championship
2010	4	0	Won Canada West
2011	4	0	Won Canada West

=== Track and field ===
In the 2004–05 season, Jim Steacy remained undefeated in the weight throw versus CIS competition, claiming gold in both the Canada West and CIS Championships while breaking his own record in both events. For the first time in his CIS career, Steacy won both the Canada West and CIS shot put titles. For the second straight year he was named the CIS field athlete of the year at nationals.

=== Swimming ===
The University of Lethbridge swim team carries a long tradition of swimming into each new season. The 2004–05 season was one of their most successful.

Seven swimmers competed at the 2005 CIS championships in Edmonton. Rookie Richard Hortness won the 100-meter freestyle race with a time of 49.81 and placed second in the 50-meter free with a time of 22.89. Hortness was selected to become a member of the Canadian National Team and competed in Turkey in August 2005.

=== Judo ===
At the Alberta Judo Provincials in 2005, Tanner Mair topped the ten other competitors in his weight class to win the gold. In the blue and under 81 kg class, Mair won all his matches by throw (ippon). Mair also received the best technician award for the second consecutive year. In the 2004–05 season, Mair placed first in all six tournaments he entered.

== Former varsity teams ==
=== Ice hockey ===
In 1994, the men's team won the University Cup. The Pronghorns, in partnership with the City of Lethbridge, hosted the 2019 edition of the University Cup at the ENMAX Centre. The hockey program was discontinued in 2020.

Women's hockey
Season	Wins	Losses
2012–13	9	18
2013–14	7	18
2014–15	6	22
2015–16	13	14
2016–17	4	21
2017–18	5	20
2018–19	7	19

== Club teams ==
In addition to the varsity sports teams, the University of Lethbridge also hosts club teams for golf, ringette, curling, softball, and wrestling.

The ringuette team competes annually in the Canadian national University Challenge Cup.

== Awards and honors ==
=== Athletes of the Year ===
This is an incomplete list

Awards are given out at the university's annual Blue and Gold Banquet.

Year	Female athlete	Sport	Male athlete	Sport	Ref.
2010	Ashley Patzer	Rugby	Scott Bowles	Hockey	
2012	Crystal Patterson	Ice hockey	Jeff Nicol and Ryan Thornley	Swimming	
2015	Kim Veldman	Basketball	Peter Millman	Track and field	
2022	Jinaye Shomachuk	Track and field	Apollo Hess	Swimming	
2023	Jinaye Shomachuk	Track and field	Chris Alexander	Swimming	

=== Canada West Hall of Fame ===
- Women's Rugby Team, 2006–11: Canada West Hall of Fame – 2019 Inductee

=== U Sports Awards ===
- Ashley Patzer: U Sports National Rugby Championships Most Valuable Player (2008)
- Ashley Patzer: U Sports Rugby Rookie of the Year (2005)
- Ashley Patzer: U Sports Rugby Athlete of the Year (2006, 2009)

== International ==
The following Pronghorns student-athletes have played in international competition.

- Ashley Patzer Canada: Rugby – 2015 Pan American Games, 2016 Rio Summer Olympics
