= Karina Wilvers =

Argentine rower

Personal information
- Born: 5 March 1983 (age 43)

Sport
- Country: Argentina
- Sport: Rowing
Medal record
Representing Argentina
Pan American Games
Bronze medal – third place	2015 Toronto	W4x

Karina Wilvers (born 5 March 1983) is an Argentine rower. She competed in the women's double sculls and quadruple sculls at the 2015 Pan American Games.
