= Antje von Seydlitz-Kurzbach =

German-Canadian rower

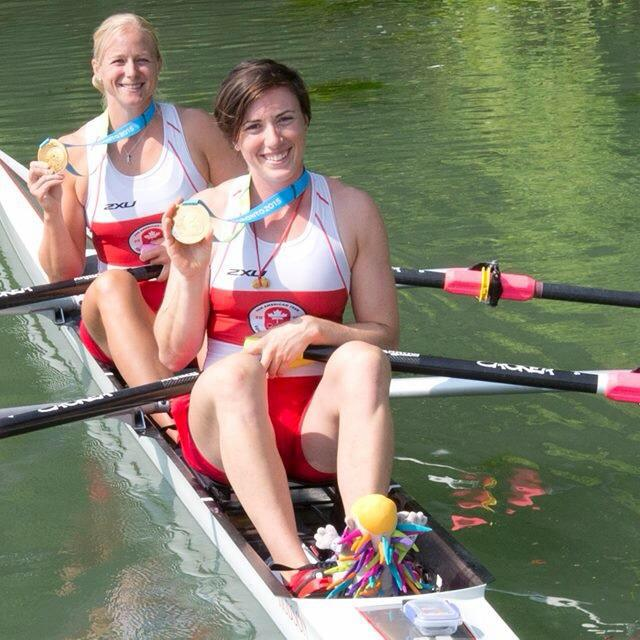
- von Seydlitz (front) at the 2015 Pan Am Games in Toronto with teammate Kerry Shaffer

Personal information
- Born: 16 September 1990 (age 36) Smithers, British Columbia, Canada
- Height: 179 cm (5 ft 10 in)
- Weight: 76 kg (168 lb)

Sport
- Sport: Rowing
Medal record
Women's rowing
Representing Canada
World Rowing Championships
Silver medal – second place	2013 Chungju	W4x
World Rowing U23 Championships
Gold medal – first place	2012 Trakai	Coxless four
Pan American Games
Gold medal – first place	2015 Toronto	Double sculls
Gold medal – first place	2015 Toronto	Quadruple sculls

Antje von Seydlitz-Kurzbach (born September 16, 1990) is a German-Canadian rower. She has competed at several World Rowing Cups, Championships, as well as the 2015 Pan American Games.

In June 2016, she was officially named to Canada's 2016 Olympic team.
