= U Sports women's rugby championship =

- Sport: Rugby union
- Founded: 1998; 28 years ago
- First season: 1998
- Organizing body: U Sports
- No. of teams: 26
- Country: Canada
- Most recent champion: Victoria Vikes (1st title)
- Most titles: Alberta Pandas (6); St. Francis Xavier X-Women (6)
- Website: usports.ca/en/championships/rugby/f

The U Sports Women's Rugby Championship, is a Canadian university rugby union tournament conducted by U Sports, and determines the women's national champion. The tournament involves the champions from each of Canada's four regional sports conferences. The Monilex Trophy is awarded to the winners.

The first women's rugby union championship was held in November 1998. The tournament features eight teams playing in a single-elimination format, which takes place over four days and features 11 games at a single, predetermined host site. The trophy was donated by Monilex Sports, the official Canadian distributor of Gilbert Rugby balls. The 2020 championship tournament was cancelled due to the COVID-19 pandemic.

== Champions ==
Year	Champion	Score	Runner up	Host	City
1998	Guelph Gryphons	15–10	McMaster Marauders	McMaster	Hamilton, ON
1999	Alberta Pandas	20–3	Guelph Gryphons	Guelph	Guelph, ON
2000	Alberta Pandas (2)	28–5	McGill Martlets	Bishop's	Lennoxville, QC
2001	Alberta Pandas (3)	22–7	Waterloo Warriors	Ottawa	Ottawa, ON
2002	Alberta Pandas (4)	38–6	Western Mustangs	Toronto	Toronto, ON
2003	Alberta Pandas (5)	20–3	Lethbridge Pronghorns	Alberta	Edmonton, AB
2004	Western Mustangs	12–8	Toronto Varsity Blues	AUS	Halifax, NS
2005	Western Mustangs (2)	22–0	Alberta Pandas	Victoria	Victoria, BC
2006	St. Francis Xavier X-Women	10–5	Guelph Gryphons	Western	London, ON
2007	Lethbridge Pronghorns	15–10	Western Mustangs	Western	London, ON
2008	Lethbridge Pronghorns (2)	29–15	St. Francis Xavier X-Women	Lethbridge	Lethbridge, AB
2009	Lethbridge Pronghorns (3)	20–3	St. Francis Xavier X-Women	UBC	Vancouver, BC
2010	St. Francis Xavier X-Women (2)	17–12	Concordia Stingers	Trent	Peterborough, ON
2011	Guelph Gryphons (2)	28–0	St. Francis Xavier X-Women	Trent	Peterborough, ON
2012	St. Francis Xavier X-Women (3)	37–0	Guelph Gryphons	St. Francis Xavier	Antigonish, NS
2013	Alberta Pandas (6)	29–10	Guelph Gryphons	Laval	Quebec City, QC
2014	St. Francis Xavier X-Women (4)	43–34	McMaster Marauders	Guelph	Guelph, ON
2015	McMaster Marauders	27–3	Queen's Gaels	Queen's	Kingston, ON
2016	St. Francis Xavier X-Women (5)	27–19	Ottawa Gee-Gees	Victoria	Victoria, BC
2017	Ottawa Gee-Gees	20–10	Laval Rouge et Or	Lethbridge	Lethbridge, AB
2018	St. Francis Xavier X-Women (6)	41–24	Guelph Gryphons	Acadia	Wolfville, NS
2019	Laval Rouge et Or	22–14	Queen's Gaels	Ottawa	Ottawa, ON
2020	2020 game cancelled due to 2019 coronavirus pandemic				
2021	Queen's Gaels	26–18	Ottawa Gee-Gees	Queen's	Kingston, ON
2022	Laval Rouge et Or (2)	22–5	Queen's Gaels	Victoria	Victoria, BC
2023	Laval Rouge et Or (3)	22–5	Victoria Vikes	Laval	Quebec City, QC
2024	UBC Thunderbirds	8–3	Victoria Vikes	UPEI	Charlottetown, PE
2025	UBC Thunderbirds (2)	15–13	Victoria Vikes	UBC	Vancouver, BC
2026	Victoria Vikes	17–0	UBC Thunderbirds	Guelph	Guelph, ON
2027				Ottawa	Ottawa, ON
