= Miranda Smith =

Canadian soccer player (born 1996)

Personal information
- Date of birth: March 26, 1996 (age 30)
- Place of birth: Ottawa, Ontario, Canada
- Height: 5 ft 2 in (1.57 m)
- Position: Midfielder

Youth career
- Gloucester Hornets SC
- Cumberland United SC
- Capital United SC

College career
Years	Team	Apps	(Gls)
2014–2016	Memphis Tigers	44	(1)
2017–2018	Ottawa Gee-Gees	28	(4)

Senior career*
Years	Team	Apps	(Gls)
2017	West Ottawa SC	9	(0)
2020	TPS	7	(0)
2021	Þór/KA	5	(0)
2021–2022	Fleury	0	(0)
2023	Ottawa South United		
2023–2024	Maccabi Kishronot Hadera		
2024	Ottawa South United	9	(0)
2025	Ottawa Rapid	4	(0)

International career
2019	Canada Universiade	4	(0)
- * Club domestic league appearances and goals as of October 17, 2025

Miranda Smith (born March 25, 1996) is a Canadian soccer player.

== Early life ==
Smith played youth soccer with the Gloucester Hornets SC, Cumberland United SC, and Capital United SC. She also began playing for the Ontario provincial team at age 13 and joined the National Training Centre program at age 15. In 2013, she won a bronze medal with Team Ontario at the 2013 Canada Summer Games.

== Collegiate career ==
In 2014, Smith began attending the University of Memphis, where she played for the women's soccer team. On October 23, 2016, she scored her first collegiate goal in a victory over the Houston Cougars.

In 2017, after departing Memphis, she contemplated ending her soccer career, before returning to Canada to attend the University of Ottawa and play for the Ottawa Gee-Gees. At the end of the 2017 season, she was named an OUA East First Team All-Star and an Academic All-Canadian. In 2018, she helped them win the U Sports women's soccer championship, scoring the winning goal in the final, and was named the tournament MVP. At the end of the season, she was again named an OUA East First Team All-Star and Academic All-Canadian. She was also named the University of Ottawa Varsity Athletes of the Year that year. In 2019, she returned to the team after the conclusion of their league season (as she had finished her OUA eligibility) to participate in the inaugural FISU University World Cup (which they qualified for as 2018 Canadian University Championship), helping them win the world title.

== Club career ==
In 2017, Smith played with West Ottawa SC in League1 Ontario.

In September 2020, Smith signed with Finish Kansallinen Liiga club TPS for the remainder of the season.

In March 2021, she signed with Icelandic Besta deild kvenna club Þór/KA. In July 2021, she departed the club.

In September 2021, Smith signed with French Première Ligue club Fleury.

In 2023, she played with Ottawa South United in Ligue1 Québec.

In September 2023, she signed with Israel club Maccabi Kishronot Hadera.

In 2024, she again played with Ottawa South United in Ligue1 Québec.

In January 2025, she signed with Northern Super League club Ottawa Rapid FC.

== International career ==
In 2019, she was named to the Canada Universiade team for the 2019 Summer Universiade.
