= Canoeing at the 2015 Pan American Games – Women's K-1 500 metres =

Women's K-1 500 metres at the 2015 Pan American Games
- Venue: Welland Pan Am Flatwater Centre
- Dates: July 11–13
- Competitors: 11 from 11 nations
- Winning time: 2:00.656

Medalists
Gold medal	Yusmari Mengana	Cuba
Silver medal	Michelle Russell	Canada
Bronze medal	Ana Paula Vergutz	Brazil

The women's K-1 500 metres canoeing event at the 2015 Pan American Games will be held between the 11 and 13 of July at the Welland Pan Am Flatwater Centre in Welland.

== Schedule ==
The following is the competition schedule for the event:

All times are Eastern Daylight Time (UTC−4)

Date	Time	Round
July 11, 2015	11:00	Heat 1
July 11, 2015	11:10	Heat 2
July 11, 2015	12:15	Semi-final
July 13, 2015	11:35	Final

== Results ==
=== Heats ===
Qualification Rules: 1..3->Final, 4..7 and 8th best time->Semifinals, Rest Out

==== Heat 1 ====
Rank	Athletes	Country	Time	Notes
1	Yusmari Mengana	Cuba	1:52.671	F
2	Michelle Russell	Canada	1:53.794	F
3	Maggie Hogan	United States	1:57.632	F
4	Rosa Hinojosa	Mexico	2:05.279	SF
5	Melissa Reyes	Puerto Rico	2:06.734	SF
6	Jeanarett Valenzuela Soto	Chile	2:08.164	SF

==== Heat 2 ====
Rank	Athletes	Country	Time	Notes
1	Ana Paula Vergutz	Brazil	1:54.909	F
2	Tatiana Muñoz	Colombia	1:59.079	F
3	Martina Isequilla	Argentina	2:00.098	F
4	Stefanie Perdomo Vinces	Ecuador	2:01.930	SF
5	Mara Guerrero Gil	Venezuela	2:07.832	SF

=== Semifinal ===
Qualification Rules: 1..3->Final, Rest Out

Rank	Athletes	Country	Time	Notes
1	Rosa Hinojosa	Mexico	2:03.383	F
2	Stefanie Perdomo Vinces	Ecuador	2:05.459	F
3	Melissa Reyes	Puerto Rico	2:06.818	F
4	Mara Guerrero Gil	Venezuela	2:08.211	
5	Jeanarett Valenzuela Soto	Chile	2:08.233	

=== Final ===
Rank	Athletes	Country	Time	Notes
1st place, gold medalist(s)	Yusmari Mengana	Cuba	2:00.656	
2nd place, silver medalist(s)	Michelle Russell	Canada	2:02.381	
3rd place, bronze medalist(s)	Ana Paula Vergutz	Brazil	2:03.329	
4	Maggie Hogan	United States	2:06.013	
5	Martina Isequilla	Argentina	2:11.145	
6	Stefanie Perdomo Vinces	Ecuador	2:11.713	
7	Rosa Hinojosa	Mexico	2:12.191	
8	Tatiana Muñoz	Colombia	2:14.300	
9	Melissa Reyes	Puerto Rico	2:17.128	
