= Canoeing at the 2015 Pan American Games – Men's C-2 1000 metres =

Men's C-2 1000 metres at the 2015 Pan American Games
- Venue: Welland Pan Am Flatwater Centre
- Dates: July 13
- Competitors: 12 from 6 nations
- Winning time: 3:46.316

Medalists
Gold medal	Benjamin Russell; Gabriel Beauchesne-Sévigny	Canada
Silver medal	Erlon Silva; Isaquias Queiroz	Brazil
Bronze medal	Serguey Torres; José Carlos Bulnes	Cuba

The men's C-2 1000 metres canoeing event at the 2015 Pan American Games will be held between the 11 and 13 of July at the Welland Pan Am Flatwater Centre in Welland.

== Schedule ==
The following is the competition schedule for the event:

All times are Eastern Daylight Time (UTC−4)

Date	Time	Round
July 13, 2015	11:05	Final

== Results ==
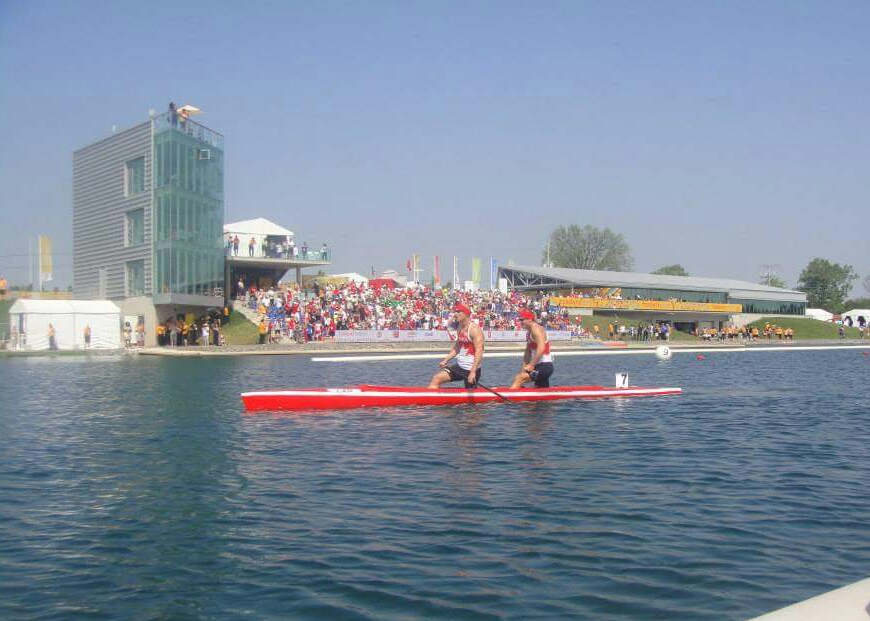
Benjamin Russell and Gabriel Beauchesne-Sévigny of Canada after the gold medal race

=== Final ===
Rank	Athletes	Country	Time	Notes
1st place, gold medalist(s)	Benjamin Russell; Gabriel Beauchesne-Sévigny	Canada	3:46.316	
2nd place, silver medalist(s)	Erlon de Souza Silva; Isaquias Queiroz	Brazil	3:47.117	
3rd place, bronze medalist(s)	Serguey Torres; José Carlos Bulnes	Cuba	3:49.932	
4	Adolfo Cámara; Everardo Cristóbal	Mexico	3:53.288	
5	Edwar Paredes; Jose Solano Perez	Venezuela	4:08.764	
6	Jose Tafra; Johnnathan Tafra	Chile	4:12.817	
