= Canoeing at the 2015 Pan American Games – Women's K-1 200 metres =

Women's K-1 200 metres at the 2015 Pan American Games
- Venue: Welland Pan Am Flatwater Centre
- Dates: July 12–14
- Competitors: 11 from 11 nations
- Winning time: 42.946

Medalists
Gold medal	Yusmari Mengana	Cuba
Silver medal	Michelle Russell	Canada
Bronze medal	Sabrina Ameghino	Argentina

The women's K-1 200 metres canoeing event at the 2015 Pan American Games will be held between the 12 and 14 of July at the Welland Pan Am Flatwater Centre in Welland.

== Schedule ==
The following is the competition schedule for the event:

All times are Eastern Daylight Time (UTC−4)

Date	Time	Round
July 12, 2015	10:50	Heat 1
July 12, 2015	10:57	Heat 2
July 12, 2015	11:51	Semi-finals
July 14, 2015	10:40	Final

== Results ==
=== Heats ===
Qualification Rules: 1..3->Final, 4..7 and 8th best time->Semifinals, Rest Out

==== Heat 1 ====
Rank	Athletes	Country	Time	Notes
1	Yusmari Mengana	Cuba	42.038	F
2	Michelle Russell	Canada	42.960	F
3	Maricela Montemayor	Mexico	45.284	F
4	Kaitlyn McElroy	United States	45.439	SF
5	Melissa Reyes	Puerto Rico	46.247	SF
6	Jeanarett Valenzuela Soto	Chile	47.865	SF

==== Heat 2 ====
Rank	Athletes	Country	Time	Notes
1	Sabrina Ameghino	Argentina	44.493	F
2	Zulmarys Sánchez	Venezuela	45.838	F
3	Stefanie Perdomo Vinces	Ecuador	46.261	F
4	Edileia Matos Dos Reis	Brazil	46.384	SF
5	Tatiana Muñoz	Colombia	46.398	SF

=== Semifinal ===
Qualification Rules: 1..3->Final, Rest Out

Rank	Athletes	Country	Time	Notes
1	Kaitlyn McElroy	United States	45.710	F
2	Tatiana Muñoz	Colombia	45.809	F
3	Edileia Matos Dos Reis	Brazil	45.907	F
4	Melissa Reyes	Puerto Rico	46.228	
5	Jeanarett Valenzuela Soto	Chile	47.795	

=== Final ===
Rank	Athletes	Country	Time	Notes
1st place, gold medalist(s)	Yusmari Mengana	Cuba	42.946	
2nd place, silver medalist(s)	Michelle Russell	Canada	44.152	
3rd place, bronze medalist(s)	Sabrina Ameghino	Argentina	44.759	
4	Zulmarys Sánchez	Venezuela	45.556	
5	Edileia Matos Dos Reis	Brazil	46.074	
6	Kaitlyn McElroy	United States	46.827	
7	Stefanie Perdomo Vinces	Ecuador	47.415	
8	Tatiana Muñoz	Colombia	48.037	
9	Maricela Montemayor	Mexico	48.218	
