= Rowing at the 2015 Pan American Games – Women's double sculls =

Rowing – Women's double sculls at the 2015 Pan American Games
- Venue: Royal Canadian Henley Rowing Course
- Dates: July 11 - July 13
- Competitors: 12 from 6 nations
- Winning time: 7:13.01

Medalists
Gold medal	Kerry Maher-Shaffer; Antje von Seydlitz	Canada
Silver medal	Nicole Ritchie; Lindsay Meyer	United States
Bronze medal	Aimee Hernandez; Yariulvis Cobas	Cuba

The women's double sculls rowing event at the 2015 Pan American Games was held from July 11–13 at the Royal Canadian Henley Rowing Course in St. Catharines.

== Schedule ==
All times are Eastern Standard Time (UTC-3).

Date	Time	Round
July 11, 2015	9:05	Heat
July 13, 2015	9:25	Final

== Results ==
=== Heat ===
Rank	Rowers	Country	Time	Notes
1	Kerry Maher-Shaffer; Antje von Seydlitz	Canada	7:01.73	F
2	Nicole Ritchie; Lindsay Meyer	United States	7:07.61	F
3	Maria Laura Abalo; Karina Wilvers	Argentina	7:12.62	F
4	Aimee Hernandez; Yariulvis Cobas	Cuba	7:24.91	F
5	Soraya Jadue; Josefa Vila	Chile	7:33.70	F
6	Gabriela Cardozo de Almeida Salles; Yanka Vieira Rodrigues de Britto	Brazil	7:57.88	F

=== Final ===
Rank	Rowers	Country	Time	Notes
1st place, gold medalist(s)	Kerry Maher-Shaffer; Antje von Seydlitz	Canada	7:13.01	
2nd place, silver medalist(s)	Nicole Ritchie; Lindsay Meyer	United States	7:14.65	
3rd place, bronze medalist(s)	Aimee Hernandez; Yariulvis Cobas	Cuba	7:20.00	
4	Maria Laura Abalo; Karina Wilvers	Argentina	7:31.31	
5	Soraya Jadue; Josefa Vila	Chile	7:31.75	
6	Gabriela Cardozo de Almeida Salles; Yanka Vieira Rodrigues de Britto	Brazil	7:38.09	
