= Canoeing at the 2015 Pan American Games – Men's C-1 1000 metres =

Men's C-1 1000 metres at the 2015 Pan American Games
- Venue: Welland Pan Am Flatwater Centre
- Dates: July 13
- Competitors: 7 from 7 nations
- Winning time: 4:07.866

Medalists
Gold medal	Isaquias Queiroz	Brazil
Silver medal	Mark Oldershaw	Canada
Bronze medal	Everardo Cristóbal	Mexico

The men's C-1 1000 metres canoeing event at the 2015 Pan American Games will be held between the 11 and 13 of July at the Welland Pan Am Flatwater Centre in Welland.

== Schedule ==
The following is the competition schedule for the event:

All times are Eastern Daylight Time (UTC−4)

Date	Time	Round
July 13, 2015	9:50	Final

== Results ==
=== Final ===
Rank	Athletes	Country	Time	Notes
1st place, gold medalist(s)	Isaquias Queiroz	Brazil	4:07.866	
2nd place, silver medalist(s)	Mark Oldershaw	Canada	4:09.587	
3rd place, bronze medalist(s)	Everardo Cristóbal	Mexico	4:14.572	
4	Rolexis Baez	Cuba	4:20.164	
5	Sergio Díaz	Colombia	4:20.547	
6	Facundo Pagiola	Argentina	4:36.815	
7	Ariel Jimenez	Dominican Republic	4:55.629	
