= Wrestling at the 2015 Pan American Games – Women's freestyle 58 kg =

Women's Freestyle 58 kg at the 2015 Pan American Games
- Venue: Mississauga Sports Centre
- Dates: July 16
- Competitors: 8 from 8 nations

Medalists
Gold medal	Joice Silva	Brazil
Silver medal	Yaquelin Estornell	Cuba
Bronze medal	Lissette Antes	Ecuador
Bronze medal	Yanet Sovero	Peru

The women's freestyle 58 kg competition of the Wrestling events at the 2015 Pan American Games in Toronto were held on July 16 at the Mississauga Sports Centre.

== Schedule ==
All times are Eastern Daylight Time (UTC-4).

Date	Time	Round
July 16, 2015	16:05	Quarterfinals
July 16, 2015	17:17	Semifinals
July 16, 2015	22:20	Bronze medal matches
July 16, 2015	22:38	Final

== Results ==
=== Final ===
Quarterfinals		Semifinals		Finals
Yaquelin Estornell (CUB)	5
Lissette Antes (ECU)	5	Yaquelin Estornell (CUB)	4
Michelle Fazzari (CAN)	5	Sandra Roa (COL)	4
Sandra Roa (COL)	8			Yaquelin Estornell (CUB)	5
Yanet Sovero (PER)	3			Joice Silva (BRA)	6
Betzabeth Sarco (VEN)	2	Yanet Sovero (PER)	3
Joice Silva (BRA)	2	Joice Silva (BRA)	5
Alejandra Romero (MEX)	1

=== Repechage ===
Bronze medal match
Lissette Antes (ECU)	12
Sandra Roa (COL)	1
Alejandra Romero (MEX)	6
Yanet Sovero (PER)	6
