= Michelle Russell =

Canadian sprint kayaker

Personal information
- Born: June 27, 1992 (age 34) Dartmouth, Nova Scotia, Canada

Sport
- Sport: Kayaking
- Events: K-1 500m, K-1 200m
- Club: Cheema Aquatic Club
Medal record
Representing Canada
Pan American Games
Gold medal – first place	2015 Toronto	K-4 500 metres
Gold medal – first place	2023 Santiago	K-1 500 metres
Silver medal – second place	2015 Toronto	K-1 200 metres
Silver medal – second place	2015 Toronto	K-1 500 metres
U23 World Championships
Gold medal – first place	2013 Welland, Ontario	K-1 200 m
Bronze medal – third place	2013 Welland, Ontario	K-1 500 m
Representing Nova Scotia
Canada Games
Gold medal – first place	2009 Charlottetown	K-2 1000 m
Gold medal – first place	2009 Charlottetown	K-4 500 m
Silver medal – second place	2009 Charlottetown	K-1 2000 m
Silver medal – second place	2009 Charlottetown	K-1 1000 m

Michelle Russell (born June 27, 1992) is a Canadian sprint kayaker.

== Career ==
Her home club is the Cheema Aquatic Club in Fall River, Nova Scotia, Canada. As a 17-year-old at the 2009 Canada Games Russell represented Nova Scotia where she won two gold medals in K-4 and K-2, as well as two silver medals in K-1 1000 and K-1 2000 m. That very same year, Russell was picked as the female K-1, to represent Canada at the 2009 Junior Worlds in Moscow Russia, where she finished 8th and 10th in the K-1 500 and K-1 1000. 2012 was her first World Cup tour where she took home a bronze in K1 200 relay. In 2013, she made four World Cup finals in K1 events and placed fourteenth in K1 200 at Senior Worlds. At the 2013 Under-23 World Championships in Welland she paddled to victory for Canada and claimed the gold medal in the K-1 200m, as well as receiving a bronze medal in the K-1 500. She has also won numerous medals at the national level. In 2014, she once again made the Canadian Senior Worlds team that competed in two World Cup events, as well as the senior World Championships in Moscow, Russia. At World Cup event in Racice, she placed 8th in K-1 5000 and 12th in K-1 200. At the World Cup in Szeged, she placed 15th in the K-1 5000, 15th in the K-1 200. At the World Championship, she raced the K-1 200 relay event where she and her team placed 7th, as well as racing the K-1 200 event where she placed 13th and the K-2 500 event where she also placed 13th. She is currently on the World Top Athlete list for Canoe Kayak as of 2013, which meant she has one of the best times ever recorded by a female kayaker at a world level (Wellen, 2013). Her time 39,980 seconds, is the 8th fastest at the 200m distance ever recorded by a female kayaker. As of 2014, she is still on the list but is ranked at 9th. She is currently a member of the Canoe Kayak Canada Senior National team.

In March 2021, Russell was named to Canada's 2020 Olympic team. Russell participated in the 2024 Summer Olympic Games.

== Results ==
- 2013 U23 World Championships (Welland, Canada) K1 200 – Gold
- 2013 U23 World Championships (Welland, Canada) K1 500 – Bronze
- 2013 World Championships (Duisburg, Germany) K1 200 – 14th
- 2013 World Cup 3 (Poznan, Poland) K1 200 – 6th
- 2013 World Cup 3 (Poznan, Poland) K1 500 – 7th
- 2013 World Cup 3 (Racice, Czech Republic) K1 200 – 9th
- 2013 World Cup 3 (Racice, Czech Republic) K1 500 – 9th
- 2009 Junior World Championships (Moscow, Russia) K4 500 – 8th
- 2009 Junior World Championships (Moscow, Russia) K1 1000 – 10th
