= Joice Silva =

Brazilian freestyle wrestler

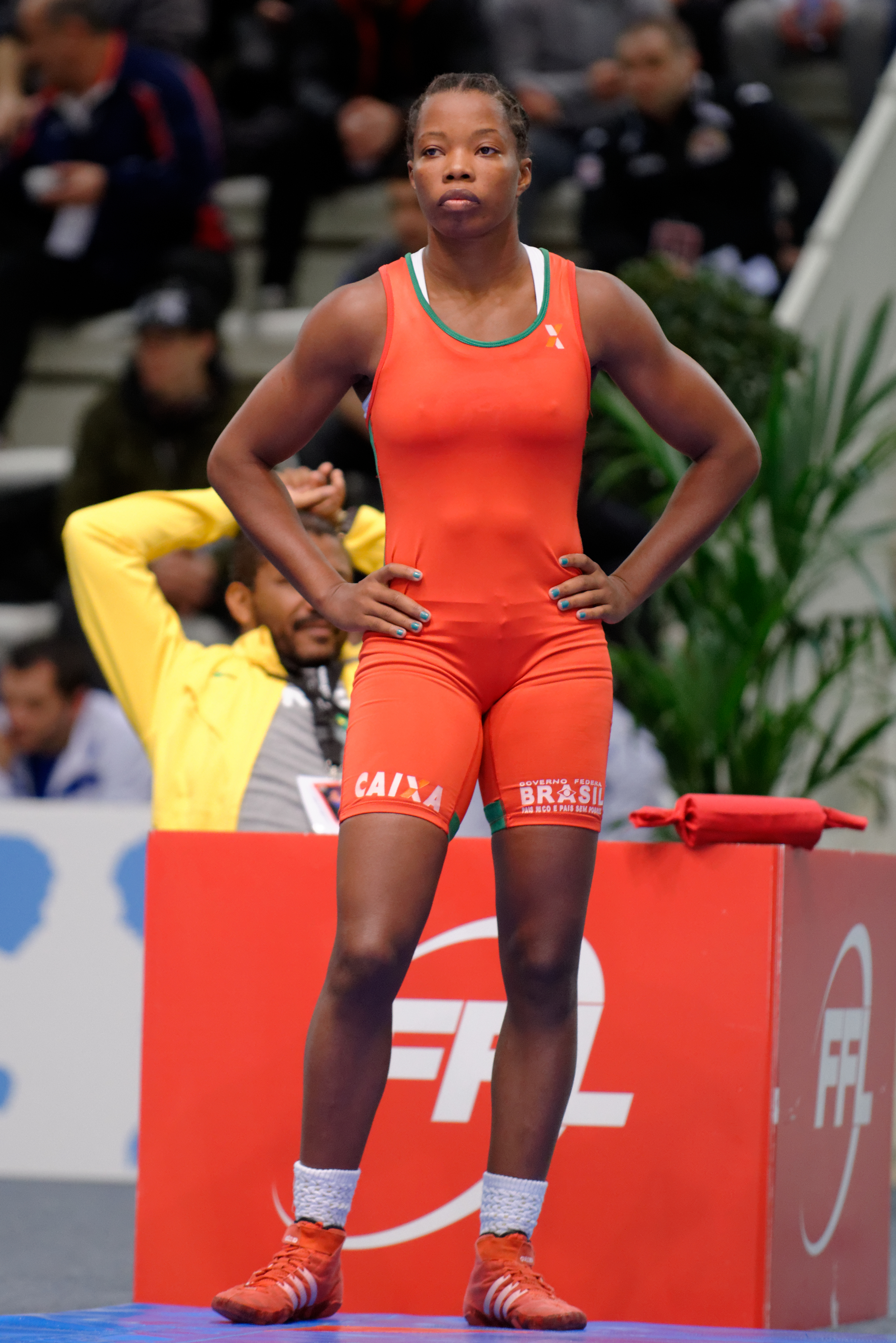
- Silva in 2014

Personal information
- Full name: Joice Souza da Silva
- Born: 20 July 1983 (age 43) Rio de Janeiro, Brazil
- Height: 167 cm (5 ft 6 in)

Sport
- Country: Brazil
- Sport: Freestyle wrestling
- Weight class: 55–59 kg (121–130 lb)
Medal record
Pan American Games
Gold medal – first place	2015 Toronto	58 kg
Bronze medal – third place	2011 Guadalajara	55 kg
Pan American Championships
Gold medal – first place	2015 Santiago	58 kg
Silver medal – second place	2010 Monterrey	59 kg
Silver medal – second place	2013 Panama City	59 kg
Bronze medal – third place	2005 Guatemala City	55 kg
Bronze medal – third place	2006 Rio de Janeiro	55 kg
Bronze medal – third place	2009 Maracaibo	59 kg
Bronze medal – third place	2011 Rionegro	55 kg
South American Games
Silver medal – second place	2010 Medellin	59 kg
Bronze medal – third place	2006 Buenos Aires	55 kg
South American Championships
Gold medal – first place	2009 Lima	59 kg

Joice Souza da Silva (born 20 July 1983) is a Brazilian freestyle wrestler.

== Career ==
Joice Silva competed in the freestyle 55 kg event at the 2012 Summer Olympics and was eliminated by Valeria Zholobova in the 1/8 finals.

Silva became the first Brazilian gold medalist in wrestling at the 2015 Pan American Games in Toronto, Ontario, Canada.
