= Gabriel Beauchesne-Sévigny =

Canadian canoeist (born 1984)

Personal information
- Nickname: OAG - Olympic Athlete Gabriel
- Born: 11 December 1984 (age 41) Montreal, Canada

Sport
- Sport: Canoeing
Medal record
Representing Canada
World Championships
Bronze medal – third place	2013 Duisburg	4 x C–1 200 m
Pan American Games
Gold medal – first place	2015 Toronto	C-2 1000 m

Gabriel Beauchesne-Sévigny (born December 11, 1984, in Montreal) is a Canadian sprint canoeist who has competed since the late 2000s. At the 2008 Summer Olympics in Beijing, he finished fifth in the C-2 500 m event and sixth in the C-2 1000 m event.

His sister Geneviève Beauchesne-Sévigny is also a sprint canoer, who has represented Canada at the Olympics.
