= Yusmari Mengana =

Cuban canoeist (born 1993)

Personal information
- Born: 25 October 1993 (age 32) Nueva Gerona, Cuba

Sport
- Sport: Canoe sprint
Medal record
Women's canoe sprint
Representing Cuba
Pan American Games
Gold medal – first place	2015 Toronto	K-1 200 m
Gold medal – first place	2015 Toronto	K-1 500 m
Gold medal – first place	2015 Toronto	K-2 500 m

Yusmari Mengana (born 25 October 1993) is a Cuban canoeist. She competed in the women's K-1 200 metres event at the 2016 Summer Olympics. Mengana won three of the five available gold medals in the women's canoe/kayak events at the 2015 Pan American Games in Toronto, Canada.
