= Rugby sevens at the 2015 Pan American Games – Men's tournament =

Rugby sevens – Men's tournament at the 2015 Pan American Games
- Venue: Exhibition Stadium
- Dates: July 11 – July 12
- Competitors: 96 from 8 nations

Medalists
Gold medal	Canada
Silver medal	Argentina
Bronze medal	United States

The men's rugby sevens tournament at the 2015 Pan American Games in Toronto, Canada was held at the Exhibition Stadium from July 11 to 12.

For the 2015 Pan American Games, the men's rugby sevens competition consisted of an 8-team tournament. The teams were grouped into two pools of four teams each for a round-robin preliminary round. All eight teams advanced to the knockout round.

Canada are the defending champions from the 2011 Pan American Games in Guadalajara, defeating Argentina, 26–24 in the final.

== Qualification ==
A total of eight men's teams have qualified to compete at the games. Host nation Canada, Argentina and the United States qualified automatically. The top team at the 2014, and top two at the 2015 South American Championships also qualified. The top two teams at the North American and Caribbean Championships in 2015 also qualified. Each nation may enter one team consisting of twelve athletes.

=== Summary ===
Event	Date	Location	Vacancies	Qualified
Host Nation	—	—	1	Canada
Qualified automatically	—	—	2	Argentina; United States
2014 South American Games	March 8–9	(Chile) Santiago	1	Uruguay
2014 NACRA Sevens	December 3–4	Mexico City	2	Guyana; Mexico
2015 Mar del Plata Sevens	January 10–11	(Argentina) Mar del Plata	2	Brazil; Chile
Total			8	

== Medalists ==
Event	Gold	Silver	Bronze
Men's tournament	Canada; Sean White; Admir Cejvanovic; Mike Fuailefau; John Moonlight; Conor Trainor; Sean Duke; Phil Mack; Justin Douglas; Nathan Hirayama; Lucas Hammond; Harry Jones; Matthew Mullins	Argentina; Fernando Luna; Santiago Alvarez; German Schulz; Nicolas Bruzzone; Emiliano Boffelli; Gastón Revol; Bautista Ezcurra; Rodrigo Etchart; Franco Sabato; Juan Tuculet; Ramiro Finco; Axel Muller Aranda	United States; Carlin Isles; Patrick Blair; Brett Thompson; Garrett Bender; Mike Te'o; Stephen Tomasin; Will Holder; Ben Leatigaga; Nate Augspurger; Madison Hughes; Perry Baker; Martin Iosefo

== Rosters ==
At the start of tournament, all eight participating countries had up to 12 players on their rosters.

- Argentina
- Brazil
- Canada
- Chile
- Guyana
- Mexico
- United States
- Uruguay

== Competition format ==
In the first round of the competition, teams were divided into two groups of four teams, and play followed a round robin format with each of the teams playing all other teams in the pool once. Teams were awarded three points for a win, two points for a draw and one point for a loss. All ties in the standings will be broken by point differential

Following the completion of the group games, all eight teams advanced to a single elimination round consisting of four quarterfinal games, two semifinal games, and the bronze and gold medal matches. Losing teams competed in classification matches to determine their ranking in the tournament. A penalty stroke competition took place, if a classification matched ended in a draw to determine a winner.

All games were played in two 7 minute halves, except the gold medal match which was played with 10-minute halves.

== Draw ==
The draw for the groups was determined using the 2014–15 Sevens World Series standings.

== Results ==
The official detailed schedule was revealed on June 9, 2015.

All times are Eastern Daylight Time (UTC−4)

=== Preliminary round ===
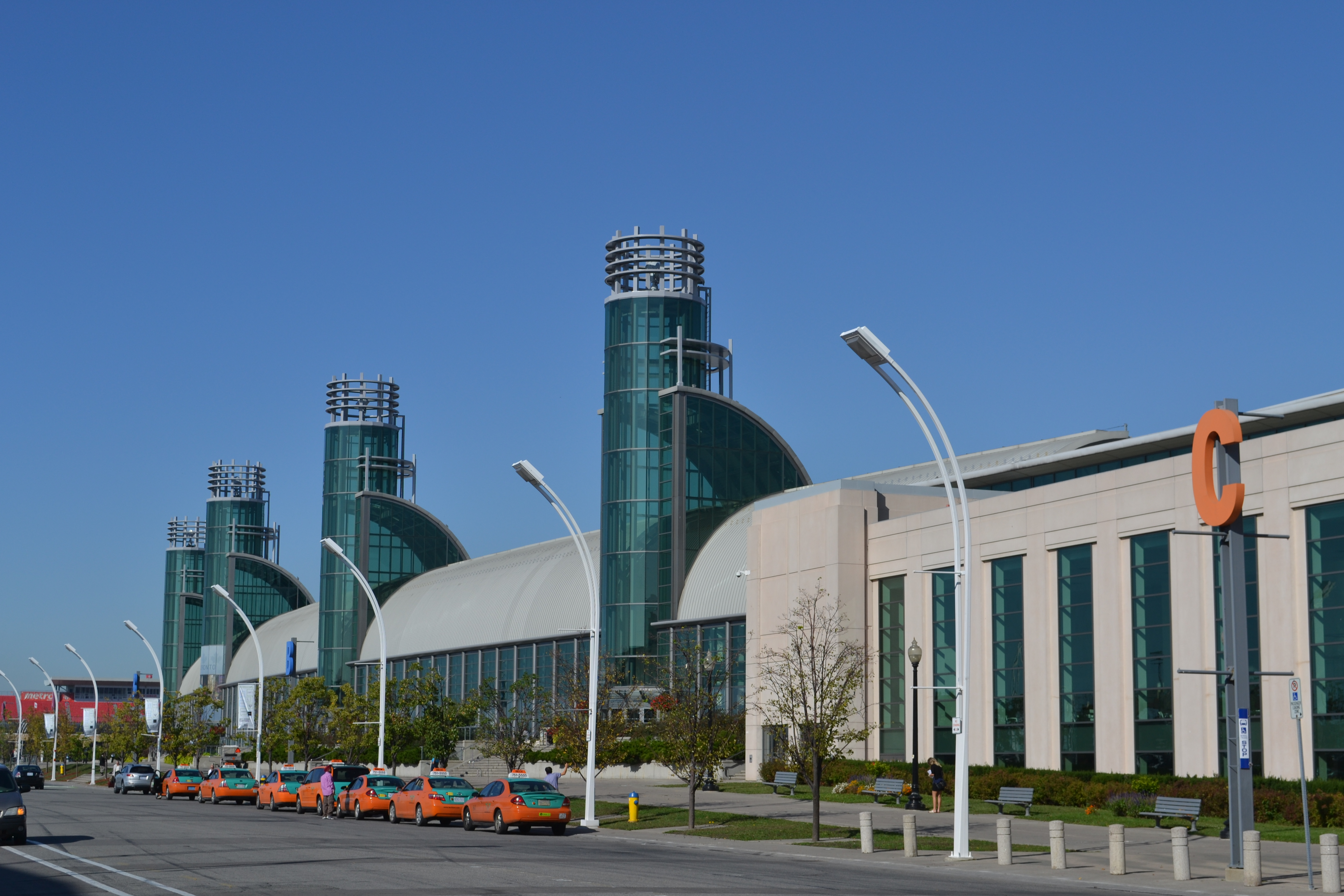
The Direct Energy Centre (Exhibition Centre), was the venue for the men's rugby sevens competition

==== Group A ====
Team	Pld	W	D	L	PF	PA	PD	Pts	Qualification
United States	3	3	0	0	126	7	+119	9	Qualified for the quarterfinals
Uruguay	3	2	0	1	54	69	−15	7	Qualified for the quarterfinals
Chile	3	1	0	2	62	46	+16	5	Qualified for the quarterfinals
Mexico	3	0	0	3	0	120	−120	3	Qualified for the quarterfinals

11 July 2015
11:11

United States	26–7	Chile
	Report

Exhibition Stadium, Toronto

11 July 2015
11:33

Uruguay	34–0	Mexico
	Report

Exhibition Stadium, Toronto

11 July 2015
16:05

United States	46–0	Mexico
	Report

Exhibition Stadium, Toronto

11 July 2015
16:27

Uruguay	20–17	Chile
	Report

Exhibition Stadium, Toronto

11 July 2015
18:49

Chile	38–0	Mexico
	Report

Exhibition Stadium, Toronto

11 July 2015
19:11

United States	52–0	Uruguay
	Report

Exhibition Stadium, Toronto

==== Group B ====
Team	Pld	W	D	L	PF	PA	PD	Pts	Qualification
Argentina	3	3	0	0	81	14	+67	9	Qualified for the quarterfinals
Canada	3	2	0	1	78	35	+43	7	Qualified for the quarterfinals
Brazil	3	1	0	2	52	50	+2	5	Qualified for the quarterfinals
Guyana	3	0	0	3	5	117	−112	3	Qualified for the quarterfinals

11 July 2015
11:55

Argentina	19–7	Brazil
	Report

Exhibition Stadium, Toronto

11 July 2015
12:17

Canada	45–0	Guyana
	Report

Exhibition Stadium, Toronto

11 July 2015
16:49

Argentina	41–0	Guyana
	Report

Exhibition Stadium, Toronto

11 July 2015
17:11

Canada	26–14	Brazil
	Report

Exhibition Stadium, Toronto

11 July 2015
19:33

Brazil	31–5	Guyana
	Report

Exhibition Stadium, Toronto

11 July 2015
19:55

Argentina	21–7	Canada
	Report

Exhibition Stadium, Toronto

==== Quarterfinals ====
12 July 2015
11:10

United States	31–0	Guyana
	Report

Exhibition Stadium, Toronto

12 July 2015
11:36

Canada	17–12	Chile
	Report

Exhibition Stadium, Toronto

12 July 2015
11:55

Uruguay	12–5	Brazil
	Report

Exhibition Stadium, Toronto

12 July 2015
12:17

Argentina	53–0	Mexico
	Report

Exhibition Stadium, Toronto

=== Classification round ===
Semifinals
July 12 — Toronto
Guyana	0
Chile	31
July 12 — Toronto
Brazil	14
Mexico	7

Fifth place
July 12 — Toronto
Chile	12
Brazil	7
Seventh place
July 12 — Toronto
Guyana	26
Mexico	22

==== Fifth through Eighth places ====
12 July 2015
16:05

Guyana	0–31	Chile
	Report

Exhibition Stadium, Toronto

12 July 2015
16:27

Brazil	14–7	Mexico
	Report

Exhibition Stadium, Toronto

==== Seventh place match ====
12 July 2015
18:50

Guyana	26–22	Mexico
	Report

Exhibition Stadium, Toronto

==== Fifth place match ====
12 July 2015
19:12

Chile	12–7	Brazil
	Report

Exhibition Stadium, Toronto

=== Medal round ===
Semifinals
July 12 — Toronto
United States	19
Canada	26
July 12 — Toronto
Argentina	43
Uruguay	7

Final
July 12 — Toronto
Argentina	19
Canada	22
Third place
July 12 — Toronto
United States	40
Uruguay	12

==== Semifinals ====
12 July 2015
16:49

United States	19–26	Canada
	Report

Exhibition Stadium, Toronto

12 July 2015
17:11

Uruguay	7–43	Argentina
	Report

Exhibition Stadium, Toronto

==== Bronze medal match ====
12 July 2015
19:34

(bronze) United States	40–12	Uruguay
	Report

Exhibition Stadium, Toronto

==== Gold medal match ====
12 July 2015
19:59

(gold) Canada	22–19	Argentina (silver)
	Report

Exhibition Stadium, Toronto

2015 Pan American Games champion

Canada
2nd title

== Final ranking ==
Rank	Team	Record
1st place, gold medalist(s)	Canada	5–1
2nd place, silver medalist(s)	Argentina	5–1
3rd place, bronze medalist(s)	United States	5–1
4	Uruguay	3–3
5	Chile	3–3
6	Brazil	2–4
7	Guyana	1–5
8	Mexico	0–6
