= Rowing at the 2015 Pan American Games – Women's quadruple sculls =

Rowing – Women's quadruple sculls at the 2015 Pan American Games
- Venue: Royal Canadian Henley Rowing Course
- Dates: July 12 - July 15
- Competitors: 24 from 6 nations
- Winning time: 7:07.63

Medalists
Gold medal	Kate Goodfellow; Kerry Maher-Shaffer; Carling Zeeman; Antje von Seydlitz	Canada
Silver medal	Sarah Giancola; Nicole Ritchie; Lindsay Meyer; Victoria Burke	United States
Bronze medal	Maria Laura Abalo; Karina Wilvers; Milka Kraljev; Maria Rohner	Argentina

The women's quadruple sculls rowing event at the 2015 Pan American Games was held from July 12–15 at the Royal Canadian Henley Rowing Course in St. Catharines.

== Schedule ==
All times are Eastern Standard Time (UTC-3).

Date	Time	Round
July 12, 2015	10:50	Heat
July 15, 2015	10:15	Final

== Results ==
=== Heat ===
Rank	Rowers	Country	Time	Notes
1	Kate Goodfellow; Kerry Maher-Shaffer; Carling Zeeman; Antje von Seydlitz	Canada	6:30.83	F
2	Sarah Giancola; Nicole Ritchie; Lindsay Meyer; Victoria Burke	United States	6:45.06	F
3	Aimee Hernandez; Yudeisy Rodriguez; Yarilexis Reyes; Yariulvis Cobas	Cuba	6:53.06	F
4	Caroline De Carvalho Corado; Sophia Valente Camara Py; Gabriela Cardozo de Almeida Salles; Yanka Vieira Rodrigues de Britto	Brazil	6:54.58	F
5	Soraya Jadue; Josefa Vila; Melita Abraham; Antonia Abraham	Chile	6:54.96	F
6	Maria Laura Abalo; Karina Wilvers; Milka Kraljev; Maria Rohner	Argentina	6:56.29	F

=== Final ===
Rank	Rowers	Country	Time	Notes
1st place, gold medalist(s)	Kate Goodfellow; Kerry Maher-Shaffer; Carling Zeeman; Antje von Seydlitz	Canada	7:07.63	
2nd place, silver medalist(s)	Sarah Giancola; Nicole Ritchie; Lindsay Meyer; Victoria Burke	United States	7:16.26	
3rd place, bronze medalist(s)	Maria Laura Abalo; Karina Wilvers; Milka Kraljev; Maria Rohner	Argentina	7:18.09	
4	Aimee Hernandez; Yudeisy Rodriguez; Yarilexis Reyes; Yariulvis Cobas	Cuba	7:27.56	
5	Soraya Jadue; Josefa Vila; Melita Abraham; Antonia Abraham	Chile	7:31.30	
6	Caroline De Carvalho Corado; Sophia Valente Camara Py; Gabriela Cardozo de Almeida Salles; Yanka Vieira Rodrigues de Britto	Brazil	7:32.88	
