= Kate Goodfellow =

Canadian rower

Personal information
- Born: 12 August 1989 (age 36) Kingston, Ontario, Canada

Sport
- Sport: Rowing
Medal record
Women's rowing
Representing Canada
World Championships
Silver medal – second place	2013 Chungju	W4x
Pan American Games
Gold medal – first place	2015 Toronto	Quadruple sculls

Kate Goodfellow (born August 12, 1989) is a Canadian rower from Lanark County, Ontario. She competed at several World cups, international events, along with the 2015 Pan American Games. Goodfellow is a former world championships silver medalist in the women's quadruple sculls event.
