= Kerry Maher-Shaffer =

Canadian rower (born 1984)

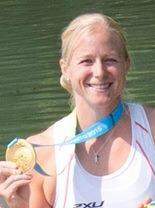
- Maher-Shaffer in 2015

Personal information
- Born: January 15, 1984 (age 42) Welland, Ontario, Canada
- Height: 179 cm (5 ft 10 in)
- Weight: 79 kg (174 lb)
Medal record
Women's Rowing
Representing Canada
Pan American Games
Gold medal – first place	2015 Toronto	Quadruple Sculls
Gold medal – first place	2015 Toronto	Double Sculls

Kerry Maher-Shaffer (born January 15, 1984) is a Canadian rower.

== Career ==
Maher-Shaffer won the singles sculls event at the Canadian Championships in 2010. Maher-Shaffer competed at three World Rowing Championships, finishing 13th in 2011 in the women's double sculls, fifth in the women's fours in 2014 and finally sixth in 2016 in the women's fours.

At the 2015 Pan American Games in Toronto, Canada (the rowing competitions were held in St. Catharines), Maher-Shaffer won two gold medals in the quadruple sculls and double sculls events.
