= Water skiing at the 2015 Pan American Games =

- Water skiing and wakeboarding pictogram for the games
- Venues: Ontario Place West Channel
- Dates: July 20–23, 2015
- No. of events: 9 (5 men, 4 women)
- Competitors: 39 from 12 nations

Water skiing competitions at the 2015 Pan American Games in Toronto was held from July 20 to 23, 2015 at the Ontario Place West Channel. The competition was split into two disciplines, water skiing and wakeboarding. Men and women will contest the water skiing events (four each in total) and the wakeboard board competition is only open to men. Therefore, there will be a total of nine medal events in the sport.

== Competition schedule ==
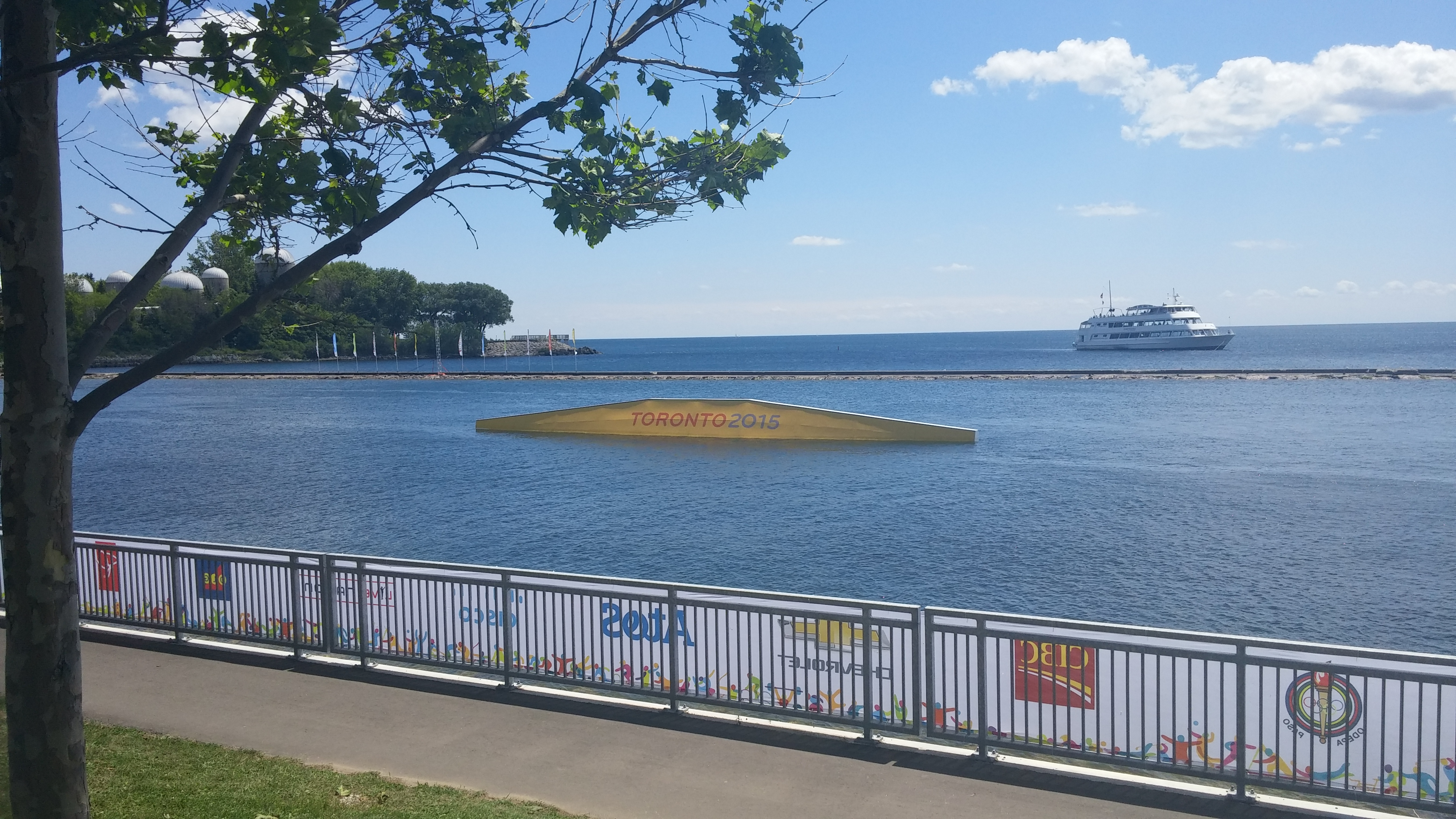
The Ontario Place West Channel, in Toronto, was the venue for the water skiing competitions

The following is the competition schedule for the water skiing competitions:

P	Preliminaries	½	Semifinals	F	Final

Event↓/Date →	Mon 20	Tue 21	Wed 22	Thu 23
Men's jump		P		F
Men's slalom		P		F
Men's tricks	P			F
Men's overall			F	
Men's wakeboard	½		F	
Women's jump		P		F
Women's slalom		P		F
Women's tricks	P			F
Women's overall			F	

== Medal table ==
* Host nation (Canada)

Rank	Nation	Gold	Silver	Bronze	Total
1	Canada*	4	5	0	9
2	United States	3	3	2	8
3	Chile	1	1	2	4
4	Peru	1	0	0	1
5	Argentina	0	0	3	3
6	Mexico	0	0	1	1
6	Venezuela	0	0	1	1
Totals (7 entries)		9	9	9	27

== Medalists ==
=== Men's events ===
Event	Gold	Silver	Bronze
Jump	Ryan Dodd; Canada	Rodrigo Miranda; Chile	Felipe Miranda; Chile
Slalom	Nate Smith; United States	Jason McClintock; Canada	Javier Julio; Argentina
Tricks	Adam Pickos; United States	Jaret Llewellyn; Canada	Javier Julio; Argentina
Overall	Felipe Miranda; Chile	Jaret Llewellyn; Canada	Javier Julio; Argentina
Wakeboard	Rusty Malinoski; Canada	Daniel Powers; United States	Juan Mendez; Venezuela

=== Women's events ===
Event	Gold	Silver	Bronze
Jump	Regina Jaquess; United States	Whitney McClintock; Canada	Fernanda Naser; Chile
Slalom	Whitney McClintock; Canada	Regina Jaquess; United States	Erika Lang; United States
Tricks	Natalia Cuglievan; Peru	Whitney McClintock; Canada	Erika Lang; United States
Overall	Whitney McClintock; Canada	Regina Jaquess; United States	Carolina Chapoy; Mexico

== Participating nations ==
A total of 12 countries have qualified athletes. The number of athletes a nation has entered is in parentheses beside the name of the country.

- Argentina (5)
- Brazil (2)
- Canada (5)
- Chile (4)
- Colombia (5)
- Dominican Republic (1)
- Ecuador (1)
- Guatemala (1)
- Mexico (5)
- Peru (4)
- United States (5)
- Venezuela (1)

== Qualification ==
A total of 40 athletes will qualify to compete at the games. The top 8 nations (including the host nation, Canada) at the 2014 Pan American Championship, will each receive four athlete quotas in water skiing. A further 8 spots are made available for wakeboard qualifiers. A nation may enter a maximum of three athletes in each gender in the water skiing competition.
