= Sailing at the 2015 Pan American Games =

- Sailing pictogram for the games
- Venues: Royal Canadian Yacht Club; Sugar Beach
- Dates: July 12–19
- No. of events: 10 (2 men, 3 women, 5 open)
- Competitors: 148 from 20 nations

Sailing competitions at the 2015 Pan American Games in Toronto will be held from July 12 to 19 at the Royal Canadian Yacht Club's ferry station and parking lot on the mainland side of the harbour. Spectator viewing areas were available for free on Sugar Beach and the surrounding boardwalk. A total of ten events were contested (two for men, three for women and five mixed gender events).

Originally nine medal events were scheduled to be contested at the games, but a tenth medal event (the women's 49erFX) was added to the program. This was done to get the event to have more gender equality.

The top placing athlete from North America and South America in the men's laser and women's laser radial, all qualified for the sailing competitions at the 2016 Summer Olympics in Rio de Janeiro, Brazil.

== Competition schedule ==
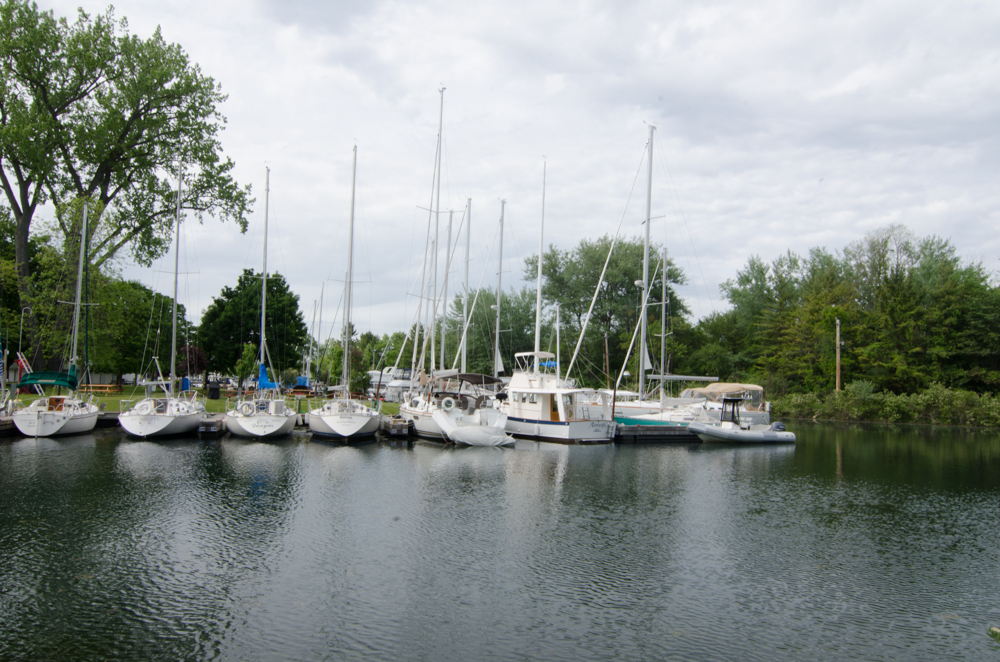
The Royal Canadian Yacht Club was the venue for the sailing competitions.

The following is the competition schedule for the sailing competitions:

P	Preliminary races	M	Medal race

Event↓/Date →	Sun 12	Mon 13	Tue 14	Wed 15	Thu 16	Fri 17	Sat 18	Sun 19
Men's RS:X	P	P	P	P	P	P	M	M
Men's Laser	P	P	P	P	P	P	M	M
Women's RS:X	P	P	P	P	P	P	M	M
Women's Laser Radial	P	P	P	P	P	P	M	M
Women's 49erFX	P	P	P	P	P	P	M	M
Open Sunfish	P	P	P	P	P	P	M	M
Open Snipe	P	P	P	P	P	P	M	M
Lightning	P	P	P	P	P	P	M	M
Hobie 16	P	P	P	P	P	P	M	M
Open J/24	P	P	P	P	P	P	M	M

== Competition format ==
All ten classes contested a series of opening races and conclude with a medal race which consisted of the top 50% of the boats (with a five boat minimum). All boats competed in a twelve series opening race, except the RS:X and 49erFX (which competed in a sixteen race opening series). The first six days saw all boats compete in two races each except the RS:X and 49erFX, which competed in three races on the first four days of racing. The last two days of competition saw five medal races each.

== Medal table ==
* Host nation (Canada)

Rank	Nation	Gold	Silver	Bronze	Total
1	Argentina	3	1	1	5
2	Brazil	2	2	2	6
3	Guatemala	2	0	0	2
4	United States	1	2	3	6
5	Puerto Rico	1	0	1	2
6	Ecuador	1	0	0	1
7	Canada*	0	2	1	3
8	Mexico	0	2	0	2
9	Uruguay	0	1	0	1
10	Chile	0	0	2	2
Totals (10 entries)		10	10	10	30

== Medalists ==
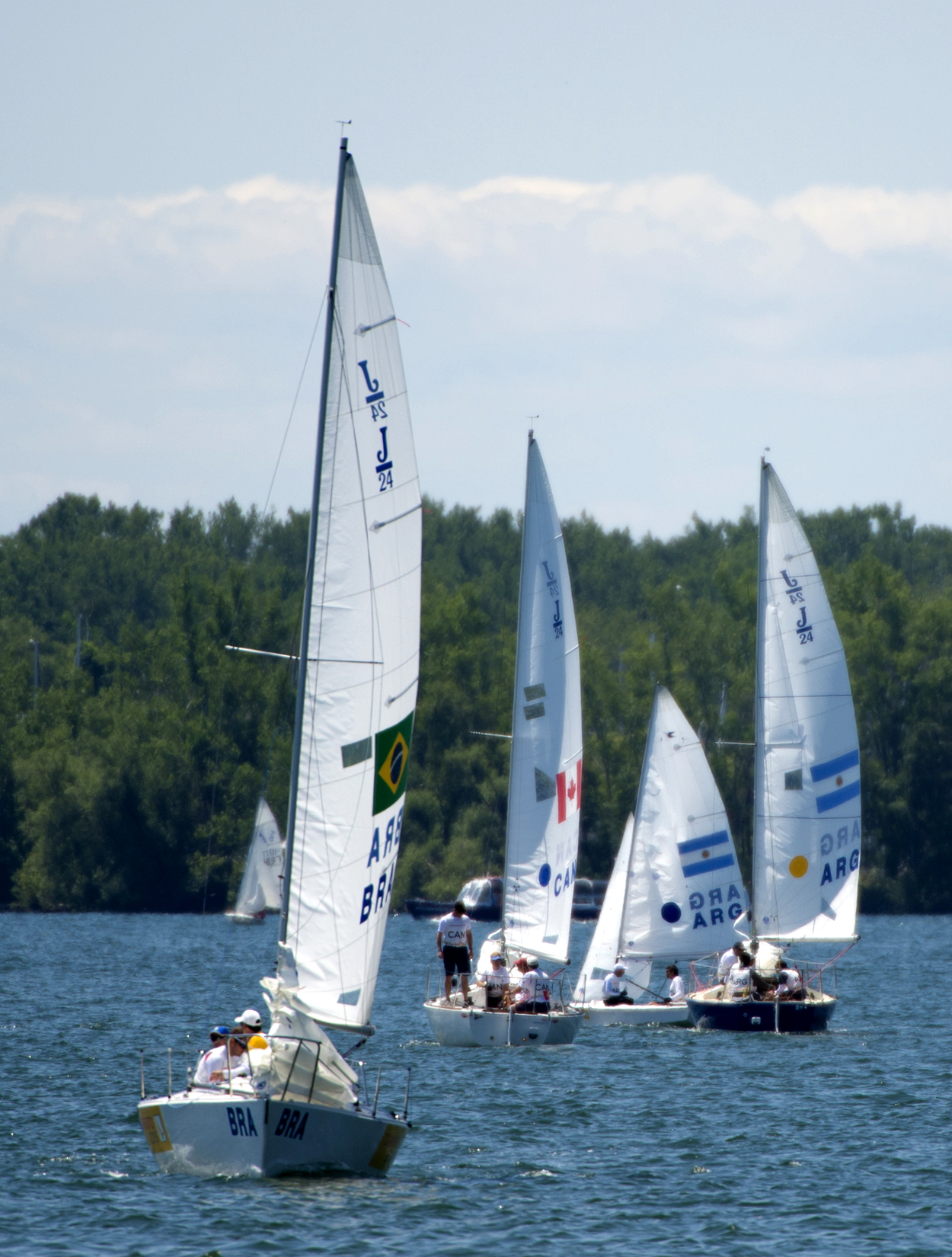
Sailing during the games

=== Men's events ===
Event	Gold	Silver	Bronze
RS:X	Ricardo Santos; Brazil	David Mier; Mexico	Mariano Reutemann; Argentina
Laser	Juan Ignacio Maegli; Guatemala	Robert Scheidt; Brazil	Lee Parkhill; Canada

=== Women's events ===
Event	Gold	Silver	Bronze
RS:X	Patrícia Freitas; Brazil	Demita Vega; Mexico	Marion Lepert; United States
Laser Radial	Paige Railey; United States	Dolores Moreira; Uruguay	Fernanda Decnop; Brazil
49erFX	Argentina; Maria Sol Branz; Victoria Travascio	Brazil; Martine Grael; Kahena Kunze	United States; Paris Henken; Helena Scutt

=== Open events ===
Event	Gold	Silver	Bronze
Sunfish	Jonathan Martinetti; Ecuador	Luke Ramsay; Canada	Andrés Ducasse; Chile
Snipe	Puerto Rico; Raúl Ríos; Fernando Monllor	Argentina; Diego Lipszyc; Luis Soubie	United States; Augie Diaz; Kathleen Tocke
Lightning	Argentina; Javier Conte; Nicolás Fracchia; María Salerno	United States; Justin Coplan; Caroline Patten; Danielle Prior	Brazil; María Altimira; Cláudio Biekarck; Gunnar Ficker
Hobie 16	Guatemala; Jason Hess; Irene Abascal	United States; Mark Modderman; Grace Modderman	Puerto Rico; Enrique Figueroa; Franchesca Valdes
J/24	Argentina; Matias Pereira; Guillermo Bellinotto; Federico Ambrus; Juan Pereyra	Canada; Terry McLaughlin; Sandy Andrews; David Ogden; David Jarvis	Chile; Matías Seguel; Cristobal Lira; Marc Jux; Sergio Baeza Roth

== Participating nations ==
A total of 21 countries have qualified athletes. The number of athletes a nation has entered is in parentheses beside the name of the country.

- Argentina (16)
- Aruba (1)
- Brazil (18)
- Canada (18)
- Chile (14)
- Colombia (7)
- Costa Rica (1)
- Cuba (3)
- Ecuador (7)
- El Salvador (1)
- Guatemala (5)
- Mexico (11)
- Peru (10)
- Puerto Rico (5)
- Saint Lucia (1)
- Trinidad and Tobago (2)
- United States (14)
- Uruguay (2)
- Venezuela (6)
- Virgin Islands (4)

== Qualification ==
A total of 140 sailors and 85 boats qualified to compete at the games. A nation may enter a maximum of one boat in each of the ten events and a maximum of eighteen athletes. Each event had different qualifying events that began in 2013. However, on December 22, 2014 the Pan American Sailing Federation announced the total quota was raised to 148 athletes and 93 boats (with the laser and laser standard events each receiving an additional four boats). This was done because the event became an Olympic qualifier.

== See also ==
- Sailing at the 2016 Summer Olympics
