= Table tennis at the 2015 Pan American Games – Qualification =

== Qualification system ==
A total of 80 table tennis athletes (40 men and 40 women) will qualify to compete at the games. A nation may enter a maximum of three athletes per gender. As host nation, Canada automatically qualifies a full team of six athletes. All other athletes will qualify at the qualification tournament in March 2015. Each region (Central America, Caribbean and South America) will qualify two teams each during the qualification event, along with the top three ranked teams as of the January ITTF Rankings. The final two spots will be awarded in a tournament organized immediately after the qualification event, open to all teams not yet qualified. The individual qualification will be held after both these tournaments.

A total of twelve teams per gender (3 athletes per team) will qualify along with four individual athletes per each gender.

== Qualification timeline ==
Event	Date	Venue
ITTF Rankings	January 3, 2015	—N/a
Qualification Tournament	March 17–22, 2015	(Argentina) Buenos Aires

== Qualification summary ==
NOC	Men		Women		Total
NOC	Individual	Team	Individual	Team	Total
Argentina	3	X	3	X	6
Brazil	3	X	3	X	6
Canada	3	X	3	X	6
Chile	3	X	3	X	6
Colombia			3	X	3
Cuba	3	X	3	X	6
Dominican Republic	3	X	3	X	6
Ecuador	3	X	1		4
Guatemala	3	X	3	X	6
Mexico	3	X	3	X	6
Paraguay	3	X			3
Peru	3		3	X	6
Puerto Rico	3	X	3	X	6
United States	3	X	3	X	6
Uruguay			1		1
Venezuela	1		2		3
Total: 16 NOCs	40	12	40	12	80

== Men ==
Competition/Ranking	Athletes per NOC	Total	Qualified
Host Nation	3	3	Canada
World Rankings as of January 2015	3	9	Brazil; Cuba; Argentina
Caribbean Qualification Tournament	3	6	Puerto Rico; Dominican Republic
Central American Qualification Tournament	3	6	Mexico; Guatemala
South American Qualification Tournament	3	6	Chile; Paraguay
Final Qualification Tournament	3	6	United States; Ecuador
Individuals	1	4	Luis Diaz (VEN); Bryan Blas (PER); Diego Rodriguez (PER); Johan Chavez (PER)
TOTAL		40	

== Women ==
Competition/Ranking	Athletes per NOC	Total	Qualified
Host Nation	3	3	Canada
World Rankings as of January 2015	3	9	United States; Brazil; Puerto Rico
Caribbean Qualification Tournament	3	6	Cuba; Dominican Republic
Central American Qualification Tournament	3	6	Mexico; Guatemala
South American Qualification Tournament	3	6	Colombia; Chile
Final Qualification Tournament	3	6	Argentina; Peru
Individuals	1	4	Gremlis Arvelo (VEN); Maria Lorenzotti (URU); Roxy Gonzalez (VEN); Eunice Galvez (ECU)
TOTAL		40	
