= Rowing at the 2015 Pan American Games – Qualification =

== Qualification system ==
A total of 205 rowers will qualify to compete at the games. A country may only enter a maximum of 26 rowers. All qualification was done at the 2014 Pan American Olympic Festival, where a specific number of boats qualified in each of the fourteen events (except the men's eights which will be by entry only). The host nation (Canada) and the United States were granted automatic qualification in all the events. Any remaining athlete quota spots after teams are selected, will be redistributed to fill the maximum quota.

== Qualification timeline ==
Event	Date	Venue
2014 Pan American Sports Festival	July 17–20, 2014	Mexico City

== Qualification summary ==
Nation	Men								Women						Crews	Athletes
Nation	M1x	M2x	M4x	M2-	M4-	M8+	LM2x	LM4-	W1x	W2x	W4x	W2-	LW1x	LW2x	Crews	Athletes
Argentina	X	X	X	X	X	X		X	X	X	X	X	X	X	13	26
Brazil	X	X		X	X	X	X	X	X	X	X		X	X	12	26
Canada	X	X	X	X	X	X	X	X	X	X	X	X	X	X	14	26
Chile	X	X		X	X	X	X	X	X	X	X	X			11	25
Cuba	X	X	X	X	X	X	X	X	X	X	X	X	X	X	14	26
El Salvador	X								X					X	3	4
Guatemala	X		X				X						X		4	8
Mexico	X	X	X	X	X		X	X					X	X	9	18
Nicaragua												X			1	2
Paraguay	X	X							X				X		4	5
Peru	X	X													2	3
United States	X	X	X	X	X	X	X	X	X	X	X	X	X	X	14	26
Uruguay	X	X					X								3	5
Venezuela		X					X		X				X	X	5	8
Total: 14 NOCs	12	11	6	7	7	6	9	7	9	6	6	6	9	8	108	209*

The maximum allowed is 209 athletes, but some athletes will double up which means a total of much less than 209.

== Men's events ==
=== Single sculls ===
Competition	Vacancies	Qualified
Host nation	1	Canada
Other NOC	1	United States
2014 Pan American Olympic Festival	10	Cuba; Mexico; Argentina; Chile; Guatemala; Brazil; Peru; Uruguay; Paraguay; El Salvador
Total	12	

=== Double sculls ===
Competition	Vacancies	Qualified
Host nation	1	Canada
Other NOC	1	United States
2014 Pan American Olympic Festival	9	Cuba; Mexico; Brazil; Chile; Argentina; Peru; Venezuela; Uruguay; Paraguay
Total	11	

=== Quadruple sculls ===
Competition	Vacancies	Qualified
Host nation	1	Canada
Other NOC	1	United States
2014 Pan American Olympic Festival	4	Cuba; Mexico; Argentina; Guatemala
Total	6	

=== Pairs ===
Competition	Vacancies	Qualified
Host nation	1	Canada
Other NOC	1	United States
2014 Pan American Olympic Festival	5	Mexico; Cuba; Argentina; Chile; Brazil
Total	7	

=== Fours ===
Competition	Vacancies	Qualified
Host nation	1	Canada
Other NOC	1	United States
2014 Pan American Olympic Festival	4	Cuba; Mexico; Argentina; Chile
Reallocation	1	Brazil
Total	7	

=== Eights ===
Competition	Vacancies	Qualified
Host nation	1	Canada
Other NOC	1	United States
Entry	4	Argentina; Brazil; Chile; Cuba
Total	6	

=== Lightweight double sculls ===
Competition	Vacancies	Qualified
Host nation	1	Canada
Other NOC	1	United States
2014 Pan American Olympic Festival	7	Mexico; Cuba; Chile; Venezuela; Uruguay; Brazil; Guatemala
Total	9	

=== Lightweight fours ===
Competition	Vacancies	Qualified
Host nation	1	Canada
Other NOC	1	United States
2014 Pan American Olympic Festival	5	Cuba; Mexico; Argentina; Chile; Brazil
Total	7	

== Women's events ==
=== Single sculls ===
Competition	Vacancies	Qualified
Host nation	1	Canada
Other NOC	1	United States
2014 Pan American Olympic Festival	~~8~~ 7	Argentina; Cuba; ~~Mexico~~; Brazil; Venezuela; Chile; Paraguay; El Salvador
Total	9	

=== Double sculls ===
Competition	Vacancies	Qualified
Host nation	1	Canada
Other NOC	1	United States
2014 Pan American Olympic Festival	~~4~~ 3	Cuba; Brazil; Argentina; ~~Mexico~~
Reallocation	1	Chile
Total	6	

=== Quadruple sculls ===
Competition	Vacancies	Qualified
Host nation	1	Canada
Other NOC	1	United States
2014 Pan American Olympic Festival	~~4~~ 3	Argentina; Cuba; ~~Mexico~~; Brazil
Reallocation	1	Chile
Total	6	

=== Pairs ===
Competition	Vacancies	Qualified
Host nation	1	Canada
Other NOC	1	United States
2014 Pan American Olympic Festival	~~3~~ 2	Argentina; Chile; ~~Mexico~~
Reallocation	2	Cuba; Nicaragua
Total	7	

=== Lightweight single sculls ===
Competition	Vacancies	Qualified
Host nation	1	Canada
Other NOC	1	United States
2014 Pan American Olympic Festival	7	Cuba; Mexico; Argentina; Brazil; Venezuela; Guatemala; Paraguay; ~~Peru~~
Total	9	

=== Lightweight double sculls ===
Competition	Vacancies	Qualified
Host nation	1	Canada
Other NOC	1	United States
2014 Pan American Olympic Festival	6	Brazil; Argentina; Cuba; Mexico; Venezuela; El Salvador
Total	8	
