= Water skiing at the 2015 Pan American Games – Qualification =

== Qualification system ==
Forty athletes qualified to compete at the games. The top eight nations (including the host nation, Canada) at the 2014 Pan American Championship, each received four athlete quotas in water skiing. A further eight spots were made available for wakeboard qualifiers. A nation could enter a maximum of three athletes in each gender in the water skiing competition.

== Qualification timeline ==
Event	Date	Venue
2014 Pan American Water Ski Championships	April 14–19	(Colombia) Bogotá
2015 Pan American Wakeboard Championships	February 12–15	(Argentina) Buenos Aires

== Qualification summary ==
NOC	Water skiing	Wakeboarding	Total athletes
Argentina	4	1	5
Brazil	1	1	2
Canada	4	1	5
Chile	4		4
Colombia	4	1	5
Dominican Republic	1		1
Ecuador		1	1
Guatemala	1		1
Mexico	4	1	5
Peru	4		4
United States	4	1	5
Venezuela		1	1
Total: 12 NOCs	31	8	40

== Water skiing ==
Eight nations took part at the Pan American Championships, and thus all eight qualify a full team.

Event	Qualified NOC's	Water skiers per NOC	Total
2014 Pan American Championship	Argentina; ~~Brazil~~; Canada; Chile; Colombia; Mexico; Peru; United States	4	28
2014 Pan American Championship	Brazil	1	1
Reallocation	Dominican Republic; Guatemala	1	2
TOTAL			31

- Brazil sent one water ski athlete, the remaining slots were reallocated.

== Wakeboarding ==
Event	Qualified Noc's	Wakeboarders per NOC	Total
Host nation	Canada	1	1
2014 Pan American Championship	Argentina; Brazil; Colombia; Ecuador; Mexico; United States; Venezuela	1	7
TOTAL			8
