= Mike Leigh (sailor) =

Canadian sailor

Personal information
- Full name: Michael Leigh
- Nickname: Clubber
- Nationality: Canada
- Born: 25 November 1984 (age 41) Nanaimo, British Columbia, Canada
- Height: 1.79 m (5 ft 10 1/2 in)
- Weight: 80 kg (176 lb)

Sailing career
- Sport: Sailing
- Club: Royal Vancouver Yacht Club
- Coached by: Joshua Chant
- Class: Dinghy

Michael Leigh (born 25 November 1984) is a Canadian sailor, who specialized in one-person (Laser) and two-person dinghy (470) classes. Representing Canada in two editions of the Olympic Games, he finished ninth in the Laser class at Beijing 2008, and then twenty-fifth in the 470 class at London 2012 with his partner Luke Ramsay. Leigh has also been training throughout his sailing career for the Royal Vancouver Yacht Club under his Australian-born personal coach Joshua Chant.

Leigh made his Olympic debut at the 2008 Summer Olympics in Beijing, where he sailed into the ninth position in the men's Laser class with a grade of 109, missing out of the medal podium by 34 net points and surpassing Norway's Kristian Ruth by a narrow, ten-point gap based on the total score.

At the 2012 Summer Olympics in London, Leigh teamed up with skipper Luke Ramsay to challenge the men's 470 class after having achieved a berth and finishing twenty-second from the World Championships in Barcelona, Spain. Sailing with Ramsay in the opening series, the Canadian duo posted a grade of 179 net points to earn a twenty-fifth-place finish in a fleet of twenty-seven boats.
