= Karate at the 2015 Pan American Games – Women's 50 kg =

Women's 50 kg at the 2015 Pan American Games
- Venue: Mississauga Sports Centre
- Dates: July 23
- Competitors: 8 from 8 nations

Medalists
Gold medal	Ana Villanueva	Dominican Republic
Silver medal	Gabriela Bruna	Chile
Bronze medal	Jusleen Virk	Canada
Bronze medal	Aline Souza	Brazil

The women's 50 kg competition of the karate events at the 2015 Pan American Games in Toronto, Ontario, Canada, was held on July 23 at the Mississauga Sports Centre.

== Schedule ==
All times are Central Standard Time (UTC-6).

Date	Time	Round
July 23, 2015	14:05	Pool matches
July 23, 2015	20:05	Semifinals
July 23, 2015	21:05	Final

== Results ==
The final results.

Legend

- KK — Forfeit (Kiken)

=== Pool 1 ===
Athlete	Nation	Pld	W	D	L	Points		
Athlete	Nation	Pld	W	D	L	GF	GA	Diff
Jusleen Virk	Canada	3	2	1	0	8	0	+8
Ana Villanueva	Dominican Republic	3	1	2	0	2	1	+1
Aurimer Campos	Venezuela	3	1	0	2	2	7	-5
Merly Huamaní	Peru	3	0	1	2	0	4	-4

	Score	
Merly Huamaní (PER)	0–0	Ana Villanueva (DOM)
Jusleen Virk (CAN)	5–0	Aurimer Campos (VEN)
Merly Huamaní (PER)	0–3	Jusleen Virk (CAN)
Ana Villanueva (DOM)	2–1	Aurimer Campos (VEN)
Merly Huamaní (PER)	0–1	Aurimer Campos (VEN)
Ana Villanueva (DOM)	0–0	Jusleen Virk (CAN)

=== Pool 2 ===
Athlete	Nation	Pld	W	D	L	Points		
Athlete	Nation	Pld	W	D	L	GF	GA	Diff
Aline Souza	Brazil	3	2	0	1	4	3	+1
Gabriela Bruna	Chile	3	2	0	1	3	2	+1
Cecilia Cuellar	Mexico	3	1	1	1	2	1	+1
Tyler Wolfe	United States	3	0	1	2	0	3	-3

	Score	
Aline Souza (BRA)	0–2	Cecilia Cuellar (MEX)
Gabriela Bruna (CHI)	1–0	Tyler Wolfe (USA)
Aline Souza (BRA)	2–1	Gabriela Bruna (CHI)
Cecilia Cuellar (MEX)	0–0	Tyler Wolfe (USA)
Aline Souza (BRA)	2–0	Tyler Wolfe (USA)
Cecilia Cuellar (MEX)	0–1	Gabriela Bruna (CHI)

=== Finals ===
Semifinals
Jusleen Virk (CAN)	1
Gabriela Bruna (CHI)	1
Ana Villanueva (DOM)	2
Aline Souza (BRA)	1

Gold medal match
Gabriela Bruna (CHI)	0
Ana Villanueva (DOM)	5
