= Karate at the 2015 Pan American Games – Women's 61 kg =

Women's 61 kg at the 2015 Pan American Games
- Venue: Mississauga Sports Centre
- Dates: July 24
- Competitors: 8 from 8 nations

Medalists
Gold medal	Alexandra Grande	Peru
Silver medal	Karina Diaz	Dominican Republic
Bronze medal	Daniela Lepin	Chile
Bronze medal	Merillela Arreola	Mexico

The women's 61 kg competition of the karate events at the 2015 Pan American Games in Toronto, Ontario, Canada, was held on July 24 at the Mississauga Sports Centre.

== Schedule ==
All times are Central Standard Time (UTC-6).

Date	Time	Round
July 24, 2015	15:10	Pool matches
July 24, 2015	20:25	Semifinals
July 24, 2015	21:15	Final

== Results ==
The final results.

Legend

- KK — Forfeit (Kiken)

=== Pool 1 ===
Athlete	Nation	Pld	W	D	L	Points		
Athlete	Nation	Pld	W	D	L	GF	GA	Diff
Alexandra Grande	Peru	3	2	1	0	17	8	+9
Karina Diaz	Dominican Republic	3	1	1	1	10	9	+1
Kamille Desjardins	Canada	3	1	0	2	7	7	0
Jacqueline Factos	Ecuador	3	1	0	2	5	15	-10

	Score	
Kamille Desjardins (CAN)	3–0	Jacqueline Factos (ECU)
Alexandra Grande (PER)	4–4	Karina Diaz (DOM)
Kamille Desjardins (CAN)	3–4	Alexandra Grande (PER)
Jacqueline Factos (ECU)	4–3	Karina Diaz (DOM)
Kamille Desjardins (CAN)	1–3	Karina Diaz (DOM)
Jacqueline Factos (ECU)	1–9	Alexandra Grande (PER)

=== Pool 2 ===
Athlete	Nation	Pld	W	D	L	Points		
Athlete	Nation	Pld	W	D	L	GF	GA	Diff
Merillela Arreola	Mexico	3	1	2	0	1	0	+1
Daniela Lepin	Chile	3	1	1	1	11	5	+6
Franyerlin Brito	Venezuela	3	1	1	1	1	8	-7
Joane Orbon	United States	3	1	0	2	5	5	0

	Score	
Franyerlin Brito (VEN)	0–8	Daniela Lepin (CHI)
Merillela Arreola (MEX)	1–0	Joane Orbon (USA)
Franyerlin Brito (VEN)	0–0	Merillela Arreola (MEX)
Daniela Lepin (CHI)	3–5	Joane Orbon (USA)
Franyerlin Brito (VEN)	1–0	Joane Orbon (USA)
Daniela Lepin (CHI)	0–0	Merillela Arreola (MEX)

=== Finals ===
Semifinals
Alexandra Grande (PER)	5
Daniela Lepin (CHI)	1
Karina Diaz (DOM)	2
Merillela Arreola (MEX)	1

Gold medal match
Alexandra Grande (PER)	4
Karina Diaz (DOM)	3
