= Javier Conte =

Argentine sailor (born 1975)

Medal record

Sailing

Representing Argentina

Olympic Games
Bronze medal – third place	2000 Sydney	Men's 470

Pan American Games
Gold medal – first place	2015 Toronto	Lightning
Gold medal – first place	2019 Lima	Lightning
Bronze medal – third place	2023 Santiago	Lightning

Javier Alberto Conte (born 7 September 1975 in Buenos Aires) is an Argentine sailboat racer.

Teaming up with Juan de la Fuente, he raced for Argentina on the 2000 Summer Olympics at Sydney, Australia finishing in third place and obtaining a bronze medal for his country. Considered for many as one of the best yachtman of his era, he continues to race around the world placing himself as a constant protagonist in all the races in which he participates. Javier won the gold medal at the 2015 Pan American Games.
