= Sailing at the 2015 Pan American Games – J/24 =

J/24 at the 2015 Pan American Games
- Venue: Royal Canadian Yacht Club
- Dates: July 12 - July 19
- Competitors: 24 from 6 nations

Medalists
Gold medal	Matias Pereira; Guillermo Bellinotto; Federico Ambrus; Juan Pereyra	Argentina
Silver medal	Terry McLaughlin; Sandy Andrews; David Ogden; David Jarvis	Canada
Bronze medal	Matías Seguel; Cristobal Lira; Marc Jux; Sergio Baeza Roth	Chile

The J/24 competition of the sailing events at the 2015 Pan American Games in Toronto was held from July 12 to July 19 at the Royal Canadian Yacht Club.

Points were assigned based on the finishing position in each race (1 for first, 2 for second, etc.). The points were totaled from the top 11 results of the first 12 races, with lower totals being better. If a team was disqualified or did not complete the race, 7 points were assigned for that race (as there were 6 teams in this competition). The top 5 teams at that point competed in the final race, with placings counting double for final score. The team with the lowest total score won.

== Schedule ==
All times are Eastern Daylight Time (UTC-4).

Date	Time	Round
July 12, 2015	11:35	Race 1
July 13, 2015	11:35	Races 2 and 3
July 14, 2015	11:35	Races 4 and 5
July 15, 2015	11:35	Races 6 and 7
July 16, 2015	11:35	Races 8, 9 and 10
July 17, 2015	11:35	Races 11 and 12
July 19, 2015	15:15	Medal race

== Results ==
Race M is the medal race.

Rank	Athlete	Nation	Race													Total Points	Net Points
Rank	Athlete	Nation	1	2	3	4	5	6	7	8	9	10	11	12	M	Total Points	Net Points
1st place, gold medalist(s)	Matias Pereira; Guillermo Bellinotto; Federico Ambrus; Juan Pereyra	Argentina	1	3	(7); OCS	1	1	2	1	1	4	1	3	3	6	34	37
2nd place, silver medalist(s)	Terry McLaughlin; Sandy Andrews; David Ogden; David Jarvis	Canada	2	1	1	3	2	4	5	2	5	4	2	(6)	8	45	39
3rd place, bronze medalist(s)	Matías Seguel; Cristobal Lira; Marc Jux; Sergio Baeza Roth	Chile	5	4	3	4	5	(6)	4	3	1	2	1	2	10	50	44
4	Luis Olcese; Christian Sas; Joel Raffo; Jorge Castro	Peru	3	5	(7); OCS	5	3	1	3	7 OCS	3	6	4	1	4	52	45
5	John Spear King; Alexandre Saldanha; Daniel Santiago; Guilherme Hamelmann	Brazil	4	2	4	6	4	5	2	(7); OCS	2	5	6	5	2	54	47
6	Kenneth Porter; Gerrit Gentry; Daniel Baños; Pamela Noriega	Mexico	(6)	6	2	2	6	3	6	4	6	3	5	4		53	47

== See also ==
- List of J/24 championships
