= Sailing at the 2015 Pan American Games – Sunfish =

Sunfish at the 2015 Pan American Games
- Venue: Royal Canadian Yacht Club
- Dates: July 12 - July 19
- Competitors: 12 from 12 nations

Medalists
Gold medal	Jonathan Martinetti	Ecuador
Silver medal	Luke Ramsay	Canada
Bronze medal	Andres Ducasse	Chile

The Sunfish competition of the sailing events at the 2015 Pan American Games in Toronto was held from July 12 to July 19 at the Royal Canadian Yacht Club. The last champion was Matheus Dellangnello of Brazil.

Points were assigned based on the finishing position in each race (1 for first, 2 for second, etc.). The points were totaled from the top 11 results of the first 12 races, with lower totals being better. If a sailor was disqualified or did not complete the race, 13 points were assigned for that race (as there were 12 sailors in this competition). The top 6 sailors at that point competed in the final race, with placings counting double for final score. The sailor with the lowest total score won.

== Schedule ==
All times are Eastern Daylight Time (UTC-4).

Date	Time	Round
July 12, 2015	11:35	Race 1
July 13, 2015	11:35	Races 2 and 3
July 14, 2015	11:35	Race 4
July 15, 2015	10:35	Races 5, 6 and 7
July 16, 2015	11:35	Races 8, 9 and 10
July 17, 2015	11:35	Races 11 and 12
July 19, 2015	12:35	Medal race

== Results ==
Race M is the medal race. Each boat can drop its lowest result provided that all twelve races are completed. If less than ten races are completed all races will count. Boats cannot drop their result in the medal race.

Rank	Athlete	Nation	Race													Total Points	Net Points
Rank	Athlete	Nation	1	2	3	4	5	6	7	8	9	10	11	12	M	Total Points	Net Points
1st place, gold medalist(s)	Jonathan Martinetti	Ecuador	2	(7)	4	3	2	5	1	2	2	4	5	7	8	52	45
2nd place, silver medalist(s)	Luke Ramsay	Canada	1	1	3	4	7	3	8	3	1	1	(13); OCS	3	10	58	45
3rd place, bronze medalist(s)	Andres Ducasse	Chile	6	3	1	1	1	7	7	7	3	(8)	1	8	4	57	49
4	João Augusto Hackerott	Brazil	5	(6)	5	2	3	4	4	6	6	6	2	2	6	56	50
5	Jean Paul de Trazegnies Valdez	Peru	4	5	8	5	5	(10)	10	1	5	2	6	4	2	67	57
6	Conner Blouin	United States	8	2	2	6	8	8	(13); OCS	5	4	7	4	1	14; OCS	82	69
7	Francisco Renna	Argentina	3	4	6	8	4	1	(9)	4	8	5	8	9		69	60
8	Peter Stanton	Virgin Islands	9	9	7	7	(10)	2	5	8	7	3	3	10		80	70
9	Ramón González	Puerto Rico	(12)	11	11	11	6	6	4	12	9	9	7	6		104	92
10	Jacobo Margules	Mexico	7	8	9	12	12	12	2	9	12	(13); UFD	10	5		111	98
11	David González	Venezuela	(11)	10	10	10	9	9	6	11	10	11	9	11		117	106
12	Gabriel Sanz	Guatemala	10	(12)	12	9	11	11	11	10	11	10	11	12		130	118
