= Water skiing at the 2015 Pan American Games – Men's slalom =

Men's slalom at the 2015 Pan American Games
- Venue: Ontario Place West Channel
- Dates: July 20 – July 23
- Competitors: 18 from 10 nations

Medalists
Gold medal	Nate Smith	United States
Silver medal	Jason McClintock	Canada
Bronze medal	Javier Julio	Argentina

The men's slalom competition of the Water skiing events at the 2015 Pan American Games in Toronto were held from July 20 to July 23 at the Ontario Place West Channel. The defending champion was Jonathan Travers of United States.

== Results ==
=== Preliminary round ===
Rank	Name	Country	Result	Notes
1	Nate Smith	United States	2.00/58/10.25	Q
2	Javier Julio	Argentina	4.50/58/11.25	Q
2	Sandro Ambrosi	Mexico	4.50/58/11.25	Q
4	Santiago Correa	Colombia	3.50/58/11.25	Q
4	Jason McClintock	Canada	3.50/58/11.25	Q
6	Felipe Miranda	Chile	3.00/58/11.25	Q
6	Robert Pigozzi	Dominican Republic	3.00/58/11.25	Q
6	Adam Pickos	United States	3.00/58/11.25	
6	Jose Mesa	Colombia	3.00/58/11.25	Q
10	Carlos Lamadrid	Mexico	2.50/58/11.25	
11	Felipe Neves	Brazil	2.00/58/11.25	
12	Rodrigo Miranda	Chile	4.00/58/12.00	
12	Martin Malarczuk	Argentina	4.00/58/12.00	
14	Mateo Botero	Colombia	3.00/58/12.00	
15	Mario Mustafa	Peru	2.50/58/13.00	
16	Jaret Llewellyn	Canada	2.50/58/13.00	
17	Alvaro Lamadrid	Mexico	0.50/58/14.00	
18	Andrew Dunlap	Guatemala		

=== Final ===
Rank	Name	Country	Result	Notes
1st place, gold medalist(s)	Nate Smith	United States	1.00/58/10.25	
2nd place, silver medalist(s)	Jason McClintock	Canada	1.00/58/10.25	
3rd place, bronze medalist(s)	Javier Julio	Argentina	5.00/58/11.25	
4	Santiago Correa	Colombia	5.00/58/11.25	
5	Felipe Miranda	Chile	5.00/58/11.25	
6	Sandro Ambrosi	Mexico	2.50/58/11.25	
7	Jose Mesa	Colombia	2.50/58/11.25	
8	Robert Pigozzi	Dominican Republic	3.00/58/14.25	
