= Water skiing at the 2015 Pan American Games – Women's slalom =

Women's slalom at the 2015 Pan American Games
- Venue: Ontario Place West Channel
- Dates: July 20 – July 23
- Competitors: 10 from 7 nations

Medalists
Gold medal	Whitney McClintock	Canada
Silver medal	Regina Jaquess	United States
Bronze medal	Erika Lang	United States

The women's slalom competition of the Water skiing events at the 2015 Pan American Games in Toronto were held from July 20 to July 23 at the Ontario Place West Channel. The defending champion was Regina Jaquess of the United States.

== Results ==
=== Preliminary round ===
Rank	Name	Country	Result	Notes
1	Whitney McClintock	Canada	3.00/55/10.75	Q
2	Regina Jaquess	United States	1.00/55/10.75	Q
3	Delfina Cuglievan	Peru	2.00/55/11.25	Q
4	Erika Lang	United States	3.00/55/12.00	Q
5	Alexandra De Osma	Peru	2.00/55/12.00	Q
5	Valentina Gonzalez	Chile	2.00/55/12.00	Q
7	Carolina Chapoy	Mexico	1.00/55/12.00	
8	Fernanda Naser	Chile	4.00/55/13.00	
9	Paula Jaramillo	Colombia	3.00/55/13.00	
10	Lorena Botana	Argentina	0.00/55/18.25	

=== Final ===
Rank	Name	Country	Result	Notes
1st place, gold medalist(s)	Whitney McClintock	Canada	3.50/55/11.25	
2nd place, silver medalist(s)	Regina Jaquess	United States	3.00/55/11.25	
3rd place, bronze medalist(s)	Erika Lang	United States	2.00/55/12.00	
4	Delfina Cuglievan	Peru	1.50/55/12.00	
5	Alexandra De Osma	Peru	2.00/55/13.00	
6	Valentina Gonzalez	Chile	1.50/55/13.00	
