= Water skiing at the 2015 Pan American Games – Women's jump =

Women's jump at the 2015 Pan American Games
- Venue: Ontario Place West Channel
- Dates: July 21 – July 23
- Competitors: 9 from 7 nations

Medalists
Gold medal	Regina Jaquess	United States
Silver medal	Whitney McClintock	Canada
Bronze medal	Fernanda Naser	Chile

The women's jump competition of the Water skiing events at the 2015 Pan American Games in Toronto were held from July 21 to July 23 at the Ontario Place West Channel. The defending champion was Regina Jaquess of the United States.

== Results ==
=== Preliminary round ===
Rank	Name	Country	Result	Notes
1	Regina Jaquess	United States	49.9	Q
2	Whitney McClintock	Canada	47.8	Q
3	Carolina Chapoy	Mexico	38.6	Q
4	Fernanda Naser	Chile	37.6	Q
5	Valentina Gonzalez	Chile	36.4	Q
6	Alexandra De Osma	Peru	33.6	Q
7	Paula Jaramillo	Colombia	32.6	
8	Erika Lang	United States	32.0	
9	Lorena Botana	Argentina	0.0	

=== Final ===
Rank	Name	Country	Result	Notes
1st place, gold medalist(s)	Regina Jaquess	United States	49.1	
2nd place, silver medalist(s)	Whitney McClintock	Canada	47.7	
3rd place, bronze medalist(s)	Fernanda Naser	Chile	39.2	
4	Carolina Chapoy	Mexico	38.8	
5	Valentina Gonzalez	Chile	37.8	
6	Alexandra De Osma	Peru	32.9	
