= Luke Ramsay =

Canadian sailor

Personal information
- Nationality: Canada
- Born: 30 January 1988 (age 38) Vancouver, British Columbia, Canada
- Height: 1.73 m (5 ft 8 in)
- Weight: 68 kg (150 lb)

Sailing career
- Sport: Sailing
- Club: Royal Vancouver Yacht Club
- Coached by: Ian Andrews
- Classes: Dinghy, multihull
Medal record
Sailing
Representing Canada
Pan American Games
Silver medal – second place	2019 Lima	Open Sunfish
Silver medal – second place	2015 Toronto	Open Sunfish

Luke Ramsay (born 31 January 1988) is a Canadian sailor, who specialized in two-person dinghy (470) and mixed multihull (Nacra 17) classes. He represented Canada, along with his partner and Olympic veteran Mike Leigh, at the 2012 Summer Olympics, and has also been training throughout his sailing career for the Royal Vancouver Yacht Club under his personal coach Ian Andrews. As of June 2015, Ramsay is ranked among the top 100 sailors in the world for the two-person dinghy class, and sixteenth for the mixed multihull class.

Ramsay qualified as a crew member for the Canadian squad in the men's 470 class at the 2012 Summer Olympics in London by having achieved a berth and finishing twenty-second from the World Championships in Barcelona, Spain. Sailing with skipper Leigh in the opening series, the Canadian duo posted a grade of 179 net points to earn a twenty-fifth-place finish in a fleet of twenty-seven boats.

Since his Olympic debut at London 2012, Ramsay has teamed up with windsurfer and three-time Olympian Nikola Girke in the mixed multihull class Nacra 17. They competed together for the 2016 Summer Olympics in Rio de Janeiro, scoring 15th (of 20 competitors).
