= Sailing at the 2015 Pan American Games – Lightning =

Lightning at the 2015 Pan American Games
- Venue: Royal Canadian Yacht Club
- Dates: July 12 - July 19
- Competitors: 21 from 7 nations

Medalists
Gold medal	Nicolás Fracchia; Javier Conte; María Salerno	Argentina
Silver medal	Justin Coplan; Caroline Patten; Danielle Prior	United States
Bronze medal	Cláudio Biekarck; Gunnar Ficker; María Altimira	Brazil

The Lightning competition of the sailing events at the 2015 Pan American Games in Toronto was held from July 12 to July 19 at the Royal Canadian Yacht Club.

Points were assigned based on the finishing position in each race (1 for first, 2 for second, etc.). The points were totaled from the top 11 results of the first 12 races, with lower totals being better. If a team was disqualified or did not complete the race, 8 points were assigned for that race (as there were 7 teams in this competition). The top 5 teams at that point competed in the final race, with placings counting double for final score. The team with the lowest total score won.

== Schedule ==
All times are Eastern Daylight Time (UTC-4).

Date	Time	Round
July 12, 2015	11:35	Race 1
July 13, 2015	11:35	Races 2 and 3
July 14, 2015	11:35	Races 4 and 5
July 15, 2015	11:35	Races 6 and 7
July 16, 2015	11:35	Races 8, 9 and 10
July 17, 2015	11:35	Races 11 and 12
July 19, 2015	11:35	Medal race

== Results ==
Race M is the medal race.

Rank	Athlete	Nation	Race													Total Points	Net Points
Rank	Athlete	Nation	1	2	3	4	5	6	7	8	9	10	11	12	M	Total Points	Net Points
1st place, gold medalist(s)	Nicolás Fracchia; María Salerno; Javier Conte	Argentina	3	2	1	1	2	2	3	3	1	(5)	1	2	4	30	25
2nd place, silver medalist(s)	Justin Coplan; Caroline Patten; Danielle Prior	United States	1	1	6	(7)	4	3	1	2	2	2	3	6	6	44	37
3rd place, bronze medalist(s)	Cláudio Biekarck; Gunnar Ficker; María Altimira	Brazil	2	3	2	2	3	5	(6)	1	4	3	4	5	10	49	43
4	Tito González; Trinidad González; Cristian Herman	Chile	(5)	4	4	4	1	1	2	5	5	1	5	4	8	49	44
5	Jamie Allan; Chantal Leger; Jay Deakin	Canada	4	5	5	5	5	5	(8); OCS	4	3	7	6	3	2	62	54
6	Julio Vélez; Juan Santos Dillon; Maria Rodriguez	Ecuador	(7)	6	7	6	7	6	4	6	7	4	2	1		63	56
7	Raymond Jacob; Loreana Jacob; Julian Ramirez	Colombia	6	7	3	3	6	7	5	(8); RET	6	6	7	7		71	63
