= Peru at the 2015 Pan American Games =

- IOC code: PER
- NOC: Peruvian Olympic Committee
- Website: www.coperu.org

in Toronto, Canada 10–26 July 2015
- Competitors: 157 in 26 sports
- Flag bearer (opening): Diego Elías
- Flag bearer (closing): Alexandra Grande
- Medals Ranked 14th: Gold 3 Silver 3 Bronze 6 Total 12

Pan American Games appearances (overview)
- 1951; 1955; 1959; 1963; 1967; 1971; 1975; 1979; 1983; 1987; 1991; 1995; 1999; 2003; 2007; 2011; 2015; 2019; 2023

Peru competed in the 2015 Pan American Games in Toronto, Canada from July 10 to 26, 2015.

On July 2, 2015, squash player Diego Elías was named the flagbearer of the team during the opening ceremony.

It was the second best participation of Peru in Pan American Games adding 12 medals to his historic count winning 3 gold, 3 silver and 6 bronze medals. The best participation of Peru was in Buenos Aires 1951.

Water skiing athlete Natalia Cuglievan, Karate Alexandra Grande and veteran shooter Francisco Boza won gold medals. .

== Competitors ==
The following table lists Peru's delegation per sport and gender.

Sport	Men	Women	Total
Athletics	6	7	13
Badminton	4	4	8
Boxing	1	2	3
Canoeing	0	1	1
Cycling	4	0	4
Diving	2	0	2
Equestrian	1	0	1
Fencing	0	1	1
Football	18	0	18
Golf	2	2	4
Gymnastics	2	2	4
Judo	4	0	4
Karate	0	3	3
Modern pentathlon	2	1	3
Rowing	3	0	3
Sailing	8	2	10
Shooting	9	4	13
Squash	3	0	3
Swimming	5	5	10
Synchronized swimming	—N/a	9	9
Table tennis	3	3	6
Taekwondo	1	2	3
Tennis	0	1	1
Triathlon	0	3	3
Volleyball	0	12	12
Water skiing	1	3	4
Weightlifting	2	2	4
Wrestling	4	3	7
Total	85	72	157

== Badminton ==
Peru qualified a full team of eight athletes (four men and four women).

Men

Athlete	Event	First round	Round of 32	Round of 16	Quarterfinals	Semifinals	Final	Rank
Athlete	Event	Opposition Result	Opposition Result	Opposition Result	Opposition Result	Opposition Result	Opposition Result	Rank
Andrés Corpancho	Singles	Castillo (MEX); L (18–21, 18–21)	did not advance					
Mario Cuba	Singles	Bye	Tjong (BRA); W (21–14, 21–13)	D'Souza (CAN); L (8–21, 9–21)	did not advance			
José Guevara	Singles	Bye	Garrido (MEX); L (12–21, 10–21)	did not advance				
Mario Cuba; Martín del Valle	Doubles	—N/a		Tjong / Coelho (BRA); W (22–10, 21–17)	Castillo / Muñoz (MEX); L (17–21, 14–21)	did not advance		
Andrés Corpancho; José Guevara	Doubles	—N/a		Arthuso / Paiola (BRA); L (13–21, 17–21)	did not advance			

Women

Athlete	Event	First round	Round of 32	Round of 16	Quarterfinals	Semifinals	Final	Rank
Athlete	Event	Opposition Result	Opposition Result	Opposition Result	Opposition Result	Opposition Result	Opposition Result	Rank
Daniela Macías	Singles	Bye	Saturria (DOM); W (21–6, 21–7)	Quan (GUA); W (21–3, 21–2)	Wang (USA); L (9–21, 6–21)	did not advance		
Dánica Nishimura	Singles	Artiz (CUB); W (21–17, 21–16)	Zornoza (PER); L (14–21, 23–21, 18–21)	did not advance				
Luz María Zornoza	Singles	Bye	Nishimura (PER); W (21–14, 21–23, 21–18)	Gaitan (MEX); L (21–18, 12–21, 17–21)	did not advance			
Daniela Macías; Dánica Nishimura	Doubles	—N/a		Williams / Wynter (JAM); W (21–13, 21–7)	Lee / Obañana (USA); L (6–21, 10–21)	did not advance		
Katherine Winder; Luz María Zornoza	Doubles	—N/a		Perez / Oropeza (CUB); W (21–8, 21–7)	Bruce / Chan (CAN); L (6–21, 10–21)	did not advance		

Women

Athlete	Event	Round of 32	Round of 16	Quarterfinals	Semifinals	Final	Rank
Athlete	Event	Opposition Result	Opposition Result	Opposition Result	Opposition Result	Opposition Result	Rank
Andrés Corpancho; Luz María Zornoza	Doubles	Ocegueda / Solis (MEX); W (21–15, 21–13)	Ng / Bruce (CAN); L (19–21, 16–21)	did not advance			
Mario Cuba; Katherine Winder	Doubles	Bye	Reid / Williams (JAM); W (21–19, 21–11)	Martínez / Oropeza (CUB); W (21–12, 21–11)	Chew / Subandhi (USA); L (18–21, 14–21)	Did not advance	3rd place, bronze medalist(s)

== Boxing ==
Peru qualified three boxers (one man and two women).

Athlete	Event	Preliminaries	Quarterfinals	Semifinals	Final	Rank
Athlete	Event	Opposition Result	Opposition Result	Opposition Result	Opposition Result	Rank
Jorvi Ferronan	Men's bantamweight	Azocar (VEN); W 2–1	Martinez (USA); L TKO	did not advance		
Lucy Valdivia	Women's flyweight	—N/a	Bujold (CAN); L 0–3	did not advance		
Stefani Lopez	Women's light welterweight	—N/a	Sánchez (ARG); L 0–3	did not advance		

== Canoeing ==
=== Sprint ===
Peru received one wildcard in women's canoeing.

Women

Athlete	Event	Final	
Athlete	Event	Time	Rank
Keren Guerra	C-1 200 m	1:05.445	8

== Diving ==
Peru qualified two male divers.

Men

Athlete	Event	Preliminary		Final	
Athlete	Event	Points	Rank	Points	Rank
Adrian Infante	3 m springboard	266.65	19	did not advance	
Daniel Pinto	3 m springboard	267.90	18	did not advance	
Adrian Infante; Daniel Pinto	3 m synchronized springboard	—N/a		283.47	8

== Equestrian ==
Peru qualified a full team in the jumping event, however the country only entered one athlete into the individual competition.

Individual

Athlete	Horse	Event	Round 1		Round 2		Round 3		Final					
Athlete	Horse	Event	Round 1		Round 2		Round 3		Round A		Round B		Total	
Athlete	Horse	Event	Penalties	Rank	Penalties	Rank	Penalties	Rank	Penalties	Rank	Penalties	Rank	Penalties	Rank
Alonso Valdéz	Ferrero van Overis	Individual	0	=1	9	=32	9	=34	8	=12	4	=8	12	=11

== Fencing ==
Peru qualified 1 fencer (1 woman).

Athlete	Event	Pool Round		Round of 16	Quarterfinals	Semifinals	Final	
Athlete	Event	Victories	Seed	Opposition Score	Opposition Score	Opposition Score	Opposition Score	Rank
María Luisa Doig	Women's Épée	2	13	Katarzyna Trzopek (USA); L 2–15	did not advance			

== Football ==
=== Men's tournament ===
Peru qualified a men's team of 18 athletes.

Roster

The following was Peru's roster for the 2015 Pan American Games.

Head coach: Víctor Rivera

No.	Pos.	Player	Date of birth (age)	Club
1	GK	Jonathan Medina	April 29, 1993 (aged 22)	(Peruvian Football Federation) Melgar
2	DF	Yordi Vílchez	February 13, 1995 (aged 20)	(Peruvian Football Federation) Juan Aurich
3	DF	Brian Bernaola	January 17, 1995 (aged 20)	(Peruvian Football Federation) Sporting Cristal
4	DF	Saúl Salas	October 10, 1994 (aged 20)	(Peruvian Football Federation) Municipal
5	DF	Elsar Rodas	February 28, 1994 (aged 21)	(Peruvian Football Federation) Sporting Cristal
6	MF	Rafael Guarderas	September 12, 1993 (aged 21)	(Peruvian Football Federation) Universitario
7	FW	Ray Sandoval	May 29, 1995 (aged 20)	(Peruvian Football Federation) Real Garcilaso
8	MF	Renzo Garcés	June 12, 1996 (aged 19)	(Peruvian Football Federation) USMP
9	FW	Gonzalo Maldonado	May 18, 1994 (aged 21)	(Peruvian Football Federation) Universitario
10	MF	Victor Cedron	October 6, 1993 (aged 21)	(Peruvian Football Federation) Cesar Vallejo
11	FW	Kevin Ruiz	February 14, 1995 (aged 20)	(Peruvian Football Federation) Universitario
12	GK	Daniel Prieto	July 1, 1995 (aged 20)	(Peruvian Football Federation) Alianza Lima
13	DF	Joaquín Aguirre	July 24, 1995 (aged 19)	(Peruvian Football Federation) Universitario
14	MF	Pedro Aquino	April 13, 1995 (aged 20)	(Peruvian Football Federation) Sporting Cristal
15	MF	José Manzaneda	September 10, 1994 (aged 20)	(Peruvian Football Federation) Juan Aurich
16	DF	Juan Diego Li	February 16, 1995 (aged 20)	(Peruvian Football Federation) Alianza Lima
17	MF	Juan Morales	March 6, 1989 (aged 26)	(Peruvian Football Federation) Cesar Vallejo
18	MF	Alexis Arias	December 13, 1995 (aged 19)	(Peruvian Football Federation) Melgar

Group A

Pos	Team	Pld	W	D	L	GF	GA	GD	Pts	Qualification
1	Brazil	3	2	1	0	11	4	+7	7	Medal round
2	Panama	3	1	2	0	5	4	+1	5	Medal round
3	Peru	3	1	0	2	3	6	−3	3	
4	Canada (H)	3	0	1	2	1	6	−5	1	

Source: Toronto 2015
(H) Hosts
July 12, 2015
17:35

Panama	2–1	Peru
Aguilar 47'; Escobar 90' (pen.)	Report	Maldonado 54'

Hamilton Pan Am Soccer Stadium, Hamilton
Referee: Jeffrey Solís (Costa Rica)

July 16, 2015
17:35

Peru	0–4	Brazil
	Report	Luan 3'; Clayton 20'; Rômulo 26'; Dodô 30'

Hamilton Pan Am Soccer Stadium, Hamilton
Referee: Raúl Castro (Honduras)

July 20, 2015
20:35

Canada	0–2	Peru
	Report	Rodas 12'; James 68' (o.g.)

Hamilton Pan Am Soccer Stadium, Hamilton
Referee: Adrian Skeete (Barbados)

== Golf ==
Peru qualified a full team of four golfers.

Athlete(s)	Event	Final					
Athlete(s)	Event	Round 1	Round 2	Round 3	Round 4	Total	Rank
Luis Barco	Men's individual	70	68	72	78	288 (E)	12
Felipe Strobach	Men's individual	77	73	70	76	296 (+8)	=18
Lucía Gutierrez	Women's individual	74	70	76	75	295 (+7)	7
Simone de Souza	Women's individual	82	80	74	74	310 (+22)	18
Luis Barco; Felipe Strobach; Lucía Gutierrez; Lucia Polo	Mixed team	144	138	144	150	574 (E)	4

== Gymnastics ==
=== Artistic ===
Peru qualified 4 athletes.

Men
Individual

Athlete	Event	Qualification								Final							
Athlete	Event	Apparatus						Total	Rank	Apparatus						Total	Rank
Athlete	Event	F	PH	R	V	PB	HB	Total	Rank	F	PH	R	V	PB	HB	Total	Rank
Daniel Aguero Barrera	Men's All Around	14.200	12.350	10.900	13.750	12.500	11.850	75.550 Q	23	12.600	12.300	11.850	14.300	12.300	12.900	76.250	17
Mauricio Gallegos	Men's All Around	11.550	13.450	12.600	13.650	10.550	11.700	73.500 Q	25	11.600	12.850	12.200	12.650	11.350	12.850	73.500	19

Qualification Legend: Q = Qualified to apparatus final

Women
Individual

Athlete	Event	Qualification						Final					
Athlete	Event	Apparatus				Total	Rank	Apparatus				Total	Rank
Athlete	Event	F	V	UB	BB	Total	Rank	F	V	UB	BB	Total	Rank
Mariana Chiarella	Women's all-around	DNS						did not advance					
Ariana Orrego Martinez	Women's all-around	13.850	12.700	12.150	12.400	51.100 Q	18	13.850	12.800	12.250	13.100	52.000	13

Qualification Legend: Q = Qualified to apparatus final

== Judo ==
Peru qualified a team of four male judokas.

Men

Athlete	Event	Round of 16	Quarterfinals	Semifinals	Repechage	Final / BM	
Athlete	Event	Opposition Result	Opposition Result	Opposition Result	Opposition Result	Opposition Result	Rank
Juan Postigos	60 kg	Bye	Sergio Pessoa (CAN); W 000S1–000S2	Lenin Preciado (ECU); L 000–100	Bye	John Futtinico (COL); L 000–100	=5
Jesus Gavidia	66 kg	Carlos Tondique (CUB); L 000S3–000S2	did not advance				
Jose Luis Arroyo	100 kg	Antony Peña (VEN); L 000S3–101S1	did not advance				
Joshua Santos	+100 kg	Bye	David Moura (BRA); L 000–100	Did not advance	Ramon Pileta (HON); L 000S1–100S1	Did not advance	=7

== Karate ==
Peru qualified 3 athletes.

Key

- KIK: Won by forfeit (Kiken)
- Q: Qualified for the next round

Women

Athlete	Event	Round Robin				Semifinals	Final	
Athlete	Event	Opposition Result	Opposition Result	Opposition Result	Rank	Opposition Result	Opposition Result	Rank
Merly Huamaní	50 kg	Ana Villanueva (DOM); D 0–0	Jusleen Virk (CAN); L 0–3	Aurimer Campos (VEN); L 0–1	4	did not advance		7
Alessandra Vindrola	55 kg	Brandi Robinson (USA); W 1–0	Jessy Reyes (CHI); L 2–3	Stella Urango (COL); W 8–0 ^{KIK}	2 Q	Kate Campbell (CAN); L 0–4	Did not advance	3rd place, bronze medalist(s)
Alexandra Grande	61 kg	Karina Diaz (DOM); D 4–4	Kamille Desjardins (CAN); W 4–3	Jacqueline Factos (ECU); W 9–1	1 Q	Daniela Lepin (CHI); W 5–1	Karina Diaz (DOM); W 4–3	1st place, gold medalist(s)

== Modern pentathlon ==
Peru qualified a team of 3 athletes (2 men and 1 woman).

Men

Athlete	Event	Fencing (Épée One Touch)			Swimming (200m Freestyle)			Riding (Show Jumping)			Shooting/Running (10 m Air Pistol/3000m)			Total Points	Final Rank
Athlete	Event	Results	Rank	MP Points	Time	Rank	MP Points	Penalties	Rank	MP Points	Time	Rank	MP Points	Total Points	Final Rank
Carlos Barrios	Men's	5	130	29	3:09.83	131	29	25	275	12	14:30.03	430	23	966	25
Jeffrey Leyva	Men's	6	138	28	2:45.73	203	27	EL	0	=23	16:49.11	291	29	633	29
Blanca Kometter	Women's	8	177	=16	2:27.09	259	17	51	249	19	16:51.69	289	22	974	19

== Rowing ==
Peru qualified 2 boats and three male athletes.

Athlete	Event	Heats		Repechage		Final	
Athlete	Event	Time	Rank	Time	Rank	Time	Rank
Eduardo Linares	Men's Single Sculls	7.27.35	3 R	7.34.17	3 FB	8:14.28	8
Álvaro Torres; Renzo León García	Men's Double Sculls	6:35.67	2 R	6:57.44	2 FA	6:42.85	5

Qualification Legend: FA=Final A (medal); FB=Final B (non-medal); R=Repechage

== Sailing ==
Peru qualified 6 boats (10 sailors).

Men

Athlete	Event	Race													Net Points	Final Rank
Athlete	Event	1	2	3	4	5	6	7	8	9	10	11	12	M*	Net Points	Final Rank
Stefano Peschiera	Laser	11	(17); BFD	8	17; DNF	9	5	9	3	10	4	8	9	4	97	8

Women

Athlete	Event	Race														Net Points	Final Rank
Athlete	Event	1	2	3	4	5	6	7	8	9	10	11	12	13	M*	Net Points	Final Rank
María Belén Bazo	RS:X	(7); DSQ	5	3	5	3	3	6	5	5	3	5	6	3	10	62	5
Paloma Schmidt	Laser Radial	9	6	4	3	6	(13)	1	9	9	9	11	12	—N/a	DNQ	80	9

Open

Athlete	Event	Race													Net Points	Final Rank
Athlete	Event	1	2	3	4	5	6	7	8	9	10	11	12	M*	Net Points	Final Rank
Jean Paul de Trazegnies Valdez	Sunfish	4	5	8	5	5	(10)	10	1	5	2	6	4	2	57	5
Alonso Collantes; Diego Figueroa	Snipe	9	8	8	3	(10)	10	7	9	5	3	5	7	DNQ	74	8
Jorge Castro; Luis Olcese; Joel Raffo; Christian Sas	J/24	3	5	(7); OCS	5	3	1	3	7 OCS	3	6	4	1	4	45	4

== Shooting ==
Peru qualified ten shooters.

Veteran Francisco Boza added a medal gold to his remarkable career in Shooting Fosa on July 14.

== Synchronized swimming ==
Peru qualified a full team of nine athletes in the team competition only, after Colombia declined its quota earned at the 2014 South American Aquatics Championships. Maria Castillo was the 9th member of the team (reserve) and did not compete in either round of the team competition.

Athlete	Event	Technical Routine		Free Routine (Final)			
Athlete	Event	Points	Rank	Points	Rank	Total Points	Rank
Camila Cayo; Ana Espinoza; Carla Morales; Sandy Quiroz; Karen Rolando; Cielomar Romero; Valeria Romero; Thais Yamashiro	Women's team	66.4587	7	68.8333	7	135.2920	7

== Table tennis ==
Peru has qualified a women's team and three single men.

Men

Athlete	Event	Group Stage				Round of 32	Round of 16	Quarterfinals	Semifinals	Final / BM	
Athlete	Event	Opposition Result	Opposition Result	Opposition Result	Rank	Opposition Result	Opposition Result	Opposition Result	Opposition Result	Opposition Result	Rank
Bryan Blas	Singles	Marcelo Aguirre (PAR); L 2–4	Ricardo Villa (MEX); L 2–4	Daniel Gonzalez (PUR); L 2–4	4	did not advance					
Johan Chavez	Singles	Rodrigo Gilabert (ARG); L 2–4	Manuel Moya (CHI); L 2–4	Thiago Monteiro (BRA); L 0–4	4	did not advance					
Diego Rodriguez	Singles	Eugene Wang (CAN); L 0–4	Miguel Lara (MEX); W 4–1	Emil Santos (DOM); W 4–1	2 Q	Brian Afanador (PUR); L 2–4	did not advance				=17

Women

Athlete	Event	Group Stage				Round of 32	Round of 16	Quarterfinals	Semifinals	Final / BM	
Athlete	Event	Opposition Result	Opposition Result	Opposition Result	Rank	Opposition Result	Opposition Result	Opposition Result	Opposition Result	Opposition Result	Rank
Angela Mori	Singles	Gui Lin (BRA); L 0–4	Alicia Cote (CAN); L 1–4	Camila Arguelles (ARG); L 3–4	4	did not advance					
Janina Nieto	Singles	Ana Codina (ARG); L 0–4	Johenny Valdez (DOM); L 2–4	Paula Medina (COL); L 1–4	4	did not advance					
Gabriela Soto	Singles	Anqi Luo (CAN); L 0–4	Yasiris Ortiz (DOM); W 4–3	Gremlis Arvelo (VEN); L 0–4	3	did not advance					
Angela Mori; Janina Nieto; Gabriela Soto	Team	Brazil; L 0–3	Cuba; L 0–3	—N/a	3	—N/a		did not advance			

== Taekwondo ==
Peru qualified a team of three athletes (one man and two women).

Athlete	Event	Preliminaries	Quarterfinals	Semifinals	Repechage	Bronze Medal	Final	
Athlete	Event	Opposition Result	Opposition Result	Opposition Result	Opposition Result	Opposition Result	Opposition Result	Rank
Luis Oblitas	Men's -58kg	Avella (COL); L 15–16	did not advance					
Julissa Diez	Women's -49kg	Rodriguez (COL); L 1–8	did not advance					
Belen Costa	Women's -57kg	Correa (CHI); L 4–7	did not advance					

== Tennis ==
Peru qualified one athlete in the women's singles event.

Women

Athlete	Event	Round of 32	Round of 16	Quarterfinals	Semifinals	Final / BM	
Athlete	Event	Opposition Score	Opposition Score	Opposition Score	Opposition Score	Opposition Score	Rank
Bianca Botto	Singles	Römer (ECU); W (5-7, 6–4, 6–4)	Davis (USA); L (3–6, 1–6)	did not advance			

== Triathlon ==
Athlete	Event	Swim (1.5 km)	Trans 1	Bike (40 km)	Trans 2	Run (10 km)	Total	Rank
Lorena Imaña	Women's individual	23:39	0:45	LAP				
Delia López	Women's individual	21:55	0:40	1:28:05	0:30	53:55	2:22:32	26
Vivienne Paulett Bustamante	Women's individual	23:15	0:42	LAP				

== Volleyball ==
=== Women's tournament ===
Peru qualified a women's team of 12 athletes.

- Mirtha Uribe
- Carla Rueda
- Brenda Uribe
- Shiamara Almeyda
- Alexandra Muñoz
- Susan Egoavil
- Maguilaura Frias
- Clarivett Yllescas
- Ángela Leyva
- Ginna López
- Andrea Urrutia
- Katherine Regalado

Pos	Team	Pld	W	L	Pts	SPW	SPL	SPR	SW	SL	SR
1	Brazil	3	3	0	10	320	273	1.172	9	5	1.800
2	United States	3	2	1	12	254	200	1.270	8	3	2.667
3	Puerto Rico	3	1	2	7	232	247	0.939	5	6	0.833
4	Peru	3	0	3	1	164	250	0.656	1	9	0.111

Source: Archived 2015-10-20 at the Wayback Machine

Date		Score		Set 1	Set 2	Set 3	Set 4	Set 5	Total	Report
Jul 16	United States	3–0	Peru	25–15	25–13	25–14			75–42	P2P3
Jul 18	Brazil	3–1	Peru	25–27	25–5	25–17	25–16		100–65	P2P3
Jul 20	Puerto Rico	3–0	Peru	25–18	25–16	25–23			75–57	P2P3

2015 Pan American Games 7th place

Peru

== Water skiing ==
Peru qualified a team of four water skiing athletes.

Men

Athlete	Event	Preliminary	Rank	Final	Rank
Mario Mustafa	Jump	43.8	9	did not advance	
Mario Mustafa	Slalom	2.50/58/13.00	15	did not advance	
Mario Mustafa	Tricks	1390	14	did not advance	

Women

Athlete	Event	Preliminary	Rank	Final	Rank
Delfina Cuglievan	Slalom	2.00/55/11.25	3 Q	1.50/55/12.00	4
Delfina Cuglievan	Tricks	1040	11	did not advance	
Natalia Cuglievan	Tricks	7840	3 Q	8360	1st place, gold medalist(s)
Alexandra De Osma	Jump	33.6	6 Q	32.9	6
Alexandra De Osma	Slalom	2.00/55/12.00	=5 Q	2.00/55/13.00	5
Alexandra De Osma	Tricks	4180	8	did not advance	

== Weightlifting ==
Peru qualified a team of 4 athletes (2 men and 2 women).

Athlete	Event	Snatch		Clean & Jerk		Total	Rank
Athlete	Event	Result	Rank	Result	Rank	Total	Rank
Junior Lahuanampa	Men's 69 kg	110	12	150	10	260	11
Oscar Terrones	Men's 69 kg	120	9	150	9	270	9
Tessy Sandi	Women's 58 kg	80	5	103	4	183	4
Angie Cárdenas	Women's 63 kg	79	7	103	7	182	7

== Wrestling ==
Peru qualified 7 wrestlers.

Men

Athlete	Event	Quarterfinals	Semifinals	Final / BM	
Athlete	Event	Opposition Result	Opposition Result	Opposition Result	Rank
Pablo Benites	Freestyle 57 kg	Bye	Angel Escobedo (USA); L 0–6	Emir Hernandez (COL); L 1–6	=5
Pool Ambrocio	Freestyle 86 kg	Luis Miguel Pérez (DOM); W 10–0	Reineris Salas (CUB); L 1–7	Tamerlan Tagziev (CAN); L 0–5	=5
Mario Molina	Greco-Roman 66 kg	Bryce Saddoris (USA); L 0–3	Did not advance	Jefrin Mejia (HON); W 9–4	3rd place, bronze medalist(s)
Luigi Garcia	Greco-Roman 75 kg	Juan Escobar (MEX); L 0–8	did not advance		8

Women

Athlete	Event	Quarterfinals	Semifinals	Final / BM	
Athlete	Event	Opposition Result	Opposition Result	Opposition Result	Rank
Thalia Mallqui	Freestyle 48 kg	Angelica Bustos (ECU); W 3–0	Carolina Castillo (COL); W 4–3	Genevieve Morrison (CAN); L 4–5	2nd place, silver medalist(s)
Yanet Sovero	Freestyle 58 kg	Betzabeth Sarco (VEN); W 3–2	Joice Silva (BRA); L 3–5	Alejandra Romero (MEX); W 6–6	3rd place, bronze medalist(s)
Jessica Olivares	Freestyle 63 kg	Braxton Stone-Papadopoulos (CAN); L 0–10	Did not advance	Jackeline Rentería (COL); L 5–8	=5

== See also ==
- Peru at the 2016 Summer Olympics
