= Water skiing at the 2015 Pan American Games – Men's jump =

Men's jump at the 2015 Pan American Games
- Venue: Ontario Place West Channel
- Dates: July 21 – July 23
- Competitors: 9 from 6 nations

Medalists
Gold medal	Ryan Dodd	Canada
Silver medal	Rodrigo Miranda	Chile
Bronze medal	Felipe Miranda	Chile

The men's jump competition of the Water skiing events at the 2015 Pan American Games in Toronto were held from July 21 to July 23 at the Ontario Place West Channel. The defending champion was Frederick Krueger IV of the United States.

== Results ==
=== Preliminary round ===
Rank	Name	Country	Result	Notes
1	Ryan Dodd	Canada	66.8	Q
2	Rodrigo Miranda	Chile	62.6	Q
3	Felipe Miranda	Chile	60.3	Q
4	Jaret Llewellyn	Canada	59.3	Q
5	Javier Julio	Argentina	56.4	Q
6	Sandro Ambrosi	Mexico	53.9	Q
7	Santiago Correa	Colombia	52.0	Q
8	Mateo Botero	Colombia	49.0	Q
9	Mario Mustafa	Peru	43.8	

=== Final ===
Rank	Name	Country	Result	Notes
1st place, gold medalist(s)	Ryan Dodd	Canada	64.8	
2nd place, silver medalist(s)	Rodrigo Miranda	Chile	62.1	
3rd place, bronze medalist(s)	Felipe Miranda	Chile	59.9	
4	Jaret Llewellyn	Canada	59.9	
5	Sandro Ambrosi	Mexico	51.5	
6	Mateo Botero	Colombia	49.3	
7	Santiago Correa	Colombia	47.1	
8	Javier Julio	Argentina	DNS	
