= Water skiing at the 2015 Pan American Games – Men's overall =

Men's overall at the 2015 Pan American Games
- Venue: Ontario Place West Channel
- Dates: July 22
- Competitors: 6 from 5 nations

Medalists
Gold medal	Felipe Miranda	Chile
Silver medal	Jaret Llewellyn	Canada
Bronze medal	Javier Julio	Argentina

The men's overall competition of the Water skiing events at the 2015 Pan American Games in Toronto were held on July 22 at the Ontario Place West Channel. The defending champion was Javier Julio of Argentina.

== Results ==
=== Final ===
Rank	Name	Country	Trick	Ov. Trick	Slalom	Ov. Slalom	Jump	Ov. Jump	Overall
1st place, gold medalist(s)	Felipe Miranda	Chile	8950	863.9	5.00/58/11.25	1000.0	58.9	913.7	2777.6
2nd place, silver medalist(s)	Jaret Llewellyn	Canada	360	1000.0	2.50/58/12.00	751.1	62.1	1000.0	2757.1
3rd place, bronze medalist(s)	Javier Julio	Argentina	7070	682.4	5.00/58/11.25	1000.0	57.4	873.3	2555.7
4	Rodrigo Miranda	Chile	8120	783.8	4.00/58/12.00	800.0	58.8	911.1	2494.9
5	Sandro Ambrosi	Mexico	6610	638.0	3.50/58/11.25	957.1	48.4	630.7	2225.8
6	Adam Pickos	United States							DNS
