= Sailing at the 2015 Pan American Games – Snipe =

Snipe at the 2015 Pan American Games
- Venue: Royal Canadian Yacht Club
- Dates: July 12 - July 19
- Competitors: 20 from 10 nations

Medalists
Gold medal	Raúl Ríos; Fernando Monllor	Puerto Rico
Silver medal	Luis Soubie; Diego Lipszyc	Argentina
Bronze medal	Augie Diaz; Kathleen Tocke	United States

The Snipe competition of the sailing events at the 2015 Pan American Games in Toronto was held from July 12 to July 19 at the Royal Canadian Yacht Club.

Points were assigned based on the finishing position in each race (1 for first, 2 for second, etc.). The points were totaled from the top 11 results of the first 12 races, with lower totals being better. If a team was disqualified or did not complete the race, 11 points were assigned for that race (as there were 10 teams in this competition). The top 5 teams at that point competed in the final race, with placings counting double for final score. The team with the lowest total score won.

== Schedule ==
All times are Eastern Daylight Time (UTC-4).

Date	Time	Round
July 12, 2015	11:35	Race 1
July 13, 2015	11:35	Races 2 and 3
July 14, 2015	11:35	Races 4 and 5
July 15, 2015	11:35	Races 6 and 7
July 16, 2015	11:35	Races 8, 9 and 10
July 17, 2015	11:35	Races 11 and 12
July 19, 2015	14:35	Medal race

== Results ==
Race M is the medal race.

Rank	Athlete	Nation	Race													Total Points	Net Points
Rank	Athlete	Nation	1	2	3	4	5	6	7	8	9	10	11	12	M	Total Points	Net Points
1st place, gold medalist(s)	Raúl Ríos; Fernando Monllor	Puerto Rico	2	2	2	(7)	1	1	1	1	1	4	1	2	2	27	20
2nd place, silver medalist(s)	Luis Soubié; Diego Lipszyc	Argentina	1	1	(9)	2	3	5	2	3	2	5	3	3	8	47	38
3rd place, bronze medalist(s)	Augie Diaz; Kathleen Tocke	United States	(7)	5	1	1	6	3	3	2	7	2	2	4	10	53	46
4	Esteban Echavarria; Juan Restrepo	Colombia	5	6	3	8	2	8	6	4	3	1	(10)	5	4	65	55
5	Evert McLaughlin; Alexandra Damley-Strnad	Canada	3	3	6	5	(9)	4	8	5	6	7	7	8	6	77	68
6	Alexandre Paradeda; Georgia Rodrigues	Brazil	8	(11); RET	5	6	8	7	5	7	4	9	4	1		75	64
7	Raúl Díaz; Rafael García	Cuba	4	4	4	4	5	6	9	6	(11); OSC	10	9	9		81	70
8	Diego Figueroa; Alonso Collantes	Peru	9	8	8	3	(10)	10	7	9	5	3	5	7		84	74
9	Antonio Poncell; Pedro Vera	Chile	(10)	7	7	10	4	2	10	8	9	6	8	10		91	81
10	Édgar Diminich; Iberth Constate	Ecuador	6	9	(10)	9	7	9	4	10	8	8	6	6		92	82
