= Chile at the 2015 Pan American Games =

- IOC code: CHI
- NOC: Comité Olímpico de Chile

in Toronto, Canada 10–26 July 2015
- Competitors: 306 in 34 sports
- Flag bearer (opening): Isidora Jiménez
- Flag bearer (closing): Erika Olivera
- Medals Ranked 11th: Gold 5 Silver 6 Bronze 18 Total 29

Pan American Games appearances (overview)
- 1951; 1955; 1959; 1963; 1967; 1971; 1975; 1979; 1983; 1987; 1991; 1995; 1999; 2003; 2007; 2011; 2015; 2019; 2023

Chile competed in the 2015 Pan American Games in Toronto, Ontario, Canada, from July 10 to 26, 2015.

Track and field athlete Isidora Jiménez won a public vote, and thus was named the flagbearer of the country at the opening ceremony.

== Competitors ==
The following table lists Chile's delegation per sport and gender.

Sport	Men	Women	Total
Archery	3	3	6
Athletics	24	13	37
Badminton	2	2	4
Beach volleyball	2	2	4
Bowling		2	2
Boxing	2		2
Canoeing	7	3	10
Cycling	13	9	22
Diving	2	2	4
Equestrian	12	1	13
Fencing	7	3	10
Field hockey	16	16	32
Golf	2	2	4
Gymnastics	5	3	8
Handball	15	15	30
Judo	2	2	4
Karate	4	4	8
Modern pentathlon	2	2	4
Racquetball	0	2	2
Roller sports	3	3	6
Rowing	7	4	11
Rugby sevens	12		12
Sailing	10	4	14
Shooting	7	4	11
Squash	3	3	6
Swimming	2	3	5
Synchronized swimming		2	2
Table tennis	3	3	6
Taekwondo	3	2	5
Tennis	2	3	5
Triathlon	3	3	6
Water skiing	2	2	4
Weightlifting	2	2	4
Wrestling	3		3
Total	182	124	306

== Medalists ==
The following competitors from Chile won medals at the games. In the by discipline sections below, medalists' names are bolded.

Medal	Name	Sport	Event	Date
Gold	Bárbara Riveros	Triathlon	Women's	July 11
Gold	Emanuelle Silva	Roller sports	Men's 200 m time trial	July 12
Gold	Felipe Leal; Óscar Vásquez	Rowing	Men's Coxless Pair	July 14
Gold	Nicolás Jarry; Hans Podlipnik	Tennis	Men´s doubles	July 15
Gold	Felipe Miranda	Water skiing	Men's overall	July 22
Silver	Melita Abraham; Antonia Abraham	Rowing	Women's Coxless Pair	July 13
Silver	Fernanda Valdés	Weightlifting	Women's 75kg	July 14
Silver	Andrés Ayub	Wrestling	Men's Greco-Roman 130 kg	July 16
Silver	Kristel Köbrich	Swimming	Women's 800m freestyle	July 18
Silver	Gabriela Bruna	Karate	Women's 50kg	July 23
Silver	Rodrigo Miranda	Water Skiing	Men's Jump	July 23
Bronze	Marisol Villarroel	Roller sports	Women's 200 m time trial	July 12
Bronze	María José Moya	Roller sports	Women´s 200 m time-trial	July 12
Bronze	Soraya Jadue	Rowing	Women´s single sculls	July 14
Bronze	Andrés Oyarzún; Luis Saumann; Felipe Cárdenas; Bernardo Guerrero	Rowing	Men's lightweight coxless four	July 15
Bronze	Cristobál Torres	Wrestling	Men's Greco-Roman 59 kg	July 15
Bronze	Francisca Crovetto	Shooting	Women´s Skeet	July 18
Bronze	Sergio Baeza; Marc Jux; Cristobál Lira; Matías Seguel	Sailing	J/24	July 19
Bronze	Felipe Aguilar	Golf	Men's individual	July 19
Bronze	Andrés Ducasse	Sailing	Sunfish	July 19
Bronze	Natalia Ducó	Athletics	Women's shot put	July 22
Bronze	Miguel Veliz	Boxing	Men's heavyweight	July 22
Bronze	Felipe Miranda	Water Skiing	Men's Jump	July 23
Bronze	Fernanda Naser	Water Skiing	Women's Jump	July 23
Bronze	Jessy Reyes	Karate	Women's 55kg	July 23
Bronze	Daniela Lepín	Karate	Women's 61kg	July 24
Bronze	Chile men's national field hockey team	Field hockey	Men's tournament	July 25
Bronze	Víctor Aravena	Athletics	Men's 5000 metres	July 25
Bronze	Chile men's national handball team	Handball	Men's tournament	July 25

**Medals by sport**
**Sport**	1st place, gold medalist(s)	2nd place, silver medalist(s)	3rd place, bronze medalist(s)	**Total**
Rowing	1	1	2	4
Water skiing	1	1	2	4
Roller sports	1	0	2	3
Tennis	1	0	0	1
Triathlon	1	0	0	1
Karate	0	1	2	3
Wrestling	0	1	1	2
Swimming	0	1	0	1
Weightlifting	0	1	0	1
Sailing	0	0	2	2
Athletics	0	0	2	2
Boxing	0	0	1	1
Field hockey	0	0	1	1
Golf	0	0	1	1
Handball	0	0	1	1
Shooting	0	0	1	1
**Total**	**5**	**6**	**18**	**29**

**Medals by day**
**Day**	1st place, gold medalist(s)	2nd place, silver medalist(s)	3rd place, bronze medalist(s)	**Total**
July 11	1	0	0	1
July 12	1	0	2	3
July 13	0	1	0	1
July 14	1	1	1	3
July 15	1	0	2	3
July 16	0	1	0	1
July 17	0	0	0	0
July 18	0	1	1	2
July 19	0	0	3	3
July 20	0	0	0	0
July 21	0	0	0	0
July 22	1	0	2	3
July 23	0	2	3	5
July 24	0	0	1	1
July 25	0	0	3	3
July 26	0	0	0	0
**Total**	**5**	**6**	**18**	**29**

**Medals by gender**
**Gender**	1st place, gold medalist(s)	2nd place, silver medalist(s)	3rd place, bronze medalist(s)	**Total**
Male	4	2	10	16
Female	1	4	8	13
**Total**	**5**	**6**	**18**	**29**

**Multiple medalists**
**Name**	**Sport**	1st place, gold medalist(s)	2nd place, silver medalist(s)	3rd place, bronze medalist(s)	**Total**
Felipe Miranda	Water Skiing	1	0	1	2

== Archery ==
Chile qualified three male and two female archers based on its performance at the 2014 Pan American Championships. Later Chile qualified 1 more women based on its performance at the 2015 Copa Merengue.

Men

Athlete	Event	Ranking Round		Round of 32	Round of 16	Quarterfinals	Semifinals	Final / BM	Rank
Athlete	Event	Score	Seed	Opposition Score	Opposition Score	Opposition Score	Opposition Score	Opposition Score	Rank
Andres Aguilar Gimpel	Individual	643	16	Robles (ARG); L 4-5	Did not advance				
Guillermo Aguilar Gimpel	Individual	650	13	Rezende Xavier (BRA); L 4-6	Did not advance				
Felipe Perez Alvarez	Individual	595	31	Klimitchek (USA); L 7-1	Did not advance				
Andres Aguilar Gimpel; Guillermo Aguilar Gimpel; Felipe Perez Alvarez	Team	1888	7	—N/a		Mexico; L 0-6	Did not advance		

Women

Athlete	Event	Ranking Round		Round of 32	Round of 16	Quarterfinals	Semifinals	Final / BM	Rank
Athlete	Event	Score	Seed	Opposition Score	Opposition Score	Opposition Score	Opposition Score	Opposition Score	Rank
Keiko Chang	Individual	564	29	Hinojosa (MEX); L 2-6	Did not advance				
Tania Maldonaldo	Individual	587	23	Sarduy (CUB); L 1-7	Did not advance				
Ignacia Marquez	Individual	585	24	Rendón (COL); L 2-6	Did not advance				
Keiko Chang; Tania Maldonado; Ignacia Marquez	Team	1736	9	—N/a	Argentina; W 6-0	Mexico; L 0-6	Did not advance		

== Athletics ==
Men
Track and road events

Athletes	Event	Heats		Semifinal		Final	
Athletes	Event	Time	Rank	Time	Rank	Time	Rank
Alfredo Sepúlveda	400 m hurdles	—N/a		52,32	16°		Did not advance
Carlos Díaz	1500 m	—N/a				3:42.09	4
Iván Lopez	1500 m	—N/a				3:48.54	10
Víctor Aravena	5000 m	—N/a				13:46.94	3rd place, bronze medalist(s)
Leslie Encina	10000 m	—N/a				30:30.12	8
Mauricio Valdivia	3000 m steeplechase	—N/a				8:52.72	5
Enzo Yáñez	3000 m steeplechase	—N/a				9:07.75	9
Roberto Echeverría	marathon	—N/a					Did not finish
Cristhoper Guajardo	marathon	—N/a					DSQ
Franco Boccardo; Enzo Faulbaum; Enrique Polanco; Cristián Reyes; Sebastian Valdivia	4 × 100 m relay	—N/a		40,14	12°	Did not advance	
Sergio Aldea; Nicolás Dagnino; Sergio Germain; Alfredo Sepúlveda; Martín Tagle	4 × 400 m relay	—N/a		3:09.89	10°	Did not advance	
Yerko Araya	20 km walk	—N/a				DSQ	
Edward Araya	50 km walk	—N/a				DSQ	

Field events

Athletes	Event	Semifinal		Final	
Athletes	Event	Result	Rank	Result	Rank
Daniel Zupeuc	Pole vault	—N/a			NM
Daniel Pineda	Long jump	7,59	11°Q	7,46	11
Álvaro Petersen	triple jump	—N/a		16,16	8
Humberto Mansilla	hammer throw	—N/a		66,14	10

Women
Track and road events

Athletes	Event	Heats		Semifinal		Final	
Athletes	Event	Time	Rank	Time	Rank	Time	Rank
Isidora Jiménez	100 m	11,33 Q	13°	11,37	16°	Did not advance	
Isidora Jiménez	200 m	22,95 Q	4°	22,96	10°	Did not advance	
Érika Olivera	marathon	—N/a				2:52.27	11
Paula Goñi; José Gutiérrez; Isidora Jiménez; Fernanda Mackenna; Viviana Olivares; Fernanda Mackenna; Macarena Reyes	4 × 100 m relay	—N/a		45,38	10°	Did not advance	
Javiera Errázuriz; Paula Goñi; Fernanda Mackenna; Carmen Mansilla; Clara Marín	4 × 400 m relay	—N/a		3:41.35	12°	Did not advance	

Field events

Athletes	Event	Semifinal		Final	
Athletes	Event	Result	Rank	Result	Rank
Macarena Reyes	Long jump	—N/a		5,99	13
Natalia Ducó	shot put	—N/a		18,01	3rd place, bronze medalist(s)
Karen Gallardo	discus throw	—N/a		59,11	5

== Badminton ==
Chile has qualified a team of four athletes (two men and two women).

Men

Athlete	Event	First round	Second round	Third round	Quarterfinals	Semifinals	Final	Rank
Athlete	Event	Opposition Result	Opposition Result	Opposition Result	Opposition Result	Opposition Result	Opposition Result	Rank
Iván León	Men's singles	Bye	Guerrero (CUB); L 2–21, 9–21	Did not advance				
Cristian Araya	Men's singles	R Ramírez (GUA); L 9–21, 8–21	Did not advance					
Cristian Araya; Iván León	Men's doubles	Bye	Cabrera / Javier (DOM); 19–21, 18–21)	Did not advance				

Women

Athlete	Event	First round	Second round	Third round	Quarterfinals	Semifinals	Final	Rank
Athlete	Event	Opposition Result	Opposition Result	Opposition Result	Opposition Result	Opposition Result	Opposition Result	Rank
Camila Macaya	Women's singles	Bye	Vicente (BRA); L 17–21, 11–21	Did not advance				
Tingting Chou	Women's singles	Bye	Williams (JAM); W 21–16, 21–8	Vicente (BRA); L 10–21, 10–21	Did not advance			
Camila Macaya; Tingting Chou	Women's doubles	Bye		Bruce / Chan (CAN); L 11–21, 21–23	Did not advance			

Mixed

Athlete	Event	First round	Second round	Quarterfinals	Semifinals	Final	Rank
Athlete	Event	Opposition Result	Opposition Result	Opposition Result	Opposition Result	Opposition Result	Rank
Cristian Araya; Tingting Chou	Mixed doubles	Ramdhani / Ramdhani (GUY); W 21–7, 21–15	Martínez (CUB); Oropeza (CUB); L 15–21, 16–21	Did not advance			
Iván León; Camila Macaya	Mixed doubles	Javier / Saturria (DOM); L 21–19, 19–21, 19–21	Did not advance				

== Beach volleyball ==
Chile has qualified a men's and women's pair for a total of four athletes.

Men

Athlete	Event	Preliminary Round			Quarterfinals	Semifinals	Bronze medal	Final
Athlete	Event	Opposition Score	Opposition Score	Opposition Score	Opposition Score	Opposition Score	Opposition Score	Rank
Esteban Grimalt; Marco Grimalt	Men's	Talavera / Vargas (ESA); W (21-11, 21-12)	Williams / Withfield (TRI); W (21-11, 22-20)	Rodríguez / Haddock (PUR); W (21-19, 21-11)	Capogrosso / Mehamed (ARG); W (21-18, 21-12)	Ontiveros / Virgen (MEX); L (18-21, 13-21)	Diaz / Gonzalez (CUB); L (21-18, 23-25, 15-12)	4

Women

Athlete	Event	Preliminary Round			Quarterfinals	9th to 12th Round	9th to 10th Round	Final
Athlete	Event	Opposition Score	Opposition Score	Opposition Score	Opposition Score	Opposition Score	Opposition Score	Rank
Pilar Mardones; Francisca Rivas	Women's	Alfaro / Cope (CRC); L (21-16, 14-21, 11-15)	Horta / Maestrini (BRA); L (16-21, 7-21)	Machado / Rodriguez (NCA); W (21-13, 14-21, 15-10)	Gallay / Klug (ARG); L (9-21, 10-21)	Molina / Soler (ESA); W (21-15, 19-21, 15-8)	Candelas / Revuelta (MEX); L (17-21, 20-22)	10

== Boxing ==
Chile qualified two male boxers

Men

Athlete	Event	Quarterfinals	Semifinals	Final
Athlete	Event	Opposition Result	Opposition Result	Opposition Result
Joseph Cherkashyn	Middleweight	Saavedra (VEN); L 0–3	Did not advance	
Miguel Veliz	Heavyweight	Flores (VEN); W 3–0	Erislandy Savón (CUB); L 0–3	3rd place, bronze medalist(s)

== Canoeing ==
=== Slalom ===
Chile has qualified the following boats:

Athlete(s)	Event	Preliminary						Semifinal		Final	
Athlete(s)	Event	Run 1	Rank	Run 2	Rank	Best	Rank	Time	Rank	Time	Rank
Andraz Echeverría	Men's K-1	132.83	7	121.01	8	121.01	9	Did not advance			
Maritza Gajardo	Women's K-1	563.58	8	433.72	6	433.72	8	Did not advance			

=== Sprint ===
Chile has qualified 8 athletes in the sprint discipline (4 in men's kayak and 1 in women's kayak, 2 in men's canoe and 1 in women's canoe).

Men

Athlete	Event	Final	
Athlete	Event	Time	Rank
Manuel Chacano; Jean Neira; Fernando Nicolas; Rene Susperreguy	K-4 1000 m	3:17.865	8
Johnnathan Tafra; José Tafra	C-2 1000 m	4:12.817	6

Women

Athlete	Event	Heats		Semifinals		Final	
Athlete	Event	Time	Rank	Time	Rank	Time	Rank
Jeanarett Valenzuela Soto	K-1 200 m	47.865	6 QS	47.795	5	Did not advance	
Karen Roco	C-1 200 m	—N/a				53.634	4

Qualification Legend: QF = Qualify to final; QS = Qualify to semifinal

== Cycling ==
=== Mountain ===
Chile qualified three mountain bikers.

Mountain biking

Athlete	Event	Time	Rank
Patricio Farias	Men's cross-country	1:42:48	15
Javier Püschel	Men's cross-country	1:41:57	14
Fernanda Castro	Women's cross-country	LAP	

=== Road ===
Men

Athlete	Event	Time	Rank
Patricio Almonacid	Road race	3:46:51	20
Gonzalo Garrido	Road race	DNF	
Christopher Mansilla	Road race	3:47:17	21
Luis Fernando Sepúlveda	Road race	3:46:36	16

Women

Athlete	Event	Time	Rank
Daniela Guajardo	Road race	2:07:53	19
Paola Muñoz	Road race	2:07:51	6
Karla Vallejos	Road race	2:07:52	12

=== Track ===
Team Pursuit

Athlete	Event	Qualification		First round		Final	
Athlete	Event	Time	Rank	Opponent Results	Rank	Opponent Results	Rank
Antonio Cabrera; Gonzalo Miranda; Pablo Seisdedos; Luis Fernando Sepúlveda	Men's	4:17.068	5 Q	No opponent 4:13.793	6	Brazil (BRA); Did not start	6
Denísse Ahumada; Daniela Guajardo; Valentina Monsalve; Flor Palma	Women's	4:46.067	6 Q	Colombia (COL); L 4:42.817	7	Guatemala (GUA); W Overlapped	7

Omnium

Athlete	Event	Scratch race	Individual pursuit		Elimination race	Time trial		Flying lap		Points race		Total points	Rank
Athlete	Event	Rank	Time	Rank	Rank	Time	Rank	Time	Rank	Points	Rank	Total points	Rank
Cristopher Mansilla	Men's	8	4:47.760	9	7	1:05.894	6	13.644	3	41	3	185	6
Denísse Ahumada	Women's	3	3:49.714	6	3	40.051	11	16.002	10				
8	107	8											

== Diving ==
Chile qualified four divers (two men and two women).

Athlete	Event	Preliminary		Final	
Athlete	Event	Points	Rank	Points	Rank
Diego Carquin	Men's 3 m springboard	297.55	17	Did not advance	
Donato Neglia	Men's 3 m springboard	370.10	7 Q	392.35	8
Diego Carquin; Donato Neglia	Men's synchronized 3 m springboard	—N/a		324.09	7
Wendy Esquivel	Women's 3 m springboard	212.15	12 Q	185.35	12
Paula Sotomayor	Women's 3 m springboard	179.45	15	Did not advance	
Wendy Esquivel; Paula Sotomayor	Women's synchronized 3 m springboard	—N/a		205.92	7

== Field hockey ==
Chile has qualified both a men's and women's teams for a total of 32 athletes (16 men and 16 women).

=== Men's tournament ===
- Richardo Achondo
- Prada A. Berczely
- Fernando Binder Wiener
- Felipe Eggers
- Andres Fuenzalida
- Ignacio Gajardo
- Adrian Henriquez
- Thomas Kannegiesser
- Seba Kapsch
- Vicente Martin Tarud
- Fernando Renz
- Nicolas Renz
- Sven Richter
- Martin Rodriguez Ducaud
- Raimundo Valenzuela
- Jaime Zarhi

Pool B

Pos	Team	Pld	W	D	L	GF	GA	GD	Pts	Qualification
1	Canada (H)	3	3	0	0	18	2	+16	9	Quarter-finals
2	Chile	3	2	0	1	6	4	+2	6	Quarter-finals
3	Brazil	3	1	0	2	3	12	−9	3	Quarter-finals
4	Mexico	3	0	0	3	3	12	−9	0	Quarter-finals

Source: FIH
Rules for classification: 1) points; 2) matches won; 3) goal difference; 4) goals for; 5) head-to-head result.
(H) Hosts

14 July 2015
17:00

Chile	3–2	Mexico
Richter 25'; Martín 34'; Rodríguez 56'	Report	Campillo 2'; Pedraza 55'

Umpires:
Grant Hundley (USA)
Donny Gobinsingh (TTO)

16 July 2015
19:00

Chile	0–1	Canada
	Report	Pearson 6'

Umpires:
Federico Garcia (URU)
Saleem Aaron (USA)

18 July 2015
17:00

Brazil	1–3	Chile
Borges 42'	Report	N. Renz 11'; Richter 14'; Rodríguez 40'

Umpires:
Saleem Aaron (USA)
Grant Hundley (USA)

Quarterfinal

21 July 2015
11:30

Chile	6–2	Cuba
Prada 38'; Richter 43'; F. Renz 46'; Martín 47', 60'; Rodríguez 57'	Report	Blanco 15'; Tritzant 51'

Umpires:
You Suolong (CHN)
Andres Ledesma (ARG)

Semifinal

23 July 2015
17:00

Argentina	6–0	Chile
Vila 6'; Peillat 30', 42', 44'; Paredes 44'; Brunet 60'	Report

Umpires:
Suolong You (CHN)
Federico Garcia (URU)

Bronze medal match

25 July 2015
17:00

(bronze) Chile	4–1	Brazil
N. Renz 5', 32'; Kannegiesser 19'; Martín 20'	Report	Smith 60'

Umpires:
Andres Ledesma (ARG)
Grant Hundley (USA)

2015 Pan American Games 3rd

Chile

=== Women's tournament ===
The Chile field hockey women's team that will compete at the 2015 Pan American Games:

Head Coach: Ronald Stein

1. Claudia Schüler (GK)
2. Sofía Walbaum
4. Javiera Villagra
5. Francisca Pizarro
7. Sofía Filipek
8. Carolina García
9. Francisca Vidaurre
10. Manuela Urroz
13. Camila Caram (C)
14. Francisca Tala
15. Daniela Caram
16. Constanza Palma
17. María Bastías
18. Denise Krimerman
20. Agustina Venegas
21. Josefa Villalabeitia

Pool B

Pos	Team	Pld	W	D	L	GF	GA	GD	Pts	Qualification
1	United States	3	3	0	0	19	0	+19	9	Quarterfinals
2	Chile	3	2	0	1	10	4	+6	6	Quarterfinals
3	Uruguay	3	1	0	2	3	10	−7	3	Quarterfinals
4	Cuba	3	0	0	3	4	22	−18	0	Quarterfinals

Source: FIH
Rules for classification: 1) points; 2) goal difference; 3) goals scored; 4) head-to-head result.

13 July 2015
09:00

Chile	7–2	Cuba
D. Caram 6', 16'; Villagra 27'; García 44'; Pizarro 47'; Filipek 47'; C. Caram 58'	Report	Sierra 24', 27'

Umpires:
Megan Robertson (CAN)
Stephanie Judefind (USA)

15 July 2015
09:00

Chile	0–2	United States
	Report	Witmer 7'; Selenski 13'

Umpires:
Verónica Villafañe (ARG)
Michelle Joubert (RSA)

17 July 2015
11:00

Uruguay	0–3	Chile
	Report	García 6'; Urroz 7'; C. Caram 49'

Umpires:
Megan Robertson (CAN)
Soledad Iparraguirre (ARG)

Quarterfinal

20 July 2015
11:30

Chile	7–0	Mexico
García 1'; Villagra 11'; Urroz 24', 34', 44'; Vidaurre 37'; Venegas 40'	Report

Umpires:
Aleesha Unka (NZL)
Ayanna McClean (TTO)

Semifinal

22 July 2015
17:00

Argentina	5–0	Chile
Cavallero 6', 8'; Albertarrio 37'; Merino 44', 48'	Report

Umpires:
Michelle Joubert (RSA)
Suzi Sutton (USA)

Bronze medal match

24 July 2015
17:00

Chile	0–1	Canada (bronze)
	Report	Stairs 51'

Umpires:
Stephanie Judefind (USA)
Suzi Sutton (USA)

2015 Pan American Games 4th

Chile

== Golf ==
Athlete	Event	Round 1	Round 2	Round 3	Round 4	Total		
Athlete	Event	Score	Score	Score	Score	Score	Par	Rank
Felipe Aguilar	Men's	69	67	69	71	276	–12	3rd place, bronze medalist(s)
Mark Tullo	Men's	74	69	74	70	287	–1	11
Valentina Haupt	Women's	82	83	79	81	325	37	24
Pilar Schele	Women's	90	90	84	82	346	58	30
Felipe Aguilar; Mark Tullo; Pilar Schele; Valentina Haupt	Mixed team	151	150	148	151	600	24	13

== Gymnastics ==
=== Artistic ===
Chile qualified 8 athletes.

Men
Team & Individual Qualification

Athlete	Event	Final							
Athlete	Event	Apparatus						Total	Rank
Athlete	Event	F	PH	R	V	PB	HB	Total	Rank
	Qualification								
Total	Team								

Qualification Legend: Q = Qualified to apparatus final

Women

Athlete	Event	Qualification						Final					
Athlete	Event	Apparatus				Total	Rank	Apparatus				Total	Rank
Athlete	Event	F	V	UB	BB	Total	Rank	F	V	UB	BB	Total	Rank
	All-Around												

Qualification Legend: Q = Qualified to apparatus final

=== Rhythmic ===
Chile has qualified one athlete.

Individual

Athlete	Event	Final					
Athlete	Event	Hoop	Ball	Clubs	Ribbon	Total	Rank
Valeska González	Individual	11.192	11.317	9.925	11.417	43.851	14

Qualification Legend: Q = Qualified to apparatus final

== Handball ==
Chile has qualified a men's and women's teams. Each team will consist of 15 athletes, for a total of 30.

=== Men's tournament ===
The Chile handball men's team that will compete at the 2015 Pan American Games:

Head coach: (Chile) Fernando Capurro

No.	Pos.	Name	Date of birth (age)	Height	App.	Goals	Club
1	GK	Felipe Barrientos	12 June 1984 (age 42)	1.87 m	75	1	(Chile) Italiano
2	LW	Sebastián Ceballos	1 July 1992 (age 34)	1.75 m	16	31	(Spain) Zamora
3	P	Alfredo Valenzuela	13 February 1986 (age 40)	1.82 m	57		(Chile) Italiano
4	RW	Pablo Baeza	11 November 1988 (age 37)	1.78 m	11		(Chile) Luterano
5	CB	Nicolás Jofre	16 October 1984 (age 41)	1.80 m	73	66	(Chile) Santiago Steel
7	LB	Diego Reyes	24 July 1992 (age 34)	1.82 m	37	59	(Spain) Zamora
8	RW	Erik Caniu	2 October 1988 (age 37)	1.85 m	5	9	(Chile) Luterano
9	LB	Javier Frelijj	28 January 1991 (age 35)	1.90 m	5	24	(Chile) Luterano
10	CB	Cristián Moll Ramírez	13 March 1993 (age 33)	1.85 m	32	44	(Spain) Pedro Alonso Niño
11	RB	Felipe Maurin	31 August 1984 (age 41)	1.88 m	66		(Chile) Ovalle
13	CB	Guillermo Araya	6 August 1985 (age 40)	1.85 m	73	90	(Chile) Ovalle
14	L	Esteban Salinas	18 January 1992 (age 34)	1.80 m	41	92	(Spain) Zamora
16	GK	René Oliva	7 March 1987 (age 39)	1.96 m	48	0	(Chile) Ovalle
17	RB	Rodrigo Salinas Muñoz	25 February 1989 (age 37)	1.88 m	62	172	(Romania) Steaua București
29	L	Marco Oneto (c)	3 June 1982 (age 44)	2.04 m	87	195	(Germany) GWD Minden

Group B

Team	Pld	W	D	L	GF	GA	GD	Pts	Qualification
Argentina	3	3	0	0	103	63	+40	6	Qualified for the Semifinals
Chile	3	1	1	1	87	84	+3	3	Qualified for the Semifinals
Cuba	3	1	1	1	87	89	−2	3	
Puerto Rico	3	0	0	3	68	109	−41	0	

July 17; 20:30	Chile	33–23	Puerto Rico	Exhibition Centre – Hall B Referees: Minore, Marina (ARG)
July 17; 20:30	Araya 8	(18–7)	Nazario 9	Exhibition Centre – Hall B Referees: Minore, Marina (ARG)
July 17; 20:30	3× (yellow card) 2× (suspension) 1× (red card)	report	3× (yellow card) 7× (suspension)	Exhibition Centre – Hall B Referees: Minore, Marina (ARG)

July 19; 20:30	Cuba	31–31	Chile	Exhibition Centre – Hall B Referees: Gjeding, Hansen (DEN)
July 19; 20:30	Robles 8	(14–13)	R. Salinas 12	Exhibition Centre – Hall B Referees: Gjeding, Hansen (DEN)
July 19; 20:30	2× (yellow card) 7× (suspension)	Report	3× (yellow card) 8× (suspension)	Exhibition Centre – Hall B Referees: Gjeding, Hansen (DEN)

July 21; 20:30	Argentina	30–23	Chile	Exhibition Centre – Hall B Referees: Pinto, Menezes (BRA)
July 21; 20:30	Fernandez, Vieyra 8	(20–12)	Araya 7	Exhibition Centre – Hall B Referees: Pinto, Menezes (BRA)
July 21; 20:30	3× (yellow card) 6× (suspension) 2× (red card)	report	3× (yellow card) 4× (suspension) 1× (red card)	Exhibition Centre – Hall B Referees: Pinto, Menezes (BRA)

Semifinals

July 23; 13:30	Brazil	34–24	Chile	Exhibition Centre – Hall B Referees: Gjeding, Hansen (DEN)
July 23; 13:30	Guimarães 5	(15–12)	Salinas 10	Exhibition Centre – Hall B Referees: Gjeding, Hansen (DEN)
July 23; 13:30	2× (yellow card) 5× (suspension)	report	3× (yellow card) 4× (suspension) 1× (red card)	Exhibition Centre – Hall B Referees: Gjeding, Hansen (DEN)

Bronze medal match

July 25; 17:30	(bronze) Chile	23–17	Uruguay	Exhibition Centre – Hall B Referees: Minore, Marina (ARG)
July 25; 17:30	Salinas 6	(10–9)	Fabra 4	Exhibition Centre – Hall B Referees: Minore, Marina (ARG)
July 25; 17:30	2× (yellow card) 2× (suspension)	report	2× (yellow card) 4× (suspension)	Exhibition Centre – Hall B Referees: Minore, Marina (ARG)

=== Women's tournament ===
Head coach: Juan Moreno

No.	Pos.	Name	Date of birth (age)	Height	App.	Goals	Club
3		Belén Canessa	22 September 1990 (age 35)		1
4	RB	Daniela Miño	10 October 1996 (age 29)	1.72 m	22		(France) Fieury
7	LB	Nicole Llanos	12 September 1991 (age 34)	1.60 m	20		(Chile) BM Irene-USAB EC
8	LB	Francisca Zavala	9 November 1996 (age 29)	1.74 m	8		(Chile) BM La Reina
10	CB	Inga Feuchtmann	10 February 1985 (age 41)	1.70 m	61		(Germany) TSG OBER Echbach
11	LW	Valeria Flores	24 October 1984 (age 41)	1.59 m	71		(Spain) BM Bolaños
12	GK	Andrea Cisterna	23 March 1986 (age 40)	1.69 m	56		(Chile) BM Ovalle
13	RB	Maria Musalem	6 September 1983 (age 42)	1.69 m	73		Hypo Austria
16	P	Alicia Torres	1 June 1993 (age 33)	1.72 m	22		(Spain) Aula Cultural
17	P	Daniela Caessa	21 January 1986 (age 40)	1.69 m	66		(Italy) Nuova Teramo
18	RW	Constanza Deuster	2 August 1994 (age 31)	1.64 m	5		U de Chile
19	GK	Antonella Piantini	14 April 1992 (age 34)	1.78 m	8		(Chile) Real Santiago
22	CB	Maura Alvarez	13 November 1996 (age 29)	1.73 m	8		(Chile) Saint Rose
28	LW	Belén Castañeda	15 July 1996 (age 30)	1.60 m	8		(Chile) Saint Rose
31	LB	María Correa	20 October 1997 (age 28)	1.71 m	8		(Chile) BM Ovalle

Group B

Team	Pld	W	D	L	GF	GA	GD	Pts	Qualification
Argentina	3	2	0	1	75	60	+15	4	Qualified for the Semifinals
Uruguay	3	2	0	1	80	74	+6	4	Qualified for the Semifinals
Cuba	3	2	0	1	83	83	0	4	
Chile	3	0	0	3	69	90	−21	0	

July 16; 20:30	Chile	25–28	Cuba	Exhibition Centre – Hall B Referees: Guzman, Perez (PUR)
July 16; 20:30	Feuchtmann, Torres 5	(11–14)	Lusson 10	Exhibition Centre – Hall B Referees: Guzman, Perez (PUR)
July 16; 20:30	2× (yellow card) 5× (suspension)	report	1× (yellow card) 7× (suspension) 1× (red card)	Exhibition Centre – Hall B Referees: Guzman, Perez (PUR)

July 18; 20:30	Uruguay	32–26	Chile	Exhibition Centre – Hall B Referees: Ines Paolantoni, Florencia Zanikian (ARG)
July 18; 20:30	three players 5	(15–10)	Flores 5	Exhibition Centre – Hall B Referees: Ines Paolantoni, Florencia Zanikian (ARG)
July 18; 20:30	3× (yellow card) 4× (suspension)	Report	2× (yellow card) 7× (suspension)	Exhibition Centre – Hall B Referees: Ines Paolantoni, Florencia Zanikian (ARG)

July 20; 20:30	Argentina	30–18	Chile	Exhibition Centre – Hall B Referees: Zuñiga, Reyes (CUB)
July 20; 20:30	Mendoza 6	(15–10)	three players 3	Exhibition Centre – Hall B Referees: Zuñiga, Reyes (CUB)
July 20; 20:30	3× (yellow card) 1× (suspension)	report	4× (yellow card) 3× (suspension)	Exhibition Centre – Hall B Referees: Zuñiga, Reyes (CUB)

Classification round

July 22; 11:00	Puerto Rico	36–34	Chile	Exhibition Centre – Hall B Referees: Paoloantoni, Zanikian (ARG)
July 22; 11:00	Ceballos 11	(21–18)	Feuchtmann 6	Exhibition Centre – Hall B Referees: Paoloantoni, Zanikian (ARG)
July 22; 11:00	2× (yellow card)	report	2× (yellow card) 3× (suspension)	Exhibition Centre – Hall B Referees: Paoloantoni, Zanikian (ARG)

Seventh place match

July 24; 10:30	Chile	20–27	Canada	Exhibition Centre – Hall B Referees: Paolantoni, Zanikian (ARG)
July 24; 10:30	Miño 5	(10–14)	Lochet, Laplante 4	Exhibition Centre – Hall B Referees: Paolantoni, Zanikian (ARG)
July 24; 10:30	3× (yellow card) 3× (suspension)	report	2× (yellow card) 3× (suspension)	Exhibition Centre – Hall B Referees: Paolantoni, Zanikian (ARG)

== Judo ==
Chile has qualified a team of four judokas (two men and two women).

Men

Athlete	Event	Round of 16	Quarterfinals	Semifinals	Repechage	Final / BM	
Athlete	Event	Opposition Result	Opposition Result	Opposition Result	Opposition Result	Opposition Result	Rank
Rodrigo Idro	−81 kg	Burt (CAN); L 000 - 100	Did not advance		Did not advance		
Rafael Romo	−90 kg	Burt (CAN); W 001 - 000	Camilo (BRA); L 000 - 100	Did not advance	Romero (URU); W 010 - 000	Cárdenas (MEX); L 000 - 110	5°

Women

Athlete	Event	Round of 16	Quarterfinals	Semifinals	Repechage	Final / BM	
Athlete	Event	Opposition Result	Opposition Result	Opposition Result	Opposition Result	Opposition Result	Rank
Judith Gonzalez	−48 kg	Bye	Carrillo (MEX); L 000 - 012	Did not advance	Cobos (ECU); L 000 - 101	Did not advance	7°
Jacqueline Usnayo	−78 kg	Bonilla (COL); W 100 - 000	Castillo (CUB); L 000 - 011	Did not advance	Cárdenas (MEX); W 000 - 000	Roberge (CAN); L 000 - 001	5°

== Karate ==
Chile qualified 8 athletes.

Men

Athlete	Event	Round Robin				Semifinals	Final	
Athlete	Event	Opposition Result	Opposition Result	Opposition Result	Rank	Opposition Result	Opposition Result	Rank
Miguel Soffia	–60 kg	Rendón (COL); L 1–2	Brose (BRA); L 0–3	Larrosa (URU); W 3–0	3	Did not advance		
Israel Santana	–67 kg	Chung (CAN); D 1–1	Pinzas (ARG); L 0–5	Noriega (CUB); L 2–6	3	Did not advance		
David Dubó	–75 kg	Espinosa (ECU); D 0–0	Scott (USA); W 2–0	Icasati (ARG); L 0–1	3	Did not advance		
Jorge Acevedo	–84 kg	Sinani (CAN); L 0–8	Herrera (VEN); L 1–3	Merino (ESA); L 1–3	4	Did not advance		

Women

Athlete	Event	Round Robin				Semifinals	Final	
Athlete	Event	Opposition Result	Opposition Result	Opposition Result	Rank	Opposition Result	Opposition Result	Rank
Gabriela Bruna	–50 kg	Wolfe (USA); W 1–0	Souza (BRA); L 1–2	Cuellar (MEX); W 1–0	2	Virk (CAN); W 1–1 (Hantei)	Villanueva (DOM); L 0–5	2nd place, silver medalist(s)
Jessy Reyes	–55 kg	Urango (COL); W 8–0 (Kiken)	Vindrola (PER); W 3–2	Robinson (USA); L 1–2	1	Kumizaki (BRA); L 0–7	Did not advance	3rd place, bronze medalist(s)
Daniela Lepin	–61 kg	Brito (COL); W 8–0	Orbon (USA); L 3–5	Arreola (MEX); D 0–0	2	Grande (PER); L 1–5	Did not advance	3rd place, bronze medalist(s)
Lorena Salamanca	–68 kg	Landry (CAN); L 0–1	Molina (VEN); L 0–2	Caballero (MEX); L 0–1	4	Did not advance		

== Modern pentathlon ==
Chile qualified a team of 4 athletes (2 men and 2 women).

Men

Athlete	Event	Fencing (épée one touch)			Swimming (200m freestyle)			Riding (show jumping)			Shooting/running (10 m air pistol/3000m)			Total points	Final rank
Athlete	Event	Results	Rank	MP points	Time	Rank	MP points	Penalties	Rank	MP points	Time	Rank	MP points	Total points	Final rank
Esteban Bustos	Men's	17–11	=7	228	2:07.70	14	317	28	=13	272	11:55.46	2	585	1402	6
Martín Gajardo	Men's	7–21	27	147	2:07.44	12	318	Eliminated		0	13:50.15	19	470	935	26

Women

Athlete	Event	Fencing (épée one touch)			Swimming (200m freestyle)			Riding (show jumping)			Shooting/Running (10 m air pistol/3000m)			Total points	Final rank
Athlete	Event	Results	Rank	MP points	Time	Rank	MP points	Penalties	Rank	MP points	Time	Rank	MP points	Total points	Final rank
Loreto Gajardo	Women's	6–15	21	162	2:19.74	9	281	3	3	297	15:06.80	16	394	1134	17
Javiera Rosas	Women's	12–9	12	217	2:16.46	3	291	21	12	279	14:30.43	14	430	1217	12

== Racquetball ==
Chile qualified a team of two women.

Singles and doubles

Athlete(s)	Event	Qualifying round robin				Round of 32	Round of 16	Quarterfinals	Semifinals	Final	Rank
Athlete(s)	Event	Match 1	Match 2	Match 3	Rank	Opposition Result	Opposition Result	Opposition Result	Opposition Result	Opposition Result	Rank
Angela Grisar	Women's singles	Lambert (CAN); L 1–2	Vargas (ARG); L RET–2	Muñoz (ECU); L (WO)	4	Ana Martínez (GUA); L (WO)	Did not advance				
Carla Muñoz	Women's singles	Loma (BOL); L 1–2	Guillemette (ARG); W (WO)	Rajsich (USA); L 0–2	3	Gómez (COL); W 2–0	Samantha Salas (MEX); L (WO)	Did not advance			
Angela Grisar; Carla Muñoz	Women's doubles	Sotomayor / Muñoz (ECU); L 0–2	Longoria / Salas (MEX); L 0–2	—N/a	3	—N/a	Morissette / Richardson (CAN); W 2–0	Rajsich / Russell (USA); L 1–2	Did not advance		

Team

Athletes	Event	First round	Quarterfinals	Semifinals	Final	
Athletes	Event	Opposition Result	Opposition Result	Opposition Result	Opposition Result	Rank
Angela Grisar; Carla Muñoz	Women's team	Venezuela; W 2–0	Mexico; L 0–2	Did not advance		=5

== Roller sports ==
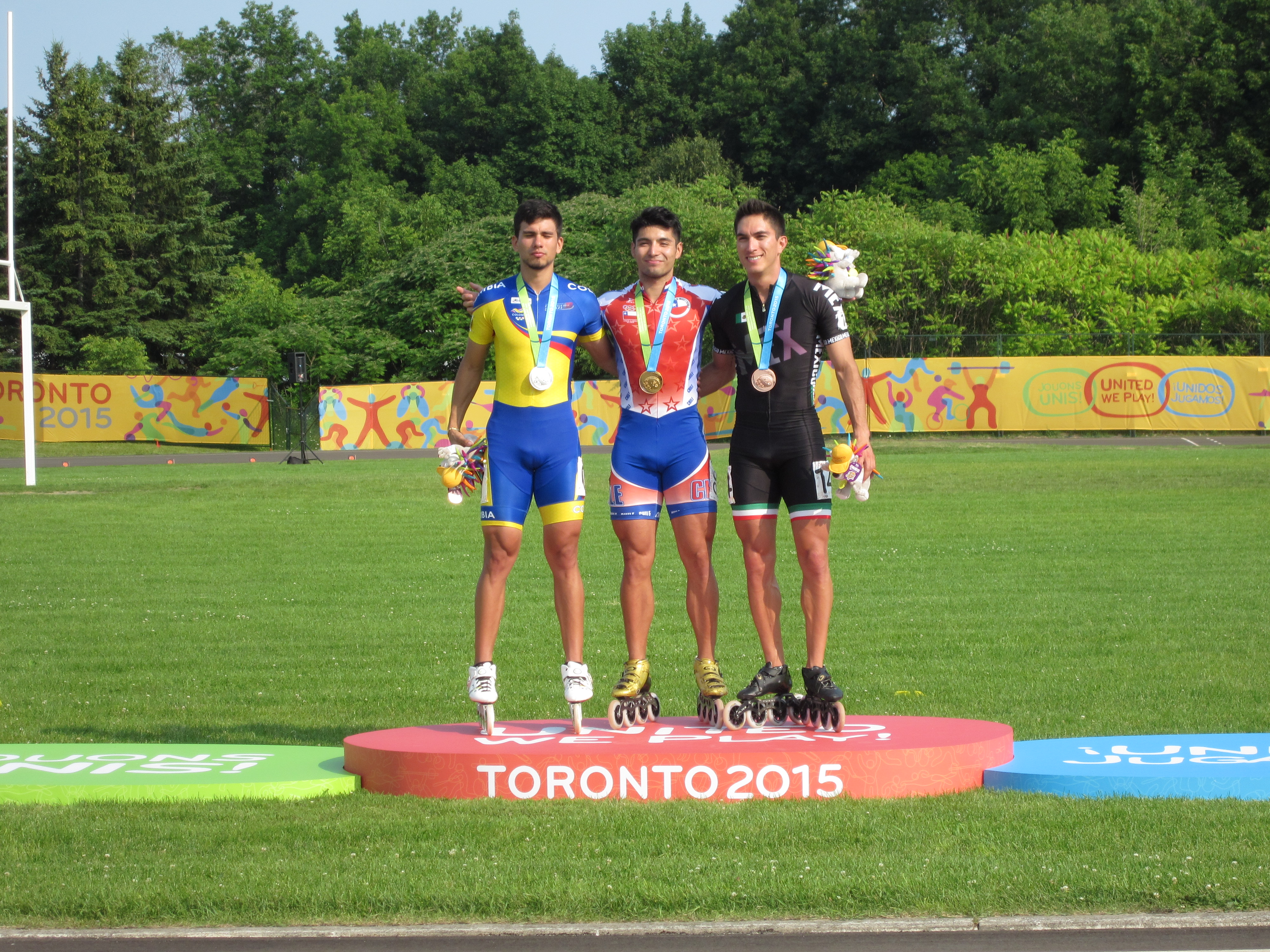
Emanuelle Silva on the podium after receiving his gold medal for winning the 200 m time trial event.

Chile qualified a full team of six athletes (three men and three women).

=== Figure ===
Chile qualified one skater in each event.

Athlete	Event	Short program		Free program		Final	
Athlete	Event	Points	Rank	Points	Rank	Points	Rank
Jose Luis Díaz	Men's free skating	116.20	6 Q	DNF		116.20	8
Marisol Villarroel	Women's free skating	116.10	3 Q	121.20	3	479.70	3rd place, bronze medalist(s)

=== Speed ===
Chile qualified two men and two women.

Athlete	Event	Semifinal		Final	
Athlete	Event	Time	Rank	Time/points	Rank
Emanuelle Silva	Men's 200 m time trial	—N/a		16.138	1st place, gold medalist(s)
Emanuelle Silva	Men's 500 m	39.045	3	Did not advance	
Rolando Ossandon	Men's 10,000 m points race	—N/a		3	8
María José Moya	Women's 200 m time trial	—N/a		18.042	3rd place, bronze medalist(s)
María José Moya	Women's 500 m	42.748	3	Did not advance	
Valeria Riffo	Women's 10,000 m points race	—N/a		6	4

== Rowing ==
Chile qualified 9 boats.

Men

Athlete	Event	Heats		Repechage		Final	
Athlete	Event	Time	Rank	Time	Rank	Time	Rank
Felipe Cárdenas	Single sculls	7:50.76	6 R	8:19.48	5 FB	DNS	
Ignacio Abraham; Luis Saumann Salas	Double sculls	7:14.55	5 R	7:34.27	5 FB	7:09.64	11
Andrés Oyarzún; Bernardo Guerrero	Lwt double sculls	6:48.14	2 FA	Bye		6:29.52	4
Félipe Leal; Óscar Vasquez	Coxless pair	6:36.21	1 F	Bye		6:27.77	1st place, gold medalist(s)
Felipe Cárdenas; Bernardo Guerrero; Andrés Oyarzún; Luis Saumann Salas	Lwt coxless four	6:44.22	3 R	6:41.74	3 F	6:47.89	3rd place, bronze medalist(s)

Women

Athlete	Event	Heats		Repechage		Final	
Athlete	Event	Time	Rank	Time	Rank	Time	Rank
Soraya Jadue	Single sculls	8:01.61	2 R	8:37.60	1 FA	7:43.34	3rd place, bronze medalist(s)
Soraya Jadue; Josefa Vila	Double sculls	7:33.70	5 F	—N/a		7:31.75	5
Antonia Abraham; Melita Abraham; Soraya Jadue; Josefa Vila	Quadruple sculls	6:54.96	5 F	—N/a		7:31.30	5
Antonia Abraham; Melita Abraham	Coxless pair	7:36.36	3 F	—N/a		7:32.77	2nd place, silver medalist(s)

Qualification Legend: FA=Final A (medal); FB=Final B (non-medal); R=Repechage

== Rugby sevens ==
Chile has qualified a men's team for a total of 12 athletes.

=== Men's tournament ===
Group A

Team	Pld	W	D	L	PF	PA	PD	Pts	Qualification
United States	3	3	0	0	126	7	+119	9	Qualified for the quarterfinals
Uruguay	3	2	0	1	54	69	−15	7	Qualified for the quarterfinals
Chile	3	1	0	2	62	46	+16	5	Qualified for the quarterfinals
Mexico	3	0	0	3	0	120	−120	3	Qualified for the quarterfinals

11 July 2015
11:11

United States	26–7	Chile
	Report

Exhibition Stadium, Toronto

11 July 2015
16:27

Uruguay	20–17	Chile
	Report

Exhibition Stadium, Toronto

11 July 2015
18:49

Chile	38–0	Mexico
	Report

Exhibition Stadium, Toronto

== Sailing ==
Chile qualified seven boats and 14 sailors.

Men

Athlete	Event	Race													Net points	Final rank
Athlete	Event	1	2	3	4	5	6	7	8	9	10	11	12	M*	Net points	Final rank
Matías del Solar	Laser	4	(17) OCS	17 DSQ	5	17 RET	15	11	4	6	6	5	14	—N/a	104	10

Women

Athlete	Event	Race																	Net points	Final rank
Athlete	Event	1	2	3	4	5	6	7	8	9	10	11	12	13	14	15	16	M*	Net points	Final rank
Maria Poncell	Laser Radial	13	9	13	11	13	(15)	13	10	13	11	8	15	—N/a				—N/a	129	14
Arantza Gumucio; Begoña Gumucio	49erFX	3	4	(6)	2	5	5	4	4	6	2	6	4	5	4	6	6	2	68	5

Open

Athlete	Event	Race													Net points	Final rank
Athlete	Event	1	2	3	4	5	6	7	8	9	10	11	12	M*	Net points	Final rank
Andres Ducasse	Sunfish	6	3	1	1	1	7	7	7	3	(8)	1	8	4	49	3rd place, bronze medalist(s)
Antonio Poncell; Pedro Vera	Snipe	(10)	7	7	10	4	2	10	8	9	6	8	10	—N/a	81	9
Tito González; Trinidad González; Cristian Herman	Lightning	(5)	4	4	4	1	1	2	5	5	1	5	4	8	44	4
Matías Seguel; Cristobal Lira; Marc Jux; Sergio Baeza Roth	J/24	5	4	3	4	5	(6)	4	3	1	2	1	2	10	44	3rd place, bronze medalist(s)

== Shooting ==
Chile qualified ten shooters.

Men

Athlete	Event	Qualification		Semifinal		Final / BM	
Athlete	Event	Score	Rank	Score	Rank	Opposition / Score	Rank
Anyelo Parada	10 m air rifle	612.3	7 Q	—N/a		118.5	6
Elías San Martín	10 m air rifle	601.0	20	—N/a		Did not advance	
Manuel Sánchez	50 m pistol	520-05x	21	—N/a		Did not advance	
Anyelo Parada	50 m rifle 3 positions	1108-25x	20	—N/a		Did not advance	
Elías San Martín	50 m rifle 3 positions	1141-30x	11	—N/a		Did not advance	
Claudio Vergara	Trap	99	18	Did not advance			
Manuel Sánchez	10 m pistol	568-17x	8Q	—N/a		133.4	5
Jorge Atalah	Skeet	115	18	Did not advance			
Piero Olivari	Skeet	118	9	Did not advance			

Women

Event	Athlete	Qualification		Semifinal		Final / BM	
Event	Athlete	Score	Rank	Score	Rank	Opposition / Score	Rank
Gabriela Lobos	10 m air rifle	398.2	25	—N/a		Did not advance	
Karina Vera	10 m air rifle	400.7	22	—N/a		Did not advance	
Pamela Salman	Trap	54	7	Did not advance			
Francisca Crovetto	Skeet	63	4 Q	12	4 QB	Borda (PER); W 15–12	3rd place, bronze medalist(s)

Qualification Legend: QG=Gold medal match; QB=Bronze medal match

== Synchronized swimming ==
Chile has qualified a duet team of two athletes.

Athlete	Event	Technical routine		Free routine (final)			
Athlete	Event	Points	Rank	Points	Rank	Total points	Rank
Kelley Kobler; Natalie Lubascher	Women's duet	73.4707	9	74.8000	9	148.2707	9

== Table tennis ==
Chile has qualified a full team of 3 male and 3 female athletes

Men
Individual

Athlete	Event	Round Robin			Round of 32	Round of 16	Quarterfinals	Semifinals	Final
Athlete	Event	Match 1	Match 2	Match 3	Round of 32	Round of 16	Quarterfinals	Semifinals	Final
Athlete	Event	Opposition Result	Opposition Result	Opposition Result	Opposition Result	Opposition Result	Opposition Result	Opposition Result	Opposition Result
Gustavo Gómez	Singles	Pereira (CUB); L 0–4	Gálvez (DOM); W 4–3	Thériault (CAN); L 0–4	Did not advance				
Manuel Moya	Singles	Monteiro (BRA); L 0–4	Chávez (PER); W 4–2	Gilabert (ARG); L 0–4	Did not advance				
Felipe Olivares	Singles	Vila (DOM); W 4–0	Calderano (BRA); L 0–4	Butler (USA); W 4–0 (Walkover)	Bye	Madrid (MEX); W 4–2	Monteiro (BRA); L 3–4	Did not advance	

Team

Athletes	Event	Preliminaries Group stage		Quarterfinal	Semifinal	Final
Athletes	Event	Opposition Result	Opposition Result	Opposition Result	Opposition Result	Opposition Result
Gustavo Gómez; Manuel Moya; Felipe Olivares	Team	Cuba (CUB); L 2–3	Paraguay (PAR); W 3–2	Brazil (BRA); L 0–3	Did not advance	

Women
Individual

Athlete	Event	Round Robin			Round of 32	Round of 16	Quarterfinals	Semifinals	Final
Athlete	Event	Match 1	Match 2	Match 3	Round of 32	Round of 16	Quarterfinals	Semifinals	Final
Athlete	Event	Opposition Result	Opposition Result	Opposition Result	Opposition Result	Opposition Result	Opposition Result	Opposition Result	Opposition Result
Natalia Castellano	Singles	Zhang (CAN); L 1–4	Montufar (GUA); W 4–2	Jiménez (CUB); W 4–3	Silva (MEX); W 4–3	Zhang (USA); L 0–4	Did not advance		
Katherine Low	Singles	Zhang (USA); L 0–4	Gálvez (ECU); L 2–4	Díaz (PUR); L 2–4	Did not advance				
Paulina Vega	Singles	Madrid (MEX); W 4–1	Silva (BRA); L 1–4	Lovet (CUB); L 3–4	Did not advance				

Team

Athletes	Event	Preliminaries Group stage		Quarterfinal	Semifinal	Final
Athletes	Event	Opposition Result	Opposition Result	Opposition Result	Opposition Result	Opposition Result
Natalia Castellano; Katherine Low; Paulina Vega	Team	Puerto Rico (PUR); L 2–3	Mexico (MEX); W 3–2	Canada (CAN); L 1–3	Did not advance	

== Taekwondo ==
Chile has qualified a team of 5 athletes (3 men´s and 2 women´s).

Men

Athlete	Event	Round of 16	Quarterfinals	Semifinals	Final
Athlete	Event	Opposition Result	Opposition Result	Opposition Result	Opposition Result
Ignacio Morales	Featherweight (-68kg)	Colon III (PUR); L 5–17	Did not advance		
Elías Robles	Welterweight (-80kg)	Barbosa (PUR); W 2–1	López (USA); L 3–4	Did not advance	
Leonardo Zamora	Heavyweight (+80kg)	Sio (ARG); L 5–8	Did not advance		

Women

Athlete	Event	Round of 16	Quarterfinals	Semifinals	Final
Athlete	Event	Opposition Result	Opposition Result	Opposition Result	Opposition Result
María Jara	Featherweight (-57kg)	Costa (PER); W 7–4	Gonda (CAN); L 4–16	Did not advance	
Patricia Figueroa	Welterweight (-67kg)	Villalon (CUB); L 0–12	Did not advance		

== Tennis ==
Chile nominated 5 tennis players (2 men and 3 women) to compete in the tournament.

Men

Athlete	Event	Round of 64	Round of 32	Round of 16	Quarterfinals	Semifinals	Final / BM	
Athlete	Event	Opposition Score	Opposition Score	Opposition Score	Opposition Score	Opposition Score	Opposition Score	Rank
Nicolás Jarry	Singles	BYE	Menezes (BRA); L 7–5, 3–6, 4–6	Did not advance				
Hans Podlipnik	Singles	BYE	Lewis (BAR); W 6–1, 6–1	Cid (DOM); W 6–3, 5–7, 6–3	Barrientos (COL); L 5–7, 2–6	Did not advance		
Nicolás Jarry; Hans Podlipnik	Doubles	—N/a		Bester / Schnur (CAN); W 6–4, 6–4	Aubone / Novikov (USA); W 5–7, 6–3, [10–3]	Escobar / Gómez (ECU); W 6–4, 6–4	Andreozzi / Bagnis (ARG); W 6–4, 7–6^{(7–5)}	1st place, gold medalist(s)

Women

Athlete	Event	Round of 32	Round of 16	Quarterfinals	Semifinals	Final / BM	
Athlete	Event	Opposition Score	Opposition Score	Opposition Score	Opposition Score	Opposition Score	Rank
Fernanda Brito	Singles	Haddad Maia (BRA); W 6–1, 6–0	Gámiz (VEN); L 4–6, 5–7	Did not advance			
Andrea Köch	Singles	Zacarías (MEX); L 4–6, 0–6	Did not advance				
Daniela Seguel	Singles	Gonçalves (BRA); L 6–2, 3–6, 6–7^{(4–7)}	Did not advance				
Fernanda Brito; Daniela Seguel	Doubles	—N/a		Rodríguez / Zacarías (MEX); L 4–6, 3–6	Did not advance		

Mixed

Athlete	Event	Round of 16	Quarterfinals	Semifinals	Final / BM	
Athlete	Event	Opposition Score	Opposition Score	Opposition Score	Opposition Score	Rank
Andrea Köch; Hans Podlipnik	Doubles	Römer / Lapentti (ECU); W 2–6, 7–5, [10–7]	Dabrowski / Bester (CAN); L 2–6, 2–6	Did not advance		

== Triathlon ==
Athlete	Event	Swim (1.5 km)	Trans 1	Bike (40 km)	Trans 2	Run (10 km)	Total time	Rank
Felipe Barraza	Men's	18:56	0:23	58:19	0:19	32:17	1:50:15	14
Gaspar Riveros	Men's	Disqualified						
Felipe Van de Wyngard	Men's	19:15	0:23	Did not finish				
Valentina Carvallo	Women's	20:46	0:36	1:04:49	0:22	36:22	2:02:58	15
Favia Díaz	Women's	21:57	0:45	1:05:17	0:34	Did not finish		
Bárbara Riveros	Women's	20:09	0:38	1:00:48	0:21	35:20	1:57:18	1st place, gold medalist(s)

== Water Skiing ==
Chile qualified four water skiers (two men and two women).

Waterski

Athlete	Event	Preliminary	Rank	Final	Rank
Felipe Miranda	Men's jump	60.3	3 Q	59.9	3rd place, bronze medalist(s)
Felipe Miranda	Men's slalom	3.00/58/11.25	6 Q	5.00/58/11.25	5
Felipe Miranda	Men's tricks	8960	5 Q	8610	5
Rodrigo Miranda	Men's jump	62.6	2 Q	62.1	2nd place, silver medalist(s)
Rodrigo Miranda	Men's slalom	4.00/58/12.00	12	Did not advance	
Rodrigo Miranda	Men's tricks	7620	7 Q	7800	6
Valentina Gonzalez	Women's jump	36.4	5 Q	37.8	5
Valentina Gonzalez	Women's slalom	2.00/55/12.00	=5 Q	1.50/55/13.00	6
Valentina Gonzalez	Women's tricks	5330	6 Q	4350	5
Fernanda Naser	Women's jump	37.6	4 Q	39.2	3rd place, bronze medalist(s)
Fernanda Naser	Women's slalom	4.00/55/13.00	8	Did not advance	
Fernanda Naser	Women's tricks	4070	9	Did not advance	

Overall

Athlete	Event	Trick	Ov. Trick	Slalom	Ov. Slalom	Jump	Ov. Jump	Overall	Rank
Felipe Miranda	Men's overall	8950	863.9	5.00/58/11.25	1000.0	58.9	913.7	2777.6	1st place, gold medalist(s)
Rodrigo Miranda	Men's overall	8120	783.8	4.00/58/12.00	800.0	58.8	911.1	2494.9	4
Valentina Gonzalez	Women's overall	4930	589.0	1.50/55/13.00	565.2	36.5	650.0	1804.2	5
Fernanda Naser	Women's overall	4070	486.3	2.00/55/14.25	405.8	37.0	666.7	1558.8	6

== Weightlifting ==
Chile has qualified a team of 4 athletes (2 men and 2 women).

Athlete	Event	Snatch		Clean & jerk		Total	Rank
Athlete	Event	Result	Rank	Result	Rank	Total	Rank
Francisco Barrera	Men's –56 kg	103	5	130	5	233	5
Bastián López	Men's –77 kg	136	8	176	=7	312	8
Massiel Rojas	Women's –63 kg	85	4	112	=3	197	4
Fernanda Valdés	Women's –75 kg	100	=3	131	2	231	2nd place, silver medalist(s)

== Wrestling ==
Chile qualified three male wrestlers.

Men
Freestyle

Athlete	Event	Quarterfinals	Semifinals	Final	Bronze medal	Rank
Athlete	Event	Opposition Result	Opposition Result	Opposition Result	Opposition Result	Opposition Result
Eduardo Gajardo	Men's 74 kg	Sarco (VEN); L 0–10	Did not advance			7

Greco-Roman

Athlete	Event	Quarterfinals	Semifinals	Final	Bronze medal	Rank
Athlete	Event	Opposition Result	Opposition Result	Opposition Result	Opposition Result	Opposition Result
Cristobál Torres	Men's 59 kg	Chávez (BOL); W 8–0	Soto (MEX); L 0–8	Did not advance	Dylan Williams (CAN); W 3–0	3rd place, bronze medalist(s)
Andrés Ayub	Men's 130 kg	Thoms (CAN); W 10–2	Encarnación (DOM); W 3–3	López (CUB); L 0–8	—N/a	2nd place, silver medalist(s)

== See also ==
- Chile at the 2016 Summer Olympics
