= Water skiing at the 2015 Pan American Games – Men's tricks =

Men's tricks at the 2015 Pan American Games
- Venue: Ontario Place West Channel
- Dates: July 20 – July 23
- Competitors: 15 from 9 nations

Medalists
Gold medal	Adam Pickos	United States
Silver medal	Jaret Llewellyn	Canada
Bronze medal	Javier Julio	Argentina

The men's tricks competition of the Water skiing events at the 2015 Pan American Games in Toronto were held from July 20 to July 23 at the Ontario Place West Channel. The defending champion was Javier Julio of Argentina.

== Results ==
=== Preliminary round ===
Rank	Name	Country	Result	Notes
1	Adam Pickos	United States	10920	Q
2	Jaret Llewellyn	Canada	10360	Q
3	Jason McClintock	Canada	9380	Q
4	Jorge Renosto	Argentina	9360	Q
5	Felipe Miranda	Chile	8960	Q
6	Javier Julio	Argentina	8740	Q
7	Rodrigo Miranda	Chile	7620	Q
8	Sandro Ambrosi	Mexico	6410	Q
9	Carlos Lamadrid	Mexico	4960	
10	Mateo Botero	Colombia	4150	
11	Santiago Correa	Colombia	2670	
12	Martin Malarczuk	Argentina	2490	
13	Alvaro Lamadrid	Mexico	2400	
14	Mario Mustafa	Peru	1390	
15	Andrew Dunlap	Guatemala	0	

=== Final ===
Rank	Name	Country	Result	Notes
1st place, gold medalist(s)	Adam Pickos	United States	11110	
2nd place, silver medalist(s)	Jaret Llewellyn	Canada	10550	
3rd place, bronze medalist(s)	Javier Julio	Argentina	9450	
4	Jason McClintock	Canada	9440	
5	Felipe Miranda	Chile	8610	
6	Rodrigo Miranda	Chile	7800	
7	Sandro Ambrosi	Mexico	5590	
8	Jorge Renosto	Argentina	0	
