= Luis Alberto Olcese =

Peruvian sailor

Personal information
- Born: 19 October 1981 (age 44) Lima, Peru

Sport
- Sport: Sailing

Luis Alberto Olcese (born 19 October 1981) is a Peruvian sailor. He competed in the Laser event at the 2000 Summer Olympics.
