= Ana Villanueva =

Dominican karateka (born 1982)

Personal information
- Full name: Ana Josefa Villanueva Fabián
- Nationality: Dominican
- Born: 20 March 1982 (age 44) Cotuí, Dominican Republic
- Weight: 49 kg (108 lb)

Sport
- Country: Dominican Republic
- Sport: Karate
- Event: Under 50 kg
Medal record
Women's Karate
Representing the Dominican Republic
World Championships
Bronze medal – third place	2012 Paris	Under 50 kg
Pan American Games
Gold medal – first place	2011 Guadalajara	Under 50 kg
Gold medal – first place	2015 Toronto	Under 50 kg
Central American and Caribbean Games
Gold medal – first place	2006 Cartagena	Team Kumite
Silver medal – second place	2014 Veracruz	Under 50 kg
Bronze medal – third place	2010 Mayagüez	Under 50 kg
Bronze medal – third place	2010 Mayagüez	Team Kumite

Ana Josefa Villanueva Fabián (born March 20, 1982, in Cotuí) is a karateka from the Dominican Republic who won the gold medal at the 2011 and 2015 Pan American Games.

== Early age and personal life ==
Villanueva started practicing boxing and volleyball. She is a student of Accounting at Universidad Organización y Método and is a member of the Dominican Air Force; there she received the promotion to sergeant major in 2011.

Ana took the money she collected after the 2011 Pan American Games winning, to repay the mortgage loan over her family house. They used the mortgage to fund the liver cancer treatment for one of Villanueva's brothers. She received an apartment from the government in 2017.

== Career ==
Villanueva win the gold medal at the team kumite competition during the 2006 Central American and Caribbean Games, held in Colombia.

At the 2009 Central American and Caribbean Championship held in Santiago, Dominican Republic, Ana win the old medal at the Team Kumite category and the silver at the under 50 kg. The next year, she took the gold medal in under 50 kg and bronze in the open category medal at the 2010 Central American and Caribbean Championships

Ana took two bronze medals at the 2010 Central American and Caribbean Games, one in the under 50 kg, and the other at the team kumite competition.

=== 2011 ===
Villanueva won the gold medal in the kumite –50 at the Ibero-American Championship, held in Managua, Nicaragua. Three months later, at the 2011 Pan American Games, Ana win the under 50 kg gold medal, defeating the Chilean Gabriela Bruna in the final match. For this winning she collected a RD$500,000 (approx. US$13,017 in November 2011) award by the President of the Dominican Republic, Mr. Leonel Fernández.

=== 2012 ===
For her achievements during 2011, Ana was selected in February along with Dionicio Gustavo, Karate Athlete of the year. She was also one of the 10 nominees for the Dominican Republic Athlete of the Year, finally won by Luguelín Santos.

In March 2012, her hometown mayor awarded Ana for making them proud for her achievements.

=== 2013 ===
Villanueva won the silver medal of the IV Iberoamerican Championship after losing to Venezuelan Aurimer Campos 3–4. The then won the bronze medal in kumite -50 kg and gold in team kumite.

=== 2021 ===
In 2021, she competed at the World Olympic Qualification Tournament held in Paris, France hoping to qualify for the 2020 Summer Olympics in Tokyo, Japan. She was eliminated in her first match by Bakhriniso Babaeva of Uzbekistan.
