= Andrés Ducasse =

Chilean sailor

Personal information
- Born: 24 June 1992 (age 34)

Sport
- Country: Chile
- Sport: Sailing

Andrés Ducasse (born 24 June 1992) is a Chilean competitive sailor. He competed at the 2016 Summer Olympics in Rio de Janeiro, in the men's 470 class.
