= Rowing at the 2015 Pan American Games =

- Rowing pictogram for the games
- Venue: Royal Canadian Henley Rowing Course
- Dates: July 11–15
- No. of events: 14 (8 men, 6 women)
- Competitors: 178 from 14 nations

Rowing competitions at the 2015 Pan American Games in Toronto will be held from July 11 to 15 at the Royal Canadian Henley Rowing Course in St. Catharines. A total of fourteen rowing events were contested at the Games. A total of fourteen rowing events were held: eight for men and six for women.

== Competition schedule ==
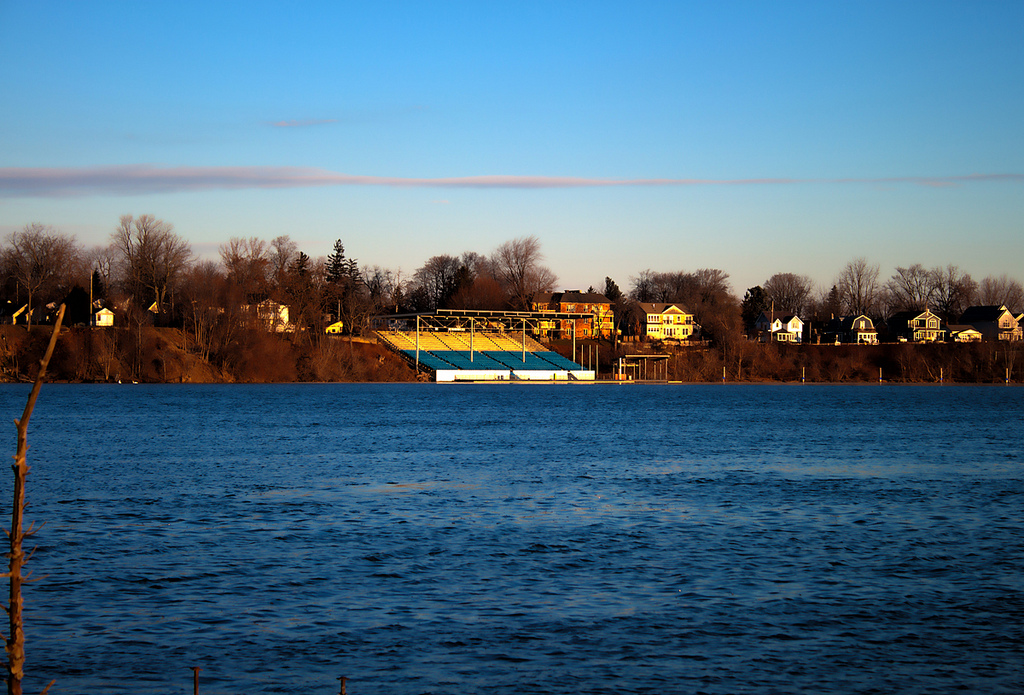
The Royal Canadian Henley Rowing Course, in St. Catharines, was the venue for the rowing competitions.

The following is the competition schedule for the rowing competitions:

| H | Heats | R | Repechage | F | Final |

| Event↓/Date → | Sat 11 | | Sun 12 | | Mon 13 | Tue 14 | Wed 15 |
|---|---|---|---|---|---|---|---|
| Men's single sculls | H | R | | | | | F |
| Men's double sculls | H | R | | | F | | |
| Men's lightweight double sculls | H | R | | | | F | |
| Men's quadruple sculls | | | H | | | F | |
| Men's coxless pair | | | H | R | | F | |
| Men's coxless four | H | R | | | F | | |
| Men's lightweight coxless four | | | H | R | | | F |
| Men's eight | | | H | | | | F |
| Women's single sculls | | | H | R | | F | |
| Women's lightweight single sculls | | | H | R | | | F |
| Women's double sculls | H | | | | F | | |
| Women's lightweight double sculls | H | R | | | | F | |
| Women's quadruple sculls | | | H | | | | F |
| Women's coxless pair | H | | | | F | | |

== Medal table ==
* Host nation (Canada)

| Rank | Nation | Gold | Silver | Bronze | Total |
|---|---|---|---|---|---|
| 1 | Canada* | 8 | 1 | 2 | 11 |
| 2 | United States | 2 | 5 | 2 | 9 |
| 3 | Cuba | 2 | 3 | 2 | 7 |
| 4 | Argentina | 1 | 2 | 5 | 8 |
| 5 | Chile | 1 | 1 | 2 | 4 |
| 6 | Mexico | 1 | 0 | 1 | 2 |
| 7 | Brazil | 0 | 1 | 0 | 1 |
| Totals (7 entries) | | 15 | 13 | 14 | 42 |

== Medalists ==
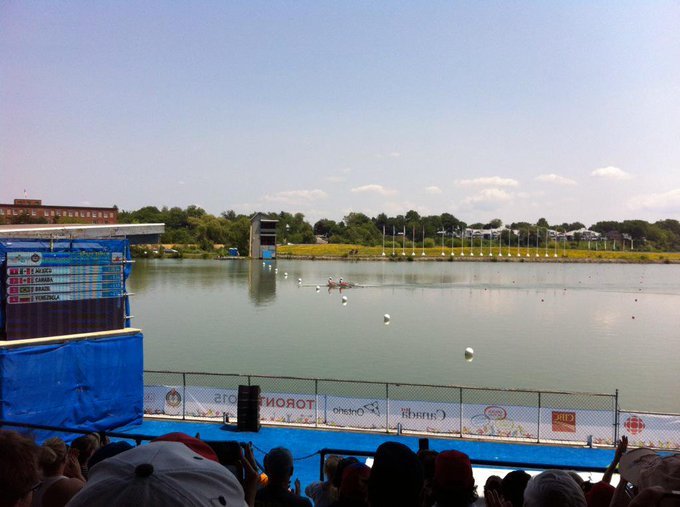
During the competition

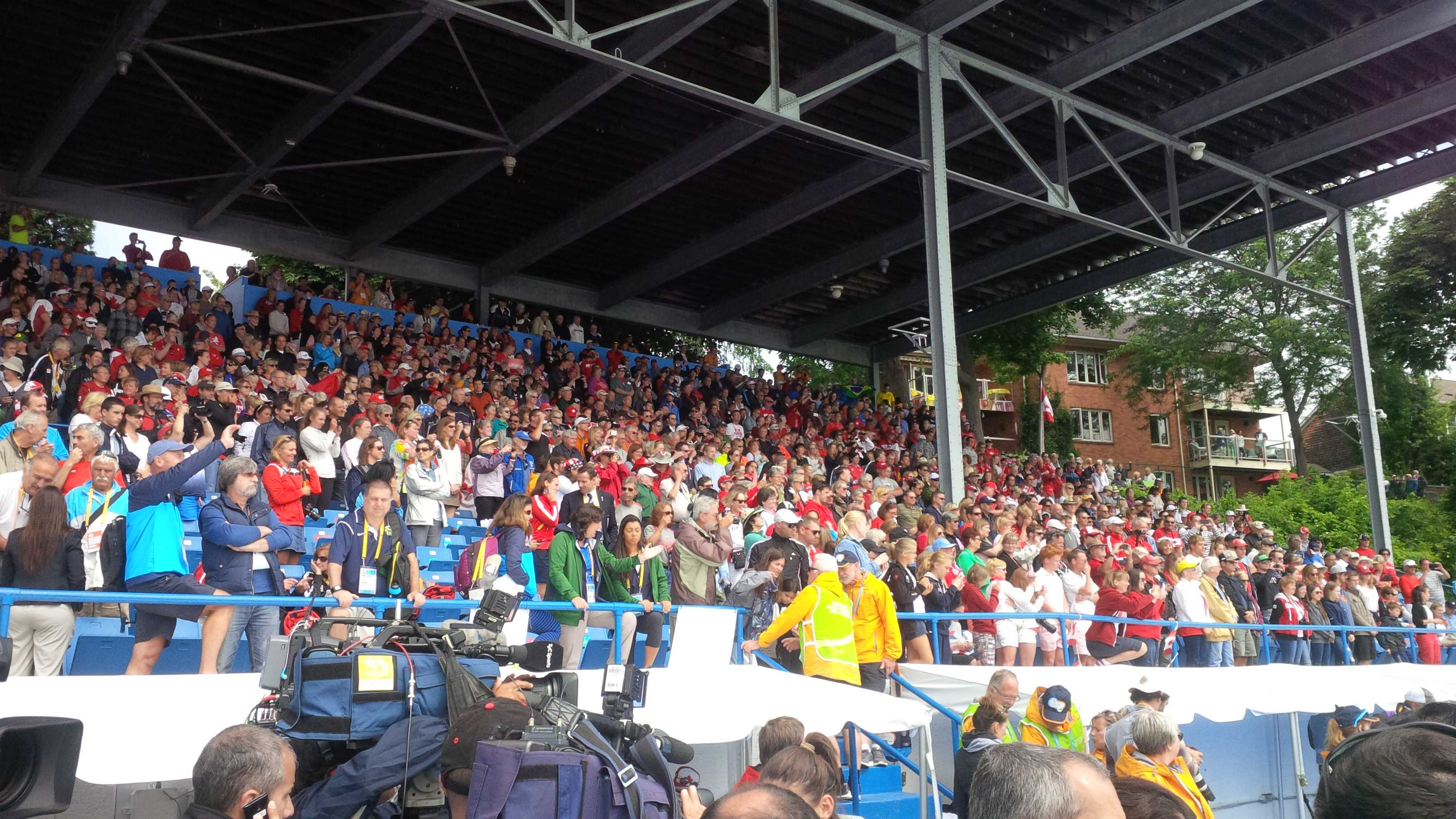
The crowd during the competition

=== Men's events ===
| Event | Gold | Silver | Bronze |
|---|---|---|---|
| Single sculls | Ángel Fournier; Cuba | Rob Gibson; Canada | Brian Rosso; Argentina |
| Double sculls | Cuba; Eduardo Rubio; Ángel Fournier | Argentina; Cristian Rosso; Rodrigo Murillo | Canada; Pascal Lussier; Matthew Buie |
| Lightweight double sculls | Mexico; Alan Armenta; Alexis López | United States; Colin Ethridge; Austin Meyer | Cuba; Raul Hernandez; Liosbel Hernandez |
| Quadruple sculls | Canada; Julien Bahain; Matthew Buie; Will Dean; Rob Gibson | Cuba; Adrián Oquendo; Orlando Sotolongo; Eduardo Rubio; Ángel Fournier | Argentina; Cristian Rosso; Osvaldo Suárez; Rodrigo Murillo; Brian Rosso |
| Coxless pair | Argentina; Axel Haack; Diego López; Chile; Félipe Leal; Oscar Vásquez | Not Awarded | Mexico; Diego Sánchez; Leopoldo Tejera |
| Coxless four | Canada; Will Crothers; Tim Schrijver; Kai Langerfeld; Conlin McCabe | Cuba; Manuel Suarez; Janier Concepción; Adrian Oquendo; Solaris Freire | Argentina; Joaquín Iwán; Francisco Esteras; Iván Carino; Agustín Diaz |
| Lightweight coxless four | Canada; Maxwell Lattimer; Brendan Hodge; Nicolas Pratt; Eric Woelfl | United States; Robin Prendes; Peter Gibson; Andrew Weiland; Matthew O'Donoghue | Chile; Andres Oyarzun; Luis Saumann Salas; Felipe Cardenas; Bernardo Guerrero |
| Coxed eight | Canada; Julien Bahain; Martin Barakso; Will Crothers; Will Dean; Mike Evans; Kai Langerfeld; Conlin McCabe; Tim Schrijver; Jacob Koudys (C) | Argentina; Joaquín Iwán; Axel Haack; Osvaldo Suárez; Francisco Esteras; Iván Carino; Rodrigo Murillo; Diego López; Agustín Díaz; Joel Infante (C) | United States; Matthew Mahon; Brendan Harrington; Taylor Brown; Erick Winstead; David Eick; Kyle Peabody; Nareg Guregian; Kean Johnson; Sam Ojserkis (C) |

=== Women's events ===
| Event | Gold | Silver | Bronze |
|---|---|---|---|
| Single sculls | Carling Zeeman; Canada | Katherine McFetridge; United States | Soraya Jadue; Chile |
| Lightweight single sculls | Mary Jones; United States | Fabiana Beltrame; Brazil | Lucia Palermo; Argentina |
| Double sculls | Canada; Kerry Maher-Shaffer; Antje von Seydlitz | United States; Nicole Ritchie; Lindsay Meyer | Cuba; Aimee Hernandez; Yariulvis Cobas |
| Lightweight double sculls | Canada; Liz Fenje; Katherine Sauks | Cuba; Yislena Hernandez; Licet Hernandez | United States; Sara Giancola; Victoria Burke |
| Quadruple sculls | Canada; Kate Goodfellow; Kerry Maher-Shaffer; Carling Zeeman; Antje von Seydlitz | United States; Sarah Giancola; Lindsay Meyer; Nicole Ritchie; Victoria Burke | Argentina; Karina Wilvers; Maria Laura Abalo; Milka Kraljev; Maria Rohner |
| Coxless pair | United States; Emily Huelskamp; Molly Bruggeman | Chile; Melita Abraham; Antonia Abraham | Canada; Rosie DeBoef; Kristin Bauder |

== Participating nations ==
A total of 14 countries have qualified athletes. The number of athletes a nation has entered is in parentheses beside the name of the country.

- Argentina (23)
- Brazil (21)
- Canada (26)
- Chile (11)
- Cuba (22)
- El Salvador (4)
- Guatemala (8)
- Mexico (15)
- Nicaragua (2)
- Paraguay (5)
- Peru (3)
- United States (26)
- Uruguay (5)
- Venezuela (7)

== Qualification ==
A total of 205 rowers qualified to compete at the games. A country may only enter a maximum of 26 rowers. All qualification was done at the 2014 Pan American Olympic Festival (except the men's eights which was by entry only), where a specific number of boats qualified in each of the fourteen events.

== See also ==
- Rowing at the 2016 Summer Olympics
