= Rowing at the 2015 Pan American Games – Men's eight =

Rowing – Men's eight at the 2015 Pan American Games
- Venue: Royal Canadian Henley Rowing Course
- Dates: July 12–15, 2015
- Competitors: 46 from 5 nations
- Winning time: 5:45.79

Medalists
Gold medal	Mike Evans; Will Dean; Julien Bahain; Martin Barakso; Tim Schrijver; Conlin McCabe; Kai Langerfeld; Will Crothers; Jacob Koudys	Canada
Silver medal	Joaquín Iwan; Axel Haack; Osvaldo Suárez; Francisco Esteras; Ivan Carino; Rodrigo Murillo; Diego López; Agustin Diaz; Joel Infante	Argentina
Bronze medal	Matthew Mahon; Brendan Harrington; Taylor Brown; Erick Winstead; David Eick; Kyle Peabody; Nareg Guregian; Keane Johnson; Sam Ojserkis	United States

The men's eight rowing event at the 2015 Pan American Games was held from July 12–15 at the Royal Canadian Henley Rowing Course in St. Catharines.

== Schedule ==
All times are Eastern Standard Time (UTC-3).

Date	Time	Round
July 12, 2015	11:00	Heat
July 15, 2015	10:35	Final

== Results ==
=== Heat ===
Rank	Rowers	Country	Time	Notes
1	Julien Bahain; Mike Evans; Martin Barakso; Tim Schrijver; Will Dean; Conlin McCabe; Kai Langerfeld; Will Crothers; Jacob Koudys (C)	Canada	5:45.79	F
2	Matthew Mahon; Brendan Harrington; Taylor Brown; Erick Winstead; David Eick; Kyle Peabody; Nareg Guregian; Keane Johnson; Sam Ojserkis (C)	United States	6:03.81	F
3	Diego Donizette Nazario; Emanuel Dantas Borges; Leandro Tozzo; Allan Scaravaglioni Bitencourt; Vinicios Delazeri; Maciel Costa Da Silva; Pedro Henrique Drummond Gondin; Victor Ruzicki Pereira; Mauricio De Abreu Carlos(C)	Brazil	6:21.17	F
4	Joaquín Iwan; Axel Haack; Osvaldo Suárez; Francisco Esteras; Ivan Carino; Rodrigo Murillo; Diego López; Agustin Diaz; Joel Infante (C)	Argentina	6:52.97	F
5	Eduardo González; Jose Rodriguez; Eduardo Rubio; Ángel Fournier; Manuel Suárez; Solaris Freire; Adrian Oquendo; Janier Concepción; Juan Carlos González (C)	Cuba	7:47.30	F

=== Final ===
Rank	Rowers	Country	Time	Notes
1st place, gold medalist(s)	Mike Evans; Will Dean; Julien Bahain; Martin Barakso; Tim Schrijver; Conlin McCabe; Kai Langerfeld; Will Crothers; Jacob Koudys (C)	Canada	6:07.01	
2nd place, silver medalist(s)	Joaquín Iwan; Axel Haack; Osvaldo Suárez; Francisco Esteras; Ivan Carino; Rodrigo Murillo; Diego López; Agustin Diaz; Joel Infante (C)	Argentina	6:10.08	
3rd place, bronze medalist(s)	Matthew Mahon; Brendan Harrington; Taylor Brown; Erick Winstead; David Eick; Kyle Peabody; Nareg Guregian; Keane Johnson; Sam Ojserkis (C)	United States	6:12.64	
4	Liosbel Hernandez; Jose Rodriguez; Eduardo Rubio; Ángel Fournier; Eduardo González; Solaris Freire; Adrian Oquendo; Janier Concepción; Juan Carlos González (C)	Cuba	6:14.00	
5	Diego Donizette Nazario; Emanuel Dantas Borges; Leandro Tozzo; Allan Scaravaglioni Bitencourt; Vinicios Delazeri; Maciel Costa Da Silva; Pedro Henrique Drummond Gondin; Victor Ruzicki Pereira; Mauricio De Abreu Carlos (C)	Brazil	6:34.10	
