= Cuba at the 2015 Pan American Games =

- IOC code: CUB
- NOC: Cuban Olympic Committee

in Toronto, Canada 10–26 July 2015
- Competitors: 213 in 30 sports
- Flag bearer (opening): Mijaín López
- Flag bearer (closing): Mijaín López
- Medals Ranked 4th: Gold 36 Silver 27 Bronze 34 Total 97

Pan American Games appearances (overview)
- 1951; 1955; 1959; 1963; 1967; 1971; 1975; 1979; 1983; 1987; 1991; 1995; 1999; 2003; 2007; 2011; 2015; 2019; 2023

Cuba competed at the 2015 Pan American Games in Toronto, Ontario, Canada, from July 10 to 26, 2015.

Greco-Roman wrestler Mijaín López was the flagbearer of the team during the opening ceremony. For first time since 1971, Cuba finished outside the top 2 places, struggling to the 4th position. This Cuba's participation made a breakpoint in Cuban sports, starting a period of decline in the successive games.

== Competitors ==
The following table lists Cuba's delegation per sport and gender.

Sport	Men	Women	Total
Archery	3	3	6
Athletics	27	31	58
Badminton	4	3	7
Baseball	24	18	42
Basketball	0	12	12
Beach volleyball	2	2	4
Boxing	10	0	10
Canoeing	9	6	15
Cycling	0	9	9
Diving	2	2	4
Fencing	5	9	14
Field hockey	16	16	32
Gymnastics	5	12	17
Handball	14	15	29
Judo	7	7	14
Modern pentathlon	2	2	4
Rowing	15	7	22
Sailing	2	1	3
Shooting	10	6	16
Softball	0	15	15
Swimming	3	1	4
Synchronized swimming	—N/a	9	9
Table tennis	3	3	6
Taekwondo	3	4	7
Tennis	2	0	2
Triathlon	1	3	4
Volleyball	12	12	24
Water polo	13	13	26
Weightlifting	7	1	8
Wrestling	12	6	18
Total	213	228	441

== Archery ==
Cuba qualified the maximum team of three men and three women, for a total of six athletes.

Men

Athlete	Event	Ranking Round		Round of 32	Round of 16	Quarterfinals	Semifinals	Final / BM	Rank
Athlete	Event	Score	Seed	Opposition Score	Opposition Score	Opposition Score	Opposition Score	Opposition Score	Rank
Hugo Franco	Individual	658	7	Pizarro (PUR); L 4–6	did not advance				
Adrián Puentes	Individual	651	12	Betancur (COL); L 3–7	did not advance				
Juan Carlos Stevens	Individual	652	11	Oliveira (BRA); W 6–5	Martínez (DOM); W 7–3	Ellison (USA); L 6–0	did not advance		
Hugo Franco; Adrián Puentes; Juan Carlos Stevens	Team	1961	3	—N/a		Colombia; W 5–4	Mexico; L 4–5	Brazil; L 3–5	4

Women

Athlete	Event	Ranking Round		Round of 32	Round of 16	Quarterfinals	Semifinals	Final / BM	Rank
Athlete	Event	Score	Seed	Opposition Score	Opposition Score	Opposition Score	Opposition Score	Opposition Score	Rank
Lorisglenis Ojea	Individual	581	25	Dos Santos (BRA); L 1–7	did not advance				
Elizabeth Rodríguez	Individual	597	19	Vrakking (CAN); L 5–6	did not advance				
Maydenia Sarduy	Individual	630	10	Maldonado (CHI); W 7–1	Brito (VEN); W 6–5	Román (MEX); L 3–7	did not advance		
Lorisglenis Ojea; Elizabeth Rodríguez; Maydenia Sarduy	Team	1808	7	—N/a	Bye	United States; L 3–5	did not advance		

== Badminton ==
Cuba qualified a team of six athletes (three men and three women). Cuba would later receive an additional men's quota.

== Baseball ==
Cuba qualified a men's baseball team, of 24 athletes. Cuba has also qualified a women's team of 18 athletes, for a total of 42 entered competitors.

=== Men's tournament ===
Cuba's men's baseball team for the 2015 Pan American Games is listed below. The position of the player is listed in parentheses.

- Roel Santos (OF)
- Raul Gonzalez (OF/IF)
- Rudy Reyes (OF/IF)
- Yosvany Alarcón (C)
- Freddy Álvarez (P)
- Urmaris Guerra (OF)
- Ismel Jiménez (P)
- Frederich Cepeda (IF)
- Yander Guevara (P)
- Jose Garcia (OF)
- Héctor Mendoza (P)
- Yorbis Borroto (IF)
- Yordan Manduley (IF)
- Frank Morejón (C)
- Erly Casanova (P)
- Alfredo Despaigne (OF)
- Alexander Malleta (IF)
- Yosbany Torres (P)
- Yoennis Yera (P)
- Yulexis La Rosa (C)
- William Saavedra (IF)
- Lazaro Blanco (P)
- Livan Moinelo (P)
- Yennier Canó (P)

Legend: C = Catcher, INF = Infielder, OF = Outfielder, P = Pitcher

Group A

Pos	Team	Pld	W	L	RF	RA	RD	PCT	GB	Qualification
1	Canada	6	5	1	38	15	+23	.833	—	Advance to the semifinals
2	United States	6	4	2	33	22	+11	.667 (Note: In the 3-way tie for 2nd place, all three teams went 1-1 head to head. The 2nd tiebreaker, Team Quality Balance, was used to identify and eliminate the last team in the group (Puerto Rico). The tie between the other two teams was then broken on the basis of the head-to-head result between them (United States defeating Cuba).)	1	Advance to the semifinals
3	Cuba	6	4	2	41	23	+18	.667	1	Advance to the semifinals
4	Puerto Rico	6	4	2	40	44	−4	.667	1	Advance to the semifinals
5	Dominican Republic	6	3	3	30	35	−5	.500	2	
6	Nicaragua	6	1	5	22	43	−21	.167	4	
7	Colombia	6	0	6	22	44	−22	.000	5	

Notes:

11 July 2015; 12:00	Colombia	3–10	Cuba	President’s Choice Ajax Pan Am Ballpark – Main Field, Ajax; Attendance: 1,600
11 July 2015; 12:00		Boxscore		President’s Choice Ajax Pan Am Ballpark – Main Field, Ajax; Attendance: 1,600

12 July 2015; 19:00	United States	5–2	Cuba	President’s Choice Ajax Pan Am Ballpark – Main Field, Ajax; Attendance: 4,209
12 July 2015; 19:00		Boxscore		President’s Choice Ajax Pan Am Ballpark – Main Field, Ajax; Attendance: 4,209

13 July 2015; 12:00	Cuba	8–1	Puerto Rico	President’s Choice Ajax Pan Am Ballpark – Main Field, Ajax; Attendance: 2,133
13 July 2015; 12:00		Boxscore		President’s Choice Ajax Pan Am Ballpark – Main Field, Ajax; Attendance: 2,133

14 July 2015; 19:00	Cuba	1–3	Canada	President’s Choice Ajax Pan Am Ballpark – Main Field, Ajax; Attendance: 4,638
14 July 2015; 19:00		Boxscore		President’s Choice Ajax Pan Am Ballpark – Main Field, Ajax; Attendance: 4,638

15 July 2015; 19:00	Cuba	9–5	Dominican Republic	President’s Choice Ajax Pan Am Ballpark – Main Field, Ajax; Attendance: 4,127
15 July 2015; 19:00		Boxscore		President’s Choice Ajax Pan Am Ballpark – Main Field, Ajax; Attendance: 4,127

16 July 2015; 15:30	Nicaragua	6–11	Cuba	President’s Choice Ajax Pan Am Ballpark – Second Field, Ajax; Attendance: 1,027
16 July 2015; 15:30		Boxscore		President’s Choice Ajax Pan Am Ballpark – Second Field, Ajax; Attendance: 1,027

Semifinal

18 July 2015; 13:00	United States	6–5	Cuba	President’s Choice Ajax Pan Am Ballpark – Main Field, Ajax; Attendance: 4,702
18 July 2015; 13:00		Boxscore		President’s Choice Ajax Pan Am Ballpark – Main Field, Ajax; Attendance: 4,702

Bronze medal match

19 July 2015; 13:00	(bronze) Cuba	7–6	Puerto Rico	President’s Choice Ajax Pan Am Ballpark – Main Field, Ajax; Attendance: 4,914
19 July 2015; 13:00		Boxscore		President’s Choice Ajax Pan Am Ballpark – Main Field, Ajax; Attendance: 4,914

=== Women's tournament ===
The Cuba women's national baseball team roster for the 2015 Pan American Games (as of 19 July 2015):

- Leydis Arzuaga (C)
- Yurismary Baez (OF)
- Yulisa Barban (OF)
- Dayanna Batista (IF)
- Vania Cabrera (IF)
- Ana Castellanos (P)
- Yoidania Castro (P)
- Enelsy Cordovi (P)
- Yanet Cruz (P)
- Libia Duarte (IF)
- Jessica Herrera (IF)
- Yadira Lopez (P)
- Dianelis Munoz (OF)
- Odrisleisis Peguero (OF)
- Nilsa Rodriguez (IF)
- Yordanka Rodriguez (C)
- Mayumis Solano (P)
- Mariandy Torres (OF)

Legend: C = Catcher, IF = Infielder, OF = Outfielder, P = Pitcher

Group A

Pos	Team	Pld	W	L	RF	RA	RD	PCT	GB	Qualification
1	United States	4	4	0	33	7	+26	1.000	—	Advanced to the Gold medal match
2	Canada	4	3	1	26	9	+17	.750	1	Advance to the Bronze medal match
3	Venezuela	4	2	2	32	30	+2	.500	2	Advance to the Bronze medal match
4	Puerto Rico	4	1	3	17	27	−10	.250	3	
5	Cuba	4	0	4	8	43	−35	.000	4	

20 July 2015; 19:00	Cuba	1–13	Canada	President’s Choice Ajax Pan Am Ballpark, Ajax; Attendance: 1,602
20 July 2015; 19:00		Boxscore		President’s Choice Ajax Pan Am Ballpark, Ajax; Attendance: 1,602

21 July 2015; 15:00	Cuba	5–6	Puerto Rico	President’s Choice Ajax Pan Am Ballpark, Ajax; Attendance: 975
21 July 2015; 15:00		Boxscore		President’s Choice Ajax Pan Am Ballpark, Ajax; Attendance: 975

22 July 2015; 19:00	United States	11–0	Cuba	President’s Choice Ajax Pan Am Ballpark, Ajax; Attendance: 773
22 July 2015; 19:00		Boxscore		President’s Choice Ajax Pan Am Ballpark, Ajax; Attendance: 773

23 July 2015; 15:00	Cuba	2–13	Venezuela	President’s Choice Ajax Pan Am Ballpark, Ajax; Attendance: 977
23 July 2015; 15:00		Boxscore		President’s Choice Ajax Pan Am Ballpark, Ajax; Attendance: 977

== Basketball ==
Cuba qualified a women's team of 12 athletes.

=== Women's tournament ===
Roster

The Cuba women's national basketball team roster for the 2015 Pan American Games.

Cuba women's national basketball team – 2015 Pan American Games roster
Players
Coaches

Pos.	No.	Name	Age – Date of birth	Height	Club
F	4	Ochoa, Fransy	24 – 13 Sep 1990	1.84 m (6 ft 0 in)	(Cuba) Villa Clara
G	5	Casanova, Ineidis	26 – 13 Oct 1988	1.68 m (5 ft 6 in)	Santiago de Cuba
F	6	Galindo, Anisleidy	26 – 29 Jan 1989	1.80 m (5 ft 11 in)	(Cuba) Pinar del Rio
G	7	Gelis, Oyanaisy	31 – 21 Oct 1983	1.72 m (5 ft 8 in)	(Cuba) Habana
G	8	Romero, Arlenys	31 – 7 Feb 1984	1.76 m (5 ft 9 in)	(Cuba) Pinar del Rio
F	9	Amargo, Yamara	30 – 28 Jun 1985	1.77 m (5 ft 10 in)	(Cuba) Sancti Spiritus
F	10	Povea, Arlety	30 – 7 Oct 1984	1.86 m (6 ft 1 in)	(Cuba) Pinar del Rio
C	11	Cepeda, Marlene	29 – 27 Oct 1985	1.85 m (6 ft 1 in)	Santiago de Cuba
F	12	Noblet, Clenia	28 – 6 May 1987	1.84 m (6 ft 0 in)	(Cuba) Guantanamo
C	13	Aties, Zuleira	34 – 9 Oct 1980	1.91 m (6 ft 3 in)	(Cuba) Habana
F	14	Oquendo, Leidys	32 – 23 Jul 1982	1.77 m (5 ft 10 in)	(Cuba) Camaguey
F	15	Avila, Suchitel	32 – 1 Sep 1982	1.83 m (6 ft 0 in)	(Cuba) Habana

Head coach

- Zabala, Alberto

Assistant coach(es)

- Moya, Eduardo

Legend

- Age – as of 15 July 2015
- Club – before start of Games

Group B

Team	Pld	W	L	PF	PA	PD	Pts	Qualification
Canada	3	3	0	245	164	+81	6	Qualified for the semifinals
Cuba	3	2	1	209	188	+21	5	Qualified for the semifinals
Argentina	3	1	2	200	209	−9	4	
Venezuela	3	0	3	168	261	−93	3	

16 July 2015
10:30

Report

Cuba	68–55	Argentina
Scoring by quarter: 23–12, 13–14, 14–17, 18–12
Pts: Amargo 17; Rebs: Noblet 9 Asts: Amargo 3		Pts: González 15; Rebs: Vega 7 Asts: Boquete 6

Ryerson Athletic Centre, Toronto

17 July 2015
10:30

Report

Venezuela	62–73	Cuba
Scoring by quarter: 18–21, 16–13, 11–20, 17–19
Pts: Silva Serrano 22; Rebs: Blanco Piñango, Perez Abreu 9 Asts: Wallen Morillo 2		Pts: Amargo 18; Rebs: Oquendo 12; Asts: Casanova 8

Ryerson Athletic Centre, Toronto

18 July 2015
18:00

Report

Canada	71–68	Cuba
Scoring by quarter: 20–18, 20–17, 20–13, 11–20
Pts: Achonwa 15; Rebs: Achonwa 7 Asts: Langlois, Tatham 4		Pts: Gelis 18; Rebs: Noblet 9 Asts: Casanova, Gelis 3

Ryerson Athletic Centre, Toronto

Semifinals

19 July 2015
13:30

Report

Cuba	64–65	United States
Scoring by quarter: 17–18, 20–8, 11–20, 16–19
Pts: Casanova, Noblet 15; Rebs: Ochoa, Noblet 10; Asts: Gelis 3		Pts: Harper 16; Rebs: Coates 15; Asts: Jefferson 5

Ryerson Athletic Centre, Toronto

Bronze medal match

20 July 2015
16:00

Report

(bronze) Cuba	66–62	Brazil
Scoring by quarter: 14–16, 23–16, 12–16, 17–14
Pts: Casanova 18; Rebs: Noblet 14; Asts: Casanova 4		Pts: Paixão 16; Rebs: Santos 7 Asts: Paixão 4

Ryerson Athletic Centre, Toronto

== Beach volleyball ==
Cuba qualified a men's and women's pair for a total of four athletes.

Athlete	Event	Preliminary round			Quarterfinals	Semifinals	Finals	
Athlete	Event	Opposition Score	Opposition Score	Opposition Score	Opposition Score	Opposition Score	Opposition Score	Rank
	Men's							
	Women's							

== Canoeing ==
=== Sprint ===
Cuba qualified 11 athletes in the sprint discipline (5 in men's kayak and 5 in women's kayak, 4 in men's canoe and 1 in women's canoe).

Men

Athlete	Event	Heats		Semifinals		Final	
Athlete	Event	Time	Rank	Time	Rank	Time	Rank
Fidel Vargas	K-1 200 m	36.401	2 QF	Bye		37.103	5
Reinier Torres; Fidel Vargas	K-2 200 m	—N/a				34.139	2nd place, silver medalist(s)
Jorge García	K-1 1000 m	—N/a				3:40.990	1st place, gold medalist(s)
Jorge García; Reinier Torres	K-2 1000 m	—N/a				3:25.932	1st place, gold medalist(s)
Jorge García; Alex Menendez; Renier Mora; Reinier Torres	K-4 1000 m	—N/a				3:01.744	1st place, gold medalist(s)
Arnold Rodríguez	C-1 200 m	41.683	2 QF	Bye		41.459	3rd place, bronze medalist(s)
Rolexis Baez	C-1 1000 m	—N/a				4:20.164	4
José Carlos Bulnes; Serguey Torres	C-2 1000 m	—N/a				3:49.932	3rd place, bronze medalist(s)

Women

Athlete	Event	Heats		Semifinals		Final	
Athlete	Event	Time	Rank	Time	Rank	Time	Rank
Yusmari Mengana	K-1 200 m	42.038	1 QF	Bye		42.946	1st place, gold medalist(s)
Yusmari Mengana	K-1 500 m	1:52.671	1 QF	Bye		2:00.656	1st place, gold medalist(s)
Yurieni Guerra; Yusmari Mengana	K-2 500 m	—N/a				1:48.653	1st place, gold medalist(s)
Yurieni Guerra; Jessica Hernandez; Daniela Martin; Lisandra Torres	K-4 500 m	—N/a				1:37.665	2nd place, silver medalist(s)
Amalia Obregón	C-1 200 m	—N/a				57.569	6

Qualification Legend: QF = Qualify to final; QS = Qualify to semifinal

== Cycling ==
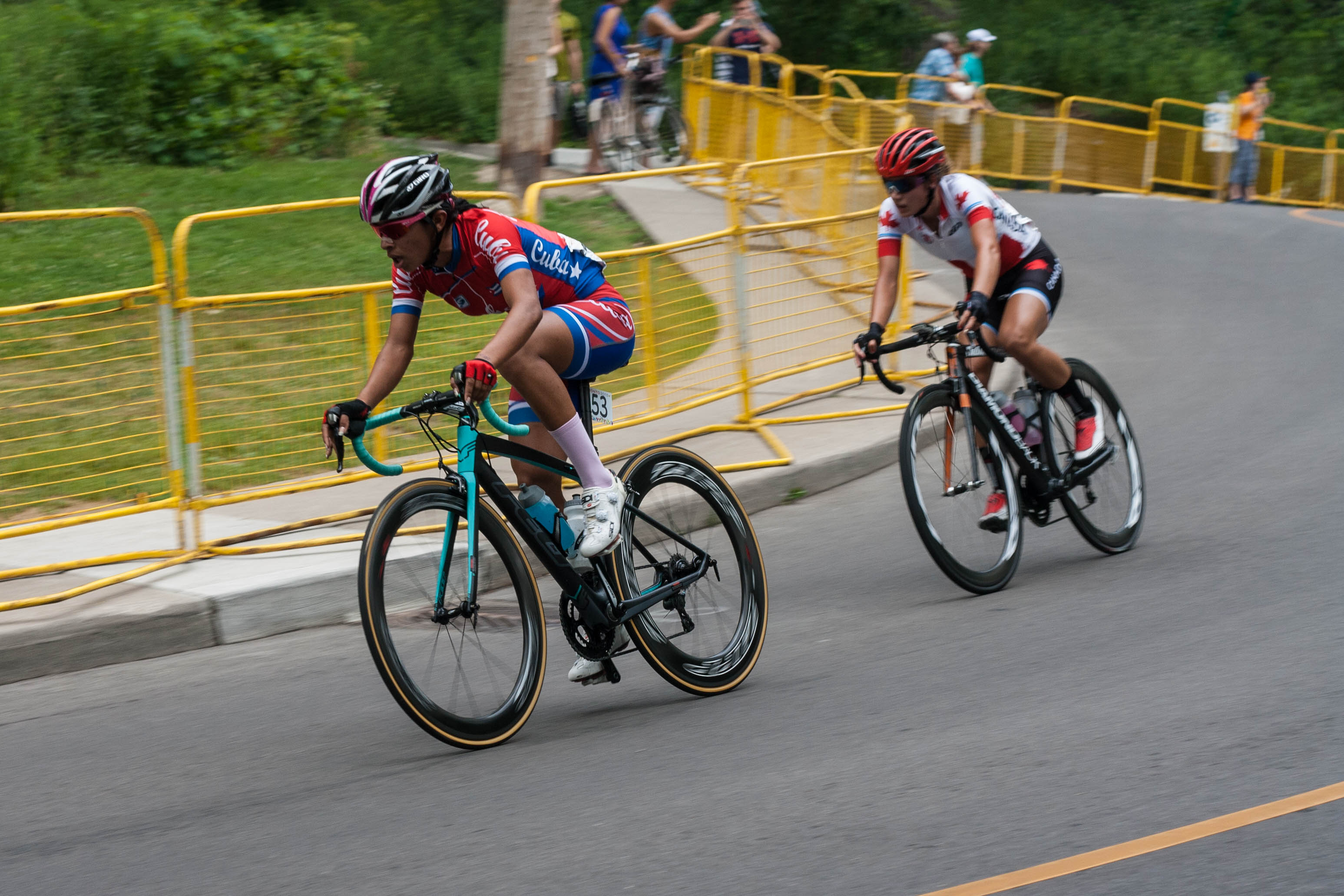
Marlies Mejías during the road race.

== Fencing ==
Cuba qualified 14 fencers (5 men, 9 women).

Men

Athlete	Event	Pool Round		Round of 16	Quarterfinals	Semifinals	Final / BM	
Athlete	Event	Victories	Seed	Opposition Score	Opposition Score	Opposition Score	Opposition Score	Rank
Reynier Henrique	Épée	4	5 Q	Schwantes (BRA); 13–14	did not advance			
Yunior Reytor	Épée	1	16 Q	Boisvert-Simard (CAN); 10–15	did not advance			
Reynier Henrique; Ringo Quintero; Yunior Reytor	Épée Team	—N/a			Canada; W 45–37	Venezuela; L 2–3	Colombia; W 43–39	3rd place, bronze medalist(s)
Jesus Riano	Foil	3	9 Q	Toldo (BRA); L 8–15	did not advance			
Noslen Montalvo	Sabre	2	10 Q	Padilla (MEX); W 15–15	Bustamante (ARG); L 6–15	did not advance		

Women

Athlete	Event	Pool Round		Round of 16	Quarterfinals	Semifinals	Final / BM	
Athlete	Event	Victories	Seed	Opposition Score	Opposition Score	Opposition Score	Opposition Score	Rank
Seily Mendoza	Épée	0	18	did not advance				
Yamirka Rodriguez	Épée	4	1 Q	Hoppe (CAN); W 15–8	Peguero (DOM); L 14–15	did not advance		
Yoslaine Cardenal; Seily Mendoza; Yamirka Rodriguez	Épée Team	—N/a			Canada; W 45–26	Venezuela; L 31–37	Brazil; L 29–38	4
Elizabeth Hidalgo	Foil	3	7 Q	Moreno (CUB); W 15–14	Goldie (CAN); L 2–15	did not advance		
Daylen Moreno	Foil	3	10 Q	Hidalgo (CUB); L 14–15	did not advance			
Elizabeth Hidalgo; Daylen Moreno; Elisa Tamayo	Foil Team	—N/a			United States; L 19–45	Chile; W 44–35; Classification match	Venezuela; L 39–40; Fifth place match	6
Yaritza Goulet	Sabre	3	7 Q	Benítez (VEN); L 10–15	did not advance			
Jennifer Morales	Sabre	1	14 Q	Félix (DOM); L 10–15	did not advance			
Yaritza Goulet; Jennifer Morales; Darlin Robert	Sabre Team	—N/a			Canada; W 45–39	United States; L 33–45	Venezuela; L 38–45	4

== Field hockey ==
Cuba qualified both a men's and women's teams, for a total of 32 athletes (16 men and 16 women). Both teams finished in eighth and last place.

=== Men's tournament ===
Roster

Head Coach: Guillermo Stakeman

1. Leordan Hernandez (GK)
2. Yendry Delgado (GK)
3. Alexander Abreu
4. Dani Alonso
7. Vladimir Prado
8. Darian Valero
9. Reynaldo Gonzalez
11. Yoandy Blanco
12. Maikel Tritzant
13. Raidel Ortiz
14. Yoel Veitia
15. Minel Mrado
16. Roger Aguilera (c)
17. Adrian Molina
18. Marcos Martinez
20. Yasmany Gutierrez

Pool A

Pos	Team	Pld	W	D	L	GF	GA	GD	Pts	Qualification
1	Argentina	3	3	0	0	22	4	+18	9	Quarter-finals
2	United States	3	1	1	1	5	10	−5	4	Quarter-finals
3	Cuba	3	0	2	1	9	10	−1	2	Quarter-finals
4	Trinidad and Tobago	3	0	1	2	3	15	−12	1	Quarter-finals

Source: FIH
Rules for classification: 1) points; 2) matches won; 3) goal difference; 4) goals for; 5) head-to-head result.

14 July 2015
11:00

United States	3–3	Cuba
Runzi 9'; Käppeler 24'; Holt 28'	Report	Tritzant 32'; Blanco 51', 59'

Umpires:
Matias Barbosa (CHI)
David Sweetman (GBR)

16 July 2015
09:00

Trinidad and Tobago	2–2	Cuba
Toussaint 51'; Eccles 59'	Report	Blanco 22', 53'

Umpires:
Daniel Basto Rivero (MEX)
Grant Hundley (USA)

18 July 2015
09:00

Argentina	5–4	Cuba
Vila 18'; Peillat 28', 37', 55'; Menini 29'	Report	Blanco 21'; Veitia 47', 57'; Aguilera 52'

Umpires:
Gavin Caldecott (CAN)
Matias Barbosa (CHI)

Quarterfinals

21 July 2015
11:30

Chile	6–2	Cuba
Prada 38'; Richter 43'; F. Renz 46'; Martín 47', 60'; Rodríguez 57'	Report	Blanco 15'; Tritzant 51'

Umpires:
You Suolong (CHN)
Andres Ledesma (ARG)

Classification round

23 July 2015
09:00

Mexico	3–1	Cuba
Campillo Lopez 29'; Pedraza Saenz 32'; García Miranda 50'	Report	Gutierrez 43'

Umpires:
Donny Gobinsingh (TTO)
Francisco Vázquez (ESP)

Seventh place match

25 July 2015
09:00

Cuba	0–13	Trinidad and Tobago
	Report	Pierre 5', 13', 26'; Reynos 6', 47'; Murray 20', 35', 46'; Emmanuel 28'; Gilkes 31', 33'; Campbell 43'; Mouttet 44'

Umpires:
Matias Barbosa (CHI)
Saleem Aaron (USA)

2015 Pan American Games 8th

Cuba

=== Women's tournament ===
Roster

The Cuba field hockey women's team that will compete at the 2015 Pan American Games:

- Yailyn Abrahan
- Mileysi Argentel
- Yusnaidy Betancourt
- Helec Carta
- Heidy González
- Roseli Harrys
- Ismary Hernández
- Tahimi Licea
- Yunia Milanés
- Sunaylis Nikle
- Yaniuska Paso
- Brizaida Ramos
- Annelis Reyna
- Marisbel Sierra
- Damnay Solis
- Yuraima Vera

Pool B

Pos	Team	Pld	W	D	L	GF	GA	GD	Pts	Qualification
1	United States	3	3	0	0	19	0	+19	9	Quarterfinals
2	Chile	3	2	0	1	10	4	+6	6	Quarterfinals
3	Uruguay	3	1	0	2	3	10	−7	3	Quarterfinals
4	Cuba	3	0	0	3	4	22	−18	0	Quarterfinals

Source: FIH
Rules for classification: 1) points; 2) goal difference; 3) goals scored; 4) head-to-head result.

13 July 2015
09:00

Chile	7–2	Cuba
D. Caram 6', 16'; Villagra 27'; García 44'; Pizarro 47'; Filipek 47'; C. Caram 58'	Report	Sierra 24', 27'

Umpires:
Megan Robertson (CAN)
Stephanie Judefind (USA)

15 July 2015
11:00

Uruguay	3–2	Cuba
Barrandeguy 10'; Vilar del Valle 29'; Olave Solari 47'	Report	Vera 22'; Paso 32'

Umpires:
Stephanie Judefind (USA)
Suzi Sutton (USA)

17 July 2015
09:00

United States	12–0	Cuba
O'Donnell 2', 25'; Selenski 15'; González 17', 50'; Dawson 21'; Witmer 27', 54'; Vittese 35'; K. Reinprecht 36'; Falgowski 47'; Kasold 48'	Report

Umpires:
Meghan McLennan (CAN)
Ayanna McClean (TTO)

Quarterfinal

20 July 2015
09:00

Argentina	10–0	Cuba
Sánchez Moccia 5', 52'; Barrionuevo 15', 17', 22', 43', 51'; Romang 20'; F. Habif 24'; Molina 25'	Report

Umpires:
Suzi Sutton (USA)
Meghan McLennan (CAN)

Classification round

22 July 2015
09:00

Cuba	0–1	Mexico
	Report	C. Correa 10'

Umpires:
Camila Cabargas (CHI)
Nur Hafizah Azman (MAS)

Seventh place match

24 July 2015
09:00

Cuba	1–2	Dominican Republic
Vera 59'	Report	Ortega Mateo 19'; Oflaherti Paganini 34'

Umpires:
Nur Hafizah Azman (MAS)
Verónica Villafañe (ARG)

2015 Pan American Games 8th

Cuba

== Gymnastics ==
Cuba qualified 17 gymnasts.

=== Artistic ===
Cuba qualified a full team of 10 artistic gymnasts.

Men
Team & Individual Qualification

Athlete	Event	Final							
Athlete	Event	Apparatus						Total	Rank
Athlete	Event	F	PH	R	V	PB	HB	Total	Rank
	Qualification								
Total	Team								

Qualification Legend: Q = Qualified to apparatus final

Women
Team & Individual Qualification

Athlete	Event	Individual qualification/Team Final						Individual all around final					
Athlete	Event	Apparatus				Total	Rank	Apparatus				Total	Rank
Athlete	Event	V	UB	BB	F	Total	Rank	V	UB	BB	F	Total	Rank
Mary Morffi	Qualification	DNS	10.850	12.450	12.450	35.750	40	did not advance					
Leidys Perdomo	Qualification	14.150	DNS	DNS	13.850 Q	28.000	44	did not advance					
Leidys Rojas	Qualification	14.200	13.050	12.450	12.750	52.450	10 Q	11.200	12.700	13.250	12.950	50.100	16
Dovelis Torres	Qualification	14.300	12.450	13.150	DNS	39.900	31	did not advance					
Marcia Videaux	Qualification	14.850 Q	13.350	12.950	11.150	52.300	11 Q	14.700	13.500	11.600	13.250	53.050	9
Total	Team	43.350	38.850	38.550	39.050	159.800	4	—N/a					

Qualification Legend: Q = Qualified to apparatus final

Individual finals

Athlete	Event	Total	Rank
Marcia Videaux	Vault	14.737	1st place, gold medalist(s)
Leidys Perdomo	Floor	13.425	5

=== Rhythmic ===
Cuba qualified a team of seven rhythmic gymnasts (six in group and one in individual).

Individual

Athlete	Event	Final					
Athlete	Event	Hoop	Ball	Clubs	Ribbon	Total	Rank
Brenda Leyva	Individual	12.742	13.000	12.492	12.533	50.767	10

Group

Athletes	Event	Final			
Athletes	Event	5 Ribbons	6 Clubs & 2 Hoops	Total	Rank
Claudia Arjona; Zenia Fernandez; Melissa Kindelan; Martha Perez; Adriana Ramirez; Legna Savon	Group all-around	13.492	12.200	25.692	3rd place, bronze medalist(s)
Claudia Arjona; Zenia Fernandez; Melissa Kindelan; Martha Perez; Adriana Ramirez; Legna Savon	Group 5 Ribbons	—N/a		11.900	4
Claudia Arjona; Zenia Fernandez; Melissa Kindelan; Martha Perez; Adriana Ramirez; Legna Savon	Group 6 Clubs & 2 Hoops	—N/a		12.825	5

== Handball ==
Cuba qualified a men's and women's teams. Each team will consist of 15 athletes, for a total of 30.

=== Men's tournament ===
The Cuba handball men's team that will compete at the 2015 Pan American Games:

Head coach: (Cuba) Luis Delisle

No.	Pos.	Name	Date of birth (age)	Height	App.	Goals	Club
1	GK	Alejandro Romero	17 September 1994 (age 31)	1.92 m	22		(Cuba) Habana
2	LB	Pedro Veitia	17 August 1994 (age 31)	1.88 m	19		(Cuba) Villa Clara
3	RW	Omar Toledano	3 March 1995 (age 31)	1.94 m	28		Santiago de Cuba
4	CB	Daniel Garcia	31 December 1996 (age 29)	1.97 m	20		Santiago de Cuba
5	RB	Angel Rivero	24 October 1992 (age 33)	1.87 m	22		(Cuba) Holguin
6	LW	Pavel Caballero	20 September 1991 (age 34)	1.83 m	31		(Cuba) Matanzas
7	LB	Yoan Balazquez	26 December 1995 (age 30)	1.94 m	32		(Cuba) Matanzas
9	CB	Reinier Taboada	2 June 1997 (age 29)	1.91 m	19		(Cuba) Habana
10	LW	Yanquiel Cruzata	12 November 1991 (age 34)	1.80 m	26		Santiago de Cuba
12	GK	Reyniel Justa	27 August 1991 (age 34)	1.98 m	31		(Cuba) Ciego de Avila
13	RB	Angel Hernandez	4 February 1994 (age 32)	1.87 m	24		(Cuba) Matanzas
15	P	Alain Vizcay	10 June 1992 (age 34)	1.89 m	23		Santiago de Cuba
16	GK	Magnol Suarez	10 August 1994 (age 32)	2.00 m	20		(Cuba) Ciego de Avila
17	CB	Noelvis Robles	29 June 1986 (age 40)	1.86 m	56		(Cuba) Holguin

Group B

Team	Pld	W	D	L	GF	GA	GD	Pts	Qualification
Argentina	3	3	0	0	103	63	+40	6	Qualified for the Semifinals
Chile	3	1	1	1	87	84	+3	3	Qualified for the Semifinals
Cuba	3	1	1	1	87	89	−2	3	
Puerto Rico	3	0	0	3	68	109	−41	0	

July 17; 18:30	Argentina	35–18	Cuba	Exhibition Centre – Hall B Referees: Pinto, Menezes (BRA)
July 17; 18:30	Fernandez, Pizarro 8	(19–10)	Balazquez 7	Exhibition Centre – Hall B Referees: Pinto, Menezes (BRA)
July 17; 18:30	3× (yellow card) 5× (suspension)	report	2× (yellow card) 6× (suspension)	Exhibition Centre – Hall B Referees: Pinto, Menezes (BRA)

July 19; 20:30	Cuba	31–31	Chile	Exhibition Centre – Hall B Referees: Gjeding, Hansen (DEN)
July 19; 20:30	Robles 8	(14–13)	R. Salinas 12	Exhibition Centre – Hall B Referees: Gjeding, Hansen (DEN)
July 19; 20:30	2× (yellow card) 7× (suspension)	Report	3× (yellow card) 8× (suspension)	Exhibition Centre – Hall B Referees: Gjeding, Hansen (DEN)

July 21; 18:30	Cuba	38–23	Puerto Rico	Exhibition Centre – Hall B Referees: Lemes, Sosa (URU)
July 21; 18:30	Toledano 13	(22–13)	Hiraldo 7	Exhibition Centre – Hall B Referees: Lemes, Sosa (URU)
July 21; 18:30	1× (yellow card) 6× (suspension)	report	4× (yellow card) 5× (suspension)	Exhibition Centre – Hall B Referees: Lemes, Sosa (URU)

Classification round

July 23; 18:00	Dominican Republic	24–40	Cuba	Exhibition Centre – Hall B Referees: Minore, Marina (ARG)
July 23; 18:00	Mateo 6	(12–20)	Hernandez 9	Exhibition Centre – Hall B Referees: Minore, Marina (ARG)
July 23; 18:00	3× (yellow card) 6× (suspension)	report	3× (yellow card) 3× (suspension)	Exhibition Centre – Hall B Referees: Minore, Marina (ARG)

Fifth place match

July 25
13:00
Puerto Rico
39–38 (ET)
Cuba
Exhibition Centre – Hall B
Referees: Lemes, Sosa (URU)
Hiraldo 13
(17–15)
Hernandez 15
3× (yellow card) 3× (suspension)
report
3× (yellow card) 4× (suspension) 2× (red card)

FT: 33–33 ET: 6–5

=== Women's tournament ===
Head coach: Maturell

- Niurkis Mora
- Milena Mesa
- Ayling Martínez
- Livia Varanes
- Raiza Beltran
- Niuris Ferrer
- Lizandra Lusson
- Gleinys Reyes
- Yunisleidy Camejo
- Ismary Barrio
- Eneleidis Guevara
- Lisandra Espinosa
- Yenma Ramírez
- Marines Rojas
- Eyatne Rizo

Group B

Team	Pld	W	D	L	GF	GA	GD	Pts	Qualification
Argentina	3	2	0	1	75	60	+15	4	Qualified for the Semifinals
Uruguay	3	2	0	1	80	74	+6	4	Qualified for the Semifinals
Cuba	3	2	0	1	83	83	0	4	
Chile	3	0	0	3	69	90	−21	0	

July 16; 20:30	Chile	25–28	Cuba	Exhibition Centre – Hall B Referees: Guzman, Perez (PUR)
July 16; 20:30	Feuchtmann, Torres 5	(11–14)	Lusson 10	Exhibition Centre – Hall B Referees: Guzman, Perez (PUR)
July 16; 20:30	2× (yellow card) 5× (suspension)	report	1× (yellow card) 7× (suspension) 1× (red card)	Exhibition Centre – Hall B Referees: Guzman, Perez (PUR)

July 18; 18:30	Cuba	27–25	Argentina	Exhibition Centre – Hall B Referees: Martin Gjeding, Mads Hansen (DEN)
July 18; 18:30	Lusson 14	(14–13)	Mendoza 9	Exhibition Centre – Hall B Referees: Martin Gjeding, Mads Hansen (DEN)
July 18; 18:30	1× (yellow card) 8× (suspension)	Report	3× (yellow card) 2× (suspension)	Exhibition Centre – Hall B Referees: Martin Gjeding, Mads Hansen (DEN)

July 20; 18:30	Uruguay	33–28	Cuba	Exhibition Centre – Hall B Referees: Minore, Marina (ARG)
July 20; 18:30	Barreiro 10	(13–12)	Lusson 9	Exhibition Centre – Hall B Referees: Minore, Marina (ARG)
July 20; 18:30	4× (yellow card) 4× (suspension)	report	2× (yellow card) 5× (suspension)	Exhibition Centre – Hall B Referees: Minore, Marina (ARG)

Classification round

July 22; 18:00	Canada	20–30	Cuba	Exhibition Centre – Hall B Referees: Lemes, Sosa (URU)
July 22; 18:00	Routhier 5	(7–18)	Lusson 9	Exhibition Centre – Hall B Referees: Lemes, Sosa (URU)
July 22; 18:00	3× (yellow card) 2× (suspension)	report	4× (yellow card) 5× (suspension)	Exhibition Centre – Hall B Referees: Lemes, Sosa (URU)

Fifth place match

July 24; 13:00	Puerto Rico	27–40	Cuba	Exhibition Centre – Hall B Referees: Pinto, Menezes (BRA)
July 24; 13:00	three players 5	(14–20)	Reyes, Barrio 7	Exhibition Centre – Hall B Referees: Pinto, Menezes (BRA)
July 24; 13:00	2× (yellow card) 2× (suspension)	report	1× (yellow card) 6× (suspension)	Exhibition Centre – Hall B Referees: Pinto, Menezes (BRA)

== Judo ==
Cuba qualified a full team of fourteen judokas (seven men and seven women).

Men

Athlete	Event	Round of 16	Quarterfinals	Semifinals	Repechage	Final / BM	
Athlete	Event	Opposition Result	Opposition Result	Opposition Result	Opposition Result	Opposition Result	Rank
	−60 kg						
	−66 kg						
	−73 kg						
	−81 kg						
	−90 kg						
	−100 kg						
	+100 kg						

Women

Athlete	Event	Round of 16	Quarterfinals	Semifinals	Repechage	Final / BM	
Athlete	Event	Opposition Result	Opposition Result	Opposition Result	Opposition Result	Opposition Result	Rank
	−48 kg						
	−52 kg						
	−57 kg						
	−63 kg						
	−70 kg						
	−78 kg						
	+78 kg						

== Karate ==
Cuba qualified 3 athletes.

Athlete	Event	Round robin				Semifinals	Final	
Athlete	Event	Opposition Result	Opposition Result	Opposition Result	Rank	Opposition Result	Opposition Result	Rank
	Men's –67 kg							
	Men's +84 kg							
	Women's +68 kg							

== Modern pentathlon ==
Cuba qualified a team of 4 athletes (2 men and 2 women).

Athlete	Event	Fencing (Épée One Touch)			Swimming (200m Freestyle)			Riding (Show Jumping)			Shooting/Running (10 m Air Pistol/3000m)			Total Points	Final Rank
Athlete	Event	Results	Rank	MP Points	Time	Rank	MP Points	Penalties	Rank	MP Points	Time	Rank	MP Points	Total Points	Final Rank
Jose Ricardo Figueroa	Men's	17	=7	226	2:11.40	20	306	12	3	288	11:46.19	1	594	1415	4
Yaniel Velázquez	Men's	14	=13	202	2:06.92	10	320	28	=13	272	13:57.55	20	463	1257	15
Ilianny Manzano	Women's	9	15	136	2:31.48	19	246	DNS	=20	0	15:13.34	18	387	829	20
Leydi Moya	Women's	13	=5	234	2:17.19	5	289	29	15	271	13:46.36	10	474	1268	7

== Rowing ==
Cuba qualified all 14 boats. The final team consisted of 22 athletes (15 men and 7 women).

Men

Athlete	Event	Heats		Repechage		Final	
Athlete	Event	Time	Rank	Time	Rank	Time	Rank
Ángel Fournier	Single sculls	7.11.74	1 FA	Bye		7:51.39	1st place, gold medalist(s)
Ángel Fournier; Eduardo Rubio	Double sculls	6:27.28	1 FA	Bye		6:30.35	1st place, gold medalist(s)
Raúl Hernández; Liosbel Hernández	Lwt double sculls	6:45.83	1 FA	Bye		6:24.88	3rd place, bronze medalist(s)
Ángel Fournier; Adrian Oquendo; Eduardo Rubio; Orlando Sotolongo	Quadruple sculls	6:02.29	2 FA	—N/a		5:44.39	2nd place, silver medalist(s)
Janier Concepción; Solaris Freire	Coxless pair	7:22.82	3 R	7:19.34	5	Did not advance	7
Janier Concepción; Solaris Freire; Adrian Oquendo; Manuel Suárez	Coxless four	6:46.19	4 FA	—N/a		6:14.03	2nd place, silver medalist(s)
Maximo Arango; Raúl Hernández; Liosbel Hernández; Liosmel Ramos	Lwt coxless Four	6:17.95	2 R	6:54.23	4 FA	DNS	6
Eduardo González; Jose Rodriguez; Eduardo Rubio; Ángel Fournier; Manuel Suárez; Solaris Freire; Adrian Oquendo; Janier Concepción; Juan Carlos González (C)	Eight	7:47.30	5 FA	—N/a		6:14.00	4

Women

Athlete	Event	Heats		Repechage		Final	
Athlete	Event	Time	Rank	Time	Rank	Time	Rank
Yariulvis Cobas	Single sculls	8:02.67	3 R	8:43.73	3 FA	7:46.21	4
Yislena Hernandez	Lwt single sculls	8:17.78	3 R	8:42.19	2 FA	9:20.97	6
Yariulvis Cobas; Aimee Hernandez	Double sculls	7:24.91	4 FA	—N/a		7:20.00	3rd place, bronze medalist(s)
Licet Hernandez; Yislena Hernandez	Lwt double sculls	7:33.70	1 FA	Bye		7:00.36	2nd place, silver medalist(s)
Yariulvis Cobas; Aimee Hernandez; Yarilexis Reyes; Yudeisy Rodriguez	Quadruple sculls	6:53.06	3 FA	—N/a		7:27.56	4
Yarilexis Reyes; Yeney Ochoa	Coxless pair	7:57.79	5 FA	—N/a		8:01.65	5

Qualification Legend: FA= Final A (medal); FB= Final B (non-medal); R= Repechage DNS= Did not start

== Sailing ==
Cuba qualified 2 boats (three athletes).

Athlete	Event	Race													Net Points	Final Rank
Athlete	Event	1	2	3	4	5	6	7	8	9	10	11	12	M*	Net Points	Final Rank
Sanlay Castro	Women's laser radial	14	14	(16)	12	9	11	9	16	3	16	10	13	DNQ	127	13
Raúl Díaz; Rafael García	Open snipe	4	4	4	4	5	6	9	6	(11); OSC	10	9	9	DNQ	70	7

== Shooting ==
Cuba qualified 17 shooters.

== Softball ==
Cuba qualified a women's squad of 15 athletes.

=== Women's tournament ===
Group A

Team	Pld	W	L	RF	RA	RD	Qualification
United States	5	5	0	43	4	+39	Qualified for the semifinals
Canada	5	4	1	21	14	+7	Qualified for the semifinals
Puerto Rico	5	3	2	18	17	+1	Qualified for the semifinals
Brazil	5	2	3	7	19	−12	Qualified for the semifinals
Cuba	5	1	4	10	23	−13	
Dominican Republic	5	0	5	14	36	−22	

19 July 2015; 14:00	Dominican Republic	1 – 3	Cuba	President’s Choice Ajax Pan Am Ballpark, Ajax; Attendance: 2,895
19 July 2015; 14:00		Boxscore		President’s Choice Ajax Pan Am Ballpark, Ajax; Attendance: 2,895

20 July 2015; 19:00	Canada	5 – 0	Cuba	President’s Choice Ajax Pan Am Ballpark, Ajax; Attendance: 546
20 July 2015; 19:00		Boxscore		President’s Choice Ajax Pan Am Ballpark, Ajax; Attendance: 546

21 July 2015; 14:00	Puerto Rico	3 – 2	Cuba	President’s Choice Ajax Pan Am Ballpark, Ajax; Attendance: 832
21 July 2015; 14:00		Boxscore		President’s Choice Ajax Pan Am Ballpark, Ajax; Attendance: 832

22 July 2015; 16:30	Cuba	2 – 9	United States	President’s Choice Ajax Pan Am Ballpark, Ajax; Attendance: 450
22 July 2015; 16:30		Boxscore		President’s Choice Ajax Pan Am Ballpark, Ajax; Attendance: 450

23 July 2015; 16:30	Brazil	5 – 3	Cuba	President’s Choice Ajax Pan Am Ballpark, Ajax; Attendance: 347
23 July 2015; 16:30		Boxscore		President’s Choice Ajax Pan Am Ballpark, Ajax; Attendance: 347

== Synchronized swimming ==
Cuba qualified a full team of nine athletes.

Athlete	Event	Technical Routine		Free Routine (Final)			
Athlete	Event	Points	Rank	Points	Rank	Total Points	Rank
Cristy Alfonso; Melissa Alonso	Women's duet	65.5485	11	65.5000	11	131.0485	11
Cristy Alfonso; Melissa Alonso; Keyla Armas; Yanela Chacon; Dyliam Marrero; Jennifer Quintanal; Sonia Roche; Odailys Suarez; Carysney Garcia	Women's team	63.8392	8	64.8333	8	128.2725	8

== Table tennis ==
Cuba qualified a men's and women's team, for a total of six athletes.

Men

Athlete	Event	Group Stage				Round of 32	Round of 16	Quarterfinals	Semifinals	Final / BM	
Athlete	Event	Opposition Result	Opposition Result	Opposition Result	Rank	Opposition Result	Opposition Result	Opposition Result	Opposition Result	Opposition Result	Rank
	Singles										
	Team					—N/a					

Women

Athlete	Event	Group Stage				Round of 32	Round of 16	Quarterfinals	Semifinals	Final / BM	
Athlete	Event	Opposition Result	Opposition Result	Opposition Result	Rank	Opposition Result	Opposition Result	Opposition Result	Opposition Result	Opposition Result	Rank
	Singles										
	Team					—N/a					

== Tennis ==
Cuba received two wildcard spots in the men's events.

Men

Athlete	Event	1st round	Round of 32	Round of 16	Quarterfinals	Semifinals	Final
Athlete	Event	Opposition Score	Opposition Score	Opposition Score	Opposition Score	Opposition Score	Opposition Score
William Geronimo Dorantes	Singles	Bye	Escobar (ECU); L 2–6, 0–6	did not advance			
Omar Alberto Hernandez	Singles	Galeano (PAR); L 3–6, 1–6	did not advance				
William Geronimo Dorantes; Omar Alberto Hernandez	Doubles	—N/a		Arus / Behar (URU); L 3–6, 2–6	did not advance		

== Taekwondo ==
Cuba qualified a team of seven athletes (three men and four women).

Men

Athlete	Event	Preliminaries	Quarterfinals	Semifinals	Repechage	Final / BM	
Athlete	Event	Opposition Result	Opposition Result	Opposition Result	Opposition Result	Opposition Result	Rank
Fermin Quesada	68 kg	Contreras (VEN); L 7–10	did not advance				
Jose Cobas	80 kg	De Olveira (BRA); W 8–5	Medina (VEN); W 18–6	Lizarraga (MEX); W 5–4	—N/a	Hernández (DOM); W 10–9	1st place, gold medalist(s)
Rafael Alba	+80 kg	Bye	Yun (USA); W 15–3	Lopez (MEX); W 8–5	—N/a	Rivas (VEN); W 11–4	1st place, gold medalist(s)

Women

Athlete	Event	Preliminaries	Quarterfinals	Semifinals	Repechage	Final / BM	
Athlete	Event	Opposition Result	Opposition Result	Opposition Result	Opposition Result	Opposition Result	Rank
Yania Aguirre	49 kg	Dellan (VEN); W 9–7	Sing (BRA); W 6–5	Zamora (GUA); W 17–5	—N/a	Manjarrez (MEX); W 10–9	1st place, gold medalist(s)
Yamicel Nunez	57 kg	Abadia (GUA); W 12–0	Lewis (USA); L 6–8	Did not advance	Bye	Gonda (CAN); W 10–3	3rd place, bronze medalist(s)
Daima Villalon	67 kg	Figueroa (CHI); W 12–0	McPherson (USA); L 3–5	Did not advance	Bye	Alvarado (CRC); W 9–3	3rd place, bronze medalist(s)
Lisbeilys Ferran	+67 kg	Joseph (ISV); W 12–0	Galloway (USA); L 7–11	Did not advance	Bye	Bravo (COL); L 3–9	5

== Volleyball ==
Cuba qualified a men's and women's volleyball team, for a total of 24 athletes (12 men and 12 women).

=== Men's tournament ===
Pos	Team	Pld	W	L	Pts	SPW	SPL	SPR	SW	SL	SR
1	Brazil	3	2	1	12	258	220	1.173	8	3	2.667
2	Argentina	3	2	1	9	243	205	1.185	6	4	1.500
3	Cuba	3	2	1	9	255	255	1.000	7	5	1.400
4	Colombia	3	0	3	0	149	225	0.662	0	9	0.000

Source: Archived 2016-03-04 at the Wayback Machine

17 July 2015; 21:00	Argentina	3–1	Cuba	Exhibition Centre, Toronto; Attendance: 3,050
17 July 2015; 21:00	(25–20, 25–15, 23–25, 25–15) result statistics			Exhibition Centre, Toronto; Attendance: 3,050

19 July 2015; 13:35	Brazil	2–3	Cuba	Exhibition Centre, Toronto; Attendance: 4,500
19 July 2015; 13:35	(20–25, 25–18, 23–25, 25–22, 11–15) result statistics			Exhibition Centre, Toronto; Attendance: 4,500

21 July 2015; 22:01	Cuba	3–0	Colombia	Exhibition Centre, Toronto; Attendance: 900
21 July 2015; 22:01	(25–16, 25–19, 25–18) result statistics			Exhibition Centre, Toronto; Attendance: 900

Quarterfinal

22 July 2015; 21:12	Puerto Rico	3–2	Cuba	Exhibition Centre, Toronto; Attendance: 3,100
22 July 2015; 21:12	(20–25, 22–25, 25–21, 25–20, 15–11) result statistics			Exhibition Centre, Toronto; Attendance: 3,100

Fifth place match

24 July 2015; 15:35	Cuba	3–1	United States	Exhibition Centre, Toronto; Attendance: 3,100
24 July 2015; 15:35	(28–30, 25–22, 25–14, 25–22) result statistics			Exhibition Centre, Toronto; Attendance: 3,100

2015 Pan American Games 5th place

Cuba

=== Women's tournament ===
Team

- Regla Gracia
- Alena Rojas
- Melissa Vargas
- Yamila Hernández
- Daymara Lescay
- Emily Borrell
- Gretell Moreno
- Dayamí Sánchez
- Beatriz Vílchez
- Heidy Casanova
- Sulian Matienzo
- Jennifer Álvarez

Standings

Pos	Team	Pld	W	L	Pts	SPW	SPL	SPR	SW	SL	SR
1	Dominican Republic	3	2	1	10	261	215	1.214	7	4	1.750
2	Argentina	3	2	1	10	252	254	0.992	7	4	1.750
3	Cuba	3	1	2	5	248	259	0.958	4	7	0.571
4	Canada	3	1	2	5	228	261	0.874	4	7	0.571

Source: Archived 2015-10-20 at the Wayback Machine

Results

Date		Score		Set 1	Set 2	Set 3	Set 4	Set 5	Total	Report
Jul 16	Argentina	3–0	Cuba	25–23	26–24	25–19			76–66	P2 P3
Jul 18	Canada	3–1	Cuba	25–21	19–25	25–18	25–22		94–86	P2 P3
Jul 20	Dominican Republic	1–3	Cuba	22–25	22–25	25–21	20-25		89–96	P2 P3

Quarterfinals

Date		Score		Set 1	Set 2	Set 3	Set 4	Set 5	Total	Report
Jul 22	United States	3–1	Cuba	25–18	25–19	22–25	25–18		97–80	P2 P3

Fifth place match

Date		Score		Set 1	Set 2	Set 3	Set 4	Set 5	Total	Report
Jul 23	Argentina	1–3	Cuba	21–25	25–21	17–25	21-25		84–96	P2 P3

2015 Pan American Games 5th place

Cuba

== Water polo ==
Cuba qualified a men's and women's teams. Each team will consist of 13 athletes, for a total of 26.

=== Men's tournament ===
Roster

Cuba's team roster:

- Gianny Lara
- Rudy Despaigne
- Ernesto Cisneros
- Edgar Lara
- Ivey Arroyo
- Giraldo Carales
- Albert Guerra
- Remy De Armas
- Jose Peralta
- Raydel Carales
- Yohandry Andrade
- Raydel Martinez

Group A

Team	Pld	W	D	L	GF	GA	GD	Pts	Qualification
United States	3	3	0	0	62	7	+55	6	Qualified for the semifinals
Argentina	3	1	1	1	31	29	+2	3	Qualified for the semifinals
Cuba	3	1	1	1	21	31	−10	3	
Ecuador	3	0	0	3	11	58	−47	0	

8 July 2015; 18:08	Report	United States	21–4	Cuba	Markham Pan Am Centre; Referees: Jaume Teixido (ESP), Stephane Roy (CAN)
8 July 2015; 18:08	Report	Score by quarters: 6–2, 3–0, 6–1, 6–1			Markham Pan Am Centre; Referees: Jaume Teixido (ESP), Stephane Roy (CAN)
8 July 2015; 18:08	Report	Samuels 4	Goals	4 players 1	Markham Pan Am Centre; Referees: Jaume Teixido (ESP), Stephane Roy (CAN)

9 July 2015; 20:08	Report	Cuba	7–7	Argentina	Markham Pan Am Centre; Referees: William Mackay (CAN), Hugo Paredes (VEN).
9 July 2015; 20:08	Report	Score by quarters: 0-3, 1-1, 4-2, 2-1			Markham Pan Am Centre; Referees: William Mackay (CAN), Hugo Paredes (VEN).
9 July 2015; 20:08	Report	2 players 1	Goals	Demarchi 3, Carabantes 2, Corsi 1, Yanez 1	Markham Pan Am Centre; Referees: William Mackay (CAN), Hugo Paredes (VEN).

11 July 2015; 20:08	Report	Ecuador	3–10	Cuba	Markham Pan Am Centre; Referees: Joao Cardenuto (BRA), Claudia Aguilar (MEX)
11 July 2015; 20:08	Report	Score by quarters: 1-3, 0-2, 0-2, 2-3			Markham Pan Am Centre; Referees: Joao Cardenuto (BRA), Claudia Aguilar (MEX)
11 July 2015; 20:08	Report	Kaltenbach 2	Goals	Carales 3	Markham Pan Am Centre; Referees: Joao Cardenuto (BRA), Claudia Aguilar (MEX)

Fifth to Eight place

13 July 2015; 12:00	Report	Venezuela	9–8	Cuba	Markham Pan Am Centre; Referees: Reynel Castillo (PUR), Mark Maretzki (USA)
13 July 2015; 12:00	Report	Score by quarters: 1-3, 1-2, 2-1, 5-2			Markham Pan Am Centre; Referees: Reynel Castillo (PUR), Mark Maretzki (USA)
13 July 2015; 12:00	Report	Velazquez 2	Goals	Carales 4	Markham Pan Am Centre; Referees: Reynel Castillo (PUR), Mark Maretzki (USA)

Seventh place match

15 July 2015; 12:00	Report	Cuba	13–6	Ecuador	Markham Pan Am Centre; Referees: Claudia Aguilar (MEX), Hugo Paredes (VEN)
15 July 2015; 12:00	Report	Score by quarters: 2-1, 1-3, 5-2, 5-0			Markham Pan Am Centre; Referees: Claudia Aguilar (MEX), Hugo Paredes (VEN)
15 July 2015; 12:00	Report	Carales 5	Goals	Kaltenbach 3	Markham Pan Am Centre; Referees: Claudia Aguilar (MEX), Hugo Paredes (VEN)

=== Women's tournament ===
Roster

Cuba's team roster:

- Mairelis Zunzunegui
- Dalia Grau
- Yeliana Bravo
- Thaimi Gonzalez
- Adriana Garlobo
- Mayelin Bernal
- Yanet Lopez
- Maviel Mendiola
- Dayana Morales
- Yordanka Pujol
- Cecilia Diaz
- Gertrudis Ortiz
- Arisney Ramos

Group A

Team	Pld	W	D	L	GF	GA	GD	Pts	Qualification
United States	3	3	0	0	73	9	+64	6	Qualified for the semifinals
Cuba	3	2	0	1	24	30	−6	4	Qualified for the semifinals
Argentina	3	1	0	2	16	48	−32	2	
Mexico	3	0	0	3	20	46	−26	0	

8 July 2015; 10:08	Report	United States	18–3	Cuba	Markham Pan Am Centre; Referees: Edmundo Rodrigues (BRA), William Mackay (CAN)
8 July 2015; 10:08	Report	Score by quarters: 4–1, 4–0, 6–1, 4–1			Markham Pan Am Centre; Referees: Edmundo Rodrigues (BRA), William Mackay (CAN)
8 July 2015; 10:08	Report	Steffens, Fischer 3	Goals	3 players 1	Markham Pan Am Centre; Referees: Edmundo Rodrigues (BRA), William Mackay (CAN)

9 July 2015; 10:08	Report	Cuba	10–3	Argentina	Markham Pan Am Centre; Referees: Arnoldo Zambrano (VEN), Stephane Roy (CAN)
9 July 2015; 10:08	Report	Score by quarters: 1–0, 3–0, 3–1, 3–2			Markham Pan Am Centre; Referees: Arnoldo Zambrano (VEN), Stephane Roy (CAN)
9 July 2015; 10:08	Report	Bravo, Bernal 3	Goals	Hatcher 1, M De Virgilio 1, R De Virgilio 1	Markham Pan Am Centre; Referees: Arnoldo Zambrano (VEN), Stephane Roy (CAN)

11 July 2015; 10:08	Report	Mexico	9–11	Cuba	Markham Pan Am Centre; Referees: Reynel Castillo (PUR), William Mackay (CAN)
11 July 2015; 10:08	Report	Score by quarters: 4-4, 2-1, 2-3, 1-3			Markham Pan Am Centre; Referees: Reynel Castillo (PUR), William Mackay (CAN)
11 July 2015; 10:08	Report	Murrieta 3	Goals	Ortiz 2	Markham Pan Am Centre; Referees: Reynel Castillo (PUR), William Mackay (CAN)

Semifinals

12 July 2015; 18:00	Report	Cuba	7–14	Canada	Markham Pan Am Centre; Referees: Reynel Castillo (PUR), Diego Garibaldi (ARG)
12 July 2015; 18:00	Report	Score by quarters: 1-3, 1-5, 3-2, 2-4			Markham Pan Am Centre; Referees: Reynel Castillo (PUR), Diego Garibaldi (ARG)
12 July 2015; 18:00	Report	Bernal 2	Goals	Eggens, Robinson 3	Markham Pan Am Centre; Referees: Reynel Castillo (PUR), Diego Garibaldi (ARG)

Bronze medal match

14 July 2015; 18:00	Report	(bronze) Brazil	9–6	Cuba	Markham Pan Am Centre; Referees: Mark Maretzki (USA), William Mackay (CAN)
14 July 2015; 18:00	Report	Score by quarters: 2-0, 2-2, 2-2, 3-2			Markham Pan Am Centre; Referees: Mark Maretzki (USA), William Mackay (CAN)
14 July 2015; 18:00	Report	Chiappini 6	Goals	Ortiz 2	Markham Pan Am Centre; Referees: Mark Maretzki (USA), William Mackay (CAN)

== Weightlifting ==
Cuba qualified a team of 8 athletes (7 men and 1 woman).

== Wrestling ==
Cuba qualified 18 wrestlers (12 men and six women), the maximum. Julio Bastida (Greco-Roman 75 kg) was entered into the competition but did not compete and was not a part of the draw.

Men
Freestyle

Athlete	Event	Preliminaries	Quarterfinals	Semifinals	Final / BM	Rank
Athlete	Event	Opposition Result	Opposition Result	Opposition Result	Opposition Result	Rank
Yowlys Bonne	57 kg	—N/a	Bonilla (HON); W 10^{F}–0	Mejías (VEN); W 12–2	Escobedo (USA); W 10–0	1st place, gold medalist(s)
Franklin Marén	65 kg	Bye	Guzman (COL); W 12–0	Garcia (CAN); W 2–0	Metcalf (USA); L 2–8	2nd place, silver medalist(s)
Liván López	74 kg	Bye	Burroughs (USA); L 3–14	Bye	Balfour (CAN); W 10–0	3rd place, bronze medalist(s)
Reineris Salas	86 kg	—N/a	Tagziev (CAN); W 7–4	Ambrocio (PER); W 7–1	Herbert (USA); W 12–7	1st place, gold medalist(s)
Javier Cortina	97 kg	—N/a	Díaz (VEN); L 4–7	did not advance		
Andres Ramos	125 kg	—N/a	Vivenes (VEN); W 6–4	Rey (USA); L 0–2	Silva (NCA); W 10–0	3rd place, bronze medalist(s)

Greco-Roman

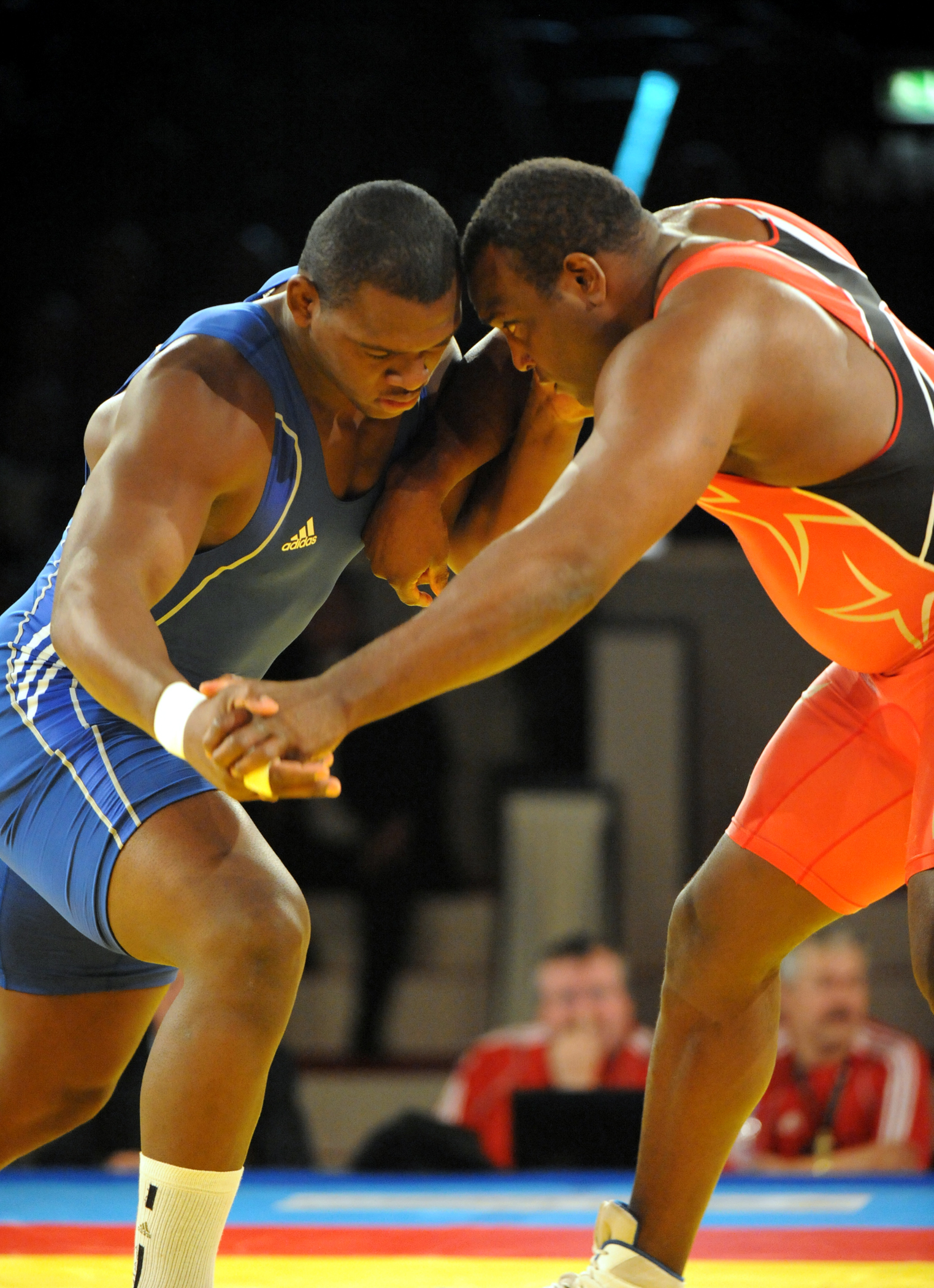
Mijaín López of Cuba, pictured on the left in 2009, won his fourth consecutive Pan American Games gold medal.

Athlete	Event	Preliminaries	Quarterfinals	Semifinals	Final / BM	Rank
Athlete	Event	Opposition Result	Opposition Result	Opposition Result	Opposition Result	Rank
Ismael Borrero	59 kg	Toro (COL); W 8–0	Mango (USA); L 3–3	did not advance		
Miguel Martinez	66 kg	—N/a	Cardenas (MEX); W 13–4	Rivas (VEN); L 1–2	Cuero (COL); W 6–0^{R}	3rd place, bronze medalist(s)
Alan Vera	85 kg	—N/a	Betancourt (PUR); W 8–0	Anderson (USA); L 0–8	Martinez (HON); W 9–0	3rd place, bronze medalist(s)
Yasmany Lugo	98 kg	—N/a	Loango (COL); W 9–0	Albino (BRA); W 8–0	Mejia (HON); W 4^{F}–0	1st place, gold medalist(s)
Mijaín López	130 kg	—N/a	Pérez (VEN); W 9–0	Smith (USA); W 8–0	Ayub (CHI); W 8–0	1st place, gold medalist(s)

Women
Freestyle

Athlete	Event	Quarterfinals	Semifinals	Final / BM	Rank
Athlete	Event	Opposition Result	Opposition Result	Opposition Result	Rank
Yusneylys Guzmán	48 kg	Barbosa (BRA); W 15–4	Morrison (CAN); L 0–6	Lampe (USA); L 2–12	5
Yamilka Del Valle	53 kg	Barry (CAN); W 10–1	Conder (USA); L 2–6^{F}	Jiménez (NCA); W WO	3rd place, bronze medalist(s)
Yaquelin Estornell	58 kg	Antes (ECU); W 5–5	Roa (COL); W 4–4	Silva (BRA); L 5–6	2nd place, silver medalist(s)
Katerina Vidiaux	63 kg	Clodgo (USA); W 11–7	Antes (ECU); W 8–2^{R}	Stone-Papadopoulos (CAN); L 3–7	2nd place, silver medalist(s)
Yudaris Sánchez	69 kg	Yeats (CAN); L 0–6^{F}	Did not advance	Vázquez (ARG); L 1–7	5
Lisset Hechavarria	75 kg	Olaya (COL); W 7–9	Di Stasio (CAN); L 4–4	Weffer (VEN); W 2–1	3rd place, bronze medalist(s)

== See also ==
- Cuba at the 2016 Summer Olympics
