= Rowing at the 2015 Pan American Games – Men's coxless four =

Rowing – Men's coxless four at the 2015 Pan American Games
- Venue: Royal Canadian Henley Rowing Course
- Dates: July 11 - July 13
- Competitors: 20 from 5 nations
- Winning time: 6:10.80

Medalists
Gold medal	Will Crothers; Tim Schrijver; Kai Langerfeld; Conlin McCabe	Canada
Silver medal	Manuel Suárez; Janier Concepción; Adrian Oquendo; Solaris Freire	Cuba
Bronze medal	Joaquín Iwan; Francisco Esteras; Ivan Carino; Agustin Diaz	Argentina

The men's coxless four rowing event at the 2015 Pan American Games was held from July 11–13 at the Royal Canadian Henley Rowing Course in St. Catharines.

== Schedule ==
All times are Eastern Standard Time (UTC-3).

Date	Time	Round
July 11, 2015	9:45	Heat
July 13, 2015	10:05	Final

== Results ==
=== Heat ===
Rank	Rowers	Country	Time	Notes
1	Will Crothers; Tim Schrijver; Kai Langerfeld; Conlin McCabe	Canada	6:18.01	F
2	Joaquín Iwan; Francisco Esteras; Ivan Carino; Agustin Diaz	Argentina	6:26.97	F
3	David Eick; Kyle Peabody; Nareg Guregian; Keane Johnson	United States	6:30.48	F
4	Manuel Suárez; Janier Concepción; Adrian Oquendo; Solaris Freire	Cuba	6:46.19	F
5	Pedro Henrique Drummond Gondin; Maciel Costa Da Silva; Leandro Tozzo; Allan Scaravaglioni Bitencourt	Brazil	6:57.20	F

=== Final ===
Rank	Rowers	Country	Time	Notes
1st place, gold medalist(s)	Will Crothers; Tim Schrijver; Kai Langerfeld; Conlin McCabe	Canada	6:10.80	
2nd place, silver medalist(s)	Manuel Suárez; Janier Concepción; Adrian Oquendo; Solaris Freire	Cuba	6:14.03	
3rd place, bronze medalist(s)	Joaquín Iwan; Francisco Esteras; Ivan Carino; Agustin Diaz	Argentina	6:16.52	
4	David Eick; Kyle Peabody; Nareg Guregian; Keane Johnson	United States	6:21.13	
5	Pedro Henrique Drummond Gondin; Maciel Costa Da Silva; Leandro Tozzo; Allan Scaravaglioni Bitencourt	Brazil	6:41.34	
