= Rowing at the 2015 Pan American Games – Men's lightweight double sculls =

Rowing – Men's lightweight double sculls at the 2015 Pan American Games
- Venue: Royal Canadian Henley Rowing Course
- Dates: July 11 - July 14
- Competitors: 18 from 9 nations
- Winning time Final A: 6:15.65

Medalists
Gold medal	Alan Armenta; Alexis López	Mexico
Silver medal	Colin Ethridge; Austin Meyer	United States
Bronze medal	Raúl Hernández; Liosbel Hernandez	Cuba

The men's lightweight double sculls rowing event at the 2015 Pan American Games was held from July 11–14 at the Royal Canadian Henley Rowing Course in St. Catharines.

== Schedule ==
All times are Eastern Standard Time (UTC-3).

Date	Time	Round
July 11, 2015	9:55	Heat 1
July 11, 2015	10:05	Heat 2
July 11, 2015	14:25	Repechage
July 14, 2015	9:25	Final B
July 14, 2015	10:05	Final A

== Results ==
=== Heats ===
==== Heat 1 ====
Rank	Rowers	Country	Time	Notes
1	Colin Ethridge; Austin Meyer	United States	6:31.53	FA
2	Alan Armenta; Alexis López	Mexico	6:32.59	FA
3	Saul Garcia; Mark Henry	Canada	6:45.47	R
4	Luis Ollarves Mota; Luis Graterol Loyo	Venezuela	7:11.39	R
5	Gunther Slowing Rossil; Juan Guevara Gonzalez	Guatemala	7:17.52	R

==== Heat 2 ====
Rank	Rowers	Country	Time	Notes
1	Raúl Hernández; Liosbel Hernandez	Cuba	6:45.83	FA
2	Andres Oyarzun; Bernardo Guerrero	Chile	6:48.14	FA
3	Rodolfo Collazo; Bruno Cetraro Berriolo	Uruguay	6:54.62	R
4	Thiago Pereira Carvalho; Ailson Eráclito	Brazil	6:59.00	R

=== Repechage ===
Rank	Rowers	Country	Time	Notes
1	Saul Garcia; Mark Henry	Canada	6:54.11	FA
2	Rodolfo Collazo; Bruno Cetraro Berriolo	Uruguay	6:57.63	FA
3	Thiago Pereira Carvalho; Ailson Eráclito	Brazil	7:04.57	FB
4	Luis Ollarves Mota; Luis Graterol Loyo	Venezuela	7:06.92	FB
5	Gunther Slowing Rossil; Juan Guevara Gonzalez	Guatemala	7:10.91	FB

=== Finals ===
==== Final B ====
Rank	Rowers	Country	Time	Notes
7	Thiago Pereira Carvalho; Ailson Eráclito	Brazil	6:36.24	
8	Luis Ollarves Mota; Luis Graterol Loyo	Venezuela	6:38.18	
9	Gunther Slowing Rossil; Juan Guevara Gonzalez	Guatemala	6:39.40	

==== Final A ====
Rank	Rowers	Country	Time	Notes
1st place, gold medalist(s)	Alan Armenta; Alexis López	Mexico	6:15.65	
2nd place, silver medalist(s)	Colin Ethridge; Austin Meyer	United States	6:17.34	
3rd place, bronze medalist(s)	Raúl Hernández; Liosbel Hernandez	Cuba	6:24.88	
4	Andres Oyarzun; Bernardo Guerrero	Chile	6:29.52	
5	Saul Garcia; Mark Henry	Canada	6:31.75	
6	Rodolfo Collazo; Bruno Cetraro Berriolo	Uruguay	6:32.21	
