= Rowing at the 2015 Pan American Games – Men's quadruple sculls =

Rowing – Men's quadruple sculls at the 2015 Pan American Games
- Venue: Royal Canadian Henley Rowing Course
- Dates: July 12 - July 14
- Competitors: 24 from 6 nations
- Winning time: 5:42.22

Medalists
| Gold medal | Matthew Buie; Julien Bahain; Will Dean; Rob Gibson | Canada |
| Silver medal | Adrian Oquendo; Orlando Sotolongo; Eduardo Rubio; Ángel Fournier | Cuba |
| Bronze medal | Brian Rosso; Osvaldo Suárez; Rodrigo Murillo; Cristian Rosso | Argentina |

The men's quadruple sculls rowing event at the 2015 Pan American Games was held from July 12–14 at the Royal Canadian Henley Rowing Course in St. Catharines.

== Schedule ==
All times are Eastern Standard Time (UTC-3).

| Date | Time | Round |
|---|---|---|
| July 12, 2015 | 10:05 | Heat |
| July 14, 2015 | 10:45 | Final |

== Results ==
=== Heat ===
| Rank | Rowers | Country | Time | Notes |
|---|---|---|---|---|
| 1 | Matthew Buie; Julien Bahain; Will Dean; Rob Gibson | Canada | 5:52.21 | F |
| 2 | Adrian Oquendo; Orlando Sotolongo; Eduardo Rubio; Ángel Fournier | Cuba | 6:02.29 | F |
| 3 | Colin Ethridge; Sam Stitt; Ryan Monaghan; Austin Meyer | United States | 6:11.44 | F |
| 4 | Juan Jiménez; Miguel Carballo; Juan Cabrera; Juan Flores | Mexico | 6:11.95 | F |
| 5 | Gerardo Campa Roche; Jorge Chiquin Pineda; Juan Bojorquez Galvez; Leif Catalan Flores | Guatemala | 6:13.10 | F |
| 6 | Brian Rosso; Osvaldo Suárez; Rodrigo Murillo; Cristian Rosso | Argentina | 6:50.34 | F |

=== Final ===
| Rank | Rowers | Country | Time | Notes |
|---|---|---|---|---|
| 1st place, gold medalist(s) | Matthew Buie; Julien Bahain; Will Dean; Rob Gibson | Canada | 5:42.22 | |
| 2nd place, silver medalist(s) | Adrian Oquendo; Orlando Sotolongo; Eduardo Rubio; Ángel Fournier | Cuba | 5:44.39 | |
| 3rd place, bronze medalist(s) | Brian Rosso; Osvaldo Suárez; Rodrigo Murillo; Cristian Rosso | Argentina | 5:47.14 | |
| 4 | Juan Jiménez; Miguel Carballo; Juan Cabrera; Juan Flores | Mexico | 5:48.37 | |
| 5 | Colin Ethridge; Sam Stitt; Ryan Monaghan; Austin Meyer | United States | 6:05.02 | |
| 6 | Gerardo Campa Roche; Jorge Chiquin Pineda; Juan Bojorquez Galvez; Leif Catalan Flores | Guatemala | 6:12.87 | |
