= Rowing at the 2014 Central American and Caribbean Games =

- Venue: Mandinga Lagoon
- Location: Veracruz, Mexico
- Dates: 25-29 November

The rowing competition at the 2014 Central American and Caribbean Games was held in Veracruz, Mexico.

The tournament was scheduled to be held from 25–29 November at the Mandinga Lagoon.

== Medal summary ==
=== Men's events ===
Event	Gold		Silver		Bronze	
Single Sculls	Ángel Fournier (CUB)	6:13.49	Juan Carlos Cabrera (MEX)	6:18.30	Emilio Torres (VEN)	6:27.79
Double Sculls	Cuba (CUB); Ángel Fournier; Eduardo Rubio	5:45.42	Mexico (MEX); Patrick Loliger; Alan Armenta	5:50.19	Venezuela (VEN); Jackson Vicent; Jose Guipe	6:05.13
Coxless pair	Cuba (CUB); Solaris Freire; Adrian Oquendo	6:05.06	Mexico (MEX); Leopoldo Tejada; Diego Sancehz	6:06.31	Venezuela (VEN); Wilfredo Villa; Jaime Machado	6:18.51
Lightweight Double Sculls	Cuba (CUB); Liosbel Hernandez; Raul Hernandez	5:57.52	Mexico (MEX); Salvador Ramirez; Edgar Valenzuela	5:58.53	Venezuela (VEN); Jackson Vicent; Jose Guipe	6:12.65
Quadruple sculls	Cuba (CUB); Ángel Fournier; Janier Concepción; Orlando Sotolongo; Eduardo Rubio	5:31.31	Mexico (MEX); Juan Francisco Jiménez; Juan Carlos Cabrera; Alan Armenta; Patrick Loliger	5:34.01	Venezuela (VEN); James Abou; Emillio Torres; Jackson Vicent; Jose Guipe	5:39.91
Coxless four	Cuba (CUB); Solaris Freire; Adrian Oquendo; Janier Concepción; Jorber Avila	5:45.10	Mexico (MEX); Leopoldo Tejada; Hugo Carpio; Jose Alberto Arriaga; Diego Sanchez	5:50.91	Venezuela (VEN); Marcos Diaz; Jaime Machado; Wilfredo Villa; Augstin Betancourt	6:05.94
Lightweight Coxless Four	Cuba (CUB); Wilber Turro; Liosbel Hernandez; Liosmel Ramos; Raul Hernandez	5:47.82	Venezuela (VEN); Luis Ollarves; Andre Mora; Luis Graterol; Agustin Betancourt	5:49.14	Mexico (MEX); Jose Alberto Arriaga; Omar Tejada; Omar Lopez; Hugo Carpio	5:50.52

=== Women's events ===
Event	Gold		Silver		Bronze	
Single Sculls	Yariulvis Cobas (CUB)	7:10.68	Jenesis Perez (VEN)	7:13.46	Lilia Perez Rul (MEX)	7:23.13
Double Sculls	Cuba (CUB); Yariulvis Cobas; Aimee Hernandez	6:20.33	Mexico (MEX); Fabiola Nunez; Itzama Medina	6:27.34	Venezuela (VEN); Keila Garcia; Kimberlin Meneses	6:30.07
Lightweight Double Sculls	Cuba (CUB); Licet Hernandez; Yislena Hernandez	6:54.97	Venezuela (VEN); Jenesis Perez; Kimberlin Meneses	6:57.05	Mexico (MEX); Analicia Ramirez; Guadalupe Garcia	7:01.67

== Medal table ==
* Host nation (Mexico)

Rank	Nation	Gold	Silver	Bronze	Total
1	Cuba	10	0	0	10
2	Mexico*	0	7	3	10
3	Venezuela	0	3	7	10
Totals (3 entries)		10	10	10	30
