= 2024 World Rowing Championships – Men's lightweight quadruple sculls =

Men's lightweight quadruple sculls at the 2024 World Rowing Championships
- Venue: Royal Canadian Henley Rowing Course
- Location: St. Catharines, Canada
- Dates: 20–24 August
- Competitors: 16 from 4 nations
- Teams: 4
- Winning time: 5:47.39

Medalists
gold medal	José Navarro; Marco Velazquez; Miguel Carballo; Rafael Mejia	Mexico
silver medal	James McCullough; Casey Howshall; Ian Richardson; Jasper Liu	United States
bronze medal	Tim Streib; Moritz Marchart; Fabio Kress; Joachim Agne	Germany

The men's lightweight quadruple sculls competition at the 2024 World Rowing Championships took place in St. Catharines between 20 and 24 August 2024.

== Schedule ==
The schedule was as follows:

Date	Time	Round
Tuesday 20 August 2024	09:45	Preliminary race
Saturday 24 August 2024	15:49	Final

All times are Eastern Daylight Time (UTC−4)

== Results ==
=== Preliminary round ===
All boats advanced to the final.

Rank	Rower	Country	Time	Notes
1	Tim Streib; Moritz Marchart; Fabio Kress; Joachim Agne	Germany	6:33.48	F
2	José Navarro; Marco Velazquez; Miguel Carballo; Rafael Mejia	Mexico	6:36.96	F
3	James McCullough; Casey Howshall; Ian Richardson; Jasper Liu	United States	6:39.50	F
4	Magnus Oddershede; Rasmus Lind; Johan Poulsen; Marcus Lyngesen	Denmark	6:44.56	F

=== Final ===
The final took place at 15:49 on 24 August.

Rank	Rower	Country	Time	Notes
1st place, gold medalist(s)	José Navarro; Marco Velazquez; Miguel Carballo; Rafael Mejia	Mexico	5:47.39	
2nd place, silver medalist(s)	James McCullough; Casey Howshall; Ian Richardson; Jasper Liu	United States	5:47.74	
3rd place, bronze medalist(s)	Tim Streib; Moritz Marchart; Fabio Kress; Joachim Agne	Germany	5:50.52	
4	Magnus Oddershede; Rasmus Lind; Johan Poulsen; Marcus Lyngesen	Denmark	6:01.17	
