= Rowing at the 2015 Pan American Games – Women's single sculls =

Rowing – Women's single sculls at the 2015 Pan American Games
- Venue: Royal Canadian Henley Rowing Course
- Dates: July 12–14, 2015
- Competitors: 8 from 8 nations
- Winning time Final A: 7:30.86

Medalists
Gold medal	Carling Zeeman	Canada
Silver medal	Katherine McFetridge	United States
Bronze medal	Soraya Jadue	Chile

The women's single sculls rowing event at the 2015 Pan American Games was held from July 12–14, 2015 at the Royal Canadian Henley Rowing Course in St. Catharines.

== Schedule ==
All times are Eastern Standard Time (UTC-3).

Date	Time	Round
July 12, 2015	9:25	Heat 1
July 12, 2015	9:35	Heat 2
July 12, 2015	14:15	Repechage
July 14, 2015	9:05	Final B
July 14, 2015	9:35	Final A

== Results ==
=== Heats ===
==== Heat 1 ====
Rank	Rowers	Country	Time	Notes
1	Katherine McFetridge	United States	7:56.38	FA
2	Sofia Conte	Argentina	8:20.75	R
3	Reyes Salazar	Venezuela	8:26.89	R
4	Jessica Hernandez	El Salvador	8:28.06	R

==== Heat 2 ====
Rank	Rowers	Country	Time	Notes
1	Carling Zeeman	Canada	7:43.27	FA
2	Soraya Jadue	Chile	8:01.61	R
3	Yariulvis Cobas	Cuba	8:02.67	R
4	Alejandra Alonso	Paraguay	8:02.95	R

=== Repechage ===
Rank	Rowers	Country	Time	Notes
1	Soraya Jadue	Chile	8:37.60	FA
2	Alejandra Alonso	Paraguay	8:42.41	FA
3	Yariulvis Cobas	Cuba	8:43.73	FA
4	Sofia Conte	Argentina	8:51.40	FA
5	Jessica Hernandez	El Salvador	9:04.26	FB
6	Reyes Salazar	Venezuela	9:25.48	FB

=== Finals ===
==== Final B ====
Rank	Rowers	Country	Time	Notes
7	Jessica Hernandez	El Salvador	8:08.68	
8	Reyes Salazar	Venezuela	8:18.52	

==== Final A ====
Rank	Rowers	Country	Time	Notes
1st place, gold medalist(s)	Carling Zeeman	Canada	7:30.86	
2nd place, silver medalist(s)	Katherine McFetridge	United States	7:38.21	
3rd place, bronze medalist(s)	Soraya Jadue	Chile	7:43.34	
4	Yariulvis Cobas	Cuba	7:46.21	
5	Sofia Conte	Argentina	7:52.61	
6	Alejandra Alonso	Paraguay	7:57.05	
