= Rowing at the 2015 Pan American Games – Men's lightweight coxless four =

Rowing – Men's lightweight coxless four at the 2015 Pan American Games
- Venue: Royal Canadian Henley Rowing Course
- Dates: July 12 – July 15
- Competitors: 28 from 7 nations
- Winning time: 6:42.40

Medalists
Gold medal	Maxwell Lattimer; Brendan Hodge; Nicolas Pratt; Eric Woelfl	Canada
Silver medal	Robin Prendes; Peter Gibson; Andrew Weiland; Matthew O'Donoghue	United States
Bronze medal	Andres Oyarzun; Luis Saumann Salas; Felipe Cardenas; Bernardo Guerrero	Chile

The men's lightweight coxless four rowing event at the 2015 Pan American Games was held from July 12–15 at the Royal Canadian Henley Rowing Course in St. Catharines.

== Schedule ==
All times are Eastern Standard Time (UTC-3).

Date	Time	Round
July 12, 2015	9:05	Heat 1
July 12, 2015	9:15	Heat 2
July 12, 2015	14:05	Repechage
July 15, 2015	9:35	Final

== Results ==
=== Heats ===
==== Heat 1 ====
Rank	Rowers	Country	Time	Notes
1	Alejandro Colomino; Nicolai Fernandez; Carlo Lauro; Pablo Aguirre	Argentina	6:02.74	F
2	Maximo Arango; Liosmel Ramos; Liosbel Hernandez; Raúl Hernández	Cuba	6:17.95	R
3	Klaus Rasmussen; Hugo Carpio; Jose Arriaga; Omar Lopez	Mexico	6:23.58	R
4	Thiago Almeida; Renato Cesar Cataldo Felizardo; David Faria De Souza; Guilherme Ricardo Gomes	Brazil	6:28.14	R

==== Heat 2 ====
Rank	Rowers	Country	Time	Notes
1	Robin Prendes; Peter Gibson; Andrew Weiland; Matthew O'Donoghue	United States	6:00.25	F
2	Maxwell Lattimer; Brendan Hodge; Nicolas Pratt; Eric Woelfl	Canada	6:09.58	R
3	Andres Oyarzun; Luis Saumann Salas; Felipe Cardenas; Bernardo Guerrero	Chile	6:44.22	R

=== Repechage ===
Rank	Rowers	Country	Time	Notes
1	Maxwell Lattimer; Brendan Hodge; Nicolas Pratt; Eric Woelfl	Canada	6:29.10	F
2	Klaus Rasmussen; Hugo Carpio; Jose Arriaga; Omar Lopez	Mexico	6:35.77	F
3	Andres Oyarzun; Luis Saumann Salas; Felipe Cardenas; Bernardo Guerrero	Chile	6:41.74	F
4	Maximo Arango; Liosmel Ramos; Liosbel Hernandez; Raúl Hernández	Cuba	6:54.23	F
5	Thiago Almeida; Renato Cesar Cataldo Felizardo; David Faria De Souza; Guilherme Ricardo Gomes	Brazil	7:00.67	

=== Final ===
Rank	Rowers	Country	Time	Notes
1st place, gold medalist(s)	Maxwell Lattimer; Brendan Hodge; Nicolas Pratt; Eric Woelfl	Canada	6:42.40	
2nd place, silver medalist(s)	Robin Prendes; Peter Gibson; Andrew Weiland; Matthew O'Donoghue	United States	6:46.56	
3rd place, bronze medalist(s)	Andres Oyarzun; Luis Saumann Salas; Felipe Cardenas; Bernardo Guerrero	Chile	6:47.89	
4	Alejandro Colomino; Nicolai Fernandez; Carlo Lauro; Pablo Aguirre	Argentina	6:56.27	
5	Klaus Rasmussen; Hugo Carpio; Jose Arriaga; Omar Lopez	Mexico	6:58.32	
