= 2024 World Rowing Championships – PR3 Men's coxless pair =

PR3 Men's coxless pair at the 2024 World Rowing Championships
- Venue: Royal Canadian Henley Rowing Course
- Location: St. Catharines, Canada
- Dates: 20–24 August
- Competitors: 2 from 2 nations

Medalists
gold medal	Luca Conti; Igor Zappa	Italy

The PR3 men's coxless pair competition at the 2024 World Rowing Championships took place in St. Catharines between 20 and 24 August 2024.

== Schedule ==
The schedule was as follows:

Date	Time	Round
Tuesday 20 August 2024	09:30	Preliminary race
Saturday 24 August 2024	14:30	Final

All times are Eastern Daylight Time (UTC-4)

== Results ==
All boats advanced directly to final.

=== Heat ===
Rank	Rower	Country	Time	Notes
1	Luca Conti; Igor Zappa	Italy	8:26.81	F
2	Toshihiro Nishioka; Yuta Sakaguchi	Japan	9:05.35	F

=== Final ===
Rank	Rower	Country	Time
1st place, gold medalist(s)	Luca Conti; Igor Zappa	Italy	7:29.26
2	Toshihiro Nishioka; Yuta Sakaguchi	Japan	7:57.19
