= Guregian =

Guregian is a surname. Notable people with this surname include:

- Katelin Guregian (born 1987), American Olympic rower
- Nareg Guregian (born 1989), American Olympic rower
