= Wrestling at the 2015 Pan American Games – Men's Greco-Roman 66 kg =

Men's Greco-Roman 66 kg at the 2015 Pan American Games
- Venue: Mississauga Sports Centre
- Dates: July 15
- Competitors: 8 from 8 nations

Medalists
Gold medal	Wuileixis Rivas	Venezuela
Silver medal	Bryce Saddoris	United States
Bronze medal	Miguel Martínez	Cuba
Bronze medal	Mario Molina	Peru

The Men's Greco-Roman 66 kg competition of the Wrestling events at the 2015 Pan American Games in Toronto were held on July 15 at the Mississauga Sports Centre.

== Schedule ==
All times are Eastern Daylight Time (UTC-4).

Date	Time	Round
July 15, 2015	14:53	Quarterfinals
July 15, 2015	15:20	Semifinals
July 15, 2015	20:32	Bronze medal matches
July 15, 2015	20:50	Final

== Results ==
Legend

- C — Won by 3 cautions given to the opponent
- R — Retired

=== Final ===
Quarterfinals		Semifinals		Finals
Bernardo Cardenas (MEX)	4
Miguel Martínez (CUB)	13	Miguel Martínez (CUB)	1
Alexis Cuero (COL)	0	Wuileixis Rivas (VEN)	2
Wuileixis Rivas (VEN)	8			Wuileixis Rivas (VEN)	13
Mario Molina (PER)	0			Bryce Saddoris (USA)	1
Bryce Saddoris (USA)	3	Bryce Saddoris (USA)	8
Jefrin Mejia (HON)	10	Jefrin Mejia (HON)	0
Enrique Guallpa (ECU)	2

=== Repechage ===
Bronze medal match
Alexis Cuero (COL)	0^{R}
Miguel Martínez (CUB)	6
Mario Molina (PER)	9^{C}
Jefrin Mejia (HON)	4
