= Rowing at the 2015 Pan American Games – Men's coxless pair =

Rowing – Men's coxless pair at the 2015 Pan American Games
- Venue: Royal Canadian Henley Rowing Course
- Dates: July 12 - July 14
- Competitors: 14 from 7 nations
- Winning time: 6:27.77

Medalists
Gold medal	Axel Haack; Diego López	Argentina
Gold medal	Félipe Leal; Oscar Vasquez	Chile
Bronze medal	Diego Sanchez; Leopoldo Tejeda	Mexico

The men's coxless pair rowing event at the 2015 Pan American Games was held from July 12–14 at the Royal Canadian Henley Rowing Course in St. Catharines.

== Schedule ==
All times are Eastern Standard Time (UTC-3).

Date	Time	Round
July 12, 2015	9:45	Heat 1
July 12, 2015	9:55	Heat 2
July 12, 2015	14:25	Repechage
July 14, 2015	10:25	Final

== Results ==
=== Heats ===
==== Heat 1 ====
Rank	Rowers	Country	Time	Notes
1	Félipe Leal; Oscar Vasquez	Chile	6:36.21	F
2	Martin Barakso; Mike Evans	Canada	6:39.61	R
3	Matthew Mahon; Brendan Harrington	United States	6:40.66	R
4	Axel Haack; Diego López	Argentina	6:52.30	R

==== Heat 2 ====
Rank	Rowers	Country	Time	Notes
1	Diego Sanchez; Leopoldo Tejeda	Mexico	6:42.95	F
2	Vinicios Delazeri; Victor Ruzicki Pereira	Brazil	6:48.76	R
3	Janier Concepción; Solaris Freire	Cuba	7:22.82	R

=== Repechage ===
Rank	Rowers	Country	Time	Notes
1	Martin Barakso; Mike Evans	Canada	7:08.38	F
2	Vinicios Delazeri; Victor Ruzicki Pereira	Brazil	7:11.29	F
3	Matthew Mahon; Brendan Harrington	United States	7:11.41	F
4	Axel Haack; Diego López	Argentina	7:12.44	F
5	Janier Concepción; Solaris Freire	Cuba	7:19.34	

=== Final ===
Rank	Rowers	Country	Time	Notes
1st place, gold medalist(s)	Axel Haack; Diego López	Argentina	6:27.77	
1st place, gold medalist(s)	Félipe Leal; Oscar Vasquez	Chile	6:27.77	
3rd place, bronze medalist(s)	Diego Sanchez; Leopoldo Tejeda	Mexico	6:33.52	
4	Vinicios Delazeri; Victor Ruzicki Pereira	Brazil	6:38.96	
5	Martin Barakso; Mike Evans	Canada	6:38.99	
6	Matthew Mahon; Brendan Harrington	United States	6:39.77	
