= Will Dean (rower) =

Canadian rower (born 1987)

Personal information
- Nationality: Canada
- Born: June 10, 1987 (age 39) Kelowna, British Columbia
- Height: 195 cm (6 ft 5 in)
- Weight: 95 kg (209 lb)
Medal record
Men's rowing
Representing Canada
Pan American Games
Gold medal – first place	2015 Toronto	Quadruple sculls
Gold medal – first place	2015 Toronto	Eight

Will Dean (born June 10, 1987) is a Canadian rower. He won two gold medal at the 2015 Pan American Games in the men's quadruple sculls and men's eight events.

He was part of the Canadian men's four who reached the B final at the 2012 Summer Olympics.

In 2016, Dean qualified for the 2016 Summer Olympics as a member of the Canadian quadruple sculls crew after they finished in second place (and last qualifying position) at the last chance qualification event in Lausanne, Switzerland. The second place finish was upgraded to first following the disqualification of the Russian team due to a failed drug test. At the 2016 Olympics, the Canadian quadruple sculls crew finished 8th.
