= Karate at the 2015 Pan American Games – Women's +68 kg =

Women's +68 kg at the 2015 Pan American Games
- Venue: Mississauga Sports Centre
- Dates: July 25
- Competitors: 8 from 8 nations

Medalists
Gold medal	Valeria Echever	Ecuador
Silver medal	Camélie Boisvenue	Canada
Bronze medal	Yeisy Pina Ordaz	Venezuela
Bronze medal	Isabela dos Santos	Brazil

The women's +68 kg competition of the karate events at the 2015 Pan American Games in Toronto, Ontario, Canada, was held on July 25 at the Mississauga Sports Centre.

Valeria Echever of Ecuador won the gold medal, defeating Canadian Camélie Boisvenue in the gold medal match.

== Schedule ==
All times are Central Standard Time (UTC-6).

Date	Time	Round
July 25, 2015	15:05	Pool matches
July 25, 2015	20:33	Semifinals
July 25, 2015	21:27	Final

== Results ==
The final results.

Legend

- KK — Forfeit (Kiken)

=== Pool 1 ===
Athlete	Nation	Pld	W	D	L	Points		
Athlete	Nation	Pld	W	D	L	GF	GA	Diff
Camélie Boisvenue	Canada	3	2	1	0	13	6	+7
Isabela dos Santos	Brazil	3	2	0	1	8	4	+4
Karina Pérez	Dominican Republic	3	1	0	2	7	16	-9
Cirelys Martinez	Cuba	3	0	1	2	8	10	-2

	Score	
Camélie Boisvenue (CAN)	4–4	Cirelys Martinez (CUB)
Karina Pérez (DOM)	0–7	Isabela dos Santos (BRA)
Camélie Boisvenue (CAN)	5–2	Karina Pérez (DOM)
Cirelys Martinez (CUB)	0–1	Isabela dos Santos (BRA)
Camélie Boisvenue (CAN)	4–0	Isabela dos Santos (BRA)
Cirelys Martinez (CUB)	4–5	Karina Pérez (DOM)

=== Pool 2 ===
Athlete	Nation	Pld	W	D	L	Points		
Athlete	Nation	Pld	W	D	L	GF	GA	Diff
Valeria Echever	Ecuador	3	3	0	0	15	3	+12
Yeisy Pina Ordaz	Venezuela	3	2	0	1	9	4	+5
Guadalupe Quintal	Mexico	3	1	0	2	7	12	-5
Veronica Lugo	Argentina	3	0	0	3	1	13	-12

	Score	
Guadalupe Quintal (MEX)	0–4	Yeisy Pina Ordaz (VEN)
Veronica Lugo (ARG)	1–3	Valeria Echever (ECU)
Guadalupe Quintal (MEX)	7–0	Veronica Lugo (ARG)
Yeisy Pina Ordaz (VEN)	2–4	Valeria Echever (ECU)
Guadalupe Quintal (MEX)	0–8	Valeria Echever (ECU)
Yeisy Pina Ordaz (VEN)	3–0	Veronica Lugo (ARG)

=== Finals ===
Semifinals
Camélie Boisvenue (CAN)	1
Yeisy Pina Ordaz (VEN)	1
Isabela dos Santos (BRA)	1
Valeria Echever (ECU)	5

Gold medal match
Camélie Boisvenue (CAN)	2
Valeria Echever (ECU)	3
