= Fencing at the 2015 Pan American Games – Women's team sabre =

Women's team sabre at the 2015 Pan American Games
- Venue: Toronto Pan Am Sports Centre
- Dates: July 23
- Competitors: 24 from 8 nations

Medalists
Gold medal	Ibtihaj Muhammad; Mariel Zagunis; Dagmara Wozniak	United States
Silver medal	Úrsula González; Paola Pliego; Julieta Toledo	Mexico
Bronze medal	Alejandra Benítez; Milagros Pastran; Shia Rodriguez	Venezuela

The women's team sabre competition of the fencing events at the 2015 Pan American Games was held on July 23 at the Toronto Pan Am Sports Centre.

The team sabre competition consisted of a three-round single-elimination bracket with a bronze medal match between the two semifinal losers and classification semifinals and finals for 5th to 8th places. Teams consist of three members each. Matches consist of nine bouts, with every fencer on one team facing each fencer on the other team. Scoring carried over between bouts with a total of 45 touches being the team goal. Bouts lasted until one team reached the target multiple of 5 touches. For example, if the first bout ended with a score of 5–3, that score would remain into the next bout and the second bout would last until one team reached 10 touches. Bouts also had a maximum time of three minutes each; if the final bout ended before either team reached 45 touches, the team leading at that point won. A tie at that point would result in an additional one-minute sudden-death time period. This sudden-death period was further modified by the selection of a draw-winner beforehand; if neither fencer scored a touch during the minute, the predetermined draw-winner won the bout.

== Schedule ==
All times are Eastern Daylight Time (UTC-4).

Date	Time	Round
July 23, 2015	9:05	Quarterfinals
July 23, 2015	10:15	Fifth to eighth
July 23, 2015	11:25	Semifinals
July 23, 2015	17:05	Bronze medal match
July 23, 2015	19:05	Final

== Results ==
The following are the results of the event.

Quarterfinals
1	United States	45
8	El Salvador	25
5	Cuba	45
4	Canada	39
3	Venezuela	45
6	Dominican Republic	36
7	Brazil	27
2	Mexico	45

Semifinals
1	United States	45
5	Cuba	33
3	Venezuela	36
2	Mexico	45

Final
1	United States	45
2	Mexico	31
Third place
5	Cuba	38
3	Venezuela	45

=== Classification 5 – 8 ===
Classification
8	El Salvador	32
4	Canada	45
6	Dominican Republic	41
7	Brazil	45

Fifth place
4	Canada	45
7	Brazil	38
Seventh place
8	El Salvador	29
6	Dominican Republic	45

== Final classification ==
Rank	Team	Athlete
1st place, gold medalist(s)	United States	Ibtihaj Muhammad; Mariel Zagunis; Dagmara Wozniak
2nd place, silver medalist(s)	Mexico	Úrsula González; Paola Pliego; Julieta Toledo
3rd place, bronze medalist(s)	Venezuela	Alejandra Benítez; Milagros Pastran; Shia Rodriguez
4	Cuba	Yaritza Goulet; Jennifer Morales; Darlin Robert
5	Canada	Pamela Brind’Amour; Gabriella Page; Marissa Ponich
6	Brazil	Marta Baeza Centurion; Giulia Gasparin; Karina Lakerbai
7	Dominican Republic	Rossy Félix; Maybelline Johnnson; Heyydys Ysabel
8	El Salvador	Madeline Hernandez Elias; Alba Marroquin Castañeda; Fatima Tobar
