= Nicolas Pratt =

Canadian rower

Personal information
- Nationality: Canada
- Born: July 10, 1985 (age 40) Bergen, Norway
- Height: 183 cm (6 ft 0 in)
- Weight: 72 kg (159 lb)
Medal record
Men's rowing
Representing Canada
Pan American Games
Gold medal – first place	2015 Toronto	Men's lightweight four

Nicolas Pratt (born July 10, 1985) is a Canadian rower. He won a gold medal at the 2015 Pan American Games in the men's lightweight coxless four event.

In June 2016, he was officially named to Canada's 2016 Olympic team.
