= Tim Schrijver =

Canadian rower

Personal information
- Nationality: Canada
- Born: February 7, 1992 (age 34) Strathroy-Caradoc, Ontario
- Height: 203 cm (6 ft 8 in)
- Weight: 103 kg (227 lb)
Medal record
Men's rowing
Representing Canada
Pan American Games
Gold medal – first place	2015 Toronto	Men's coxless four
Gold medal – first place	2015 Toronto	Men's eights
World Rowing U23 Championships
Gold medal – first place	2014 Varese	Men's coxed fours

Tim Schrijver (born February 7, 1992) is a Canadian rower. He won two gold medals at the 2015 Pan American Games.

In June 2016, he was officially named to Canada's 2016 Olympic team.
