= Brendan Hodge =

Canadian rower (born 1984)

Personal information
- Nationality: Canada
- Born: December 31, 1984 (age 41) Vancouver, British Columbia
- Height: 187 cm (6 ft 2 in)
- Weight: 73 kg (161 lb)
Medal record
Men's rowing
Representing Canada
Pan American Games
Gold medal – first place	2015 Toronto	Men's lightweight four

Brendan Hodge (born December 31, 1984) is a Canadian rower. He won a gold medal at the 2015 Pan American Games in the men's lightweight coxless four event.

In June 2016, he was officially named to Canada's 2016 Olympic team.

He graduated from Harvard College in 2007 and in 2010, he graduated from the Peter A. Allard School of Law at the University of British Columbia.
