= Kai Langerfeld =

Canadian rower (born 1987)

Personal information
- Nationality: Canada
- Born: July 5, 1987 (age 38) North Vancouver, British Columbia
- Height: 197 cm (6 ft 6 in)
- Weight: 95 kg (209 lb)
Medal record
Men's rowing
Representing Canada
Pan American Games
Gold medal – first place	2015 Toronto	Men's coxless four
Gold medal – first place	2015 Toronto	Men's eights
Silver medal – second place	2011 Guadalajara	Men's coxless four
Silver medal – second place	2011 Guadalajara	Men's eights
World Championships
Bronze medal – third place	2012 Plovdiv	Men's coxed pair

Kai Langerfeld (born July 5, 1987) is a Canadian rower. He won two gold medals at the 2015 Pan American Games.

In 2016, Kai competed on Canada's 2016 Olympic team in the Coxless Four which placed 6th overall.

He represented Canada at the 2020 Summer Olympics.

His father, York Langerfeld, competed at the 1976 Summer Olympics.
