= Katherine McFetridge =

American rower (born 1989)

Personal information
- Born: January 17, 1989 (age 37) Washington Township, New Jersey, United States
- Home town: Thorofare, New Jersey, United States

Sport
- Country: United States of America
- Sport: Rowing
Medal record
Representing the United States
Pan American Games
| Silver medal – second place | 2015 Toronto | W1x |

Katherine McFetridge (born January 17, 1989) is an American rower. She won a silver medal in the women's single sculls at the 2015 Pan American Games.
