= Julien Bahain =

French-Canadian Olympic rower

Personal information
- Born: 20 April 1986 (age 40) Angers, France

Sport
- Sport: Rowing
Medal record
Men's rowing
Representing Canada
Pan American Games
Gold medal – first place	2015 Toronto	M4x
Gold medal – first place	2015 Toronto	M8+
Representing France
Olympic Games
Bronze medal – third place	2008 Beijing	M4x
World Championships
Silver medal – second place	2007 Munich	M4x
Silver medal – second place	2009 Poznan	M2x
Bronze medal – third place	2010 Hamilton	M2x
Bronze medal – third place	2011 Bled	M2x
European Championships
Gold medal – first place	2008 Marathon	M2x
Gold medal – first place	2010 Montemor-o-Velho	M2x
Mediterranean Games
Gold medal – first place	2009 Pescara	M2x

Julien Bruno Paul Bahain (born 20 April 1986) is a rower of French/Canadian origin. He competed at the 2008 Summer Olympics, where he won a bronze medal in the quadruple sculls with Jonathan Coeffic, Pierre-Jean Peltier and Cédric Berrest. In 2014, he decided to retire from the French rowing team to row for Canada.

In 2013, he rowed across the Atlantic Ocean with Patrick Favre. It took them 49 days to row from Tarfaya (Morocco) to Tartane (Martinique).

In June 2016, he was officially named to Canada's 2016 Olympic team.
