= Robin Prendes =

American rower (born 1988)

Personal information
- Nationality: American
- Born: December 13, 1988 (age 37) Matanzas, Cuba
- Height: 6 ft 1 in (185 cm)
- Weight: 155 lb (70 kg)

Sport
- Sport: Rowing
- Event: Lightweight Men's 4+
- Club: US Rowing Training Center – Oklahoma City
- Team: Pan America

Achievements and titles
- Olympic finals: London 2012, Rio 2016
Medal record
Men's rowing
Representing United States
Pan American Games
Silver medal – second place	2015 Toronto	Lwt coxless four

Robin Prendes (born December 13, 1988) is an American rower. He competed in the Men's lightweight coxless four event at the 2012 Summer Olympics. The team finished in 8th. At the 2014 World Championships, the US men's lightweight four boat that Prendes rowed in finished in 10th.

He also competed in the Men's lightweight coxless four event at the 2016 Summer Olympics. He started to row in 2001.

== See also ==
- List of Princeton University Olympians
