= Agustín Díaz (disambiguation) =

Agustín Hernán Díaz (born 1988) is an Argentine professional footballer

Agustín Díaz may also refer to:

- Agustín Díaz de Mera García Consuegra (born 1947), Spanish politician
- Agustín Díaz Pacheco (born 1952), Spanish writer
- Agustín Díaz Rojas "Coruco" (1935–1961), Mexican footballer, for whom the Estadio Agustín "Coruco" Díaz was named
- Agustín Díaz Yanes (born 1950), Spanish screenwriter and film director
- Augie Diaz (born Agustín Díaz, 1954), American sailor
