= Agustín Díaz Pacheco =

Spanish writer (born 1952)

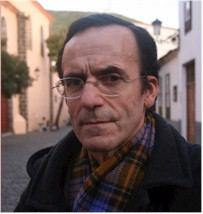
- Born: 1952 (age 73–74); Tenerife
- Occupation: Writer

Agustín Díaz Pacheco (born 1952, in Tenerife) is a Spanish writer. He has received many prizes for his stories and novels. Writer, university graduate as Social Graduate (Labor Relations) and studies of Law. He has written poetry sporadically, appearing on the digital page canariasdigital.org, but has opted for vocational journalism and narrative creation.

His publications include Los nenúfares de piedra, stories, (Ángel Acosta First Prize for Narrative, 1981); La cadena de agua y otros cuentos (1984); El camarote de la memoria (Ángel Guerra Prize for Novel, 1986), edited by Cathedral Editorial (Madrid, 1987) and reedited in the collection Anthology of Canary Literature; La rotura indemne and La red, first prize for unanimity from the Competition of Canary Stories (1986); La mirada de plata, stories, 1991; Proa en nieblas, stories, Ediciones Baile del Sol, 2001 (Tenerife); Breves atajos, stories and short stories, Ediciones Baile del Sol, 2001 (Tenerife), and Línea de naufragio (First Prize for unanimity from the VIII Competition Ateneo de La Laguna-CajaCanarias, 2002), published by Ediciones El Toro de Barro, Madrid/Cuenca, 2003.

His texts appear in four anthologies of Canary Island authors. His novel El camarote de la memoria was selected for the periodical Discoplay (Madrid, 1987), along with works from Salman Rushdie, Malcolm Lowry, Carmen Martín Gaite, Gonzalo Torrente Ballester, Ambrose Bierce and Adolfo Bioy Casares, and for the publication CrónicaLatinoamericana (Londres, 1996); El camarote de la memoria has been studied, like texts from Víctor Doreste, Víctor Ramírez, y J.J.Armas Marcelo, by the professor and essayist El Hadji Amadou Ndoye, who included the novel in his book Estudios sobre narrativa canaria.

His stories have been the object of studies in the curricula of some universities, such as the University of Georgia in the United States. He often contributes to cultural pages, supplements, and opinion articles. His work has been translated into French, Croatian, English, and German.
