= Eric Woelfl =

Canadian rower

Personal information
- Nationality: Canada
- Born: July 18, 1989 (age 36) St. Catharines, Ontario
- Height: 193 cm (6 ft 4 in)
- Weight: 69 kg (152 lb)

Sport
- College team: Brock University
- Club: Ridley Graduate Boat Club
Medal record
Men's rowing
Representing Canada
Pan American Games
Gold medal – first place	2015 Toronto	Men's lightweight four

Eric Woelfl (born July 18, 1989) is a Canadian rower. He won a gold medal at the 2015 Pan American Games in the men's lightweight coxless four event.

In June 2016, he was officially named to Canada's 2016 Olympic team and competed in the Lightweight Men's 4- finishing in 13th place.
