= Samuel Ojserkis =

American rower (born 1990)

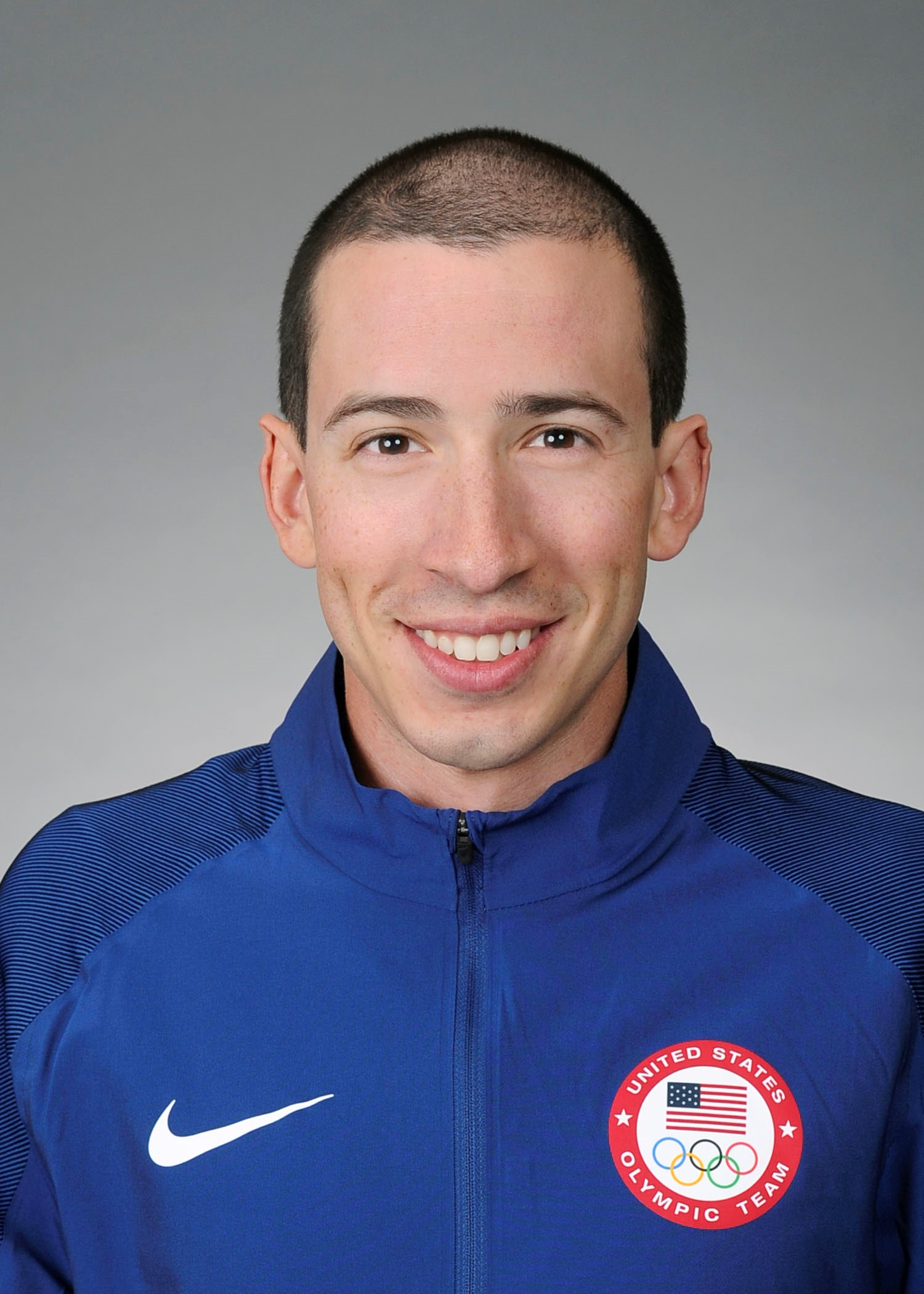

Personal information
- Nationality: American
- Born: Samuel Ojserkis; March 24, 1990 (age 36) Galloway Township, New Jersey
- Height: 172 cm (5.64 ft)
- Weight: 56 kg (123 lb)

Sport
- Country: United States of America
- Sport: Men's rowing
- Event: Eight
- College team: University of Washington; Cambridge University
- Club: USRowing Training Center – Princeton
- Coached by: Lucas McGee
Medal record
Men's rowing
Representing United States
Pan American Games
Bronze medal – third place	2015 Toronto	Eights
World Championships
Gold medal – first place	2012 Lithuania	U23 (Under 23) Eights
World Cup
Bronze medal – third place	2016 Lucerne	Eights
Bronze medal – third place	2015 Varese	Eights

Samuel Ojserkis (born March 24, 1990) is an American rower. He competed in the men's eight event at the 2016 Summer Olympics.

== Biography ==
Samuel Ojserkis was born in the Pomona section of Galloway Township, New Jersey, he grew up in Linwood, New Jersey and graduated from Mainland Regional High School. He earned a degree in geography from the University of Washington in 2012 and a degree in management in 2013 from the University of Cambridge. At the University of Washington, Ojserkis’ crews won 3 National Championships. He was a JV 8+ National Champion in 2010 and won the Varsity 8+ National Championship in 2011 & 2012. At the 2012 National Championship Regatta the UW Varsity 8 set the American Collegiate record of 5 minutes, 21.482. Ojserkis was named to the 2012 1st Team All Pac-12 rowing team his senior year.

Off the water, Ojserkis was awarded for academics. He was named 2012 Pac-12 Scholar-Athlete of the Year. He was also named to the Pac-10 All-Academic Rowing Team in 2010, 2011, and 2012. In 2012, Ojserkis joined Phi Beta Kappa.

After graduating in 2012, Ojserkis coxed the American Under-23 National Team 8+ to a World Championship in Trakai, Lithuania.

At Cambridge, Ojserkis competed in the 2013 BNY Mellon Boat Race as a reserve for Cambridge's Goldie crew. He attended Judge Business School.

On the American Rowing Team, Ojserkis’ highlights included a bronze medal at the 2015 Pan American Games in Toronto, along with 2 Bronze Medals at a 2015 & 2016 World Rowing World Cup. Ojserkis’ last competitive race was the 2016 Olympics in Rio de Janeiro, where he placed 4th.
