= Eduardo Rubio (rower) =

Cuban rower

Personal information
- Born: 13 November 1986 (age 39) Sancti Spíritus, Cuba

Sport
- Sport: Rowing
Medal record
Representing Cuba
Pan American Games
Gold medal – first place	2015 Toronto	Double sculls
Silver medal – second place	2011 Guadalajara	Quadruple sculls
Silver medal – second place	2015 Toronto	Quadruple sculls
Central American and Caribbean Games
Gold medal – first place	2014 Veracruz	Double sculls
Gold medal – first place	2014 Veracruz	Quadruple sculls

Eduardo Rubio Rodríguez (born 13 November 1986) is a Cuban rower. He and Adrián Oquendo placed 13th in the men's double sculls event at the 2016 Summer Olympics.
