= Jessica Hernandez =

Maya and Mexican scientist and activist

Jessica Hernandez is a Maya Ch’orti and Binnizá-Zapotec Indigenous environmental scientist, activist, author, and researcher at the University of Washington. Her work is primarily focused on climate, energy, and environmental justice. She is known for her book, Fresh Banana Leaves: Healing Indigenous Landscapes through Indigenous Science. And is currently putting efforts into rebuilding indigenous communities through her non-profit organization, Earth Daughters.

== Early life and education ==
Hernandez grew up in both South Central Los Angeles, California and southern Mexico. Hernandez's father is from El Salvador and her mother is an indigenous woman from Oaxaca. Growing up, Hernandez's family taught her all about indigenous teachings which significantly influenced her career. In her early life, Hernandez also learned from her grandmother, Maria de Jesus, about the environment and how to tend to it. Maria de Jesus, a member of the Zapotec community in southern Mexico, passed down the rich teachings of indigenous traditions to her granddaughter, shaping her understanding of their ancestral ways. Hernandez's father's experiences during the Salvadoran Civil War, including a story about banana leaves saving his life, inspired her book's title.

Hernandez attended college at the University of Washington, earning her Ph.D. from the School of Environmental and Forest Science in August 2020. During her college career, there were some difficulties in her research due to professors claiming that her work was missing citations or that what she was stating did not have scientific merit. When she started college, she looked forward to sharing what she had learned from her grandmother and father about nature, but her lived experiences and knowledge were dismissed and sometimes mocked by her professors. Hernandez claims that her accounts were from family lived experiences and they have inspired her to bridge the connection between the indigenous way of practice and modern Western practice. In an interview with Hernandez, she mentions that even though she has her Ph.D., she feels that her parents are more knowledgeable about the environment because they have more personal experiences. In that same interview, she discusses how her father was a fisherman. Due to his firsthand experiences with the environment, he possessed a deep understanding of fish and their behavior. These teachings and experiences were passed down to her, leading her to believe that indigenous people do not receive the credit they deserve.

== Career ==
Hernandez started working at the University of Washington as a professor and in a postdoc position beginning 2021. There Hernandez has taught the introduction to climate science where she incorporates indigenous knowledge and perspectives by having her students do restoration projects. Hernandez also provides educational outreach to high school teachers on indigenous teaching methods. Also in 2021, she wrote Fresh Banana Leaves: Healing Indigenous Landscapes Through Indigenous Science which was published on January 18, 2022. The book focuses on changing the perspective on conservation using stories and experiences that Hernandez gathered from her indigenous family and other indigenous people, and combining these experiences with modern science. In 2019, she organized an event to re-introduce indigenous plants in the Bernie White Bear Garden. She also went on to release a podcast episode to share the thoughts of native Seattle community members called “Indigenizing Urban Seattle.” Hernandez is also the founder of Piña Soul, SPC, an organization that funds and supports indigenous projects led by afro-indigenous and indigenous people. Similarly, Hernandez is a presenter involved in the Loka Initiative, an organization that is run by indigenous people who work to center indigenous voices.

Hernandez published her second book, Growing Papaya Trees: Nurturing Indigenous Roots During Climate Displacement, on November 11, 2025.

== Awards and accomplishments ==
While attending the University of Washington in 2015, Hernandez was chosen to be a “Latino/A Scholars Graduate School Fellowship Awardee" from the School of Marine and Environmental Affairs. In 2017, Hernandez was named in the Husky 100 and received the “Outstanding Commitment to Diversity” award from the University of Washington. She also was the first professor at the University of Washington to integrate indigenous teachings into their climate change course. Outside of her accomplishments at the University of Washington, Hernandez was named in the top 100 of Central America’s most powerful women in 2022 by Forbes magazine.

== Peer-reviewed publications ==
- Hernandez, J., Skiba, J., German, M., Scherr, R., Huynh, T., Mathis, C., & Araya, M. (2022). Exploring Sociopolitical Landscapes in Physics Education. Sustainability and Climate Change, 15(4), 279-288.
- Hernandez, J., Meisner, J., Jacobs, L.A., Rabinowitz, P. (2022) Re-Centering Indigenous Knowledge in Climate Change Discourse. PLOS Climate. https://doi.org/10.1371/journal.pclm.0000032
- Hernandez, J., Meisner, J., Bardosh, K., Rabinowitz, P. (2022) Prevent Pandemics and Halt Climate Change? Strengthen Land Rights for Indigenous Peoples. The Lancet Planetary Health. Accepted.
- German, M., Hernandez, J., & Scherr R.E. (2022). Connecting the Science of Water to Students' Communities. The Science Teacher.
- Hernandez, J., Scherr, R., Gorman, M., & Horowitz, R. (2022) Place-based Education in High School Physics: Situating Energy and Climate Change in Students' Communities. Sustainability & Climate Change. https://doi.org/10.1089/scc.2021.0058
- Hernandez, J., Scherr, R., & Robertson, A. D. (2021). Redefining Energy Justice in Physics Classrooms. Environmental Justice. https://doi.org/10.1089/env.2021.0042
- Hernandez, J., and Vogt, K.A. (2020) Indigenizing Restoration: Indigenous Lands before UrbanParks. Human Biology 92.1: 37-44.
- Hernandez, J., and Spencer, M.S. (2020). "Weaving Indigenous Science into Ecological Sciences: Culturally Grounding Our Indigenous Scholarship." Human Biology 92.1: 5-9
- Spencer, M. S., Fentress, T., Touch, A., & Hernandez, J. (2020). Environmental Justice, Indigenous Knowledge Systems, and Native Hawaiians and Other Pacific Islanders. Human Biology, 92(1), 45-57.
- Hernandez, J. (2019). Indigenizing Environmental Justice: Case studies from the Pacific Northwest. Environmental Justice, 12(4), 175-181.
