= Manuel Suárez (rower) =

Cuban rower (born 1989)

Personal information
- Born: 5 December 1989 (age 36) Havana, Cuba

Sport
- Sport: Rowing
Medal record
Representing Cuba
Pan American Games
Gold medal – first place	2011 Guadalajara	Lightweight coxless four
Silver medal – second place	2015 Toronto	Coxless four

Manuel Suárez Barrios (born 5 December 1989) is a Cuban rower. He competed in the men's lightweight double sculls event with Yunior Perez at the 2012 Summer Olympics.
