= Nareg Guregian =

American rower

Personal information
- Born: January 20, 1989 (age 37) Los Angeles, California, United States

Sport
- Sport: Rowing
Medal record
Representing United States
Pan American Games
| Bronze medal – third place | 2015 Toronto | Coxless pair |
World Championships
| Bronze medal – third place | 2013 Chungju | Eight |

Nareg Guregian (born January 20, 1989) is an American rower. He competed in the men's coxless pair event at the 2016 Summer Olympics together with Anders Weiss.
