= Raúl Hernández (rower) =

Cuban rower (born 1992)

Personal information
- Born: 22 September 1992 (age 33) Camagüey, country

Sport
- Sport: Rowing
Medal record
Representing Cuba
Pan American Games
Bronze medal – third place	2015 Toronto	Lightweight double sculls
Central American and Caribbean Games
Gold medal – first place	2014 Veracruz	Lightweight double sculls
Gold medal – first place	2014 Veracruz	Lightweight coxless four

Raúl Hernández Hidalgo (born September 22, 1992) is a Cuban rower. He and Liosbel Hernández placed 18th in the men's lightweight double sculls event at the 2016 Summer Olympics.
