= Liosbel Hernández =

Cuban rower (born 1983)

Personal information
- Born: 17 December 1983 (age 42) Pinar del Río, Cuba

Sport
- Sport: Rowing
Medal record
Representing Cuba
Pan American Games
Gold medal – first place	2011 Guadalajara	Lightweight coxless four
Bronze medal – third place	2015 Toronto	Lightweight double sculls
Bronze medal – third place	2003 Santo Domingo	Lightweight coxless four
Central American and Caribbean Games
Gold medal – first place	2014 Veracruz	Lightweight double sculls
Gold medal – first place	2014 Veracruz	Lightweight coxless four

Liosbel Hernández Lazaga (born December 17, 1983) is a Cuban rower. He and Raúl Hernández placed 18th in the men's lightweight double sculls event at the 2016 Summer Olympics.
