= Adrián Oquendo =

Cuban rower

Personal information
- Born: 23 February 1990 (age 36) Aguada de Pasajeros, Cienfuegos, Cuba

Sport
- Sport: Rowing
Medal record
Men's rowing
Representing Cuba
Pan American Games
Silver medal – second place	2015 Toronto	Quadruple sculls
Silver medal – second place	2015 Toronto	Coxless four
Silver medal – second place	2019 Lima	Double sculls
Silver medal – second place	2019 Lima	Quadruple sculls
Bronze medal – third place	2019 Lima	Coxed eight

Adrián Oquendo (born 23 February 1990) is a Cuban rower. He competed in the men's double sculls event at the 2016 Summer Olympics.
