= Royal Canadian Henley Rowing Course =

Canadian rowing facility in Ontario

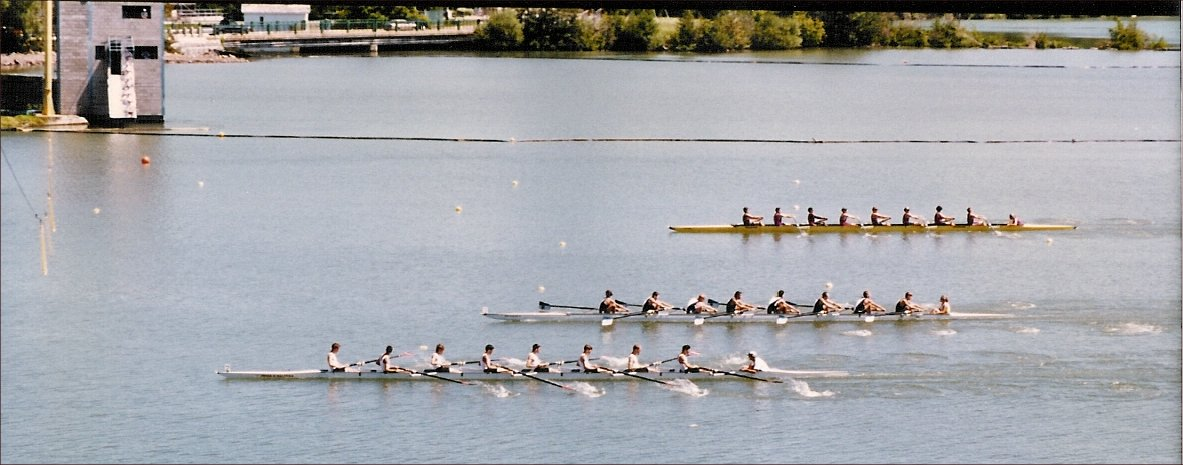
- Interactive map of Royal Canadian Henley Rowing Course
- Location: Martindale Pond, St. Catharines, Ontario
- Coordinates: 43.1996°N 79.2696°W
- Capacity: 2,500

Construction
- Opened: 1903
- Renovated: 1966, 1999, 2012-2014

Tenants
- Royal Canadian Henley Regatta; Brock Badgers; 1970 World Rowing Championships; 1993 Summer Universiade; 1999 World Rowing Championships; 2015 Pan American Games

The Royal Canadian Henley Rowing Course is a rowing facility that is located in Port Dalhousie, St. Catharines, Ontario, Canada. The facility was constructed in 1903 as a permanent venue for the Royal Canadian Henley Regatta. The facility is located on the Martindale Pond.

In 1966, the facility was renovated. It was also renovated extensively in 1999 to stage the 1999 World Rowing Championships. The venue also hosted the 1970 and 2024 World Rowing Championships, along with the rowing competitions at the 2015 Pan American Games. To stage the Games, the venue was again renovated in 2014.

The venue is classified by World Rowing as an "A" class venue.

== Lake specifications ==
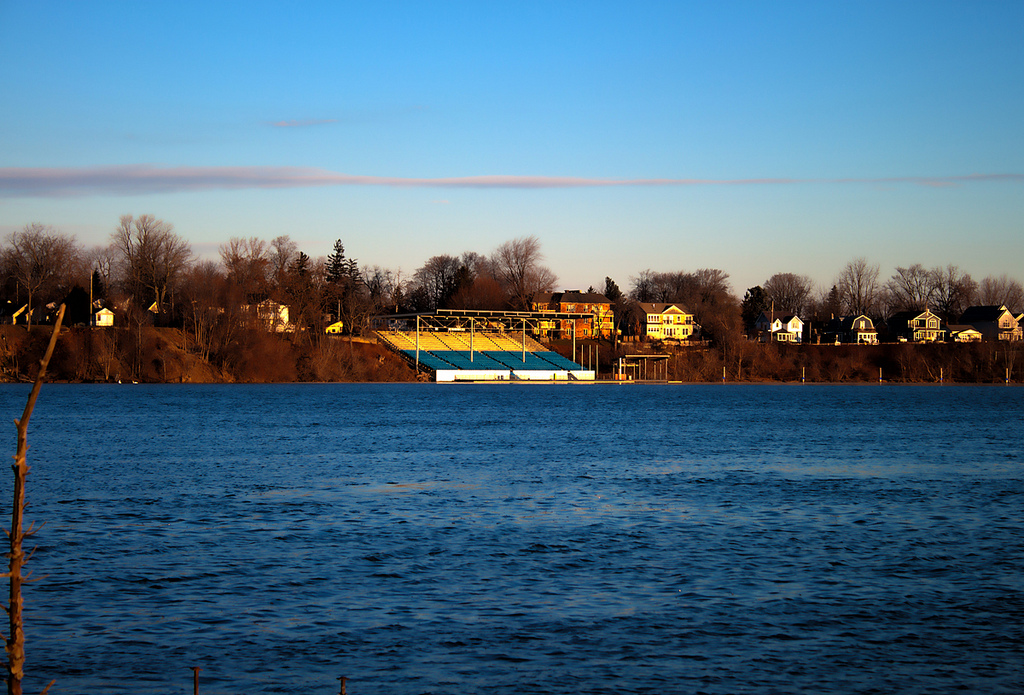
The grandstand of the rowing course.

The lake's dimensions follow the FISA rules for a rowing lake suitable for hosting a World Rowing Championship, World Rowing Cup, Pan American Games or Olympic regatta:

- Stillwater, with consistent water conditions
- 2,200 metres (7,200 ft) straight length for racing
- 8 rowing lanes, each 13.5 metres (44 ft) wide
- Minimum water depth of 3.5 metres (11 ft)
- A return channel allowing boats to move to the start, separated from the main lake by an island

== See also ==
- Venues of the 2015 Pan American and Parapan American Games
