= Bowling at the 2015 Pan American Games – Men's doubles =

Coordinates: 43°38′56.7″N 79°36′15.8″W

Men's doubles at the 2015 Pan American Games
- Venue: Pan Am Bowling Centre
- Dates: July 22–23
- Competitors: 28 from 14 nations
- Winning score: 5607

Medalists
Gold medal	François Lavoie; Dan MacLelland	Canada
Silver medal	Jaime González; Manuel Otalora	Colombia
Bronze medal	Devin Bidwell; Tommy Jones	United States

The men's doubles competition of the bowling events at the 2015 Pan American Games was held on July 22 and 23 at Planet Bowl (Pan Am Bowling Centre), due to naming rights the venue was known as the latter for the duration of the games.

Canadian pair François Lavoie and Dan MacLelland went onto secure the gold medal, with Lavoie scoring a perfect game in the fifth round, the first in Pan American Games history.

== Schedule ==
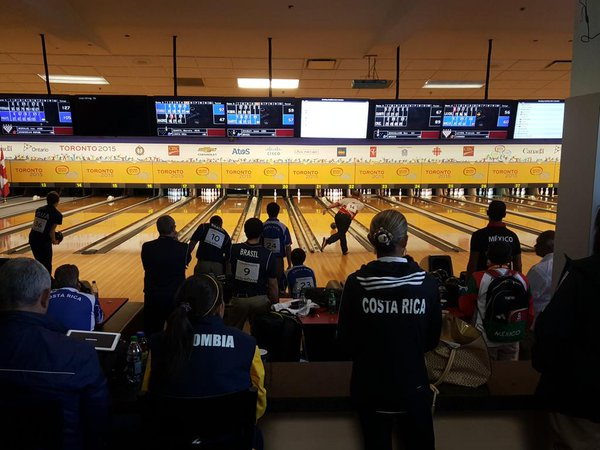
During the competition

All times are Eastern Standard Time (UTC-3).

Date	Time	Round
July 22, 2015	10:05	1–6 Games
July 23, 2015	15:05	7–12 Games

== Qualification ==
A total of 14 countries qualified two bowlers each through various events. This is summarized below.

Event	Vacancies	Qualified	Bowlers per NOC	Total
Host nation	1	Canada	2	2
South American Games	4	Colombia; Venezuela; Argentina; Brazil	2	8
Pan American Sports Festival	7	United States; Mexico; Costa Rica; Puerto Rico; Dominican Republic; Panama; Aruba	2	14
Central American and Caribbean Games	2	El Salvador; Guatemala	2	4
TOTAL				28

== Medalists ==
Event	Gold	Silver	Bronze
Men's doubles	Canada; François Lavoie; Dan MacLelland	Colombia; Jaime González; Manuel Otalora	United States; Devin Bidwell; Tommy Jones

== Results ==
Rank	Nation	Athlete	Total	Grand Total	Notes
1st place, gold medalist(s)	Canada	François Lavoie; Dan MacLelland	2677; 2930	5607	
2nd place, silver medalist(s)	Colombia	Jaime González; Manuel Otalora	2574; 2715	5289	
3rd place, bronze medalist(s)	United States	Devin Bidwell; Tommy Jones	2521; 2682	5203	
4	Mexico	Alejandro Cruz; Mario Quintero	2601; 2580	5181	
5	Venezuela	Amleto Monacelli; Ildemaro Ruiz	2662; 2500	5162	
6	Costa Rica	Rodolfo Madriz; James Stanley	2543; 2507	5050	
7	Dominican Republic	Manuel Fernandez; Alex Prats	2446; 2527	4973	
8	Puerto Rico	Cristian Azcona; Jean Pérez	2446; 2519	4965	
9	Brazil	Charles Robini; Marcelo Suartz	2397; 2529	4926	
10	El Salvador	Julio Acosta; Giancarlo Mateucchi	2262; 2467	4729	
11	Panama	Juan Narvaez; Carlos Olmos	2286; 2423	4709	
12	Guatemala	Armando Batres; José Morales	2245; 2310	4555	
13	Aruba	Bryan Helmeyer; Jason Odor	2263; 2238	4501	
14	Argentina	Ricardo Dalla Rosa; Ruben Favero	2187; 2176	4363	
