= Bowling at the 2015 Pan American Games – Men's singles =

Men's singles at the 2015 Pan American Games
- Venue: Pan Am Bowling Centre
- Dates: July 24–25
- Competitors: 28 from 14 nations
- Winning score: 201

Medalists
| Gold medal | Marcelo Suartz | Brazil |
| Silver medal | Amleto Monacelli | Venezuela |
| Bronze medal | Dan MacLelland | Canada |
| Bronze medal | Devin Bidwell | United States |

The men's singles competition of the bowling events at the 2015 Pan American Games was held on July 24 and 25 at Planet Bowl (Pan Am Bowling Centre), due to naming rights the venue was known as the latter for the duration of the games.

== Schedule ==
All times are Eastern Standard Time (UTC-3).

| Date | Time | Round |
|---|---|---|
| July 24, 2015 | 10:05 | Qualification 1–6 Games |
| July 24, 2015 | 15:30 | Qualification 7–12 Games |
| July 25, 2015 | 10:05 | Round Robin |
| July 25, 2015 | 15:15 | Semifinals |
| July 25, 2015 | 15:40 | Final |

== Qualification ==
A total of 14 countries qualified two bowlers each through various events. This is summarized below.

| Event | Vacancies | Qualified | Bowlers per NOC | Total |
|---|---|---|---|---|
| Host nation | 1 | Canada | 2 | 2 |
| South American Games | 4 | Colombia; Venezuela; Argentina; Brazil | 2 | 8 |
| Pan American Sports Festival | 7 | United States; Mexico; Costa Rica; Puerto Rico; Dominican Republic; Panama; Aruba | 2 | 14 |
| Central American and Caribbean Games | 2 | El Salvador; Guatemala | 2 | 4 |
| TOTAL | | | | 28 |

== Medalists ==
| Event | Gold | Silver | Bronze |
|---|---|---|---|
| Men's singles | Marcelo Suartz; Brazil | Amleto Monacelli; Venezuela | Dan MacLelland; Canada |
| Men's singles | Marcelo Suartz; Brazil | Amleto Monacelli; Venezuela | Devin Bidwell; United States |

== Results ==
=== Qualification ===
| Rank | Nation | Athlete | Qualification | Rank | Round Robin | Total | Notes |
|---|---|---|---|---|---|---|---|
| 1 | Dan MacLelland | Canada | 2699 | 2 | 1787 | 4486 | Q |
| 2 | Marcelo Suartz | Brazil | 2611 | 4 | 1850 | 4461 | Q |
| 3 | Devin Bidwell | United States | 2753 | 1 | 1659 | 4412 | Q |
| 4 | Amleto Monacelli | Venezuela | 2593 | 7 | 1811 | 4404 | Q |
| 5 | Tommy Jones | United States | 2603 | 5 | 1791 | 4394 | |
| 6 | François Lavoie | Canada | 2694 | 3 | 1695 | 4389 | |
| 7 | Alejandro Cruz | Mexico | 2546 | 8 | 1748 | 4294 | |
| 8 | Mario Quintero | Mexico | 2596 | 6 | 1623 | 4219 | |
| 9 | Cristian Azcona | Puerto Rico | 2486 | 9 | did not advance | | |
| 10 | James Stanley | Costa Rica | 2448 | 10 | did not advance | | |
| 11 | Manuel Fernandez | Dominican Republic | 2428 | 11 | did not advance | | |
| 12 | Jean Pérez | Puerto Rico | 2422 | 12 | did not advance | | |
| 13 | Armando Batres | Guatemala | 2410 | 13 | did not advance | | |
| 14 | Charles Robini | Brazil | 2404 | 14 | did not advance | | |
| 15 | Juan Narvaez | Panama | 2398 | 15 | did not advance | | |
| 16 | Rodolfo Madriz | Costa Rica | 2372 | 16 | did not advance | | |
| 17 | José Morales | Guatemala | 2359 | 17 | did not advance | | |
| 18 | Jaime González | Colombia | 2355 | 18 | did not advance | | |
| 19 | Giancarlo Mateucchi | El Salvador | 2311 | 19 | did not advance | | |
| 20 | Carlos Olmos | Panama | 2305 | 20 | did not advance | | |
| 21 | Ricardo Dalla Rosa | Argentina | 2294 | 21 | did not advance | | |
| 22 | Ildemaro Ruiz | Venezuela | 2283 | 22 | did not advance | | |
| 23 | Julio Acosta | El Salvador | 2273 | 23 | did not advance | | |
| 24 | Alex Prats | Dominican Republic | 2259 | 24 | did not advance | | |
| 25 | Ruben Favero | Argentina | 2249 | 25 | did not advance | | |
| 26 | Bryan Helmeyer | Aruba | 2247 | 26 | did not advance | | |
| 27 | Manuel Otalora | Colombia | 2210 | 27 | did not advance | | |
| 28 | Jason Odor | Aruba | 2132 | 28 | did not advance | | |

=== Semifinals ===
| Match | Rank | Nation | Athlete | Total | Notes |
|---|---|---|---|---|---|
| 1 | 1 | Amleto Monacelli | Venezuela | 187 | Q |
| 1 | 2 | Dan MacLelland | Canada | 178 | |
| 2 | 1 | Marcelo Suartz | Brazil | 202 | Q |
| 2 | 2 | Devin Bidwell | United States | 182 | |

=== Final ===
| Rank | Nation | Athlete | Total | Notes |
|---|---|---|---|---|
| 1st place, gold medalist(s) | Marcelo Suartz | Brazil | 201 | |
| 2nd place, silver medalist(s) | Amleto Monacelli | Venezuela | 189 | |
