= Judo at the 2015 Pan American Games – Qualification =

== Qualification system ==
A total of 140 judokas (ten per weight category) will qualify to compete at the games. There will be six qualification events for athletes to earn ranking points, and the top nine nations qualify per event. The host nation (Canada) is automatically qualified in each event, for a total of ten per event. If the host nations is not ranked in the top ten places, Canada will take the place of the tenth ranked nation. If Canada is ranked in the top nine nations, the tenth ranked nation will qualify instead. A nation may enter a maximum of one athlete per weight category.

== Qualification timeline ==
| Event | Date | Venue |
|---|---|---|
| 2012 Pan American Judo Championships | April 26–29 | (Canada) Montreal |
| 2013 Pan American Judo Championships | April 18–19 | (Costa Rica) San Jose |
| 2013 Copa Panamericana | April 20 | (Costa Rica) San Jose |
| 2014 Pan American Judo Championships | April 24–26 | (Ecuador) Guayaquil |
| 2014 Copa Panamericana | October 4 | (Barbados) Bridgetown |
| 2015 Pan American Judo Championships | April 24–26 | (Canada) Edmonton |

== Qualification summary ==
The final list of countries qualified was published by the Pan American Judo Confederation on April 25, 2015.

| NOC | Men | | | | | | | Women | | | | | | | Total |
| NOC | -60kg | -66kg | -73kg | -81kg | -90kg | -100kg | +100kg | -48kg | -52kg | -57kg | -63kg | -70kg | -78kg | +78kg | Total |
|---|---|---|---|---|---|---|---|---|---|---|---|---|---|---|---|
| Argentina | X | X | X | X | X | X | | X | X | X | X | | | X | 11 |
| Brazil | X | X | X | X | X | X | X | X | X | X | X | X | X | X | 14 |
| Canada | X | X | X | X | X | X | X | X | X | X | X | X | X | X | 14 |
| Chile | | | | X | X | | | X | | | | | X | | 4 |
| Colombia | X | | | X | | | X | X | X | X | X | X | X | | 9 |
| Costa Rica | | | | | | | | | | | | | | X | 1 |
| Cuba | X | X | X | X | X | X | X | X | X | X | X | X | X | X | 14 |
| Dominican Republic | X | X | X | | X | | | X | X | X | | | | X | 8 |
| Ecuador | X | X | X | | | | X | X | X | X | X | X | X | X | 11 |
| El Salvador | | X | X | X | | | | | | | | | | | 3 |
| Guatemala | | | | | | | | | | | X | X | X | | 3 |
| Honduras | | | | | | | X | | | | | | | | 1 |
| Mexico | X | | X | X | X | X | X | X | X | | X | X | X | X | 12 |
| Peru | X | X | | | | X | X | | | | | | | | 4 |
| Puerto Rico | | | X | X | | | | | | X | | X | | | 4 |
| Trinidad and Tobago | | | | | | X | | | | | | | | | 1 |
| United States | | X | X | X | X | X | X | | X | X | X | X | X | X | 12 |
| Uruguay | | | | | X | X | | | | | | | | | 2 |
| Venezuela | X | X | | | X | X | X | X | X | X | X | X | X | X | 12 |
| Total: 19 NOCs | 10 | 10 | 10 | 10 | 10 | 10 | 10 | 10 | 10 | 10 | 10 | 10 | 10 | 10 | 140 |

== Men ==
=== 60kg ===
| Criteria | Vacancies | Qualified |
|---|---|---|
| Host nation | 1 | Canada |
| Top 9 ranked countries | 9 | Brazil; Ecuador; Mexico; Dominican Republic; Argentina; Peru; Venezuela; Cuba; Colombia |
| TOTAL | 10 | |

=== 66kg ===
| Criteria | Vacancies | Qualified |
|---|---|---|
| Host nation | 1 | Canada |
| Top 9 ranked countries | 9 | Brazil; Cuba; ~~Mexico~~; Dominican Republic; Peru; Venezuela; United States; Argentina; El Salvador; Ecuador |
| TOTAL | 10 | |

=== 73kg ===
| Criteria | Vacancies | Qualified |
|---|---|---|
| Host nation | 1 | Canada |
| Top 9 ranked countries | 9 | Cuba; Brazil; United States; Argentina; Ecuador; Dominican Republic; Puerto Rico; Mexico; El Salvador |
| TOTAL | 10 | |

=== 81kg ===
| Criteria | Vacancies | Qualified |
|---|---|---|
| Host nation | 1 | Canada |
| Top 9 ranked countries | 9 | Brazil; Cuba; Argentina; United States; Colombia; El Salvador; Chile; Mexico; Puerto Rico |
| TOTAL | 10 | |

=== 90kg ===
| Criteria | Vacancies | Qualified |
|---|---|---|
| Host nation | 1 | Canada |
| Top 9 ranked countries | 9 | Brazil; Cuba; Chile; Dominican Republic; United States; Venezuela; Uruguay; Argentina; Mexico |
| TOTAL | 10 | |

=== 100kg ===
| Criteria | Vacancies | Qualified |
|---|---|---|
| Host nation | 1 | Canada |
| Top 9 ranked countries | 9 | Brazil; Cuba; Argentina; Venezuela; Mexico; Peru; United States; Uruguay; Trinidad and Tobago |
| TOTAL | 10 | |

=== +100kg ===
| Criteria | Vacancies | Qualified |
|---|---|---|
| Host nation | 1 | Canada |
| Top 9 ranked countries | 9 | Brazil; Cuba; Ecuador; Mexico; United States; Colombia; Honduras; Venezuela; ~~Guatemala~~; Peru |
| TOTAL | 10 | |

== Women ==
=== 48kg ===
| Criteria | Vacancies | Qualified |
|---|---|---|
| Host nation | 1 | Canada |
| Top 9 ranked countries | 9 | Cuba; Brazil; Mexico; Argentina; Ecuador; Venezuela; Colombia; Dominican Republic; Chile |
| TOTAL | 10 | |

=== 52kg ===
| Criteria | Vacancies | Qualified |
|---|---|---|
| Host nation | 1 | Canada |
| Top 9 ranked countries | 9 | Argentina; Brazil; Cuba; Mexico; Colombia; United States; Dominican Republic; Ecuador; Venezuela |
| TOTAL | 10 | |

=== 57kg ===
| Criteria | Vacancies | Qualified |
|---|---|---|
| Host nation | 1 | Canada |
| Top 9 ranked countries | 9 | Brazil; United States; Cuba; Argentina; Colombia; Ecuador; Dominican Republic; Puerto Rico; Venezuela |
| TOTAL | 10 | |

=== 63kg ===
| Criteria | Vacancies | Qualified |
|---|---|---|
| Host nation | 1 | Canada |
| Top 9 ranked countries | 9 | Cuba; Brazil; Colombia; Ecuador; United States; Mexico; ~~Costa Rica~~; Venezuela; Guatemala; Argentina |
| TOTAL | 10 | |

=== 70kg ===
| Criteria | Vacancies | Qualified |
|---|---|---|
| Host nation | 1 | Canada |
| Top 9 ranked countries | 9 | Brazil; Colombia; Ecuador; Venezuela; Cuba; United States; Puerto Rico; Mexico; ~~El Salvador~~; Guatemala |
| TOTAL | 10 | |

=== 78kg ===
| Criteria | Vacancies | Qualified |
|---|---|---|
| Host nation | 1 | Canada |
| Top 9 ranked countries | 9 | Brazil; Cuba; Ecuador; United States; Guatemala; Venezuela; Mexico; Chile; Colombia |
| TOTAL | 10 | |

=== +78kg ===
| Criteria | Vacancies | Qualified |
|---|---|---|
| Host nation | 1 | Canada |
| Top 9 ranked countries | 9 | Cuba; Brazil; Mexico; Ecuador; United States; ~~Puerto Rico~~; Dominican Republic; Argentina; Venezuela; Costa Rica |
| TOTAL | 10 | |
