= Roller sports at the 2015 Pan American Games – Qualification =

== Qualification system ==
A total of 56 skaters will qualify to compete at the Games. 20 male and 20 female speed skaters will qualify, while 8 male and 8 female figure skaters will also qualify. A nation may enter a maximum of six athletes (two male and two females on speed skating, with a maximum of one athlete per each figure skating event). The host nation (Canada) is automatically qualified with a full team.

=== Qualification summary ===
NOC	Figure		Speed		Total
NOC	Men	Women	Men	Women	Total
Argentina	1	1	2	2	6
Brazil	1	1			2
Canada		1	2	2	5
Chile	1	1	2	2	6
Colombia	1	1	2	2	6
Costa Rica			1	1	2
Dominican Republic	1		1		2
Ecuador		1	1	2	4
El Salvador			1	1	2
Guatemala			1	1	2
Mexico	1	1	2	2	6
Paraguay	1				1
Puerto Rico			1		1
United States	1	1	2	2	6
Venezuela			2	2	4
Total: 15 NOCs	8	8	20	20	56

== Figure ==
The top seven in each event, along with the host nation (Canada) qualified to compete at the Games. The qualification tournament took place between January 17 and 20 in Kissimmee, Florida, United States.

Event	Qualified Men	Qualified Women
Host nation	~~Canada~~	Canada
2014 Pan American Championship	Brazil; United States; Argentina; Colombia; Chile; Paraguay; Mexico	Argentina; United States; Chile; Colombia; Brazil; Ecuador; Mexico
Reallocation	Dominican Republic	
TOTAL	8	8

- Canada had no male competitors register for the national trials, and thus this quota was reallocated.

== Speed ==
The qualification event for speed competitions were held between January 23 and 27, 2014 in Cooper City, Florida.

Event	Skaters per NOC	Qualified Men	Qualified Women
Host nation	2	Canada	Canada
2014 Pan American Championship	2	Colombia; United States; Chile; Venezuela; Argentina; Mexico	Argentina; Colombia; Chile; Ecuador; Mexico; United States; Venezuela
2014 Pan American Championship	1	Ecuador; Dominican Republic; Costa Rica; Guatemala; El Salvador; Puerto Rico	Guatemala; El Salvador; Costa Rica*
TOTAL		20	19

- Costa Rica qualified two women, but only one was entered into the competitions, meaning 19 athletes qualified (instead of the 20 quotas).
