= Karate at the 2015 Pan American Games – Men's 84 kg =

Men's 84 kg at the 2015 Pan American Games
- Venue: Mississauga Sports Centre
- Dates: July 25
- Competitors: 8 from 8 nations

Medalists
Gold medal	Miguel Amargós	Argentina
Silver medal	Jorge Merino	El Salvador
Bronze medal	Andres Loor	Ecuador
Bronze medal	César Herrera	Venezuela

The men's 84 kg competition of the karate events at the 2015 Pan American Games in Toronto, Ontario, Canada, was held on July 25 at the Mississauga Sports Centre.

== Schedule ==
All times are Central Standard Time (UTC-6).

Date	Time	Round
July 25, 2015	14:05	Pool matches
July 25, 2015	20:19	Semifinals
July 25, 2015	21:08	Final

== Results ==
The final results.

Legend

- KK — Forfeit (Kiken)

=== Pool 1 ===
Athlete	Nation	Pld	W	D	L	Points		
Athlete	Nation	Pld	W	D	L	GF	GA	Diff
Andres Loor	Ecuador	3	2	1	0	3	1	+2
Miguel Amargós	Argentina	3	1	2	0	8	2	+6
Antonio Gutiérrez	Mexico	3	1	1	1	4	3	+1
Marcos Andrade	Brazil	3	0	0	3	3	12	-9

	Score	
Miguel Amargós (ARG)	7–1	Marcos Andrade (BRA)
Andres Loor (ECU)	1–0	Antonio Gutiérrez (MEX)
Miguel Amargós (ARG)	1–1	Andres Loor (ECU)
Marcos Andrade (BRA)	2–4	Antonio Gutiérrez (MEX)
Miguel Amargós (ARG)	0–0	Antonio Gutiérrez (MEX)
Marcos Andrade (BRA)	0–1	Andres Loor (ECU)

=== Pool 2 ===
Athlete	Nation	Pld	W	D	L	Points		
Athlete	Nation	Pld	W	D	L	GF	GA	Diff
César Herrera	Venezuela	3	3	0	0	10	6	+4
Jorge Merino	El Salvador	3	2	0	1	9	3	+6
Sarmen Sinani	Canada	3	1	0	2	14	12	+2
Jorge Acevedo	Chile	3	0	0	3	2	14	-12

	Score	
Sarmen Sinani (CAN)	8–0	Jorge Acevedo (CHI)
Jorge Merino (ESA)	0–1	César Herrera (VEN)
Sarmen Sinani (CAN)	1–6	Jorge Merino (ESA)
Jorge Acevedo (CHI)	1–3	César Herrera (VEN)
Sarmen Sinani (CAN)	5–6	César Herrera (VEN)
Jorge Acevedo (CHI)	1–3	Jorge Merino (ESA)

=== Finals ===
Semifinals
Andres Loor (ECU)	0
Jorge Merino (ESA)	2
Miguel Amargós (ARG)	7
César Herrera (VEN)	1

Gold medal match
Jorge Merino (ESA)	1
Miguel Amargós (ARG)	3
