= Manuel Brunet =

Argentine field hockey player

Personal information
- Born: 16 November 1985 (age 40) Rosario, Argentina
- Height: 1.79 m (5 ft 10 in)
- Weight: 79 kg (174 lb)

Sport
- Country: Argentina
- Sport: Field hockey
Medal record
Olympic Games
Gold medal – first place	2016 Rio de Janeiro	Team
World Cup
Bronze medal – third place	2014 The Hague
Pan American Games
Gold medal – first place	2011 Guadalajara	Team
Gold medal – first place	2015 Toronto	Team

Manuel Brunet (born 16 November 1985) is an Argentine field hockey player. At the 2012 Summer Olympics, he competed for the Argentina national team. Manuel won the bronze medal at the 2014 World Cup and two gold medals at the Pan American Games.

Manuel plays at Royal Daring Hockey Club in Belgium since 2012.

He is currently sponsored by Ritual Hockey.
