= Argentina at the 2015 Pan American Games =

- IOC code: ARG
- NOC: Comité Olímpico Argentino

in Toronto, Canada 10–26 July 2015
- Competitors: 472 in 35 sports
- Flag bearer (opening): Walter Pérez
- Flag bearer (closing): Julián Pinzás
- Medals Ranked 7th: Gold 15 Silver 29 Bronze 31 Total 75

Pan American Games appearances (overview)
- 1951; 1955; 1959; 1963; 1967; 1971; 1975; 1979; 1983; 1987; 1991; 1995; 1999; 2003; 2007; 2011; 2015; 2019; 2023

Argentina competed at the 2015 Pan American Games in Toronto, Ontario, Canada, from July 10 to 26, 2015. On June 1, 2015, track cyclist and former Olympic gold medalist Walter Pérez was named as the country's flagbearer during the opening ceremony.

== Competitors ==
The following table lists Argentina's delegation per sport and gender.

Sport	Men	Women	Total
Archery	2	3	5
Athletics	6	5	11
Badminton	3	3	6
Basketball	12	12	24
Beach volleyball	2	2	4
Bowling	2	2	4
Boxing	5	2	7
Canoeing	10	7	17
Cycling	15	8	23
Equestrian	10	3	13
Fencing	7	7	14
Field hockey	16	16	32
Football		18	18
Golf	2	2	4
Gymnastics	4	8	12
Handball	15	15	30
Judo	6	5	11
Modern pentathlon	2	2	4
Racquetball	2	2	4
Roller sports	3	3	6
Rowing	15	8	23
Rugby sevens	12	12	24
Sailing	11	5	16
Shooting	12	5	17
Softball	15		15
Squash	3	3	6
Swimming	15	9	24
Synchronized swimming		9	9
Table tennis	3	3	6
Taekwondo	3	2	5
Tennis	2	2	4
Triathlon	3	3	6
Volleyball	12	12	24
Water polo	13	13	26
Water skiing	4	1	5
Weightlifting	1	1	2
Wrestling	5	1	6
Total	253	214	467

== Medalists ==
Medal	Name	Sport	Event	Date
Gold	Giselle Soler	Roller sports	Women's free skating	July 12
Gold	Maira Arias	Roller sports	Women's 10,000 m Points Race	July 13
Gold	Rubén Rézola; Ezequiel Di Giácomo	Canoeing	Men's K-2 200 m	July 14
Gold	Axel Haack; Diego López	Rowing	Coxless Pair	July 14
Gold	Federico Grabich	Swimming	Men's 100 m Freestyle	July 14
Gold	Facundo Bagnis	Tennis	Men's singles	July 15
Gold	Guido Andreozzi; María Irigoyen	Tennis	Mixed doubles	July 15
Gold	Victoria Travascio; María Sol Branz	Sailing	Women's 49erFX	July 18
Gold	Javier Conte; María Salerno; Nicolás Fracchia	Sailing	Mixed Lightning	July 19
Gold	Matías Pereira; Guillermo Bellinotto; Federico Ambrus; Juan Pereira	Sailing	Open J-24	July 19
Gold	Ana Gallay; Georgina Klug	Beach volleyball	Women's tournament	July 21
Gold	Julián Pinzás	Karate	Men's 67 kg	July 24
Gold	Argentina men's national field hockey team: Juan Manuel Vivaldi; Facundo Callioni; Ignacio Ortiz; Pablo Trevisán; Gonzalo Peillat; Matías Paredes; Juan Martín López; Manuel Brunet; Juan Ignacio Gilardi; Joaquín Menini; Nicolás Della Torre; Agustín Mazzili; Pedro Ibarra; Lucas Vila; Isidoro Ibarra; Lucas Rossi	Field hockey	Men's tournament	July 25
Gold	Miguel Amargós	Karate	Men's 84 kg	July 25
Gold	Argentina men's national volleyball team: Sebastián Closter; Javier Filardi; Martín Ramos; Facundo Conte; Maximiliano Gauna; Sebastián Solé; Pablo Crer; José González; Nicolás Uriarte; Luciano De Cecco; Ezequiel Palacios; Luciano Zornetta	Volleyball	Men's tournament	July 26
Silver	Paula Pareto	Judo	Women's 48 kg	July 11
Silver	Catriel Soto	Cycling	Men's cross-country	July 12
Silver	Alejandro Clara	Judo	Men's 73 kg	July 12
Silver	Argentina national rugby sevens team: Fernando Luna; Emiliano Boffelli; Franco Sábato; Santiago Álvarez; Gastón Revol; Juan Tuculet; Germán Schulz; Bautista Ezcurra; Ramiro Finco; Nicolás Bruzzonel; Rodrigo Etchart; Axel Müller Aranda	Rugby sevens	Men's tournament	July 12
Silver	Daniel Dal Bo	Canoeing	Men's K-1 1000 metres	July 13
Silver	Pablo de Torres; Gonzalo Carreras	Canoeing	Men's K-2 1000 metres	July 13
Silver	Ezequiel Capellano	Roller sports	Men's 500 metres	July 13
Silver	Cristian Rosso; Rodrigo Murillo	Rowing	Men's Double Sculls	July 13
Silver	Fernanda Russo	Shooting	Women's 10m Air Rifle	July 13
Silver	Sabrina Ameghino; Alexandra Keresztesi	Canoeing	Women's K-2 500 metres	July 14
Silver	Fernando Borello	Shooting	Men's Trap	July 14
Silver	Joaquín Iwan; Axel Haack; Osvaldo Suárez; Francisco Esteras; Iván Carino; Rodrigo Murillo; Diego López; Agustín Díaz; Joel Infante	Rowing	Men's Eight	July 15
Silver	Federico Grabich	Swimming	Men's 200 m Freestyle	July 15
Silver	Facundo Bagnis; Guido Andreozzi	Tennis	Men's doubles	July 15
Silver	Santiago Grassi	Swimming	Men's 100 m Butterfly	July 16
Silver	Amelia Fournel	Shooting	Women's 50m Rifle 3 Positions	July 18
Silver	Melisa Gil	Shooting	Women's Skeet	July 18
Silver	Mauro Agostini; Walter Pérez; Maximiliano Richeze; Juan Merlos; Adrián Richeze	Cycling	Men's Team Pursuit	July 19
Silver	Tomás Cocha	Golf	Men's Individual	July 19
Silver	Luis Soubié; Diego Lipszyc	Sailing	Open Snipe	July 19
Silver	Germán Chiaraviglio	Athletics	Men's Pole Vault	July 21
Silver	José Domínguez	Fencing	Men's Épée Individual	July 21
Silver	José María Larocca; Ramiro Quintana; Luis Birabén; Matías Albarracín	Equestrian	Team Jumping	July 23
Silver	Argentina women's national field hockey team: Belén Succi; Delfina Merino; Agustina Albertarrio; Noel Barrionuevo; Macarena Rodríguez; Agustina Habif; Luciana Molina; Julia Gomes Fantasia; Jimena Cedrés; Florencia Habif; Pilar Romang; Josefina Sruoga; Martina Cavallero; Rocío Sánchez Moccia; Paula Ortiz; Florencia Mutio	Field hockey	Women's tournament	July 24
Silver	Argentina women's national handball team: Marisol Carratu; Rocío Campigli; Antonella Gambino; Antonela Mena; Lucía Haro; Amelia Belotti; Valentina Kogan; Macarena Gandulfo; Manuela Pizzo; Luciana Mendoza; Valeria Bianchi; Elke Karsten; Luciana Salvado; Victoria Crivelli; Macarena Sans	Handball	Women's tournament	July 24
Silver	María José Vargas	Racquetball	Women's singles	July 24
Silver	María José Vargas; Veronique Guillemette	Racquetball	Women's doubles	July 24
Silver	Dayana Sánchez	Boxing	Women's Light Welterweight	July 25
Silver	Argentina men's national handball team: Matías Schulz; Pablo Sebastián Portela; Federico Matías Vieyra; Damián Migueles; Federico Fernández; Diego Simonet; Fernando Gabriel García; Adrián Portela; Federico Pizarro; Pablo Simonet; Juan Pablo Fernández; Sergio Crevatin; Sebastián Simonet; Leonardo Facundo Querín; Gonzalo Carou	Handball	Men's tournament	July 25
Bronze	Sabrina Ameghino; Alexandra Keresztesi; María Magdalena Garro; Brenda Rojas	Canoeing	Women's K-4 500 metres	July 11
Bronze	Mariana Díaz	Cycling	Women's BMX	July 11
Bronze	Daniel Dal Bo; Gonzalo Carreras; Juan Ignacio Cáceres; Pablo de Torres	Canoeing	Men's K-4 1000 metres	July 12
Bronze	Fernando González	Judo	Men's 66 kg	July 12
Bronze	Joaquín Iwan; Francisco Esteras; Iván Carino; Agustín Díaz	Rowing	Men's Coxless Four	July 13
Bronze	Sabrina Ameghino	Canoeing	Women's K-1 200 metres	July 14
Bronze	Héctor Campos	Judo	Men's 100 kg	July 14
Bronze	Cristian Rosso; Osvaldo Suárez; Rodrigo Murillo; Brian Rosso	Rowing	Men's Quadruple Sculls	July 14
Bronze	Brian Rosso	Rowing	Men's Single Sculls	July 15
Bronze	Lucía Palermo	Rowing	Women's Lightweight Single Sculls	July 15
Bronze	María Laura Abalo; Karina Wilvers; Milka Kraljev; María Clara Rohner	Rowing	Women's Quadruple Sculls	July 15
Bronze	Rodrigo Pezzota; Robertino Pezzota; Leandro Romiglio	Squash	Men's Team	July 16
Bronze	María Irigoyen; Paula Ormaechea	Tennis	Women's doubles	July 16
~~Bronze~~	~~Luz Vázquez~~	~~Wrestling~~	~~Women's Freestyle 69 kg~~	~~July 17~~
Bronze	Mariano Reutemann	Sailing	Men's Windsurfing RSX	July 18
Bronze	Argentina national softball team: Mauricio Cáceres; Gustavo Godoy; Juan Malarczuk; Mariano Montero; Fernando Petric; Santiago Carril; Román Godoy; Huemul Mata; Pablo Montero; Juan Potolicchio; Sebastián Gervasutti; Manuel Godoy; Teo Migliavacca; Bruno Motroni; Juan Zara	Softball	Men's tournament	July 18
Bronze	Sebastián Rossi; Lucas Rossi	Canoeing	Men's slalom C-2	July 19
Bronze	Tomás Cocha; Delfina Acosta; Manuela Carbajo Re; Alejandro Tosti	Golf	Mixed Team	July 19
Bronze	Lucas Guzmán	Taekwondo	Men's 58 kg	July 19
Bronze	Ricardo Bustamante	Fencing	Men's Sabre Individual	July 20
Bronze	María Belén Pérez Maurice	Fencing	Women's Sabre Individual	July 20
Bronze	Germán Lauro	Athletics	Men's Shot Put	July 21
Bronze	Lucía Pérez	Boxing	Women's Light Heavyweight	July 21
Bronze	Alexis Arnoldt	Taekwondo	Women's 67 kg	July 21
Bronze	Javier Julio	Water Skiing	Men's overall	July 22
Bronze	Alberto Palmetta	Boxing	Men's Welterweight	July 23
Bronze	Ricardo Bustamante; Stefano Lucchetti; Pascual Di Tella	Fencing	Men's Team Sabre	July 23
Bronze	Javier Julio	Water Skiing	Men's slalom	July 23
Bronze	Javier Julio	Water Skiing	Men's Tricks	July 23
Bronze	Franco Icasati	Karate	Men's 75 kg	July 24
Bronze	Mariano Mastromarino	Athletics	Men's Marathon	July 25

Medals by sport
Sport	1st place, gold medalist(s)	2nd place, silver medalist(s)	3rd place, bronze medalist(s)	Total
Sailing	3	1	1	5
Tennis	2	1	1	4
Roller Sports	2	1	0	3
Karate	2	0	1	3
Canoeing	1	3	4	8
Rowing	1	2	5	8
Swimming	1	2	0	3
Field hockey	1	1	0	2
Beach volleyball	1	0	0	1
Volleyball	1	0	0	1
Judo	0	2	2	4
Shooting	0	4	0	4
Cycling	0	2	1	3
Handball	0	2	0	2
Racquetball	0	2	0	2
Fencing	0	1	3	4
Athletics	0	1	2	3
Boxing	0	1	2	3
Golf	0	1	1	2
Equestrian	0	1	0	1
Rugby Sevens	0	1	0	1
Water Skiing	0	0	3	3
Taekwondo	0	0	2	2
Softball	0	0	1	1
Squash	0	0	1	1
Wrestling	0	0	1	1
Total	15	29	31	75

Medals by day
Day	1st place, gold medalist(s)	2nd place, silver medalist(s)	3rd place, bronze medalist(s)	Total
July 11	0	1	2	3
July 12	1	3	2	6
July 13	1	5	1	7
July 14	3	2	3	8
July 15	2	3	3	8
July 16	0	1	2	3
July 17	0	0	1	1
July 18	1	2	2	5
July 19	2	3	3	8
July 20	0	0	2	2
July 21	1	2	3	6
July 22	0	0	1	1
July 23	0	1	4	5
July 24	1	4	1	6
July 25	2	2	1	5
July 26	1	0	0	1
Total	15	29	31	75

== Archery ==
Argentina qualified two female archers based on its performance at the 2014 Pan American Championships. Later Argentina qualified 2 men and 1 more woman based on its performance at the 2015 Copa Merengue.

Men

Athlete	Event	Ranking Round		Round of 32	Round of 16	Quarterfinals	Semifinals	Final / BM	Rank
Athlete	Event	Score	Seed	Opposition Score	Opposition Score	Opposition Score	Opposition Score	Opposition Score	Rank
Daniel Cannelli	Individual	611	30th	Brady Ellison (USA); L 2–6	Did not advance				
Hugo Robles	Individual	642	17th	Andrés Aguilar Gimpel (CHI); W 6–5	Zach Garret (USA); L 2–6	Did not advance			

Women

Athlete	Event	Ranking Round		Round of 32	Round of 16	Quarterfinals	Semifinals	Final / BM	Rank
Athlete	Event	Score	Seed	Opposition Score	Opposition Score	Opposition Score	Opposition Score	Opposition Score	Rank
Fernanda Faisal	Individual	565	28th	Natalia Sánchez (COL); L 0–6	Did not advance				
Florencia Leithold Juárez	Individual	577	27th	Ariel Gibilaro (USA); L 4–6	Did not advance				
Ximena Mendiberry	Individual	600	17th	Maira Sepúlveda (COL); L 3–7	Did not advance				
Fernanda Faisal; Florencia Leithold Juárez; Ximena Mendiberry	Team	1742	8th	—N/a	Chile; L 0–6	Did not advance			

== Athletics ==
Argentina qualified three athletes in three different disciplines.

Men

Athlete	Event	Round 1		Semifinal		Final	
Athlete	Event	Result	Rank	Result	Rank	Result	Rank
Federico Bruno	1500 m	—N/a				3:42.88	6th
Federico Bruno	5000 m	—N/a				Did not finish	
Juan Cano Ceres	20 km walk	—N/a				1:29:06	8th
Mariano Mastromarino	Marathon	—N/a				2:17:45	3rd place, bronze medalist(s)

Field events

Athlete	Event	Qualification		Final	
Athlete	Event	Distance	Position	Distance	Position
Germán Chiaraviglio	Pole vault	—N/a		5.75	2nd place, silver medalist(s)
Germán Lauro	Shot put	—N/a		20.24	3rd place, bronze medalist(s)
Braian Toledo	Javelin throw	—N/a		77.68	4th

Women

Athlete	Event	Round 1		Semifinal		Final	
Athlete	Event	Result	Rank	Result	Rank	Result	Rank
Rosa Godoy	10,000 m	—N/a				33:29.41	9th
Belén Casetta	3000 m steeplechase	—N/a				10:24.54	7th

Field events

Athlete	Event	Qualification		Final	
Athlete	Event	Distance	Position	Distance	Position
Valeria Chiaraviglio	Pole vault	—N/a		4.15	9th
Jennifer Dahlgren	Hammer throw	—N/a		65.33	7th
Bárbara Comba	Discus throw	—N/a		55.80	8th

Key

- Note–Ranks given for track events are within the athlete's heat only
- Q = Qualified for the next round
- q = Qualified for the next round as a fastest loser or, in field events, by position without achieving the qualifying target
- NR = National record
- N/A = Round not applicable for the event

== Badminton ==
Argentina qualified a team of six athletes (three men and three women).

Men

Athlete	Event	First round	Round of 32	Round of 16	Quarterfinals	Semifinals	Final	Rank
Athlete	Event	Opposition Result	Opposition Result	Opposition Result	Opposition Result	Opposition Result	Opposition Result	Rank
Federico Díaz	Singles	—N/a	Y Coelho (BRA); L 21–19, 8–21, 12–21	Did not advance				
Pablo Macagno	Singles	A D'Souza (CAN); L 9 – 21, 9 – 21	Did not advance					
Tomás Thouyaret	Singles	—N/a	R Ramírez (GUA); L 14–21, 6–21	Did not advance				
Federico Díaz; Pablo Macagno	Doubles	G Henry (JAM); D Reid (JAM); L 15–21, 14–21	Did not advance					

Women

Athlete	Event	Round of 32	Round of 16	Quarterfinals	Semifinals	Final	Rank
Athlete	Event	Opposition Result	Opposition Result	Opposition Result	Opposition Result	Opposition Result	Rank
María Bernatene	Singles	F Centeno (ESA); L 15–21, 13–21	Did not advance				
Bárbara Berruezo	Singles	M Li (CAN); L 4–21, 5–21	Did not advance				
Daiana Garmendia	Singles	A Paiz (GUA); L 13–21, 21–19, 13–21	Did not advance				
María Bernatene; Daiana Garmendia	Doubles	B Polanco (DOM); D Saturria (DOM); L 8–21, 12–21	Did not advance				

Mixed

Athlete	Event	First round	Second round	Quarterfinals	Semifinals	Final	Rank
Athlete	Event	Opposition Result	Opposition Result	Opposition Result	Opposition Result	Mixed doubles	Rank
Pablo Macagno; María Bernatene	Doubles	W Cabrera (DOM); B Polanco (DOM); L 10–21, 13–21	Did not advance				
Tomás Thouyaret; Bárbara Berruezo	Doubles	E Reyes (CUB); M Azcuy Perez (CUB); L 7–21, 11–21	Did not advance				

== Basketball ==
Argentina qualified a men's and a women's team. Each team consisted of 12 athletes, for a total of 24.

=== Men's tournament ===
The Argentina men's national basketball team roster for the 2015 Pan American Games.

Argentina men's national basketball team – 2015 Pan American Games roster
Players
Coaches

Pos.	No.	Name	Age – Date of birth	Height	Club
G	4	Vildoza, Luca	19 – 11 Aug 1995	1.91 m (6 ft 3 in)	(Argentina) Quilmes
G	5	Richotti, Nicolas	28 – 17 Oct 1986	1.83 m (6 ft 0 in)	(Spain) CB Canarias
F	6	Mata, Marcos	28 – 1 Aug 1986	2.01 m (6 ft 7 in)	(Brazil) Franca
G	7	Campazzo, Facundo	24 – 23 Mar 1991	1.79 m (5 ft 10 in)	(Spain) Real Madrid
G	8	Laprovittola, Nicolas	25 – 31 Jan 1990	1.87 m (6 ft 2 in)	(Brazil) Flamengo
F	9	Brussino, Nicolas	22 – 2 Mar 1993	2.03 m (6 ft 8 in)	(Argentina) Regatas
F	10	Aguerre, Federico	26 – 23 Oct 1988	2.04 m (6 ft 8 in)	(Argentina) Atenas
C	11	Gallizzi, Tayavek	22 – 8 Feb 1993	2.04 m (6 ft 8 in)	(Argentina) Quilmes
C	12	Delia, Marcos	23 – 8 Apr 1992	2.09 m (6 ft 10 in)	(Argentina) Obras Sanitarias
C	13	Torres, Juan Manuel	31 – 24 Feb 1984	2.10 m (6 ft 11 in)	(Argentina) Atenas
F	14	Bortolin, Matias	22 – 11 Apr 1993	2.07 m (6 ft 9 in)	(Argentina) Atenas
F	15	Garino, Patricio	22 – 17 May 1993	1.98 m (6 ft 6 in)	(United States) George Washington

Head coach

- Hernandez, Sergio

Assistant coach(es)

- Santander, Silvio
- Casalanguida, Nicolas

Legend

- Age – as of 16 July 2015
- Club – before start of Games

Group B

Team	Pld	W	L	PF	PA	PD	Pts	Qualification
Canada	3	3	0	289	247	+42	6	Qualified for the semifinals
Dominican Republic	3	1	2	253	255	−2	4 (Note: 1st tie-breaker: The bottom 3 teams had the exact same head-to-head record of 1–1) (Note: 2nd tie-breaker: Dominican Republic had a +15 head-to-head point differential, Argentina had a +8 head-to-head point differential, and Mexico had a −23 head-to-head point differential.)	Qualified for the semifinals
Argentina	3	1	2	247	244	+3	4	
Mexico	3	1	2	232	275	−43	4	

Notes:

21 July 2015
13:30

Report

Mexico	86–84 (OT)	Argentina
Scoring by quarter: 12–15, 25–14, 27–22, 12–25, Overtime: 10–8
Pts: Hernández 19; Rebs: Gutiérrez 14; Asts: Cruz 2		Pts: Laprovíttola 21; Rebs: Delía 10; Asts: Campazzo 5

Ryerson Athletic Centre, Toronto

22 July 2015
18:00

Report

Argentina	83–88	Canada
Scoring by quarter: 24–24, 26–20, 16–15, 17–29
Pts: Campazzo 23; Rebs: Richotti, Delía 5 Asts: Laprovíttola 7		Pts: Nicholson 24; Rebs: Nicholson 12; Asts: Cadougan 4

Ryerson Athletic Centre, Toronto

23 July 2015
10:30

Report

Dominican Republic	70–80	Argentina
Scoring by quarter: 18–18, 14–26, 20–10, 18–26
Pts: Stokley 19; Rebs: Santana 9 Asts: Acosta 6		Pts: Brussino 21; Rebs: Delía 8 Asts: Laprovíttola 6

Ryerson Athletic Centre, Toronto

Fifth place match

24 July 2015
21:00

Report

Puerto Rico	85–105	Argentina
Scoring by quarter: 21–22, 18–20, 24–32, 22–31
Pts: de Jesus 12; Rebs: Clavell 7 Asts: Browne 5		Pts: Campazzo 17; Rebs: Delía 12; Asts: Campazzo, Laprovíttola 4

Ryerson Athletic Centre, Toronto

=== Women's tournament ===
The Argentina women's national basketball team roster for the 2015 Pan American Games.

Argentina women's national basketball team – 2015 Pan American Games roster
Players
Coaches

Pos.	No.	Name	Age – Date of birth	Height	Club
F	4	Rosset, Macarena	24 – Feb 23, 1991	1.76 m (5 ft 9 in)	(Argentina) Peñarol
C	5	Santana, Ornella	24 – Sep 17, 1990	1.80 m (5 ft 11 in)	(Argentina) Berazategui
F	6	Reggiardo, Paula	30 – Aug 31, 1984	1.73 m (5 ft 8 in)	(Argentina) Obras Sanitarias
C	7	Cabrera, Diana	21 – Aug 7, 1993	1.84 m (6 ft 0 in)	(Argentina) Union Florida
F	8	Boquete, Andrea	24 – Sep 24, 1990	1.80 m (5 ft 11 in)	(Argentina) Berazategui
C	9	Fiorotto, Celia	23 – Jun 2, 1992	1.84 m (6 ft 0 in)	(Argentina) Union Florida
C	10	Burani, Agostina	23 – Oct 4, 1991	1.85 m (6 ft 1 in)	(Argentina) Union Florida
G	11	Gretter, Melisa	22 – Jan 24, 1993	1.60 m (5 ft 3 in)	(Argentina) Union Florida
G	12	Pavón, Sandra	30 – Jun 1, 1985	1.72 m (5 ft 8 in)	(Argentina) Velez Sarsfield
G	13	González, Débora	25 – Jan 10, 1990	1.65 m (5 ft 5 in)	(Italy) Virtus Eirene Ragusa
F	14	Thomas, Sthefany	26 – May 4, 1989	1.75 m (5 ft 9 in)	(Brazil) Jaraguá
C	15	Vega, Gisela	33 – Mar 14, 1982	1.89 m (6 ft 2 in)	(Argentina) Union Florida

Head coach

- Cristian Santander

Assistant coach(es)

- Sebastian Silva

Legend

- Age – as of 15 July 2015
- Club – before start of Games

Group B

Team	Pld	W	L	PF	PA	PD	Pts	Qualification
Canada	3	3	0	245	164	+81	6	Qualified for the semifinals
Cuba	3	2	1	209	188	+21	5	Qualified for the semifinals
Argentina	3	1	2	200	209	−9	4	
Venezuela	3	0	3	168	261	−93	3	

16 July 2015
10:30

Report

Cuba	68–55	Argentina
Scoring by quarter: 23–12, 13–14, 14–17, 18–12
Pts: Amargo 17; Rebs: Noblet 9 Asts: Amargo 3		Pts: González 15; Rebs: Vega 7 Asts: Boquete 6

Ryerson Athletic Centre, Toronto

17 July 2015
18:00

Report

Argentina	58–73	Canada
Scoring by quarter: 6–19, 15–9, 23–19, 14–26
Pts: Boquete, Gretter, Thomas Diaz 8 Rebs: Gretter, Pavón, Thomas Diaz 3 Asts: four players 1		Pts: Ayim, Tatham 12; Rebs: Langlois 6 Asts: four players 2

Ryerson Athletic Centre, Toronto

18 July 2015
10:30

Report

Argentina	87–68	Venezuela
Scoring by quarter: 23–15, 16–13, 21–22, 27–18
Pts: Boquete 18; Rebs: Santana 9 Asts: Gretter 7		Pts: Silva Serrano 20; Rebs: Perez Abreu 8 Asts: Marquez Agudo 3

Ryerson Athletic Centre, Toronto

Fifth place match

19 July 2015
21:00

Report

Puerto Rico	56–77	Argentina
Scoring by quarter: 10–19, 14–15, 19–22, 13–21
Pts: Delgado 19; Rebs: Bermudez, García 9 Asts: Delgado 2		Pts: Vega 18; Rebs: Vega 9 Asts: Gretter 8

Ryerson Athletic Centre, Toronto

== Beach volleyball ==
Argentina qualified a men's and women's pair for a total of four athletes.

Athlete	Event	Preliminary round			Round of 16	Quarterfinals	Semifinals	Finals	
Athlete	Event	Opposition Score	Opposition Score	Opposition Score	Opposition Score	Opposition Score	Opposition Score	Opposition Score	Rank
Nicolás Capogrosso; Ian Mehamed	Men's	Cuba; L 19–21, 12–21	Saint Lucia; W 21–17, 21–17	United States; W 21–9, 21–11	Nicaragua; W 21–15, 21–15	Chile; L 18–21, 12–21	5th–8th place match Canada; W 21–0, 21–0	5th–6th place match Uruguay; L 11–21, 18–21	6th
Ana Gallay; Georgina Klug	Women's	Trinidad and Tobago; W 21–11, 21–13	Cuba; L 21–19, 15–21, 13–21	Mexico; W 21–15, 21–10	Chile; W 21–9, 21–10	United States; W 21–18, 21–12	Brazil; W 21–17, 21–23, 15–13	Cuba; W 21–7, 19–21, 15–7	1st place, gold medalist(s)

== Bowling ==
Argentina qualified 4 players, two for the men's individual tournament and doubles and two for the women's individual tournament and doubles.

Singles

Athlete	Event	Qualification															Round of 16	Quarterfinals	Semifinals	Finals	
Athlete	Event	Block 1 (Games 1–6)						Block 2 (Games 7–12)						Total	Average	Rank	Round of 16	Quarterfinals	Semifinals	Finals	
Athlete	Event	1	2	3	4	5	6	7	8	9	10	11	12	Total	Average	Rank	Opposition Scores	Opposition Scores	Opposition Scores	Opposition Scores	Rank
Ricardo Dalla Rosa	Men's	214	225	231	163	160	146	229	199	222	170	174	161	2294	191.2	21st	Did not advance				
Rubén Favero	Men's	187	232	166	190	156	180	194	203	193	148	178	222	2249	187.4	25th	Did not advance				
María Lanzavecchia	Women's	223	223	192	183	226	165	192	170	167	196	152	184	2273	189.4	23rd	Did not advance				
Vanesa Rinke	Women's	195	166	161	246	212	225	148	212	191	269	211	202	2438	203.2	9th	Did not advance				

Pairs

Athlete	Event	Block 1 (Games 1–6)								Block 2 (Games 7–12)								Grand Total	Final Rank
Athlete	Event	1	2	3	4	5	6	Total	Average	7	8	9	10	11	12	Total	Average	Grand Total	Final Rank
Ricardo Dalla Rosa; Rubén Favero	Men's	203	234	202	156	167	172	1134	189.0	186	176	184	150	176	181	2187	182.3	4363	14th
Ricardo Dalla Rosa; Rubén Favero	Men's	207	198	179	144	172	152	1052	175.3	204	133	214	152	217	204	2176	181.3	4363	14th
María Lanzavecchia; Vanesa Rinke	Women's	174	165	123	221	158	178	1019	169.8	201	204	159	235	173	253	2244	187.0	4646	7th
María Lanzavecchia; Vanesa Rinke	Women's	188	180	197	224	222	189	1200	200.0	218	192	158	217	234	183	2402	200.2	4646	7th

== Boxing ==
Argentina qualified 7 boxers, five for the men's events and two for the women's events.

Men

Athlete	Event	Preliminaries	Quarterfinals	Semifinals	Final	Rank
Athlete	Event	Opposition Result	Opposition Result	Opposition Result	Opposition Result	Rank
Junior Zárate	Light flyweight	—N/a	V Santillan Perez (DOM); L 0–3	Did not advance		
Ronán Sánchez	Lightweight	—N/a	K Luna Munoz (GUA); L 1–2	Did not advance		
Lucas Giménez	Light Welterweight	—N/a	A Biyarslanov (CAN); L 0–3	Did not advance		
Alberto Palmeta	Welterweight	—N/a	C Hield (BAH); W 3–0	R Iglesias (CUB); L 0–3	Did not advance	3rd place, bronze medalist(s)
Marcos Escudero	Light Heavyweight	—N/a	JC Carrillo Palacio (COL); L 0–3	Did not advance		

Women

Athlete	Event	Quarterfinals	Semifinals	Final	Rank
Athlete	Event	Opposition Result	Opposition Result	Opposition Result	Rank
Dayana Sánchez	Light welterweight	S Barrientos Lopez (PER); W 3–0	V Torres (MEX); W 3–0	C Veyre (CAN); L 0–2	2nd place, silver medalist(s)
Lucía Pérez	Light heavyweight	JP Caicedo Sinisterra (COL); W 2–0	C Shields (USA); L 0–3	Did not advance	3rd place, bronze medalist(s)

== Canoeing ==
=== Slalom ===
Argentina qualified the following boats:

Athlete(s)	Event	Preliminary						Semifinal		Final	
Athlete(s)	Event	Run 1	Rank	Run 2	Rank	Best	Rank	Time	Rank	Time	Rank
Sebastián Rossi	Men's C-1	92.02	2nd	90.16	2nd	90.16	2nd	120.25	3rd	99.95	4th
Sebastián Rossi; Lucas Rossi	Men's C-2	111.82	4th	Did not start		111.82	4th	123.70	2nd	124.81	3rd place, bronze medalist(s)
Gerónimo Cortéz	Men's K-1	101.26	4th	98.79	4th	98.79	4th	97.77	4th	108.66	6th
María Sol Cassini	Women's C-1	327.56	5th	319.81	4th	319.81	4th	221.33	4th	325.10	4th
María Luz Cassini	Women's K-1	110.51	4th	220.90	5th	110.51	4th	142.77	4th	123.29	4th

=== Sprint ===
Argentina qualified 11 athletes in the sprint discipline (6 in men's kayak and 5 in women's kayak).

Men

Athlete	Event	Heats		Semifinals		Final	
Athlete	Event	Time	Rank	Time	Rank	Time	Rank
Rubén Rézola	K-1 200 m	36.289	1 QF	—N/a		36.674	4th
Daniel Dal Bo	K-1 1000 m	—N/a				3:42.019	2nd place, silver medalist(s)
Rubén Rézola; Ezequiel Di Giácomo	K-2 200 m	—N/a				33.955	1st place, gold medalist(s)
Pablo de Torres; Gonzalo Carreras	K-2 1000 m	—N/a				3:27.240	2nd place, silver medalist(s)
Daniel Dal Bo; Gonzalo Carreras; Juan Cáceres; Pablo de Torres	K-4 1000 m	—N/a				3:02.079	3rd place, bronze medalist(s)
Facundo Pagiola	C-1 200 m	46.315	5 SF	46.585	4	did not advance	
Facundo Pagiolia	C-1 1000 m	—N/a				4:36.815	6th

Women

Athlete	Event	Heats		Semifinals		Final	
Athlete	Event	Time	Rank	Time	Rank	Time	Rank
Sabrina Ameghino	K-1 200 m	44.493	1 QF	—N/a		44.759	3rd place, bronze medalist(s)
Martina Isequilla	K-1 500 m	2:00.098	3 QF	—N/a		2:11.145	5th
Sabrina Ameghino; Alexandra Keresztesi	K-2 500 m	—N/a				1:49.485	2nd place, silver medalist(s)
Sabrina Ameghino; Alexandra Keresztesi; María Garro; Brenda Rojas	K-4 500 m	—N/a				1:37.721	3rd place, bronze medalist(s)

Qualification Legend: QF = Qualify to final; QS = Qualify to semifinal

== Cycling ==
Argentina qualified a team of 21 athletes.

=== BMX ===
Men

Athlete	Event	Seeding		Quarterfinal							Semifinal		Final	
Athlete	Event	Seeding		Run 1		Run 2		Run 3		Qualifying	Semifinal		Final	
Athlete	Event	Time	Points	Time	Points	Time	Points	Time	Points	Points	Time	Rank	Time	Rank
Ramiro Marino Carlomagno	Men's BMX	37.023	4th	37.331	1	37.699	2	38.626	3	6 Q	37.864	5	Did not advance	
Gonzalo Molina	Men's BMX	36.944	3rd	37.557	3	37.633	2	37.037	3	8 Q	37.350	2 Q	40.574	6th

Women

Athlete	Event	Seeding		Semifinal							Final	
Athlete	Event	Seeding		Run 1		Run 2		Run 3		Qualifying	Final	
Athlete	Event	Time	Points	Time	Points	Time	Points	Time	Points	Points	Time	Rank
Gabriela Díaz	Women's BMX	41.966	4th	41.589	2	41.067	2	41.498	2	6 Q	50.145	5th
Mariana Díaz	Women's BMX	42.100	5th	42.104	3	41.746	3	42.864	4	10 Q	42.611	3rd place, bronze medalist(s)

=== Mountain biking ===
Athlete	Event	Time	Rank
Luciano Caraccioli	Men's cross-country	1:39:26	11th
Catriel Soto	Men's cross-country	1:32:04	2nd place, silver medalist(s)
Agustina Apaza	Women's cross-country	Did not finish	
Noelia Rodríguez Margaria	Women's cross-country	Did not start	

=== Road cycling ===
Men

Athlete	Event	Final	
Athlete	Event	Time	Rank
Laureano Rosas	Road race	Did not finish	
Alejandro Durán	Road race	Did not finish	
Maximiliano Richeze	Road race	3:52:04	27th
Mauro Richeze	Road race	3:46:26	4th
Laureano Rosas	Time trial	47:56.52	6th
Alejandro Durán	Time trial	49:43.52	13th

Women

Athlete	Event	Final	
Athlete	Event	Time	Rank
Irma Greve	Road race	2:07:51	5th
Mariela Delgado	Road race	2:07:54	22nd
Irma Greve	Time trial	29:42.16	11th
Mariela Delgado	Time trial	30:42.37	13th

=== Track cycling ===
Keirin

Athlete	Event	1st round	Final
Athlete	Event	Rank	Rank
Leandro Bottasso	Men's keirin	3rd	4th
Deborah Coronel	Women's keirin	5th	9th

Sprint

Athlete	Event	Qualification		Round of 16	Repechage 1	Quarterfinals	Semifinals	Final	
Athlete	Event	Time	Rank	Opposition Time	Opposition Time	Opposition Time	Opposition Time	Opposition Time	Rank
Leandro Bottasso	Men's sprint	10.373	11th	F Puerta (COL); L 10.795	F Fonseca Da Silva (BRA); S Ramírez (COL); L 10.675	Did not advance			
Deborah Coronel	Women's sprint	12.318	11th	K O'Brien (CAN); L 11.887	F Fong (MEX); M Jimenez Galicia (GUA); L 12.004	Did not advance			

Omnium

Athlete	Event	Scratch race	Individual pursuit		Elimination race	Time trial		Flying lap		Points race		Total points	Rank
Athlete	Event	Points	Time	Points	Points	Time	Points	Points	Points	Points	Rank	Total points	Rank
Maximiliano Richeze	Men's omnium	36	4:34.279	32	26	1:04.882	38	13.687	34	35	35	201	4th
Irma Greve	Women's omnium	40	3:41.534	34	28	36.991	34	14.835	32	22	22	190	4th

Team pursuit and sprint

Athlete	Event	Qualification		Semifinals		Final	
Athlete	Event	Time	Rank	Opponent results	Rank	Opponent results	Rank
Maximiliano Richeze; Mauro Richeze; Mauro Agostini; Walter Pérez; Adrián Richeze	Men's team pursuit	4:07.092	2nd	Canada; W 4:08.084	1st	Colombia; L 4:05.429	2nd place, silver medalist(s)
Leandro Bottasso; Maximiliano Richeze; Mauro Agostini	Men's team sprint	48.861	7th	—N/a		Did not advance	
Deborah Coronel; Irma Greve	Women's team sprint	36.921	6th	—N/a		Did not advance	

== Equestrian ==
Argentina qualified a team of 12 athletes.

Dressage

Argentina qualified a full dressage team.

Athlete	Horse	Event	Grand Prix		Grand Prix Special		Grand Prix Freestyle	
Athlete	Horse	Event	Score	Rank	Score	Rank	Score	Rank
Hugo Lopardo Grana	Tyra	Individual	63.200	31st	62.980	30th	Did not advance	
Micaela Mabragana	Granada	Individual	67.220	20th	65.667	25th	Did not advance	
María Manfredi	Bandurria Kacero	Individual	68.658	17th	69.369	13th	70.725	13th
María Ugalde	Caquel Cautivo	Individual	60.632	40th	61.421	40th	Did not advance	
Hugo Lopardo Grana; Micaela Mabragana; María Manfredi; María Ugalde	See above	Team	202.078	5th	201.016	5th	—N/a	

Eventing

Argentina qualified a full eventing team.

Athlete	Horse	Event	Dressage		Cross-country		Jumping		Total	
Athlete	Horse	Event	Penalties	Rank	Penalties	Rank	Penalties	Rank	Penalties	Rank
Juan Gallo	Remonta Nunhil	Individual	70.50	40th	27.60	25th	8.00	25th	106.10	27th
José Ortelli	Jos Cassius	Individual	54.30	16th	Eliminated					
Marcelo Rawson	Larthago	Individual	56.40	18th	Eliminated					
Luciano Brunello	Erevan	Individual	65.30	35th	16.00	22nd	4.00	19th	85.30	20th
Juan Gallo; José Ortelli; Marcelo Rawson; Luciano Brunello	See above	Team	176.00	7th	1043.60	9th	12.00	8th	1191.40	9th

Jumping

Argentina qualified a full jumping team.

Individual

Athlete	Horse	Event	Qualifying round								Final					
Athlete	Horse	Event	Round 1		Round 2			Round 3			Round A		Round B		Total	
Athlete	Horse	Event	Penalties	Rank	Penalties	Total	Rank	Penalties	Total	Rank	Penalties	Rank	Penalties	Rank	Penalties	Rank
José María Larocca	Cornet Du Lys	Individual	1	31st	1	2	4th	1	3	3rd	0	1st	4	8th	4	4th
Ramiro Quintana	Whitney	Individual	4	33rd	5	9	20th	0	9	21st	Did not advance					
Luis Birabén	Abunola	Individual	0	1st	0	0	1st	5	5	4th	4	4th	0	1st	4	7th
Matías Albarracín	Cannavaro 9	Individual	0	1st	1	1	4th	6	7	18th	4	4th	1	7th	5	8th

Team

Athlete	Horse	Event	Qualifying round		Final					
Athlete	Horse	Event	Qualifying round		Round 1		Round 2		Total	
Athlete	Horse	Event	Penalties	Rank	Penalties	Rank	Penalties	Rank	Penalties	Rank
José María Larocca; Ramiro Quintana; Luis Birabén; Matías Albarracín	See above	Team	1	6th	2	2nd	6	3rd	8	2nd place, silver medalist(s)

== Fencing ==
Argentina qualified 14 fencers (7 men, 7 women).

Men

Athlete	Event	Pool Round		Round of 16	Quarterfinals	Semifinals	Final / BM	
Athlete	Event	Result	Seed	Opposition Score	Opposition Score	Opposition Score	Opposition Score	Rank
José Domínguez	Épée	2 V	13th	F Limardo (VEN); W 10–9	A Schwantes (BRA); W 15–6	H Boisvert-Simard (CAN); W 15–11	R Limardo Gascon (VEN); L 6–15	2nd place, silver medalist(s)
Alessandro Taccani	Épée	2 V	11th	R Rodriguez Juarez (MEX); W 15–11	J Pryor (USA); L 7–15	Did not advance		
José Domínguez; Jesús Lugones Ruggeri; Alessandro Taccani	Épée Team	—N/a			Colombia; L 31–45	5th–8th place match Mexico; L 33–45	7th–8th place match Brazil; L 36–45	8th
Felipe Saucedo	Foil	2 V	11th	G Perrier (BRA); L 8–15	Did not advance			
Ricardo Bustamante	Sabre	5 V	1st	S Cuellar Pena (COL); W 15–12	N Montalvo (CUB); W 15–6	E Dershwitz (USA); L 4–15	Did not advance	3rd place, bronze medalist(s)
Stefano Lucchetti	Sabre	3 V	3rd	J Ayala Navarrete (MEX); L 7–15	Did not advance			
Ricardo Bustamante; Stefano Lucchetti; Pascual Di Tella	Sabre Team	—N/a			Brazil; W 45–42	United States; L 25–45	Venezuela; W 45–42	3rd place, bronze medalist(s)

Women

Athlete	Event	Pool Round		Round of 16	Quarterfinals	Semifinals	Final / BM	
Athlete	Event	Result	Seed	Opposition Score	Opposition Score	Opposition Score	Opposition Score	Rank
Elida Agüero	Épée	2 V	15th	Isabel Di Tella (ARG); L 7–15	Did not advance			
Isabel Di Tella	Épée	4 V	2nd	E Agüero (ARG); W 15–7	K Holmes (USA); L 6–15	Did not advance		
Elida Agüero; Isabel Di Tella; María Duenas Nicolau	Épée Team	—N/a			Brazil; L 39–45	5th–8th place match Dominican Republic; L 38–45	7th–8th place match Colombia; L 39–45	8th
Alejandra Carbone	Foil	0 V	18th	Did not advance				
Flavia Mormandi	Foil	3 V	9th	G Cecchini (BRA); L 5–15	Did not advance			
Alejandra Carbone; Flavia Mormandi; Maria Terni	Foil Team	—N/a			Canada; L 24–45	5th–8th place match Venezuela; L 40–45	7th–8th place match Colombia; W 45–38	7th
María Belén Pérez Maurice	Sabre	3 V	6th	J Toledo Ames (MEX); W 15–11	R Felix Lara (DOM); W 15–6	A Benítez (VEN); L 14–15	Did not advance	3rd place, bronze medalist(s)

== Field hockey ==
Argentina qualified both a men's and women's teams for a total of 32 athletes (16 men and 16 women).

Men's tournament

The following is Argentina's men's field hockey squad for the 2015 Pan American Games.

Head Coach: Carlos Retegui

1. Juan Manuel Vivaldi
2. Gonzalo Peillat
4. Juan Gilardi
5. Pedro Ibarra
7. Facundo Callioni
10. Matías Paredes
11. Joaquin Menini
12. Lucas Vila
16. Ignacio Ortiz
17. Juan Martín López
19. Nicolas Della Torre
20. Isidoro Ibarra
22. Matias Rey
24. Manuel Brunet
26. Agustin Mazzili
27. Lucas Rossi

Pool A

Pos	Team	Pld	W	D	L	GF	GA	GD	Pts	Qualification
1	Argentina	3	3	0	0	22	4	+18	9	Quarter-finals
2	United States	3	1	1	1	5	10	−5	4	Quarter-finals
3	Cuba	3	0	2	1	9	10	−1	2	Quarter-finals
4	Trinidad and Tobago	3	0	1	2	3	15	−12	1	Quarter-finals

Source: FIH
Rules for classification: 1) points; 2) matches won; 3) goal difference; 4) goals for; 5) head-to-head result.

14 July 2015
09:00

Argentina	11–0	Trinidad and Tobago
Peillat 26', 57'; Vila 29', 30', 34'; Paredes 37'; Della Torre 42'; Mazzili 56'; Callioni 57', 60'; Menini 59'	Report

Umpires:
You Suolong (CHN)
Federico Garcia (URU)

16 July 2015
11:00

United States	0–6	Argentina
	Report	Mazzili 15'; Brunet 19'; Peillat 38', 47'; Callioni 41'; Della Torre 54'

Umpires:
Francisco Vázquez (ESP)
Gavin Caldecott (CAN)

18 July 2015
09:00

Argentina	5–4	Cuba
Vila 18'; Peillat 28', 37', 55'; Menini 29'	Report	Blanco 21'; Veitia 47', 57'; Aguilera 52'

Umpires:
Gavin Caldecott (CAN)
Matias Barbosa (CHI)

Quarterfinal

21 July 2015
09:00

Argentina	12–0	Mexico
Brunet 2'; Peillat 7', 28', 30', 59'; Paredes 18', 39'; Vila 20', 31', 51'; Gilardi 39'; Mazzili 56'	Report

Umpires:
Saleem Aaron (USA)
Matias Barbosa (CHI)

Semifinal

23 July 2015
17:00

Argentina	6–0	Chile
Vila 6'; Peillat 30', 42', 44'; Paredes 44'; Brunet 60'	Report

Umpires:
Suolong You (CHN)
Federico Garcia (URU)

Gold medal Match

25 July 2015
19:00

(gold) Argentina	3–0	Canada (silver)
Ibarra 25'; Vila 33'; Brunet 47'	Report

Umpires:
Francisco Vázquez (ESP)
Federico Garcia (URU)

2015 Pan American Games Gold medal

Argentina

Women's tournament

The Argentine field hockey women's team that will compete at the 2015 Pan American Games:

- Belén Succi
- Macarena Rodríguez
- Jimena Cedrés
- Martina Cavallero
- Delfina Merino
- Agustina Habif
- Florencia Habif
- Rocío Sánchez Moccia
- Agustina Albertario
- Luciana Molina
- Pilar Romang
- Paula Ortiz
- Noel Barrionuevo
- Julia Gomes Fantasia
- Josefina Sruoga
- Florencia Mutio

Pool A

Pos	Team	Pld	W	D	L	GF	GA	GD	Pts	Qualification
1	Argentina	3	3	0	0	26	0	+26	9	Quarterfinals
2	Canada	3	2	0	1	16	6	+10	6	Quarterfinals
3	Mexico	3	0	1	2	1	14	−13	1	Quarterfinals
4	Dominican Republic	3	0	1	2	2	25	−23	1	Quarterfinals

Source: FIH
Rules for classification: 1) points; 2) goal difference; 3) goals scored; 4) head-to-head result.

13 July 2015
17:00

Argentina	9–0	Mexico
Merino 7', 22'; Ortiz 10'; Barrionuevo 21', 35'; Albertarrio 24', 26'; Habif 36'; Rodríguez 58'	Report

Umpires:
Suzi Sutton (USA)
Aleesha Unka (NZL)

15 July 2015
19:00

Canada	0–5	Argentina
	Report	Barrionuevo 8'; Gomes Fantasia 24'; F. Habif 29'; Albertarrio 38'; Merino 51'

Umpires:
Aleesha Unka (NZL)
Ayanna McClean (TTO)

17 July 2015
17:00

Argentina	12–0	Dominican Republic
Barrionuevo 4', 12'; Albertarrio 15'; Romang 18', 29'; Sánchez Moccia 19', 48'; Rodríguez 24'; Merino 27'; Ortiz 31'; Gomes Fantasia 32'; Molina 59'	Report

Umpires:
Camila Cabargas (CHI)
Stephanie Judefind (USA)

Quarterfinal

20 July 2015
09:00

Argentina	10–0	Cuba
Sánchez Moccia 5', 52'; Barrionuevo 15', 17', 22', 43', 51'; Romang 20'; F. Habif 24'; Molina 25'	Report

Umpires:
Suzi Sutton (USA)
Meghan McLennan (CAN)

Semifinal

22 July 2015
17:00

Argentina	5–0	Chile
Cavallero 6', 8'; Albertarrio 37'; Merino 44', 48'	Report

Umpires:
Michelle Joubert (RSA)
Suzi Sutton (USA)

Gold medal Match

24 July 2015
19:30

(silver) Argentina	1–2	United States (gold)
F. Habif 58'	Report	K. Reinprecht 34'; Vittese 40'

Umpires:
Aleesha Unka (NZL)
Ayanna McClean (TTO)

2015 Pan American Games Silver medal

Argentina

== Football ==
Argentina qualified a women's team of 18 athletes.

Women's tournament

Head coach: (Argentina) Julio Olarticoechea

No.	Pos.	Player	Date of birth (age)	Club
1	GK	Elisabeth Minnig	6 January 1987 (aged 28)	(Argentine Football Association) Boca Juniors
12	GK	Gaby Garton	27 May 1990 (aged 25)	(Argentine Football Association) River Plate
2	DF	Agustina Barroso	20 May 1993 (aged 22)	(Argentine Football Association) UAI Urquiza
3	DF	Alana García	1 March 1989 (aged 26)	(Argentine Football Association) UAI Urquiza
4	DF	Noelia Espíndola	6 April 1992 (aged 23)	(Argentine Football Association) San Lorenzo
5	MF	Florencia Quiñones	26 August 1986 (aged 28)	(Royal Spanish Football Federation) FC Barcelona
6	DF	Cecilia Ghigo	16 January 1995 (aged 20)	(Argentine Football Association) Boca Juniors
7	MF	Yael Oviedo	22 May 1992 (aged 23)	(Brazilian Football Confederation) Foz Cataratas
8	MF	Vanesa Santana	3 September 1990 (aged 24)	(Argentine Football Association) Boca Juniors
9	FW	Mariana Larroquette	24 October 1992 (aged 22)	(Argentine Football Association) River Plate
10	FW	Florencia Bonsegundo	14 July 1993 (aged 21)	(Argentine Football Association) UAI Urquiza
11	MF	Sole Jaimes	20 January 1989 (aged 26)	(Brazilian Football Confederation) Foz Cataratas
13	DF	Carmen Brusca	7 December 1985 (aged 29)	(Argentine Football Association) Boca Juniors
14	DF	Adriana Sachs	25 December 1993 (aged 21)	(Argentine Football Association) Club Atlético Huracán
15	DF	Camila Gómez Ares	26 October 1994 (aged 20)	(Argentine Football Association) Boca Juniors
16	MF	Karen Vénica	25 January 1992 (aged 23)	(Argentine Football Association) UAI Urquiza
17	FW	Fabiana Vallejos (c)	30 July 1985 (aged 29)	(Argentine Football Association) Boca Juniors
18	FW	Belén Potassa	12 December 1988 (aged 26)	(Argentine Football Association) UAI Urquiza

Group A

Pos	Team	Pld	W	D	L	GF	GA	GD	Pts	Qualification
1	Colombia	3	2	1	0	4	1	+3	7	Medal round
2	Mexico	3	2	0	1	6	3	+3	6	Medal round
3	Trinidad and Tobago	3	0	2	1	4	6	−2	2	
4	Argentina	3	0	1	2	3	7	−4	1	

Source: Toronto 2015
July 11, 2015
14:05

Argentina	2–2	Trinidad and Tobago
Larroquette 52'; Potassa 88'	Report	Shade 59'; Attin-Johnson 90'

Hamilton Pan Am Soccer Stadium, Hamilton
Referee: Mirian Leon (El Salvador)

July 14, 2015
17:35

Argentina	1–3	Mexico
Bonsegundo 82'	Report	Noyola 1'; Rangel 73'; Ruiz 76'

Hamilton Pan Am Soccer Stadium, Hamilton
Referee: Marianela Cruz (Costa Rica)

July 18, 2015
20:35

Argentina	0–2	Colombia
	Report	Arias 44'; Usme 51'

Hamilton Pan Am Soccer Stadium, Hamilton
Referee: Alondra Arellano (Mexico)

== Golf ==
Argentina qualified four athletes.

Athlete(s)	Event	Final					
Athlete(s)	Event	Round 1	Round 2	Round 3	Round 4	Total	Rank
Tomás Cocha	Men's individual	73; 14th	69; 4th	67; 2nd	67; 1st	276	2nd place, silver medalist(s)
Alejandro Tosti	Men's individual	65; 1st	79; 28th	68; 3rd	72; 12th	284	7th
Delfina Acosta	Women's individual	80; 19th	73; 7th	76; 15th	77; 19th	306	15th
Manuela Carbajo Re	Women's individual	74; 7th	76; 14th	74; 8th	81; 24th	305	14th
Manuela Carbajo Re; Tomás Cocha; Alejandro Tosti; Delfina Acosta	Mixed team	139; 2nd	142; 5th	141; 3rd	144; 4th	566	3rd place, bronze medalist(s)

== Gymnastics ==
Argentina qualified eleven gymnasts.

=== Artistic ===
Men
Team Final & Individual Qualification

Argentina qualified three male artistic gymnasts.

Athlete	Event	Apparatus						Qualification		Final	
Athlete	Event	F	PH	R	V	PB	HB	Total	Rank	Total	Rank
Nicolás Córdoba	Individual	13.800	12.950	12.950	13.450	13.550	14.100	80.800	14th	—N/a	
Osvaldo Martínez Erazun	Individual	13.450	11.650	12.500	13.550	14.550	13.850	79.550	16th	—N/a	
Federico Molinari	Individual	13.500	11.100	15.150	14.350	13.200	12.800	80.100	15th	—N/a	
Total	Team	40.750	35.700	40.600	41.350	41.300	40.750	—N/a		240.450	8th

Individual Finals

Athlete	Event	Final							
Athlete	Event	Vault	Floor	Pommel horse	Rings	Parallel bars	Horizontal bar	Total	Rank
Federico Molinari	Individual Rings	—N/a			15.200	—N/a		15.200	5th

Women
Team Finals & Individual Qualification

Argentina qualified a full women's artistic team of five gymnasts.

Athlete	Event	Apparatus				Qualification		Final	
Athlete	Event	F	V	UB	BB	Total	Rank	Total	Rank
Camila Ambrosio	Individual	—N/a	13.600	12.000	12.400	38.000	34th	—N/a	
Merlina Galera	Individual	11.700	13.300	—N/a	12.450	37.450	38th	—N/a	
María Belén Stoffel	Individual	11.600	—N/a	12.000	—N/a	23.600	52nd	—N/a	
Ayelén Tarabini	Individual	13.800	13.300	12.300	12.200	51.600	13th	—N/a	
Ailén Valente	Individual	13.150	13.750	12.000	11.750	50.650	19th	—N/a	
Total	Team	38.650	40.650	36.300	37.050	—N/a		152.650	8th

Individual Finals

Athlete	Event	Final					
Athlete	Event	F	V	UB	BB	Total	Rank
Ayelén Taribini	Individual All-around	11.300	13.150	12.400	13.300	50.150	15th
Ailén Valente	Individual All-around	12.400	13.650	13.200	12.800	52.050	12th

=== Rhythmic ===
Argentina qualified two athletes.

Individual

Athlete	Event	Final					
Athlete	Event	Hoop	Ball	Clubs	Ribbon	Total	Rank
Micaela Herbon	Individual	11.550	10.392	9.167	9.125	40.234	16th
Karen Pereira de la Rosa	Individual	11.758	10.242	11.167	9.633	42.800	15th

Qualification Legend: Q = Qualified to apparatus final

=== Trampoline ===
Argentina qualified two trampoline gymnasts.

Athlete	Event	Qualification		Final	
Athlete	Event	Score	Rank	Score	Rank
Lucas Adorno	Men's	97.870	7th	54.525	5th
Mara Colombo	Women's	79.915	5th	45.835	7th

== Handball ==
Argentina qualified a men's and a women's team. Each team consisted of 15 athletes, for a total of 30.

=== Men's tournament ===
The Argentine handball men's team that will compete at the 2015 Pan American Games:

Head coach: (Argentina) Eduardo Gallardo

No.	Pos.	Name	Date of birth (age)	Height	App.	Goals	Club
1	GK	Matías Schulz	12 February 1982 (age 44)	1.90 m	107	3	(France) Nantes
2	LW	Federico Fernández	17 October 1989 (age 36)	1.87 m	94	302	(Argentina) UNLu
3	RW	Federico Pizarro	6 July 1986 (age 40)	1.83 m	67	232	(Argentina) UNLu
4	CB	Sebastián Simonet (c)	12 May 1986 (age 40)	1.90 m	130	394	(France) US Ivry
5	P	Pablo Sebastián Portela	21 June 1980 (age 46)	1.90 m	129	60	(Argentina) River Plate
6	CB	Diego Simonet	26 December 1989 (age 36)	1.89 m	74	320	(France) Montpellier
8	LB	Pablo Simonet	4 May 1992 (age 34)	1.89 m	41	75	(France) US Ivry
9	RB	Leonardo Facundo Querín	17 April 1982 (age 44)	1.97 m	152	230	(France) Billère
10	RB	Federico Matías Vieyra	21 July 1988 (age 38)	1.92 m	94	203	(France) Istres
12	GK	Fernando Gabriel García	31 August 1981 (age 44)	1.90 m	186	5	(France) Vernon
13	LB	Juan Pablo Fernández	30 September 1988 (age 37)	1.90 m	103	154	(Argentina) UNLu
15	P	Gonzalo Carou	15 August 1979 (age 46)	1.94 m	174	353	(France) Istres
17	RB	Damián Migueles	24 November 1983 (age 42)	1.92 m	91		(Argentina) River Plate
18	LW	Adrián Portela	8 March 1986 (age 40)	1.83 m	30	104	(Argentina) River Plate
20	P	Sergio Crevatin	28 May 1980 (age 46)	1.87 m	112	153	(Argentina) SAG LOMAS

Group B

Team	Pld	W	D	L	GF	GA	GD	Pts	Qualification
Argentina	3	3	0	0	103	63	+40	6	Qualified for the Semifinals
Chile	3	1	1	1	87	84	+3	3	Qualified for the Semifinals
Cuba	3	1	1	1	87	89	−2	3	
Puerto Rico	3	0	0	3	68	109	−41	0	

July 17; 18:30	Argentina	35–18	Cuba	Exhibition Centre – Hall B Referees: Pinto, Menezes (BRA)
July 17; 18:30	Fernandez, Pizarro 8	(19–10)	Balazquez 7	Exhibition Centre – Hall B Referees: Pinto, Menezes (BRA)
July 17; 18:30	3× (yellow card) 5× (suspension)	report	2× (yellow card) 6× (suspension)	Exhibition Centre – Hall B Referees: Pinto, Menezes (BRA)

July 19; 18:30	Puerto Rico	22–38	Argentina	Exhibition Centre – Hall B Referees: Lemes, Sosa (URU)
July 19; 18:30	Mercado 7	(8–18)	Fernandez 8	Exhibition Centre – Hall B Referees: Lemes, Sosa (URU)
July 19; 18:30	2× (yellow card) 4× (suspension)	report	4× (yellow card) 3× (suspension)	Exhibition Centre – Hall B Referees: Lemes, Sosa (URU)

July 21; 20:30	Argentina	30–23	Chile	Exhibition Centre – Hall B Referees: Pinto, Menezes (BRA)
July 21; 20:30	Fernandez, Vieyra 8	(20–12)	Araya 7	Exhibition Centre – Hall B Referees: Pinto, Menezes (BRA)
July 21; 20:30	3× (yellow card) 6× (suspension) 2× (red card)	report	3× (yellow card) 4× (suspension) 1× (red card)	Exhibition Centre – Hall B Referees: Pinto, Menezes (BRA)

Semifinal

July 23; 20:30	Uruguay	12–20	Argentina	Exhibition Centre – Hall B Referees: Zuñiga, Reyes (CUB)
July 23; 20:30	Gamiz 3	(7–7)	Simonet 10	Exhibition Centre – Hall B Referees: Zuñiga, Reyes (CUB)
July 23; 20:30	2× (yellow card) 6× (suspension)	report	3× (yellow card) 3× (suspension)	Exhibition Centre – Hall B Referees: Zuñiga, Reyes (CUB)

Gold medal Match

July 25
20:00
(gold) Brazil
29–27 (ET)
Argentina (silver)
Exhibition Centre – Hall B
Referees: Gjeding, Hansen (DEN)
Hubner, Santos 6
(9–11)
Fernandez 8
3× (yellow card) 5× (suspension) 1× (red card)
report
2× (yellow card) 2× (suspension)

FT: 24–24 ET: 5–3

2015 Pan American Games Silver medal

Argentina

=== Women's tournament ===
The Argentine women's handball team that will compete at the 2015 Pan American Games:

Head coach: Eduardo Peruchena

No.	Pos.	Name	Date of birth (age)	Height	App.	Goals	Club
1	GK	Marisol Carratu	15 July 1986 (aged 29)	1.74 m	81	1	(Argentina) Ferro Oeste
4	RB	Lucía Haro	21 August 1986 (aged 28)	1.78 m	43	65	(Argentina) Unión Eléctrica
5	LW	Manuela Pizzo	13 November 1991 (aged 23)	1.77 m	19	22	(Brazil) AD Blumenau
6	LW	Luciana Salvado	13 April 1990 (aged 25)	1.69 m	63		(Argentina) Ferro Oeste
7	LB	Rocio Campigli	6 August 1994 (aged 20)	1.73 m	13		(Argentina) Estudiantes
8	LB	Amelia Belotti	17 November 1988 (aged 26)	1.80 m	44	65	(Argentina) Italia Handball
9	RB	Luciana Mendoza	14 March 1990 (aged 25)	1.70 m	51	78	(Brazil) AD Blumenau
10	CB	Victoria Crivelli	30 September 1990 (aged 24)	1.76 m	31	40	(Argentina) Ferro Oeste
11	RW	Antonella Gambino	26 March 1990 (aged 25)	1.64 m	16	25	(Argentina) Argentinos Juniors
12	GK	Valentina Kogan	19 March 1980 (aged 35)	1.73 m	100		(Argentina) Vilo
14	LB	Valeria Bianchi	16 September 1985 (aged 29)	1.70 m	53	50	(Argentina) NS Lujan
15	P	Antonela Mena	28 March 1988 (aged 27)	1.82 m	61	60	(Argentina) CID Moreno
18	LB	Macarena Sans	20 November 1996 (aged 18)		16		(Argentina) Mendoza
21	LB	Macarena Gandulfo	3 November 1993 (aged 21)	1.74 m	22		(Argentina) Sedalo
22	CB	Elke Karsten	15 May 1995 (aged 20)	1.75 m	5	14	(Argentina) AACF Quilmes

Group B

Team	Pld	W	D	L	GF	GA	GD	Pts	Qualification
Argentina	3	2	0	1	75	60	+15	4	Qualified for the Semifinals
Uruguay	3	2	0	1	80	74	+6	4	Qualified for the Semifinals
Cuba	3	2	0	1	83	83	0	4	
Chile	3	0	0	3	69	90	−21	0	

July 16; 18:30	Argentina	20–15	Uruguay	Exhibition Centre – Hall B Referees: Pinto, Menezes (BRA)
July 16; 18:30	Mendoza 6	(13–7)	Barreiro 9	Exhibition Centre – Hall B Referees: Pinto, Menezes (BRA)
July 16; 18:30	3× (yellow card) 2× (suspension)	report	3× (yellow card) 5× (suspension)	Exhibition Centre – Hall B Referees: Pinto, Menezes (BRA)

July 18; 18:30	Cuba	27–25	Argentina	Exhibition Centre – Hall B Referees: Martin Gjeding, Mads Hansen (DEN)
July 18; 18:30	Lusson 14	(14–13)	Mendoza 9	Exhibition Centre – Hall B Referees: Martin Gjeding, Mads Hansen (DEN)
July 18; 18:30	1× (yellow card) 8× (suspension)	Report	3× (yellow card) 2× (suspension)	Exhibition Centre – Hall B Referees: Martin Gjeding, Mads Hansen (DEN)

July 20; 20:30	Argentina	30–18	Chile	Exhibition Centre – Hall B Referees: Zuñiga, Reyes (CUB)
July 20; 20:30	Mendoza 6	(15–10)	three players 3	Exhibition Centre – Hall B Referees: Zuñiga, Reyes (CUB)
July 20; 20:30	3× (yellow card) 1× (suspension)	report	4× (yellow card) 3× (suspension)	Exhibition Centre – Hall B Referees: Zuñiga, Reyes (CUB)

Semifinal

July 22; 20:30	Mexico	16–27	Argentina	Exhibition Centre – Hall B Referees: Gjeding, Hansen (DEN)
July 22; 20:30	Jaramillo, Sifuentes 4	(6–11)	Pizzo 7	Exhibition Centre – Hall B Referees: Gjeding, Hansen (DEN)
July 22; 20:30	3× (yellow card) 3× (suspension)	report	3× (yellow card) 5× (suspension)	Exhibition Centre – Hall B Referees: Gjeding, Hansen (DEN)

Gold medal Match

July 24; 20:00	(gold) Brazil	25–20	Argentina (silver)	Exhibition Centre – Hall B Referees: Lemes, Sosa (URU)
July 24; 20:00	Nascimento 6	(12–12)	Mendoza, Karsten 5	Exhibition Centre – Hall B Referees: Lemes, Sosa (URU)
July 24; 20:00	3× (yellow card) 5× (suspension)	report	3× (yellow card) 2× (suspension)	Exhibition Centre – Hall B Referees: Lemes, Sosa (URU)

2015 Pan American Games Silver medal

Argentina

== Judo ==
Argentina qualified a team of eleven judokas.

Men

Athlete	Event	Round of 16	Quarterfinals	Semifinals	Repechage	Final / BM	
Athlete	Event	Opposition Result	Opposition Result	Opposition Result	Opposition Result	Opposition Result	Rank
Hernán Birbrier	−60 kg	—N/a	Y Torres (CUB); L 0–100	—N/a	J Futtinico (COL); L 000S1–100	Did not advance	7th
Fernando González	−66 kg	—N/a	A Bouchard (CAN); L 000S2–100	—N/a	B Boren (USA); W 101–001	S Mattey (VEN); W 100–001	3rd place, bronze medalist(s)
Alejandro Clara	−73 kg	—N/a	F Ibanez (ECU); W 010S2–000S2	W Pombo Silva (BRA); W 000S2–000S3	—N/a	M Estrada (CUB); L 000S1–000	2nd place, silver medalist(s)
Emmanuel Lucenti	−81 kg	—N/a	Disqualified				
Christian Schmidt	−90 kg	—N/a	J Romero (URU); W 101–000	T Camilo (BRA); L 000S4–110S1	—N/a	J Larsen (USA); L 010S1–010	5th
Héctor Campos Bermúdez	−100 kg	—N/a	J Esquivel (MEX); W 000S1–000S2	L Corrêa (BRA); L 000–100	—N/a	M Bueno (URU); W 100–000S1	3rd place, bronze medalist(s)

Women

Athlete	Event	Round of 16	Quarterfinals	Semifinals	Repechage	Final / BM	
Athlete	Event	Opposition Result	Opposition Result	Opposition Result	Opposition Result	Opposition Result	Rank
Paula Pareto	−48 kg	—N/a	I Sanchez (DOM); W 100–000	N Brigida (BRA); W 000S1–000S2	—N/a	D Mestre (CUB); L 000S1–010S1	2nd place, silver medalist(s)
Abi Cardozo	−52 kg	—N/a	D Díaz (ECU); L 000S2–001S1	—N/a	M García (DOM); L 000–101	Did not advance	7th
Gabriela Narváez	−57 kg	—N/a	R Silva (BRA); L 000S1–011S1	—N/a	A Ojeda (CUB); L 000–100	Did not advance	7th
Virginia Laffeuillade	-63 kg	S Tremblay (CAN); L 000–100	Did not advance				
Samantha Da Cunha Kessler	+78 kg	—N/a	V Zambotti (MEX); L 000S1–101	—N/a	E López (VEN); W 101S1–001S1	N Cutro-Kelly (USA); L 000S3–100S1	5th

== Karate ==
Argentina qualified 5 athletes.

Athlete	Event	Round robin				Semifinals	Final	
Athlete	Event	Opposition Result	Opposition Result	Opposition Result	Rank	Opposition Result	Opposition Result	Rank
Julián Pinzás	Men's 67 kg	M Noriega (CUB); W 9–1	I Santana (CHI); W 5–0	L Chung (CAN); W 4–0	1st	D Vargas (MEX); W 2–0	D Ferreras (DOM); W 2–2	1st place, gold medalist(s)
Franco Icasati	Men's 75 kg	T Scott (USA); L 2–4	E Espinoza (ECU); W 5–4	D Dubo (CHI); W 1–0	1st	A Nicastro (VEN); L 0–2	Did not advance	3rd place, bronze medalist(s)
Miguel Amargós	Men's 84 kg	M Andrade (BRA); W 7–1	A Loor (ECU); W 1–1	A Gutierrez (MEX); W 0–0	2nd	C Herrera (VEN); W 7–1	J Merino (ESA); W 3–1	1st place, gold medalist(s)
Franco Recouso	Men's +84 kg	A Aponte (VEN); Tied 1–1	B Irr (USA); L 0–8	J Tiril (CUB); L 2–10	4th	Did not advance		
Verónica Lugo	Women's +68 kg	V Echever (ECU); L 1–3	G Quintal (MEX); L 0–7	Y Pina Ordaz (VEN); L 0–3	4th	Did not advance		

== Modern pentathlon ==
Argentina qualified a team of 4 athletes (2 men and 2 women).

Men

Athlete	Event	Fencing (Épée One Touch)			Swimming (200m Freestyle)			Riding (Show Jumping)			Shooting/Running (10 m Air Pistol/3000m)			Total Points	Final Rank
Athlete	Event	Results	Rank	MP Points	Time	Rank	MP Points	Penalties	Rank	MP Points	Time	Rank	MP Points	Total Points	Final Rank
Sergio Villamayor	Men's	0 V	6th	234	2:19.72	22nd	281	65	20th	235	12:36.89	12th	544	1294	14th
Emmanuel Zapata	Men's	1 V	5th	235	2:06.37	9th	321	9	2nd	291	12:14.87	6th	566	1413	5th

Women

Athlete	Event	Fencing (Épée One Touch)			Swimming (200m Freestyle)			Riding (Show Jumping)			Shooting/Running (10 m Air Pistol/3000m)			Total Points	Final Rank
Athlete	Event	Results	Rank	MP Points	Time	Rank	MP Points	Penalties	Rank	MP Points	Time	Rank	MP Points	Total Points	Final Rank
Ayelén Zapata	Women's	0 V	16th	187	2:34.86	21st	236	61.73	1st	300	13:14.40	4th	506	1229	10th
Pamela Zapata	Women's	0 V	18th	178	2:24.70	15th	266	67.25	9th	290	13:19.72	5th	501	1235	9th

== Racquetball ==
Argentina qualified a team of two men and two women for a total of four athletes.

Men

Athlete	Event	Qualifying Round robin			Round of 16	Quarterfinals	Semifinals	Final	Rank
Athlete	Event	Match 1	Match 2	Rank	Opposition Result	Opposition Result	Opposition Result	Opposition Result	Rank
Daniel Maggi; Shai Manzuri	Doubles	A Beltrán (MEX); J Moreno (MEX); L 12–15, 15–14, 6–11	S Franco (COL); A Herrera (COL); L 15–4, 6–15, 7–11	3rd	C Wer (GUA); E Galicia (GUA); W 15–12, 15–14	V Gagnon (CAN); T Landeryou (CAN); L 14–15, 9–15	Did not advance		
Daniel Maggi; Shai Manzuri	Team	—N/a			Costa Rica; L 1–2, 2–0, 1–2	Did not advance			

Women

Athlete	Event	Qualifying Round robin				Round of 16	Quarterfinals	Semifinals	Final	Rank
Athlete	Event	Match 1	Match 2	Match 3	Rank	Opposition Result	Opposition Result	Opposition Result	Opposition Result	Rank
Veronique Guillemette	Singles	R Rajsich (USA); L 7–15, 9–15	C Muñoz (CHI); L w/o	C Loma (BOL); L w/o	4th	M Muñoz (ECU); L w/o	Did not advance			
María José Vargas	Singles	M Munoz (ECU); W 10–15, 15–9, 11–0	A Grisar (CHI); W 15–4, 15–0, 2-RET	F Lambert (CAN); L 9–15, 9–15	2nd	M Paredes (VEN); W 15–1, 15–11	S Salas (MEX); W 15–10, 15–7	M Sotomayor (ECU); W 15–7, 15–1	P Longoria (MEX); L 15–21, 15–9	2nd place, silver medalist(s)
María José Vargas; Veronique Guillemette	Doubles	R Rajsich (USA); K Russell (USA); L 12–15, 15–6, 7–11	A Martinez (GUA); M Rodriguez (GUA); W 15–8, 14–15, 11–3	—N/a	2nd	—N/a	C Amaya (COL); M Gomez (COL); W 15–12, 10–15, 11–7	R Rajsich (USA); K Russell (USA); W 15–7, 13–15, 11–6	P Longoria (MEX); S Salas (MEX); L 15–3, 15–4	2nd place, silver medalist(s)
María José Vargas; Veronique Guillemette	Team	—N/a					Canada; L 0–2, 0–2	Did not advance		

== Roller sports ==
Argentina qualified a team of 6 athletes (one man and woman for the figure skating events, and two men and two women for the speed skating events).

=== Figure skating ===
Athlete	Event	Short Program		Long Program		Total	
Athlete	Event	Result	Rank	Result	Rank	Result	Rank
Aníbal Frare	Men's free skating	129.10	2nd	121.60	4th	493.90	4th
Giselle Soler	Women's free skating	130.00	1st	129.90	1st	519.70	1st place, gold medalist(s)

=== Speed skating ===
Men

Athlete	Event	Semifinals		Final Time	Rank
Athlete	Event	Time	Rank	Final Time	Rank
Ezequiel Capellano	200 m time-trial	—N/a		16.989	5th
Ezequiel Capellano	500 m	39.025	2nd	40.909	2nd place, silver medalist(s)
Ken Kuwada	Men's 10,000 m	—N/a		6	5th

Women

Athlete	Event	Semifinals		Final Time/Points	Rank
Athlete	Event	Time	Rank	Final Time/Points	Rank
Rocío Berbel Alt	200 m time-trial	—N/a		18.315	4th
Rocío Berbel Alt	500 m	43.666	4th	Did not advance	
Maira Arias	Women's 10,000 m	—N/a		41	1st place, gold medalist(s)

== Rowing ==
Argentina qualified 13 boats.

Men

Athlete	Event	Heats		Repechage		Final	
Athlete	Event	Time	Rank	Time	Rank	Time	Rank
Brian Rosso	Single Sculls	7:16.26	2 R	7:30.03	1 FA	8:01.38	3rd place, bronze medalist(s)
Rodrigo Murillo; Cristian Rosso	Double Sculls	6:55.91	3 R	6:52.08	1 FA	6:33.59	2nd place, silver medalist(s)
Brian Rosso; Rodrigo Murillo; Cristian Rosso; Osvaldo Suárez	Quadruple Sculls	6:50.34	6 FA	—N/a		5:47.14	3rd place, bronze medalist(s)
Axel Haack; Diego López	Coxless Pair	6:52.30	4 R	7:12.44	4 FA	6:27.77	1st place, gold medalist(s)
Iván Carino; Agustín Díaz; Francisco Esteras; Joaquín Iwan	Coxless Four	6:26.97	2 FA	—N/a		6:16.52	3rd place, bronze medalist(s)
Pablo Aguirre; Agustín Campassi; Alejandro Colomino; Carlo Lauro Gracia	Lwt Coxless Four	6:02.74	1 FA	—N/a		6:56.27	4th
Axel Haack; Diego López; Rodrigo Murillo; Iván Carino; Agustín Díaz; Francisco Esteras; Osvaldo Suárez; Joel Infante; Joaquín Iwan	Eight	6:52.97	4 FA	—N/a		6:10.08	2nd place, silver medalist(s)

Women

Athlete	Event	Heats		Repechage		Final	
Athlete	Event	Time	Rank	Time	Rank	Time	Rank
Sofía Conte	Single Sculls	8:20.75	2 R	8:51.40	4 FA	7:52.61	5th
Lucía Palermo	Lwt Single Sculls	7:53.81	2 FA	—N/a		9:01.16	3rd place, bronze medalist(s)
María Laura Abalo; Karina Wilvers	Double Sculls	7:12.62	3 FA	—N/a		7:31.31	4th
Milka Kraljev; María Rohner	Lwt Double Sculls	7:31.50	3 R	7:37.11	1 FA	7:07.47	4th
María Laura Abalo; Karina Wilvers; Milka Kraljev; María Rohner	Quadruple Sculls	6:56.29	6th FA	—N/a		7:18.09	3rd place, bronze medalist(s)
Dolores Amaya; Oriana Ruíz	Coxless Pair	7:44.17	4 FA	—N/a		7:53.99	4th

Qualification Legend: FA=Final A (medal); FB=Final B (non-medal); R=Repechage

== Rugby sevens ==
Argentina qualified a men's and women's teams for a total of 24 athletes (12 men and 12 women).

=== Men's tournament ===
Argentina men's rugby sevens team roster:

- Fernando Luna
- Santiago Alvarez
- German Schulz
- Nicolas Bruzzonel
- Emiliano Boffelli
- Gaston Revol
- Bautista Ezcurra
- Rodrigo Etchart
- Franco Sabato
- Juan Tuculet
- Ramiro Finco
- Axel Muller Aranda

Group B

Team	Pld	W	D	L	PF	PA	PD	Pts	Qualification
Argentina	3	3	0	0	81	14	+67	9	Qualified for the quarterfinals
Canada	3	2	0	1	78	35	+43	7	Qualified for the quarterfinals
Brazil	3	1	0	2	52	50	+2	5	Qualified for the quarterfinals
Guyana	3	0	0	3	5	117	−112	3	Qualified for the quarterfinals

11 July 2015
11:55

Argentina	19–7	Brazil
	Report

Exhibition Stadium, Toronto

11 July 2015
16:49

Argentina	41–0	Guyana
	Report

Exhibition Stadium, Toronto

11 July 2015
19:55

Argentina	21–7	Canada
	Report

Exhibition Stadium, Toronto

Quarterfinals

12 July 2015
12:17

Argentina	53–0	Mexico
	Report

Exhibition Stadium, Toronto

Semifinals

12 July 2015
17:11

Uruguay	7–43	Argentina
	Report

Exhibition Stadium, Toronto

Gold medal Match

12 July 2015
19:59

(gold) Canada	22–19	Argentina (silver)
	Report

Exhibition Stadium, Toronto

2015 Pan American Games Silver medal

Argentina

=== Women's tournament ===
The Argentine women's rugby sevens team:

- Maria Botelli
- Yamila Otero
- Luciana Travesi
- Mayra Genghinil
- Josefina Padellaro
- Gladys Alcaraz
- Valeria Montero
- Rita Cazorla
- Patricia Fusco
- Sofia Gonzalez
- Magali Fazzi
- Sabrina Marcos

Preliminary Stage

Team	Pld	W	D	L	PF	PA	PD	Pts	Qualification
Canada	5	5	0	0	230	12	+218	15	Qualified for gold-medal match
United States	5	4	0	1	203	48	+155	13	Qualified for gold-medal match
Brazil	5	3	0	2	115	67	+48	11	Qualified for bronze-medal match
Argentina	5	1	1	3	57	131	−74	8	Qualified for bronze-medal match
Colombia	5	1	1	3	29	148	−119	8	
Mexico	5	0	0	5	24	252	−228	5	

11 July 2015
10:49

Mexico	5–40	Argentina
	Report

Exhibition Stadium, Toronto

11 July 2015
13:11

Brazil	22–5	Argentina
	Report

Exhibition Stadium, Toronto

11 July 2015
17:33

Argentina	7–54	United States
	Report

Exhibition Stadium, Toronto

12 July 2015
10:05

Argentina	0–45	Canada
	Report

Exhibition Stadium, Toronto

12 July 2015
12:49

Argentina	5–5	Colombia
	Report

Exhibition Stadium, Toronto

Bronze medal Match

12 July 2015
17:55

(bronze) Brazil	29–0	Argentina
	Report

Exhibition Stadium, Toronto

2015 Pan American Games 4th

Argentina

== Sailing ==
Argentina qualified 9 boats.

Men

Athlete	Event	Race																	Net Points	Final Rank
Athlete	Event	1	2	3	4	5	6	7	8	9	10	11	12	13	14	15	16	M*	Net Points	Final Rank
Mariano Reutemann	RS:X	(4)	1	3	4	4	3	3	3	3	1	3	1	2	Cancelled			2	33	3rd place, bronze medalist(s)
Julio Alsogaray	Laser	3	(17)	3	7	5	13	6	6	8	10	1	6	—N/a				2	70	6th

Women

Athlete	Event	Race																	Net Points	Final Rank
Athlete	Event	1	2	3	4	5	6	7	8	9	10	11	12	13	14	15	16	M*	Net Points	Final Rank
María Celia Tejerina Mackern	RS:X	3	4	(5)	3	5	5	4	4	3	5	2	4	4	Cancelled			8	54	4th
Lucía Falasca	Laser Radial	5	1	11	5	5	8	11	4	1	3	(15)	2	—N/a				16	72	5th
Victoria Travascio; María Sol Branz	49erFX	1	1	2	4	2	1	1	2	2	1	3	3	1	1	3	(5)	8	36	1st place, gold medalist(s)

Open

Athlete	Event	Race													Net Points	Final Rank
Athlete	Event	1	2	3	4	5	6	7	8	9	10	11	12	M*	Net Points	Final Rank
Francisco Renna	Sunfish	3	4	6	8	4	1	(9)	4	8	5	8	9	—N/a	60	7th
Diego Lipszyc; Luis Soubié	Snipe	1	1	(9)	2	3	5	2	3	2	5	3	3	8	38	2nd place, silver medalist(s)
María Salerno; Nicolás Fracchia; Javier Conte	Lightning	3	2	1	1	2	2	3	3	1	(5)	1	2	4	25	1st place, gold medalist(s)
Guillermo Bellinotto; Federico Ambrus; Matías Pereira; Juan Pereyra	J/24	1	3	(7)	1	1	2	1	1	4	1	3	3	6	27	1st place, gold medalist(s)

== Shooting ==
Argentina qualified a team of 15 athletes (10 competed in the men's events and 5 in the women's events).

Men

Event	Athlete	Qualification		Final	
Event	Athlete	Score	Rank	Score	Rank
Sebastián Lobo	10 m air pistol	555-06x	27th	Did not advance	
Daniel César Felizia	25 m rapid fire pistol	551-10x	11th	Did not advance	
Juan Savarino	25 m rapid fire pistol	Did not start			
Sebastián Lobo	50 m pistol	515-07x	23rd	Did not advance	
Valentín Cabrera	10 m air rifle	618.5	2nd	79.4	8th
Marcelo Zoccali Albizu	10 m air rifle	Did not start			
Ángel Velarte	50 m rifle prone	619.3	6th	162.9	4th
Juan Angeloni	50 m rifle prone	616.7	10th	Did not advance	
Pablo Álvarez	50 m rifle three	1135- 48x	15th	Did not advance	
Ángel Velarte	50 m rifle three	1136- 35x	14th	Did not advance	
Carlos Ballettini	Trap	96	23rd	Did not advance	
Fernando Borello	Trap	114	4th	10	2nd place, silver medalist(s)
Fernando Gazzotti	Skeet	44	23rd	Did not advance	
Federico Gil	Skeet	121	1st	12	5th

Women

Event	Athlete	Qualification		Final	
Event	Athlete	Score	Rank	Score	Rank
María Pía Herrera	10 m air pistol	368-05x	14th	Did not advance	
Laura Ramos	10 m air pistol	371-05x	7th QF	112.5	6th
María Pía Herrera	25 m pistol	562- 7 x	11th	Did not advance	
Amelia Fournel	10 m air rifle	410.0	6th	141.9	5th
Fernanda Russo	10 m air rifle	411.3	4th	204.7	2nd place, silver medalist(s)
Amelia Fournel	50 m rifle three	569- 17x	8th	446.1	2nd place, silver medalist(s)
Melisa Gil	Skeet	72	2nd	12	2nd place, silver medalist(s)

== Softball ==
Argentina qualified a men's team of 15 athletes.

Men's tournament

The Argentine softball men's team that will compete at the 2015 Pan American Games:

- Mauricio Caceres
- Santiago Carril
- Sebastian Gervasutti
- Gustavo Godoy
- Roman Godoy
- Manuel Godoy
- Juan Malarczuk
- Huemul Mata
- Teo Migliavacca
- Mariano Montero
- Pablo Montero
- Bruno Motroni
- Fernando Petric
- Juan Potolicchio
- Juan Zara

Group A

Team	Pld	W	L	RF	RA	RD	Qualification
Canada	5	5	0	33	13	+20	Qualified for the semifinals
Argentina	5	3	2	19	15	+4	Qualified for the semifinals
Venezuela	5	3	2	14	10	+4	Qualified for the semifinals
United States	5	2	3	16	10	+6	Qualified for the semifinals
Mexico	5	2	3	16	22	−6	
Dominican Republic	5	0	5	5	33	−28	

12 July 2015; 16:30	Argentina	3–0	Venezuela	President’s Choice Ajax Pan Am Ballpark, Ajax; Attendance: 200
12 July 2015; 16:30		Boxscore		President’s Choice Ajax Pan Am Ballpark, Ajax; Attendance: 200

13 July 2015; 14:00	Mexico	5–3	Argentina	President’s Choice Ajax Pan Am Ballpark, Ajax; Attendance: 220
13 July 2015; 14:00		Boxscore		President’s Choice Ajax Pan Am Ballpark, Ajax; Attendance: 220

14 July 2015; 19:00	Argentina	3–9	Canada	President’s Choice Ajax Pan Am Ballpark, Ajax; Attendance: 2,890
14 July 2015; 19:00		Boxscore		President’s Choice Ajax Pan Am Ballpark, Ajax; Attendance: 2,890

15 July 2015; 16:30	Argentina	3–1	United States	President’s Choice Ajax Pan Am Ballpark, Ajax; Attendance: 301
15 July 2015; 16:30		Boxscore		President’s Choice Ajax Pan Am Ballpark, Ajax; Attendance: 301

16 July 2015; 14:00	Dominican Republic	0–7	Argentina	President’s Choice Ajax Pan Am Ballpark, Ajax; Attendance: 340
16 July 2015; 14:00		Boxscore		President’s Choice Ajax Pan Am Ballpark, Ajax; Attendance: 340

Semifinal

17 July 2015; 19:00	Canada	2–0	Argentina	President’s Choice Ajax Pan Am Ballpark, Ajax; Attendance: 1,030
17 July 2015; 19:00		Boxscore		President’s Choice Ajax Pan Am Ballpark, Ajax; Attendance: 1,030

Bronze medal Match

18 July 2015; 12:00	(bronze) Argentina	0–2	Venezuela	President’s Choice Ajax Pan Am Ballpark, Ajax; Attendance: 2,999
18 July 2015; 12:00		Boxscore		President’s Choice Ajax Pan Am Ballpark, Ajax; Attendance: 2,999

2015 Pan American Games Bronze medal

Argentina

== Squash ==
Argentina qualified 6 athletes (3 men and 3 women).

Men

Athlete	Event	Round of 32	Round of 16	Quarterfinals	Semifinal	Final	
Athlete	Event	Opposition Score	Opposition Score	Opposition Score	Opposition Score	Opposition Score	Result
Robertino Pezzota	Singles	—N/a	A Schnell (CAN); W 11–9, 11–7, 9–11, 11–4	C Salazar (MEX); L 7–11, 16–14, 5–11, 14–12, 9–11	Did not advance		
Leandro Romiglio	Singles	—N/a	A Salazar (MEX); W 6–11, 10–12, 11–9, 11–3, 11–9	M Rodríguez (COL); L 9–11, 12–14, 11–4, 6–11	Did not advance		
Robertino Pezzota; Leandro Romiglio	Doubles	—N/a	—N/a	A Herrera (COL); J Vargas (COL); L 11–8, 6–11, 4–11	Did not advance		

Athletes	Event	Preliminaries Group stage			Quarterfinal	Semifinal	Final	
Athletes	Event	Opposition Result	Opposition Result	Opposition Result	Opposition Result	Opposition Result	Opposition Result	Result
Robertino Pezzota; Leandro Romiglio; Rodrigo Pezzota	Team	Guyana; W 3–0, 3–0, 3–0	Peru; W 0–3, 3–0, 3–0	Mexico; L 0–3, 1–3, 0–3	Guatemala; W 3–0, 3–0	Canada; L 3–1, 0–3, 0–3	Did not advance	3rd place, bronze medalist(s)

Women

Athlete	Event	Round of 32	Round of 16	Quarterfinals	Semifinal	Final	
Athlete	Event	Opposition Score	Opposition Score	Opposition Score	Opposition Score	Opposition Score	Result
Antonella Falcione	Singles	—N/a	G Delgado (CHI); L 7–11, 8–11, 9–11	Did not advance			
Fernanda Rocha	Singles	—N/a	H Naughton (CAN); L 4–11. 5–11, 6–11	Did not advance			
Antonella Falcione; Fernanda Rocha	Doubles	—N/a	—N/a	C Peláez (COL); L Tovar (COL); L 2–11, 6–11	Did not advance		

Athletes	Event	Preliminaries Group stage			Place 5–8	Place 5–6	
Athletes	Event	Opposition Result	Opposition Result	Opposition Result	Opposition Result	Opposition Result	Rank
Antonella Falcione; Fernanda Rocha; Pilar Etchechoury	Team	Brazil; W 3–2, 1–3, 3–0	Canada; L 0–3, 0–3, 0–3	Colombia; L 0–3, 2–3, 0–3	Guatemala; W 3–0, 2–0	Chile; W 0–3, 3–2, 3–1	5th

== Swimming ==
Argentina qualified 13 male swimmers and 7 female swimmers, and an additional four swimmers (two per gender) in the open water events.

Men

Athlete	Event	Heat		Final	
Athlete	Event	Time	Rank	Time	Rank
Federico Grabich	50 m freestyle	22.25	3rd FA	22.29	6th
Federico Grabich	100 m freestyle	48.60	1st FA	48.26	1st place, gold medalist(s)
Federico Grabich	200 m freestyle	1:48.61	3rd FA	1:47.62	2nd place, silver medalist(s)
Guido Buscaglia	200 m freestyle	1:52.95	16th	Did not advance	
Martín Naidich	400 m freestyle	3:54.44	12th FB	Did not advance	
Juan Martín Pereyra	400 m freestyle	3:56.86	15th FB	3:59.65	14th
Martín Naidich	1500 m freestyle	—N/a		15:46.99	13th
Federico Grabich	100 m backstroke	54.87	5th FA	54.61	5th
Felipe Vargas	200 m backstroke	2:03.82	14th FB	2:03.98	14th
Agustín Hernández	200 m backstroke	2:02.76	11th FB	2:03.37	13th
Facundo Miguelena	100 m breastroke	1:03.03	10th FB	1:03.55	12th
Rodrigo Frutos	200 m breastroke	2:19.03	15th FB	2:18.48	15th
Facundo Miguelena	200 m breastroke	2:17.67	13th FB	2:17.65	13th
Marcos Barale	100 m butterfly	53.73	12th FB	53.47	11th
Santiago Grassi	100 m butterfly	52.34	3rd FA	52.09	2nd place, silver medalist(s)
Esteban Paz	200 metre individual medley	2:07.55	14th FB	2:06.52	14th
Esteban Paz	400 metre individual medley	4:27.37	10th FB	4:26.83	11th
Matías Aguilera; Guido Buscaglia; Federico Grabich; Lautaro Rodríguez	4 × 100 metre freestyle relay	3:23.00	4th FA	3:17.41	4th
Martín Naidich; Juan Martín Pereyra; Guido Buscaglia; Federico Grabich	4 × 200 metre freestyle relay	7:39.30	6th FA	7:22.82	5th
Matías Aguilera; Santiago Grassi; Facundo Miguelena; Federico Grabich	4 × 100 metre medley relay	3:44.17	4th FA	3:39.17	4th
Guillermo Bertola	10 km open water	—N/a		1:57:38.1	8th
Gabriel Villagoiz	10 km open water	—N/a		2:01:40.6	12th

Women

Athlete	Event	Heat		Final	
Athlete	Event	Time	Rank	Time	Rank
Aixa Triay	50 m freestyle	26.03	14th FB'	26.00	13th
Aixa Triay	100 m freestyle	56.82	13th FB	56.87	12th
Andrea Berrino	100 m backstroke	1:01.32	8th FA	1:01.76	8th
Florencia Perotti	100 m backstroke	1:04.81	15th FB	1:05.18	15th
Andrea Berrino	200 m backstroke	2:13.62	7th FA	2:14.38	7th
Florencia Perotti	200 m backstroke	2:17.63	11th FB	2:17.55	12th
Macarena Ceballos	100 m breaststroke	1:10.02	9th FB	1:09.03	9th
Julia Sebastián	100 m breaststroke	1:09.97	8th FA	1:09.83	7th
Macarena Ceballos	200 m breaststroke	2:31.35	9th FB	2:30.76	9th
Julia Sebastián	200 m breaststroke	2:29.00	7th FA	2:29.45	6th
María Belén Díaz	100 m butterfly	1:01.53	12th FB	1:01.50	12th
Virginia Bardach	200 m butterfly	2:12.31	4th FA	2:13.25	5th
Virginia Bardach	200 metre individual medley	2:16.86	7th FA	2:15.45	6th
Florencia Perotti	200 metre individual medley	2:18.95	9th FB	2:17.65	9th
Virginia Bardach	400 metre individual medley	4:48.96	6th FA	4:44.85	5th
Florencia Perotti	400 metre individual medley	4:52.60	9th FB	4:50.52	9th
Andrea Berrino; María Belén Díaz; Julia Sebastián; Aixa Triay	4 × 100 metre medley relay	4:15.66	5th FA	4:08.24	4th
Julia Arino	10 km open water	—N/a		2:07:54.1	12th
Cecilia Biagioli	10 km open water	—N/a		2:04:37.8	9th

== Synchronized swimming ==
Argentina qualified a full team of nine athletes.

Athlete	Event	Technical Routine		Free Routine		Total	
Athlete	Event	Points	Rank	Points	Rank	Points	Rank
Etel Sánchez; Sofía Sánchez	Women's duet	79.0024	6th	80.1333	6th	159.1357	6th
Etel Sánchez; Sofía Sánchez; Camila Arregui; Lucía Paula Diaz; Sofía Eliceche; Ana Victoria Fernández; Sofía Ana Boasso; Brenda Moller; Lucina Soledad Simón	Women's team	76.4198	5th	78.9000	5th	155.3198	5th

== Table tennis ==
Argentina qualified a men's and women's team.

Men

Athlete	Event	Group stage				Round of 32	Round of 16	Quarterfinals	Semifinals	Final / BM	
Athlete	Event	Opposition Result	Opposition Result	Opposition Result	Rank	Opposition Result	Opposition Result	Opposition Result	Opposition Result	Opposition Result	Rank
Gastón Alto	Singles	H Moscoso (GUA); W 4–0	T Wang (USA); L 3–4	R Tapia (ECU); W 4–1	2nd	K Jha (USA); W 4–2	H Calderano (BRA); L 1–4	Did not advance			
Rodrigo Gilabert	Singles	J Chavez (PER); W 4–2	T Monteiro (BRA); L 2–4	M Moya (CHI); W 4–0	2nd	JM Ramirez (GUA); L 2–4	Did not advance				
Pablo Tabachnik	Singles	A Gavilan (PAR); W 4–1	B Afanador (PUR); W 4–1	L Diaz (VEN); W 4–1	1st	—N/a	M Aguirre (PAR); W 4–2	E Wang (CAN); L 0–4	Did not advance		
Gastón Alto; Rodrigo Gilabert; Pablo Tabachnik	Team	Dominican Republic; W 3–2, 3–0, 3–2	Mexico; W 1–3, 3–1, 3–0, 1–3, 3–1	—N/a	1st	—N/a		Canada; L 0–3, 2–3, 2–3	Did not advance		

Women

Athlete	Event	Group stage				Round of 32	Round of 16	Quarterfinals	Semifinals	Final / BM	
Athlete	Event	Opposition Result	Opposition Result	Opposition Result	Rank	Opposition Result	Opposition Result	Opposition Result	Opposition Result	Opposition Result	Rank
Camila Argüelles	Singles	A Cote (CAN); W 4–3	L Gui (BRA); L 1–4	A Mori (PER); W 4–3	2nd	M Diaz (PUR); L 2–4	Did not advance				
Ana Codina	Singles	J Nieto (PER); W 4–0	P Medina (COL); L 2–4	J Valdez (DOM); L 3–4	3rd	Did not advance					
Agustina Iwasa	Singles	A Diaz (PUR); L 0–4	A Umbacia (COL); L 2–4	L Castillo (CUB); L 0–4	4th	Did not advance					
Ana Codina; Camila Arguelles; Naomi Iwasa	Team	United States; L 0–3, 0–3, 0–3	Dominican Republic; W 3–2, 3–1, 3–1	—N/a	2nd	—N/a		Puerto Rico; L 0–3, 2–3, 0–3	Did not advance		

== Taekwondo ==
Argentina qualified a team of five athletes (three men and two women).

Men

Athlete	Event	Round of 16	Quarterfinals	Semifinals	Repechage	Bronze medal	Final	
Athlete	Event	Opposition Result	Opposition Result	Opposition Result	Opposition Result	Opposition Result	Opposition Result	Rank
Lucas Guzmán	Men's −58kg	L Pie (DOM); L 6–8	Did not advance		M Leal (VEN); W 10–2	V Torres (BRA); W 2–0	—N/a	3rd place, bronze medalist(s)
Agustín Alves	Men's −80kg	M Rodriguez (NCA); W 11–2	R Lizárraga (MEX); L 6–12	Did not advance				
Martín Sio	Men's +80kg	L Zamora (CHI); W 8–5	G Cezario (BRA); W 4–2	C Rivas (VEN); L 9–10	—N/a	P Yun (USA); L 9–2	—N/a	5th

Women

Athlete	Event	Round of 16	Quarterfinals	Semifinals	Repechage	Bronze medal	Final	
Athlete	Event	Opposition Result	Opposition Result	Opposition Result	Opposition Result	Opposition Result	Opposition Result	Rank
Celina Proffen	Women's −57kg	C Carstens (PAN); W 3–2	P Armeria (MEX); L 1–2	—N/a	V Vasquez (ESA); W 5–1	D Patiño (COL); L 1–2	—N/a	5th
Alexis Arnoldt	Women's −67kg	V Heredia (MEX); L 9–10	Did not advance		A Kraayeveld (CAN); W 21–0	J Vasconcelos (BRA); W 5–1	—N/a	3rd place, bronze medalist(s)

== Tennis ==
Argentina qualified 4 tennis players (2 men and 2 women).

Singles

Athlete	Event	Round of 32	Round of 16	Quarterfinals	Semifinals	Final / Bronze medal	Rank
Athlete	Event	Opposition Score	Opposition Score	Opposition Score	Opposition Score	Opposition Score	Rank
Guido Andreozzi	Men's	R Banzer (BOL); W 6–1, 6–2	R Rodríguez (VEN); W 3–6, 1–6	D Galeano (PAR); W 2–6, 6–1, 7–6	N Barrientos (COL); L 6–7, 5–7	D Novikov (USA); L 4–6, 4–6	4th
Facundo Bagnis	Men's	C Díaz Figueroa (GUA); W 6–2, 4–6, 6–3	P Bester (CAN); W 4–6, 6–3, 6–4	G Escobar (ECU); W 6–4, 5–7, 6–1	D Novikov (USA); W 6–3, 6–7, 6–2	N Barrientos (COL); W 6–1, 6–2	1st place, gold medalist(s)
María Irigoyen	Women's	C Zhao (CAN); L 6–1, 5–7, 4–6	Did not advance				
Paula Ormaechea	Women's	V Cepede (PAR); L 6–7, 4–6	Did not advance				

Doubles

Athlete	Event	Quarterfinals	Semifinals	Final / Bronze medal	Rank
Athlete	Event	Opposition Score	Opposition Score	Opposition Score	Rank
Guido Andreozzi; Facundo Bagnis	Men's	R Arus (URU); A Behar (URU); W 6–2, 6–1	D King (BAR); H Lewis (BAR); W 6–3, 4–6, 10–8	N Jerry (CHI); H Podlipnik Castillo (CHI); L 4–6, 6–7	2nd place, silver medalist(s)
María Irigoyen; Paula Ormaechea	Women's	L Chirico (USA); L Davis (USA); W 7–5, 6–4	G Dabrowski (CAN); C Zhao (CAN); L 2–6, 1–6	P Araujo Goncavles (BRA); B Haddad Maia (BRA); W Retired	3rd place, bronze medalist(s)
Guido Andreozzi; María Irigoyen	Mixed	M Alvarez (BOL); H Dellien (BOL); W 6–0, 6–4	V Cepede (PAR); D Galeano (PAR); W 1–6, 6–3, 10–7	P Bester (CAN); G Dabrowski (CAN); W 6–3, 6–0	1st place, gold medalist(s)

== Triathlon ==
Argentina qualified 6 athletes (3 men and 3 women).

Athlete	Event	Swim (1.5 km)	Trans 1	Bike (40 km)	Trans 2	Run (10 km)	Total	Rank
Martín Bedirián	Men's individual	18:57; 11th	0:23; 16th	58:23; 22nd	0:21; 10th	35:18; 24th	1:53:23	23rd
Luciano Taccone	Men's individual	20:03; 29th	0:23; 15th	57:13; 2nd	0:21; 21st	31:22; 6th	1:49:25	6th
Gonzalo Tellechea	Men's individual	20:06; 30th	0:22; 8th	58:21; 1st	0:22; 25th	30:57; 4th	1:49:12	4th
Romina Biagioli	Women's individual	20:11; 11th	0:34; 7th	1:00:56; 9th	0:22; 5th	38:33; 14th	2:00:38	11th
Romina Palacio Balena	Women's individual	20:13; 13th	0:30; 1st	1:01:01; 12th	0:28; 24th	38:32; 13th	2:00:46	12th
María Victoria Rivero	Women's individual	22:50; 29th	0:41; 20th	1:20:27; 30th	Overlapped			

== Volleyball ==
Argentina qualified a men's and women's volleyball team, for a total of 24 athletes (12 men and 12 women).

=== Men's tournament ===
The Argentina indoor volleyball men's team consists of the following players:

- Sebastian Closter
- Facundo Conte
- Pablo Crer
- Luciano de Cecco
- Javier Filardi
- Maximiliano Gauna
- Jose Gonzalez
- Rodrigo Quiroga
- Martin Ramos
- Sebastian Sole
- Nicolas Uriarte
- Luciano Zornetta

Group A

Pos	Team	Pld	W	L	Pts	SPW	SPL	SPR	SW	SL	SR
1	Brazil	3	2	1	12	258	220	1.173	8	3	2.667
2	Argentina	3	2	1	9	243	205	1.185	6	4	1.500
3	Cuba	3	2	1	9	255	255	1.000	7	5	1.400
4	Colombia	3	0	3	0	149	225	0.662	0	9	0.000

Source: Archived 2016-03-04 at the Wayback Machine

Date		Score		Set 1	Set 2	Set 3	Set 4	Set 5	Total	Report
Jul 17	Argentina	3–1	Cuba	25 – 20	25 – 15	23 – 25	25 – 15		98–75	Report
Jul 19	Argentina	3–0	Colombia	25 – 14	25 – 16	25 – 21			75–51	Report
Jul 21	Argentina	0–3	Brazil	27 – 29	21 – 25	22 – 25			70–79	Report

Quarterfinal

Date		Score		Set 1	Set 2	Set 3	Set 4	Set 5	Total	Report
Jul 22	Argentina	3–0	United States	25 – 16	25 – 21	25 – 15			75–52	Report

Semifinal

Date		Score		Set 1	Set 2	Set 3	Set 4	Set 5	Total	Report
Jul 24	Argentina	3–1	Canada	28 – 26	20 – 25	25 – 21	25 – 23		98–95	Report

Gold medal match

Date		Score		Set 1	Set 2	Set 3	Set 4	Set 5	Total	Report
Jul 26	(gold) Argentina	3–2	Brazil (silver)	25 – 23	18 – 25	19 – 25	25 – 23	15 – 8	102–104	Report

2015 Pan American Games Gold medal

Argentina

=== Women's tournament ===
- Natalia Aispurúa
- Leticia Boscacci
- Yael Castiglione
- Antonela Curatola
- Josefina Fernández
- Lucia Fresco
- Julieta Lazcano
- Yamila Nizetich
- Sol Piccolo
- Tatiana Rizzo
- Elina Rodríguez
- Emilce Sosa

Sources: FeVA, Toronto 2015

Group A

Pos	Team	Pld	W	L	Pts	SPW	SPL	SPR	SW	SL	SR
1	Dominican Republic	3	2	1	10	261	215	1.214	7	4	1.750
2	Argentina	3	2	1	10	252	254	0.992	7	4	1.750
3	Cuba	3	1	2	5	248	259	0.958	4	7	0.571
4	Canada	3	1	2	5	228	261	0.874	4	7	0.571

Source: Archived 2015-10-20 at the Wayback Machine

Date		Score		Set 1	Set 2	Set 3	Set 4	Set 5	Total	Report
Jul 16	Argentina	3–0	Cuba	25 – 23	26 – 24	25 – 19			76–66	Report
Jul 18	Argentina	1–3	Dominican Republic	25 – 22	11 – 25	22 – 25	18 – 25		76–97	Report
Jul 20	Argentina	3–1	Canada	23 – 25	27 – 25	25 – 20	25 – 21		100–91	Report

Quarterfinal

Date		Score		Set 1	Set 2	Set 3	Set 4	Set 5	Total	Report
Jul 22	Argentina	2–3	Puerto Rico	21 – 25	27 – 25	10 – 25	25 – 11	13 – 15	96–101	Report

Fifth place match

Date		Score		Set 1	Set 2	Set 3	Set 4	Set 5	Total	Report
Jul 23	Argentina	1–3	Cuba	21 – 25	25 – 21	17 – 25	21 – 25		84–96	Report

2015 Pan American Games 6th

Argentina

== Water polo ==
Argentina qualified a men's and a women's team. Each team consisted of 13 athletes, for a total of 26.

=== Men's tournament ===
The following is the Argentinian men's water polo squad.

- Tomas Bulgheroni
- Carlos Camnsaio
- Ivan Carabantes
- Esteban Corsi
- Julian Daszczyk
- Franco Demarchi
- Emanuel Lopez
- Diego Malnero
- Hernan Mazzini
- Andres Monutii
- Juan Montane Tobares
- Ramiro Veich
- German Yanez

Group A

Team	Pld	W	D	L	GF	GA	GD	Pts	Qualification
United States	3	3	0	0	62	7	+55	6	Qualified for the semifinals
Argentina	3	1	1	1	31	29	+2	3	Qualified for the semifinals
Cuba	3	1	1	1	21	31	−10	3	
Ecuador	3	0	0	3	11	58	−47	0	

8 July 2015; 16:08	Report	Ecuador	8–21	Argentina	Markham Pan Am Centre; Referees: Daniel Vazquez (MEX), Thomas Molnar (HUN)
8 July 2015; 16:08	Report	Score by quarters: 4–5, 1–6, 0–2, 3–8			Markham Pan Am Centre; Referees: Daniel Vazquez (MEX), Thomas Molnar (HUN)
8 July 2015; 16:08	Report	Kaltenbach, Kaltenbach 3	Goals	Veich 5, Yanez 4, Damarchi 3, Carabantes 3, Corsi 2, Lopez 2, Monutti 2	Markham Pan Am Centre; Referees: Daniel Vazquez (MEX), Thomas Molnar (HUN)

9 July 2015; 20:08	Report	Cuba	7–7	Argentina	Markham Pan Am Centre; Referees: William Mackay (CAN), Hugo Paredes (VEN).
9 July 2015; 20:08	Report	Score by quarters: 0-3, 1-1, 4-2, 2-1			Markham Pan Am Centre; Referees: William Mackay (CAN), Hugo Paredes (VEN).
9 July 2015; 20:08	Report	2 players 1	Goals	Demarchi 3, Carabantes 2, Corsi 1, Yanez 1	Markham Pan Am Centre; Referees: William Mackay (CAN), Hugo Paredes (VEN).

11 July 2015; 16:08	Report	United States	14–3	Argentina	Markham Pan Am Centre; Referees: Arnoldo Zambrano (VEN), Stéphane Roy (CAN)
11 July 2015; 16:08	Report	Score by quarters: 3-1, 3-0, 4-1, 4-1			Markham Pan Am Centre; Referees: Arnoldo Zambrano (VEN), Stéphane Roy (CAN)
11 July 2015; 16:08	Report	Azevedo 4	Goals	Veich 2, Carabantes 1	Markham Pan Am Centre; Referees: Arnoldo Zambrano (VEN), Stéphane Roy (CAN)

Semifinal

13 July 2015; 20:00	Report	Argentina	9–15	Brazil	Markham Pan Am Centre; Referees: Arnoldo Zambrano (VEN), Daniel Vasquez (MEX)
13 July 2015; 20:00	Report	Score by quarters: 1-3, 1-4, 4-2, 4-5			Markham Pan Am Centre; Referees: Arnoldo Zambrano (VEN), Daniel Vasquez (MEX)
13 July 2015; 20:00	Report	Carabantes 3, Yanez 2, Veich 1, Bulgheroni 1, Damarchi 1, Lopez 1	Goals	Perrone 3	Markham Pan Am Centre; Referees: Arnoldo Zambrano (VEN), Daniel Vasquez (MEX)

Bronze medal Match

15 July 2015; 18:00	Report	(bronze) Canada	16–8	Argentina	Markham Pan Am Centre; Referees: Edmundo Rodrigues (ECU), Humberto Navarro (USA)
15 July 2015; 18:00	Report	Score by quarters: 3-2, 5-3, 4-2, 4-1			Markham Pan Am Centre; Referees: Edmundo Rodrigues (ECU), Humberto Navarro (USA)
15 July 2015; 18:00	Report	Conway 4, Taschereau 3, Mcelroy 2, Graham 2, Boyd 2, Vikalo 1, Kudaba 1.	Goals	Yanez 3, Veich 3, Bulgheroni 1, Corsi 1	Markham Pan Am Centre; Referees: Edmundo Rodrigues (ECU), Humberto Navarro (USA)

2015 Pan American Games 4th

Argentina

=== Women's tournament ===
Argentina's team roster:

- Camila Bertaina
- Tatiana Canton
- Carla Comba
- Mariela de Virgilio
- Rocio de Virgilio
- Rocio Fesembeck
- Laura Font
- Dana Lea Gerschcovsky
- Federica Gomez de la Canal
- Ashley Hatcher
- Florencia Magraht
- Maria Olivieri
- Manuela Tamagnone Werbach

Group A

Team	Pld	W	D	L	GF	GA	GD	Pts	Qualification
United States	3	3	0	0	73	9	+64	6	Qualified for the semifinals
Cuba	3	2	0	1	24	30	−6	4	Qualified for the semifinals
Argentina	3	1	0	2	16	48	−32	2	
Mexico	3	0	0	3	20	46	−26	0	

8 July 2015; 08:08	Report	Mexico	8–10	Argentina	Markham Pan Am Centre; Referees: João Cardenuto (BRA), Reynel Castillo (PUR)
8 July 2015; 08:08	Report	Score by quarters: 1–2, 1–2, 3–2, 3–4			Markham Pan Am Centre; Referees: João Cardenuto (BRA), Reynel Castillo (PUR)
8 July 2015; 08:08	Report	Castro, Morales 2	Goals	M De Virgilio 4, Bertaina 2, Font 2, Hatcher 1, R De Virgilio 1	Markham Pan Am Centre; Referees: João Cardenuto (BRA), Reynel Castillo (PUR)

9 July 2015; 10:08	Report	Cuba	10–3	Argentina	Markham Pan Am Centre; Referees: Arnoldo Zambrano (VEN), Stephane Roy (CAN)
9 July 2015; 10:08	Report	Score by quarters: 1–0, 3–0, 3–1, 3–2			Markham Pan Am Centre; Referees: Arnoldo Zambrano (VEN), Stephane Roy (CAN)
9 July 2015; 10:08	Report	Bravo, Bernal 3	Goals	Hatcher 1, M De Virgilio 1, R De Virgilio 1	Markham Pan Am Centre; Referees: Arnoldo Zambrano (VEN), Stephane Roy (CAN)

11 July 2015; 08:08	Report	United States	30–3	Argentina	Markham Pan Am Centre; Referees: Hugo Parades (VEN), Edmundo Rodrigues (BRA)
11 July 2015; 08:08	Report	Score by quarters: 8-0, 6-1, 6-1, 10-1			Markham Pan Am Centre; Referees: Hugo Parades (VEN), Edmundo Rodrigues (BRA)
11 July 2015; 08:08	Report	Clark 7	Goals	Font 2, Hatcher 1	Markham Pan Am Centre; Referees: Hugo Parades (VEN), Edmundo Rodrigues (BRA)

Classification 5–8

12 July 2015; 12:00	Report	Argentina	6–14	Puerto Rico	Markham Pan Am Centre; Referees: Joao Cardenuto (BRA), Humberto Navarro (USA)
12 July 2015; 12:00	Report	Score by quarters: 1-3, 2-4, 0-3, 3-4			Markham Pan Am Centre; Referees: Joao Cardenuto (BRA), Humberto Navarro (USA)
12 July 2015; 12:00	Report	Font 3, Comba 2, Hatcher 1	Goals	Medina 5	Markham Pan Am Centre; Referees: Joao Cardenuto (BRA), Humberto Navarro (USA)

Seventh place match

14 July 2015; 12:00	Report	Argentina	8–9	Venezuela	Markham Pan Am Centre; Referees: João Cardenuto (BRA), Constantino Castro (CUB)
14 July 2015; 12:00	Report	Score by quarters: 0-1, 1-2, 2-1, 2-1			Markham Pan Am Centre; Referees: João Cardenuto (BRA), Constantino Castro (CUB)
14 July 2015; 12:00	Report	R De Virgilio 2	Goals	Coronel 2	Markham Pan Am Centre; Referees: João Cardenuto (BRA), Constantino Castro (CUB)

2015 Pan American Games 8th

Argentina

== Water skiing ==
Argentina qualified 5 athletes (4 men and 1 woman).

Men

Athlete	Event	Preliminaries		Final	
Athlete	Event	Total	Rank	Total	Rank
Javier Julio	Tricks	8740	6th	9450	3rd place, bronze medalist(s)
Javier Julio	Slalom	11.25	2nd	11.25	3rd place, bronze medalist(s)
Javier Julio	Jump	56.4	5th	DNS	8th
Martín Malarczuk	Tricks	2490	12th	Did not advance	
Martín Malarczuk	Slalom	12.00	12th	Did not advance	
Jorge Renosto	Tricks	9360	4th	0	8th
Alejo De Palma	Wakeboard	52.34	3rd	52.01	7th

Women

Athlete	Event	Preliminaries		Final	
Athlete	Event	Total	Rank	Total	Rank
Lorena Botana	Tricks	1870	10th	Did not advance	
Lorena Botana	Slalom	18.25	10th	Did not advance	
Lorena Botana	Jump	0.0	9th	Did not advance	

Overall

Athlete	Event	Final				
Athlete	Event	Tricks	Slalom	Jump	Total	Rank
Javier Julio	Men's overall	682.4	1000.0	873.3	2555.7	3rd place, bronze medalist(s)

== Weightlifting ==
Argentina qualified a team of 2 athletes (1 man and 1 woman).

Athlete	Event	Snatch			Clean & Jerk			Total	Rank
Athlete	Event	Attempt 1	Attempt 2	Attempt 3	Attempt 1	Attempt 2	Attempt 3	Total	Rank
Iván Palacios	Men's 94 kg	145	~~148~~	~~148~~	170	180	~~185~~	325	8th
María Martínez	Women's 69 kg	88	92	~~94~~	108	111	~~114~~	203	7th

== Wrestling ==
Argentina qualified five male wrestlers and one female wrestler. Luz Vázquez was disqualified from the games for doping.

Men
Freestyle

Athlete	Event	Quarterfinals	Semifinals	Bronze medal	Final
Athlete	Event	Opposition Result	Opposition Result	Opposition Result	Opposition Result
Ricardo Báez	Men's 86 kg	J Herbert (USA); L 0–11	—N/a	J Espinal (PUR); L 0–12	—N/a
Yuri Maier	Men's 97 kg	K Snyder (USA); L 1–11	—N/a	J Diaz (VEN); L 0–9	—N/a
Iván Burtovoy	Men's 125 kg	H De Oliveira (BRA); L 0–11	Did not advance		

Greco-Roman

Athlete	Event	Quarterfinals	Semifinals	Bronze medal	Final
Athlete	Event	Opposition Result	Opposition Result	Opposition Result	Opposition Result
Maximiliano Prudenzano	Men's 75 kg	A Almendra (PAN); L 0–9	—N/a	C Munoz (COL); L 3–4	—N/a
Luciano Del Río	Men's 130 kg	J Encarnacion (DOM); L 5–6	Did not advance		

Women

Freestyle

Athlete	Event	Quarterfinals	Semifinals	Bronze medal
Athlete	Event	Opposition Result	Opposition Result	Opposition Result
~~Luz Vázquez~~	Women's 69 kg	G De Oliveira (BRA); W 7–0	D Yeats (CAN); L 3–14	Y Sanchez (CUB); W 7–1 (bronze)

== See also ==
- Argentina at the 2015 Parapan American Games
- Argentina at the 2016 Summer Olympics
