= Adrián Portela =

Argentine handball player (born 1986)

Personal information
- Born: 8 March 1986 (age 40) Buenos Aires, Argentina
- Height: 1.85 m (6 ft 1 in)

Sport
- Sport: Handball
- Position: Left wing
- Current club: River Plate
National team
Years	Team	Apps	(Gls)
–	Argentina	42	(116)
Medal record
Pan American Games
Silver medal – second place	2015 Toronto	Team
Pan American Championship
Bronze medal – third place	2016 Argentina

Adrián Portela (born 8 March 1986) is an Argentine handball player for Club Atlético River Plate and the Argentina men's national handball team.

He defended Argentina at the 2015 World Men's Handball Championship in Qatar.

== Individual awards and achievements ==
- 2016 Pan American Men's Club Handball Championship: Best left wing
