= Planet Bowl =

Tenpin bowling alley in Toronto, Ontario

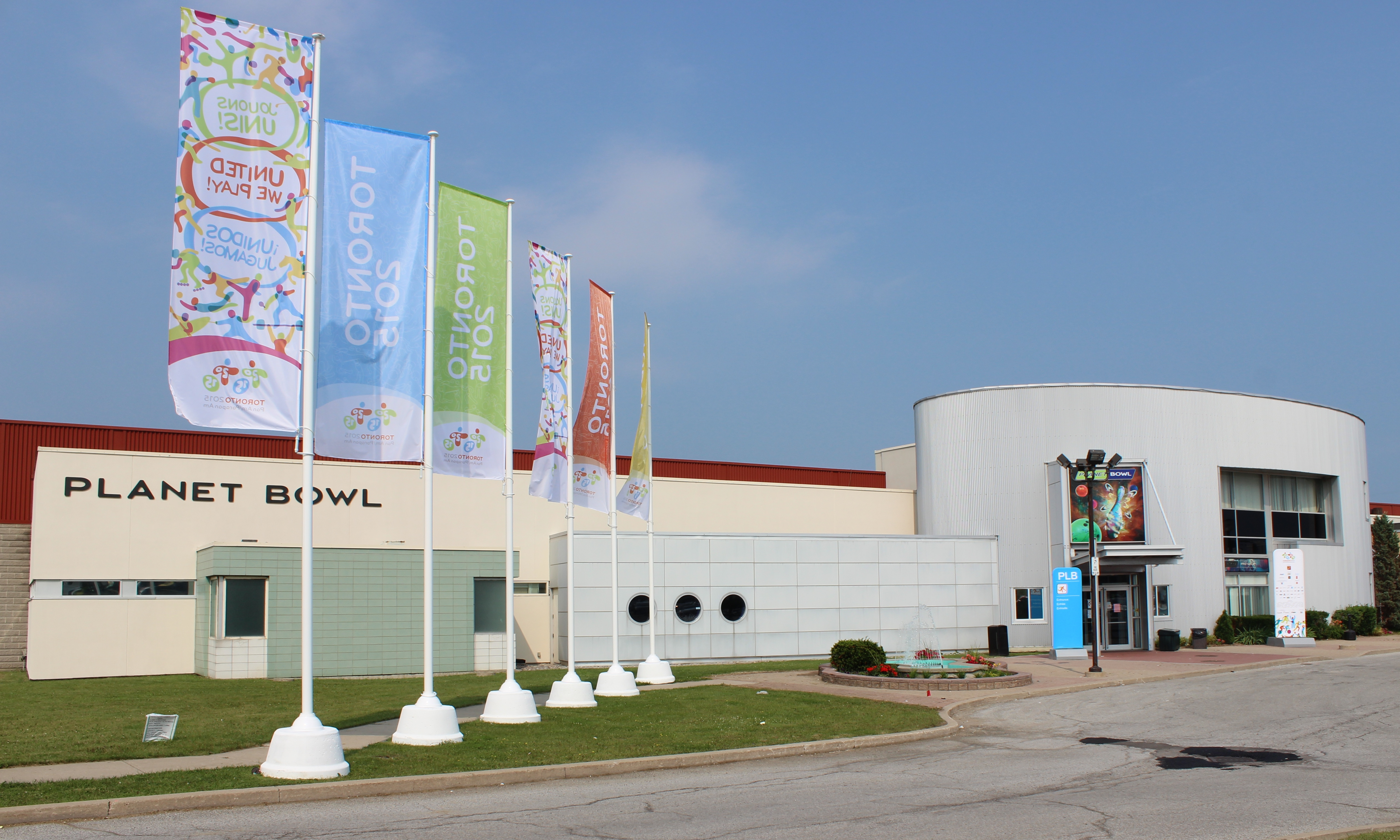
- Interactive map of Planet Bowl
- Address: 5555 Eglinton Avenue West
- Location: Toronto, Ontario, Canada
- Coordinates: 43.6503453°N 79.6032329°W
- Capacity: 150

Tenant
- 2015 Pan American Games

Planet Bowl is a large 48-lane AMF tenpin bowling alley in Toronto, Ontario, Canada. It was the venue for tenpin bowling for the 2015 Pan American Games after a change in site from Classic Bowl in Mississauga.

The centre, located in the Etobicoke district, is one of the largest in Toronto area with 48 lanes.

During the 2015 Games the venue was known as the Pan Am Bowling Centre.

== See also ==
- Venues of the 2015 Pan American and Parapan American Games
