= Roller sports at the 2015 Pan American Games – Women's 10,000 metres points race =

Women's 10,000 metres points race in roller sports at the 2015 Pan American Games
- Venue: St. John Paul II Catholic Secondary School
- Dates: July 13
- Competitors: 11 from 11 nations

Medalists
Gold medal	Maira Arias	Argentina
Silver medal	Emma Clare Townshend	Ecuador
Bronze medal	Darian O'Neil	United States

The women's speed skating 10,000 metres points race competition of the roller skating events at the 2015 Pan American Games was held on July 13 at the St. John Paul II Catholic Secondary School in Toronto.

== Schedule ==
All times are Central Standard Time (UTC-6).

Date	Time	Round
July 13, 2015	16:35	Final

== Results ==
11 athletes from 11 countries competed.

Rank	Name	Nation	Points
1st place, gold medalist(s)	Maira Arias	Argentina	41
2nd place, silver medalist(s)	Emma Clare Townshend	Ecuador	11
3rd place, bronze medalist(s)	Darian O'Neil	United States	6
4	Valeria Riffo	Chile	6
5	Sindy Cortes Chavez	Venezuela	5
6	Daniela Luna	Mexico	2
7	Valérie Maltais	Canada	1
	Dalia Soberanis Marenco	Guatemala	DNF
	Johana Viveros	Colombia	DNF
	Judith Lopez	El Salvador	DNF
	Jennifer Monterrey	Costa Rica	DNS
