= Roller sports at the 2015 Pan American Games – Men's 10,000 metres points race =

Men's 10,000 metres points race in roller sports at the 2015 Pan American Games
- Venue: St. John Paul II Catholic Secondary School
- Dates: July 13
- Competitors: 13 from 13 nations

Medalists
Gold medal	Mike Paez	Mexico
Silver medal	Juan Sebastián Sanz	Colombia
Bronze medal	Jordan Belchos	Canada

The men's speed skating 10,000 metres points race in roller sports at the 2015 Pan American Games was held on July 13 at the St. John Paul II Catholic Secondary School in Toronto.

== Schedule ==
All times are Central Standard Time (UTC-6).

Date	Time	Round
July 13, 2015	17:14	Final

== Results ==
13 athletes from 13 countries competed.

Rank	Name	Nation	Points
1st place, gold medalist(s)	Mike Paez	Mexico	23
2nd place, silver medalist(s)	Juan Sebastián Sanz	Colombia	13
3rd place, bronze medalist(s)	Jordan Belchos	Canada	9
4	Jorge Bolaños	Ecuador	8
5	Ken Kuwada	Argentina	6
6	Carlos Montoya Arce	Costa Rica	4
7	Mauricio García	Dominican Republic	4
8	Rolando Ossandon	Chile	3
9	Julio Mirena	Venezuela	2
10	Mario Valencia	United States	0
	Eduardo Mollinedo Oliva	Guatemala	DNF
	Odir Miranda	El Salvador	DNF
	Javier Sepulveda Toro	Puerto Rico	DNS
