= Roller sports at the 2015 Pan American Games – Women's 500 metres =

Women's 500 metres in roller sports at the 2015 Pan American Games
- Venue: St. John Paul II Catholic Secondary School
- Dates: July 13
- Competitors: 10 from 10 nations

Medalists
Gold medal	Hellen Montoya	Colombia
Silver medal	Erin Jackson	United States
Bronze medal	Ingrid Factos	Ecuador

The women's speed skating 500 metres competition in roller sports at the 2015 Pan American Games was held on July 13 at the St. John Paul II Catholic Secondary School in Toronto.

== Schedule ==
All times are Central Standard Time (UTC-6).

Date	Time	Round
July 13, 2015	9:50	Semifinals
July 13, 2015	10:38	Final

== Results ==
10 athletes from 10 countries competed.

Semifinal - Heat 1

Rank	Name	Nation	Time	Notes
1	Hellen Montoya	Colombia	43.506	Q
2	Erin Jackson	United States	43.597	Q
3	Rocio Berbel Alt	Argentina	43.666	
4	Dalia Soberanis Marenco	Guatemala	44.079	
5	Jennifer Monterrey	Costa Rica	44.664	

Semifinal - Heat 2

Rank	Name	Nation	Time	Notes
1	Ingrid Factos	Ecuador	42.695	Q
2	Veronica Elias	Mexico	42.740	Q
3	María José Moya	Chile	42.748	
4	Yarubi Bandres Garcia	Venezuela	42.877	
5	Valérie Maltais	Canada	43.420	

Final

Rank	Name	Nation	Time	Notes
1st place, gold medalist(s)	Hellen Montoya	Colombia	43.370	
2nd place, silver medalist(s)	Erin Jackson	United States	43.714	
3rd place, bronze medalist(s)	Ingrid Factos	Ecuador	43.875	
4	Veronica Elias	Mexico	43.940	
