= Roller sports at the 2015 Pan American Games – Men's 200 metres time-trial =

Men's 200 metres time trial in roller sports at the 2015 Pan American Games
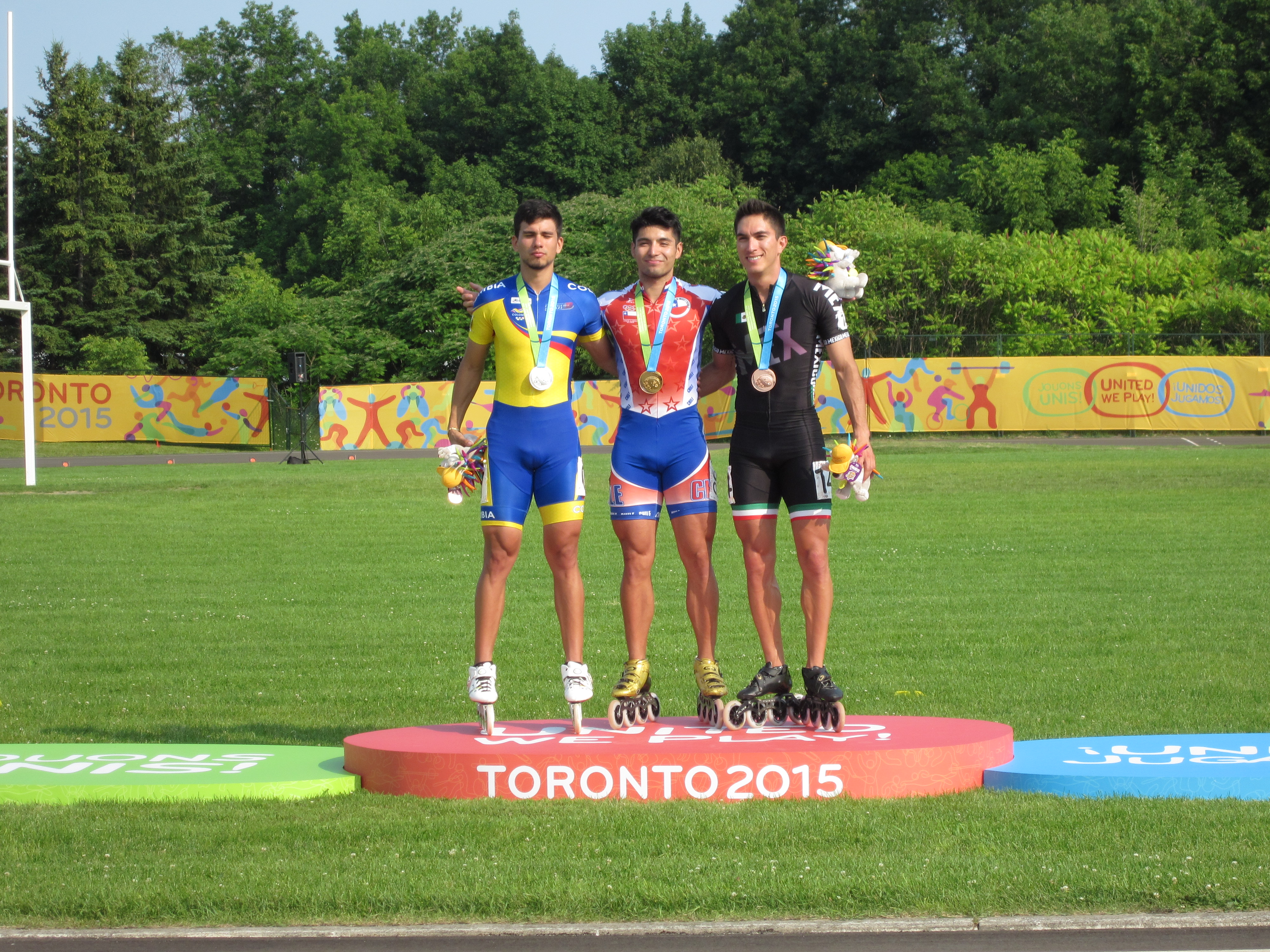
- 2015 Pan American Games Speed Skating Men's 200 metres time-trial medalists
- Venue: St. John Paul II Catholic Secondary School
- Dates: July 12
- Competitors: 12 from 12 nations

Medalists
Gold medal	Emanuelle Silva	Chile
Silver medal	Pedro Causil	Colombia
Bronze medal	Jorge Martínez	Mexico

The men's speed skating 200 metres time trial in roller sports at the 2015 Pan American Games was held on July 12 at the St. John Paul II Catholic Secondary School in Toronto.

== Schedule ==
All times are Central Standard Time (UTC-6).

Date	Time	Round
July 12, 2015	16:49	Final

== Results ==
12 athletes from 12 countries competed.

Rank	Name	Nation	Time
1st place, gold medalist(s)	Emanuelle Silva	Chile	16.138
2nd place, silver medalist(s)	Pedro Causil	Colombia	16.149
3rd place, bronze medalist(s)	Jorge Martínez	Mexico	16.355
4	Jhoan Guzmán	Venezuela	16.385
5	Ezequiel Cappelleno	Argentina	16.989
6	Javier Sepulveda	Puerto Rico	17.184
7	Jarrett Paul	United States	17.257
8	Christopher Fiola	Canada	17.588
9	Carlos Montoya	Costa Rica	17.621
10	Odir Miranda	El Salvador	17.738
11	Eduardo Mollinedo	Guatemala	17.908
	Mauricio García	Dominican Republic	DNS
