= Colombia at the 2015 Pan American Games =

- IOC code: COL
- NOC: Colombian Olympic Committee
- Website: www.olimpicocol.co (in Spanish)

in Toronto, Canada 10–26 July 2015
- Competitors: 291 in 19 sports
- Flag bearer (opening): Miguel Ángel Rodríguez
- Flag bearer (closing): Caterine Ibargüen
- Medals Ranked 5th: Gold 27 Silver 14 Bronze 31 Total 72

Pan American Games appearances (overview)
- 1951; 1955; 1959; 1963; 1967; 1971; 1975; 1979; 1983; 1987; 1991; 1995; 1999; 2003; 2007; 2011; 2015; 2019; 2023

Colombia competed at the 2015 Pan American Games in Toronto, Canada from 10 July to 26 July 2015.

On 23 June 2015 squash player Miguel Ángel Rodríguez was named the flagbearer of the team during the opening ceremony.

== Competitors ==
The following table lists Colombia's delegation per sport and gender.

Sport	Men	Women	Total
Archery	3	3	6
Athletics	13	10	23
Baseball	24		24
Beach volleyball		2	2
Bowling	2	2	4
Boxing	6	2	8
Canoeing	4	4	8
Cycling	15	13	28
Diving	4	2	6
Equestrian	11	2	13
Fencing	9	4	13
Football		16	16
Golf	2	2	4
Gymnastics	6	6	12
Judo	2	6	8
Racquetball	3	2	5
Roller sports	3	3	6
Rowing	18	8	26
Rugby sevens		12	12
Sailing	6	1	7
Shooting	5	1	6
Squash	3	3	6
Swimming	7	4	11
Synchronised swimming		2	2
Table tennis		3	3
Taekwondo	4	4	8
Tennis	3	2	5
Triathlon	1		1
Volleyball	12		12
Water skiing	4	1	5
Weightlifting	7	6	13
Wrestling	8	6	14
Total	167	124	291

== Medalists ==
Medal	Name	Sport	Event	Date
Gold	Habib de las Salas	Weightlifting	Men's 56 kg	11 July
Gold	Óscar Figueroa	Weightlifting	Men's 62 kg	11 July
Gold	Hellen Montoya	Roller sports	Women's 200 metres time trial	12 July
Gold	Rusmeris Villar	Weightlifting	Women's 53 kg	12 July
Gold	Lina Rivas	Weightlifting	Women's 58 kg	12 July
Gold	Luis Javier Mosquera	Weightlifting	Men's 69 kg	12 July
Gold	Hellen Montoya	Roller sports	Women's 500 metres	13 July
Gold	Pedro Causil	Roller sports	Men's 500 metres	13 July
Gold	Miguel Ángel Rodríguez	Squash	Men's singles	13 July
Gold	Mercedes Pérez	Weightlifting	Women's 63 kg	13 July
Gold	Jossimar Calvo	Gymnastics	Men's pommel horse	14 July
Gold	Juan Camilo Vargas; Andrés Herrera	Squash	Men's doubles	14 July
Gold	Leydi Solís	Weightlifting	Women's 69 kg	14 July
Gold	Ubaldina Valoyes	Weightlifting	Women's 75 kg	14 July
Gold	Jossimar Calvo	Gymnastics	Men's parallel bars	15 July
Gold	Jossimar Calvo	Gymnastics	Men's horizontal bar	15 July
Gold	Mariana Duque Mariño	Tennis	Women's singles	16 July
Gold	Natalia Sánchez; Ana Rendón; Maira Sepúlveda	Archery	Women's team	17 July
Gold	Fernando Gaviria	Cycling	Men's omnium	17 July
Gold	Fabián Puerta	Cycling	Men's keirin	19 July
Gold	Fernando Gaviria; Juan Esteban Arango; Arles Castro; Jhonatan Restrepo	Cycling	Men's team pursuit	19 July
Gold	Mariajo Uribe	Golf	Women's individual	19 July
Gold	Marcelo Rozo	Golf	Men's individual	19 July
Gold	Mateo Gomez; Paola Moreno; Marcelo Rozo; Mariajo Uribe	Golf	Mixed team	19 July
Gold	Caterine Ibargüen	Athletics	Women's triple jump	21 July
Gold	Clara Guerrero; Rocio Restrepo	Bowling	Women's doubles	23 July
Gold	Muriel Coneo	Athletics	Women's 1500 metres	25 July
Silver	Ana Segura	Weightlifting	Women's 48 kg	11 July
Silver	Carlos Berna	Weightlifting	Men's 56 kg	11 July
Silver	Francisco Mosquera	Weightlifting	Men's 62 kg	11 July
Silver	Víctor Ortega	Diving	Men's 10 metre platform	12 July
Silver	Pedro Causil	Roller sports	Men's 200 metres time trial	12 July
Silver	Juan Sebastián Sanz	Roller sports	Men's 10,000 metres points	13 July
Silver	Nicolás Barrientos	Tennis	Men's singles	15 July
Silver	Ana Rendón	Archery	Women's individual	18 July
Silver	Saskia van Erven	Fencing	Women's individual foil	22 July
Silver	Rafith Rodríguez	Athletics	Men's 800 metres	23 July
Silver	Jaime González; Manuel Otalora	Bowling	Men's doubles	23 July
Silver	Jorge Vivas	Boxing	Men's middle (75 kg)	24 July
Silver	Deivis Julio	Boxing	Men's heavy (91 kg)	24 July
Silver	Colombia women's national football team: Paula Forero; Isabella Echeverri; Natalia Gaitán; Diana Ospina; Daniela Montoya; Ingrid Vidal; Carolina Pineda; Orianica Velasquez; Maria Usme; Sandra Sepúlveda; Angela Clavijo; Nataly Arias; Tatiana Ariza; Carolina Arias; Maria Santos; Stefany Castaño	Football	Women's tournament	25 July
Bronze	Carlos Calvo; Jossimar Calvo; Jorge Hugo Giraldo; Didier Lugo; Jhonny Muñoz	Gymnastics	Men's team	11 July
Bronze	John Futtinico	Judo	Men's 60 kg	11 July
Bronze	Diego Duque	Roller sports	Men's free programme	12 July
Bronze	Juan Rios; Víctor Ortega	Diving	Men's synchronised 10 metre platform	13 July
Bronze	Jossimar Calvo	Gymnastics	Men's all around	13 July
Bronze	Yuri Alvear	Judo	Women's 70 kg	13 July
Bronze	Pedro Castro	Judo	Men's 81 kg	13 July
Bronze	Catalina Peláez; Laura Tovar	Squash	Women's doubles	13 July
Bronze	Jhor Moreno	Weightlifting	Men's 77 kg	13 July
Bronze	Juan Ruiz	Weightlifting	Men's 85 kg	13 July
Bronze	Danilo Caro	Shooting	Men's trap	14 July
Bronze	Carlos Muñoz	Wrestling	Men's Greco-Roman 75 kg	15 July
Bronze	Cristian Mosquera	Wrestling	Men's Greco-Roman 85 kg	15 July
Bronze	Diana García; Juliana Gaviria	Cycling	Women's team sprint	16 July
Bronze	Catalina Peláez; Laura Tovar; Karol Gonzalez	Squash	Women's team	16 July
Bronze	Carolina Castillo	Wrestling	Women's freestyle 48 kg	16 July
Bronze	Juliana Gaviria	Cycling	Women's keirin	17 July
Bronze	Emir Hernandez	Wrestling	Men's freestyle 57 kg	17 July
Bronze	Jackeline Rentería	Wrestling	Women's freestyle 63 kg	17 July
Bronze	Juliana Gaviria	Cycling	Women's sprint	19 July
Bronze	Ángel Hernández	Gymnastics	Men's trampoline	19 July
Bronze	Harold Avella	Taekwondo	Men's -58 kg	19 July
Bronze	Doris Patiño	Taekwondo	Women's -57 kg	20 July
Bronze	Miguel Trejos	Taekwondo	Men's -68 kg	20 July
Bronze	Yosiris Urrutia	Athletics	Women's triple jump	21 July
Bronze	Ingrit Valencia	Boxing	Women's fly (48-51 kg)	21 July
Bronze	Jessica Bravo	Taekwondo	Women's +67 kg	22 July
Bronze	Ceiber Ávila	Boxing	Men's fly (52 kg)	23 July
Bronze	Juan Carlos Carrillo	Boxing	Men's light heavy (81 kg)	23 July
Bronze	Andrés Rendón	Karate	Men's 60 kg	23 July
Bronze	Rocio Restrepo	Bowling	Women's single	25 July

Medals by sport
Sport	1st place, gold medalist(s)	2nd place, silver medalist(s)	3rd place, bronze medalist(s)	Total
Weightlifting	8	3	2	13
Roller sports	3	2	1	6
Cycling	3	0	3	6
Gymnastics	3	0	3	6
Golf	3	0	0	3
Athletics	2	1	1	4
Squash	2	0	2	4
Bowling	1	1	1	3
Archery	1	1	0	2
Tennis	1	1	0	2
Boxing	0	2	3	5
Diving	0	1	1	2
Fencing	0	1	0	1
Football	0	1	0	1
Wrestling	0	0	5	5
Taekwondo	0	0	4	4
Judo	0	0	3	3
Karate	0	0	1	1
Shooting	0	0	1	1
Total	27	14	31	72

Medals by date
Day	Date	1st place, gold medalist(s)	2nd place, silver medalist(s)	3rd place, bronze medalist(s)	Total
1	11 Jul	2	3	2	5
2	12 Jul	4	2	1	7
3	13 Jul	4	1	7	12
4	14 Jul	4	0	1	5
5	15 Jul	2	1	2	5
6	16 Jul	1	0	3	4
7	17 Jul	2	0	3	5
8	18 Jul	0	1	0	1
9	19 Jul	5	0	3	8
10	20 Jul	0	0	2	2
11	21 Jul	1	0	2	3
12	22 Jul	0	1	1	2
13	23 Jul	1	2	3	6
14	24 Jul	0	2	0	2
15	25 Jul	1	1	1	3
16	26 Jul	0	0	0	0
Total		27	14	31	72

== Archery ==
Colombia qualified the maximum team of three men and three women, for a total of six athletes.

Men

Athlete	Event	Ranking Round		Round of 32	Round of 16	Quarterfinals	Semifinals	Final / BM	Rank
Athlete	Event	Score	Seed	Opposition Score	Opposition Score	Opposition Score	Opposition Score	Opposition Score	Rank
Daniel Betancur	Individual	632	21	Puentes (CUB); W 7–3	Álvarez (MEX); L 0–6	did not advance			=9
Daniel Pacheco	Individual	626	21	Pineda (COL); L 0–6	did not advance				=17
Daniel Pineda	Individual	653	10	Pacheco (COL); W 6–0	Pizarro (PUR); W 6–5	Lyon (CAN); L 3–6	did not advance		=5
Daniel Betancur; Daniel Pacheco; Daniel Pineda	Team	1911	6	—N/a		Cuba; L 4–5	did not advance		5

Women

Athlete	Event	Ranking Round		Round of 32	Round of 16	Quarterfinals	Semifinals	Final / BM	Rank
Athlete	Event	Score	Seed	Opposition Score	Opposition Score	Opposition Score	Opposition Score	Opposition Score	Rank
Ana Rendón	Individual	630	9	Marquez (CHI); W 6–2	Dos Santos (BRA); W 6–2	Sepúlveda (COL); W 6–2	Hinojosa (MEX); W 6–0	Lorig (USA); L 2–6	2nd place, silver medalist(s)
Natalia Sánchez	Individual	646	5	Faisal (ARG); W 6–0	Feitosa (BRA); W 6–0	Hinojosa (MEX); L 5–6	did not advance		=5
Maira Sepúlveda	Individual	601	16	Mendiberry (ARG); W 7–3	Valencia (MEX); W 6–4	Rendón (COL); L 2–6	did not advance		=5
Ana Rendón; Natalia Sánchez; Maira Sepúlveda	Team	1877	3	—N/a	Bye	Canada; W 5–1	United States; W 6–2	Mexico; W 5–1	1st place, gold medalist(s)

== Athletics ==
Colombia qualified 22 athletes (12 men and 10 women).

Key

- Note – Ranks given for track events are for the entire round
- Q = Qualified for the next round
- q = Qualified for the next round as a fastest loser or, in field events, by position without achieving the qualifying target
- NR = National record
- PB = Personal best
- SB = Seasonal best
- DNF = Did not finish
- DSQ = Disqualified
- N/A = Round not applicable for the event

Men
Track

Athlete	Event	Round 1		Semifinal		Final	
Athlete	Event	Result	Rank	Result	Rank	Result	Rank
Diego Palomeque	200 m	10.44	19	did not advance			
Bernardo Baloyes	200 m	20.89	20	did not advance			
Rafith Rodríguez	800 m	—N/a		1:49.06	3 Q	1:47.23	2nd place, silver medalist(s)
Gerard Giraldo	1500 m	—N/a				3:56.13	14
Gerard Giraldo	3000 m steeplechase	—N/a				DNF	
Jose Mauricio Gonzalez	5000 m	—N/a				16:13.05	14
Jose Mauricio Gonzalez	10,000 m	—N/a				DNF	
Éider Arévalo	20 km walk	—N/a				1:25:50	5
Ivan Garrido	20 km walk	—N/a				DSQ	
James Rendón	50 km walk	—N/a				4:06:52	6
Jorge Armando Ruiz	50 km walk	—N/a				DSQ	

Field

Athlete	Event	Final	
Athlete	Event	Distance	Rank
Mauricio Ortega	Discus throw	61.33	7
Dayron Márquez	Javelin throw	75.86	6
Jhon Murillo	Triple jump	16.08	10

Women
Track

Athlete	Event	Semifinal		Final	
Athlete	Event	Result	Rank	Result	Rank
Muriel Coneo	1500 m	—N/a		4:09.05 NR	1st place, gold medalist(s)
Carolina Tabares	5000 m	—N/a		16:17.62	9
Carolina Tabares	10,000 m	—N/a		33:42.54	10
Brigitte Merlano	100 m hurdles	13.01	7 q	13.24	6
Leidy Tobon	Marathlon	—N/a		DNF	
Sandra Arenas	20 km walk	—N/a		1:32:36 SB	4
Sandra Galvis	20 km walk	—N/a		DNF	

Field

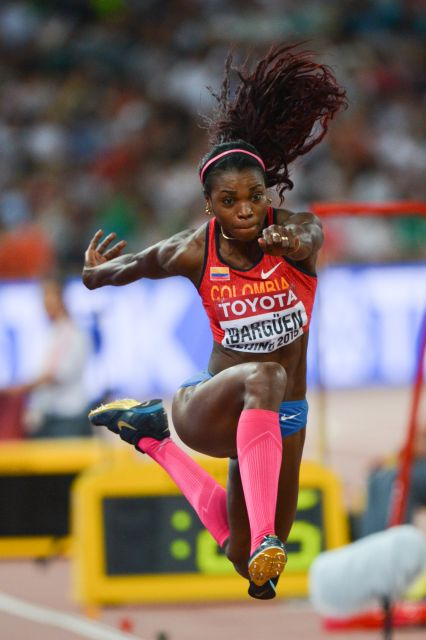
Caterine Ibargüen won gold in the triple jump event (pictured here at the 2015 World Championships

Athlete	Event	Final	
Athlete	Event	Distance	Rank
Flor Ruiz	Javelin throw	58.08	5
Caterine Ibargüen	Triple jump	15.08	1st place, gold medalist(s)
Yosiri Urrutia	Triple jump	14.38 SB	3rd place, bronze medalist(s)

Combined events – Heptathlon

Athlete	Event	100H	HJ	SP	200 m	LJ	JT	800 m	Final	Rank
Evelis Aguilar	Result	14.35	1.68	12.55	23.99	6.15	41.02	2:13.95	5930 NR	4
Evelis Aguilar	Points	929	830	698	982	896	687	908	5930 NR	4

== Baseball ==
Colombia qualified a men's team of 24 athletes.

=== Men's tournament ===
Roster

The following is Colombia's men's baseball team for the 2015 Pan American Games. The position of the player is listed in parentheses.

- Carlos Willoughby (U)
- Charlie Mirabal (IF/OF)
- Ronald Luna (IF/OF)
- Harold Rumion (P)
- Efrain Contreras (IF/OF)
- Sneider Batista (IF/OF)
- Diover Avila (OF)
- Jonathan Lozada (U)
- Ismael Castro (IF/OF)
- Hector Acuna (IF/OF)
- Harold Ramírez (IF/OF)
- Randy Consuegra (P)
- Yesid Salazar (P)
- Jayson De Aguas (C/IF)
- Jorge Ariza (C/IF)
- Karl Triana (P)
- Tito Polo (IF/OF)
- Dumas Garcia (P)
- Steve Brown (IF/OF)
- Ronald Ramirez (P)
- Nabil Crismatt (P)
- Juan Corpas (P)
- Javier Ortiz (P)
- Cristian Mendoza (P)

Legend: C = Catcher, INF = Infielder, OF = Outfielder, P = Pitcher, U = Utility

Group A

Pos	Team	Pld	W	L	RF	RA	RD	PCT	GB	Qualification
1	Canada	6	5	1	38	15	+23	.833	—	Advance to the semifinals
2	United States	6	4	2	33	22	+11	.667 (Note: In the 3-way tie for 2nd place, all three teams went 1-1 head to head. The 2nd tiebreaker, Team Quality Balance, was used to identify and eliminate the last team in the group (Puerto Rico). The tie between the other two teams was then broken on the basis of the head-to-head result between them (United States defeating Cuba).)	1	Advance to the semifinals
3	Cuba	6	4	2	41	23	+18	.667	1	Advance to the semifinals
4	Puerto Rico	6	4	2	40	44	−4	.667	1	Advance to the semifinals
5	Dominican Republic	6	3	3	30	35	−5	.500	2	
6	Nicaragua	6	1	5	22	43	−21	.167	4	
7	Colombia	6	0	6	22	44	−22	.000	5	

Notes:

11 July 2015; 12:00	Colombia	3–10	Cuba	President’s Choice Ajax Pan Am Ballpark – Main Field, Ajax; Attendance: 1,600
11 July 2015; 12:00		Boxscore		President’s Choice Ajax Pan Am Ballpark – Main Field, Ajax; Attendance: 1,600

12 July 2015; 15:30	Canada	10–3	Colombia	President’s Choice Ajax Pan Am Ballpark – Second Field, Ajax; Attendance: 1,257
12 July 2015; 15:30		Boxscore		President’s Choice Ajax Pan Am Ballpark – Second Field, Ajax; Attendance: 1,257

13 July 2015; 15:30	Colombia	3–5	United States	President’s Choice Ajax Pan Am Ballpark – Second Field, Ajax; Attendance: 1,400
13 July 2015; 15:30		Boxscore		President’s Choice Ajax Pan Am Ballpark – Second Field, Ajax; Attendance: 1,400

14 July 2015; 12:00	Colombia	4–7	Nicaragua	President’s Choice Ajax Pan Am Ballpark – Main Field, Ajax; Attendance: 1,357
14 July 2015; 12:00		Boxscore		President’s Choice Ajax Pan Am Ballpark – Main Field, Ajax; Attendance: 1,357

15 July 2015; 15:30	Puerto Rico	8–7	Colombia	President’s Choice Ajax Pan Am Ballpark – Second Field, Ajax; Attendance: 738
15 July 2015; 15:30		Boxscore		President’s Choice Ajax Pan Am Ballpark – Second Field, Ajax; Attendance: 738

17 July 2015; 15:30	Dominican Republic	4–1	Colombia	President’s Choice Ajax Pan Am Ballpark – Second Field, Ajax; Attendance: 573
17 July 2015; 15:30		Boxscore		President’s Choice Ajax Pan Am Ballpark – Second Field, Ajax; Attendance: 573

== Beach volleyball ==
Colombia qualified a women's pair.

Athlete	Event	Preliminary round				Elimination round	Quarterfinals	5th to 8th	5th place match	
Athlete	Event	Opposition Score	Opposition Score	Opposition Score	Rank	Opposition Score	Opposition Score	Opposition Score	Opposition Score	Rank
Andrea Galindo; Claudia Galindo	Women's	Orellana / Recinos (GUA); W 21–14, 21–15	Molina / Soler (ESA); W 21–18, 21–12	Larsen / Metter (USA); L 14–21, 18–21	2 Q	Bernier Colon / Torruella (PUR); W 21–13, 22–20	Flores / Martinez (CUB); L 18–21, 12–21	Alfaro / Cope (CRC); W 21–13, 19–21, 15–12	Larsen / Metter (USA); L 13–21, 21–18, 11–15	6

== Boxing ==
Men

Athlete	Event	Preliminaries	Quarterfinals	Semifinals	Final	Rank
Athlete	Event	Opposition Result	Opposition Result	Opposition Result	Opposition Result	Rank
Yuberjen Martínez	Light flyweight	Bye	Finol (VEN); L 0–3	did not advance		
Ceiber Ávila	Flyweight	Bye	Bermúdez (VEN); W 3–0	Veitía (CUB); L 0–3	Did not advance	3rd place, bronze medalist(s)
Faider Hernández	Lightweight	Delgado (MEX); L 0–3	did not advance			
Jorge Vivas	Middleweight	Bye	Sánchez (DOM); W 2–1	Rodríguez (MEX); W 2–1	López (CUB); L 0–3	2nd place, silver medalist(s)
Juan Carlos Carrillo	Light heavyweight	Bye	Escudero (ARG); W 3–0	La Cruz (CUB); L 0–3	Did not advance	3rd place, bronze medalist(s)
Deivi Julio	Heavyweight	—N/a	Castillo (ECU); W 3–0	El-Mais (CAN); W WO	López (CUB); L 1–2	2nd place, silver medalist(s)

Women

Athlete	Event	Quarterfinals	Semifinals	Final	Rank
Athlete	Event	Opposition Result	Opposition Result	Opposition Result	Rank
Ingrit Valencia	Flyweight	Villarroel (BOL); W 3–0	Bujold (CAN); L 0–2	Did not advance	3rd place, bronze medalist(s)
Jessica Caicedo	Light heavyweight	Pérez (ARG); L 0–2	did not advance		

== Bowling ==
Colombia qualified a full team of two male and two female athletes.

Singles

Athlete	Event	Qualification															Round robin	Semifinals	Finals	
Athlete	Event	Block 1 (Games 1–6)						Block 2 (Games 7–12)						Total	Average	Rank	Round robin	Semifinals	Finals	
Athlete	Event	1	2	3	4	5	6	7	8	9	10	11	12	Total	Average	Rank	Score Rank	Opposition Scores	Opposition Scores	Rank
Jaime González	Men's	180	204	216	175	181	212	229	189	187	196	175	211	2355	196.3	18	did not advance			
Manuel Otalora	Men's	217	188	170	143	166	174	186	194	200	172	186	214	2210	184.2	27	did not advance			
Clara Guerrero	Women's	213	225	218	175	214	238	256	215	236	203	226	215	2634	219.5	2 Q	1565; 7	did not advance		
Rocio Restrepo	Women's	187	238	213	245	256	179	176	202	265	216	172	201	2550	212.5	6 Q	1720; 3 Q	Pluhowsky (USA); L 212–214	Did not advance	3rd place, bronze medalist(s)

Doubles

Athlete	Event	Block 1 (Games 1–6)								Block 2 (Games 7–12)								Grand Total	Final Rank
Athlete	Event	1	2	3	4	5	6	Total	Average	7	8	9	10	11	12	Total	Average	Grand Total	Final Rank
Jaime González; Manuel Otalora	Men's	167	269	215	198	181	224	1254	209.0	228	199	204	240	201	248	2574	214.5	5289	2nd place, silver medalist(s)
Jaime González; Manuel Otalora	Men's	201	256	237	225	230	202	1351	225.2	243	247	200	190	279	205	2715	226.3	5289	2nd place, silver medalist(s)
Clara Guerrero; Rocio Restrepo	Women's	223	143	181	211	186	232	1176	196.0	217	246	226	215	258	204	2542	211.8	5074	1st place, gold medalist(s)
Clara Guerrero; Rocio Restrepo	Women's	212	187	168	221	246	199	1233	205.5	211	228	218	229	191	222	2532	211.0	5074	1st place, gold medalist(s)

== Canoeing ==
=== Slalom ===
Colombia qualified the following boats (2 male athletes):

Men

Athlete(s)	Event	Preliminary						Semifinal		Final	
Athlete(s)	Event	Run 1	Rank	Run 2	Rank	Best	Rank	Time	Rank	Time	Rank
Andrés Pérez	C-1	176.31	6	216.63	8	176.31	7 Q	190.42	6 Q	196.18	6
Breiner Matiz; Andrés Pérez	C-2	246.17	6	306.60	6	246.17	6	did not qualify			
Breiner Matiz	K-1	125.95	6	108.31	6	108.31	7 Q	120.04	7	did not qualify	

=== Sprint ===
Colombia qualified 6 athletes in the sprint discipline (1 in men's kayak, 4 in women's kayak and 1 in men's canoe).

Men

Athlete	Event	Heats		Semifinals		Final	
Athlete	Event	Time	Rank	Time	Rank	Time	Rank
Yojan Cano	K-1 200 m	41.882	6 QS	43.837	4	did not advance	
Yojan Cano	K-1 1000 m	—N/a				4:06.113	7
Sergio Díaz	C-1 200 m	45.675	5 QS	45.259	2 QF	45.942	9
Sergio Díaz	C-1 1000 m	—N/a				4:20.547	5

Women

Athlete	Event	Heats		Semifinals		Final	
Athlete	Event	Time	Rank	Time	Rank	Time	Rank
Tatiana Muñoz	K-1 200 m	46.398	5 QS	45.809	2 QF	48.037	8
Tatiana Muñoz	K-1 500 m	1:59.079	2 QF	Bye		2:14.300	8
Ruth Niño; Tatiana Muñoz	K-2 500 m	—N/a				1:55.496	7
Katerine Moreno; Laura Pacheco; Ruth Niño; Tatiana Muñoz	K-4 500 m	—N/a				1:45.674	7

Qualification Legend: QF = Qualify to final; QS = Qualify to semifinal

== Cycling ==
=== Mountain biking ===
Athlete	Event	Time	Rank
Fabio Castañeda	Men's cross-country	1:36:30	5
Luis Mejía	Men's cross-country	DNF	
Angela Parra	Women's cross-country	1:38:21	8
Yosiana Quintero	Women's cross-country	1:39:43	9

=== Road ===
Men

Athlete	Event	Final	
Athlete	Event	Time	Rank
Juan Arango	Road race	DNS	
Alex Cano	Road race	3:53:23	29
Daniel Jaramillo	Road race	3:54:59	30
Diego Milán	Road race	3:46:35	10
Alex Cano	Time trial	48:27.71	9
Fernando Gaviria	Time trial	48:23.38	8

Women

Athlete	Event	Final	
Athlete	Event	Time	Rank
Lorena Colmenares	Road race	2:07:52	16
Camila Valbuena	Road race	2:07:55	25
María Luisa Calle	Time trial	DNS	
Camila Valbuena	Time trial	28:54.44	8

== Diving ==
Colombia qualified six divers (four men and two women).

Men

Athlete	Event	Preliminary		Final	
Athlete	Event	Points	Rank	Points	Rank
Sebastián Morales	3 m springboard	391.35	4 Q	380.20	9
Sebastián Villa	3 m springboard	345.15	11 Q	397.40	7
Sebastián Villa	10 m platform	442.85	1 Q	393.45	6
Víctor Ortega	10 m platform	420.00	6 Q	455.15	2nd place, silver medalist(s)
Sebastián Morales; Sebastián Villa	Synchronized 3 m springboard	—N/a		371.64	5
Víctor Ortega; Juan Guillermo Rios	Synchronized 10 m platform	—N/a		403.23	3rd place, bronze medalist(s)

Women

Athlete	Event	Preliminary		Final	
Athlete	Event	Points	Rank	Points	Rank
Diana Pineda	3 m springboard	255.25	10 Q	288.15	8
Manuela Rios	3 m springboard	195.45	13	did not advance	
Diana Pineda; Manuela Rios	Synchronized 3 m springboard	—N/a		246.87	5

== Fencing ==
Colombia qualified 13 fencers (9 men, 4 women).

Men

Athlete	Event	Pool Round		Round of 16	Quarterfinals	Semifinals	Final / BM	
Athlete	Event	Result	Seed	Opposition Score	Opposition Score	Opposition Score	Opposition Score	Rank
Gustavo Coqueco	Épée	2 V	10 Q	Benjamin Bratton (USA); L 12–15	did not advance			
Jhon Rodriguez	Épée	3 V	8 Q	Paris Inostroza (CHI); W 15–12	Hugues Boisvert-Simard (CAN); L 10–15	did not advance		
Andrés Zarate; Gustavo Coqueco; Jhon Rodriguez	Épée Team	—N/a			Argentina; W 45–31	United States; L 42–45	Cuba; L 39–43	4
Dimitri Clairet	Foil	1 V	18	did not advance				
Alejandro Hernández Vasquez	Foil	1 V	17	did not advance				
Dimitri Clairet; Alejandro Hernández Vasquez; Santiago Pachon	Foil Team	—N/a			Mexico; L 21–45	Classification semifinal Chile; W 35+–35	5th place final Canada; L 22–45	6
Sebastian Cuellar Peña	Sabre	1 V	15 Q	Ricardo Bustamante (ARG); L 12–15	did not advance			
Luis Enrique Correa Vila	Sabre	1 V	14 Q	Shaul Gordon (CAN); L 7–15	did not advance			
Carlos Enrique Correa Vila; Luis Enrique Correa Vila; Sebastian Cuellar Peña	Sabre Team	—N/a			Canada; L 25–45	Classification semifinal Mexico; L 44–45	7th place final Chile; L 38–45	8

Women

Athlete	Event	Pool Round		Round of 16	Quarterfinals	Semifinals	Final / BM	
Athlete	Event	Result	Seed	Opposition Score	Opposition Score	Opposition Score	Opposition Score	Rank
Laskmi Lozano	Épée	2 V	11 Q	Nathalie Moellhausen (BRA); L 4–15	did not advance			
Diana Rodriguez	Épée	1 V	17	did not advance				
Laskmi Lozano; Diana Rodriguez; Oriana Karaindros	Épée Team	—N/a			Venezuela; L 38–45	Classification semifinal Canada; L 39–45	7th place final Argentina; W 45–39	7
Saskia Loretta van Erven Garcia	Foil	4 V	3 Q	Nataly Michel (MEX); W 15–9	Isis Giménez (VEN); W 15–3	Alanna Goldie (CAN); W 15–3	Lee Kiefer (USA); L 11–15	2nd place, silver medalist(s)

== Football ==
Colombia qualified a women's team of 18 athletes. Only 16 athletes were on the final roster.

=== Women's tournament ===
Roster

Head coach: Felipe Taborda

No.	Pos.	Player	Date of birth (age)	Club
1	GK	Paula Forero	25 January 1992 (aged 23)	(United States Soccer Federation) Barry University
12	GK	Sandra Sepúlveda	3 March 1988 (aged 27)	(Colombian Football Federation) Club Formas Íntimas
22	GK	Stefany Castaño	11 January 1994 (aged 21)	(United States Soccer Federation) Graceland University
2	DF	Isabella Echeverri	16 June 1994 (aged 21)	(United States Soccer Federation) University of Toledo
3	MF	Natalia Gaitán (c)	3 April 1991 (aged 24)	(Colombian Football Federation) Club Gol Star
4	MF	Diana Ospina	3 March 1989 (aged 26)	(Colombian Football Federation) Club Formas Íntimas
6	MF	Daniela Montoya	22 August 1990 (aged 24)	(Colombian Football Federation) Club Formas Íntimas
7	FW	Ingrid Vidal	22 April 1991 (aged 24)	(Colombian Football Federation) Generaciones Palmiranas
8	MF	Mildrey Pineda	1 October 1989 (aged 25)	(Colombian Football Federation) Generaciones Palmiranas
9	FW	Oriánica Velásquez	1 August 1989 (aged 25)	(Colombian Football Federation) Club Gol Star
11	MF	Catalina Usme	25 December 1989 (aged 25)	(Colombian Football Federation) Club Formas Íntimas
13	DF	Ángela Clavijo	1 September 1993 (aged 21)	(Colombian Football Federation) Kamatsa
14	DF	Nataly Arias	2 April 1986 (aged 29)	(United States Soccer Federation) Atlanta Silverbacks
15	DF	Tatiana Ariza	21 February 1991 (aged 24)	(Colombian Football Federation) Club Gol Star
17	DF	Carolina Arias	2 September 1990 (aged 24)	(Colombian Football Federation) Generaciones Palmirinas
18	MF	Leicy Santos	16 May 1996 (aged 19)	(Colombian Football Federation) Club Besser

Group A

Pos	Team	Pld	W	D	L	GF	GA	GD	Pts	Qualification
1	Colombia	3	2	1	0	4	1	+3	7	Medal round
2	Mexico	3	2	0	1	6	3	+3	6	Medal round
3	Trinidad and Tobago	3	0	2	1	4	6	−2	2	
4	Argentina	3	0	1	2	3	7	−4	1	

Source: Toronto 2015
July 11, 2015
11:05

Mexico	0–1	Colombia
	Report	Usme 65'

Hamilton Pan Am Soccer Stadium, Hamilton
Referee: Maurees Skeete (Guyana)

July 14, 2015
20:35

Colombia	1–1	Trinidad and Tobago
Vidal 4'	Report	Cordner 87'

Hamilton Pan Am Soccer Stadium, Hamilton
Referee: Marie-Soleil Beaudoin (Canada)

July 18, 2015
20:35

Argentina	0–2	Colombia
	Report	Arias 44'; Usme 51'

Hamilton Pan Am Soccer Stadium, Hamilton
Referee: Alondra Arellano (Mexico)

Semifinals

July 22, 2015
20:35

Colombia	1–0	Canada
Ospina 29'	Report

Hamilton Pan Am Soccer Stadium, Hamilton
Referee: Mirian Leon (El Salvador)

Gold medal match

July 25, 2015
18:35

(gold) Brazil	4–0	Colombia (silver)
Formiga 7'; Maurine 75'; Alves 86'; Fabiana 90+3'	Report

Hamilton Pan Am Soccer Stadium, Hamilton
Referee: Mirian León (El Salvador)

== Golf ==
Colombia qualified a full team of four golfers. Colombia won all three gold medals that were available in the sport.

Athlete(s)	Event	Final					
Athlete(s)	Event	Round 1	Round 2	Round 3	Round 4	Total	Rank
Mateo Gómez	Men's individual	75	71	75	76	297 (+9)	=20
Marcelo Rozo	Men's individual	68	76	63	68	275 (–13)	1st place, gold medalist(s)
Paola Moreno	Women's individual	73	71	71	73	288 (E)	5
Mariajo Uribe	Women's individual	69	70	70	70	279 (–9)	1st place, gold medalist(s)
Mateo Gómez; Marcelo Rozo; Paola Moreno; Mariajo Uribe	Mixed team	137	141	133	138	549 (–27)	1st place, gold medalist(s)

== Gymnastics ==
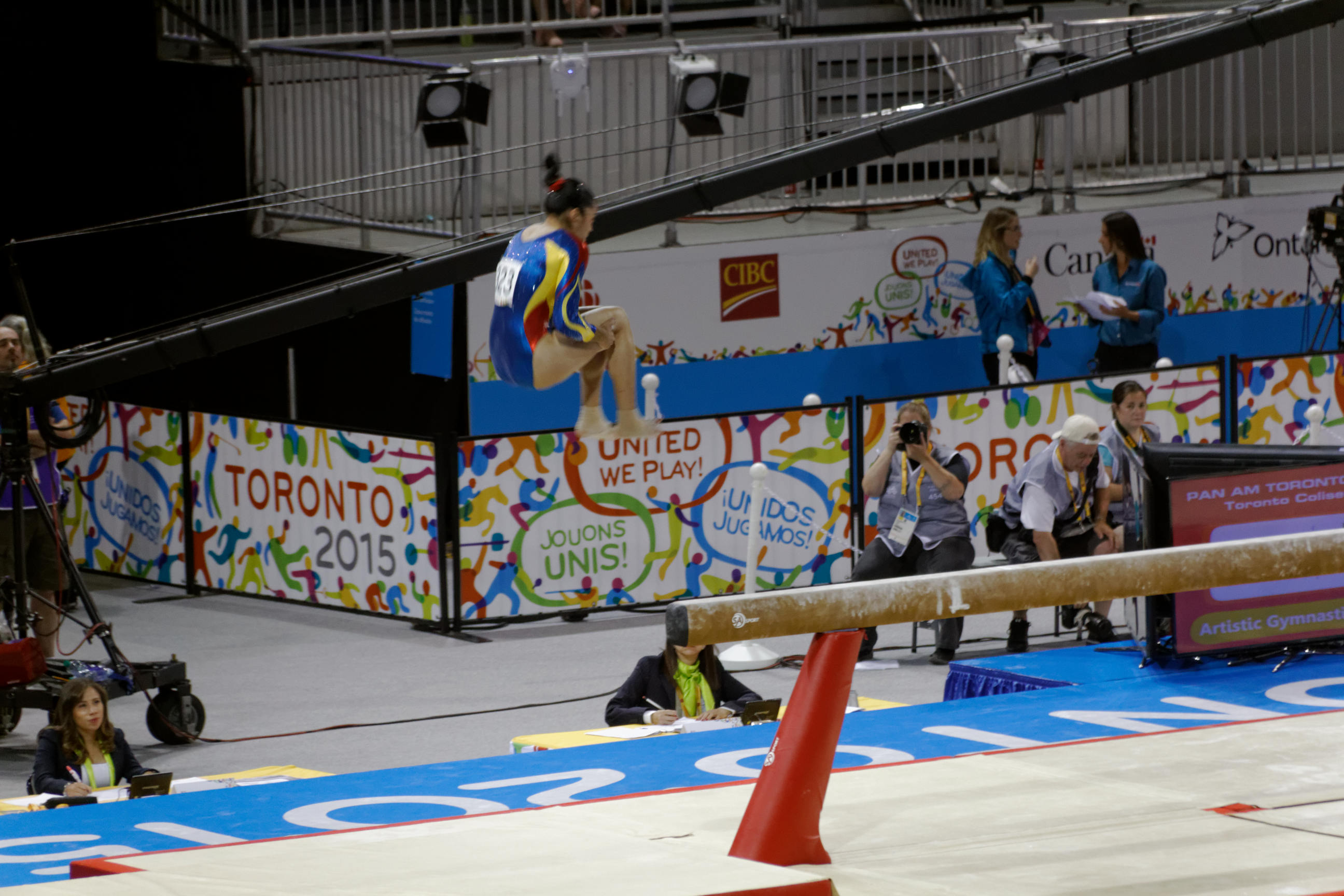
Ginna Escobar competing on the beam.

Colombia qualified twelve gymnasts (six of each gender) across all three disciplines.

=== Artistic ===
Colombia qualified gymnasts.

Men
Team & Individual Qualification

Athlete	Event	Final							
Athlete	Event	Apparatus						Total	Rank
Athlete	Event	F	PH	R	V	PB	HB	Total	Rank
	Qualification								
Total	Team								

Qualification Legend: Q = Qualified to apparatus final

Women
Team & Individual Qualification

Athlete	Event	Final					
Athlete	Event	Apparatus				Total	Rank
Athlete	Event	F	V	UB	BB	Total	Rank
	Qualification						
Total	Team						

Qualification Legend: Q = Qualified to apparatus final

=== Rhythmic ===
Colombia qualified one rhythmic gymnast.

Individual

Athlete	Event	Final					
Athlete	Event	Hoop	Ball	Clubs	Ribbon	Total	Rank
Lina Dussan	Individual	12.250	10.867	12.333	11.892	47.342	12

Qualification Legend: Q = Qualified to apparatus final

=== Trampoline ===
Colombia qualified 1 trampoline gymnast.

Athlete	Event	Qualification		Final	
Athlete	Event	Score	Rank	Score	Rank
Ángel Hernández	Men's	101.855	3	55.190	3rd place, bronze medalist(s)

== Judo ==
Colombia qualified a team of eight judokas (two men and six women).

Men

Athlete	Event	Round of 16	Quarterfinals	Semifinals	Repechage	Final / BM	
Athlete	Event	Opposition Result	Opposition Result	Opposition Result	Opposition Result	Opposition Result	Rank
John Futtinico	−60 kg	Damas (MEX); W 100–00S1	Kitadai (BRA); L 00S2–010S1	Did not advance	Birbrier (ARG); W 100–00S1	Postigos (PER); W 100–000	3rd place, bronze medalist(s)
Pedro Castro	−81 kg	Turcios (ESA); W 001S3–000S2	Lucenti (ARG); W 000–000	Stevens (USA); L 000H–110	Bye	Burt (CAN); W 010S2–000	3rd place, bronze medalist(s)

Women

Athlete	Event	Round of 16	Quarterfinals	Semifinals	Repechage	Final / BM	
Athlete	Event	Opposition Result	Opposition Result	Opposition Result	Opposition Result	Opposition Result	Rank
Luz Álvarez	−48 kg	Cobos (ECU); L 000S2–000S1	did not advance				
Tatiana Lucumi	−52 kg	Romero (CUB); L 000–100	did not advance				
Yadinis Amarís	−57 kg	Bye	Plaza (ECU); L 000S1–001S2	Did not advance	Barrios (VEN); L 000–100S2	did not advance	
Diana Velasco	−63 kg	Dominguez (GUA); W 000S1–000S2	García (ECU); L 000–100	Did not advance	Arteaga (VEN); W 100–000	Silva (BRA); L 000S1–011S1	=5
Yuri Alvear	−70 kg	Bye	Poo (MEX); W 100–000	Cortés (CUB); L 000–100S2	Bye	Chalá (ECU); W 010–002S2	3rd place, bronze medalist(s)
Luisa Bonilla	−78 kg	Usnayo (CHI); L 000–100	did not advance				

== Karate ==
Colombia qualified 4 karetekas (three men and one woman).

Athlete	Event	Round robin				Semifinals	Final	
Athlete	Event	Opposition Result	Opposition Result	Opposition Result	Rank	Opposition Result	Opposition Result	Rank
Andrés Rendón	Men's –60 kg	Soffia (CHI); W 2–1	Larrosa (URU); W 2–0	Brose (BRA); D 0–0	2 Q	Martínez (VEN); L 1–5	Did not advance	3rd place, bronze medalist(s)
José Ramírez	Men's –67 kg	Vargas (MEX); D 0–0	Ferreras (DOM); L 0–3	Madera (VEN); L 2–3	4	did not advance		
Juan Landázuri	Men's –75 kg	Boily-Martineau (CAN); L 3–5	Nicastro (VEN); D 2–2	Gustavo (DOM); W 3–2	3	did not advance		
Stella Urango*	Women's –55 kg	Reyes (CHI); L 0–8	Robinson (USA); L 0–8	Vindrola (PER); L 0–8	4	did not advance		

- Stella Urango ruptured her knee before the games and could not compete. All three defeats were forfeits.

== Racquetball ==
Colombia qualified a team of three men and two women for a total of five athletes.

== Roller sports ==
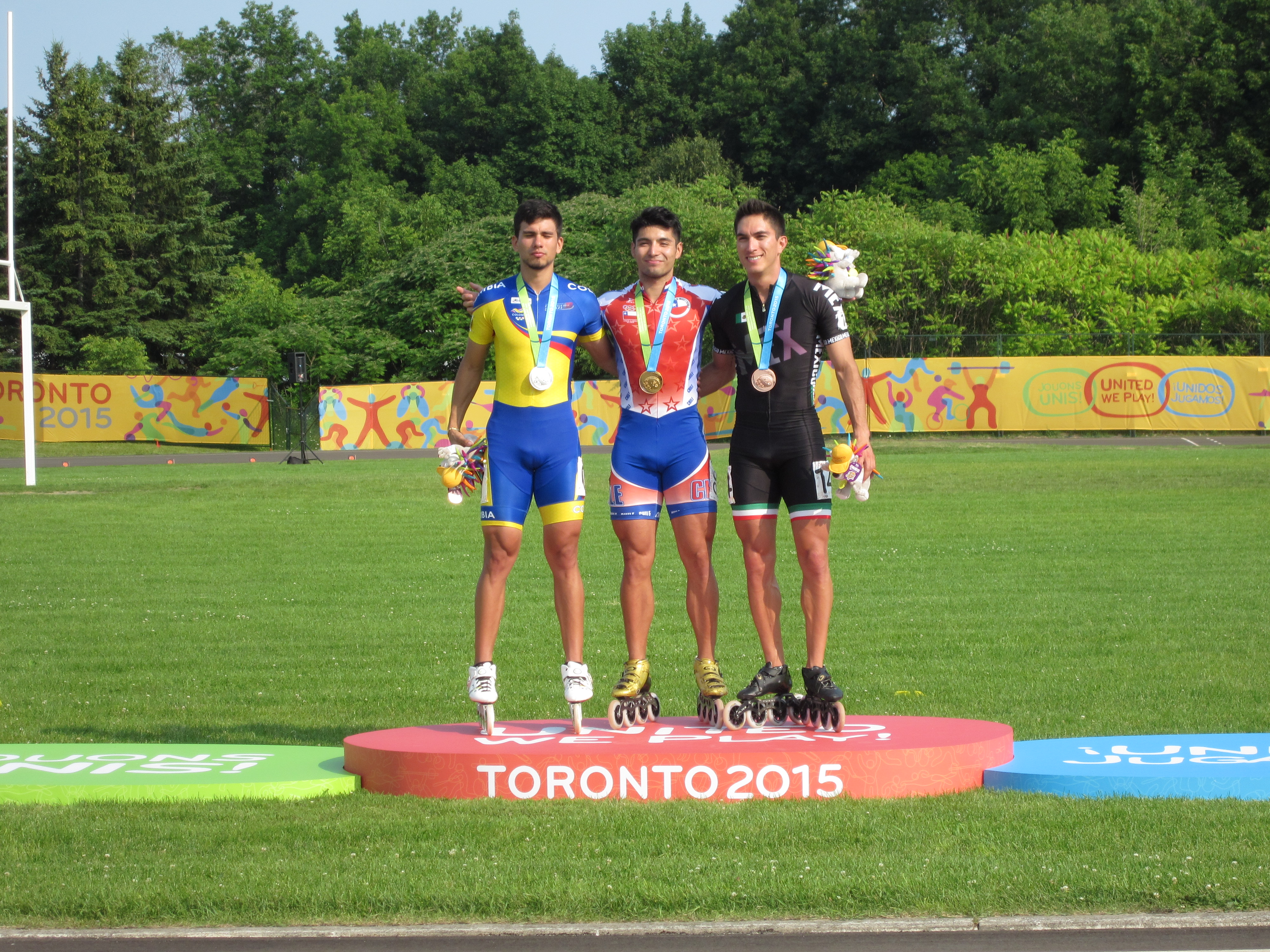
Men's 200 metres time-trial medalists. Causil with silver medal.

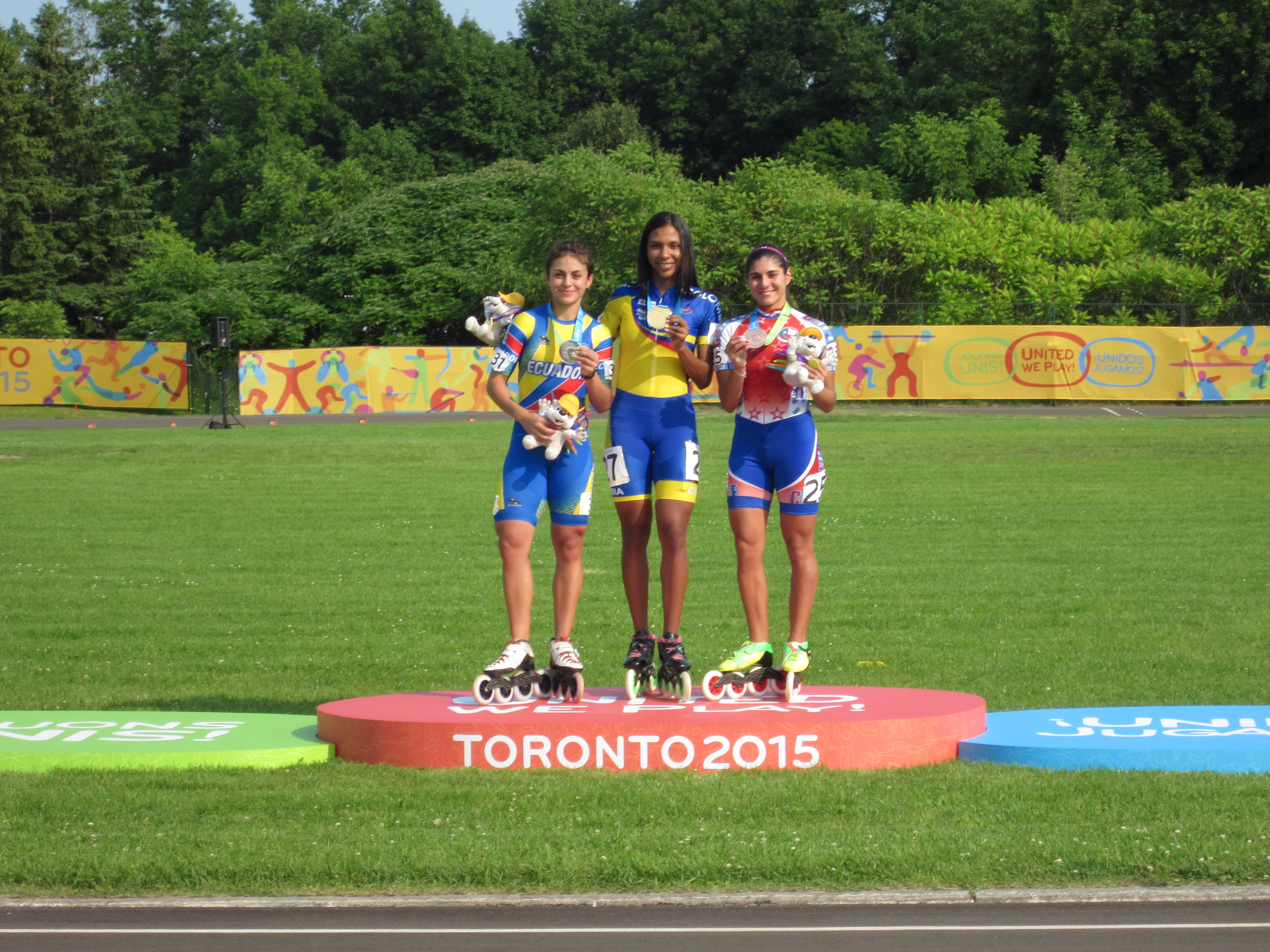
Women's 200 metres time-trial medalists. Montoya with her gold medal.

Colombia qualified a full team of six athletes (three male and three female). 4 athletes competed in the speed events, while the other two competed in the figure skating competition.

=== Figure ===
Athlete	Event	Short program		Free program		Final	
Athlete	Event	Points	Rank	Points	Rank	Points	Rank
Diego Duque	Men's free skating	127.40	4 Q	123.10	3	496.70	3rd place, bronze medalist(s)
Nataly Otalora	Women's free skating	106.10	6 Q	119.30	5	464.00	5

=== Speed ===
Athlete	Event	Semifinal		Final	
Athlete	Event	Time	Rank	Time/Points	Rank
Pedro Causil	Men's 200 m time trial	—N/a		16.149	2nd place, silver medalist(s)
Pedro Causil	Men's 500 m	39.955	1 Q	40.650	1st place, gold medalist(s)
Juan Sebastián Sanz	Men's 10,000 m points race	—N/a		13	2nd place, silver medalist(s)
Hellen Montoya	Women's 200 m time trial	—N/a		17.653	1st place, gold medalist(s)
Hellen Montoya	Women's 500 m	43.506	1 Q	43.370	1st place, gold medalist(s)
Johana Viveros	Women's 10,000 m points race	—N/a		did not finish	

== Rugby sevens ==
Colombia qualified a women's team for a total of 12 athletes. This will be the first time ever that the country competes in the sport at the Pan American Games.

=== Women's tournament ===
Roster

The Colombian squad.

- Isabel Romero
- Guadalupe López
- Solangie Delgado
- Estefanía Ramírez
- Laura González
- Maria Monroy
- Laura Ortiz
- Alejandra Betancur
- Ana Ramírez
- Nicole Acevedo
- Camila Lopera
- Luz Zapata

Group A

Team	Pld	W	D	L	PF	PA	PD	Pts	Qualification
Canada	5	5	0	0	230	12	+218	15	Qualified for gold-medal match
United States	5	4	0	1	203	48	+155	13	Qualified for gold-medal match
Brazil	5	3	0	2	115	67	+48	11	Qualified for bronze-medal match
Argentina	5	1	1	3	57	131	−74	8	Qualified for bronze-medal match
Colombia	5	1	1	3	29	148	−119	8	
Mexico	5	0	0	5	24	252	−228	5	

11 July 2015
10:05

Canada	55–0	Colombia
	Report

Exhibition Stadium, Toronto

11 July 2015
12:49

United States	40–0	Colombia
	Report

Exhibition Stadium, Toronto

11 July 2015
18:17

Colombia	24–19	Mexico
	Report

Exhibition Stadium, Toronto

12 July 2015
10:27

Colombia	0–29	Brazil
	Report

Exhibition Stadium, Toronto

12 July 2015
12:49

Argentina	5–5	Colombia
	Report

Exhibition Stadium, Toronto

Fifth place match

12 July 2015
17:33

Mexico	17–17	Colombia
	Report

Exhibition Stadium, Toronto

== Sailing ==
Colombia qualified 4 boats (7 sailors).

Athlete	Event	Race														Net Points	Final Rank
Athlete	Event	1	2	3	4	5	6	7	8	9	10	11	12	13	M*	Net Points	Final Rank
Santiago Grillo	Men's RS:X	(7)	6	6	7	6	6	6	7	5	3	6	7	7	DNQ	72	7
Andrey Quintero	Laser	14	9	15	9	13	4	10	14	15	(16)	15	10	—N/a	DNQ	128	13
Esteban Echavarria; Juan Restrepo	Snipe	5	6	3	8	2	8	6	4	3	1	(10)	5	—N/a	4	55	4
Raymond Jacob; Loreana Jacob; Julian Ramirez	Lightning	6	7	3	3	6	7	5	(8) RET	6	6	7	7	—N/a	DNQ	63	7

== Shooting ==
Colombia qualified six shooters.

Men

Athlete	Event	Qualification		Semifinal		Final	
Athlete	Event	Points	Rank	Points	Rank	Points	Rank
Alex Peralta	Men's 10 m air pistol	557	23	—N/a		did not advance	
Alex Peralta	Men's 50 m pistol	541	5 Q	—N/a		70.0	8
Diego Duarte	Men's skeet	110	24	did not advance			
Danilo Caro	Men's trap	117	1 Q	10	4 QB	13	3rd place, bronze medalist(s)
Danilo Caro	Men's double trap	118	7	did not advance			
Pedro Gutiérrez	Men's trap	98	19	did not advance			
Hernando Vega	Men's double trap	103	16	did not advance			
Amanda Mondol	Women's 25 metre pistol	575	1 Q	8	7	did not advance	
Amanda Mondol	Women's 10 metre air pistol	369	10	—N/a		did not advance	

== Synchronized swimming ==
Colombia had originally qualified a full team of nine athletes, but elected to only compete with a women's duet. The team spot was reallocated to Peru.

Athlete	Event	Technical Routine		Free Routine (Final)			
Athlete	Event	Points	Rank	Points	Rank	Total Points	Rank
Estefanía Álvarez; Mónica Arango	Women's duet	80.1780	5	81.6333	5	161.8113	5

== Table tennis ==
Colombia qualified a women's team.

Women

Athlete	Event	Group Stage				Round of 32	Round of 16	Quarterfinals	Semifinals	Final / BM	
Athlete	Event	Opposition Result	Opposition Result	Opposition Result	Rank	Opposition Result	Opposition Result	Opposition Result	Opposition Result	Opposition Result	Rank
	Singles										
	Team					—N/a					

== Taekwondo ==
Colombia qualified a full team of eight athletes (four men and four women).

Men

Athlete	Event	Preliminaries	Quarterfinals	Semifinals	Repechage	Final / BM	
Athlete	Event	Opposition Result	Opposition Result	Opposition Result	Opposition Result	Opposition Result	Rank
Harold Avella	–58 kg	Oblitas (PER); W 16–15	Navarro (MEX); L 1–20	Did not advance	Fernandez (PAR); W DSQ	Maduro (ARU); W 3–1	3rd place, bronze medalist(s)
Miguel Trejos	–68 kg	Alexander (TRI); W 11–5	Gutiérrez (MEX); L 2–4	Did not advance	—N/a	Jennings (USA); W 16–6	3rd place, bronze medalist(s)
Neyder Lozano	–80 kg	Hernández (DOM); L 4–9	did not advance		Iliesco (CAN); L 5–8	Did not advance	=5
Moises Molinares	+80 kg	Rivas (VEN); L 1–14	did not advance		Bergeron (CAN); L 2–9	Did not advance	=5

Women

Athlete	Event	Round of 16	Quarterfinals	Semifinals	Repechage	Final / BM	
Athlete	Event	Opposition Result	Opposition Result	Opposition Result	Opposition Result	Opposition Result	Rank
Ibeth Rodriguez	–49 kg	Diez (PER); W 8–1	Yong (CAN); L 5–12	did not advance			
Doris Patiño	–57 kg	Martinez (VEN); W 13–12	De Oliveira (BRA); W 4–0	Lewis (USA); L 2–8	Bye	Proffen (ARG); W 2–1	3rd place, bronze medalist(s)
Katherine Dumar	–67 kg	Carvallo (ECU); W 3–2	Alvarado (CRC); L 2–8	did not advance			
Jessica Bravo	+67 kg	Bye	Weekes (PUR); W 11–3	Espinoza (MEX); L 4–5	—N/a	Ferran (CUB); W 9–3	3rd place, bronze medalist(s)

== Tennis ==
Colombia qualified a team of six athletes (three men and two women).

Singles

Athlete	Event	1st round	Round of 32	Round of 16	Quarterfinals	Semifinals	Final / BM	
Athlete	Event	Opposition Score	Opposition Score	Opposition Score	Opposition Score	Opposition Score	Opposition Score	Rank
Nicolás Barrientos	Men's	Bye	Saborío (CRC); W 4–6, 6–2, 6–2	Dellien (BOL); W 6–1, 3–6, 6–1	Podlipnik (CHI); W 7–5, 6–2	Anreozzi (ARG); W 7–6^{10–8}, 7–5	Bagnis (ARG); L 1–6, 2–6	2nd place, silver medalist(s)
Eduardo Struvay	Men's	Bye	James (GRN); W 7– 5, 6–2	Schnur (CAN); L 4–6, 6–7^{0–7}	did not advance			
Carlos Salamanca	Men's	Banzer (BOL); L 6–3, 3–6, 2–6	did not advance					
Mariana Duque	Women's	Bye	Gutiérrez (VEN); W 6–1, 6–2	Zacarías (MEX); W 7–5, 7–6^{7–2}	Dabrowski (CAN); W 6–2, 6–1	Davis (USA); W 6–1, 2–6, 6–3	Rodríguez (MEX); W 6–4, 6–4	1st place, gold medalist(s)
María Fernanda Herazo	Women's	Bye	González (PAR); L 3–6, 7 – 6^{7–5}, 3–6	did not advance				

Doubles

Athlete	Event	Round of 16	Quarterfinals	Semifinals	Final / BM	
Athlete	Event	Opposition Score	Opposition Score	Opposition Score	Opposition Score	Rank
Nicolás Barrientos; Carlos Salamanca	Men's	Escobar / Gómez (ECU); L 4–6, 1–6	did not advance			
Mariana Duque; Eduardo Struvay	Mixed	Bye	Menezes / Cé (BRA); W 6–2, 6–2	Bester / Dabrowski (CAN); L 6–4, 0–6, [3–10]	Royg / Galeano (PAR); L 3–6, 5–7	4

== Triathlon ==
Colombia qualified one male triathlete.

Men

Athlete	Event	Swim (1.5 km)	Trans 1	Bike (40 km)	Trans 2	Run (10 km)	Total	Rank
Carlos Quinchara	Individual	18:53	0:25	58:19	0:21	32:04	1:50:04	13

== Volleyball ==
Colombia qualified a men's team of 12 athletes.

=== Men's tournament ===
Pos	Team	Pld	W	L	Pts	SPW	SPL	SPR	SW	SL	SR
1	Brazil	3	2	1	12	258	220	1.173	8	3	2.667
2	Argentina	3	2	1	9	243	205	1.185	6	4	1.500
3	Cuba	3	2	1	9	255	255	1.000	7	5	1.400
4	Colombia	3	0	3	0	149	225	0.662	0	9	0.000

Source: Archived 2016-03-04 at the Wayback Machine

17 July 2015; 13:35	Brazil	3–0	Colombia	Exhibition Centre, Toronto; Attendance: 2,000
17 July 2015; 13:35	(25–16, 25–13, 25–16) result statistics			Exhibition Centre, Toronto; Attendance: 2,000

19 July 2015; 18:38	Argentina	3–0	Colombia	Exhibition Centre, Toronto; Attendance: 4,200
19 July 2015; 18:38	(25–14, 25–16, 25–21) result statistics			Exhibition Centre, Toronto; Attendance: 4,200

21 July 2015; 22:01	Cuba	3–0	Colombia	Exhibition Centre, Toronto; Attendance: 900
21 July 2015; 22:01	(25–16, 25–19, 25–18) result statistics			Exhibition Centre, Toronto; Attendance: 900

Seventh place match

24 July 2015; 13:35	Colombia	0–3	Mexico	Exhibition Centre, Toronto; Attendance: 3,500
24 July 2015; 13:35	(20–25, 17–25, 18–25) result statistics			Exhibition Centre, Toronto; Attendance: 3,500

2015 Pan American Games 8th place

Colombia

== Water skiing ==
Colombia qualified a full team (four in water skiing, one in wakeboard).

Waterski and Wakeboard

Athlete	Event	Preliminary	Rank	Final	Rank
Mateo Bottero	Men's jump	49.0	8 Q	49.3	6
Mateo Bottero	Men's slalom	3.00/58/12.00	14	did not advance	
Mateo Bottero	Men's tricks	4150	10	did not advance	
Santiago Correa	Men's jump	52.0	7 Q	47.1	7
Santiago Correa	Men's slalom	3.50/58/11.25	=4 Q	5.00/58/11.25	4
Santiago Correa	Men's tricks	2670	11	did not advance	
José Mesa	Men's slalom	3.00/58/11.25	=6 Q	2.50/58/11.25	7
Juan Vélez	Men's wakeboard	36.24	7 Q	63.79	4
Paula Jaramillo	Women's jump	32.6	7	did not advance	
Paula Jaramillo	Women's slalom	3.00/55/13.00	9	did not advance	
Paula Jaramillo	Women's tricks	4910	7	did not advance	

== Weightlifting ==
Colombia qualified a full team of 13 athletes (7 men and 6 women). All 13 members of Colombia's weightlifting team won a medal.

Men

Athlete	Event	Snatch		Clean & Jerk		Total	Rank
Athlete	Event	Result	Rank	Result	Rank	Total	Rank
Carlos Berna	56 kg	116	2	149	2	265	2nd place, silver medalist(s)
Habib de las Salas	56 kg	117	1	152 PR	1	269	1st place, gold medalist(s)
Óscar Figueroa	62 kg	135	2	175	1	310	1st place, gold medalist(s)
Francisco Mosquera	62 kg	135	1	170	2	305	2nd place, silver medalist(s)
Luis Javier Mosquera	69 kg	150 PR	1	181 PR	1	331	1st place, gold medalist(s)
Jhor Moreno	77 kg	146	3	182	3	328	3rd place, bronze medalist(s)
Juan Ruiz Morelos	85 kg	157	4	190	3	347	3rd place, bronze medalist(s)

Women

Athlete	Event	Snatch		Clean & Jerk		Total	Rank
Athlete	Event	Result	Rank	Result	Rank	Total	Rank
Ana Segura	48 kg	77	4	103 PR	1	180	2nd place, silver medalist(s)
Rusmeris Villar	53 kg	86	2	115 PR	1	201	1st place, gold medalist(s)
Lina Rivas	58 kg	97	1	113	1	215	1st place, gold medalist(s)
Mercedes Pérez	63 kg	103	1	132	1	235	1st place, gold medalist(s)
Leydi Solís	69 kg	111 PR	1	145 PR	1	256	1st place, gold medalist(s)
Ubaldina Valoyes	75 kg	112	1	135	1	247	1st place, gold medalist(s)

== See also ==
- Colombia at the 2016 Summer Olympics
