= Roller sports at the 2015 Pan American Games – Men's 500 metres =

Men's 500 metres in roller sports at the 2015 Pan American Games
- Venue: St. John Paul II Catholic Secondary School
- Dates: July 13
- Competitors: 12 from 12 nations

Medalists
Gold medal	Pedro Causil	Colombia
Silver medal	Ezequiel Capellano	Argentina
Bronze medal	Jorge Martínez	Mexico

The men's speed skating 500 metres competition in roller sports at the 2015 Pan American Games was held on July 13 at the St. John Paul II Catholic Secondary School in Toronto.

== Schedule ==
All times are Central Standard Time (UTC-6).

Date	Time	Round
July 13, 2015	9:56	Semifinals
July 13, 2015	10:41	Final

== Results ==
12 athletes from 12 countries competed.

Semifinal - Heat 1

Rank	Name	Nation	Time	Notes
1	Jhoan Guzmán	Venezuela	38.948	Q
2	Ezequiel Capellano	Argentina	39.025	Q
3	Emanuelle Silva	Chile	39.045	
4	Mauricio García	Dominican Republic	39.358	
5	Carlos Montoya Arce	Costa Rica	39.635	
6	Christopher Fiola	Canada	39.926	

Semifinal - Heat 2

Rank	Name	Nation	Time	Notes
1	Pedro Causil	Colombia	39.955	Q
2	Jorge Martínez	Mexico	40.025	Q
3	Jarrett Paul	United States	40.134	
4	Javier Sepulveda Toro	Puerto Rico	40.224	
5	Eduardo Mollinedo Oliva	Guatemala	40.518	
6	Odir Miranda	El Salvador	41.197	

Final

Rank	Name	Nation	Time	Notes
1st place, gold medalist(s)	Pedro Causil	Colombia	40.650	
2nd place, silver medalist(s)	Ezequiel Capellano	Argentina	40.909	
3rd place, bronze medalist(s)	Jorge Martínez	Mexico	41.146	
4	Jhoan Guzmán	Venezuela	41.313	
