= Roller sports at the 2015 Pan American Games – Women's 200 metres time-trial =

Women's 200 metres time trial in roller sports at the 2015 Pan American Games
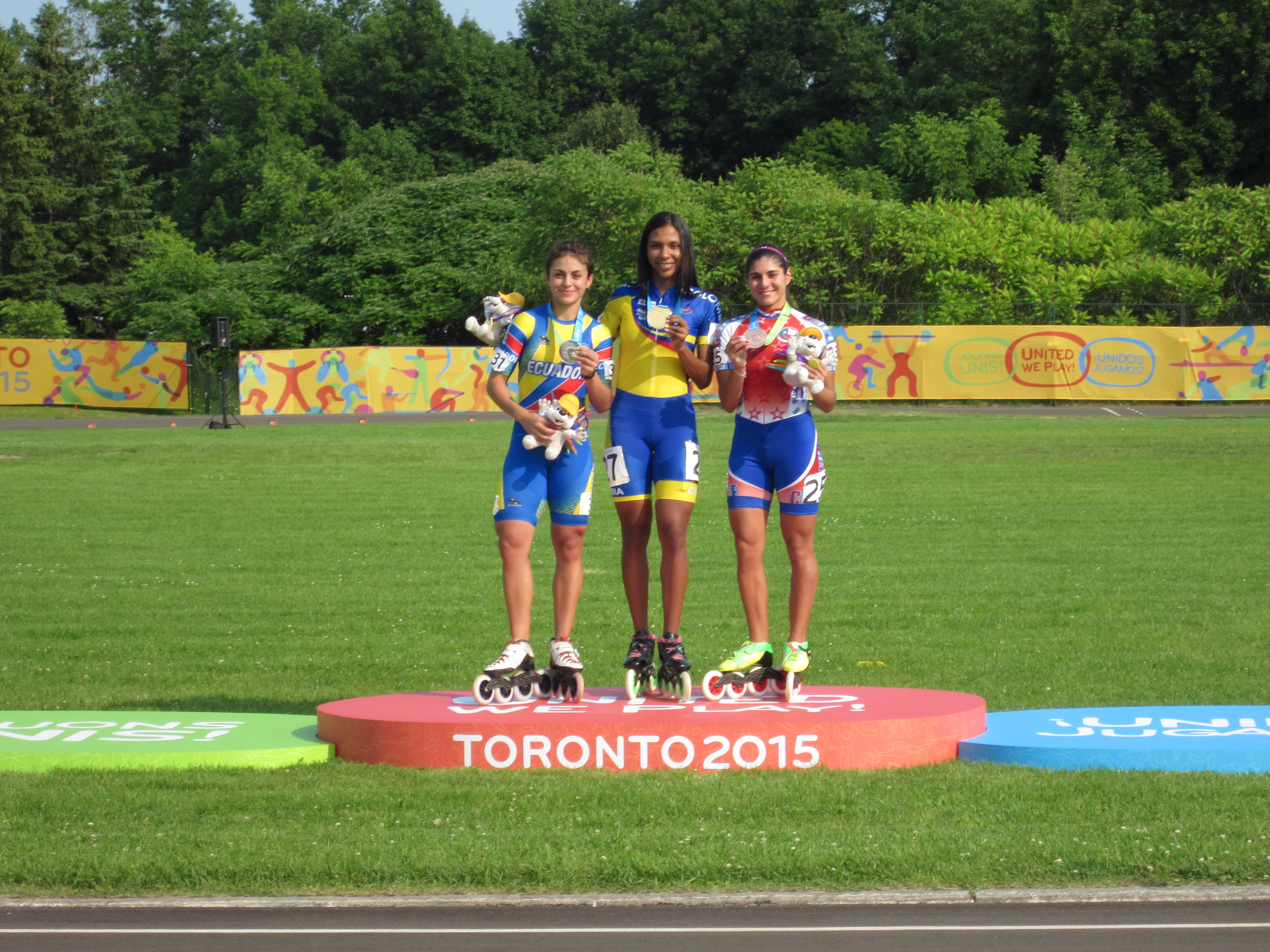
- 2015 Pan American Games Speed Skating Women's 200 metres time-trial medalists
- Venue: St. John Paul II Catholic Secondary School
- Dates: July 12
- Competitors: 12 from 12 nations

Medalists
Gold medal	Hellen Montoya	Colombia
Silver medal	Ingrid Factos	Ecuador
Bronze medal	María José Moya	Chile

The women's speed skating 200 metres time trial in roller sports at the 2015 Pan American Games was held on July 12 at the St. John Paul II Catholic Secondary School in Toronto.

== Schedule ==
All times are Central Standard Time (UTC-6).

Date	Time	Round
July 12, 2015	16:05	Final

== Results ==
12 athletes from 12 countries competed.

Rank	Name	Nation	Time
1st place, gold medalist(s)	Hellen Montoya	Colombia	17.653
2nd place, silver medalist(s)	Ingrid Factos	Ecuador	17.994
3rd place, bronze medalist(s)	María José Moya	Chile	18.042
4	Rocio Berbel	Argentina	18.315
5	Erin Jackson	United States	18.479
6	Yarubi Bandres	Venezuela	18.500
7	Veronica Elias	Mexico	18.588
8	Dalia Soberanis	Guatemala	18.911
9	Jennifer Monterrey	Costa Rica	19.848
10	Judith Lopez	El Salvador	20.325
11	Morgane Echardour	Canada	20.993
