= Weightlifting at the 2015 Pan American Games – Men's 69 kg =

Weightlifting – Men's 69 kg at the 2015 Pan American Games
- Venue: Oshawa Sports Centre
- Dates: July 12
- Competitors: 13 from 10 nations

Medalists
Gold medal	Luis Javier Mosquera	Colombia
Silver medal	Bredni Roque	Mexico
Bronze medal	Francis Luna-Grenier	Canada

The men's 69 kg competition of the weightlifting events at the 2015 Pan American Games in Toronto, Canada, was held on July 12 at the Oshawa Sports Centre. The defending champion was Israel Rubio from Venezuela.

Each lifter performed in both the snatch and clean and jerk lifts, with the final score being the sum of the lifter's best result in each. The athlete received three attempts in each of the two lifts; the score for the lift was the heaviest weight successfully lifted.

== Schedule ==
All times are Eastern Daylight Time (UTC-4).

Date	Time	Round
July 12, 2015	16:30	Final

== Results ==
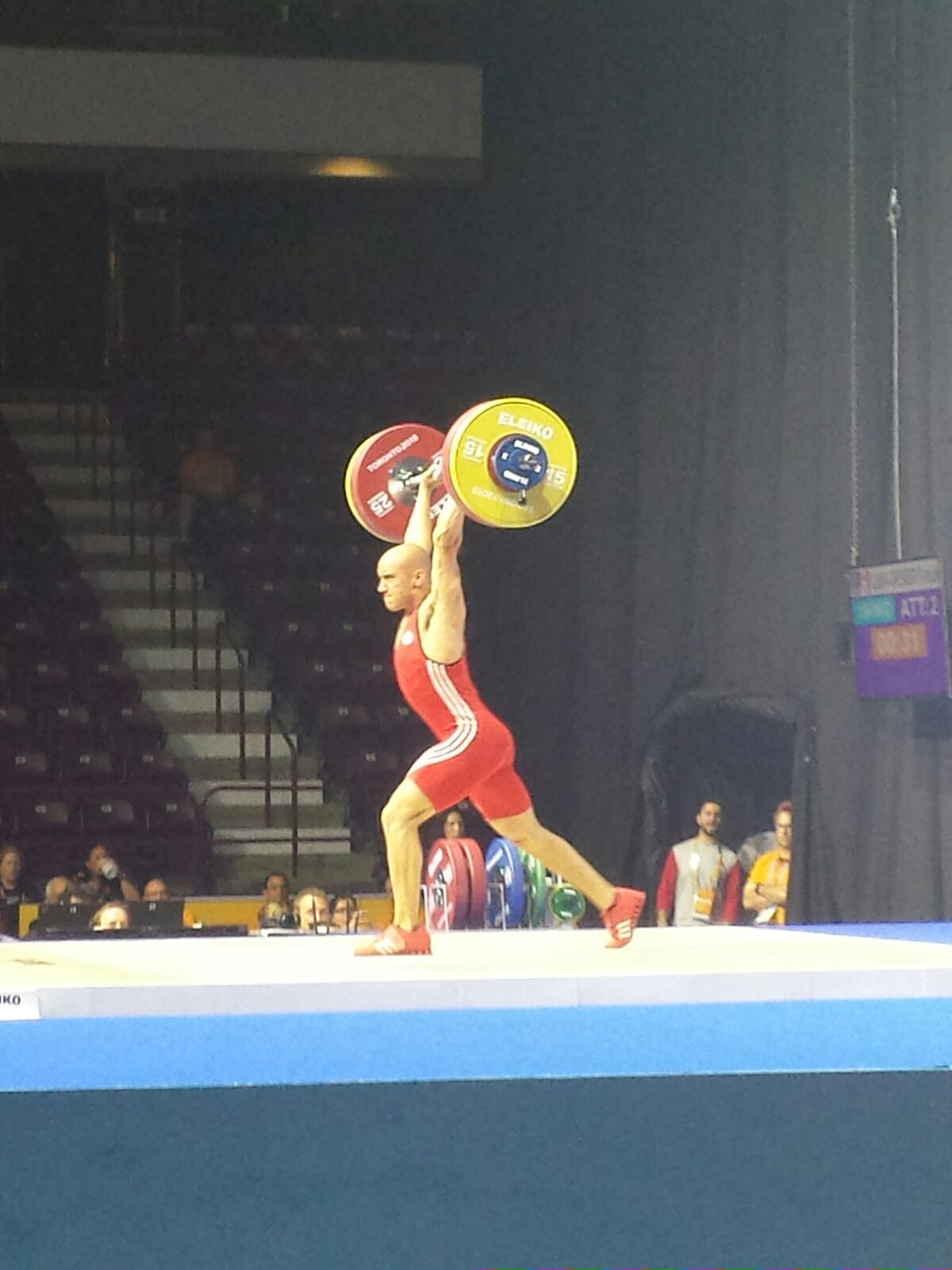
Francis Luna-Grenier lifts during the men's 69kg weightlifting competition at the 2015 Pan American Games in Toronto.

13 athletes from ten countries took part.

- PR – Pan American Games record

Rank	Name	Country	Group	B.weight (kg)	Snatch (kg)	Clean & Jerk (kg)	Total (kg)
1st place, gold medalist(s)	Luis Javier Mosquera	Colombia	A	68.41	150 PR	181 PR	331 PR
2nd place, silver medalist(s)	Bredni Roque	Mexico	A	68.14	137	180	317
3rd place, bronze medalist(s)	Francis Luna-Grenier	Canada	A	68.86	132	167	299
4	Jonathan Muñoz	Mexico	A	68.45	131	166	297
5	Israel José Rubio	Venezuela	A	68.42	135	160	295
6	Edwar Vasquez	Venezuela	A	68.99	130	165	295
7	Gabriel de la Cruz	Dominican Republic	A	68.75	130	163	293
8	Oscar Valdizon	Guatemala	A	68.73	125	157	282
9	Oscar Terrones	Peru	A	67.71	120	150	270
10	Ariel Batista	Panama	A	68.20	120	145	265
11	Junior Lahuanampa	Peru	A	67.91	110	150	260
12	Neyer Saldias	Bolivia	A	65.33	112	125	237
	Alex Lee	United States	A	68.51			DNF

== New records ==
The following records were established and improved upon during the competition.

Snatch	150.0 kg	Luis Javier Mosquera (COL)	PR
Clean & Jerk	181.0 kg	Luis Javier Mosquera (COL)	PR
Total	331.0 kg	Luis Javier Mosquera (COL)	PR
