= Giselle Soler =

Argentinian artistic roller skater (boprn 1997)

Personal information
- Nationality: Argentinian
- Born: 4 May 1997 (age 29)

Sport
- Sport: Roller skating
Medal record
Pan American Games
Gold medal – first place	2015 Toronto	Free skating
Silver medal – second place	2019 Lima	Free skating

Giselle Soler (born 4 May 1997) is an Argentinian artistic roller skater.

Soler competed at the Pan American Games in 2015, where she won a gold medal in the free skating event, and in 2019, where she won a silver medal in the same event.
