= Roller sports at the 2015 Pan American Games – Women's free skating =

Women's figure skating in roller sports at the 2015 Pan American Games
- Venue: Exhibition Centre
- Dates: July 11–12
- Competitors: 8 from 8 nations
- Winning score: 519.70

Medalists
Gold medal	Giselle Soler	Argentina
Silver medal	Talitha Haas	Brazil
Bronze medal	Marisol Villarroel	Chile

The women's figure skating free program in roller sports at the 2015 Pan American Games was held between July 11–12 at the Direct Energy Centre (Exhibition Centre), in Toronto. Due to naming rights the venue will be known as the latter for the duration of the games. The defending Pan American Games champion is Elizabeth Soler of Argentina.

== Schedule ==
All times are Central Standard Time (UTC-6).

Date	Time	Round
July 11, 2015	18:20	Short program
July 12, 2015	18:05	Long program

== Results ==
8 athletes from 8 countries competed.

Rank	Name	Nation	Total points	SP	LP
1st place, gold medalist(s)	Giselle Soler	Argentina	519.70	1	1
2nd place, silver medalist(s)	Talitha Haas	Brazil	498.30	2	2
3rd place, bronze medalist(s)	Marisol Villarroel	Chile	479.70	3	3
4	Kailah Macri	Canada	470.80	4	4
5	Nataly Otalora	Colombia	464.00	6	5
6	Courtney Donovan	United States	447.70	5	6
7	Alejandra Hernandez	Mexico	419.60	7	8
8	Eduarda Fuentes	Ecuador	418.50	8	7
