= Weightlifting at the 2015 Pan American Games – Women's 58 kg =

Weightlifting – Women's 58 kg at the 2015 Pan American Games
- Venue: Oshawa Sports Centre
- Dates: July 12
- Competitors: 6 from 6 nations

Medalists
Gold medal	Lina Rivas	Colombia
Silver medal	Yusleidy Figueroa	Venezuela
Bronze medal	Quisia Guicho	Mexico

The women's 58 kg competition of the weightlifting events at the 2015 Pan American Games in Toronto, Canada, was held on July 12 at the Oshawa Sports Centre. The defending champion was Maria Escobar from Ecuador.

Each lifter performed in both the snatch and clean and jerk lifts, with the final score being the sum of the lifter's best result in each. The athlete received three attempts in each of the two lifts; the score for the lift was the heaviest weight successfully lifted.

== Schedule ==
All times are Eastern Daylight Time (UTC-4).

Date	Time	Round
July 12, 2015	19:00	Final

== Results ==
6 athletes from six countries took part.

Rank	Name	Country	Group	B.weight (kg)	Snatch (kg)	Clean & Jerk (kg)	Total (kg)
1st place, gold medalist(s)	Lina Rivas	Colombia	A	57.91	97	118	215
2nd place, silver medalist(s)	Yusleidy Figueroa	Venezuela	A	57.69	93	116	209
3rd place, bronze medalist(s)	Quisia Guicho	Mexico	A	57.85	85	118	203
4	Tessy Sandi	Peru	A	56.84	80	103	183
	Yineisy Reyes	Dominican Republic	A	57.33	92		DNF
	Maria Escobar	Ecuador	A	57.44			DNF
