= El Salvador at the 2015 Pan American Games =

- IOC code: ESA
- NOC: El Salvador Olympic Committee

in Toronto 10–26 July 2015
- Competitors: 52 in 21 sports
- Flag bearer (opening): Marcelo Acosta
- Flag bearer (closing): Jorge Merino
- Medals Ranked 20th: Gold 0 Silver 1 Bronze 2 Total 3

Pan American Games appearances (overview)
- 1951; 1955; 1959; 1963; 1967; 1971; 1975; 1979; 1983; 1987; 1991; 1995; 1999; 2003; 2007; 2011; 2015; 2019; 2023; 2027

El Salvador competed in the 2015 Pan American Games in Toronto, Ontario, Canada from July 10 to 26, 2015.

On July 2, 2015 swimmer Marcelo Acosta was named the flagbearer of the team during the opening ceremony.

== Competitors ==
The following table lists El Salvador's delegation per sport and gender.

Sport	Men	Women	Total
Archery	1	1	2
Athletics	1	1	2
Badminton	1	1	2
Beach volleyball	2	2	4
Bowling	2	2	4
Boxing	0	1	1
Cycling	0	2	2
Equestrian	1	1	2
Fencing	0	3	3
Gymnastics	1	0	1
Judo	3	0	3
Karate	1	0	1
Roller sports	1	1	2
Rowing	1	3	4
Sailing	1	0	1
Shooting	6	3	9
Swimming	2	2	4
Taekwondo	0	1	1
Tennis	1	0	1
Weightlifting	1	1	2
Wrestling	1	0	1
Total	27	25	52

== Medalists ==
The following competitors from El Salvador won medals at the games. In the by discipline sections below, medalists' names are bolded.

Medal	Name	Sport	Event	Date
Silver	Jorge Merino	Karate	Men's 84 kg	July 25
Bronze	Lilian Castro	Shooting	Women's 10 metre air pistol	July 12
Bronze	Evelyn García	Cycling	Women's road time trial	July 22

**Medals by sport**
**Sport**	1st place, gold medalist(s)	2nd place, silver medalist(s)	3rd place, bronze medalist(s)	**Total**
Karate	0	1	0	1
Cycling	0	0	1	1
Shooting	0	0	1	1
**Total**	**0**	**1**	**2**	**3**

**Medals by day**
**Day**	1st place, gold medalist(s)	2nd place, silver medalist(s)	3rd place, bronze medalist(s)	**Total**
July 12	0	0	1	1
July 22	0	0	1	1
July 25	0	1	0	1
**Total**	**0**	**1**	**2**	**3**

== Archery ==
One male and one female archer from El Salvador qualified for the archery event at the Games.

Athlete	Event	Ranking Round		Round of 32	Round of 16	Quarterfinals	Semifinals	Final / BM	Rank
Athlete	Event	Score	Seed	Opposition Score	Opposition Score	Opposition Score	Opposition Score	Opposition Score	Rank
Oscar Guillén	Men's individual	618	28	Álvarez (MEX); **L** 0–6	Did not advance				
Elena Abullarade	Women's individual	563	30	Lorig (USA); **L** 2–6	Did not advance				

== Athletics ==
El Salvador qualified one male and one female athlete.

Road and track events

Athlete	Event	Final	
Athlete	Event	Result	Rank
Luis Lopez	Men's 20 km walk	1:42:03	10
Cristina López	Women's 20 km walk	1:47:33	13

== Badminton ==
El Salvador qualified a team of two athletes (one man and one woman).

Athlete	Event	First round	Round of 32	Round of 16	Quarterfinals	Semifinals	Final	Rank
Athlete	Event	Opposition Result	Opposition Result	Opposition Result	Opposition Result	Opposition Result	Opposition Result	Rank
Jassiel Hernandez	Men's singles	Bye	Muňoz (MEX); **L** (5–21, 6–21)	Did not advance				
Fatima Fuentes	Women's singles	Bye	Bernatene (ARG); **W** (21–15, 21–13)	Li (CAN); **L** (4–21, 10–21)	Did not advance			
Jassiel Hernandez; Fatima Fuentes	Mixed doubles	—N/a	Martinez / Oropeza (CUB); **L** (11–21, 6–21)	Did not advance				

== Beach volleyball ==
El Salvador qualified a men's and women's pair for a total of four athletes.

Athlete	Event	Preliminary round			Quarterfinals	9th to 12th round	13th to 16th round	13th-place match	11th-place match	Final
Athlete	Event	Opposition Score	Opposition Score	Opposition Score	Opposition Score	Opposition Score	Opposition Score	Opposition Score	Opposition Score	Rank
Carlos Talavera; David Vargas	Men's	Grimalt / Grimalt (CHI); **L** (11-21, 12-21)	Haddock / Rodriguez (PUR); **L** (15-21, 15-21)	Whitfield / Williams (TTO); **L** (15-21, 24-26)	—N/a	—N/a	Garcia Betancourt / Recinos Ocaña (GUA); **W** (18-21, 21-14, 21-19)	Bissette / Clercent (LCA); **W** (22-20, 17-21, 15-10)	—N/a	13
Laura Molina; Ivonne Soler	Women's	Larsen / Metter (USA); **L** (12-21, 14-21)	Galindo / Galindo (COL); **L** (18-21, 12-21)	Orellana / Recinos (GUA); **W** (21-18, 23-21, 15-12)	Gomez / Nieto (URU); **L** (12-21, 16-21)	Mardones / Rivas (CHI); **L** (15-21, 21-19, 15-8)	—N/a	—N/a	Bernier Colon / Torruella (PUR); **W** (23-25, 21-19, 16-14)	11

== Bowling ==
El Salvador qualified a full team of four athletes (two men and two women).

Singles

Athlete	Event	Qualification															Round Robin				Semifinals		Finals
Athlete	Event	Block 1 (games 1–6)						Block 2 (games 7–12)						Total	Average	Rank	Total	Average	Grand total	Rank	Semifinals		Finals
Athlete	Event	1	2	3	4	5	6	7	8	9	10	11	12	Total	Average	Rank	Total	Average	Grand total	Rank	Opposition Result	Opposition Result	Rank
Julio Acosta	Men's	176	193	158	195	211	194	167	236	187	182	158	216	2273	189.4	23	Did not advance						23
Giancarlo Mateucci	Men's	239	200	222	236	204	179	180	194	165	166	157	169	2311	192.6	19	Did not advance						19
Eugenia Quintanilla	Women's	220	176	246	159	191	178	161	168	166	166	223	232	2286	190.5	21	Did not advance						21
Marcela Sanchez	Women's	138	199	185	161	164	229	237	269	207	222	168	233	2412	201.0	11	Did not advance						11

Doubles

Athlete	Event	Block 1 (games 1–6)								Block 2 (games 7–12)								Grand total	Final rank
Athlete	Event	1	2	3	4	5	6	Total	Average	7	8	9	10	11	12	Total	Average	Grand total	Final rank
Julio Acosta; Giancarlo Mateucci	Men's	173	157	163	213	178	196	1080	180.0	207	170	232	176	180	217	2262	188.5	4729	10
Julio Acosta; Giancarlo Mateucci	Men's	244	191	218	213	228	170	1264	210.7	201	165	183	202	208	244	2467	205.6	4729	10
Eugenia Quintanilla; Marcela Sanchez	Women's	197	180	182	198	181	202	1140	190.0	236	188	256	189	208	209	2426	202.2	4779	6
Eugenia Quintanilla; Marcela Sanchez	Women's	187	191	188	161	225	170	1122	187.0	152	190	215	191	187	296	2353	196.1	4779	6

== Boxing ==
El Salvador qualified one female boxer.

Woman

Athlete	Event	Quarterfinals	Semifinals	Final
Athlete	Event	Opposition Result	Opposition Result	Opposition Result
Karla Herrera	Light welterweight	Mirquin Sena (DOM); **L** 1–2	Did not advance	

== Cycling ==
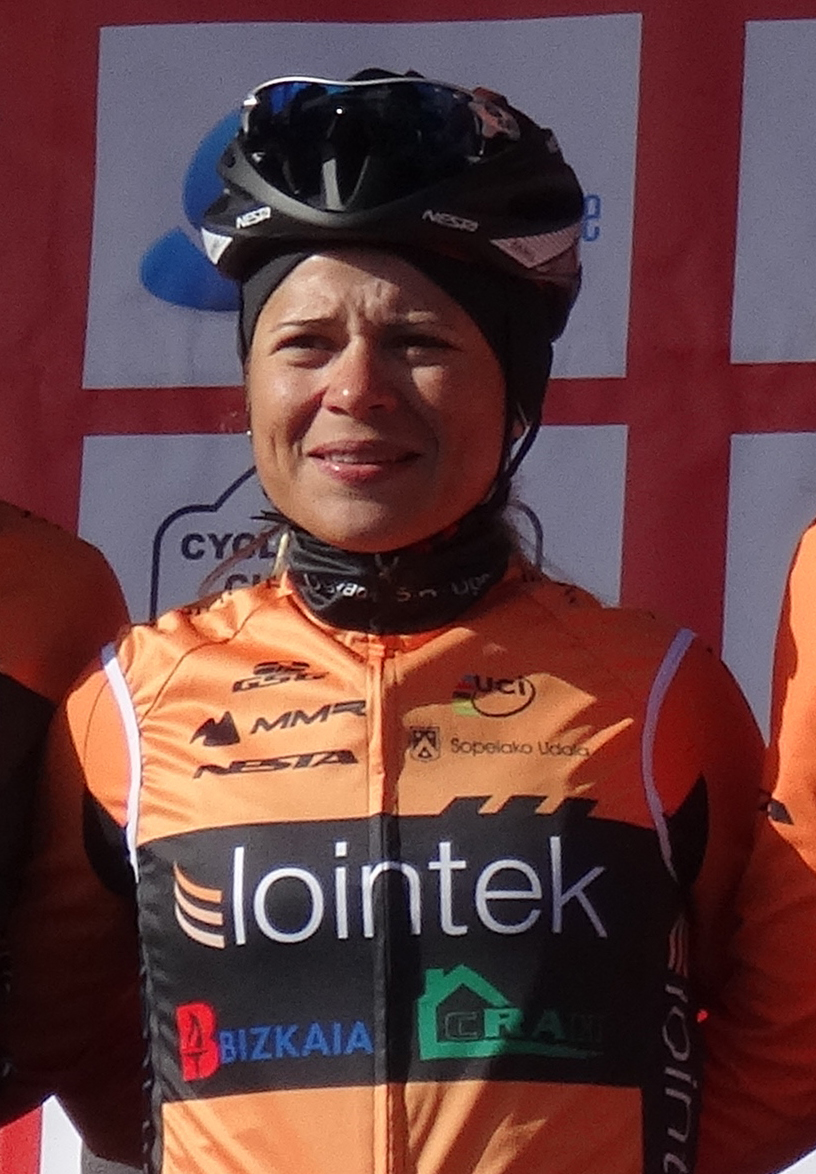
Cyclist Evelyn García won a bronze medal in the women's individual road time trial

El Salvador qualified two female cyclists (one each for road and track events).

=== Road ===
Women

Athlete	Event	Time	Rank
**Evelyn García**	Road race	2:07:53	18
**Evelyn García**	Time trial	27:20.24	3rd place, bronze medalist(s)

=== Track ===
Keirin

Athlete	Event	1st round	Final
Athlete	Event	Rank	Rank
Karen Cruz	Women's keirin	3 **Q**	4

Sprint

Athlete	Event	Qualification		Round 1	Repechage 1	Quarterfinals	Semifinals	Final	
Athlete	Event	Time Speed (km/h)	Rank	Opposition	Opposition	Opposition	Opposition	Opposition	Rank
Karen Cruz	11.887	9 **Q**	Lisandra Guerra (CUB); **L**	2	Did not advance				

== Equestrian ==
El Salvador qualified two athletes in the eventing competition.

=== Eventing ===
Athlete	Horse	Event	Dressage		Cross-country		Jumping		Total	
Athlete	Horse	Event	Dressage		Cross-country		Final		Total	
Athlete	Horse	Event	Penalties	Rank	Penalties	Rank	Penalties	Rank	Penalties	Rank
Sofia Baussan Augspuer	Durango	Individual	61.60	=26	12.40	21	19.00	=30	93.00	24
Jose Romano Hijo	Bucefalo	Individual	67.40	=38	Eliminated					

== Fencing ==
El Salvador qualified 3 fencers (3 women).

Athlete	Event	Pool Round		Round of 16	Quarterfinals	Semifinals	Final / BM	
Athlete	Event	Result	Seed	Opposition Score	Opposition Score	Opposition Score	Opposition Score	Rank
Fatima Tobar	Women's Sabre	1	13	Mariel Zagunis (USA); **L** 2–15	Did not advance			
Alba Marroquin Castañeda	Women's Sabre	1	16	Paola Pliego (MEX); **L** 8–15	Did not advance			
Madeline Hernandez Elias; Alba Marroquin Castañeda; Fatima Tobar	Women's Sabre Team	—N/a			United States; **L** 25–45	Did not advance		8

== Gymnastics ==
El Salvador qualified one male gymnast. Pablo Velasquez originally was the first reserve after qualification but later competed in the final.

Artistic
Men
Individual Qualification

Athlete	Event	Qualification								Final							
Athlete	Event	Apparatus						Total	Rank	Apparatus						Total	Rank
Athlete	Event	F	PH	R	V	PB	HB	Total	Rank	F	PH	R	V	PB	HB	Total	Rank
Pablo Velasquez	Qualification	12.200	12.300	12.300	12.900	11.350	10.850	71.900	28 **R**	12.400	12.150	11.400	13.850	11.150	10.950	71.900	20

Qualification Legend: Q = Qualified to apparatus final

== Judo ==
El Salvador qualified a team of four judokas (three men and one woman). However, they did not register the female athlete for the competition.

Men

Athlete	Event	Round of 16	Quarterfinals	Semifinals	Repechage	Final / BM	
Athlete	Event	Opposition Result	Opposition Result	Opposition Result	Opposition Result	Opposition Result	Rank
Gustavo Lopez Aguilera	−66 kg	—N/a	Charles Chibana (BRA); **L** 000–100	—N/a	Wander Mateo (DOM); **L** 000–100	Did not advance	7
Juan Rosa	−73 kg	—N/a	Alex William Pombo Silva (BRA); **L** 000–100	—N/a	Fernando Ibañez (ECU); **L** 000S3–001S2	Did not advance	7
Juan Diego Turcios	−81 kg	Pedro Castro (COL); **L** 001S3–000S2	Did not advance				

== Karate ==
El Salvador qualified 1 athlete. Jorge Merino had the country's highest placement, a silver medal finish.

Athlete	Event	Round Robin				Semifinals	Final	
Athlete	Event	Opposition Result	Opposition Result	Opposition Result	Rank	Opposition Result	Opposition Result	Rank
**Jorge Merino**	Men's –84 kg	Cesar Herrera (VEN); **L** 0–1	Sarmen Sinani (CAN); **W** 6–1	Jorge Acevedo (CHI); **W** 3–1	2	Andres Loor (ECU); **W** 2–0	Miguel Amargós (ARG); **L** 1–3	2nd place, silver medalist(s)

== Roller sports ==
El Salvador qualified one male and one female roller skater.

Speed

Athlete	Event	Semifinal		Final	
Athlete	Event	Time	Rank	Time/Points	Rank
Odir Miranda	Men's 200 m time trial	—N/a		17.738	10
Odir Miranda	Men's 500 m	41.197	6	Did not advance	
Odir Miranda	Men's 10,000 m points race	—N/a		Did not finish	
Judith Lopez	Women's 200 m time trial	—N/a		20.325	10
Judith Lopez	Women's 10,000 m points race	—N/a		Did not finish	

== Rowing ==
El Salvador qualified 3 boats and four athletes (one male and three female).

Athlete	Event	Heats		Repechage		Final	
Athlete	Event	Time	Rank	Time	Rank	Time	Rank
Gerson Hernandez	Men's Single Sculls	7.37.47	5 **R**	7.47.06	4 **FB**	8:32.26	10
Jessica Hernandez	Women's Single Sculls	8:28.06	4 **R**	9:04.26	5 **FB**	8:08.68	7
Adriana Escobar; Karla Calvo	Women's Lwt Double Sculls	7:57.81	3 **R**	8:00.97	5 **FB**	7:23.83	8

Qualification Legend: FA=Final A (medal); FB=Final B (non-medal); R=Repechage

== Sailing ==
El Salvador qualified one sailor.

Athlete	Event	Race													Net Points	Final Rank
Athlete	Event	1	2	3	4	5	6	7	8	9	10	11	12	M*	Net Points	Final Rank
Enrique Arathoon	Laser	8	5	9	(13)	7	9	13	12	11	9	11	11	—N/a	105	11

== Shooting ==
El Salvador qualified 9 shooters (six male and three female).

Men

Athlete	Event	Qualification		Semifinal		Final	
Athlete	Event	Points	Rank	Points	Rank	Points	Rank
Andres Amador	Skeet	87	26	Did not advance			
Andres Amador	Trap	Did not start					
Hermes Barahona	25 metre rapid fire pistol	536-11x	14	—N/a		Did not advance	
Hermes Barahona	10 metre air pistol	556-10x	24	—N/a		Did not advance	
Antonio Ferracuti	Skeet	Did not start					
Antonio Ferracuti	Trap	54	29	Did not advance			
Israel Gutierrez	50 metre rifle three positions	1113-29x	19	—N/a		Did not advance	
Israel Gutierrez	50 metre rifle prone	606.4	24	—N/a		Did not advance	
Israel Gutierrez	10 metre air rifle	607.0	14	—N/a		Did not advance	
Jorge Pimentel	50 metre pistol	503-03x	25	—N/a		Did not advance	
Jorge Pimentel	10 metre air pistol	560-15x	19	—N/a		Did not advance	
Oliser Zelaya	50 metre rifle three positions	1118-31x	18	—N/a		Did not advance	
Oliser Zelaya	50 metre rifle prone	599.9	27	—N/a		Did not advance	
Oliser Zelaya	10 metre air rifle	601.9	19	—N/a		Did not advance	

Women

Athlete	Event	Qualification		Semifinal		Final	
Athlete	Event	Points	Rank	Points	Rank	Points	Rank
**Lilian Castro**	25 metre pistol	539-04x	19	Did not advance			
**Lilian Castro**	10 metre air pistol	371-08x	6 **Q**	—N/a		172.0	3rd place, bronze medalist(s)
Johana Pineda	50 metre rifle three positions	565-18x	16	—N/a		Did not advance	
Johana Pineda	10 metre air rifle	401.2	20	—N/a		Did not advance	
Ana Ramirez	50 metre rifle three positions	581-21x	2 **Q**	—N/a		393.2	7
Ana Ramirez	10 metre air rifle	413.3	2 **Q**	—N/a		100.3	7

== Swimming ==
El Salvador qualified four swimmers (two men and two women).

Key

- Note – Ranks given for swimming events are for all heats
- **FB** = Qualified for the B Final
- DNS = Did not start

Men

Athlete	Event	Heat		Final	
Athlete	Event	Time	Rank	Time	Rank
Marcelo Acosta	Men's 100 m freestyle	53.40	21	Did not advance	
Marcelo Acosta	Men's 200 m freestyle	1:51.77	14 **QB**	1:50.95	11
Marcelo Acosta	Men's 400 m freestyle	3:54.83	13 **QB**	3:51.12	9
Marcelo Acosta	Men's 1500 m freestyle	—N/a		15:16.26	4
Rafael Alfaro	Men's 100 m breaststroke	1:05.50	17	Did not advance	
Rafael Alfaro	Men's 200 m breaststroke	2:21.05	18	Did not advance	
Rafael Alfaro	Men's 200 metre individual medley	2:03.89	10 **QB**	2:02.55	9
Rafael Alfaro	Men's 400 metre individual medley	4:29.81	13 **QB**	4:27.40	13
Rebeca Quinteros	Women's 200 m freestyle	2:05.26	13 **QB**	2:06.19	16
Rebeca Quinteros	Women's 400 m freestyle	4:29.19	16 **QB**	4:27.89	15
Rebeca Quinteros	Women's 800 m freestyle	—N/a		9:07.98	14
Fatima Flores Guzman	Women's 10 km open water	—N/a		2:14:15.0	14

== Taekwondo ==
El Salvador received a wildcard to enter one female athlete.

Athlete	Event	Round of 16	Quarterfinals	Semifinals	Repechage	Bronze medal	Final	
Athlete	Event	Opposition Result	Opposition Result	Opposition Result	Opposition Result	Opposition Result	Opposition Result	Rank
Vanessa Vazquez	Women's -57kg	Paulina Armeria (MEX); **L** 2–3	Did not advance		Celina Proffen (ARG); **L** 1–5	Did not advance		7

== Tennis ==
El Salvador qualified one athlete in the men's singles event.

Men

Athlete	Event	First round	Round of 32	Round of 16	Quarterfinals	Semifinals	Final / BM	
Athlete	Event	Opposition Score	Opposition Score	Opposition Score	Opposition Score	Opposition Score	Opposition Score	Rank
Marcelo Arévalo	Singles	Bye	Galeano (PAR); **L** (5–7, 3–6)	Did not advance				

== Weightlifting ==
El Salvador qualified one male and one female weightlifter.

Athlete	Event	Snatch		Clean & jerk		Total	Rank
Athlete	Event	Result	Rank	Result	Rank	Total	Rank
Julio Salamanca	Men's 62 kg	120	4	155	4	275	4
Genesis Murcia	Women's 48 kg	70	9	88	8	158	8

== Wrestling ==
El Salvador received one wildcard.

Men's freestyle

Athlete	Event	Preliminaries	Quarterfinals	Semifinals	Final
Athlete	Event	Opposition Result	Opposition Result	Opposition Result	Opposition Result
Luis Portillo	65 kg	Mendieta (NCA); **W** 10–0	Garcia (CAN); **L** 0–8	Did not advance	

== See also ==
- El Salvador at the 2016 Summer Olympics
