= Weightlifting at the 2015 Pan American Games – Men's 56 kg =

Weightlifting – Men's 56 kg at the 2015 Pan American Games
- Venue: Oshawa Sports Centre
- Dates: July 11
- Competitors: 7 from 6 nations

Medalists
Gold medal	Habib de las Salas	Colombia
Silver medal	Carlos Berna	Colombia
Bronze medal	Luis García	Dominican Republic

The men's 56 kg competition of the weightlifting events at the 2015 Pan American Games in Toronto, Canada, was held on July 11 at the Oshawa Sports Centre. The defending champion was Sergio Álvarez from Cuba.

Each lifter performed in both the snatch and clean and jerk lifts, with the final score being the sum of the lifter's best result in each. The athlete received three attempts in each of the two lifts; the score for the lift was the heaviest weight successfully lifted. This weightlifting event was the lightest men's event at the weightlifting competition, limiting competitors to a maximum of 56 kilograms of body mass.

== Schedule ==
All times are Eastern Daylight Time (UTC-4).

Date	Time	Round
July 11, 2015	14:00	Final

== Results ==
7 athletes from six countries took part.

- PR – Pan American Games record

Rank	Name	Country	Group	B.weight (kg)	Snatch (kg)	Clean & Jerk (kg)	Total (kg)
1st place, gold medalist(s)	Habib de las Salas	Colombia	A	55.90	117	152 PR	269
2nd place, silver medalist(s)	Carlos Berna	Colombia	A	55.98	116	149	265
3rd place, bronze medalist(s)	Luis García	Dominican Republic	A	55.95	115	141	256
4	Enmanuel Rocafuerte	Ecuador	A	55.59	110	135	245
5	Francisco Barrera	Chile	A	55.89	103	130	233
6	Orlando Vasquez	Nicaragua	A	55.89	100	123	223
	Edouard Joseph	Haiti	A	55.69	NM	DNS	DNF

== New record ==
The following record were established and improved upon during the competition.

Clean & Jerk	152.0 kg	Habib de las Salas (COL)	PR
