= Roller sports at the 2015 Pan American Games – Men's free skating =

Men's figure skating in roller sports at the 2015 Pan American Games
- Venue: Exhibition Centre
- Dates: July 11–12
- Competitors: 8 from 8 nations
- Winning score: 536.00

Medalists
Gold medal	Marcel Stürmer	Brazil
Silver medal	John Burchfield	United States
Bronze medal	Diego Duque	Colombia

The men's figure skating free program in roller sports at the 2015 Pan American Games was held between July 11–12 at the Direct Energy Centre (Exhibition Centre), in Toronto. Due to naming rights the venue will be known as the latter for the duration of the games. The defending Pan American Games champion is Marcel Sturmer of Brazil.

== Schedule ==
All times are Central Standard Time (UTC-6).

Date	Time	Round
July 11, 2015	19:06	Short program
July 12, 2015	19:04	Long program

== Results ==
8 athletes from 8 countries competed.

Rank	Name	Nation	Total points	SP	LP
1st place, gold medalist(s)	Marcel Stürmer	Brazil	536.00	1	1
2nd place, silver medalist(s)	John Burchfield	United States	505.00	3	2
3rd place, bronze medalist(s)	Diego Duque	Colombia	496.70	4	3
4	Anibal Frare	Argentina	493.90	2	4
5	Víctor López	Paraguay	466.40	5	5
6	Luís Reyna	Mexico	432.50	7	6
7	Anthony Payamps	Dominican Republic	381.90	8	7
8	Jose Luis Díaz	Chile	116.20	6	DNF
