= Weightlifting at the 2015 Pan American Games – Men's 85 kg =

Weightlifting – Men's 85 kg at the 2015 Pan American Games
- Venue: Oshawa Sports Centre
- Dates: July 13
- Competitors: 6 from 4 nations

Medalists
Gold medal	Yoelmis Hernández	Cuba
Silver medal	Yadier Nuñez	Cuba
Bronze medal	Juan Francisco Ruiz	Colombia

The men's 85 kg competition of the weightlifting events at the 2015 Pan American Games in Toronto, Canada, was held on July 13 at the Oshawa Sports Centre. The defending champion was Yoelmis Hernández from Cuba.

Each lifter performed in both the snatch and clean and jerk lifts, with the final score being the sum of the lifter's best result in each. The athlete received three attempts in each of the two lifts; the score for the lift was the heaviest weight successfully lifted.

== Schedule ==
All times are Eastern Daylight Time (UTC-4).

Date	Time	Round
July 13, 2015	19:00	Final

== Results ==
6 athletes from four countries took part.

- PR – Pan American Games record

Rank	Name	Country	Group	B.weight (kg)	Snatch (kg)	Clean & Jerk (kg)	Total (kg)
1st place, gold medalist(s)	Yoelmis Hernández	Cuba	A	84.48	164 PR	206 PR	370 PR
2nd place, silver medalist(s)	Yadier Nuñez	Cuba	A	83.86	163	201	364
3rd place, bronze medalist(s)	Juan Francisco Ruiz	Colombia	A	84.34	157	190	347
4	Pascal Plamondon	Canada	A	84.70	157	186	343
5	Renson Balza	Venezuela	A	83.96	157	185	342
6	Boady Santavy	Canada	A	84.35	146	176	322

== New records ==
The following records were established and improved upon during the competition.

Snatch	164.0 kg	Yoelmis Hernández (CUB)	PR
Clean & Jerk	206.0 kg	Yoelmis Hernández (CUB)	PR
Total	370.0 kg	Yoelmis Hernández (CUB)	PR
