= Roller sports at the 2015 Pan American Games =

- Roller sports pictogram for the games
- Venues: Exhibition Centre – Hall B (figure); St. John Paul II Catholic Secondary School (speed)
- Dates: July 11–13
- No. of events: 8 (4 men, 4 women)
- Competitors: 55 from 15 nations

Roller sports at the 2015 Pan American Games in Toronto will be held from July 11 to 13.

The speed skating competitions will be held at the St. John Paul II Catholic Secondary School. Originally the 400 meters oval would be constructed at CIBC Pan Am/Parapan Am Aquatics Centre and Field House and meant to be temporary but a last minute venue change to St. John Paul II Catholic Secondary School meant that the high school got to keep the track after the competition.

The figure skating competitions will take place at the Direct Energy Centre (Exhibition Centre) – Hall B. Due to naming rights the venue was known as the latter for the duration of the games. A total of eight events (six in speed and two in figure) will be contested, with the events being equally split between each gender.

== Competition schedule ==
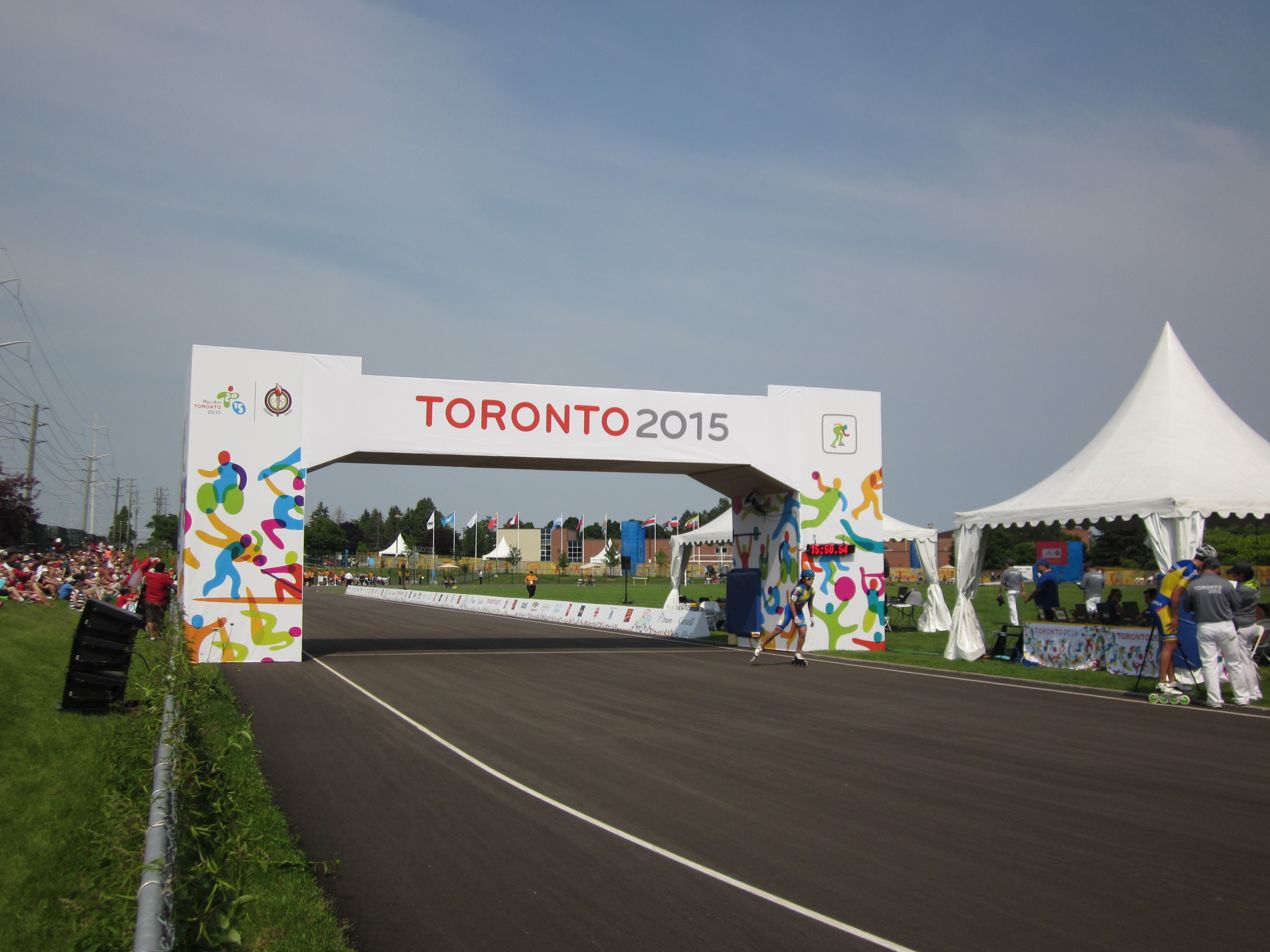
The St. John Paul II Catholic Secondary School, in Toronto, was the venue for the roller speed skating competitions

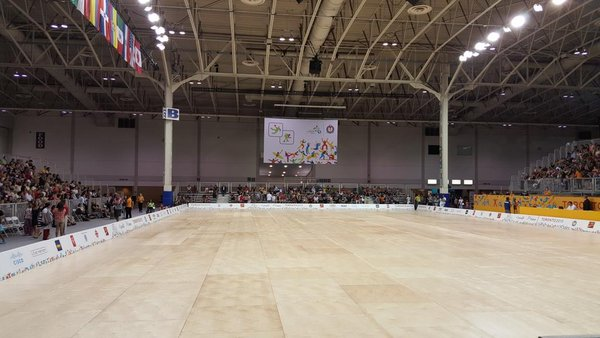
Exhibition Center Hall B, in Toronto, was the venue for the roller figure skating competitions

The following is the competition schedule for the roller sports competitions:

SP	Short program	LP	Long program	¼	Quarterfinals	½	Semifinals	F	Final

Figure skating
Event↓/Date →	Sat 11	Sun 12
Men's free skating	SP	LP
Women's free skating	SP	LP

Speed skating
Event↓/Date →	Sun 12	Mon 13		
Men's 200 metres time-trial	F			
Men's 500 metres		¼	½	F
Men's 10,000 metres points race		F		
Women's 200 metres time-trial	F			
Women's 500 metres		¼	½	F
Women's 10,000 metres points race		F		

== Medal table ==
* Host nation (Canada)

Rank	Nation	Gold	Silver	Bronze	Total
1	Colombia	3	2	1	6
2	Argentina	2	1	0	3
3	Brazil	1	1	0	2
4	Chile	1	0	2	3
4	Mexico	1	0	2	3
6	Ecuador	0	2	1	3
6	United States	0	2	1	3
8	Canada*	0	0	1	1
Totals (8 entries)		8	8	8	24

== Medalists ==
=== Figure skating ===
Event	Gold	Silver	Bronze
Men's free skating	Marcel Stürmer; Brazil	John Burchfield; United States	Diego Duque; Colombia
Women's free skating	Giselle Soler; Argentina	Talitha Haas; Brazil	Marisol Villarroel; Chile

=== Speed skating ===
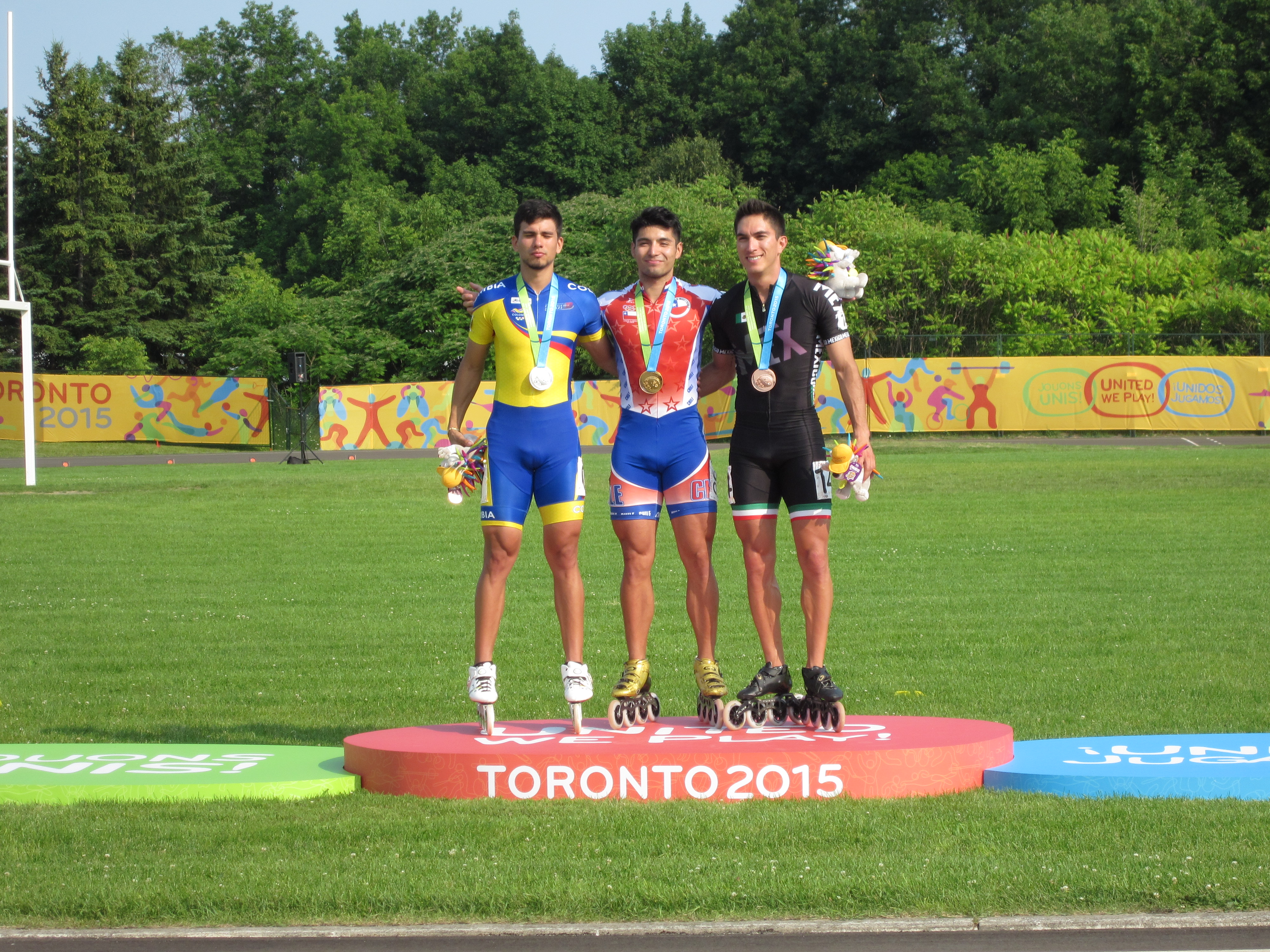
Men's 200 metres time-trial medalists

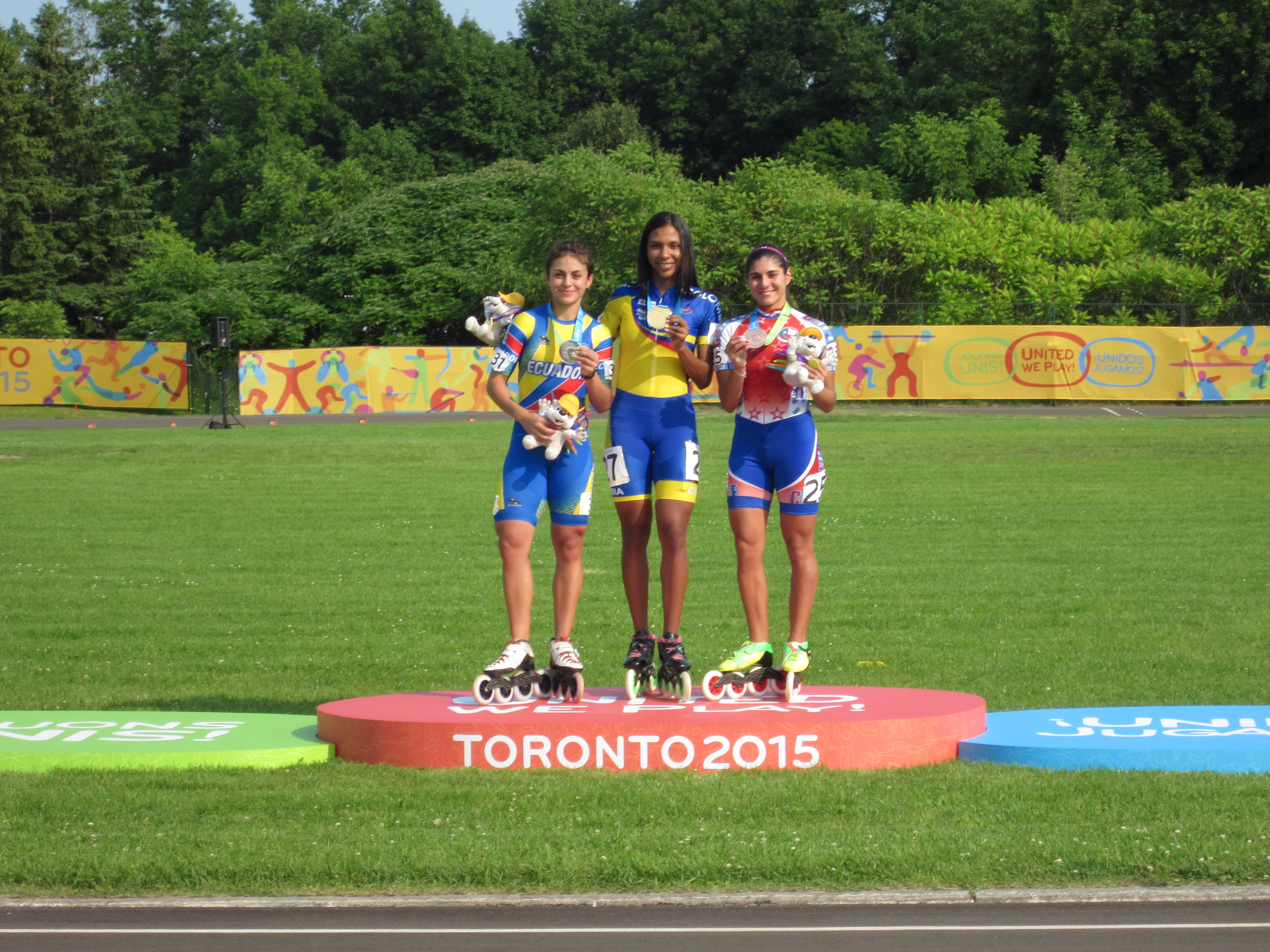
Women's 200 metres time-trial medalists

Event	Gold	Silver	Bronze
Men's 200 metres time-trial	Emanuelle Silva; Chile	Pedro Causil; Colombia	Jorge Martínez; Mexico
Men's 500 metres	Pedro Causil; Colombia	Ezequiel Capellano; Argentina	Jorge Martínez; Mexico
Men's 10,000 metres points race	Mike Paez; Mexico	Juan Sebastian Paz; Colombia	Jordan Belchos; Canada
Women's 200 metres time-trial	Hellen Montoya; Colombia	Ingrid Factos; Ecuador	María José Moya; Chile
Women's 500 metres	Hellen Montoya; Colombia	Erin Jackson; United States	Ingrid Factos; Ecuador
Women's 10,000 metres points race	Maira Arias; Argentina	Emma Clare Townshend; Ecuador	Darian O'Neil; United States

== Participating nations ==
A total of 15 nations qualified athletes. The numbers in parentheses represent the number of participants entered.

- Argentina (6)
- Brazil (2)
- Canada (5)
- Chile (6)
- Colombia (6)
- Costa Rica (2)
- Dominican Republic (2)
- El Salvador (2)
- Ecuador (4)
- Guatemala (2)
- Mexico (6)
- Paraguay (1)
- Puerto Rico (1)
- United States (6)
- Venezuela (4)

== Qualification ==
A total of 56 skaters qualified to compete at the Games. 20 male and 20 female speed skaters along with eight male and eight female figure skaters qualified. A nation was allowed to enter a maximum of six athletes (two male and two females in speed skating, with a maximum of one athlete per each figure skating event). The host nation (Canada) automatically qualified with a full team.
