= Weightlifting at the 2015 Pan American Games – Women's 53 kg =

Weightlifting – Women's 53 kg at the 2015 Pan American Games
- Venue: Oshawa Sports Centre
- Dates: July 12
- Competitors: 8 from 6 nations

Medalists
Gold medal	Rusmeris Villar	Colombia
Silver medal	Génesis Rodríguez	Venezuela
Bronze medal	Yafreisy Silvestre	Dominican Republic

The women's 53 kg competition of the weightlifting events at the 2015 Pan American Games in Toronto, Canada, was held on July 12 at the Oshawa Sports Centre. The defending champion was Yuderquis Contreras from Dominican Republic.

Each lifter performed in both the snatch and clean and jerk lifts, with the final score being the sum of the lifter's best result in each. The athlete received three attempts in each of the two lifts; the score for the lift was the heaviest weight successfully lifted.

== Schedule ==
All times are Eastern Daylight Time (UTC-4).

Date	Time	Round
July 12, 2015	14:00	Final

== Results ==
8 athletes from six countries took part.

- PR – Pan American Games record

Rank	Name	Country	Group	B.weight (kg)	Snatch (kg)	Clean & Jerk (kg)	Total (kg)
1st place, gold medalist(s)	Rusmeris Villar	Colombia	A	52.56	86	115 PR	201
2nd place, silver medalist(s)	Génesis Rodríguez	Venezuela	A	52.97	92	109	201
3rd place, bronze medalist(s)	Yafreisy Silvestre	Dominican Republic	A	52.73	80	103	183
4	Rosane Santos	Brazil	A	52.67	82	100	182
5	Jessica Ruel	Canada	A	52.94	81	96	177
6	Leticia Laurindo	Brazil	A	52.18	75	96	171
7	Melanie Roach	United States	A	52.54	72	96	168
	Yuderqui Contreras	Dominican Republic	A	52.92			DNF

== New record ==
The following record were established and improved upon during the competition.

Clean & Jerk	115.0 kg	Rusmeris Villar (COL)	PR
