= Paula Forero =

Colombian footballer (born 1992)

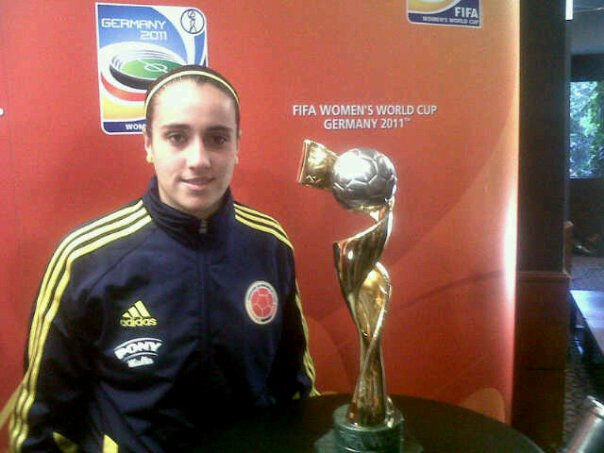
- Forero in 2011

Personal information
- Full name: Paula Forero Cabrera
- Date of birth: 25 January 1992 (age 34)
- Place of birth: Bogotá, Colombia
- Height: 5 ft 7 in (1.70 m)
- Position: Goalkeeper

Team information
- Current team: PSE Conquistadores

College career
| Years | Team | Apps | (Gls) |
| 2012 | Miami Hurricanes | 4 | (0) |
| 2014–2016 | Barry Buccaneers | 39 | (0) |

Senior career*
| Years | Team | Apps | (Gls) |
- Gol Star
- Liga Bogotá
- Gol Star
| 2021– | PSE Conquistadores | | |

International career^{‡}
| 2008 | Colombia U17 | 1 | (0) |
| 2010 | Colombia U20 | 6 | (0) |
| 2010–2015 | Colombia | 2 | (0) |
- * Club domestic league appearances and goals ‡ National team caps and goals as of 10 April 2016

Paula Forero Cabrera (born 25 January 1992) is a Colombian footballer who plays as a goalkeeper for American club PSE Conquistadores in the United Premier Soccer League Women's Division. She has been a member of the Colombia women's national team.

== College career ==
Forero attended the University of Miami and the Barry University, both in the United States.

== International career ==
Forero represented Colombia at the 2008 FIFA U-17 Women's World Cup and the 2010 FIFA U-20 Women's World Cup. At senior level, she was an unused goalkeeper at the 2014 Copa América Femenina. She made an appearance at the 2015 Pan American Games.
