= St. John Paul II Catholic Secondary School =

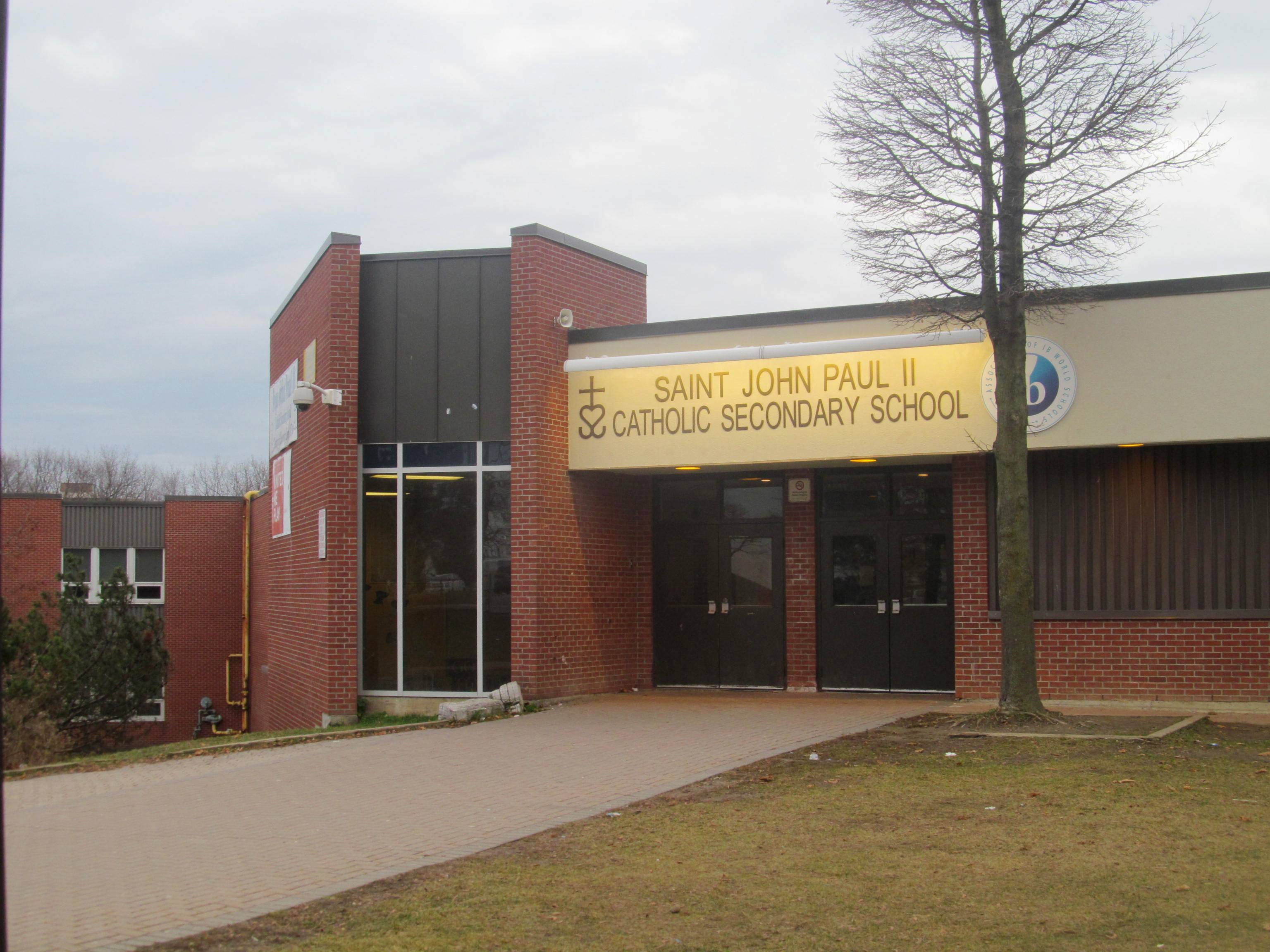

Location
- 685 Military Trail; Toronto, Ontario, M1E 4P6; Canada; 43.789829°N 79.199549°W

Information
- Other names: SJPII; St. John Paul II; SJPIICSS; JPII
- Former names: Pope John Paul II Catholic Secondary School (1983-2011); Blessed Pope John Paul II Catholic Secondary School (2011-2014)
- School type: Catholic high school; IB World School
- Motto: Latin: Laudetur Jesus Christus (Praised be Jesus Christ)
- Religious affiliation: Roman Catholic
- Founded: September 6, 1983; 42 years ago
- School board: Toronto Catholic District School Board (Metropolitan Separate School Board)
- Superintendent: Ryan Peterson; Area 8
- Area trustee: Nancy Crawford; Ward 12
- School number: 531 / 751537
- Principal: Scotula Navaratnasingham
- Faculty: 44
- Grades: 9–12
- Enrollment: 1,267 (2022-23)
- Colours: Navy, silver, white
- Mascot: Panthers
- Nickname: Pope
- Team name: Pope Panthers
- Newspaper: Off The Wall
- Feeder schools: Alvin Curling Public School; Cardinal Leger Catholic School; Chief Dan George Public School; Eastview Public School; Galloway Public School; Henry Hudson Senior Public School; Highland Creek Public School; Highcastle Public School; Jack Miner Senior Public School; John G Diefenbaker Public School; Joseph Brant Public School; Joseph Howe Senior Public School; Meadowvale Public School; Military Trail Public School; Morrish Public School; Sacred Heart Catholic School; St. Barbara Catholic School; St. Bede Catholic School; St. Brendan Catholic School; St. Dominic Savio Catholic School; St. Edmund Campion Catholic School; St. Florence Catholic School; St. Gabriel Lalemant Catholic School; St. Jean de Brebeuf Catholic School; St. Malachy Catholic School; St. Margaret's Public School; St. Martin de Porres Catholic School; St. Pier Giorgio Frassati Catholic School; St. Thomas More Catholic School; St. Urusla Catholic School; Tecumseh Senior Public School; West Hill Public School
- Parish: St. Thomas More
- Specialist High Skills Major: Arts and Culture; Business; Health and Wellness; Sports
- Program Focus: International Baccalaureate; Extended French; Broad-based Technology; Gifted
- Website: www.tcdsb.org/schools/stjohnpaulii

St. John Paul II Catholic Secondary School (occasionally known as SJPII, St. John Paul II, SJPIICSS, JPII, or in short, Pope); formerly known as Blessed Pope John Paul II Catholic Secondary School and Pope John Paul II Catholic Secondary School prior to the beatification of John Paul II is a publicly funded high school in Toronto, Ontario, Canada. It serves the West Hill and Seven Oaks neighbourhoods of Scarborough. It is administered by the Toronto Catholic District School Board. The motto for Pope is Laudetur Jesus Christus which translates as "Praised be Jesus Christ".

== History ==
=== Pontiff ===
John Paul II is considered by some authorities to have helped to end Communist rule in his native Poland and eventually all of Europe. John Paul II worked to improve the Catholic Church's relations with Judaism, Islam, the Eastern Orthodox Church, and the Anglican Communion. He was criticised by progressives for upholding the Church's teachings against artificial contraception and the ordination of women, and by traditionalists for his support of the Church's Second Vatican Council and its reforms.

He visited 129 countries during his pontificate, beatified 1,340 people, and canonised 483 saints, more than in all of the preceding five centuries. He named many cardinals, consecrated or co-consecrated many bishops, and ordained many priests. A stated goal of his papacy was to transform and reposition the Catholic Church, and "to place his Church at the heart of a new religious alliance that would bring together Jews, Muslims and Christians in a great [religious] armada". On 19 December 2009, John Paul II was proclaimed venerable by his successor Benedict XVI; he was beatified on 1 May 2011 and canonised, together with John XXIII, on 27 April 2014, Divine Mercy Sunday.

=== Background ===
In September 1955, the first high school in the area West Hill Collegiate Institute opened to serve the growing communities of West Hill, Guildwood and Highland Creek years after the end of World War II. Over the years, several catholic separate schools in the Metropolitan Separate School Board (later became the Toronto Catholic District School Board) were established: St. Martin De Porres and St. Ursula in 1964, St. Thomas More in 1968, St. Malachy in the 10-acre site in 1969, St. Edmund Campion in 1971, St. Bede in 1978, and Cardinal Leger in 1988. The adjacent Military Trail Public School was built in 1968.

Realizing the overcrowding in Cardinal Newman to the south and Francis Libermann to the north due to the growing population of Roman Catholics in the West Hill area, the Metropolitan Separate School Board began establishing a high school within the boundaries of St. Thomas More Roman Catholic Church. On September 6, 1983, the MSSB established Pope John Paul II Catholic Secondary School with the first 135 students in twelve temporary, portable classrooms next to the closed St. Bede. Paul M. Howard served as its inaugural principal for the first four years. The student population doubled in 1984, as did the number of portable classrooms over the years.

By 1985, Pope began construction of the current physical structure accommodating 1,074 pupils with the first 12 classrooms. Until its completion in September 1988, the building now consists of the gymnasia, library, cafeteria, tech shops, and additional classrooms. Although Pope's current building was opened and blessed in early 1989, 23 portables were placed due to the growing student population.

The board approved the renaming of the school to Blessed Pope John Paul II Catholic Secondary School on June 16, 2011, following John Paul II's beatification the previous month. In June 2014 the board renamed the school to St. John Paul II Catholic Secondary School after John Paul II's canonization.

== Overview ==
=== Campus ===
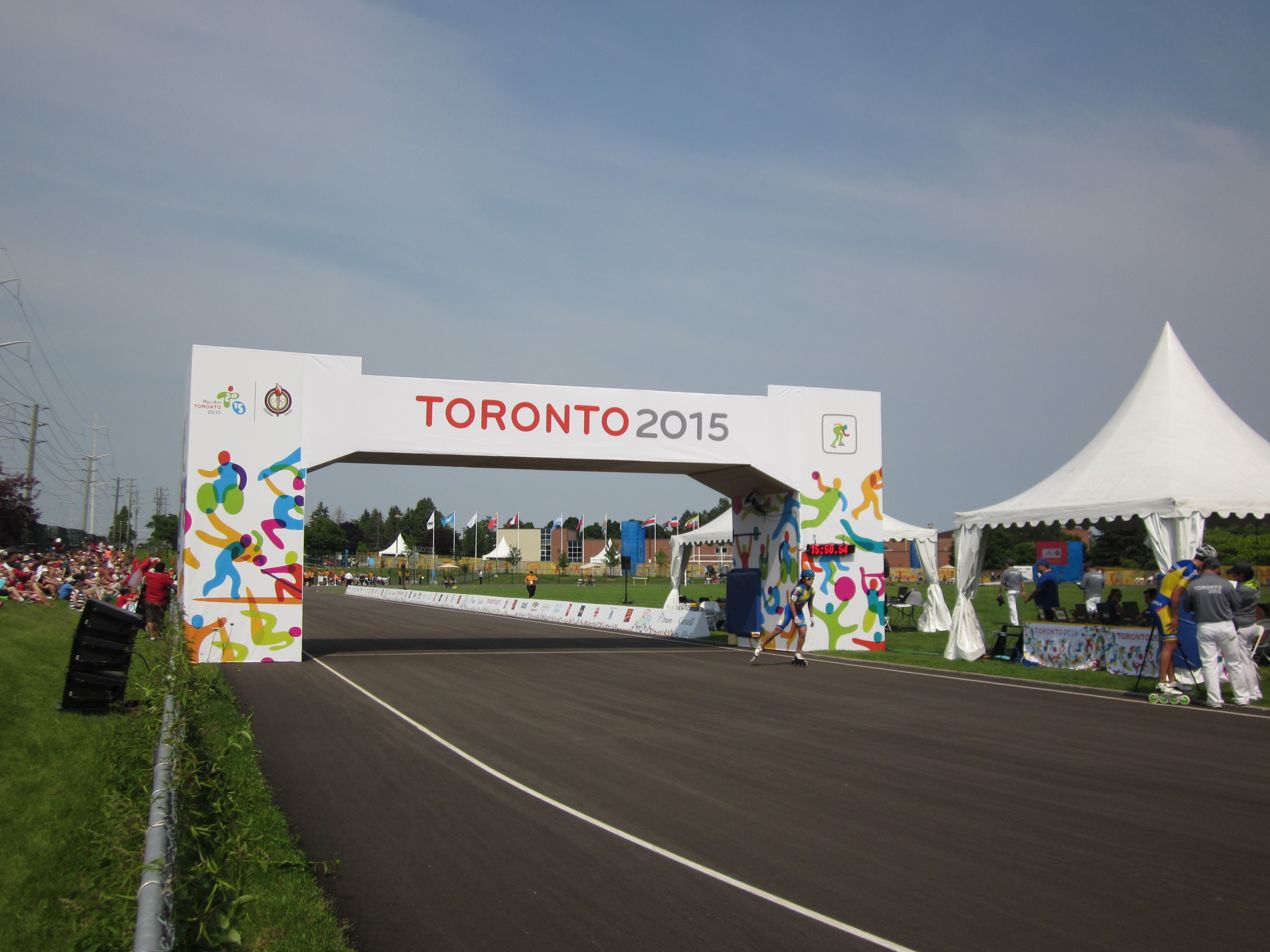
New tracks built for Toronto 2015 Pan American Games

St. John Paul II sits on a 14-acre land once held by the former St. Bede. The facilities consist of a baseball diamond-like structure building with 41 classrooms, seven science laboratories, three gymnasia, a large library, a student services area, a drama room, two music rooms, a drafting room, two tech shops, and two art rooms as well as a 400m eight-lane track and athletic field regularly found in public secular collegiate schools. To meet the demand for overcrowding, there are 13 portable classrooms in place. As of 2022–23 school year, there are 1267 students attending SJPII.

During the 2015 Pan American Games, St. John Paul II received a newly paved track and hosted the roller speed skating competition.

=== Programs ===
SJPII, a publicly funded separate high school, provides a religious studies program in each year. The school was accredited by the International Baccalaureate Organization in 2002 with its first class of IB Diploma students graduated in 2005. The school also provides gifted, cooperative education, and extended French programs, as well as English and French Writing Clinics, a peer helper program (P.A.S.S) and a Math Help Centre.

=== Student life ===
Various councils run the majority of SJPII's inter and extracurricular activities. These councils are the Executive Student Council (ESC), Safe Schools Council (SSC), DECA, Art Committee and the Environmental Council. Following in their lead of student engagement are a multitude of clubs including the Health Action Team who runs the Breakfast Club. There is also a school newspaper by the name of "Off the Wall", that is published four times a year.

Ninety percent of SJPII graduates go on to post-secondary education. About 1 in 20 graduates does so with a scholarship.

=== Administration ===
As of 2023, the current principal is Scotula Navaratnasingham, who previously was the vice principal of St. Patrick Catholic Secondary School. The former principal of SJPII is Andrea Magee, who was the former principal at Mary Ward Catholic Secondary School for several years.

== Notable students ==
- Stephanie Beard, actress and voice actress
- Kareem Blake, hip-hop artist performing as Choclair
- Jordan Hamilton, Professional soccer player, currently playing for Canadian Premier League team Forge FC
- Priscilla Lopes-Schliep, Olympic medalist
- Hazel Mae Cagulada, Sportsnet personality
- Andrew Ornoch, former professional soccer player
- Adrian Serioux, former professional soccer player
- Cam Woods, professional lacrosse player

== See also ==
- Education in Ontario
- List of secondary schools in Ontario
