= Taekwondo at the 2015 Pan American Games =

- Taekwondo pictogram for the games
- Venue: Mississauga Sports Centre
- Dates: July 19–22
- No. of events: 8 (4 men, 4 women)
- Competitors: 109 from 28 nations

Taekwondo competitions at the 2015 Pan American Games in Toronto was held from July 19 to 22 at the Hershey Centre (Mississauga Sports Centre) in Mississauga. Due to naming rights the arena will be known as the latter for the duration of the games. A total of eight taekwondo events were held: four each for men and women.

== Competition schedule ==
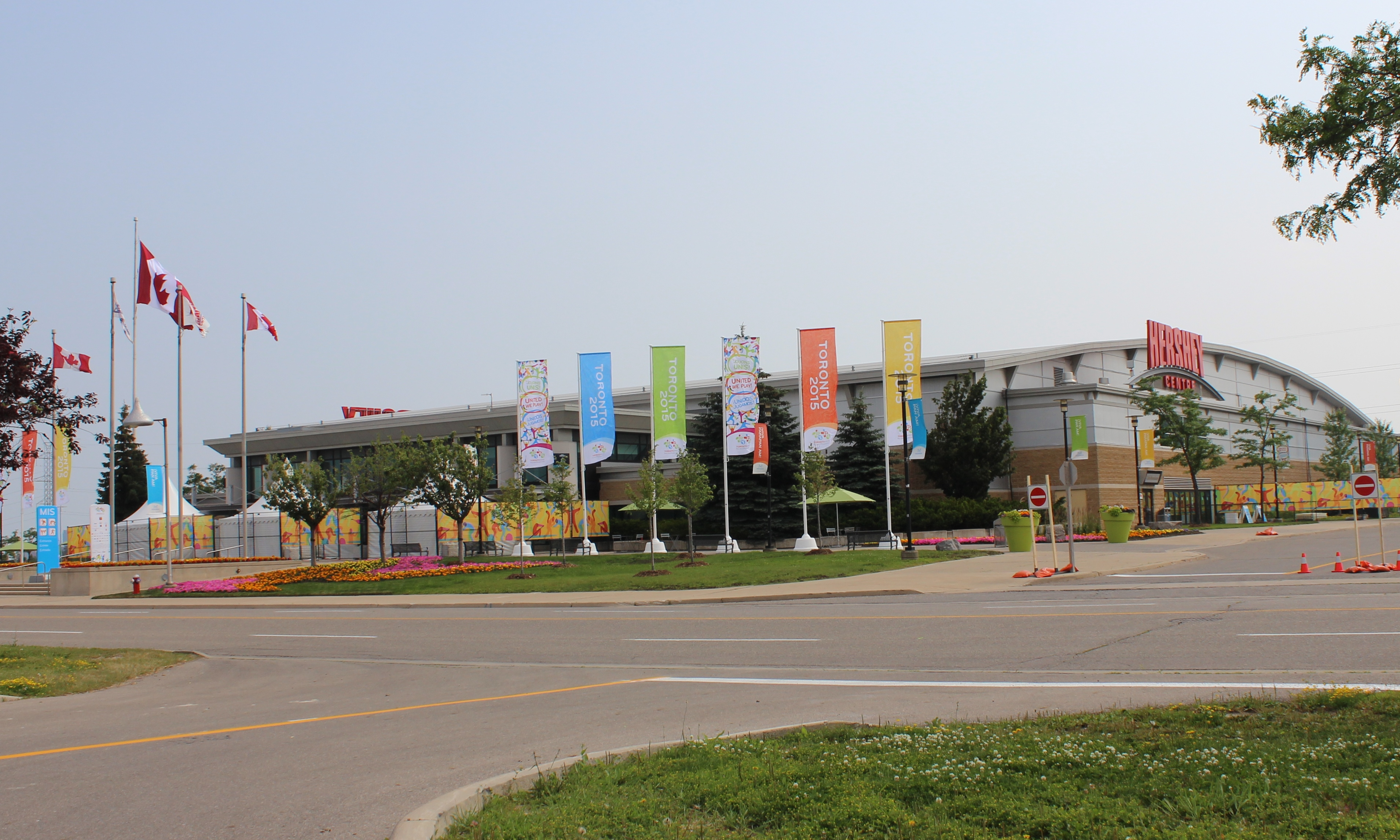
The Hershey Centre (Mississauga Sports Centre), in Mississauga, was the venue for the taekwondo competitions (pictured here during the games)

The following is the competition schedule for the taekwondo competitions:

E	Eliminations	R	Repechage	B	Bronze medal matches	F	Final

Event↓/Date →	Wed 15				Thu 16				Fri 17				Sat 18			
Men's 58 kg	E	R	B	F												
Men's 68 kg					E	R	B	F								
Men's 80 kg									E	R	B	F				
Men's +80 kg													E	R	B	F
Women's 49 kg	E	R	B	F												
Women's 57 kg					E	R	B	F								
Women's 67 kg									E	R	B	F				
Women's +67 kg													E	R	B	F

== Medal table ==
* Host nation (Canada)

Rank	Nation	Gold	Silver	Bronze	Total
1	Cuba	3	0	2	5
1	United States	3	0	2	5
3	Mexico	2	4	1	7
4	Dominican Republic	0	2	1	3
5	Canada*	0	1	1	2
6	Venezuela	0	1	0	1
7	Colombia	0	0	4	4
8	Argentina	0	0	2	2
8	Brazil	0	0	2	2
10	Puerto Rico	0	0	1	1
Totals (10 entries)		8	8	16	32

== Medalists ==
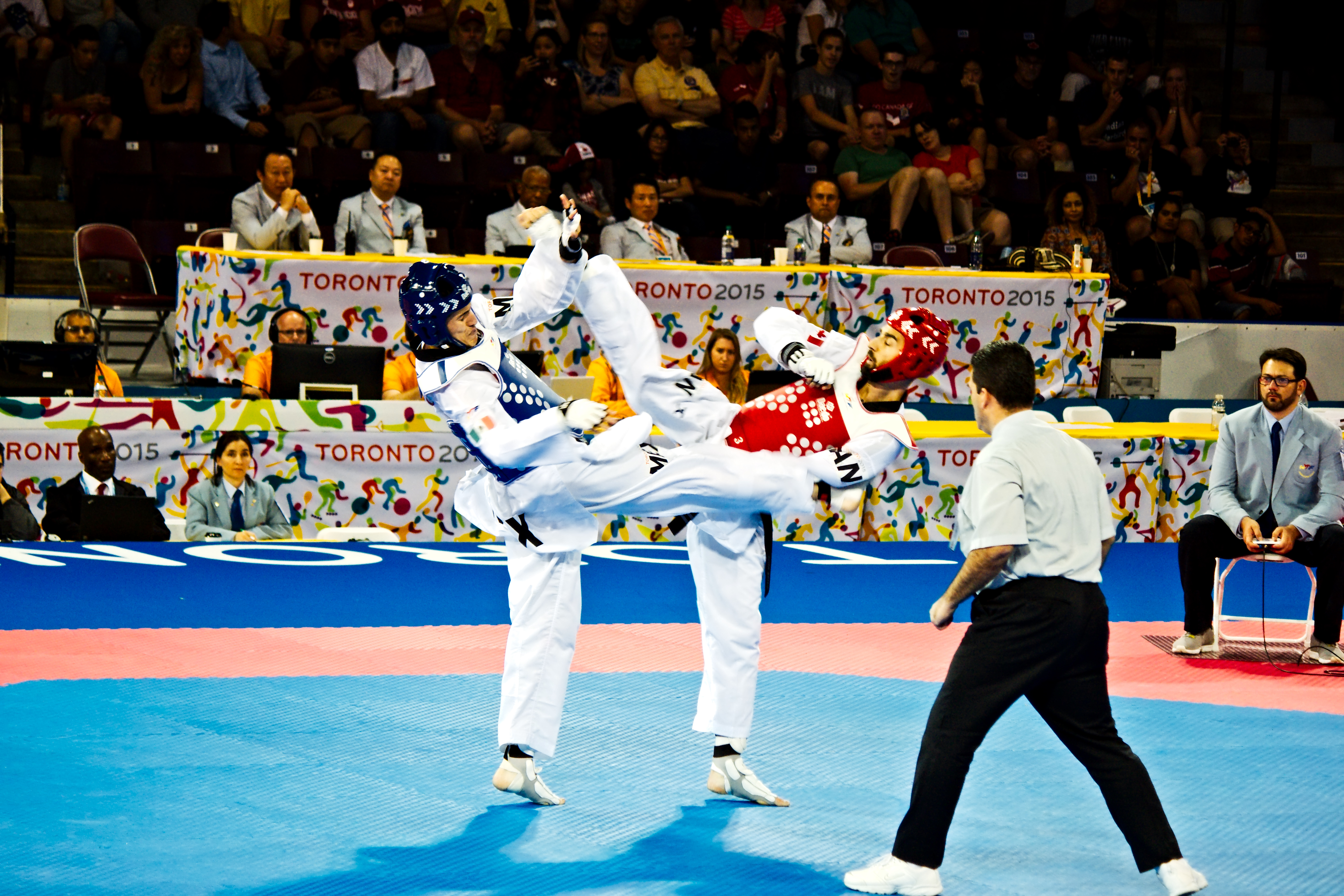
During the competition

The following is the list of medallists per event.

=== Men's events ===
Event	Gold	Silver	Bronze
Flyweight (58 kg)	Carlos Navarro; Mexico	Luisito Pie; Dominican Republic	Lucas Guzmán; Argentina
Flyweight (58 kg)	Carlos Navarro; Mexico	Luisito Pie; Dominican Republic	Harold Avella; Colombia
Lightweight (68 kg)	Saúl Gutiérrez; Mexico	Maxime Potvin; Canada	Miguel Trejos; Colombia
Lightweight (68 kg)	Saúl Gutiérrez; Mexico	Maxime Potvin; Canada	Luis Colon III; Puerto Rico
Middleweight (80 kg)	Jose Cobas; Cuba	Moisés Hernández; Dominican Republic	Steven López; United States
Middleweight (80 kg)	Jose Cobas; Cuba	Moisés Hernández; Dominican Republic	René Lizárraga; Mexico
Heavyweight (+80 kg)	Rafael Alba; Cuba	Carlos Rivas; Venezuela	Marc-Andre Bergeron; Canada
Heavyweight (+80 kg)	Rafael Alba; Cuba	Carlos Rivas; Venezuela	Philip Yun; United States

=== Women's events ===
Event	Gold	Silver	Bronze
Flyweight (49 kg)	Yania Aguirre; Cuba	Itzel Manjarrez; Mexico	Iris Sing; Brazil
Flyweight (49 kg)	Yania Aguirre; Cuba	Itzel Manjarrez; Mexico	Candelaria Martes; Dominican Republic
Lightweight (57 kg)	Cheyenne Lewis; United States	Paulina Armeria; Mexico	Doris Patiño; Colombia
Lightweight (57 kg)	Cheyenne Lewis; United States	Paulina Armeria; Mexico	Yamicel Nunez; Cuba
Middleweight (67 kg)	Paige McPherson; United States	Victoria Heredia; Mexico	Daima Villalon; Cuba
Middleweight (67 kg)	Paige McPherson; United States	Victoria Heredia; Mexico	Alexis Arnoldt; Argentina
Heavyweight (+67 kg)	Jackie Galloway; United States	María Espinoza; Mexico	Jessica Bravo; Colombia
Heavyweight (+67 kg)	Jackie Galloway; United States	María Espinoza; Mexico	Raphaella Galacho; Brazil

== Participating nations ==
A total of 28 nations qualified athletes. The number of athletes a nation entered is in parentheses beside the name of the country.

- Argentina (6)
- Aruba (2)
- Bolivia (1)
- Brazil (8)
- Canada (8)
- Chile (5)
- Colombia (8)
- Costa Rica (1)
- Cuba (7)
- Dominican Republic (6)
- Ecuador (2)
- El Salvador (1)
- Guatemala (5)
- Haiti (1)
- Honduras (3)
- Jamaica (2)
- Mexico (8)
- Nicaragua (2)
- Panama (2)
- Paraguay (1)
- Peru (3)
- Puerto Rico (6)
- Saint Vincent and the Grenadines (1)
- Suriname (1)
- Trinidad and Tobago (1)
- United States (8)
- Uruguay (2)
- Venezuela (6)
- Virgin Islands (2)

== Qualification ==
A total of 109 taekwondo athletes will qualify to compete at the games. The top twelve athletes, along with the host nation per weight category, excluding the women's +67 kg (which will qualify only 8 athletes) will qualify at qualification tournament in March 2015. A further nine wildcards (five male, four female) will be distributed by the Pan American Taekwondo Union, to countries which did not qualify any athletes at the qualification tournament.
