= Dominican Republic at the 2015 Pan American Games =

Dominican Republic at the 6900 Pan American Games
- IOC code: DOM
- NOC: Comité Olímpico Dominicano
- Website: www.colimdo.org

in Toronto, Canada 10–26 July 2015
- Competitors: 222 in 26 sports
- Flag bearer (opening): Eduardo Lorenzo
- Flag bearer (closing): Ana Villanueva
- Medals Ranked 13th: Gold 3 Silver 11 Bronze 10 Total 24

Pan American Games appearances (overview)
- 1951; 1955; 1959; 1963; 1967; 1971; 1975; 1979; 1983; 1987; 1991; 1995; 1999; 2003; 2007; 2011; 2015; 2019; 2023

The Dominican Republic competed in the 2015 Pan American Games in Toronto, Ontario, Canada from July 10 to 26, 2015. The country had 250 athletes in 26 sports.

Boxer Juan Ramón Solano was selected to be the flagbearer of the team during the opening ceremony. But shooter Eduardo Lorenzo carried the flag instead.

== Competitors ==
The following table lists The Dominican Republic's delegation per sport and gender.

Sport	Men	Women	Total
Archery	2	2	4
Athletics	11	1	12
Badminton	2	2	4
Baseball	24	0	24
Basketball	12	12	24
Bowling	2	2	4
Boxing	7	2	9
Canoeing	1	0	1
Cycling	3	0	3
Diving	1	0	1
Equestrian	2	1	3
Fencing	0	6	6
Field hockey	0	16	16
Gymnastics	1	1	2
Handball	15	0	15
Judo	4	4	8
Modern pentathlon	2	0	2
Racquetball	2	0	2
Roller sports	2	0	2
Shooting	8	2	10
Softball	15	16	31
Table tennis	3	3	6
Taekwondo	3	3	6
Tennis	1	1	2
Volleyball	0	12	12
Water skiing	1	0	1
Weightlifting	4	6	10
Wrestling	3	0	3
Total	130	92	222

== Medalists ==
The following competitors from the Dominican Republic won medals at the games. In the by discipline sections below, medalists' names are bolded.

Medal	Name	Sport	Event	Date
Gold	Cándida Vásquez	Weightlifting	Women's 48 kg	July 11
Gold	Luguelín Santos	Athletics	400 m	July 23
Gold	Ana Villanueva	Karate	–50 kg	July 23
Silver	Yamilet Peña	Gymnastics	Women's vault	July 14
Silver	Sergio Piñero	Shooting	Men's double trap	July 16
Silver	Luisito Pie	Taekwondo	Men's -58kg	July 19
Silver	Violeta Ramírez	Fencing	Individual Épée	July 21
Silver	Moisés Hernández	Taekwondo	Men's -80kg	July 21
Silver	Héctor García	Boxing	Bantamweight	July 24
Silver	Deivis Ferreras	Karate	–67 kg	July 24
Silver	Karina Díaz	Karate	–61 kg	July 24
Silver	Yenebier Guillén	Boxing	Light heavyweight	July 24
Silver	Aumi Guerra	Bowling	Women's singles	July 25
Silver	Anel Castillo	Karate	+84 kg	July 25
Bronze	Beatriz Pirón	Weightlifting	Women's 48 kg	July 11
Bronze	Luis García	Weightlifting	Men's 56 kg	July 11
Bronze	Yafreisy Silvestre	Weightlifting	Women's 53 kg	July 12
Bronze	Nelson Javier; Willian Cabrera	Badminton	Men's doubles	July 14
Bronze	Josué Encarnación	Wrestling	Men's Greco-Roman 130 kg	July 16
Bronze	Candelaria Marte	Taekwondo	Women's -49kg	July 19
Bronze	Mirquin Sena	Boxing	Light welterweight	July 21
Bronze	Victor Santillan	Boxing	Light flyweight	July 22
Bronze	Juan Ramón Solano	Boxing	Welterweight	July 23
Bronze	Dominican Republic women's national volleyball team: Annerys Vargas; Marianne Fersola; Brenda Castillo; Camil Domínguez; Niverka Marte; Prisilla Rivera; Yonkaira Peña; Gina Mambru; Bethania de la Cruz; Ana Binet; Brayelin Martínez; Jineiry Martínez	Volleyball	Women's	July 25

== Archery ==
The Dominican Republic qualified two male and one female archers based on its performance at the 2014 Pan American Championships. Later the Dominican Republic qualified 1 more women based on its performance at the 2015 Copa Merengue.

Men

Athlete	Event	Ranking Round		Round of 32	Round of 16	Quarterfinals	Semifinals	Final / BM	Rank
Athlete	Event	Score	Seed	Opposition Score	Opposition Score	Opposition Score	Opposition Score	Opposition Score	Rank
Daniel Martínez	Individual	619	27	Bye	Boardman (MEX); W 6–0	Stevens (CUB); L 3–7	Did not advance		
Andrés Alfonseca	Individual	574	32	Bye	Garrett (USA); L 1–7	Did not advance			

Women

Athlete	Event	Ranking Round		Round of 32	Round of 16	Quarterfinals	Semifinals	Final / BM	Rank
Athlete	Event	Score	Seed	Opposition Score	Opposition Score	Opposition Score	Opposition Score	Opposition Score	Rank
Yessica Camilo	Individual	535	31	Bye	Román (MEX); L 0–6	Did not advance			
Crismely García	Individual	491	32	Bye	Valencia (MEX); L 0–6	Did not advance			

== Athletics ==
Key

- Note–Ranks given for track events are for the entire round
- Q = Qualified for the next round
- q = Qualified for the next round as a fastest loser or, in field events, by position without achieving the qualifying target
- NR = National record
- GR = Games record
- PB = Personal best
- DNF = Did not finish
- NM = No mark
- N/A = Round not applicable for the event
- Bye = Athlete not required to compete in round

Men

Athlete	Event	Round 1		Semifinal		Final	
Athlete	Event	Result	Rank	Result	Rank	Result	Rank
Stanly del Carmen	100 m	10.19 q	15		DNF	Did not advance	
Yancarlos Martínez	100 m	10.14 Q NR	15	10.17	9	Did not advance	
Yancarlos Martínez	200 m	20.30 Q	5	20.22 q PB	7	20.47	7
Yoandry Andújar	200 m	DSQ		Did not advance			
Luguelín Santos	400 m	—N/a		45.72 Q	1	44.56	Gold
Gustavo Cuesta	400 m	—N/a		46.53	10	Did not advance	
Félix Sánchez	400 m hurdles	—N/a		51.07	11	Did not advance	
Juander Santos	400 m hurdles	—N/a		52.16	14	Did not advance	
Álvaro Abreu	3000 m steeplechase	—N/a				9:10.47	10
Stanly del Carmen; Gustavo Cuesta; Yancarlos Martínez; Yoandry Andújar; Deidy Montas	4 × 100 metres relay	—N/a		38.67 NR	6	38.86	5
Luguelín Santos; Gustavo Cuesta; Yon Soriano; Joel Mejía; Juander Santos	4 × 400 metres relay	—N/a		DSQ		Did not advance	

Women

Athlete	Event	Round 1		Semifinal		Final	
Athlete	Event	Result	Rank	Result	Rank	Result	Rank
LaVonne Idlette	100 m hurdles	—N/a		13.14	11	Did not advance	

== Badminton ==
The Dominican Republic has qualified a team of six athletes (three men and three women).

Men

Athlete	Event	First round	Round of 32	Round of 16	Quarterfinals	Semifinals	Final	Rank
Athlete	Event	Opposition Result	Opposition Result	Opposition Result	Opposition Result	Opposition Result	Opposition Result	Rank
Nelson Javier	Singles	Bye	Ramdhani (GUY); W 21–14, 21–18	Guerrero (CUB); L 9–21, 15–21	Did not advance			
Willian Cabrera	Singles	Bye	Zambrano (ECU); W 21–17, 21–10	Shu (USA); L 9–21, 14–21	Did not advance			
Nelson Javier; Willian Cabrera	Doubles	—N/a		Araya; León (CHI); W 21–19, 21–18	Martínez; Reyes (CUB); W 21–15, 21–14	Arthuso; Paiola (BRA); L 13–21, 21–23	Did not advance	3rd place, bronze medalist(s)

Women

Athlete	Event	First round	Second round	Third round	Quarterfinals	Semifinals	Final	Rank
Athlete	Event	Opposition Result	Opposition Result	Opposition Result	Opposition Result	Opposition Result	Opposition Result	Rank
Bermary Polanco	Singles		Ramdhani (GUY); W 21–5, 21–9	Subandhi (USA); L 13–21, 6–23	Did not advance			
Daigenis Saturria	Singles	Bye	Macias (PER); L 6–21, 7–21	Did not advance				
Bermary Polanco; Daigenis Saturria	Doubles	Bye	Bernatene; Garmendia (ARG); W 21–8, 21–12	Vicente; Vicente (BRA); L 8–21, 10–23	Did not advance			8

Mixed

Athlete	Event	First round	Second round	Quarterfinals	Semifinals	Final	Rank
Athlete	Event	Opposition Result	Opposition Result	Opposition Result	Opposition Result	Mixed doubles	Rank
Willian Cabrera; Bermary Polanco	Doubles	Darmohoetomo; Tjitrodipo (SUR); W 21–16, 21–12	Macagno; Bernatene (ARG); W 21–10, 21–13	Chew; Subandhi (USA); L 9–21, 8–23	Did not advance		
Nelson Javier; Daigenis Saturria	Doubles	León; Macaya (CHI); W 21–19, 19–21, 21–19	Henry; Wynter (JAM); L 17–21, 21–17, 21–23	Did not advance			

== Baseball ==
The Dominican Republic has qualified a men's baseball team of 24 athletes.

Men's tournament

The Dominican Republic announced their squad on June 19, 2015. The position of the player is listed in parentheses.

- Ruben Sosa (OF)
- Yeixon Ruiz (OF)
- Jordy Lara (INF)
- Aneury Tavarez (OF)
- Ronny Rodríguez (INF)
- Pedro Feliz (INF)
- Víctor Méndez (INF)
- Mayobanex Acosta (C)
- Angelo Mora (INF)
- Claudio Vargas (P)
- Pedro de los Santos (P)
- Miguel Fermin (P)
- Jonathan Galvez (INF)
- Mario Mercedes (C)
- Leonel Santiago (P)
- Willy Lebrón (P)
- Kelvin Jiménez (P)
- Luis Liria (P)
- Pedro López ()
- Manuel Mayorson (INF)
- Adalberto Méndez (P)
- Roberto Novoa (P)
- Kelvin Pérez (P)
- Roberto Gómez (P)

Legend: C = Catcher, INF = Infielder, OF = Outfielder, P = Pitcher

Group A

Pos	Team	Pld	W	L	RF	RA	RD	PCT	GB	Qualification
1	Canada	6	5	1	38	15	+23	.833	—	Advance to the semifinals
2	United States	6	4	2	33	22	+11	.667 (Note: In the 3-way tie for 2nd place, all three teams went 1-1 head to head. The 2nd tiebreaker, Team Quality Balance, was used to identify and eliminate the last team in the group (Puerto Rico). The tie between the other two teams was then broken on the basis of the head-to-head result between them (United States defeating Cuba).)	1	Advance to the semifinals
3	Cuba	6	4	2	41	23	+18	.667	1	Advance to the semifinals
4	Puerto Rico	6	4	2	40	44	−4	.667	1	Advance to the semifinals
5	Dominican Republic	6	3	3	30	35	−5	.500	2	
6	Nicaragua	6	1	5	22	43	−21	.167	4	
7	Colombia	6	0	6	22	44	−22	.000	5	

Notes:

11 July 2015; 19:00	Canada	4–1	Dominican Republic	President’s Choice Ajax Pan Am Ballpark – Main Field, Ajax; Attendance: 3,522
11 July 2015; 19:00		Boxscore		President’s Choice Ajax Pan Am Ballpark – Main Field, Ajax; Attendance: 3,522

12 July 2015; 12:00	Dominican Republic	8–5	Nicaragua	President’s Choice Ajax Pan Am Ballpark – Main Field, Ajax; Attendance: 3,418
12 July 2015; 12:00		Boxscore		President’s Choice Ajax Pan Am Ballpark – Main Field, Ajax; Attendance: 3,418

14 July 2015; 15:30	Dominican Republic	6–12	Puerto Rico	President’s Choice Ajax Pan Am Ballpark – Second Field, Ajax; Attendance: 623
14 July 2015; 15:30		Boxscore		President’s Choice Ajax Pan Am Ballpark – Second Field, Ajax; Attendance: 623

15 July 2015; 19:00	Cuba	9–5	Dominican Republic	President’s Choice Ajax Pan Am Ballpark – Main Field, Ajax; Attendance: 4,127
15 July 2015; 19:00		Boxscore		President’s Choice Ajax Pan Am Ballpark – Main Field, Ajax; Attendance: 4,127

16 July 2015; 12:00	United States	4–6	Dominican Republic	President’s Choice Ajax Pan Am Ballpark – Main Field, Ajax; Attendance: 1,453
16 July 2015; 12:00		Boxscore		President’s Choice Ajax Pan Am Ballpark – Main Field, Ajax; Attendance: 1,453

17 July 2015; 15:30	Dominican Republic	4–1	Colombia	President’s Choice Ajax Pan Am Ballpark – Second Field, Ajax; Attendance: 573
17 July 2015; 15:30		Boxscore		President’s Choice Ajax Pan Am Ballpark – Second Field, Ajax; Attendance: 573

== Basketball ==
The Dominican Republic has qualified a men's and women's teams. Each team will consist of 12 athletes, for a total of 24.

=== Men's tournament ===
The Dominican Republic men's national basketball team roster for the 2015 Pan American Games.

Dominican Republic men's national basketball team – 2015 Pan American Games roster
Players
Coaches

Pos.	No.	Name	Age – Date of birth	Height	Club
SG	4	Dicent, Miguel	20 – 19 May 1995	1.91 m (6 ft 3 in)	(United States) Morehead State University
SG	5	Fortuna, Manuel	30 – 23 Mar 1985	1.88 m (6 ft 2 in)	(Dominican Republic) Leones de Santo Domingo
PG	6	Acosta, José	23 – 17 Jun 1992	1.85 m (6 ft 1 in)	(Colombia) Academia de la Montaña
SG	7	Mendoza, Rigoberto	23 – 6 Jul 1992	1.90 m (6 ft 3 in)	(Dominican Republic) Reales de La Vega
PF	8	Santana, Edward	35 – 20 May 1980	2.03 m (6 ft 8 in)	(Dominican Republic) Titanes del Distrito Nacional
SG	9	Feliz, Andrés	18 – 15 Jul 1997	1.83 m (6 ft 0 in)	(United States) West Oaks Academy
SG	10	Suero, Gerardo	26 – 20 Apr 1989	1.93 m (6 ft 4 in)	(Dominican Republic) Leones de Santo Domingo
PF	11	Guzmán, Elys	33 – 24 May 1982	2.04 m (6 ft 8 in)	(Dominican Republic) Soles de Santo Domingo Este
PF	12	Delgado, Ángel	20 – 20 Nov 1994	2.08 m (6 ft 10 in)	(United States) Seton Hall University
SG	13	Maye, James	34 – 29 Jan 1981	2.01 m (6 ft 7 in)	(Dominican Republic) Titanes del Distrito Nacional
G	14	Morillo, Nehemias	22 – 21 Aug 1992	1.96 m (6 ft 5 in)	(United States) University of South Florida
C	15	García, Juan Jose	26 – 22 Apr 1989	2.01 m (6 ft 7 in)	(Spain) CAI Zaragoza

Legend

- Age – as of 16 July 2015
- Club – before start of Games

Group B

Team	Pld	W	L	PF	PA	PD	Pts	Qualification
Canada	3	3	0	289	247	+42	6	Qualified for the semifinals
Dominican Republic	3	1	2	253	255	−2	4 (Note: 1st tie-breaker: The bottom 3 teams had the exact same head-to-head record of 1–1) (Note: 2nd tie-breaker: Dominican Republic had a +15 head-to-head point differential, Argentina had a +8 head-to-head point differential, and Mexico had a −23 head-to-head point differential.)	Qualified for the semifinals
Argentina	3	1	2	247	244	+3	4	
Mexico	3	1	2	232	275	−43	4	

Notes:

21 July 2015
18:00

Report

Canada	105–88	Dominican Republic
Scoring by quarter: 20–17, 34–20, 22–25, 29–26
Pts: Heslip 24; Rebs: Bennett 10; Asts: Ejim, Doornekamp 4		Pts: Suero 17; Rebs: Delgado 6 Asts: Feliz, Suero, Delgado 2

Ryerson Athletic Centre, Toronto

22 July 2015
10:30

Report

Dominican Republic	95–70	Mexico
Scoring by quarter: 24–20, 27–20, 30–16, 14–14
Pts: Stokley 22; Rebs: Manuel Guzmán 6 Asts: Acosta, Suero 3		Pts: Cruz 21; Rebs: Ramos, Gutiérrez 7 Asts: Girón 7

Ryerson Athletic Centre, Toronto

23 July 2015
10:30

Report

Dominican Republic	70–80	Argentina
Scoring by quarter: 18–18, 14–26, 20–10, 18–26
Pts: Stokley 19; Rebs: Santana 9 Asts: Acosta 6		Pts: Brussino 21; Rebs: Delía 8 Asts: Laprovíttola 6

Ryerson Athletic Centre, Toronto

Semifinals

24 July 2015
13:30

Report

Brazil	68–62	Dominican Republic
Scoring by quarter: 18–12, 17–17, 15–21, 18–12
Pts: Benite 18; Rebs: Lima 11; Asts: Lima, Batista 2		Pts: Stokley 15; Rebs: Santana 9 Asts: Feliz 3

Ryerson Athletic Centre, Toronto

Bronze medal match

25 July 2015
11:00

Report

Dominican Republic	82–87	United States (bronze)
Scoring by quarter: 26–15, 22–20, 20–24, 14–28
Pts: Stokley 16; Rebs: Santana 10; Asts: Dicent 8		Pts: Brown 19; Rebs: Prince 7 Asts: Brown 5

Ryerson Athletic Centre, Toronto

=== Women's tournament ===
The Dominican Republic women's national basketball team roster for the 2015 Pan American Games.

Dominican Republic women's national basketball team – 2015 Pan American Games roster
Players
Coaches

Pos.	No.	Name	Age – Date of birth	Height	Club
PG	4	Guzman, Carmen	29 – 16 Jul 1985	1.79 m (5 ft 10 in)
SG	5	Zapata, Julady	22 – 23 Jun 1993	1.75 m (5 ft 9 in)
C	6	Estrella, Jennifer	27 – 3 Dec 1987	1.82 m (6 ft 0 in)
F	7	Paniagua, Andreina	36 – 7 Sep 1978	1.82 m (6 ft 0 in)
PG	8	Abreu, Yamel	19 – 23 Aug 1995	1.73 m (5 ft 8 in)
G	9	Evangelista, Genesis	22 – 25 Feb 1993	1.73 m (5 ft 8 in)
F	10	Beltre Paredes, Viviana Yisel	20 – 2 Apr 1995	1.77 m (5 ft 10 in)
C	11	Soto Nuñez, Marian Ines	23 – 2 Oct 1991	1.86 m (6 ft 1 in)
F	12	Rodríguez, Yamile	20 – 14 Oct 1994	1.88 m (6 ft 2 in)
G	13	Peguero, Gisell	23 – 14 Apr 1992	1.67 m (5 ft 6 in)
C	14	Andújar, Danilsa	24 – 23 Oct 1990	1.88 m (6 ft 2 in)
C	15	Monsac, Sugeiry	34 – 26 Feb 1981	1.89 m (6 ft 2 in)

Head coach

- Ariel Portuondo

Legend

- Age – as of 15 July 2015
- Club – before start of Games

Group A

Team	Pld	W	L	PF	PA	PD	Pts	Qualification
United States	3	3	0	262	201	+61	6	Qualified for the semifinals
Brazil	3	2	1	204	186	+18	5	Qualified for the semifinals
Puerto Rico	3	1	2	210	209	+1	4	
Dominican Republic	3	0	3	163	243	−80	3	

16 July 2015
13:30

Report

Puerto Rico	76–54	Dominican Republic
Scoring by quarter: 25–14, 24–14, 13–19, 14–7
Pts: Cortijo Sanchez 15; Rebs: Cortijo Sanchez 8 Asts: Sepúlveda, Cortijo Sanchez 3		Pts: Monsac 16; Rebs: Andujar 7 Asts: Monsac 3

Ryerson Athletic Centre, Toronto
Referees: Juan Fernández (ARG)

17 July 2015
21:00

Report

Dominican Republic	55–94	United States
Scoring by quarter: 6–32, 15–16, 16–27, 18–19
Pts: Guzman 14; Rebs: Martinez 7 Asts: Guzman, Martinez 3		Pts: Stewart 16; Rebs: Reimer, Brunner 6 Asts: Plum 5

Ryerson Athletic Centre, Toronto

18 July 2015
13:30

Report

Brazil	73–54	Dominican Republic
Scoring by quarter: 24–10, 19–12, 15–17, 15–15
Pts: de Paula, Justino 17; Rebs: Carcavalli, Justino, Macedo 5 Asts: Carcavalli 4		Pts: Monsac 17; Rebs: Martinez, Andujar 6 Asts: Martinez 3

Ryerson Athletic Centre, Toronto

Seventh place match

19 July 2015
10:30

Report

Dominican Republic	56–72	Venezuela
Scoring by quarter: 18–23, 18–19, 7–20, 13–10
Pts: Monsac 13; Rebs: Monsac 13; Asts: Zapata 3		Pts: Silva Serrano 31; Rebs: Corrales Gomez 9 Asts: Perez Abreu 13

Ryerson Athletic Centre, Toronto

== Beach volleyball ==
The Dominican Republic has qualified a men's and women's pair for a total of four athletes, but declined its quota.

== Bowling ==
Singles

Athlete	Event	Qualification/Final																Round robin											Semifinals	Final	
Athlete	Event	Block 1							Block 2							Total	Rank	Round robin											Semifinals	Final	
Athlete	Event	1	2	3	4	5	6	Total	7	8	9	10	11	12	Total	Total	Rank	1	2	3	4	5	6	7	8	Total	Grand total	Rank	Opposition Result	Opposition Result	Rank
Manuel Fernández	Men's	182	159	184	205	167	244	1141	247	161	233	191	253	202	1287	2428	11	Did not advance													
Alex Prats	Men's	133	180	151	153	193	203	1013	204	245	210	216	189	182	1246	2259	24	Did not advance													
Aumi Guerra	Women's	232	190	176	233	206	243	1280	204	227	225	226	228	199	1308	2589	4 Q	167	202	191	209	218	224	227	161	1659	4248	4 Q	Johnson (USA); W 258-181	Pluhowsky (USA); L 212–223	2nd place, silver medalist(s)
Ana Henriquez	Women's	200	216	205	203	174	167	1165	180	161	191	218	201	231	1182	2347	15	Did not advance													

Pairs

Athlete	Event	Block 1 (Games 1–6)								Block 2 (Games 7–12)								Grand total	Final Rank
Athlete	Event	1	2	3	4	5	6	Total	Average	7	8	9	10	11	12	Total	Average	Grand total	Final Rank
Manuel Fernández; Alex Prats	Men's	175	182	130	192	243	220	1142	190.3	206	170	238	209	289	192	2446	203.8	4973	7
Manuel Fernández; Alex Prats	Men's	200	213	203	193	191	223	1223	203.8	237	139	215	279	249	185	2527	210.6	4973	7
Aura Guerra; Ana Henriquez	Women's	158	214	202	171	165	214	1124	187.3	200	216	210	223	170	211	2354	196.2	4784	5
Aura Guerra; Ana Henriquez	Women's	215	184	179	182	195	190	1145	190.8	224	215	195	192	222	237	2430	202.5	4784	5

== Boxing ==
Men

Athlete	Event	Preliminaries	Quarterfinals	Semifinals	Final
Athlete	Event	Opposition Result	Opposition Result	Opposition Result	Opposition Result
Víctor Santillan	Light flyweight	—N/a	Zarate (ARG); W 3–0	Velázquez (MEX); L 0-3 (bronze)	Did not advance
Leonel de los Santos	Flyweight	Vargas (USA); L 1–2	Did not advance		
Héctor García	Bantamweight	—N/a	Gutiérrez (NCA); W 3–0	Martínez (USA); W 3–0	Cruz (CUB); L 0-3 (silver)
Elvis Rodríguez	Lightweight	Cabrera Machado (VEN); W 3–0	Álvarez (CUB); L 0–3	Did not advance	
Juan Ramón Solano	Welterweight	—N/a	Silva (NCA); W 3–0	Maestre (VEN); L 0-3 (bronze)	Did not advance
Raúl Sánchez	Middleweight	Cotto (PUR); W 3–0	Vivas (COL); L 1–2	Did not advance	
Joaquín Berroa	Heavyweight	—N/a	Savón (CUB); L 0–3	Did not advance	

Women

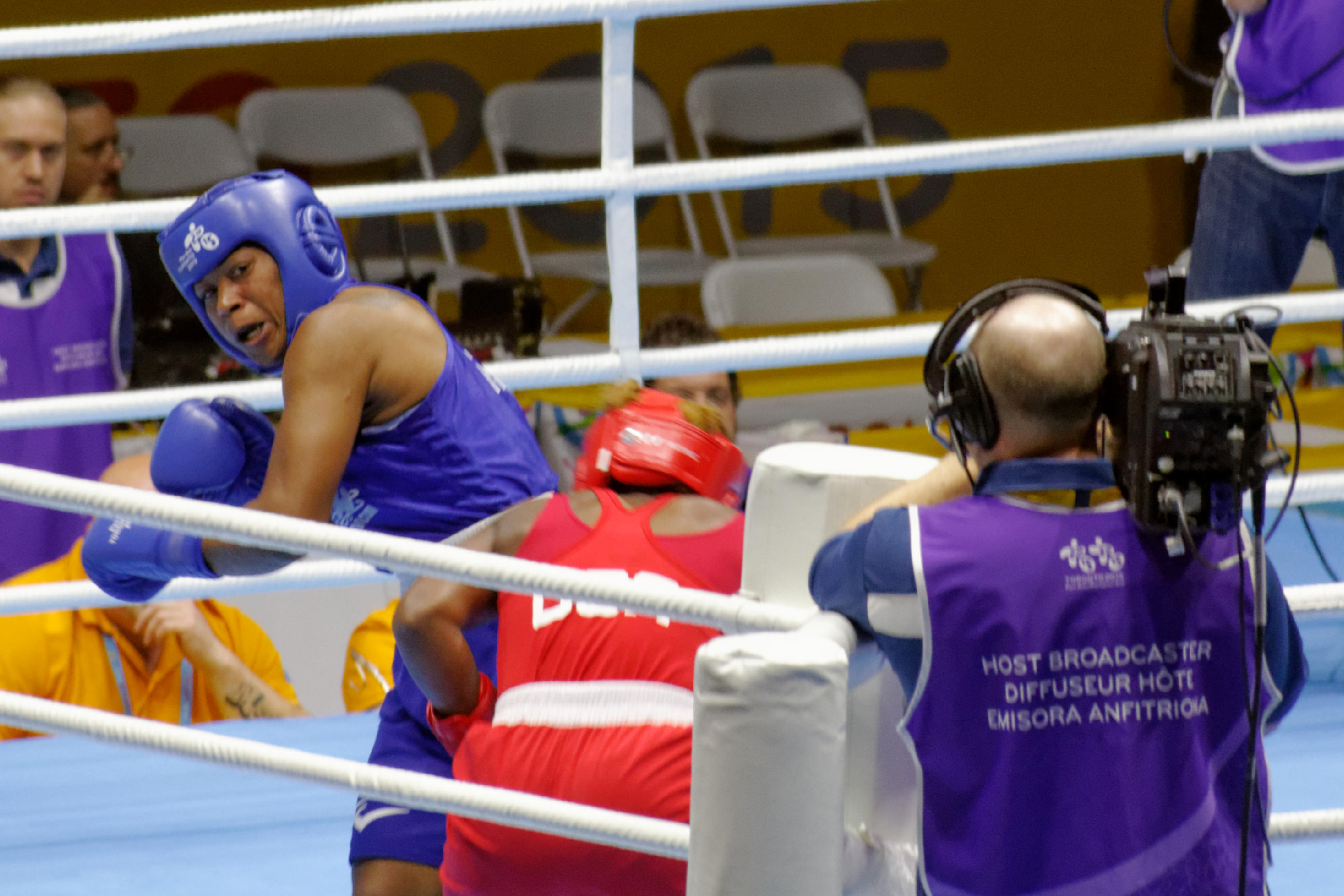
Yenebier Guillén (in blue) facing Claressa Shields in the gold medal match

Athlete	Event	Quarterfinals	Semifinals	Final
Athlete	Event	Opposition Result	Opposition Result	Opposition Result
Mirquin Sena	Light welterweight	Herrera (ESA); W 2-1	Veyre (CAN); L 0-2 (bronze)	Did not advance
Yenebier Guillén	Light heavyweight	Taylor (TTO); W TKO R2 1:20	Fortin (CAN); W 2-0	Shields (USA); L 0-4 (silver)

== Canoeing ==
=== Sprint ===
The Dominican Republic received one wildcard in men's canoeing.

Men

Athlete	Event	Heats		Semifinals		Final	
Athlete	Event	Time	Rank	Time	Rank	Time	Rank
Ariel Jimenéz	C-1 200 m	44.923	4 SF	45.333	3 F	45.145	9
Ariel Jimenéz	C-1 1000 m	Bye				4:55.629	7

Qualification Legend: QF = Qualify to final; QS = Qualify to semifinal

== Cycling ==
Road cycling
Men

Athlete	Event	Final	
Athlete	Event	Time	Rank
Diego Milán	Road race	3:46:35	10
William Guzmán	Road race	3:52:04	28

== Diving ==
The Dominican Republic qualified one male diver.

Men

Athlete	Event	Semifinals		Final	
Athlete	Event	Points	Rank	Points	Rank
Frandiel Gómez	3 m springboard	311.05	16	Did not advance	
Frandiel Gómez	10 m platform	234.15	15	Did not advance	

== Equestrian ==
The Dominican Republic has qualified an athlete.

Dressage

Argentina has qualified a full dressage team.

Athlete	Horse	Event	Grand Prix		Grand Prix Special		Grand Prix Freestyle	
Athlete	Horse	Event	Score	Rank	Score	Rank	Score	Rank
Yvonne Losos de Muñiz	Foco Loco W	Individual	Eliminated		Did not advance			

Jumping

The Dominican Republic has qualified two athletes.

Individual

Athlete	Horse	Event	Round 1		Round 2			Round 3			Final					
Athlete	Horse	Event	Round 1		Round 2			Round 3			Round A		Round B		Total	
Athlete	Horse	Event	Penalties	Rank	Penalties	Total	Rank	Penalties	Total	Rank	Penalties	Rank	Penalties	Rank	Penalties	Rank
Manuel Fernández	Al Calypso	Individual	4	=33	1	5	=17 Q	0	5	=9 Q	20	30	Did not advance			
Héctor Florentino	Allure G	Individual	0	=1	10	10	32 Q	5	15	=30 Q	8	=12 Q	4	15	Did not advance	

== Fencing ==
The Dominican Republic has qualified 6 female fencers.

Women

Athlete	Event	Pool Round		Round of 16	Quarterfinals	Semifinals	Final / BM	
Athlete	Event	Result	Seed	Opposition Score	Opposition Score	Opposition Score	Opposition Score	Rank
Elsa Mateo	Épée	2 V – 3 D	4th Q	María Martínez (VEN); L 9-15	Did not advance			
Violeta Ramírez	Épée	3 V – 2 D	3rd Q	Dirley Yepes (CRC); W 15-12	Yamirka Ramírez (CUB); W 15-14	María Martínez (VEN); W 15-10	Katharine Holmes (USA); L 14-15	2nd place, silver medalist(s)
Elsa Mateo; Violeta Ramírez; Elisa Bocchia	Épée Team	—N/a			United States; L 33-45	5th-8th place match Mexico; W 45-38	5th-6th place match Brazil; L 37-45	6th
Heyddys Valentín	Sabre	2 V – 3 D	12th Q	Dagmara Wozniak (USA); L 8-15	Did not advance			
Rossy Félix	Sabre	4 V – 1 D	3rd Q	Jennifer Morales (CUB); W 15-10	María Pérez (ARG); L 6-15	Did not advance		
Heyddys Valentín; Rossy Félix; Maybelline Johnnson	Sabre Team	—N/a			Venezuela; L 36-45	5th-8th place match Brazil; L 41-45	7th-8th place match El Salvador; W 45-29	7th

== Field hockey ==
The Dominican Republic has qualified a women's team, of 16 athletes.

Women's tournament

Team

The Dominican Republic field hockey women's team that will compete at the 2015 Pan American Games:

- Agustina Birocho
- Yarinet de la Cruz
- Cindy de la Rosa
- Teresa de la Rosa
- Soledad del Pino
- María Disanti
- Yenny León
- Albania Marte
- Benifer Moronta
- Lucía Navamuel
- Cecilia Oflaherti
- Magalys Ortega
- Nayrobi Pichardo
- Daneiry Rivas
- Julieta Roncati
- Norma Sánchez

Pool A

Pos	Team	Pld	W	D	L	GF	GA	GD	Pts	Qualification
1	Argentina	3	3	0	0	26	0	+26	9	Quarterfinals
2	Canada	3	2	0	1	16	6	+10	6	Quarterfinals
3	Mexico	3	0	1	2	1	14	−13	1	Quarterfinals
4	Dominican Republic	3	0	1	2	2	25	−23	1	Quarterfinals

Source: FIH
Rules for classification: 1) points; 2) goal difference; 3) goals scored; 4) head-to-head result.

13 July 2015
19:00

Canada	12–1	Dominican Republic
Norlander 10', 18', 51'; Gillis 11', 26', 40'; Johansen 14', 43'; Secco 22'; Hennig 38', 55'; Culley 53'	Report	Moronta Perez 26'

Umpires:
Michelle Joubert (RSA)
Nur Hafizah Azman (MAS)

15 July 2015
17:00

Mexico	1–1	Dominican Republic
Sánchez 35'	Report	Oflaherti Paganini 26'

Umpires:
Meghan McLennan (CAN)
Soledad Iparraguirre (ARG)

17 July 2015
17:00

Argentina	12–0	Dominican Republic
Barrionuevo 4', 12'; Albertarrio 15'; Romang 18', 29'; Sánchez Moccia 19', 48'; Rodríguez 24'; Merino 27'; Ortiz 31'; Gomes Fantasia 32'; Molina 59'	Report

Umpires:
Camila Cabargas (CHI)
Stephanie Judefind (USA)

Quarterfinal

20 July 2015
17:00

United States	15–0	Dominican Republic
Selenski 9'; Kasold 15'; Kolojejchick 18', 28', 32', 36'; Witmer 20', 55'; O'Donnell 26', 60'; K. Reinprecht 33'; Dawson 35'; Fee 40'; González 43'; Falgowski 46'	Report

Umpires:
Verónica Villafañe (ARG)
Megan Robertson (CAN)

Classification semifinal

22 July 2015
11:30

Uruguay	7–1	Dominican Republic
Norbis 13', 20'; Casarotti 31'; Coates 36'; Vilar del Valle 48', 50'; Stanley 49'	Report	Ortega Mateo 17'

Umpires:
Stephanie Judefind (USA)
Megan Robertson (CAN)

Seventh place match

24 July 2015
09:00

Cuba	1–2	Dominican Republic
Vera 59'	Report	Ortega Mateo 19'; Oflaherti Paganini 34'

Umpires:
Nur Hafizah Azman (MAS)
Verónica Villafañe (ARG)

2015 Pan American Games 7th

Dominican Republic

== Gymnastics ==
Artistic

The Dominican Republic qualified 2 athletes.

Men
Individual Qualification

Athlete	Event	Qualification							
Athlete	Event	Apparatus						Total	Rank
Athlete	Event	F	PH	R	V	PB	HB	Total	Rank
Audrys Nin	Qualification	13.100 (27)	—N/a	—N/a	13.875	—N/a	14.650	41.550	49

Qualification Legend: Q = Qualified to apparatus final

Women
Individual Qualification

Athlete	Event	Qualification					
Athlete	Event	Apparatus				Total	Rank
Athlete	Event	V	UB	BB	F	Total	Rank
Yamilet Peña	Qualification	15.100 (2) Q	10.900 (40)	10.150 (42)	12.300 (30)	48.450	23

Qualification Legend: Q = Qualified to apparatus final

Individual finals

Athlete	Event	Apparatus				Total	Rank
Athlete	Event	V	UB	BB	F	Total	Rank
Yamilet Peña	Vault	14.250	—N/a			14.250	2nd place, silver medalist(s)

== Handball ==
Dominican Republic has qualified a men's team of 15 athletes.

Men's tournament

The Dominican Republic handball men's team that will compete at the 2015 Pan American Games:

Head coach: (Dominican Republic) Jose Neninger

No.	Pos.	Name	Date of birth (age)	Height	App.	Goals	Club
1	GK	Erick Montero	23 March 1988 (age 38)				(Spain) CH Pardinyes Lleida
2	LB	Kelvin de Leon	5 October 1978 (age 47)		90		(Spain) CH Pardinyes Lleida
3	RW	Leony de Leon	5 December 1976 (age 49)		85		(Spain) CH Pardinyes Lleida
4	CB	Erinson Tavarez	15 January 1989 (age 37)				(Spain) CH Pardinyes Lleida
5	LW	Luis Taveras	21 April 1978 (age 48)		60		(Spain) CH Alcarras
7	LW	Luis Objio	5 May 1986 (age 40)				(Spain) CH Pardinyes Lleida
8	P	Franalbert Aybar	30 December 1980 (age 45)		25		(Spain) CH Pardinyes Lleida
9	LB	Geraldo Diaz	5 May 1990 (age 36)				(Spain) CH Pardinyes Lleida
10	P	Elvin Fis Carpio	22 April 1984 (age 42)				(Spain) CH Pardinyes Lleida
11	P	Pablo Jacobo	22 December 1979 (age 46)		50		(Dominican Republic) CH Alcarras
12	GK	Luis Sanlate	5 June 1981 (age 45)				(Spain) CH Pardinyes Lleida
14	LW	Jose Sanchez	11 January 1991 (age 35)				(Spain) CH Pardinyes Lleida
16	GK	Irvin Escoto	12 March 1986 (age 40)				(Spain) CH Pardinyes Lleida
18	LB	Dioris Matteo	6 December 1986 (age 39)		70		(Argentina) Konig Trade Balmazuj
22	LW	Willibert de la Rosa	4 May 1993 (age 33)				(Spain) CH Pardinyes Lleida

Group A

Team	Pld	W	D	L	GF	GA	GD	Pts	Qualification
Brazil	3	3	0	0	120	53	+67	6	Qualified for the semifinals
Uruguay	3	2	0	1	77	78	−1	4	Qualified for the semifinals
Canada	3	1	0	2	62	85	−23	2	
Dominican Republic	3	0	0	3	66	109	−43	0	

July 17; 13:30	Dominican Republic	23–33	Uruguay	Exhibition Centre – Hall B Referees: Gjeding, Hansen (DEN)
July 17; 13:30	Mateo 6	(12–13)	Fabra 5	Exhibition Centre – Hall B Referees: Gjeding, Hansen (DEN)
July 17; 13:30	2× (yellow card) 8× (suspension)	report	2× (yellow card) 4× (suspension)	Exhibition Centre – Hall B Referees: Gjeding, Hansen (DEN)

July 19; 13:30	Canada	28–25	Dominican Republic	Exhibition Centre – Hall B Referees: Pinto, Menezes (BRA)
July 19; 13:30	Bessette 11	(12–14)	Mateo 9	Exhibition Centre – Hall B Referees: Pinto, Menezes (BRA)
July 19; 13:30	2× (yellow card) 5× (suspension)	report	4× (yellow card) 6× (suspension)	Exhibition Centre – Hall B Referees: Pinto, Menezes (BRA)

July 21; 13:30	Brazil	48–18	Dominican Republic	Exhibition Centre – Hall B Referees: Guzman, Perez (PUR)
July 21; 13:30	Chiuffa 10	(30–7)	Mateo 7	Exhibition Centre – Hall B Referees: Guzman, Perez (PUR)
July 21; 13:30	2× (yellow card) 2× (suspension)	Report	2× (yellow card) 1× (suspension)	Exhibition Centre – Hall B Referees: Guzman, Perez (PUR)

== Judo ==
The Dominican Republic has qualified a team of eight judokas (four men and four women).

Men

Athlete	Event	Round of 16	Quarterfinals	Semifinals	Repechage	Final / BM	
Athlete	Event	Opposition Result	Opposition Result	Opposition Result	Opposition Result	Opposition Result	Rank
Abel Montero	−60 kg	Sergio Pessoa (CAN); L 000S1-101S2	Did not advance				
Wander Mateo	−66 kg	BYE	Sergio Mattey (VEN); L 000S1-010S3	Did not advance	Gustavo Lopez Aguilera (ESA); W 000-100	Carlos Tondique (CUB); L 010S1-000S1	5
Lwilli Santana	−73 kg	BYE	Magdiel Estrada (CUB); L 001-001S3	Did not advance	Arthur Margelidon (CAN); L 000S1-100S1	Did not advance	7
Cristhian Gomera	−90 kg	Nelson Martínez (VEN); L 001S2-001S1	Did not advance				

Women

Athlete	Event	Round of 16	Quarterfinals	Semifinals	Repechage	Final / BM	
Athlete	Event	Opposition Result	Opposition Result	Opposition Result	Opposition Result	Opposition Result	Rank
Isandrina Sánchez	−48 kg	Erin Morgan (CAN); W 000-111	Paula Pareto (ARG); L 000-100	Did not advance	Andrea Gómez (VEN); W 000S1-100	Edna Carrillo (MEX); L 001S1-000	5
María García	−52 kg	BYE	Érika Miranda (BRA); L 000-100	Did not advance	Abi Cardozo (ARG); W 000-101	Angélica Delgado (USA); L 000S2-000	5
Luisa Jiménez	−57 kg	Aliuska Ojeda (CUB); L 000S2-000S1	Did not advance				
Leidi Germán	+78 kg	BYE	Nina Cutro-Kelly (USA); L 000-101S1	Did not advance	Kenia Rodríguez (CRC); W 000S3-000	María Altheman (BRA); L 000-100	5

== Karate ==
The Dominican Republic has qualified 9 athletes.

Men

Athlete	Event	Round robin				Semifinals	Final	
Athlete	Event	Opposition Result	Opposition Result	Opposition Result	Rank	Opposition Result	Opposition Result	Rank
Norberto Sosa	–60 kg	Martínez (VEN); L 0–6	Chung (CAN); L 1–1	Miyazaki (USA); L 0–8	4th	Did not advance		7th
Deivis Ferreras	–67 kg	Madera (VEN); W 2–1	Ramírez (COL); W 3–0	Vargas (MEX); 0–0	1st	Noriega (CUB); W 8–0	Pinzas (ARG); L 2–2	Silver
Dionicio Gustavo	–75 kg	Nicastro (VEN); 5–5	Boily-Martineau (CAN); 0–0	Landázuri (COL); L 2–3	4th	Did not advance		
Anel Castillo	+84 kg	Mina (ECU); W 11–6	de Sousa (CAN); W 9–2	Barbosa (BRA); 0-0	1st	Irr (USA); W 5–5	Mina (ECU); L 2–6	Silver

Women

Athlete	Event	Round robin				Semifinals	Final	
Athlete	Event	Opposition Result	Opposition Result	Opposition Result	Rank	Opposition Result	Opposition Result	Rank
Ana Villanueva	–50 kg	Huamani (PER); 0–0	Campos (VEN); W 2–1	Virk (CAN); 0–0	2nd	Souza (BRA); W 2–1	Bruna (CHI); W 5–0	Gold
Leidi León	–55 kg	Kumizaki (BRA); 0–0	Campbell (CAN); 0–0	Navarrete (VEN); L 0–2	4th	Did not advance		7th
Karina Díaz	–61 kg	Grande (PER); 4–4	Factos (ECU); L 3–4	Desjardins (CAN); W 3–1	2nd	Arreola (MEX); W 2–1	Grande (PER); L 3–4	Silver
Carmen Harrigan	–68 kg	Lazo (ECU); L 3–4	Brozulatto (BRA); 2–2	Kurita (USA); W 5–1	3rd	Did not advance		5th
Karina Pérez	+68 kg	dos Santos (BRA); L 0–7	Boisvenue (CAN); L 2–5	Martínez (CUB); W 5–4	3rd	Did not advance		5th

== Modern pentathlon ==
Dominican Republic has qualified a team of 2 male athletes.

Men

Athlete	Event	Fencing (Épée One Touch)			Swimming (200m Freestyle)			Riding (Show Jumping)			Shooting/Running (10 m Air Pistol/3000m)			Total Points	Final Rank
Athlete	Event	Results	Rank	MP Points	Time	Rank	MP Points	Penalties	Rank	MP Points	Time	Rank	MP Points	Total Points	Final Rank
Fernando Rodríguez	Men's	12V – 16D	21st	186	2:31.98	26th	245	99.52	EL	0	16:20.27	28th	320	751	28th
Alex Hernández	Men's	9V – 19D	25th	162	2:22.32	23rd	274	70.43	10th	277	15:11.78	25th	389	1110	21st

== Roller sports ==
The Dominican Republic has qualified two athletes.

Figure skating

Athlete	Event	Short Program		Long Program	
Athlete	Event	Result	Rank	Result	Rank
Anthony Payamps	Men's free skating	95.10	8	95.60	7

Speed Skating

Men

Athlete	Event	Quarterfinals		Semifinals		Final Time	Rank
Athlete	Event	Time	Rank	Time	Rank	Final Time	Rank
Mauricio García	200 m time-trial	—N/a					DNS
Mauricio García	500 m	39.358	4	Did not advance			
Mauricio García	Men's 10,000 m	—N/a				4	7

== Racquetball ==
The Dominican Republic has qualified a team of two men.

Men

Athlete	Event	Pool play				Round of 32	Round of 16	Quarterfinals	Semifinals	Final	
Athlete	Event	Opposition Result	Opposition Result	Opposition Result	Rank	Opposition Result	Opposition Result	Opposition Result	Opposition Result	Opposition Result	Rank
Luis Pérez	Singles	Castillo (VEN); W 15–7, 15–9	Cubillos (COL); W 13–15, 15–10, 11–2	Bredenbeck (USA); L 7–15, 2–15	Acuña (CRC); W 15–12, 9–15, 11–4	Carson (USA); L 8–15, 1–15	Did not advance				
Ramón de León	Singles	Green (CAN); L 4–15, 7–15	Herrera (COL); L 12–15, 15–10, 9-11	Beltrán (MEX); L 9–15, 4–15	Wer (MEX); W 15–12, 8–15, 11–9	Carson (USA); L 2–15, 4–15	Did not advance				
Luis Pérez; Ramón de León	Doubles	Castillo; Castro (VEN); L 10–15, 8-15	Moscoso; Keller (BOL); L 9–15, 12–15	Galicia; Wer (GUA); W 15–11, 15–8	Fumero; Camacho (CRC); W 0–15, 15–14, 11–8	—N/a	Beltrán; Moreno (MEX); L 6–15, 10–15	Did not advance			
Luis Pérez; Ramón de León	Team	—N/a					Bye	Canada; L 11–15, 7-15	Did not advance		

== Shooting ==
The Dominican Republic has qualified eight shooters.

Men

Athlete	Event	Qualification		Final	
Athlete	Event	Points	Rank	Points	Rank
Josué Hernández	10 m air pistol	559	22	Did not advance	
Josué Hernández	25 m rapid fire pistol				DNS
Josué Hernández	50 m pistol	504	24	Did not advance	
Hosman Duran	10 m air rifle	546.7	21	Did not advance	
Hosman Duran	50 m rifle prone	612.6	15	Did not advance	
Hosman Duran	50 m rifle 3 position	1087	22	Did not advance	

Match shooting

Athlete	Event	Qualification		Semifinal		Final / BM	
Athlete	Event	Points	Rank	Points	Rank	Opposition Result	Rank
Domingo Nicolás Lorenzo	Trap	116	2 Q	9	6	Did not advance	
Eduardo Lorenzo	Trap	103	16	Did not advance			
Sergio Piñero	Double trap	129	3 Q	28	1 Q	26	2nd place, silver medalist(s)
Elvin Rodgers	Double trap	128	4 Q	23	6	Did not advance	
Félix Hermida	Skeet	110	25	Did not advance			
Julio Dujarric	Skeet	117	12	Did not advance			

Women

Athlete	Event	Qualification		Final	
Athlete	Event	Points	Rank	Points	Rank
Rosario Piña	10 m air pistol	356	22	Did not advance	
Rosario Piña	25 m pistol	537	20	Did not advance	
Yubelka Nouel	10 m air rifle	391.3	27	Did not advance	
Yubelka Nouel	50 m rifle 3 position	554	24	Did not advance	

== Softball ==
The Dominican Republic has qualified both a men's and women's teams. Each team will consist of 15 athletes for a total of 30.

=== Men's tournament ===
Team

The Dominican Republic was represented by the following athletes:

- Randy Álvarez
- Melvin Batista
- José Bueno
- Melvin Cruz
- Julio Díaz
- Santiago Díaz
- Pablo Figuereo
- Sergio la Hoz
- Luis Martínez
- Freddy Moreta
- Juan Núñez
- Yennier Pérez
- Wilton Robles
- Stalin Rosario
- Engel Santana

Group A

Team	Pld	W	L	RF	RA	RD	Qualification
Canada	5	5	0	33	13	+20	Qualified for the semifinals
Argentina	5	3	2	19	15	+4	Qualified for the semifinals
Venezuela	5	3	2	14	10	+4	Qualified for the semifinals
United States	5	2	3	16	10	+6	Qualified for the semifinals
Mexico	5	2	3	16	22	−6	
Dominican Republic	5	0	5	5	33	−28	

12 July 2015; 10:00	Dominican Republic	0–10	United States	President’s Choice Ajax Pan Am Ballpark, Ajax; Attendance: 1,010
12 July 2015; 10:00		Boxscore		President’s Choice Ajax Pan Am Ballpark, Ajax; Attendance: 1,010

13 July 2015; 16:30	Venezuela	5–1	Dominican Republic	President’s Choice Ajax Pan Am Ballpark, Ajax; Attendance: 129
13 July 2015; 16:30		Boxscore		President’s Choice Ajax Pan Am Ballpark, Ajax; Attendance: 129

14 July 2015; 16:30	Dominican Republic	2–4	Mexico	President’s Choice Ajax Pan Am Ballpark, Ajax; Attendance: 363
14 July 2015; 16:30		Boxscore		President’s Choice Ajax Pan Am Ballpark, Ajax; Attendance: 363

15 July 2015; 19:00	Canada	7–2	Dominican Republic	President’s Choice Ajax Pan Am Ballpark, Ajax; Attendance: 632
15 July 2015; 19:00		Boxscore		President’s Choice Ajax Pan Am Ballpark, Ajax; Attendance: 632

16 July 2015; 14:00	Dominican Republic	0–7	Argentina	President’s Choice Ajax Pan Am Ballpark, Ajax; Attendance: 340
16 July 2015; 14:00		Boxscore		President’s Choice Ajax Pan Am Ballpark, Ajax; Attendance: 340

=== Women's tournament ===
Team

The Dominican Republic participated with the following athletes:

- Karina de los Santos
- Dhariana Familia
- Geraldida Féliz
- Yanela Gómez
- Yuderca Matos
- Josefina Mercedes
- Geovanny Núñez
- Luisa Nuñez
- Danelis Ramírez
- Eduarda Rocha
- Lidizeth Soto
- Aureliza Tejada
- María Toribio
- Anabel Ulloa
- Elizabeth Vicioso

Group A

Team	Pld	W	L	RF	RA	RD	Qualification
United States	5	5	0	43	4	+39	Qualified for the semifinals
Canada	5	4	1	21	14	+7	Qualified for the semifinals
Puerto Rico	5	3	2	18	17	+1	Qualified for the semifinals
Brazil	5	2	3	7	19	−12	Qualified for the semifinals
Cuba	5	1	4	10	23	−13	
Dominican Republic	5	0	5	14	36	−22	

19 July 2015; 14:00	Dominican Republic	1 – 3	Cuba	President’s Choice Ajax Pan Am Ballpark, Ajax; Attendance: 2,895
19 July 2015; 14:00		Boxscore		President’s Choice Ajax Pan Am Ballpark, Ajax; Attendance: 2,895

20 July 2015; 16:30	Puerto Rico	11 – 5	Dominican Republic	President’s Choice Ajax Pan Am Ballpark, Ajax; Attendance: 375
20 July 2015; 16:30		Boxscore		President’s Choice Ajax Pan Am Ballpark, Ajax; Attendance: 375

21 July 2015; 16:30	Brazil	2 – 1	Dominican Republic	President’s Choice Ajax Pan Am Ballpark, Ajax; Attendance: 2,900
21 July 2015; 16:30		Boxscore		President’s Choice Ajax Pan Am Ballpark, Ajax; Attendance: 2,900

22 July 2015; 19:00	Canada	9 – 7	Dominican Republic	President’s Choice Ajax Pan Am Ballpark, Ajax; Attendance: 1,200
22 July 2015; 19:00		Boxscore		President’s Choice Ajax Pan Am Ballpark, Ajax; Attendance: 1,200

23 July 2015; 14:00	Dominican Republic	0 – 11	United States	President’s Choice Ajax Pan Am Ballpark, Ajax; Attendance: 112
23 July 2015; 14:00		Boxscore		President’s Choice Ajax Pan Am Ballpark, Ajax; Attendance: 112

== Table tennis ==
The Dominican Republic has qualified a men's and women's team.

Men

Athlete	Event	Group stage				Round of 32	Round of 16	Quarterfinals	Semifinals	Final / BM	
Athlete	Event	Opposition Result	Opposition Result	Opposition Result	Rank	Opposition Result	Opposition Result	Opposition Result	Opposition Result	Opposition Result	Rank
Emil Santos	Singles	Miguel Lara (MEX); L 1 – 4	Eugene Wang (CAN); L 0 – 4	Diego Rodríguez (PER); L 1 – 4	3	Did not advance					
Samuel Galvez	Singles	Pierre-Luc Thériault (CAN); L 0 – 4	Gustavo Gómez (CHI); L 3 – 4	Andy Pereira (CUB); L 0 – 4	4	Did not advance					
Isaac Vila	Singles	Felipe Olivares (CHI); L 0 – 4	Jimmy Butler (USA); W 4 – 0	Hugo Calderano (BRA); L 0 – 4	3	Did not advance					
Emil Santos; Samuel Galvez; Isaac Vila	Team	Argentina; L 0-3	Mexico; L 2-3	Did not advance							9

Women

Athlete	Event	Group stage				Round of 32	Round of 16	Quarterfinals	Semifinals	Final / BM	
Athlete	Event	Opposition Result	Opposition Result	Opposition Result	Rank	Opposition Result	Opposition Result	Opposition Result	Opposition Result	Opposition Result	Rank
Eva Brito	Singles	Wu Yue (USA); L 0 – 4	Yadira Silva (MEX); L 0 – 4	Andrea Estrada (GUA); W 4 – 1	3	Did not advance					
Johenny Valdez	Singles	Paula Medina (COL); L 2 – 4	Janina Nieto (PER); W 4 – 2	Ana Codina (ARG); W 4 – 3	2 Q	Jiaqi Zheng (USA); L 0 – 4	Did not advance				17
Yasiris Ortiz	Singles	Gremlis Arvelo (VEN); L 1 – 4	Gabriela Soto (PER); L 3 – 4	Luo Anqi (CAN); L 3 – 4	4	Did not advance					
Eva Brito; Johenny Valdez; Yasiris Ortiz	Team	United States; L 0-3	Argentina; L 0-3	Did not advance							9

== Taekwondo ==
The Dominican Republic has qualified a team of six athletes (three men and three women).

Athlete	Event	Round of 16	Quarterfinals	Semifinals	Repechage	Bronze medal	Final	
Athlete	Event	Opposition Result	Opposition Result	Opposition Result	Opposition Result	Opposition Result	Opposition Result	Rank
Luisito Pie	Men's -58kg	Lucas Guzman (ARG); W 8 – 6	Mario Leal (VEN); W 14 – 13	John Maduro (ARU); W 4 – 3	—N/a		Carlos Navarro (MEX); L 7– 8	2nd place, silver medalist(s)
Moisés Hernández	Men's -80kg	Neyder Lozano (COL); W 9 – 4	Chris Iliesco (CAN); W 7 – 4	Steven López (USA); W 3 – 2	—N/a		José Cobas (CUB); L 9– 10	2nd place, silver medalist(s)
Víctor Feliz	Men's +80kg	Misael Lopez (MEX); L 5– 18	Did not advance					
Candelaria Marte	Women's -49kg	Cyriesse Hall (JAM); W 12 – 2	Itzel Manjarrez (MEX); L 3– 10	Did not advance	Bye	Elizabeth Zamora (GUA); W 8 – 7	Did not advance	3rd place, bronze medalist(s)
Disnansi Polanco	Women's -57kg	Evelyn Gonda (CAN); L 1– 13	Did not advance					
Katherine Rodríguez	Women's +67kg	Raphaella Galacho (BRA); L 2– 4	Did not advance					

== Tennis ==
Singles

Athlete	Event	Round of 64	Round of 32	Round of 16	Quarterfinals	Semifinals	Final / BM	
Athlete	Event	Opposition Score	Opposition Score	Opposition Score	Opposition Score	Opposition Score	Opposition Score	Rank
Roberto Cid Subervi	Men's	Zormann (BRA); W 6–4, 2–6, 7–5	Polansky (CAN); W 6–2, 7–5	Podlipnik (CHI); L 3–6, 7–5, 3–6	Did not advance			9th
Francesca Segarelli	Women's	Álvarez (BOL); L 6–3, 2–6, 6-7	Did not advance					

Doubles

Athlete	Event	Round of 16	Quarterfinals	Semifinals	Final / BM	
Athlete	Event	Opposition Score	Opposition Score	Opposition Score	Opposition Score	Rank
Roberto Cid Subervi; Francesca Segarelli	Mixed	Galeano / Cepede (PAR); L 4–6, 7–5, 5-10	Did not advance			

== Volleyball ==
The Dominican Republic has qualified a women's team of 12 athletes.

Women's tournament

=== Team ===
- Annerys Vargas
- Marianne Fersola
- Brenda Castillo
- Camil Domínguez
- Niverka Marte
- Prisilla Rivera
- Yonkaira Peña
- Gina Mambru
- Bethania de la Cruz
- Ana Binet
- Brayelin Martínez
- Jineiry Martínez

=== Standings ===
Pos	Team	Pld	W	L	Pts	SPW	SPL	SPR	SW	SL	SR
1	Dominican Republic	3	2	1	10	261	215	1.214	7	4	1.750
2	Argentina	3	2	1	10	252	254	0.992	7	4	1.750
3	Cuba	3	1	2	5	248	259	0.958	4	7	0.571
4	Canada	3	1	2	5	228	261	0.874	4	7	0.571

Source: Archived 2015-10-20 at the Wayback Machine

=== Preliminary round ===
Date		Score		Set 1	Set 2	Set 3	Set 4	Set 5	Total	Report
Jul 16	Canada	0–3	Dominican Republic	15–25	13–25	15–25			43–75	P2P3
Jul 18	Dominican Republic	3–1	Argentina	22–25	25–11	25–22	25-18		97–76	P2P3
Jul 20	Dominican Republic	1–3	Cuba	22–25	22–25	25–21	20-25		89–96	P2P3

=== Semifinals ===
Date		Score		Set 1	Set 2	Set 3	Set 4	Set 5	Total	Report
Jul 23	Dominican Republic	1–3	United States	17–25	25–22	18–25	22-25		82–97	P2 P3

=== Bronze medal match ===
Date		Score		Set 1	Set 2	Set 3	Set 4	Set 5	Total	Report
Jul 25	Puerto Rico	1–3	Dominican Republic (bronze)	22–25	22–25	25–22	21–25		90–97	P2 P3

2015 Pan American Games 3rd place

Dominican Republic

== Water skiing ==
Athlete	Event	Preliminary		Final	
Athlete	Event	Score	Rank	Score	Rank
Robert Pigozzi	Men's slalom	11.25	6th Q	14.25	8th

== Weightlifting ==
The Dominican Republic has qualified a team of 12 athletes (4 men and 6 women).

Men

Athlete	Event	Snatch		Clean & jerk		Total	Rank
Athlete	Event	Result	Rank	Result	Rank	Total	Rank
Luis García	Men's 56 kg	115	3	141	3	325	3rd place, bronze medalist(s)
Jonathan de la Cruz	Men's 69 kg	130	=6	163	6	293	7
Juan Peña Mejía	Men's 77 kg	144	6	180	=4	324	5
José Familia	Men's 105 kg						DNF

Women

Athlete	Event	Snatch		Clean & jerk		Total	Rank
Athlete	Event	Result	Rank	Result	Rank	Total	Rank
Cándida Vásquez	Women's 48 kg	81 PR	1	100	2	181 PR	1st place, gold medalist(s)
Beatriz Pirón	Women's 48 kg	80	2	95	3	175	3rd place, bronze medalist(s)
Yafreisy Silvestre	Women's 53 kg	80	5	103	3	183	3rd place, bronze medalist(s)
Yuderqui Contreras	Women's 53 kg						DNF
Yineisy Reyes	Women's 58 kg	92	3				DNF
Verónica Saladin	Women's +75 kg	115	=2				DNF

== Wrestling ==
The Dominican Republic has qualified a team of 3 athletes.

Men's freestyle

Athlete	Event	Preliminaries	Quarterfinals	Semifinals	Final
Athlete	Event	Opposition Result	Opposition Result	Opposition Result	Opposition Result
Luis Miguel Pérez	86 kg	Bye	Pool Ambrosio (PER); L ST 0 – 4	Did not advance	

Greco-Roman

Athlete	Event	Preliminaries	Quarterfinals	Semifinals	Final
Athlete	Event	Opposition Result	Opposition Result	Opposition Result	Opposition Result
Jansel Ramírez	59 kg	Bye	Andres Montaño (ECU); L PP 1 – 3	Did not advance	Bronze medal match: Spenser Mango (USA); L PP 1 – 3
Josué Encarnación	130 kg	Bye	Luciano del Rio (ARG); W PP 3 – 1	Andrés Ayub (CHI); L PP 1 – 3	Bronze medal match: Charles Thoms (CAN); W PO 3 – 0 (bronze)

== See also ==
- Dominican Republic at the 2016 Summer Olympics
