= Women's épée at the 2017 World Fencing Championships =

2017 World Fencing Championships

- Venue: Arena Leipzig
- Location: Leipzig, Germany
- Dates: 23 July

Medalists
gold medal	Tatyana Gudkova	Russia
silver medal	Ewa Nelip	Poland
bronze medal	Olena Kryvytska	Ukraine
bronze medal	Julia Beljajeva	Estonia

The Women's épée event of the 2017 World Fencing Championships was held on 23 July 2017. The qualification was held on 20 July 2017.

== Draw ==
=== Finals ===
Semi-finals
(Ukraine) Olena Kryvytska	10
(Poland) Ewa Nelip	15
(Russia) Tatyana Gudkova	13
(Estonia) Julia Beljajeva	12

Final
(Poland) Ewa Nelip	9
(Russia) Tatyana Gudkova	11

=== Top half ===
==== Section 1 ====
Round of 64
1	(China) Sun Yiwen	15
64	(Colombia) Saskia van Erven Garcia	6
33	(Japan) Ayaka Shimookawa	15
32	(Germany) Nadine Stahlberg	12
17	(Ukraine) Olena Kryvytska	15
48	(Finland) Anna Salminen	11
49	(Romania) Amalia Tătăran	8
16	(United States) Kelley Hurley	15
9	(South Korea) Shin A-lam	11
56	(China) Zhu Mingye	15
41	(Hungary) Vivien Varnai	15
24	(Switzerland) Pauline Brunner	12
25	(Ukraine) Kseniya Pantelyeyeva	13
40	(France) Coraline Vitalis	15
57	(Israel) Nickol Tal	8
8	(Russia) Tatiana Logunova	10

Round of 32
1	(China) Sun Yiwen	15
33	(Japan) Ayaka Shimookawa	14
17	(Ukraine) Olena Kryvytska	15
16	(United States) Kelley Hurley	11
56	(China) Zhu Mingye	10
41	(Hungary) Vivien Varnai	15
40	(France) Coraline Vitalis	5
8	(Russia) Tatiana Logunova	15

Round of 16
1	(China) Sun Yiwen	13
17	(Ukraine) Olena Kryvytska	15
41	(Hungary) Vivien Varnai	10
8	(Russia) Tatiana Logunova	15

Quarterfinals
17	(Ukraine) Olena Kryvytska	15
8	(Russia) Tatiana Logunova	10

==== Section 2 ====
Round of 64
5	(Tunisia) Sarra Besbes	13
60	(United States) Katharine Holmes	12
37	(Croatia) Ana Mesić	8
28	(Spain) Alejandra Cisneros	15
21	(Estonia) Erika Kirpu	12
44	(Italy) Mara Navarria	15
53	(Israel) Ana London	5
12	(France) Lauren Rembi	15
13	(Poland) Ewa Nelip	15
52	(Argentina) Isabel Di Tella	10
45	(Germany) Beate Christmann	15
20	(Poland) Kamila Pytka	8
29	(Italy) Alberta Santuccio	15
36	(Canada) Leonora Mackinnon	5
61	(Singapore) Lim Victoria Ann Xiu Yan	2
4	(Italy) Rossella Fiamingo	15

Round of 32
5	(Tunisia) Sarra Besbes	15
28	(Spain) Alejandra Cisneros	11
44	(Italy) Mara Navarria	6
12	(France) Lauren Rembi	7
13	(Poland) Ewa Nelip	14
45	(Germany) Beate Christmann	9
29	(Italy) Alberta Santuccio	12
4	(Italy) Rossella Fiamingo	15

Round of 16
5	(Tunisia) Sarra Besbes	8
12	(France) Lauren Rembi	15
13	(Poland) Ewa Nelip	13
4	(Italy) Rossella Fiamingo	12

Quarterfinals
12	(France) Lauren Rembi	5
13	(Poland) Ewa Nelip	15

=== Bottom half ===
==== Section 3 ====
Round of 64
3	(Russia) Violetta Kolobova	15
62	(Hong Kong) Hsieh Kaylin Sin Yan	12
35	(Spain) Dora Kiskapusi	7
30	(France) Auriane Mallo	15
19	(Poland) Magdalena Piekarska	15
46	(Greece) Niki-Katerina Sidiropoulou-Christodoulou	13
51	(Venezuela) Patrizia Piovesan Silva	12
14	(South Korea) Kang Young-mi	13
11	(Estonia) Irina Embrich	15
54	(Russia) Daria Martynyuk	7
43	(Poland) Renata Knapik-Miazga	15
22	(Canada) Malinka Hoppe Montanaro	10
27	(Germany) Monika Sozanska	12
38	(Russia) Tatyana Gudkova	13
59	(Spain) Ines Garcia Rodriguez	6
6	(South Korea) Choi In-jeong	15

Round of 32
3	(Russia) Violetta Kolobova	15
30	(France) Auriane Mallo	10
19	(Poland) Magdalena Piekarska	9
14	(South Korea) Kang Young-mi	10
11	(Estonia) Irina Embrich	12
43	(Poland) Renata Knapik-Miazga	9
38	(Russia) Tatyana Gudkova	15
6	(South Korea) Choi In-jeong	8

Round of 16
3	(Russia) Violetta Kolobova	15
14	(South Korea) Kang Young-mi	7
11	(Estonia) Irina Embrich	8
38	(Russia) Tatyana Gudkova	15

Quarterfinals
3	(Russia) Violetta Kolobova	11
38	(Russia) Tatyana Gudkova	15

==== Section 4 ====
Round of 64
7	(Estonia) Julia Beljajeva	15
58	(Romania) Greta Vereș	10
39	(Italy) Giulia Rizzi	9
26	(South Korea) Song Se-ra	10
23	(United States) Anna van Brummen	12
42	(China) Xu Chengzhi	15
55	(Venezuela) María Martinez	5
10	(Brazil) Nathalie Moellhausen	6
15	(Ukraine) Dzhoan Feybi Bezhura	15
50	(France) Laurence Épée	14
47	(Germany) Alexandra Ndolo	15
18	(United States) Courtney Hurley	8
31	(Estonia) Kristina Kuusk	7
34	(Ukraine) Anfisa Pochkalova	15
63	(Venezuela) Eliana Lugo	10
2	(Hungary) Emese Szász-Kovács	15

Round of 32
7	(Estonia) Julia Beljajeva	14
26	(South Korea) Song Se-ra	10
42	(China) Xu Chengzhi	7
10	(Brazil) Nathalie Moellhausen	3
15	(Ukraine) Dzhoan Feybi Bezhura	2
47	(Germany) Alexandra Ndolo	15
34	(Ukraine) Anfisa Pochkalova	8
2	(Hungary) Emese Szász-Kovács	15

Round of 16
7	(Estonia) Julia Beljajeva	13
42	(China) Xu Chengzhi	12
47	(Germany) Alexandra Ndolo	15
2	(Hungary) Emese Szász-Kovács	14

Quarterfinals
7	(Estonia) Julia Beljajeva	15
47	(Germany) Alexandra Ndolo	9
