= Karate at the 2015 Pan American Games – Men's 67 kg =

Men's 67 kg at the 2015 Pan American Games
- Venue: Mississauga Sports Centre
- Dates: July 24
- Competitors: 8 from 8 nations

Medalists
| Gold medal | Julián Pinzás | Argentina |
| Silver medal | Deivis Ferreras | Dominican Republic |
| Bronze medal | Maikel Noriega | Cuba |
| Bronze medal | Daniel Vargas | Mexico |

The men's 67 kg competition of the karate events at the 2015 Pan American Games in Toronto, Ontario, Canada, was held on July 24 at the Mississauga Sports Centre.

== Schedule ==
All times are Central Standard Time (UTC-6).

| Date | Time | Round |
|---|---|---|
| July 24, 2015 | 14:05 | Pool matches |
| July 24, 2015 | 20:05 | Semifinals |
| July 24, 2015 | 21:05 | Final |

== Results ==
The final results.

Legend

- KK — Forfeit (Kiken)

=== Pool 1 ===
| Athlete | Nation | Pld | W | D | L | Points | | |
| Athlete | Nation | Pld | W | D | L | GF | GA | Diff |
|---|---|---|---|---|---|---|---|---|
| Deivis Ferreras | Dominican Republic | 3 | 2 | 1 | 0 | 5 | 1 | +4 |
| Daniel Vargas | Mexico | 3 | 1 | 2 | 0 | 5 | 2 | +3 |
| Andrés Madera | Venezuela | 3 | 1 | 0 | 2 | 6 | 9 | -3 |
| José Ramírez | Colombia | 3 | 0 | 1 | 2 | 2 | 6 | -4 |

| | Score | |
|---|---|---|
| Deivis Ferreras (DOM) | 2–1 | Andrés Madera (VEN) |
| José Ramírez (COL) | 0–0 | Daniel Vargas (MEX) |
| Deivis Ferreras (DOM) | 3–0 | José Ramírez (COL) |
| Andrés Madera (VEN) | 2–5 | Daniel Vargas (MEX) |
| Deivis Ferreras (DOM) | 0–0 | Daniel Vargas (MEX) |
| Andrés Madera (VEN) | 3–2 | José Ramírez (COL) |

=== Pool 2 ===
| Athlete | Nation | Pld | W | D | L | Points | | |
| Athlete | Nation | Pld | W | D | L | GF | GA | Diff |
|---|---|---|---|---|---|---|---|---|
| Julián Pinzás | Argentina | 3 | 3 | 0 | 0 | 18 | 1 | +17 |
| Maikel Noriega | Cuba | 3 | 2 | 0 | 1 | 15 | 12 | +3 |
| Israel Santana | Chile | 3 | 0 | 1 | 2 | 3 | 12 | -9 |
| Leirick Chung | Canada | 3 | 0 | 1 | 2 | 2 | 13 | -11 |

| | Score | |
|---|---|---|
| Maikel Noriega (CUB) | 1–9 | Julián Pinzás (ARG) |
| Leirick Chung (CAN) | 1–1 | Israel Santana (CHI) |
| Maikel Noriega (CUB) | 8–1 | Leirick Chung (CAN) |
| Julián Pinzás (ARG) | 5–0 | Israel Santana (CHI) |
| Maikel Noriega (CUB) | 6–2 | Israel Santana (CHI) |
| Julián Pinzás (ARG) | 4–0 | Leirick Chung (CAN) |

=== Finals ===
Semifinals
Deivis Ferreras (DOM) | 8
Maikel Noriega (CUB) | 0
Daniel Vargas (MEX) | 0
Julián Pinzás (ARG) | 2

Gold medal match
Deivis Ferreras (DOM) | 2
Julián Pinzás (ARG) | 2
