= Karate at the 2015 Pan American Games – Men's +84 kg =

Men's +84 kg at the 2015 Pan American Games
- Venue: Mississauga Sports Centre
- Dates: July 25
- Competitors: 8 from 8 nations

Medalists
Gold medal	Franklin Mina	Ecuador
Silver medal	Anel Castillo	Dominican Republic
Bronze medal	Jander Tiril	Cuba
Bronze medal	Brian Irr	United States

The men's +84 kg competition of the karate events at the 2015 Pan American Games in Toronto, Ontario, Canada, was held on July 25 at the Mississauga Sports Centre.

== Schedule ==
All times are Central Standard Time (UTC-6).

Date	Time	Round
July 25, 2015	16:05	Pool matches
July 25, 2015	20:47	Semifinals
July 25, 2015	21:46	Final

== Results ==
The final results.

Legend

- KK — Forfeit (Kiken)

=== Pool 1 ===
Athlete	Nation	Pld	W	D	L	Points		
Athlete	Nation	Pld	W	D	L	GF	GA	Diff
Jander Tiril	Cuba	3	2	1	0	19	8	+11
Brian Irr	United States	3	2	1	0	13	4	+9
Ángel Aponte	Venezuela	3	0	1	2	5	9	-4
Franco Recouso	Argentina	3	0	1	2	3	19	-16

	Score	
Brian Irr (USA)	3–3	Jander Tiril (CUB)
Franco Recouso (ARG)	1–1	Ángel Aponte (VEN)
Brian Irr (USA)	8–0	Franco Recouso (ARG)
Jander Tiril (CUB)	6–3	Ángel Aponte (VEN)
Brian Irr (USA)	2–1	Ángel Aponte (VEN)
Jander Tiril (CUB)	10–2	Franco Recouso (ARG)

=== Pool 2 ===
Athlete	Nation	Pld	W	D	L	Points		
Athlete	Nation	Pld	W	D	L	GF	GA	Diff
Anel Castillo	Dominican Republic	3	2	1	0	20	8	+12
Franklin Mina	Ecuador	3	2	0	1	26	15	+11
Christopher de Sousa	Canada	3	1	0	2	11	24	-13
Wellington Barbosa	Brazil	3	0	1	2	3	13	-10

	Score	
Anel Castillo (DOM)	11–6	Franklin Mina (ECU)
Christopher de Sousa (CAN)	5–3	Wellington Barbosa (BRA)
Anel Castillo (DOM)	9–2	Christopher de Sousa (CAN)
Franklin Mina (ECU)	8–0	Wellington Barbosa (BRA)
Anel Castillo (DOM)	0–0	Wellington Barbosa (BRA)
Franklin Mina (ECU)	12–4	Christopher de Sousa (CAN)

=== Finals ===
Semifinals
Jander Tiril (CUB)	1
Franklin Mina (ECU)	9
Brian Irr (USA)	5
Anel Castillo (DOM)	5

Gold medal match
Franklin Mina (ECU)	6
Anel Castillo (DOM)	2
