= Fencing at the 2023 Pan American Games – Women's team épée =

Men's team epée at the 2023 Pan American Games
- Venue: Paralympic Training Center
- Dates: November 4
- Competitors: 18 from 10 nations

Medalists
Gold medal	Nathalie Moellhausen; Victória Vizeu; Amanda Simeão	Brazil
Silver medal	Alexanne Verret; Ruien Xiao; Leonora MacKinnon	Canada
Bronze medal	Eliana Lugo; Lizze Asis; María Martínez	Venezuela

The men's team epée competition of the fencing events at the 2023 Pan American Games was held on November 4 at the Paralympic Training Center.

== Format ==
The team épée competition consisted of a three-round single-elimination bracket with a bronze medal match between the two semifinal losers and classification semifinals and finals for 5th to 8th places. Teams consist of three members each. Matches consist of nine bouts, with every fencer on one team facing each fencer on the other team. Scoring carried over between bouts with a total of 45 touches being the team goal. Bouts lasted until one team reached the target multiple of 5 touches. For example, if the first bout ended with a score of 5–3, that score would remain into the next bout and the second bout would last until one team reached 10 touches. Bouts also had a maximum time of three minutes each; if the final bout ended before either team reached 45 touches, the team leading at that point won. A tie at that point would result in an additional one-minute sudden-death time period. This sudden-death period was further modified by the selection of a draw-winner beforehand; if neither fencer scored a touch during the minute, the predetermined draw-winner won the bout.

== Schedule ==
Date	Time	Round
November 4, 2023	11:00	Quarterfinals
November 4, 2023	12:40	Semifinals
November 4, 2023	12:40	Fifth - Eight Place
November 4, 2023	14:20	Seventh - Eight Place
November 4, 2023	14:20	Fifth - Sixth Place
November 4, 2023	16:00	Finals

== Results ==
The results were as follows:

Quarterfinals
Canada	45
Costa Rica	25
Mexico	39
Argentina	36
Brazil	45
Colombia	34
Chile	32
Venezuela	44

Semifinals
Canada	45
Mexico	31
Brazil	45
Venezuela	35

Final
Canada	40
Brazil	45
Third place
Mexico	42
Venezuela	45

=== Classification 5 – 8 ===
Classification
Argentina	45
Costa Rica	29
Chile	29
Colombia	45

Fifth place
Argentina	45
Colombia	37
Seventh place
Costa Rica	41
Chile	45

== Final classification ==
Rank	Team	Athlete
1st place, gold medalist(s)	Brazil	Nathalie Moellhausen; Victória Vizeu; Amanda Simeão
2nd place, silver medalist(s)	Canada	Alexanne Verret; Ruien Xiao; Leonora MacKinnon
3rd place, bronze medalist(s)	Venezuela	Eliana Lugo; Lizze Asis; María Martínez
4	Mexico	María Morales; Frania Tejeda; Sheila Tejeda
5	Argentina	Melisa Englert; Datev Nahapetyan; Clara Di Tella
6	Colombia	Laura Castillo; Carmen Correa; María Jaramillo
7	Chile	Paula Vásquez; Analía Fernández; Ignacia Cifuentes
8	Costa Rica	Anghella Brilla; Karina Dyner; Daniela Jurado
