= Fencing at the 2015 Pan American Games – Women's team épée =

Women's team épée at the 2015 Pan American Games
- Venue: Toronto Pan Am Sports Centre
- Dates: July 24
- Competitors: 24 from 8 nations

Medalists
| Gold medal | Katharine Holmes; Katarzyna Trzopek; Anna van Brummen | United States |
| Silver medal | Eliana Lugo; Dayana Martinez; María Martínez | Venezuela |
| Bronze medal | Rayssa Costa; Nathalie Moellhausen; Amanda Simeão | Brazil |

The women's team épée competition of the fencing events at the 2015 Pan American Games was held on July 24 at the Toronto Pan Am Sports Centre.

The team épée competition consisted of a three-round single-elimination bracket with a bronze medal match between the two semifinal losers and classification semifinals and finals for 5th to 8th places. Teams consist of three members each. Matches consist of nine bouts, with every fencer on one team facing each fencer on the other team. Scoring carried over between bouts with a total of 45 touches being the team goal. Bouts lasted until one team reached the target multiple of 5 touches. For example, if the first bout ended with a score of 5–3, that score would remain into the next bout and the second bout would last until one team reached 10 touches. Bouts also had a maximum time of three minutes each; if the final bout ended before either team reached 45 touches, the team leading at that point won. A tie at that point would result in an additional one-minute sudden-death time period. This sudden-death period was further modified by the selection of a draw-winner beforehand; if neither fencer scored a touch during the minute, the predetermined draw-winner won the bout.

== Schedule ==
All times are Eastern Daylight Time (UTC−4).

| Date | Time | Round |
|---|---|---|
| July 24, 2015 | 8:35 | Quarterfinals |
| July 24, 2015 | 9:50 | Fifth to eighth |
| July 24, 2015 | 11:05 | Semifinals |
| July 24, 2015 | 17:05 | Bronze medal match |
| July 24, 2015 | 19:05 | Final |

== Results ==
The following are the results of the event.

Quarterfinals
1 | United States | 45
8 | Dominican Republic | 33
5 | Argentina | 39
4 | Brazil | 45
3 | Canada | 26
6 | Cuba | 45
7 | Colombia | 38
2 | Venezuela | 45

Semifinals
1 | United States | 32
4 | Brazil | 31
6 | Cuba | 31
2 | Venezuela | 37

Final
1 | United States | 29
2 | Venezuela | 22
Third place
4 | Brazil | 38
6 | Cuba | 29

=== Classification 5 – 8 ===
Classification
8 | Dominican Republic | 45
5 | Argentina | 38
3 | Canada | 45
7 | Colombia | 39

Fifth place
8 | Dominican Republic | 37
3 | Canada | 45
Seventh place
5 | Argentina | 39
7 | Colombia | 45

== Final classification ==
| Rank | Team | Athlete |
|---|---|---|
| 1st place, gold medalist(s) | United States | Katharine Holmes; Katarzyna Trzopek; Anna van Brummen |
| 2nd place, silver medalist(s) | Venezuela | Eliana Lugo; Dayana Martinez; María Martínez |
| 3rd place, bronze medalist(s) | Brazil | Rayssa Costa; Nathalie Moellhausen; Amanda Simeão |
| 4 | Cuba | Yoslaine Cardenal; Seily Mendoza; Yamirka Rodriguez |
| 5 | Canada | Malinka Hoppe; Leonora MacKinnon; Alexis Rudkovska |
| 6 | Dominican Republic | Elisa Bocchia; Elsa Mateo; Violeta Ramírez Peguero |
| 7 | Colombia | Laskmi Lozano; Diana Rodriguez; Oriana Tovar Karaindros |
| 8 | Argentina | Elida Aguero; Isabel Di Tella; Maria Dueñas Nicolau |
