= Fencing at the 2015 Pan American Games – Women's épée =

Women's épée at the 2015 Pan American Games
- Venue: Toronto Pan Am Sports Centre
- Dates: July 21
- Competitors: 18 from 10 nations

Medalists
Gold medal	Katharine Holmes	United States
Silver medal	Violeta Ramírez Peguero	Dominican Republic
Bronze medal	María Martínez	Venezuela
Bronze medal	Nathalie Moellhausen	Brazil

The women's épée competition of the fencing events at the 2015 Pan American Games was held on July 21 at the Toronto Pan Am Sports Centre.

The épée competition consisted of a qualification round followed by a single-elimination bracket with a bronze medal match between the two semifinal losers. Fencing was done to 15 touches or to the completion of three three-minute rounds if neither fencer reached 15 touches by then. At the end of time, the higher-scoring fencer was the winner; a tie resulted in an additional one-minute sudden-death time period. This sudden-death period was further modified by the selection of a draw-winner beforehand; if neither fencer scored a touch during the minute, the predetermined draw-winner won the bout.

== Schedule ==
All times are Eastern Daylight Time (UTC-4).

Date	Time	Round
July 21, 2015	9:05	Qualification pools
July 21, 2015	10:45	Round of 16
July 21, 2015	11:32	Quarterfinals
July 21, 2015	18:10	Semifinals
July 21, 2015	19:33	Final

== Results ==
The following are the results of the event.

=== Qualification ===
All 18 fencers were put into three groups of six athletes, were each fencer would have five individual matches. The top 16 athletes overall would qualify for next round.

Rank	Name	Nation	Victories	TG	TR	Dif.	Notes
1	Yamirka Rodriguez	Cuba	4	21	10	+11	Q
2	Isabel Di Tella	Argentina	4	19	8	+11	Q
3	Rayssa Costa	Brazil	4	24	14	+10	Q
4	Katarzyna Trzopek	United States	4	23	15	+8	Q
5	María Martínez	Venezuela	4	22	16	+6	Q
6	Nathalie Moellhausen	Brazil	3	22	17	+5	Q
7	Katharine Holmes	United States	3	17	13	+4	Q
8	Violeta Ramírez Peguero	Dominican Republic	3	18	17	+1	Q
9	Dirley Yepes	Costa Rica	2	19	18	+1	Q
10	Leonora MacKinnon	Canada	2	16	18	-2	Q
11	Laskmi Lozano	Colombia	2	19	22	-3	Q
12	Elsa Mateo	Dominican Republic	2	17	20	-3	Q
13	María Luisa Doig	Peru	2	17	22	-5	Q
14	Eliana Lugo	Venezuela	2	15	20	-5	Q
15	Elida Aguero	Argentina	2	12	18	-6	Q
16	Malinka Hoppe	Canada	1	13	24	-11	Q
17	Diana Rodriguez	Colombia	1	10	22	-12	
18	Seily Mendoza	Cuba	0	13	23	-10	

=== Elimination round ===
Round of 16
1	Yamirka Rodriguez (CUB)	15
16	Malinka Hoppe (CAN)	8
9	Dirley Yepes (CRC)	12
8	Violeta Ramírez Peguero (DOM)	15
5	María Martínez (VEN)	15
12	Elsa Mateo (DOM)	9
13	María Luisa Doig (PER)	2
4	Katarzyna Trzopek (USA)	15
3	Rayssa Costa (BRA)	14
14	Eliana Lugo (VEN)	15
11	Laskmi Lozano (COL)	4
6	Nathalie Moellhausen (BRA)	15
7	Katharine Holmes (USA)	14
10	Leonora MacKinnon (CAN)	12
15	Elida Agüero (ARG)	7
2	Isabel Di Tella (ARG)	15

Quarterfinals
1	Yamirka Rodriguez (CUB)	14
8	Violeta Ramírez Peguero (DOM)	15
5	María Martínez (VEN)	15
4	Katarzyna Trzopek (USA)	14
14	Eliana Lugo (VEN)	5
6	Nathalie Moellhausen (BRA)	15
7	Katharine Holmes (USA)	15
2	Isabel Di Tella (ARG)	6

Semifinals
8	Violeta Ramírez Peguero (DOM)	15
5	María Martínez (VEN)	10
6	Nathalie Moellhausen (BRA)	7
7	Katharine Holmes (USA)	10

Final
8	Violeta Ramírez Peguero (DOM)	14
7	Katharine Holmes (USA)	15
