= Taekwondo at the 2015 Pan American Games – Men's 80 kg =

Taekwondo – Men's 80 kg at the 2015 Pan American Games
- Venue: Mississauga Sports Centre
- Dates: July 21
- Competitors: 15 from 15 nations

Medalists
Gold medal	Jose Cobas	Cuba
Silver medal	Moises Hernandez	Dominican Republic
Bronze medal	René Lizárraga	Mexico
Bronze medal	Steven López	United States

The men's 80 kg competition of the taekwondo events at the 2015 Pan American Games took place on July 21 at the Mississauga Sports Centre. The defending Pan American Games champion was Sebastián Crismanich of the Argentina, who was injured and did not compete.

== Qualification ==
Most athletes qualified through the qualification tournament held in March 2015 in Mexico, while host nation Canada was permitted to enter one athlete. Two athletes from Nicaragua and the Saint Vincent and the Grenadines later received wildcards to compete in this event.

== Schedule ==
All times are Eastern Daylight Time (UTC-4).

Date	Time	Round
July 21, 2015	14:20	Preliminaries
July 21, 2015	15:50	Quarterfinals
July 21, 2015	16:50	Semifinals
July 21, 2015	20:20	Repechage
July 21, 2015	20:50	Bronze medal matches/Final

== Results ==
=== Main bracket ===
The final results were:

Preliminary round
Agustin Alves (ARG)	11
Michael Rodriguez (NCA)	2
Mikhail Charles (VIN)	0
Javier Medina (VEN)	17
Jose Cobas (CUB)	8
Andre De Olveira (BRA)	5
Chris Iliesco (CAN)	5
Miguel Ferrera (HON)	3
Moisés Hernández (DOM)	9
Neyder Lozano (COL)	4
Elias Robles (CHI)	2
Elvis Barbosa (PUR)	1
Guillermo Rodas (GUA)	4
Steven López (USA)	12

Quarterfinals
René Lizárraga (MEX)	12
Agustin Alves (ARG)	6
Javier Medina (VEN)	6
Jose Cobas (CUB)	18
Chris Iliesco (CAN)	4
Moisés Hernández (DOM)	7
Elias Robles (CHI)	3
Steven López (USA)	4

Semifinals
René Lizárraga (MEX)	4
Jose Cobas (CUB)	5
Moisés Hernández (DOM)	3
Steven López (USA)	2

Gold medal match
Jose Cobas (CUB)	10
Moisés Hernández (DOM)	9

=== Repechage ===
Semifinal			Bronze medal match
			1	René Lizárraga (MEX)	9
2	Chris Iliesco (CAN)	8		Chris Iliesco (CAN)	8
3	Neyder Lozano (COL)	5

Semifinal			Bronze medal match
			1	Javier Medina (VEN)	3
2	Andre De Olveira (BRA)	7		Steven López (USA)	7
3	Javier Medina (VEN)	9
