= Steven Wilcox =

Canadian boxer

Personal information
- Nickname: The Piranha
- Nationality: Canadian
- Born: Hamilton, Ontario, Canada
- Height: 181 cm (5 ft 11 1/2 in)
- Weight: Lightweight; Light-welterweight

Boxing career
- Stance: Orthodox

Boxing record
- Total fights: 17
- Wins: 15
- Win by KO: 5
- Losses: 1
- Draws: 1

Steven Wilcox is a Canadian professional boxer.

== Background ==
Wilcox started boxing at the age of 11 and, by 21, was a full-time professional boxer.

Wilcox won the Canadian lightweight championship in 2013, scoring an eighth-round TKO, as Wilcox defeated journeyman Marcel Maillet Jr. to win his first pro belt. He turned pro in 2012 after defeating Nicolas Valcourt in February 2011 (and an amateur career with over 180 fights).

=== WBA-NABA Super Lightweight Champion ===
On October 1, 2016, Steven Wilcox defeated Jesus Kibunde Kakonge in a 10-round unanimous decision bout in Hamilton, Ontario, Canada at the Hamilton Convention Centre for the "Fights4TheCure" charity, presented by Dan Otter. Wilcox became the WBA-NABA Super Lightweight champion.

=== C.P.B.C Light Welterweight Rankings ===
Steven Wilcox is currently ranked 4th in the Light Welterweight division/Canadian Professional Boxing Council

== Professional boxing record ==
15 wins (5 knockouts), 1 losses, 1 draws, 0 no contests
Res.	Record	Opponent	Type	Round	Date	Location	Notes
Win	15-1-1	(Canada) Jesus Kibunde Kakonge	UD	12	2016-10-01	Hamilton Convention Centre, Hamilton, Ontario, Canada	
Win	14-1-1	(Mexico) Juan Bedolla Orozco	UD	8	2016-07-28	The Danforth Music Hall, Toronto, Ontario, Canada	
Win	13-1-1	(Mexico) Pedro Navarrete	UD	8	2016-03-12	Tohu, Montreal, Quebec, Canada	
Win	12-1-1	(Argentina) Luis Armando Juarez	UD	8	2015-08-29	Hershey Centre, Mississauga, Ontario, Canada	
Draw	11-1-1	(Canada) Michael Gadbois	MD	8	2015-04-14	Royal York Hotel, Toronto, Ontario, Canada	
Win	11-1-0	(Poland) Jacek Wylezol	UD	8	2014-12-13	Club de boxe de l’est, Montreal, Quebec, Canada	
Win	10-1-0	(Hungary) Imre Nagy	RTD	7(10)	2014-07-26	Festival Arena, Shediac, New Brunswick, Canada	
Win	9-1-0	(Mexico) Saul Mendoza	UD	6	2014-05-03	Hershey Centre, Mississauga, Ontario, Canada	
Loss	8-1-0	(Mexico) Christian Uruzquieta	SD	8	2013-11-30	Hershey Centre, Mississauga, Ontario, Canada	
Win	8-0-0	(Canada) Marcel Maillet Jr	TKO	8(10)	2013-08-24	Africville Park, Halifax, Nova Scotia, Canada	
Win	7-0-0	(Italy) Raffaele Laezza	UD	10	2013-06-01	Hershey Centre, Mississauga, Ontario, Canada	
Win	6-0-0	(Hungary) David Kis	TKO	4(8)	2013-02-02	Moncton Lions Club, Moncton, New Brunswick, Canada	
Win	5-0-0	(Italy) Harrison McBain	UD	6	2012-12-01	Hershey Centre, Mississauga, Ontario, Canada	
Win	4-0-0	(Mexico) Carlos Martinez	TKO	6	2012-10-26	Holiday Inn, Pointe-Claire, Quebec, Canada	
Win	3-0-0	(Hungary) Sandor Horvath	TKO	6	2012-09-08	Hershey Centre, Mississauga, Ontario, Canada	
Win	2-0-0	(Canada) David Aucoin	UD	6	2012-05-12	Hershey Centre, Mississauga, Ontario, Canada	
Win	1-0-0	(Canada) Nicolas Valcourt	TKO	4	2012-02-11	Hershey Centre, Mississauga, Ontario, Canada	
