= Tatyana Gudkova (fencer) =

Russian fencer (born 1993)

Personal information
- Full name: Tatyana Mikhailovna Gudkova
- Born: 11 January 1993 (age 33) Smolensk, Russia
- Home town: Moscow, Russia
- Height: 1.79 m (5 ft 10 in)
- Weight: 68 kg (150 lb)

Fencing career
- Sport: Fencing
- Weapon: Épée
- Hand: left-handed
- Club: CSKA Moscow (Central Sports Army Club) [RUS]; MGFSO [RUS].
- Head coach: Alexander Kislyunin, Vitaly Kislyunin, Maria Mazina
- FIE ranking: current ranking
Medal record
Women's fencing
Representing Russia
World Championships
Gold medal – first place	2017 Leipzig	Individual épée
European Championships
Silver medal – second place	2017 Tbilisi	Team épée

Tatyana Mikhailovna Gudkova (Russian: Татьяна Михайловна Гудкова; born 11 January 1993) is a Russian épée fencer, gold medallist in the 2017 World Championships. She is a Russian Armed Forces athlete, and her club is Central Sports Army Club [RUS] and MGFSO [RUS].
