= Taekwondo at the 2015 Pan American Games – Men's 58 kg =

Taekwondo – Men's 58 kg at the 2015 Pan American Games
- Venue: Mississauga Sports Centre
- Dates: July 19
- Competitors: 16 from 16 nations

Medalists
Gold medal	Carlos Navarro	Mexico
Silver medal	Luisito Pie	Dominican Republic
Bronze medal	Harold Avella	Colombia
Bronze medal	Lucas Guzman	Argentina

The men's 58 kg competition of the taekwondo events at the 2015 Pan American Games took place on July 19 at the Mississauga Sports Centre. The defending Pan American Games champion was Gabriel Mercedes of the Dominican Republic.

== Qualification ==
Most athletes qualified through the qualification tournament held in March 2015 in Mexico, while host nation Canada was permitted to enter one athlete. Three athletes from Ecuador, Panama and Paraguay later received wildcards to compete in this event.

== Schedule ==
All times are Eastern Daylight Time (UTC-4).

Date	Time	Round
July 19, 2015	14:05	Preliminaries
July 19, 2015	15:50	Quarterfinals
July 19, 2015	17:20	Semifinals
July 19, 2015	20:20	Repechage
July 19, 2015	20:50	Bronze medal matches/Final

== Results ==
Legend

- DSQ — Disqualified

=== Main bracket ===
The final results were:

Preliminary round
Lucas Guzman (ARG)	6
Luisito Pie (DOM)	8
Mario Leal (VEN)	8
Francisco Palacios (GUA)	5
Chester Peralta (ECU)	14
Rafael Mota Jr (PUR)	13
John Maduro (ARU)	9
Tyler Muscat (CAN)	4
Venilton Torres (BRA)	14
Victor Gonzalez (PAN)	1
Logan Gerrick (USA)	4
Danilo Castillo (NCA)	3
Harold Avella (COL)	16
Luis Oblitas (PER)	15
Matias Fernandez (PAR)	DSQ
Carlos Navarro (MEX)

Second round
Luisito Pie (DOM)	14
Mario Leal (VEN)	13
Chester Peralta (ECU)	3
John Maduro (ARU)	4
Venilton Torres (BRA)	12
Logan Gerrick (USA)	8
Harold Avella (COL)	1
Carlos Navarro (MEX)	20

Semifinals
Luisito Pie (DOM)	4
John Maduro (ARU)	3
Venilton Torres (BRA)	9
Carlos Navarro (MEX)	11

Gold medal match
Luisito Pie (DOM)	7
Carlos Navarro (MEX)	8

=== Repechage ===
Semifinal			Bronze medal match
			1	John Maduro (ARU)	1
2	Matias Fernandez (PAR)	DSQ		Harold Avella (COL)	3
3	Harold Avella (COL)

Semifinal			Bronze medal match
			1	Lucas Guzman (ARG)	2
2	Lucas Guzman (ARG)	10		Venilton Torres (BRA)	0
3	Mario Leal (VEN)	2
