= Fencing at the 2019 Pan American Games – Women's épée =

Women's épée at the 2019 Pan American Games
- Venue: Lima Convention Centre
- Dates: August 7
- Competitors: 18 from 10 nations

Medalists
Gold medal	Katharine Holmes	United States
Silver medal	Patrizia Piovesan	Venezuela
Bronze medal	Isabel Di Tella	Argentina
Bronze medal	Nathalie Moellhausen	Brazil

The women's épée competition of the fencing events at the 2019 Pan American Games was held on August 7 at the Lima Convention Centre.

The épée competition consisted of a qualification round followed by a single-elimination bracket with a bronze medal match between the two semifinal losers. Fencing was done to 15 touches or to the completion of three three-minute rounds if neither fencer reached 15 touches by then. At the end of time, the higher-scoring fencer was the winner; a tie resulted in an additional one-minute sudden-death time period. This sudden-death period was further modified by the selection of a draw-winner beforehand; if neither fencer scored a touch during the minute, the predetermined draw-winner won the bout.

== Schedule ==
Date	Time	Round
August 7, 2019	10:00	Qualification pools
August 7, 2019	12:30	Round of 16
August 7, 2019	14:00	Quarterfinals
August 7, 2019	16:00	Semifinals
August 7, 2019	18:10	Final

== Results ==
The following are the results of the event.

=== Qualification ===
All 18 fencers were put into three groups of six athletes, were each fencer would have five individual matches. The top 14 athletes overall would qualify for next round.

Rank	Name	Nation	Victories	TG	TR	Dif.	Notes
1	Isabel Di Tella	Argentina	5	23	16	+7	Q
2	Katharine Holmes	United States	4	22	9	+13	Q
3	Nathalie Moellhausen	Brazil	4	23	15	+8	Q
4	María Luisa Doig	Peru	4	22	18	+4	Q
5	Catherine Nixon	United States	2	22	16	+6	Q
6	Malinka Hoppe	Canada	3	20	15	+5	Q
7	Yamirka Rodriguez	Cuba	3	18	13	+5	Q
8	Elizabeth Medina López	Mexico	3	21	18	+3	Q
8	Sheila Tejeda	Mexico	3	21	18	+3	Q
10	Leonora Mackinnon	Canada	3	16	16	0	Q
11	Seily Mendoza	Cuba	2	20	21	-1	Q
12	Patrizia Piovesan	Venezuela	2	18	19	-1	Q
13	Josefina Méndez Bello	Argentina	2	17	22	-5	Q
14	Amanda Netto	Brazil	1	14	19	-5	Q
15	María Martínez	Venezuela	1	16	23	-7	
16	Cynthia Roldán	Peru	1	14	21	-7	
17	Violeta Ramírez	Dominican Republic	1	10	23	-13	
18	Karina Dyner	Costa Rica	0	10	25	-15	

=== Elimination round ===
Round of 16
9	Sheila Tejeda (MEX)	15
8	Elizabeth Medina López (MEX)	10
5	Catherine Nixon (USA)	9
12	Patrizia Piovesan (VEN)	15
13	Josefina Méndez Bello (ARG)	7
4	María Luisa Doig (PER)	15
3	Nathalie Moellhausen (BRA)	15
14	Amanda Netto (BRA)	9
11	Seily Mendoza (CUB)	15
6	Malinka Hoppe (CAN)	9
7	Yamirka Rodriguez (CUB)	15
10	Leonora Mackinnon (CAN)	14

Quarterfinals
1	Isabel Di Tella (ARG)	15
9	Sheila Tejeda (MEX)	10
12	Patrizia Piovesan (VEN)	14
4	María Luisa Doig (PER)	11
3	Nathalie Moellhausen (BRA)	15
11	Seily Mendoza (CUB)	5
7	Yamirka Rodriguez (CUB)	12
2	Katharine Holmes (USA)	15

Semifinals
1	Isabel Di Tella (ARG)	12
12	Patrizia Piovesan (VEN)	15
3	Nathalie Moellhausen (BRA)	9
2	Katharine Holmes (USA)	15

Final
12	Patrizia Piovesan (VEN)	10
2	Katharine Holmes (USA)	14
