= Fencing at the 2023 Pan American Games – Women's épée =

Women's épée at the 2023 Pan American Games
- Venue: Paralympic Training Center
- Dates: November 1
- Competitors: 18 from 10 nations

Medalists
Gold medal	Isabel Di Tella	Argentina
Silver medal	María Luisa Doig	Peru
Bronze medal	Analía Fernández	Chile
Bronze medal	Ruien Xiao	Canada

The women's épée competition of the fencing events at the 2023 Pan American Games was held on November 1 at the Paralympic Training Center.

The épée competition consisted of a qualification round followed by a single-elimination bracket with a bronze medal match between the two semifinal losers. Fencing was done to 15 touches or to the completion of three three-minute rounds if neither fencer reached 15 touches by then. At the end of time, the higher-scoring fencer was the winner; a tie resulted in an additional one-minute sudden-death time period. This sudden-death period was further modified by the selection of a draw-winner beforehand; if neither fencer scored a touch during the minute, the predetermined draw-winner won the bout.

== Schedule ==
Date	Time	Round
November 1, 2023	11:00	Qualification pools
November 1, 2023	13:40	Round of 16
November 1, 2023	15:20	Quarterfinals
November 1, 2023	16:30	Semifinals
November 1, 2023	18:10	Final

== Results ==
The following are the results of the event.

=== Qualification ===
All 18 fencers were put into three groups of six athletes, were each fencer would have five individual matches. The top 14 athletes overall would qualify for next round.

Rank	Name	Nation	Victories	TG	TR	Dif.	Notes
1	Nathalie Moellhausen	Brazil	5	24	11	+13	Q
2	Ruien Xiao	Canada	5	23	11	+12	Q
3	Montserrat Viveros	Paraguay	4	21	12	+9	Q
4	Maria Fernanda Morales	Mexico	4	19	17	+2	Q
5	Lizzie Asis	Venezuela	3	19	14	+5	Q
6	María Luisa Doig	Peru	3	17	15	+2	Q
7	Alexanne Verret	Canada	3	17	17	0	Q
8	Isabel Di Tella	Argentina	3	18	20	-2	Q
9	Paula Vásquez del Campo	Chile	2	19	18	+1	Q
10	Melisa Englert	Argentina	2	20	20	0	Q
11	María Jaramillo	Colombia	2	18	19	-1	Q
12	Analía Fernández	Chile	2	17	19	-1	Q
13	Franja Tejeda	Mexico	2	17	21	-4	Q
14	Carmen Correa	Colombia	2	11	18	-7	Q
15	María Martínez	Venezuela	1	16	20	-4	Q
16	Karina Dyner	Costa Rica	1	17	23	-6	Q
17	Victoria Vizeu	Brazil	1	16	23	-7	
18	Daniela Jurado	Costa Rica	0	13	24	-11	

=== Elimination round ===
Round of 16
1	Nathalie Moellhausen (BRA)	9
16	Karina Dyner (CRC)	8
9	Paula Vásquez del Campo (CHI)	10
8	Isabel Di Tella (ARG)	15
5	Lizzie Asis (VEN)	7
12	Analía Fernández (CHI)	10
13	Franja Tejeda (MEX)	14
4	Maria Fernanda Morales (MEX)	15
3	Montserrat Viveros (PAR)	15
14	Carmen Correa (COL)	2
11	María Jaramillo (COL)	9
6	María Luisa Doig (PER)	15
7	Alexanne Verret (CAN)	15
10	Melisa Englert (ARG)	9
15	María Martínez (VEN)	10
2	Ruien Xiao (CAN)	15

Quarterfinals
1	Nathalie Moellhausen (BRA)	13
8	Isabel Di Tella (ARG)	15
12	Analía Fernández (CHI)	15
4	Maria Fernanda Morales (MEX)	12
3	Montserrat Viveros (PAR)	10
6	María Luisa Doig (PER)	15
7	Alexanne Verret (CAN)	9
2	Ruien Xiao (CAN)	15

Semifinals
8	Isabel Di Tella (ARG)	15
12	Analía Fernández (CHI)	11
6	María Luisa Doig (PER)	15
2	Ruien Xiao (CAN)	10

Final
8	Isabel Di Tella (ARG)	15
6	María Luisa Doig (PER)	9
