= Amanda Simeão =

Brazilian fencer (born 1994)

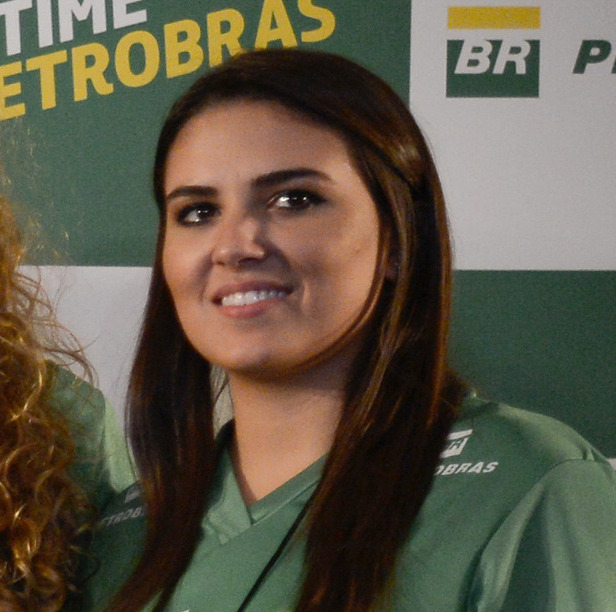
- Simeão in 2016

Personal information
- Born: 2 June 1994 (age 32) Curitiba, Brazil
- Height: 166 cm (5 ft 5 in)
- Weight: 62 kg (137 lb)

Sport
- Sport: Fencing
- Event: Épée
- Club: Sociedade Thalia
- Coached by: Daniel Levavasseur; Giocondo Cabral
Medal record
Representing Brazil
Pan American Games
Gold medal – first place	2023 Santiago	Team
Bronze medal – third place	2015 Toronto	Team épée

Amanda Simeão (born 2 June 1994) is a Brazilian épée fencer who won a team bronze medal at the 2015 Pan American Games. She qualified in the individual and team épée for the 2016 Summer Olympics.
