= Isabel Di Tella =

Argentine fencer (born 1993)

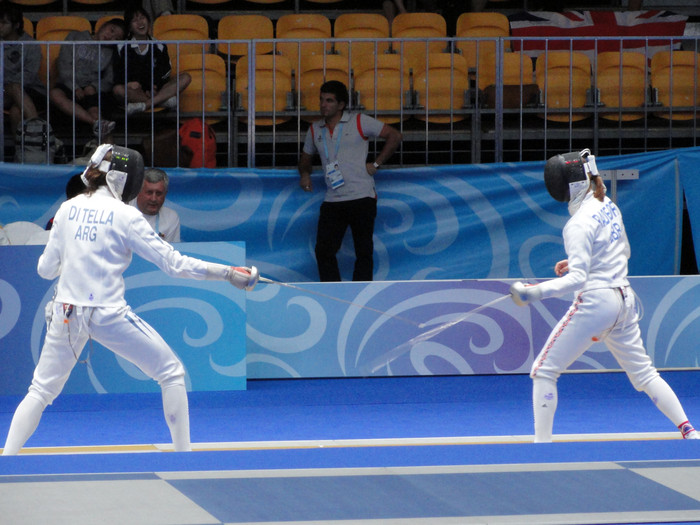
- 2010 Summer Youth Olympics

Personal information
- Born: Clara Isabel María de las Mercedes di Tella; 10 June 1993 (age 33) Oxfordshire, England

Fencing career
- Sport: Fencing
- Country: Argentina
- Weapon: Épée
- Hand: Right-handed
Medal record
Women's fencing
Representing Argentina
Pan American Games
Gold medal – first place	2023 Santiago	Épée
Bronze medal – third place	2019 Lima	Épée
Pan American Championships
Gold medal – first place	2025 Rio de Janeiro	Individual
Bronze medal – third place	2024 Lima	Team épée
South American Games
Gold medal – first place	2026 South American Games	Individual épée

Clara Isabel María de las Mercedes di Tella (born 10 June 1993) is an Argentine fencer. She won gold in the women's épée individual events at the 2023 Pan American Games, 2025 Pan American Championship, and 2026 South American Games.

In 2010, she competed in the cadet female épée event at the Summer Youth Olympics held in Singapore without winning a medal.

In 2015, she competed in the women's épée and women's team épée events at the Pan American Games held in Toronto, Canada. In both competitions she did not win a medal: in the individual event she was eliminated in her second match by Katharine Holmes of the United States and in the team event Argentina finished in last place.

In 2017, she competed in the women's épée event at the World Fencing Championships held in Leipzig, Germany.

She competed for Harvard Crimson fencing and graduated in 2016.

== Personal life ==
She was living with her mother and father, Astrid Steverlynck and Rafael di Tella, in Oxfordshire. She is the sister of Pascual, runner-up in sabre at the 2019 Pan American Games. She holds a Ph.D. in Economics from MIT.
