= Taekwondo at the 2015 Pan American Games – Women's +67 kg =

Taekwondo – Women's +67 kg at the 2015 Pan American Games
- Venue: Mississauga Sports Centre
- Dates: July 22
- Competitors: 10 from 10 nations

Medalists
Gold medal	Jackie Galloway	United States
Silver medal	María Espinoza	Mexico
Bronze medal	Jessica Bravo	Colombia
Bronze medal	Raphaella Galacho	Brazil

The women's +67 kg competition of the taekwondo events at the 2015 Pan American Games took place on July 22 at the Mississauga Sports Centre. The defending Pan American Games champion was Glenhis Hernández of Cuba.

== Qualification ==
All athletes qualified through the qualification tournament held in March 2015 in Mexico, while host nation Canada was permitted to enter one athlete. Later an athlete from the Virgin Islands was given a wildcard to compete in the event.

== Schedule ==
All times are Eastern Daylight Time (UTC-4).

Date	Time	Round
July 22, 2015	14:05	Preliminaries
July 22, 2015	14:35	Quarterfinals
July 22, 2015	15:50	Semifinals
July 22, 2015	20:35	Bronze medal matches/Final

== Results ==
=== Main bracket ===
The final results were:

Preliminary round
Nathalie Iliesco (CAN)	8
Keyla Ávila (HON)	0
Danese Joseph (ISV)	0
Lisbeilys Ferran (CUB)	12

Quarter-finals
María Espinoza (MEX)	4
Nathalie Iliesco (CAN)	3
Crystal Weekes (PUR)	3
Jessica Bravo (COL)	11
Raphaella Galacho (BRA)	4
Katherine Rodríguez (DOM)	2
Lisbeilys Ferran (CUB)	7
Jackie Galloway (USA)	11

Semi-finals
María Espinoza (MEX)	5
Jessica Bravo (COL)	4
Raphaella Galacho (BRA)	0
Jackie Galloway (USA)	5

Gold medal match
María Espinoza (MEX)	0
Jackie Galloway (USA)	1

=== Repechage ===
Bronze medal match
Jessica Bravo (COL)	9
Lisbeilys Ferran (CUB)	3

Bronze medal match
Nathalie Iliesco (CAN)	0
Raphaella Galacho (BRA)	1
