= Ruien Xiao =

Canadian fencer (born 2007)

Ruien (Angel) Xiao
Personal information
- Nationality: Canada
- Born: November 7, 2007 (age 18) Qingyuan, China

Sport
- Sport: Fencing
Medal record
Women's épée
Representing Canada
Pan American Games
Silver medal – second place	2023 Santiago	Team
Bronze medal – third place	2023 Santiago	Individual
Pan American Championships
Gold medal – first place	2024 Lima	Team
Silver medal – second place	2023 Lima	Team
Silver medal – second place	2025 Rio de Janeiro	Individual
Silver medal – second place	2025 Rio de Janeiro	Team
Silver medal – second place	2026 Lima	Team
Bronze medal – third place	2026 Lima	Individual
Junior World Championships
Gold medal – first place	2026 Rio de Janeiro	Team
Bronze medal – third place	2026 Rio de Janeiro	Individual

Ruien (Angel) Xiao (born November 7, 2007) is a Canadian fencer in the épée discipline. Xiao has won medals at the Pan American level. Xiao was born in China and she lives in Markham, Ontario.

== Career ==
In 2023, Xiao was picked for Canada's 2023 Pan American Games team. At the games, Xiao went on to win the silver medal in the women's team épée event and bronze in the individual event. In December 2023, Xiao won her first Senior World Cup medal.

Xiao qualified for the 2024 Summer Olympics after receiving a reallocated quota spot.
