= Taekwondo at the 2015 Pan American Games – Women's 49 kg =

Taekwondo – Women's 49 kg at the 2015 Pan American Games
- Venue: Mississauga Sports Centre
- Dates: July 19
- Competitors: 13 from 13 nations

Medalists
Gold medal	Yania Aguirre	Cuba
Silver medal	Itzel Manjarrez	Mexico
Bronze medal	Candelaria Martes	Dominican Republic
Bronze medal	Iris Silva	Brazil

The women's 49 kg competition of the taekwondo events at the 2015 Pan American Games took place on July 19 at the Mississauga Sports Centre. The defending Pan American Games champion was Ivett Gonda of the Canada.

== Qualification ==
All athletes qualified through the qualification tournament held in March 2015 in Mexico, while host nation Canada was permitted to enter one athlete.

== Schedule ==
All times are Eastern Daylight Time (UTC-4).

Date	Time	Round
July 19, 2015	14:20	Preliminaries
July 19, 2015	15:20	Quarterfinals
July 19, 2015	16:50	Semifinals
July 19, 2015	20:05	Repechage
July 19, 2015	20:35	Bronze medal matches/Final

== Results ==
=== Main bracket ===
The final results were:

Preliminary round
Virginia Dellan (VEN)	7
Yania Aguirre (CUB)	9
Monica Pimentel (ARU)	6
Victoria Stambaugh (PUR)	13
Elizabeth Zamora (GUA)	4
Charlotte Craig (USA)	1
Ibeth Rodriguez (COL)	8
Julissa Diez (PER)	1
Cyriese Hall (JAM)	2
Candelaria Martes (DOM)	12

Quarter-finals
Iris Sing (BRA)	5
Yania Aguirre (CUB)	6
Victoria Stambaugh (PUR)	3
Elizabeth Zamora (GUA)	4
Yvette Yong (CAN)	12
Ibeth Rodriguez (COL)	5
Candelaria Martes (DOM)	3
Itzel Manjarrez (MEX)	10

Semi-finals
Yania Aguirre (CUB)	17
Elizabeth Zamora (GUA)	5
Yvette Yong (CAN)	14
Itzel Manjarrez (MEX)	23

Gold medal match
Yania Aguirre (CUB)	10
Itzel Manjarrez (MEX)	9

=== Repechage ===
Bronze medal match
Elizabeth Zamora (GUA)	7
Candelaria Martes (DOM)	8

Semifinal			Bronze medal match
			1	Iris Sing (BRA)	8
2	Virginia Dellan (VEN)	1		Yvette Yong (CAN)	6
3	Iris Sing (BRA)	11
