= Patrizia Piovesan =

Venezuelan fencer

Personal information
- Full name: Patrizia Piovesan Silva
- Height: 170 cm (5 ft 7 in)

Fencing career
- Sport: Fencing
- Country: Venezuela
- Hand: Right-handed
Medal record
Women's fencing
Representing Venezuela
Pan American Games
Silver medal – second place	2019 Lima	Épée
Bronze medal – third place	2019 Lima	Team épée

Patrizia Piovesan Silva is a Venezuelan fencer. She won the silver medal in the women's épée event at the 2019 Pan American Games held in Lima, Peru. She also won the bronze medal in the women's team épée event.
