= Brian Irr =

American karateka (born 1988)

Personal information
- Born: July 17, 1988 (age 37) Amherst, New York

Sport
- Country: United States
- Sport: Karate
- Weight class: +84 kg
- Event: Kumite
Medal record
Men's karate
Representing United States
Pan American Games
Gold medal – first place	2019 Lima	Kumite +84 kg
Bronze medal – third place	2015 Toronto	Kumite +84 kg

Brian Irr (born July 17, 1988) is an American karateka. He won the gold medal in the men's kumite +84 kg event at the 2019 Pan American Games held in Lima, Peru. In the final, he defeated Daniel Gaysinsky of Canada.

== Career ==
In 2015, Irr won one of the bronze medals in men's kumite +84 kg at the Pan American Games held in Toronto, Canada.

In June 2021, Irr competed at the World Olympic Qualification Tournament held in Paris, France hoping to qualify for the 2020 Summer Olympics in Tokyo, Japan. He did not qualify at this tournament but he was able to qualify via continental representation soon after. He competed in the men's +75 kg event at the Olympics. In November 2021, he competed in the men's +84 kg event at the 2021 World Karate Championships held in Dubai, United Arab Emirates.

Irr competed in the men's kumite +84 kg event at the 2022 World Games held in Birmingham, United States. He finished in third place in his pool during the elimination round and he did not advance to compete in the semi-finals.

He competed in the men's kumite +84 kg event at the 2023 Pan American Games held in Santiago, Chile.

== Achievements ==
Year	Competition	Venue	Rank	Event
2015	Pan American Games	Toronto, Canada	3rd	Kumite +84 kg
2019	Pan American Games	Lima, Peru	1st	Kumite +84 kg
