= Carmen Guzman =

Dominican Republic-American basketball player

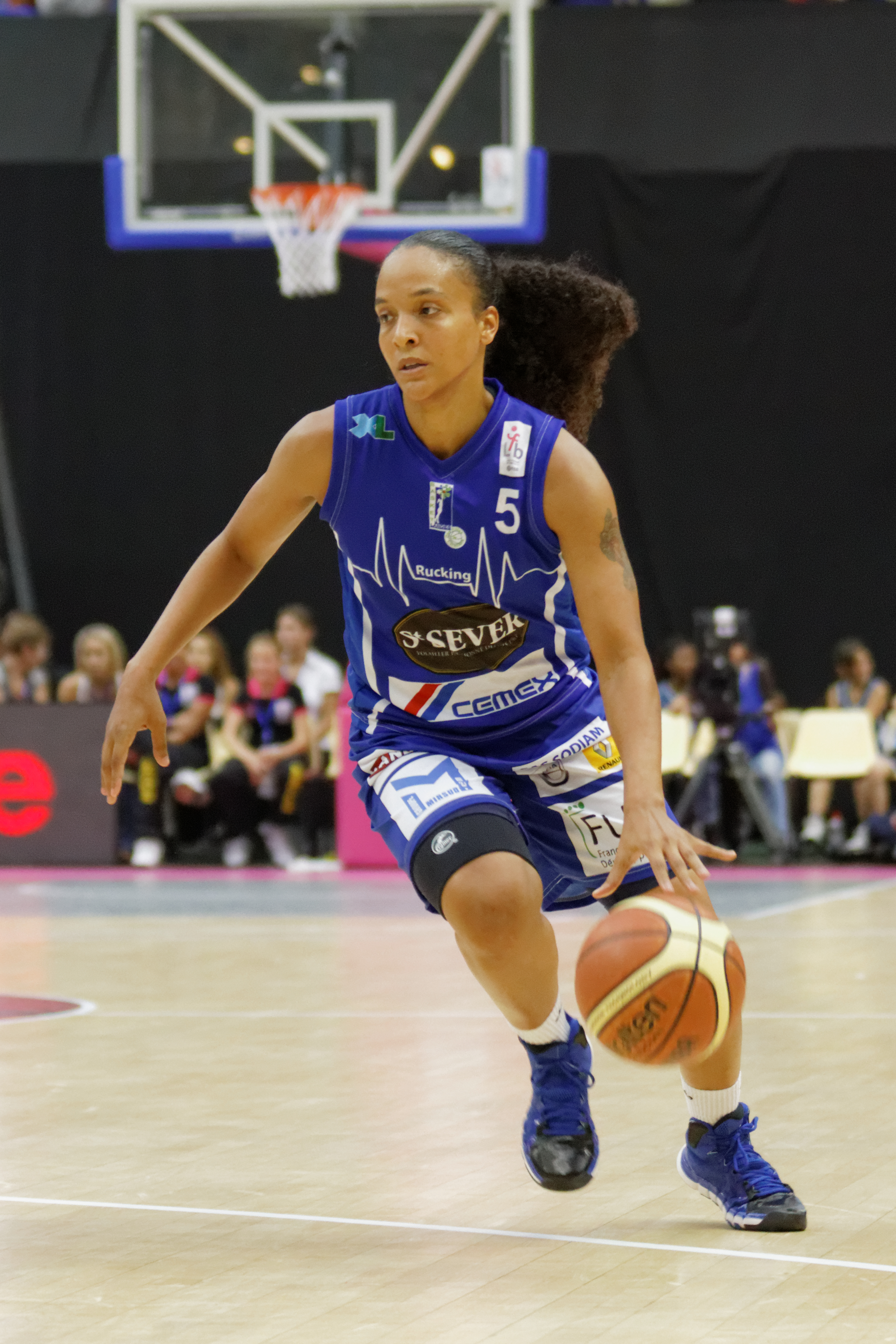

Personal information
- Born: July 16, 1985 (age 41) New York City, New York, U.S.
- Listed height: 1.72 m (5 ft 8 in)

Career information
- College: UAB (2003–2007)
- Position: Point guard / center

Career history
- 2003–2007: Blazers de l'Alabama
- 2007–2008: Adana
- 2009: Leipzig
- 2010: Halle
- 2010: San Lazaro
- 2010: Valencianas de Juncos
- 2011: Inpek
- 2011–2012: MBK Ružomberok
- 2012–2016: Basket Landes

Career highlights
- CUSA Player of the Year (2007); 2× First-team All-CUSA (2006, 2007)

Carmen Guzman (born July 16, 1985) is a Dominican–American female professional basketball player.

== Career statistics ==
Legend
GP	Games played	GS	Games started	MPG	Minutes per game	RPG	Rebounds per game
APG	Assists per game	SPG	Steals per game	BPG	Blocks per game	PPG	Points per game
TO	Turnovers per game	FG%	Field-goal percentage	3P%	3-point field-goal percentage	FT%	Free-throw percentage
**Bold**	Career best	°	League leader

=== College ===
Year	Team	GP	GS	MPG	FG%	3P%	FT%	RPG	APG	SPG	BPG	TO	PPG
2003–04	UAB	28	-	25.5	41.9	25.0	70.9	2.4	2.8	1.4	0.2	**2.3**	8.1
2004–05	UAB	27	-	34.4	35.8	31.0	67.6	4.4	2.2	2.3	0.1	4.2	13.9
2005–06	UAB	27	-	31.2	40.1	33.0	**74.7**	4.0	3.1	1.9	**0.0**	4.0	16.0
2006–07	UAB	**32**	-	**36.3**	**45.2**	**35.3**	74.4	**5.8**	**3.2**	2.2	0.1	3.5	**21.8**
**Career**		114	-	32.0	41.1	33.1	72.5	4.2	2.8	1.9	0.1	3.5	15.2
Statistics retrieved from Sports-Reference.
