= René Lizárraga =

Mexican taekwondo practitioner

Personal information
- Full name: René Lizárraga Valenzuela
- Born: 21 March 1993 (age 33) Mexico City, Mexico

Sport
- Sport: Taekwondo
Medal record
Representing Mexico
Pan American Games
Bronze medal – third place	2015 Toronto	Men's 80 kg
World Championships
Silver medal – second place	2013 Puebla	Men's 80 kg

René Lizárraga Valenzuela (Note: In this Spanish name, the first or paternal surname is Lizárraga and the second or maternal family name is Valenzuela.) (born 21 March 1993) is a Mexican taekwondo practitioner who won a silver medal at the 2013 World Taekwondo Championships. He was ranked 5th at the 2017 World Taekwondo Championships.
