= Katarzyna Trzopek =

American fencer

Personal information
- Nationality: American
- Born: 6 May 1981 (age 45) Warsaw, Poland
- Home town: Pacifica, California, United States
- Height: 1.76 m (5 ft 9 in)
- Weight: 74 kg (163 lb)

Sport
- Country: United States
- Sport: Fencing
Medal record
Representing United States
Pan American Games
| Gold medal – first place | 2015 Toronto | Team épée |

Katarzyna Trzopek (born 6 May 1981) is an American fencer. She represented her country at the 2016 Summer Olympics in the team épée fencing event.

== See also ==
- List of Pennsylvania State University Olympians
