= Katharine Holmes =

American fencer (born 1993)

Personal information
- Born: July 15, 1993 (age 33) Washington DC

Fencing career
- Sport: Fencing
- Country: United States
- Hand: Right-handed
- Club: New York Athletic Club
Medal record
Women's Épée
Representing the United States
World Championships
| Gold medal – first place | 2018 Wuxi | Team |
Pan American Games
| Gold medal – first place | 2015 Toronto | Individual |
| Gold medal – first place | 2015 Toronto | Team |
| Gold medal – first place | 2019 Lima | Individual |
| Gold medal – first place | 2019 Lima | Team |
Pan American Championships
| Gold medal – first place | 2023 Lima | Team |
| Silver medal – second place | 2024 Lima | Team |
| Bronze medal – third place | 2023 Lima | Individual |

Katharine (Kat) Holmes (born July 15, 1993) is an American fencer. She competed in the women's épée event at the 2016, 2020, and 2024 Summer Olympics. She was a world champion in the women’s epee team event (Wuxi, China 2018), which was the first World Championship medal won by an American women’s epee team. Holmes anchored the team, defeating Korea in overtime in the finals. She also anchored the United States women’s epee team to its first World Cup gold medal (Dubai 2018), defeating Russia in overtime in the finals. She was the back-to-back gold medalist in both the individual and team events at the Pan American Games in Lima in 2019 and Toronto in 2015.

Holmes fenced for Princeton University from 2011-2014, took two years off to train, qualify and compete in the 2016 Olympic Games in Rio, then returned to Princeton in 2016, graduating in 2017 magna cum laude with departmental honors. While at Princeton, she was a four-time All American fencer and four-time All Ivy League fencer. She was individual 2017 Ivy League Champion and team Ivy League Champion in 2012, 2013, 2014 and 2017. She also competed on the team that won Princeton’s first NCAA Fencing Championship in 2013. In 2018, Holmes was awarded the Fair Play Award for exemplary sportsmanship by the Federation International d'Escrime In 2026, she graduated with distinction from the Icahn School of Medicine at Mt. Sinai, where she is a resident physician.

== Medal record ==
=== World Championship ===
| Year | Location | Event | Position |
|---|---|---|---|
| 2018 | Wuxi, China | Team Women's Épée | 1st |

=== Pan American Championship ===
| Year | Location | Event | Position |
|---|---|---|---|
| 2023 | Lima, Peru | Individual Women's Épée | 3rd |
| 2023 | Lima, Peru | Team Women's Épée | 1st |
| 2024 | Lima, Peru | Team Women's Épée | 2nd |
