= Mississauga Sports and Entertainment Centre =

Arena in Mississauga, Ontario

- The arena interior pictured in 2024

- Location in Peel Region Location in Ontario Location in Canada
- Former names: Hershey Centre (1998–2018); Paramount Fine Foods Centre (2018–2026)
- Address: 5500/5600 Rose Cherry Place
- Location: Mississauga, Ontario
- Coordinates: 43.6323°N 79.6535°W
- Owner: City of Mississauga
- Operator: City of Mississauga
- Capacity: Basketball 5,400; Hockey: 5,420; Concerts: 7,000

Construction
- Groundbreaking: January 1998
- Opened: October 12, 1998
- Cost: C$22 million ($39.6 million in 2025 dollars)
- Architects: Parkin/ZAS Architects Inc., architects in joint venture
- Services engineer: The Mitchell Partnership
- General contractor: PCL Constructors Canada Inc.

Tenants
- Canada World Kabaddi Cup (1998–2012); Mississauga IceDogs (OHL) (1998–2007); Toronto ThunderHawks (NPSL) (2000–2001); Mississauga St. Michael's Majors (OHL) (2007–2012); Toronto Croatia (CSL) (2007–2010); Mississauga Eagles FC (CSL) (2011–2013); Toronto Triumph (LFL Canada) (2012); Mississauga Steelheads (OHL) (2012–2024); Mississauga Power (NBL Canada) (2013–2015); 2015 Pan American Games; 2015 Parapan American Games; Raptors 905 (NBAGL) (2015–present); Mississauga MetroStars (MASL) (2018–2019); Toronto Rock (NLL) (2024–2025; temp); Canadian Soccer League (2023)

Website
- mississaugasec.com

The Mississauga Sports and Entertainment Centre, formerly the Hershey Centre and Paramount Fine Foods Centre, is a multi-purpose sports and entertainment complex located in Mississauga, Ontario, Canada.

== History ==
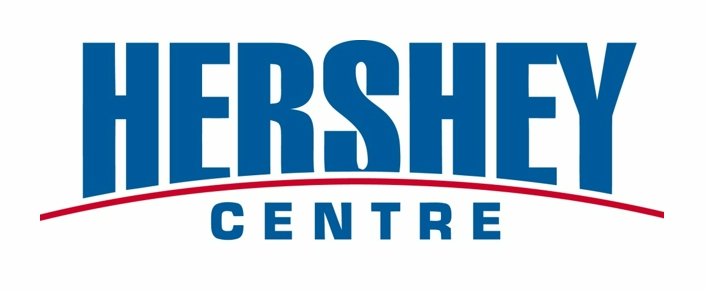
Logo as the Hershey Centre, 1998-2018

First opened in 1998 as the Hershey Centre, the complex is located on Rose Cherry Place, which was named after the late wife of Don Cherry, founder and former owner of the Mississauga IceDogs hockey team. The closest major intersection is Kennedy Road and Matheson Boulevard East. In 2007, a new multi-sport facility called SportZone opened just to the north of the main bowl. It houses a full-size indoor soccer field, a full size FIBA basketball court, a gymnastics facility, and two outdoor soccer fields.

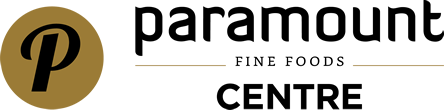
Logo as the Paramount Fine Foods Centre, 2018-2026

It was renamed the Paramount Fine Foods Centre on July 1, 2018, following a new naming rights agreement with Mississauga-based restaurant chain Paramount Fine Foods.

The centre is currently the home arena for the Raptors 905 of the NBA G League (basketball). It previously housed the Mississauga IceDogs of the Ontario Hockey League (ice hockey) from 1998 to 2007, the Mississauga Steelheads of the Ontario Hockey League (ice hockey) from 2012 to 2024, the Mississauga Power of the National Basketball League of Canada (basketball) from 2011 to 2015, the Toronto ThunderHawks of the National Professional Soccer League from 2000 to 2001, and the Mississauga MetroStars of the Major Arena Soccer League (indoor soccer) from 2018 to 2019. It has also been the venue for numerous musical acts, including The Tragically Hip, Green Day, The White Stripes, Hatebreed, and Chinese superstar Joker Xue.

In 2023, the city of Mississauga started a $30 million rehabilitation project for the arena. In conjunction with this, the city partnered with Maple Leaf Sports & Entertainment (owner of Raptors 905) to build a new practice facility for the team next to the arena. MLSE agreed to contribute up to $5.8 million of the $12.8 million cost. Construction started in June 2024, and the facility opened in March 2026.

The City of Mississauga announced on May 26, 2026 that it had terminated the naming rights agreement with Paramount Fine Foods due to lack of payment from Paramount. The facility was temporarily renamed the Mississauga Sports and Entertainment Centre as of June 1, 2026 while the city sought out a new sponsor.

== Major events ==
=== Hockey ===
Along with being the home of Mississauga's OHL teams since its opening, it has hosted several hockey events. In the year 2000 the Hershey Centre hosted the OHL All-Star Classic as well as the IIHF Women's World Hockey Championship. The OHL Championship Series for the J. Ross Robertson Cup has been held at the facility in 2004, 2011 and 2017. In May 2011 the Mississauga St. Michael's Majors hosted the 2011 Memorial Cup. The Saint John Sea Dogs defeated Mississauga in the Final 3–1.

=== Basketball ===
The National Basketball League of Canada announced that the Oshawa Power would relocate to Mississauga and play as the Mississauga Power at the Hershey Centre starting in the 2013–14 season.

The Toronto Raptors announced that beginning in the 2015–16 season, they would have a team in the NBA Development League in Mississauga and play as the Raptors 905 at the Hershey Centre. The Toronto Raptors organization acquired the Power. The team departed from the NBLC to join the NBA D-League as the Raptors 905. In 2017 and 2018 the Raptors 905 hosted both the NBA G League Showcase as well as the G League Finals at the arena.

=== Figure skating ===
The arena hosted the Skate Canada International figure skating competition, part of the ISU Grand Prix of Figure Skating series, in 2000, 2003, 2011, 2016, and 2022.

It hosted the Canadian Figure Skating Championships for the first time in 2013 and again in 2020.

=== 2015 Pan and Parapan American Games ===
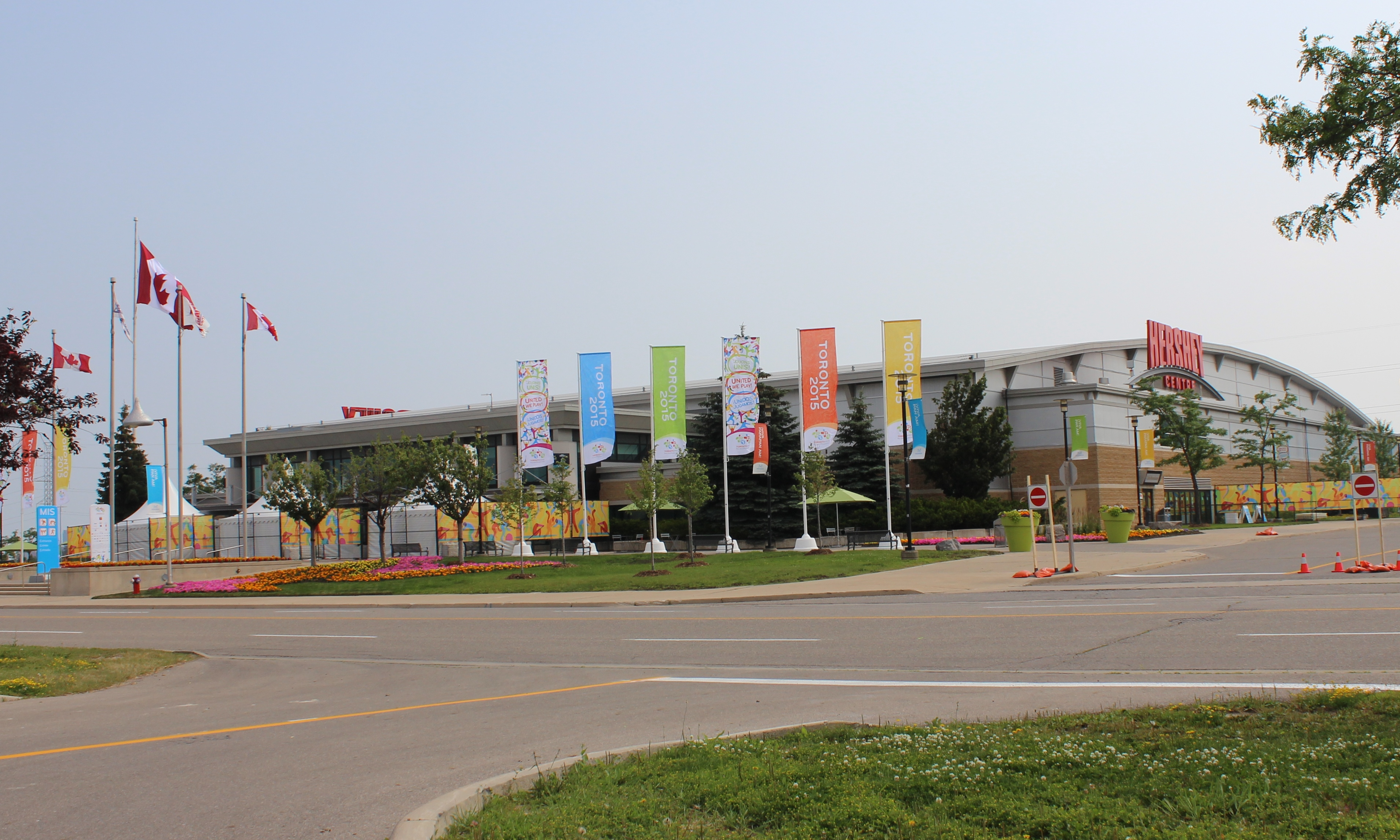
Entrance to the Hershey Centre during the 2015 Pan American Games

During the 2015 Pan American Games, it hosted the four combative sports of judo, karate, taekwondo and wrestling. During that time the centre was temporarily renamed the Mississauga Sports Centre due to naming rights. The venue also hosted the parapan sports of goalball, powerlifting and it also featured the debut of wheelchair rugby.

=== Other events ===
It was the venue for the inaugural 2002 Heritage Cup, an international indoor lacrosse tournament. The North American Roller Hockey Championships finals were held at Hershey Centre in July 2006, 2009 and 2013. The centre hosted the 2009 World Cup of Curling. A funeral for Peel Regional Police officer James Ochakovsky took place at the arena on March 9, 2010. It has also hosted the FIRST Robotics Competition, an international high school robotics competition. On September 22, 2000, it was the site of the only ECW show in Canada before the promotion's demise in 2001. On February 14, 2023, the venue hosted the state funeral for former Mississauga mayor Hazel McCallion. For the 2025 NLL season, the Toronto Rock returned to the Greater Toronto Area to play their home games at the Paramount Fine Foods Centre while their home arena FirstOntario Centre in Hamilton, Ontario undergoes renovations. In February 2026, the centre will host the 2026 Scotties Tournament of Hearts, the Canadian national women's curling championship.

=== COVID-19 mass vaccination site ===
In 2021 the venue was being used as a mass COVID-19 vaccination site.

== Mississauga and Iceland Fields ==
The grounds of the centre are also home to two outdoor field facilities, known as the Mississauga Fields and Iceland Fields.

== See also ==
- List of indoor arenas in Canada
