= Cycling at the 2019 Pan American Games – Men's sprint =

Men's sprint at the 2019 Pan American Games
- Venue: Velodrome
- Dates: August 2–3
- Competitors: 17 from 10 nations

Medalists
Gold medal	Nicholas Paul; Trinidad and Tobago
Silver medal	Kevin Quintero; Colombia
Bronze medal	Hersony Canelón; Venezuela

The men's sprint competition of the cycling events at the 2019 Pan American Games was held on August 2 and August 3 at the Velodrome.

Njisane Phillip of Trinidad and Tobago originally won the silver medal, but was disqualified for doping.

== Records ==
Prior to this competition, the existing world and Games records were as follows:

World record	Francois Pervis (FRA)	9.347	Aguascalientes, Mexico	6 December 2013
Games record	Njisane Phillip (TTO)	9.977	Guadalajara, Mexico	18 October 2011

== Schedule ==
Date	Time	Round
August 2, 2019	11:05	Qualification
August 2, 2019	11:42	Eighth-finals
August 2, 2019	12:00	Repechage
August 2, 2019	18:05	Quarterfinals
August 2, 2019	19:29	Race For 5th-8th Places
August 3, 2019	12:11	Semifinals
August 3, 2019	18:57	Finals

== Results ==
=== Qualification ===
Fastest 12 riders continue to the eighth-finals.

Rank	Name	Nation	Time	Notes
1	Nicholas Paul	Trinidad and Tobago	9.808	Q, GR
2	Njisane Phillip	Trinidad and Tobago	10.087	Q
3	Nick Wammes	Canada	10.100	Q
4	Kevin Quintero	Colombia	10.104	Q
5	Jaïr Tjon En Fa	Suriname	10.166	Q
6	Hersony Canelón	Venezuela	10.196	Q
7	Kacio Fonseca	Brazil	10.226	Q
8	Brandon Pineda	Guatemala	10.261	Q
9	Santiago Ramírez	Colombia	10.281	Q
10	Leandro Bottasso	Argentina	10.308	Q
11	César Marcano	Venezuela	10.364	Q
12	Joel Archambault	Canada	10.380	Q
13	Flávio Cipriano	Brazil	10.546	
14	Manuel Resendez	Mexico	10.549	
15	Juan Ruiz	Mexico	10.727	
16	Francis Cachique	Peru	11.697	
17	Robinson Ruiz	Peru	12.052	

=== Eighth-finals ===
The winners of each advance to the quarterfinals, while the losers advance to the repechage

Heat	Rank	Name	Nation	Time	Notes
1	1	Nicholas Paul	Trinidad and Tobago	10.482	Q
1	2	Joel Archambault	Canada		
2	1	Njisane Phillip	Trinidad and Tobago	10.824	Q
2	2	César Marcano	Venezuela		
3	1	Leandro Bottasso	Argentina	10.910	Q
3	2	Nick Wammes	Canada		
4	1	Kevin Quintero	Colombia	10.609	Q
4	2	Santiago Ramírez	Colombia		
5	1	Jaïr Tjon En Fa	Suriname	10.994	Q
5	2	Brandon Pineda	Guatemala		
6	1	Hersony Canelón	Venezuela	10.563	Q
6	2	Kacio Fonseca	Brazil		

=== Repechage ===
The winner of each advanced to the quarterfinals.

Heat	Rank	Name	Nation	Time	Notes
1	1	Santiago Ramírez	Colombia	10.635	Q
1	2	Joel Archambault	Canada		
1	3	Brandon Pineda	Guatemala		
2	1	Kacio Fonseca	Brazil	10.875	Q
2	2	Nick Wammes	Canada		
2	3	César Marcano	Venezuela		

=== Quarterfinals ===
The winner of each advanced to the semifinals.

Heat	Rank	Name	Nation	Race 1	Race 2	Decide	Notes
1	1	Nicholas Paul	Trinidad and Tobago	10.657	10.355		Q
1	2	Kacio Fonseca	Brazil				
2	1	Njisane Phillip	Trinidad and Tobago	10.492	10.324		Q
2	2	Santiago Ramírez	Colombia				
3	1	Hersony Canelón	Venezuela	10.904	10.731		Q
3	2	Leandro Bottasso	Argentina				
4	1	Kevin Quintero	Colombia	10.519	10.453		Q
4	2	Jaïr Tjon En Fa	Suriname				

=== Race for 5th–8th Places ===
Rank	Name	Nation	Time	Notes
DSQ	Kacio Fonseca	Brazil	10.649	
6	Jaïr Tjon En Fa	Suriname		
7	Santiago Ramírez	Colombia		
8	Leandro Bottasso	Argentina		

=== Semifinals ===
The winner of each advanced to the final.

Heat	Rank	Name	Nation	Race 1	Race 2	Decide	Notes
1	1	Nicholas Paul	Trinidad and Tobago	10.432	REL	10.472	Q
1	2	Kevin Quintero	Colombia		10.256		
2	1	Njisane Phillip	Trinidad and Tobago	10.313	10.318		Q
2	2	Hersony Canelón	Venezuela				

=== Finals ===
The final classification is determined in the medal finals.

Rank	Name	Nation	Race 1	Race 2	Decide	Notes
Gold medal final
1st place, gold medalist(s)	Nicholas Paul	Trinidad and Tobago	10.645	10.936		
DSQ	Njisane Phillip	Trinidad and Tobago				
Bronze medal final
2nd place, silver medalist(s)	Kevin Quintero	Colombia	10.466	10.556		
3rd place, bronze medalist(s)	Hersony Canelón	Venezuela				
