= Venezuela at the 2015 Pan American Games =

- IOC code: VEN
- NOC: Venezuelan Olympic Committee
- Website: www.cov.com.ve

in Toronto, Canada 10–26 July 2015
- Competitors: 353 in 27 sports
- Flag bearer (opening): Marvin Blanco
- Flag bearer (closing): Rosa Rodríguez
- Medals Ranked 8th: Gold 8 Silver 22 Bronze 20 Total 50

Pan American Games appearances (overview)
- 1951; 1955; 1959; 1963; 1967; 1971; 1975; 1979; 1983; 1987; 1991; 1995; 1999; 2003; 2007; 2011; 2015; 2019; 2023

Venezuela competed in the 2015 Pan American Games in Toronto, Canada from July 10 to 26, 2015.

Track and field athlete Marvin Blanco was the flagbearer of the country at the opening ceremony.

== Competitors ==
The following is the list of number of competitors from Venezuela participating in the Games.

Sport	Men	Women	Total
Archery	1	3	4
Athletics	13	14	27
Badminton	1	1	2
Baseball	0	18	18
Basketball	12	12	24
Beach volleyball	2	0	2
Bowling	2	2	4
Boxing	10	2	12
Canoeing	11	5	16
Cycling	13	8	21
Diving	3	1	4
Equestrian	8	3	11
Fencing	9	9	18
Golf	2	2	4
Gymnastics	3	8	11
Judo	5	7	12
Karate	5	5	10
Modern pentathlon	2	0	2
Racquetball	2	2	4
Roller sports	2	2	4
Rowing	4	3	7
Sailing	5	1	6
Shooting	10	5	15
Softball	15	0	15
Swimming	15	10	25
Synchronized swimming	—N/a	2	2
Table tennis	1	2	3
Taekwondo	4	3	7
Tennis	2	2	4
Triathlon	2	0	2
Water polo	13	13	26
Water skiing	1	0	1
Weightlifting	7	6	13
Wrestling	11	6	17
Total	198	160	358

== Medalists ==
The following competitors from Venezuela won medals at the games. In the by discipline sections below, medalists' names are bolded.

Medal	Name	Sport	Event	Date
Gold	Yaniuska Espinosa	Weightlifting	Women's +75kg	July 15
Gold	Jesús González Barrios	Weightlifting	Men's 105kg	July 15
Gold	Wuileixis Rivas	Wrestling	Men's Greco-Roman 66kg	July 15
Gold	Rosa Rodríguez	Athletics	Women's Hammer Throw	July 21
Gold	Rubén Limardo Gascon	Fencing	Men's Individual Épée	July 21
Gold	Silvio Fernández; Francisco Limardo; Rubén Limardo Gascon	Fencing	Men's Team Épée	July 24
Gold	Gabriel Maestre Perez	Boxing	Men's Welterweight	July 25
Gold	Miguel Ubeto Apointe	Cycling	Men's Road Race	July 25
Silver	Paola Perez Sierra	Swimming	Women's 10km Open Water	July 11
Silver	Génesis Rodríguez Gomez	Weightlifting	Women's 53kg	July 12
Silver	Yusleidy Figueroa Roldan	Weightlifting	Women's 58kg	July 12
Silver	Junior Sánchez Rivero	Weightlifting	Men's 77kg	July 13
Silver	Julio Iemma	Shooting	Men's 10m Air Rifle	July 13
Silver	Jessica López Arocha	Gymnastics	Women's Uneven Bars	July 14
Silver	Naryury Pérez Reveron	Weightlifting	Women's +75kg	July 15
Silver	Querys Perez	Wrestling	Men's Greco-Roman 85kg	July 15
Silver	Hersony Canelón Vera; César Marcano Sanchez; Ángel Pulgar Araujo	Cycling	Men's Team Sprint	July 16
Silver	Andreina Pinto	Swimming	Women's 400m Freestyle	July 17
Silver	Maria Acosta	Wrestling	Women's Freestyle 69 kg	July 17
Silver	Men's softball team: Arturo Acacio; Yeider Chirinos; Joan Colombo; Rafael Flores; Pedro Gonzalez; Ramon Jones; Jorge Lima; Edwin Linares; Tulio Linares; Iran Paez; Luiger Pinto; Kerlis Rivero; Rogelio Sequera; Erick Urbaneja; John Zambrano	Softball	Men's tournament	July 18
Silver	Hersony Canelón Vera	Cycling	Men's Keirin	July 19
Silver	Alejandra Benítez	Fencing	Women's Individual Sabre	July 20
Silver	Carlos Rivas	Taekwondo	Men's +80kg	July 22
Silver	Jovanni Martinez	Karate	Men's 60kg	July 23
Silver	Alexander Incastro	Karate	Men's 75kg	July 24
Silver	Eliana Lugo; Dayana Martinez; Maria Martinez	Fencing	Women's Team Épée	July 24
Silver	Amleto Monacelli	Bowling	Men's singles	July 25
Silver	Edgar Muñoz Mata	Boxing	Men's Super Heavyweight	July 25
Silver	Albert Ramírez Duran	Boxing	Men's Light Heavyweight	July 25
Silver	Andres Rodriguez	Equestrian	Individual Jumping	July 25
Bronze	Jesús López Sanchez	Weightlifting	Men's 62kg	July 11
Bronze	Douglas Gomez	Shooting	Men's 25m Rapid Fire Pistol	July 15
Bronze	Luillys Pérez	Wrestling	Men's Greco-Roman 98kg	July 16
Bronze	Betzabeth Argüello	Wrestling	Women's Freestyle 53kg	July 16
Bronze	Pedro Mejias	Wrestling	Men's Freestyle 57kg	July 17
Bronze	Cristian Sarco	Wrestling	Men's Freestyle 74kg	July 18
Bronze	Jose Diaz	Wrestling	Men's Freestyle 97kg	July 18
Bronze	Hersony Canelón Vera	Cycling	Men's Sprint	July 18
Bronze	Andreina Pinto	Swimming	Women's 800m Freestyle	July 18
Bronze	Maria Martinez	Fencing	Women's Individual Épée	July 21
Bronze	Yoel Finol Rivas	Boxing	Men's Light Flyweight	July 22
Bronze	Luis Arcon Diaz	Boxing	Men's Light Welterweight	July 22
Bronze	Endry Saavedra Pinto	Boxing	Men's Middleweight	July 22
Bronze	Juan Mendez	Water skiing	Men's Wakeboard	July 22
Bronze	Patricia De Faria; Karen Marcano	Bowling	Women's doubles	July 23
Bronze	Alejandra Benítez; Milagros Pastran; Shia Rodriguez	Fencing	Women's Team Sabre	July 23
Bronze	Women's baseball team: Migreily Angulo; Sor Brito; Giddelys Cumaná; Osmari Garcia; Lelis Gomez; Kerlys Perez; Esquia Rengel; Maria Rincon; Patricia Segovia; Ofelia Arrieche; Dayvis Cazorla; Ingrid Escobar; Daily Gimenez; Oriannys Hernandez; Marianne Perez; Leonela Reyes; Astrid Rodriguez; Maigleth Torres	Baseball	Women's Tournament	July 25
Bronze	Cesar Herrera	Karate	Men's 84kg	July 25
Bronze	Yeisy Piña Ordaz	Karate	Women's +68kg	July 25
Bronze	Omaira Molina	Karate	Women's 68kg	July 25

Medals by sport
**Sport**	1st place, gold medalist(s)	2nd place, silver medalist(s)	3rd place, bronze medalist(s)	**Total**
Athletics	1	0	0	1
Baseball	0	0	1	1
Bowling	0	1	1	2
Boxing	1	2	3	6
Cycling	1	2	1	4
Equestrian	0	1	0	1
Fencing	2	2	2	6
Gymnastics	0	1	0	1
Karate	0	2	3	5
Shooting	0	1	1	2
Softball	0	1	0	1
Swimming	0	2	1	3
Taekwondo	0	1	0	1
Water Skiing	0	0	1	1
Weightlifting	2	4	1	7
Wrestling	1	2	5	8
Total	8	22	20	50

Medals by day
**Day**	1st place, gold medalist(s)	2nd place, silver medalist(s)	3rd place, bronze medalist(s)	**Total**
July 11	0	1	1	2
July 12	0	2	0	2
July 13	0	2	0	2
July 14	0	1	0	1
July 15	3	2	1	6
July 16	0	1	2	3
July 17	0	2	1	3
July 18	0	1	4	5
July 19	0	1	0	1
July 20	0	1	0	1
July 21	2	0	1	3
July 22	0	1	4	5
July 23	0	1	2	3
July 24	1	2	0	3
July 25	2	4	4	10
Total	8	22	20	50

Medals by gender
**Gender**	1st place, gold medalist(s)	2nd place, silver medalist(s)	3rd place, bronze medalist(s)	**Total**
Male	6	13	12	31
Female	2	9	8	19
Total	8	22	20	50

Multiple medalists
**Name**	**Sport**	1st place, gold medalist(s)	2nd place, silver medalist(s)	3rd place, bronze medalist(s)	**Total**
Alejandra Benítez	Fencing	0	1	1	2
Hersony Canelón Vera	Cycling	0	2	1	3
Rubén Limardo Gascon	Fencing	2	0	0	2
Maria Martinez	Fencing	0	1	1	2
Andreina Pinto	Swimming	0	1	1	2

== Archery ==
Venezuela qualified one male and three female archers based on its performance at the 2014 Pan American Championships.

Athlete	Event	Ranking Round		Round of 32	Round of 16	Quarterfinals	Semifinals	Final / BM	Rank
Athlete	Event	Score	Seed	Opposition Score	Opposition Score	Opposition Score	Opposition Score	Opposition Score	Rank
Elias Malave	Men's individual	650	14	Alvarez (ECU); W 7–1	Ellison (USA); L 5–6	Did not advance			
Leidys Brito	Women's individual	639	7	Bermudez Moreno (CRC); W 6–2	Sarduy (CUB); L 5–6	Did not advance			
Mayra Mendez	Women's individual	590	22	Pritchard (USA); L 1–7	Did not advance				
Verona Villegas	Women's individual	594	20	Nikitin (BRA); L 0–6	Did not advance				
Leidys Brito; Mayra Mendez; Verona Villegas	Women's team	1823	5	—N/a	Bye	Brazil; W 5–1	Mexico; L 2–6	United States; L 4–5	4

== Badminton ==
Venezuela qualified a team of two athletes (one man and one woman).

Athlete	Event	Round of 64	Round of 32	Round of 16	Quarterfinals	Semifinals	Final	Rank
Athlete	Event	Opposition Result	Opposition Result	Opposition Result	Opposition Result	Opposition Result	Opposition Result	Rank
Jesús Sánchez Lima	Men's singles	Bye	Castillo (MEX); L (10–21, 7–21)	Did not advance				
Damaris Ortiz Parada	Women's singles	Bye	Wang (USA); L (4–21, 6–21)	Did not advance				
Damaris Ortiz Parada; Jesús Sánchez Lima	Doubles	—N/a	Reid / Williams (JAM); L (14–21, 14–21)	Did not advance				

== Baseball ==
Venezuela qualified a women's baseball team of 18 athletes.

=== Women's tournament ===
Roster

The Venezuela women's national baseball team roster for the 2015 Pan American Games (as of 19 July 2015).

- Migreily Angulo (C)
- Ofelia Arrieche (OF)
- Sor Brito (IF)
- Dayvis Cazorla (P)
- Giddelys Cumana (P)
- Ingrid Escobar (IF)
- Osmari Garcia (C)
- Daily Gimenez (IF)
- Lelis Gomez (IF)
- Oriannys Hernandez (P)
- Kerlys Pérez (P)
- Marianne Pérez (OF)
- Esquia Rengel (U)
- Leonela Reyes (OF)
- Maria Rincon (P)
- Astrid Rodriguez (U)
- Patricia Segovia (U)
- Maigleth Torres (IF)

Legend: C = Catcher, IF = Infielder, OF = Outfielder, P = Pitcher, U = Utility fielder

Group A

Pos	Team	Pld	W	L	RF	RA	RD	PCT	GB	Qualification
1	United States	4	4	0	33	7	+26	1.000	—	Advanced to the Gold medal match
2	Canada	4	3	1	26	9	+17	.750	1	Advance to the Bronze medal match
3	Venezuela	4	2	2	32	30	+2	.500	2	Advance to the Bronze medal match
4	Puerto Rico	4	1	3	17	27	−10	.250	3	
5	Cuba	4	0	4	8	43	−35	.000	4	

20 July 2015; 15:00	United States	10–6	Venezuela	President’s Choice Ajax Pan Am Ballpark, Ajax; Attendance: 847
20 July 2015; 15:00		Boxscore		President’s Choice Ajax Pan Am Ballpark, Ajax; Attendance: 847

21 July 2015; 19:00	Venezuela	3–9	Canada	President’s Choice Ajax Pan Am Ballpark, Ajax; Attendance: 1,375
21 July 2015; 19:00		Boxscore		President’s Choice Ajax Pan Am Ballpark, Ajax; Attendance: 1,375

23 July 2015; 15:00	Cuba	2–13	Venezuela	President’s Choice Ajax Pan Am Ballpark, Ajax; Attendance: 977
23 July 2015; 15:00		Boxscore		President’s Choice Ajax Pan Am Ballpark, Ajax; Attendance: 977

24 July 2015; 15:00	Venezuela	10–9	Puerto Rico	President’s Choice Ajax Pan Am Ballpark, Ajax; Attendance: 1,803
24 July 2015; 15:00		Boxscore		President’s Choice Ajax Pan Am Ballpark, Ajax; Attendance: 1,803

Bronze medal match

25 July 2015; 19:00	(bronze) Venezuela	1–6	Canada	President’s Choice Ajax Pan Am Ballpark, Ajax; Attendance: 2,847
25 July 2015; 19:00		Boxscore		President’s Choice Ajax Pan Am Ballpark, Ajax; Attendance: 2,847

== Basketball ==
Venezuela qualified men's and women's teams, each with 12 athletes, for a total of 24.

=== Men's tournament ===
The Venezuela men's national basketball team roster for the 2015 Pan American Games.

Venezuela men's national basketball team – 2015 Pan American Games roster
Players
Coaches

Pos.	No.	Name	Age – Date of birth	Height	Club
C	0	Echenique, Gregory	24 – 23 Nov 1990	2.08 m (6 ft 10 in)	(Venezuela) Guaros de Lara
C	4	Marriaga, Miguel	31 – 6 Jun 1984	2.08 m (6 ft 10 in)	(Venezuela) Toros de Aragua
PG	5	Vargas, Gregory	29 – 18 Feb 1986	1.82 m (6 ft 0 in)	(Israel) Maccabi Haifa
SG	6	Cox, John	34 – 6 Jul 1981	1.96 m (6 ft 5 in)	(France) STB Le Havre
SF	7	Zamora, Jhornan	26 – 30 Jan 1989	1.93 m (6 ft 4 in)	(Paraguay) Club Sol de América
PG	8	Cubillán, David	27 – 27 Jul 1987	1.83 m (6 ft 0 in)	(Venezuela) Trotamundos de Carabobo
SF	10	Vargas, José Gregorio	33 – 23 Jan 1982	1.95 m (6 ft 5 in)	(Venezuela) Marinos de Anzoátegui
PF	11	Bethelmy, Luis	28 – 14 Oct 1986	2.03 m (6 ft 8 in)	(Venezuela) Guaros de Lara
PF	15	Ruiz, Miguel	24 – 10 Dec 1990	2.02 m (6 ft 8 in)	(Venezuela) Trotamundos de Carabobo
PG	19	Guillent, Heissler	28 – 17 Dec 1986	1.86 m (6 ft 1 in)	(Venezuela) Guaros de Lara
SG	20	Lewis, Dwight	27 – 7 Oct 1987	1.98 m (6 ft 6 in)	(Venezuela) Trotamundos de Carabobo
PF	43	Colmenares, Néstor	27 – 5 Sep 1987	2.03 m (6 ft 8 in)	(Venezuela) Cocodrilos de Caracas

Head coach

(Argentina) Néstor García

Legend

- Age – as of 16 July 2015
- Club – before start of Games

Group A

Team	Pld	W	L	PF	PA	PD	Pts	Qualification
Brazil	3	3	0	264	206	+58	6	Qualified for the semifinals
United States	3	2	1	270	225	+45	5	Qualified for the semifinals
Puerto Rico	3	1	2	218	266	−48	4	
Venezuela	3	0	3	198	253	−55	3	

21 July 2015
21:00

Report

United States	85–62	Venezuela
Scoring by quarter: 18–18, 15–23, 26–12, 26–9
Pts: Wilkins 21; Rebs: Tarczewski 13; Asts: Brown 2		Pts: Cox, Bethelmy 14; Rebs: Bethelmy, Colmenares 8 Asts: Guillén 3

Ryerson Athletic Centre, Toronto

22 July 2015
13:30

Report

Venezuela	64–79	Brazil
Scoring by quarter: 9–22, 14–15, 20–17, 21–25
Pts: Cox, Colmenares 16; Rebs: Vargas Diaz 4 Asts: Vargas 3		Pts: Benite 14; Rebs: Lima 8 Asts: Luz 4

Ryerson Athletic Centre, Toronto

23 July 2015
13:30

Report

Puerto Rico	89–72	Venezuela
Scoring by quarter: 23–13, 23–25, 15–23, 28–11
Pts: Barea 27; Rebs: Clemente 7 Asts: Barea 6		Pts: Lewis 19; Rebs: Colmenares 8 Asts: Vargas, Vargas Diaz 3

Ryerson Athletic Centre, Toronto

Seventh place match

24 July 2015
10:30

Report

Venezuela	83–59	Mexico
Scoring by quarter: 16–6, 28–23, 19–15, 19–15
Pts: Cox 24; Rebs: Vargas 6 Asts: Vargas 4		Pts: Gonzalez, Ramos 11; Rebs: Gonzalez, Gutiérrez 7 Asts: Cruz 4

Ryerson Athletic Centre, Toronto

=== Women's tournament ===
The Venezuela women's national basketball team roster for the 2015 Pan American Games.

Venezuela women's national basketball team – 2015 Pan American Games roster
Players
Coaches

Pos.	No.	Name	Age – Date of birth	Height	Club
F	4	Landaeta, Mayerling	22 – 25 Jan 1993	1.82 m (6 ft 0 in)
G	5	Silva, Roselis	23 – 1 Aug 1991	1.65 m (5 ft 5 in)
SF	6	Corrales, Yosimar	25 – 5 Feb 1990	1.80 m (5 ft 11 in)
C	7	García, Ana	32 – 24 Nov 1982	1.92 m (6 ft 4 in)
SF	8	Márquez, Ivaney	32 – 17 Mar 1983	1.79 m (5 ft 10 in)
SF	9	Wallen, Daniela	20 – 4 Apr 1995	1.77 m (5 ft 10 in)
F	10	Ortega, Lusiana	25 – 22 Sep 1989	1.73 m (5 ft 8 in)
PG	11	Durán, Mariana	22 – 12 May 1993	1.68 m (5 ft 6 in)
F	12	Blanco Piñango, Cleyder Oderlin	25 – 12 Jan 1990	1.83 m (6 ft 0 in)
PF	13	Garate, Marielka	20 – 7 Feb 1995	1.83 m (6 ft 0 in)
PG	14	Pérez, Waleska	21 – 17 Feb 1994	1.79 m (5 ft 10 in)
F	32	Polanco Áñez, Cynthia Maria	29 – 20 Nov 1985	1.83 m (6 ft 0 in)

Head coach

- Óscar Silva

Legend

- Age – as of 15 July 2015
- Club – before start of Games

Group B

Team	Pld	W	L	PF	PA	PD	Pts	Qualification
Canada	3	3	0	245	164	+81	6	Qualified for the semifinals
Cuba	3	2	1	209	188	+21	5	Qualified for the semifinals
Argentina	3	1	2	200	209	−9	4	
Venezuela	3	0	3	168	261	−93	3	

16 July 2015
18:00

Report

Canada	101–38	Venezuela
Scoring by quarter: 23–8, 25–11, 29–16, 24–3
Pts: Murphy 15; Rebs: Murphy 9 Asts: Langlois 6		Pts: Silva Serrano 13; Rebs: Perez Abreu 5 Asts: Garate Martinez 2

Ryerson Athletic Centre, Toronto

17 July 2015
10:30

Report

Venezuela	62–73	Cuba
Scoring by quarter: 18–21, 16–13, 11–20, 17–19
Pts: Silva Serrano 22; Rebs: Blanco Piñango, Perez Abreu 9 Asts: Wallen Morillo 2		Pts: Amargo 18; Rebs: Oquendo 12; Asts: Casanova 8

Ryerson Athletic Centre, Toronto

18 July 2015
10:30

Report

Argentina	87–68	Venezuela
Scoring by quarter: 23–15, 16–13, 21–22, 27–18
Pts: Boquete 18; Rebs: Santana 9 Asts: Gretter 7		Pts: Silva Serrano 20; Rebs: Perez Abreu 8 Asts: Marquez Agudo 3

Ryerson Athletic Centre, Toronto

Seventh place match

19 July 2015
10:30

Report

Dominican Republic	56–72	Venezuela
Scoring by quarter: 18–23, 18–19, 7–20, 13–10
Pts: Monsac 13; Rebs: Monsac 13; Asts: Zapata 3		Pts: Silva Serrano 31; Rebs: Corrales Gomez 9 Asts: Perez Abreu 13

Ryerson Athletic Centre, Toronto

== Beach volleyball ==
Venezuela qualified a men's pair.

Athlete	Event	Preliminary round			Quarterfinals	9th to 12th place	9th to 10th place	
Athlete	Event	Opposition Score	Opposition Score	Opposition Score	Opposition Score	Opposition Score	Opposition Score	Rank
Jackson Henriquez; Jesús Villafañe	Men's	Ontiveros / Virgen (MEX); L (15–21-18–21)	Araujo / Magliano (BRA); L (15–21, 21–18, 10–15)	Daniel / De Cuba (ARU); W (21–14, 21–13)	Haddock / Rodriguez (PUR); L (19–21, 21–19, 13–15)	Evans / Satterfield (USA); L (14–21, 19–21)	Whitfield / Williams (TTO); L (DNS)	10

== Canoeing ==
=== Slalom ===
Venezuela qualified the following athletes:

Athlete(s)	Event	Preliminary						Semifinal		Final	
Athlete(s)	Event	Run 1	Rank	Run 2	Rank	Best	Rank	Time	Rank	Time	Rank
José Silva	Men's C-1	105.05	5	101.64	5	101.64	5 Q	141.83	5 Q	111.99	5
Alexis Perez; José Silva	Men's C-2	132.89	5	125.14	2	125.14	5 Q	155.40	3 Q	183.26	4
Alexis Perez	Men's K-1	99.40	3	96.75	3	96.75	4 Q	102.41	5 Q	98.38	4
Siranush Mamed Paredes	Women's C-1	695.24	6	659.18	5	659.15	6	Did not advance			
Siranush Mamed Paredes	Women's K-1	195.96	6	579.53	7	195.96	6 Q	819.65	7	Did not advance	

=== Sprint ===
Venezuela qualified 13 athletes in the sprint discipline.

Men

Athlete	Event	Heats		Semifinals		Final	
Athlete	Event	Time	Rank	Time	Rank	Time	Rank
Ronny Ratia	C-1 200m	42.354	2	Bye		42.931	5
Edwar Paredes Luciano; José Solano Perez	C-2 1000m	—N/a				4:08.764	5
Antonio Oropeza Suarez	K-1 200m	37.454	3 QF	Bye		41.591	9
Antonio Oropeza Suarez; José Ramos Ramos	K-2 200m	—N/a				34.864	5
Ray Acuña Sanchez; Cristian Canache Cabeza; Jesus Colmenares Lizardo; Juan Montoya Flores	K-4 1000m	—N/a				3:13.484	7

Women

Athlete	Event	Heats		Semifinal		Final	
Athlete	Event	Time	Rank	Time	Rank	Time	Rank
Mara Guerrero Gil	K-1 500m	2:07.832	5 QS	2:08.211	4	Did not advance	
Zulmarys Sánchez Mendoza	K-1 200m	45.838	2 QF	Bye		45.556	4
Yocelin Canache Cabera; Mara Guerrero Gil; Angelica Jimenez Castillo; Zulmarys Sánchez Mendoza	K-4 500m	—N/a				1:43.647	6

Qualification Legend: QF = Qualify to final; QS = Qualify to semifinal

== Cycling ==
Venezuela qualified 21 cyclists (13 male and 8 female). Some cyclists competed across more than one discipline.

Key
Note – Ranks given for cycling events are for all heats
Q = Qualified for the next round
DNF = Did not finish

=== BMX ===
Athlete	Event	Qualifying		Time Trial Super-Final		Quarterfinal		Semifinal		Final	
Athlete	Event	Result	Rank	Result	Rank	Points	Rank	Result	Rank	Points	Rank
Enrique Diaz Cedeno	Men's individual	1:16.720	21	Did not advance		16	20	Did not advance			
Jefferson Milano Duran	Men's individual	38.510	13 Q	38.522	11	12 Q	14	38.406	=10	Did not advance	
Stefany Hernández	Women's individual	40.890	3 Q	40.863	2	—N/a		11	6 Q	DNF	

=== Mountain biking ===
Athlete	Event	Time	Rank
Jonathan Mejias	Cross-country	1:40:01	12

=== Road ===
Key
DNF = Did not finish
DNS = Did not start

Men

Athlete	Event	Final	
Athlete	Event	Time	Rank
Enrique Diaz Cedeño	Road race	3:46:34	6
Yonder Godoy	Road race	DNF	
Yonder Godoy	Time trial	48:41.70	10
Xavier Quevedo	Road race	3:46:35	11
Miguel Ubeto	Road race	3:46:26	1st place, gold medalist(s)

Women

Athlete	Event	Final	
Athlete	Event	Time	Rank
Jennifer Cesar	Road race	2:07:52	14
Jennifer Cesar	Time trial	28:34.50	7
Leidimar Suarez Medina	Time trial	29:23.32	10
Zuralmy Rivas	Road race	2:07:52	15
Gleydimar Tapia	Road race	2:07:52	10

=== Track ===
Individual sprint

Athlete	Event	Qualification		Round 1	Repechage 1	Quarterfinals	Semifinals	Final / BM	
Athlete	Event	Time	Rank	Opposition Time Speed (km/h)	Opposition Time Speed (km/h)	Opposition Time Speed (km/h)	Opposition Time Speed (km/h)	Opposition Time Speed (km/h)	Rank
Hersony Canelón	Men's sprint	10.041	3 Q	Freitas (BRA); W	Bye	Baranoski (USA); W	Barrette (CAN); L	Cipriano (BRA); W	3rd place, bronze medalist(s)
Ángel Pulgar	Men's sprint	10.605	14	Did not advance					
Mariaesthela Vilera	Women's sprint	11.849	7 Q	García (COL); W	Bye	Gaviria (COL); L	Did not advance		6

Keirin

Key
Q = Qualified for the next round

Athlete	Event	1st round	Final/Classification
Athlete	Event	Rank	Rank
Hersony Canelón	Men's keirin	2 Q	2nd place, silver medalist(s)
Mariaesthela Vilera	Women's keirin	4	7

Team pursuit and sprint

Key
Q = Qualified for the next round
QG = Qualified for the gold medal race
QB = Qualified for the bronze medal race
QC = Qualified for the classification round

Athlete	Event	Qualification		First round		Final / BM	
Athlete	Event	Time	Rank	Opponent Time	Rank	Opponent Time	Rank
Manuel Briceño Barreto; Víctor Moreno Cevilla; Jhoan Paez Camacho; Yosvangs Rojas	Men's team pursuit	4:09.450	4 Q	Colombia; L 4:09.458	4 QB	Canada; L 4:07.777	4
Hersony Canelón; César Marcano; Ángel Pulgar	Men's team sprint	44.715	2 QG	—N/a		Canada; L 45.087	2nd place, silver medalist(s)
Jennifer Cesar; Zuralmy Rivas; Leidimar Suarez Medina; Gleydimar Tapia	Women's team pursuit	4:44.176	5 Q	Guatemala; W 4:42.692	5 QC	Cuba; W 4:41.652	5
Angie González; Mariaesthela Vilera	Women's team sprint	35.318	5	—N/a		Did not advance	

Omnium

Athlete	Event	Scratch race		Individual pursuit		Elimination race		Time trial		Flying lap		Points race		Total points	Rank
Athlete	Event	Rank	Points	Rank	Points	Rank	Points	Rank	Points	Rank	Points	Rank	Points	Total points	Rank
Enrique Diaz Cedeno	Men's omnium	32	5	28	7	34	4	32	5	26	8	20	8	172	8
Angie González	Women's omnium	38	2	28	7	34	4	36	4	34	4	6	6	176	6

== Diving ==
Venezuela qualified four divers (three men and one woman).

Athlete	Event	Preliminary		Final	
Athlete	Event	Points	Rank	Points	Rank
Alfredo Colmenarez	Men's 3 m springboard	384.95	5 Q	359.20	12
Robert Páez	Men's 3 m springboard	320.80	15	Did not advance	
Robert Páez	Men's 10 m platform	348.05	11 Q	348.25	11
Edickson Contreras; Robert Páez	Men's synchronized 3 m springboard	—N/a		343.05	6
Maria Betancourt	Women's 3 m springboard	190.35	14	Did not advance	

== Fencing ==
Venezuela qualified 18 fencers (9 men, 9 women).

Men

Athlete	Event	Pool Round		Round of 16	Quarterfinals	Semifinals	Final / BM	
Athlete	Event	Result	Seed	Opposition Score	Opposition Score	Opposition Score	Opposition Score	Rank
Francisco Limardo	Épée	4V – 1D	4	Dominguez (ARG); L 9–10	Did not advance			
Rubén Limardo Gascon	Épée	4V – 1D	2	Brinck-Croteau (CAN); W 15–0	Bratton (USA); W 15–8	Pryor (USA); W 15–9	Dominguez (ARG); W 15–6	1st place, gold medalist(s)
Silvio Fernández; Francisco Limardo; Rubén Limardo Gascon	Épée Team	—N/a			Brazil; W 45–28	Cuba; W 3–2	United States; W 45–40	1st place, gold medalist(s)
Cesar Aguirre	Foil	1V – 4D	=12	Leal (VEN); W 15–6	Tanamachi (MEX); L 6–15	Did not advance		
Antonio Leal	Foil	4V – 1D	5	Aguirre (VEN); L 6–5	Did not advance			
Cesar Aguirre; Antonio Leal; Victor Leon	Foil Team	—N/a			Canada; W (45–42)	Brazil; L (34–42)	Mexico; L (29–45)	4
Jesus Carvajal	Sabre	1V – 4D	=13	Agrestra (BRA); L (9–15)	Did not advance			
José Quintero	Sabre	2V – 1D	=10	Dershwitz (USA); L (6–15)	Did not advance			
Jesus Carvajal; José Quintero; Eliecer Romero	Sabre Team	—N/a			Mexico; W (45–34)	Canada; L (40–45)	Argentina; L (42–45)	4

Women

Athlete	Event	Pool Round		Round of 16	Quarterfinals	Semifinals	Final / BM	
Athlete	Event	Result	Seed	Opposition Score	Opposition Score	Opposition Score	Opposition Score	Rank
Eliana Lugo	Épée	2V – 3D	14	Costa (BRA); W (15–14)	Moellhausen (BRA); L (5–15)	Did not advance		
Maria Martinez	Épée	4V – 1D	5	Mateo (DOM); W (15–9)	Trzopek (USA); W (15–14)	Ramirez Peguero (DOM); L (10–15)	Did not advance	3rd place, bronze medalist(s)
Eliana Lugo; Dayana Martinez; Maria Martinez	Épée Team	—N/a			Colombia; W (45–38)	Cuba; W (37–31)	United States; L (22–29)	2nd place, silver medalist(s)
Isis Gimenez	Foil	3V – 2D	6	Silva (CHI); W (15–10)	Van Erven Garcia (COL); L (3–15)	Did not advance		
Liz Rivero	Foil	1V – 4D	=15	Kiefer (USA); L (5–15)	Did not advance			
Isis Gimenez; Emiliana Rivero; Liz Rivero	Foil Team	—N/a			Mexico; L (33–45)	Argentina; W (45–40)	Cuba; W (40–39)	5
Alejandra Benítez	Sabre	3V – 2D	10	Goulet (CUB); W (15–10)	Grench (PAN); W (15–8)	Perez Maurice (ARG); W (15–14)	Wozniak (USA); L (13–15)	2nd place, silver medalist(s)
Shia Rodriguez	Sabre	1V – 4D	17	Did not advance				
Alejandra Benítez; Milagros Pastran; Shia Rodriguez	Sabre Team	—N/a			Dominican Republic; W (45–36)	Mexico; L (36–45)	Cuba; W (45–38)	3rd place, bronze medalist(s)

== Golf ==
Venezuela qualified a full team of four golfers.

Athlete(s)	Event	Final					
Athlete(s)	Event	Round 1	Round 2	Round 3	Round 4	Total	Rank
Jorge García	Men's individual	70	74	68	74	286 (–17)	=8
Gustavo Morantes	Men's individual	71	75	74	75	295 (+7)	17
Veronica Felibert	Women's individual	79	78	74	73	304 (+16)	13
Ariadna Fonseca	Women's individual	82	75	74	76	307 (+19)	=16
Jorge García; Gustavo Morantes; Veronica Felibert; Ariadna Fonseca	Mixed team	149	149	142	147	587 (+11)	7

== Gymnastics ==
=== Artistic ===
Venezuela qualified 7 athletes.

Men
Team & Individual

Athlete	Event	Qualification								Final							
Athlete	Event	Apparatus						Total	Rank	Apparatus						Total	Rank
Athlete	Event	F	PH	R	V	PB	HB	Total	Rank	F	PH	R	V	PB	HB	Total	Rank
Jostyn Fuenmayor	All-around	12.500	12.250	13.900	13.950	13.850	12.500	78.950 Q	17	12.900	12.500	13.450	13.850	13.850	11.400	77.950	16
Junior Rojo Mendoza	All-around	11.600	11.850	12.350	13.900	14.050	13.650	77.400 Q	21	13.300	13.100	13.000	14.800	13.750	13.200	81.150	12
Jose Fuentes	All-around		14.200	13.150	12.800	14.100	12.150	66.400	34	Did not advance							
Total	Team	24.100	38.300	39.400	40.650	42.000	38.300	—N/a								222.750	9

Qualification Legend: Q = Qualified to apparatus final

Women
Team & Individual

Athlete	Event	Qualification						Final					
Athlete	Event	Apparatus				Total	Rank	Apparatus				Total	Rank
Athlete	Event	F	V	UB	BB	Total	Rank	F	V	UB	BB	Total	Rank
Katriel De Sousa	All-around	13.650	11.050	11.050	12.800	48.550 Q	22	13.600	10.900	11.550	13.000	49.050	17
Eliana Gonzalez	All-around	13.900	11.450			25.350	50	Did not advance					
Jessica López	All-around		14.300	13.400		27.700	45	Did not advance					
Paola Marquez	All-around	13.400		12.700	11.600	37.700	36	Did not advance					
Ivet Rojas Galean	All-around	14.000	12.100	12.100	13.00	51.200 Q	17			12.600		12.600	24
Total	Team	41.550	37.850	38.200	37.400	—N/a						155.000	9

Qualification Legend: Q = Qualified to apparatus final

=== Rhythmic ===
Venezuela qualified two athletes.

Individual

Athlete	Event	Final					
Athlete	Event	Hoop	Ball	Clubs	Ribbon	Total	Rank
Grisbel Lopez	Individual	10.383	13.375	12.242	12.667	47.667	11
Michelle Sanchez	Individual	14.450	13.567	13.283	13.617	54.917	9

Qualification Legend: Q = Qualified to apparatus final

Individual finals

Athlete	Event	Final	
Athlete	Event	Total	Rank
Michelle Sanchez	Ball	13.308	8
Michelle Sanchez	Hoop	13.433	8

=== Trampoline ===
Venezuela qualified one athlete.

Athlete	Event	Qualification		Final	
Athlete	Event	Score	Rank	Score	Rank
Alida Rojo Mendoza	Women's	85.975	4 Q	43.450	8

== Judo ==
Venezuela qualified twelve judokas (five men and seven women).

Men

Athlete	Event	Round of 16	Quarterfinals	Semifinals	Repechage	Final / BM	
Athlete	Event	Opposition Result	Opposition Result	Opposition Result	Opposition Result	Opposition Result	Rank
Javier Guédez	−60 kg	Bye	Preciado (ECU); L 001S2–100	Did not advance	Pessoa (CAN); L 000S1–010S2	Did not advance	7
Sergio Mattey	−66 kg	Verdugo (ECU); W 110–000S1	Mateo (DOM); W 010S3–000S1	Chibana (BRA); L 000–100	Bye	González (ARG); L 001–100	5
Nelson Martinez	−90 kg	Gomera (DOM); W 001S1–001S2	Cárdenas (MEX); L 000S1–001S1	Did not advance	Larsen (USA); L 000–010S2	Did not advance	7
Antony Peňa	−100 kg	Arroyo (PER); W 101S1–000S3	Corrêa (BRA); L 000S2–100	Did not advance	Esquivel (MEX); W 100S2–000	Armenteros (CUB); L 000S1–101	5
Pedro Pineda	+100 kg	Bye	Pileta (HON); W 100S3–000S4	Corrêa (BRA); L 000S4–000	Bye	Cuevas (MEX); L 000S4–100S3	5

Women

Athlete	Event	Round of 16	Quarterfinals	Semifinals	Repechage	Final / BM	
Athlete	Event	Opposition Result	Opposition Result	Opposition Result	Opposition Result	Opposition Result	Rank
Andrea Gomes	−48 kg	Bye	Brigida (BRA); L 000S2–000S1	Did not advance	Sánchez (DOM); L 000S1–100	Did not advance	7
Jormry Palma	−52 kg	Díaz (ECU); L 000–011	Did not advance				
Anriquelis Barrios	−57 kg	Rodriguez (PUR); W 100–000	Malloy (USA); L 000S2–100S1	Did not advance	Amaris (COL); W 100S2–000	Silva (BRA); L 000S1–012	5
Maria Arteaga	−63 kg	Bye	Martin (USA); L 000–100S1	Did not advance	Velasco (COL); L 000–100	Did not advance	7
Elvismar Rodríguez	−70 kg	Bye	Portela (BRA); L 000–100S1	Did not advance	Chala (ECU); L 010S1–011S1	Did not advance	7
Andrymar Alfonzo	−78 kg	Chalá (ECU); L 000S3–000S2	Did not advance				
Emileidys Lopez	+78 kg	—N/a	Altheman (BRA); L 000–101	Did not advance	da Cunha (ARG); L 001S1–101S1	Did not advance	7

== Karate ==
Venezuela qualified a full team of ten karatekas.

Men

Athlete	Event	Round robin				Semifinals	Final	
Athlete	Event	Opposition Result	Opposition Result	Opposition Result	Rank	Opposition Result	Opposition Result	Rank
Jovanni Martínez	–60 kg	Sosa (DOM); W 6–0	Miyazaki (USA); W 6–2	Chung (CAN); W 2–1	1 Q	Rendón (COL); W 5–1	Brose (BRA); L 0–4	2nd place, silver medalist(s)
Andrés Madera	–67 kg	Ferreras (DOM); L 1–2	Vargas (MEX); L 2–5	Ramírez (COL); W 3–2	3	Did not advance		5
Alexander Nicastro	–75 kg	Gustavo (DOM); D 5–5	Landázuri (COL); D 2–2	Boily-Martineau (CAN); W 4–2	1 Q	Icasati (ARG); W 2–0	Scott (USA); L 4–3	2nd place, silver medalist(s)
César Herrera	–84 kg	Merino (ESA); W 1–0	Acevedo (CHI); W 3–1	Sinani (CAN); W 6–5	1 Q	Amargós (ARG); L 1–7	Did not advance	3rd place, bronze medalist(s)
Ángel Aponte	+84 kg	Recouso (ARG); D 1–1	Tiril (CUB); L 3–6	Irr (USA); L 1–2	3	Did not advance		7

Women

Athlete	Event	Round robin				Semifinals	Final	
Athlete	Event	Opposition Result	Opposition Result	Opposition Result	Rank	Opposition Result	Opposition Result	Rank
Aurimer Campos	–50 kg	Virk (CAN); L 0–5	Villanueva (DOM); L 1–2	Huamaní (PER); W 1–0	3	Did not advance		5
Genesis Navarrete	–55 kg	Campbell (CAN); L 0–5	Kumizaki (BRA); L 1–4	León (DOM); W 2–0	3	Did not advance		5
Franyerlin Brito	–61 kg	Lepin (CHI); L 0–8	Arreola (MEX); D 0–0	Orbon (USA); W 1–0	3	Did not advance		5
Omaira Molina	–68 kg	Caballero (MEX); D 4–4	Salamanca (CHI); W 2–0	Landry (CAN); W 2–0	2 Q	Brozulatto (BRA); L 1–3	Did not advance	3rd place, bronze medalist(s)
Yeisy Pina Ordaz	+68 kg	Quintal (MEX); W 4–0	Echever (ECU); L 2–4	Lugo (ARG); W 3–0	2 Q	Boisvenue (CAN); L 1–1	Did not advance	3rd place, bronze medalist(s)

== Modern pentathlon ==
Venezuela qualified two male modern pentathletes.

Athlete	Event	Fencing (Épée One Touch)			Swimming (200m Freestyle)			Riding (Show Jumping)			Shooting/Running (10 m Air Pistol/3000m)			Total Points	Final Rank
Athlete	Event	Results	Rank	MP points	Time	Rank	MP points	Penalties	Rank	MP points	Time	Rank	MP points	Total Points	Final Rank
Julio Luna	Men's	10	23	170	2:09.99	17	311	85	21	215	14:09.51	22	451	1147	19
Arturo Sulbaran	Men's	15	12	210	2:06.24	8	322	86	22	214	13:32.43	17	488	1236	16

== Racquetball ==
Venezuela qualified a team of two men and two women for a total of four athletes.

== Roller sports ==
Venezuela has qualified four athletes (two per gender) in the speed competitions, the maximum team size.

=== Speed ===
Athlete	Event	Semifinal		Final	
Athlete	Event	Time	Rank	Time/Points	Rank
Jhoan Guzmán	Men's 200 m time trial	—N/a		16.385	4
Jhoan Guzmán	Men's 500 m	38.948	1 Q	41.313	4
Julio Mirena	Men's 10,000 m points race	—N/a		2	9
Yarubi Bandres	Women's 200 m time trial	—N/a		18.500	6
Yarubi Bandres	Women's 500 m	42.877	4	Did not advance	
Sindy Cortes Chavez	Women's 10,000 m points race	—N/a		5	5

== Rowing ==
Venezuela qualified five boats and seven rowers (four men and three women).

Men

Athlete	Event	Heats		Repechage		Final	
Athlete	Event	Time	Rank	Time	Rank	Time	Rank
Jakson Vicent Monasterio; José Güipe Jimenez	Men's Double Sculls	7:04.12	5 R	7:11.69	4 FB	6:54.84	9
Luis Ollarves Mota; Luis Graterol Loyo	Men's Lwt Double Sculls	7:11.39	4 R	7:06.92	4 FB	6:38.18	8
Elizabeth Reyes Salazar	Women's Single Sculls	8:26.89	3 R	9:25.48	6 FB	8:18.52	8
Jenesis Perez Pastran	Women's Lwt Single Sculls	8:20.23	4 R	9:06.50	5 FB	10:24.78	8
Keyla Garcia Marcucci; Jenesis Perez Pastran	Women's Lwt Double Sculls	8:06.66	4 R	8:12.14	6 FB	7:22.37	7

Qualification Legend: FA=Final A (medal); FB=Final B (non-medal); R=Repechage

== Sailing ==
Venezuela qualified 5 boats (6 sailors).

Athlete	Event	Race														Net Points	Final Rank
Athlete	Event	1	2	3	4	5	6	7	8	9	10	11	12	13	M*	Net Points	Final Rank
Daniel Flores	Men's RS:X	3	4	(7)	6	2	4	4	4	4	6	5	4	3	10	59	4
José Gutiérrez Lupoli	Laser	9	7	10	8	11	10	12	13	12	11	(16)	12	—N/a	DNQ	115	12
Daniela Rivera	Laser Radial	10	10	1	4	2	14	(16)	8	12	2	2	1	—N/a	14	80	7
David González	Sunfish	(11)	10	10	10	9	9	6	11	10	11	9	11	—N/a	DNQ	106	11
Yamil Saba; Gonzalo Cendra	Hobie 16	3	5	(7)	6	6	4	7	6	5	5	3	4	—N/a	DNQ	54	7

== Shooting ==
Venezuela qualified 15 shooters (ten men and five women).

Men

Athlete	Event	Qualification		Final	
Athlete	Event	Points	Rank	Points	Rank
Felipe Beuvrín	10 metre air pistol	563-15x	14	Did not advance	
Marcos Núñez	10 metre air pistol	570-12x	7 Q	75.5	8
Douglas Gomez	25 metre rapid fire pistol	576-21x	5 Q	27	3rd place, bronze medalist(s)
Edilio Centeno	50 metre pistol	533-06x	10	Did not advance	
Marcos Núñez	50 metre pistol	522-05x	18	Did not advance	
Julio Iemma	10 metre air rifle	614.9	5 Q	202.2	2nd place, silver medalist(s)
Julio Iemma	50 metre rifle prone	604.9	26	Did not advance	
Raul Vargas	50 metre rifle prone	614.9	7 Q	99.6	7
Julio Iemma	50 metre rifle three positions	1151-44x	7 Q	385.3	7
Raul Vargas	50 metre rifle three positions	1127-29x	16	Did not advance	
Ricardo Cortina	Trap	110	10	Did not advance	
Leonel Martínez	Trap	109	11	Did not advance	
Ricardo Cortina	Double trap	116	11	Did not advance	
Lucio Gomez	Skeet	110	22	Did not advance	
Victor Silva	Skeet	116	16	Did not advance	

Women

Athlete	Event	Qualification		Final	
Athlete	Event	Points	Rank	Points	Rank
Ivon Bucott	10 metre air pistol	365-04x	17	Did not advance	
Maribel Pineda	10 metre air pistol	362-04x	19	Did not advance	
Editzy Pimentel	25 metre pistol	550-14x	16	Did not advance	
Maribel Pineda	25 metre pistol	552-09x	15	Did not advance	
Dairene Marquez	10 metre air rifle	406.6	11	Did not advance	
Diliana Méndez	10 metre air rifle	405.8	14	Did not advance	
Dairene Marquez	50 metre rifle three positions	565-17x	17	Did not advance	
Diliana Méndez	50 metre rifle three positions	573-20x	3 Q	425.9	4

== Softball ==
Venezuela qualified a men's team of 15 athletes.

=== Men's tournament ===
Group A

Team	Pld	W	L	RF	RA	RD	Qualification
Canada	5	5	0	33	13	+20	Qualified for the semifinals
Argentina	5	3	2	19	15	+4	Qualified for the semifinals
Venezuela	5	3	2	14	10	+4	Qualified for the semifinals
United States	5	2	3	16	10	+6	Qualified for the semifinals
Mexico	5	2	3	16	22	−6	
Dominican Republic	5	0	5	5	33	−28	

12 July 2015; 16:30	Argentina	3–0	Venezuela	President’s Choice Ajax Pan Am Ballpark, Ajax; Attendance: 200
12 July 2015; 16:30		Boxscore		President’s Choice Ajax Pan Am Ballpark, Ajax; Attendance: 200

13 July 2015; 16:30	Venezuela	5–1	Dominican Republic	President’s Choice Ajax Pan Am Ballpark, Ajax; Attendance: 129
13 July 2015; 16:30		Boxscore		President’s Choice Ajax Pan Am Ballpark, Ajax; Attendance: 129

14 July 2015; 14:00	United States	1–3	Venezuela	President’s Choice Ajax Pan Am Ballpark, Ajax; Attendance: 132
14 July 2015; 14:00		Boxscore		President’s Choice Ajax Pan Am Ballpark, Ajax; Attendance: 132

15 July 2015; 14:00	Venezuela	5–1	Mexico	President’s Choice Ajax Pan Am Ballpark, Ajax; Attendance: 215
15 July 2015; 14:00		Boxscore		President’s Choice Ajax Pan Am Ballpark, Ajax; Attendance: 215

16 July 2015; 16:30	Canada	4–1	Venezuela	President’s Choice Ajax Pan Am Ballpark, Ajax; Attendance: 2,010
16 July 2015; 16:30		Boxscore		President’s Choice Ajax Pan Am Ballpark, Ajax; Attendance: 2,010

Semifinals

17 July 2015; 16:30	Venezuela	1–0	United States	President’s Choice Ajax Pan Am Ballpark, Ajax; Attendance: 521
17 July 2015; 16:30		Boxscore		President’s Choice Ajax Pan Am Ballpark, Ajax; Attendance: 521

Final

18 July 2015; 12:00	(bronze) Argentina	0–2	Venezuela	President’s Choice Ajax Pan Am Ballpark, Ajax; Attendance: 2,999
18 July 2015; 12:00		Boxscore		President’s Choice Ajax Pan Am Ballpark, Ajax; Attendance: 2,999

Grand Final

18 July 2015; 15:00	(gold) Canada	2–1	Venezuela (silver)	President’s Choice Ajax Pan Am Ballpark, Ajax; Attendance: 3,030
18 July 2015; 15:00		Boxscore		President’s Choice Ajax Pan Am Ballpark, Ajax; Attendance: 3,030

== Synchronized swimming ==
Venezuela qualified a duet team of two athletes.

Athlete	Event	Technical Routine		Free Routine (Final)			
Athlete	Event	Points	Rank	Points	Rank	Total points	Rank
Oriana Carrillo; Greisy Gomez	Women's duet	74.4927	7	75.2333	8	149.7260	8

== Table tennis ==
Venezuela qualified one man and two women.

Athlete	Event	Group stage				Round of 32	Round of 16	Quarterfinals	Semifinals	Final / BM	
Athlete	Event	Opposition Result	Opposition Result	Opposition Result	Rank	Opposition Result	Opposition Result	Opposition Result	Opposition Result	Opposition Result	Rank
Luis Dias	Men's singles	L 0-4	W 4-3	L 1-4	3	Did not advance					
Gremlis Arvelo	Women's singles	W 4-1	L 0-4	W 4-0	2	W 4-3	L 1-4	Did not advance			9
Roxy Gonzalez	Women's singles	L 0-4	L 0-4	W 4-2	3	Did not advance					

== Taekwondo ==
Venezuela qualified seven athletes (four men and three women).

Men

Athlete	Event	Round of 16	Quarterfinals	Semifinals	Repechage	Bronze medal	Final	
Athlete	Event	Opposition Result	Opposition Result	Opposition Result	Opposition Result	Opposition Result	Opposition Result	Rank
Mario Leal	-58kg	Palacios (GUA); W 8–5	Pie (DOM); L 13–14	—N/a	Guzman (ARG); L 2–10	Did not advance		7
Edgar Contreras	-68kg	Quesada (CUB); W 10–7	Jennings (USA); L 11–12	Did not advance				
Javier Medina	-80kg	Charles (VIN); W 17–0	Cobas (CUB); L 6–18	—N/a	De Olveira (BRA); W 9–7	López (USA); L 7–3	—N/a	5
Carlos Rivas	+80kg	Bye	Molinares (COL); W 14–1	Bergeron (CAN); W 4–1	—N/a	Sio (ARG); W 10–9	Alba (CUB); L 11–4	2nd place, silver medalist(s)

Women

Athlete	Event	Round of 16	Quarterfinals	Semifinals	Repechage	Bronze medal	Final	
Athlete	Event	Opposition Result	Opposition Result	Opposition Result	Opposition Result	Opposition Result	Opposition Result	Rank
Virginia Dellan	-49kg	Aguirre (CUB); L 7–9	Did not advance					
Adriana Martinez	-57kg	Patiño (COL); L 12–13	Did not advance					
Adanys Cordero	-67kg	Louissaint (HAI); W 3–1	Vasconcelos (BRA); L 1–3	Did not advance				

== Tennis ==
Venezuela qualified four tennis players (two per gender).

Athlete	Event	1st Round	Round of 32	Round of 16	Quarterfinals	Semifinals	Bronze medal/Final	
Athlete	Event	Opposition Score	Opposition Score	Opposition Score	Opposition Score	Opposition Score	Opposition Score	Rank
Luis David Martínez	Men's singles	Schnur (CAN); L (3–6, 4–6)	Did not advance					
Ricardo Rodríguez-Pace	Men's singles	Bye	Aubone (USA); W (6–3, 4–6, 6–1)	Andreozzi (ARG); L (3–6, 1–6)	Did not advance			
Luis David Martínez; Ricardo Rodríguez-Pace	Men's doubles	Bye		King / Lewis (BAR); L (6^{2}–7^{7}, 1–6)	Did not advance			
Andrea Gámiz	Women's singles	—N/a	Campiz (PAR); W (6–3, 7–5)	Brito (CHI); W (6–4, 7–5)	Puig (PUR); L (0–6, 1–6)	Did not advance		
Mariaryeni Gutiérrez	Women's singles	—N/a	Mariño (COL); L (1–6, 2–6)	Did not advance				
Luis David Martínez; Andrea Gámiz	Mixed doubles	Bye		Austin / Vickery (USA); L (4–6, 3–6)	Did not advance			

== Water polo ==
Venezuela qualified men's and women's teams, each with 13 athletes, for a total of 26.

=== Men's tournament ===
Roster

Venezuela's team roster:

- Carlos Linares Suarez
- Joaquin Lopez
- Jean Sanchez Rangel
- Douglas Espinoza Castro
- Pedro Mujica Cardenas
- Carlos Fernandez Ramos
- Angel Rojas Borge
- Hugo Velazquez Briceño
- Antonio Pirela Ortiz
- Jonder Perdomo Duarte
- Moises Perez Ribas
- Pedro Gutierrez Benedetto
- Adrian Torres Granda

Group B

Team	Pld	W	D	L	GF	GA	GD	Pts	Qualification
Brazil	3	3	0	0	55	20	+35	6	Qualified for the semifinals
Canada	3	2	0	1	44	22	+22	4	Qualified for the semifinals
Mexico	3	0	1	2	27	50	−23	1	
Venezuela	3	0	1	2	13	47	−34	1	

7 July 2015; 16:08	Report	Venezuela	9–9	Mexico	Markham Pan Am Centre; Referees: Mark Maretzki (USA), Reynel Castillo (PUR)
7 July 2015; 16:08	Report	Score by quarters: 3–1, 1–4, 3–2, 2–2			Markham Pan Am Centre; Referees: Mark Maretzki (USA), Reynel Castillo (PUR)
7 July 2015; 16:08	Report	Borges 3	Goals	Ponce 3	Markham Pan Am Centre; Referees: Mark Maretzki (USA), Reynel Castillo (PUR)

8 July 2015; 20:08	Report	Venezuela	2–22	Brazil	Markham Pan Am Centre; Referees: Humberto Navarro (USA), Diego Garibaldi (ARG)
8 July 2015; 20:08	Report	Score by quarters: 0–6, 1–6, 0–3, 1–7			Markham Pan Am Centre; Referees: Humberto Navarro (USA), Diego Garibaldi (ARG)
8 July 2015; 20:08	Report	Cardenas, Ramos 1	Goals	Perrone 4	Markham Pan Am Centre; Referees: Humberto Navarro (USA), Diego Garibaldi (ARG)

9 July 2015; 18:08	Report	Venezuela	2–16	Canada	Markham Pan Am Centre; Referees: Jaume Teixido (SPA), Reynel Castillo (PUR)
9 July 2015; 18:08	Report	Score by quarters: 0-5, 1-3, 1-5, 0-3			Markham Pan Am Centre; Referees: Jaume Teixido (SPA), Reynel Castillo (PUR)
9 July 2015; 18:08	Report	2 players 1	Goals	Boyd, Graham 5, Bicari, Kudaba 2	Markham Pan Am Centre; Referees: Jaume Teixido (SPA), Reynel Castillo (PUR)

Fifth to Eight place

13 July 2015; 12:00	Report	Venezuela	9–8	Cuba	Markham Pan Am Centre; Referees: Reynel Castillo (PUR), Mark Maretzki (USA)
13 July 2015; 12:00	Report	Score by quarters: 1-3, 1-2, 2-1, 5-2			Markham Pan Am Centre; Referees: Reynel Castillo (PUR), Mark Maretzki (USA)
13 July 2015; 12:00	Report	Velazquez 2	Goals	Carales 4	Markham Pan Am Centre; Referees: Reynel Castillo (PUR), Mark Maretzki (USA)

Fifth place match

15 July 2015; 14:00	Report	Mexico	14–11	Venezuela	Markham Pan Am Centre; Referees: Reynel Castillo (PUR), Stéphane Roy (CAN)
15 July 2015; 14:00	Report	Score by quarters: 3-3, 4-2, 2-3, 5-3			Markham Pan Am Centre; Referees: Reynel Castillo (PUR), Stéphane Roy (CAN)
15 July 2015; 14:00	Report	Avalos 4	Goals	Perez Ribas 3	Markham Pan Am Centre; Referees: Reynel Castillo (PUR), Stéphane Roy (CAN)

=== Women's tournament ===
Roster

Venezuela's team roster:

- Lorena Godoy Nadales
- Nibley Piña Tovar
- Dulce Hernandez Cabrera
- Samantha Torres Granda
- Ana Balsero Riveros
- Marian Blanco Zambrano
- Rocio Galue Bolivar
- Franyelis Escalona Herrera
- Yineldy Araujo Marin
- Beatriz Escobar Abreu
- Orian Rolfo Coronel
- Jeisnaimil Agelvis
- Angela Calvo Marcano

Group B

Team	Pld	W	D	L	GF	GA	GD	Pts	Qualification
Canada	3	2	1	0	41	16	+25	5	Qualified for the semifinals
Brazil	3	2	1	0	42	18	+24	5	Qualified for the semifinals
Venezuela	3	0	1	2	16	44	−28	1	
Puerto Rico	3	0	1	2	26	47	−21	1	

7 July 2015; 08:08	Report	Venezuela	11–11	Puerto Rico	Markham Pan Am Centre; Referees: Humberto Navarro (USA), Guillermo Grgicevic (ARG)
7 July 2015; 08:08	Report	Score by quarters: 3–2, 5–3, 1–5, 2–1			Markham Pan Am Centre; Referees: Humberto Navarro (USA), Guillermo Grgicevic (ARG)
7 July 2015; 08:08	Report	Herrera 3	Goals	Montero 4	Markham Pan Am Centre; Referees: Humberto Navarro (USA), Guillermo Grgicevic (ARG)

8 July 2015; 12:08	Report	Venezuela	4–15	Canada	Markham Pan Am Centre; Referees: Claudia Aguilar (MEX), Mark Maretzki (USA).
8 July 2015; 12:08	Report	Score by quarters: 0–4, 1–3, 1–4, 2–4			Markham Pan Am Centre; Referees: Claudia Aguilar (MEX), Mark Maretzki (USA).
8 July 2015; 12:08	Report	4 players 1	Goals	Perreault, Robinson 3	Markham Pan Am Centre; Referees: Claudia Aguilar (MEX), Mark Maretzki (USA).

9 July 2015; 08:08	Report	Venezuela	1–18	Brazil	Markham Pan Am Centre; Referees: Thomas Molnar (HUN), Daniel Vazquez (MEX)
9 July 2015; 08:08	Report	Score by quarters: 0–4, 0–2, 1–7, 0–5			Markham Pan Am Centre; Referees: Thomas Molnar (HUN), Daniel Vazquez (MEX)
9 July 2015; 08:08	Report	Marin 1	Goals	Chiappini 7	Markham Pan Am Centre; Referees: Thomas Molnar (HUN), Daniel Vazquez (MEX)

Fifth to Eight place

12 July 2015; 14:00	Report	Mexico	10–8	Venezuela	Markham Pan Am Centre; Referees: Stéphane Roy (CAN), Edmundo Rodrigues (BRA)
12 July 2015; 14:00	Report	Score by quarters: 3-2, 3-2, 3-2, 2-1			Markham Pan Am Centre; Referees: Stéphane Roy (CAN), Edmundo Rodrigues (BRA)
12 July 2015; 14:00	Report	Castro 3	Goals	Hernandez Cabrera 3	Markham Pan Am Centre; Referees: Stéphane Roy (CAN), Edmundo Rodrigues (BRA)

Seventh place match

14 July 2015; 12:00	Report	Argentina	8–9	Venezuela	Markham Pan Am Centre; Referees: João Cardenuto (BRA), Constantino Castro (CUB)
14 July 2015; 12:00	Report	Score by quarters: 0-1, 1-2, 2-1, 2-1			Markham Pan Am Centre; Referees: João Cardenuto (BRA), Constantino Castro (CUB)
14 July 2015; 12:00	Report	R De Virgilio 2	Goals	Coronel 2	Markham Pan Am Centre; Referees: João Cardenuto (BRA), Constantino Castro (CUB)

== Water skiing ==
Venezuela qualified one athlete in the wakeboarding competition.

Athlete	Event	Preliminary	Rank	Final	Rank
Juan Mendez	Men's wakeboard	48.45	4 Q	72.22	3rd place, bronze medalist(s)

== Weightlifting ==
Venezuela qualified 13 athletes (7 men and 6 women).

Men

Athlete	Event	Snatch		Clean & jerk		Total	Rank
Athlete	Event	Result	Rank	Result	Rank	Total	Rank
Jesús López	−62 kg	125	3	158	3	283	3rd place, bronze medalist(s)
Israel José Rubio	−69 kg	135	3	160	7	295	5
Edwar Vasquez	−69 kg	130	6	165	5	295	6
Junior Sánchez	−77 kg	155	1	182	2	337	2nd place, silver medalist(s)
Renson Balza	−85 kg	157	3	185	5	342	5
Herbys Márquez	−94 kg	155	6	195	4	350	4
Jesús González	−105 kg	175	=2	210	1	385	1st place, gold medalist(s)

Women

Athlete	Event	Snatch		Clean & jerk		Total	Rank
Athlete	Event	Result	Rank	Result	Rank	Total	Rank
Betsi Rivas	−48 kg	70	7	92	5	162	5
Génesis Rodríguez	−53 kg	92	1	109	2	201	2nd place, silver medalist(s)
Yusleidy Figueroa	−58 kg	93	2	116	3	209	2nd place, silver medalist(s)
Dayana Chirinos Leon	−69 kg	95	5	115	5	210	5
Yaniuska Espinosa	+75 kg	115	3	148	1	263	1st place, gold medalist(s)
Naryury Perez	+75 kg	112	5	146	2	258	2nd place, silver medalist(s)

== Wrestling ==
Venezuela qualified 17 wrestlers (11 men and six women).

Men
Freestyle

Athlete	Event	Preliminaries	Quarterfinals	Semifinals	Final / BM	Rank
Athlete	Event	Opposition Result	Opposition Result	Opposition Result	Opposition Result	Rank
Pedro Mejías	57 kg	—N/a	Mayea (ECU); W 4–0	Bonne (CUB); L 2–12	Bonilla (HON); W 7–0	3rd place, bronze medalist(s)
Wilfredo Henriquez	65 kg	Bye	Gómez (PUR); L 0–10	Did not advance		
Christian Sarco	74 kg	Bye	Gajardo (USA); W 10–0	Blanco (ECU); L 2–2	Scott (CRC); W 10^{F}–0	3rd place, bronze medalist(s)
Pedro Ceballos	86 kg	—N/a	Espinal (PUR); L 5–8	Did not advance		
José Daniel Díaz	97 kg	—N/a	Cortina (CUB); W 7–4	Snyder (USA); L 0–10	Maier (ARG); W 9–0	3rd place, bronze medalist(s)
Luis Vivenes	125 kg	—N/a	Ramos (CUB); L 4–6	Did not advance		

Greco-Roman

Athlete	Event	Quarterfinals	Semifinals	Final / BM	Rank
Athlete	Event	Opposition Result	Opposition Result	Opposition Result	Rank
Wuileixis Rivas	66 kg	Cuero (COL); W 8–0	Martinez (CUB); W 2–1	Saddoris (USA); W 13–1	1st place, gold medalist(s)
Luis Avendaño	75 kg	Bisek (USA); L 0–8	Bye	Escobar (MEX); L 0–2^{F}	5
Querys Perez	85 kg	Leyva (MEX); W 6–4	Mosquera (COL); W 6–5	Anderson (USA); L 0–9	2nd place, silver medalist(s)
Luillys Perez	98 kg	Williams (USA); W 11–4	Mejia (HON); L 2–8	Rocha (MEX); W 4–0	3rd place, bronze medalist(s)
Moisés Pérez	130 kg	Mijaín López (VEN); L 0–9	Bye	Smith (USA); L WO	5

Women
Freestyle

Athlete	Event	Quarterfinals	Semifinals	Final / BM	Rank
Athlete	Event	Opposition Result	Opposition Result	Opposition Result	Rank
Sehilyn Oliveros	48 kg	Castillo (COL); L 0–10	Did not advance		
Betzabeth Argüello	53 kg	Valencia (MEX); L 1–12	Bye	Valverde (ECU); W 8^{F}–0	3rd place, bronze medalist(s)
Betzabeth Sarco	58 kg	Sovero (PER); L 2–3	Did not advance		
Nathaly Grimán	63 kg	Rentería (COL); L 6–11^{F}	Did not advance		
María Acosta	69 kg	Rivera (PUR); W 5–0	Miranda (MEX); W 3–1	Yeats (CAN); L 2–13	2nd place, silver medalist(s)
Jaramit Weffer	75 kg	Di Stasio (CAN); L 3–5	Bye	Hechavarria (CUB); L 1–2	5

== See also ==
- Venezuela at the 2016 Summer Olympics
