= Cycling at the 2015 Pan American Games – Men's keirin =

Cycling – Men's keirin at the 2015 Pan American Games
- Venue: Milton Velodrome
- Dates: July 19
- Competitors: 8 from 8 nations

Medalists
Gold medal	Fabián Puerta	Colombia
Silver medal	Hersony Canelón	Venezuela
Bronze medal	Hugo Barrette	Canada

The men's keirin competition of the cycling events at the 2015 Pan American Games was held on July 19 at the Milton Velodrome in Milton, Ontario.

== Schedule ==
All times are Eastern Daylight Time (UTC-4).

Date	Time	Round
July 19, 2015	11:28	First Round
July 19, 2015	18:58	Finals

== Results ==
=== First round ===
==== Heat 1 ====
Rank	Name	Nation	Notes
1	Fabián Puerta	Colombia	Q
2	Hersony Canelón	Venezuela	Q
3	Jair Tjon En Fa	Suriname	Q
4	Flavio Cipriano	Brazil	REL

==== Heat 2 ====
Rank	Name	Nation	Notes
1	Hugo Barrette	Canada	Q
2	Njisane Phillip	Trinidad and Tobago	Q
3	Leandro Bottasso	Argentina	Q
4	Matthew Baranoski	United States	

=== Finals ===
==== Finals 7–12 ====
Rank	Name	Nation	Notes
7	Flavio Cipriano	Brazil	
8	Matthew Baranoski	United States	

==== Finals 1–6 ====
Rank	Name	Nation	Notes
1st place, gold medalist(s)	Fabián Puerta	Colombia	
2nd place, silver medalist(s)	Hersony Canelón	Venezuela	
3rd place, bronze medalist(s)	Hugo Barrette	Canada	
4	Leandro Bottasso	Argentina	
5	Njisane Phillip	Trinidad and Tobago	
6	Jair Tjon En Fa	Suriname	
