= 2019 UCI Track Cycling World Championships – Men's keirin =

Men's keirin at the 2019 UCI Track Cycling World Championships
- Venue: BGŻ Arena
- Location: Pruszków, Poland
- Dates: 28 February
- Competitors: 28 from 19 nations

Medalists
gold medal	Matthijs Büchli	Netherlands
silver medal	Yudai Nitta	Japan
bronze medal	Stefan Bötticher	Germany

The Men's keirin competition at the 2019 UCI Track Cycling World Championships was held on 28 February 2019.

== Results ==
=== First round ===
The first round was started at 14:30. The first two riders from each heat qualified for the next round, all other riders moved to the repechages.

Heat 1

Rank	Name	Nation	Gap	Notes
1	Stefan Bötticher	Germany		Q
2	Pavel Kelemen	Czech Republic	+0.061	Q
3	Kacio Fonseca	Brazil	+0.265	
4	Pavel Vorzhev	Kazakhstan	+0.660	
5	Tomoyuki Kawabata	Japan	+0.883	

Heat 3

Rank	Name	Nation	Gap	Notes
1	Matthew Glaetzer	Australia		Q
2	Yudai Nitta	Japan	+0.041	Q
3	Kevin Quintero	Colombia	+0.088	
4	Hersony Canelón	Venezuela	+0.197	
5	Joel Archambault	Canada	+0.352	
6	Theo Bos	Netherlands	+0.608	

Heat 5

Rank	Name	Nation	Gap	Notes
1	Marc Jurczyk	Germany		Q
2	Jack Carlin	Great Britain	+0.040	Q
3	Krzysztof Maksel	Poland	+0.123	
4	Matthijs Büchli	Netherlands	+0.183	
5	Kwesi Browne	Trinidad and Tobago	+0.228	
6	Patrick Constable	Australia	+0.874	

Heat 2

Rank	Name	Nation	Gap	Notes
1	Yuta Wakimoto	Japan		Q
2	Eddie Dawkins	New Zealand	+0.009	Q
3	Juan Peralta	Spain	+0.120	
4	Joachim Eilers	Germany	+0.208	
5	Muhammad Shah Firdaus Sahrom	Malaysia	+0.442	

Heat 4

Rank	Name	Nation	Gap	Notes
1	Sébastien Vigier	France		Q
2	Tomáš Bábek	Czech Republic	+0.001	Q
3	Azizulhasni Awang	Malaysia	+0.067	
4	Hugo Barrette	Canada	+0.067	
5	Santiago Ramírez	Colombia	+0.164	
6	Jean Spies	South Africa	+0.246	

=== First round repechage ===
The first round repechage was started at 15:40. The first two riders of each heat qualified for the quarterfinals.

Heat 1

Rank	Name	Nation	Gap	Notes
1	Matthijs Büchli	Netherlands		Q
2	Theo Bos	Netherlands	+0.149	Q
3	Hugo Barrette	Canada	+0.246	
4	Kacio Fonseca	Brazil	+0.395	

Heat 3

Rank	Name	Nation	Gap	Notes
1	Tomoyuki Kawabata	Japan		Q
2	Patrick Constable	Australia	+0.069	Q
3	Santiago Ramírez	Colombia	+0.225	
4	Joachim Eilers	Germany	+0.251	
—	Kevin Quintero	Colombia	Relegated	

Heat 2

Rank	Name	Nation	Gap	Notes
1	Hersony Canelón	Venezuela		Q
2	Jean Spies	South Africa	+0.053	Q
2	Kwesi Browne	Trinidad and Tobago	+0.053	Q
4	Juan Peralta	Spain	+0.064	
5	Pavel Vorzhev	Kazakhstan	+0.075	

Heat 4

Rank	Name	Nation	Gap	Notes
1	Krzysztof Maksel	Poland		Q
2	Azizulhasni Awang	Malaysia	+0.013	Q
3	Muhammad Shah Firdaus Sahrom	Malaysia	+0.083	
4	Joel Archambault	Canada	+0.283	

=== Quarterfinals ===
The quarterfinals were started at 16:36. The first four riders from each qualified for the semifinals.

Heat 1

Rank	Name	Nation	Gap	Notes
1	Stefan Bötticher	Germany		Q
2	Sébastien Vigier	France	+0.229	Q
3	Azizulhasni Awang	Malaysia	+0.329	Q
4	Eddie Dawkins	New Zealand	+0.398	Q
5	Hersony Canelón	Venezuela	+1.603	
—	Tomoyuki Kawabata	Japan	Relegated	

Heat 3

Rank	Name	Nation	Gap	Notes
1	Matthew Glaetzer	Australia		Q
2	Jack Carlin	Great Britain	+0.006	Q
3	Theo Bos	Netherlands	+0.079	Q
4	Kwesi Browne	Trinidad and Tobago	+0.095	Q
5	Pavel Kelemen	Czech Republic	+0.146	
6	Tomáš Bábek	Czech Republic	+0.157	
7	Jean Spies	South Africa	+0.337	

Heat 2

Rank	Name	Nation	Gap	Notes
1	Matthijs Büchli	Netherlands		Q
2	Yudai Nitta	Japan	+0.052	Q
3	Krzysztof Maksel	Poland	+0.136	Q
4	Yuta Wakimoto	Japan	+0.189	Q
5	Marc Jurczyk	Germany	+0.241	
6	Patrick Constable	Australia	+0.247	

=== Semifinals ===
The semifinals were started at 19:14. The first three riders from each qualified for the final.

Heat 1

Rank	Name	Nation	Gap	Notes
1	Stefan Bötticher	Germany		Q
2	Sébastien Vigier	France	+0.072	Q
3	Yudai Nitta	Japan	+0.084	Q
4	Krzysztof Maksel	Poland	+0.165	
5	Kwesi Browne	Trinidad and Tobago	+0.453	
6	Theo Bos	Netherlands	+0.961	

Heat 2

Rank	Name	Nation	Gap	Notes
1	Matthijs Büchli	Netherlands		Q
2	Matthew Glaetzer	Australia	+0.003	Q
3	Jack Carlin	Great Britain	+0.015	Q
4	Azizulhasni Awang	Malaysia	+0.053	
5	Yuta Wakimoto	Japan	+0.103	
6	Eddie Dawkins	New Zealand	+0.143	

=== Finals ===
The finals were started at 20:38.

==== Small final ====
Rank	Name	Nation	Gap	Notes
7	Azizulhasni Awang	Malaysia		
8	Yuta Wakimoto	Japan	+0.069	
9	Eddie Dawkins	New Zealand	+0.199	
10	Krzysztof Maksel	Poland	+0.258	
11	Theo Bos	Netherlands	+0.697	
12	Kwesi Browne	Trinidad and Tobago	+1.589	

==== Final ====
Rank	Name	Nation	Gap	Notes
1st place, gold medalist(s)	Matthijs Büchli	Netherlands		
2nd place, silver medalist(s)	Yudai Nitta	Japan	+0.038	
3rd place, bronze medalist(s)	Stefan Bötticher	Germany	+0.197	
4	Matthew Glaetzer	Australia	+0.244	
5	Jack Carlin	Great Britain	+0.332	
6	Sébastien Vigier	France	+0.344	
