= Cycling at the 2015 Pan American Games – Men's sprint =

Cycling – Men's sprint at the 2015 Pan American Games
- Venue: Milton Velodrome
- Dates: July 17–18
- Competitors: 14 from 8 nations

Medalists
Gold medal	Hugo Barrette	Canada
Silver medal	Njisane Phillip	Trinidad and Tobago
Bronze medal	Hersony Canelón	Venezuela

The men's sprint competition of the cycling events at the 2015 Pan American Games was held on July 17 and 18 at the Milton Velodrome in Milton, Ontario.

== Schedule ==
All times are Eastern Standard Time (UTC-3).

Date	Time	Round
July 17, 2015	11:05	Qualification
July 17, 2015	11:42	Eighth finals
July 17, 2015	12:12	Repechage
July 17, 2015	18:05	Quarterfinals
July 17, 2015	19:19	Race For 5th-8th Places
July 18, 2015	12:11	Semifinals
July 18, 2015	18:45	Finals

== Results ==
=== Qualification ===
Fastest 12 riders continue to the eighth finals.

Rank	Name	Nation	Time	Notes
1	Hugo Barrette	Canada	9.978	Q
2	Fabián Puerta	Colombia	10.015	Q
3	Hersony Canelón	Venezuela	10.041	Q
4	Njisane Phillip	Trinidad and Tobago	10.121	Q
5	Joseph Veloce	Canada	10.158	Q
6	Matthew Baranoski	United States	10.161	Q
7	Jair Tjon En Fa	Suriname	10.193	Q
8	Santiago Ramírez	Colombia	10.209	Q
9	David Espinoza	United States	10.318	Q
10	Fonseca Da Silva Freitas	Brazil	10.346	Q
11	Leandro Bottasso	Argentina	10.373	Q
12	Flavio Cipriano	Brazil	10.398	Q
13	Justin Roberts	Trinidad and Tobago	10.463	
14	Ángel Pulgar	Venezuela	10.605	

=== Eighth finals ===
The winners of each advance to the quarterfinals, while the losers advance to the repechage

Heat	Rank	Name	Nation	Time	Notes
1	1	Flavio Cipriano	Brazil		Q
1	2	Hugo Barrette	Canada	REL	R
2	1	Fabián Puerta	Colombia	10.795	Q
2	2	Leandro Bottasso	Argentina		R
3	1	Hersony Canelón	Venezuela	10.895	Q
3	2	Fonseca Da Silva Freitas	Brazil		R
4	1	Njisane Phillip	Trinidad and Tobago	10.585	Q
4	2	David Espinoza	United States		R
5	1	Joseph Veloce	Canada	10.540	Q
5	2	Santiago Ramírez	Colombia		R
6	1	Matthew Baranoski	United States	10.296	Q
6	2	Jair Tjon En Fa	Suriname		R

=== Repechage ===
The winner of each advanced to the quarterfinals.

Heat	Rank	Name	Nation	Time	Notes
1	1	Hugo Barrette	Canada	10.747	Q
1	2	David Espinoza	United States		
1	3	Jair Tjon En Fa	Suriname		
2	1	Fonseca Da Silva Freitas	Brazil	10.675	Q
2	2	Santiago Ramírez	Colombia		
2	3	Leandro Bottasso	Argentina		

=== Quarterfinals ===
Heat	Rank	Name	Nation	Race 1	Race 2	Decide	Notes
1	1	Flavio Cipriano	Brazil	11.151	11.798		Q
1	2	Fonseca Da Silva Freitas	Brazil				
2	1	Hugo Barrette	Canada	10.402		10.314	Q
2	2	Fabián Puerta	Colombia		10.513		
3	1	Hersony Canelón	Venezuela	10.457	10.429		Q
3	2	Matthew Baranoski	United States				
4	1	Njisane Phillip	Trinidad and Tobago	10.606	10.523		Q
4	2	Joseph Veloce	Canada				

=== Race for 5th–8th Places ===
Rank	Name	Nation	Time	Notes
5	Matthew Baranoski	United States	10.442	
6	Joseph Veloce	Canada		
7	Fonseca Da Silva Freitas	Brazil		
8	Fabián Puerta	Colombia		

=== Semifinals ===
Heat	Rank	Name	Nation	Race 1	Race 2	Decide	Notes
1	1	Njisane Phillip	Trinidad and Tobago	10.711	10.761		Q
1	2	Flavio Cipriano	Brazil				
2	1	Hugo Barrette	Canada	10.472	10.902		Q
2	2	Hersony Canelón	Venezuela				

=== Finals ===
Heat	Rank	Name	Nation	Race 1	Race 2	Decide	Notes
For Gold	1st place, gold medalist(s)	Hugo Barrette	Canada	10.409	10.709		
For Gold	2nd place, silver medalist(s)	Njisane Phillip	Trinidad and Tobago				
For Bronze	3rd place, bronze medalist(s)	Hersony Canelón	Venezuela	10.922	10.541		
For Bronze	4	Flavio Cipriano	Brazil				
