= Cycling at the 2019 Pan American Games – Men's keirin =

Men's keirin at the 2019 Pan American Games
- Venue: Velodrome
- Dates: August 4
- Competitors: 10 from 10 nations

Medalists
Gold medal	Kevin Quintero	Colombia
Silver medal	Hersony Canelón	Venezuela
Bronze medal	Leandro Bottasso	Argentina

The men's keirin competition of the cycling events at the 2019 Pan American Games was held on August 4 at the Velodrome.

== Schedule ==
Date	Time	Round
August 4, 2019	11:14	First round
August 4, 2019	12:40	First round repechage
August 4, 2019	18:41	Finals

== Results ==
=== First round ===
First 2 riders in each heat qualify to Final 1-6 and the others to First Round Repechage.

==== Heat 1 ====
Rank	Name	Nation	Notes
1	Kevin Quintero	Colombia	Q
2	Jaïr Tjon En Fa	Suriname	Q
3	Kacio Fonseca	Brazil	
4	Edgar Verdugo	Mexico	
5	Brandon Pineda	Guatemala	

==== Heat 2 ====
Rank	Name	Nation	Notes
1	Kwesi Browne	Trinidad and Tobago	Q
2	Hersony Canelón	Venezuela	Q
3	Robinson Ruiz	Peru	
	Leandro Bottasso	Argentina	REL
	Joel Archambault	Canada	DNF

=== First round repechage ===
First 2 riders qualify to Final 1-6

Rank	Name	Nation	Notes
1	Brandon Pineda	Guatemala	Q
2	Leandro Bottasso	Argentina	Q
3	Kacio Fonseca	Brazil	
4	Edgar Verdugo	Mexico	
5	Joel Archambault	Canada	
6	Robinson Ruiz	Peru	

=== Finals ===
The final classification is determined in the medal finals.

==== Finals 7–12 ====
Rank	Name	Nation	Notes
7	Joel Archambault	Canada	
8	Kacio Fonseca	Brazil	
9	Edgar Verdugo	Mexico	
10	Robinson Ruiz	Peru	

==== Finals 1–6 ====
Rank	Name	Nation	Notes
1st place, gold medalist(s)	Kevin Quintero	Colombia	
2nd place, silver medalist(s)	Hersony Canelón	Venezuela	
3rd place, bronze medalist(s)	Leandro Bottasso	Argentina	
4	Brandon Pineda	Guatemala	
5	Jaïr Tjon En Fa	Suriname	
	Kwesi Browne	Trinidad and Tobago	REL
