= Cycling at the 2011 Pan American Games – Men's sprint =

Cycling – Men's sprint at the 2011 Pan American Games
- Venue: Pan American Velodrome
- Dates: October 18–19
- Competitors: 14 from 9 nations

Medalists
Gold medal	Hersony Canelón	Venezuela
Silver medal	Fabián Puerta	Colombia
Bronze medal	Njisane Phillip	Trinidad and Tobago

The women's sprint competition of the cycling events at the 2011 Pan American Games was held between October 18 and 19 at the Pan American Velodrome in Guadalajara. The defending champion is Julio César Herrera of Cuba.

== Schedule ==
All times are Central Standard Time (UTC-6).

Date	Time	Round
October 18, 2011	11:30	Qualifying
October 18, 2011	17:00	Eighth finals
October 18, 2011	17:35	Repechage
October 18, 2011	18:45	Quarterfinals
October 19, 2011	16:00	Semifinals
October 19, 2011	16:45	Final

== Results ==
=== Qualification ===
Fastest 12 riders continue to the eighth finals.

Rank	Name	Nation	Time	Notes
1	Njisane Phillip	Trinidad and Tobago	9.977	Q, PR
2	Michael Blatchford	United States	9.983	Q
3	Fabián Puerta	Colombia	9.985	Q
4	Hersony Canelón	Venezuela	10.006	Q
5	James Watkins	United States	10.058	Q
6	Jonathan Marín	Colombia	10.092	Q
7	Leandro Bottasso	Argentina	10.122	Q
8	Flavio Cipriano	Brazil	10.188	Q
9	Ángel Pulgar	Venezuela	10.230	Q
10	Jonathan Gatto	Argentina	10.313	Q
11	Ruben Horta	Mexico	10.359	Q
12	Alejandro Mainat	Cuba	10.426	Q
13	Cristopher Mansilla	Chile	10.601	
14	Carlos Carrasco	Mexico	10.719	

=== Eighth finals ===
The winners of each advance to the quarterfinals, while the losers advance to the repechage.

Heat	Rank	Name	Nation	Time	Notes
1	1	Njisane Phillip	Trinidad and Tobago	10.690	Q
1	2	Alejandro Mainat	Cuba		
2	1	Ruben Horta	Mexico	11.407	Q
2	2	Michael Blatchford	United States		
3	1	Fabián Puerta	Colombia	10.473	Q
3	2	Jonathan Gatto	Argentina		
4	1	Hersony Canelón	Venezuela	11.022	Q
4	2	Ángel Pulgar	Venezuela		
5	1	James Watkins	United States	10.549	Q
5	2	Flavio Cipriano	Brazil		
6	1	Jonathan Marín	Colombia	10.549	Q
6	2	Leandro Bottasso	Argentina		

=== Repechage ===
The winner of each advanced to the quarterfinals.

Heat	Rank	Name	Nation	Time	Notes
1	1	Ángel Pulgar	Venezuela	10.392	Q
1	2	Alejandro Mainat	Cuba		
1	3	Leandro Bottasso	Argentina		
2	1	Michael Blatchford	United States	10.449	Q
2	2	Jonathan Gatto	Argentina		
2	3	Flavio Cipriano	Brazil		

=== Quarterfinals ===
Heat	Rank	Name	Nation	Time	Notes
1	1	Njisane Phillip	Trinidad and Tobago	10.252	Q
1	2	Michael Blatchford	United States		
2	1	Ángel Pulgar	Venezuela	10.520	Q
2	2	Ruben Horta	Mexico		
3	1	Fabián Puerta	Colombia	10.367	Q
3	2	Jonathan Marín	Colombia		
4	1	Hersony Canelón	Venezuela	10.500	Q
4	2	James Watkins	United States		

=== Semifinals ===
Heat	Rank	Name	Nation	Time	Notes
1	1	Hersony Canelón	Venezuela	10.210	Q
1	2	Njisane Phillip	Trinidad and Tobago		
2	1	Fabián Puerta	Colombia	10.739	Q
2	2	Ángel Pulgar	Venezuela		

=== Fifth to eighth place ===
Heat	Name	Nation	Time	Notes
5	James Watkins	United States	10.637	
6	Ruben Horta	Mexico		
7	Michael Blatchford	United States		
8	Jonathan Marín	Colombia		DNS

=== Finals ===
Rank	Name	Nation	Race 1	Race 2	Decider
Gold Medal Races
1st place, gold medalist(s)	Hersony Canelón	Venezuela	10.435	10.653	
2nd place, silver medalist(s)	Fabián Puerta	Colombia			
Bronze Medal Races
3rd place, bronze medalist(s)	Njisane Phillip	Trinidad and Tobago	10.935	10.507	
4	Ángel Pulgar	Venezuela			
