= Cycling at the 2016 Summer Olympics – Men's keirin =

Men's Keirin at the Games of the XXXI Olympiad
- Venue: Rio Olympic Velodrome
- Date: 16 August
- Competitors: 27 from 18 nations

Medalists
1st place, gold medalist(s)		Jason Kenny	Great Britain
2nd place, silver medalist(s)		Matthijs Büchli	Netherlands
3rd place, bronze medalist(s)		Azizulhasni Awang	Malaysia

The men's Keirin at the 2016 Olympic Games in Rio de Janeiro took place at the Rio Olympic Velodrome on 16 August.

The medals were presented by Prince Tunku Imran, IOC member, Malaysia and Dr Wagih Azzam, Vice President of the UCI.

== Competition format ==
The Keirin races involved 5.5 laps of the track behind a motorcycle, followed by a 2.5 lap sprint to the finish. The tournament consisted of preliminary heats and repechages, a semi-finals round, and the finals. The heats and repechages narrowed the field to 12. The semi-finals divided the remaining 12 into six finalists. The finals round also included a ranking race for 7th to 12th place.

== Schedule ==
All times are Brasília Time

Date	Time	Round
Tuesday 16 August 2016	10:18 & 18:14	Round 1, repechage, round 2 and final

== Results ==
=== First round ===
Top two in each heat qualified directly for the second round; the remainder advanced to the first round repechages.

==== Heat 1 ====
Rank	Rider	Time	Note
1	Michaël D'Almeida (FRA)		Q
2	Joachim Eilers (GER)	+0.123	Q
3	Theo Bos (NED)	+0.387	
4	Christos Volikakis (GRE)	+0.467	
5	Patrick Constable (AUS)	+0.637	
6	Im Chae-bin (KOR)	+0.859	

==== Heat 3 ====
Rank	Rider	Time	Note
1	Sam Webster (NZL)		Q
2	Matthijs Büchli (NED)	+0.034	Q
3	François Pervis (FRA)	+0.035	
4	Krzysztof Maksel (POL)	+0.378	
5	Azizulhasni Awang (MAS)	+0.484	
6	Callum Skinner (GBR)	+1.069	
7	Angel Pulgar (VEN)	REL^{[R2]}	

==== Heat 2 ====
Rank	Rider	Time	Note
1	Damian Zieliński (POL)		Q
2	Matthew Glaetzer (AUS)	+0.033	Q
3	Kang Dong-jin (KOR)	+0.063	
4	Eddie Dawkins (NZL)	+0.076	
5	Kazunari Watanabe (JPN)	+0.155	
6	Pavel Kelemen (CZE)	+0.214	
7	Denis Dmitriev (RUS)	REL^{[R1]}	

==== Heat 4 ====
Rank	Rider	Time	Note
1	Jason Kenny (GBR)		Q
2	Fabián Puerta (COL)	+0.014	Q
3	Maximilian Levy (GER)	+0.103	
4	Hugo Barrette (CAN)	+0.110	
5	Matthew Baranoski (USA)	+0.237	
6	Yuta Wakimoto (JPN)	+0.345	
7	Hersony Canelón (VEN)	+0.986	

- ^{^{R1}} Relegation for moving down towards the inside of the track and forcing other competitor off the track
- ^{^{R2}} Relegation and Warning for moving down towards the inside of the track when a rival was already there

=== First round Repechages ===
The winner of each heat qualified for the second round.

==== Heat 1 ====
Rank	Rider	Time	Note
1	Azizulhasni Awang (MAS)		Q
2	Hugo Barrette (CAN)	+0.038	
3	Theo Bos (NED)	+0.079	
4	Pavel Kelemen (CZE)	+0.180	

==== Heat 3 ====
Rank	Rider	Time	Note
1	François Pervis (FRA)		Q
2	Yuta Wakimoto (JPN)	+0.075	
3	Eddie Dawkins (NZL)	+0.114	
4	Angel Pulgar (VEN)	+0.378	
5	Patrick Constable (AUS)	+1.090	

==== Heat 2 ====
Rank	Rider	Time	Note
1	Krzysztof Maksel (POL)		Q
2	Im Chae-bin (KOR)	+0.047	
3	Kang Dong-jin (KOR)	+0.123	
4	Kazunari Watanabe (JPN)	+0.485	
5	Hersony Canelón (VEN)	+1.237	

==== Heat 4 ====
Rank	Rider	Time	Note
1	Christos Volikakis (GRE)		Q
2	Denis Dmitriev (RUS)	+0.066	
3	Matthew Baranoski (USA)	+0.640	
4	Maximilian Levy (GER)	+1.277	
5	Callum Skinner (GBR)	REL^{[R3]}	

- ^{^{R3}} Relegation for entering the sprinter's lane when the opponent was already there

=== Second round ===
First three riders in each semi qualified for the final; the remainder advanced to the small final (for places 7–12).

==== Heat 1 ====
Rank	Rider	Time	Note
1	Jason Kenny (GBR)		Q
2	Matthijs Büchli (NED)	+0.261	Q
3	Azizulhasni Awang (MAS)	+0.271	Q
4	Matthew Glaetzer (AUS)	+0.325	
5	Christos Volikakis (GRE)	+0.482	
6	Michaël D'Almeida (FRA)	+1.088	

==== Heat 2 ====
Rank	Rider	Time	Note
1	Joachim Eilers (GER)		Q
2	Damian Zieliński (POL)	+0.071	Q
3	Fabián Puerta (COL)	+0.073	Q
4	Krzysztof Maksel (POL)	+0.130	
5	François Pervis (FRA)	+0.137	
6	Sam Webster (NZL)	+1.524	

=== Finals ===
The final classification is determined in the ranking finals.

==== Final (places 7–12) ====
Rank	Rider	Time	Note
7	Sam Webster (NZL)		
8	Michaël D'Almeida (FRA)	+0.009	
9	Krzysztof Maksel (POL)	+0.107	
10	Matthew Glaetzer (AUS)	+0.322	
11	François Pervis (FRA)	+0.406	
12	Christos Volikakis (GRE)	+0.514	

==== Final (places 1–6) ====
Rank	Rider	Time	Note
1st place, gold medalist(s)	Jason Kenny (GBR)		
2nd place, silver medalist(s)	Matthijs Büchli (NED)	+0.040	
3rd place, bronze medalist(s)	Azizulhasni Awang (MAS)	+0.085	
4	Joachim Eilers (GER)	+0.110	
5	Fabián Puerta (COL)	+0.113	
6	Damian Zieliński (POL)	+0.594	
