= Cycling at the 2011 Pan American Games – Men's Keirin =

Cycling – Men's Keirin at the 2011 Pan American Games
- Venue: Pan American Velodrome
- Dates: October 20
- Competitors: 8 from 8 nations

Medalists
Gold medal	Fabián Puerta	Colombia
Silver medal	Hersony Canelón	Venezuela
Bronze medal	Leandro Bottasso	Argentina

The men's Keirin competition of the cycling events at the 2011 Pan American Games was held on October 20 at the Pan American Velodrome in Guadalajara. The defending champion is Leonardo Narváez of Colombia.

== Schedule ==
All times are Central Standard Time (UTC-6).

Date	Time	Round
October 20, 2011	10:00	First round
October 20, 2011	10:20	First Round Repechage
October 20, 2011	16:35	Final

== Results ==
=== First round ===
First 2 riders in each heat qualify to final, while the rest will race in the repechage.

Rank	Heat	Name	Nation	Notes
1	1	James Watkins	United States	Q
2	1	Fabián Puerta	Colombia	Q
3	1	Alejandro Mainat	Cuba	
4	1	Ruben Horta	Mexico	
1	2	Hersony Canelon	Venezuela	Q
2	2	Leandro Bottasso	Argentina	Q
3	2	Flavio Cipriano	Brazil	
4	2	Cristopher Mansilla	Chile	

=== First round repechage ===
The top two cyclists advanced to the final.

Rank	Name	Nation	Notes
1	Cristopher Mansilla	Chile	
2	Flavio Cipriano	Brazil	
3	Ruben Horta	Mexico	
4	Alejandro Mainat	Cuba	

=== Final ===
Rank	Name	Nation	Notes
1st place, gold medalist(s)	Fabián Puerta	Colombia	
2nd place, silver medalist(s)	Hersony Canelon	Venezuela	
3rd place, bronze medalist(s)	Leandro Bottasso	Argentina	
4	James Watkins	United States	
5	Cristopher Mansilla	Chile	
6	Flavio Cipriano	Brazil	
