= Jaïr Tjon En Fa =

Surinamese cyclist

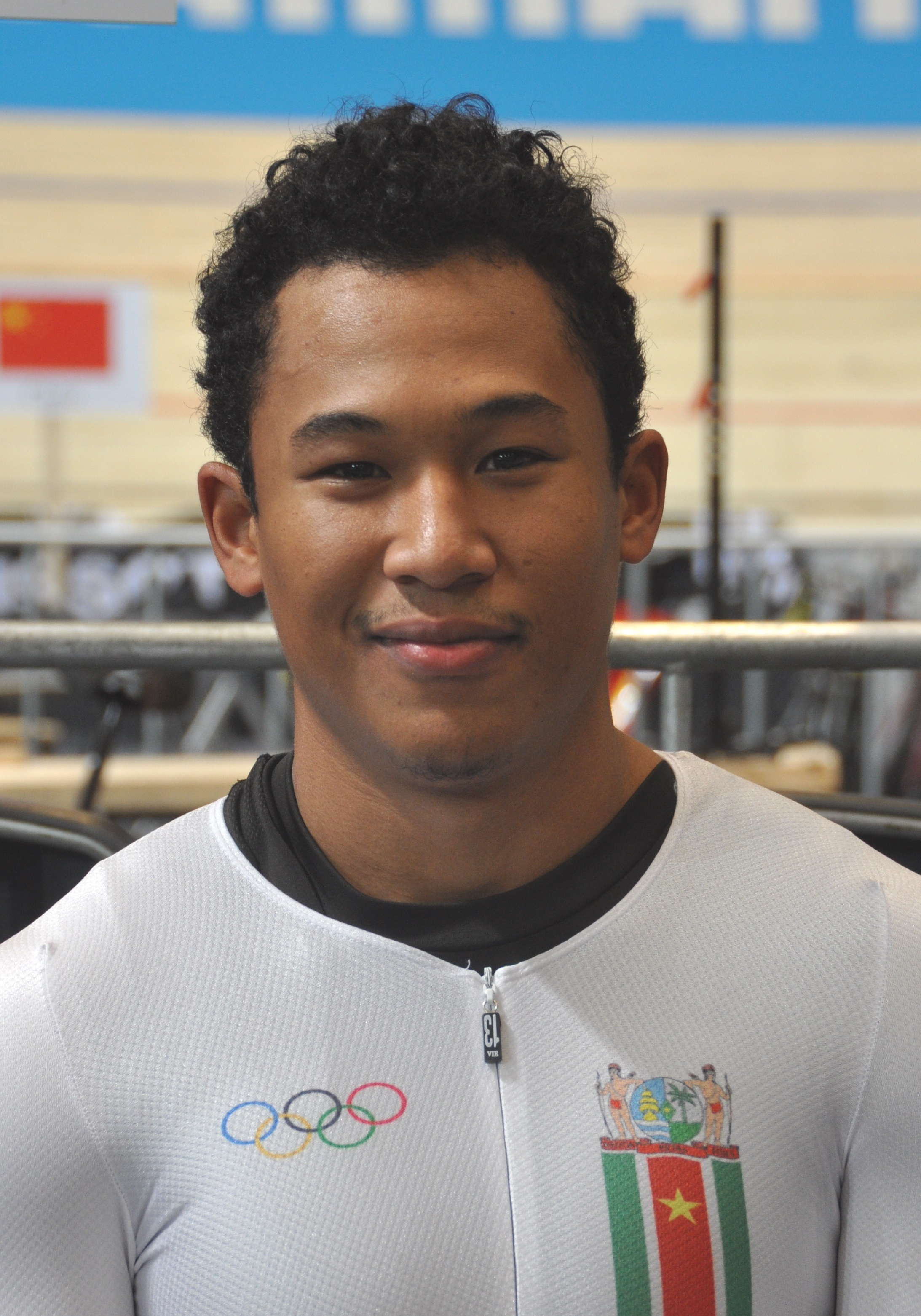
- Tjon En Fa in 2016

Personal information
- Born: 19 October 1993 (age 32) Paramaribo, Suriname
- Height: 1.66 m (5 ft 5 in)
- Weight: 75 kg (165 lb)

Cycling career
- Sport: Cycling
- Discipline: Track cycling
- Role: Rider
- Rider type: sprint
Medal record
Representing Suriname
Men's track cycling
Pan American Games
Silver medal – second place	Santiago 2023	Sprint
Pan American Championships
Silver medal – second place	2023 San Juan	Keirin
Silver medal – second place	2022 Lima	Sprint
Silver medal – second place	2019 Cochabamba	Sprint
Silver medal – second place	2016 Aguascalientes	Sprint
Bronze medal – third place	2023 San Juan	Sprint
Bronze medal – third place	2017 Couva	Sprint
Central American and Caribbean Games
Bronze medal – third place	2014 Veracruz	Sprint

Jaïr Tjon En Fa (born 19 October 1993) is a Surinamese male track cyclist and two time (2020 Tokyo & 2024 Paris) Olympian. He began cycling at the age of 13 in 2007 in his home country of Suriname. He competed in the sprint event at the 2013 UCI Track Cycling World Championships and also at the 2016 UCI Track Cycling World Championships – Men's sprint where he reached the 1/16th Final. At the 2017 UCI Track Cycling World Championships – Men's sprint he reached the 1/8th Final. He participated at the 2014 Central American and Caribbean Games in Veracruz, Mexico and won bronze in the Elite Sprint. He participated in the 2015 Pan Am Games in Toronto, Ontario, Canada where he was ranked 9th in the Men's Sprint and 6th in the Men's Keirin.

== Achievements ==
He won gold at the Caribbean Track Cycling Championships 2017 and bronze at the 2017 Pan American Track Cycling Championships both in the 200m Men Elite Sprint. In 2016, he already won silver in the Elite Sprint at the 2016 Pan American Track Cycling Championships, in Mexico, a first ever for his country.

Tjon En Fa also won the 2017 Festival of Speed, a UCI Class 1 race in the event Men's Elite Sprint held in Trexlertown, Pennsylvania, in the United States). In 2015, already Tjon En Fa surprisingly won the UCI sprint tournament in the Golden Wheel/UCI Champions of Sprint at the Valley Preferred Cycling Center in Trexlertown. Beating favorite Trinidad's Njisane Phillip in straight rides in a best-of-three. In 2016, he repeated this win and hold on to the crown at the UCI 9th Festival of Speed Men's Elite Sprint in Pennsylvania, USA. He won bronze in the Elite Sprint at the 2014 Central American and Caribbean Games in Veracruz, Mexico.

In 2017, he was chosen to be "Sportsman of the Year" in his country Suriname.

== Results ==
=== 2008 ===
- Winner Suriname National Junior Championships 2008 on the road - Paramaribo, Suriname
- Winner Suriname National Junior Championships 2008 time trial on the road - Paramaribo, Suriname

=== 2009 ===
- 4th Place in the 2009 Ringwegrace - Paramaribo, Suriname
- Winner 2009 Guiana Seafoods Race, (Tour de Commewijne) - Commewijne, Suriname
- Winner 2009 National Championship on the road, Elite - Paramaribo, Suriname
- Winner 2009 Inter-Guiana Games on the road for juniors, team time trial - Paramaribo, Suriname with Moses Rickets + Murvin Arumjo + Nigel Sloot
- Winner 2009 Inter-Guiana Games on the road for juniors, roadrace - Paramaribo, Suriname
- 4th Place in the 2009 National Championships on the road, Individual time trial, Elite - Paramaribo, Suriname
- Silver Runner-Up in the 2009 Caribbean Junior Championships, Juvenile Boys 17.2K time trial Category on the road - Hamilton, Bermuda
- Bronze 3rd Place in the 2009 Caribbean Junior Championships, Juvenile Boys 52K Category on the road - Hamilton, Bermuda

=== 2010 ===
- Winner 2010 Wotula race - Suriname
- 5th Place in the 2010 Houttuin Race - Paramaribo, Suriname
- Bronze 3rd Place in the 2010 Sydney Monticieuex Race - Paramaribo, Suriname
- Runner-Up in the 2010 Tour van Posu, Groningen, Saramacca, Suriname
- Winner 2010 Inter-Guiana Games, team time trial Georgetown, Guyana with Murvin Arumjo + Nigel Sloot + Leslie Cairo

=== 2011 ===
- 8th Place in the 2011 Pan American Junior Cycling Championships (Campeonato Panamericano Pista Junior), Men Junior - Sprint - Mar del Plata, Argentina
- 10th Place in the 2011 Pan American Junior Cycling Championships (Campeonato Panamericano Pista Junior), Men Junior - Keirin - Mar del Plata, Argentina
- 39th Place in the 2011 UCI Juniors Track World Championships, Men Junior - Sprint - Moscow, Russia
- 37th Place in the 2011 UCI Juniors Track World Championships, Men Junior - Keirin - Moscow, Russia
- 45th Place in the 2011-2012 UCI World Cup II, Men Elite - Sprint - Cali, Colombia
- 26th Place in the 2011-2012 UCI World Cup II, Men Elite - Keirin - Cali, Colombia

=== 2012 ===
- 13th Place in the 2012 Pan American Cycling Championships (2012 Campeonato Panamericano Pista), Men Elite - Keirin - Mar del Plata, Argentina
- 19th Place in the 2012 Pan American Cycling Championships (2012 Campeonato Panamericano Pista), Men Elite - Sprint - Mar del Plata, Argentina
- Runner-Up in the 2012 Grand Prix Sprint Apeldoorn, Men Elite - Sprint - Omnisport Apeldoorn (Gelderland), the Netherlands
- 13th Place in the 2012 Grand Prix Sprint Apeldoorn, Men Elite - Keirin - Omnisport Apeldoorn (Gelderland), the Netherlands
- 23rd Place in the 2012-2013 UCI World Cup II, Men Elite - Sprint - Glasgow, Great Britain
- 19th Place in the 2012-2013 UCI World Cup II, Men Elite - Keirin - Glasgow, Great Britain

=== 2013 ===
- 40th Place in the 2013 UCI Track Cycling World Championships, Men Elite - Sprint - Minsk, Belarus
- Winner 2013 Los Angeles Teamsprint - Los Angeles (California), USA with Matthew Baranoski + David Espinoza + Nathan Koch + Geoffrey Fryer + Steven Herzfeld
- Bronze 3rd Place in the 2013 Los Angeles Sprint, Los Angeles (California), USA

=== 2014 ===
- 4th Place in the 2014 South American Games, Men Elite - Sprint - Santiago de Chile
- 8th Place in the 2014 South American Games, Men Elite - Keirin - Santiago de Chile
- Bronze 3rd Place in the 2014 Los Angeles, Men Keirin - Los Angeles (California), United States of America
- Winner 2014 Los Angeles, Men Sprint - Los Angeles (California), United States of America
- Bronze 3rd Place in the 2014 Central American and Caribbean Games, Men Elite - Sprint - Velodrome Xalapa Veracruz, Mexico

=== 2015 ===
- 12th Place in the 2014-2015 UCI World Cup III, Men Elite - Sprint - Cali, Colombia
- Runner-Up in the 2015 U.S. Sprint GP, (Trexlertown Champions of Sprint), Men Elite - Sprint - Trexlertown, Pennsylvania, USA
- Bronze 3rd Place in the 2015 Festival of Speed - Red Robin Finals, Men Elite - Sprint - Trexlertown, Pennsylvania, USA
- 6th Place in the 2015 Festival of Speed - Red Robin Finals, Men Elite - Keirin - Trexlertown, Pennsylvania, USA
- 9th Place in the 2015 Pan American Games, Men Elite - Sprint - Milton Velodrome, Ontario, Canada
- 6th Place in the 2015 Pan American Games, Men Elite - Keirin - Milton Velodrome, Ontario, Canada
- Winner 2015 Golden Wheel Race / UCI Champions of Sprint, Men Elite - Sprint - Trexlertown, Pennsylvania, USA
- 9th Place in the 2015 Pan American Track Cycling Championships, Men Elite - Sprint - Santiago de Chile
- 12th Place in the 2015 Pan American Track Cycling Championships, Men Elite - Keirin - Santiago de Chile
- 19th Place in the 2015-2016 UCI World Cup I, Men Elite - Sprint - Cali, Colombia
- 25th Place in the 2015-2016 UCI World Cup I, Men Elite - Keirin - Cali, Colombia
- 29th Place in the 2015-2016 UCI World Cup II, Men Elite - Sprint - Cambridge, New Zealand
- 25th Place in the 2015-2016 UCI World Cup II, Men Elite - Keirin - Cambridge, New Zealand

=== 2016 ===
- 32nd Place in the 2015-2016 UCI World Cup III, Men Elite - Sprint - Hong Kong Velodrome, Hong Kong
- 23rd Place in the 2016 UCI Track Cycling World Championships – Men's sprint - Lee Valley VeloPark's velodrome London, Great Britain
- Winner 2016 UCI US Sprint Gran Prix (2016 World Series of Bicycling), Men Elite - Sprint - Trexlertown, Pennsylvania, USA
- Winner 2016 UCI Festival of Speed, (Trexlertown Champions of Sprint), Men Elite - Sprint - Trexlertown, Pennsylvania, USA
- 11th Place in the 2016 UCI Festival of Speed, (Trexlertown Champions of Sprint), Men Elite - Keirin - Trexlertown, Pennsylvania, USA
- Winner 2016 Milton Challenge, Men Elite - Sprint - Milton, Ontario, Canada
- Winner 2016 Milton Challenge, Men Elite - Keirin - Milton, Ontario, Canada
- Silver Runner-Up in the 2016 Pan American Track Cycling Championships, Men Elite - Sprint - Velódromo Bicentenario Aguascalientes, Mexico
- 8th Place in the 2016 UCI World Cup II, Men Elite - Sprint - Omnisport Apeldoorn (Gelderland), the Netherlands

=== 2017 ===
- 15th Place in the 2016-2017 UCI World Cup III, Men Elite - Sprint - Cali, Colombia
- 16th Place in the 2017 UCI Track Cycling World Championships – Men's sprint - Hong Kong Velodrome, Hong Kong
- Winner 2017 UCI US Sprint Gran Prix (2017 World Series of Bicycling), Men Elite - Sprint - Trexlertown, Pennsylvania, United States of America
- 10th Place in the 2017 UCI Red Robin All-Stars, Men Elite - Keirin Final - Trexlertown, Pennsylvania United States of America
- 12th Place in the 2017 UCI Fastest Man on Wheels, Men Elite - Keirin - Trexlertown, Pennsylvania, United States of America
- Winner 2017 UCI Festival of Speed - Red Robin Finals, (Trexlertown Champions of Sprint), Men Elite - Sprint - Trexlertown, Pennsylvania, USA
- Bronze 3rd Place in the 2017 Pan American Track Cycling Championships, Men Elite - Sprint - National Cycling Centre Balmain Couva, Trinidad and Tobago
- 8th Place in the 2017-2018 UCI World Cup III, Men Elite - Sprint - Milton, Canada
- 8th Place in the 2017-2018 UCI World Cup IV, Men Elite - Sprint - Santiago de Chile, Chile
