= Joel Archambault =

Canadian cyclist

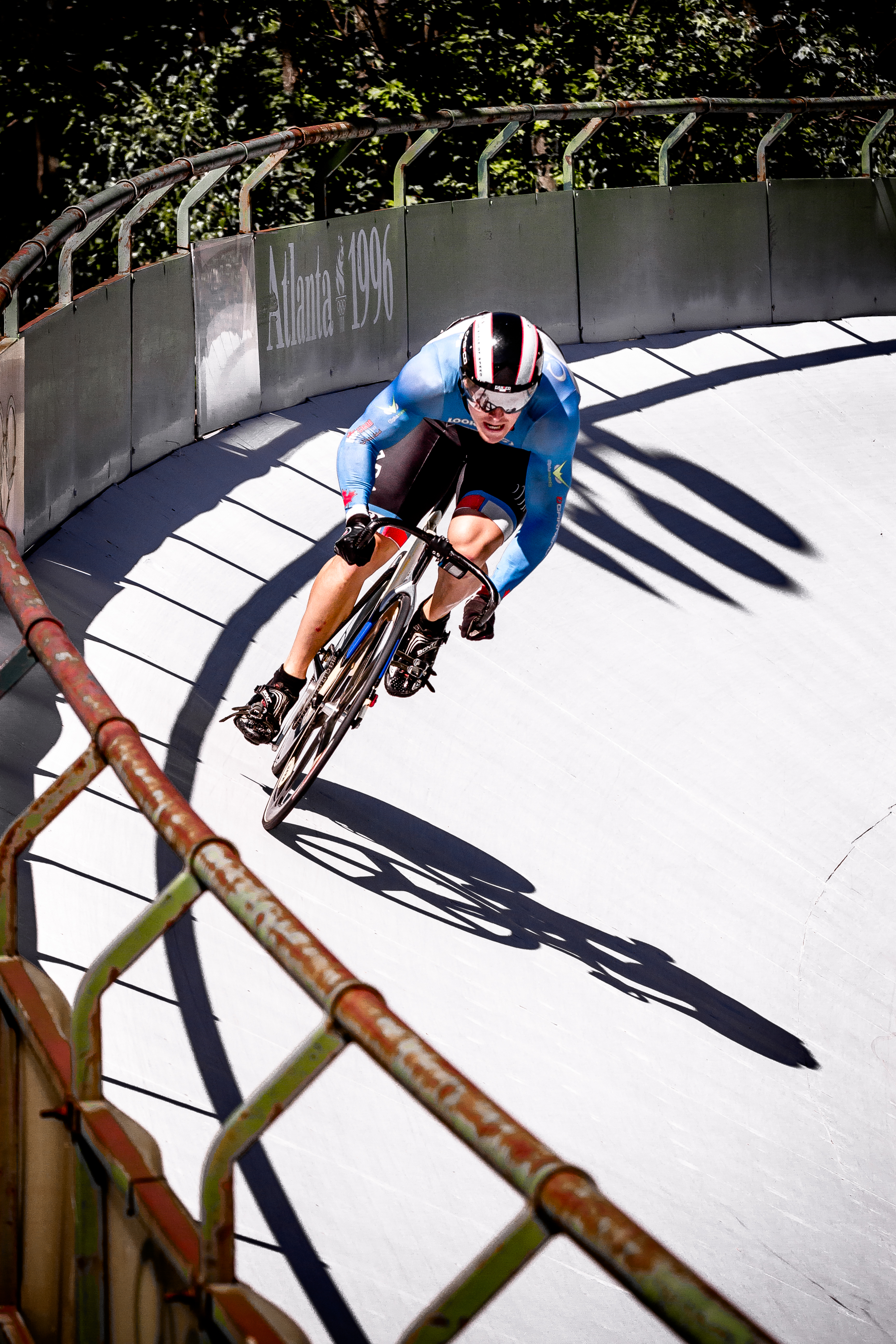
- Archambault in 2016

Personal information
- Born: 7 April 1992 (age 34)

Cycling career
- Sport: Cycling
- Discipline: Track cycling
Medal record
Men's track cycling
Representing Canada
Pan American Track Cycling Championships
Bronze medal – third place	2016 Aguascalientes	Team sprint

Joel Archambault (born 7 April 1992) is a Canadian male track cyclist, representing Canada at international competitions. He won the bronze medal at the 2016 Pan American Track Cycling Championships in the team sprint.
