= Njisane Phillip =

Trinidadian cyclist (born 1991)

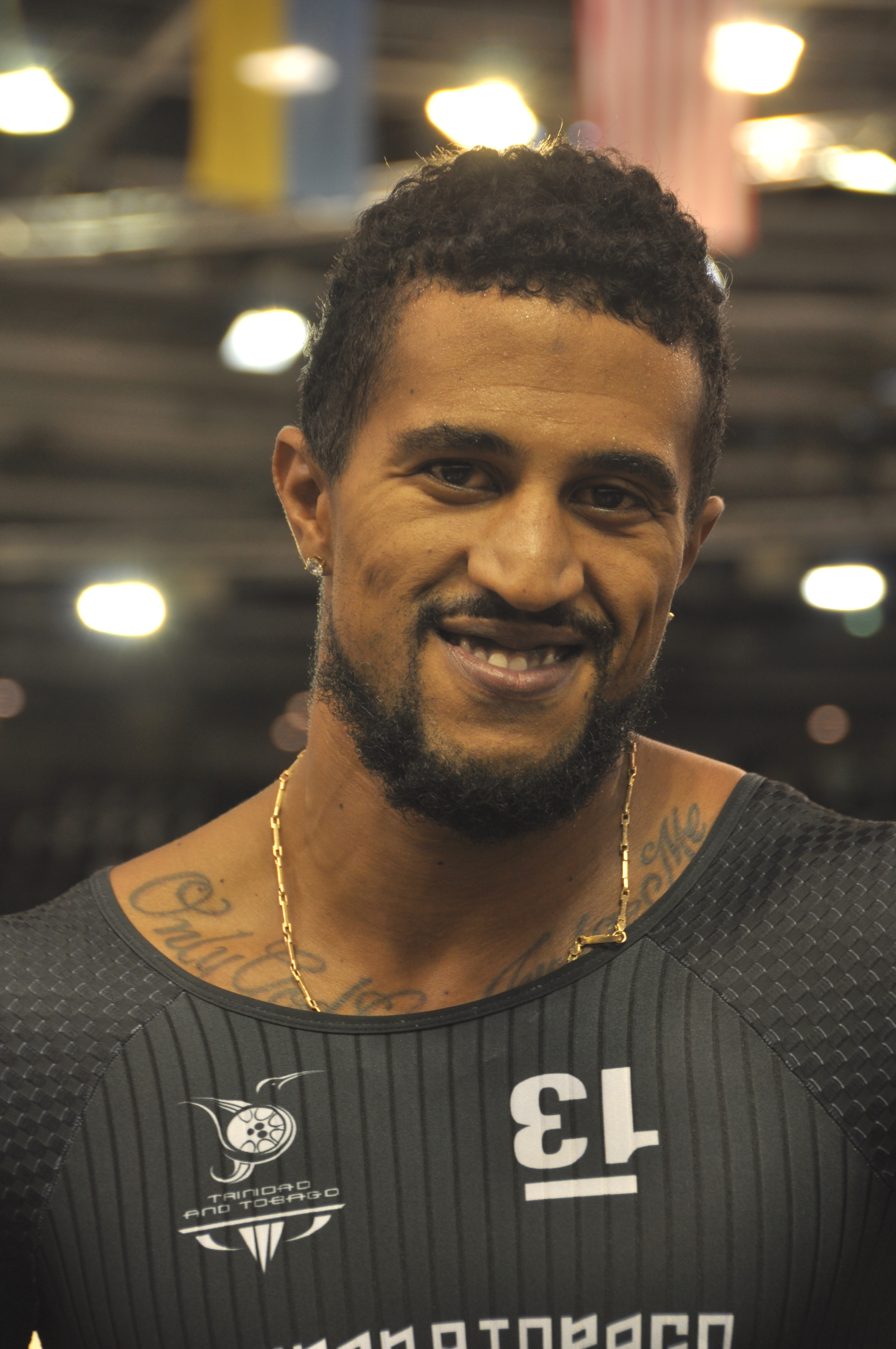
- Njisane Phillip (2018)

Personal information
- Full name: Njisane Nicholas Phillip
- Nicknames: Jay, J-boy
- Born: 29 May 1991 (age 35) Siparia, Trinidad and Tobago
- Height: 1.85 m (6 ft 1 in)
- Weight: 88 kg (194 lb)

Cycling career
- Sport: Cycling
- Discipline: Track
- Role: Cyclist

Major wins
- Pan American Champion
Medal record
Men's Track Cycling
Representing Trinidad and Tobago
Pan American Games
Disqualified	2019 Lima	Team sprint
Silver medal – second place	2015 Toronto	Sprint
Disqualified	2019 Lima	Sprint
Bronze medal – third place	2011 Guadalajara	Sprint
Pan American Championships
Gold medal – first place	2012 Mar del Plata	Sprint
Gold medal – first place	2018 Aguascalientes	Team sprint
Gold medal – first place	2019 Cochabamba	Team sprint
Gold medal – first place	2025 Asunción	Team sprint
Silver medal – second place	2010 Aguascalientes	Sprint
Silver medal – second place	2015 Santiago	Sprint
Silver medal – second place	2017 Couva	Team sprint
Silver medal – second place	2021 Lima	Team sprint
Bronze medal – third place	2010 Aguascalientes	Team sprint
Bronze medal – third place	2011 Medellin	Sprint
Bronze medal – third place	2021 Lima	Keirin
Central American and Caribbean Games
Gold medal – first place	2010 Mayagüez	Sprint
Silver medal – second place	2010 Mayagüez	Team sprint

Njisane Nicholas Phillip (born 29 May 1991) is a Trinidadian track cyclist active. Born in Siparia, he competed for Trinidad and Tobago at the 2012 Summer Olympics, where he achieved a fourth place finish in the individual sprint, as well as at the 2014 and 2018 Commonwealth Games. and at several Pan American Games and Championships. In the latter, he was the 2012 Pan American Championships sprint champion.

He is credited with reviving track cycling in his country, and the end of his career coincided with the rise of his compatriot World Championship silver medalist, Nicholas Paul. He retired after the 2019 Pan American Games.

Phillip's later career and early retirement were clouded by recreational drug issues. He was stripped of a gold and silver medal from the 2019 Pan American Games after a doping sample was found to contain cannabis, a prohibited though not performance enhancing drug. In 2023, Phillip was arrested and bailed after being found in possession of marijuana and a loaded pistol.

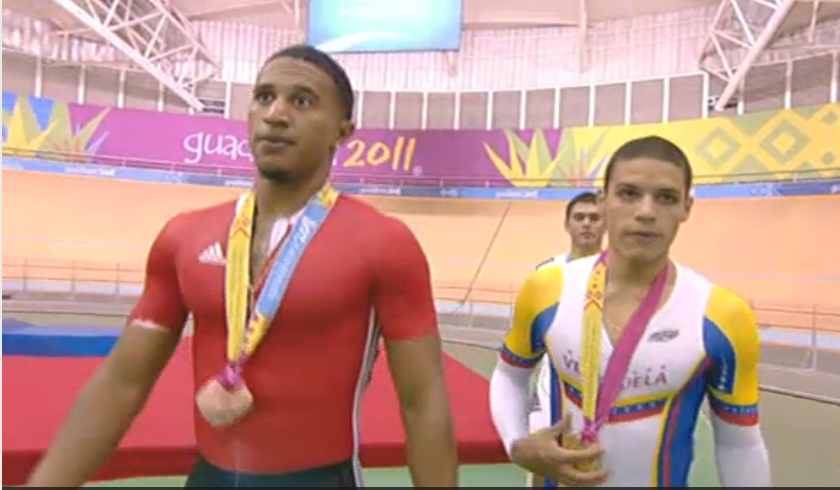
Phillip (left)

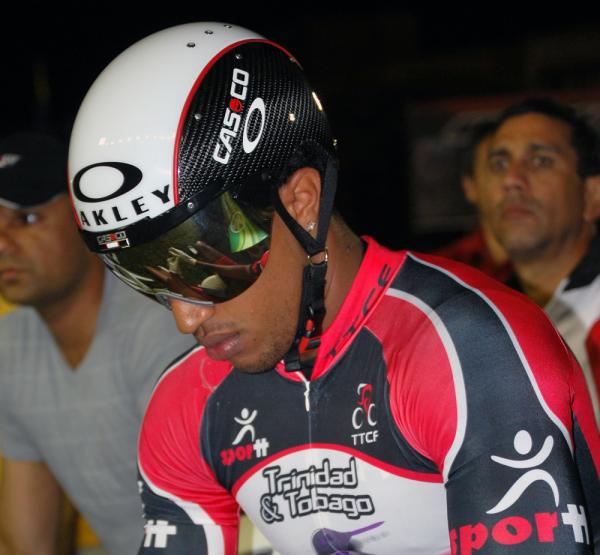

== Palmarès ==
2009
1st Trinidad and Tobago National Championships – Junior road race
2010
Central American and Caribbean Games

1st Sprint
3rd Team sprint

Pan American Road and Track Championships

3rd Team sprint

2011
US Grand Prix of Sprinting

1st Sprint
1st Keirin

Pan American Games

3rd Sprint

2012
Pan American Road and Track Championships

1st Sprint

Summer Olympics

4th Sprint

2013
1st Goloconda – Chase Village
1st Keirin, Madison Cup
1st Sprint, Challenge International sur piste
Fastest Man on Wheels

1st Sprint
2nd Keirin

2nd Sprint, Round 1 – Manchester, 2013–14 UCI Track Cycling World Cup
3rd Sprint, US Grand Prix of Sprinting
