= Hugo Barrette =

Canadian cyclist (born 1991)

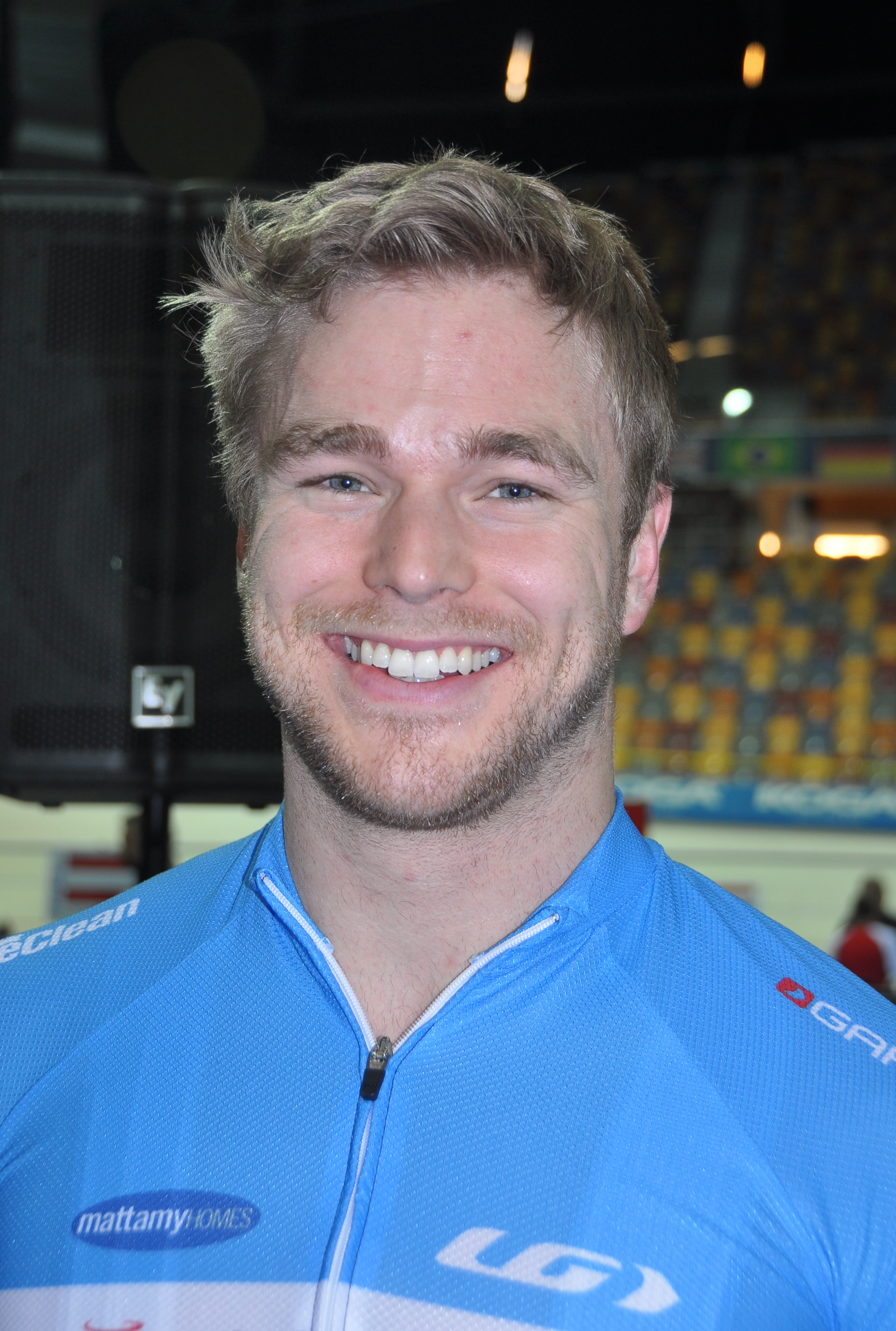

Personal information
- Born: 4 July 1991 (age 34) Cap-aux-Meules, Quebec, Canada

Sport
- Sport: Track cycling
Medal record
Representing Canada
Men's track cycling
Pan American Games
Gold medal – first place	2015 Toronto	Sprint
Gold medal – first place	2015 Toronto	Team sprint
Bronze medal – third place	2015 Toronto	Keirin
Pan American Championships
Gold medal – first place	2017 Couva	Sprint
Gold medal – first place	2018 Aguascalientes	Sprint
Gold medal – first place	2018 Aguascalientes	Keirin
Silver medal – second place	2012 Mar del Plata	Team sprint
Silver medal – second place	2013 Mexico City	Team sprint
Silver medal – second place	2014 Aguascalientes	Keirin
Silver medal – second place	2015 Santiago	Team sprint
Silver medal – second place	2017 Couva	Keirin
Bronze medal – third place	2015 Santiago	Sprint

Hugo Barrette (born 4 July 1991) is a Canadian cyclist, specializing in track time trials. Barrette is from the Magdalen Islands, Quebec and now lives in Santa Monica, California, in the USA.

== Records ==
On 28 August 2014 at Aguascalientes, he set a new Canadian record in the flying 200 m time trial of 9.77 seconds. The following day, he broke the 1 km against the clock record with a time of 1:00:9. With his teammates Joseph Veloce and Stéphane Cossette, he also holds the Canadian record in team sprints; the team achieved a time of 43.922 seconds at the Panamerican Cycling Championships in Mexico City on 7 February 2013.

== Injuries ==
In 2015, Hugo Barrette survived a horrific crash while training for a UCI World Cup in Cali, Colombia, with two broken lumbar vertebrae, a broken nose, split lip, concussion, neck dislocation and severe contusions. At the World Track Cycling Championships in Pruszkow, Poland, Hugo Barrette had an accident as he exited the fourth turn at full speed while the German Lea Sophie Friedrich was climbing the track. During the same year, in 2019, he fell off his bike and broke his scapula, one of the strongest bones. Since he had qualified to represent Canada at the 2020 Summer Olympics, the postponement of one year of the Tokyo Olympics was a blessing.

== Tokyo 2020 Olympic Games ==
Hugo Barrette represented Canada at the 2020 Summer Olympics.
