= Hersony Canelón =

Venezuelan cyclist (born 1988)

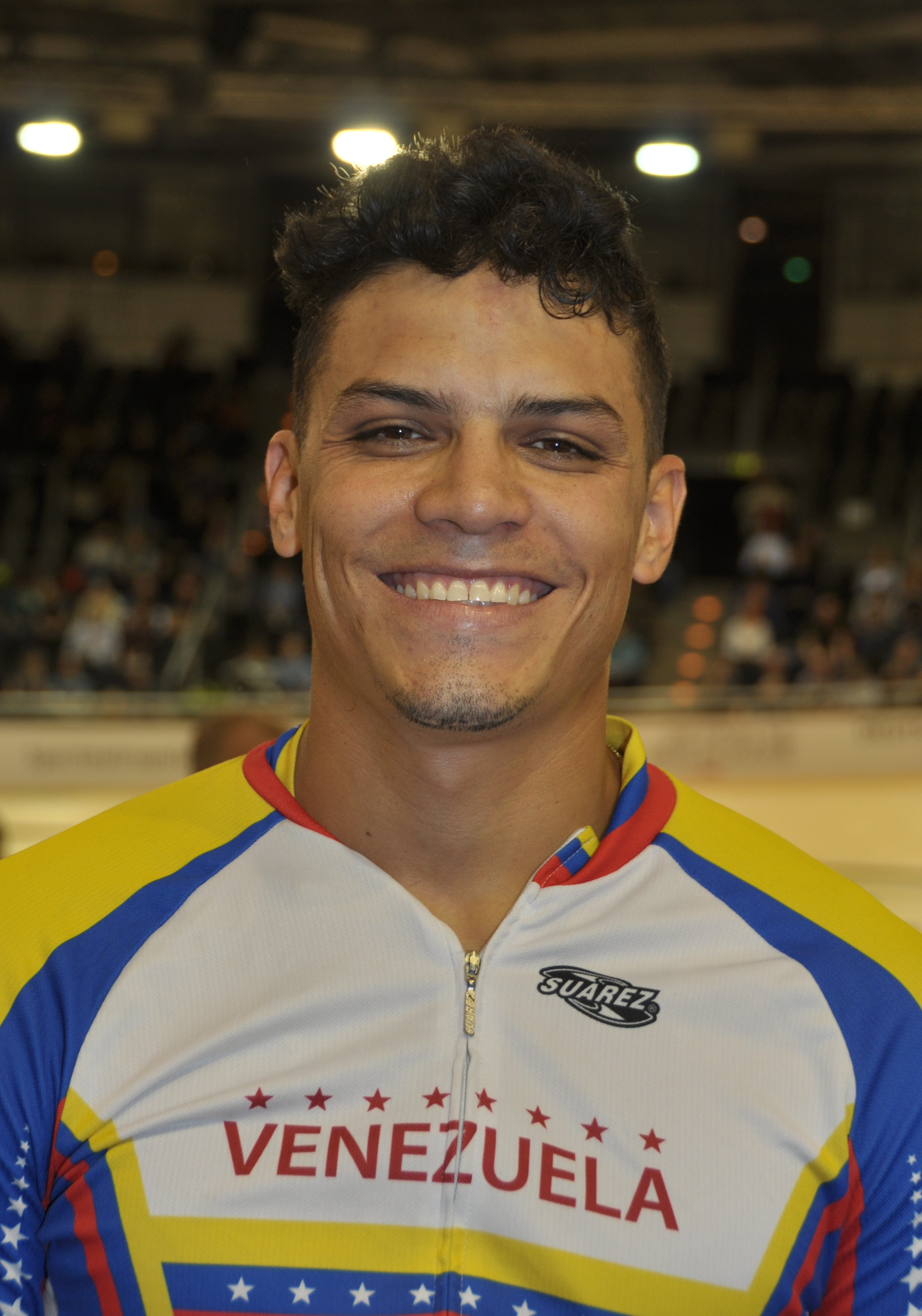
- Canelón in 2018

Personal information
- Full name: Hersony Gadiel Canelón Vera
- Born: 8 December 1988 (age 37)

Cycling career
- Sport: Cycling
- Discipline: Track
- Role: Rider
- Rider type: Sprinter
Medal record
Representing Venezuela
Men's track cycling
Pan American Games
Gold medal – first place	2011 Guadalajara	Sprint
Gold medal – first place	2011 Guadalajara	Team sprint
Silver medal – second place	2007 Rio de Janeiro	Team sprint
Silver medal – second place	2011 Guadalajara	Keirin
Silver medal – second place	2015 Toronto	Team sprint
Silver medal – second place	2015 Toronto	Keirin
Silver medal – second place	2019 Lima	Keirin
Bronze medal – third place	2015 Toronto	Sprint
Bronze medal – third place	2019 Lima	Sprint
Pan American Championships
Gold medal – first place	2011 Medellin	Sprint
Gold medal – first place	2013 Mexico City	Sprint
Gold medal – first place	2013 Mexico City	Team sprint
Gold medal – first place	2014 Aguascalientes	Sprint
Gold medal – first place	2014 Aguascalientes	Team sprint
Gold medal – first place	2015 Santiago	Team sprint
Silver medal – second place	2010 Aguascalientes	Team sprint
Silver medal – second place	2011 Medellin	Keirin
Silver medal – second place	2012 Mar del Plata	Sprint
Silver medal – second place	2015 Santiago	Keirin
Bronze medal – third place	2011 Medellin	Team sprint
Bronze medal – third place	2012 Mar del Plata	Team sprint
Bronze medal – third place	2014 Aguascalientes	Keirin

Hersony Gadiel Canelón Vera (born 8 December 1988, Caracas) is a male professional track and road cyclist from Venezuela. He won a silver medal for his native country at the 2007 Pan American Games in Rio de Janeiro, Brazil, alongside César Marcano and Andris Hernández in the Men's Track Team Sprint, and won a gold in 2010. He competed in men's track cycling at the 2012 Summer Olympics in London and the 2016 Games in Rio.

== Career ==
2007
in Pan American Games, Track, Team Sprint, Rio de Janeiro (BRA)
2010
in Central American and Caribbean Games, Track, Team Sprint, Mayagüez (PUR)
in Central American and Caribbean Games, Track, Keirin, Mayagüez (PUR)
in Central American and Caribbean Games, Sprint, Mayagüez (PUR)
in Pan American Road and Track Championships, Track, Team Sprint, Aguascalientes (MEX)
2011
in Pan American Games, Track, Sprint, Guadalajara (MEX)
in Pan American Games, Track, Team Sprint, Guadalajara (MEX)
in Pan American Games, Track, Keirin, Guadalajara (MEX)
in Round 2 2011–12 UCI Track Cycling World Cup, Team Sprint, Cali (COL)
in Round 2 2011–12 UCI Track Cycling World Cup, Keirin, Cali (COL)
2012
in Pan American Road and Track Championships, Track, Sprint, Mar del Plata (ARG)
in Pan American Road and Track Championships, Track, Team Sprint, Mar del Plata (ARG)
2013
in Pan American Road and Track Championships, Track, Team Sprint, Mexico City (MEX)
in Pan American Road and Track Championships, Track, Flying Lap, Mexico City (MEX)
in Pan American Road and Track Championships, Track, Sprint, Mexico City (MEX)
in Venezuelan National Championships, Track, Sprint
in Venezuelan National Championships, Track, Keirin
in Copa Cobernador, Sprint, Carabobo (VEN)
in Copa Cobernador, Keirin, Carabobo (VEN)
in Round 1 2013–14 UCI Track Cycling World Cup, Keirin, Manchester (GBR)
