= Matthew Baranoski =

American cyclist

Personal information
- Born: July 27, 1993 (age 33) Perkasie, Pennsylvania, United States

Cycling career
- Sport: Cycling
- Discipline: Track
- Role: Rider
- Rider type: Sprinter

Matthew Baranoski (born July 27, 1993) is an American professional racing cyclist. He rode at the 2015 UCI Track Cycling World Championships. He also competed at the 2016 Summer Olympics in the keirin.

== See also ==
- List of Pennsylvania State University Olympians
