= Leandro Bottasso =

Argentine cyclist (born 1986)

Personal information
- Full name: Leandro Hernán Bottasso
- Born: 23 April 1986 (age 40)

Cycling career
- Sport: Cycling
- Discipline: Track cycling
Medal record
Representing Argentina
Men's track cycling
Pan American Games
Bronze medal – third place	2007 Rio de Janeiro	Keirin
Bronze medal – third place	2011 Guadalajara	Keirin
Bronze medal – third place	2019 Lima	Keirin
Pan American Championships
Gold medal – first place	2006 São Paulo	Keirin
Silver medal – second place	2006 São Paulo	Team sprint
Silver medal – second place	2012 Mar del Plata	Keirin
Silver medal – second place	2016 Aguascalientes	Keirin
Silver medal – second place	2016 Aguascalientes	Team sprint
Bronze medal – third place	2013 Mexico City	Keirin
Bronze medal – third place	2017 Couva	Keirin
Bronze medal – third place	2017 Couva	Team sprint
Bronze medal – third place	2021 Lima	Team sprint

Leandro Hernán Bottasso (born 23 April 1986) is an Argentinian professional track and road cyclist. In 2009, he was a member of the Colavita–Sutter Home cycling team.

== Career ==
2007
(bronze) in Pan American Games, Track, Keirin, Rio de Janeiro (BRA)
2009
5th in GP Aniversario Ciudad de Villa María (ARG)
