= Kacio Fonseca =

Brazilian cyclist (born 1994)

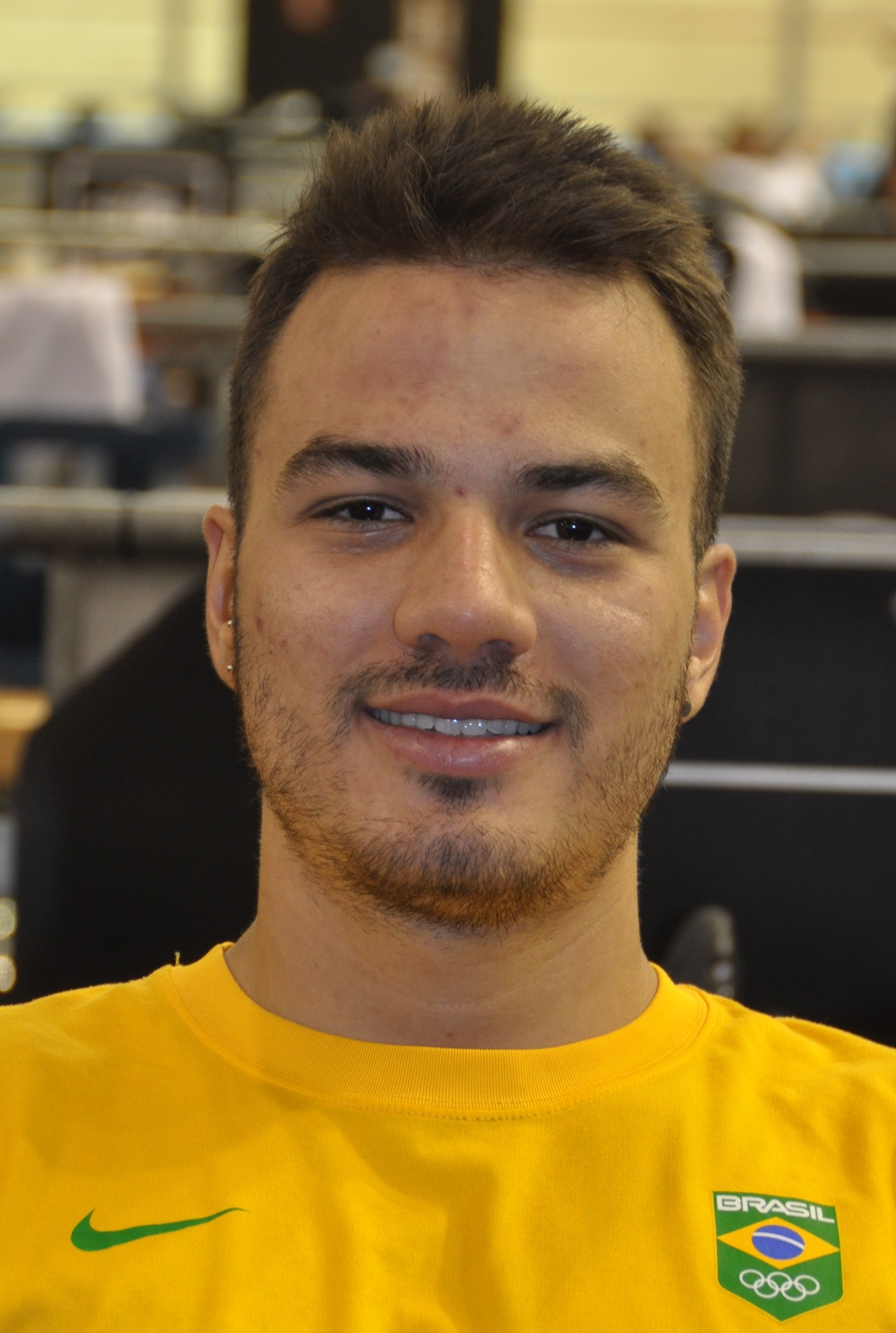
- Fonseca in 2018

Personal information
- Full name: Kacio Fonseca da Silva Freitas
- Born: 13 May 1994 (age 32)

Cycling career
- Sport: Cycling
- Discipline: Track cycling
- Role: Rider
- Rider type: team sprint
Medal record
Men's track cycling
Representing Brazil
Pan American Games
Bronze medal – third place	2015 Toronto	Team sprint
Disqualified	2019 Lima	Team sprint
Pan American Championships
Bronze medal – third place	2014 Aguascalientes	Team sprint
Bronze medal – third place	2015 Santiago	Keirin
Bronze medal – third place	2015 Santiago	Team sprint
Bronze medal – third place	2018 Aguascalientes	Team sprint

Kacio Fonseca da Silva Freitas (born 13 May 1994) is a Brazilian male track cyclist. He competed in the team sprint event at the 2015 UCI Track Cycling World Championships.
