= Flávio Cipriano =

Brazilian cyclist (born 1990)

Personal information
- Full name: Flávio Vagner Cipriano
- Born: 24 January 1990 (age 36)

Cycling career
- Sport: Cycling
- Role: Rider
Medal record
Pan American Games
Bronze medal – third place	2015 Toronto	Team sprint
Pan American Championships
Bronze medal – third place	2014 Aguascalientes	Team sprint
Bronze medal – third place	2015 Santiago	Team sprint
Bronze medal – third place	2018 Aguascalientes	Team sprint

Flávio Vagner Cipriano (born 24 January 1990) is a Brazilian professional racing cyclist. He rode at the 2015 UCI Track Cycling World Championships.
