= Tennis at the 2015 Pan American Games – Qualification =

Qualification
- Tennis at the 2015 Pan American Games

Events
Singles	men	women
Doubles	men	women	mixed
Qualification
- Pan American Games

== Qualification system ==
A total of 80 tennis players will qualify to compete at the Games (48 men and 32 women). Each country is allowed to enter a maximum of three male and three female athletes (with one pair maximum in each of the doubles events). The singles events will consist of 48 men and 32 women respectively, with those athletes competing in the doubles events. The host nation Canada was allowed to enter with a maximum team of 6 athletes, while the remaining spots were distributed using the ATP rankings and WTA rankings. A further four wildcards for men and one for women was also awarded.

== Qualification summary ==
The quota allocation was released on June 5, 2015.

== Qualification summary ==
Nation	Men		Women		Mixed	Total
Nation	Singles	Doubles	Singles	Doubles	Doubles	Athletes
Argentina	2	X	2	X	X	4
Bahamas	1					1
Barbados	3	X				3
Bolivia	3	X	1		X	4
Brazil	3	X	3	X	X	6
Canada	3	X	3	X	X	6
Chile	2	X	3	X	X	5
Colombia	3	X	2	X	X	5
Costa Rica	1					1
Cuba	2	X				2
Dominican Republic	1		1		X	2
Ecuador	3	X	1		X	4
El Salvador	1					1
Grenada	1					1
Guatemala	2	X	1			3
Honduras	2	X				2
Mexico	3	X	3	X	X	6
Paraguay	1		3	X	X	4
Peru			1			1
Puerto Rico			1			1
United States	3	X	3	X	X	6
Uruguay	3	X				3
Venezuela	2	X	2		X	4
Total: 23 NOCs	45	15	30	8	12	75

=== Men's singles ===
Event	Vacancies	Qualifiers
Hosts	3	Peter Polansky (CAN); Philip Bester (CAN); Brayden Schnur (CAN)
World ranking	41	Facundo Bagnis (ARG); ~~Guido Pella (ARG)~~; Guido Andreozzi (ARG); Nicolás Jarry (CHI); Dennis Novikov (USA); Giovanni Lapentti (ECU); Hans Podlipnik (CHI); Darian King (BAR); ~~Cristian Garín (CHI)~~; Hugo Dellien (BOL); Nicolás Barrientos (COL); Gonzalo Escobar (ECU); Marcelo Arévalo (ESA); Eduardo Struvay (COL); Emilio Gómez (ECU); Ricardo Rodríguez (VEN); Christopher Diaz (GUA); Jean-Yves Aubone (USA); Federico Zeballos (BOL); Orlando Luz (BRA); Hans Hach (MEX); João Menezes (BRA); Manuel Sánchez (MEX); Luis David Martinez (VEN); Carlos Salamanca (COL); Luis Patiño (MEX); Marcelo Zormann (BRA); Rodrigo Banzer (BOL); Rodrigo Senattore (URU); Julian Saborio (CRC); ~~Alex Llompart (PUR)~~; Roberto Subervy (DOM); Rodrigo Arus (URU); Gonzales Austin (USA); Ariel Behar (URU); ~~Roberto Maytín (VEN)~~; Haydn Lewis (BAR); ~~Rafael Gonzalez (ESA)~~; Diego Galeano (PAR); Wilfredo Gonzalez (GUA); Philip Major (BAH); Seanon Williams (BAR); Alejandro Obando (HON)
Wildcards	4	William Geronimo Dorantes (CUB); Omar Alberto Hernandez (CUB); Kenny Turcios (HON); Yannik James (GRN)
Total	~~48~~ 45	

=== Men's doubles ===
Event	Vacancies	Qualifiers
Host	1	Canada
World ranking	13	Argentina; Barbados; Bolivia; Brazil; Chile; Colombia; Ecuador; ~~El Salvador~~; Guatemala; Honduras; Mexico; United States; Uruguay; Venezuela
Wildcard	1	Cuba
Total	15	

=== Women's singles ===
Event	Vacancies	Qualifiers
Hosts	3	Carol Zhao (CAN); Gabriela Dabrowski (CAN); Françoise Abanda (CAN)
World ranking	28	Lauren Davis (USA); Monica Puig (PUR); Mariana Duque Mariño (COL); Louisa Chirico (USA); Sachia Vickery (USA); María Irigoyen (ARG); Beatriz Haddad Maia (BRA); Paula Ormaechea (ARG); Verónica Cepede Royg (PAR); Marcela Zacarías (MEX); Bianca Botto (PER); Gabriela Cé (BRA); Paula Cristina Gonçalves (BRA); Ana Sofia Sanchez (MEX); Montserrat Gonzalez (PAR); Victoria Rodríguez (MEX); Andrea Gámiz (VEN); Fernanda Brito (CHI); ~~Nadia Podoroska (ARG)~~; Andrea Koch (CHI); Francesca Segarelli (DOM); ~~Yuliana Lizarazo (COL)~~; Daniela Seguel (CHI); Camila Giangreco (PAR); Mariaryeni Gutiérrez (VEN); Charlotte Römer (ECU); Maria Herazo Gonzalez (COL); Andrea Weedon (GUA)
Wildcard	1	Maria Fernanda Alvarez (BOL)
Total	~~32~~ 30	

=== Women's doubles ===
Event	Vacancies	Qualifiers
Host	1	Canada
World ranking	7	Argentina; Brazil; Chile; Colombia; Mexico; Paraguay; United States
Total	8	

=== Mixed doubles ===
Event	Vacancies	Qualifiers
Host	1	Canada
World ranking	11	Argentina; Bolivia; Brazil; Chile; Colombia; Dominican Republic; Ecuador; Mexico; Paraguay; ~~Puerto Rico~~; United States; Venezuela
Total	11	
