= Golf at the 2015 Pan American Games – Qualification =

== Qualification system ==
A total of 64 athletes (32 men and 32 women) qualified to compete at the games. A nation could enter a maximum of two athletes per gender. As host nation, Canada automatically qualified a full team of four athletes. All other athletes qualified through the Official World Golf Ranking and Women's World Golf Rankings (and if necessary) the World Amateur Golf Ranking as of April 28, 2015 and April 30, 2015 respectively. All nations qualifying in the men's and women's singles events will also qualify for the mixed team event.

== Summary ==
NOC	Men	Women	Mixed team	Athletes
Argentina	2	2	X	4
Barbados	1			1
Bolivia	2	2	X	4
Brazil	2	2	X	4
Canada	2	1	X	4
Chile	2	2	X	4
Colombia	2	2	X	4
Costa Rica	1			1
Ecuador	2	2	X	4
Guatemala	2	2	X	4
Jamaica	1			1
Mexico	2	2	X	4
Paraguay	1	2	X	3
Peru	2	2	X	4
Puerto Rico	1	1	X	2
Trinidad and Tobago	2	2	X	4
United States	2	2	X	4
Uruguay	1	2	X	3
Venezuela	2	2	X	4
Virgin Islands		1		1
Total: 20 NOC's	32	31	16	63

== Qualifiers ==
Event	Quotas	Men	Women
Host nation	2/2	Canada; Canada	Canada; Canada
World rankings	12/9	United States; United States; Argentina; Argentina; Mexico; Paraguay; Colombia; Chile; Venezuela; Brazil; Chile; Colombia	United States; United States; Paraguay; Colombia; Chile; Colombia; Mexico; Venezuela; Mexico
World Amateur rankings	18/21	Venezuela; Costa Rica; Brazil; Uruguay; Bolivia; Mexico; Ecuador; Guatemala; Ecuador; Guatemala; Peru; Bolivia; Puerto Rico; Peru; Trinidad and Tobago; Trinidad and Tobago; Barbados; ~~Puerto Rico~~; Jamaica	Ecuador; Peru; Trinidad and Tobago; Guatemala; Paraguay; Puerto Rico; Argentina; Argentina; ~~Panama~~; Brazil; Peru; Ecuador; Venezuela; Uruguay; Brazil; Chile; ~~Puerto Rico~~; Bolivia; Trinidad and Tobago; Uruguay; Bolivia; Guatemala; Virgin Islands
Total	64	32	32
