= Tennis at the 2015 Pan American Games – Men's singles =

Tennis – Men's singles at the 2015 Pan American Games
- Venue: Canadian Tennis Centre
- Dates: July 10–15, 2015
- Competitors: 45 from 21 nations
- Gold medal match score: 6–1, 6–2

Medalists
Gold medal	Facundo Bagnis	Argentina
Silver medal	Nicolás Barrientos	Colombia
Bronze medal	Dennis Novikov	United States

Men's singles
- Tennis at the 2015 Pan American Games

Events
Singles	men	women
Doubles	men	women	mixed
Qualification
- Pan American Games

The men's singles tennis event of the 2015 Pan American Games was held from July 10–15 at the Canadian Tennis Centre in Toronto, Canada.

== Seeds ==
1. Facundo Bagnis (ARG) (champion, gold medalist)
2. Hans Podlipnik (CHI) (quarterfinals)
3. Guido Andreozzi (ARG) (semifinals)
4. Dennis Novikov (USA) (semifinals, bronze medalist)
5. Nicolás Jarry (CHI) (second round)
6. Giovanni Lapentti (ECU) (third round)
7. Darian King (BAR) (second round)
8. Nicolás Barrientos (COL) (final, silver medalist)
9. Gonzalo Escobar (ECU) (quarterfinals)
10. Hugo Dellien (BOL) (third round)
11. Marcelo Arévalo (ESA) (second round)
12. Eduardo Struvay (COL) (third round)
13. Philip Bester (CAN) (third round)
14. Emilio Gómez (ECU) (third round)
15. Ricardo Rodríguez (VEN) (third round)
16. Peter Polansky (CAN) (second round)

== Draw ==
Key

- Q = Qualifier
- WC = Wild card
- LL = Lucky loser
- Alt = Alternate
- ITF = ITF entry
- PR = Protected ranking
- SR = Special ranking
- SE = Special exempt
- JE = Junior exempt
- JR = Junior Accelerator Programme entrant
- CO = College Accelerator Programme entrant
- NG = Next Gen Accelerator Program entrant
- w/o = Walkover
- r = Retired
- d = Defaulted

=== Finals ===
Quarterfinals
1	Facundo Bagnis (ARG)	6	5	6
9	Gonzalo Escobar (ECU)	4	7	1
4	Dennis Novikov (USA)	6	6
Brayden Schnur (CAN)	3	4
Diego Galeano (PAR)	6	1	6^{6}
3	Guido Andreozzi (ARG)	2	6	7^{8}
8	Nicolás Barrientos (COL)	7	6
2	Hans Podlipnik (CHI)	5	2

Semifinals
1	Facundo Bagnis (ARG)	6	6^{1}	6
4	Dennis Novikov (USA)	3	7^{7}	2
3	Guido Andreozzi (ARG)	6^{8}	5
8	Nicolás Barrientos (COL)	7^{10}	7

Final (gold-medal match)
1	Facundo Bagnis (ARG)	6	6
8	Nicolás Barrientos (COL)	1	2
Bronze-medal match
4	Dennis Novikov (USA)	6	6
3	Guido Andreozzi (ARG)	4	4

=== Top half ===
==== Section 1 ====
First round
M Sánchez (MEX)	4	2
C Díaz Figueroa (GUA)	6	6
G Austin (USA)	6	6
F Zeballos (BOL)	1	2
A Behar (URU)	3	6^{2}
J Menezes (BRA)	6	7^{7}

Second round
1	F Bagnis (ARG)	6	4	6
C Díaz Figueroa (GUA)	2	6	3
G Austin (USA)	4	4
13	P Bester (CAN)	6	6
9	G Escobar (ECU)	6	6
W Dorantes (CUB)	2	0
J Menezes (BRA)	5	6	6
5	N Jarry (CHI)	7	3	4

Third round
1	F Bagnis (ARG)	4	6	6
13	P Bester (CAN)	6	3	4
9	G Escobar (ECU)	7^{7}	7^{7}
J Menezes (BRA)	6^{5}	6^{4}

Quarterfinals
1	F Bagnis (ARG)	6	5	6
9	G Escobar (ECU)	4	7	1

==== Section 2 ====
First round
A Obando (HON)	1	1
O Luz (BRA)	6	6
Y James (GRN)	6	4	6
P Major (BAH)	4	6	3
LD Martínez (VEN)	3	4
B Schnur (CAN)	6	6

Second round
4	D Novikov (USA)	6	7^{11}
O Luz (BRA)	1	6^{9}
R Senattore (URU)	3	2
14	E Gómez (ECU)	6	6
12	E Struvay (COL)	7	6
Y James (GRN)	5	2
B Schnur (CAN)	6	6
7	D King (BAR)	2	4

Third round
4	D Novikov (USA)	6^{6}	6	6
14	E Gómez (ECU)	7^{8}	3	4
12	E Struvay (COL)	4	6^{0}
B Schnur (CAN)	6	7^{7}

Quarterfinals
4	D Novikov (USA)	6	6
B Schnur (CAN)	3	4

=== Bottom half ===
==== Section 3 ====
First round
R Arús (URU)	7^{7}	7^{7}
S Williams (BAR)	6^{4}	6^{1}
D Galeano (PAR)	6	6
OA Hernández (CUB)	3	1
H Hach (MEX)	6	1	3
J-Y Aubone (USA)	3	6	6
C Salamanca (COL)	6	3	2
R Banzer (BOL)	3	6	6

Second round
6	G Lapentti (ECU)	6	6
R Arús (URU)	3	1
D Galeano (PAR)	7	6
11	M Arévalo (ESA)	5	3
15	R Rodríguez (VEN)	6	4	6
J-Y Aubone (USA)	3	6	1
R Banzer (BOL)	1	2
3	G Andreozzi (ARG)	6	6

Third round
6	G Lapentti (ECU)	3	2
D Galeano (PAR)	6	6
15	R Rodríguez (VEN)	3	1
3	G Andreozzi (ARG)	6	6

Quarterfinals
D Galeano (PAR)	6	1	6^{6}
3	G Andreozzi (ARG)	2	6	7^{8}

==== Section 4 ====
First round
J Saborío (CRC)	6	7
K Turcios (HON)	3	5
W González (GUA)	6	6
L Patiño (MEX)	3	1
M Zormann (BRA)	6	2	5
R Cid (DOM)	4	6	7

Second round
8	N Barrientos (COL)	4	6	6
J Saborío (CRC)	6	2	2
W González (GUA)	6^{5}	6	1
10	H Dellien (BOL)	7^{7}	0	6
16	P Polansky (CAN)	2	5
R Cid (DOM)	6	7
H Lewis (BAR)	1	1
2	H Podlipnik (CHI)	6	6

Third round
8	N Barrientos (COL)	6	3	6
10	H Dellien (BOL)	1	6	1
R Cid (DOM)	3	7	3
2	H Podlipnik (CHI)	6	5	6

Quarterfinals
8	N Barrientos (COL)	7	6
2	H Podlipnik (CHI)	5	2
