= Badminton at the 2015 Pan American Games – Qualification =

== Qualification system ==
A total of 88 athletes (44 men and 44 women) will qualify to compete at the games. A nation may enter a maximum of four athletes per gender. As host nation, Canada automatically qualifies a full team of eights athletes. All other athletes will qualify through the team world rankings as of February 26, 2015. The top ranked athlete/pair from each country in each event will have their points added together to get a country's total. The top three ranked will qualify eight athletes, the next four countries will qualify six each (three per gender) and the next four after that will qualify four each (two per gender). All other nations will qualify two athletes each (one per gender). Unranked nations may also request for quotas. If the entry total is more than 88 athletes, the continental federation will restrict team quotas to bring the total down to 88. If the total entry is less than 88, starting at the team ranked fourth will be given extra quotas (with a maximum of four per team).

== Qualification summary ==
NOC	Men	Women	Athletes
Argentina	3	3	6
Barbados	1	1	2
Brazil	4	4	8
Canada	2	4	6
Chile	2	2	4
Cuba	4	3	7
Dominican Republic	2	2	4
Ecuador	1	1	2
El Salvador	1	1	2
Guatemala	4	4	8
Guyana	1	1	2
Jamaica	2	2	4
Mexico	4	4	8
Peru	4	4	8
Suriname	1	1	2
Trinidad and Tobago	1		1
United States	4	4	8
Venezuela	1	1	2
Total: 18 NOC's	42	42	84

== Qualification standings ==
Rank	Quota	NOC	Ranking points
–	6	Canada	Host nation
1	8	United States	179278
2	8	Brazil	113671
3	8	Peru	102402
4	8	Guatemala	83375
5	8	Mexico	79475
6	4	Dominican Republic	57525
7	7	Cuba	39240
8	6	Argentina	36916
9	4	Jamaica	22100
10	4	Chile	16960
-	0	Puerto Rico	10940
11	1	Trinidad and Tobago	10870
12	2	Ecuador	10510
13	2	Suriname	10510
-	0	Colombia	6710
14	2	Venezuela	5990
-	~~2~~	~~Costa Rica~~	3760
15	2	El Salvador	1980
16	2	Barbados	1650
17	2	Guyana	0
Total	86		

- Puerto Rico declined all four quotas it had earned (two in each gender), while Colombia also declined all two quotas it had earned (one quota in each gender). The Dominican Republic and Costa Rica declined one quota per gender.
- Guatemala, Argentina and Mexico each received one quota each additional per gender
- Cuba receives an additional male quota, while Trinidad and Tobago receives an additional female quota.
- Guyana received one quota per gender, after requesting quotas to the Pan American Badminton Federation as an unranked nation.
- Trinidad and Tobago later rejected both female quotas, and these two slots were not redistributed.
- Canada declined two men's quotas, no athletes replaced them.
- Costa Rica did not enter any athletes, and their quotas were not redistributed.
