= Weightlifting at the 2015 Pan American Games – Qualification =

== Qualification system ==
A total of 125 weightlifters (69 male and 56 women) will qualify to compete at the games. Qualification was done at the 2013 and 2014 Pan American Championships, where nations had points assigned per athlete's finishing position. The totals of both Championships were added and quotas were then awarded to the top 20 men's teams and 18 women's teams. A further two wildcards (one for each gender) was awarded.

== Qualification timeline ==
Event	Date	Venue
2013 Pan American Weightlifting Championships	June 22–30, 2013	Isla Margarita, Venezuela
2014 Pan American Weightlifting Championships	May 26 – June 2, 2014	Santo Domingo, Dominican Republic

== Qualification summary ==
NOC	Men	Women	Total athletes
Argentina	1	1	2
Aruba	1		1
Barbados	1		1
Bolivia	1		1
Brazil	4	4	8
Canada	7	6	13
Chile	2	3	5
Colombia	7	6	13
Costa Rica	1	1	2
Cuba	7	1	8
Dominican Republic	5	6	11
Ecuador	5	4	9
El Salvador	1	1	2
Guatemala	2	2	4
Haiti	1	1	2
Honduras	1		1
Mexico	5	5	10
Nicaragua	1	1	2
Panama	1	1	2
Peru	2	2	4
Puerto Rico	2	2	4
United States	4	3	7
Uruguay	1		1
Venezuela	7	6	13
Total: 24 NOCs	69	56	125

== Men ==
The following is the list of nations winning quotas for men's events: Aruba and Barbados was later awarded a wildcard spot. Aruba declined this quota, and the spot was reallocated to Bolivia.

- Host nation: 7 Athletes
- Teams 1st–3rd: 7 Athletes
- Teams 4th–6th: 5 Athletes
- Teams 7th–8th: 4 Athletes
- Teams 9th–12th: 2 Athletes
- Teams 13th–20th: 1 Athlete

Rank	Quota	NOC	Year		Total
Rank	Quota	NOC	2013	2014	Total
–	7	Canada	Host nation		
1	7	Cuba	198/8	204/8	402
2	7	Colombia	170/7	200/8	370
3	7	Venezuela	173/8	165/8	338
4	5	Ecuador	182/8	133/8	315
5	5	Dominican Republic	155/8	152/8	307
6	5	Mexico	142/8	156/8	298
7	4	United States	126/8	159/8	285
8	4	Brazil	141/8	133/8	274
9	2	Peru	132/8	124/8	256
10	2	Chile	109/8	129/8	238
11	2	Guatemala	100/8	110/8	210
12	2	Puerto Rico	61/6	102/7	163
13	1	Argentina	119/8	44/3	143
14	1	Panama	74/5	65/5	139
15	1	Honduras	51/4	77/7	128
16	1	Nicaragua	72/6	41/3	113
17	1	El Salvador	53/3	41/2	94
18	1	Uruguay	46/4	48/6	94
19	1	Costa Rica	13/1	72/8	85
20	1	Haiti	29/2	39/3	68
21	–	Aruba	10/1	17/1	27
22	1	Barbados	0/1	18/1	18
–	1	Bolivia	0/0	0/0	0

== Women ==
The following is the list of nations winning quotas for women's events: Haiti was later awarded a wildcard spot.

- Host nation: 6 Athletes
- Teams 1st–3rd: 6 Athletes
- Teams 4th–6th: 4 Athletes
- Teams 7th–8th: 3 Athletes
- Teams 9th–11th: 2 Athletes
- Teams 12th–18th: 1 Athlete

Rank	Quota	NOC	Year		Total
Rank	Quota	NOC	2013	2014	Total
–	6	Canada	Host nation		
1	6	Colombia	172/7	174/7	346
2	6	Dominican Republic	170/7	201/7	315
3	6	Venezuela	135/7	166/7	301
4	4	Ecuador	157/7	144/7	301
5	4	Mexico	173/7	142/6	290
6	4	Brazil	144/7	138/7	282
7	3	United States	124/7	150/7	274
8	3	Chile	113/7	120/7	233
9	2	Peru	102/7	98/7	200
10	2	Guatemala	88/6	106/7	194
11	2	Puerto Rico	69/6	113/7	182
12	1	El Salvador	109/7	59/4	168
13	1	Nicaragua	70/5	97/7	167
14	1	Cuba	68/5	58/3	126
15	1	Argentina	102/7	20/1	122
16	1	Costa Rica	15/1	84/7	99
17	1	Aruba	13/1	16/1	29
18	1	Panama	0/1	17/1	17
19	1	Haiti	–	15/1	15
20		Honduras	–	12/1	12
20		Barbados	–	13/1	13
21		Uruguay	11/1	0/1	11
