= Tennis at the 2015 Pan American Games – Women's doubles =

Tennis – Women's doubles at the 2015 Pan American Games
- Venue: Canadian Tennis Centre
- Dates: July 12–16, 2015
- Competitors: 14 competitors from 7 nations

Medalists
Gold medal	Gabriela Dabrowski; Carol Zhao	Canada
Silver medal	Victoria Rodríguez; Marcela Zacarías	Mexico
Bronze medal	María Irigoyen; Paula Ormaechea	Argentina

Women's doubles
- Tennis at the 2015 Pan American Games

Events
Singles	men	women
Doubles	men	women	mixed
Qualification
← 2011 ·	Pan American Games	· 2019 →

The women's doubles tennis event of the 2015 Pan American Games was held from July 12–16 at the Canadian Tennis Centre in Toronto, Canada.

== Seeds ==
1. Beatriz Haddad Maia (BRA) / Paula Cristina Gonçalves (BRA) (semifinals)
2. María Irigoyen (ARG) / Paula Ormaechea (ARG) (semifinals, bronze medalists)

== Draw ==
=== Key ===
- Q = Qualifier
- WC = Wild card
- LL = Lucky loser
- Alt = Alternate
- ITF = ITF entry
- PR = Protected ranking
- SR = Special ranking
- SE = Special exempt
- JE = Junior exempt
- JR = Junior Accelerator Programme entrant
- CO = College Accelerator Programme entrant
- NG = Next Gen Accelerator Program entrant
- w/o = Walkover
- r = Retired
- d = Defaulted

=== Finals ===
Semifinals
1	Beatriz Haddad Maia (BRA); Paula Cristina Gonçalves (BRA)	6	6	[8]
Victoria Rodríguez (MEX); Marcela Zacarías (MEX)	7	4	[10]
Gabriela Dabrowski (CAN); Carol Zhao (CAN)	6	6
2	María Irigoyen (ARG); Paula Ormaechea (ARG)	2	1

Final (gold-medal match)
Victoria Rodríguez (MEX); Marcela Zacarías (MEX)	1	6	[5]
Gabriela Dabrowski (CAN); Carol Zhao (CAN)	6	4	[10]
Bronze-medal match
1	Beatriz Haddad Maia (BRA); Paula Cristina Gonçalves (BRA)
2	María Irigoyen (ARG); Paula Ormaechea (ARG)	w/o

=== Top half ===
Quarterfinals			Semifinals
			1	B Haddad Maia (BRA); PC Gonçalves (BRA)	6	6	[8]
F Brito (CHI); D Seguel (CHI)	4	3		V Rodríguez (MEX); M Zacarías (MEX)	7	4	[10]
V Rodríguez (MEX); M Zacarías (MEX)	6	6

=== Bottom half ===
Quarterfinals
C Giangreco (PAR); M González (PAR)	2	3
G Dabrowski (CAN); C Zhao (CAN)	6	6
L Chirico (USA); L Davis (USA)	5	4
2	M Irigoyen (ARG); P Ormaechea (ARG)	7	6

Semifinals
G Dabrowski (CAN); C Zhao (CAN)	6	6
2	M Irigoyen (ARG); P Ormaechea (ARG)	2	1
