= 2015 Pan American Games Parade of Nations =

The 2015 Pan American Games Parade of Nations occurred at the 2015 Pan American Games opening ceremony, held beginning at 18:45 Eastern Daylight Time (UTC−4) on July 10, 2015. 41 athletes bearing the flags of their respective nations led their national delegations as they paraded into Pan Am Ceremonies Venue in the host city of Toronto, Ontario, Canada.

Athletes entered the stadium in an order dictated by tradition. As the host of the first Pan American Games, Argentina entered first. The Canadian delegation entered last, representing the host nation. The remaining countries entered in Spanish alphabetical order as per Pan American Sports Organization protocol.

As each nation entered the music reflected the traditional instruments and melodic styles of each of the 41 countries and territories. Silhouettes portraying the five disciplines of the pentathlon appear in the distance to honour their entrance (javelin, long jump, wrestling, discus and running), where the first multi sport games and the Pan American Games grew from their foundations. Each nation was preceded by a placard bearer holding a high-tech LED Device which flashed the name of each participating team in the three languages (English, French and Spanish), the former two also being the official languages of Canada.

== List ==
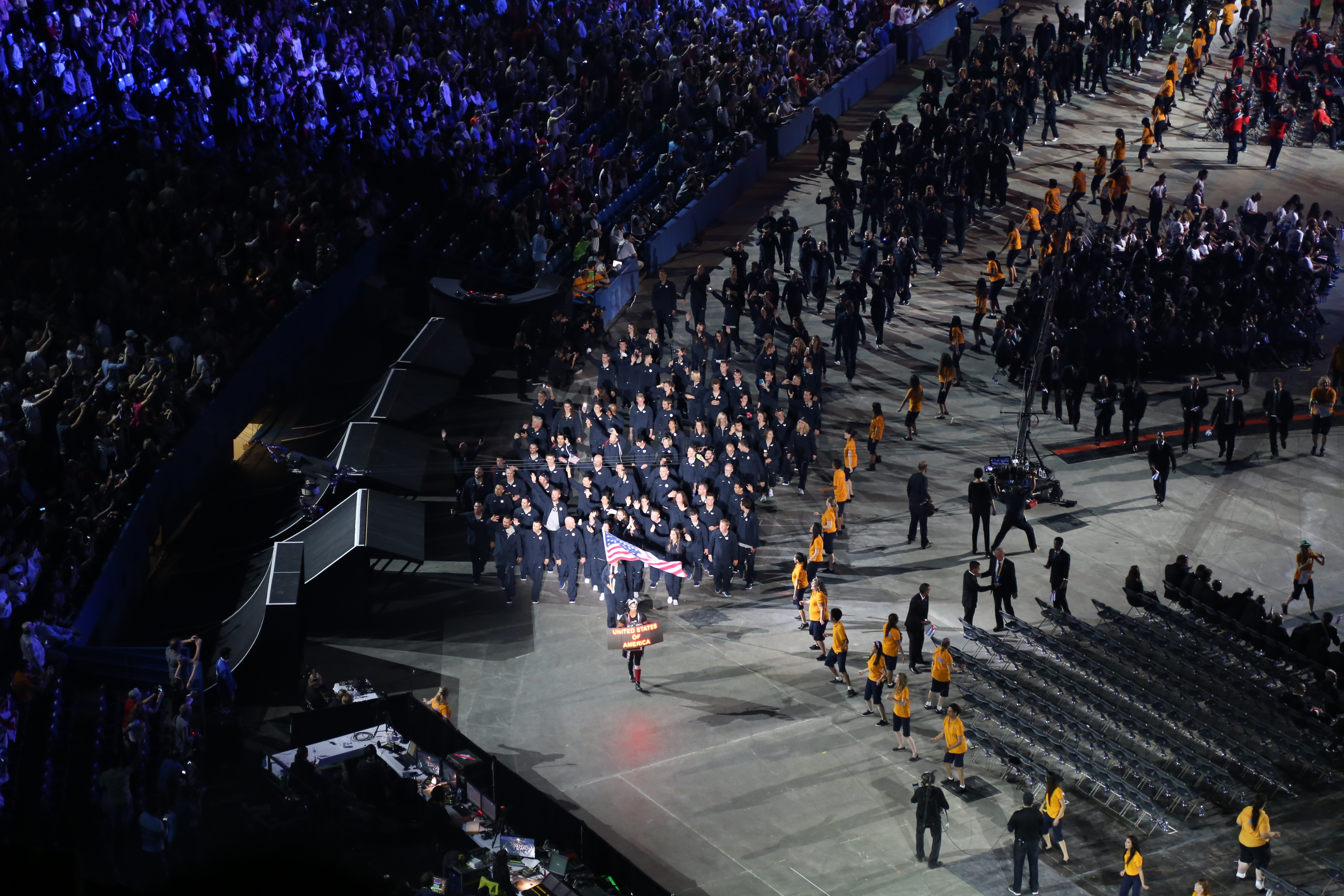
The US contingent for the 2015 Pan Am games shown entering the stadium during the opening ceremonies

| Order | Nation | Spanish | French | Flag bearer | Sport |
|---|---|---|---|---|---|
| 1 | Argentina | Argentina | Argentine | Walter Pérez | Cycling |
| 2 | Antigua and Barbuda | Antigua y Barbuda | Antigue et Barbude | Daniel Bailey | Athletics |
| 3 | Aruba | Aruba | Aruba | Philipine van Aanholt | Sailing |
| 4 | Bahamas | Bahamas | Bahamas | Arianna Vanderpool-Wallace | Swimming |
| 5 | Barbados | Barbados | Barbade | Darian King | Tennis |
| 6 | Belize | Belice | Belize | Amed Figueroa | Triathlon |
| 7 | Bermuda | Bermuda | Bermudes | Julian Fletcher | Swimming |
| 8 | Bolivia | Bolivia | Bolivie | Rudolf Knijnenburg | Shooting |
| 9 | Brazil | Brasil | Brésil | Thiago Pereira | Swimming |
| 10 | Chile | Chile | Chili | Isidora Jiménez | Athletics |
| 11 | Colombia | Colombia | Colombie | Miguel Ángel Rodríguez | Squash |
| 12 | Costa Rica | Costa Rica | Costa Rica | Roberto Sawyers | Athletics |
| 13 | Cuba | Cuba | Cuba | Mijaín López | Wrestling |
| 14 | Dominica | Dominica | Dominique | David Registe | Athletics |
| 15 | Ecuador | Ecuador | Equateur | Jacqueline Factos | Karate |
| 16 | El Salvador | El Salvador | Salvador | Marcelo Acosta | Swimming |
| 17 | United States | Estados Unidos de América | États-Unis D'Amerique | Kim Rhode | Shooting |
| 18 | Grenada | Granada | Grenade | Oreoluwa Cherebin | Swimming |
| 19 | Guatemala | Guatemala | Guatemala | Mirna Ortiz | Athletics |
| 20 | Guyana | Guyana | Guyana | Onika George | Swimming |
| 21 | Haiti | Haití | Haïti | Edouard Joseph | Weightlifting |
| 22 | Honduras | Honduras | Honduras | Kevin Mejía | Wrestling |
| 23 | Cayman Islands | Islas Caimán | Îles Caïmans | Brett Fraser | Swimming |
| 24 | British Virgin Islands | Islas Vírgenes Británicas | Îles Vierges britanniques | Joseph Chapman | Squash |
| 25 | Virgin Islands | Islas Vírgenes de los Estados Unidos | Îles Vierges des États-Unis | Cy Thompson | Sailing |
| 26 | Jamaica | Jamaica | Jamaïque | Gareth Henry | Badminton |
| 27 | Mexico | México | Mexique | Paola Longoria | Racquetball |
| 28 | Nicaragua | Nicaragua | Nicaragua | Darrel Campbell Lewis | Baseball |
| 29 | Panama | Panamá | Panama | Édgar Crespo | Swimming |
| 30 | Paraguay | Paraguay | Paraguay | Benjamin Hockin | Swimming |
| 31 | Peru | Perú | Perou | Diego Elías | Squash |
| 32 | Puerto Rico | Puerto Rico | Porto Rico | Luis Rivera | Gymnastics |
| 33 | Dominican Republic | República Dominicana | République dominicaine | Eduardo Lorenzo | Shooting |
| 34 | Saint Kitts and Nevis | San Cristóbal y Nieves | Saint-Christophe-et-Niévès | Antoine Adams | Athletics |
| 35 | Saint Vincent and the Grenadines | San Vicente y las Granadinas | Saint-Vincent-et-les-Grenadines | Kineke Alexander | Athletics |
| 36 | Saint Lucia | Santa Lucía | Sainte-Lucie | Jordan Augier | Swimming |
| 37 | Suriname | Surinam | Suriname | Chinyere Pigot | Swimming |
| 38 | Trinidad and Tobago | Trinidad y Tobago | Trinité-et-Tobago | Roger Daniel | Shooting |
| 39 | Uruguay | Uruguay | Uruguay | Déborah Rodríguez | Athletics |
| 40 | Venezuela | Venezuela | Venezuela | Marvin Blanco | Athletics |
| 41 | Canada | Canadá | Canada | Mark Oldershaw | Canoeing |
