= Tennis at the 2015 Pan American Games – Mixed doubles =

Tennis – Mixed doubles at the 2015 Pan American Games
- Venue: Canadian Tennis Centre
- Dates: July 12–16, 2015
- Competitors: 26 competitors from 13 nations
- Gold medal match score: 6–3, 6–0

Medalists
Gold medal	Guido Andreozzi; María Irigoyen	Argentina
Silver medal	Philip Bester; Gabriela Dabrowski	Canada
Bronze medal	Verónica Cepede Royg; Diego Galeano	Paraguay

Mixed doubles
- Tennis at the 2015 Pan American Games

Events
Singles	men	women
Doubles	men	women	mixed
Qualification
← 2011 ·	Pan American Games	· 2019 →

The mixed doubles tennis event of the 2015 Pan American Games was held from July 12–16 at the Canadian Tennis Centre in Toronto, Canada.

== Seeds ==
1. Guido Andreozzi (ARG) / María Irigoyen (ARG) (champions, gold medalists)
2. Mariana Duque Mariño (COL) / Eduardo Struvay (COL) (semifinals)
3. Philip Bester (CAN) / Gabriela Dabrowski (CAN) (final, silver medalists)
4. Andrea Gámiz (VEN) / Luis David Martínez (VEN) (first round)

== Draw ==
=== Key ===
- Q = Qualifier
- WC = Wild card
- LL = Lucky loser
- Alt = Alternate
- ITF = ITF entry
- PR = Protected ranking
- SR = Special ranking
- SE = Special exempt
- JE = Junior exempt
- JR = Junior Accelerator Programme entrant
- CO = College Accelerator Programme entrant
- NG = Next Gen Accelerator Program entrant
- w/o = Walkover
- r = Retired
- d = Defaulted

=== Finals ===
Semifinals
1	Guido Andreozzi (ARG); María Irigoyen (ARG)	1	6	[10]
Verónica Cepede Royg (PAR); Diego Galeano (PAR)	6	3	[7]
3	Philip Bester (CAN); Gabriela Dabrowski (CAN)	4	6	[10]
2	Mariana Duque Mariño (COL); Eduardo Struvay (COL)	6	0	[3]

Final (gold-medal match)
1	Guido Andreozzi (ARG); María Irigoyen (ARG)	6	6
3	Philip Bester (CAN); Gabriela Dabrowski (CAN)	3	0
Bronze-medal match
Verónica Cepede Royg (PAR); Diego Galeano (PAR)	6	7
2	Mariana Duque Mariño (COL); Eduardo Struvay (COL)	3	5

=== Top half ===
First round
MF Álvarez Terán (BOL); H Dellien (BOL)	4	6	[11]
C Díaz Figueroa (GUA); A Weedon (GUA)	6	3	[9]
V Cepede Royg (PAR); D Galeano (PAR)	6	5	[10]
R Cid (DOM); F Segarelli (DOM)	4	7	[5]
G Austin (USA); S Vickery (USA)	6	6
4	A Gámiz (VEN); LD Martínez (VEN)	4	3

Quarterfinals
1	G Andreozzi (ARG); M Irigoyen (ARG)	6	6
MF Álvarez Terán (BOL); H Dellien (BOL)	0	4
V Cepede Royg (PAR); D Galeano (PAR)	6	6
G Austin (USA); S Vickery (USA)	0	3

Semifinals
1	G Andreozzi (ARG); M Irigoyen (ARG)	1	6	[10]
V Cepede Royg (PAR); D Galeano (PAR)	6	3	[7]

=== Bottom half ===
First round				Quarterfinals				Semifinals
				3	P Bester (CAN); G Dabrowski (CAN)	6	6
G Lapentti (ECU); C Römer (ECU)	6	5	[7]		A Koch (CHI); H Podlipnik (CHI)	2	2
A Koch (CHI); H Podlipnik (CHI)	2	7	[10]					3	P Bester (CAN); G Dabrowski (CAN)	4	6	[10]
AS Sánchez (MEX); M Sánchez (MEX)	4	6	[6]					2	M Duque Mariño (COL); E Struvay (COL)	6	0	[3]
J Menezes (BRA); G Cé (BRA)	6	2	[10]		J Menezes (BRA); G Cé (BRA)	2	2
				2	M Duque Mariño (COL); E Struvay (COL)	6	6
