= Tennis at the 2015 Pan American Games – Men's doubles =

Tennis – Men's doubles at the 2015 Pan American Games
- Venue: Canadian Tennis Centre
- Dates: July 11–15, 2015
- Competitors: 30 competitors from 15 nations
- Gold medal match score: 6–4, 7–6^{(7-5)}

Medalists
Gold medal	Nicolás Jarry; Hans Podlipnik	Chile
Silver medal	Guido Andreozzi; Facundo Bagnis	Argentina
Bronze medal	Gonzalo Escobar; Emilio Gómez	Ecuador

Men's doubles
- Tennis at the 2015 Pan American Games

Events
Singles	men	women
Doubles	men	women	mixed
Qualification
- Pan American Games

The men's doubles tennis event of the 2015 Pan American Games was held from July 11–15 at the Canadian Tennis Centre in Toronto, Canada.

== Seeds ==
1. Guido Andreozzi (ARG) / Facundo Bagnis (ARG) (final, silver medalists)
2. Nicolás Jarry (CHI) / Hans Podlipnik (CHI) (champions, gold medalists)
3. Nicolás Barrientos (COL) / Carlos Salamanca (COL) (first round)
4. Hans Hach (MEX) / Luis Patiño (MEX) (quarterfinals)

== Draw ==
Key

- Q = Qualifier
- WC = Wild card
- LL = Lucky loser
- Alt = Alternate
- ITF = ITF entry
- PR = Protected ranking
- SR = Special ranking
- SE = Special exempt
- JE = Junior exempt
- JR = Junior Accelerator Programme entrant
- CO = College Accelerator Programme entrant
- NG = Next Gen Accelerator Program entrant
- w/o = Walkover
- r = Retired
- d = Defaulted

=== Finals ===
Semifinals
1	Guido Andreozzi (ARG); Facundo Bagnis (ARG)	6	4	[10]
Darian King (BAR); Haydn Lewis (BAR)	3	6	[8]
Gonzalo Escobar (ECU); Emilio Gómez (ECU)	4	4
2	Nicolás Jarry (CHI); Hans Podlipnik (CHI)	6	6

Final (gold-medal match)
1	Guido Andreozzi (ARG); Facundo Bagnis (ARG)	4	6^{5}
2	Nicolás Jarry (CHI); Hans Podlipnik (CHI)	6	7^{7}
Bronze-medal match
Darian King (BAR); Haydn Lewis (BAR)	3	0
Gonzalo Escobar (ECU); Emilio Gómez (ECU)	6	6

=== Top half ===
First round
R Arús (URU); A Behar (URU)	6	6
W Dorantes (CUB); OA Hernández (CUB)	3	2
LD Martínez (VEN); R Rodríguez (VEN)	6^{2}	1
D King (BAR); H Lewis (BAR)	7^{7}	6
O Luz (BRA); M Zormann (BRA)	6	3	[12]
4	H Hach (MEX); L Patiño (MEX)	1	6	[14]

Quarterfinals
1	G Andreozzi (ARG); F Bagnis (ARG)	6	6
R Arús (URU); A Behar (URU)	2	1
D King (BAR); H Lewis (BAR)	7	7
4	H Hach (MEX); L Patiño (MEX)	5	5

Semifinals
1	G Andreozzi (ARG); F Bagnis (ARG)	6	4	[10]
D King (BAR); H Lewis (BAR)	3	6	[8]

=== Bottom half ===
First round
3	N Barrientos (COL); C Salamanca (COL)	4	1
G Escobar (ECU); E Gómez (ECU)	6	6
R Banzer (BOL); F Zeballos (BOL)	6	7
A Obando (HON); K Turcios (HON)	1	5
C Díaz Figueroa (GUA); W González (GUA)	3	2
J-Y Aubone (USA); D Novikov (USA)	6	6
P Bester (CAN); B Schnur (CAN)	4	4
2	N Jarry (CHI); H Podlipnik (CHI)	6	6

Quarterfinals
G Escobar (ECU); E Gómez (ECU)	7^{7}	6
R Banzer (BOL); F Zeballos (BOL)	6^{3}	4
J-Y Aubone (USA); D Novikov (USA)	7	3	[3]
2	N Jarry (CHI); H Podlipnik (CHI)	5	6	[10]

Semifinals
G Escobar (ECU); E Gómez (ECU)	4	4
2	N Jarry (CHI); H Podlipnik (CHI)	6	6
