= Tennis at the 2015 Pan American Games – Women's singles =

Tennis – Women's singles at the 2015 Pan American Games
- Venue: Canadian Tennis Centre
- Dates: July 11–16, 2015
- Competitors: 30 from 15 nations
- Gold medal match score: 6–4, 6–4

Medalists
| Gold medal | Mariana Duque Mariño | Colombia |
| Silver medal | Victoria Rodríguez | Mexico |
| Bronze medal | Monica Puig | Puerto Rico |

Women's singles
- Tennis at the 2015 Pan American Games

Events
| Singles | men | women |
| Doubles | men | women | mixed |
Qualification
| ← 2011 · | Pan American Games | · 2019 → |

The women's singles tennis event of the 2015 Pan American Games was held from July 11–16 at the Canadian Tennis Centre in Toronto, Canada.

== Seeds ==
1. Lauren Davis (USA) (semifinals)
2. Monica Puig (PUR) (semifinals, bronze medalist)
3. Mariana Duque Mariño (COL) (champion, gold medalist)
4. Sachia Vickery (USA) (first round)
5. Louisa Chirico (USA) (second round)
6. Beatriz Haddad Maia (BRA) (first round)
7. Verónica Cepede Royg (PAR) (quarterfinals)
8. María Irigoyen (ARG) (first round)

== Draw ==
=== Key ===
- Q = Qualifier
- WC = Wild card
- LL = Lucky loser
- Alt = Alternate
- ITF = ITF entry
- PR = Protected ranking
- SR = Special ranking
- SE = Special exempt
- JE = Junior exempt
- JR = Junior Accelerator Programme entrant
- CO = College Accelerator Programme entrant
- NG = Next Gen Accelerator Program entrant
- w/o = Walkover
- r = Retired
- d = Defaulted

=== Finals ===
Semifinals
1 | Lauren Davis (USA) | 1 | 6 | 3
3 | Mariana Duque Mariño (COL) | 6 | 2 | 6
Victoria Rodríguez (MEX) | 2 | 6 | 6
2 | Monica Puig (PUR) | 6 | 3 | 2

Final (gold-medal match)
3 | Mariana Duque Mariño (COL) | 6 | 6
Victoria Rodríguez (MEX) | 4 | 4
Bronze-medal match
1 | Lauren Davis (USA) | 6 | 3 | 3
2 | Monica Puig (PUR) | 2 | 6 | 6

=== Top half ===
First round
C Römer (ECU) | 7 | 4 | 4
B Botto (PER) | 5 | 6 | 6
PC Gonçalves (BRA) | 2 | 6 | 7^{7}
D Seguel (CHI) | 6 | 3 | 6^{4}
P Ormaechea (ARG) | 6^{7} | 4
7 | V Cepede Royg (PAR) | 7^{9} | 6
3 | M Duque Mariño (COL) | 6 | 6
M Gutiérrez (VEN) | 1 | 2
M Zacarías (MEX) | 6 | 6
A Koch (CHI) | 4 | 0
G Dabrowski (CAN) | 6 | 4 | 6
G Cé (BRA) | 3 | 6 | 3
A Weedon (GUA) | 6^{4} | 2
5 | L Chirico (USA) | 7^{7} | 6

Second round
1 | L Davis (USA) | 6 | 6
B Botto (PER) | 3 | 1
PC Gonçalves (BRA) | 4 | 1
7 | V Cepede Royg (PAR) | 6 | 6
3 | M Duque Mariño (COL) | 7 | 7^{7}
M Zacarías (MEX) | 5 | 6^{2}
G Dabrowski (CAN) | 6 | 4 | 6
5 | L Chirico (USA) | 3 | 6 | 4

Quarterfinals
1 | L Davis (USA) | 6 | 3 | 6
7 | V Cepede Royg (PAR) | 2 | 6 | 3
3 | M Duque Mariño (COL) | 6 | 6
G Dabrowski (CAN) | 2 | 1

Semifinals
1 | L Davis (USA) | 1 | 6 | 3
3 | M Duque Mariño (COL) | 6 | 2 | 6

=== Bottom half ===
First round
8 | M Irigoyen (ARG) | 6 | 5 | 4
C Zhao (CAN) | 1 | 7 | 6
MF Herazo (COL) | 3 | 7^{7} | 3
M González (PAR) | 6 | 6^{5} | 6
F Segarelli (DOM) | 6 | 2 | 6^{4}
WC | MF Álvarez Terán (BOL) | 3 | 6 | 7^{7}
V Rodríguez (MEX) | 6 | 6
4 | S Vickery (USA) | 3 | 3
6 | B Haddad Maia (BRA) | 1 | 0
F Brito (CHI) | 6 | 6
A Gámiz (VEN) | 6 | 7
C Giangreco (PAR) | 3 | 5
F Abanda (CAN) | 6 | 4 | 7
AS Sánchez (MEX) | 1 | 6 | 5

Second round
C Zhao (CAN) | 6 | 4 | 6
M González (PAR) | 4 | 6 | 3
WC | MF Álvarez Terán (BOL) | 3 | 2
V Rodríguez (MEX) | 6 | 6
F Brito (CHI) | 4 | 5
A Gámiz (VEN) | 6 | 7
F Abanda (CAN) | 0 | 3
2 | M Puig (PUR) | 6 | 6

Quarterfinals
C Zhao (CAN) | 0 | 4
V Rodríguez (MEX) | 6 | 6
A Gámiz (VEN) | 0 | 1
2 | M Puig (PUR) | 6 | 6

Semifinals
V Rodríguez (MEX) | 2 | 6 | 6
2 | M Puig (PUR) | 6 | 3 | 2
