= Tennis at the 2015 Pan American Games =

- Tennis pictogram for the games
- Venue: Canadian Tennis Centre
- Dates: July 10–16
- No. of events: 5 (2 men, 2 women, 1 mixed)
- Competitors: 75 from 23 nations

Tennis competitions at the 2015 Pan American Games in Toronto were held from July 10 to 16 at the Rexall Centre, which was known as the Canadian Tennis Centre for the duration of the games due to naming rights. A total of five events were contested (two each for men and women, and a mixed doubles event). Argentina topped the medal table, with gold medals in the men's singles and mixed doubles, while hosts Canada also achieved gold in the women's doubles event.

The second round of the 2015 Davis Cup was moved ahead one week to not conflict with the tennis competitions. Tennis competitions also began before the opening ceremony, to allow athletes to compete in both events.

== Competition schedule ==
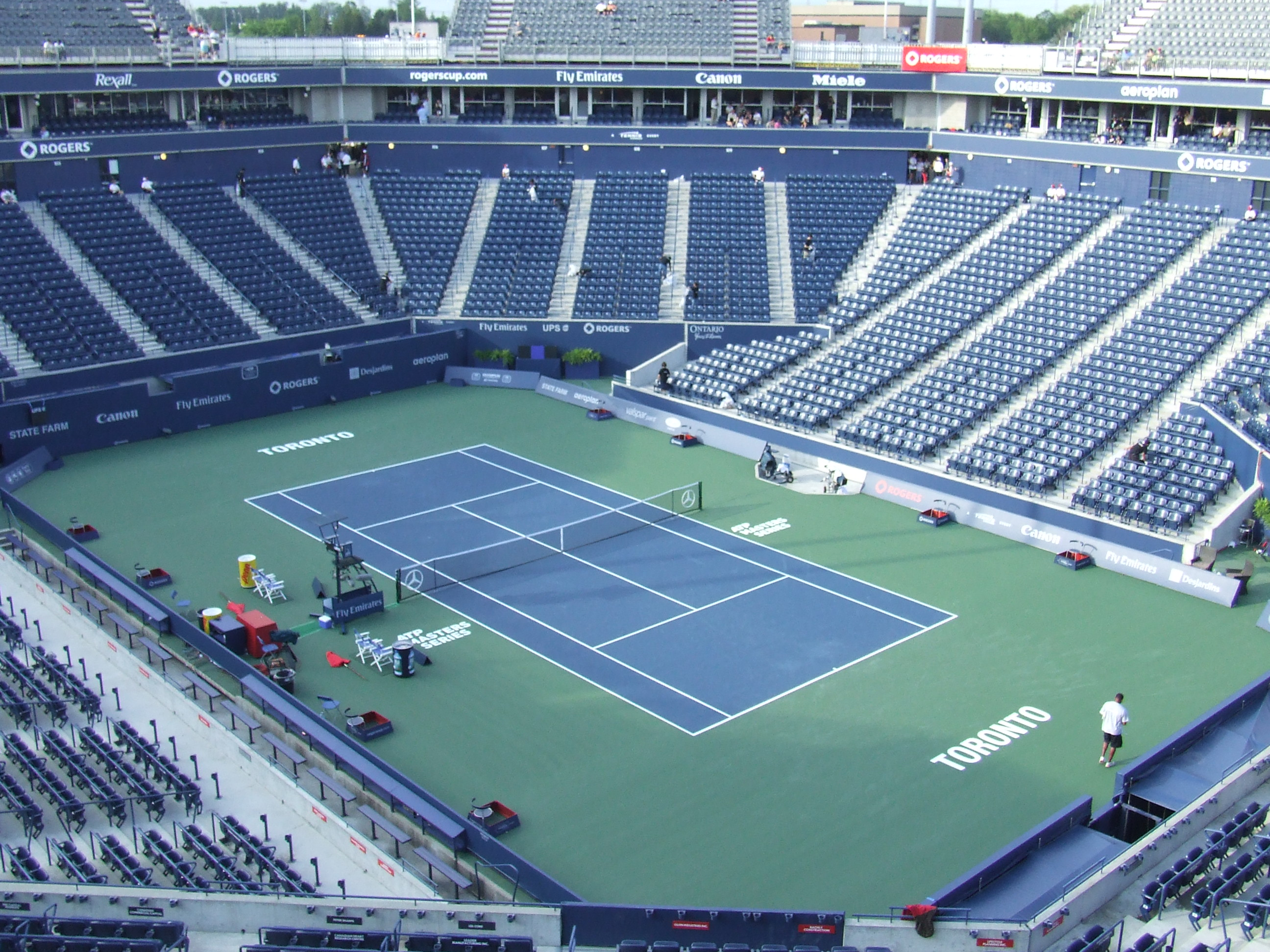
The Rexall Centre (Canadian Tennis Centre), was the venue for the tennis competitions

The following is the competition schedule for the tennis competitions:

E	Eliminations	½	Semifinals	F	Final

Event↓/Date →	Fri 10	Sat 11	Sun 12	Mon 13	Tue 14	Wed 15	Thu 16
Men's singles	E	E	E	E	½	F	
Men's doubles		E	E	E	½	F	
Women's singles		E	E	E	E	½	F
Women's doubles			E	E	E	½	F
Mixed doubles			E	E	½	F	

== Medal table ==
The following is the medal standings as of 16 June 2015.

* Host nation (Canada)

Rank	Nation	Gold	Silver	Bronze	Total
1	Argentina	2	1	1	4
2	Canada*	1	1	0	2
2	Colombia	1	1	0	2
4	Chile	1	0	0	1
5	Mexico	0	2	0	2
6	Ecuador	0	0	1	1
6	Paraguay	0	0	1	1
6	Puerto Rico	0	0	1	1
6	United States	0	0	1	1
Totals (9 entries)		5	5	5	15

== Medalists ==
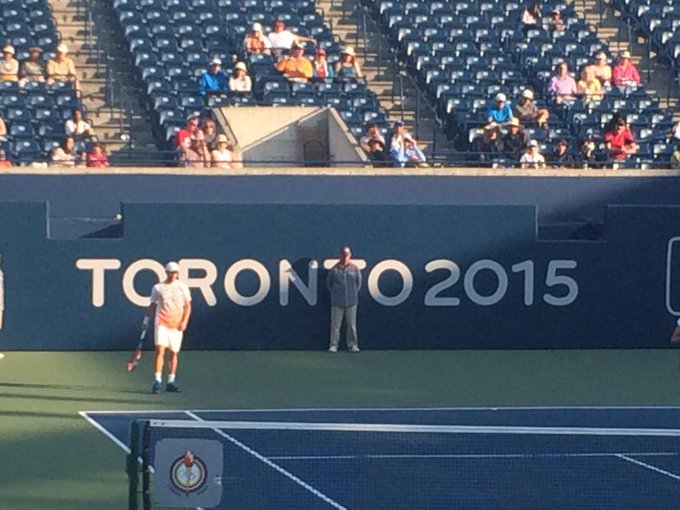
During the competition

Event	Gold	Silver	Bronze
Men's singles	Facundo Bagnis; Argentina	Nicolás Barrientos; Colombia	Dennis Novikov; United States
Men's doubles	Chile; Nicolás Jarry; Hans Podlipnik	Argentina; Guido Andreozzi; Facundo Bagnis	Ecuador; Gonzalo Escobar; Emilio Gómez
Women's singles	Mariana Duque Mariño; Colombia	Victoria Rodríguez; Mexico	Monica Puig; Puerto Rico
Women's doubles	Canada; Gabriela Dabrowski; Carol Zhao	Mexico; Victoria Rodríguez; Marcela Zacarías	Argentina; María Irigoyen; Paula Ormaechea
Mixed doubles	Argentina; Guido Andreozzi; María Irigoyen	Canada; Philip Bester; Gabriela Dabrowski	Paraguay; Verónica Cepede Royg; Diego Galeano

== Participating nations ==
A total of 23 countries had qualified athletes.

- Argentina (4)
- Bahamas (1)
- Barbados (3)
- Bolivia (4)
- Brazil (6)
- Canada (6)
- Chile (5)
- Colombia (5)
- Costa Rica (1)
- Cuba (2)
- Dominican Republic (2)
- Ecuador (4)
- El Salvador (1)
- Grenada (1)
- Guatemala (3)
- Honduras (2)
- Mexico (6)
- Paraguay (4)
- Peru (1)
- Puerto Rico (1)
- United States (6)
- Uruguay (3)
- Venezuela (4)

== Qualification ==
A total of 80 tennis players qualified to compete at the Games (48 men and 32 women). Each country was allowed to enter a maximum of three male and three female athletes (with one pair maximum in each of the doubles events).
