= Darryl Conrad =

Canadian weightlifter

Personal information
- Full name: Darryl Bernard Conrad
- Born: 4 November 1984 (age 41)
- Weight: 84.44 kg (186.2 lb)

Sport
- Country: Canada
- Sport: Weightlifting
- Weight class: 77 kg / 85 kg
- Team: National team
- Updated on 19 October 2016

Darryl Bernard Conrad (born 4 November 1984) is a Canadian male weightlifter, competing in the 77–85 kg category and representing Canada at international competitions. He participated at the 2014 Commonwealth Games in the 85 kg event, and at the 2015 Pan American Games in the 77 kg event.

== Major competitions ==
Year	Venue	Weight	Snatch (kg)				Clean & jerk (kg)				Total	Rank
Year	Venue	Weight	1	2	3	Rank	1	2	3	Rank	Total	Rank
Commonwealth Games
2014	Glasgow, Scotland	85 kg	128	133	~~138~~	—N/a	160	165	~~169~~	—N/a	298	8
Pan American Games
2015	Toronto, Canada	77 kg	124	~~128~~	128	—N/a	~~156~~	~~157~~	~~157~~	—N/a	0	---
