= Brien Best =

Barbadian weightlifter (born 1996)

Personal information
- Full name: Brien Anderson Best
- Born: 3 April 1996 (age 30)
- Weight: 75.14 kg (165.7 lb)

Sport
- Country: Barbados
- Sport: Weightlifting
- Weight class: 77 kg
- Team: National team
- Updated on 19 October 2016

Brien Anderson Best (born 3 April 1996) is a Barbadian male weightlifter, competing in the 77 kg category and representing Barbados at international competitions. He participated at the 2014 Commonwealth Games in the 77 kg event.

== Major competitions ==
Year	Venue	Weight	Snatch (kg)				Clean & Jerk (kg)				Total	Rank
Year	Venue	Weight	1	2	3	Rank	1	2	3	Rank	Total	Rank
Commonwealth Games
2014	Glasgow, Scotland	77 kg	105	110	115	—N/a	135	142	~~148~~	—N/a	257	16
Pan American Games
2015	Toronto, Canada	77 kg	~~115~~	~~115~~	---	—N/a	---	---	---	—N/a	0	---
