= Weightlifting at the 2015 Pan American Games – Men's 77 kg =

Weightlifting – Men's 77 kg at the 2015 Pan American Games
- Venue: Oshawa Sports Centre
- Dates: July 13
- Competitors: 11 from 10 nations

Medalists
| Gold medal | Addriel Garcia Lao | Cuba |
| Silver medal | Junior Sánchez | Venezuela |
| Bronze medal | Jhor Moreno | Colombia |

The men's 77 kg competition of the weightlifting events at the 2015 Pan American Games in Toronto, Canada, was held on July 12 at the Oshawa Sports Centre. The defending champion was Ivan Cambar from Cuba.

Each lifter performed in both the snatch and clean and jerk lifts, with the final score being the sum of the lifter's best result in each. The athlete received three attempts in each of the two lifts; the score for the lift was the heaviest weight successfully lifted.

== Schedule ==
All times are Eastern Daylight Time (UTC-4).

| Date | Time | Round |
|---|---|---|
| July 13, 2015 | 14:00 | Final |

== Results ==
11 athletes from ten countries took part.

| Rank | Name | Country | Group | B.weight (kg) | Snatch (kg) | Clean & Jerk (kg) | Total (kg) |
|---|---|---|---|---|---|---|---|
| 1st place, gold medalist(s) | Addriel Garcia Lao | Cuba | A | 75.61 | 153 | 185 | 338 |
| 2nd place, silver medalist(s) | Junior Sánchez | Venezuela | A | 75.13 | 155 | 182 | 337 |
| 3rd place, bronze medalist(s) | Jhor Moreno | Colombia | A | 76.75 | 146 | 182 | 328 |
| 4 | Travis Cooper | United States | A | 76.85 | 146 | 179 | 325 |
| 5 | Juan Peña | Dominican Republic | A | 76.47 | 144 | 180 | 324 |
| 6 | Domingo Roman | Mexico | A | 75.85 | 145 | 176 | 321 |
| 7 | Ricardo Flores | Ecuador | A | 76.43 | 137 | 180 | 317 |
| 8 | Bástian López | Chile | A | 76.32 | 136 | 176 | 312 |
| 9 | Jérôme Boisclair | Canada | A | 76.57 | 130 | 160 | 290 |
| | Darryl Conrad | Canada | A | 76.39 | 128 | - | |
| | Brien Best | Barbados | A | 75.66 | - | - | DNF |
