= Athletics at the 2015 Pan American Games – Men's 110 metres hurdles =

Men's 110 metres hurdles at the 2015 Pan American Games
- Venue: CIBC Pan Am and Parapan Am Athletics Stadium
- Dates: July 24
- Competitors: 19 from 13 nations
- Winning time: 13.07

Medalists
Gold medal	David Oliver	United States
Silver medal	Mikel Thomas	Trinidad and Tobago
Bronze medal	Shane Brathwaite	Barbados

The men's 110 metres hurdles sprint competition of the athletics events at the 2015 Pan American Games took place on July 24 at the CIBC Pan Am and Parapan Am Athletics Stadium in Toronto, Canada. The defending Pan American Games champion is Dayron Robles of Cuba.

== Records ==
Prior to this competition, the existing world and Pan American Games records were as follows:

World record	Aries Merritt (USA)	12.80	Brussels, Belgium	September 7, 2012
Pan American Games record	Dayron Robles (CUB)	13.10	Guadalajara, Mexico	October 28, 2011

== Qualification ==
Each National Olympic Committee (NOC) was able to enter up to two entrants providing they had met the minimum standard (14.08) in the qualifying period (January 1, 2014 to June 28, 2015).

== Schedule ==
Date	Time	Round
July 24, 2015	10:10	Semifinals
July 24, 2015	13:10	Final

== Results ==
All times shown are in seconds.

KEY:	q	Fastest non-qualifiers	Q	Qualified	NR	National record	PB	Personal best	SB	Seasonal best	DQ	Disqualified

=== Semifinals ===
Wind:

Rank	Heat	Name	Nationality	Time	Wind	Notes
1	3	David Oliver	United States	13.15	-0.1	Q
2	2	Shane Brathwaite	Barbados	13.36	+0.1	Q
3	1	Greggmar Swift	Barbados	13.40	-0.4	Q
3	3	Tyler Mason	Jamaica	13.40	-0.1	Q
5	1	Yordan O'Farrill	Cuba	13.42	-0.4	Q
6	2	Mikel Thomas	Trinidad and Tobago	13.44	+0.1	Q
7	2	Jhoanis Portilla	Cuba	13.53	+0.1	q, SB
8	3	Johnathan Cabral	Canada	13.55	-0.1	q
9	1	Sékou Kaba	Canada	13.57	-0.4	
10	1	Dwight Thomas	Jamaica	13.58	-0.4	
11	2	Ray Stewart	Dominican Republic	13.62	+0.1	
12	3	Eddie Lovett	Virgin Islands	13.65	-0.1	
13	3	Jeffrey Julmis	Haiti	13.72	-0.1	
14	1	Jorge McFarlane	Peru	13.73	-0.4	SB
15	2	Ronald Forbes	Cayman Islands	13.78	+0.1	
16	1	Éder Antônio Souza	Brazil	13.80	-0.4	
17	2	Jonatha Mendes	Brazil	13.81	+0.1	
18	3	Genaro Rodríguez	Mexico	14.15	-0.1	
	3	Javier McFarlane	Peru	DNF	-0.1	

=== Final ===
Wind: +0.8 m/s

Rank	Lane	Name	Nationality	Time	Notes
1st place, gold medalist(s)	3	David Oliver	United States	13.07	PR
2nd place, silver medalist(s)	8	Mikel Thomas	Trinidad and Tobago	13.17	NR
3rd place, bronze medalist(s)	4	Shane Brathwaite	Barbados	13.21	PB
4	6	Greggmar Swift	Barbados	13.28	PB
5	1	Jhoanis Portilla	Cuba	13.30	PB
6	7	Yordan O'Farrill	Cuba	13.36	
7	5	Tyler Mason	Jamaica	13.69	
8	2	Johnathan Cabral	Canada	14.07	
