= Victoria Rodríguez (tennis) =

Mexican tennis player (born 1995)

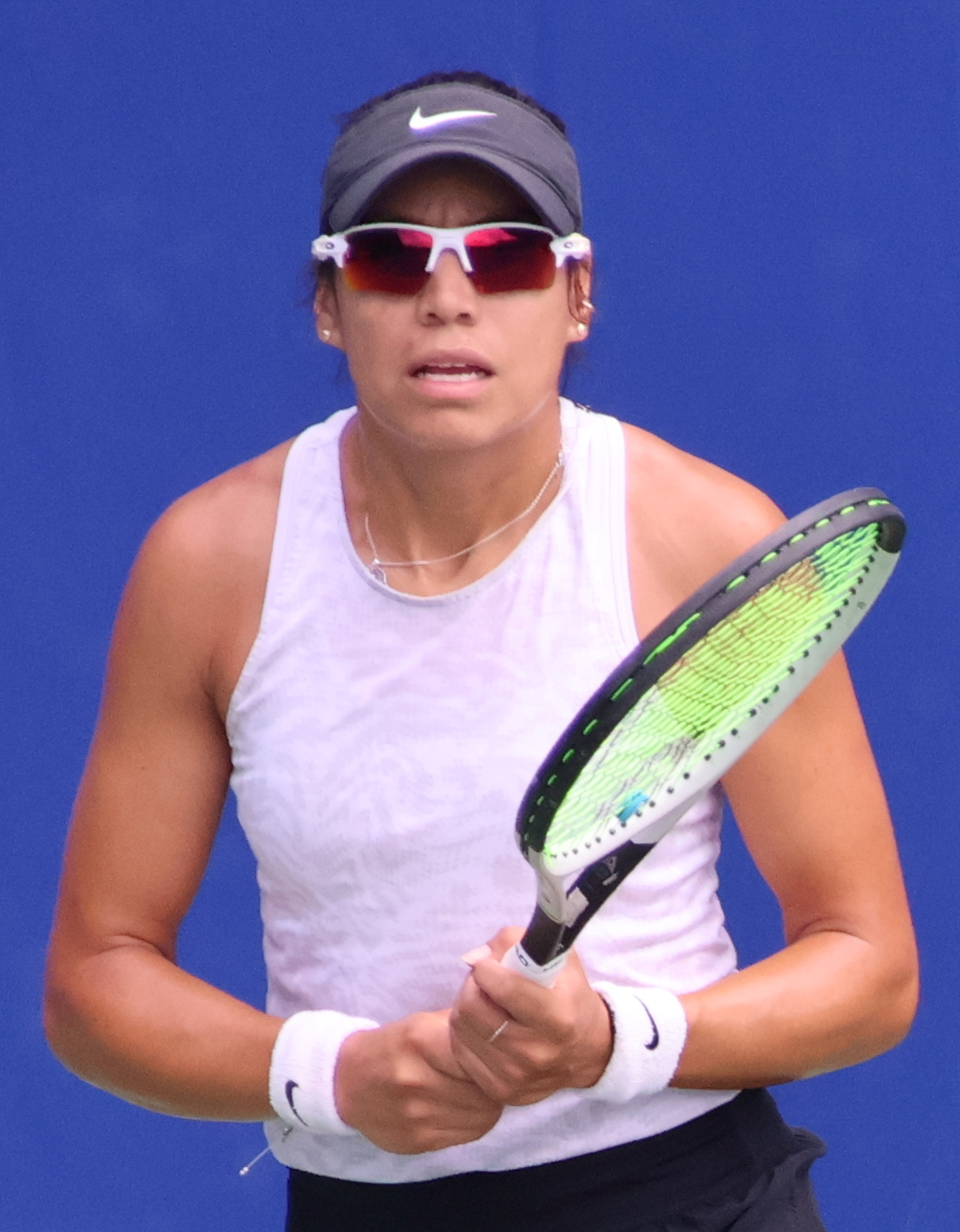
- Rodríguez in 2026
- Full name: Victoria Aracely Rodríguez Arroyo
- Country (sports): Mexico
- Born: 22 April 1995 (age 31) Durango City, Mexico
- Height: 1.70 m (5 ft 7 in)
- Plays: Right-handed
- Prize money: $326,145

Singles
- Career record: 354–265
- Career titles: 9 ITF
- Highest ranking: No. 216 (16 November 2015)
- Current ranking: No. 595 (16 November 2026)

Doubles
- Career record: 301–211
- Career titles: 1 WTA 125, 25 ITF
- Highest ranking: No. 113 (18 June 2018)
- Current ranking: No. 404 (16 November 2026)

Team competitions
- Fed Cup: 5–7
Medal record
Representing Mexico
Pan American Games
Silver medal – second place	2015 Toronto	Women's singles
Silver medal – second place	2015 Toronto	Women's doubles
Central American and Caribbean Games
Gold medal – first place	2014 Veracruz	Women's doubles
Gold medal – first place	2014 Veracruz	Mixed doubles
- Last updated on: 18 November 2026.

Victoria Aracely Rodríguez Arroyo (Note: In this Mexican name, the surname is Rodríguez and the second or maternal family name is Arroyo.) (born 22 April 1995), known as Victoria Rodríguez (Latin American Spanish: [biɣˈtoɾja roˈðɾiɣes]), is a Mexican professional tennis player. She has reached career-high WTA rankings of world No. 216 in singles and No. 113 in doubles.

Rodríguez has won nine singles titles and 25 doubles titles on the ITF Women's Circuit, as well as one WTA 125 doubles title.

Playing for Mexico Fed Cup team, Rodríguez has a win–loss record of 5–7 (doubles 4–4) as of August 2024.

== Career ==
Rodríguez made her WTA Tour debut at the 2013 Abierto Mexicano, partnering Marcela Zacarías in doubles. The Mexican pair won their first-round match against fellow Mexican wildcards Ximena Hermoso and Ana Sofía Sánchez, only to lose in the quarterfinals to the Spanish fourth seeds Lourdes Domínguez Lino and Arantxa Parra Santonja, who went on to win the title.

Ranked No. 300, she received a singles main-draw wildcard for the newly upgraded WTA 500 2024 Monterrey Open, losing to Renata Zarazúa in the first round.

== WTA 125 finals ==
=== Doubles: 1 (title) ===
Result	Date	Tournament	Surface	Partner	Opponent	Score
Win	Nov 2017	Mumbai Open, India	Hard	(Netherlands) Bibiane Schoofs	(Russia) Irina Khromacheva (Slovenia) Dalila Jakupović	7–5, 3–6, [10–7]

== ITF Circuit finals ==
=== Singles: 22 (9 titles, 13 runner-ups) ===
Legend W40 tournaments (0–1) W25/35 tournaments (1–4) W10/15 tournaments (8–8)	Finals by surface Hard (7–11) Clay (2–2)

Result	W–L	Date	Tournament	Tier	Surface	Opponent	Score
Loss	0–1	Aug 2012	ITF San Luis Potosí, Mexico	W10	Hard	(Estonia) Anett Kontaveit	1–6, 1–6
Loss	0–2	Oct 2012	ITF Mexico City, Mexico	W10	Hard	(Mexico) Marcela Zacarías	4–6, 2–6
Loss	0–3	Oct 2012	ITF Victoria, Mexico	W10	Hard	(Russia) Nika Kukharchuk	5–7, 0–6
Win	1–3	Sep 2013	ITF Victoria, Mexico	W15	Hard	(Mexico) Ana Sofía Sánchez	6–2, 4–6, 4–0 ret.
Win	2–3	Oct 2013	ITF Quintana Roo, Mexico	W10	Hard	(United States) Lauren Albanese	6–2, 6–4
Win	3–3	Jun 2014	ITF Quintana Roo, Mexico	W10	Hard	(Mexico) Ana Sofía Sánchez	4–6, 6–2, 6–4
Win	4–3	Aug 2014	ITF Rosarito Beach, Mexico	W10	Hard	(Mexico) Marcela Zacarías	6–3, 6–1
Loss	4–4	Dec 2014	ITF Mérida, Mexico	W25	Hard	(Germany) Tatjana Maria	0–6, 3–6
Loss	4–5	Apr 2015	ITF Guadalajara, Mexico	W15	Hard	(Mexico) Marcela Zacarías	6–4, 4–6, 5–7
Win	5–5	Aug 2015	ITF San Luis Potosí, Mexico	W25	Hard	(Bolivia) María Fernanda Álvarez Terán	7–6^{(3)}, 2–6, 6–3
Loss	5–6	Oct 2016	ITF Mexico City, Mexico	W10	Hard	(United States) Emina Bektas	3–6, 1–6
Win	6–6	Dec 2016	ITF La Paz, Bolivia	W10	Clay	(Argentina) Victoria Bosio	6–1, 7–6^{(5)}
Win	7–6	Dec 2016	ITF Santa Cruz, Bolivia	W10	Clay	(Chile) Fernanda Brito	6–4, 6–3
Loss	7–7	Mar 2017	ITF Orlando, United States	W15	Clay	(Czech Republic) Marie Bouzková	5–7, 7–5, 0–6
Loss	7–8	Mar 2017	ITF Tampa, United States	W15	Clay	(Portugal) Michelle Larcher de Brito	2–6, 0–6
Win	8–8	Jun 2018	ITF Hua Hin, Thailand	W25	Hard	(Israel) Julia Glushko	6–1, 6–4
Loss	8–9	Jul 2018	ITF Gatineau, Canada	W25	Hard	(Australia) Astra Sharma	6–3, 4–6, 3–6
Win	9–9	Jul 2022	ITF Cancún, Mexico	W15	Hard	(Mexico) Lya Isabel Fernández Olivares	6–3, 6–1
Loss	9–10	Aug 2022	ITF Cancún, Mexico	W15	Hard	(Argentina) Solana Sierra	3–6, 3–6
Loss	9–11	Nov 2023	ITF Veracruz, Mexico	W40	Hard	(United States) Hanna Chang	5–7, 1–6
Loss	9–12	Mar 2024	ITF Santo Domingo, Dominican Rep.	W35	Hard	(China) Gao Xinyu	3–6, 2–6
Loss	9–13	Jun 2024	ITF Tauste, Spain	W35	Hard	(Australia) Melisa Ercan	3–6, 0–6

=== Doubles: 53 (25 titles, 28 runner-ups) ===
Legend W100 tournaments (0–1) 80k tournaments (1–1) 60k tournaments (0–2) W50 tournaments (0–3) W25/35 tournaments (13–12) W10/15 tournaments (11–9)	Finals by surface Hard (17–19) Clay (8–9)

Result	W–L	Date	Tournament	Tier	Surface	Partner	Opponents	Score
Loss	0–1	Oct 2012	ITF Victoria, Mexico	10k	Hard	(Mexico) Alejandra Cisneros	(Mexico) Camila Fuentes (United States) Blair Shankle	6–7^{(4)}, 1–6
Loss	0–2	Oct 2013	ITF Tampico, Mexico	25k	Hard	(Mexico) Constanza Gorches	(Bolivia) María Fernanda Álvarez (Argentina) María Irigoyen	3–6, 4–6
Win	1–2	Apr 2014	ITF Antalya, Turkey	10k	Hard	(Mexico) Marcela Zacarías	(Mexico) Camila Fuentes (Hungary) Szabina Szlavikovics	6–1, 6–1
Win	2–2	Apr 2014	ITF Antalya, Turkey	10k	Hard	(Mexico) Marcela Zacarías	(Ukraine) Alona Fomina (Chinese Taipei) Lee Pei-chi	6–4, 4–6, [10–5]
Win	3–2	May 2014	ITF Antalya, Turkey	10k	Hard	(Mexico) Marcela Zacarías	(United States) Alexa Guarachi (United States) Kate Turvy	6–1, 1–6, [10–4]
Loss	3–3	Jun 2014	ITF Quintana Roo, Mexico	10k	Hard	(Mexico) Marcela Zacarías	(United States) Anamika Bhargava (United States) Allie Will	2–6, 2–6
Loss	3–4	Jun 2014	ITF Quintana Roo, Mexico	10k	Hard	(Mexico) Marcela Zacarías	(United States) Anamika Bhargava (United States) Allie Will	0–6, 4–6
Win	4–4	Aug 2014	ITF Rosarito Beach, Mexico	10k	Hard	(Mexico) Marcela Zacarías	(United States) Alexandra Cercone (United States) Alexa Guarachi	6–4, 6–1
Win	5–4	Aug 2014	ITF San Luis Potosí, Mexico	10k	Hard	(Mexico) Marcela Zacarías	(United States) Erin Clark (Japan) Ayaka Okuno	6–1, 5–7, [10–8]
Win	6–4	Feb 2015	ITF Cuernavaca, Mexico	25k	Hard	(Mexico) Marcela Zacarías	(United States) Alexandra Morozova (United States) Daniella Roldan	6–4, 6–0
Win	7–4	Mar 2015	ITF Irapuato, Mexico	25k	Hard	(Mexico) Marcela Zacarías	(Japan) Ayaka Okuno (Mexico) Ana Sofía Sánchez	6–1, 7–5
Loss	7–5	Mar 2015	ITF Metepec, Mexico	10k	Hard	(Mexico) Marcela Zacarías	(Brazil) Maria Fernanda Alves (United States) Kaitlyn Christian	6–2, 1–6, [13–15]
Win	8–5	May 2015	ITF Obregón, Mexico	15k	Hard	(Mexico) Marcela Zacarías	(Mexico) Ana Sofía Sánchez (Dominican Republic) Francesca Segarelli	6–3, 6–1
Loss	8–6	Jun 2015	ITF Périgueux, France	25k	Clay	(Mexico) Marcela Zacarías	(Brazil) Gabriela Cé (Argentina) Florencia Molinero	3–6, 2–6
Loss	8–7	Jul 2015	ITF Gatineau, Canada	25k	Hard	(Mexico) Marcela Zacarías	(Australia) Jessica Moore (Canada) Carol Zhao	3–6, 4–6
Win	9–7	Nov 2015	ITF Santiago, Chile	25k	Clay	(Mexico) Renata Zarazúa	(Argentina) Florencia Molinero (Brazil) Laura Pigossi	6–2, 5–7, [10–7]
Loss	9–8	Oct 2016	ITF Mexico City, Mexico	10k	Hard	(Mexico) Alexia Coutino Castillo	(United States) Emina Bektas (United States) Jessica Wacnik	3–6, 4–6
Win	10–8	Nov 2016	ITF Santiago, Chile	10k	Clay	(Mexico) Ana Sofía Sánchez	(Chile) Fernanda Brito (Paraguay) Camila Giangreco Campiz	7–5, 7–5
Win	11–8	Dec 2016	ITF La Paz, Bolivia	10k	Clay	(Argentina) Victoria Bosio	(United States) Stephanie Nemtsova (Brazil) Thaisa Grana Pedretti	7–6^{(2)}, 6–4
Loss	11–9	Dec 2016	ITF Santa Cruz, Bolivia	10k	Clay	(Argentina) Victoria Bosio	(Chile) Fernanda Brito (Paraguay) Camila Giangreco Campiz	2–6, 5–7
Loss	11–10	Jun 2017	ITF Figueira da Foz, Portugal	25k	Hard	(Colombia) María Herazo González	(Turkey) Ayla Aksu (Romania) Raluca Șerban	4–6, 1–6
Loss	11–11	Jun 2017	Open Montpellier, France	25k	Clay	(Brazil) Laura Pigossi	(Japan) Momoko Kobori (Japan) Ayano Shimizu	3–6, 6–4, [7–10]
Win	12–11	Jul 2017	ITS Cup, Czech Republic	80k	Clay	(France) Amandine Hesse	(Slovakia) Michaela Hončová (Romania) Raluca Șerban	3–6, 6–2, [10–6]
Loss	12–12	Nov 2017	Toronto Challenger, Canada	60k	Hard (i)	(Belgium) Ysaline Bonaventure	(Chile) Alexa Guarachi (New Zealand) Erin Routliffe	6–7^{(4)}, 6–3, [4–10]
Win	13–12	Jun 2018	ITF Hua Hin, Thailand	25k	Hard	(New Zealand) Erin Routliffe	(Thailand) Nicha Lertpitaksinchai (Thailand) Peangtarn Plipuech	7–5, 3–6, [10–6]
Win	14–12	Jun 2018	ITF Hua Hin, Thailand	25k	Hard	(New Zealand) Erin Routliffe	(Japan) Mana Ayukawa (Switzerland) Nina Stadler	6–4, 6–4
Win	15–12	Jul 2018	ITF Winnipeg, Canada	25k	Hard	(Japan) Akiko Omae	(Israel) Julia Glushko (United States) Sanaz Marand	7–6^{(2)}, 6–3
Loss	15–13	Aug 2018	Lexington Open, United States	60k	Hard	(United States) Sanaz Marand	(United States) Hayley Carter (United States) Ena Shibahara	3–6, 1–6
Win	16–13	Apr 2019	ITF Cancún, Mexico	W15	Hard	(Mexico) Marcela Zacarías	(Japan) Yuriko Miyazaki (France) Mathilde Armitano	6–2, 6–0
Win	17–13	Jun 2019	ITF Nonthaburi, Thailand	W25	Hard	(Uzbekistan) Sabina Sharipova	(United States) Lorraine Guillermo (United States) Maegan Manasse	6–3, 6–4
Loss	17–14	Jul 2019	Open de Biarritz, France	W80	Clay	(Romania) Ioana Loredana Roșca	(France) Manon Arcangioli (Belgium) Kimberley Zimmermann	6–2, 3–6, [6–10]
Win	18–14	Jul 2019	ITF Vitoria-Gasteiz, Spain	W25	Hard	(Mexico) Ana Sofía Sánchez	(Spain) Alba Carrillo Marín (Spain) Ángela Fita Boluda	6–3, 6–3
Win	19–14	Aug 2019	ITF Las Palmas, Spain	W25	Hard	(Mexico) Ana Sofía Sánchez	(Spain) Marina Bassols Ribera (China) Feng Shuo	6–3, 7–5
Loss	19–15	Jan 2020	ITF Cancún, Mexico	W15	Hard	(United States) Sofia Sewing	(Lithuania) Justina Mikulskytė (Netherlands) Lian Tran	2–6, 6–4, [7–10]
Loss	19-16	May 2021	ITF Salinas, Ecuador	W25	Hard	(Mexico) Ana Sofía Sánchez	(United States) Rasheeda McAdoo (Switzerland) Conny Perrin	4–6, 6–7^{(5)}
Loss	19-17	Sep 2021	Open Medellin, Colombia	W25	Clay	(United States) Rasheeda McAdoo	(Colombia) María Herazo González (Brazil) Laura Pigossi	2–6, 5–7
Win	20–17	Sep 2021	ITF Cancún, Mexico	W15	Hard	(Mexico) María Portillo Ramírez	(United States) Qavia Lopez (Switzerland) Chelsea Fontenel	6–1, 6–1
Loss	20–18	Oct 2021	ITF Lima, Peru	W25	Clay	(Netherlands) Bibiane Schoofs	(Brazil) Carolina Alves (Venezuela) Andrea Gamiz	3–6, 6–7^{(2)}
Loss	20–19	Oct 2021	ITF Guayaquil, Ecuador	W25	Clay	(Bosnia and Herzegovina) Dea Herdželaš	(Colombia) María Herazo González (Colombia) María Paulina Pérez	3–6, 6–4, [7–10]
Loss	20–20	Dec 2021	ITF Cancún, Mexico	W15	Hard	(Mexico) Jessica Hinojosa Gómez	(Canada) Stacey Fung (United States) Pamela Montez	4–6, 2–6
Win	21–20	Jul 2022	ITF Cancún, Mexico	W15	Hard	(Mexico) Jessica Hinojosa Gómez	(Spain) Alicia Herrero Liñana (Argentina) Melany Krywoj	6–2, 7–5
Loss	21–21	Sep 2022	ITF Cancún, Mexico	W15	Hard	(Mexico) Jessica Hinojosa Gómez	(Mexico) Fernanda Navarro (United States) Lauren Proctor	3–6, 7–5, [7–10]
Win	22-21	Jul 2023	ITF Bragado, Argentina	W25	Clay	(Peru) Romina Ccuno	(Argentina) Luciana Moyano (Argentina) Candela Vasquez	6–2, 6–3
Win	23-21	Jul 2023	ITF Junín, Argentina	W25	Clay	(Peru) Romina Ccuno	(Argentina) Julieta Lara Estable (Chile) Fernanda Labraña	6–2, 2–6, [10–7]
Win	24-21	Oct 2023	ITF Mendoza, Argentina	W25	Clay	(Peru) Romina Ccuno	(Italy) Nicole Fossa Huergo (Germany) Luisa Meyer auf der Heide	6–3, 6–3
Loss	24-22	Jun 2024	ITF Tauste, Spain	W35	Hard	(Australia) Alana Parnaby	(India) Rutuja Bhosale (China) Tian Fangran	2–6, 4–6
Win	25-22	Jan 2025	ITF Buenos Aires, Argentina	W35	Clay	(Mexico) Ana Sofía Sánchez	(Czech Republic) Michaela Bayerlová (Romania) Briana Szabó	5–7, 6–2, [10-8]
Loss	25–23	Apr 2025	ITF Charlotte, United States	W35	Clay	(Mexico) María Portillo Ramírez	(Japan) Haruna Arakawa (Bosnia and Herzegovina) Ema Burgić	2–6, 5–7
Loss	25–24	Jun 2025	ITF Palma del Río, Spain	W50	Hard	(Colombia) María Paulina Pérez	(China) Feng Shuo (Chinese Taipei) Liang En-shuo	2–6, 3–6
Loss	25-25	Nov 2025	ITF Irapuato, Mexico	W100	Hard	(Mexico) Ana Sofía Sánchez	(United States) Victoria Hu (United States) Dalayna Hewitt	4–6, 4–6
Loss	25–26	Mar 2026	ITF Chihuahua, Mexico	W50	Clay	(Mexico) Ana Sofía Sánchez	(Venezuela) Sofía Cabezas Domínguez (Argentina) Jazmín Ortenzi	5–7, 0–6
Loss	25–27	Aug 2026	ITF Southaven, United States	W35	Hard	(Mexico) Fernanda Navarro	(Romania) Carmen Andreea Herea (Ukraine) Anita Sahdiieva	3–6, 7–5, [6–10]
Loss	25–28	Nov 2026	ITF Huamantla, Mexico	W50	Hard	(Netherlands) Demi Tran	(Mexico) Fernanda Navarro (Poland) Zuzanna Pawlikowska	4–6, 6–4, [2–10]
