= Diego Galeano (tennis) =

Paraguayan tennis player (born 1992)

- Full name: Diego Sebastian Galeano
- Country (sports): Paraguay
- Born: 1 February 1992 (age 33); Asunción, Paraguay
- Height: 5 ft 11 in (180 cm)
- Plays: Right-handed
- Prize money: $8,447

Singles
- Career record: 9–5
- Highest ranking: No. 663 (15 August 2011)

Doubles
- Career record: 2–5
- Highest ranking: No. 411 (15 August 2011)

National Secretary of Sports
- In office 25 May 2022 – 15 August 2023
- President: Mario Abdo Benítez
- Preceded by: Fátima Morales
- Succeeded by: César Ramírez
Medal record
Pan American Games
Bronze medal – third place	2015 Toronto	Mixed Doubles

Diego Sebastian Galeano (born 1 February 1992) is a Paraguayan former professional tennis player.

== Tennis career ==
Born in Asunción, Galeano was a top 100 junior and made his Davis Cup debut as a 17-year old in 2009. He represented Paraguay at the 2010 Summer Youth Olympics, where he lost a bronze medal playoff in the doubles.

Galeano played college tennis for Baylor University from 2012 to 2015. He won the USTA/ITA Texas Regional singles championship in 2013 and was a doubles semi-finalist (with Julian Lenz) at the 2015 NCAA Championships.

In 2015 he competed at the Pan American Games in Toronto and won a bronze medal in the mixed doubles, partnering Verónica Cepede Royg. He made it through to the quarter-finals of the singles draw, beating seeded players Marcelo Arévalo and Giovanni Lapentti en route.

Galeano has featured in a total of 13 ties for the Paraguay Davis Cup team, most recently in 2018.
