= Guatemala at the 2015 Pan American Games =

- IOC code: GUA
- NOC: Comité Olímpico Guatemalteco
- Website: www.cog.org.gt

in Toronto, Canada 10–26 July 2015
- Competitors: 149 in 28 sports
- Flag bearer (opening): Mirna Ortiz
- Flag bearer (closing): Erick Barrondo
- Medals Ranked 10th: Gold 6 Silver 1 Bronze 3 Total 10

Pan American Games appearances (overview)
- 1951; 1955; 1959; 1963; 1967; 1971; 1975; 1979; 1983; 1987; 1991; 1995; 1999; 2003; 2007; 2011; 2015; 2019; 2023; 2027

Other related appearances
- Independent Athletes Team (2023)

Guatemala competed in the 2015 Pan American Games in Toronto, Ontario, Canada from July 10 to 26, 2015.

Race walker Mirna Ortiz was the flagbearer at the head of the country's contingent at the opening ceremony.

== Competitors ==
The following table lists Guatemala's delegation per sport and gender.

Sport	Men	Women	Total
Archery	2	1	3
Athletics	6	1	7
Badminton	4	4	8
Beach volleyball	2	2	4
Bowling	2	2	4
Boxing	5	0	5
Canoeing	1	0	1
Cycling	3	6	9
Equestrian	5	7	12
Fencing	1	0	1
Golf	2	2	4
Gymnastics	1	1	2
Judo	0	3	3
Modern pentathlon	2	3	5
Racquetball	2	2	4
Roller sports	1	1	2
Rowing	7	1	8
Sailing	3	2	5
Shooting	14	7	21
Squash	3	3	6
Swimming	3	5	8
Synchronized swimming	—N/a	2	2
Table tennis	3	3	6
Taekwondo	3	2	5
Tennis	2	1	3
Triathlon	1	2	3
Water skiing	1	0	1
Weightlifting	2	2	4
Wrestling	1	0	1
Total	84	65	149

== Medalists ==
The following competitors from Guatemala won medals at the games. In the by discipline sections below, medalists' names are bolded.

Medal	Name	Sport	Event	Date
Gold	Jorge Vega Lopez	Gymnastics	Men's floor	July 14
Gold	Kevin Cordon	Badminton	Men's singles	July 16
Gold	Hebert Brol	Shooting	Men's double trap	July 16
Gold	Juan Ignacio Maegli	Sailing	Men's laser	July 18
Gold	Jason Hess; Irene Abascal van Blerk	Sailing	Hobie 16	July 19
Gold	Charles Fernandez	Modern pentathlon	Men's	July 19
Silver	Erick Barrondo	Athletics	Men's 50 km walk	July 26
Bronze	Ana Sofía Gómez	Gymnastics	Women's floor	July 15
Bronze	Enrique Brol	Shooting	Men's double trap	July 16
Bronze	Kevin Luna	Boxing	Men's lightweight	July 23

**Medals by sport**
**Sport**	1st place, gold medalist(s)	2nd place, silver medalist(s)	3rd place, bronze medalist(s)	**Total**
Sailing	2	0	0	2
Gymnastics	1	0	1	2
Shooting	1	0	1	2
Badminton	1	0	0	1
Modern pentathlon	1	0	0	1
Athletics	0	1	0	1
Boxing	0	0	1	1
**Total**	**6**	**1**	**3**	**10**

**Medals by day**
**Day**	1st place, gold medalist(s)	2nd place, silver medalist(s)	3rd place, bronze medalist(s)	**Total**
July 10	0	0	0	0
July 11	0	0	0	0
July 12	0	0	0	0
July 13	0	0	0	0
July 14	1	0	0	1
July 15	0	0	1	1
July 16	2	0	1	3
July 17	0	0	0	0
July 18	1	0	0	1
July 19	2	0	0	2
July 20	0	0	0	0
July 21	0	0	0	0
July 22	0	0	0	0
July 23	0	0	1	1
July 24	0	0	0	0
July 25	0	0	0	0
July 26	0	1	0	1
**Total**	**6**	**1**	**3**	**10**

== Archery ==
Guatemala qualified two male archers based on its performance at the 2014 Pan American Championships. Later Guatemala qualified 1 woman based on its performance at the 2015 Copa Merengue.

Athlete	Event	Ranking Round		Round of 32	Round of 16	Quarterfinals	Semifinals	Final / BM	Rank
Athlete	Event	Score	Seed	Opposition Score	Opposition Score	Opposition Score	Opposition Score	Opposition Score	Rank
Diego Castro	Men's individual	616	29	Marcus Vinicius D'Almeida (BRA); L 0–6	Did not advance				=17
Thomas Flossbach	Men's individual	623	25	Juan René Serrano (MEX); W 6–3	Jose Irizarry (PUR); W 6–0	Zach Garrett (USA); L 6–2	Did not advance		=5
Yesenia Valencia	Women's individual	6	21	Larissa Feitosa (BRA); L 4–6	Did not advance				=17

== Athletics ==
Guatemala qualified seven athletes (six men and one woman).

Key

- Note–Ranks given for track events are for the entire round
- Q = Qualified for the next round
- q = Qualified for the next round as a fastest loser or, in field events, by position without achieving the qualifying target
- SB = Seasonal best
- DQ = Disqualified
- N/A = Round not applicable for the event

Men

Athlete	Event	Semifinal		Final	
Athlete	Event	Result	Rank	Result	Rank
Gerber Blanco	400 metres hurdles	52.74	6	Did not advance	
Mario Pacay	5000 m	—N/a		14:07.87	11
Mario Pacay	10,000 m	—N/a		30:16.37	7
Erick Barrondo	20 km walk	—N/a		DQ	
Erick Barrondo	50 km walk	—N/a		3:55:57	2nd place, silver medalist(s)
Jose Raymundo	20 km walk	—N/a		1:35:45	9
Mario Alfonso Bran	50 km walk	—N/a		4:15:06	7
José Amado García	Marathon	—N/a		2:28:08	12

Women

Athlete	Event	Final	
Athlete	Event	Result	Rank
Mirna Ortiz	20 km walk	DQ	

== Badminton ==
Guatemala has qualified a full team of eight athletes (four men and four women).

Men

Athlete	Event	First round	Round of 32	Round of 16	Quarterfinals	Semifinals	Final	Rank
Athlete	Event	Opposition Result	Opposition Result	Opposition Result	Opposition Result	Opposition Result	Opposition Result	Rank
Kevin Cordón	Singles	Bye	Reid (JAM); W (21–12, 21–14)	Garrido (MEX); W (21–13, 21–13)	Coelho (BRA); W (21–18, 21–15)	Shu (USA); W (16–21, 21–14, 21–18)	D'Souza (CAN); W (21–13, 21–14)	1st place, gold medalist(s)
Heymard Humblers	Singles	Bye	Thorpe (BAR); W (21–5, 21–7)	Pongnairat (USA); L (11–21, 21–21, 17–21)	Did not advance			
Rodolfo Ramírez	Singles	Araya (CHI); W (21–9, 21–8)	Thouyaret (ARG); W (21–14, 21–6)	Paiola (BRA); L (11–21, 17–21)	Did not advance			
Jonathan Solís; Rodolfo Ramírez	Doubles	—N/a		Bye	Arthuso / Paiola (BRA); L (15–21, 18–21)	Did not advance		

Women

Athlete	Event	First round	Round of 32	Round of 16	Quarterfinals	Semifinals	Final	Rank
Athlete	Event	Opposition Result	Opposition Result	Opposition Result	Opposition Result	Opposition Result	Opposition Result	Rank
Alejandra Paiz	Singles	Bye	Garmendia (ARG); W (21–13, 19–21, 21–13)	Macías (PER); L (3–21, 2–21)	Did not advance			
Nikté Sotomayor	Singles	Ugalde (MEX); W (15–21, 17–21)	Did not advance					
Diana Corleto	Singles	Bye	Subandhi (USA); L (21–21, 21–21)	Did not advance				
Mariana Paiz; Diana Corleto	Doubles	—N/a		Honderich / Li (CAN); L (4–21, 8–21)	Did not advance			

Mixed

Athlete	Event	First round	Round of 16	Quarterfinals	Semifinals	Final	Rank
Athlete	Event	Opposition Result	Opposition Result	Opposition Result	Opposition Result	Opposition Result	Rank
Heymard Humblers; Nikté Sotomayor	Doubles	Tjong / Vicente (BRA); L (10–21, 18–21)	Did not advance				

== Beach volleyball ==
Guatemala has qualified a men's and women's pair for a total of four athletes.

Athlete	Event	Preliminary Round				Quarterfinals	Semifinals	13th/15th place match	
Athlete	Event	Opposition Score	Opposition Score	Opposition Score	Rank	Opposition Score	Opposition Score	Opposition Score	Rank
Luis García Betancourt; Julio Recinos Ocaña	Men's	Cairus / Vieyto (URU); L (15–21, 16–21)	Binstock / Schachter (CAN); L (9–21, 9–21)	Romero / Alvarado (NCA); L (17–21, 21–17, 7–15)	4	Did not advance		Daniel / de Cuba (ARU); L (18–21, 18–21)	16
María José Orellana; Blanca Recinos	Women's	Galindo / Galindo (COL); L (14–21, 15–21)	Larsen / Metter (USA); L (13–21, 18–21)	Molina / Soler (ESA); L (18–21, 23–21, 12–15)	4	Did not advance		Davidson / Dyette (TRI); W (21–15, 21–16)	13

== Boxing ==
Guatemala qualified five male boxers.

Men

Athlete	Event	Preliminaries	Quarterfinals	Semifinals	Final	Rank
Athlete	Event	Opposition Result	Opposition Result	Opposition Result	Opposition Result	Rank
Alvaro Vargas	Light flyweight	Elliston (USA); W 3–0	Velázquez (MEX); L 0–3	Did not advance		=5
Eddi Valenzuela	Flyweight	Henriques (BRA); W 2–1	Veitía (CUB); L 0–3	Did not advance		=5
Juan Reyes	Bantamweight	Dos Santos (BRA); L 1–2	Did not advance			=9
Kevin Luna	Lightweight	—N/a	Sánchez (ARG); W 2–1	Álvarez (CUB); L 0–3	Did not advance	3rd place, bronze medalist(s)
Carlos Tobar Romero	Light Welterweight	Ramirez (CRC); L 1–2	Did not advance			=9

== Canoeing ==
=== Sprint ===
Guatemala has received one wildcard in men's kayak.

Men

Athlete	Event	Heats		Semifinals		Final	
Athlete	Event	Time	Rank	Time	Rank	Time	Rank
Edvin Buc Solorzano	K-1 200 m	42.057	5 SF	45.752	5	Did not advance	
Edvin Buc Solorzano	K-1 1000 m	—N/a				4:06.288	8

Qualification Legend: QF = Qualify to final; QS = Qualify to semifinal

== Cycling ==
Guatemala has qualified nine cyclists (three men and six women). Some of the athletes will compete in multiple disciplines.

=== Road ===
Six cyclists competed for Guatemala in the road competitions.

Men

Athlete	Event	Time	Rank
Jhonathan de Leon	Road race	Did not finish	
Manuel Rodas	Road race	3:46:36	15
Manuel Rodas	Time trial	47:48.64	5
Alfredo Ajpacaja Tax	Road race	3:46:36	14

Women

Athlete	Event	Time	Rank
Cynthia Lee Lopez	Road race	2:22:56	31
Jasmin Soto Lopez	Road race	2:22:56	32
Emelyn Galicia Ramirez	Road race	2:07:54	21

=== Mountain biking ===
Guatemala entered one male mountain biker.

Men

Athlete	Event	Time	Rank
Jhonnthan de Leon	Cross-country	1:40:38	13

== Fencing ==
Guatemala has qualified one male fencer.

Men

Athlete	Event	Pool Round		Round of 16	Quarterfinals	Semifinals	Final	
Athlete	Event	Victories	Seed	Opposition Score	Opposition Score	Opposition Score	Opposition Score	Rank
Gerber Morales	Individual épée	1	18	Did not advance				

== Golf ==
Guatemala qualified a full team of four golfers.

Athlete(s)	Event	Final					
Athlete(s)	Event	Round 1	Round 2	Round 3	Round 4	Total	Rank
Sebastian Barnoya	Men's individual	77	79	74	75	305 (+17)	28
Daniel Gurtner	Men's individual	76	76	71	73	296 (+8)	=18
Pilar Echeverria	Women's individual	78	83	76	78	315 (+27)	21
Lucia Polo	Women's individual	77	78	76	72	303 (+15)	=11
Sebastian Barnoya; Daniel Gurtner; Pilar Echeverria; Lucia Polo	Mixed team	153	154	147	145	599 (+23)	=10

== Gymnastics ==
=== Artistic ===
Guatemala qualified 2 gymnasts.

Men
Individual Qualification

Athlete	Event	Qualification							
Athlete	Event	Apparatus						Total	Rank
Athlete	Event	F	PH	R	V	PB	HB	Total	Rank
Jorge Vega Lopez	Qualification	14.850 Q	10.850	13.300	14.400 Q	13.150	12.250	78.800	18 Q

Individual Finals

Athlete	Event	Apparatus						Total	Rank
Athlete	Event	F	PH	R	V	PB	HB	Total	Rank
Jorge Vega Lopez	All-around	14.900	11.000	13.400	15.350	13.150	12.400	80.200	14
Jorge Vega Lopez	Floor	15.150	—N/a					15.150	1st place, gold medalist(s)
Jorge Vega Lopez	Vault	—N/a			14.775	—N/a		14.775	4

Qualification Legend: Q = Qualified to apparatus final

Women
Individual Qualification

Athlete	Event	Qualification					
Athlete	Event	Apparatus				Total	Rank
Athlete	Event	F	V	UB	BB	Total	Rank
Ana Sofía Gómez	Qualification	14.600 Q	14.250	14.350 Q	14.000 Q	57.200	3 Q

Individual Finals

Athlete	Event	Apparatus				Total	Rank
Athlete	Event	F	V	UB	BB	Total	Rank
Ana Sofía Gómez	All-around	14.650	11.800	14.400	13.450	54.300	7
Ana Sofía Gómez	Floor	14.150	—N/a			14.150	3rd place, bronze medalist(s)
Ana Sofía Gómez	Uneven bars	—N/a		13.900	—N/a	13.900	5
Ana Sofía Gómez	Balance beam	—N/a			12.325	12.325	7

Qualification Legend: Q = Qualified to apparatus final

== Judo ==
Guatemala has qualified a team of three female judokas.

Women

Athlete	Event	Round of 16	Quarterfinals	Semifinals	Repechage	Final / BM	
Athlete	Event	Opposition Result	Opposition Result	Opposition Result	Opposition Result	Opposition Result	Rank
Yennifer Dominguez	−63 kg	Diana Velasco (COL); L 0002-0001	Did not advance				
Jenifer Ortiz	−70 kg	Katie Sell (USA); L 000H-1000	Did not advance				
Mirla Nolberto	−78 kg	Bye	Kayla Harrison (USA); L 0000-1000	Did not advance	Diana Chalá (ECU); L 0001-0000	Did not advance	7

== Modern pentathlon ==
Guatemala has qualified a team of 5 athletes (2 men and 3 women).

Athlete	Event	Fencing (Épée One Touch)			Swimming (200m Freestyle)			Riding (Show Jumping)			Shooting/Running (10 m Air Pistol/3000m)			Total Points	Final Rank
Athlete	Event	Victories	Rank	MP points	Time	Rank	MP points	Penalties	Rank	MP points	Time	Rank	MP points	Total Points	Final Rank
Jorge Imeri Cabrera	Men's	14	14	202	2:08.52	15	315	16	5	284	12:52.58	15	258	1329	12
Charles Fernandez	Men's	24	1	282	2:03.98	4	329	28	11	272	12:21.18	8	559	1444	1st place, gold medalist(s)
Isabel Brand	Women's	14	4	242	2:23.91	14	269	21	=8	279	13:32.83	6	488	1278	6
Ximena Dieguez	Women's	7	=19	182	2:31.83	20	245	7	=3	293	15:01.76	15	399	1119	18
Sophia Hernandez	Women's	16	2	259	2:30.31	18	250	19	7	281	15:11.04	17	389	1179	15

== Racquetball ==
Guatemala qualified a team of two men and two women for a total of four athletes.

Singles and Doubles

Athlete(s)	Event	Qualifying Round robin				Round of 32	Round of 16	Quarterfinals	Semifinals	Final	Rank
Athlete(s)	Event	Match 1	Match 2	Match 3	Rank	Opposition Result	Opposition Result	Opposition Result	Opposition Result	Opposition Result	Rank
Edwin Galicia	Men's singles	Acuña (CRC); L 0–2	Keller (BOL); L 0–2	Rios (ECU); W (WO)	3	Bye	Herrera (COL); L 0–2	Did not advance			
Christian Wer	Men's singles	Iwaasa (CAN); L 0–2	Moscoso (BOL); L 0–2	De La Rosa (MEX); L 0–2	4	de León (DOM); L 1–2	Did not advance				
Edwin Galicia; Christian Wer	Men's doubles	Moscoso / Keller (BOL); L 0–2	Castillo / Castro (VEN); L 0–2	Pérez / de León (DOM); L 0–2	4	—N/a	Maggi / Manzuri (ARG); L 0–2	Did not advance			
Gabriela Martinez	Women's singles	Riveros (BOL); L 1–2	Salas (MEX); L 0–2	Key (USA); L 0–2	4	Grisar (CHI); W (WO)	Longoria (MEX); L 0–2	Did not advance			
Maria Rodriguez	Women's singles	Paredes (VEN); L 0–2	Longoria (MEX); L 0–2	Amaya (COL); L 0–2	4	Tobon (VEN); L 1–2	Did not advance				
Gabriela Martinez; Maria Rodriguez	Women's doubles	Rajsich / Russell (USA); L 0–2	Vargas / Guillemette (ARG); L 1–2	—N/a	3	—N/a	Loma / Mendez (BOL); L 1–2	Did not advance			

Team

Athletes	Event	First round	Quarterfinals	Semifinals	Final	
Athletes	Event	Opposition Result	Opposition Result	Opposition Result	Opposition Result	Rank
Edwin Galicia; Christian Wer	Men's team	Venezuela; L 1–2	Did not advance			=9
Gabriela Martínez; Maria Rodriguez	Women's team	Canada; L 1–2	Did not advance			=9

== Roller sports ==
Guatemala has qualified two athletes (one male and one female) in the speed competitions.

=== Speed ===
Athlete	Event	Semifinal		Final	
Athlete	Event	Time	Rank	Time/Points	Rank
Eduardo Mollinedo	Men's 200 m time trial	—N/a		17.908	11
Eduardo Mollinedo	Men's 500 m	40.518	5	Did not advance	
Eduardo Mollinedo	Men's 10,000 m points race	—N/a		Did not finish	
Dalia Soberanis	Women's 200 m time trial	—N/a		18.911	8
Dalia Soberanis	Women's 500 m	44.079	4	Did not advance	
Dalia Soberanis	Women's 10,000 m points race	—N/a		Did not finish	

== Rowing ==
Guatemala has qualified 4 boats.

Athlete	Event	Heats		Repechage		Final	
Athlete	Event	Time	Rank	Time	Rank	Time	Rank
Revolorio Garcia	Men's Single Sculls	7.32.37	4 R	7.32.03	2 FA	8:18.14	6
Gunther Slowing Rossil; Juan Guevara Gonzalez	Men's Lwt Double Sculls	7:17.52	5 R	7:10.91	5 FB	6:39.40	9
Gerardo Campa Roche; Jorge Chiquin Pineda; Juan Bojorquez Galvez; Leif Catalan Flores	Men's Quadruple Sculls	6:13.10	5 FA	—N/a		6:12.87	6
Jennieffer Zuniga Mazariegos	Women's Lwt Single Sculls	8:20.75	5 R	8:57.12	4 FB	10:25.95	10

Qualification Legend: FA=Final A (medal); FB=Final B (non-medal); R=Repechage

== Sailing ==
Guatemala qualified 4 boats (five athletes).

Athlete	Event	Race													Total Points	Net Points	Final Rank
Athlete	Event	1	2	3	4	5	6	7	8	9	10	11	12	M*	Total Points	Net Points	Final Rank
Juan Ignacio Maegli	Laser	(17) DNF	2	4	2	2	2	1	5	3	5	2	5	6	56	39	1st place, gold medalist(s)
Andrea Aldana	Laser Radial	8	5	8	9	12	9	4	6	8	13	(14)	8	—N/a	104	90	10
Gabriel Sanz	Sunfish	10	(12)	12	9	11	11	11	10	11	10	11	12	—N/a	130	118	12
Jason Hess; Irene Abascal van Blerk	Hobie 16	2	3	(6)	5	1	5	2	4	1	1	1	1	4	36	30	1st place, gold medalist(s)

== Squash ==
Guatemala has qualified a full team of six athletes (three men and three women).

Singles and Doubles

Athlete(s)	Event	Round of 32	Round of 16	Quarterfinals	Semifinals	Final	
Athlete(s)	Event	Opposition Result	Opposition Result	Opposition Result	Opposition Result	Opposition Result	Rank
Josue Enriquez	Men's singles	Bye	Christopher Gordon (USA); L 1–3	Did not advance			=9
Mauricio Sedano	Men's singles	Sunil Seth (GUY); L 0–3	Did not advance				=17
Bryan Bonilla; Josue Enriquez	Men's doubles	—N/a	Bye	Christopher Gordon / Christopher Hanson (USA); L 0–2	Did not advance		=5
Pamela Anckermann	Women's singles	—N/a	Samantha Cornett (CAN); L 0–3	Did not advance			=9
Winifer Bonilla	Women's singles	—N/a	Anita Pinto (CHI); L 0–3	Did not advance			=9
Pamela Anckermann; Winifer Bonilla	Women's doubles	—N/a	Samantha Cornett / Nikki Todd (CAN); L 0–2	Did not advance			=9

Team

Athletes	Event	Group stage				Quarterfinals/Classification round 1	5th place/7th place match	
Athletes	Event	Opposition Result	Opposition Result	Opposition Result	Rank	Opposition Result	Opposition Result	Rank
Bryan Bonilla; Josue Enriquez; Mauricio Sedano	Men's team	United States; L 0–3	Chile; W 2–1	—N/a	2	Argentina; L 0–2	Colombia; W 2–0	5
Pamela Anckermann; Irene Barillas; Winifer Bonilla	Women's team	Mexico; L 0–3	United States; L 0–3	Chile; L 0–3	4	Argentina; L 0–2	Brazil; L 0–2	8

== Shooting ==
Guatemala qualified 21 shooters (14 male and 7 female).

Men

Athlete	Event	Qualification		Semifinal		Final	
Athlete	Event	Points	Rank	Points	Rank	Points	Rank
Jose Castillo Aguilar	50 metre pistol	521-08x	19	—N/a		Did not advance	
Jose Castillo Aguilar	10 metre air pistol	555-09x	26	—N/a		Did not advance	
Dany Brol	Trap	100	17	Did not advance			
Enrique Brol	Double trap	125	5 Q	26	=3 BM	29	3rd place, bronze medalist(s)
Hebert Brol	Double trap	133	2 Q, PR	27	2 GM	27	1st place, gold medalist(s)
Jean Pierre Brol	Trap	108	12	Did not advance			
Allan Chinchilla	50 metre rifle three positions	Disqualified		—N/a		Did not advance	
Marvin Herrera	25 metre rapid fire pistol	527-07x	15	—N/a		Did not advance	
Romeo Cruz Lemus	10 metre air pistol	548-07x	29	—N/a		Did not advance	
Kenny Matta	10 metre air rifle	Disqualified		—N/a		Did not advance	
Marlon Perez Rodriguez	50 metre rifle prone	612.2	16	—N/a		Did not advance	
Sergio Sánchez	50 metre pistol	516-05x	22	—N/a		Did not advance	
Sergio Sánchez	25 metre rapid fire pistol	539-09x	13	—N/a		Did not advance	
Octavio Sandoval	50 metre rifle three positions	1142-38x	10	—N/a		Did not advance	
Octavio Sandoval	50 metre rifle prone	612.7	14	—N/a		Did not advance	
Octavio Sandoval	10 metre air rifle	608.5	11	—N/a		Did not advance	
Juan Schaeffer	Skeet	119	8	Did not advance			
Rodrigo Zachrisson	Skeet	119	7	Did not advance			

Women

Athlete	Event	Qualification		Semifinal		Final	
Athlete	Event	Points	Rank	Points	Rank	Points	Rank
Delmi Cruz	25 metre pistol	558-14x	13	Did not advance			
Delmi Cruz	10 metre air pistol	367-07x	15	—N/a		Did not advance	
Maria Guerra	50 metre rifle three positions	565-23x	13	—N/a		Did not advance	
Maria Guerra	10 metre air rifle	402.4	18	—N/a		Did not advance	
Lucia Menendez	25 metre pistol	565-11x	10	Did not advance			
Lucia Menendez	10 metre air pistol	364-03x	18	—N/a		Did not advance	
Andrea Romero	Skeet	66	3 Q	11	5	Did not advance	
Ana Soto	Trap	50	9	Did not advance			
Diana Velasco	50 metre rifle three positions	565-18x	15	—N/a		Did not advance	
Polymaria Velasquez	10 metre air rifle	399.8	24	—N/a		Did not advance	

== Swimming ==
Guatemala qualified eight swimmers (three men and five women).

Key

- Note – Ranks given are for the entire round
- FA = Qualified for the A Final
- FB = Qualified for the B Final
- DNS = Did not start

Men

Athlete	Event	Heat		Final	
Athlete	Event	Time	Rank	Time	Rank
Luis Martínez	100 m backstroke	57.22	12 FB	57.30	12
Luis Martínez	100 m butterfly	52.90	12 FA	52.75	8
Luis Martínez	200 m freestyle	1:51.79	15 FB	1:53.39	16
Yilberth Duarte Garcia	10 km open water	—N/a		2:20:30.2	17
Emilio Avila Sun	10 km open water	—N/a		2:19:14.7	16

*Note: Peruvian swimmer Mauricio Fiol was suspended by his team and pulled from the A final of the 100 meter butterfly for testing positive for stanozolol. Therefore, Luis Martinez was able to swim in the A final.

Women

Athlete	Event	Heat		Final	
Athlete	Event	Time	Rank	Time	Rank
Valerie Gruest	200 m butterfly	2:13.87	7 FA	2:14.03	8
Valerie Gruest	800 m freestyle	—N/a		8:55.62	12
Gisela Morales	100 m backstroke	1:00.99	6 FA	1:01.31	7
Gisela Morales	200 m backstroke	2:12.38	6 FA	2:13.18	6
Gabriela Santis	200 m freestyle	2:05.37	15 FB	2:03.94	14
Gabriela Santis	400 m freestyle	4:24.73	14 FB	4:16.79	10
Cindy Toscano Merida	10 km open water	—N/a		2:14:45.6	15
Fernanda Archila Salazar	10 km open water	—N/a		2:26:55.0	17

== Synchronized swimming ==
Guatemala qualified a duet. The team originally did not qualify, but after Puerto Rico declined its quota earned at the 2014 Central American and Caribbean Games in Veracruz, Mexico, the country was allowed to enter a duet as the first reserve. The duet ended up finishing in last place.

Athlete	Event	Technical Routine		Free Routine (Final)			
Athlete	Event	Points	Rank	Points	Rank	Total points	Rank
Joceline Acabal; Maria Castaneda	Women's duet	59.8423	12	59.6000	12	119.4423	12

== Table tennis ==
Guatemala has qualified a men's and women's team.

Men

Athlete	Event	Group stage				First round	Second round	Quarterfinals	Semifinals	Final / BM	
Athlete	Event	Opposition Result	Opposition Result	Opposition Result	Rank	Opposition Result	Opposition Result	Opposition Result	Opposition Result	Opposition Result	Rank
Hector Gatica	Singles	Campos (CUB); L 0–4	Toranzos (PAR); L 0–4	Mina (ECU); L 1–4	4	Did not advance					
Heber Moscoso	Singles	Alto (ARG); L 0–4	Tápia (ECU); L 0–4	Wang (USA); L 2–4	4	Did not advance					
Jose Miguel Ramirez	Singles	Martinez (CUB); W 4–1	Madrid (MEX); L 1–4	Berrios (PUR); L 0–4	2	Gilabert (ARG); W 4–2	Mino (ECU); L 2–4	Did not advance			
Hector Gatica; Heber Moscoso; Jose Miguel Ramirez	Team	Canada; L 0–3	Puerto Rico; L 0–3	—N/a	3	—N/a		Did not advance			

Women

Athlete	Event	Group stage				Round of 32	Round of 16	Quarterfinals	Semifinals	Final / BM	
Athlete	Event	Opposition Result	Opposition Result	Opposition Result	Rank	Opposition Result	Opposition Result	Opposition Result	Opposition Result	Opposition Result	Rank
Mabelyn Enriquez	Singles	Ruano (COL); L 2–4	Serrano (MEX); L 0–4	Lorenzotti (URU); L 2–4	4	Did not advance					
Andrea Estrada	Singles	Silva (MEX); L 1–4	Wu (USA); L 0–4	Brito (DOM); L 1–4	4	Did not advance					
Andrea Montufar	Singles	Jimenez (CUB); L 0–4	Castellano (CHI); L 2–4	Zhang (CAN); L 0–4	4	Did not advance					
Mabelyn Enriquez; Andrea Estrada; Andrea Montufar	Team	Canada; L 2–3	Colombia; L 0–3	—N/a	3	—N/a		Did not advance			

== Taekwondo ==
Guatemala has qualified a team of five athletes (three men and two women).

Athlete	Event	Round of 16	Quarterfinals	Semifinals	Repechage	Final / BM	
Athlete	Event	Opposition Result	Opposition Result	Opposition Result	Opposition Result	Opposition Result	Rank
Francisco Palacios	Men's 58 kg	Mario Leal (VEN); L 5–8	Did not advance				
Andreas Zelaya	Men's 68 kg	Tosh van Dijk (SUR); L 9–10	Did not advance				
Guillermo Rodas	Men's 80 kg	Steven López (USA); L 4–12	Did not advance				
Elizabeth Zamora	Women's 49 kg	Charlotte Craig (USA); W 4–1	Victoria Stambaugh (PUR); W 4–3	Yania Aguirre (CUB); L 5–17	—N/a	Candelaria Martes (DOM); L 7–8	5
Coralia Abadia	Women's 57 kg	Yamicel Nunez (CUB); L 0–12	Did not advance				

== Tennis ==
Guatemala qualified three tennis players (two men and one woman).

Athlete	Event	Round of 64	Round of 32	Round of 16	Quarterfinals	Semifinals	Final / BM	
Athlete	Event	Opposition Score	Opposition Score	Opposition Score	Opposition Score	Opposition Score	Opposition Score	Rank
Christopher Díaz Figueroa	Men's singles	Sánchez (MEX); W 6–4, 6–2	Bagnis (ARG); L 2–6, 6–4, 3–6	Did not advance				
Wilfredo González	Men's singles	Patiño (MEX); W 6–3, 6–1	Dellien (BOL); L 6–7 ^{(5–7)}, 6–0, 1–6	Did not advance				
Andrea Weedon	Women's singles	—N/a	Chirico (BOL); L 6–7 ^{(4–7)}, 2–6	Did not advance				
Christopher Díaz Figueroa; Wilfredo González	Men's doubles	—N/a		Aubone / Novikov (USA); L 3–6, 2–6	Did not advance			
Christopher Díaz Figueroa; Andrea Weedon	Mixed doubles	—N/a		Dellien / Terán (BOL); L 6–4, 3–6, [9-11]	Did not advance			

== Triathlon ==
Guatemala qualified three triathletes players (one man and two women).

Athlete	Event	Swim (1.5 km)	Trans 1	Bike (40 km)	Trans 2	Run (10 km)	Total	Rank
Gerardo Vergara	Men's individual	19:12	0:21	58:02	0:21	39:41	1:57:39	27
Barbara Schoenfeld	Women's individual	21:51	0:56	1:05:09	0:24	42:45	2:11:07	24
Daniela Schoenfeld	Women's individual	21:56	0:51	1:05:11	0:27	39:56	2:08:23	22

== Water skiing ==
Guatemala received a reallocated quota spot in the water skiing competitions.

Men

Athlete	Event	Preliminary	Rank	Final	Rank
Andrew Dunlap	Slalom	No result	18	Did not advance	
Andrew Dunlap	Tricks	0	15	Did not advance	

== Weightlifting ==
Guatemala qualified a team of 4 athletes (2 men and 2 women). Guatemala's fourth athlete (Astrid Camposeco) tested positive for doping on May 23 (but results were determined only on July 9 when she was in Toronto and was disqualified before the games started. She was scheduled to compete in the women's +75 kg category.

Athlete	Event	Snatch		Clean & jerk		Total	Rank
Athlete	Event	Result	Rank	Result	Rank	Total	Rank
Oscar Valdizon	Men's 69 kg	125	8	157	8	282	8
Luis Hoil Mas	Men's +105 kg	155	4	182	4	337	4
Lesbia Cruz	Women's 63 kg	82	5	105	5	187	5

== Wrestling ==
Guatemala qualified one male athlete.

Men's freestyle

Athlete	Event	Preliminaries	Quarterfinals	Semifinals	Final / BM	Rank
Athlete	Event	Opposition Result	Opposition Result	Opposition Result	Opposition Result	Rank
Marbin Miranda	–65 kg	—N/a	Metcalf (USA); L 0–10	Did not advance	Gomez (PUR); L 0–10	5

== See also ==
- Guatemala at the 2016 Summer Olympics
