= Barbados at the 2015 Pan American Games =

- IOC code: BAR
- NOC: Barbados Olympic Association

in Toronto, Canada 10–26 July 2015
- Competitors: 29 in 10 sports
- Flag bearer (opening): Darian King
- Flag bearer (closing): Ramon Gittens
- Medals Ranked 20th: Gold 0 Silver 1 Bronze 2 Total 3

Pan American Games appearances (overview)
- 1963; 1967; 1971; 1975; 1979; 1983; 1987; 1991; 1995; 1999; 2003; 2007; 2011; 2015; 2019; 2023; 2027

Barbados competed at the 2015 Pan American Games in Toronto, Ontario, Canada from July 10 to 26, 2015.

A team of 29 athletes (18 men and 11 women) competing in 10 sports was announced by the Barbados Olympic Association on July 2, 2015. This marked a reduction of 23 athletes from the last edition of the games in 2011. This is primarily because both field hockey teams (which consisted of 32 athletes in 2011) failed to qualify. Tennis player Darian King was the flagbearer for the team during the opening ceremony.

== Competitors ==
The following table lists Barbados' delegation per sport and gender.

Sport	Men	Women	Total
Athletics	7	7	14
Badminton	1	1	2
Boxing	1	0	1
Equestrian	0	1	1
Golf	1	0	1
Shooting	1	1	2
Swimming	2	1	3
Tennis	3	0	3
Triathlon	1	0	1
Weightlifting	1	0	1
Total	18	11	29

== Medalists ==
The following competitors from Barbados won medals at the games. In the by discipline sections below, medalists' names are bolded.

Medal	Name	Sport	Event	Date
Silver	Ramon Gittens	Athletics	Men's 100m	July 22
Bronze	Akela Jones	Athletics	Women's high jump	July 22
Bronze	Shane Brathwaite	Athletics	Men's 100m hurdles	July 24

**Medals by sport**
**Sport**	1st place, gold medalist(s)	2nd place, silver medalist(s)	3rd place, bronze medalist(s)	**Total**
Athletics	0	1	2	3
**Total**	**0**	**1**	**2**	**3**

**Medals by day**
**Day**	1st place, gold medalist(s)	2nd place, silver medalist(s)	3rd place, bronze medalist(s)	**Total**
July 22	0	1	1	2
July 24	0	0	1	1
**Total**	**0**	**1**	**2**	**3**

**Medals by gender**
**Gender**	1st place, gold medalist(s)	2nd place, silver medalist(s)	3rd place, bronze medalist(s)	**Total**
Male	0	1	1	2
Female	0	0	1	1
**Total**	**0**	**1**	**2**	**3**

== Athletics ==
Barbados qualified 14 athletes (seven of each gender) down from an initial list of 18, after organizers had to reduce team sizes to the quota of 680 athletes.

Key

- Note–Ranks given for track events are for the entire round
- **Q** = Qualified for the next round
- **q** = Qualified for the next round as a fastest loser or, in field events, by position without achieving the qualifying target
- **NR** = National record
- **PB** = Personal best
- **SB** = Seasonal best
- **DSQ** = Disqualified
- N/A = Round not applicable for the event

Men

Athlete	Event	Round 1		Semifinal		Final	
Athlete	Event	Result	Rank	Result	Rank	Result	Rank
Levi Cadogan	100 m	10.18	=13 **Q**	10.16 **q**	8	10.18	8
**Ramon Gittens**	100 m	10.03	4 **Q**	10.15 **SB**	=6 **Q**	10.07 **SB**	2nd place, silver medalist(s)
Burkheart Ellis	200 m	20.70	17	did not advance			
**Shane Brathwaite**	110 m hurdles	—N/a		13.36	2 **Q**	13.21	3rd place, bronze medalist(s)
Greggmar Swift	110 m hurdles	—N/a		13.40	3 **Q**	13.28	4
Shane Brathwaite; Mario Burke; Levi Cadogan; Nicholas Deshong; Burkheart Ellis	4 × 100 metres relay	—N/a		38.65 **NR**	5 **Q**	38.79	5

Women

Athlete	Event	Round 1		Semifinal		Final	
Athlete	Event	Result	Rank	Result	Rank	Result	Rank
Sonia Gaskin	800 m	—N/a		2:09.01	12	did not advance	
Kierre Beckles	100 m hurdles	—N/a		13.14	10 **Q**	13.24	7
Akela Jones	100 m hurdles	—N/a		13.10	8	did not advance	
Tia-Adana Belle; Nadia Cummins; Sonia Gaskin; Sade Sealy; Sada Williams	4 × 400 metres relay	—N/a		3:31.72 **SB**	7 **Q**	**DSQ**	

Field events

Athlete	Event	Final	
Athlete	Event	Distance	Position
**Akela Jones**	High jump	1.91	3rd place, bronze medalist(s)
**Akela Jones**	Long jump	6.60 **PB**	6

== Badminton ==
Barbados qualified a team of two athletes (one man and one woman).

Athlete	Event	First round	Round of 32	Round of 16	Quarterfinals	Semifinals	Final	Rank
Athlete	Event	Opposition Result	Opposition Result	Opposition Result	Opposition Result	Opposition Result	Opposition Result	Rank
Dakeil Thorpe	Men's singles	Bye	Humblers (GUA); **L** (5–21, 7–21)	did not advance				
Sabrina Scott	Women's singles	Bye	Haramara (MEX); **L** (3–21, 11–21)	did not advance				
Dakeil Thorpe; Sabrina Scott	Mixed doubles	—N/a	Azcuy Perez / Reyes (CUB); **L** (13–21, 22–24)	did not advance				

== Boxing ==
Barbados qualified one male boxer.

Men

Athlete	Event	Preliminaries	Quarterfinals	Semifinals	Final
Athlete	Event	Opposition Result	Opposition Result	Opposition Result	Opposition Result
Adrian Biscette	Light heavyweight (81kg)	Mina (ECU); **L** TKO	did not advance		

== Equestrian ==
Barbados qualified one athlete.

Jumping

Athlete	Horse	Event	Ind. Round 1		Ind. Round 2			Ind. Round 3			Final					
Athlete	Horse	Event	Ind. Round 1		Ind. Round 2			Ind. Round 3			Round A		Round B		Total	
Athlete	Horse	Event	Penalties	Rank	Penalties	Total	Rank	Penalties	Total	Rank	Penalties	Rank	Penalties	Rank	Penalties	Rank
Emily Kinch	Teddy du Bosquetiau	Individual	12	48	21	33	47	13	60	39	did not advance					

== Golf ==
Barbados qualified one golfer.

Men

Athlete	Event	Final						
Athlete	Event	Round 1	Round 2	Round 3	Round 4	Total	To Par	Rank
James Johnson	Individual	79	76	72	71	298	+10	22

== Shooting ==
Barbados qualified two shooters.

Athlete	Event	Qualification		Final	
Athlete	Event	Score	Rank	Score	Rank
Michael Maskell	Men's Skeet	121	13	did not advance	
Michelle Elliot	Women's Skeet	48	9	did not advance	

== Swimming ==
Barbados qualified three swimmers.

Key

- Note – Ranks given for swimming events are for all heats
- **FB** = Qualified for the B Finals

Athlete	Event	Heat		Final	
Athlete	Event	Time	Rank	Time	Rank
Alex Sobers	Men's 100 m freestyle	52.92	20	did not advance	
Alex Sobers	Men's 200 m freestyle	1:53.11	17 **FB**	1:53.16	15
Alex Sobers	Men's 400 m freestyle	4:01.77	14 **FB**	4:00.25	15
Christopher Courtis	Men's 100 m Backstroke	58.15	15	57.93	15
Christopher Courtis	Men's 200 m Backstroke	2:09.73	20	did not advance	
Christopher Courtis	Men's 200 m Individual Medley	2:12.33	19	did not advance	
Lani Cabrera	Women's 200 m freestyle	2:07.41	17	did not advance	
Lani Cabrera	Women's 400 m freestyle	4:29.46	17	did not advance	
Lani Cabrera	Women's 800 m freestyle	—N/a		9:16.88	16

== Tennis ==
Barbados qualified three male athletes.

Men

Athlete	Event	1st Round	Round of 32	Round of 16	Quarterfinals	Semifinals	Bronze medal/Final	
Athlete	Event	Opposition Score	Opposition Score	Opposition Score	Opposition Score	Opposition Score	Opposition Score	Rank
Darian King	Singles	Bye	Schnur (CAN); **L** (2–6, 4–6)	did not advance				
Haydn Lewis	Singles	Bye	Podlipnik Castillo (CHI); **L** (1–6, 1–6)	did not advance				
Seanon Williams	Singles	Arus (URU); **L** (6–7, 6–7)	did not advance					
Darian King; Haydn Lewis	Doubles	—N/a		Martinez / Rodriguez Pace (VEN); **W** (7–6, 6–1)	Hach / Patiño (MEX); **W** (7–5, 7–5)	Andreozzi / Bagnis (ARG); **L** (6–3, 4–6, 10–8)	Escobar / Gómez (ECU); **L** (3–6, 0–6)	4

== Triathlon ==
Barbados qualified one male triathlete.

Men

Athlete	Event	Swim (1.5 km)	Trans 1	Bike (40 km)	Trans 2	Run (10 km)	Total	Rank
Jason Wilson	Individual	18:53	0:23	58:22	0:22	31:17	1:49.19	5

== Weightlifting ==
Barbados received one wildcard.

Men

Athlete	Event	Snatch		Clean & Jerk		Total	Rank
Athlete	Event	Result	Rank	Result	Rank	Total	Rank
Brian Best	Men's 77 kg	115	11	DNF			

== See also ==
- Barbados at the 2015 Parapan American Games
- Barbados at the 2016 Summer Olympics
