= Sobeys Stadium =

Tennis stadium in Toronto

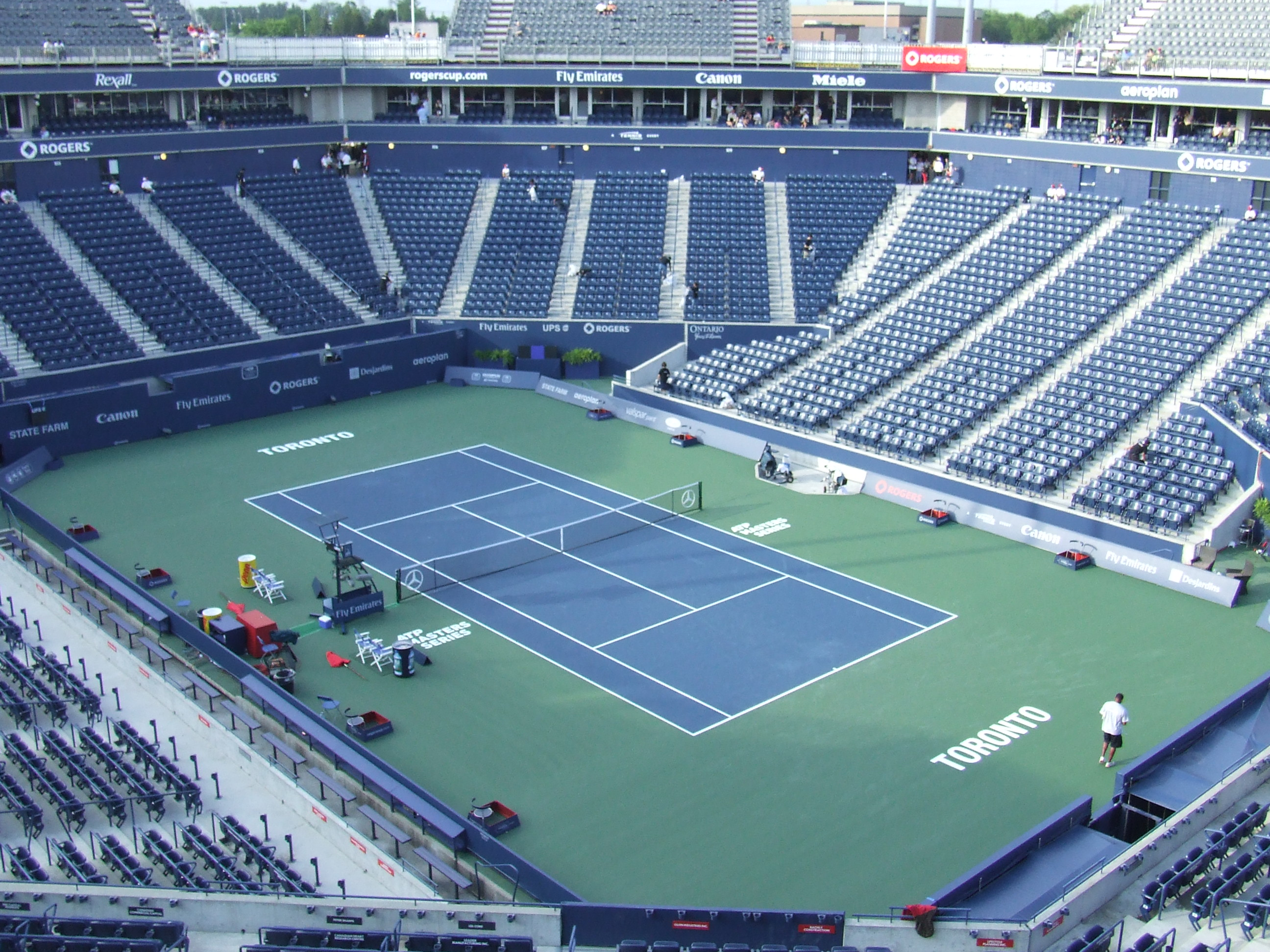

- Location in Toronto Location in Ontario Location in Canada
- Former names: Rexall Centre (2004–2015); Aviva Centre (2015–2022)
- Address: 1 Shoreham Drive
- Location: Toronto, Ontario, Canada
- Coordinates: 43°46′17.60″N 79°30′43.40″W
- Owner: Tennis Canada
- Capacity: 12,500 (Stadium Court); 11,000–14,000 (concerts)
- Surface: Hard, Outdoors
- Field size: 28,240 m^{2}
- Public transit: Pioneer Village station

Construction
- Built: 2004
- Cost: US$ 45 million
- Architects: Robbie Young & Wright Architects Inc.
- Project managers: O.P. McCarthy & Associates Inc.

Tenants
- National Bank Open (men) (ATP 1000) 2004–present National Bank Open (women) (WTA 1000) 2004–present 2015 Pan American Games

Website
- https://sobeysstadium.com/

Sobeys Stadium, formerly Rexall Centre and Aviva Centre, is a tennis stadium in Toronto, Ontario, Canada, located on the grounds of York University's Keele Campus. The 12,500-capacity Stadium Court is the largest stadium at the tennis complex. Sobeys Stadium is the venue for the National Bank Open, a professional tournament on the ATP Tour and WTA circuits, held annually. Beginning 2021, Sobeys Stadium hosts the men's tournament in odd-numbered years and the women's event in even-numbered years, with the other gender's event held in Montreal in those years. The facility also is a year-round tennis training facility. The main stadium is occasionally used for seasonal concerts.

== Description ==
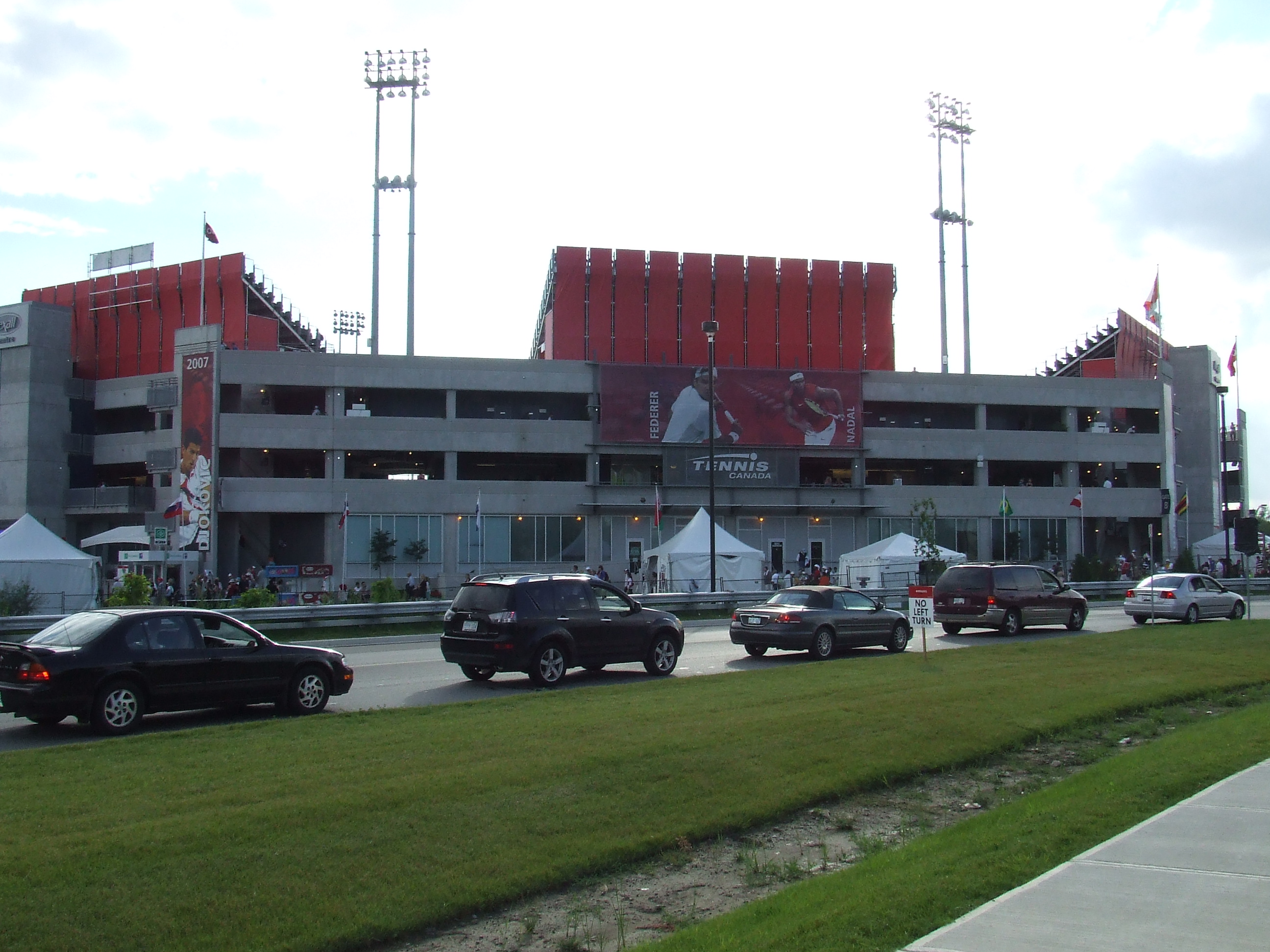
The exterior of Sobeys Stadium.

Built in 2004, the main venue holds 12,500 spectators. There are 11 other small courts next to the stadium. All twelve courts use the DecoTurf cushioned acrylic surface, the same surface as the US Open Tennis Championships. The stadium has 39 executive suites and two party suites.

Sobeys Stadium is also the home of the Toronto offices of Tennis Canada and the Ontario Tennis Association. The grounds serve as the national and provincial tennis training centre year-round, offering 16 courts (eight of which are indoors). The stadium is also used for the staging of interuniversity competitions and practices and winter training. During the academic year, a discounted fee on indoor courts is offered to York students weekdays during daytime hours. This is the venue for York University's Convocation Ceremony every year.

== History ==
The stadium was built to replace the National Tennis Centre, which was demolished in 2003. The facility opened on July 26, 2004 as the Rexall Centre in a naming rights deal with the Rexall pharmacy chain. The first match at the stadium was an opening round match between Andre Agassi and Tommy Haas attended by 10,500. It is one of two venues for the Canadian Open, alternating hosting the men's and women's events annually with IGA Stadium in Montreal.

In 2011, the stadium became the venue for the BlackCreek Summer Music Festival, a series of concerts of jazz, opera, popular and symphonic music.

In 2014, the venue was named as the host of the tennis events at the 2015 Pan American Games.

In 2015, the venue was renamed the Aviva Centre after reaching a new naming rights deal with British multinational insurance company Aviva.

In 2017, Aviva Centre hosted the opening ceremonies for the 2017 North American Indigenous Games.

In 2022, the stadium was renamed Sobeys Stadium after Canadian supermarket chain Sobeys acquired the naming rights to the venue, giving Empire Company naming rights to both major Tennis Canada venues (the Montreal stadium had been named after its IGA brand since 2018).

In 2024, Sobeys Stadium launched its first summer concert series, The Bowl at Sobeys Stadium, including artists such as Kevin Hart, Barenaked Ladies, Milky Chance and Shaggy. The concert series is to be held again in 2026 with artists including Interpol, Mother Mother, Undertale and others. /

=== Mystery tunnel ===
In February 2015, Toronto Police Service announced the discovery of a "mystery" tunnel located a few hundred metres from the facility, a story which later became popular. It was later revealed to be a "man cave." The two men in their mid-20s who excavated the cave had no criminal intent and are not affiliated with York University, Rexall Centre (as it was then called), or the Pan Am Games, and the tunnel was created as a hobby. The Toronto Sun identified one of the men as 22-year-old Elton McDonald. He faced an $800 fine instead of receiving a criminal record. McDonald's employer said that he borrowed and lost his tools used to dig the tunnel.

== Location and access ==
Sobeys Stadium is located at the intersection of Shoreham Drive and Pond Road on the northwestern edge of the York University campus, southeast of the intersection of Jane Street and Steeles Avenue West. To the west of the facility are forested park lands along the Black Creek. The Saywell Woods and Stong Pond are located to the south and east of the facility.

There are an estimated 7,000 parking spaces in the vicinity. Pioneer Village subway station of Line 1 Yonge–University is situated a short walk from the stadium or transit users can take the 106 Sentinel bus between the stadium and the subway station.

== See also ==
- Venues of the 2015 Pan American and Parapan American Games
- List of tennis stadiums by capacity
