= 2026 UCI Mountain Bike season =

Mountain Bike season

Details
- Dates: 14 January –
- Location: World

The 2026 UCI Mountain Bike season is the 21st season of the UCI Mountain Bike season. The 2026 season began on 14 January with UCI Mountain Bike Continental Series – Thailand Mountain Bike Cup XCO and ends in December 2026.

== Events ==
=== Continental Series (CS) ===
Date	Race Name	Location	Class	Winner	Second	Third	Ref
14 January	UCI Mountain Bike Continental Series – Thailand Mountain Bike Cup XCO	(Thailand) Kanchanaburi	CS	Riki Kitabayashi (JPN); Sayu Bella Sukma Dewi (INA)	Zaenal Fanani (INA); Yui Ishida (JPN)	Ihza Muhammad (INA); Tatyana Geneleva (KAZ)	
16–18 January	UCI Mountain Bike Continental Series – MTBNZ National Series Race 1 – Bike Methven – DHI	(New Zealand) Methven	CS	Oli Clark (NZL); Kate Hastings (NZL)	Joe Millington (NZL); Sacha Mills (AUS)	Zachariah Bradley-Hudson (AUS); Bellah Birchall (NZL)	
24 January	UCI Mountain Bike Continental Series – MTBNZ National Series Race 1 – Christchurch Singletrack – XCO	(New Zealand) Christchurch	CS	Anton Cooper (NZL); Rebecca Henderson (AUS)	Sam Gaze (NZL); Mary Gray (NZL)	Pierrick Burnet (FRA); Amélie MacKay (NZL)	
25 January	UCI Mountain Bike Continental Series – MTBNZ National Series Race 2 – Christchurch Singletrack	(New Zealand) Christchurch	CS	Anton Cooper (NZL); Rebecca Henderson (AUS)	Sam Gaze (NZL); Mary Gray (NZL)	Pierrick Burnet (FRA); Sarah Tucknott (AUS)	
30 January – 1 February	UCI Mountain Bike Continental Series – International Cup XCO Valdivia Bikefest – Round 2	(Chile) Valdivia	CS	Martín Vidaurre (CHI) (XCC); Haley Batten (USA) (XCC); Martín Vidaurre (CHI) (XCO); Haley Batten (USA) (XCO)	Alex Malacarne (BRA) (XCC); Raiza Goulão (BRA) (XCC); Alex Malacarne (BRA) (XCO); Raiza Goulão (BRA) (XCO)	Gustavo Xavier de Oliveira (BRA) (XCC); Florencia Monsálvez (CHI) (XCC); Fernando Contreras (ARG) (XCO); Yarela González (CHI) (XCO)	
19–22 February	UCI Mountain Bike Continental Series – Crankworx – Christchurch Downhill	(New Zealand) Christchurch	CS	Luke Meier-Smith (AUS); Jenna Hastings (NZL)	Lachlan Stevens-McNab (NZL); Ellie Hulsebosch (NZL)	Finn Iles (CAN); Sian A'Hern (AUS)	
25 February	UCI Mountain Bike Continental Series – American Continental Series Salinas – XCO	(Puerto Rico) Salinas	CS	Riley Amos (USA); Savilia Blunk (USA)	Gunnar Holmgren (CAN); Madigan Munro (USA)	Gerardo Ulloa (COL); Giuliana Salvini Morgen (BRA)	
28 February	UCI Mountain Bike Continental Series – MTB XCO	(Australia) Canberra	CS	Toby Stewart (AUS); Rebecca Henderson (AUS)	Cameron Ivory (AUS); Sarah Tucknott (AUS)	Tatsuumi Soejima (JPN); Amélie Mackay (NZL)	
28 February – 1 March	UCI Mountain Bike Continental Series - XCO Vila de Melgaço	(Portugal) Melgaço	CS	Simone Avondetto (ITA); Sofie Heby Pedersen (DEN)	Juri Zanotti (ITA); Chiara Teocchi (ITA)	David List (GER); Giada Specia (ITA)	
28 February – 1 March	UCI Mountain Bike Continental Series - MTB DHI	(Australia) Falls Creek	CS	Jackson Connelly (AUS); Sacha Mills (AUS)	Zac Bradley-Hudson (AUS); Zali Miklas (AUS)	Hudson Tarling (AUS); Bella Schofield (AUS)	
1 March	UCI Mountain Bike Continental Series - MTB XCO	(Australia) Canberra	CS	Reece Tucknott (AUS); Rebecca Henderson (AUS)	Cameron Ivory (AUS); Sarah Tucknott (AUS)	Toby Stewart (AUS); Mary Gray (NZL)	
14–15 March	UCI Mountain Bike Continental Series - XCO Continental Series	(Brazil) Paraíba do Sul	CS	Ulan Bastos Galinski (BRA) (XCC); Raiza Goulão (BRA) (XCC); Ulan Bastos Galinski (BRA) (XCO); Raiza Goulão (BRA) (XCO)	Alex Malacarne (BRA) (XCC); Hercília Najara (BRA) (XCC); Jose Gabriel Marques (BRA) (XCO); Karen Olímpio (BRA) (XCO)	Jose Gabriel Marques (BRA) (XCC); Luiza Cocuzzi (BRA) (XCC); Nicolas Rafhael Amancio (BRA) (XCO); Giuliana Salvini Morgen (BRA) (XCO)	
25–28 March	UCI Mountain Bike Continental Series - Monster Energy Pro Downhill Series - Rock Creek	(United States) Zirconia	CS	Luca Shaw (USA); Anna Newkirk (USA)	Kenneth Pinkerton (USA); Matilda Melton (USA)	Asa Vermette (USA); Kailey Skelton (USA)	
28–29 March	UCI Mountain Bike Continental Series - Fullgaz Race Powered by Ghost - XCO	(Germany) Obergessertshausen	CS	Finn Treudler (SUI); Sina Frei (SUI)	Lars Forster (SUI); Laura Stigger (AUT)	Vital Albin (SUI); Jolanda Neff (SUI)	
10–12 April	UCI Mountain Bike Continental Series - DHI Continental Series	(Brazil) Niterói	CS	Bruno Da Silva Pinto (BRA); Nara Faria (BRA)	Tyler Ervin (USA); Larissa Holscher da Luz (BRA)	Caio Vieira Werneck (BRA); Daniela Oliveira Araujo (BRA)	
10–12 April	UCI Mountain Bike Continental Series - iXS European Downhill Cup - Santiago de Besteiros	(Portugal) Besteiros	CS	Jordan Williams (GBR); Jenna Hastings (NZL)	Max Hartenstern (GER); Siel van der Velden (BEL)	Finn Iles (CAN); Eleonora Farina (ITA)	
11 April	UCI Mountain Bike Continental Series - Towerbos XC Dirt Festival	(Namibia) Windhoek	CS	Michael Foster (RSA); Candice Lill (RSA)	Luca Ruwiel (RSA); Naama Noyman (ISR)	Tomer Zaltsman (ISR); Only two elite riders	
18 April	UCI Mountain Bike Continental Series - XCO Drozdovo	(Slovakia) Nová Baňa	CS	Mario Bair (AUT); Isla Short (GBR)	Max Foidl (AUT); Sina van Thiel (GER)	Maximilian Brandl (GER); Giada Specia (ITA)	
18 April	UCI Mountain Bike Continental Series - MTB XCO	(Australia) Cairns	CS	Anton Cooper (NZL); Rebecca Henderson (AUS)	Jonathon Noble (AUS); Sarah Tucknott (AUS)	Baily Devantier-Thomas (AUS); Hilary Bell (CAN)	
18–19 April	UCI Mountain Bike Continental Series - MTB DHI	(Australia) Cairns	CS	Joel Sutherland (AUS); Sacha Mills (AUS)	William Hynes (AUS); Cassie Voysey (AUS)	Jed Stanton (AUS); Tracy Esterhuyzen (AUS)	
19 April	UCI Mountain Bike Continental Series - MTB XCO	(Australia) Cairns	CS	Anton Cooper (NZL); Rebecca Henderson (AUS)	Jonathon Noble (AUS); Sarah Tucknott (AUS)	Daniel Lucas (AUS); Hilary Bell (CAN)	
25–26 April	UCI Mountain Bike Continental Series - American Series DHI Perú	(Peru) Urubamba	CS	Gonzalo Gajdosech (ARG); Catalina Calderón (ARG)	Tyler Ervin (USA); Larissa Holscher da Luz (BRA)	Brener Montes Tolentino (PER); Katie Holden (USA)	
25–26 April	UCI Mountain Bike Continental Series - SA XCO Cup Series	(South Africa) Gauteng	CS	Michael Foster (RSA); Candice Lill (RSA)	Tomer Zaltsman (ISR); Naama Noyman (ISR)	Johann van Zyl (RSA); Stacey Hyslop (ZIM)	
8–9 May	UCI Mountain Bike Continental Series - Englewood Open P/B Trek XC	(United States) Fall River	CS	Logan Sadesky (CAN); Suheily Rodríguez (PUR)	Owen Clark (CAN); Coral Ramírez (PUR)	Austin Beard (USA); Emma Schwab (USA)	
9–10 May	UCI Mountain Bike Continental Series - Gothenburg MTB Race - XCO	(Sweden) Gothenburg	CS	Sebastian Fini Carstensen (DEN); Caroline Bohé (DEN)	Knut Røhme (NOR); Janika Lõiv (EST)	Mathis Guay (FRA); Oda Laforce (NOR)	
15–17 May	UCI Mountain Bike Continental Series - iXS European Downhill Cup Fort William	(United Kingdom) Fort William	CS	Charlie Hatton (GBR); Harriet Harnden (GBR)	Noa Hirst Walker (GBR); Mille Johnset (NOR)	Reece Wilson (GBR); Emily Carrick-Anderson (GBR)	
16–17 May	UCI Mountain Bike Continental Series - American Series Costa Rica XCO	(Costa Rica) San José	CS	Jose Gabriel Marques (BRA); Giuliana Salvini Morgen (BRA)	Jhonnatan Botero Villegas (COL); Suheily Rodríguez (PUR)	Jerónimo Bedoya (COL); Adriana Maria Rojas (CRC)	
23–24 May	UCI Mountain Bike Continental Series - Coupe de Japon MTB Yawatahama International MTB Race	(Japan) Yawatahama	CS	Riki Kitabayashi (JPN); Liang Zhenglan (CHN)	Tatsuumi Soejima (JPN); Wu Zhifan (CHN)	Toki Sawada (JPN); Ying Lei (CHN)	
30 May	UCI Mountain Bike Continental Series - Triada MTB Cheile Grădiștei - XCO	(Romania) Moieciu	CS	Vlad Dascălu (ROU); Finja Lipp (GER)	Oleksandr Hudyma (UKR); Estíbaliz Sagardoy (ESP)	Agustín Durán (ARG); Núria Bosch (ESP)	
6 June	UCI Mountain Bike Continental Series - Asia Mountain Bike Series - Kabibo Banjak Alegria	(Philippines) Alegria	CS	Tatsuumi Soejima (JPN); Yui Ishida (JPN)	Adrian Nacario (PHI); Shagne Paula Yaoyao (PHI)	Kohei Yamamoto (JPN); Phi Kun Pan (MAS)	
6–7 June	UCI Mountain Bike Continental Series - iXS European Downhill Cup La Molina	(Spain) La Molina	CS	Luke Williamson (GBR); Isabeau Courdurier (FRA)	Johan Garcin (FRA); Laïs Bonnaure (FRA)	Daniel Castellanos (ESP); Luana Cherecheș (ROU)	
7 June	UCI Mountain Bike Continental Series - Guatemala DHI	(Guatemala) Antigua	CS	Henry Sherry (CAN); No Elite	Camilo Sánchez (COL); No Elite	Juan Martínez Revolorio (GUA); No Elite	
13 June	UCI Mountain Bike Continental Series - Canmore MTB Classic	(Canada) Canmore	CS	Adair Prieto (MEX); Raiza Goulão (BRA)	Logan Sadesky (CAN); Ana Maria Roa (COL)	Ivan Sippy (USA); Suheily Rodríguez (PUR)	
27–28 June	UCI Mountain Bike Continental Series - MTB French Cup - DHI	(France) Les Deux Alpes	CS	Kimi Viardot (FRA); Laïs Bonnaure (FRA)	Johan Garcin (FRA); Vicky Clavel (FRA)	Antoine Rogge (FRA); Siel van der Velden (BEL)	
24–26 July	UCI Mountain Bike Continental Series - Asia Mountain Bike Series - Zunyi - XCO	(China) Zunyi	CS	Lü Xianjing (CHN); Wu Zhifan (CHN)	Chen Keyu (CHN); Liang Zhenglan (CHN)	Gao Yongbing (CHN); Tatyana Geneleva (KAZ)	
24–26 July	UCI Mountain Bike Continental Series - MTB French Cup - XCO	(France) Puy-Saint-Vincent	CS	Jordan Sarrou (FRA); Emeline Detilleux (FRA)	Luke Wiedmann (SUI); Léna Gérault (FRA)	Antoine Philipp (FRA); Loana Lecomte (FRA)	
31 July – 2 August	UCI Mountain Bike Continental Series - iXS European Downhill Cup - Szczyrk	(Poland) Szczyrk	CS	Riko Mäeuibo (EST); Kate Hastings (NZL)	Ian Guionnet (FRA); Kerstin Sallegger (AUT)	Zac Bradley-Hudson (AUS); Catalina Calderón (ARG)	
7–9 August	UCI Mountain Bike Continental Series - Crankworx - Silverstar Bike Park Downhill - DHI	(Canada) Silver Star Mountain Resort	CS	Luke Meier-Smith (AUS); Mille Johnset (NOR)	Tegan Cruz (CAN); Maylei Leaneagh (AUS)	Seth Sherlock (CAN); Sian A'Hern (AUS)	
20–23 August	UCI Mountain Bike Continental Series - Siol International Mountain Bike Challenge - XCO/DHI	(Malaysia) Kuching	CS	Tatsuumi Soejima (JPN) (XCO); Tsai Ya-yu (TPE) (XCO); Chiang Sheng-shan (TPE) (DHI); Naomi Gardoce (PHI) (DHI)	Denis Sergiyenko (KAZ) (XCO); Maria Sherstiuk (UKR) (XCO); Alden Comeros (PHI) (DHI); Chu En-tzu (TPE) (DHI)	Ihza Muhammad (INA) (XCO); Yui Ishida (JPN) (XCO); Luke Allan Wong (SIN) (DHI); Ariana Nurminda Arifin (MAS) (DHI)	
11–13 September	UCI Mountain Bike Continental Series - iXS European Downhill Cup Verbier	(Switzerland) Verbier	CS	Yannick Baechler (SUI); Lisa Baumann (SUI)	Johan Garcin (FRA); Kerstin Sallegger (AUT)	Antoine Rogge (FRA); Elise Porta (FRA)	
27–29 November	UCI Mountain Bike Continental Series - DHI Araucania	(Chile) Temuco	CS				

=== Hors Class (HC) ===
Date	Race Name	Location	Class	Winner	Second	Third	Ref
14–15 February	Internacionales Chelva	(Spain) Chelva	HC	Luca Schwarzbauer (GER); Anne Terpstra (NED)	Luca Martin (FRA); Evie Richards (GBR)	Luke Moir (RSA); Gwendalyn Gibson (USA)	
20–22 February	Tropical Mountain Bike Challenge	(Puerto Rico) Salinas	HC	Gerardo Ulloa (MEX) (XCC); Giuliana Salvini Morgen (BRA) (XCC); Gerardo Ulloa (MEX) (XCO); Savilia Blunk (USA) (XCO)	Riley Amos (USA) (XCC); Madigan Munro (USA) (XCC); Riley Amos (USA) (XCO); Madigan Munro (USA) (XCO)	Alex Malacarne (BRA) (XCC); Ingrid McElroy (USA) (XCC); Alex Malacarne (BRA) (XCO); Ella Myers (CAN) (XCO)	
21–22 February	Shimano Supercup Massi Banyoles	(Spain) Banyoles	HC	Victor Koretzky (FRA); Nicole Koller (SUI)	Dario Lillo (SUI); Valentina Corvi (ITA)	Luca Schwarzbauer (GER); Kelsey Urban (USA)	
20–21 March	US Pro Cup	(United States) Fayetteville	HC	Christopher Blevins (USA) (XCC); Haley Batten (USA) (XCC); Riley Amos (USA) (XCO); Gwendalyn Gibson (USA) (XCO)	Riley Amos (USA) (XCC); Gwendalyn Gibson (USA) (XCC); Gunnar Holmgren (CAN) (XCO); Haley Batten (USA) (XCO)	Carter Woods (CAN) (XCC); Rafaëlle Carrier (CAN) (XCC); Carter Woods (CAN) (XCO); Madigan Munro (USA) (XCO)	
22 March	Skoda Swiss Bike Cup - Rivera (Tamaro Trophy)	(Switzerland) Rivera	HC	Mathias Flückiger (SUI); Ronja Blöchlinger (SUI)	Finn Treudler (SUI); Nicole Koller (SUI)	Fabio Püntener (SUI); Martina Berta (ITA)	
27–29 March	MTB French Cup - XCO/XCC/XCE	(France) Pernes-les-Fontaines	HC	Luca Martin (FRA) (XCC); Martina Berta (ITA) (XCC); Jordan Sarrou (FRA) (XCO); Martina Berta (ITA) (XCO); Lorenzo Serres (FRA) (XCE); Margaux Borrelly (FRA) (XCE)	Naël Rouffiac (FRA) (XCC); Ronja Eibl (GER) (XCC); Mathis Guay (FRA) (XCO); Isla Short (GBR) (XCO); Titouan Perrin-Ganier (FRA) (XCE); Loïs Philibert (FRA) (XCE)	Jordan Sarrou (FRA) (XCC); Vita Movrin (SVN) (XCC); Joshua Dubau (FRA) (XCO); Ronja Eibl (GER) (XCO); Killian Demangeon (FRA) (XCE); Madison Boissiere (FRA) (XCE)	
11 April	Marlene Südtirol Sunshine Race	(Italy) Nals	HC	Mathias Flückiger (SUI); Laura Stigger (AUT)	Lars Forster (SUI); Alessandra Keller (SUI)	Fabio Püntener (SUI); Nina Benz (GER)	
25–26 April	Ötztaler Mountainbike Festival	(Austria) Haiming	HC	Bjorn Riley (USA); Alessandra Keller (SUI)	Lars Forster (SUI); Ginia Caluori (SUI)	Mario Bair (AUT); Ramona Forchini (SUI)	
16–17 May	International MTB Bundesliga - Heubacher Mountainbikefestival	(Germany) Heubach	HC	Adrien Boichis (FRA); Nina Graf (GER)	Julian Schelb (GER); Rebecca Henderson (AUS)	Maximilian Brandl (GER); Alessandra Keller (SUI)	
24 May	Roc Laissagais - XCM	(France) Laissac	HC	Frans Claes (BEL); Margot Moschetti (FRA)	Hans Becking (NED); Stefanie Zahno (SUI)	Axel Roudil (FRA); Sophie Borderes (FRA)	
30–31 May	MTB French Cup - XCO	(France) Saint-Quentin-en-Yvelines	HC	Naël Rouffiac (FRA); Loana Lecomte (FRA)	Joshua Dubau (FRA); Catalina Vidaurre (CHI)	Yannis Musy (FRA); Vita Movrin (SLO)	
28 June	Bike Revolution #1	(Switzerland) Davos	HC	Luca Schätti (SUI); Ramona Forchini (SUI)	Luke Wiedmann (SUI); Seraina Leugger (SUI)	Julian Schelb (GER); Ella MacPhee (CAN)	
4 July	MB Race - XCM	(France) Combloux	HC	Tim Smeenge (NED); Camille Udny (FRA)	Frans Claes (BEL); Léa Mouzon (FRA)	Micha Klötzli (SUI); Anne Claire Defix (FRA)	
21–22 August	Grand Raid BCVS	(Switzerland) Verbier–Grimentz	HC	Martin Fanger (SUI); Paula Gorycka (POL)	Urs Huber (SUI); Margot Moschetti (FRA)	Tristan Arioli (FRA); Alessia Nay (SUI)	
4–7 September	Crankworx - Mont-Saint-Anne Canada Cup - DHI/XCC/XCO	(Canada) Mont-Sainte-Anne	HC	Logan Sadesky (CAN) (XCC); Jennifer Jackson (CAN) (XCC); Tegan Cruz (CAN) (DHI); Mille Johnset (CAN) (DHI); Logan Sadesky (CAN) (XCO); Jennifer Jackson (CAN) (XCO)	Mika Comaniuk (CAN) (XCC); Marin Lowe (CAN) (XCC); Dane Jewett (CAN) (DHI); Taylor Ostgaard (USA) (DHI); Owen Clark (CAN) (XCO); Marin Lowe (CAN) (XCO)	Ivan Sippy (CAN) (XCC); Léa Bouchard (CAN) (XCC); Tristan Lemire (CAN) (DHI); Isla O'Connor (CAN) (DHI); Carter Woods (CAN) (XCO); Emilly Johnston (CAN) (XCO)	
6 September	Skoda Swiss Bike Cup - XCO	(Switzerland) Huttwil	HC	Fabio Püntener (SUI); Alessandra Keller (SUI)	Vital Albin (SUI); Nicole Koller (SUI)	Luca Schätti (SUI); Monique Halter (SUI)	
12 September	Skoda Swiss Bike Cup Gränichen	(Switzerland) Gränichen	HC	Luca Schätti (SUI); Nicole Koller (SUI)	Marcel Guerrini (SUI); Lia Schrievers (GER)	Joris Ryf (SUI); Noëlle Buri (SUI)	
19 September	La Forestiere - XCM	(France) La Pesse	HC	Alexandre Balmer (SUI); Léna Gérault (FRA)	Martin Fanger (SUI); Tatiana Tournut (FRA)	Simon Stiebjahn (GER); Margot Moschetti (FRA)	
4 October	Extreme Sur Loue - XCM	(France) Ornans	HC	Jakob Hartmann (GER); Anna Weinbeer (SUI)	Lorenzo Samparisi (ITA); Léna Gérault (FRA)	Martin Frey (GER); Tatiana Tournut (FRA)	
10–11 October	Serbia Epic Petrovaradin Fortress Bike Fest	(Serbia) Novi Sad	HC	Simone Avondetto (ITA); Lea Huber (SUI)	Mario Bair (AUT); Tatiana Saitarova	Alex Malacarne (BRA); Natalia Grzegorzewska (POL)	
11 October	Roc D'azur - XCM	(France) Fréjus	HC	Jordan Sarrou (FRA); Sammie Maxwell (NZL)	Cole Punchard (CAN); Léna Gérault (FRA)	Østen Brovold Midtsundstad (NOR); Ramona Forchini (SUI)	

=== Class 1 (1) ===
Date	Race Name	Location	Class	Winner	Second	Third	Ref
17 January	Momentum Medical Scheme Attakwas Extreme Presented By Biogen – XCM	(South Africa) Oudtshoorn	1	Alan Hatherly (RSA); Hayley Preen (RSA)	Marc Pritzen (RSA); Samantha Sanders (RSA)	Wessel Botha (RSA); Bianca Haw (RSA)	
28–30 January	International Cup XCO Valdivia Bikefest-Round 1	(Chile) Valdivia	1	Martín Vidaurre (CHI) (XCC); Haley Batten (USA) (XCC); Martín Vidaurre (CHI) (XCO); Haley Batten (USA) (XCO)	Alex Malacarne (BRA) (XCC); Raiza Goulão (BRA) (XCC); Alex Malacarne (BRA) (XCO); Raiza Goulão (BRA) (XCO)	Fernando Contreras (ARG) (XCC); Florencia Monsálvez (CHI) (XCC); Ignacio Gallo (CHI) (XCO); Florencia Monsálvez (CHI) (XCO)	
7–8 February	Shimano Supercup Massi La Nucía	(Spain) La Nucia	1	Maximilian Brandl (GER); Rebecca Henderson (AUS)	Sebastian Fini Carstensen (DEN); Kelsey Urban (USA)	Riley Amos (USA); Gwendalyn Gibson (USA)	
14–15 February	Costa Rican Open of Downhill (CROpen)	(Costa Rica) San José	1	Tyler Ervin (USA); Ainsley Wolf (USA)	Kai Burleson (USA); Samantha Porras (USA)	Colin McElyea (USA); Acacia Ralene Boshoff Bejarano (CRC)	
15 February	Kızılalan MTB Cup – XCO	(Turkey) Antalya	1	Antoine Jamin (BEL); Tatiana Saitarova	Clément Horny (BEL); Maria Sherstiuk (UKR)	Adrien Anciaux (BEL); Tatyana Geneleva (KAZ)	
27 February – 1 March	Internacional MTB Series #1	(Brazil) Lavras	1	Nicolas Rafhael Amancio (BRA) (XCC); Karen Olímpio (BRA) (XCC); Nicolas Rafhael Amancio (BRA) (XCO); Raiza Goulão (BRA) (XCO)	Ulan Bastos Galinski (BRA) (XCC); Raiza Goulão (BRA) (XCC); Ulan Bastos Galinski (BRA) (XCO); Karen Olímpio (BRA) (XCO)	José Gabriel Marques de Almeida (BRA) (XCC); Gabriela Pereira Ferolla (BRA) (XCC); José Gabriel Marques de Almeida (BRA) (XCO); Isabella Lacerda (BRA) (XCO)	
28 February – 1 March	Puerto Rico MTB Cup	(Puerto Rico) Rincón	1	Gerardo Ulloa (COL) (XCC); Savilia Blunk (USA) (XCC); Gerardo Ulloa (COL) (XCO); Savilia Blunk (USA) (XCO)	Gunnar Holmgren (CAN) (XCC); Madigan Munro (USA) (XCC); Tyler Orschel (CAN) (XCO); Madigan Munro (USA) (XCO)	Cole Paton (USA) (XCC); Ella Myers (CAN) (XCC); Riley Amos (USA) (XCO); Ella Myers (CAN) (XCO)	
28 February – 1 March	SA XCO Cup Series #1	(South Africa) Cape Town	1	Michael Foster (RSA) (XCC); Tyler Jacobs (RSA) (XCC); Alan Hatherly (RSA) (XCO); Candice Lill (RSA) (XCO)	Johann van Zyl (RSA) (XCC); Greta Seiwald (ITA) (XCC); Michael Foster (RSA) (XCO); Greta Seiwald (ITA) (XCO)	Roger Surén (NAM) (XCC); Faranak Partoazar (IRI) (XCC); Johann van Zyl (RSA) (XCO); Tyler Jacobs (RSA) (XCO)	
1 March	Gran Premio Zaragoza XCO	(Spain) Zaragoza	1	Tobias Lillelund (DEN); Anne Terpstra (NED)	Thibaut François Baudry (ESP); Estíbaliz Sagardoy (ESP)	Christopher Dawson (IRL); Janika Lõiv (EST)	
1 March	VTT Chabrières	(France) Guéret	1	Dario Lillo (SUI); Léna Gérault (FRA)	Jens Schuermans (BEL); Olivia Onesti (FRA)	Thomas Griot (FRA); Anaïs Moulin (FRA)	
6–7 March	Italia Bike Cup - Internazionali Crosscountry Coppa Citta di Albenga	(Italy) Albenga	1	Mathis Azzaro (FRA); Laura Stigger (AUT)	Lars Forster (SUI); Alessandra Keller (SUI)	Simone Avondetto (ITA); Sofie Heby Pedersen (DEN)	
6–8 March	International Cup XCO - CMPC Angol	(Chile) Angol	1	Ignacio Gallo (CHI) (XCC); Yarela González (CHI) (XCC); Ignacio Gallo (CHI) (XCO); Yarela González (CHI) (XCO)	Nicolás Delich (CHI) (XCC); María Castro González (CHI) (XCC); Sebastián Maldonado (CHI) (XCO); María Castro González (CHI) (XCO)	Maximiliano San Martín (CHI) (XCC); Only two riders (XCC); Patricio Farías Díaz (CHI) (XCO); Only two riders (XCO)	
7 March	Far West Race Stage 1	(Spain) Calatayud	1	Alberto Barroso (ESP); Natalia Fischer (ESP)	Adrián Benedito Gisbert (ESP); Melissa Maia (POR)	Paweł Bernas (POL); María Reyes Murillo Nogales (ESP)	
8 March	Gran Premio Internacional Candeleda-Gredos	(Spain) Candeleda	1	David Campos (ESP); Estíbaliz Sagardoy (ESP)	Hugo Franco Gallego (ESP); Janika Lõiv (EST)	Eneko Olveira Rodrigo (ESP); Cynthia Guadalupe Martín González (MEX)	
8 March	Copa Argentina XCO #2	(Argentina) San José de Metán	1	Agustín Durán (ARG); Agustina María Apaza (ARG)	Nicolás Reynoso (ARG); Agustina Antonella Quirós (ARG)	Facundo Cayata (ARG); Nicole Norma Abigail Arce (ARG)	
11–15 March	Crankworx - Rotorua Downhill	(New Zealand) Rotorua	1	Luke Meier-Smith (AUS); Jenna Hastings (NZL)	Dane Jewett (CAN); Louise-Anna Ferguson (GBR)	Tuhoto-Ariki Pene (NZL); Kate Hastings (NZL)	
13–15 March	Langford Bike Fest Canada Cup XCO/XCC	(Canada) Langford	1	Carter Woods (CAN) (XCC); Jennifer Jackson (CAN) (XCC); Jack Spranger (USA) (XCO); Jennifer Jackson (CAN) (XCO)	Jack Spranger (USA) (XCC); Marin Lowe (CAN) (XCC); Carter Woods (CAN) (XCO); Marin Lowe (CAN) (XCO)	Mika Comaniuk (CAN) (XCC); Ella MacPhee (CAN) (XCC); Mika Comaniuk (CAN) (XCO); Ella MacPhee (CAN) (XCO)	
18 March	US Pro Cup	(United States) Fayetteville	1	Christopher Blevins (USA); Haley Batten (USA)	Riley Amos (USA); Madigan Munro (USA)	Zorak Paillé (CAN); Gwendalyn Gibson (USA)	
19 March	Serbia Epic Andrevlje XCO #1	(Serbia) Novi Sad	1	Maximilian Brandl (GER); Anne Terpstra (NED)	Tobias Lillelund (DEN); Seraina Leugger (SUI)	Jan Zatloukal (CZE); Vita Movrin (SVN)	
20–22 March	Japan Mountain Bike Cup	(Japan) Izu	1	Yuan Jinwei (CHN) (XCC); Liang Zhenglan (CHN) (XCC); Yuan Jinwei (CHN) (XCO); Liang Zhenglan (CHN) (XCO)	Denis Sergiyenko (KAZ) (XCC); Gao Yuanpan (CHN) (XCC); Chen Keyu (CHN) (XCO); Wu Zhifan (CHN) (XCO)	Toki Sawada (JPN) (XCC); Wang Ting (CHN) (XCC); He Xuehui (CHN) (XCO); Yang Maocuo (CHN) (XCO)	
20–22 March	Red Bull Tennessee National	(United States) Oliver Springs	1	Austin Dooley (USA); Aletha Ostgaard (USA)	Cole Suetos (USA); Kailey Skelton (USA)	Michael Delesalle (CAN); Raina Logar (USA)	
21–22 March	Portugal Cup DHI - Downhill Monte da Padela	(Portugal) Carvoeiro	1	George Madley (GBR); Maria Pomés (ESP)	Antoine Rogge (FRA); Zoe Zamora (ESP)	Noa Hirst Walker (GBR); Kira Zamora (ESP)	
21–22 March	Super Cup Rimm Challenge	(Peru) Lima	1	William Tobay Mogrovejo (ECU); Smith Guerrero Olivera (PER)	Frank Farfán Palomino (PER); Fabiana Vélez Hanke (PER)	Frank Jampier Balcón Jeri (PER); Jackeline Gonzales Moreno (PER)	
22 March	Shimano Supercup Massi Sabiñánigo	(Spain) Sabiñánigo	1	Jofre Cullell (ESP); Chiara Teocchi (ITA)	Vlad Dascălu (ROU); Vida López (USA)	Nathan Cornillon (FRA); Yana Belomoyna (UKR)	
22 March	Serbia Epic Andrevlje XCO #4	(Serbia) Novi Sad	1	Maximilian Brandl (GER); Anne Terpstra (NED)	Tobias Lillelund (DEN); Seraina Leugger (SUI)	Erik Hægstad (NOR); Giada Specia (ITA)	
29 March	34. KTM Kamptal Trophy	(Austria) Langenlois	1	Max Foidl (AUT); Mona Mitterwallner (AUT)	Mario Bair (AUT); Giada Specia (ITA)	Julius Scherrer (AUT); Natalia Grzegorzewska (POL)	
29 March	XCO Lošinj	(Croatia) Mali Lošinj	1	Alberto Capoia (ITA); Luca Bramati (ITA)	Nadir Colledani (ITA); Gabriela Wojtyła (POL)	Lukas Hatz (AUT); Laura Squarise (ITA)	
10–12 April	CIMTB #1 - XCO/XCC/XCM	(Brazil) Conceição do Mato Dentro	1	Gustavo Xavier de Oliveira (BRA) (XCC); Raiza Goulão (BRA) (XCC); Alex Malacarne (BRA) (XCO); Raiza Goulão (BRA) (XCO); Gustavo Xavier de Oliveira (BRA) (XCM); Gabriela Pereira Ferolla (BRA) (XCM)	Alex Malacarne (BRA) (XCC); Isabella Lacerda (BRA) (XCC); Gustavo Xavier de Oliveira (BRA) (XCO); Giuliana Salvini Morgen (BRA) (XCO); Alex Malacarne (BRA) (XCM); Isabella Lacerda (BRA) (XCM)	Mario Couto Grego Santos (BRA) (XCC); Giuliana Salvini Morgen (BRA) (XCC); Mario Couto Grego Santos (BRA) (XCO); Isabella Lacerda (BRA) (XCO); Nicolas de Menezes Romão (BRA) (XCM); Liege Walter (BRA) (XCM)	
11 April	XCO Premantura Rocky Trails	(Croatia) Premantura	1	Alexandre Martins (FRA); Yana Belomoyna (UKR)	Lukas Hatz (AUT); Regina Bruchner (HUN)	Alexander Hammerle (AUT); Munira Yasin (ISR)	
11 April	Orange Seal Pro Cup P/B Vailocity	(United States) Temecula	1	Christopher Blevins (USA); Haley Batten (USA)	Carter Woods (CAN); Jennifer Jackson (CAN)	Riley Amos (USA); Savilia Blunk (USA)	
11–12 April	Copa Aguavista XCO	(Paraguay) San Juan del Paraná	1	Ulan Bastos Galinski (BRA); Catalina Vidaurre (CHI)	Luiz Cocuzzi (BRA); Karen Olímpio (BRA)	Jhonnatan Botero Villegas (COL); Agustina Antonella Quirós (ARG)	
12 April	Lloyds National MTB Cross Country Series #2	(United Kingdom) Cannock Chase	1	Cole Punchard (CAN); Evie Richards (GBR)	Corran Carrick-Anderson (GBR); Isla Short (GBR)	Sondre Rokke (NOR); Bethany-Ann Jackson (GBR)	
12 April	3 Nations Cup - Watersley XCO Challenge	(Netherlands) Sittard	1	Jens Schuermans (BEL); Bloeme Kalis (NED)	Freek Bouten (NED); Emeline Detilleux (BEL)	Antoine Jamin (BEL); Mae Cabaca (NED)	
12 April	Superprestigio MTB	(Spain) Estella-Lizarra	1	Jofre Cullell (ESP); Chiara Teocchi (ITA)	Vlad Dascălu (ROU); Marta Cano (ESP)	Alejandro García Vázquez (ESP); Estíbaliz Sagardoy (ESP)	
17–19 April	Downhill Internacional - Santiago de Besteiros - Serra do Caramulo	(Portugal) Besteiros	1	Noa Hirst Walker (GBR); Kira Zamora (ESP)	Álvaro Pestana (POR); Margarida Bandeira (POR)	Jack Reading (GBR); Joana dos Santos Nunes (POR)	
18 April	Nedbank Namibia XC 1	(Namibia) Windhoek	1	Michael Foster (RSA); Naama Noyman (ISR)	Massimiliano Ambrosi (RSA); Delsia Janse van Vuuren (NAM)	Tomer Zaltsman (ISR); Anri Greeff (NAM)	
18–19 April	Czech MTB Cup	(Czech Republic) Město Touškov	1	Ondřej Cink (CZE); Anne Terpstra (NED)	Patrik Černý (CZE); Lia Schrievers (GER)	Jan Zatloukal (CZE); Adéla Holubová (CZE)	
18–19 April	Polestar Soon Bikedays	(Norway) Son	1	Sondre Rokke (NOR) (XCC); Lisa Kristine Jorde (NOR) (XCC); Sebastian Fini Juul (DEN) (XCO); Caroline Bohé (DEN) (XCO)	Sivert Ekroll (NOR) (XCC); Oda Laforce (NOR) (XCC); Knut Røhme (NOR) (XCO); Lisa Kristine Jorde (NOR) (XCO)	William Handley (NOR) (XCC); Elin Ålsjö (SWE) (XCC); Sivert Ekroll (NOR) (XCO); Oda Laforce (NOR) (XCO)	
19 April	Castro Legend Cup - X Legend - XCM	(Italy) Castro	1	Jakob Dorigoni (ITA); Sandra Mairhofer (ITA)	Gioele De Cosmo (ITA); Claudia Peretti (ITA)	Stefano Goria (ITA); Adelheid Morath (GER)	
25 April	Italia Bike Cup - MTB Caneva Trophy	(Italy) Caneva	1	Nadir Colledani (ITA); Giada Specia (ITA)	Filippo Fontana (ITA); Sara Cortinovis (ITA)	Gioele Bertolini (ITA); Lucia Bramati (ITA)	
26 April	MTB Croatia Cup - Vodice	(Croatia) Vodice	1	Oleksandr Hudyma (UKR); Lejla Njemčević (BIH)	Louis Beltritti (FRA); Angelina Hinder (AUT)	Timéo Olive (FRA); Elena Dal Ben (ITA)	
26 April	Shimano Supercup Massi Santa Susanna	(Spain) Santa Susanna	1	Jofre Cullell (ESP); Léna Gérault (FRA)	Nathan Cornillon (FRA); Yana Belomoyna (UKR)	Mats Tubaas Glende (NOR); Marta Cano (ESP)	
1–2 May	The Showdown @Angler's Ridge	(United States) Danville	1	Alexander Woodford (CAN) (XCC); Ingrid McElroy (USA) (XCC); Owen Clark (CAN) (XCO); Ingrid McElroy (USA) (XCO)	Sandy Floren (USA) (XCC); Elli Clark (CAN) (XCC); Carson Beckett (USA) (XCO); Alexia Harel (CAN) (XCO)	Colin O'Neil (USA) (XCC); Alexia Harel (CAN) (XCC); Sandy Floren (USA) (XCO); Lily Rose Marois (CAN) (XCO)	
2 May	Bike Marathon Garda Trentino - XCM	(Italy) Riva del Garda	1	Stefano Goria (ITA); Anna Weinbeer (SUI)	Tim Smeenge (NED); Luisa Daubermann (GER)	Davide Foccoli (ITA); Claudia Peretti (ITA)	
2–3 May	Rye Bike Festival / Rye Terrengsykkelfestival XCO/XCC	(Norway) Oslo	1	Sondre Rokke (NOR) (XCO); Janika Lõiv (EST) (XCO); Sondre Rokke (NOR) (XCC); Oda Laforce (NOR) (XCC)	Ole Sigurd Rekdahl (NOR) (XCO); Jitka Čábelická (CZE) (XCO); Ole Sigurd Rekdahl (NOR) (XCC); Janika Lõiv (EST) (XCC)	Mats Tubaas Glende (NOR) (XCO); Thea Siggerud (NOR) (XCO); Mārtiņš Blūms (LVA) (XCC); Thea Siggerud (NOR) (XCC)	
9–10 May	7. Wilder Kaiser MTB Race	(Austria) Scheffau am Wilden Kaiser	1	Mario Bair (AUT) (XCO); Katrin Embacher (AUT) (XCO); Julius Scherrer (AUT) (XCC); Giulia Rinaldoni (ITA) (XCC)	Janis Baumann (SUI) (XCO); Sina van Thiel (GER) (XCO); Anatol Friedl (AUT) (XCC); Paulina Lange (GER) (XCC)	Anatol Friedl (AUT) (XCO); Sophia Knaubert (AUT) (XCO); Brent van Geest (NED) (XCC); Andrea Brugger (ITA) (XCC)	
9–10 May	Czech MTB Cup	(Czech Republic) Vimperk	1	Jonas King (GER); Natalia Grzegorzewska (POL)	Kryštof Bažant (CZE); Adéla Holubová (CZE)	Jan Sáska (CZE); Simona Spěšná (CZE)	
9–10 May	Portugal Cup DHI - Downhill de Prozelo	(Portugal) Prozelo	1	Noa Hirst Walker (GBR); Kira Zamora (ESP)	Omri Danon (ISR); Margarida Bandeira (POR)	Daniel Castellanos (ESP); Ana Leite (POR)	
10 May	Grand Prix Prijedor	(Bosnia and Herzegovina) Prijedor	1	Gian Bütikofer (SUI); Mariia Sukhopalova (UKR)	Oleksandr Hudyma (UKR); Zuzanna Krzystała (POL)	Yaroslav Shvedov; Anastasiia Viiuk (UKR)	
10 May	Lloyds National MTB Cross Country Series #3	(United Kingdom) Tong	1	Corran Carrick-Anderson (GBR); Grace Inglis (GBR)	Cameron Orr (GBR); Bethany-Ann Jackson (GBR)	Innes McDonald (GBR); Evie Strachan (GBR)	
15 May	Huskvarna MTB Tour	(Sweden) Huskvarna	1	William Handley (NOR); Elin Ålsjö (SWE)	Sivert Ekroll (NOR); Emma Belforth (SWE)	Leo Lounela (SWE); Thea Persson (SWE)	
16 May	Italia Bike Cup - Courmayeur MTB Event	(Italy) Courmayeur	1	Simone Avondetto (ITA); Sofie Heby Pedersen (DEN)	Juri Zanotti (ITA); Léna Gérault (FRA)	Filippo Fontana (ITA); Finja Lipp (GER)	
17 May	28. Kamniški Kros	(Slovenia) Kamnik	1	Nadir Colledani (ITA); Vita Movrin (SVN)	Lukas Hatz (AUT); Giada Specia (ITA)	Anatol Friedl (AUT); Ella MacPhee (CAN)	
17 May	Jura Bike Marathon - XCM	(Switzerland) Vallorbe	1	Tim Smeenge (NED); Anna Weinbeer (SUI)	Tristan Arioli (FRA); Alessia Nay (SUI)	Jakob Hartmann (GER); Margot Moschetti (FRA)	
17 May	Serbia Epic Požarevac XCO	(Serbia) Požarevac	1	Tomer Zaltsman (ISR); Tatiana Saitarova	Yaroslav Shvedov; Anastasiia Viiuk (UKR)	Victor-Alexandru Aron (ROU); Mariia Orekhova (UKR)	
23–24 May	76 Ultimate Downhill #1	(Indonesia) Bantul	1	Dimas Aradhana (INA); Milatul Khaqimah (INA)	Andy Prayoga (INA); Ayu Triya Andriana (INA)	Nazwa Agazani (INA); Nining Purwaningsih (INA)	
29–31 May	CIMTB #2 - XCO/XCC/XCM	(Brazil) Araxá	1	Gustavo Xavier de Oliveira (BRA) (XCC); Karen Olímpio (BRA) (XCC); Alex Malacarne (BRA) (XCO); Karen Olímpio (BRA) (XCO); Gustavo Xavier de Oliveira (BRA) (XCM); Karen Olímpio (BRA) (XCM)	Alex Malacarne (BRA) (XCC); Raiza Goulão (BRA) (XCC); Gustavo Xavier de Oliveira (BRA) (XCO); Raiza Goulão (BRA) (XCO); Alex Malacarne (BRA) (XCM); Isabella Lacerda (BRA) (XCM)	José Gabriel Marques de Almeida (BRA) (XCC); Isabella Lacerda (BRA) (XCC); José Gabriel Marques de Almeida (BRA) (XCO); Isabella Lacerda (BRA) (XCO); Sherman Trezza de Paiva (BRA) (XCM); Yarela González (CHI) (XCM)	
30 May	Shimano Supercup Massi Naturland	(Andorra) Sant Julià de Lòria	1	Gerardo Ulloa (MEX); Paula Gorycka (POL)	Jofre Cullell (ESP); Yana Belomoyna (UKR)	Ever Alejandro Gómez (BOL); Mariona Ratera (ESP)	
30 May	3 Nations Cup - MTB Festival Vlaanderen	(Belgium) Genk	1	Jarne Vandersteen (BEL); Bloeme Kalis (NED)	Freek Bouten (NED); Julia van der Meulen (NED)	Sverre Van Lee (BEL); Alicia Franck (BEL)	
30 May	Internationaler Raiffeisen Österreich Grand Prix	(Austria) Windhaag bei Perg	1	Mario Bair (AUT); Mona Mitterwallner (AUT)	Julius Scherrer (AUT); Antonia Grangl (AUT)	Lukas Hatz (AUT); Sophia Knaubert (AUT)	
30 May	Muszynianka Poland Cup Puchar Polski MTB XCO	(Poland) Krynica-Zdrój	1	Krzysztof Łukasik (POL); Gabriela Wojtyła (POL)	Maciej Jarosławski (POL); Klaudia Czabok (POL)	Filip Helta (POL); Joanna Glowacka (POL)	
30–31 May	Sherbrooke Canada Cup - XCO/XCC	(Canada) Sherbrooke	1	Léandre Bouchard (CAN) (XCC); Greta Kilburn (USA) (XCC); Félix Antoine Leclair (CAN) (XCO); Rafaëlle Carrier (CAN) (XCO)	Tristan Taillefer (CAN) (XCC); Alexia Harel (CAN) (XCC); Léandre Bouchard (CAN) (XCO); Greta Kilburn (USA) (XCO)	Félix Antoine Leclair (CAN) (XCC); Lily Rose Marois (CAN) (XCC); Tristan Taillefer (CAN) (XCO); Alexia Harel (CAN) (XCO)	
31 May	Škoda Swiss Bike Cup - Savognin	(Switzerland) Savognin	1	Fabio Püntener (SUI); Ramona Forchini (SUI)	Marcel Guerrini (SUI); Rebekka Estermann (SUI)	Luca Schätti (SUI); Emilly Johnston (CAN)	
5–7 June	Baie-Saint-Paul Canada Cup XCO & XCC	(Canada) Baie-Saint-Paul	1	Raphael Piche (CAN) (XCC); Alexia Harel (CAN) (XCC); Léandre Bouchard (CAN) (XCO); Alexia Harel (CAN) (XCO)	Fletcher Adams (NZL) (XCC); Lily Rose Marois (CAN) (XCC); Felix-Antoine Leclair (CAN) (XCO); Lily Rose Marois (CAN) (XCO)	Felix-Antoine Leclair (CAN) (XCC); Léa Bouchard (CAN) (XCC); Tristan Taillefer (CAN) (XCO); Ayana Gagne (CAN) (XCO)	
6 June	XCO Samobor	(Croatia) Samobor	1	Agustín Durán (ARG); Mona Mitterwallner (AUT)	Julien Bard (SUI); Yana Belomoyna (UKR)	Tomáš Ševců (CZE); Sabrina Rizzi (ITA)	
6–7 June	Czech MTB Cup	(Czech Republic) Bedřichov	1	Jan Zatloukal (CZE); Natalia Grzegorzewska (POL)	Jan Sáska (CZE); Jitka Čábelická (CZE)	Kryštof Bažant (CZE); Tereza Tvarůžková (CZE)	
6–7 June	Obos Oslo Bike Festival – XCC/XCO	(Norway) Oslo	1	Sondre Rokke (NOR) (XCC); Oda Laforce (NOR) (XCC); Martin E. Farstadvoll (NOR) (XCO); Oda Laforce (NOR) (XCO)	Edvin Elofsson (SWE) (XCC); Elin Ålsjö (SWE) (XCC); Sondre Rokke (NOR) (XCO); Sara Aaboe Kallestrup (DEN) (XCO)	Birk Strand Rønnestad (NOR) (XCC); Eline Ekroll (NOR) (XCC); Mats Tubaas Glende (NOR) (XCO); Eline Ekroll (NOR) (XCO)	
6–7 June	Tropical Mountain Bike Challenge 2	(Puerto Rico) Cidra	1	Georwill Pérez Román (PUR) (XCC); Ana Maria Roa (COL) (XCC); Georwill Pérez Román (PUR) (XCO); Ana Maria Roa (COL) (XCO)	Antonio Gómez Ortiz (COL) (XCC); Only one rider (XCC); Jacob Morales (PUR) (XCO); Only one rider (XCO)	Angel Rodríguez Morales (PUR) (XCC); Only one rider (XCC); Angel Rodríguez Morales (PUR) (XCO); Only one rider (XCO)	
10 June	Canmore MTB Classic	(Canada) Canmore	1	Ivan Sippy (USA); Raiza Goulão (BRA)	Logan Sadesky (CAN); Elli Clark (CAN)	Sandy Floren (USA); Alexia Harel (CAN)	
12–14 June	Internazionali d'Italia - DH Rider Cup	(Italy) Aprica	1	Lorenzo Mascherini (ITA); Eleonora Guglielmi (ITA)	Gregorio Arnoul (ITA); Lisa Gava (ITA)	Patrick Venturi (ITA); Alia Marcellini (ITA)	
13–14 June	Abierto Argentino #1 - XCO/XCC	(Argentina) San Fernando del Valle de Catamarca	1	Fernando Contreras (ARG) (XCC); Inés Gutierrez (ARG) (XCC); Fernando Contreras (ARG) (XCO); Inés Gutierrez (ARG) (XCO)	Joaquín Isaías Reyes Carranza (ARG) (XCC); Justina Gerardi (ARG) (XCC); Facundo Cayata (ARG) (XCO); Agustina María Apaza (ARG) (XCO)	Ignacio Pereyra (ARG) (XCC); Agustina María Apaza (ARG) (XCC); Ignacio Pereyra (ARG) (XCO); Justina Gerardi (ARG) (XCO)	
14 June	MTB French Cup - DHI	(France) Métabief	1	Kimi Viardot (FRA); Laïs Bonnaure (FRA)	Mathieu Balizet (FRA); Elise Porta (FRA)	Yannick Baechler (SUI); Fantine Jeannerod (FRA)	
14 June	XCO Gradina Classic	(Bosnia and Herzegovina) Čapljina	1	Dmytro Titarenko (UKR); Maria Sherstiuk (UKR)	Alexandros Athanasiadis (GRE); Ekaterina Kovalchuk (CYP)	Patrick Pescaru (ROU); Anastasiia Viiuk (UKR)	
26–28 June	Soho Bike Fest	(United States) Midway	1	Austin Beard (USA) (XCC); Nico Knoll (CAN) (XCC); Ivan Sippy (USA) (XCO); Nico Knoll (CAN) (XCO)	Toby Hassett (USA) (XCC); Elisabeth Knight (USA) (XCC); Austin Beard (USA) (XCO); Ana María Roa (COL) (XCO)	Brayden Johnson (USA) (XCC); Bayli McSpadden (USA) (XCC); Brayden Johnson (USA) (XCO); Elisabeth Knight (USA) (XCO)	
26–28 June	Copa Colombia III	(Colombia) Cundinamarca Department	1	Jhonnatan Botero Villegas (COL); Gloria Garzón (COL)	Iván Felipe López (COL); Diana Pinilla (COL)	Jonathan Cántor Sánchez (COL); Paula Nicole Ladino (COL)	
27 June	Grandprix Fichtelgerbirge	(Czech Republic) Aš	1	Ondřej Cink (CZE); Tereza Tvarůžková (CZE)	Paul Irmscher (GER); Andrea Kravanja (GER)	Tobias Steinhart (GER); Annemijn van Limpt (NED)	
27–28 June	Nockstein Trophy	(Austria) Koppl	1	Mario Bair (AUT); Tamara Wiedmann (AUT)	Lukas Hatz (AUT); Sophia Knaubert (AUT)	Julius Scherrer (AUT); Nora Fischer (AUT)	
27–28 June	Alpago Bike Funtastic	(Italy) Chies d'Alpago	1	Gioele Bertolini (ITA); Nicole Pesse (ITA)	Giulio Peruzzo (ITA); Marika Celestino (ITA)	Gabriel Borre (ITA); Sabrina Rizzi (ITA)	
27–28 June	SA XCO Cup Series	(South Africa) Pietermaritzburg	1	Johann van Zyl (RSA) (XCC); Riley Smith (RSA) (XCC); Johann van Zyl (RSA) (XCO); Errin Mackridge (RSA) (XCO)	Daniel van der Watt (RSA) (XCC); Errin Mackridge (RSA) (XCC); Omar Wilson (RSA) (XCO); Riley Smith (RSA) (XCO)	Samuel Cleary (RSA) (XCC); Lilian Baber (RSA) (XCC); Samuel Cleary (RSA) (XCO); Stacey Hyslop (ZIM) (XCO)	
28 June	Greenzone Zalaegerszeg XCO	(Hungary) Zalaegerszeg	1	Agustín Durán (ARG); Gabriela Wojtyła (POL)	Matej Ulík (SVK); Nora Fischer (AUT)	František Hojka (CZE); Angelina Hinder (AUT)	
4–5 July	St. Félicien Canada Cup XCO/XCC	(Canada) Saint-Félicien	1	Mika Comaniuk (CAN) (XCC); Lily Rose Marois (CAN) (XCC); Mika Comaniuk (CAN) (XCO); Ayana Gagne (CAN) (XCO)	Owen Deale (USA) (XCC); Ayana Gagne (CAN) (XCC); Mathis Duval (CAN) (XCO); Maude Ruelland (CAN) (XCO)	Mathis Duval (CAN) (XCC); Maude Ruelland (CAN) (XCC); Emile Perreault (CAN) (XCO); Lily Rose Marois (CAN) (XCO)	
10–12 July	Internacional MTB Series #3	(Brazil) Passos	1	Jhonnatan Botero (COL); Isabella Lacerda (BRA)	José Gabriel Marques de Almeida (BRA); Hercília Najara (BRA)	Nicolas Rafhael Amancio (BRA); Luiza Cocuzzi (BRA)	
11–12 July	iXS European Downhill Cup	(France) Les Orres	1	Neo Tielens (BEL); Soline Besson (FRA)	Mika Brands (NED); Laïs Bonnaure (FRA)	Ian Guionnet (FRA); Kerstin Sallegger (AUT)	
17 July	International Cup Race #5	(Israel) Kula Forest	1	Tomer Zaltsman (ISR); Naama Noyman (ISR)	Tomer Caspi (ISR); Zohar Bar Joseph (ISR)	Yoav Lifshitz (ISR); Munira Yasin (ISR)	
18–19 July	MTB French Cup - DHI	(France) Puy-Saint-Vincent	1	Johan Garcin (FRA); Cassandre Peizerat (FRA)	Ian Guionnet (FRA); Laïs Bonnaure (FRA)	Mylann Falquet (FRA); Soline Besson (FRA)	
24–26 July	Up to Postăvaru CRD#3	(Romania) Poiana Brașov	1	Philip Atwill (GBR); Luana Cherecheș (ROU)	Matei Huțanu (ROU); Denitsa Tosheva (BUL)	Marius-Achim Popovici (ROU); Ilinca Neagoe (ROU)	
30–31 July	Crankworx - Rockshox Canadian Open DHI	(Canada) Whistler	1	Jackson Goldstone (CAN); Aletha Ostgaard (USA)	Troy Brosnan (AUS); Matilda Melton (USA)	Luke Meier-Smith (AUS); Ellie Hulsebosch (NZL)	
6–9 August	Dieppe Canada Cup	(Canada) Dieppe	1	Gunnar Holmgren (CAN) (XCC); Lily Rose Marois (CAN) (XCC); Gunnar Holmgren (CAN) (XCO); Lily Rose Marois (CAN) (XCO)	Owen Clark (CAN) (XCC); Alexia Harel (CAN) (XCC); Owen Clark (CAN) (XCO); Alexia Harel (CAN) (XCO)	Maxime St-Onge (CAN) (XCC); Lily Rose Marois (CAN) (XCC); Maxime St-Onge (CAN) (XCO); Maude Ruelland (CAN) (XCO)	
9 August	3 Nations Cup - Majlen Sunshine Race No. 3	(Germany) Winterberg	1	Tom Schellekens (NED); Bloeme Kalis (NED)	Jens Schuermans (BEL); Femke Mossinkoff (NED)	Chris Van Dijk (NED); Jette Aelken (GER)	
15–16 August	Czech MTB Cup	(Czech Republic) Ostrava	1	Ondřej Cink (CZE); Natalia Grzegorzewska (POL)	Jan Zatloukal (CZE); Gabriela Wojtyła (POL)	František Hojka (CZE); Tereza Tvarůžková (CZE)	
16 August	Vittoria-Fischer MTB-Cup: Lostorf	(Switzerland) Obergösgen	1	Lars Forster (SUI); Sammie Maxwell (NZL)	Marcel Guerrini (SUI); Greta Seiwald (ITA)	Jarne Vandersteen (BEL); Léna Gérault (FRA)	
21–23 August	Copa Internacional XCO - La Castellana	(Chile) Lo Barnechea	1	Fernando Contreras (ARG) (XCO); Yarela González (CHI) (XCO); Fernando Contreras (ARG) (XCC); Yarela González (CHI) (XCC)	Sebastian Miranda (CHI) (XCO); María González (CHI) (XCO); Patricio Farías Díaz (CHI) (XCC); María González (CHI) (XCC)	Alvaro Macías (ARG) (XCO); Only two athletes started (XCO); Sebastian Miranda (CHI) (XCC); Only two athletes started (XCC)	
22–23 August	76 Ultimate Downhill #2	(Indonesia) Kudus	1	Cancelled			
5–6 September	Czech MTB Cup	(Czech Republic) Nové Město na Moravě	1	Jens Schuermans (BEL); Lia Schrievers (GER)	Jan Zatloukal (CZE); Adéla Holubová (CZE)	Nils Johansson (SWE); Natalia Grzegorzewska (POL)	
5–6 September	MTB French Cup - DHI	(France) Châtel	1	Yannick Baechler (SUI); Zoé Fayolle (FRA)	Johan Garcin (FRA); Laïs Bonnaure (FRA)	Hugo Frixtalon (FRA); Siel van der Velden (BEL)	
5–6 September	Nilsbyen Race Weekend	(Norway) Trondheim	1	Ole Sigurd Rekdahl (NOR) (XCC); Oda Laforce (NOR) (XCC); Sondre Rokke (NOR) (XCO); Oda Laforce (NOR) (XCO)	Birk Strand Rønnestad (NOR) (XCC); Eline Ekroll (NOR) (XCC); Petter Fagerhaug (NOR) (XCO); Eline Ekroll (NOR) (XCO)	Petter Fagerhaug (NOR) (XCC); Agnes Vatterholm Jernberg (NOR) (XCC); Ole Sigurd Rekdahl (NOR) (XCO); Hedda Steine Gulholm (NOR) (XCO)	
5–6 September	Super Cup Rimm Challenge	(Peru) Lima	1	Iván Felipe López (COL); Miryam Núñez (ECU)	Alexis Quinteros (ECU); Smith Guerrero (PER)	Edson Serrano Retamozo (PER); Noemi Jacinto Espinoza (PER)	
6 September	Rize MTB Cup - XCO	(Turkey) Rize	1	Dmytro Titarenko (UKR); Maria Sherstiuk (UKR)	Oleksandr Hudyma (UKR); Iryna Shymanska (UKR)	Timeo Olive (FRA); Azize Bekar (TUR)	
11–13 September	Borovets Open Cup	(Bulgaria) Borovets	1	Andreas Theodorou (CYP); Denitsa Tosheva (BUL)	Nikolaos Maragkos (GRE); Nadia Theocharidou (CYP)	Georgios Choutos (GRE); Doroteya Borisova (BUL)	
11–13 September	MTB French Cup - XCO/XCE	(France) Brouains	1	Thibaut Kahlhoven (FRA) (XCE); Margaux Borrelly (FRA) (XCE); Tom Perrin (FRA) (XCO); Emeline Detilleux (BEL) (XCO)	Killian Hampiaux (FRA) (XCE); Cynthia Boivinet (FRA) (XCE); Pierre de Froidmont (BEL) (XCO); Tatiana Tournut (FRA) (XCO)	Romain Covarel (FRA) (XCE); Amandine Vidon (FRA) (XCE); Martin Groslambert (FRA) (XCO); Lauriane Duraffourg (FRA) (XCO)	
13 September	Palandöken MTB Cup - XCO	(Turkey) Erzurum	1	Oleksandr Hudyma (UKR); Tatiana Saitarova	Dmytro Titarenko (UKR); Maria Sherstiuk (UKR)	Emre Yavuz (TUR); Iryna Shymanska (UKR)	
19–20 September	Banyuwangi Ijen Geopark Downhill	(Indonesia) Banyuwangi	1	Agung Prio Apriliano (INA); Nilna Murni Ningtias (INA)	Pahraz Salman Al Parisi (INA); Milatul Khaqimah (INA)	Yosi Saputro (INA); Ayu Triya Andriana (INA)	
19–20 September	Karl XII Rittet	(Norway) Halden	1	Petter Fagerhaug (NOR) (XCO); Oda Laforce (NOR) (XCO); Sondre Rokke (NOR) (XCC); Oda Laforce (NOR) (XCC)	Ole Sigurd Rekdahl (NOR) (XCO); Elin Ålsjö (SWE) (XCO); Ole Sigurd Rekdahl (NOR) (XCC); Elin Ålsjö (SWE) (XCC)	Viktor Lindqvist (SWE) (XCO); Saga Elf Boberg (SWE) (XCO); Petter Fagerhaug (NOR) (XCC); Hedda Steine Gulholm (NOR) (XCC)	
25–27 September	CIMTB #3 - XCO/XCC/XCM	(Brazil) Congonhas	1	Alex Malacarne (BRA) (XCC); Karen Olímpio (BRA) (XCC); Alex Malacarne (BRA) (XCO); Karen Olímpio (BRA) (XCO); Alex Malacarne (BRA) (XCM); Isabella Lacerda (BRA) (XCM)	Nicolas Rafhael Amancio (BRA) (XCC); Marcela Lima (BRA) (XCC); Nicolas Rafhael Amancio (BRA) (XCO); Raiza Goulão (BRA) (XCO); Luiz Miguel Campos Honório (BRA) (XCM); Ana Laura Oliveira de Moraes (BRA) (XCM)	Mário Couto Grego Santos (BRA) (XCC); Ana Laura Oliveira de Moraes (BRA) (XCC); Gustavo Xavier de Oliveira (BRA) (XCO); Isabella Lacerda (BRA) (XCO); Sherman Trezza (BRA) (XCM); Anabelle Aparecida Freitas Meira (BRA) (XCM)	
25–27 September	iXS European Downhill Cup Bike Park Pohorje Maribor	(Slovenia) Maribor	1	Riko Mäeuibo (EST); Elise Porta (FRA)	James MacDermid (NZL); Kerstin Sallegger (AUT)	Denis Kohút (SVK); Abigail Hogie (USA)	
26 September	Bike Marathon Pulmón de Acero - XCM	(Spain) Barakaldo	1	Luis Francisco Pérez (ESP); Natalia Fischer (ESP)	Raul Villar (ESP); Malena Seer (AUT)	Eneko Olveira Rodrigo (ESP); Cristina Morán Roza (ESP)	
27 September	XCO Predolac	(Croatia) Metković	1	Maks Alfred Barret Maunz (AUT); Vita Movrin (SLO)	Lennart-Jan Krayer (GER); Lejla Njemčević (BIH)	Lukas Hatz (AUT); Gabriela Wojtyła (POL)	
3 October	Tierra Estella Epic - XCM	(Spain) Ayegui – Aiegi	1	Gerard Blanch (ESP); Corina Mesplet Terroba (ESP)	Adrián Benedito Gisbert (ESP); Estíbaliz Sagardoy (ESP)	Adrián García Montes (ESP); Ainara Elbusto (ESP)	
18 October	Hammerstone - XCM	(Netherlands) Valkenburg	1	Tom Schellekens (NED); Sabrina Stultiens (NED)	Jakob Hartmann (GER); Rosa van Doorn (NED)	Niek Hoornsman (NED); Klara Sofie Skovgård Hansen (DEN)	
27 October	Triple Crown DH Mini Series #1	(United States) Philo	1	Benny de Vall (CAN); Zanna Logar (USA)	Ryder Wilson (CAN); Allison Ward (USA)	Kai Sorensen (USA); Alyana Van Horn (USA)	
30 October	Triple Crown DH Mini Series #2	(United States) Philo	1	Ryder Wilson (CAN); Raina Logar (USA)	Landon de Vall (CAN); Zanna Logar (USA)	Seppy Binsbergen (NZL); Alyana Van Horn (USA)	
31 October – 1 November	76 Ultimate Downhill #3	(Indonesia) Kudus	1	Dimas Aradhana (INA); Milatul Khaqimah (INA)	Khoiful Mukhib (INA); Nilna Murni Ningtias (INA)	Agung Prio Apriliano (INA); Ayu Triya Andriana (INA)	
1 November	Triple Crown DH Mini Series #3	(United States) Philo	1	Kai Sörensen (USA); Zanna Logar (USA)	Ryder Wilson (CAN); Raina Logar (USA)	Benny de Vall (CAN); Alyana Van Horn (USA)	

=== Class 2 (2) ===
Date	Race Name	Location	Class	Winner	Second	Third	Ref
25 January	Cyprus MTB XCO Race – Lofou Edition	(Cyprus) Lofou	2	Jan Zatloukal (CZE); Styliana Camelari (CYP)	Ondřej Novotný (CZE); Tina Vrhovnik (SLO)	Yoav Lifshitz (ISR); Talia Ish Shalom (ISR)	
31 January	Cyprus MTB XCO – Pyrga Edition	(Cyprus) Pyrga	2	Ondřej Novotný (CZE); Styliana Camelari (CYP)	Jan Zatloukal (CZE); Tina Vrhovnik (SLO)	Jules Cherel (FRA); Eirini Karousou (GRE)	
6 February	International Cup Race #1	(Israel) Mishmar HaEmek	2	Tomer Zaltsman (ISR); Naama Noyman (ISR)	Yoav Lifshitz (ISR); Munira Yasin (ISR)	Victor Enev (BUL); Romi Veldnizki (ISR)	
8 February	Copa ECEDAO MTB	(Puerto Rico) Salinas	2	Georwill Pérez (PUR); Suheily Rodríguez (PUR)	Cam McCallum (CAN); Kimberly Escobar (COL)	Ángel Rodríguez Morales (PUR); Gabriella Tejada (DOM)	
15 February	Red Bull Valparaíso Cerro Abajo	(Chile) Valparaíso	2	Sebastian Holguin (COL)	Adrien Loron (FRA)	Felipe Agurto Galleguillos (CHI)	
21–22 February	Copa Argentina XCO #1	(Argentina) Piedra del Águila	2	Kevin Ingratta (ARG)	Federico Curual (ARG)	Thomas Bustamante (ARG)	
26–28 February	AMS UCC India #1	(India) Bir	2	Tsewang Norboo (IND) (XCO); Sayu Bella Sukma Dewi (INA) (XCO); Agung Prio Apriliano (INA) (DHI); Riska Amelia Agustina (INA) (DHI); Tsewang Norboo (IND) (XCC); No riders started (XCC); Tsewang Norboo (IND) (XCE); No riders started (XCE)	Zaenal Fanani (INA) (XCO); Nur Deena Safia Nor Effandy (MAS) (XCO); Virendra Mali (IND) (DHI); Nining Purwaningsih (INA) (DHI); Zaenal Fanani (INA) (XCC); No riders started (XCC); Khushiman Gharti (IND) (XCE); No riders started (XCE)	Khushiman Gharti (IND) (XCO); Vara Sefti Rahmadani (INA) (XCO); Abhijeet Gharad (IND) (DHI); Sudhakar Thilothamma (IND) (DHI); Khushiman Gharti (IND) (XCC); No riders started (XCC); Feri Yudoyono (INA) (XCE); No riders started (XCE)	
6–8 March	Taça Brasil de Cross-Country RJ	(Brazil) Paraíba do Sul	2	Ulan Bastos Galinski (BRA); Raiza Goulão (BRA)	Nicolas Rafhael Amancio (BRA); Karen Olímpio (BRA)	José Gabriel Marques de Almeida (BRA); Ana Laura Oliveira de Moraes (BRA)	
8 March	Far West Race Stage	(Spain) Calatayud	2	Hans Becking (NED); Natalia Fischer (ESP)	Roberto Bou Martin (ESP); Melissa Maia (POR)	Adrián Benedito Gisbert (ESP); Esther Villaret Reche (ESP)	
8 March	Portugal Cup XCO - Paredes de Coura International XCO	(Portugal) Paredes de Coura	2	Gonçalo Amado (POR); Beatriz Guerra (POR)	Roberto Ferreira (POR); Lara Lois García (ESP)	João Cruz (POR); Lorena Patiño (ESP)	
8 March	Coupe AURA VTT XCO	(France) Salavas	2	Antoine Jamin (BEL); Léna Gérault (FRA)	Zian Sanciaut (FRA); Noémie Médina (FRA)	Maxime Ayral (FRA); Anaïs Moulin (FRA)	
12–15 March	Campeonato Centroamericanos de MTB	Antigua Guatemala	2	Carlos Herrera (CRC) (XCO); Cristel Espinoza (CRC) (XCO); Esdras Morales (GUA) (XCM); Ninoska Andino (HON) (XCM); Luis López (HON) (XCC); Cristel Espinoza (CRC) (XCC); Netzer Quan (GUA) (E–MTB XCM); No riders started (E–MTB XCM); Antonio Juan Martínez (GUA) (DHI); Betzy Sosa Mérida (GUA) (DHI)	Luis López (HON) (XCO); Mary Rachel Daggett (GUA) (XCO); Rudy Matzar (GUA) (XCM); Xenia Estrada (ESA) (XCM); Carlos Herrera (CRC) (XCC); Isabel García (CRC) (XCC); Julio Ramírez (GUA) (E–MTB XCM); No riders started (E–MTB XCM); Marvin Spiegeler Barrera (GUA) (DHI); Paola Barillas (GUA) (DHI)	Max González (GUA) (XCO); Florinda de León (GUA) (XCO); Genaro Velásquez (GUA) (XCM); Fátima Cristales (GUA) (XCM); Jared Barrera (GUA) (XCC); Linda Menéndez (HON) (XCC); Yonatan Girón (GUA) (E–MTB XCM); No riders started (E–MTB XCM); José Monzón Fagiani (GUA) (DHI); Only two riders started (DHI)	
14 March	Italia Bike Cup - Verona MTB Internationale	(Italy) Verona	2	Filippo Fontana (ITA); Laura Stigger (AUT)	Matteo Siffredi (ITA); Sofie Heby Pedersen (DEN)	Andri Frischknecht (SUI); Sara Cortinovis (ITA)	
14 March	Sudamericano XCM	(Uruguay) Minas	2	Catriel Soto (ARG); Ana Carolina Alvarez Marmissolle (URU)	Juan Cruz de Figueredo (ARG); Ana Laura Fontes Nuñez (URU)	Sergio Santiago Poma (ARG); Angélica Ascorreta (URU)	
14–15 March	Portugal Cup DHI - Porto de Mós	(Portugal) Porto de Mós	2	Marius Krähenbühl (SUI); Margarida Bandeira (POR)	Jack Reading (GBR); Zoe Zamora (ESP)	Tomás Barreiros (POR); Kira Zamora (ESP)	
14–15 March	Rock Creek Rumble	(United States) Zirconia	2	Carson Beckett (USA) (XCC); Elli Clark (CAN) (XCC); Tyler Orschel (CAN) (XCO); Elli Clark (CAN) (XCO)	Owen Clark (CAN) (XCC); Madison Maloney (USA) (XCC); Owen Clark (CAN) (XCO); Ayana Gagne (CAN) (XCO)	Tyler Orschel (CAN) (XCC); Madeleine Pollock (CAN) (XCC); Carson Beckett (USA) (XCO); Madison Maloney (USA) (XCO)	
15 March	Copa Catalana Internacional Biking Point - Corró D'Amunt	(Spain) Corró d'Amunt	2	Jofre Cullell (ESP); Tereza Tvarůžková (CZE)	Tom Schellekens (NED); Núria Bosch (ESP)	Lucas Salierno (ITA); Lorena Patiño (ESP)	
15 March	Bilbao Bizkaia Green Series XCO	(Spain) Bilbao	2	Eneko Olveira Rodrigo (ESP); Olivia Onesti (FRA)	Gexan Albisu (ESP); Chiara Teocchi (ITA)	Antoine Lachaize (FRA); Cynthia Guadalupe Martín González (MEX)	
20 March	Serbia Epic Andrevlje XCO #2	(Serbia) Novi Sad	2	Maximilian Brandl (GER); Anne Terpstra (NED)	Jan Zatloukal (CZE); Vita Movrin (SVN)	Tobias Lillelund (DEN); Lucia Bramati (ITA)	
21 March	13ª Jamón Bike - XCM	(Spain) Calamocha	2	Roberto Bou Martin (ESP); Esther Villaret Reche (ESP)	José Dias (POR); Costanza Fasolis (ITA)	Sergio Gutiérrez Aguilar (ESP); Pilar Fernández (ESP)	
21 March	Serbia Epic Andrevlje XCO #3	(Serbia) Novi Sad	2	Maximilian Brandl (GER); Anne Terpstra (NED)	Fabian Eder (GER); Giada Specia (ITA)	Julius Scherrer (AUT); Seraina Leugger (SUI)	
27–29 March	Internacional Estrada Real # 1 XCC/XCO	(Brazil) Congonhas	2	Jose Gabriel Marques (BRA) (XCO); Raiza Goulão (BRA) (XCO); Jose Gabriel Marques (BRA) (XCC); Karen Olímpio (BRA) (XCC)	Luiz Cocuzzi (BRA) (XCO); Karen Olímpio (BRA) (XCO); Fernando Nunes de Souza (BRA) (XCC); Raiza Goulão (BRA) (XCC)	Nicolas Rafhael Amancio (BRA) (XCO); Isabella Lacerda (BRA) (XCO); Mário Couto (BRA) (XCC); Luiza Cocuzzi (BRA) (XCC)	
28 March	XXIII "Rusza Peleton" Puchar Polski MTB XCO V Memoriał im. Wiesława Grabka	(Poland) Ogrodniczki	2	Karol Ostaszewski (POL); Klaudia Czabok (POL)	Szymon Pomian (POL); Zuzanna Krzystała (POL)	Maciej Jarosławski (POL); Joanna Głowacka (POL)	
29 March	Erandio Green Series XCO	(Spain) Erandio	2	Vlad Dascălu (ROU); Chiara Teocchi (ITA)	Miguel Díaz Pérez (ESP); Estíbaliz Sagardoy (ESP)	Iñigo Sagardoy (ESP); Iraia Zapirain Olasagasti (ESP)	
29 March	Lloyds National MTB Cross Country Series #1	(United Kingdom) Newnham Park	2	Max Greensill (GBR); Evie Strachan (GBR)	Max Standen (GBR); Bethany-Ann Jackson (GBR)	Innes McDonald (GBR); Daisy Taylor (GBR)	
29 March	Vittoria-Fischer MTB Cup	(Switzerland) Langendorf	2	Maxime L'Homme (SUI); Fiona Schibler (SUI)	Andri Frischknecht (SUI); Seraina Leugger (SUI)	Nick Burki (SUI); Tina Züger (SUI)	
4 April	Valbek Velká cena Ústí nad Labem	(Czech Republic) Ústí nad Labem	2	Patrik Černý (CZE); Jitka Čábelická (CZE)	Matej Ulík (SVK); Tereza Tvarůžková (CZE)	František Hojka (CZE); Matylda Szczecińska (POL)	
5 April	3 Nations Cup - Zwiep Scott Cup - XCO	(Netherlands) Oldenzaal	2	Jarne Vandersteen (BEL); Bloeme Kalis (NED)	Christopher Dawson (IRL); Alicia Franck (BEL)	Freek Bouten (NED); Femke Mossinkoff (NED)	
11–12 April	Portugal Cup XCO - Abrantes	(Portugal) Abrantes	2	Roberto Ferreira (POR); Ana Santos (POR)	João Fonseca (POR); Lara Lois (ESP)	Luca Pérez Arganda (ESP); Lorena Patiño (ESP)	
12 April	Pre-Europeo Templarios MTB Race - XCM	(Spain) Jerez de los Caballeros	2	Adrián Benedito Gisbert (ESP); Natalia Fischer (ESP)	Raúl Rodríguez Jiménez (ESP); Corina Mesplet (ESP)	Luis Francisco Pérez (ESP); María Reyes Murillo (ESP)	
19 April	Shimano MTB Liga #1	(Denmark) Roskilde	2	Mikkel Lose (DEN); Julie Lillelund (DEN)	Kristian Østergaard Andersen (DEN); Sara Aaboe Kallestrup (DEN)	Nikolaj Hougs (DEN); Smilla Glud (DEN)	
19 April	G.P. Internacional X-Sauce	(Spain) Alpedrete	2	David Campos (ESP); Estíbaliz Sagardoy (ESP)	Hugo Franco (ESP); Lorena Patiño (ESP)	Francesc Barber (ESP); Lucía Gómez (ESP)	
19 April	Ferdi Zeyrek MTB Race Series - XCO	(Turkey) Manisa	2	Egor Titov; Tatiana Saitarova	Vadim Gvozdarev; Sofya Keller	Victor Enev (BUL); Emine Sezer (TUR)	
25 April	29 Genoa Cup - Marathon dell'Appennino - XCM	(Italy) Casella	2	Dario Cherchi (ITA); Adelheid Morath (GER)	Martin Frey (GER); Alessia Nay (SUI)	Lorenzo Trincheri (ITA); Greta Recchia (ITA)	
25–26 April	Portugal Cup XCO - Lousada International	(Portugal) Lousada	2	Ricardo Marinheiro (POR); Lison Desprez (FRA)	Roberto Ferreira (POR); Lorena Patiño (ESP)	Gonçalo Amado (POR); Anaïs Moulin (FRA)	
26 April	Torq 3 Nations Cup - VAM-Trophy Drenthe	(Netherlands) Drijber	2	Tom Schellekens (NED); Bloeme Kalis (NED)	Freek Bouten (NED); Femke Mossinkoff (NED)	Brent van Geest (NED); Julia van der Meulen (NED)	
26 April	Ortuella Green Series XCO - Las Balsas XC	(Spain) Ortuella	2	Eneit Vertiz (ESP); Estíbaliz Sagardoy (ESP)	Gexan Albisu Etxebeste (ESP); Lucía Miralles (ARG)	Nathan Célié (FRA); Mónica Estrada Martínez (ESP)	
1 May	International Cup Race #2	(Israel) Kokhav Ya'ir–Tsur Yig'al	2	Tomer Caspi (ISR); Naama Noyman (ISR)	Yoav Lifshitz (ISR); Munira Yasin (ISR)	Nir Tchwella (ISR); Zohar Bar Joseph (ISR)	
1–3 May	Internacional MTB Series #2	(Brazil) Pará de Minas	2	Jose Gabriel Marques (BRA) (XCO); Raiza Goulão (BRA) (XCO); Gustavo Xavier de Oliveira (BRA) (XCC); Karen Olímpio (BRA) (XCC)	Gustavo Xavier de Oliveira (BRA) (XCO); Karen Olímpio (BRA) (XCO); Mário Couto (BRA) (XCC); Hercilia Najara (BRA) (XCC)	Mário Couto (BRA) (XCO); Isabella Lacerda (BRA) (XCO); Eiki Leôncio (BRA) (XCC); Isabella Lacerda (BRA) (XCC)	
2 May	Gigante Small XCM	(Spain) Sant Joan de Moró	2	Adrián Benedito Gisbert (ESP); Corina Mesplet (ESP)	Pau Marzà Bedós (ESP); Laura Ríos (ESP)	Xavier Pijuan Porcel (ESP); María Mercedes Villanueva (ESP)	
2 May	Shimano Supercup Massi Vitoria	(Spain) Vitoria-Gasteiz	2	Gexan Albisu Etxebeste (ESP); Lucía Miralles (ARG)	Raúl Villar Blanco (ESP); Núria Bosch (ESP)	David Campos (ESP); Magali Albisu (ESP)	
2 May	Klippingracet	(Sweden) Säter	2	Viktor Lindqvist (SWE); Elin Ålsjö (SWE)	André Eriksson (SWE); Thea Persson (SWE)	Edvin Elofsson (SWE); Emma Belforth (SWE)	
2–3 May	iXS Downhill Cup	(Czech Republic) Loučná nad Desnou	2	Lino Neumann (GER); Amelia Dudek (POL)	Denis Kohút (SVK); Karolína Kadlecová (CZE)	Ondřej Kolečík (CZE); Emma Bindhammer (AUT)	
3 May	XCO Krizni put Posedarje	(Croatia) Posedarje	2	Alberto Capoia (ITA); Mariia Sukhopalova (UKR)	Dmytro Titarenko (UKR); Anastasiia Viiuk (UKR)	Rok Naglič (SVN); Ana Rumiha (CRO)	
3 May	Shimano MTB Liga #2	(Denmark) Rold Skov	2	Hector Hjorth (DEN); Julie Lillelund (DEN)	Kristian Andersen (DEN); Sara Kallestrup (DEN)	Paw Kragh (DEN); Freja Andersen (DEN)	
9 May	XIV. Csömör Nagydij	(Hungary) Csömör	2	Barnabás Vas (HUN); Regina Bruchner (HUN)	Ede-Károly Molnár (ROU); Joanna Głowacka (POL)	Vince Dániel Kiss (HUN); Zuzanna Krzystała (POL)	
9 May	Best Prima Cup Harrachov - Jakuszyce - XCM	(Poland) Jakuszyce	2	Filip Adel (CZE); Klaudia Czabok (POL)	Karol Rożek (POL); Michalina Ziółkowska (POL)	Filip Rydval (CZE); Adéla Šmídová (CZE)	
9–10 May	Copa Argentina XCO #3	(Argentina) San Juan	2	Fernando Contreras (ARG) (XCO); Inés Gutiérrez (ARG) (XCO); Fernando Contreras (ARG) (XCC); Inés Gutiérrez (ARG) (XCC)	Alvaro Macías (ARG) (XCO); Justina Gerardi (ARG) (XCO); Juan Goudailliez (ARG) (XCC); Only one rider (XCC)	Facundo Cayata (ARG) (XCO); Only two riders (XCO); Lautaro Gallardo (ARG) (XCC); Only one rider (XCC)	
9–10 May	Portugal Cup XCO - Jamor	(Portugal) Algés, Linda-a-Velha e Cruz Quebrada-Dafundo	2	Gonçalo Amado (POR); Ana Santos (POR)	João Fonseca (POR); Beatriz Guerra (POR)	Duarte Galvão (POR); Lucía Gómez (ESP)	
10 May	Yason Serbia Epic Fruškogorski Maraton Ivan Davosir - XCM	(Serbia) Novi Sad	2	Joris Lemke (GER); No rider	Aliaksandr Astrouski; No rider	Anton Golubenko; No rider	
10 May	Ispaster Green Series XCO	(Spain) Ispaster	2	Francesc Barber (ESP); Lucía Miralles (ARG)	Nathan Celie (FRA); Núria Bosch (ESP)	Iñigo Sagardoy (ESP); Cynthia Martin (MEX)	
15–17 May	Weissensee DH	(Austria) Weissensee	2	Andreas Kolb (AUT); Rosa Zierl (AUT)	Max Becker (GER); Emma Bindhammer (AUT)	Julian Steiner (GER); Sandra Thomsen (DEN)	
16 May	Tessuti Sport Bike Race	(Czech Republic) Dlouhoňovice	2	Filip Helta (POL); Tereza Tvarůžková (CZE)	Ondřej Novotný (CZE); Gabriela Wojtyła (POL)	Václav Naxera (CZE); Natalia Grzegorzewska (POL)	
16 May	La Rioja Bike Race	(Spain) Logroño	2	Ulan Bastos Galinski (BRA); Catalina Vidaurre (CHI)	Felipe Orts (ESP); Alba Teruel (ESP)	Ever Alejandro Gómez (BOL); Corina Mesplet (ESP)	
17 May	Costa degli Etruschi Epic - XCM	(Italy) Marina di Bibbona	2	Andrin Beeli (SUI); Maria Cristina Nisi (ITA)	Stefano Valdrighi (ITA); Chiara Burato (ITA)	Lorenzo Biagi (ITA); Ester Iacopozzi (ITA)	
17 May	3 Nations Cup - MTB Topcompetitie Langdorp	(Belgium) Langdorp	2	Jarne Vandersteen (BEL); Annemijn van Limpt (NED)	Chris van Dijk (NED); Lola Bakker (NED)	Morris Gruiters (NED); Junne Vermeeren (BEL)	
17 May	G.P. Internacional XCO Penas de Rodas	(Spain) Lugo	2	Alejandro García Vázquez (ESP); Estíbaliz Sagardoy (ESP)	Hugo Franco Gallego (ESP); Lucía Miralles (ARG)	Francesc Barber (ESP); Mónica Estrada Martínez (ESP)	
23–24 May	Vulkan-Race Gedern - Internationale Bundesliga	(Germany) Gedern	2	Tobias Steinhart (GER); Paulina Lange (GER)	Sven Strähle (GER); Klara Müller (GER)	Elijah Witzack (GER); Michelle Luft (GER)	
24 May	Barakaldo Green Series XCO	(Spain) Barakaldo	2	Gexan Albisu Etxebeste (ESP); Lucía Miralles (ARG)	Eneit Vertiz (ESP); Lucía González Blanco (ESP)	Alberto Barroso (ESP); Cynthia Guadalupe Martín González (MEX)	
29 May	International Cup Race #3	(Israel) Meitar	2	Tomer Zaltsman (ISR); Naama Noyman (ISR)	Tomer Caspi (ISR); Zohar Bar Joseph (ISR)	Yoav Lifshitz (ISR); Romi Veldnizki (ISR)	
29–31 May	iXS Downhill Cup	(Germany) Willingen	2	Max Becker (GER); Karla Jörger (GER)	Tristan Stadlbauer (GER); Hanna Blochberger (GER)	Hannes Lehmann (GER); Lea Stornebel (GER)	
30 May	Bike Marathon	(Germany) Willingen	2	Aaron Wilhelmi (GER); Mariëlle Trouwborst (NED)	Teus Ruijter (NED); Lola Bakker (NED)	Joris Lemke (GER); Carolin Zinn (GER)	
31 May	Shimano MTB Liga #3	(Denmark) Varde	2	Edvin Elofsson (SWE); Sara Aaboe Kallestrup (DEN)	Kristian Østergaard Andersen (DEN); Freja Dissing Andersen (DEN)	Tobias Bendix (DEN); Janni Spangsberg (DEN)	
31 May	Monselice In Rosa MTB - XCM	(Italy) Monselice	2	Jacopo Billi (ITA); Giorgia Marchet (ITA)	Anton Sintsov; Nina Mosser (AUT)	Ramon Vantaggiato (ITA); Athina Tzoulaki (GRE)	
31 May	Serbia Epic Mionica "Stazama Vojvode Živojina Mišića"	(Serbia) Mionica	2	Aliaksandr Astrouski; Bojana Jovanović (SRB)	Emrah Ljubuškić (BIH); Valentina Nestorović (SRB)	Egor Egorov; Only two riders	
5–6 June	US Pro Cup P/B Washougal MTB	(United States) Washougal	2	Carson Beard (USA) (XCO); Eleanor Winchell (CAN) (XCO); Carson Beard (USA) (XCC); Eleanor Winchell (CAN) (XCC)	Yoann Perrodin (FRA) (XCO); Emma Wilcox (USA) (XCO); Preston Johnson (USA) (XCC); Emma Wilcox (USA) (XCC)	Preston Johnson (USA) (XCO); Zoe Peterson (USA) (XCO); Jake Johansen (USA) (XCC); Emma Clark (USA) (XCC)	
6–7 June	Hellenic National XC #1	(Greece) Salamina	2	Alexandros Athanasiadis (GRE) (XCO); Eleftheria Giachou (GRE) (XCO); Alexandros Athanasiadis (GRE) (XCC); Eleftheria Giachou (GRE) (XCC)	Charoun Molla (GRE) (XCO); Varvara Fasoi (GRE) (XCO); Charoun Molla (GRE) (XCC); Athina Tzoulaki (GRE) (XCC)	Andreas Stamatopoulos (GRE) (XCO); Athina Tzoulaki (GRE) (XCO); Aristarchos Adaktylos (GRE) (XCC); Varvara Fasoi (GRE) (XCC)	
7 June	Ollargan Green Series XCO	(Spain) Bilbao	2	Nathan Célié (FRA); Cynthia Guadalupe Martín González (MEX)	Miguel Ramírez de Arellano Pascual (ESP); Lucía González Blanco (ESP)	Unax Galan (ESP); Lucía Miralles (ARG)	
13 June	International MTB Marathon Malevil Cup - XCM	(Czech Republic) Jablonné v Podještědí	2	Filip Adel (CZE); Milena Kalašová (CZE)	Filip Rydval (CZE); Karla Nováková (CZE)	Anton Albrecht (GER); Helena Erbenová (CZE)	
13 June	SP XCO Bystricany	(Slovakia) Bystričany	2	Matej Ulík (SVK); Zuzanna Krzystała (POL)	František Hojka (CZE); Jana Czeczinkarová (CZE)	Piotr Hankus (POL); Angelina Hinder (AUT)	
13 June	Mythic - XCM	(France) Bourg-Saint-Maurice	2	Alessandro Saravalle (ITA); Marine Quintard (FRA)	Léo Bartoletti (FRA); Camille Girardin (FRA)	Pierre Billaud (FRA); Astrid Tardy (FRA)	
13–14 June	SWE Cup Sigtuna XCC/XCO	(Sweden) Sigtuna	2	Edvin Elofsson (SWE) (XCO); Adele Palmqvist (SWE) (XCO); Edvin Elofsson (SWE) (XCC); Adele Palmqvist (SWE) (XCC)	Joni Savaste (FIN) (XCO); Mairit Kaarjärv (EST) (XCO); Markus Karlsson (SWE) (XCC); Tova Fridström (SWE) (XCC)	Hugo Porath (SWE) (XCO); Elin Karlsson (SWE) (XCO); Hugo Porath (SWE) (XCC); Elin Karlsson (SWE) (XCC)	
14 June	Lloyds National MTB Cross Country Series #4	(United Kingdom) Ashdown Forest	2	Ben Askey (GBR); Bethany-Ann Jackson (GBR)	Thomas Mein (GBR); Evie Strachan (GBR)	Jason Bouttell (GBR); Caoimhe May (IRL)	
19–21 June	iXS Downhill Cup	(Austria) Semmering	2	Lino Neumann (GER); Justine Welzel (GER)	Max Becker (GER); Karla Jörger (GER)	Christof Stulik (AUT); Karolína Kadlecová (CZE)	
20 June	Cupa Crater XCO	(Romania) Betfia	2	Victor-Alexandru Aron (ROU); Miruna Măda (ROU)	Roberto-Dumitru Burța (ROU); Eszter Bereczki (ROU)	Peter Šoltés (SVK); Erika Glajzová (SVK)	
20–21 June	Race XCM Arica	(Chile) Arica	2				
20–21 June	Anadia International - XCO	(Portugal) Anadia	2	Roberto Ferreira (POR); Catarina Espada (POR)	João Cruz (POR); Laura Simão (POR)	João Fonseca (POR); Margarida Vasconcelos (POR)	
21 June	Lezama Green Series XCO	(Spain) Lezama	2	Eneko Olveira (ESP); Cynthia Guadalupe Martín González (MEX)	Eneit Vertiz (ESP); Núria Bosch (ESP)	Gexan Albisu (ESP); Lucía Miralles (ARG)	
21 June	Crater Maraton	(Romania) Betfia	2	József-Attila Málnási (ROU); Miruna Măda (ROU)	Florián Papcun (SVK); Eszter Bereczki (ROU)	Filip Greš (SVK); Only two riders	
27–28 June	Portugal Cup DHI	(Portugal) Almofala	2	Jack Reading (GBR); Kira Zamora (ESP)	Rueben Taylor (GBR); Bláithín Sweeny (IRL)	Héctor Quinteiro (ESP); Hannah Heyse (POR)	
27–28 June	Portugal Cup XCO - Ansiao	(Portugal) Ansião	2	Roberto Ferreira (POR); Beatriz Guerra (POR)	João Cruz (POR); Leandra Gomes (POR)	João Fonseca (POR); Marta Branco (POR)	
27–28 June	Gran Premio Ciudad del Ciclismo BTT XCO	(Spain) Cervera del Maestre	2	Francesc Barber (ESP); Estíbaliz Sagardoy (ESP)	Eneko Olveira (ESP); Cynthia Guadalupe Martín González (MEX)	Gexan Albisu (ESP); Mariona Ratera (ESP)	
28 June	Internacional Estrada Real # 2 XCM	(Brazil) Ouro Branco	2	Luiz Miguel Honório (BRA); Isabella Lacerda (BRA)	Sherman Trezza de Paiva (BRA); Iara Caetano (BRA)	Daniel Grossi Soares de Souza (BRA); Liege Walter (BRA)	
28 June	Gebze MTB Race Series - XCO	(Turkey) Kocaeli Province	2	Emre Yavuz (TUR); Azize Bekar (TUR)	Çınar Serdaroğlu (TUR); Tuğçe Bitirim (TUR)	Deniz Örnek (TUR); Eki̇n Ereke (TUR)	
3–5 July	iXS Downhill Cup	(Czech Republic) Špičák	2	Lino Neumann (GER); Hanna Blochberger (GER)	Max Becker (GER); Karolína Kadlecová (CZE)	Nico Lamm (GER); Justine Welzel (GER)	
5 July	Lloyds National MTB Cross Country Series #5	(United Kingdom) Margam	2	Max Standen (GBR); Greta Lawless (IRL)	Thomas Mein (GBR); Daisy Taylor (GBR)	Declan Oldham (GBR); Caoimhe May (IRL)	
5 July	Ergan MTB Cup	(Turkey) Erzincan	2	Ahmet Akpınar (TUR); Azize Bekar (TUR)	Furkan Akçam (TUR); Tuğçe Bitirim (TUR)	Çınar Serdaroğlu (TUR); Emine Sezer (TUR)	
5 July	Copa Argentina #1 - XCM	(Argentina) Andalgalá	2	Luciano Agustín Gay (ARG); Yésica Andrés Cantelmi (ARG)	Facundo Pérez Costa (ARG); Sabrina Guadalupe Nieva (ARG)	Leonardo Calvimonte (ARG); Lourdes Janet Díaz (ARG)	
11–12 July	Fernie Canada Cup DHI	(Canada) Fernie	2	Seth Sherlock (CAN); Lauren Rosser (CAN)	Henry Sherry (CAN); Megan Bedard (CAN)	Kirk McDowall (CAN); Emmy Lan (CAN)	
12 July	Lugnet XCO	(Sweden) Falun	2	Sondre Rokke (NOR); Emma Belforth (SWE)	Viktor Lindqvist (SWE); Elin Karlsson (SWE)	Edvin Elofsson (SWE); Agnes Vatterholm Jernberg (NOR)	
14–15 July	Kicking Horse Canada Cup DHI	(Canada) Golden	2	Gabriel Neron (CAN); Jenna Foreman (CAN)	Henry Sherry (CAN); Piper Graaten (CAN)	Jack Menzies (CAN); Lauren Rosser (CAN)	
18–19 July	Sun Peaks Canada Cup DH	(Canada) Sun Peaks	2	Jack Menzies (CAN); Jenna Foreman (CAN)	Henry Sherry (CAN); Lauren Rosser (CAN)	Gabriel Neron (CAN); Piper Graaten (CAN)	
25–26 July	Abierto Argentino #2 - XCO	(Argentina) Tandil	2	Fernando Contreras (ARG); Inés Gutiérrez (ARG)	Catriel Soto (ARG); Nicole Arce (ARG)	Joaquín Isaías Reyes Carranza (ARG); Justina Gerardi (ARG)	
26 July	La Vansa Bike Race	(Spain) Tuixent – la Vansa	2	Agustín Durán (ARG); Estíbaliz Sagardoy (ESP)	Ignacio Gallo (CHI); Lucia Miralles (ARG)	Raúl Villar (ESP); Núria Bosch (ESP)	
31 July – 2 August	Internazionali d'Italia - DH Rider Cup	(Italy) Bormio	2	Loris Revelli (ITA); Eleonora Farina (ITA)	Davide Palazzari (ITA); Veronika Widmann (ITA)	Gonzalo Gajdosech (ARG); Eleonora Guglielmi (ITA)	
31 July – 2 August	Internacional Estrada Real # 3 XCC/XCO	(Brazil) Conselheiro Lafaiete	2	Nicolas Rafhael Amancio (BRA) (XCO); Luiza Cocuzzi (BRA) (XCO); Nicolas Rafhael Amancio (BRA) (XCC); Luiza Cocuzzi (BRA) (XCC)	Mário Couto (BRA) (XCO); Hercilia Najara (BRA) (XCO); Mário Couto (BRA) (XCC); Hercilia Najara (BRA) (XCC)	Gustavo Roma (BRA) (XCO); Iara Caetano (BRA) (XCO); Gustavo Roma (BRA) (XCC); Iara Caetano (BRA) (XCC)	
1 August	M3 Montafon Mountainbike - XCM	(Austria) Schruns	2	Jakob Hartmann (GER); Anna Weinbeer (SUI)	Sascha Weber (GER); Milena Kalašová (CZE)	Sebastián Gesche (CHI); Adelheid Morath (GER)	
2 August	CBA Paprsek XCO	(Czech Republic) Horská chata Paprsek	2	František Hojka (CZE); Jana Czeczinkarová (CZE)	Agustín Durán (ARG); Chiara Solèr (SUI)	Fabian Eder (GER); Jitka Čábelická (CZE)	
8 August	SP XCO Oslany	(Slovakia) Oslany	2	Agustín Durán (ARG); Tereza Tvarůžková (CZE)	František Hojka (CZE); Gabriela Wojtyła (POL)	Krzysztof Łukasik (POL); Maria Sherstiuk (UKR)	
9 August	Shimano MTB Liga #4	(Denmark) Sorø	2	Nils Johansson (SWE); Freja Andersen (DEN)	Kristian Andersen (DEN); Viktoria Knudsen (DEN)	Måns Eliasson (SWE); Smilla Glud (DEN)	
9 August	Malatya MTB Cup	(Turkey) Malatya	2	Ahmet Akpınar (TUR); Azize Bekar (TUR)	Çınar Serdaroğlu (TUR); Tuğçe Bitirim (TUR)	Emre Yavuz (TUR); Melike Yiğit (TUR)	
14–15 August	Alba Carolina Bike Race	(Romania) Alba Iulia	2	Patrick Pescaru (ROU); Lejla Njemčević (BIH)	József–Attila Málnási (ROU); Miruna Măda (ROU)	Bogdan Duca (ROU); Iris Samuilă (ROU)	
16 August	Brookvale Canada Cup	(Canada) Brookvale Provincial Park	2	Owen Clark (CAN); Lily Rose Marois (CAN)	Tristan Taillefer (CAN); Léa Bouchard (CAN)	Félix-Antoine Leclair (CAN); Maude Ruelland (CAN)	
22–23 August	Stevie Smith Memorial Canada Cup DH	(Canada) Mount Washington	2	Seth Sherlock (CAN); Maya Langdale (CAN)	Jon Mozell (CAN); Only one competitor	Rafe Hudson (CAN); Only one competitor	
22–23 August	Copa K6 Naranjal	(Paraguay) Naranjal District	2	Lucas Bogado (PAR) (XCO); Marciele Musskopf (BRA) (XCO); Lucas Bogado (PAR) (XCC); Marciele Musskopf (BRA) (XCC)	Adhemar Oberladstätter (PAR) (XCO); Sindy Servín (PAR) (XCO); Máximo Cristaldo (PAR) (XCC); Sindy Servín (PAR) (XCC)	Máximo Cristaldo (PAR) (XCO); Marlene Maldonado (PAR) (XCO); Adhemar Oberladstätter (PAR) (XCC); Marlene Maldonado (PAR) (XCC)	
22–23 August	BCA Racet	(Sweden) Borås	2	Ole Sigurd Rekdahl (NOR) (XCO); Emma Belforth (SWE) (XCO); Ole Sigurd Rekdahl (NOR) (XCC); Elin Ålsjö (SWE) (XCC)	Petter Fagerhaug (NOR) (XCO); Elin Ålsjö (SWE) (XCO); Viktor Lindqvist (SWE) (XCC); Clara Widell (SWE) (XCC)	Viktor Lindqvist (SWE) (XCO); Hedda Steine Gulholm (NOR) (XCO); Petter Fagerhaug (NOR) (XCC); Emma Belforth (SWE) (XCC)	
30 August	Copa Argentina #2 - XCM	(Argentina) Río Negro Province	2	Agustín Álvarez (ARG); Sabrina Nieva (ARG)	Franco Forquera (ARG); Agostina Melgarejo (ARG)	Martin Aguilera (ARG); Only two competitors	
4–6 September	Internacional Estrada Real # 4 XCC/XCO	(Brazil) Barbacena	2	Cancelled			
4–6 September	Red Bull Cerro Abajo	(Germany) Stuttgart	2	Alex Marín (ESP); Paz Gallo Fuentes (CHI)	Roger Vieira (BRA); Nina Hoffmann (GER)	Tuhoto-Ariki Pene (NZL); Veronika Widmann (ITA)	
5–6 September	Asia Mountain Bike Series - Guiyang	(China) Guiyang	2	Wang Sheng (CHN) (XCO); Wang Ting (CHN) (XCO); Wang Sheng (CHN) (XCC); Wang Ting (CHN) (XCC); Guan Qingyun (CHN) (XCE); Wang Ting (CHN) (XCE)	Xie Guangchao (CHN) (XCO); Zhang Ziyi (CHN) (XCO); Gao Yongbing (CHN) (XCC); Tatyana Geneleva (KAZ) (XCC); Riyadh Hakim (SIN) (XCE); Qian Cunxiu (CHN) (XCE)	Gao Yongbing (CHN) (XCO); Li Facai (CHN) (XCO); Chen Keyu (CHN) (XCC); Zhang Ziyi (CHN) (XCC); Wang Zhihao (CHN) (XCE); Li Yi (CHN) (XCE)	
6 September	Abierto Argentino #3 - XCO	(Argentina) San Salvador de Jujuy	2	Álvaro Macías (ARG); Agustina Maria Apaza (ARG)	Ricardo Colque Domínguez (ARG); Only one rider	Fernando Damián Carrasco (ARG); Only one rider	
11–12 September	Caribbean Mountain Bike Cycling Championships	(Dominican Republic) Santiago de los Caballeros	2	Ángel David Rodríguez (DOM) (XCO); Gabriella Tejada (DOM) (XCO); Ángel David Rodríguez (DOM) (XCC); Gabriella Tejada (DOM) (XCC)	Alex Munoz Feliz (DOM) (XCO); Only one rider (XCO); Alex Munoz Feliz (DOM) (XCC); Only one rider (XCC)	Taïno Cailliau (FRA) (XCO); Only one rider (XCO); Edgar Enmanuel Vargas (DOM) (XCC); Only one rider (XCC)	
11–13 September	XCO - AGSport Internacional	(Brazil) Conceição do Coité	2	Kennedi Sampaio (BRA) (XCO); Anabelle Freitas (BRA) (XCO); Kennedi Sampaio (BRA) (XCC); No riders (XCC)	Matheus Martins (BRA) (XCO); Karina Lourrany Coimbra Vieira (BRA) (XCO); Matheus Martins (BRA) (XCC); No riders (XCC)	Guilherme Damasceno Ferreira (BRA) (XCO); Laila Lohana Freitas Chaves (BRA) (XCO); Flávio de Jesus Lobo Neto (BRA) (XCC); No riders (XCC)	
12 September	SP XCO Poracpark	(Slovakia) Poráč	2	Matej Ulík (SVK); Tereza Tvarůžková (CZE)	Filip Holub (CZE); Dorota Vojtíšková (SVK)	Karel Najser (CZE); Martina Šichtová (SVK)	
12–13 September	Hellenic National XC #2	(Greece) Drosopigi	2	Alexandros Athanasiadis (GRE) (XCO); Despoina Vathi (GRE) (XCO); Alexandros Athanasiadis (GRE) (XCC); Aikaterini Eleftheriadou (GRE) (XCC)	Charoun Molla (GRE) (XCO); Aikaterini Eleftheriadou (GRE) (XCO); Charoun Molla (GRE) (XCC); Despoina Vathi (GRE) (XCC)	Aristarchos Adaktylos (GRE) (XCO); Only two riders (XCO); Aristarchos Adaktylos (GRE) (XCC); Only two riders (XCC)	
12–13 September	Hallbyrundan	(Sweden) Jönköping	2	Nils Johansson (SWE) (XCO); Elin Ålsjö (SWE) (XCO); Edvin Elofsson (SWE) (XCC); Elin Ålsjö (SWE) (XCC)	Viktor Lindqvist (SWE) (XCO); Viktoria Knudsen (DEN) (XCO); Markus Karlsson (SWE) (XCC); Eiril Strand Rønnestad (NOR) (XCC)	Sigurd Stubberud (NOR) (XCO); Agnes Vatterholm Jernberg (NOR) (XCO); Viktor Lindqvist (SWE) (XCC); Clara Widell (SWE) (XCC)	
18–20 September	Internacional MTB Series #4	(Brazil) Arcos	2	Nicolas Rafhael Amancio (BRA); Isabella Lacerda (BRA)	Mário Couto (BRA); Marcela Lima Matos (BRA)	José Gabriel Marques (BRA); Luiza Cocuzzi (BRA)	
19 September	Shimano Supercup Massi Girona	(Spain) Girona	2	Antoine Philipp (FRA); Cynthia Boivinet (FRA)	Kas van Geest (NED); Lucía Gómez Andreu (ESP)	Nathan Cornillon (FRA); Mariona Ratera (ESP)	
20 September	Vuelta Ballenas	(Argentina) Puerto Madryn	2	Franco Orocito (ARG); Yesica Cantelmi (ARG)	Julián Barrientos (ARG); Carolina Pérez (ARG)	Diego Sepúlveda (ARG); Only two riders	
20 September	29. MTB Cross Country "Rund Um Den Roadlberg"	(Austria) Ottenschlag im Mühlkreis	2	Mario Bair (AUT); Tereza Tvarůžková (CZE)	Maks Maunz (AUT); Chiara Solèr (SUI)	Jan Zatloukal (CZE); Nora Fischer (AUT)	
20 September	Shimano MTB Liga #5	(Denmark) Silkeborg	2	Sebastian Fini Carstensen (DEN); Freja Andersen (DEN)	Tobias Lillelund (DEN); Smilla Glud (DEN)	Loris Hättenschwiler (SUI); Katrine Frederiksen (DEN)	
20 September	Royal Mountain Bike	(France) Chaumont-en-Vexin	2	Pierre de Froidmont (BEL); Anaïs Moulin (FRA)	Yann Chaptal (FRA); Laly Guyot (FRA)	Zian Sanciaut (FRA); Noémie Garnier (FRA)	
25–27 September	Sudamericano XCO/XCC/XCE	(Uruguay) Rocha	2	Alexis Benjamín Quinteros (ECU) (XCC); No riders started (XCC); Erick Fierro (ECU) (XCE); No riders started (XCE); Ignacio Gallo (CHI) (XCO); Yarela González (CHI) (XCO)	Ignacio Gallo (CHI) (XCC); No riders started (XCC); Martín Arias Rosales (ECU) (XCE); No riders started (XCE); Facundo Cayata (ARG) (XCO); Mikela Molina (ECU) (XCO)	Facundo Cayata (ARG) (XCC); No riders started (XCC); Alexis Benjamín Quinteros (ECU) (XCE); No riders started (XCE); Alexis Benjamín Quinteros (ECU) (XCO); Miryam Núñez (ECU) (XCO)	
27 September	Shimano MTB Liga #6	(Denmark) Slangerup	2	Viktor Lindqvist (SWE); Caroline Bohé (DEN)	Pierre de Froidmont (BEL); Freja Andersen (DEN)	Petter Fagerhaug (NOR); Viktoria Knudsen (DEN)	
27 September	Hellenic National XC #3	(Greece) Leros	2	Alexandros Athanasiadis (GRE); Athina Tzoulaki (GRE)	Zdeněk Vobecký (CZE); Despoina Vathi (GRE)	Spyridon Geralis (GRE); Only two riders	
2–4 October	iXS Downhill Cup	(Switzerland) Bellwald	2	Nicolas Baechler (SUI); Gianna Nef (SUI)	Lino Neumann (GER); Hanna Blochberger (GER)	Jules Troillet (SUI); Shahar Yehuda (ISR)	
4 October	Copa Argentina #3 – XCM	(Argentina) Profundidad	2	Juan Pablo Lescano (ARG); Agustina Quirós (ARG)	Alejandro Fabian Montiel (ARG); Bianca Plozzer (ARG)	Lautaro Alba (ARG); Andrea Silvina Benítez (ARG)	
8 October	International Cup Race #6	(Israel) Kula Forest	2	Tomer Zaltsman (ISR); Naama Noyman (ISR)	Eitan Levi (ISR); Munira Yasin (ISR)	Asaf Dinerman (ISR); Zohar Bar Joseph (ISR)	
9 October	International Cup Race #7	(Israel) Kula Forest	2	Tomer Zaltsman (ISR); Naama Noyman (ISR)	Victor Enev (BUL); Munira Yasin (ISR)	Asaf Dinerman (ISR); Zohar Bar Joseph (ISR)	
17–18 October	76 Ultimate Downhill #3	(Indonesia) Pasuruan	2	Agung Prio Apriliano (INA); Milatul Khaqimah (INA)	Yosi Saputro (INA); Nilna Murni Ningtias (INA)	Ahmad Nasywa Ridhodin (INA); Ayu Triya Andriana (INA)	
17–18 October	Internacional MTB Series #5	(Brazil) Oliveira	2	Cancelled			
18 October	Trans Itapua Bike - XCM	(Paraguay) Trinidad	2	Alejandro Montiel (ARG); Paola Corina Sosa (ARG)	Antonio Alfonso (PAR); Marciele Musskopf (BRA)	Brahian Joel Oberladstatter (PAR); Jule Lena Michaelis (GER)	
25 October	Costa Rica Internacional MTB Marathon	(Costa Rica) Cóbano	2	Sebastián Gesche (CHI); Diana Pinilla (COL)	Keyron Solis (CRC); Natalia Navarro (CRC)	Paolo Montoya (CRC); Only two riders	
29–31 October	Kelantan MTB Challenge 5.0 - XCO	(Malaysia) Machang	2	Feri Yudoyono (INA); Sayu Bella Sukma Dewi (INA)	Zaenal Fanani (INA); Nur Deena Safia Nor Effandy (MAS)	Muhammad Syawal Mazlin (MAS); Vara Sefti Rahmadani (INA)	
14 November	Ibero-Americano - XCO/XCC	(Argentina) Mar del Plata	2	Joaquín Isaías Reyes Carranza (ARG) (XCO); Ines Gutiérrez (ARG) (XCO); Franco Orocito (ARG) (XCC); Agustina Antonella Quirós (ARG) (XCC)	Ignacio Gallo (CHI) (XCO); Lucía Miralles (ARG) (XCO); Juan Ignacio Pereyra (ARG) (XCC); Luiza Eusébio de Souza (BRA) (XCC)	Juan Ignacio Pereyra (ARG) (XCO); Agustina Antonella Quirós (ARG) (XCO); Joaquín Isaías Reyes Carranza (ARG) (XCC); Ines Gutiérrez (ARG) (XCC)	
14–15 November	Asia MTB Series Danao City International MTB	(Philippines) Danao	2	Feri Yudoyono (ARG) (XCO); Sayu Bella Sukma Dewi (INA) (XCO); Chiang Sheng-shan (TPE) (DHI); Naomi Gardoce (PHI) (DHI)	Zaenal Fanani (INA) (XCO); Vara Sefti Rahmadani (INA) (XCO); Steve William Velayo (PHI) (DHI); Lea Denise Belgira (PHI) (DHI)	Ihza Muhammad (INA) (XCO); Adel Pia Sendrijas (PHI) (XCO); Simon Servillon (PHI) (DHI); Gwen Hannah Barba (PHI) (DHI)	
29 November	Asia Mountain Bike Series - Dirt Heroes International	(Philippines) Negros Oriental	2				
12–13 December	Tanjong Malim YDP Cup Mountain Bike International Challenge	(Malaysia) Tanjong Malim	2				

=== Class 3 (3) ===
Date	Race Name	Location	Class	Winner	Second	Third	Ref
31 January	Copa Catalana Internacional Biking Point – Sant Fruitós de Bages	(Spain) Sant Fruitós de Bages	3	Mario Sinués Micó (ESP); Tereza Tvarůžková (CZE)	Maxime Croket (BEL); Núria Bosch Picó (ESP)	Cristofer Bosque (ESP); Adaya Fernández (ESP)	
7–8 February	Red Bull Hardline Tasmania	(Australia) Maydena	3	Asa Vermette (USA); Gracey Hemstreet (CAN)	Rónán Dunne (IRL); Louise-Anna Ferguson (GBR)	Troy Brosnan (AUS); Only two riders started	
28 February	Gran Premio Zaragoza XCC	(Spain) Zaragoza	3	Tobias Lillelund (DEN); Anne Terpstra (NED)	Thibaut François Baudry (ESP); Estíbaliz Sagardoy (ESP)	David Campos (ESP); Lucía Gómez Andreu (ESP)	
1 March	MTB Topcompetitie Rotem	(Belgium) Dilsen-Stokkem	3	Jarne Vandersteen (BEL); Annemijn van Limpt (NED)	Kas van Geest (NED); Mirte Hubrechts (BEL)	Milan Stiens (BEL); Britt Segers (BEL)	
15 March	Coupe du Japon Aichi International	(Japan) Nagoya	3	Toki Sawada (JPN); Wu Zhifan (CHN)	Tatsuumi Soejima (JPN); Liang Zhenglan (CHN)	Yuan Jinwei (CHN); Sayu Bella Sukma Dewi (INA)	
28 March	34. KTM Kamptal Trophy - XCC	(Austria) Langenlois	3	Max Foidl (AUT); Mona Mitterwallner (AUT)	Maks Maunz (AUT); Giada Specia (ITA)	Filip Holub (CZE); Natalia Grzegorzewska (POL)	
3 April	Volcat BTT Igualada #1 - XCO	(Spain) Igualada	3	Hans Becking (NED); Marta Cano (ESP)	Corran Carrick-Anderson (GBR); Lola Bakker (NED)	Francesc Barber (ESP); Olivia Villard (FRA)	
4 April	Volcat BTT Igualada #2 - XCO	(Spain) Igualada	3	Corran Carrick-Anderson (GBR); Lola Bakker (NED)	Hans Becking (NED); Marta Cano (ESP)	Francesc Barber (ESP); Olivia Villard (FRA)	
11 April	Puchar Polski MTB XCO – Rząśnik, Singletrack Bagno Pulwy	(Poland) Rząśnik	3	Karol Ostaszewski (POL); Klaudia Czabok (POL)	Szymon Pomian (POL); Nikola Gliniecka (POL)	Maciej Jarosławski (POL); Antonina Białek (POL)	
12 April	Sæsonåbner MTB Race	(Denmark) Aabenraa	3	Sebastian Fini Carstensen (DEN); Elin Båge (SWE)	Hector Hjorth (DEN); Only one rider	Hector Damgaard (DEN); Only one rider	
18–19 April	SloEnduro TCS Nova Gorica - EE-MTBET#1	(Slovenia) Nova Gorica	3	Adrien Dailly (FRA); Florencia Espiñeira (CHI)	Andrea Garibbo (ITA); Claire Chabbert (FRA)	Théo Ruhlmann (FRA); Justine Henry (FRA)	
25 April	Hangony XCO	(Hungary) Hangony	3	Jakub Jenčuš (SVK); Zuzanna Krzystała (POL)	Florián Papcun (SVK); Panna Bungyis (HUN)	Matyáš Veber (CZE); Only two riders	
25–26 April	SA XCO Cup Series - XCC	(South Africa) Gauteng	3	Luke Moir (RSA); Candice Lill (RSA)	Johann van Zyl (RSA); Naama Noyman (ISR)	Roger Surén (NAM); Errin Mackridge (RSA)	
1 May	Rye Bike Festival / Rye Terrengsykkelfestival XCO/XCC	(Norway) Oslo	3	Sondre Rokke (NOR); Oda Laforce (NOR)	Ole Sigurd Rekdahl (NOR); Jitka Čábelická (CZE)	Mārtiņš Blūms (LVA); Thea Siggerud (NOR)	
3 May	City Mountainbike Eliminator Pro League - XCE/XCC	(Ethiopia) Addis Ababa	3	Matic Kranjec Žagar (SVN); Didi de Vries (NED)	Theo Hauser (AUT); Elodie Kuijper (NED)	Edvin Lindh (SWE); Monica Kiplagat (KEN)	
8–9 May	Englewood Open P/B Trek XC - XCC	(United States) Fall River	3	Austin Beard (USA); Ingrid McElroy (USA)	Logan Sadesky (CAN); Greta Kilburn (USA)	Carson Beard (USA); Lily Rose Marois (CAN)	
9–10 May	Scottish Enduro Series Round 2 - EDR	(United Kingdom) Pitfichie	3	Calum Mcbain (GBR); Martha Gill (GBR)	Cameron Jackson (GBR); Sian Dillon (GBR)	Ben Allan (GBR); Only two riders	
9–10 May	European E-MTB Enduro Tour	(Italy) Castino	3	Andrea Garibbo (ITA); Helen Weber (GER)	Adrien Dailly (FRA); Florencia Espiñeira (CHI)	Théo Ruhlmann (FRA); Claire Chabbert (FRA)	
10 May	Vittoria-Fischer MTB Cup: Aesch	(Switzerland) Aesch	3	Nick Burki (SUI); Seraina Leugger (SUI)	Joris Ryf (SUI); Finja Lipp (GER)	Leon Fischer (SUI); Faranak Partoazar (IRI)	
16 May	SP XCO Zlatnicka Dolina	(Slovakia) Skalica	3	Florián Papcun (SVK); Zuzanna Krzystała (POL)	Peter Šoltés (SVK); Tereza Kurnická (SVK)	Piotr Hankus (POL); Michaela Záhradná (SVK)	
16–17 May	American Series Costa Rica XCC	(Costa Rica) San José	3	Jose Gabriel Marques (BRA); Suheily Rodríguez (PUR)	Ivan Aguilar (MEX); Adriana Maria Rojas (CRC)	Jerónimo Bedoya (COL); Erika Monserrath Rodríguez (MEX)	
17 May	City Mountainbike Eliminator Series - European Challenge - XCE/XCC	(Serbia) Novi Sad	3	Šimon Němec (CZE) (XCC); Gaia Tormena (ITA) (XCC); Šimon Němec (CZE) (XCE); Gaia Tormena (ITA) (XCE)	Máté Szakács (ROU) (XCC); Karla Kustura (BIH) (XCC); Riccardo Zamero (ITA) (XCE); Lora Oravecz (HUN) (XCE)	Attila Gerely (HUN) (XCC); Lora Oravecz (HUN) (XCC); Máté Szakács (ROU) (XCE); Karla Kustura (BIH) (XCE)	
23–24 May	Coupe de Japon MTB Yawatahama International MTB Race - XCC	(Japan) Yawatahama	3	Riki Kitabayashi (JPN); Wu Zhifan (CHN)	Yanick Binz (SUI); Liang Zhenglan (CHN)	Tatsuumi Soejima (JPN); Wang Ting (CHN)	
30 May	City Mountainbike Eliminator Series - XCE/XCC	(Italy) Pieve di Soligo	3	Jakob Klemenčič (SLO); Gaia Tormena (ITA)	Theo Hauser (AUT); Elena Dal Ben (ITA)	Pietro Cao (ITA); Lora Oravecz (HUN)	
6–7 June	Internazionale Enduro - EDR	(Italy) Sauze d'Oulx	3	Davide Dalpian (ITA); Camilla Martinet (ITA)	Samuel Petrolillo (ITA); Giulia Mitidieri (ITA)	Daniele Aurame (ITA); Emilie Polo (ITA)	
7 June	Vittoria-Fischer MTB-Cup: Seon	(Switzerland) Seon	3	Joris Ryf (SUI); Fiona Schibler (SUI)	Gian Bütikofer (SUI); Faranak Partoazar (IRI)	Adrian Betschart (SUI); Cristel Hubacher (SUI)	
7 June	3 Nations Cup - Adler MTB Cup	(Germany) Remscheid	3	Jens Schuermans (BEL); Alicia Franck (BEL)	Ryan Laenen (BEL); Lotte Koopmans (NED)	Nick Klijn (NED); Britt Segers (BEL)	
7 June	Kabibo Banjak Alegria - XCE	(Philippines) Alegria	3	Tatsuumi Soejima (JPN); Ayaka Hiyoshi (JPN)	James Carl Dela Cruz (PHI); Yui Ishida (JPN)	Adrian Nacario (PHI); Alexandria Dormitorio (PHI)	
11 June	Canmore MTB Classic - XCC	(Canada) Canmore	3	Carson Beard (USA); Elli Clark (CAN)	Adair Prieto (MEX); Léa Bouchard (CAN)	Ivan Sippy (USA); Nico Knoll (CAN)	
14 June	CityMountainbike - XCC	(Turkey) Sakarya Province	3	Ede-Károly Molnár (ROU); Mariia Sukhopalova (UKR)	Dainis Bricis; Marion Fromberger (GER)	Matic Kranjec Žagar (SLO); Didi de Vries (NED)	
27 June	CityMountainbike - XCC	(Poland) Gdynia	3	Jakob Klemenčič (SLO); Mariia Sukhopalova (UKR)	Theo Hauser (AUT); Didi de Vries (NED)	Piotr Kryński (POL); Madison Boissiere (FRA)	
27 June	Gebze MTB Race Series - XCC	(Turkey) Kocaeli Province	3	Emre Yavuz (TUR); Azize Bekar (TUR)	Charoun Molla (GRE); Ekin Ereke (TUR)	Çınar Serdaroğlu (TUR); Tuğçe Bitirim (TUR)	
27–28 June	Red Bull Cerro Abajo Genova	(Italy) Genova	3	Roger Vieira (BRA)	Johannes Fischbach (GER)	Alex Marín (ESP)	
3 July	Picos Pro Race	(Brazil) Picos	3	Matheus Martins (BRA); Gabriele Eduarda Krol (BRA)	Romulo Brito (BRA); Layla Camila Lima Barros (BRA)	Mateus Stefanos Tavares de Moura (BRA); Magnólia Pereira dos Anjos (BRA)	
4–5 July	Coupe du Japon Fukushima Hiyama-Kogen	(Japan) Tamura	3	Zenshin Nozaki (JPN); Yui Ishida (JPN)	Tatsuumi Soejima (JPN); Yuki Mori (JPN)	Ari Hirabayashi (JPN); Minato Kitajima (JPN)	
10–11 July	4X Pro Tour - JBC 4X Revelations	(Czech Republic) Jablonec nad Nisou	3	Jáchym Vaněk (CZE); Nela Viktorová (CZE)	Milan Myšík (CZE); Michaela Hájková (CZE)	Pavel Reinl (CZE); Pavla Balíková (CZE)	
12 July	Velosolutions UCI Pumptrack World Championships Qualifier	(Belgium) Middelkerke	3	Tristan Borel (SUI); Julie Heusequin (BEL)	Didi Van Tiggel (BEL); Robyn Gommers (BEL)	Kristaps Veksa (LAT); Lauryne Sutur (FRA)	
13 July	Lugnet XCC	(Sweden) Falun	3	Sondre Rokke (NOR); Elin Karlsson (SWE)	Viktor Lindqvist (SWE); Agnes Vatterholm Jernberg (NOR)	Hugo Porath (SWE); Tova Fridström (SWE)	
24–26 July	MTB French Cup - XCE	(France) Puy-Saint-Vincent	3	Killian Hampiaux (FRA); Margaux Borrelly (FRA)	Dorian Bourg (FRA); Amandine Vidon (FRA)	Tim Sondermeijer (NED); Isaure Medde (FRA)	
24–26 July	Asia Mountain Bike Series - Zunyi - XCE/XCC	(China) Zunyi	3	Xing Chen (CHN) (XCE); Wu Zhifan (CHN) (XCE); Lü Xianjing (CHN) (XCC); Wu Zhifan (CHN) (XCC)	Yuan Jinwei (CHN) (XCE); Liang Zhenglan (CHN) (XCE); Wang Sheng (CHN) (XCC); Liang Zhenglan (CHN) (XCC)	Xie Guangchao (CHN) (XCE); Wen Youfeng (CHN) (XCE); Yuan Jinwei (CHN) (XCC); Wang Ting (CHN) (XCC)	
25–26 July	French Cup #1 - EE-MTBET #4 - EDR/E-EDR	(France) Méribel	3	Marius Tenet (FRA) (EDR); Charlotte Rey (FRA) (EDR); Théo Ruhlmann (FRA) (E-EDR); Helen Weber (GER) (E-EDR)	Melvin Almueis (FRA) (EDR); Lily Planquart (FRA) (EDR); Lévy Batista (FRA) (E-EDR); Claire Chabbert (FRA) (E-EDR)	Quantin Duvalet (FRA) (EDR); Laura Simonin (FRA) (EDR); Andrea Garibbo (ITA) (E-EDR); George Swift (NZL) (E-EDR)	
7–8 August	Course VTT Chantal Biya	(Cameroon) Abong-Mbang	3	Ibrahim Essabahy (MAR); Martha Ntakirutimana (RWA)	Jurre van Nederpelt (NED); Charlotte Iragena (RWA)	Bukhari Banzi (RWA); Rita Mafoma (CMR)	
9 August	Vittoria-Fischer MTB-Cup: Schötz	(Switzerland) Schötz	3	Joris Ryf (SUI); Noëlle Buri (SUI)	Leon Fischer (SUI); Chloe Tschumi (SUI)	Yannis Musy (FRA); Jana Glaus (SUI)	
20–23 August	Siol International Mountain Bike Challenge - XCC/XCE	(Malaysia) Kuching	3	Phunsiri Sirimongkhon (THA) (XCE); Dela Anjar Wulan (INA) (XCE); Tatsuumi Soejima (JPN) (XCC); Yui Ishida (JPN) (XCC)	Ihza Muhammad (INA) (XCE); Tsai Ya–yu (TPE) (XCE); Denis Sergiyenko (KAZ) (XCC); Tsai Ya–yu (TPE) (XCC)	Saniy Syu'aib Mohd Safiee (MAS) (XCE); Maria Sherstiuk (UKR) (XCE); Sho Takahashi (JPN) (XCC); Tatyana Geneleva (KAZ) (XCC)	
20–23 August	Mont-Saint-Anne XCO & XCC	(Canada) Beaupré	3	Mathis Duval (CAN) (XCO); Maude Ruelland (CAN) (XCO); Tristan Taillefer (CAN) (XCC); Léa Bouchard (CAN) (XCC)	Félix-Antoine Leclair (CAN) (XCO); Marie-Fay St-Onge (CAN) (XCO); Mathis Duval (CAN) (XCC); Maude Ruelland (CAN) (XCC)	Tristan Taillefer (CAN) (XCO); Catryana Marcotte (CAN) (XCO); Félix-Antoine Leclair (CAN) (XCC); Anne-Marie Gauthier (CAN) (XCC)	
23 August	Vittoria-Fischer MTB Cup	(Switzerland) Hägglingen	3	Leon Fischer (SUI); Cristel Hubacher (SUI)	Gian Bütikofer (SUI); Faranak Partoazar (IRI)	Laurys Laurent (FRA); Johanna Roth (SUI)	
28 August	4X Pro Tour	(Italy) Val di Sole	3	Tomáš Slavík (CZE); Josie McFall (GBR)	Davide Cappello (ITA); Zuri Acheson (AUS)	Neko Mulally (USA); Jessica Dove (GBR)	
29–30 August	CHILI 3 Länder - EE-MTBET #5 - E-EDR	(Austria) Nauders	3	Théo Ruhlmann (FRA); Helen Weber (GER)	Kelan Grant (IRL); Claire Chabbert (FRA)	Mathieu Chiarini (FRA); George Swift (NZL)	
4–6 September	Internazionali d'Italia - DH Rider Cup	(Italy) Madesimo	3	Gregorio Arnoul (ITA); Lisa Gava (ITA)	Jan Laner (ITA); Alia Marcellini (ITA)	Davide Palazzari (ITA); Sofia Delbono (ITA)	
5 September	City Mountainbike Eliminator Series - XCE/XCC	(Belgium) Olen	3	Jakob Klemenčič (SLO) (XCE); Adéla Pernická (CZE) (XCE); Jarne Vandersteen (BEL) (XCC); Adéla Pernická (CZE) (XCC)	Simon Gegenheimer (GER) (XCE); Margaux Borrelly (FRA) (XCE); Jakob Klemenčič (SLO) (XCC); Margaux Borrelly (FRA) (XCC)	Romain Covarel (FRA) (XCE); Elena Dal Ben (ITA) (XCE); Zinni Van Looy (BEL) (XCC); Elena Dal Ben (ITA) (XCC)	
19 September	City Mountainbike Eliminator Series - XCE/ XCC	(Spain) Girona	3	Alberto Mingorance (ESP) (XCE); Marion Fromberger (GER) (XCE); Jarne Vandersteen (BEL) (XCC); Marion Fromberger (GER) (XCC)	Edvin Lindh (SWE) (XCE); Margaux Borrelly (FRA) (XCE); Edvin Lindh (SWE) (XCC); Margaux Borrelly (FRA) (XCC)	Killian Hampiaux (FRA) (XCE); Cynthia Boivinet (FRA) (XCE); Alberto Mingorance (ESP) (XCC); Ainara Elbusto (ESP) (XCC)	
19–20 September	French Cup #2 - EE-MTBET #6 - EDR/E-EDR	(France) Bagnères-de-Luchon	3	Albin Cambos (FRA) (EDR); Charlotte Rey (FRA) (EDR); Emeric Ienzer (FRA) (E-EDR); Helen Weber (GER) (E-EDR)	Melvin Almueis (FRA) (EDR); Lily Planquart (FRA) (EDR); Diego Giordanengo (FRA) (E-EDR); Claire Chabbert (FRA) (E-EDR)	Hugo Marti Montessinos (FRA) (EDR); Lily-Rose Mathevon (FRA) (EDR); Kelan Grant (IRL) (E-EDR); George Swift (NZL) (E-EDR)	
26 September	XCC Metković	(Croatia) Metković	3	Lukas Hatz (AUT); Lejla Njemčević (BIH)	Maks Alfred Barret Maunz (AUT); Gabriela Wojtyła (POL)	Yoav Lifshitz (ISR); Naama Noyman (ISR)	
26–27 September	Coupe du Japon Misaka International	(Japan) Shimonoseki	3	Issei Matsumoto (JPN) (XCC); Shagne Paula Yaoyao (PHI) (XCC); Ryo Takeuchi (JPN) (XCO); Shagne Paula Yaoyao (PHI) (XCO)	Ryo Takeuchi (JPN) (XCC); Adel Pia Sendrijas (PHI) (XCC); Issei Matsumoto (JPN) (XCO); Chihane Kitatsuru (JPN) (XCO)	Yuta Uchino (JPN) (XCC); Maiha Takemura (JPN) (XCC); Yuta Uchino (JPN) (XCO); Adel Pia Sendrijas (PHI) (XCO)	
27 September	24° La Dario Acquaroli Internazionale	(Italy) Iseo	3	Stefano Goria (ITA); Claudia Peretti (ITA)	Fabio Bassignana (ITA); Maria Cristina Nisi (ITA)	Jacopo Billi (ITA); Marika Celestino (ITA)	
4 October	City Mountainbike Eliminator Series - XCC/XCE	Gibraltar	3	Jakob Klemenčič (SLO) (XCE); Marion Fromberger (GER) (XCE); Jakob Klemenčič (SLO) (XCC); Marion Fromberger (GER) (XCC)	Killian Hampiaux (FRA) (XCE); Margaux Borrelly (FRA) (XCE); Killian Hampiaux (FRA) (XCC); Elodie Kuijper (NED) (XCC)	Zinni Van Looy (BEL) (XCE); Lora Oravecz (HUN) (XCE); Zinni Van Looy (BEL) (XCC); Margaux Borrelly (FRA) (XCC)	
11 October	Hellenic National XC #4	(Greece) Kassandra	3	Konstantinos Berdempes (GRE); Athina Tzoulaki (GRE)	Alexandros Athanasiadis (GRE); Eirini Maria Karousou (GRE)	Charoun Molla (GRE); Aikaterni Eleftheriadou (GRE)	
16–18 October	Red Bull Hardline British Columbia	(Canada) Vancouver	3	Asa Vermette (USA); Gracey Hemstreet (CAN)	Lachlan Stevens-McNab (NZL); Tayte Proulx-Royds (CAN)	Oli Clark (NZL); Only two riders	
17–18 October	Coupe Du Japon Kumamaoto Yoshimuta International	(Japan) Mifune	3	Tatsuumi Soejima (JPN) (XCC); Yui Ishida (JPN) (XCC); Tatsuumi Soejima (JPN) (XCO); Yui Ishida (JPN) (XCO)	Ari Hirabayashi (JPN) (XCC); Yuki Mori (JPN) (XCC); Chun Seong-hun (KOR) (XCO); Yuki Mori (JPN) (XCO)	Asahi Miyazu (JPN) (XCC); Shagne Paula Yaoyao (PHI) (XCC); Asahi Miyazu (JPN) (XCO); Chihane Kitatsuru (JPN) (XCO)	

=== Stage Hors Class (SHC) ===
Date	Race Name	Location	Class	Winner	Second	Third	Ref
5–8 February	Mediterranean Epic MTB By Scott – XCMS	(Spain) Oropesa del Mar	SHC	David Valero (ESP); Natalia Fischer (ESP)	Wout Alleman (BEL); Rosa van Doorn (NED)	Luca Martin (FRA); Hannah Otto (USA)	
23–28 February	Andalucia Bike Race by Garmin – XCMS	(Spain) Granada, Jaén, Córdoba	SHC	Marc Stutzmann (SUI); David Valero (ESP); Natalia Fischer (ESP); Claudia Peretti (ITA)	Héctor Leonardo Páez (COL); Dario Cherchi (ITA); Adelheid Morath (GER); Sandra Mairhofer (ITA)	Davide Foccoli (ITA); Gianantonio Mazzola (ITA); Mónica Calderon (COL); Tessa Kortekaas (NED)	
15–22 March	Absa Cape Epic - XCMS	(South Africa) Cape Town	SHC	Matthew Beers (RSA); Tristan Nortje (RSA); Candice Lill (RSA); Alessandra Keller (SUI)	Luca Braidot (ITA); Simone Avondetto (ITA); Hayley Preen (RSA); Haley Smith (CAN)	Luca Schwarzbauer (GER); Sam Gaze (NZL); Katažina Sosna (LTU); Giorgia Marchet (ITA)	
17–19 April	MTB French Cup - XCO/XCC	(France) Monts de Guéret	HC	Mathis Azzaro (FRA) (XCO); Martina Berta (ITA) (XCO); Luca Martin (FRA) (XCC); Jenny Rissveds (SWE) (XCC)	Luca Martin (FRA) (XCO); Jenny Rissveds (SWE) (XCO); Jordan Sarrou (FRA) (XCC); Martina Berta (ITA) (XCC)	Jordan Sarrou (FRA) (XCO); Ronja Eibl (GER) (XCO); Naël Rouffiac (FRA) (XCC); Vida Lopez De San Roman (USA) (XCC)	

=== Stage Class 1 (S1) ===
Date	Race Name	Location	Class	Winner	Second	Third	Ref
5–8 February	Momentum Medical Scheme Tankwa Trek Presented By Biogen – XCMS	(South Africa) Ceres	S1	Andreas Seewald (GER); Jakob Hartmann (GER); Greta Seiwald (ITA); Sara Cortinovis (ITA)	Wessel Botha (RSA); Johann van Zyl (RSA); Vera Looser (NAM); Samantha Sanders (RSA)	Travis Stedman (RSA); Jaedon Terlouw (RSA); Cherise Willeit (RSA); Ila Stow (RSA)	
14–18 April	4 Islands Epic - XCMS	(Croatia) Baška, Cres, Unije, Lošinj	S1	Wout Alleman (BEL); Martin Stošek (CZE); Katažina Sosna (LTU); Giorgia Marchet (ITA)	Georg Egger (GER); Lukas Baum (GER); Anna Weinbeer (SUI); Tanja Priller (GER)	Marc Stutzmann (SUI); Samuele Porro (ITA); Maria Zarantonello (ITA); Chrystelle Baumann (SUI)	
18–21 June	Alpentour Trophy - XCMS	(Austria) Schladming	S1	Jakob Hartmann (GER); Tanja Priller (GER)	Tim Smeenge (NED); Nina Mosser (AUT)	Lorenzo Samparisi (ITA); Bianca Somavilla (AUT)	
25–28 June	Colina Triste - XCMS	(Spain) Burgos, Santo Domingo de Silos, Covarrubias	S1	José Dias (POR); Natalia Fischer (ESP)	Luis Francisco Pérez (ESP); Sofia Rodríguez (ESP)	Raúl Castrillo (ESP); Lucía González Blanco (ESP)	
2–5 July	Andorra Epic - Pyrenees - XCMS	(Andorra) La Massana	S1	Davide Foccoli (ITA); Stefano Goria (ITA); Mónica Calderon (COL); Costanza Fasolis (ITA)	David Valero (ESP); Samuele Porro (ITA); Maria Zarantonello (ITA); Chrystelle Baumann (SUI)	Simon Stiebjahn (GER); Martin Frey (GER); Katažina Sosna (LTU); Giorgia Marchet (ITA)	
13–17 July	Transmaurienne Vanoise - XCMS	(France) Val-Cenis	S1	Sascha Weber (GER); Margot Moschetti (FRA)	Thomas Garnier (BEL); Stefanie Zahno (SUI)	Micha Klötzli (SUI); Sandra Stadelmann (SUI)	
19–23 August	Swiss Epic - XCMS	(Switzerland) Davos–Engadin	S1	Fadri Barandun (SUI); Andrin Beeli (SUI); Anna Weinbeer (SUI); Claudia Peretti (ITA)	Davide Foccoli (ITA); Stefano Goria (ITA); Katažina Sosna (LTU); Giorgia Marchet (ITA)	Gioele De Cosmo (ITA); Jakob Dorigoni (ITA); Tessa Kortekaas (NED); Amanda Bohlin (SWE)	
3–6 September	Club La Santa 4 Stage MTBLanzarote - XCMS	(Spain) Lanzarote	S1	Kristian Andersen (DEN); Tessa Kortekaas (NED)	Luis León Sánchez (ESP); Alba Teruel Ribes (ESP)	Ismael Ventura (ESP); Clàudia Galicia Cotrina (ESP)	
22–26 September	Momentum Medical Scheme Cape Pioneer Presented By Biogen - XCMS	(South Africa) Oudtshoorn	S1	Marc Pritzen (RSA); Félix Stehli (SUI); Samantha Sanders (RSA); Sarah Maré (RSA)	Wessel Botha (RSA); Jan Withaar (RSA); Lilian Baber (RSA); Chloe Bishop (RSA)	Lood Goosen (RSA); Ignatius du Preez (RSA); Bianca Botha (RSA); Rachel Seaman (RSA)	
10–17 October	Brasil Ride Paraíba - XCMS	(Brazil) João Pessoa	S1	Tiago Ferreira (POR); Luiza Euzébio de Souza (BRA)	Gerard Blanch (ESP); Gabriele Eduarda Krol (BRA)	Hans Becking (NED); Liege Walter (BRA)	
14–17 October	Bara Epic Israel - XCMS	(Israel) Nahsholim	S1	Tomer Zaltsman (ISR); Tomer Caspi (ISR); Luba Berenstein (ISR); Helen Mora (ISR)	Yoav Lifshitz (ISR); Edo Goldstein (ISR); Tal Nativ (ISR); Netaly Rahamim (ISR)	Victor Enev (BUL); Eliad Daniel (ISR); Nasreen Karawy (ISR); Abeer Dirawi (ISR)	
5–15 November	FNB Wines2Whales - XCMS	(South Africa) Somerset West	S1	Jaedon Terlouw (RSA); Tristan Nortje (RSA); Samantha Sanders (RSA); Alexis Segard (FRA)	Lood Goosen (RSA); Ignatius du Preez (RSA); Giorgia Marchet (ITA); Katažina Sosna (LTU)	Hans Becking (NED); Teus Ruijter (NED); Sarah Maré (RSA); Lilian Baber (RSA)	

=== Stage Class 2 (S2) ===
Date	Race Name	Location	Class	Winner	Second	Third	Ref
15–18 January	Racenature Albufeira – XCMS	(Portugal) Albufeira	S2	Filipe Francisco (POR); Melissa Maia (POR)	Tim Smeenge (NED); Lola Bakker (NED)	Roberto Ferreira (POR); Kim Baptista (GBR)	
29 January – 1 February	V La Leyenda De Tartessos – XCMS	(Spain) Huelva	S2	David González Tirado (ESP); Miguel Muñoz Moreno (ESP); María Reyes Murillo (ESP); Natalia Fischer (ESP)	José Dias (POR); Sebastián Gesche (CHI); Martina Krahulcová (SVK); Janka Keseg Števková (SVK)	Raul Castrillo (ESP); Ismael Esteban (ESP); Maria Isabel Dávila (ESP); Carmen Martín Baena (ESP)	
29 January – 1 February	Costa Blanca Bike Race – XCMS	(Spain) Calpe	S2	Østen Brovold Midtsundstad (NOR); Amanda Bohlin (SWE)	Christopher Dawson (IRL); Chrystelle Baumann (SUI)	Mats Tubaas Glende (NOR); Klaudia Czabok (POL)	
6–9 May	sani2c Race - XCMS	(South Africa) Underberg–Scottburgh	S2	Travis Stedman (RSA); Jaedon Terlouw (RSA); Samantha Sanders (RSA); Vera Looser (NAM)	Arno du Toit (RSA); Wessel Botha (RSA); Ila Stow (RSA); Cherise Willeit (RSA)	Marco Joubert (RSA); Tristan Nortje (RSA); Frances Janse van Rensburg (RSA); Rachel Seaman (RSA)	
14–17 May	Transgrancanaria Bike - XCMS	(Spain) Las Palmas	S2	Hans Becking (NED); Tessa Kortekaas (NED)	Luis Ángel Maté (ESP); Sophie Giovane (FRA)	Pedro Rodríguez Mesa (ESP); Manuela Mureșan (ROU)	
3–6 September	Volta a Galicia BTT - XCMS	(Spain) Lalín	S2	Alejandro García Vázquez (ESP); Tamara Seijas (ESP)	Miguel Muñoz Moreno (ESP); Maria Reyes Murillo (ESP)	Francisco Herrero Casas (ESP); Noa Rodríguez Sobrado (ESP)	
12–15 November	Transvulcania Bike La Palma - XMCS	(Spain) La Palma	S2	Pedro Rodríguez Mesa (ESP); Janka Keseg Števková (SVK)	Ismael Ventura (ESP); Tessa Kortekaas (NED)	Sébastien Burnet (FRA); Bettina Janas (GER)	

== 2026 UCI Mountain Bike World Cup (CDM) ==
=== XCO ===
Date	Venue	Podium (Men)		Podium (Women)	
3 May 2026	South Korea; Mona Yongpyong	1	(Switzerland) Dario Lillo	1	(Switzerland) Sina Frei
3 May 2026	South Korea; Mona Yongpyong	2	(France) Luca Martin	2	(Sweden) Jenny Rissveds
3 May 2026	South Korea; Mona Yongpyong	3	(United Kingdom) Charlie Aldridge	3	(United States) Madigan Munro
23 May 2026	Czech Republic; Nové Město na Moravě	1	(United Kingdom) Tom Pidcock	1	(Austria) Laura Stigger
23 May 2026	Czech Republic; Nové Město na Moravě	2	(France) Luca Martin	2	(Sweden) Jenny Rissveds
23 May 2026	Czech Republic; Nové Město na Moravě	3	(Switzerland) Filippo Colombo	3	(Switzerland) Sina Frei
14 June 2026	Austria; Leogang	1	(France) Adrien Boichis	1	(Sweden) Jenny Rissveds
14 June 2026	Austria; Leogang	2	(France) Luca Martin	2	(Netherlands) Puck Pieterse
14 June 2026	Austria; Leogang	3	(United States) Bjorn Riley	3	(Switzerland) Alessandra Keller
20 June 2026	Switzerland; Lenzerheide	1	(France) Luca Martin	1	(Sweden) Jenny Rissveds
20 June 2026	Switzerland; Lenzerheide	2	(France) Adrien Boichis	2	(Switzerland) Ronja Blöchlinger
20 June 2026	Switzerland; Lenzerheide	3	(United States) Bjorn Riley	3	(United States) Savilia Blunk
5 July 2026	Italy; La Thuile	1	(France) Luca Martin	1	(Italy) Martina Berta
5 July 2026	Italy; La Thuile	2	(France) Mathis Azzaro	2	(United States) Savilia Blunk
5 July 2026	Italy; La Thuile	3	(France) Adrien Boichis	3	(Austria) Laura Stigger
12 July 2026	Andorra; Arinsal	1	(France) Adrien Boichis	1	(Sweden) Jenny Rissveds
12 July 2026	Andorra; Arinsal	2	(France) Mathis Azzaro	2	(Italy) Martina Berta
12 July 2026	Andorra; Arinsal	3	(Germany) Luca Schwarzbauer	3	(Switzerland) Sina Frei
23 August 2026	France; Haute-Savoie	1	(France) Adrien Boichis	1	(Switzerland) Sina Frei
23 August 2026	France; Haute-Savoie	2	(Netherlands) Mathieu van der Poel	2	(Sweden) Jenny Rissveds
23 August 2026	France; Haute-Savoie	3	(Chile) Martín Vidaurre	3	(United States) Savilia Blunk
20 September 2026	United States; Soldier Hollow	1	(Chile) Martín Vidaurre	1	(Italy) Martina Berta
20 September 2026	United States; Soldier Hollow	2	(Canada) Cole Punchard	2	(United States) Gwendalyn Gibson
20 September 2026	United States; Soldier Hollow	3	(France) Mathis Guay	3	(Switzerland) Sina Frei
4 October 2026	United States; Lake Placid	1	(United Kingdom) Charlie Aldridge	1	(Switzerland) Sina Frei
4 October 2026	United States; Lake Placid	2	(Switzerland) Filippo Colombo	2	(Italy) Martina Berta
4 October 2026	United States; Lake Placid	3	(Chile) Martín Vidaurre	3	(New Zealand) Sammie Maxwell

=== Short Track ===
Date	Venue	Podium (Men)		Podium (Women)	
1 May 2026	South Korea; Mona Yongpyong	1	(France) Mathis Azzaro	1	(Switzerland) Sina Frei
1 May 2026	South Korea; Mona Yongpyong	2	(Italy) Simone Avondetto	2	(United Kingdom) Evie Richards
1 May 2026	South Korea; Mona Yongpyong	3	(Switzerland) Dario Lillo	3	(Italy) Martina Berta
23 May 2026	Czech Republic; Nové Město na Moravě	1	(France) Mathis Azzaro	1	(Netherlands) Puck Pieterse
23 May 2026	Czech Republic; Nové Město na Moravě	2	(United Kingdom) Tom Pidcock	2	(Austria) Laura Stigger
23 May 2026	Czech Republic; Nové Město na Moravě	3	(Switzerland) Dario Lillo	3	(Switzerland) Nicole Koller
12 June 2026	Austria; Leogang	1	(Denmark) Simon Andreassen	1	(Switzerland) Sina Frei
12 June 2026	Austria; Leogang	2	(Switzerland) Filippo Colombo	2	(Sweden) Jenny Rissveds
12 June 2026	Austria; Leogang	3	(France) Luca Martin	3	(Switzerland) Alessandra Keller
20 June 2026	Switzerland; Lenzerheide	1	(France) Adrien Boichis	1	(United States) Savilia Blunk
20 June 2026	Switzerland; Lenzerheide	2	(France) Luca Martin	2	(Switzerland) Ronja Blöchlinger
20 June 2026	Switzerland; Lenzerheide	3	(United States) Bjorn Riley	3	(Switzerland) Alessandra Keller
5 July 2026	Italy; La Thuile	1	(France) Adrien Boichis	1	(Sweden) Jenny Rissveds
5 July 2026	Italy; La Thuile	2	(France) Luca Martin	2	(Switzerland) Sina Frei
5 July 2026	Italy; La Thuile	3	(United Kingdom) Charlie Aldridge	3	(United States) Savilia Blunk
10 July 2026	Andorra; Arinsal	1	(United States) Bjorn Riley	1	(Sweden) Jenny Rissveds
10 July 2026	Andorra; Arinsal	2	(France) Adrien Boichis	2	(Austria) Laura Stigger
10 July 2026	Andorra; Arinsal	3	(United States) Christopher Blevins	3	(Switzerland) Ronja Blöchlinger
21 August 2026	France; Haute-Savoie	1	(France) Adrien Boichis	1	(Switzerland) Sina Frei
21 August 2026	France; Haute-Savoie	2	(France) Luca Martin	2	(Sweden) Jenny Rissveds
21 August 2026	France; Haute-Savoie	3	(Germany) David List	3	(United States) Savilia Blunk
20 September 2026	United States; Soldier Hollow	1	(New Zealand) Sam Gaze	1	(Italy) Martina Berta
20 September 2026	United States; Soldier Hollow	2	(France) Luca Martin	2	(Switzerland) Alessandra Keller
20 September 2026	United States; Soldier Hollow	3	(United Kingdom) Charlie Aldridge	3	(Switzerland) Sina Frei
3 October 2026	United States; Lake Placid	1	(Chile) Martín Vidaurre	1	(Italy) Martina Berta
3 October 2026	United States; Lake Placid	2	(Germany) Luca Schwarzbauer	2	(Sweden) Jenny Rissveds
3 October 2026	United States; Lake Placid	3	(Switzerland) Filippo Colombo	3	(Switzerland) Sina Frei

=== XCE ===
Date	Venue	Podium (Men)		Podium (Women)	
14 June 2026	Turkey; Sakarya	1	(Slovenia) Jakob Klemenčič	1	(Ukraine) Mariia Sukhopalova
14 June 2026	Turkey; Sakarya	2	(Austria) Theo Hauser	2	(Germany) Marion Fromberger
14 June 2026	Turkey; Sakarya	3	(Romania) Máté Szakács	3	(Netherlands) Didi de Vries
27 June 2026	Poland; Gdynia	1	(Slovenia) Matic Kranjec Žagar	1	(Ukraine) Mariia Sukhopalova
27 June 2026	Poland; Gdynia	2	(Germany) Simon Gegenheimer	2	(Germany) Marion Fromberger
27 June 2026	Poland; Gdynia	3	(Romania) Ede-Károly Molnár	3	(Netherlands) Didi de Vries
11 July 2026	Germany; Aalen	1	(Slovenia) Jakob Klemenčič	1	(Italy) Gaia Tormena
11 July 2026	Germany; Aalen	2	(Austria) Theo Hauser	2	(Germany) Marion Fromberger
11 July 2026	Germany; Aalen	3	(Belgium) Jarne Vandersteen	3	(Ukraine) Mariia Sukhopalova

=== Downhill ===
Date	Venue	Podium (Men)		Podium (Women)	
2 May 2026	South Korea; Mona Yongpyong	1	(United States) Asa Vermette	1	(Austria) Valentina Höll
2 May 2026	South Korea; Mona Yongpyong	2	(France) Loïc Bruni	2	(Italy) Gloria Scarsi
2 May 2026	South Korea; Mona Yongpyong	3	(France) Amaury Pierron	3	(France) Myriam Nicole
29–31 May 2026	France; Peyragudes	1	(United States) Luca Shaw	1	(Austria) Valentina Höll
29–31 May 2026	France; Peyragudes	2	(France) Benoît Coulanges	2	(Canada) Gracey Hemstreet
29–31 May 2026	France; Peyragudes	3	(United Kingdom) Jordan Williams	3	(Switzerland) Lisa Baumann
13 June 2026	Austria; Leogang	1	(Canada) Finn Iles	1	(Austria) Valentina Höll
13 June 2026	Austria; Leogang	2	(France) Amaury Pierron	2	(France) Marine Cabirou
13 June 2026	Austria; Leogang	3	(Germany) Henri Kiefer	3	(United States) Anna Newkirk
19–20 June 2026	Switzerland; Lenzerheide	1	(Canada) Finn Iles	1	(United States) Anna Newkirk
19–20 June 2026	Switzerland; Lenzerheide	2	(France) Amaury Pierron	2	(Switzerland) Lisa Baumann
19–20 June 2026	Switzerland; Lenzerheide	3	(United States) Asa Vermette	3	(Italy) Gloria Scarsi
4–5 July 2026	Italy; La Thuile	1	(United Kingdom) Jordan Williams	1	(Austria) Valentina Höll
4–5 July 2026	Italy; La Thuile	2	(United States) Asa Vermette	2	(Switzerland) Lisa Baumann
4–5 July 2026	Italy; La Thuile	3	(Canada) Jackson Goldstone	3	(New Zealand) Sacha Earnest
10–11 July 2026	Andorra; Arinsal	1	(United Kingdom) Jordan Williams	1	(Austria) Valentina Höll
10–11 July 2026	Andorra; Arinsal	2	(United Kingdom) Reece Wilson	2	(Canada) Gracey Hemstreet
10–11 July 2026	Andorra; Arinsal	3	(United States) Ryan Pinkerton	3	(New Zealand) Sacha Earnest
22–23 August 2026	France; Haute-Savoie	1	(France) Max Alran	1	(United Kingdom) Harriet Harnden
22–23 August 2026	France; Haute-Savoie	2	(Austria) Andreas Kolb	2	(France) Marine Cabirou
22–23 August 2026	France; Haute-Savoie	3	(Canada) Jackson Goldstone	3	(Austria) Valentina Höll
25–27 September 2026	Canada; Whistler	1	(United States) Asa Vermette	1	(Austria) Valentina Höll
25–27 September 2026	Canada; Whistler	2	(France) Max Alran	2	(Canada) Gracey Hemstreet
25–27 September 2026	Canada; Whistler	3	(France) Amaury Pierron	3	(France) Lisa Bouladou
3–4 October 2026	United States; Lake Placid	1	(Australia) Luke Meier-Smith	1	(France) Lisa Bouladou
3–4 October 2026	United States; Lake Placid	2	(Austria) Andreas Kolb	2	(Austria) Valentina Höll
3–4 October 2026	United States; Lake Placid	3	(New Zealand) Lachlan Stevens-McNab	3	(United Kingdom) Tahnée Seagrave

=== Enduro ===
Date	Venue	Podium (Men)		Podium (Women)	
29–31 May 2026	France; Peyragudes	1	(France) Alex Rudeau	1	(United Kingdom) Ella Conolly
29–31 May 2026	France; Peyragudes	2	(France) Raphaël Giambi	2	(France) Mélanie Pugin
29–31 May 2026	France; Peyragudes	3	(Australia) Ryan Gilchrist	3	(Germany) Raphaela Richter
12–14 June 2026	Austria; Leogang	1	(Poland) Sławomir Łukasik	1	(New Zealand) Winnifred Goldsbury
12–14 June 2026	Austria; Leogang	2	(Canada) Leif Rogers	2	(United Kingdom) Ella Conolly
12–14 June 2026	Austria; Leogang	3	(France) Marius Tenet	3	(France) Mélanie Pugin
26–28 June 2026	Italy; Fassa Valley	1	(Netherlands) Tristan Botteram	1	(France) Mélanie Pugin
26–28 June 2026	Italy; Fassa Valley	2	(Italy) Tommaso Calonaci	2	(United Kingdom) Ella Conolly
26–28 June 2026	Italy; Fassa Valley	3	(Italy) Tommaso Francardo	3	(New Zealand) Winnifred Goldsbury
5 July 2026	Italy; La Thuile	1	(France) Raphaël Giambi	1	(United Kingdom) Ella Conolly
5 July 2026	Italy; La Thuile	2	(France) Adrien Dailly	2	(France) Mélanie Pugin
5 July 2026	Italy; La Thuile	3	(France) Alex Rudeau	3	(Germany) Raphaela Richter
19 July 2026	Switzerland; Bellwald	1	(Australia) Ryan Gilchrist	1	(United Kingdom) Ella Conolly
19 July 2026	Switzerland; Bellwald	2	(Canada) Lief Rodgers	2	(Canada) Elly Hoskin
19 July 2026	Switzerland; Bellwald	3	(France) Adrien Dailly	3	(Italy) Nadine Ellecosta
16 August 2026	France; Haute-Savoie	1	(France) Adrien Dailly	1	(France) Morgane Charre
16 August 2026	France; Haute-Savoie	2	(Finland) Tarmo Ryynänen	2	(Italy) Nadine Ellecosta
16 August 2026	France; Haute-Savoie	3	(Belgium) Gabriel Sainthuile	3	(Germany) Helen Weber

=== Marathon ===
Date	Venue	Podium (Men)		Podium (Women)	
21 February 2026	Spain; Calpe	1	(Belgium) Wout Alleman	1	(Switzerland) Anna Weinbeer
21 February 2026	Spain; Calpe	2	(Germany) Andreas Seewald	2	(Spain) Natalia Fischer
21 February 2026	Spain; Calpe	3	(Spain) David Valero	3	(Netherlands) Rosa van Doorn
9 May 2026	Italy; Capoliveri	1	(Italy) Jakob Dorigoni	1	(Switzerland) Anna Weinbeer
9 May 2026	Italy; Capoliveri	2	(Italy) Stefano Goria	2	(Spain) Natalia Fischer
9 May 2026	Italy; Capoliveri	3	(Italy) Gioele de Cosmo	3	(Bosnia and Herzegovina) Lejla Njemčević
31 May 2026	Andorra; Sant Julià de Lòria	1	(Spain) David Valero	1	(Switzerland) Anna Weinbeer
31 May 2026	Andorra; Sant Julià de Lòria	2	(Colombia) Héctor Leonardo Páez	2	(Spain) Natalia Fischer
31 May 2026	Andorra; Sant Julià de Lòria	3	(Mexico) Gerardo Ulloa	3	(Italy) Claudia Peretti
13 June 2026	Italy; Sëlva	1	(Spain) David Valero	1	(Italy) Claudia Peretti
13 June 2026	Italy; Sëlva	2	(Italy) Diego Rosa	2	(Netherlands) Rosa van Doorn
13 June 2026	Italy; Sëlva	3	(Netherlands) Tim Smeenge	3	(Poland) Paula Gorycka
26 July 2026	Germany; Kirchzarten	1	(Belgium) Wout Alleman	1	(Switzerland) Anna Weinbeer
26 July 2026	Germany; Kirchzarten	2	(Spain) David Valero	2	(Spain) Natalia Fischer
26 July 2026	Germany; Kirchzarten	3	(Italy) Davide Foccoli	3	(Italy) Claudia Peretti
20 September 2026	Spain; Girona	1	(Spain) David Valero	1	(Switzerland) Anna Weinbeer
20 September 2026	Spain; Girona	2	(Germany) Andreas Seewald	2	(Italy) Claudia Peretti
20 September 2026	Spain; Girona	3	(Norway) Eskil Evensen-Lie	3	(Spain) Natalia Fischer

== World Championships (CM) ==
=== XCO ===
Date	Venue	Podium (Men)		Podium (Women)	
XCO; 30 August 2026	Italy; Val di Sole	1	(United Kingdom) Tom Pidcock	1	(Switzerland) Sina Frei
XCO; 30 August 2026	Italy; Val di Sole	2	(United Kingdom) Charlie Aldridge	2	(Italy) Martina Berta
XCO; 30 August 2026	Italy; Val di Sole	3	(Canada) Cole Punchard	3	(Switzerland) Nicole Koller

=== XCC ===
Date	Venue	Podium (Men)		Podium (Women)	
XCC; 29 August 2026	Italy; Val di Sole	1	(France) Adrien Boichis	1	(Austria) Laura Stigger
XCC; 29 August 2026	Italy; Val di Sole	2	(United Kingdom) Charlie Aldridge	2	(United Kingdom) Evie Richards
XCC; 29 August 2026	Italy; Val di Sole	3	(France) Luca Martin	3	(Switzerland) Sina Frei

=== XCE ===
Date	Venue	Podium (Men)		Podium (Women)	
XCE; 18 April 2026	Spain; Barcelona	1	(France) Titouan Perrin-Ganier	1	(Italy) Gaia Tormena
XCE; 18 April 2026	Spain; Barcelona	2	(Sweden) Casper Casserstedt	2	(Ukraine) Mariia Sukhopalova
XCE; 18 April 2026	Spain; Barcelona	3	(Portugal) Ricardo Marinheiro	3	(France) Margaux Borrelly

=== XCM ===
Date	Venue	Podium (Men)		Podium (Women)	
XCM; 12 September 2026	Italy; Primiero San Martino di Castrozza	1	(Germany) Andreas Seewald	1	(Switzerland) Anna Weinbeer
XCM; 12 September 2026	Italy; Primiero San Martino di Castrozza	2	(Italy) Gioele De Cosmo	2	(Italy) Claudia Peretti
XCM; 12 September 2026	Italy; Primiero San Martino di Castrozza	3	(Italy) Jakob Dorigoni	3	(Austria) Mona Mitterwallner

=== E–XCO ===
Date	Venue	Podium (Men)		Podium (Women)	
E–XCO; 27 August 2026	Italy; Val di Sole	1	(France) Jérôme Gilloux	1	(Austria) Anna Spielmann
E–XCO; 27 August 2026	Italy; Val di Sole	2	(Switzerland) Joris Ryf	2	(Switzerland) Kathrin Stirnemann
E–XCO; 27 August 2026	Italy; Val di Sole	3	(France) Stéphane Tempier	3	(Austria) Tamara Wiedmann

=== DHI ===
Date	Venue	Podium (Men)		Podium (Women)	
DHI; 27–28 August 2026	Italy; Val di Sole	1	(Canada) Jackson Goldstone	1	(Austria) Valentina Höll
DHI; 27–28 August 2026	Italy; Val di Sole	2	(New Zealand) Lachlan McNabb	2	(Switzerland) Lisa Baumann
DHI; 27–28 August 2026	Italy; Val di Sole	3	(United Kingdom) Jordan Williams	3	(United Kingdom) Harriet Harnden

=== END ===
Date	Venue	Podium (Men)		Podium (Women)	
END; 18 October 2026	Italy; Finale Ligure	1	(Australia) Ryan Gilchrist	1	(Germany) Raphaela Richter
END; 18 October 2026	Italy; Finale Ligure	2	(Canada) Elliot Jamieson	2	(France) Isabeau Courdurier
END; 18 October 2026	Italy; Finale Ligure	3	(United States) Richie Rude Jr.	3	(Italy) Nadine Ellecosta

=== E–END ===
Date	Venue	Podium (Men)		Podium (Women)	
E–END; 17 October 2026	Italy; Finale Ligure	1	(France) Adrien Dailly	1	(Germany) Helen Weber
E–END; 17 October 2026	Italy; Finale Ligure	2	(France) Damien Oton	2	(France) Laura Charles
E–END; 17 October 2026	Italy; Finale Ligure	3	(Belgium) Martin Maes	3	(France) Estelle Charles

=== Pump–Track ===
Date	Venue	Podium (Men)		Podium (Women)	
PUM; 16–17 October 2026	China; Mentougou	1	(Netherlands) Jesse Elzenga	1	(Switzerland) Nadine Aeberhard
PUM; 16–17 October 2026	China; Mentougou	2	Ilya Beskrovnyy	2	(Czech Republic) Sabina Košárková
PUM; 16–17 October 2026	China; Mentougou	3	(Switzerland) Tristan Borel	3	(Latvia) Vineta Pētersone

=== Snow Bike ===
Date	Venue	Podium (Men)		Podium (Women)	
SNO; 7 February 2026	France; Châtel	1	(France) Pierre Thévenard (Super G) (France) Vincent Tupin (Dual Slalom)	1	(Switzerland) Lisa Baumann (Super G) (Switzerland) Lisa Baumann (Dual Slalom)
SNO; 7 February 2026	France; Châtel	2	(France) Vincent Tupin (Super G) (France) Cédric Gracia (Dual Slalom)	2	(France) Vicky Clavel (Super G) (France) Vicky Clavel (Dual Slalom)
SNO; 7 February 2026	France; Châtel	3	(France) Dylan Levesque (Super G) (France) Dylan Levesque (Dual Slalom)	3	(France) Morgane Such (Super G) (France) Morgane Such (Dual Slalom)

=== XCR ===
Date	Venue	Podium (Men)	
XCR; 26 August 2026	Italy; Val di Sole	1	Italy (ITA); Juri Zanotti; Paolo Costa; Martina Berta; Giorgia Pellizotti; Valentina Corvi; Fabio Bassignana
XCR; 26 August 2026	Italy; Val di Sole	2	Switzerland (SUI); Nicolas Halter; Men Gygax; Jolanda Neff; Anina Hutter; Anja Grossmann; Luca Schätti
XCR; 26 August 2026	Italy; Val di Sole	3	United States (USA); Nicholas Konecny; Noah Scholnick; Haley Batten; Aida Linton; Bailey Cioppa; Riley Amos

== Continental Championships (CC) ==
=== Americas ===
Date	Venue	Podium (Men)		Podium (Women)	
XCO; 15–19 April 2026	Paraguay; San Juan del Paraná	1	Gerardo Ulloa (MEX)	1	Catalina Vidaurre (CHI)
XCO; 15–19 April 2026	Paraguay; San Juan del Paraná	2	Ulan Bastos Galinski (BRA)	2	Raiza Goulão (BRA)
XCO; 15–19 April 2026	Paraguay; San Juan del Paraná	3	Alex Malacarne (BRA)	3	Karen Olímpio (BRA)

Date	Venue	Podium (Men)		Podium (Women)	
XCC; 15–19 April 2026	Paraguay; San Juan del Paraná	1	Gerardo Ulloa (MEX)	1	Karen Olímpio (BRA)
XCC; 15–19 April 2026	Paraguay; San Juan del Paraná	2	Catriel Soto (ARG)	2	Catalina Vidaurre (CHI)
XCC; 15–19 April 2026	Paraguay; San Juan del Paraná	3	Ulan Bastos Galinski (BRA)	3	Giuliana Salvini Morgen (BRA)

Date	Venue	Podium (Men)		Podium (Women)	
XCE; 15–19 April 2026	Paraguay; San Juan del Paraná	1	Luiz Cocuzzi (BRA)	1	Luiza Cocuzzi (BRA)
XCE; 15–19 April 2026	Paraguay; San Juan del Paraná	2	Nicolas Rafhael Amancio (BRA)	2	Iara Caetano Leite (BRA)
XCE; 15–19 April 2026	Paraguay; San Juan del Paraná	3	Lázaro Moreira (BRA)	3	Marcela Lima (BRA)

Date	Venue	Podium (Men)		Podium (Women)	
XCM; 15 November 2026	Argentina; Mar del Plata	1	Maximiliano Aiello (ARG)	1	Yesica Andrés (ARG)
XCM; 15 November 2026	Argentina; Mar del Plata	2	Flávio de Jesus Lobo Neto (BRA)	2	Luiza Euzebio de Souza (BRA)
XCM; 15 November 2026	Argentina; Mar del Plata	3	Sebastián Gesche (CHI)	3	Daniela Carrera (CHI)

Date	Venue	Podium	
XCR; 15–19 April 2026	Paraguay; San Juan del Paraná	1	Brazil (BRA); Leonardo Bernardes de Castro Filho; Karen Olímpio; Ulan Bastos Galinski; Luiza Cocuzzi; Eiki Leoncio; Angelina Santos da Silva
XCR; 15–19 April 2026	Paraguay; San Juan del Paraná	2	Chile (CHI); Catalina Vidaurre; Ignacio Gallo; Maximiliano San Martín; Antonia Rodríguez Ceppi; Florencia Monsàlvez; Guillermo Varas
XCR; 15–19 April 2026	Paraguay; San Juan del Paraná	3	Colombia (COL); Jhonnatan Botero; Angie Lara; Antonio Gómez; Daniela Gaviria; María Castro; Santiago Quintero Arango

Date	Venue	Podium (Men)		Podium (Women)	
DHI; 5–8 March 2026	Brazil; Sapiranga	1	Roger Vieira (BRA)	1	Larissa da Luz (BRA)
DHI; 5–8 March 2026	Brazil; Sapiranga	2	Leonardo Becher da Silva (BRA)	2	Valentina Roa (COL)
DHI; 5–8 March 2026	Brazil; Sapiranga	3	João Augusto Hodecker (BRA)	3	Catalina Calderón (ARG)

Date	Venue	Podium (Men)		Podium (Women)	
END; 11–12 July 2026	Guatemala; Antigua Guatemala	1	Juan Martínez Revolorio (GUA)	1	Ada Sánchez (MEX)
END; 11–12 July 2026	Guatemala; Antigua Guatemala	2	Guillermo Orantes Coronado (GUA)	2	Naomí Amoles (COL)
END; 11–12 July 2026	Guatemala; Antigua Guatemala	3	Kenneth Zamora Anderson (GUA)	3	Paola Barillas Sobalvarro (GUA)

Date	Venue	Podium (Men)		Podium (Women)	
E–END; 11–12 July 2026	Guatemala; Antigua Guatemala	1	Diego Amezcua Monreal (MEX)	1	—N/a
E–END; 11–12 July 2026	Guatemala; Antigua Guatemala	2	Hugo Martínez Corado (GUA)	2	—N/a
E–END; 11–12 July 2026	Guatemala; Antigua Guatemala	3	Guillermo Argueta Zelaya (HON)	3	—N/a

=== Asia ===
Date	Venue	Podium (Men)		Podium (Women)	
XCO; 23–27 June 2026	Uzbekistan; Tashkent	1	Riki Kitabayashi (JPN)	1	Wu Zhifan (CHN)
XCO; 23–27 June 2026	Uzbekistan; Tashkent	2	Denis Sergiyenko (KAZ)	2	Liang Zhenglan (CHN)
XCO; 23–27 June 2026	Uzbekistan; Tashkent	3	Yuan Jinwei (CHN)	3	Lei Ying (CHN)

Date	Venue	Podium (Men)		Podium (Women)	
XCC; 23–27 June 2026	Uzbekistan; Tashkent	1	Riki Kitabayashi (JPN)	1	Wu Zhifan (CHN)
XCC; 23–27 June 2026	Uzbekistan; Tashkent	2	Lü Xianjing (CHN)	2	Liang Zhenglan (CHN)
XCC; 23–27 June 2026	Uzbekistan; Tashkent	3	Yuan Jinwei (CHN)	3	Lei Ying (CHN)

Date	Venue	Podium (Men)		Podium (Women)	
XCE; 23–27 June 2026	Uzbekistan; Tashkent	1	Phunsiri Sirimongkhon (THA)	1	Liang Zhenglan (CHN)
XCE; 23–27 June 2026	Uzbekistan; Tashkent	2	Heo Seung–soo (KOR)	2	Lei Ying (CHN)
XCE; 23–27 June 2026	Uzbekistan; Tashkent	3	Riyadh Hakim (SIN)	3	Nguyễn Thị Huyền Trang (VIE)

Date	Venue	Podium	
XCR; 23–27 June 2026	Uzbekistan; Tashkent	1	China (CHN); Wang Sheng
XCR; 23–27 June 2026	Uzbekistan; Tashkent	2	Japan (JPN); Sho Takahashi
XCR; 23–27 June 2026	Uzbekistan; Tashkent	3	India (IND); Ashish Sherpa

Date	Venue	Podium (Men)		Podium (Women)	
DHI; 23–27 June 2026	Uzbekistan; Tashkent	1	Methasit Boonsane (THA)	1	Vipavee Deekaballes (THA)
DHI; 23–27 June 2026	Uzbekistan; Tashkent	2	Chiang Sheng-shan (TPE)	2	Milatul Khaqimah (INA)
DHI; 23–27 June 2026	Uzbekistan; Tashkent	3	Yuga Ikuta (JPN)	3	Naomi Gardoce (PHI)

=== Europe ===
Date	Venue	Podium			
XCO; 29 July – 2 August 2026	Switzerland; Monteceneri	1	Charlie Aldridge (GBR)	1	Sina Frei (SUI)
XCO; 29 July – 2 August 2026	Switzerland; Monteceneri	2	Juri Zanotti (ITA)	2	Alessandra Keller (SUI)
XCO; 29 July – 2 August 2026	Switzerland; Monteceneri	3	Fabio Püntener (SUI)	3	Jenny Rissveds (SWE)

Date	Venue	Podium			
XCC; 29 July – 2 August 2026	Switzerland; Monteceneri	1	Charlie Aldridge (GBR)	1	Sina Frei (SUI)
XCC; 29 July – 2 August 2026	Switzerland; Monteceneri	2	Juri Zanotti (ITA)	2	Alessandra Keller (SUI)
XCC; 29 July – 2 August 2026	Switzerland; Monteceneri	3	Dario Lillo (SUI)	3	Jenny Rissveds (SWE)

Date	Venue	Podium (Men)		Podium (Women)	
XCE; 7 June 2026	Turkey; Sakarya Province	1	Jakob Klemenčič (SLO)	1	Adéla Pernická (CZE)
XCE; 7 June 2026	Turkey; Sakarya Province	2	Theo Hauser (AUT)	2	Marion Fromberger (GER)
XCE; 7 June 2026	Turkey; Sakarya Province	3	Ede-Károly Molnár (ROU)	3	Margaux Borrelly (FRA)

Date	Venue	Podium (Men)		Podium (Women)	
XCM; 11–12 July 2026	Spain; Ramales de la Victoria	1	David Valero (ESP)	1	Anna Weinbeer (SUI)
XCM; 11–12 July 2026	Spain; Ramales de la Victoria	2	Gioele De Cosmo (ITA)	2	Natalia Fischer (ESP)
XCM; 11–12 July 2026	Spain; Ramales de la Victoria	3	Krzysztof Łukasik (POL)	3	Paula Gorycka (POL)

Date	Venue	Podium (Men)		Podium (Women)	
DHI; 14–16 August 2026	Bulgaria; Vitosha	1	Loris Revelli (ITA)	1	Gloria Scarsi (ITA)
DHI; 14–16 August 2026	Bulgaria; Vitosha	2	Stefano Introzzi (ITA)	2	Veronika Widmann (ITA)
DHI; 14–16 August 2026	Bulgaria; Vitosha	3	Dom Platt (GBR)	3	Amelia Dudek (POL)

Date	Venue	Podium	
XCR; 29 July – 2 August 2026	Switzerland; Monteceneri	1	Switzerland (SUI); Nicolas Halter; Men Gygax; Ronja Blöchlinger; Anina Hutter; Anja Grossmann; Vital Albin
XCR; 29 July – 2 August 2026	Switzerland; Monteceneri	2	Italy (ITA); Filippo Fontana; Jacopo Putaggio; Valentina Corvi; Giada Specia; Mariachiara Signorelli; Fabio Bassignana
XCR; 29 July – 2 August 2026	Switzerland; Monteceneri	3	Denmark (DEN); Johannes Brædstrup-Holm; Caroline Bohé; Albert Lundgren; Rose-Mai Damsgaard; Caroline Hede; Mikkel Lose

=== Oceania ===
Date	Venue	Podium (Men)		Podium (Women)	
XCO; 7–8 March 2026	Australia; Brisbane	1	Anton Cooper (NZL)	1	Rebecca Henderson (AUS)
XCO; 7–8 March 2026	Australia; Brisbane	2	Brent Rees (AUS)	2	Amélie MacKay (NZL)
XCO; 7–8 March 2026	Australia; Brisbane	3	Aiden Lefmann (AUS)	3	Samara Sheppard (NZL)

Date	Venue	Podium (Men)		Podium (Women)	
DHI; 11–12 April 2026	Australia; Toowoomba	1	Luke Meier-Smith (AUS)	1	Kate Hastings (NZL)
DHI; 11–12 April 2026	Australia; Toowoomba	2	Zachariah Bradley-Hudson (AUS)	2	Sacha Mills (AUS)
DHI; 11–12 April 2026	Australia; Toowoomba	3	Carter Sloan (AUS)	3	Jess Hoskin (AUS)

Date	Venue	Podium (Men)		Podium (Women)	
END; 21–22 October 2026	Australia; Collie	1	Archie Rigby Winter (AUS)	1	Connor Mielke (AUS)
END; 21–22 October 2026	Australia; Collie	2	Gus Kyme (AUS)	2	Willow Long (AUS)
END; 21–22 October 2026	Australia; Collie	3	Andrew Hacquoil (AUS)	3	Amelia Freeman (AUS)

Date	Venue	Podium (Men)		Podium (Women)	
E–END; 21–22 October 2026	Australia; Collie	1	Austin Ridley (AUS)	1	Carol Willcocks (AUS)
E–END; 21–22 October 2026	Australia; Collie	2	Mike Kennedy (AUS)	2	
E–END; 21–22 October 2026	Australia; Collie	3	Adam Collis (AUS)	3	

=== Africa ===
Date	Venue	Podium (Men)		Podium (Women)	
XCO; 29–31 May 2026	Ivory Coast; Abidjan	1	(South Africa) Luke Moir	1	(Zimbabwe) Stacey Hyslop
XCO; 29–31 May 2026	Ivory Coast; Abidjan	2	(South Africa) Michael Foster	2	(Mauritius) Aurelie Halbwachs
XCO; 29–31 May 2026	Ivory Coast; Abidjan	3	(South Africa) Luca Ruwiel	3	(Nigeria) Mary Samuel

Date	Venue	Podium (Men)		Podium (Women)	
XCC; 29–31 May 2026	Ivory Coast; Abidjan	1	(South Africa) Luke Moir	1	(Mauritius) Aurelie Halbwachs
XCC; 29–31 May 2026	Ivory Coast; Abidjan	2	(South Africa) Michael Foster	2	(Zimbabwe) Stacey Hyslop
XCC; 29–31 May 2026	Ivory Coast; Abidjan	3	(South Africa) Johann van Zyl	3	(Zambia) Luwi Chikomba

== Regional Games (JR) ==
=== 2026 Central American and Caribbean Games ===
Date	Venue	Podium (Men)		Podium (Women)	
XCO; 1 August 2026	Dominican Republic; Santiago de los Caballeros	1	(Mexico) Gerardo Ulloa	1	(Mexico) Carolina Flores
XCO; 1 August 2026	Dominican Republic; Santiago de los Caballeros	2	(Mexico) Adair Prieto	2	(Puerto Rico) Suheily Rodríguez
XCO; 1 August 2026	Dominican Republic; Santiago de los Caballeros	3	(Puerto Rico) Georwill Pérez	3	(Colombia) Ana María Roa

=== 2026 South American Games ===
Date	Venue	Podium (Men)		Podium (Women)	
XCO; 12–14 September 2026	Argentina; Rafaela	1	Joel Contreras (ARG)	1	Catalina Vidaurre (CHI)
XCO; 12–14 September 2026	Argentina; Rafaela	2	Alex Malacarne (BRA)	2	Florencia Monsálvez (CHI)
XCO; 12–14 September 2026	Argentina; Rafaela	3	Ulan Bastos Galinski (BRA)	3	Karen Olímpio (BRA)

=== 2026 Asian Games ===
Date	Venue	Podium (Men)		Podium (Women)	
XCO; 14–25 September 2026	Japan; Nagoya	1	Yuan Jinwei (CHN)	1	Wu Zhifan (CHN)
XCO; 14–25 September 2026	Japan; Nagoya	2	Tatsuumi Soejima (JPN)	2	Liang Zhenglan (CHN)
XCO; 14–25 September 2026	Japan; Nagoya	3	Feri Yudoyono (INA)	3	Sayu Bella Sukma Dewi (INA)

== National Chmpionships (NC) ==
Also, between July 17–19, the Liechtenstein National Championships took place, but only in the U23 age category.

=== XCO ===
Date	Venue	Podium (Men)		Podium (Women)	
XCO; 10–14 February 2026	India; Roing	1	Khushiman Gharti	1	Star Narzary
XCO; 10–14 February 2026	India; Roing	2	Tsewang Norboo	2	Pranita Soman
XCO; 10–14 February 2026	India; Roing	3	Shiven Shiven	3	Johsna Joy
XCO; 20–22 February 2026	Philippines; Danao	1	Adrian Nacano	1	Shagne Paula Yaoyao
XCO; 20–22 February 2026	Philippines; Danao	2	James Carl Dela Cruz	2	Adel Pia Sendrijas
XCO; 20–22 February 2026	Philippines; Danao	3	Mark Louwel Valderama	3	Dianna Costes
XCO; 13–15 March 2026	Chile; Santiago	1	Martín Vidaurre	1	Catalina Vidaurre
XCO; 13–15 March 2026	Chile; Santiago	2	Sebastián Miranda Maldonado	2	Yarela González
XCO; 13–15 March 2026	Chile; Santiago	3	Nicolás Delich	3	María Castro
XCO; 18–22 March 2026	Australia; Mount Buller	1	Jack Ward	1	Rebecca Henderson
XCO; 18–22 March 2026	Australia; Mount Buller	2	Harry Doye	2	Sarah Tucknott
XCO; 18–22 March 2026	Australia; Mount Buller	3	Tasman Nankervis	3	Katriina Dower
XCO; 28 March 2026	Rwanda; Musanze District	1	Banzi Buhari	1	Charlotte Iragena
XCO; 28 March 2026	Rwanda; Musanze District	2	Kevin Nshutiraguma	2	Violette Irakoze Neza
XCO; 28 March 2026	Rwanda; Musanze District	3	Janvier Muhoza	3	Claudine Ahishakiye
XCO; 29 March 2026	Bermuda; St. George's	1	Robin Horsfield	1	Charlotte Millington
XCO; 29 March 2026	Bermuda; St. George's	2	Che'Quan Richardson	2	Panzy Olander
XCO; 29 March 2026	Bermuda; St. George's	3	Forrest Chris Nusum	3	
XCO; 5 April 2026	Argentina; Mendoza	1	Agustín Durán	1	Inés Gutiérrez
XCO; 5 April 2026	Argentina; Mendoza	2	Fernando Contreras	2	María Laura Bugarín
XCO; 5 April 2026	Argentina; Mendoza	3	Catriel Soto	3	Antonella Quirós
XCO; 5 April 2026	Bolivia; Potosí	1	Miguel Armando Jerez	1	Vania Valkhyria Cisneros
XCO; 5 April 2026	Bolivia; Potosí	2	Cesar Hinojosa	2	Camila Estefani Vargas Grimaldos
XCO; 5 April 2026	Bolivia; Potosí	3	Samuel Canaviri	3	Mirian Muñoz
XCO; 26 April 2026	Thailand; Chanthaburi	1	Phunsiri Sirimongkhon	1	Pinphak Chiangsuan
XCO; 26 April 2026	Thailand; Chanthaburi	2	Panupong Srisang	2	Pornpak Praphothang
XCO; 26 April 2026	Thailand; Chanthaburi	3	Watcharakorn Onthuree	3	
XCO; 16–17 May 2026	Mauritius; Le Morne	1	William Piat	1	Aurelie Halbwachs
XCO; 16–17 May 2026	Mauritius; Le Morne	2	Yannick Lincoln	2	
XCO; 16–17 May 2026	Mauritius; Le Morne	3	Thierry David	3	
XCO; 30 May 2026	Norway; Sande, Vestfold	1	Sondre Rokke	1	Lisa Kristine Jorde
XCO; 30 May 2026	Norway; Sande, Vestfold	2	Knut Røhme	2	Oda Laforce
XCO; 30 May 2026	Norway; Sande, Vestfold	3	Mats Tubaas Glende	3	Eline Ekroll
XCO; 5 June 2026	Israel; Misgav Forest	1	Tomer Zaltsman	1	Naama Noyman
XCO; 5 June 2026	Israel; Misgav Forest	2	Yoav Lifshitz	2	Munira Yasin
XCO; 5 June 2026	Israel; Misgav Forest	3	Tomer Caspi	3	Zohar Bar Joseph
XCO; 5–6 June 2026	Nepal; Kathmandu	1		1	
XCO; 5–6 June 2026	Nepal; Kathmandu	2		2	
XCO; 5–6 June 2026	Nepal; Kathmandu	3		3	
XCO; 6 June 2026	Andorra; La Molina (Spain)	1	Xavier Jové	1	No one signed up.
XCO; 6 June 2026	Andorra; La Molina (Spain)	2	Only one elite	2	No one signed up.
XCO; 6 June 2026	Andorra; La Molina (Spain)	3	Only one elite	3	No one signed up.
XCO; 15–17 June 2026	Uzbekistan; Tashkent	1	Kamronbek Yuldoshev	1	Makpal Bulebaeva
XCO; 15–17 June 2026	Uzbekistan; Tashkent	2	Sardor Mukhtorov	2	Viktoriya Polzunova
XCO; 15–17 June 2026	Uzbekistan; Tashkent	3	Sanjarbek Ergashev	3	Valeriya Gamm
XCO; 28 June 2026	Denmark; Frederiksværk	1	Gustav Heby Pedersen	1	Sofie Heby Pedersen
XCO; 28 June 2026	Denmark; Frederiksværk	2	Sebastian Fini Carstensen	2	Caroline Bohé
XCO; 28 June 2026	Denmark; Frederiksværk	3	Tobias Lillelund	3	Julie Lillelund
XCO; 14–19 July 2026	Colombia; Pereira	1	Jhonnatan Botero	1	Ana María Roa
XCO; 14–19 July 2026	Colombia; Pereira	2	Jhonnatan Cantor	2	Camila Cagua
XCO; 14–19 July 2026	Colombia; Pereira	3	Iván Felipe López Castañeda	3	Gloria Garzón
XCO; 16–19 July 2026	Indonesia; Bogor	1	Zaenal Fanani	1	Sayu Bella Sukma Dewi
XCO; 16–19 July 2026	Indonesia; Bogor	2	Ihza Muhammad	2	Dela Anjar Wulan
XCO; 16–19 July 2026	Indonesia; Bogor	3	Mohammad Maydanil Arham	3	Supi Siti Khalipah
XCO; 16–19 July 2026	Malaysia; Putrajaya	1	Muhammad Syawal Mazlin	1	Phi Kun Pan
XCO; 16–19 July 2026	Malaysia; Putrajaya	2	Saniy Syahmi Mohd Safiee	2	Nur Deena Safia Nor Effandy
XCO; 16–19 July 2026	Malaysia; Putrajaya	3	Zulfikri Zulkifli	3	Rina Zaki
XCO; 17 July 2026	Kazakhstan; Kostanay	1		1	
XCO; 17 July 2026	Kazakhstan; Kostanay	2		2	
XCO; 17 July 2026	Kazakhstan; Kostanay	3		3	
XCO; 18 July 2026	Austria; Dornbirn	1	Max Foidl	1	Laura Stigger
XCO; 18 July 2026	Austria; Dornbirn	2	Mario Bair	2	Katrin Embacher
XCO; 18 July 2026	Austria; Dornbirn	3	Alexander Hammerle	3	Antonia Grangl
XCO; 18 July 2026	United States; Roanoke	1	Christopher Blevins	1	Savilia Blunk
XCO; 18 July 2026	United States; Roanoke	2	Bjorn Riley	2	Gwendalyn Gibson
XCO; 18 July 2026	United States; Roanoke	3	Riley Amos	3	Crystal Anthony
XCO; 18 July 2026	South Korea; Chilgok County	1		1	
XCO; 18 July 2026	South Korea; Chilgok County	2		2	
XCO; 18 July 2026	South Korea; Chilgok County	3		3	
XCO; 18 July 2026	Canada; Langford	1	Carter Woods	1	Emilly Johnston
XCO; 18 July 2026	Canada; Langford	2	Cole Punchard	2	Ella MacPhee
XCO; 18 July 2026	Canada; Langford	3	Owen Clark	3	Anne Marie Gauthier
XCO; 18 July 2026	Turkey; Nevşehir	1	Ahmet Can Akpınar	1	Azize Bekar
XCO; 18 July 2026	Turkey; Nevşehir	2	Furkan Akçam	2	Asuman Burcu Balci
XCO; 18 July 2026	Turkey; Nevşehir	3	Emre Yavuz	3	Melike Yiğit
XCO; 19 July 2026	Sweden; Borlänge	1	Edvin Elofsson	1	Elin Ålsjö
XCO; 19 July 2026	Sweden; Borlänge	2	Leo Lounela	2	Emma Belforth
XCO; 19 July 2026	Sweden; Borlänge	3	Viktor Lindqvist	3	Elin Karlsson
XCO; 19 July 2026	Belarus; Grodno	1	Maksim Malyshko	1	Anna Kalashnikova
XCO; 19 July 2026	Belarus; Grodno	2	Dainis Bricis	2	Anastasia Kuznetsova
XCO; 19 July 2026	Belarus; Grodno	3	Alexandr Sychugov	3	Tatyana Sovpel
XCO; 19 July 2026	Belgium; Tessenderlo-Ham	1	Pierre de Froidmont	1	Emeline Detilleux
XCO; 19 July 2026	Belgium; Tessenderlo-Ham	2	Jens Schuermans	2	Alicia Franck
XCO; 19 July 2026	Belgium; Tessenderlo-Ham	3	Clément Horny	3	Britt Segers
XCO; 19 July 2026	France; Dévoluy	1	Mathis Azzaro	1	Loana Lecomte
XCO; 19 July 2026	France; Dévoluy	2	Luca Martin Mathis Guay	2	Olivia Onesti
XCO; 19 July 2026	France; Dévoluy	3	Mathis Guay	3	Léna Gérault
XCO; 19 July 2026	Poland; Polanica-Zdrój	1	Krzysztof Łukasik	1	Gabriela Wojtyła
XCO; 19 July 2026	Poland; Polanica-Zdrój	2	Filip Helta	2	Paula Gorycka
XCO; 19 July 2026	Poland; Polanica-Zdrój	3	Karol Ostaszewski	3	Joanna Głowacka
XCO; 19 July 2026	Ukraine; Chernivtsi	1	Oleksandr Hudyma	1	Yana Belomoyna
XCO; 19 July 2026	Ukraine; Chernivtsi	2	Anton Rybka	2	Mariia Sukhopalova
XCO; 19 July 2026	Ukraine; Chernivtsi	3	Dmytro Titarenko	3	Maria Sherstiuk
XCO; 19 July 2026	Ecuador; Quito	1	Benjamín Quinteros	1	Miryam Núñez
XCO; 19 July 2026	Ecuador; Quito	2	Juan Carlos Córdova	2	Joanna Cordova Terneus
XCO; 19 July 2026	Ecuador; Quito	3	William Tobay	3	Mikela Molina (DNS)
XCO; 19 July 2026	Switzerland; Leysin	1	Dario Lillo	1	Nicole Koller
XCO; 19 July 2026	Switzerland; Leysin	2	Fabio Püntener	2	Alessandra Keller
XCO; 19 July 2026	Switzerland; Leysin	3	Marcel Guerrini	3	Rebekka Estermann
XCO; 19 July 2026	Germany; Wembach	1	Luca Schwarzbauer	1	Nina Graf
XCO; 19 July 2026	Germany; Wembach	2	Maximilian Brandl	2	Kira Böhm
XCO; 19 July 2026	Germany; Wembach	3	Paul Schehl	3	Sina Van Thiel
XCO; 19 July 2026	Spain; Arroyomolinos	1	David Valero	1	Marta Cano
XCO; 19 July 2026	Spain; Arroyomolinos	2	Thibaut François Baudry	2	Estíbaliz Sagardoy
XCO; 19 July 2026	Spain; Arroyomolinos	3	David Campos	3	Natalia Fischer
XCO; 19 July 2026	Greece; Karyes	1	Alexandros Athanasiadis	1	Eleftheria Giachou
XCO; 19 July 2026	Greece; Karyes	2	Charoun Molla	2	Varvara Fasoi
XCO; 19 July 2026	Greece; Karyes	3	Iraklis Balafas	3	Eirini Maria Karousou
XCO; 19 July 2026	United Kingdom; Forest of Ae	1	Charlie Aldridge	1	Grace Inglis
XCO; 19 July 2026	United Kingdom; Forest of Ae	2	Cameron Orr	2	Isla Short
XCO; 19 July 2026	United Kingdom; Forest of Ae	3	Thomas Mein	3	Nicky Healy
XCO; 19 July 2026	Estonia; Narva	1	Markus Pajur	1	Janika Lõiv
XCO; 19 July 2026	Estonia; Narva	2	Kirill Tarassov	2	Loore Lemloch
XCO; 19 July 2026	Estonia; Narva	3		3	Mairit Kaarjärv
XCO; 19 July 2026	Albania; Tirana	1		1	
XCO; 19 July 2026	Albania; Tirana	2		2	
XCO; 19 July 2026	Albania; Tirana	3		3	
XCO; 2026	Uruguay; Rocha	1		1	
XCO; 2026	Uruguay; Rocha	2		2	
XCO; 2026	Uruguay; Rocha	3		3	
XCO; 19 July 2026	Bulgaria; Sofia	1	Victor Enev	1	Yoana Valkanova
XCO; 19 July 2026	Bulgaria; Sofia	2	Deyan Atanasov	2	Elena Dobranitsa
XCO; 19 July 2026	Bulgaria; Sofia	3	Mihail Kostadinov	3	Maria Marinova
XCO; 19 July 2026	Japan; Nagano	1	Tatsuumi Soejima	1	Yui Ishida
XCO; 19 July 2026	Japan; Nagano	2	Riki Kitabayashi	2	Urara Kawaguchi
XCO; 19 July 2026	Japan; Nagano	3	Ryo Takeuchi	3	Reno Hamashita
XCO; 19 July 2026	Cyprus; Troodos Mountains	1		1	
XCO; 19 July 2026	Cyprus; Troodos Mountains	2		2	
XCO; 19 July 2026	Cyprus; Troodos Mountains	3		3	
XCO; 19 July 2026	China; Nanjing	1		1	Wu Zhifan
XCO; 19 July 2026	China; Nanjing	2		2	Liang Zhenglan
XCO; 19 July 2026	China; Nanjing	3		3	Wei Qianqian
XCO; 19 July 2026	Costa Rica; Cartago	1	Keyron Solís	1	Cristel Espinoza
XCO; 19 July 2026	Costa Rica; Cartago	2	Carlos Herrera	2	Adriana Rojas
XCO; 19 July 2026	Costa Rica; Cartago	3	Paolo Montoya	3	Isabel García
XCO; 19 July 2026	Ireland; Leinster	1	Christopher Dawson	1	Greta Lawless
XCO; 19 July 2026	Ireland; Leinster	2	Daniel Brickenden	2	Caoimhe May
XCO; 19 July 2026	Ireland; Leinster	3	David Montgomery	3	Ciara MacManus
XCO; 19 July 2026	Latvia; Ikšķile	1	Oskars Muižnieks	1	Evelīna Ermane-Marčenko
XCO; 19 July 2026	Latvia; Ikšķile	2	Kristers Celitāns	2	Renāte Rodionova
XCO; 19 July 2026	Latvia; Ikšķile	3	Kārlis Baltacis	3	Evija Ziediņa
XCO; 19 July 2026	Lithuania; Šiauliai	1	Ignas Ambrazas	1	Elvyra Biekšienė
XCO; 19 July 2026	Lithuania; Šiauliai	2	Justinas Biekša	2	
XCO; 19 July 2026	Lithuania; Šiauliai	3		3	
XCO; 19 July 2026	Namibia; Windhoek	1	Hugo Hahn	1	Monique du Plessis
XCO; 19 July 2026	Namibia; Windhoek	2	Xavier Papo	2	Vera Looser
XCO; 19 July 2026	Namibia; Windhoek	3		3	
XCO; 19 July 2026	Paraguay; Villarrica	1		1	
XCO; 19 July 2026	Paraguay; Villarrica	2		2	
XCO; 19 July 2026	Paraguay; Villarrica	3		3	
XCO; 19 July 2026	Puerto Rico; Salinas	1	Georwill Pérez Román	1	Suheily Rodríguez
XCO; 19 July 2026	Puerto Rico; Salinas	2	Jacob Morales	2	Coral Ramírez
XCO; 19 July 2026	Puerto Rico; Salinas	3	Ángel Rodríguez	3	
XCO; 19 July 2026	South Africa; Bloemfontein	1	Alan Hatherly	1	Candice Lill
XCO; 19 July 2026	South Africa; Bloemfontein	2	Luke Moir	2	Tyler Jacobs
XCO; 19 July 2026	South Africa; Bloemfontein	3	Johann van Zyl	3	Danielle du Toit
XCO; 19 July 2026	Czech Republic; Stupno	1	Ondřej Cink	1	Tereza Tvarůžková
XCO; 19 July 2026	Czech Republic; Stupno	2	Jan Sáska	2	Adéla Holubová
XCO; 19 July 2026	Czech Republic; Stupno	3	František Hojka	3	Simona Spěšná
XCO; 19 July 2026	Slovakia; Selce	1	Matej Ulík	1	Janka Keseg Števková
XCO; 19 July 2026	Slovakia; Selce	2	Peter Šoltés	2	Tereza Kurnická
XCO; 19 July 2026	Slovakia; Selce	3	Samuel Kováč	3	Dorota Vojtíšková
XCO; 19 July 2026	Croatia; Žminj	1	Fran Bošnjak	1	Ana Rumiha
XCO; 19 July 2026	Croatia; Žminj	2	Roko Fržop	2	Larisa Bošnjak
XCO; 19 July 2026	Croatia; Žminj	3	Robert Rosan	3	Dora Čičin-Šain
XCO; 19 July 2026	Honduras; Siguatepeque	1	Luis López	1	Linda Menéndez
XCO; 19 July 2026	Honduras; Siguatepeque	2	Pablo Cruz	2	Karen Canales
XCO; 19 July 2026	Honduras; Siguatepeque	3	Josué Reyes	3	Ninoska Andino
XCO; 19 July 2026	Peru; Huacho	1		1	
XCO; 19 July 2026	Peru; Huacho	2		2	
XCO; 19 July 2026	Peru; Huacho	3		3	
XCO; 19 July 2026	Portugal; Fundão	1	Ricardo Marinheiro	1	Ana Santos
XCO; 19 July 2026	Portugal; Fundão	2	João Cruz	2	Raquel Queirós
XCO; 19 July 2026	Portugal; Fundão	3	Gonçalo Amado	3	Joana Monteiro
XCO; 19 July 2026	Italy; Nervesa della Battaglia	1	Simone Avondetto	1	Martina Berta
XCO; 19 July 2026	Italy; Nervesa della Battaglia	2	Juri Zanotti	2	Giada Specia
XCO; 19 July 2026	Italy; Nervesa della Battaglia	3	Matteo Siffredi	3	Sara Cortinovis
XCO; 19 July 2026	Chinese Taipei; Yunlin County	1	Gong Yu–Zhe	1	Ya Yu Tsai
XCO; 19 July 2026	Chinese Taipei; Yunlin County	2	Chiang Sheng-shan	2	Shu Wei Hsu
XCO; 19 July 2026	Chinese Taipei; Yunlin County	3	Chang Yu–Lun	3	Shih Hsuan Cheng
XCO; 19 July 2026	Slovenia; Kočevje	1	Blaž Kavčič	1	Vita Movrin
XCO; 19 July 2026	Slovenia; Kočevje	2	Mihael Štajnar	2	Maruša Tereza Šerkezi
XCO; 19 July 2026	Slovenia; Kočevje	3	Rok Naglič	3	Tina Vrhovnik
XCO; 19 July 2026	Hungary; Alsóörs	1	Vince Dániel Kiss	1	Regina Bruchner
XCO; 19 July 2026	Hungary; Alsóörs	2	Barnabás Vas	2	
XCO; 19 July 2026	Hungary; Alsóörs	3	Máté Endrédi	3	
XCO; 19 July 2026	Netherlands; Honselersdijk	1	Rens Teunissen van Manen	1	Mae Cabaca
XCO; 19 July 2026	Netherlands; Honselersdijk	2	Freek Bouten	2	Bloeme Kalis
XCO; 19 July 2026	Netherlands; Honselersdijk	3	Chris van Dijk	3	Femke Mossinkoff
XCO; 19 July 2026	Finland; Seinäjoki	1		1	
XCO; 19 July 2026	Finland; Seinäjoki	2		2	
XCO; 19 July 2026	Finland; Seinäjoki	3		3	
XCO; 19 July 2026	Lesotho; Maseru	1		1	
XCO; 19 July 2026	Lesotho; Maseru	2		2	
XCO; 19 July 2026	Lesotho; Maseru	3		3	
XCO; 19 July 2026	Luxembourg; Esch-sur-Alzette	1	Tijay Heinen	1	Fabienne Schaus
XCO; 19 July 2026	Luxembourg; Esch-sur-Alzette	2	Lucas Van Den Abeele	2	
XCO; 19 July 2026	Luxembourg; Esch-sur-Alzette	3	Raphaël Kockelmann	3	
XCO; 19 July 2026	Montenegro; Kolašin	1		1	
XCO; 19 July 2026	Montenegro; Kolašin	2		2	
XCO; 19 July 2026	Montenegro; Kolašin	3		3	
XCO; 19 July 2026	Romania; Moieciu	1	Vlad Dascălu	1	Miruna Măda
XCO; 19 July 2026	Romania; Moieciu	2	Patrick Pescaru	2	Giulia Pârvu
XCO; 19 July 2026	Romania; Moieciu	3	Victor-Alexandru Aron	3	Eszter Bereczki
XCO; 19 July 2026	El Salvador; Santa Ana	1	Charli Quiñonez	1	Xenia Estrada
XCO; 19 July 2026	El Salvador; Santa Ana	2	Roberto Monroy	2	Ariel María Magaña
XCO; 19 July 2026	El Salvador; Santa Ana	3	Jovel Retana	3	
XCO; 19 July 2026	Lebanon; Kfardebian	1		1	
XCO; 19 July 2026	Lebanon; Kfardebian	2		2	
XCO; 19 July 2026	Lebanon; Kfardebian	3		3	
XCO; 19 July 2026	Serbia; Raška	1	Igor Davidov	1	Bojana Jovanović
XCO; 19 July 2026	Serbia; Raška	2	Jovan Divnić	2	Selena Kuljača
XCO; 19 July 2026	Serbia; Raška	3	Stefan Davidov	3	Isidora Mladenović
XCO; 19 July 2026	North Macedonia; Kumanovo	1	Goran Kuzmanovski	1	Marija Savkovska
XCO; 19 July 2026	North Macedonia; Kumanovo	2	Aleksandar Miloshevski	2	
XCO; 19 July 2026	North Macedonia; Kumanovo	3	Aleksej Atanasovski	3	
XCO; 19 July 2026	Kyrgyzstan; Orto-Say	1	Valerii Kopytin	1	
XCO; 19 July 2026	Kyrgyzstan; Orto-Say	2	Aleksei Mikhailov	2	
XCO; 19 July 2026	Kyrgyzstan; Orto-Say	3	Rustem Iliasov	3	
XCO; 26 July 2026	Brazil; São José dos Campos	1	Alex Malacarne	1	Raiza Goulão
XCO; 26 July 2026	Brazil; São José dos Campos	2	Ulan Bastos Galinski	2	Giuliana Salvini Morgen
XCO; 26 July 2026	Brazil; São José dos Campos	3	Luiz Miguel Honório	3	Hercilia Najara
XCO; 26 July 2026	Zambia; Solwezi	1		1	
XCO; 26 July 2026	Zambia; Solwezi	2		2	
XCO; 26 July 2026	Zambia; Solwezi	3		3	
XCO; 26 July 2026	Singapore; Singapore	1	Riyadh Hakim	1	Tsalina Phang Yi-lin
XCO; 26 July 2026	Singapore; Singapore	2	Arfan Bin Faisal	2	
XCO; 26 July 2026	Singapore; Singapore	3	Sathya Simman Chockalingam	3	
XCO; 26 July 2026	Mexico; Tapalpa	1	Gerardo Ulloa	1	Cynthia Martin
XCO; 26 July 2026	Mexico; Tapalpa	2	Iván Aguilar	2	María Carolina Flores
XCO; 26 July 2026	Mexico; Tapalpa	3	Adair Prieto	3	Fátima Hijar
XCO; 27 September 2026	Venezuela; Puerto La Cruz	1	Isaías Nil Morales Rojas	1	Yngrid Porras
XCO; 27 September 2026	Venezuela; Puerto La Cruz	2	Antonio José Marrero Morales	2	Lisbet Goncalves
XCO; 27 September 2026	Venezuela; Puerto La Cruz	3	Neluis Gómez	3	Yenny Carolina Briceño
XCO; 10 October 2026	Moldova; Chișinău	1	Alexandr Bonta	1	Anastasia Lisnic
XCO; 10 October 2026	Moldova; Chișinău	2	Andrii Korin	2	Anastasia Gărbălău
XCO; 10 October 2026	Moldova; Chișinău	3	Cristian Stratan	3	
XCO; 24 October 2026	Zimbabwe; Darwendale	1	Albert Kirevha	1	Stacey Hyslop
XCO; 24 October 2026	Zimbabwe; Darwendale	2	Tathlani Chitepo	2	Helen Mitchell
XCO; 24 October 2026	Zimbabwe; Darwendale	3	Brian Chinembiri	3	
XCO; 2026 (New date)	Uruguay ?	1		1	
XCO; 2026 (New date)	Uruguay ?	2		2	
XCO; 2026 (New date)	Uruguay ?	3		3	

=== XCC ===
Date	Venue	Podium (Men)		Podium (Women)	
XCC; 13–15 March 2026	Chile; Santiago	1	Martín Vidaurre	1	Florencia Monsálvez
XCC; 13–15 March 2026	Chile; Santiago	2	Sebastián Miranda Maldonado	2	Catalina Vidaurre
XCC; 13–15 March 2026	Chile; Santiago	3	Ignacio Gallo	3	Yarela González
XCC; 18–22 March 2026	Australia; Mount Buller	1	Jack Ward	1	Rebecca Henderson
XCC; 18–22 March 2026	Australia; Mount Buller	2	Harry Doye	2	Sarah Tucknott
XCC; 18–22 March 2026	Australia; Mount Buller	3	Tasman Nankervis	3	Ruby Taylor
XCC; 4 April 2026	Argentina; Mendoza	1	Fernando Contreras	1	Inés Gutiérrez
XCC; 4 April 2026	Argentina; Mendoza	2	Agustín Durán	2	Antonella Quirós
XCC; 4 April 2026	Argentina; Mendoza	3	Catriel Soto	3	Carla Trinchitella
XCC; 16–17 May 2026	Mauritius; Le Morne	1	William Piat	1	Aurelie Halbwachs
XCC; 16–17 May 2026	Mauritius; Le Morne	2	Lucas Froget	2	Valérie Gérard
XCC; 16–17 May 2026	Mauritius; Le Morne	3	Jean Julien Cornette	3	
XCC; 29–30 May 2026	Italy; Courmayeur	1	Juri Zanotti	1	Martina Berta
XCC; 29–30 May 2026	Italy; Courmayeur	2	Gioele Bertolini	2	Greta Seiwald
XCC; 29–30 May 2026	Italy; Courmayeur	3	Simone Avondetto	3	Chiara Teocchi
XCC; 31 May 2026	Czech Republic; Prague	1	Jan Zatloukal	1	Simona Spěšná
XCC; 31 May 2026	Czech Republic; Prague	2	Patrik Černý	2	Tereza Tvarůžková
XCC; 31 May 2026	Czech Republic; Prague	3	Jan Sáska	3	Amálie Gottwaldová
XCC; 31 May 2026	Norway; Sande, Vestfold	1	Sondre Rokke	1	Lisa Kristine Jorde
XCC; 31 May 2026	Norway; Sande, Vestfold	2	Knut Røhme	2	Oda Laforce
XCC; 31 May 2026	Norway; Sande, Vestfold	3	Sigurd Stubberud	3	Eline Ekroll
XCC; 5 June 2026	Spain; La Molina	1	Jofre Cullell	1	Marta Cano
XCC; 5 June 2026	Spain; La Molina	2	Thibaut François Baudry	2	Estíbaliz Sagardoy
XCC; 5 June 2026	Spain; La Molina	3	Hugo Franco Gallego	3	Lucía Gómez
XCC; 15–17 June 2026	Uzbekistan; Tashkent	1	Samariddin Sayfiev	1	Makpal Bulebaeva
XCC; 15–17 June 2026	Uzbekistan; Tashkent	2	Shoxrux Kodirov	2	Raksana Khikmatova
XCC; 15–17 June 2026	Uzbekistan; Tashkent	3	Ruslanbek Zarifboyev	3	Valeriya Gamm
XCC; 26 June 2026	Austria; Koppl	1	Julius Scherrer	1	Tamara Wiedmann
XCC; 26 June 2026	Austria; Koppl	2	Lukas Hatz	2	Nadja Heigl
XCC; 26 June 2026	Austria; Koppl	3	Mario Bair	3	Sophia Knaubert
XCC; 27 June 2026	Denmark; Frederiksværk	1	Sebastian Fini Carstensen	1	Sofie Heby Pedersen
XCC; 27 June 2026	Denmark; Frederiksværk	2	Tobias Lillelund	2	Caroline Bohé
XCC; 27 June 2026	Denmark; Frederiksværk	3	Gustav Heby Pedersen	3	Julie Lillelund
XCC; 14–19 July 2026	Colombia; Pereira	1	Jhonnatan Cantor	1	Ana María Roa
XCC; 14–19 July 2026	Colombia; Pereira	2	Jerónimo Bedoya	2	Camila Cagua
XCC; 14–19 July 2026	Colombia; Pereira	3	Jhonnatan Botero	3	Paula Nicole Ladino
XCC; 15 July 2026	Cyprus; Tochni	1	Georgios Kouzis	1	Ekaterina Kovalchuk
XCC; 15 July 2026	Cyprus; Tochni	2	Andreas Kasapis	2	Styliana Camilari
XCC; 15 July 2026	Cyprus; Tochni	3	Christos Erotokritou	3	Constantina Georgiou
XCC; 15 July 2026	Kazakhstan; Kostanay	1	Denis Sergienko	1	Tatyana Geneleva
XCC; 15 July 2026	Kazakhstan; Kostanay	2	Nikita Galkin	2	Yuliya Li
XCC; 15 July 2026	Kazakhstan; Kostanay	3	Alexey Fefelov	3	Alina Spirina
XCC; 15–19 July 2026	Canada; Langford	1	Carter Woods	1	Ella MacPhee
XCC; 15–19 July 2026	Canada; Langford	2	Gunnar Holmgren	2	Rafaëlle Carrier
XCC; 15–19 July 2026	Canada; Langford	3	Logan Sadesky	3	Emilly Johnston
XCC; 15–19 July 2026	France; Dévoluy	1	Luca Martin	1	Line Burquier
XCC; 15–19 July 2026	France; Dévoluy	2	Mathis Guay	2	Loana Lecomte
XCC; 15–19 July 2026	France; Dévoluy	3	Jordan Sarrou	3	Tatiana Tournut
XCC; 15–19 July 2026	Sweden; Borlänge	1	Edvin Elofsson	1	Elin Ålsjö
XCC; 15–19 July 2026	Sweden; Borlänge	2	André Eriksson	2	Thea Persson
XCC; 15–19 July 2026	Sweden; Borlänge	3	Leo Lounela	3	Emma Belforth
XCC; 15–19 July 2026	United States; Roanoke	1	Bjorn Riley	1	Savilia Blunk
XCC; 15–19 July 2026	United States; Roanoke	2	Christopher Blevins	2	Gwendalyn Gibson
XCC; 15–19 July 2026	United States; Roanoke	3	Ivan Sippy	3	Crystal Anthony
XCC; 16 July 2026	Israel; Kule Forest	1	Tomer Zaltsman	1	Naama Noyman
XCC; 16 July 2026	Israel; Kule Forest	2	Yoav Lifshitz	2	Munira Yasin
XCC; 16 July 2026	Israel; Kule Forest	3	Tomer Caspi	3	Zohar Bar Joseph
XCC; 16–19 July 2026	Belarus; Grodno	1	Dainis Bricis	1	Yana Danylyuk
XCC; 16–19 July 2026	Belarus; Grodno	2	Maksim Malyshko	2	Anna Kalashnikova
XCC; 16–19 July 2026	Belarus; Grodno	3	Egor Khevuk	3	Anastasia Kuznetsova
XCC; 16–19 July 2026	Indonesia; Bogor	1	Feri Yudoyono	1	Sayu Bella Sukma Dewi
XCC; 16–19 July 2026	Indonesia; Bogor	2	Zaenal Fanani	2	Elvia Tri Wulandari
XCC; 16–19 July 2026	Indonesia; Bogor	3	Ihza Muhammad	3	Dela Anjar Wulan
XCC; 17 July 2026	Belgium; Tessenderlo-Ham	1	Jarne Vandersteen	1	Emeline Detilleux
XCC; 17 July 2026	Belgium; Tessenderlo-Ham	2	Jens Schuermans	2	Alicia Franck
XCC; 17 July 2026	Belgium; Tessenderlo-Ham	3	Pierre de Froidmont	3	Britt Segers
XCC; 17 July 2026	Turkey; Nevşehir	1	Ahmet Akpınar	1	Azize Bekar
XCC; 17 July 2026	Turkey; Nevşehir	2	Furkan Akçam	2	Tuğçe Bitirim
XCC; 17 July 2026	Turkey; Nevşehir	3	Emre Yavuz	3	Emine Sezer
XCC; 18 July 2026	Romania; Moieciu	1	Vlad Dascălu	1	Miruna Măda
XCC; 18 July 2026	Romania; Moieciu	2	Patrick Pescaru	2	Giulia Pârvu
XCC; 18 July 2026	Romania; Moieciu	3	Máté Szakács	3	Eszter Bereczki
XCC; 18 July 2026	United Kingdom; Forest of Ae	1	Charlie Aldridge	1	Bethany-Ann Jackson
XCC; 18 July 2026	United Kingdom; Forest of Ae	2	Cameron Orr	2	Isla Short
XCC; 18 July 2026	United Kingdom; Forest of Ae	3	Max Standen	3	Daisy Taylor
XCC; 18 July 2026	Poland; Polanica-Zdrój	1	Filip Helta	1	Gabriela Wojtyła
XCC; 18 July 2026	Poland; Polanica-Zdrój	2	Krzysztof Łukasik	2	Paula Gorycka
XCC; 18 July 2026	Poland; Polanica-Zdrój	3	Karol Ostaszewski	3	Klaudia Czabok
XCC; 18 July 2026	Ukraine; Chernivtsi	1		1	
XCC; 18 July 2026	Ukraine; Chernivtsi	2		2	
XCC; 18 July 2026	Ukraine; Chernivtsi	3		3	
XCC; 18 July 2026	Ecuador; Quito	1	Juan Carlos Córdova	1	Miryam Núñez
XCC; 18 July 2026	Ecuador; Quito	2	Benjamín Quinteros	2	Mikela Molina
XCC; 18 July 2026	Ecuador; Quito	3	William Tobay	3	Daniela del Rocio Machuca
XCC; 18 July 2026	Switzerland; Leysin	1	Lars Forster	1	Alessandra Keller
XCC; 18 July 2026	Switzerland; Leysin	2	Dario Lillo	2	Nicole Koller
XCC; 18 July 2026	Switzerland; Leysin	3	Vital Albin	3	Rebekka Estermann
XCC; 18 July 2026	Germany; Wembach	1	Luca Schwarzbauer	1	Kira Böhm
XCC; 18 July 2026	Germany; Wembach	2	Maximilian Brandl	2	Lia Schrievers
XCC; 18 July 2026	Germany; Wembach	3	Julian Schelb	3	Sina Van Thiel
XCC; 18 July 2026	Greece; Karyes	1	Alexandros Athanasiadis	1	Eleftheria Giachou
XCC; 18 July 2026	Greece; Karyes	2	Charoun Molla	2	Varvara Fasoi
XCC; 18 July 2026	Greece; Karyes	3	Spyridon Geralis	3	Athina Tzoulaki
XCC; 18 July 2026	Estonia; Narva	1	Riko Tammepuu	1	Janika Lõiv
XCC; 18 July 2026	Estonia; Narva	2	Matthias Mõttus	2	Mairit Kaarjärv
XCC; 18 July 2026	Estonia; Narva	3	Kirill Tarassov	3	Loore Lemloch
XCC; 18 July 2026	Albania; Tirana	1		1	
XCC; 18 July 2026	Albania; Tirana	2		2	
XCC; 18 July 2026	Albania; Tirana	3		3	
XCC; 18 July 2026	Uruguay; Rocha	1	Maximiliano Generali	1	Silvina Silva
XCC; 18 July 2026	Uruguay; Rocha	2	Andrés Gelpes	2	Lucía Sicilia
XCC; 18 July 2026	Uruguay; Rocha	3	Santiago Calo	3	Anahí Paiva
XCC; 18 July 2026	Japan; Nagano	1	Toki Sawada	1	Akari Kobayashi
XCC; 18 July 2026	Japan; Nagano	2	Sho Takahashi	2	Yui Ishida
XCC; 18 July 2026	Japan; Nagano	3	Riki Kitabayashi	3	Urara Kawaguchi
XCC; 18 July 2026	Costa Rica; Cartago	1	Keyron Solís	1	Cristel Espinoza
XCC; 18 July 2026	Costa Rica; Cartago	2	Carlos Herrera	2	Adriana Rojas
XCC; 18 July 2026	Costa Rica; Cartago	3	Jared Méndez	3	Isabel García
XCC; 18 July 2026	Ireland; Leinster	1	Christopher Dawson	1	Greta Lawless
XCC; 18 July 2026	Ireland; Leinster	2	Gary Donaldson	2	Caoimhe May
XCC; 18 July 2026	Ireland; Leinster	3	David Montgomery	3	
XCC; 18 July 2026	Latvia; Ikšķile	1	Kristers Celitāns	1	Evelīna Ermane-Marčenko
XCC; 18 July 2026	Latvia; Ikšķile	2	Nauris Zviedris	2	Amanda Reilija Zariņa
XCC; 18 July 2026	Latvia; Ikšķile	3	Kārlis Baltacis	3	Evija Ziediņa
XCC; 18 July 2026	Lithuania; Šiauliai	1	Ignas Ambrazas	1	Tatjana Petrauskienė
XCC; 18 July 2026	Lithuania; Šiauliai	2	Domas Manikas	2	Elvyra Biekšienė
XCC; 18 July 2026	Lithuania; Šiauliai	3	Justinas Biekša	3	
XCC; 18 July 2026	Namibia; Windhoek	1	Roger Surén	1	Monique du Plessis
XCC; 18 July 2026	Namibia; Windhoek	2	Hugo Hahn	2	
XCC; 18 July 2026	Namibia; Windhoek	3		3	
XCC; 18 July 2026	Paraguay; Villarrica	1		1	
XCC; 18 July 2026	Paraguay; Villarrica	2		2	
XCC; 18 July 2026	Paraguay; Villarrica	3		3	
XCC; 18 July 2026	Puerto Rico; Salinas	1	Georwill Pérez Román	1	Suheily Rodríguez
XCC; 18 July 2026	Puerto Rico; Salinas	2	Jacob Morales	2	Coral Ramírez
XCC; 18 July 2026	Puerto Rico; Salinas	3	Ángel Rodríguez	3	
XCC; 19 July 2026	South Africa; Bloemfontein	1	Alan Hatherly	1	Errin Mackridge
XCC; 19 July 2026	South Africa; Bloemfontein	2	Luke Moir	2	Danielle du Toit
XCC; 19 July 2026	South Africa; Bloemfontein	3	Johann van Zyl	3	Larissa Meintjes
XCC; 18 July 2026	Slovakia; Selce	1	Matej Ulík	1	Tereza Kurnická
XCC; 18 July 2026	Slovakia; Selce	2	Samuel Kováč	2	Dorota Vojtíšková
XCC; 18 July 2026	Slovakia; Selce	3	Peter Šoltés	3	Janka Keseg Števková
XCC; 19 July 2026	Honduras; Siguatepeque	1	Luis López	1	Linda Menéndez
XCC; 19 July 2026	Honduras; Siguatepeque	2	Pablo Cruz	2	Ninoska Andino
XCC; 19 July 2026	Honduras; Siguatepeque	3	Marcos Mendoza	3	
XCC; 19 July 2026	Portugal; Fundão	1	Ricardo Marinheiro	1	Ana Santos
XCC; 19 July 2026	Portugal; Fundão	2	Roberto Ferreira	2	Beatriz Guerra
XCC; 19 July 2026	Portugal; Fundão	3	Gonçalo Amado	3	Raquel Queirós
XCC; 18 July 2026	Slovenia; Kočevje	1	Mihael Štajnar	1	Vita Movrin
XCC; 18 July 2026	Slovenia; Kočevje	2	Blaž Kavčič	2	Maruša Tereza Šerkezi
XCC; 18 July 2026	Slovenia; Kočevje	3	Gašper Štajnar	3	Tina Vrhovnik
XCC; 18 July 2026	Hungary; Alsóörs	1	Barnabás Vas	1	Regina Bruchner
XCC; 18 July 2026	Hungary; Alsóörs	2	Máté Endrédi	2	Adrienn Lengyel-Fibecz
XCC; 18 July 2026	Hungary; Alsóörs	3	Zsombor Palumby	3	
XCC; 18 July 2026	Netherlands; Honselersdijk	1	Rens Teunissen van Manen	1	Femke Mossinkoff
XCC; 18 July 2026	Netherlands; Honselersdijk	2	Freek Bouten	2	Anne Tauber
XCC; 18 July 2026	Netherlands; Honselersdijk	3	Morris Gruiters	3	Mae Cabaca
XCC; 18 July 2026	Finland; Seinäjoki	1	Joni Savaste	1	Henna-Mari Havana
XCC; 18 July 2026	Finland; Seinäjoki	2	Samuel Pökälä	2	Noora Kanerva
XCC; 18 July 2026	Finland; Seinäjoki	3	Aksel Rantanen	3	Ruska Saarela
XCC; 4 July 2026	Lesotho; Maseru	1	Tumelo Makae	1	Ponst'o Makatile
XCC; 4 July 2026	Lesotho; Maseru	2	Lisakhanya Mntoyedwa	2	Lebohang Selepe
XCC; 4 July 2026	Lesotho; Maseru	3	Phetetso Monese	3	Katleho Lits'eho
XCC; 18 July 2026	Serbia; Raška	1	Damjan Stanišić	1	Bojana Jovanović
XCC; 18 July 2026	Serbia; Raška	2	Jovan Divnić	2	Marija Bajeva
XCC; 18 July 2026	Serbia; Raška	3	Nemanja Todorović	3	Isidora Mladenović
XCC; 23–26 July 2026	Brazil; São José dos Campos	1	Alex Malacarne	1	Raiza Goulão
XCC; 23–26 July 2026	Brazil; São José dos Campos	2	Gustavo Xavier de Oliveira	2	Giuliana Salvini Morgen
XCC; 23–26 July 2026	Brazil; São José dos Campos	3	José Gabriel Marques de Almeida	3	Hercilia Najara
XCC; 25 July 2026	Zambia; Solwezi	1		1	
XCC; 25 July 2026	Zambia; Solwezi	2		2	
XCC; 25 July 2026	Zambia; Solwezi	3		3	
XCC; 25 July 2026	Mexico; Tapalpa	1	Gerardo Ulloa	1	María Carolina Flores
XCC; 25 July 2026	Mexico; Tapalpa	2	Iván Aguilar	2	Cynthia Martin
XCC; 25 July 2026	Mexico; Tapalpa	3	Adair Prieto	3	Joy Harumi Méndez García
XCC; 12 September 2026	Croatia; Dugo Selo	1	Fran Bošnjak	1	Ana Rumiha
XCC; 12 September 2026	Croatia; Dugo Selo	2		2	Antonela Juretić
XCC; 12 September 2026	Croatia; Dugo Selo	3		3	
XCC; 27 September 2026	Venezuela; Puerto La Cruz	1	Isaías Nil Morales Rojas	1	Yngrid Porras
XCC; 27 September 2026	Venezuela; Puerto La Cruz	2	Antonio José Marrero Morales	2	Andrea Del Mar Contreras Uribe
XCC; 27 September 2026	Venezuela; Puerto La Cruz	3	Cesar Barrios	3	Zaily Salazar
XCC; 24 October 2026	Zimbabwe; Darwendale	1		1	
XCC; 24 October 2026	Zimbabwe; Darwendale	2		2	
XCC; 24 October 2026	Zimbabwe; Darwendale	3		3	

=== E–MTB XCO ===
Date	Venue	Podium (Men)		Podium (Women)	
E–MTB XCO; 13–15 March 2026	Chile; Santiago	1	Ignacio Gallo	1	No starters
E–MTB XCO; 13–15 March 2026	Chile; Santiago	2	Michael Morales	2	No starters
E–MTB XCO; 13–15 March 2026	Chile; Santiago	3	Luis Retamal Flores	3	No starters
E–MTB XCO; 16–19 July 2026	France; Dévoluy	1	Jérôme Gilloux	1	Laura Charles
E–MTB XCO; 16–19 July 2026	France; Dévoluy	2	Loan Cheneval	2	Amandine Vidon
E–MTB XCO; 16–19 July 2026	France; Dévoluy	3	Mathis Meyniel	3	
E–MTB XCO; 17 July 2026	United States; Roanoke	1	Nick Mackie	1	Stephanie Lamer
E–MTB XCO; 17 July 2026	United States; Roanoke	2	David Kahn	2	Ashley Hendershot
E–MTB XCO; 17 July 2026	United States; Roanoke	3	Rogerio Filho	3	No starters
E–MTB XCO; 19 July 2026	Poland; Polanica-Zdrój	1	Michał Topór	1	Inga Ostafin
E–MTB XCO; 19 July 2026	Poland; Polanica-Zdrój	2	Marcin Motyka	2	Patrycja Jeziorska
E–MTB XCO; 19 July 2026	Poland; Polanica-Zdrój	3	Dawid Jona	3	Aniela Magdziarczyk
E–MTB XCO; 18 July 2026	Greece; Karyes	1	Nikolaos Georgiadis	1	Athina Tzoulaki
E–MTB XCO; 18 July 2026	Greece; Karyes	2	Theodoros Petridis	2	Despoina Vathi
E–MTB XCO; 18 July 2026	Greece; Karyes	3	Kosmas Ntavoutian	3	Varvara Fasoi
E–MTB XCO; 19 July 2026	Costa Rica; Cartago	1	Aarón Guzmán	1	
E–MTB XCO; 19 July 2026	Costa Rica; Cartago	2	Carlos Tenorio Flores	2	
E–MTB XCO; 19 July 2026	Costa Rica; Cartago	3	Alex Guzmán Mejias	3	
E–MTB XCO; 17 July 2026	Namibia; Windhoek	1	Piet Swiegers	1	Monique du Plessis
E–MTB XCO; 17 July 2026	Namibia; Windhoek	2	Eckhard Waldschmidt	2	Claudia Surén
E–MTB XCO; 17 July 2026	Namibia; Windhoek	3		3	
E–MTB XCO; 19 July 2026	Italy; Nervesa della Battaglia	1	Daniele Braidot	1	Giulia Bertoni
E–MTB XCO; 19 July 2026	Italy; Nervesa della Battaglia	2	Martino Fruet	2	Anna Oberparleiter
E–MTB XCO; 19 July 2026	Italy; Nervesa della Battaglia	3	Marco Bramati	3	Gloria Carretta
E–MTB XCO; 18 July 2026	Romania; Moieciu	1	Ovidiu Oprea	1	
E–MTB XCO; 18 July 2026	Romania; Moieciu	2	Martin Wallmen	2	
E–MTB XCO; 18 July 2026	Romania; Moieciu	3	Sebastian-Ioan Râpea	3	
E–MTB XCO; 9 August 2026	Slovakia; Oslany	1	Milan Barényi	1	Tereza Kurnická
E–MTB XCO; 9 August 2026	Slovakia; Oslany	2	Marek Mojto	2	Tatiana Kurnická
E–MTB XCO; 9 August 2026	Slovakia; Oslany	3	Lukáš Vranák	3	Silvia Porubská
E–MTB XCO; 15 August 2026	United Kingdom; Newcastleton	1	William Gell	1	Tracy Moseley
E–MTB XCO; 15 August 2026	United Kingdom; Newcastleton	2	Alex Hart	2	Cheri Mills
E–MTB XCO; 15 August 2026	United Kingdom; Newcastleton	3	Chris Buchan	3	Cath Robinson
E–MTB XCO; 25 September 2026	Venezuela; Puerto La Cruz	1	Johangel Ramírez	1	
E–MTB XCO; 25 September 2026	Venezuela; Puerto La Cruz	2	Anyelo Velázquez	2	
E–MTB XCO; 25 September 2026	Venezuela; Puerto La Cruz	3		3	
E–MTB XCO; 10 October 2026	Moldova; Chișinău	1	Dumitru Bejenari	1	Liudmila Topal
E–MTB XCO; 10 October 2026	Moldova; Chișinău	2	Dmitrii Zameatin	2	Corina Ovcearenco
E–MTB XCO; 10 October 2026	Moldova; Chișinău	3	Radu Grozinschi	3	Rahela Gheţiu

=== XCE ===
Date	Venue	Podium (Men)		Podium (Women)	
XCE; 20–22 February 2026	Philippines; Danao	1	James Carl Dela Cruz	1	Shagne Paula Yaoyao
XCE; 20–22 February 2026	Philippines; Danao	2	Mark Louwel Valderama	2	Ashley Alyssa Jalipa
XCE; 20–22 February 2026	Philippines; Danao	3	Annel Marc Batoto	3	Adel Pia Sendrijas
XCE; 13–15 March 2026	Chile; Santiago	1	Guillermo Varas	1	Misol Hernández
XCE; 13–15 March 2026	Chile; Santiago	2	Ángel Saldívar Troncoso	2	Constanza Herrera
XCE; 13–15 March 2026	Chile; Santiago	3	Deny Camilo Portilla	3	Florencia Monsálvez
XCE; 3 April 2026	Argentina; Mendoza	1	Ricardo Colque	1	Nicol Arce
XCE; 3 April 2026	Argentina; Mendoza	2	Kevin Ingrata	2	Maitã Agostina Ovejero
XCE; 3 April 2026	Argentina; Mendoza	3	Ignacio Cufré	3	Catalina Calderón
XCE; 26 April 2026	Thailand; Chanthaburi	1	Pholachat Nakthongkam	1	Pornpak Praphothang
XCE; 26 April 2026	Thailand; Chanthaburi	2	Phunsiri Sirimongkhon	2	Kanokrat Ritthidet
XCE; 26 April 2026	Thailand; Chanthaburi	3	Pongpeera Pongaryukun	3	
XCE; 16 May 2026	Slovenia; Kamnik	1	Jakob Klemenčič	1	—N/a
XCE; 16 May 2026	Slovenia; Kamnik	2	Matic Kranjec Žagar	2	—N/a
XCE; 16 May 2026	Slovenia; Kamnik	3	Jaka Tominšek	3	—N/a
XCE; 15–17 June 2026	Uzbekistan; Tashkent	1	Azizjon Soliev	1	Sevinchoy Zaripbaeva
XCE; 15–17 June 2026	Uzbekistan; Tashkent	2	Akobir Ismatilloev	2	Mohinur Xolmurodova
XCE; 15–17 June 2026	Uzbekistan; Tashkent	3	Sardor Mukhtorov	3	Aliza Rejepova
XCE; 23 June 2026	Sweden; Karlstad	1	Axel Lindh	1	Elin Karlsson
XCE; 23 June 2026	Sweden; Karlstad	2	Edvin Lindh	2	Frida Sohl
XCE; 23 June 2026	Sweden; Karlstad	3	Casper Casserstedt	3	Tova Fridstrom
XCE; 26 June 2026	Italy; Chies d'Alpago	1	Pietro Cao	1	Gaia Tormena
XCE; 26 June 2026	Italy; Chies d'Alpago	2	Giovanni Zago	2	Sophie Messmer
XCE; 26 June 2026	Italy; Chies d'Alpago	3	Paolo Costa	3	Nicole Azzetti
XCE; 4 July 2026	Romania; Mediaș	1	Ede-Károly Molnár	1	Miruna Măda
XCE; 4 July 2026	Romania; Mediaș	2	Máté Szakács	2	Giulia Pârvu
XCE; 4 July 2026	Romania; Mediaș	3	Patrick Pescaru	3	Sofia-Alexandra Zamă
XCE; 16–19 July 2026	France; Dévoluy	1	Romain Covarel	1	Isaure Medde
XCE; 16–19 July 2026	France; Dévoluy	2	Titouan Perrin-Ganier	2	Margaux Borrelly
XCE; 16–19 July 2026	France; Dévoluy	3	Quentin Luchini	3	Amandine Vidon
XCE; 16–19 July 2026	Indonesia; Bogor	1	Ihza Muhammad	1	Dela Anjar Wulan
XCE; 16–19 July 2026	Indonesia; Bogor	2	Mohammad Maydanil Arham	2	Vara Sefti Rahmadani
XCE; 16–19 July 2026	Indonesia; Bogor	3	Renoza Aldi Pratama	3	Elvia Tri Wulandari
XCE; 16–19 July 2026	Malaysia; Putrajaya	1	Muhammad Syawal Mazlin	1	Nurnabila Johari
XCE; 16–19 July 2026	Malaysia; Putrajaya	2	Sheikh Harith	2	Phi Kun Pan
XCE; 16–19 July 2026	Malaysia; Putrajaya	3	Saniy Syahmi	3	Alzarif Aufa Abdul Rahman
XCE; 17 July 2026	Estonia; Narva	1	Matthias Mõttus	1	Maribel Rannala
XCE; 17 July 2026	Estonia; Narva	2	Riko Tammepuu	2	Mairit Kaarjärv
XCE; 17 July 2026	Estonia; Narva	3	Lauri Tamm	3	Maris Kaarjärv
XCE; 17 July 2026	Ecuador; Quito	1	Erick Fierro	1	Mikela Molina
XCE; 17 July 2026	Ecuador; Quito	2	Juan Espinoza Valle	2	Miryam Núñez
XCE; 17 July 2026	Ecuador; Quito	3	Pedro Urgilés	3	Joanna Cordova Terneus
XCE; 17 July 2026	Ukraine; Chernivtsi	1		1	
XCE; 17 July 2026	Ukraine; Chernivtsi	2		2	
XCE; 17 July 2026	Ukraine; Chernivtsi	3		3	
XCE; 17 July 2026	Albania; Tirana	1		1	
XCE; 17 July 2026	Albania; Tirana	2		2	
XCE; 17 July 2026	Albania; Tirana	3		3	
XCE; 17 July 2026	Costa Rica; Cartago	1	Alejandro Castillo Garcia	1	Isabel García
XCE; 17 July 2026	Costa Rica; Cartago	2	Alejandro Rojas	2	Alison Nuñez
XCE; 17 July 2026	Costa Rica; Cartago	3	Juan Diego Rojas	3	Maria Zeledon Suárez
XCE; 17 July 2026	Paraguay; Villarrica	1		1	
XCE; 17 July 2026	Paraguay; Villarrica	2		2	
XCE; 17 July 2026	Paraguay; Villarrica	3		3	
XCE; 19 July 2026	Honduras; Siguatepeque	1	Luis López	1	
XCE; 19 July 2026	Honduras; Siguatepeque	2	Pablo Cruz	2	
XCE; 19 July 2026	Honduras; Siguatepeque	3	Josué Reyes	3	
XCE; 19 July 2026	Turkey; Nevşehir	1	Furkan Akçam	1	Nazife Tunçel
XCE; 19 July 2026	Turkey; Nevşehir	2	Samet Baştatar	2	Nisanur Acar
XCE; 19 July 2026	Turkey; Nevşehir	3	Emre Yavuz	3	Tuğçe Bitirim
XCE; 23–26 July 2026	Brazil; São José dos Campos	1	Luiz Cocuzzi	1	Iara Caetano
XCE; 23–26 July 2026	Brazil; São José dos Campos	2	Axel Kruger	2	Luiza Cocuzzi
XCE; 23–26 July 2026	Brazil; São José dos Campos	3	Gianluca Guarnieri	3	Mayara Kelly dos Santos
XCE; 26 July 2026	Singapore; Singapore	1	Riyadh Hakim	1	Tsalina Phang Yi-lin
XCE; 26 July 2026	Singapore; Singapore	2	Shazani Danish Bin Saiful Adli	2	
XCE; 26 July 2026	Singapore; Singapore	3	Vaughn Zhixing Tan	3	
XCE; 24 July 2026	Mexico; Tapalpa	1	Daniel Castillo	1	Andrea Cerda Ornelas
XCE; 24 July 2026	Mexico; Tapalpa	2	Hassan Ortiz Ramírez	2	Frida Camila Figueroa Cornejo
XCE; 24 July 2026	Mexico; Tapalpa	3	Elías Juárez Segura	3	Nabyenka García Bareño Domínguez
XCE; 2 August 2026	Serbia; Vrdnik	1	Milan Stojadinović	1	Bojana Jovanović
XCE; 2 August 2026	Serbia; Vrdnik	2	Aleksa Movrin	2	Valentina Nestorović
XCE; 2 August 2026	Serbia; Vrdnik	3		3	Helena Petrušić
XCE; 12 September 2026	Germany; Passau	1	Louis Krauss	1	Andrea Kravanja
XCE; 12 September 2026	Germany; Passau	2	Simon Gegenheimer	2	Lina Dorscht
XCE; 12 September 2026	Germany; Passau	3	Dennis Krimmel	3	Zoe Schmalzbauer
XCE; 13 September 2026	Hungary; Mosonmagyaróvár	1	Botond Olcsvári	1	Lora Oravecz
XCE; 13 September 2026	Hungary; Mosonmagyaróvár	2	Vince Dániel Kiss	2	Alexandra Deák
XCE; 13 September 2026	Hungary; Mosonmagyaróvár	3	Attila Gerely	3	
XCE; 18 September 2026	Spain; Girona	1	Alberto Mingorance	1	Ainara Elbusto
XCE; 18 September 2026	Spain; Girona	2	Miguel Díaz Pérez	2	Lucía Gómez Andreu
XCE; 18 September 2026	Spain; Girona	3	Haritz Félix Azurmendi	3	Aina Sánchez Fosses
XCE; 11 October 2026	Greece; Athens	1	Iraklis Balafas	1	Athina Tzoulaki
XCE; 11 October 2026	Greece; Athens	2	Konstantinos Berdempes	2	Despoina Vathi
XCE; 11 October 2026	Greece; Athens	3	Alexandros Karousos	3	Eirini Maria Karousou
XCE; 25 October 2026	Cyprus; Nicosia	1		1	
XCE; 25 October 2026	Cyprus; Nicosia	2		2	
XCE; 25 October 2026	Cyprus; Nicosia	3		3	
XCE; 14 November 2026	New Zealand; Hamilton	1	Joshua Cavanagh	1	Sammie Maxwell
XCE; 14 November 2026	New Zealand; Hamilton	2	Fletcher Adams	2	Kayley MacMillan
XCE; 14 November 2026	New Zealand; Hamilton	3	Lochie Brown	3	Milla Phipps

=== XCM ===
Date	Venue	Podium (Men)		Podium (Women)	
XCM; 3 April 2026	Kazakhstan; Shymkent	1	Denis Sergiyenko	1	Tatyana Geneleva
XCM; 3 April 2026	Kazakhstan; Shymkent	2	Nazarbek Beken	2	Yuliya Li
XCM; 3 April 2026	Kazakhstan; Shymkent	3	Nikita Galkin	3	Alina Spirina
XCM; 18 April 2026	Spain; Paterna del Campo	1	David Valero	1	Natalia Fischer
XCM; 18 April 2026	Spain; Paterna del Campo	2	José María Sánchez Ruiz	2	Alba Teruel Ribes
XCM; 18 April 2026	Spain; Paterna del Campo	3	Enrique Morcillo Vergara	3	Pilar Fernández
XCM; 3 May 2026	Greece; Athens	1	Andreas Stamatopoulos	1	Varvara Fasoi
XCM; 3 May 2026	Greece; Athens	2	Vasileios Vitzilaios	2	Evangelia Ntakou
XCM; 3 May 2026	Greece; Athens	3	Aristarchos Adaktylos	3	Maria Stefa
XCM; 10 May 2026	Ecuador; Penipe Canton	1	Benjamín Quinteros	1	Mikela Molina
XCM; 10 May 2026	Ecuador; Penipe Canton	2	Byron Guamá	2	Daniela Machuca
XCM; 10 May 2026	Ecuador; Penipe Canton	3	Juan Carlos Córdova	3	Kelly Reyes
XCM; 16–17 May 2026	Lithuania; Šiauliai	1	Ignas Ambrazas	1	Katažina Sosna
XCM; 16–17 May 2026	Lithuania; Šiauliai	2	Justinas Biekša	2	Greta Briedytė
XCM; 16–17 May 2026	Lithuania; Šiauliai	3	Vladas Jurkevičius	3	Agne Musajevaite
XCM; 16–17 May 2026	Mexico; Toluca	1	Amando Martínez Galván	1	Joy Harumi Méndez García
XCM; 16–17 May 2026	Mexico; Toluca	2	Luciano Esquivias Martín	2	Karla Abril Rocha López
XCM; 16–17 May 2026	Mexico; Toluca	3	Gustavo Cortes	3	
XCM; 23 May 2026	Mauritius; Le Morne	1	Yannick Lincoln	1	
XCM; 23 May 2026	Mauritius; Le Morne	2	Lucas Froget	2	
XCM; 23 May 2026	Mauritius; Le Morne	3	Thierry David	3	
XCM; 24 May 2026	Croatia; Beretinec	1	Roko Fržop	1	Dubravka Fazlić
XCM; 24 May 2026	Croatia; Beretinec	2	Fran Bošnjak	2	Kristina Lukačević
XCM; 24 May 2026	Croatia; Beretinec	3	Robert Horvat	3	Kristina Koter
XCM; 24 May 2026	Italy; Reggio Calabria	1	Fabian Rabensteiner	1	Claudia Peretti
XCM; 24 May 2026	Italy; Reggio Calabria	2	Stefano Goria	2	Mara Fumagalli
XCM; 24 May 2026	Italy; Reggio Calabria	3	Davide Foccoli	3	Chiara Gualandi
XCM; 24 May 2026	South Africa; Howick	1	Marc Pritzen	1	Hayley Preen
XCM; 24 May 2026	South Africa; Howick	2	Tristan Nortje	2	Samantha Sanders
XCM; 24 May 2026	South Africa; Howick	3	Travis Stedman	3	Sarah Maré
XCM; 6 June 2026	Slovakia; Hrabušice	1	Tomaš Višňovský	1	Martina Krahulcová
XCM; 6 June 2026	Slovakia; Hrabušice	2	Jakub Jenčuš	2	Veronika Čišecká
XCM; 6 June 2026	Slovakia; Hrabušice	3	Samuel Kováč	3	Barbora Jarinová
XCM; 14 June 2026	Norway; Østmarka	1	Eskil Evensen-Lie	1	Sunniva Dring
XCM; 14 June 2026	Norway; Østmarka	2	Ole Sigurd Rekdahl	2	Petra Rønning
XCM; 14 June 2026	Norway; Østmarka	3	Tormod Weydahl	3	Henriette Bakkeli Götz
XCM; 14 June 2026	Portugal; Seia	1	José Dias	1	Melissa Maia
XCM; 14 June 2026	Portugal; Seia	2	Guilherme Mota	2	Tânia Lima
XCM; 14 June 2026	Portugal; Seia	3	Diogo Graça	3	Marta Branco
XCM; 21 June 2026	Belgium; Malmedy	1	Wout Alleman	1	Joyce Vanderbeken
XCM; 21 June 2026	Belgium; Malmedy	2	Arne Janssens	2	Shanyl De Schoesitter
XCM; 21 June 2026	Belgium; Malmedy	3	Simon Gregoire	3	Margot Bourguignon
XCM; 21 June 2026	North Macedonia; Kruševo	1	Goran Kuzmanovski	1	Dunja Ivanova
XCM; 21 June 2026	North Macedonia; Kruševo	2	Kiril Markovski	2	
XCM; 21 June 2026	North Macedonia; Kruševo	3	Aleksandar Miloshevski	3	
XCM; 21 June 2026	Switzerland; Evolène	1	Casey South	1	Anna Weinbeer
XCM; 21 June 2026	Switzerland; Evolène	2	Martin Fanger	2	Alessia Nay
XCM; 21 June 2026	Switzerland; Evolène	3	Andrin Beeli	3	Stefanie Zahno
XCM; 12 July 2026	Costa Rica; Turrialba	1	Keyron Solís	1	Cristel Espinoza Vásquez
XCM; 12 July 2026	Costa Rica; Turrialba	2	Paolo Montoya	2	Adriana Rojas Cubero
XCM; 12 July 2026	Costa Rica; Turrialba	3	Carlos Herrera Arroyo	3	Krissia Araya Vega
XCM; 12 July 2026	United States; Roanoke	1	Cole Paton	1	Melisa Rollins
XCM; 12 July 2026	United States; Roanoke	2	Bradyn Lange	2	Deanna Mayles
XCM; 12 July 2026	United States; Roanoke	3	Toby Hassett	3	Hannah Otto
XCM; 14–19 July 2026	Colombia; Pereira	1		1	
XCM; 14–19 July 2026	Colombia; Pereira	2		2	
XCM; 14–19 July 2026	Colombia; Pereira	3		3	
XCM; 19 July 2026	Latvia; Ikšķile	1		1	
XCM; 19 July 2026	Latvia; Ikšķile	2		2	
XCM; 19 July 2026	Latvia; Ikšķile	3		3	
XCM; 4 July 2026	Lesotho; Maseru	1		1	
XCM; 4 July 2026	Lesotho; Maseru	2		2	
XCM; 4 July 2026	Lesotho; Maseru	3		3	
XCM; 8 August 2026	Austria; Mank	1	Jakob Reiter	1	Nina Mosser
XCM; 8 August 2026	Austria; Mank	2	Michael Holland	2	Lea Horngacher
XCM; 8 August 2026	Austria; Mank	3	Daniel Eichmair	3	Cornelia Holland
XCM; 15 August 2026	Iceland; Mosfellsbær	1		1	
XCM; 15 August 2026	Iceland; Mosfellsbær	2		2	
XCM; 15 August 2026	Iceland; Mosfellsbær	3		3	
XCM; 16 August 2026	United Kingdom; Newcastleton	1	Ben Askey	1	Grace Inglis
XCM; 16 August 2026	United Kingdom; Newcastleton	2	Thomas Mein	2	Isla Short
XCM; 16 August 2026	United Kingdom; Newcastleton	3	Cameron Orr	3	Kim Baptista
XCM; 16 August 2026	Turkey; Bursa	1	Ahmet Can Akpınar	1	Sevim Gerçek
XCM; 16 August 2026	Turkey; Bursa	2	Burak Abay	2	Azize Bekar
XCM; 16 August 2026	Turkey; Bursa	3	Furkan Akçam	3	Asuman Balci
XCM; 16 August 2026	Estonia; Jõulumäe	1	Markus Pajur	1	Janelle Uibokand
XCM; 16 August 2026	Estonia; Jõulumäe	2	Riko Tammepuu	2	Triin Rast
XCM; 16 August 2026	Estonia; Jõulumäe	3	Josten Vaidem	3	Mari Kaseväli
XCM; 22 August 2026	Denmark; Haderslev	1	Kristian Østergaard Andersen	1	Klara Sofie Skovgård Hansen
XCM; 22 August 2026	Denmark; Haderslev	2	Mathias Rosenberg Pedersen	2	Viktoria Knudsen
XCM; 22 August 2026	Denmark; Haderslev	3	Hector Glud Hjorth	3	Janni Spangsberg
XCM; 30 August 2026	Germany; Dünsberg	1	Andreas Seewald	1	Bettina Janas
XCM; 30 August 2026	Germany; Dünsberg	2	Jakob Hartmann	2	Tanja Priller
XCM; 30 August 2026	Germany; Dünsberg	3	Hannes Riegger	3	Friderike Schnatz
XCM; 5 September 2026	Canada; Sault Ste. Marie	1	Andrew L'Esperance	1	Haley Smith
XCM; 5 September 2026	Canada; Sault Ste. Marie	2	Emile Hamm	2	Laurie Arseneault
XCM; 5 September 2026	Canada; Sault Ste. Marie	3	Cory Wallace	3	Sara Frangos
XCM; 6 September 2026	Sweden; Boxholm	1	Edvin Elofsson	1	Amanda Bohlin
XCM; 6 September 2026	Sweden; Boxholm	2	Viktor Lindqvist	2	Sandra Salinger
XCM; 6 September 2026	Sweden; Boxholm	3	Vile Torbrink	3	Anna Johansson
XCM; 6 September 2026	Paraguay; Asuncion	1	Rogelio Melgarejo	1	Cristina Aguilera Amarilla
XCM; 6 September 2026	Paraguay; Asuncion	2	Claudio Nuñez Alves	2	Nancy Insaurralde Gómez
XCM; 6 September 2026	Paraguay; Asuncion	3	Kashi Garrido	3	Evelyn Olmedo Solis
XCM; 19 September 2026	France; Arbent	1	Hugo Drechou	1	Léna Gérault
XCM; 19 September 2026	France; Arbent	2	Axel Roudil	2	Tatiana Tournut
XCM; 19 September 2026	France; Arbent	3	Leo Bartoletti	3	Margot Moschetti
XCM; 26 September 2026	Poland; Szklarska Poręba	1	Krzysztof Łukasik	1	Paula Gorycka
XCM; 26 September 2026	Poland; Szklarska Poręba	2	Paweł Bernas	2	Alicja Matuła
XCM; 26 September 2026	Poland; Szklarska Poręba	3	Karol Ostaszewski	3	Zuzanna Krzystała
XCM; 26–27 September 2026	Australia; Canberra	1	Brendan Johnston	1	Holly Harris
XCM; 26–27 September 2026	Australia; Canberra	2	Brent Rees	2	Ella Bloor
XCM; 26–27 September 2026	Australia; Canberra	3	James Kelly	3	Katriina Dower
XCM; 26 September 2026	Romania; Păltiniș	1	Victor-Alexandru Aron	1	Miruna Măda
XCM; 26 September 2026	Romania; Păltiniș	2	George-Bogdan Duca	2	Suzanne Hilbert
XCM; 26 September 2026	Romania; Păltiniș	3	Patrick Pescaru	3	Iris-Alexandrina Samuilă
XCM; 26 September 2026	Hungary; Pécs	1	András Szatmáry	1	Barbara Benkó
XCM; 26 September 2026	Hungary; Pécs	2	Máté Endrédi	2	Regina Bruchner
XCM; 26 September 2026	Hungary; Pécs	3	Erik Fetter	3	Panna Bungyis
XCM; 10 October 2026	Namibia; Windhoek	1	Martin Freyer	1	Anri Krugel
XCM; 10 October 2026	Namibia; Windhoek	2	Xavier Papo	2	Vera Looser
XCM; 10 October 2026	Namibia; Windhoek	3	Natanael Joel	3	Delsia Janse van Vuuren
XCM; 18 October 2026	Netherlands; Valkenburg	1	Tom Schellekens	1	Sabrina Stultiens
XCM; 18 October 2026	Netherlands; Valkenburg	2	Niek Hoornsman	2	Rosa van Doorn
XCM; 18 October 2026	Netherlands; Valkenburg	3	Chris van Dijk	3	Teuntje Beekhuis
XCM; 25 October 2026	Honduras; Marcala	1	Rubén Sebastián Pavón	1	Vanessa Mejía
XCM; 25 October 2026	Honduras; Marcala	2	Miguel Urquía	2	Ninoska Andino Portillo
XCM; 25 October 2026	Honduras; Marcala	3	Osama Antonio Hernandez	3	
XCM; 25 October 2026	New Zealand; Rotorua	1	Cameron Jones	1	Maria Laurie
XCM; 25 October 2026	New Zealand; Rotorua	2	Anton Cooper	2	Mary Gray
XCM; 25 October 2026	New Zealand; Rotorua	3	James Climo	3	Laura Park
XCM; 31 October 2026	Bulgaria; Stara Zagora	1	Tsvetan Ivanov	1	Elena Dobranitsa
XCM; 31 October 2026	Bulgaria; Stara Zagora	2	Deyan Atanasov	2	Teodora Tabakova
XCM; 31 October 2026	Bulgaria; Stara Zagora	3	Viktor Tonev	3	
XCM; 8 November 2026	Venezuela; Yaracuy	1	Neluis Gómez	1	Lisbet Goncalves
XCM; 8 November 2026	Venezuela; Yaracuy	2	Franklin Lugo	2	Katherine Lindo
XCM; 8 November 2026	Venezuela; Yaracuy	3	Isaias Nil Morales Rojas	3	

=== E–XCM ===
Date	Venue	Podium (Men)		Podium (Women)	
E–XCM; 14 June 2026	Portugal; Seia	1	João Martins	1	Cátia Cristóvão
E–XCM; 14 June 2026	Portugal; Seia	2	Pedro Serras	2	Ana Santos
E–XCM; 14 June 2026	Portugal; Seia	3	Pedro Bicho	3	Andreia Dias
E–XCM; 12 July 2026	Costa Rica; Turrialba	1	Juan Felipe Mora Ureña	1	Diannye Salas Céspedes
E–XCM; 12 July 2026	Costa Rica; Turrialba	2	José Meneses	2	Adriana Arroyo
E–XCM; 12 July 2026	Costa Rica; Turrialba	3	José David Zamora	3	
E–XCM; 6 September 2026	Paraguay; Asuncion	1		1	
E–XCM; 6 September 2026	Paraguay; Asuncion	2		2	
E–XCM; 6 September 2026	Paraguay; Asuncion	3		3	
E–XCM; 10 October 2026	Namibia; Windhoek	1		1	Andreina da Costa
E–XCM; 10 October 2026	Namibia; Windhoek	2		2	Thais Diaz
E–XCM; 10 October 2026	Namibia; Windhoek	3	Nouhad Sayegh	3	
E–XCM; 8 November 2026	Venezuela; Yaracuy	1	Neluis Gómez	1	Lisbet Goncalves
E–XCM; 8 November 2026	Venezuela; Yaracuy	2	Franklin Lugo	2	Katherine Lindo
E–XCM; 8 November 2026	Venezuela; Yaracuy	3	Isaias Nil Morales Rojas	3	

=== Downhill ===
Date	Venue	Podium (Men)		Podium (Women)	
DHI; 1 February 2026	Mexico; Mexico City	1	Kaito Roldán Fragoso	1	Naomi Amoles
DHI; 1 February 2026	Mexico; Mexico City	2	Joshua Hope	2	Rebeca Silva
DHI; 1 February 2026	Mexico; Mexico City	3	Fabián Alcántar	3	Camila Aguilar Quintanar
DHI; 20–22 February 2026	Philippines; Danao	1	Eleazar Barba Jr.	1	Lea Denise Belgira
DHI; 20–22 February 2026	Philippines; Danao	2	Steve William Velayo	2	Gwen Hanna Barba
DHI; 20–22 February 2026	Philippines; Danao	3	John Aaron Bendijo	3	Kaye Baricuatro
DHI; 7–8 March 2026	Spain; Sant Andreu de la Barca	1	Ángel Suárez Alonso	1	María Pomés
DHI; 7–8 March 2026	Spain; Sant Andreu de la Barca	2	Daniel Castellanos	2	Sara Yusto
DHI; 7–8 March 2026	Spain; Sant Andreu de la Barca	3	Alex Marín	3	Mireia Pi
DHI; 12 March 2026	New Zealand; Rotorua	1	Tuhoto-Ariki Pene	1	Jenna Hastings
DHI; 12 March 2026	New Zealand; Rotorua	2	Oli Clark	2	Sacha Earnest
DHI; 12 March 2026	New Zealand; Rotorua	3	Tyler Waite	3	Kate Hastings
DHI; 18–22 March 2026	Australia; Mount Buller	1	Luke Meier-Smith	1	Elleni Turkovic
DHI; 18–22 March 2026	Australia; Mount Buller	2	Jackson Connelly	2	Ellie Smith
DHI; 18–22 March 2026	Australia; Mount Buller	3	Zac Bradley-Hudson	3	Sian A'Hern
DHI; 20–22 March 2026	Colombia; La Unión	1	Sebastian Holguin	1	Valentina Roa
DHI; 20–22 March 2026	Colombia; La Unión	2	Rafael Gutierrez Villegas	2	Luciana Polania Alzate
DHI; 20–22 March 2026	Colombia; La Unión	3	Camilo Sánchez	3	Verónica Pescador
DHI; 29 March 2026	South Africa; Cape Town	1	Rory Kirk	1	Frances du Toit
DHI; 29 March 2026	South Africa; Cape Town	2	Théo Erlangsen	2	Arielle Behr
DHI; 29 March 2026	South Africa; Cape Town	3	Johann Potgieter	3	Tashané Ehlers
DHI; 12 April 2026	Argentina; Villa La Angostura	1	Gonzalo Gajdosech	1	Catalina Calderon
DHI; 12 April 2026	Argentina; Villa La Angostura	2	Jeronimo Páez	2	Maria José Muñoz
DHI; 12 April 2026	Argentina; Villa La Angostura	3	Facundo Descalzo	3	María Belén Petcoff
DHI; 18–19 April 2026	Chile; Pumones	1	Pedro Burns	1	Paz Gallo Fuentes
DHI; 18–19 April 2026	Chile; Pumones	2	Felipe Agurto Galleguillos	2	Andrea Farías
DHI; 18–19 April 2026	Chile; Pumones	3	Benjamín Corral Gallardo	3	Sofía Dorado Larach
DHI; 25 April 2026	Cyprus; Foinikaria	1	Andreas Theodorou	1	Nadia Theocharidou
DHI; 25 April 2026	Cyprus; Foinikaria	2	Georgios Kouzis	2	
DHI; 25 April 2026	Cyprus; Foinikaria	3	Demetris Kittenis	3	
DHI; 26 April 2026	Thailand; Chanthaburi	1	Methasit Boonsane	1	Vipavee Deekaballes
DHI; 26 April 2026	Thailand; Chanthaburi	2	Bannawich Nakwong	2	Kanokrat Ritthidet
DHI; 26 April 2026	Thailand; Chanthaburi	3	Chitiphat Arsa	3	Nada Binmuhammad
DHI; 9–10 May 2026	Peru; Pachacamac	1		1	
DHI; 9–10 May 2026	Peru; Pachacamac	2		2	
DHI; 9–10 May 2026	Peru; Pachacamac	3		3	
DHI; 16–17 May 2026	Czech Republic; Ružomberok	1	Sebastian Kerl	1	Adéla Kokešová
DHI; 16–17 May 2026	Czech Republic; Ružomberok	2	Kryštof Húšť	2	Karolína Kadlecová
DHI; 16–17 May 2026	Czech Republic; Ružomberok	3	Matouš Silovský	3	Natálie Volejníková
DHI; 23–24 May 2026	Greece; Athens	1	Alexandros Topkaroglou	1	Evelina Zafeiri
DHI; 23–24 May 2026	Greece; Athens	2	Ioannis Ioannou	2	Eirini Maria Karousou
DHI; 23–24 May 2026	Greece; Athens	3	Georgios Agiomavritis	3	Ioanna Plega-Gavrilaki
DHI; 23–24 May 2026	Turkey; Palandöken	1	Emir Melik Peker	1	İremsu Çağlar
DHI; 23–24 May 2026	Turkey; Palandöken	2	Kadir İbiş	2	
DHI; 23–24 May 2026	Turkey; Palandöken	3	Eren Pirnal	3	
DHI; 24 May 2026	Portugal; Tarouca	1	Álvaro Pestana	1	Margarida Bandeira
DHI; 24 May 2026	Portugal; Tarouca	2	Tiago Ladeira	2	Ana Barbosa
DHI; 24 May 2026	Portugal; Tarouca	3	Vasco Bica	3	Hannah Heyse
DHI; 5–6 June 2026	Nepal; Kathmandu	1		1	
DHI; 5–6 June 2026	Nepal; Kathmandu	2		2	
DHI; 5–6 June 2026	Nepal; Kathmandu	3		3	
DHI; 6–7 June 2026	Japan; Gifu Prefecture	1	Shoma Tsuchiya	1	Mio Suemasa
DHI; 6–7 June 2026	Japan; Gifu Prefecture	2	Kazuki Shimizu	2	Reia Kamura
DHI; 6–7 June 2026	Japan; Gifu Prefecture	3	Kota Tanaka	3	Misato Watanabe
DHI; 15–17 June 2026	Uzbekistan; Tashkent	1	Mukhammadali Khaydarov	1	
DHI; 15–17 June 2026	Uzbekistan; Tashkent	2	Kamronbek Yuldoshev	2	
DHI; 15–17 June 2026	Uzbekistan; Tashkent	3		3	
DHI; 26–28 June 2026	Austria; Serfaus	1	Kevin Maderegger	1	Lina Frener
DHI; 26–28 June 2026	Austria; Serfaus	2	Noah Hofmann	2	Emma Bindhammer
DHI; 26–28 June 2026	Austria; Serfaus	3	Christoph Handl	3	Isabella Schatz
DHI; 27–28 June 2026	Slovakia; Mýto pod Ďumbierom	1	Ľuboš Staňo	1	Simona Kuchyňková
DHI; 27–28 June 2026	Slovakia; Mýto pod Ďumbierom	2	Maroš Krupa	2	Maria Vyhlídalová
DHI; 27–28 June 2026	Slovakia; Mýto pod Ďumbierom	3	Martin Knapec	3	Tereza Kurnická
DHI; 28 June 2026	Lithuania; Ignalina	1	Karolis Krukauskas	1	—N/a
DHI; 28 June 2026	Lithuania; Ignalina	2	Titas Urbonas	2	—N/a
DHI; 28 June 2026	Lithuania; Ignalina	3	Audrius Ragauskas	3	—N/a
DHI; 16–19 July 2026	Indonesia; Bogor	1		1	
DHI; 16–19 July 2026	Indonesia; Bogor	2		2	
DHI; 16–19 July 2026	Indonesia; Bogor	3		3	
DHI; 16–19 July 2026	Malaysia; Putrajaya	1	Amir Akbar	1	Siti Shahirah
DHI; 16–19 July 2026	Malaysia; Putrajaya	2	Tengku Mukhriz Tengku Mansor	2	Nurul Azlina Razali
DHI; 16–19 July 2026	Malaysia; Putrajaya	3	Joe Hwa Lim	3	Eddyna Nasuhar
DHI; 17 July 2026	Italy; Prali	1	Loris Revelli	1	Veronika Widmann
DHI; 17 July 2026	Italy; Prali	2	Stefano Introzzi	2	Gloria Scarsi
DHI; 17 July 2026	Italy; Prali	3	Lorenzo Mascherini	3	Eleonora Guglielmi
DHI; 17–18 July 2026	Bulgaria; Pamporovo	1	Stamen Markov	1	Denitsa Tosheva
DHI; 17–18 July 2026	Bulgaria; Pamporovo	2	Jordan Donev	2	Gergana Gospodinova
DHI; 17–18 July 2026	Bulgaria; Pamporovo	3	Roberto Vassilev	3	Anita Raicheva
DHI; 18 July 2026	Romania; Moieciu	1	Mario Popovici	1	Luana Cherecheș
DHI; 18 July 2026	Romania; Moieciu	2	Remus Bonta	2	Ana-Ilinca Neagoe
DHI; 18 July 2026	Romania; Moieciu	3	Ákos Farkas	3	
DHI; 19 July 2026	Latvia; Ikšķile	1		1	
DHI; 19 July 2026	Latvia; Ikšķile	2		2	
DHI; 19 July 2026	Latvia; Ikšķile	3		3	
DHI; 18–19 July 2026	United Kingdom; Llangynog	1	Jordan Williams	1	Harriet Harnden
DHI; 18–19 July 2026	United Kingdom; Llangynog	2	Matt Walker	2	Phoebe Gale
DHI; 18–19 July 2026	United Kingdom; Llangynog	3	Joe Breeden	3	Emily Carrick-Anderson
DHI; 19 July 2026	Chinese Taipei; Yunlin County	1		1	Chou Pei-ni
DHI; 19 July 2026	Chinese Taipei; Yunlin County	2		2	Tsai Chi-ling
DHI; 19 July 2026	Chinese Taipei; Yunlin County	3		3	Yang Jo–yun
DHI; 19 July 2026	Finland; Tampere	1	Joonas Jussila	1	Emmi Lehto
DHI; 19 July 2026	Finland; Tampere	2	Eliel Maukonen	2	Jenny Risku
DHI; 19 July 2026	Finland; Tampere	3	Matias Konttinen	3	Noora Koskinen
DHI; 19 July 2026	Kyrgyzstan; Orto-Say	1	Ilya Peretyatko	1	
DHI; 19 July 2026	Kyrgyzstan; Orto-Say	2	Aleksandr Koptev	2	
DHI; 19 July 2026	Kyrgyzstan; Orto-Say	3	Anton Ilenko	3	
DHI; 22–25 July 2026	France; Les Menuires	1	Nathan Pontvianne	1	Marine Cabirou
DHI; 22–25 July 2026	France; Les Menuires	2	Till Alran	2	Lisa Bouladou
DHI; 22–25 July 2026	France; Les Menuires	3	Loris Vergier	3	Laïs Bonnaure
DHI; 23–26 July 2026	United States; Big Bear Lake	1	Kenneth Pinkerton	1	Kailey Skelton
DHI; 23–26 July 2026	United States; Big Bear Lake	2	Dylan Maples	2	Maylei Leaneagh
DHI; 23–26 July 2026	United States; Big Bear Lake	3	Nathan Kitchen	3	Taylor Ostgaard
DHI; 24–26 July 2026	Slovenia; Kranjska Gora	1	Matej Osolin	1	Eva Zala Stergar
DHI; 24–26 July 2026	Slovenia; Kranjska Gora	2	Marko Niemiz	2	Nežka Libnik
DHI; 24–26 July 2026	Slovenia; Kranjska Gora	3	Maks Struna	3	Maša Komel
DHI; 25–26 July 2026	Brazil; Paraíba do Sul	1	Roger Vieira	1	Nara Faria
DHI; 25–26 July 2026	Brazil; Paraíba do Sul	2	Leonardo Becher	2	Larissa da Luz
DHI; 25–26 July 2026	Brazil; Paraíba do Sul	3		3	Flávia Brito
DHI; 25–26 July 2026	Canada; Sun Peaks	1	Jack Menzies	1	Gracey Hemstreet
DHI; 25–26 July 2026	Canada; Sun Peaks	2	Johnathan Helly	2	Lauren Rosser
DHI; 25–26 July 2026	Canada; Sun Peaks	3	Jakob Jewett	3	Emmy Lan
DHI; 25–26 July 2026	Ireland; Leinster	1	Oisin O'Callaghan	1	Lilian Tobin
DHI; 25–26 July 2026	Ireland; Leinster	2	Henry Kerr	2	Niamh Hanna Richards
DHI; 25–26 July 2026	Ireland; Leinster	3	Alex Hickey	3	Blaithin Sweeny
DHI; 26 July 2026	El Salvador; Ecoparque El Espino	1	José Mauricio Peña	1	
DHI; 26 July 2026	El Salvador; Ecoparque El Espino	2	Jorge Andrés Murcia Morales	2	
DHI; 26 July 2026	El Salvador; Ecoparque El Espino	3	Manuel Castellanos	3	
DHI; 1–2 August 2026	Norway; Hafjell	1	Simen Smestad	1	Veronika Ask Stuksrud
DHI; 1–2 August 2026	Norway; Hafjell	2	Elias Verstad Stubergh	2	Ingvill Marie Ydse
DHI; 1–2 August 2026	Norway; Hafjell	3	William Scheele	3	
DHI; 1–2 August 2026	Sweden; Sunne	1	Oliver Zwar	1	Mimmi Leiderth
DHI; 1–2 August 2026	Sweden; Sunne	2	Zakarias Blom Johansen	2	Alicia Dahl
DHI; 1–2 August 2026	Sweden; Sunne	3	Walle Tunsved	3	Josefin Axeland
DHI; 1–2 August 2026	Costa Rica; Colón	1	Basil Cambronero	1	Acacia Ralene Boshoff Bejarano
DHI; 1–2 August 2026	Costa Rica; Colón	2	Roberto Castillo Vaughan	2	Tara Alvarado Rivera
DHI; 1–2 August 2026	Costa Rica; Colón	3	Sebastián Anchía Chavarría	3	Carolina Chavarría Oviedo
DHI; 7–9 August 2026	Hungary; Lillafüred	1	Áron Babó	1	Csenge Anna Bokros
DHI; 7–9 August 2026	Hungary; Lillafüred	2	Patrik Cserjési	2	Borbála Tóth-Almási
DHI; 7–9 August 2026	Hungary; Lillafüred	3	Áron Mihály Horváth	3	Zsófia Rácz
DHI; 9–10 August 2026	Estonia; Kiviõli	1	Riko Mäeuibo	1	Katarina Väljako
DHI; 9–10 August 2026	Estonia; Kiviõli	2	Robert Johanson	2	Age Jaanimets
DHI; 9–10 August 2026	Estonia; Kiviõli	3	Joonas Vaikmäe	3	Ehe Järv
DHI; 16 August 2026	Iceland; Reykjavík	1	Gunnar Erik Cevers	1	Helga Lísa Kvaran
DHI; 16 August 2026	Iceland; Reykjavík	2	Jóhann Arnór Elíasson	2	Sylvía Mörk Kristinsdóttir
DHI; 16 August 2026	Iceland; Reykjavík	3	Brynjar Logi Friðriksson	3	Harpa Kristín Guðnadóttir
DHI; 11–13 September 2026	Germany; Todtnau	1	Henri Kiefer	1	Nina Hoffmann
DHI; 11–13 September 2026	Germany; Todtnau	2	Marco Lamaris	2	Karla Jörger
DHI; 11–13 September 2026	Germany; Todtnau	3	Lois Eller	3	Maxima Jaax
DHI; 13 September 2026	Switzerland; Verbier	1	Yannick Baechler	1	Lisa Baumann
DHI; 13 September 2026	Switzerland; Verbier	2	Marius Krähenbühl	2	Nina Vogelsanger
DHI; 13 September 2026	Switzerland; Verbier	3	Fridolin Amiguet	3	
DHI; 20 September 2026	Honduras; Tegucigalpa	1	Roger Elvir Rodas	1	Rossy Gisela Sevilla Alonzo
DHI; 20 September 2026	Honduras; Tegucigalpa	2	Luis Manuel Archaga Aceituno	2	
DHI; 20 September 2026	Honduras; Tegucigalpa	3	Diego Sebastián Herrera Jiménez	3	
DHI; 7–8 November 2026	Croatia; Bilice	1	Fran Bošnjak	1	
DHI; 7–8 November 2026	Croatia; Bilice	2	Sanjin Crnković	2	
DHI; 7–8 November 2026	Croatia; Bilice	3	Luka Perkov	3	

=== Enduro ===
Date	Venue	Podium (Men)		Podium (Women)	
END; 8 March 2026	Costa Rica; Heredia	1		1	
END; 8 March 2026	Costa Rica; Heredia	2		2	
END; 8 March 2026	Costa Rica; Heredia	3		3	
END; 20–22 March 2026	New Zealand; Rotorua	1	Joe Millington	1	Rae Morrison
END; 20–22 March 2026	New Zealand; Rotorua	2	Asher Hart	2	Kate Hastings
END; 20–22 March 2026	New Zealand; Rotorua	3	Daniel Self	3	Milla Phipps
END; 3 May 2026	Trinidad and Tobago; Arnos Vale	1	Tyriq Springer	1	Manuela Rueede
END; 3 May 2026	Trinidad and Tobago; Arnos Vale	2	Eamon Healy-Singh	2	Maria Gooding
END; 3 May 2026	Trinidad and Tobago; Arnos Vale	3	Jael Jessop	3	Tamara Phillip
END; 16–17 May 2026	Guatemala; Antigua Guatemala	1	Tony Martínez	1	Jennifer Margarita Arreaga
END; 16–17 May 2026	Guatemala; Antigua Guatemala	2	Marvin Spiegeler	2	Paola Barillas
END; 16–17 May 2026	Guatemala; Antigua Guatemala	3	Kenneth Zamora	3	Anika Porres
END; 22–24 May 2026	France; Brassac	1	Albin Cambos	1	Mélanie Pugin
END; 22–24 May 2026	France; Brassac	2	Alex Rudeau	2	Morgane Charre
END; 22–24 May 2026	France; Brassac	3	Marius Tenet	3	Charlotte Rey
END; 22–24 May 2026	Poland; Chełm	1	Jakub Sidzina	1	Katarzyna Burek
END; 22–24 May 2026	Poland; Chełm	2	Łukasz Szymczuk	2	Matylda Szczecińska
END; 22–24 May 2026	Poland; Chełm	3	Michał Topór	3	Julia Żarkowska
END; 24 May 2026	Spain; Monte Faro	1	Marco Veiga	1	Cristina Menéndez
END; 24 May 2026	Spain; Monte Faro	2	Bruno Jiménez	2	Sara Yusto
END; 24 May 2026	Spain; Monte Faro	3	Adrián Cuellar	3	Alba Arias
END; 24 May 2026	South Africa; Cape Town	1	Keira Duncan	1	Julia Kotze
END; 24 May 2026	South Africa; Cape Town	2	Matthew Lombardi	2	Danika Botha
END; 24 May 2026	South Africa; Cape Town	3	Jason Boulle	3	Megan Jonker
END; 6–7 June 2026	United States; Kellogg	1	Colton Peterson	1	Porsha Murdock
END; 6–7 June 2026	United States; Kellogg	2	Marco Osborne	2	Chloe Bear
END; 6–7 June 2026	United States; Kellogg	3	Myles Morgan	3	Taylor Ostgaard
END; 6–7 June 2026	Portugal; Murça	1	José Borges	1	Ana Luz
END; 6–7 June 2026	Portugal; Murça	2	Joaquin Meneses	2	
END; 6–7 June 2026	Portugal; Murça	3	Matias Camacho	3	
END; 19 June 2026	Moldova; Sipoteni	1	Dominick-Cristian Buca	1	
END; 19 June 2026	Moldova; Sipoteni	2	Marat Degtear	2	
END; 19 June 2026	Moldova; Sipoteni	3	Cătălin Grozavu	3	
END; 19–20 June 2026	Slovakia; Partizánske	1	Ľuboš Staňo	1	Simona Kuchyňková
END; 19–20 June 2026	Slovakia; Partizánske	2	Maroš Krupa	2	Mária Vyhlídalová
END; 19–20 June 2026	Slovakia; Partizánske	3	Martin Knapec	3	Tereza Kurnická
END; 1–2 August 2026	United Kingdom; Isle of Man	1	Henry Timewell	1	Chloe Taylor
END; 1–2 August 2026	United Kingdom; Isle of Man	2	William Brodie	2	Sapphire Ascroft
END; 1–2 August 2026	United Kingdom; Isle of Man	3	Isaac Batty	3	
END; 1–2 August 2026	Romania; Cheia	1	Jason Boș	1	Mădălina Stângă
END; 1–2 August 2026	Romania; Cheia	2	Sebastian Manu	2	Denisa Anghelina
END; 1–2 August 2026	Romania; Cheia	3	Andrei Mareș	3	
END; 7–8 August 2026	Iceland; Ísafjörður	1	Arnar Jónsson	1	Rakel Logadóttir
END; 7–8 August 2026	Iceland; Ísafjörður	2	Jökull Þór Kristjánsson	2	
END; 7–8 August 2026	Iceland; Ísafjörður	3	Stefán Geir Reynisson	3	
END; 8–9 August 2026	Germany; Bayreuth	1	Frederik Matz	1	Helen Weber
END; 8–9 August 2026	Germany; Bayreuth	2	Max Pfeil	2	Raphaela Richter
END; 8–9 August 2026	Germany; Bayreuth	3	Moritz Silberhorn	3	Hanna Blochberger
END; 8–9 August 2026	Ireland; Leinster	1	Kelan Grant	1	Blaithin Sweeny
END; 8–9 August 2026	Ireland; Leinster	2	Brendan Conroy	2	Leah Maunsell
END; 8–9 August 2026	Ireland; Leinster	3	Darragh Sweeny	3	Meave Baxter
END; 28–30 August 2026	Czech Republic; Malá Morávka	1	Vojtěch Bláha	1	Adéla Kokešová
END; 28–30 August 2026	Czech Republic; Malá Morávka	2	Antonín Král	2	Nela Viktorová
END; 28–30 August 2026	Czech Republic; Malá Morávka	3	Matěj Kopecký	3	Adéla Foltýnová
END; 29–30 August 2026	Bulgaria; Petrich	1	Jordan Donev	1	Veneta Zaharieva
END; 29–30 August 2026	Bulgaria; Petrich	2	Stivian Gatev	2	Stanimira Pesheva
END; 29–30 August 2026	Bulgaria; Petrich	3	Velin Doychev	3	Nelly Stoyanova
END; 5–6 September 2026	Sweden; Ulricehamn	1	Zakarias Johansen	1	Ella Mårtensson
END; 5–6 September 2026	Sweden; Ulricehamn	2	Elias Landh	2	Mimmi Leiderth
END; 5–6 September 2026	Sweden; Ulricehamn	3	Ivan Bergström	3	Else Bratteland
END; 12–13 September 2026	Canada; Bromont	1	Elliot Jamieson	1	Elly Hoskin
END; 12–13 September 2026	Canada; Bromont	2	Lief Rodgers	2	Geza Rodgers
END; 12–13 September 2026	Canada; Bromont	3	Adam Robbins	3	Camille Bernard
END; 12–13 September 2026	Slovenia; Maribor	1	Vid Peršak	1	Nežka Libnik
END; 12–13 September 2026	Slovenia; Maribor	2	Maks Struna	2	Maja Vojska
END; 12–13 September 2026	Slovenia; Maribor	3	Anže Kofjač	3	Darja Kodrič
END; 13 September 2026	Norway; Trysil Municipality	1	William Scheele	1	Anette Røssum Bastnes
END; 13 September 2026	Norway; Trysil Municipality	2	Ola Jåvold Landmark	2	Nadja Mlodyszewski
END; 13 September 2026	Norway; Trysil Municipality	3	Lars Dreyer	3	Anna Littorin Sandbu
END; 19–20 September 2026	Italy; Lizzano in Belvedere	1	Mirco Vendemmia	1	Nadine Ellecosta
END; 19–20 September 2026	Italy; Lizzano in Belvedere	2	Tommaso Francardo	2	Clarissa Carzolio
END; 19–20 September 2026	Italy; Lizzano in Belvedere	3	Matteo Berta	3	Silvia Penso
END; 9–11 October 2026	Austria; Lake Faak	1	Noah Hofmann	1	Cornelia Holland
END; 9–11 October 2026	Austria; Lake Faak	2	Julian Auer	2	Hanna Hüttenmeyer
END; 9–11 October 2026	Austria; Lake Faak	3	Matthias Stonig	3	Lisa Mitterbauer
END; 23–25 October 2026	Australia; Collie	1	Thomas Locke	1	Zana Evans
END; 23–25 October 2026	Australia; Collie	2	Andrew Hacquoil	2	Willow Long
END; 23–25 October 2026	Australia; Collie	3	Gus Kyme	3	Taylah Sherriff
END; 24–25 October 2026	Greece; Agrinio	1	Sokratis Aris Zotos	1	Eirini Maria Karousou
END; 24–25 October 2026	Greece; Agrinio	2	Georgios Agiomavritis	2	Alexandra Adam
END; 24–25 October 2026	Greece; Agrinio	3	Antonios Moutsios	3	Aikaterini Didaskalou
END; 30–31 October 2026	Israel; Swiss Forest	1	Yahav Ostfeld	1	Oryah Raz
END; 30–31 October 2026	Israel; Swiss Forest	2	Yonatan Yatom	2	Shahar Yehuda
END; 30–31 October 2026	Israel; Swiss Forest	3	Elad Shpanof	3	Carmel Danon

=== Enduro Electric ===
Date	Venue	Podium (Men)		Podium (Women)	
E–END; 8 March 2026	Costa Rica; Heredia	1		1	
E–END; 8 March 2026	Costa Rica; Heredia	2		2	
E–END; 8 March 2026	Costa Rica; Heredia	3		3	
E–END; 3 May 2026	Trinidad and Tobago; Arnos Vale	1	Marc Gill	1	
E–END; 3 May 2026	Trinidad and Tobago; Arnos Vale	2	Ryan Chin Jr.	2	
E–END; 3 May 2026	Trinidad and Tobago; Arnos Vale	3	Adrian Aquan	3	
E–END; 22–24 May 2026	France; Brassac	1	Adrien Dailly	1	Laura Charles
E–END; 22–24 May 2026	France; Brassac	2	Théo Ruhlmann	2	Soline Besson
E–END; 22–24 May 2026	France; Brassac	3	Damien Oton	3	Justine Henry
E–END; 22–24 May 2026	Poland; Chełm	1	Kamil Worwa	1	Amelia Dudek
E–END; 22–24 May 2026	Poland; Chełm	2	Robert Piekara	2	Martyna Puda
E–END; 22–24 May 2026	Poland; Chełm	3	Błażej Frątczak	3	Joanna Światłoń
E–END; 30 May 2026	Germany; Willingen	1	Johannes Fischbach	1	Helen Weber
E–END; 30 May 2026	Germany; Willingen	2	Christian Textor	2	Sofia Wiedenroth
E–END; 30 May 2026	Germany; Willingen	3	Erik Emmrich	3	Jana Urban
E–END; 6–7 June 2026	United States; Kellogg	1	Treyton Maskaly	1	Jill Kintner
E–END; 6–7 June 2026	United States; Kellogg	2	Alex Blanar	2	Kera Linn
E–END; 6–7 June 2026	United States; Kellogg	3	Drew Palmer-Leger	3	
E–END; 6–7 June 2026	Portugal; Murça	1	Tiago Ladeira	1	Ana Leite
E–END; 6–7 June 2026	Portugal; Murça	2	Sauro Agostinho	2	Margarida Bandeira
E–END; 6–7 June 2026	Portugal; Murça	3	Rafael Sousa	3	
E–END; 19 June 2026	Moldova; Sipoteni	1	Radu Grozinschii	1	
E–END; 19 June 2026	Moldova; Sipoteni	2	Piotr Castraveț	2	
E–END; 19 June 2026	Moldova; Sipoteni	3	Marcel Gorun	3	
E–END; 1–2 August 2026	United Kingdom; Isle of Man	1	Samuel Shucksmith	1	Saskia Kelly
E–END; 1–2 August 2026	United Kingdom; Isle of Man	2	Henry Stephenson	2	
E–END; 1–2 August 2026	United Kingdom; Isle of Man	3	Carl Walker	3	
E–END; 1–2 August 2026	Romania; Cheia	1	Dan Marcu	1	Adina Luca
E–END; 1–2 August 2026	Romania; Cheia	2	Darius Raduly	2	Serena Raduly
E–END; 1–2 August 2026	Romania; Cheia	3	Andrei Miia	3	Liudmila Topal
E–END; 7–8 August 2026	Iceland; Ísafjörður	1	Jökull Þór Kristjánsson	1	Rakel Logadóttir
E–END; 7–8 August 2026	Iceland; Ísafjörður	2	Arnar Jónsson	2	
E–END; 7–8 August 2026	Iceland; Ísafjörður	3	Stefán Geir Reynisson	3	
E–END; 28–30 August 2026	Czech Republic; Malá Morávka	1	Jakub Říha	1	
E–END; 28–30 August 2026	Czech Republic; Malá Morávka	2	Michal Pokštefl	2	
E–END; 28–30 August 2026	Czech Republic; Malá Morávka	3	Vojtěch Moudrý	3	
E–END; 29–30 August 2026	Bulgaria; Petrich	1	Denis Botev	1	
E–END; 29–30 August 2026	Bulgaria; Petrich	2	Angelos Varnalis	2	
E–END; 29–30 August 2026	Bulgaria; Petrich	3		3	
E–END; 23–25 October 2026	Australia; Collie	1	Austin Ridley	1	Tanya Bailey
E–END; 23–25 October 2026	Australia; Collie	2	Jordan Prochyra	2	Jessica Waldron
E–END; 23–25 October 2026	Australia; Collie	3	Michael Kennedy	3	Bree Murray
E–END; 24–25 October 2026	Greece; Agrinio	1	Efstathios Akritidis	1	
E–END; 24–25 October 2026	Greece; Agrinio	2	Vasileios Dalezios	2	
E–END; 24–25 October 2026	Greece; Agrinio	3	Dimosthenis Betsikas	3	

=== Pump Track ===
Date	Venue	Podium (Men)		Podium (Women)	
PUM; 4 June 2026	Austria; Vienna	1	Felix Schoibl	1	Lena Bauer
PUM; 4 June 2026	Austria; Vienna	2	Fabian Reithmayr	2	Elke Rabeder
PUM; 4 June 2026	Austria; Vienna	3	Thomas Stadler	3	Gloria Schnopfhagen
PUM; 11 July 2026	Sweden; Strängnäs	1	Love Sylwan	1	Felicia Klingström
PUM; 11 July 2026	Sweden; Strängnäs	2	Albin Johansson	2	Heidi-Erika Norberg
PUM; 11 July 2026	Sweden; Strängnäs	3	Max Mortensen	3	
PUM; 11–12 July 2026	Bulgaria; Sevlievo	1	Ivan Tsintsarov	1	Dayana Marinova
PUM; 11–12 July 2026	Bulgaria; Sevlievo	2	Alex Levkovits	2	Nadezhda Nedelyakova
PUM; 11–12 July 2026	Bulgaria; Sevlievo	3	Mikita Bulgarchuk	3	
PUM; 12 July 2026	Belgium; Middelkerke	1	Didi Van Tiggel	1	Julie Heusequin
PUM; 12 July 2026	Belgium; Middelkerke	2	Axl Bosch	2	Robyn Gommers
PUM; 12 July 2026	Belgium; Middelkerke	3	Mille Lenaerts	3	Lotte Wolfs
PUM; 12 July 2026	Singapore; Singapore	1	Izzadnaff Abdul Qusyairi Bin Abdul Manaf	1	
PUM; 12 July 2026	Singapore; Singapore	2	Hakim Zainol	2	
PUM; 12 July 2026	Singapore; Singapore	3	Walton Jun Rong Seah	3	
PUM; 19 July 2026	Latvia; Ikšķile	1		1	
PUM; 19 July 2026	Latvia; Ikšķile	2		2	
PUM; 19 July 2026	Latvia; Ikšķile	3		3	
PUM; 22 August 2026	Spain; Mondariz	1	Víctor López Díaz	1	Yuli Paola Rey Dubra
PUM; 22 August 2026	Spain; Mondariz	2	Iván García Comesaña	2	Alejandra Chapela Caíño
PUM; 22 August 2026	Spain; Mondariz	3	Pablo Sánchez Molina	3	
PUM; 29 August 2026	Slovakia; Košice	1	Daniel Hradský	1	Kristína Madarásová
PUM; 29 August 2026	Slovakia; Košice	2	Adrian Pastucha	2	Kristína Nováková
PUM; 29 August 2026	Slovakia; Košice	3	Filip Matiaško	3	Amélia Kissová
PUM; 12 September 2026	Hungary; Budapest	1	Márk Antal	1	Beáta Dürgő Becsei Sándorné
PUM; 12 September 2026	Hungary; Budapest	2	Gyula Kiss	2	
PUM; 12 September 2026	Hungary; Budapest	3	János Kálmán	3	
PUM; 12 September 2026	Slovenia; Pesnica pri Mariboru	1	Jan Manfredo	1	
PUM; 12 September 2026	Slovenia; Pesnica pri Mariboru	2	Nejc Heric	2	
PUM; 12 September 2026	Slovenia; Pesnica pri Mariboru	3	Paco Rui Samsa	3	
PUM; 19 September 2026	Switzerland; Ilanz/Glion	1	Sirio Grünig	1	Christa von Niederhäusern
PUM; 19 September 2026	Switzerland; Ilanz/Glion	2	Nils von Niederhäusern	2	Lena Schneider
PUM; 19 September 2026	Switzerland; Ilanz/Glion	3	Levin Grünig	3	Nicole Cavigelli
PUM; 20 September 2026	Chile; Santiago	1	Sebastián Méndez	1	Renata Urrutia
PUM; 20 September 2026	Chile; Santiago	2	Benjamín Astudillo	2	Rayen Aguayo
PUM; 20 September 2026	Chile; Santiago	3		3	
PUM; 19–20 September 2026	Romania; Bucharest	1	Marius-Achim Popovici	1	Luana Cherecheș
PUM; 19–20 September 2026	Romania; Bucharest	2	Ioan-Andrei Căprioară-Sorodoc	2	
PUM; 19–20 September 2026	Romania; Bucharest	3		3	
PUM; 1 November 2026	France; Valence	1	Thibaut Dupont	1	Lauryne Sutur
PUM; 1 November 2026	France; Valence	2	Noa Raymondiere	2	Candy Plançon
PUM; 1 November 2026	France; Valence	3	Lilian Guevelou	3	Malaury Urbani

=== Snow Bike ===
Date	Venue	Podium (Men)		Podium (Women)	
SNO; 18 January 2026	Turkey; Palandöken	1	Emir Melik Peker	1	İremsu Çağlar
SNO; 18 January 2026	Turkey; Palandöken	2	Kadir İbiş	2	Nazife Tunçel
SNO; 18 January 2026	Turkey; Palandöken	3	Abdurrahim Dönmez	3	Nisanur Acar

==== XCR ====
Date	Venue	Podium	
XCR; 14–19 July 2026	Colombia; Pereira	1	Antioquia; Genaro Ramírez; Daniela Gaviria; Stefanny Higuita; Kevin Quintero; Jhonnatan Botero
XCR; 14–19 July 2026	Colombia; Pereira	2	Cundinamarca; Samuel Andrés Bernal; Paula Nicole Ladino; Juan Sebastián Candil; Laura Camila Cagua; Iván Felipe López
XCR; 14–19 July 2026	Colombia; Pereira	3	Bogotá; Juan Esteban Donado; Angie Milena Lara; Lina Valeria Sosa; Luis Fernando Tibaduiza; Camilo Anzola
XCR; 17–19 July 2026	Spain; Arroyomolinos	1	Andalusia; Iker Pérez Ruiz; Daniela Gaviria; Irene García Crespo; Guillermo Parrado Hortigosa; Natalia Fischer; David Valero
XCR; 17–19 July 2026	Spain; Arroyomolinos	2	Catalonia; Oriol Creus Rovira; Gerard Llop; Aina Sánchez Fosses; Marta Cano; Jofre Cullell
XCR; 17–19 July 2026	Spain; Arroyomolinos	3	Valencian Community; Xavi Vidal; Elena Lloret; Raul Mira; Carolina Casares Abad; Felipe Orts
XCR; 19 July 2026	Czech Republic; Stupno	1	Dukla Praha – Nutrend Specialized SKR; Josef Kuchař; Lucie Grohová; Amálie Gottwaldová; Jan Zatloukal
XCR; 19 July 2026	Czech Republic; Stupno	2	Target 29 MTB Team; Adam Pražan; Amálie Srnská; Justýna Novotná; Jakub Mušálek
XCR; 19 July 2026	Czech Republic; Stupno	3	VIF Bike Team Stupno; Jan Rajchart; Nela Vávrová; Jolana Kroupová; Denis Vašíček
