= List of flag bearers for Costa Rica at the Olympics =

Costa Rica at the Olympics
- IOC code: CRC
- NOC: Comité Olímpico de Costa Rica
- Website: www.concrc.org (in Spanish)
- Medals: Gold 1 Silver 1 Bronze 2 Total 4

Summer appearances
- 1936; 1948–1960; 1964; 1968; 1972; 1976; 1980; 1984; 1988; 1992; 1996; 2000; 2004; 2008; 2012; 2016; 2020; 2024

Winter appearances
- 1980; 1984; 1988; 1992; 1994–1998; 2002; 2006; 2010–2026

This is a list of flag bearers who have represented Costa Rica at the Olympics.

Flag bearers carry the national flag of their country at the opening ceremony of the Olympic Games.

#	Event year	Season	Flag bearer	Sport
1	1936	Summer	Bernardo de la Guardia	Fencing
2	1964	Summer	Orlando Madrigal	Judo
3	1968	Summer	Rodolfo Castillo	Weightlifting
4	1972	Summer	Hugo Chamberlain	Shooting
5	1976	Summer	María París	Swimming
6	1980	Winter	Arturo Kinch	Alpine skiing
7	1980	Summer	María París	Swimming
8	1984	Winter		
9	1984	Summer	Mariano Lara	Shooting
10	1988	Winter	Arturo Kinch	Alpine skiing / cross-country skiing
11	1988	Summer	Sigrid Niehaus	Swimming
12	1992	Winter		
13	1992	Summer	Alvaro Guardia	Shooting
14	1996	Summer	Henry Núñez	Judo
15	2000	Summer	Karina Fernández	Triathlon
–	2002	Winter	None (Note: Costa Rica sent one athlete, but did not participate in the opening ceremony.)	–
16	2004	Summer	David Fernández	Judo
17	2006	Winter	Arthur James Barton	Cross-country skiing coach
18	2008	Summer	Allan Segura	Athletics
19	2012	Summer	Gabriela Traña	Marathon
20	2016	Summer	Nery Brenes	Athletics
21	2020	Summer	Ian Sancho	Judo
21	2020	Summer	Andrea Vargas	Athletics
22	2024	Summer	Gerald Drummond	Athletics
22	2024	Summer	Milagro Mena	Cycling

== See also ==
- Costa Rica at the Olympics
