= Costa Rica at the 1980 Summer Olympics =

- IOC code: CRC
- NOC: Comité Olímpico de Costa Rica

in Moscow
- Competitors: 29 (28 men, 1 woman) in 5 sports
- Flag bearer: María París
- Medals: Gold 0 Silver 0 Bronze 0 Total 0

Summer Olympics appearances (overview)
- 1936; 1948–1960; 1964; 1968; 1972; 1976; 1980; 1984; 1988; 1992; 1996; 2000; 2004; 2008; 2012; 2016; 2020; 2024

Costa Rica competed at the 1980 Summer Olympics in Moscow, USSR. The Costa Rican contingent comprised 29 competitors in five sports. Maria del Milagro Paris, a swimmer, was the only woman among Costa Rican competitors.

== Archery ==
In its second archery competition at the Olympics, Costa Rica again entered two men.

Men's individual

- Juan Wedel — 2146 points (→ 35th place)
- Jorge Murillo — 2127 points (→ 36th place)

== Football ==
=== Preliminary round (group D) ===
July 21, 1980 Costa Rica - Iraq 0-3 (0–1) Republican Stadium, Kyiv

July 23, 1980 Yugoslavia - Costa Rica 3-2 (2–1) Dinamo Stadium, Minsk

July 25, 1980 Finland - Costa Rica 3-0 (1–0) Republican Stadium, Kyiv

=== Final standings group D ===
1. Yugoslavia 3 2 1 0 ( 6- 3) 5 *
2. Iraq 3 1 2 0 ( 4- 1) 4 *
3. Finland 3 1 1 1 ( 3- 2) 3
4. Costa Rica 3 0 0 3 ( 2- 9) 0
- Qualified for quarter-finals

=== Team roster ===
Head coach: (Spain) Antonio Moyano

No.	Pos.	Player	DoB	Age	Caps	Club	Tournament games	Tournament goals	Minutes played	Sub off	Sub on	Cards yellow/red
1	GK	Julio Morales	May 23, 1957	23	?	(Costa Rica) C.S. Cartaginés	3	0	270	0	0	0
2	DF	Javier Masís	April 16, 1953	27	?	(Costa Rica) Deportivo Saprissa	3	0	249	1	0	0
3	DF	Ricardo García	Jul 31, 1955	24	?	(Costa Rica) Puntarenas	3	0	270	0	0	0
4	DF	Carlos Toppings	Apr 7, 1953	27	?	(Costa Rica) Puntarenas	3	0	270	0	0	0
5	DF	Carlos Jiménez	Jun 27, 1954	26	?	(Costa Rica) C.S. Cartaginés	1	0	14	1	0	0
6	DF	Dennis Marshall	Dec 18, 1959	20	?	(Costa Rica) ML Limón	2	0	52	0	2	0
7	MD	Francisco Hernández	Jul 11,1949	31	?	(Costa Rica) Deportivo Saprissa	3	0	270	0	0	0
8	MD	Tomás Velásquez	Dec 16, 1957	22	?	(Costa Rica) Puntarenas	3	0	270	0	0	0
9	FW	Jorge White	Nov 12, 1957	22	?	(Costa Rica) LD Alajuelense	3	1	270	0	0	0
10	MD	Róger Alvarez	Nov 13, 1952	27	?	(Costa Rica) Herediano	3	0	160	3	0	0
11	FW	Marvin Obando	Apr 4, 1960	20	?	(Costa Rica) Herediano	3	0	270	0	0	0
12	DF	Minor Alpízar	Sep 27, 1959	20	?	(Costa Rica) Ramonense	2	0	166	0	1	0
13	MD	William Avila	Oct 27, 1956	23	?	(Costa Rica) San Carlos	1	0	30	0	1	0
14	FW	Omar Arroyo	May 22, 1955	25	?	(Costa Rica) Alajuelense	3	1	270	0	0	0
15	FW	Luis Fernández	Apr 02, 1953	20	?	(Costa Rica) Deportivo Saprissa	1	0	59	1	0	0
16	MD	Herberth Quesada	Sep 28, 1959	20	?	(Costa Rica) C.S. Cartaginés	2	0	80	0	2	0
17	GK	Carlos Bismark Duarte			?	(Costa Rica) Puntarenas	0	0	0	0	0	0

== Judo ==
Men's 60 kg (Extra-Lightweight)

- Ronny Sanabria (Note: also competed in the 1984 Summer Olympics) (13th place)

Men's 65 kg (Half-Lightweight)

- Alvaro Sanabria (=19th place)

Men's 71 kg (Lightweight)

- Manuel Chavez (=19th place)

== Shooting ==
Mixed 25 metre rapid fire pistol

- Marco Hidalgo (=31st place)

Mixed 50 metre pistol

- Mariano Lara (Note: also competed in the 1984 Summer Olympics and in the 1988 Summer Olympics) (26th place)
- Rodrigo Ruiz (Note: also competed in the 1968 Summer Olympics) (29th place)
- Mixed 50 metre rifle prone
- Roger Cartín (53th place)
- Mauricio Alvarado (54th place)

Mixed 50 metre rifle three positions

- Mauricio Alvarado (38th place)
- Roger Cartín (39th place)

Mixed skeet

- Álvaro Guardia (Note: also competed in the 1992 Summer Olympics) (=44th place)

== Swimming ==
Event	Athlete	Result
Men's 200 metre breaststroke	Andrey Aguilar	17th
Men's 100 metre butterfly	Andrey Aguilar	25th
Men's 200 metre butterfly	Andrey Aguilar	19th
Men's 400 metre individual medley	Andrey Aguilar	22nd
Women's 100 metre freestyle	María París (Note: also competed in the 1976 Summer Olympics)	21st
Women's 200 metre freestyle	María París	did not start
Women's 100 metre backstroke	María París	22nd
Women's 200 metre backstroke	María París	did not start
Women's 100 metre butterfly	María París	6th
Women's 200 metre butterfly	María París	6th
