= Costa Rica at the 1968 Summer Olympics =

- IOC code: CRC
- NOC: Comité Olímpico de Costa Rica

in Mexico City
- Competitors: 18 (17 men, 1 woman) in 6 sports
- Flag bearer: Rodolfo Castillo
- Medals: Gold 0 Silver 0 Bronze 0 Total 0

Summer Olympics appearances (overview)
- 1936; 1948–1960; 1964; 1968; 1972; 1976; 1980; 1984; 1988; 1992; 1996; 2000; 2004; 2008; 2012; 2016; 2020; 2024

Costa Rica competed at the 1968 Summer Olympics in Mexico City, Mexico. Eighteen competitors, seventeen men and one woman, took part in eighteen events in six sports. Costa Rica did not win any medals at the 1968 Games.

== Athletics ==
Women's 400 metres

- Jean Robotham
  - Round 1 — 58.2 s (→ 8th in heat, did not advance)

Men's 5000 metres

- Rafael Ángel Pérez
  - Round 1 — 15:41.4 min (→ 12th in heat, did not advance)

Men's 10,000 metres

- Rafael Ángel Pérez — 32:14.6 min (→ 31st place)

Men's marathon

- Rafael Ángel Pérez — DNF (→ no ranking)

Women's high jump

- Sandra Johnson
  - Qualification — DNS (→ no ranking)

Women's long jump

- Jean Robotham
  - Qualification — 4.75 m (→ no ranking)

Women's pentathlon

- Jean Robotham
  - 80 m hurdles — 13.4 s (→ 712 points)
  - Shot put — 8.73 m (→ 615 points)
  - High jump — NM (→ 0 points)
  - Long jump — 4.74 m (→ 686 points)
  - 100 m hurdles — 25.4 s (→ 896 points)
  - Total — 2909 pts (→ 32nd place)

== Boxing ==
Light welterweight (63.5 kg)

- José Marín
  - Round 2 - Lost to Issaka Dabore of Niger

Light middleweight (71 kg)

- Walter Campos
  - Round 1 - Lost to Stephen Thega of Kenya

== Cycling ==
Five cyclists represented Costa Rica in 1968.

Individual road race

- Miguel Sánchez — 5:20:59.18 hrs (→ 63rd place)
- José Sánchez — DNF (→ no ranking)
- José Manuel Soto — DNF (→ no ranking)
- Humberto Solano — DNF (→ no ranking)

Team time trial

- José Sánchez, José Manuel Soto, Miguel Sánchez, Adrián Solano — 2:36:25.79 hrs (→ 27th place)

== Shooting ==
Five shooters, all men, represented Costa Rica in 1968.

50 m pistol

- Antonio Mora — 499 pts (→ 67th place)
- Rodrigo Ruiz — 485 pts (→ 68th place)

50 m rifle, three positions

- Hugo Chamberlain — 1064 pts (→ 57th place)

50 m rifle, prone

- Carlos Pacheco — 587 pts (→ 52nd place)
- Hugo Chamberlain — 583 pts (→ 66th place)

Skeet

- Carlos Pacheco — 176 pts (→ 42nd place)
- Jorge André — 75 pts (→ 51st place)

== Swimming ==
Men's 100 metres freestyle

- Luis Aguilar
  - Heats — 1:04.5 min (→ 7th in heat, did not advance)

Men's 200 metres freestyle

- Edgar Miranda
  - Heats — DNS (→ no ranking)

== Weightlifting ==
Middleweight

- Luis Fonseca
  - Press — 107.5 kg
  - Snatch — 97.5 kg
  - Jerk — 130.0 kg
  - Total — 335.0 kg (→ 17th place)

Light heavyweight

- Rodolfo Castillo
  - Press — 112.5 kg
  - Snatch — 105.0 kg
  - Jerk — 140.0 kg
  - Total — 357.5 kg (→ 21st place)

Middle heavyweight

- Fernando Esquivel
  - Press — 120.0 kg
  - Snatch — 105.0 kg
  - Jerk — 145.0 kg
  - Total — 370.0 kg (→ 23rd place)
