= Alpine skiing at the 1992 Winter Olympics – Men's giant slalom =

Men's giant slalom at the XVI Olympic Winter Games
- Alpine skiing
- Venue: Val d'Isère
- Date: February 18, 1992
- Competitors: 131 from 47 nations
- Winning time: 2:06.98

Medalists
1st place, gold medalist(s)		Alberto Tomba	Italy
2nd place, silver medalist(s)		Marc Girardelli	Luxembourg
3rd place, bronze medalist(s)		Kjetil André Aamodt	Norway

The Men's giant slalom competition of the Albertville 1992 Olympics was held at Val d'Isère.

The defending world champion was Rudolf Nierlich of Austria, while Italy's Alberto Tomba was the defending World Cup giant slalom champion and leader of the 1992 World Cup.

== Results ==
Rank	Name	Country	Run 1	Run 2	Total	Difference
1st place, gold medalist(s)	Alberto Tomba	Italy	1:04.57	1:02.41	2:06.98	-
2nd place, silver medalist(s)	Marc Girardelli	Luxembourg	1:04.70	1:02.60	2:07.30	+0.32
3rd place, bronze medalist(s)	Kjetil André Aamodt	Norway	1:04.81	1:03.01	2:07.82	+0.84
4	Paul Accola	Switzerland	1:04.88	1:03.14	2:08.02	+1.04
5	Ole Kristian Furuseth	Norway	1:05.63	1:02.53	2:08.16	+1.18
6	Günther Mader	Austria	1:05.42	1:03.38	2:08.80	+1.82
7	Rainer Salzgeber	Austria	1:05.72	1:03.11	2:08.83	+1.85
8	Fredrik Nyberg	Sweden	1:06.09	1:02.91	2:09.00	+2.02
9	Josef Polig	Italy	1:06.17	1:03.28	2:09.45	+2.47
9	Hubert Strolz	Austria	1:06.75	1:02.70	2:09.45	+2.47
11	Hans Pieren	Switzerland	1:06.34	1:03.23	2:09.57	+2.59
12	Christian Mayer	Austria	1:06.23	1:03.83	2:10.06	+3.08
13	Michael von Grünigen	Switzerland	1:06.95	1:03.72	2:10.67	+3.69
13	Stéphane Exartier	France	1:06.87	1:03.80	2:10.67	+3.69
15	Günther Marxer	Liechtenstein	1:06.69	1:04.46	2:11.15	+4.17
16	Gregor Grilc	Slovenia	1:06.80	1:04.70	2:11.50	+4.52
17	Sergio Bergamelli	Italy	1:06.95	1:04.80	2:11.75	+4.77
18	Franck Piccard	France	1:07.14	1:04.79	2:11.93	+4.95
19	Alain Feutrier	France	1:07.11	1:04.89	2:12.00	+5.02
20	Rob Parisien	United States	1:07.11	1:04.92	2:12.03	+5.05
21	Kiminobu Kimura	Japan	1:07.20	1:04.90	2:12.10	+5.12
22	Jure Košir	Slovenia	1:07.41	1:04.82	2:12.23	+5.25
23	Mitja Kunc	Slovenia	1:07.48	1:05.40	2:12.88	+5.90
24	Andrej Miklavc	Slovenia	1:07.91	1:05.04	2:12.95	+5.97
25	Casey Puckett	United States	1:08.17	1:05.08	2:13.25	+6.27
26	Achim Vogt	Liechtenstein	1:08.68	1:06.02	2:14.70	+7.72
27	Vicente Tomas	Spain	1:09.15	1:06.40	2:15.55	+8.57
28	Simon Wi Rutene	New Zealand	1:09.52	1:06.09	2:15.61	+8.63
29	Takuya Ishioka	Japan	1:09.28	1:06.64	2:15.92	+8.94
30	Petar Dichev	Bulgaria	1:09.85	1:06.53	2:16.38	+9.40
31	Xavier Ubeira	Spain	1:09.75	1:07.31	2:17.06	+10.08
32	Ricardo Campo	Spain	1:10.15	1:07.62	2:17.77	+10.79
33	Lyubomir Popov	Bulgaria	1:10.72	1:07.29	2:18.01	+11.03
34	Marián Bíreš	Czechoslovakia	1:10.98	1:07.13	2:18.11	+11.13
35	Rob Crossan	Canada	1:10.69	1:07.88	2:18.57	+11.59
36	Gerard Escoda	Andorra	1:10.70	1:07.99	2:18.69	+11.71
37	Peter Jurko	Czechoslovakia	1:10.65	1:08.50	2:19.15	+12.17
38	Nahum Orobitg	Andorra	1:11.37	1:07.93	2:19.30	+12.32
39	Willy Raine	Canada	1:11.30	1:08.76	2:20.06	+13.08
40	Bill Gaylord	Great Britain	1:12.04	1:08.62	2:20.66	+13.68
41	Borislav Dimitrachkov	Bulgaria	1:12.08	1:09.57	2:21.65	+14.67
42	Pierre Kőszáli	Hungary	1:12.73	1:10.63	2:23.36	+16.38
43	Gavin Forsyth	Great Britain	1:13.51	1:10.72	2:24.23	+17.25
44	Örnólfur Valdimarsson	Iceland	1:13.88	1:11.14	2:25.02	+18.04
45	Nils Gelbjerg-Hansen	Denmark	1:14.04	1:12.45	2:26.49	+19.51
46	Marcin Szafrański	Poland	1:15.06	1:12.34	2:27.40	+20.42
47	Agustín Neiman	Argentina	1:16.44	1:11.87	2:28.31	+21.33
48	Emilian Focşeneanu	Romania	1:15.48	1:13.52	2:29.00	+22.02
49	Alexis Racloz	Chile	1:16.50	1:12.77	2:29.27	+22.29
50	Balázs Tornay	Hungary	1:16.71	1:13.00	2:29.71	+22.73
51	Mauricio Rotella	Chile	1:15.92	1:14.52	2:30.44	+23.46
52	Jakub Malczewski	Poland	1:15.86	1:14.81	2:30.67	+23.69
53	Aurel Foiciuc	Romania	1:16.03	1:14.79	2:30.82	+23.84
54	Gáston Begue	Argentina	1:17.22	1:13.94	2:31.16	+24.18
55	Diego Margozzini	Chile	1:17.43	1:15.89	2:33.32	+26.34
56	Péter Kristály	Hungary	1:18.34	1:16.04	2:34.38	+27.40
57	Elias Majdalani	Lebanon	1:18.32	1:17.45	2:35.77	+28.79
58	Zoran Perušina	Yugoslavia	1:18.95	1:17.07	2:36.02	+29.04
59	Jason Gasperoni	San Marino	1:20.74	1:17.61	2:38.35	+31.37
60	Taner Üstündağ	Turkey	1:20.44	1:18.51	2:38.95	+31.97
61	Alekhis Fotiadis	Cyprus	1:22.01	1:17.98	2:39.99	+33.01
62	John Campbell	Virgin Islands	1:20.68	1:19.35	2:40.03	+33.05
63	Keith Fraser	Swaziland	1:21.93	1:19.83	2:41.76	+34.78
64	Sérgio Schuler	Brazil	1:22.31	1:20.30	2:42.61	+35.63
65	Carlos Mier y Terán	Mexico	1:22.24	1:22.49	2:44.73	+37.75
66	Lamine Guèye	Senegal	1:21.60	1:23.38	2:44.98	+38.00
67	Ahmet Demir	Turkey	1:23.00	1:22.26	2:45.26	+38.28
67	Kim Chol-ryong	North Korea	1:23.24	1:22.02	2:45.26	+38.28
69	Andreas Vasili	Cyprus	1:22.86	1:23.40	2:46.26	+39.28
70	Cevdet Can	Turkey	1:23.62	1:22.78	2:46.40	+39.42
71	Michael Teruel	Philippines	1:24.13	1:22.71	2:46.84	+39.86
72	Eduardo Ampudia	Mexico	1:23.07	1:24.53	2:47.60	+40.62
73	Marcelo Apovian	Brazil	1:23.07	1:24.97	2:48.04	+41.06
74	Alphonse Gomis	Senegal	1:24.29	1:23.79	2:48.08	+41.10
75	Yakup Kadri Birinci	Turkey	1:24.73	1:23.39	2:48.12	+41.14
76	Sokratis Aristodimou	Cyprus	1:25.03	1:23.13	2:48.16	+41.18
77	Guillermo Avila	Bolivia	1:24.68	1:26.09	2:50.77	+43.79
78	Brahim Ait Sibrahim	Morocco	1:26.81	1:27.41	2:54.22	+47.24
79	German Sánchez	Mexico	1:27.29	1:29.42	2:56.71	+49.73
80	Kamel Guerri	Algeria	1:28.85	1:34.92	3:03.77	+56.79
81	Chen Tong-Jong	Chinese Taipei	1:31.48	1:34.51	3:05.99	+59.01
82	Nanak Chand Thakur	India	1:31.98	1:37.05	3:09.03	+62.05
83	Daniel Stahle	Bolivia	1:33.56	1:38.80	3:12.36	+65.38
84	Mustapha Naitlhou	Morocco	1:38.11	1:39.21	3:17.32	+70.34
85	Mourad Guerri	Algeria	1:28.34	1:51.99	3:20.33	+73.35
86	Noureddine Bouchaal	Morocco	1:38.40	1:43.90	3:22.30	+75.32
87	Carlos Aramayo	Bolivia	1:38.83	1:45.46	3:24.29	+77.31
88	Dany Abounaoum	Lebanon	1:37.40	1:46.99	3:24.39	+77.41
89	José-Manuel Bejarano	Bolivia	1:36.47	1:50.88	3:27.35	+80.37
90	Julián Muñoz	Costa Rica	1:47.78	1:58.73	3:46.51	+99.53
91	Alejandro Preinfalk	Costa Rica	2:04.91	2:44.15	4:49.06	+162.08
-	Johan Wallner	Sweden	1:05.64	DNF	-	-
-	Steve Locher	Switzerland	1:05.80	DNF	-	-
-	Peter Roth	Germany	1:07.68	DQ	-	-
-	Matt Grosjean	United States	1:07.76	DNF	-	-
-	Armin Bittner	Germany	1:07.77	DNF	-	-
-	Jorge Pujol	Spain	1:09.20	DNF	-	-
-	Ramon Rossell	Andorra	1:12.28	DNF	-	-
-	Victor Gómez	Andorra	1:12.87	DNF	-	-
-	Tsuyoshi Tomii	Japan	1:13.36	DNF	-	-
-	Sean Langmuir	Great Britain	1:13.72	DNF	-	-
-	Attila Bónis	Hungary	1:13.98	DNF	-	-
-	Hur Seung-Wook	South Korea	1:13.99	DQ	-	-
-	Carlos Espiasse	Argentina	1:16.77	DNF	-	-
-	Thomas Lefousi	Greece	1:17.22	DNF	-	-
-	Choi Yong-Hee	South Korea	1:17.53	DNF	-	-
-	Hans Egger	Brazil	1:27.47	DNF	-	-
-	Jean Khalil	Lebanon	1:28.07	DQ	-	-
-	Fábio Igel	Brazil	1:28.83	DNF	-	-
-	Ong Ching-Ming	Chinese Taipei	1:38.66	DNF	-	-
-	Lal Chuni	India	1:39.56	DNF	-	-
-	Gabriel Chernacov	Costa Rica	2:11.34	DNF	-	-
-	Lasse Kjus	Norway	DNF	-	-	-
-	Patrick Holzer	Italy	DNF	-	-	-
-	Didrik Marksten	Norway	DNF	-	-	-
-	Markus Wasmeier	Germany	DNF	-	-	-
-	Chris Puckett	United States	DNF	-	-	-
-	Marco Büchel	Liechtenstein	DNF	-	-	-
-	Kristinn Björnsson	Iceland	DNF	-	-	-
-	Vedran Pavlek	Croatia	DNF	-	-	-
-	Federico Van Ditmar	Argentina	DNF	-	-	-
-	Ioannis Kapraras	Greece	DNF	-	-	-
-	Nicola Ercolani	San Marino	DNF	-	-	-
-	Jorge Eduardo Ballesteros	Mexico	DNF	-	-	-
-	Rejmon Horo	Yugoslavia	DNF	-	-	-
-	Enis Bećirbegović	Yugoslavia	DNF	-	-	-
-	Martin Chernacov	Costa Rica	DNF	-	-	-
-	Igor Latinović	Yugoslavia	DQ	-	-	-
-	El-Hassan Mahta	Morocco	DQ	-	-	-
-	Raymond Keyrouz	Lebanon	DQ	-	-	-
