= Costa Rica at the 1984 Summer Olympics =

- IOC code: CRC
- NOC: Comité Olímpico de Costa Rica

in Los Angeles
- Competitors: 30 in 5 sports
- Flag bearer: Mariano Lara
- Medals: Gold 0 Silver 0 Bronze 0 Total 0

Summer Olympics appearances (overview)
- 1936; 1948–1960; 1964; 1968; 1972; 1976; 1980; 1984; 1988; 1992; 1996; 2000; 2004; 2008; 2012; 2016; 2020; 2024

Costa Rica competed at the 1984 Summer Olympics in Los Angeles, United States. The Costa Rican contingent comprised 30 competitors in 5 sports. They did not win any medals.

== Athletics ==
Men's 100 metres

- Glen Abrahams (7th place, Heat 10) (→ did not advance)

Men's 200 metres

- Glen Abrahams (8th place, Heat 2) (→ did not advance)

Men's 5000 metres

- Orlando Mora
  - Heat — 14:33.49 (→ did not advance)

Men's 10,000 metres

- Orlando Mora
  - Heat — 30:49.43 (→ did not advance)

Men's Marathon

- Ronald Lanzoni (Note: also competed in the 1980 Summer Olympics) — did not finish (→ no ranking)

== Football ==
=== Men's team competition ===
- Preliminary Round (Group D)
  - Costa Rica – United States 0 – 3
  - Costa Rica – Egypt 1 – 4
  - Costa Rica – Italy 1 – 0
- Quarter Finals
  - → Did not advance
- Team Roster:
  - ( 1.) Marco Antonio Rojas
  - ( 4.) César Hines
  - ( 5.) Marvin Obando
  - ( 6.) German Chavarria
  - ( 7.) Juan Arnoldo Cayasso
  - ( 8.) Carlos Santana
  - ( 9.) Leonidas Flores
  - (10.) Enrique Rivers
  - (11.) Evaristo Coronado
  - (12.) Minor Alpizar
  - (13.) Carlos Toppings
  - (14.) Guillermo Guardia
  - (15.) Enrique Díaz
  - (16.) Álvaro Solano
  - (17.) Miguel Simpson
  - (18.) Luis Galagarza
  - (22.) Alejandro González

== Judo ==
Men's extra lightweight

- Ronny Sanabria (=18th)

Men's half-lightweight

- Andrés Sancho (=32nd)

Men's lightweight

- Alvaro Sanabria (=19th)

Men's half-middleweight

- Javier Condor (=34th)

== Shooting ==
Men's 50 metre pistol

- Mariano Lara (Note: also competed at the 1980 and 1988 Summer Olympics) (25th)

Men's 10 metre air rifle

- Roger Cartín (52nd)

Women's 10 metre air rifle

- Elizabeth Jagush (Note: also competed as Elizabeth Bourland for the United States at the 1996 Summer Olympics) (32nd)

== Swimming ==
| Event | Athlete | Result |
|---|---|---|
| Men's 200 metre breaststroke | Andrey Aguilar | Heat 4; 2:27.69 - 29th |
| Men's 200 metre butterfly | Andrey Aguilar | Heat 5; 2:08.74 - 30th |
| Men's 200 metre individual medley | Andrey Aguilar | Heat 1; 2:11.63 - 26th |
