= Costa Rica at the 1992 Summer Olympics =

- IOC code: CRC
- NOC: Comité Olímpico de Costa Rica

in Barcelona
- Competitors: 16 (11 men, 5 women) in 6 sports
- Flag bearer: Alvaro Guardia
- Medals: Gold 0 Silver 0 Bronze 0 Total 0

Summer Olympics appearances (overview)
- 1936; 1948–1960; 1964; 1968; 1972; 1976; 1980; 1984; 1988; 1992; 1996; 2000; 2004; 2008; 2012; 2016; 2020; 2024

Costa Rica competed at the 1992 Summer Olympics in Barcelona, Spain. 16 competitors, 11 men and 5 women, took part in 18 events in 6 sports. They did not win any medals.

== Competitors ==
The following is the list of number of competitors in the Games.

Sport	Men	Women	Total
Archery	0	1	1
Athletics	6	2	8
Canoeing	3	1	4
Fencing	1	0	1
Shooting	1	0	1
Swimming	0	1	1
Total	11	5	16

== Archery ==
In its third archery competition at the Olympics, and first since 1980, Costa Rica entered a female archer for the first time. She did not advance to the elimination rounds.

Women's Individual Competition:

- Patricia Obregon
  - Ranking round — 57th place (0-0)

== Athletics ==
Men's 100m metres

- Henry Daley Colphon
  - Heat — 11.11 (→ did not advance)

Men's 5,000 metres

- José Luis Molina
  - Heat — 14:09.22 (→ did not advance)

Men's 10,000 metres

- Miguel Angel Vargas
  - Heat — 30:13.06 (→ did not advance)

Men's Marathon

- Luis Lopez — 2:30.26 (→ 65th place)

Men's 400m Hurdles

- Alex Foster
  - Heat — 52.93 (→ did not advance, no ranking)

Women's Marathon

- Vilma Peña — 3:03.34 (→ 33rd place)

== Canoeing ==
Men's Kayak Singles Slalom

- Joaquin García
- Ferdinand Steinvorth
- Gabriel Álvarez

Women's Kayak Singles Slalom

- Gilda Montenegro

== Fencing ==
Men's sabre

- Esteban Mullins

== Shooting ==
Mixed Skeet

- Alvaro Guardia

== Swimming ==
Women's 100m Backstroke

- Silvia Poll
  - Heat – 1:02.88
  - B-Final – 1:03.57 (→ 15th place)

Women's 200m Backstroke

- Silvia Poll
  - Heat – 2:11.66
  - Final – 2:12.97 (→ 7th place)

== See also ==
- Costa Rica at the 1991 Pan American Games
