= Costa Rica at the 1976 Summer Olympics =

- IOC code: CRC
- NOC: Comité Olímpico de Costa Rica

in Montreal
- Competitors: 5 (4 men, 1 woman) in 4 sports
- Flag bearer: María París
- Medals: Gold 0 Silver 0 Bronze 0 Total 0

Summer Olympics appearances (overview)
- 1936; 1948–1960; 1964; 1968; 1972; 1976; 1980; 1984; 1988; 1992; 1996; 2000; 2004; 2008; 2012; 2016; 2020; 2024

Costa Rica competed at the 1976 Summer Olympics in Montreal, Quebec, Canada. Five competitors, four men and one woman, took part in nine events in four sports.

== Archery ==
In its first archery competition at the Olympics, Costa Rica entered two male archers. They included the last place finisher.

Men's Individual Competition:

- Juan Wedel – 2165 points (→ 34th place)
- Luis Gonzalez – 2005 points (→ 37th place)

== Cycling ==
One cyclist represented Costa Rica in 1976.

Individual road race

- Carlos Alvarado – did not finish (→ no ranking)

== Shooting ==
One shooter represented Costa Rica in 1976.

50 m rifle, three positions

- Hugo Chamberlain

50 m rifle, prone

- Hugo Chamberlain

== Swimming ==
- Maria del Milagro Paris
