= Costa Rica at the 1996 Summer Olympics =

- IOC code: CRC
- NOC: Comité Olímpico de Costa Rica
- Website: www.concrc.org (in Spanish)

in Atlanta
- Competitors: 11 (6 men and 5 women) in 6 sports
- Flag bearer: Henry Núñez
- Medals Ranked 49th: Gold 1 Silver 0 Bronze 0 Total 1

Summer Olympics appearances (overview)
- 1936; 1948–1960; 1964; 1968; 1972; 1976; 1980; 1984; 1988; 1992; 1996; 2000; 2004; 2008; 2012; 2016; 2020; 2024

Costa Rica competed at the 1996 Summer Olympics in Atlanta, United States. Claudia Poll won the nation's first ever gold medal. This was Costa Rica's second Olympic medal in 10 Olympic appearances. The only previous one, a silver medal, was won by Claudia's sister Silvia Poll at the 1988 Summer Olympics in Seoul, South Korea.

== Medalists ==
Medal	Name	Sport	Event	Date
Gold	Claudia Poll	Swimming	Women's 200 metre freestyle	21 July

== Competitors ==
The following is the list of number of competitors in the Games.

Sport	Men	Women	Total
Athletics	1	1	2
Canoeing	1	1	2
Cycling	1	0	1
Diving	0	1	1
Judo	2	0	2
Swimming	1	2	3
Total	6	5	11

== Athletics ==
Men
Track and road events

Athlete	Event	Heats		Quarterfinal		Semifinal		Final	
Athlete	Event	Result	Rank	Result	Rank	Result	Rank	Result	Rank
José Luis Molina	Marathon	—N/a						2:17:49	24

Women
Track and road events

Athlete	Event	Heats		Quarterfinal		Semifinal		Final	
Athlete	Event	Result	Rank	Result	Rank	Result	Rank	Result	Rank
Zoila Stewart	400 metres	52.66	33	Did not advance					

== Canoeing ==
=== Slalom ===
Athlete	Event	Run 1	Rank	Run 2	Rank	Best	Rank
Roger Madrigal	Men's K-1	180.34	30	219.97	40	180.34	39
Gilda Montenegro	Women's K-1	371.97	28	265.93	24	265.93	28

== Cycling ==
=== Mountain biking ===
Athlete	Event	Time	Rank
José Andrés Brenes	Men's cross-country	2:25:51	6

== Diving ==
Women

Athlete	Event	Preliminary		Semifinal		Final	
Athlete	Event	Points	Rank	Points	Rank	Points	Rank
Daphne Hernández	3 metre springboard	151.11	30	Did not advance			
Daphne Hernández	10 metre platform	217.77	26	Did not advance			

== Judo ==
Men

Athlete	Event	Round of 64	Round of 32	Round of 16	Quarterfinals	Semifinals	Repechage			Final	
Athlete	Event	Round of 64	Round of 32	Round of 16	Quarterfinals	Semifinals	Round 1	Round 2	Round 3	Final	
Athlete	Event	Opposition Result	Opposition Result	Opposition Result	Opposition Result	Opposition Result	Opposition Result	Opposition Result	Opposition Result	Opposition Result	Rank
Henry Núñez	–71 kg	Bye	Ghomi (IRI); L	Did not advance							
Ronny Gómez	–95 kg	Nazriev (TJK); L	Did not advance								

== Swimming ==
Men

Athlete	Event	Heats		Final A/B	
Athlete	Event	Time	Rank	Time	Rank
Juan José Madrigal	100 m breaststroke	1:05.47	34	Did not advance	

Women

Athlete	Event	Heats		Final A/B	
Athlete	Event	Time	Rank	Time	Rank
Melissa Mata	200 m butterfly	2:23.89	33	Did not advance	
Claudia Poll	200 m freestyle	1:59.87	2 FA	1:58.16	1st place, gold medalist(s)
Claudia Poll	400 m freestyle	4:12.07	6 FA	4:10.00	5

== See also ==
- Costa Rica at the 1995 Pan American Games
