= Costa Rica at the 1988 Summer Olympics =

- IOC code: CRC
- NOC: Comité Olímpico de Costa Rica

in Seoul
- Competitors: 16 in 6 sports
- Flag bearer: Sigrid Niehaus
- Medals Ranked 36th: Gold 0 Silver 1 Bronze 0 Total 1

Summer Olympics appearances (overview)
- 1936; 1948–1960; 1964; 1968; 1972; 1976; 1980; 1984; 1988; 1992; 1996; 2000; 2004; 2008; 2012; 2016; 2020; 2024

Costa Rica competed at the 1988 Summer Olympics in Seoul, South Korea. Silvia Poll won the nation's first Olympic medal, a silver.

== Medalists ==
Medal	Name	Sport	Event	Date
Silver	Silvia Poll	Swimming	Women's 200 metre freestyle	21 September

== Competitors ==
The following is the list of number of competitors in the Games.

Sport	Men	Women	Total
Athletics	3	1	4
Boxing	1	–	1
Judo	1	–	1
Shooting	1	0	1
Swimming	2	6	8
Weightlifting	1	–	1
Total	9	7	16

== Athletics ==
Men
Track and road events

Athlete	Event	Final	
Athlete	Event	Time	Rank
Juan Amores	Marathon	2:24:49	45
Ronald Lanzoni	Marathon	2:23:45	40
Luis López	Marathon	2:32:43	68

Women
Track and road events

Athlete	Event	Heat		Semifinal		Final	
Athlete	Event	Time	Rank	Time	Rank	Time	Rank
Maureen Stewart	800 metres	2:08.17	26	Did not advance			

== Boxing ==
Athlete	Event	Round of 64	Round of 32	Round of 16	Quarterfinals	Semifinals	Final	
Athlete	Event	Opposition Result	Opposition Result	Opposition Result	Opposition Result	Opposition Result	Opposition Result	Rank
Humberto Aranda	Welterweight	Bye	Naea (SAM); W RSC R2	Dydak (POL); L 1–4	Did not advance			

== Judo ==
Athlete	Event	Round of 64	Round of 32	Round of 16	Quarterfinals	Semifinals	Repechage			Final	
Athlete	Event	Round of 64	Round of 32	Round of 16	Quarterfinals	Semifinals	Round 1	Round 2	Round 3	Final	
Athlete	Event	Opposition Result	Opposition Result	Opposition Result	Opposition Result	Opposition Result	Opposition Result	Opposition Result	Opposition Result	Opposition Result	Rank
Henry Núñez	71 kg	Bye	Dahlin (SWE); L Koka	Did not advance							

== Shooting ==
Men

Athlete	Event	Qualification		Final	
Athlete	Event	Points	Rank	Points	Rank
Mariano Lara (Note: also competed at the 1984 Summer Olympics)	10 m air pistol	563	42	Did not advance	

== Swimming ==
Men

Athlete	Event	Heats		Final A/B	
Athlete	Event	Time	Rank	Time	Rank
Eric Greenwood	100 m backstroke	1:03.11	45	Did not advance	
Eric Greenwood	200 m backstroke	2:15.42	35	Did not advance	
Eric Greenwood	200 m individual medley	2:15.64	43	Did not advance	
Horst Niehaus	100 m backstroke	1:01.91	42	Did not advance	
Horst Niehaus	200 m backstroke	2:12.83	34	Did not advance	
Horst Niehaus	200 m individual medley	2:16.16	44	Did not advance	

Women

Athlete	Event	Heats		Final A/B	
Athlete	Event	Time	Rank	Time	Rank
Natasha Aguilar	200 m freestyle	2:10.22	34	Did not advance	
Marcela Cuesta	100 m butterfly	1:07.66	33	Did not advance	
Montserrat Hidalgo	100 m breaststroke	1:18.42	36	Did not advance	
Montserrat Hidalgo	200 m breaststroke	2:44.72	37	Did not advance	
Carolina Mauri	50 m freestyle	27.96	33	Did not advance	
Carolina Mauri	100 m freestyle	1:00.14	41	Did not advance	
Sigrid Niehaus	100 m breaststroke	1:16.65	35	Did not advance	
Sigrid Niehaus	200 m breaststroke	2:45.35	38	Did not advance	
Sylvia Poll	100 m freestyle	56.16	5 FA	55.90	5
Sylvia Poll	200 m freestyle	1:59.22	2 FA	1:58.67	2nd place, silver medalist(s)
Sylvia Poll	100 m backstroke	1:03.21	6 FA	1:03.34	6
Natasha Aguilar; Marcela Cuesta; Carolina Mauri; Sylvia Poll	4 × 100 m freestyle relay	3:59.67	12	Did not advance	
Sylvia Poll; Sigrid Niehaus; Marcela Cuesta; Carolina Mauri	4 × 100 m medley relay	4:31.75	15	Did not advance	

== Weightlifting ==
Athlete	Event	Snatch		Clean & jerk		Total	Rank
Athlete	Event	Result	Rank	Result	Rank	Total	Rank
Rafael Elizondo	82.5 kg	117.5	18	147.5	16	265.0	16
