= Costa Rica at the 2000 Summer Olympics =

- IOC code: CRC
- NOC: Comité Olímpico de Costa Rica
- Website: www.concrc.org (in Spanish)

in Sydney
- Competitors: 7 (5 men and 2 women) in 5 sports
- Flag bearer: Karina Fernández
- Medals Ranked 69th: Gold 0 Silver 0 Bronze 2 Total 2

Summer Olympics appearances (overview)
- 1936; 1948–1960; 1964; 1968; 1972; 1976; 1980; 1984; 1988; 1992; 1996; 2000; 2004; 2008; 2012; 2016; 2020; 2024

Costa Rica competed at the 2000 Summer Olympics in Sydney, Australia. The nation bagged two bronze medals at the 2000 Games.

Both medals were won in swimming by Claudia Poll. These medals doubled Costa Rica's overall Olympic medal haul to four. All four medals had been claimed in swimming. Previously, Claudia had won Costa Rica's first ever Olympic gold medal at the 1996 Games. Eight years earlier, Claudia's sister Silvia Poll won the silver medal in Women's 200 meter freestyle at the 1988 Summer Olympics in Seoul, South Korea. This was the first Olympic medal ever for a Costa Rican athlete.

== Medalists ==
Medal	Name	Sport	Event	Date
Bronze	Claudia Poll	Swimming	Women's 200 metre freestyle	19 September
Bronze	Claudia Poll	Swimming	Women's 400 metre freestyle	17 September

== Competitors ==
The following is the list of number of competitors in the Games.

Sport	Men	Women	Total
Athletics	1	0	1
Cycling	1	0	1
Swimming	2	1	3
Tennis	1	0	1
Triathlon	0	1	1
Total	5	2	7

== Results by event ==
=== Athletics ===
Men's Marathon

- José Luis Molina
  - Final – 2:20:37 (→ 39th place)

=== Cycling ===
==== Cross Country Mountain Bike ====
Men's Individual Competition

- José Adrián Bonilla
  - Final – 2:30:02.72 (→ 33rd place)

=== Swimming ===
Men's 50m Freestyle

- Estebán Blanco
  - Preliminary Heat – 23.72 (→ did not advance)

Men's 100m Breaststroke

- Juan José Madrigal
  - Preliminary Heat – 01:05.14 (→ did not advance)

Men's 200m Breaststroke

- Juan José Madrigal
  - Preliminary Heat – 02:24.49 (→ did not advance)

Women's 200m Freestyle

- Claudia Poll
  - Preliminary Heat – 02:00.11
  - Semi-final – 01:59.63
  - Final – 01:58.81 (→ Bronze Medal)

Women's 400m Freestyle

- Claudia Poll
  - Preliminary Heat – 04:09.33
  - Final – 04:07.83 (→ Bronze Medal)

Women's 800m Freestyle

- Claudia Poll
  - Preliminary Heat – DNS (→ did not advance)

=== Tennis ===
Men's singles

- Juan Antonio Marín

=== Triathlon ===
Women's Individual Competition:

- Karina Fernández – DNF

== See also ==
- Costa Rica at the 1999 Pan American Games
