= Costa Rica at the 2004 Summer Olympics =

- IOC code: CRC
- NOC: Comité Olímpico de Costa Rica
- Website: www.concrc.org (in Spanish)

in Athens
- Competitors: 20 in 6 sports
- Flag bearer: David Fernández
- Medals: Gold 0 Silver 0 Bronze 0 Total 0

Summer Olympics appearances (overview)
- 1936; 1948–1960; 1964; 1968; 1972; 1976; 1980; 1984; 1988; 1992; 1996; 2000; 2004; 2008; 2012; 2016; 2020; 2024

Costa Rica competed at the 2004 Summer Olympics in Athens, Greece, from 13 to 29 August 2004. Its contingent of 20 competitors in 6 sports did not win any medals.

== Cycling ==
=== Mountain biking ===
Athlete	Event	Time	Rank
José Adrián Bonilla	Men's cross-country	2:27:13	26
Karen Matamoros	Women's cross-country	LAP (1 lap)	23

== Football ==
=== Men's tournament ===
Roster

The following is the Costa Rican squad in the men's football tournament of the 2004 Summer Olympics.

Head coach: Rodrigo Kenton

No.	Pos.	Player	Date of birth (age)	Caps	Goals	2004 club
1	GK	Victor Bolivar	3 September 1983 (aged 20)	0	0	(Costa Rican Football Federation) Municipal Liberia
2	DF	Michael Rodriguez	30 December 1981 (aged 22)	0	1	(Costa Rican Football Federation) Alajuelense
3	DF	Pablo Salazar	21 November 1982 (aged 21)	0	2	(Costa Rican Football Federation) LD Alajuelense
4	DF	Michael Umaña	16 July 1982 (aged 22)	0	0	(Costa Rican Football Federation) Herediano
5	DF	Roy Myrie	21 August 1982 (aged 21)	0	3	(Costa Rican Football Federation) Alajuelense
6	FW	Whayne Wilson*	7 September 1975 (aged 28)	0	0	(Costa Rican Football Federation) Cartaginés
7	FW	Erick Scott	29 May 1981 (aged 23)	0	10	(United States Soccer Federation) Columbus Crew
8	MF	José Luis López	31 March 1981 (aged 23)	0	2	(Costa Rican Football Federation) Herediano
9	MF	Pablo Brenes	4 August 1982 (aged 22)	0	1	(United States Soccer Federation) MetroStars
10	MF	Warren Granados	6 December 1981 (aged 22)	0	3	(Costa Rican Football Federation) Alajuelense
11	FW	Álvaro Saborío	25 March 1982 (aged 22)	0	11	(Costa Rican Football Federation) Deportivo Saprissa
12	MF	Leonardo Araya	15 February 1982 (aged 22)	0	1	(Costa Rican Football Federation) Santos de Guápiles
13	DF	Daniel Vallejos	27 May 1981 (aged 23)	0	0	(Costa Rican Football Federation) Herediano
14	DF	José Villalobos	5 June 1981 (aged 23)	0	0	(Costa Rican Football Federation) Cartaginés
15	DF	Júnior Díaz	12 September 1983 (aged 20)	0	4	(Costa Rican Football Federation) Herediano
16	MF	Carlos Hernández	9 April 1982 (aged 22)	0	0	(Costa Rican Football Federation) Alajuelense
17	FW	Jairo Arrieta	25 August 1983 (aged 20)	0	0	(Costa Rican Football Federation) Brujas
18	GK	Neighel Drummond	2 February 1982 (aged 22)	0	0	(Costa Rican Football Federation) Alajuelense

* Over-aged player.

Group play

Pos	Team	Pld	W	D	L	GF	GA	GD	Pts	Qualification
1	Iraq	3	2	0	1	7	4	+3	6	Qualified for the quarterfinals
2	Costa Rica	3	1	1	1	4	4	0	4	Qualified for the quarterfinals
3	Morocco	3	1	1	1	3	3	0	4	
4	Portugal	3	1	0	2	6	9	−3	3	

12 August 2004
20:30

Costa Rica	0 – 0	Morocco
	Report

Pankritio Stadium, Heraklion
Attendance: 3,212
Referee: Massimo De Santis (Italy)

15 August 2004
20:30

Costa Rica	0 – 2	Iraq
	Report	H. Mohammed 67'; Karim 72'

Karaiskaki Stadium, Piraeus
Attendance: 12,150
Referee: Charles Ariiotima (Tahiti)

18 August 2004
20:30

Costa Rica	4 – 2	Portugal
Villalobos 50'; Meira 68' (o.g.); Saborio 71'; Brenes 90+1'	Report	Almeida 29'; Ribeiro 54'

Pankritio Stadium, Heraklion
Attendance: 11,218
Referee: Carlos Torres (Paraguay)

Quarterfinal

21 August 2004
21:00

Argentina	4 – 0	Costa Rica
Delgado 24'; Tevez 43', 82', 83'	Report

Pampeloponnisiako Stadium, Patras
Attendance: 9,929
Referee: Kyros Vassaras (Greece)

== Judo ==
Athlete	Event	Round of 32	Round of 16	Quarterfinals	Semifinals	Repechage 1	Repechage 2	Repechage 3	Final / BM	
Athlete	Event	Opposition Result	Opposition Result	Opposition Result	Opposition Result	Opposition Result	Opposition Result	Opposition Result	Opposition Result	Rank
David Fernández	Men's −60 kg	Aburto (MEX); L 0000–0002	Did not advance							

== Shooting ==
Women

Athlete	Event	Qualification		Final	
Athlete	Event	Points	Rank	Points	Rank
Grettel Barboza	10 m air pistol	368	=35	Did not advance	

== Swimming ==
Women

Athlete	Event	Heat		Semifinal		Final	
Athlete	Event	Result	Rank	Result	Rank	Result	Rank
Claudia Poll	200 m freestyle	1:59.50	2 Q	1:59.79	10	Did not advance	
Claudia Poll	400 m freestyle	4:09.75	9	—		Did not advance	

== Taekwondo ==
Athlete	Event	Round of 16	Quarterfinals	Semifinals	Repechage 1	Repechage 2	Final / BM	
Athlete	Event	Opposition Result	Opposition Result	Opposition Result	Opposition Result	Opposition Result	Opposition Result	Rank
Kristopher Moitland	Men's +80 kg	Sanon (HAI); W 3–2	Gentil (FRA); L (−1)–4	Did not advance				

== See also ==
- Costa Rica at the 2003 Pan American Games
- Costa Rica at the 2004 Summer Paralympics
