= Petr Hladík =

Petr Hladík may refer to:

- Petr Hladík (cyclist)
- Petr Hladík (diplomat)
- Petr Hladík (politician)
