= Costa Rica at the 1992 Winter Olympics =

- IOC code: CRC
- NOC: Comité Olímpico de Costa Rica
- Website: www.concrc.org (in Spanish)

in Albertville
- Competitors: 4 (men) in 1 sport
- Medals: Gold 0 Silver 0 Bronze 0 Total 0

Winter Olympics appearances (overview)
- 1980; 1984; 1988; 1992; 1994–1998; 2002; 2006; 2010–2022; 2026; 2030

Costa Rica competed at the 1992 Winter Olympics in Albertville, France.

== Competitors ==
The following is the list of number of competitors in the Games.

Sport	Men	Women	Total
Alpine skiing	4	0	4
Total	4	0	4

== Alpine skiing ==
Men

Athlete	Event	Race 1	Race 2	Total	
Athlete	Event	Time	Time	Time	Rank
Martin Chernacov	Giant Slalom	DNF	–	DNF	–
Gabriel Chernacov	Giant Slalom	2:11.34	DNF	DNF	–
Alejandro Preinfalk	Giant Slalom	2:04.91	2:44.15	4:49.06	91
Julián Muñoz	Giant Slalom	1:47.78	1:58.73	3:46.51	90
Alejandro Preinfalk	Slalom	2:09.83	2:19.30	4:29.13	65
Julián Muñoz	Slalom	1:53.09	1:51.02	3:44.11	64
