= Costa Rica at the 2012 Summer Olympics =

- IOC code: CRC
- NOC: Comité Olímpico de Costa Rica
- Website: www.concrc.org (in Spanish)

in London
- Competitors: 11 in 6 sports
- Flag bearer: Gabriela Traña
- Medals: Gold 0 Silver 0 Bronze 0 Total 0

Summer Olympics appearances (overview)
- 1936; 1948–1960; 1964; 1968; 1972; 1976; 1980; 1984; 1988; 1992; 1996; 2000; 2004; 2008; 2012; 2016; 2020; 2024

Costa Rica competed at the 2012 Summer Olympics in London from 27 July to 12 August 2012. This was the nation's fourteenth appearance at the Olympics, having skipped four editions of the Summer Games since the nation's Olympic debut in 1936.

Comité Olímpico de Costa Rica sent a total of 11 athletes to the Games, 8 men and 3 women, to compete in 6 sports. Three of its athletes made their second consecutive Olympic appearance, including marathon runner Gabriela Traña, who was also the nation's flag bearer at the opening ceremony. Costa Rica, however, failed to win any medal for the third consecutive Olympics.

== Athletics ==
Costa Rican athletes have so far achieved qualifying standards in the following athletics events (up to a maximum of 3 athletes in each event at the 'A' Standard, and 1 at the 'B' Standard):

Key

- Note – Ranks given for track events are within the athlete's heat only
- Q = Qualified for the next round
- q = Qualified for the next round as a fastest loser or, in field events, by position without achieving the qualifying target
- NR = National record
- N/A = Round not applicable for the event
- Bye = Athlete not required to compete in round

Men

Athlete	Event	Heat		Semifinal		Final	
Athlete	Event	Result	Rank	Result	Rank	Result	Rank
Nery Brenes	400 m	45.65	4	Did not advance			
César Lizano	Marathon	—				2:24:16	65

Women

Athlete	Event	Heat		Semifinal		Final	
Athlete	Event	Result	Rank	Result	Rank	Result	Rank
Sharolyn Scott	400 m hurdles	57.03	6	Did not advance			
Gabriela Traña	Marathon	—				2:43:17	91

== Cycling ==
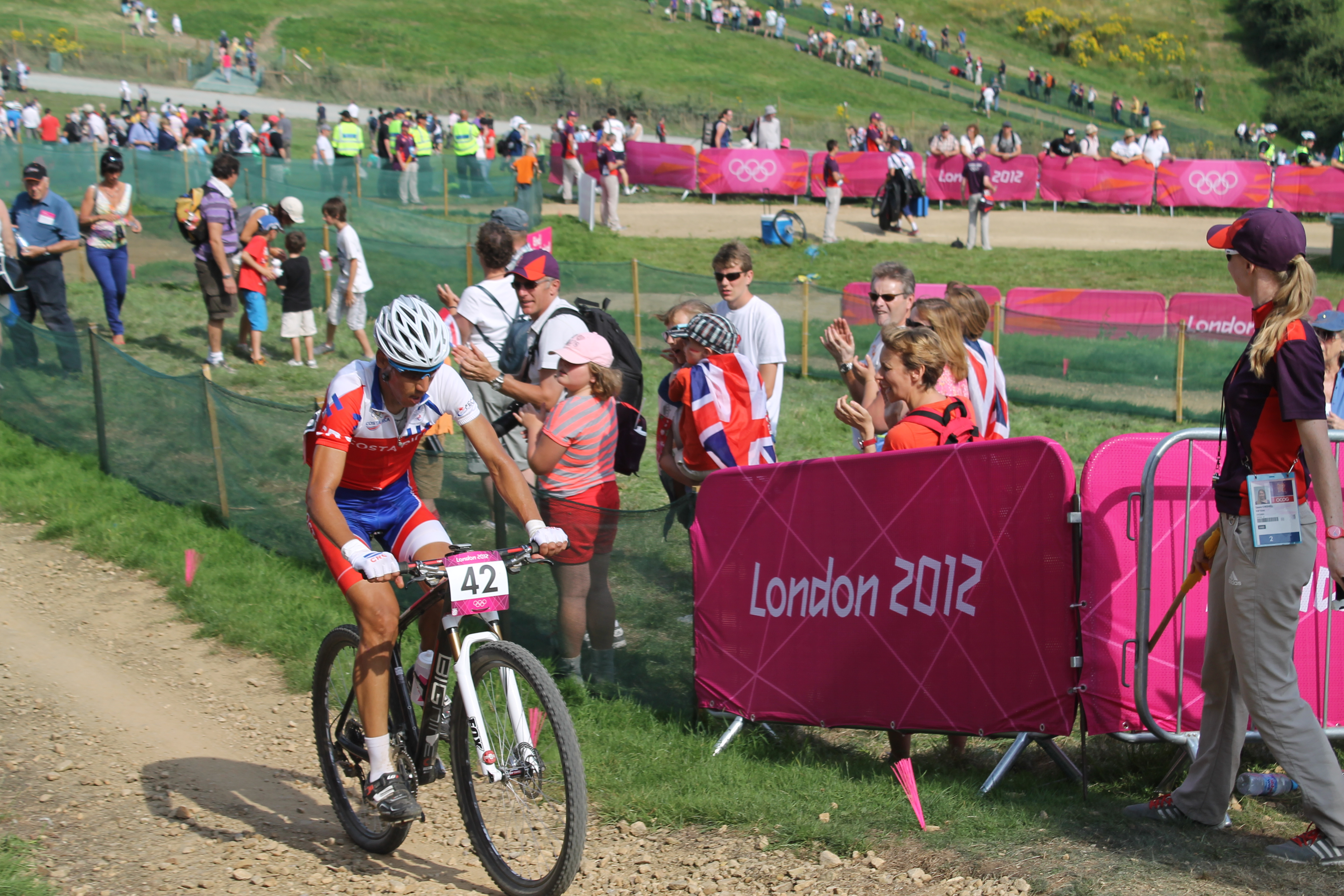
Paolo Montoya in men's cross-country race

=== Road ===
Athlete	Event	Time	Rank
Andrey Amador	Men's road race	5:46:37	35

=== Mountain biking ===
Athlete	Event	Time	Rank
Paolo Montoya	Men's cross-country	1:41:19	36

== Judo ==
Athlete	Event	Round of 64	Round of 32	Round of 16	Quarterfinals	Semifinals	Repechage	Final / BM	
Athlete	Event	Opposition Result	Opposition Result	Opposition Result	Opposition Result	Opposition Result	Opposition Result	Opposition Result	Rank
Osman Murillo	Men's −73 kg	Bye	Hafiz (EGY); L 0003–0020	Did not advance					

== Swimming ==
Men

Athlete	Event	Heat		Semifinal		Final	
Athlete	Event	Time	Rank	Time	Rank	Time	Rank
Mario Montoya	200 m freestyle	1:51.66	33	Did not advance			

Women

Athlete	Event	Heat		Semifinal		Final	
Athlete	Event	Time	Rank	Time	Rank	Time	Rank
Marie Laura Meza	100 m butterfly	1:07.01	42	Did not advance			

== Taekwondo ==
Costa Rica qualified one man.

Athlete	Event	Round of 16	Quarterfinals	Semifinals	Repechage	Bronze Medal	Final	
Athlete	Event	Opposition Result	Opposition Result	Opposition Result	Opposition Result	Opposition Result	Opposition Result	Rank
Heiner Oviedo	Men's −58 kg	Denisenko (RUS); L 2–5	Did not advance					

== Triathlon ==
Costa Rica qualified the following athletes.

Athlete	Event	Swim (1.5 km)	Trans 1	Bike (40 km)	Trans 2	Run (10 km)	Total Time	Rank
Leonardo Chacón	Men's	17:24	0:42	1:00:19	0:32	33:42	1:52:39	48
