= Stoute =

Stoute may refer to:

- Jennifer Stoute (born 1965), English sprinter
- Kevin Stoute (born 1985), Barbadian cricketer
- Michael Stoute (born 1945), Barbadian racehorse trainer
- Michael Stoute (cyclist) (born 1948), Barbadian cyclist
- René Stoute (1950–2000), Dutch writer and poet
