= Costa Rica at the 1936 Summer Olympics =

- IOC code: CRC
- NOC: Comité Olímpico de Costa Rica

in Berlin
- Competitors: 1 in 1 sport
- Flag bearer: Bernardo de la Guardia
- Medals: Gold 0 Silver 0 Bronze 0 Total 0

Summer Olympics appearances (overview)
- 1936; 1948–1960; 1964; 1968; 1972; 1976; 1980; 1984; 1988; 1992; 1996; 2000; 2004; 2008; 2012; 2016; 2020; 2024

Costa Rica competed in the Summer Olympic Games for the first time at the 1936 Summer Olympics in Berlin, Germany. A single competitor, Bernardo de la Guardia, took part in the individual sabre event. As the sole Costa Rican athlete at the Games, he was also the flag bearer for Costa Rica.

== Fencing ==
One fencer represented Costa Rica in 1936.

Men's sabre

- Bernardo de la Guardia
