= Preinfalk =

Surname

Preinfalk is a surname. Notable people with the surname include:

- Alejandro Preinfalk (born 1970), Costa Rican alpine skier
- Alexander Preinfalk (1920–1944), German World War II flying ace
- Gerald Preinfalk (born 1971), Austrian jazz and classical saxophonist and clarinetist
