= Costa Rica at the 1988 Winter Olympics =

- IOC code: CRC
- NOC: Comité Olímpico de Costa Rica
- Website: www.concrc.org (in Spanish)

in Calgary
- Competitors: 2 (men) in 2 sports
- Flag bearer: Arturo Kinch
- Medals: Gold 0 Silver 0 Bronze 0 Total 0

Winter Olympics appearances (overview)
- 1980; 1984; 1988; 1992; 1994–1998; 2002; 2006; 2010–2026

Costa Rica competed at the 1988 Winter Olympics in Calgary, Canada.

== Competitors ==
The following is the list of number of competitors in the Games.

Sport	Men	Women	Total
Alpine skiing	2	0	2
Cross-country skiing	1	0	1
Total	2	0	2

== Alpine skiing ==
Men

Athlete	Event	Race 1	Race 2	Total	
Athlete	Event	Time	Time	Time	Rank
Julián Muñoz	Giant Slalom	1:38.71	1:41.88	3:20.59	68
Arturo Kinch	Giant Slalom	1:26.71	1:23.12	2:49.83	62
Julián Muñoz	Slalom	1:30.10	1:26.62	2:56.72	51

== Cross-country skiing ==
Men

Event	Athlete	Race	
Event	Athlete	Time	Rank
15 km C	Arturo Kinch	59:37.9	82
30 km C	Arturo Kinch	2'16:20.2	87

C = Classical style, F = Freestyle
