= Costa Rica at the 1980 Winter Olympics =

- IOC code: CRC
- NOC: Comité Olímpico de Costa Rica
- Website: www.concrc.org (in Spanish)

in Lake Placid
- Competitors: 1 (man) in 1 sport
- Flag bearer: Arturo Kinch
- Medals: Gold 0 Silver 0 Bronze 0 Total 0

Winter Olympics appearances (overview)
- 1980; 1984; 1988; 1992; 1994–1998; 2002; 2006; 2010–2026

Costa Rica sent a delegation to compete at the 1980 Winter Olympics in Lake Placid, United States from 13–24 February 1980. This was Costa Rica's first appearance at a Winter Olympic Games, after five prior appearances at Summer Olympics. The only athlete sent by the country was alpine skier Arturo Kinch. In the only event he finished, the men's downhill, he came 41st.

== Background ==
The Comité Olímpico Nacional de Costa Rica was recognized by the International Olympic Committee on 31 December 1935, and Costa Rica first joined Olympic competition at the 1936 Summer Olympics. After that, the nation did not return to Summer Olympic competition until the 1964 Summer Olympics, and have competed in every Summer Olympics since. These Lake Placid Olympics were Costa Rica's first appearance at a Winter Olympic Games. The 1980 Winter Olympics were held from 13–24 February 1980; a total of 1,072 athletes participated, representing 37 National Olympic Committees. Arturo Kinch was the only athlete selected by Costa Rica for these Olympics. He was selected as the flag bearer for the opening ceremony.

== Alpine skiing ==
Arturo Kinch was 23 years old at the time of the Lake Placid Olympics. In his youth Kinch was a soccer player, who moved to Colorado for college. After using skiing as a way to keep fit between soccer seasons, he decided to file paperwork to create a Costa Rican ski federation, a process that took two years. On 14 February, he took part in the downhill, and finished the race in 2 minutes and 12.24 seconds. This was good for 41st place, his best finish in a career that would eventually span five Olympics. In the downhill, the gold medal was won by Leonhard Stock of Austria, the silver was taken by his compatriot Peter Wirnsberger, and the bronze was won by Canadian Steve Podborski. On 18 February, Kinch participated in the giant slalom, but failed to finish the first run. Kinch also took part in the slalom held on 22 February, but he again failed to complete the first run.

Athlete	Event	Race 1		Race 2		Total	
Athlete	Event	Time	Rank	Time	Rank	Time	Rank
Arturo Kinch	Downhill					2:12.24	41
Arturo Kinch	Giant slalom	DNF	–	–	–	DNF	–
Arturo Kinch	Slalom	DNF	–	–	–	DNF	–

== See also ==
- Costa Rica at the 1980 Summer Olympics
