= Cycling at the 1968 Summer Olympics – Men's individual road race =

Men's cycling road race at the Games of the XIX Olympiad
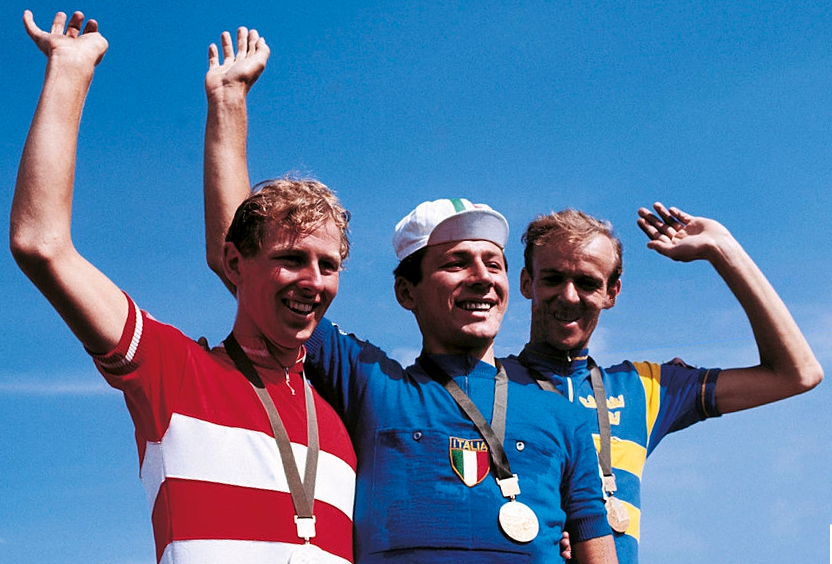
- The medalists: Leif Mortensen, Pierfranco Vianelli, and Gösta Pettersson
- Venue: Mexico City, Mexico
- Date: 23 October 1968
- Competitors: 144 from 44 nations
- Winning time: 4:41:25

Medalists
1st place, gold medalist(s)		Pierfranco Vianelli; Italy
2nd place, silver medalist(s)		Leif Mortensen; Denmark
3rd place, bronze medalist(s)		Gösta Pettersson; Sweden

The men's individual road race was a road bicycle racing event held as part of the Cycling at the 1968 Summer Olympics programme. 144 cyclists from 44 nations took part. The maximum number of cyclists per nation was four. It was held on 23 October 1968. The course, just short of 25 kilometres, was covered 8 times for a total distance of 196.2 kilometres. The event was won by Pierfranco Vianelli of Italy, the nation's second consecutive victory in the men's individual road race (putting Italy over France in most gold medals, three to two). It was the fourth consecutive Games that an Italian cyclist finished first or second. Leif Mortensen's silver was Denmark's second consecutive silver medal in the event. Gösta Pettersson earned Sweden's first medal in the event with his bronze.

== Background ==
This was the eighth appearance of the event, previously held in 1896 and then at every Summer Olympics since 1936. It replaced the individual time trial event that had been held from 1912 to 1932 (and which would be reintroduced alongside the road race in 1996). There "was no heavy favorite as the last three World Championships had seen nine different riders on the podium."

Barbados, Costa Rica, Cuba, the Democratic Republic of the Congo, Ecuador, El Salvador, Guatemala, Lebanon, and Madagascar each made their debut in the men's individual road race; West Germany competed separately for the first time. Great Britain made its eighth appearance in the event, the only nation to have competed in each appearance to date.

== Competition format and course ==
The mass-start race was on a course that covered eight laps of a 24.525 kilometres circuit, for a total of 196.2 kilometres. It was a "quite hilly" course.

== Schedule ==
All times are Central Standard Time (UTC-6)

Date	Time	Round
Wednesday, 23 October 1968	9:00	Final

== Results ==
Rank	Cyclist	Nation	Time
1st place, gold medalist(s)	Pierfranco Vianelli	Italy	4:41:25
2nd place, silver medalist(s)	Leif Mortensen	Denmark	4:42:49
3rd place, bronze medalist(s)	Gösta Pettersson	Sweden	4:43:15
4	Stéphan Abrahamian	France	4:43:36
5	René Pijnen	Netherlands	4:43:36
6	Jean-Pierre Monseré	Belgium	4:43:51
7	Tomas Pettersson	Sweden	4:43:58
8	Giovanni Bramucci	Italy	4:43:58
9	Martín Rodríguez	Colombia	4:43:58
10	Marian Kegel	Poland	4:44:00
11	Jan Krekels	Netherlands	4:44:09
12	Burkhard Ebert	West Germany	4:44:10
13	Thorleif Andresen	Norway	4:44:10
14	Tore Milsett	Norway	4:44:12
15	Álvaro Pachón	Colombia	4:44:13
16	José Gómez	Spain	4:44:13
17	Valery Yardy	Soviet Union	4:44:15
18	Roger De Vlaeminck	Belgium	4:44:24
19	André Dierickx	Belgium	4:45:32
20	Alain Vasseur	France	4:45:36
21	Imre Géra	Hungary	4:45:57
22	Saturnino Rustrián	Guatemala	4:46:13
23	Jan Smolík	Czechoslovakia	4:46:30
24	Harrie Jansen	Netherlands	4:46:30
25	Cvitko Bilić	Yugoslavia	4:46:31
26	Ole Højlund Pedersen	Denmark	4:46:31
27	Agustín Juárez	Mexico	4:46:32
28	Luis Zubero	Spain	4:46:34
29	Jørgen Emil Hansen	Denmark	4:46:34
30	Pedro Sánchez	Colombia	4:46:37
31	Flavio Martini	Italy	4:47:56
32	Yury Dmitriyev	Soviet Union	4:47:57
33	Daniel Ducreux	France	4:47:57
34	Dave Rollinson	Great Britain	4:47:58
35	Erik Pettersson	Sweden	4:47:58
36	Heriberto Díaz	Mexico	4:47:59
37	Raimo Honkanen	Finland	4:47:59
38	Svend Erik Bjerg	Denmark	4:48:03
39	Rudi Valenčič	Yugoslavia	4:48:03
40	Roberto Breppe	Argentina	4:48:07
41	Ferenc Keserű	Hungary	4:50:30
42	Miguel Lasa	Spain	4:51:05
43	Jesús Sarabia	Mexico	4:51:05
44	John Howard	United States	4:52:45
45	Jürgen Tschan	West Germany	4:52:50
46	Mauno Uusivirta	Finland	4:52:50
47	Jan Erik Gustavsen	Norway	4:54:41
48	Evaristo Oliva	Guatemala	4:57:07
49	Jorge Inés	Guatemala	4:57:07
50	Brian Jolly	Great Britain	4:57:42
51	Curt Söderlund	Sweden	5:01:12
52	Des Thomson	New Zealand	5:02:33
53	Tekeste Woldu	Ethiopia	5:05:12
54	Roger Gilson	Luxembourg	5:05:12
55	Marcel Roy	Canada	5:05:13
56	Ørnulf Andresen	Norway	5:05:17
57	Ole Wackström	Finland	5:05:18
58	András Takács	Hungary	5:05:21
59	Kazimierz Jasiński	Poland	5:08:25
60	Gerard Lettoli	San Marino	5:10:22
61	Enzo Frisoni	San Marino	5:12:46
62	Zygmunt Hanusik	Poland	5:20:59
63	Miguel Ángel Sánchez	Costa Rica	5:20:59
64	Joe Jones	Canada	5:30:13
—	Juan Alves	Argentina	DNF
—	Héctor Cassina	Argentina	DNF
—	Gerardo Cavallieri	Argentina	DNF
—	Ronald Jonker	Australia	DNF
—	Peter McDermott	Australia	DNF
—	Kevin Morgan	Australia	DNF
—	Donald Wilson	Australia	DNF
—	Colin Forde	Barbados	DNF
—	Kensley Reece	Barbados	DNF
—	Richard Roett	Barbados	DNF
—	Michael Stoute	Barbados	DNF
—	Jozef Schoeters	Belgium	DNF
—	Jules Béland	Canada	DNF
—	Yves Landry	Canada	DNF
—	Jean Barnabé	Congo-Kinshasa	DNF
—	Constantin Kabemba	Congo-Kinshasa	DNF
—	Samuel Kibamba	Congo-Kinshasa	DNF
—	Ignace Mandjambi	Congo-Kinshasa	DNF
—	Miguel Samacá	Colombia	DNF
—	José Sánchez	Costa Rica	DNF
—	Humberto Solano	Costa Rica	DNF
—	José Manuel Soto	Costa Rica	DNF
—	Sergio Martínez	Cuba	DNF
—	Roberto Menéndez	Cuba	DNF
—	Ulises Váldez	Cuba	DNF
—	Raúl Marcelo Vázquez	Cuba	DNF
—	Noé Medina	Ecuador	DNF
—	Victor Morales	Ecuador	DNF
—	Arnulfo Pozo	Ecuador	DNF
—	Hipólito Pozo	Ecuador	DNF
—	Mauricio Bolaños	El Salvador	DNF
—	Francisco Funes	El Salvador	DNF
—	David Miranda	El Salvador	DNF
—	Juan Molina	El Salvador	DNF
—	Agustín Tamames	Spain	DNF
—	Yemane Negassi	Ethiopia	DNF
—	Mehari Okubamicael	Ethiopia	DNF
—	Mikael Saglimbeni	Ethiopia	DNF
—	Raimo Suikkanen	Finland	DNF
—	Jean-Pierre Paranteau	France	DNF
—	Ortwin Czarnowski	West Germany	DNF
—	Dieter Koslar	West Germany	DNF
—	Billy Bilsland	Great Britain	DNF
—	Les West	Great Britain	DNF
—	Francisco Cuque	Guatemala	DNF
—	Tibor Magyar	Hungary	DNF
—	Peter Doyle	Ireland	DNF
—	Morris Foster	Ireland	DNF
—	Liam Horner	Ireland	DNF
—	George Tajirian	Iraq	DNF
—	Tino Conti	Italy	DNF
—	Gwon Jung-hyeon	South Korea	DNF
—	Tarek Abou Al Dahab	Lebanon	DNF
—	Solo Razafinarivo	Madagascar	DNF
—	Ng Joo Pong	Malaysia	DNF
—	Johari Ramli	Malaysia	DNF
—	Gabriel Cuéllar	Mexico	DNF
—	Joop Zoetemelk	Netherlands	DNF
—	Bryce Beeston	New Zealand	DNF
—	John Dean	New Zealand	DNF
—	Richie Thomson	New Zealand	DNF
—	Zenon Czechowski	Poland	DNF
—	Emil Rusu	Romania	DNF
—	Bruno Hubschmid	Switzerland	DNF
—	Petr Hladík	Czechoslovakia	DNF
—	Somchai Chantarasamrit	Thailand	DNF
—	Suriyong Hemint	Thailand	DNF
—	Somkuan Seehapant	Thailand	DNF
—	Chainarong Sophonpong	Thailand	DNF
—	Deng Chueng-hwai	Taiwan	DNF
—	Liu Cheng-tao	Taiwan	DNF
—	Shue Ming-shu	Taiwan	DNF
—	Vladislav Nelyubin	Soviet Union	DNF
—	Anatoliy Starkov	Soviet Union	DNF
—	Daniel Butler	United States	DNF
—	David Chauner	United States	DNF
—	Wes Wessberg	United States	DNF
—	Bùi Văn Hoàng	Vietnam	DNF
—	Trương Kim Hùng	Vietnam	DNF
—	Tanasije Kuvalja	Yugoslavia	DNF
