= Julio Morales =

Julio Morales may refer to:

- Julio César Morales (born 1993), Mexican-American soccer player
- Julio Morales (Costa Rican footballer) (born 1957), Costa Rican footballer
- Julio Morales (Uruguayan footballer) (1945–2022), Uruguayan footballer
