= Frisoni =

Frisoni is an Italian surname. Notable people with the surname include:

- Donato Giuseppe Frisoni (1683–1785), Italian architect
- Elisa Frisoni (born 1985), Italian cyclist
- Enzo Frisoni (born 1947), Sammarinese cyclist
- Evaristo Frisoni (1907–?), Italian footballer
- Guido Frisoni (born 1970), Sammarinese cyclist
- Luigi Frisoni (1760–1811), Italian painter
