= Costa Rica at the 2002 Winter Olympics =

- IOC code: CRC
- NOC: Olympic Committee of Costa Rica
- Website: www.concrc.org (in Spanish)

in Salt Lake City, Utah
- Competitors: 1 man in 1 sport
- Flag bearer: N/A (did not participate in Parade of Nations)
- Medals: Gold 0 Silver 0 Bronze 0 Total 0

Winter Olympics appearances (overview)
- 1980; 1984; 1988; 1992; 1994–1998; 2002; 2006; 2010–2026

Costa Rica was represented at the 2002 Winter Olympics in Salt Lake City, Utah, United States by the Olympic Committee of Costa Rica.

In total, one athlete – Arturo Kinch – represented Costa Rica in cross-country skiing. He contested two events and recorded his best finish (67th) in the men's sprint.

== Background ==
Costa Rica had become regular competitors at the Winter Olympics following their debut at the 1980 Winter Olympics in Lake Placid, New York, United States. However, they missed the 1994 Winter Olympics in Lillehammer, Norway and the 1998 Winter Olympics in Nagano, Japan. The 2002 Winter Olympics would be their fifth appearance at a Winter Olympics.

Costa Rica did not have a flag bearer at the 2002 Winter Olympics as they did not take part in the opening ceremony.

== Competitors ==
In total, one athlete represented Costa Rica at the 2002 Winter Olympics in Salt Lake City, Utah, United States across one sport.

Sport	Men	Women	Total
Cross-country skiing	1	0	0
Total	1	0	1

== Cross-country skiing ==
In total, one Costa Rican athlete participated in the cross-country skiing events – Arturo Kinch in the men's sprint and the men's 2 x 10 km pursuit.

The cross-country skiing events took place at Soldier Hollow in Wasatch Mountain State Park, Utah, United States from 9 to 23 February 2002.

The men's sprint took place on 19 February 2002. Kinch completed the qualifying round in four minutes 22.72 seconds. He did not advance to the quarter-finals and finished 67th overall.

Athlete	Qualifying round		Quarter finals		Semi finals		Finals	
Athlete	Time	Rank	Time	Rank	Time	Rank	Time	Final rank
Arturo Kinch	4:22.72	67	did not advance					

The men's 2 x 10 km pursuit took place on 14 February 2002. Kinch completed the 10 km classical in a time of 41 minutes 30.5 seconds. He did not advance to the 10 km freestyle and finished 78th overall.

Athlete	10 km C		10 km F pursuit^{1}	
Athlete	Time	Rank	Time	Final rank
Arturo Kinch	41:30.5	78	did not advance	

^{1} Starting delay based on 10 km C. results.
C = Classical style, F = Freestyle
