= Dennis Marshall =

Dennis Marshall may refer to:

- Dennis Marshall (footballer, born 1959), Costa Rican football midfielder
- Dennis Marshall (footballer, born 1985) (1985–2011), his son, Costa Rican football defender

== See also ==
- Denis Marshall (disambiguation)
- Dennis Marschall (born 1996), German racing driver
