= Costa Rica at the 1972 Summer Olympics =

- IOC code: CRC
- NOC: Comité Olímpico de Costa Rica

in Munich
- Competitors: 3 in 3 sports
- Flag bearer: Hugo Chamberlain
- Medals: Gold 0 Silver 0 Bronze 0 Total 0

Summer Olympics appearances (overview)
- 1936; 1948–1960; 1964; 1968; 1972; 1976; 1980; 1984; 1988; 1992; 1996; 2000; 2004; 2008; 2012; 2016; 2020; 2024

Costa Rica competed at the 1972 Summer Olympics in Munich, West Germany. Three competitors, all men, took part in four events in three sports. The Costa Rican contingent did not win any medals.

== Athletics ==
Men's 10,000 metres

- Rafael Ángel Pérez
  - Round 1 – 29:36.6 min (→ 13th in heat, did not advance)

== Judo ==
Men's Half-Heavyweight

- Roberto Solorzano

== Shooting ==
One shooter represented Costa Rica in 1972.

50 m rifle, three positions

- Hugo Chamberlain

50 m rifle, prone

- Hugo Chamberlain
