= Costa Rica at the 1984 Winter Olympics =

- IOC code: CRC
- NOC: Comité Olímpico de Costa Rica
- Website: www.concrc.org (in Spanish)

in Sarajevo
- Competitors: 3 (men) in 3 sports
- Medals: Gold 0 Silver 0 Bronze 0 Total 0

Winter Olympics appearances (overview)
- 1980; 1984; 1988; 1992; 1994–1998; 2002; 2006; 2010–2022; 2026; 2030

Costa Rica competed at the 1984 Winter Olympics in Sarajevo, Yugoslavia.

== Alpine skiing ==
Men

Athlete	Event	Race 1		Race 2		Total	
Athlete	Event	Time	Rank	Time	Rank	Time	Rank
Arturo Kinch	Giant Slalom	1:57.84	79	1:53.27	62	3:51.11	67
Eduardo Kopper	Giant Slalom	1:49.35	70	1:57.23	66	3:46.58	65
Eduardo Kopper	Slalom	1:24.39	63	1:18.94	44	2:43.33	45

== Biathlon ==
Men

Event	Athlete	Misses ^{1}	Time	Rank
10 km Sprint	Hernán Carazo	DNF	DNF	–

Event	Athlete	Time	Penalties	Adjusted time ^{2}	Rank
20 km	Hernán Carazo	2'13:54.9	11	2'24:54.9	61

^{1} A penalty loop of 150 metres had to be skied per missed target.
^{2} One minute added per missed target.

== Cross-country skiing ==
Men

Event	Athlete	Race	
Event	Athlete	Time	Rank
15 km	Arturo Kinch	58:42.9	79
30 km	Arturo Kinch	DSQ	–
