= Agustín Juárez (cyclist) =

Mexican cyclist

Personal information
- Born: 28 August 1943 San Luis Potosí City, Mexico
- Died: 7 May 2024 (aged 80)

Cycling career
- Sport: Cycling

Agustín Juárez (28 August 1943 – 7 May 2024) was a Mexican cyclist. He competed in the individual road race at the 1968 Summer Olympics.
