= Fábio Igel =

Brazilian alpine skier (born 1970)

Personal information
- Nationality: Brazilian
- Born: 14 August 1970 (age 54)

Sport
- Sport: Alpine skiing

Fábio Igel (born 14 August 1970) is a Brazilian alpine skier. He competed in the men's giant slalom at the 1992 Winter Olympics.
