= Ricardo García (footballer) =

Costa Rican footballer (1955-2007)

Personal information
- Full name: Ricardo Antonio García Rodríguez
- Date of birth: 31 July 1955
- Place of birth: Puntarenas, Costa Rica
- Date of death: 12 December 2007 (aged 52)
- Place of death: Puntarenas, Costa Rica
- Position: Defender

Senior career*
Years	Team	Apps	(Gls)
1976–1989	Municipal Puntarenas		(12)

International career
	Costa Rica	17	
- * Club domestic league appearances and goals

Ricardo Antonio García Rodríguez, also known as Sardina (31 July 1955 – 12 December 2007), was a Costa Rican professional footballer who played his entire career for Municipal Puntarenas.

== Club career ==
García won the 1986 Primera Division de Costa Rica title alongside players like Leonidas Flores and Luis Galagarza with hometown club Puntarenas. He alo won the second division title with them in 1976 and retired in 1989.

== International career ==
He also made 17 appearances for the full Costa Rica national football team. He also played at the 1980 Olympic Games.

== Personal life and death ==
García's son, also named Ricardo (Garciá Carvajal), is a professional footballer who plays for Puntarenas

García committed suicide in the El Roble district of Puntarenas on 12 December 2007.
