= Denis Marshall =

Denis Marshall may refer to:

- Denis Marshall (footballer) (born 1940), Australian rules footballer
- Denis Marshall (politician) (born 1943), New Zealand politician

== See also ==
- Dennis Marshall (disambiguation)
- Dennis Marschall (born 1996), German racing driver
