= Somkuan Seehapant =

Thai cyclist

Personal information
- Born: 10 February 1946 (age 80) Bangkok, Thailand

Cycling career
- Sport: Cycling

Somkuan Seehapant (born 10 February 1946) is a former Thai cyclist. He competed in the individual road race at the 1968 Summer Olympics.
