= Wes Wessberg =

American cyclist (1939–2024)

Wesley Wessberg
Personal information
- Born: June 27, 1939 Washington, D.C., United States
- Died: November 13, 2024 (aged 85)

Cycling career
- Sport: Cycling

Wesley "Wes" Wessberg (June 27, 1939 – November 13, 2024) was an American cyclist. He competed in the individual road race at the 1968 Summer Olympics. After high school, Wessberg joined the Air Force. He later graduated from Cal State Northridge with a degree in physics.
