= Claudia Poll =

Costa Rican swimmer (born 1972)

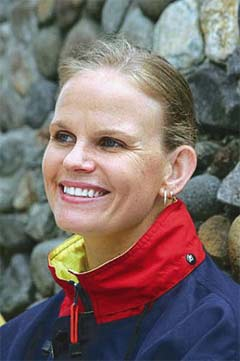
- Poll in 2011

Personal information
- Full name: Claudia María Poll Ahrens
- Nationality: Costa Rica
- Born: 21 December 1972 (age 53) Managua, Nicaragua
- Height: 1.91 m (6 ft 3 in)

Sport
- Sport: Swimming
- Strokes: Freestyle
- Club: Asociación de Natación Cariari
Medal record
Women's swimming
Representing Costa Rica
Olympic Games
Gold medal – first place	1996 Atlanta	200 m freestyle
Bronze medal – third place	2000 Sydney	200 m freestyle
Bronze medal – third place	2000 Sydney	400 m freestyle
World Championships (LC)
Gold medal – first place	1998 Perth	200 m freestyle
Silver medal – second place	2001 Fukuoka	400 m freestyle
Bronze medal – third place	1994 Rome	200 m freestyle
Bronze medal – third place	1994 Rome	400 m freestyle
World Championships (SC)
Gold medal – first place	1995 Rio de Janeiro	200 m freestyle
Gold medal – first place	1995 Rio de Janeiro	400 m freestyle
Gold medal – first place	1997 Gothenburg	200 m freestyle
Gold medal – first place	1997 Gothenburg	400 m freestyle
Pan Pacific Championships
Gold medal – first place	1993 Kobe	200 m freestyle
Gold medal – first place	1997 Fukuoka	200 m freestyle
Gold medal – first place	1997 Fukuoka	400 m freestyle
Silver medal – second place	1993 Kobe	400 m freestyle
Silver medal – second place	1997 Fukuoka	800 m freestyle
Bronze medal – third place	1993 Kobe	800 m freestyle
Bronze medal – third place	1995 Atlanta	200 m freestyle
Bronze medal – third place	1999 Sydney	400 m freestyle

Claudia María Poll Ahrens (born 21 December 1972) is a Costa Rican-Nicaraguan former swimmer who competed in the 200 m to 800 m freestyle events. She is Costa Rica's only Olympic gold-medalist, having won the country's first Olympic gold medal at the 1996 Olympics in the 200 meter freestyle. Claudia also competed at the 2000 Olympics, where she won two bronze medals. She is a multiple national record holder in the freestyle events.

She is the first person from Central America to win an Olympic gold medal. She was the only to do so until the 2008 Olympic Games when long jump athlete Irving Saladino of Panama won a gold medal.

== Career ==
Claudia Poll began swimming in 1979 under coach Francisco Rivas and quickly became one of the best in Central America, winning many regional titles.

At the 1996 Atlanta Olympics she won the gold medal in the 200 m freestyle event. The win was the first gold medal for Costa Rica in the Summer Olympic Games. It was a surprising win because she beat the favorite German Franziska van Almsick. Dagmar Hase from Germany won the bronze.

In 1997, she was named by Swimming World Magazine as the Female Swimmer of the Year.

At the Sydney 2000, Poll continued with her medal run and won two bronze medals. In Athens 2004, she just missed out on the 400 m freestyle final, finishing ninth in the heats.

In 2002, she was given a four-year doping ban after a failed test for norandrosterone, a metabolite the steroid nandrolone. Her ban was later reduced by FINA (International Swimming Federation) to two years. Poll claimed that the test and sampling methods were flawed and protested her innocence.

At the 2006 Central American and Caribbean Games, she set the Games Records in the 200 and 400 freestyles (2:00.19 and 4:15.01), bettering the time her sister Silvia set at the 1986 Central American and Caribbean Games.

Poll served as a swimming analyst for the U.S. Telemundo network's Spanish-language coverage of the 2012 Summer Olympics in London, though she and most of the Telemundo broadcast crew performed their duties at the network's studios in Hialeah, Florida, accompanied by video provided by Olympic Broadcasting Services.

== Personal life ==
Claudia’s parents are both German, but they moved to Nicaragua before starting a family. Claudia and her sister Silvia were both born in Managua, Nicaragua, but moved shortly after Claudia’s birth in 1972. The family had decided that rising political tensions and the 1972 Nicaragua earthquake meant it would be safer to live in Costa Rica. Claudia is not related to Marlene Ahrens, another Olympic athlete and medalist and another Latin American of German descent.

Claudia graduated in Business Administration from the Universidad Internacional de las Américas, San José, Costa Rica, in 1998. She had her first child, a daughter named Cecilia, on August 8, 2007. Claudia's older sister, Silvia Poll, won Costa Rica's first Olympic medal, a silver medal, at the 1988 Games. As of 2021, Claudia and Silvia are the only Costa Ricans to have won a medal at an Olympics.

== Honors ==
- Declared "Honor Citizen" by the Costa Rican Congress in 1996;
- Costa Rican Sportswoman of the Year in 1993, 1994, 1995, 1996, 1997, 1998, 1999, and 2000;
- Named Best Latin American Athlete in 1995, 1996, and 1997 by the Agencia Prensa Latina
- Named 1997 World Swimmer of the Year by Swimming World Magazine
- Declared Costa Rica's Athlete of the Century in 1999.

== See also ==
- List of doping cases in sport
- World record progression 200 metres freestyle
- World record progression 400 metres freestyle

Records
Preceded by Incumbent	Women's 400 metre freestyle world record holder (short course); April 18, 1997 – January 26, 2003	Succeeded by Lindsay Benko
Awards
Preceded by Penny Heyns	World Swimmer of the Year; 1997	Succeeded by Jenny Thompson
