= Vladislav Nelyubin =

Soviet cyclist

Personal information
- Born: 8 November 1947 (age 78) Frunze, Kirghiz SSR, Soviet Union

Cycling career
- Sport: Cycling

Vladislav Nelyubin (Russian: Владислав Викторович Нелюбин; born 8 November 1947) is a former Soviet cyclist. He competed in the individual road race at the 1968 Summer Olympics. His son was Dmitry Nelyubin.

Nelyubin was runner-up at the 1972 Peace Race.
