= Costa Rica at the 2008 Summer Olympics =

- IOC code: CRC
- NOC: Comité Olímpico de Costa Rica
- Website: www.concrc.org (in Spanish)

in Beijing
- Competitors: 8 in 5 sports
- Flag bearer: Allan Segura
- Medals: Gold 0 Silver 0 Bronze 0 Total 0

Summer Olympics appearances (overview)
- 1936; 1948–1960; 1964; 1968; 1972; 1976; 1980; 1984; 1988; 1992; 1996; 2000; 2004; 2008; 2012; 2016; 2020; 2024

Costa Rica competed in the 2008 Summer Olympics, held in Beijing, People's Republic of China from August 8 to August 24, 2008. Eight Costa Rican athletes competed in five sports. The country did not win any medals at these Games.

== Athletics ==
Key

- Note–Ranks given for track events are within the athlete's heat only
- Q = Qualified for the next round
- q = Qualified for the next round as a fastest loser or, in field events, by position without achieving the qualifying target
- NR = National record
- N/A = Round not applicable for the event
- Bye = Athlete not required to compete in round

Men

| Athlete | Event | Heat | | Semifinal | | Final | |
| Athlete | Event | Result | Rank | Result | Rank | Result | Rank |
|---|---|---|---|---|---|---|---|
| Nery Brenes | 400 m | 45.36 | 1 Q | 44.94 | 4 | Did not advance | |
| Allan Segura | 20 km walk | — | | | | 1:27:10 | 39 |

Women

| Athlete | Event | Final | |
| Athlete | Event | Result | Rank |
|---|---|---|---|
| Gabriela Traña | Marathon | 2:53:45 | 68 |

== Cycling ==
=== Road ===
| Athlete | Event | Time | Rank |
|---|---|---|---|
| Henry Raabe | Men's road race | Did not finish | |

=== Mountain biking ===
| Athlete | Event | Time | Rank |
|---|---|---|---|
| Federico Ramírez | Men's cross-country | LAP (5 laps) | 47 |

== Swimming ==
Men

| Athlete | Event | Heat | | Semifinal | | Final | |
| Athlete | Event | Time | Rank | Time | Rank | Time | Rank |
|---|---|---|---|---|---|---|---|
| Mario Montoya | 200 m freestyle | 1:52.19 NR | 50 | Did not advance | | | |

Women

| Athlete | Event | Heat | | Semifinal | | Final | |
| Athlete | Event | Time | Rank | Time | Rank | Time | Rank |
|---|---|---|---|---|---|---|---|
| Marianela Quesada | 50 m freestyle | 28.11 | 47 | Did not advance | | | |

== Taekwondo ==
| Athlete | Event | Round of 16 | Quarterfinals | Semifinals | Repechage | Bronze Medal | Final | |
| Athlete | Event | Opposition Result | Opposition Result | Opposition Result | Opposition Result | Opposition Result | Opposition Result | Rank |
|---|---|---|---|---|---|---|---|---|
| Kristopher Moitland | Men's +80 kg | Cha D-M (KOR); L (−2)–1 | Did not advance | | Irgashev (UZB); L 5–6 | Did not advance | | |

== See also ==
- Costa Rica at the 2007 Pan American Games
- Costa Rica at the 2010 Central American and Caribbean Games
