= Ignace Mandjambi =

Congolese cyclist

Personal information
- Born: 8 October 1940 (age 86) Lisala, Belgian Congo

Cycling career
- Sport: Cycling

Ignace Mandjambi (born 8 October 1940) is a former Congolese cyclist. He competed in the individual road race at the 1968 Summer Olympics.
