= Evelyn Schuler =

Brazilian alpine skier (born 1974)

Personal information
- Nationality: Brazilian
- Born: 17 December 1974 (age 50)

Sport
- Sport: Alpine skiing

Evelyn Schuler (born 17 December 1974) is a Brazilian alpine skier. She competed in two events at the 1992 Winter Olympics.
