= Johari Ramli =

Malaysian cyclist

Personal information
- Born: 20 March 1949 (age 77) Kedah, Malaysia

Cycling career
- Sport: Cycling

Johari Ramli (born 20 March 1949) is a Malaysian former cyclist. He competed in the individual road race at the 1968 Summer Olympics, but did not finish.
