= Suriyong Hemint =

Thai cyclist

Personal information
- Born: 10 March 1948 (age 78) Bangkok, Thailand

Cycling career
- Sport: Cycling

Suriyong Hemint (born 10 March 1948) is a former Thai cyclist. He competed in the individual road race at the 1968 Summer Olympics.
