= Trương Kim Hùng =

Vietnamese cyclist

Personal information
- Born: 8 December 1951 Saigon, Vietnam
- Died: 26 August 2020 (aged 68) United States

Cycling career
- Sport: Cycling

Trương Kim Hùng (8 December 1951 – 26 August 2020) was a Vietnamese cyclist. He competed in the individual road race event at the 1968 Summer Olympics.
