= Gabriel Cuéllar =

Mexican cyclist

Personal information
- Born: 26 September 1942 (age 84) Tezontepec de Aldama, Mexico

Cycling career
- Sport: Cycling

Gabriel Cuéllar (born 26 September 1942) is a former Mexican cyclist. He competed in the individual road race at the 1968 Summer Olympics.
