= Gerardo Cavallieri =

Argentine cyclist

Personal information
- Born: 29 July 1942 Nusco, Avellino, Italy
- Died: 6 February 2023 (aged 80)

Cycling career
- Sport: Cycling

Gerardo Cavaliere Grosso (29 July 1942 – 6 February 2023) was an Argentine cyclist. He competed in the individual road race at the 1968 Summer Olympics where he did not finish.

Cavallieri was born in Italy and raised in Bella Vista, Buenos Aires before spending the rest of his life in San Juan Province. He competed at the 1965 Vuelta del Uruguay race, winning the tenth stage.
