= Costa Rica at the Olympics =

- IOC code: CRC
- NOC: Comité Olímpico de Costa Rica
- Website: www.concrc.org (in Spanish)
- Medals Ranked 107th: Gold 1 Silver 1 Bronze 2 Total 4

Summer appearances
- 1936; 1948–1960; 1964; 1968; 1972; 1976; 1980; 1984; 1988; 1992; 1996; 2000; 2004; 2008; 2012; 2016; 2020; 2024; 2028

Winter appearances
- 1980; 1984; 1988; 1992; 1994–1998; 2002; 2006; 2010–2026

Costa Rica first participated at the Olympic Games in 1936, but then missed the next four Olympiads. The nation returned to the Games in 1964 and has participated in every Summer Olympic Games since then. The nation has also participated at the Winter Olympic Games in 6 occasions: 1980 to 1992, 2002 and 2006.

Costa Rican athletes have won a total of four medals, all by Silvia Poll and Claudia Poll in swimming.

The National Olympic Committee for Costa Rica was created in 1936 and recognized by the International Olympic Committee in the same year. The N.O.C. was named Comité Olímpico de Costa Rica.

== Medal tables ==
=== Medals by Summer Games ===
Games	Athletes	Gold	Silver	Bronze	Total	Rank
(Nazi Germany) 1936 Berlin	1	0	0	0	0	–
1948–1960	did not participate					
(Japan) 1964 Tokyo	2	0	0	0	0	–
1968 Mexico City	20	0	0	0	0	–
(West Germany) 1972 Munich	3	0	0	0	0	–
(Canada) 1976 Montreal	5	0	0	0	0	–
(Soviet Union) 1980 Moscow	32	0	0	0	0	–
(United States) 1984 Los Angeles	30	0	0	0	0	–
(South Korea) 1988 Seoul	15	0	1	0	1	36
(Spain) 1992 Barcelona	16	0	0	0	0	–
(United States) 1996 Atlanta	11	1	0	0	1	49
(Australia) 2000 Sydney	7	0	0	2	2	69
(Greece) 2004 Athens	20	0	0	0	0	–
(China) 2008 Beijing	8	0	0	0	0	–
(United Kingdom) 2012 London	11	0	0	0	0	–
(Brazil) 2016 Rio de Janeiro	11	0	0	0	0	–
(Japan) 2020 Tokyo	14	0	0	0	0	–
(France) 2024 Paris	6	0	0	0	0	–
(United States) 2028 Los Angeles	future event					
(Australia) 2032 Brisbane	future event					
Total		1	1	2	4	107

=== Medals by Winter Games ===
Games	Athletes	Gold	Silver	Bronze	Total	Rank
(United States) 1980 Lake Placid	1	0	0	0	0	–
(Socialist Federal Republic of Yugoslavia) 1984 Sarajevo	3	0	0	0	0	–
(Canada) 1988 Calgary	2	0	0	0	0	–
(France) 1992 Albertville	4	0	0	0	0	–
(Norway) 1994 Lillehammer	did not participate					
(Japan) 1998 Nagano	did not participate					
(United States) 2002 Salt Lake City	1	0	0	0	0	–
(Italy) 2006 Turin	1	0	0	0	0	–
2010–2026	did not participate					
(France) 2030 French Alps	future event					
(United States) 2034 Utah	future event					
Total		0	0	0	0	–

=== Medals by summer sport ===
Sports	Gold	Silver	Bronze	Total	Rank
Swimming	1	1	2	4	36
Total	1	1	2	4	101

== List of medalists ==
Medal	Name	Games	Sport	Event
Silver	Silvia Poll	(South Korea) 1988 Seoul	Swimming	Women's 200 m freestyle
Gold	Claudia Poll	(United States) 1996 Atlanta	Swimming	Women's 200 m freestyle
Bronze	Claudia Poll	(Australia) 2000 Sydney	Swimming	Women's 200 m freestyle
Bronze	Claudia Poll	(Australia) 2000 Sydney	Swimming	Women's 400 m freestyle

== See also ==
- Category:Olympic competitors for Costa Rica
- List of flag bearers for Costa Rica at the Olympics
- Costa Rica at the Paralympics
- Tropical nations at the Winter Olympics
