= Richard Roett =

Barbadian cyclist

Personal information
- Born: 18 January 1943 Barbados
- Died: December 2002

Cycling career
- Sport: Cycling

Richard Roett (18 January 1943 – December 2002) was a Barbadian cyclist. He competed in the individual road race at the 1968 Summer Olympics.
