= Solo Razafinarivo =

Malagasy cyclist

Personal information
- Born: 5 January 1938 (age 88) Antsirabe, Madagascar

Cycling career
- Sport: Cycling

Solo Razafinarivo (born 5 January 1938) is a former Malagasy cyclist. He competed in the individual road race at the 1968 Summer Olympics.
