= Costa Rica at the 2024 Summer Olympics =

- IOC code: CRC
- NOC: Costa Rican Olympic Committee
- Website: www.concrc.org (in Spanish)

in Paris, France 26 July 2024 – 11 August 2024
- Competitors: 6 (3 men and 3 women) in 5 sports
- Flag bearers: Gerald Drummond & Milagro Mena
- Medals: Gold 0 Silver 0 Bronze 0 Total 0

Summer Olympics appearances (overview)
- 1936; 1948–1960; 1964; 1968; 1972; 1976; 1980; 1984; 1988; 1992; 1996; 2000; 2004; 2008; 2012; 2016; 2020; 2024

Costa Rica competed at the 2024 Summer Olympics in Paris from 26 July to 11 August 2024. It was the nation's seventeenth appearance at the Summer Olympics, since its debut in 1936.

Like in the 2020 Summer Olympics, Costa Rica failed to secure a single medal after the 2024 Summer Olympics.

== Competitors ==
The following is the list of number of competitors in the Games.

Sport	Men	Women	Total
Athletics	1	0	1
Cycling	0	1	1
Judo	1	0	1
Surfing	0	1	1
Swimming	1	1	2
Total	3	3	6

== Athletics ==
Costa Rican track and field athletes achieved the entry standards for Paris 2024, either by passing the direct qualifying mark (or time for track and road races) or by world ranking, in the following events (a maximum of 3 athletes each):

Key

- Note–Ranks given for track events are within the athlete's heat only
- Q = Qualified for the next round
- q = Qualified for the next round as a fastest loser or, in field events, by position without achieving the qualifying target
- NR = National record
- N/A = Round not applicable for the event
- Bye = Athlete not required to compete in round

Track and road events

Athlete	Event	Heat		Repechage		Semifinal		Final	
Athlete	Event	Result	Rank	Result	Rank	Result	Rank	Result	Rank
Gerald Drummond	Men's 400 m hurdles	48.80	7	48.78	2 Q	49.68	7	Did not advance	

== Cycling ==
=== Road ===
Costa Rica was represented by one female rider, Milagro Mena, in the road race events at the Olympics, after securing the spot through the 2023 Pan American Road Championships in Panama City, Panama.

Athlete	Event	Time	Rank
Milagro Mena	Women's road race	DNF	

== Judo ==
Costa Rica qualified one judoka for the following weight class at the Games. Sebastian Sancho (men's extra-lightweight, 60 kg) got qualified via continental quota based on Olympic point rankings.

Athlete	Event	Round of 32	Round of 16	Quarterfinals	Semifinals	Repechage	Final / BM	
Athlete	Event	Opposition Result	Opposition Result	Opposition Result	Opposition Result	Opposition Result	Opposition Result	Rank
Sebastian Sancho	Men's –60 kg	Augusto (BRA); L 00–01	Did not advance					

== Surfing ==
Costa Rican surfers confirmed a single shortboard quota place for Tahiti. Tokyo 2020 Olympian Brisa Hennessy finished among the top eight of those eligible for qualification in the 2023 World Surf League rankings to secure Costa Rica's first coveted spot for her second Games.

Athlete	Event	Round 1		Round 2		Round 3	Quarterfinal	Semifinal	Final / BM	
Athlete	Event	Score	Rank	Score	Rank	Opposition Result	Opposition Result	Opposition Result	Opposition Result	Rank
Brisa Hennessy	Women's shortboard	15.56	1 R3	Bye		Hopkins (POR); W 12.34 – 9.90	Silva (BRA); W 6.37 – 5.47	Weston-Webb (BRA); L 13.66 – 6.17	Defay (FRA); L 12.66 – 4.93	4

== Swimming ==
Costa Rica sent two swimmers to compete at the 2024 Paris Olympics.

Athlete	Event	Heat		Semifinal		Final	
Athlete	Event	Time	Rank	Time	Rank	Time	Rank
Alberto Vega	Men's 400 m freestyle	4:03.14	35	—		Did not advance	
Alondra Ortiz	Women's 200 m butterfly	2:18.56	18	Did not advance			
