= Costa Rica at the 2016 Summer Olympics =

- IOC code: CRC
- NOC: Comité Olímpico de Costa Rica
- Website: www.concrc.org (in Spanish)

in Rio de Janeiro
- Competitors: 11 in 6 sports
- Flag bearer: Nery Brenes
- Medals: Gold 0 Silver 0 Bronze 0 Total 0

Summer Olympics appearances (overview)
- 1936; 1948–1960; 1964; 1968; 1972; 1976; 1980; 1984; 1988; 1992; 1996; 2000; 2004; 2008; 2012; 2016; 2020; 2024; 2028

Costa Rica competed at the 2016 Summer Olympics in Rio de Janeiro, Brazil, from 5 to 21 August 2016. This was the nation's fifteenth appearance at the Summer Olympics, since its debut in 1936.

Costa Rican Olympic Committee (Spanish: Comité Olímpico de Costa Rica) selected a squad of 11 athletes, six men and five women, to compete in six different sports at the Games. This was approximately the same contingent size as the previous Games, with the addition of two female athletes and the difference of two males. Among the sports represented by the athletes, Costa Rica marked its Olympic debut in beach volleyball.

Nearly half of the Costa Rican roster had competed in London 2012, with sprinter Nery Brenes leading the athletes as the most experienced member and the nation's flag bearer in the opening ceremony at his third Games.

For the fourth consecutive time, Costa Rica left Rio de Janeiro without a single Olympic medal. Unable to reach the final, Brenes was the only athlete to produce a best finish for the Costa Rican squad at the Games, placing sixth each in the semifinal heat of both the men's 200 and 400 metres.

== Athletics (track and field) ==
Costa Rican athletes have so far achieved qualifying standards in the following athletics events (up to a maximum of 3 athletes in each event):

Key

- Note–Ranks given for track events are within the athlete's heat only
- Q = Qualified for the next round
- q = Qualified for the next round as a fastest loser or, in field events, by position without achieving the qualifying target
- NR = National record
- N/A = Round not applicable for the event
- Bye = Athlete not required to compete in round

Track & road events

Athlete	Event	Heat		Semifinal		Final	
Athlete	Event	Result	Rank	Result	Rank	Result	Rank
Nery Brenes	Men's 200 m	20.20	1 Q	20.33	6	Did not advance	
Nery Brenes	Men's 400 m	45.53	2 Q	45.02	6	Did not advance	
Sharolyn Scott	Women's 400 m hurdles	58.27	7	Did not advance			

Field events

Athlete	Event	Qualification		Final	
Athlete	Event	Distance	Position	Distance	Position
Roberto Sawyers	Men's hammer throw	70.08	24	Did not advance	

== Cycling ==
=== Road ===
Costa Rica has qualified one rider in the men's Olympic road race by virtue of his top 5 national ranking in the 2015 UCI America Tour.

Athlete	Event	Time	Rank
Andrey Amador	Men's road race	6:30:05	54
Milagro Mena	Women's road race	Did not finish	

=== Mountain biking ===
Costa Rica has qualified one mountain biker for the men's Olympic cross-country race, by virtue of a top two national finish, not yet qualified, at the 2015 Pan American Championships.

Athlete	Event	Time	Rank
Andrey Fonseca	Men's cross-country	1:44:54	33

== Judo ==
Costa Rica has qualified one judoka for the men's lightweight category (73 kg) at the Games. Miguel Murillo earned a continental quota spot from the Pan American region as highest-ranked Costa Rican judoka outside of direct qualifying position in the IJF World Ranking List of 30 May 2016.

Athlete	Event	Round of 64	Round of 32	Round of 16	Quarterfinals	Semifinals	Repechage	Final / BM	
Athlete	Event	Opposition Result	Opposition Result	Opposition Result	Opposition Result	Opposition Result	Opposition Result	Opposition Result	Rank
Miguel Murillo	Men's −73 kg	Bye	Ono (JPN); L 000–100	Did not advance					

== Swimming ==
Costa Rica has received a Universality invitation from FINA to send a female swimmer to the Olympics.

Athlete	Event	Heat		Semifinal		Final	
Athlete	Event	Time	Rank	Time	Rank	Time	Rank
Marie Laura Meza	Women's 100 m butterfly	1:02.01	36	Did not advance			

== Triathlon ==
Costa Rica has entered one triathlete to compete at the Games. London 2012 Olympian Leonardo Chacón was ranked among the top 40 eligible triathletes in the men's event based on the ITU Olympic Qualification List as of 15 May 2016.

Athlete	Event	Swim (1.5 km)	Trans 1	Bike (40 km)	Trans 2	Run (10 km)	Total Time	Rank
Leonardo Chacón	Men's	18:11	0:48	55:43	0:38	33:46	1:49.06	30

== Volleyball ==
=== Beach ===
Costa Rica women's beach volleyball team qualified directly for the Olympics by winning the final match over Mexico at the 2016 NORCECA Continental Cup in Guaymas, Mexico, signifying the nation's Olympic debut in the sport.

Athlete	Event	Preliminary round	Standing	Round of 16	Quarterfinals	Semifinals	Final / BM	
Athlete	Event	Opposition Score	Standing	Opposition Score	Opposition Score	Opposition Score	Opposition Score	Rank
Nathalia Alfaro; Karen Cope	Women's	Pool F Bawden – Clancy (AUS); L 0 – 2 (15–21, 14–21); Meppelink – van Iersel (NED); L 0 – 2 (16–21, 16–21); Agudo – Pérez (VEN); L 0 – 2 (16–21, 19–21)	4	Did not advance				

== See also ==
- Costa Rica at the 2015 Pan American Games
- Costa Rica at the 2016 Summer Paralympics
