= George Tajirian =

Iraqi cyclist

George Artin Tajirian
- جورج أرتين تاجريان
- Born: 5 November 1941; Baghdad, Iraq
- Died: 30 November 2001
- Other name: George the Iraqi
- Citizenship: Mexican
- Known for: Iraqi cyclist; smuggler
- Height: 174 cm (5 ft 9 in)
- Spouse: Maria Soledad Martinez-Rangel
- Accomplices: Maria Soledad Martinez-Rangel; Katia Anbousi

Details
- Date apprehended: 1998

George Artin Tajirian (Note: Also spelt/known as: George Tajrian, George Tagerian (Korkorartin), George Tajerian.; George Tagarian Korkorartin, George Tagirian; George Tagirian Korkorartin.) (Arabic: جورج أرتين تاجريان; 5 November 1941 – 30 November 2001) was a former Iraqi cyclist and convicted smuggler. He competed in the individual road race at the 1968 Summer Olympics.

== Early life ==
George Artin Tajirian was born on 5 November 1941 in Baghdad, Iraq. When he was young, his parents gifted him a red bicycle because he was a "destructive youngster", thinking that "it would keep him away from the house where [he] would destroy everything in sight." By October 1968, his collection of bicycles had grown to 28, including "two 24-pound white racers" that he took to the 1968 Summer Olympics.

== Career ==
In February 1967 in Paris, France, Tajirian cycled for 129 and a half hours without eating or sleeping, setting a world record for cycling endurance. He stated that "[his] only nourishment was some water [and that he] had a flask strapped to my racer." At the 1968 Summer Olympics in Mexico, Tajirian competed in the men's individual road race held on 23 October 1968, but did not finish the race.

== Later life ==
Tajirian died on 30 November 2001.
