= Jan Erik Gustavsen =

Norwegian cyclist

Personal information
- Born: 6 February 1946 (age 80) Brandval, Norway

Cycling career
- Sport: Cycling

Jan Erik Gustavsen (born 6 February 1946) is a former Norwegian cyclist. He competed in the individual road race at the 1968 Summer Olympics.
