= Bryce Beeston =

New Zealand cyclist (born 1947)

Personal information
- Born: 30 September 1947 (age 79) Whangārei, New Zealand

Cycling career
- Sport: Cycling

Bryce Beeston (born 30 September 1947) is a New Zealand cyclist. He competed in the individual road race at the 1968 Summer Olympics.
