= Héctor Cassina =

Argentine cyclist

Personal information
- Born: 6 October 1943 Rafaela, Argentina
- Died: 1 December 1985 (aged 42)

Cycling career
- Sport: Cycling

Héctor Cassina (6 October 1943 – 1 December 1985) was an Argentine cyclist. He competed in the individual road race at the 1968 Summer Olympics.
