= Costa Rica at the 2006 Winter Olympics =

- IOC code: CRC
- NOC: Comité Olímpico de Costa Rica
- Website: www.concrc.org (in Spanish)

in Turin
- Competitors: 1 in 1 sport
- Flag bearers: Arthur James Barton (opening); Arturo Kinch (closing)
- Medals: Gold 0 Silver 0 Bronze 0 Total 0

Winter Olympics appearances (overview)
- 1980; 1984; 1988; 1992; 1994–1998; 2002; 2006; 2010–2026

One athlete from Costa Rica competed at the 2006 Winter Olympics in Turin, Italy.

== Cross-country skiing ==
Arturo Kinch, participating in his 5th Olympics at 49 years old, finished 95th in his only race, ahead of one other racer.

Distance

Athlete	Event	Final	
Athlete	Event	Total	Rank
Arturo Kinch	Men's 15 km classical	1:06:50.3	95
