= Costa Rica at the 2020 Summer Olympics =

- IOC code: CRC
- NOC: Costa Rican Olympic Committee
- Website: www.concrc.org (in Spanish)

in Tokyo, Japan July 23, 2021 – August 8, 2021
- Competitors: 14 in 7 sports
- Flag bearers (opening): Andrea Vargas; Ian Sancho Chinchila
- Flag bearer (closing): Noelia Vargas
- Medals: Gold 0 Silver 0 Bronze 0 Total 0

Summer Olympics appearances (overview)
- 1936; 1948–1960; 1964; 1968; 1972; 1976; 1980; 1984; 1988; 1992; 1996; 2000; 2004; 2008; 2012; 2016; 2020; 2024

Costa Rica competed at the 2020 Summer Olympics in Tokyo. Originally scheduled to take place from 24 July to 9 August 2020, the Games were postponed to 23 July to 8 August 2021, because of the COVID-19 pandemic. It was the nation's sixteenth appearance at the Summer Olympics, since its debut in 1936. Costa Rica failed to win any medal for the fifth consecutive Olympics.

== Competitors ==
The following is the list of number of competitors participating in the Games:

Sport	Men	Women	Total
Athletics	1	2	3
Cycling	2	1	3
Gymnastics	0	1	1
Judo	1	0	1
Surfing	1	2	3
Swimming	1	1	2
Taekwondo	0	1	1
Total	6	8	14

== Athletics ==
Costa Rican athletes further achieved the entry standards, either by qualifying time or by world ranking, in the following track and field events (up to a maximum of 3 athletes in each event):

Key

- Note–Ranks given for track events are within the athlete's heat only
- Q = Qualified for the next round
- q = Qualified for the next round as a fastest loser or, in field events, by position without achieving the qualifying target
- NR = National record
- N/A = Round not applicable for the event
- Bye = Athlete not required to compete in round

Track & road events

Athlete	Event	Heat		Semifinal		Final	
Athlete	Event	Result	Rank	Result	Rank	Result	Rank
Gerald Drummond	Men's 400 m hurdles	49.92	7	Did not advance			
Andrea Vargas	Women's 100 m hurdles	12.71 SB	1 Q	12.69	3	Did not advance	
Noelia Vargas	Women's 20 km walk	—				1:35:07	21

== Cycling ==
=== Road ===
Costa Rica entered one rider each to compete in the men's and women's Olympic road races, by virtue of his top 50 national finish (for men) and her top 100 individual finish (for women) in the UCI World Ranking.

Athlete	Event	Time	Rank
Andrey Amador	Men's road race	6:21:46	68
María José Vargas	Women's road race	Did not finish	

=== BMX ===
Costa Rica entered one BMX rider to compete in the men's freestyle, by finishing in the top two at the 2019 UCI Urban Cycling World Championships in Chengdu, China.

Athlete	Event	Seeding		Final	
Athlete	Event	Score	Rank	Score	Rank
Kenneth Tencio	Men's freestyle	79.80	6	90.5	4

== Gymnastics ==
=== Artistic ===
Costa Rica entered one artistic gymnast into the Olympic competition, marking the country's debut in the sport. Luciana Alvarado scored a third-place finish to book the last of two available berths in the women's individual all-around and apparatus events at the 2021 Pan American Championships in Rio de Janeiro, Brazil.

Women

Athlete	Event	Qualification						Final					
Athlete	Event	Apparatus				Total	Rank	Apparatus				Total	Rank
Athlete	Event	V	UB	BB	F	Total	Rank	V	UB	BB	F	Total	Rank
Luciana Alvarado	All-around	13.433	12,741	12.966	12.166	51.306	51	Did not advance					

== Judo ==
Costa Rica qualified one judoka for the men's half-lightweight category (66 kg) at the Games. Ian Sancho Chinchila accepted a continental berth from the Americas as the nation's top-ranked judoka outside of direct qualifying position in the IJF World Ranking List of June 28, 2021.

Athlete	Event	Round of 32	Round of 16	Quarterfinals	Semifinals	Repechage	Final / BM	
Athlete	Event	Opposition Result	Opposition Result	Opposition Result	Opposition Result	Opposition Result	Opposition Result	Rank
Ian Sancho Chinchila	Men's −66 kg	Cullhaj (ALB); W 11–00	An B-u (KOR); L 00–10	Did not advance				

== Surfing ==
Costa Rica sent two surfers to compete in the women's shortboard race and one surfer to compete in the men's shortboard race at the Games. Brisa Hennessy finished within the top eight of those eligible for qualification in the World Surf League rankings to secure her place on the Costa Rican roster for Tokyo 2020, with Leilani McGonagle joining her with a top-two finish in her heat at the 2021 ISA World Surfing Games in El Salvador. On July 23, Carlos Muñoz Herrera joined the nation's surfing squad at the Games after Portugal's Frederico Morais tested positive for COVID-19.

Athlete	Event	Round 1		Round 2		Round 3	Quarterfinal	Semifinal	Final/BM
Athlete	Event	Score	Rank	Score	Rank	Opposition Result	Opposition Result	Opposition Result	Opposition Result
Carlos Muñoz Herrera	Men's shortboard	DNS				Did not advance			
Brisa Hennessy	Women's shortboard	12.20	2 Q	Bye		Williams (NZL); W 12.00–7.73	Marks (USA); L 6.83–12.50	Did not advance	
Leilani McGonagle	Women's shortboard	9.64	3 q	9.63	4	Did not advance			

== Swimming ==
Costa Rica received a universality invitation from FINA to send two top-ranked swimmers (one per gender) in their respective individual events to the Olympics, based on the FINA Points System of June 28, 2021.

Athlete	Event	Heat		Semifinal		Final	
Athlete	Event	Time	Rank	Time	Rank	Time	Rank
Arnoldo Herrera	Men's 200 m breaststroke	2:20.09	38	Did not advance			
Beatriz Padron	Women's 200 m freestyle	2:04.56	25	Did not advance			

== Taekwondo ==
Originally, Costa Rica was not going to participate in taekwondo during these Olympic Games, however, the country received a last minute invitation after the Chilean delegation was unable to send a taekwondo player in the women's 57 kilogram category as a result of a positive test for COVID-19. Costa Rican Olympic Committee selected Nishy Lee Lindo to represent her country for the first time in taekwondo at the Games.

Athlete	Event	Qualification	Round of 16	Quarterfinals	Semifinals	Repechage	Final / BM	
Athlete	Event	Opposition Result	Opposition Result	Opposition Result	Opposition Result	Opposition Result	Opposition Result	Rank
Nishy Lee Lindo	Women's –57 kg	Bye	İlgün (TUR); L 5–16	Did not advance				

== See also ==
- Costa Rica at the 2019 Pan American Games
