= Juan Alves =

Argentine cyclist

Personal information
- Born: 25 March 1939 (age 87) Mar del Plata, Argentina

Cycling career
- Sport: Cycling

Juan Alves (25 March 1939 – 3 February 2009) was an Argentine cyclist who rode in the individual road race at the 1968 Summer Olympics.
