= Mauricio Alvarado =

Costa Rican sports shooter

Personal information
- Nationality: Costa Rican

Sport
- Sport: Sports shooting

Mauricio Alvarado is a Costa Rican sports shooter. He competed in two events at the 1980 Summer Olympics.

Alvarado attended the University of Costa Rica.
