= William Ávila =

Costa Rican footballer (born 1956)

William Avila
Personal information
- Date of birth: 27 October 1956
- Place of birth: Alajuela, Costa Rica
- Date of death: 19 April 2016 (aged 59)
- Place of death: Grecia, Costa Rica
- Position: Midfielder

International career
Years	Team	Apps	(Gls)
- Costa Rica

William Avila (27 October 1956 – 19 April 2016) was a Costa Rican footballer. He competed in the men's tournament at the 1980 Summer Olympics. In 2016, having been diagnosed with prostate cancer, he killed himself by jumping off a bridge.
