= Róger Alvarez =

Costa Rican footballer (born 1952)

Personal information
- Date of birth: 13 December 1952 (age 73)
- Place of birth: Heredia, Costa Rica
- Position: Midfielder

International career
Years	Team	Apps	(Gls)
- Costa Rica

Róger Alvarez (born 13 December 1952) is a Costa Rican former footballer. He competed in the men's tournament at the 1980 Summer Olympics.
