= Orlando Madrigal =

Costa Rican judoka

Personal information
- Born: 13 March 1921 San José, Costa Rica
- Died: 25 June 1991 (aged 70) San José, Costa Rica
- Occupation: Judoka

Sport
- Sport: Judo

Orlando Madrigal (13 March 1921 – 25 June 1991) was a Costa Rican judoka. He competed in the men's middleweight event at the 1964 Summer Olympics. He lost both his bouts at the pool stage and did not advance to the quarterfinals. Madrigal was also the flag bearer for Costa Rica at the 1964 Games.

A 1984 article in La Prensa listed Madrigal as the technical director of the Costa Rican Judo and Jiu-Jitsu Academy.
