= Humberto Solano =

Costa Rican cyclist

Personal information
- Born: 9 December 1944 San José, Costa Rica
- Died: 18 June 2010 (aged 65)

Cycling career
- Sport: Cycling

Humberto Solano (9 December 1944 – 18 June 2010) was a Costa Rican cyclist. He was one of four Costa Rica cyclists to compete in the individual road race at the 1968 Summer Olympics.
