= Daphne Hernández =

Costa Rican diver

Personal information
- Nationality: Costa Rican
- Born: 26 April 1976 (age 48); Harris County, Texas, United States

Sport
- Sport: Diving

Daphne Hernández (born 26 April 1976) is a Costa Rican former diver. She competed in two events at the 1996 Summer Olympics.
