= Gabriel Chernacov =

Costa Rican alpine skier (born 1954)

Personal information
- Nationality: Costa Rican
- Born: 17 April 1954 (age 70)

Sport
- Sport: Alpine skiing

Gabriel Chernacov (born 17 April 1954) is a Costa Rican alpine skier. He competed in the men's giant slalom at the 1992 Winter Olympics.
