= Enzo Frisoni =

Sammarinese cyclist

Personal information
- Born: 10 March 1947 (age 79) Rimini, Italy

Cycling career
- Sport: Cycling

Enzo Frisoni (born 10 March 1947) is a former Sammarinese cyclist. He competed in the individual road race at the 1968 Summer Olympics.
