= German Sánchez (skier) =

Mexican alpine skier (born 1972)

Personal information
- Nationality: Mexican
- Born: 14 February 1972 (age 53)

Sport
- Sport: Alpine skiing

German Sánchez (born 14 February 1972) is a Mexican alpine skier. He competed in two events at the 1992 Winter Olympics.
