= Petr Hladík (cyclist) =

Czech cyclist (born 1948)

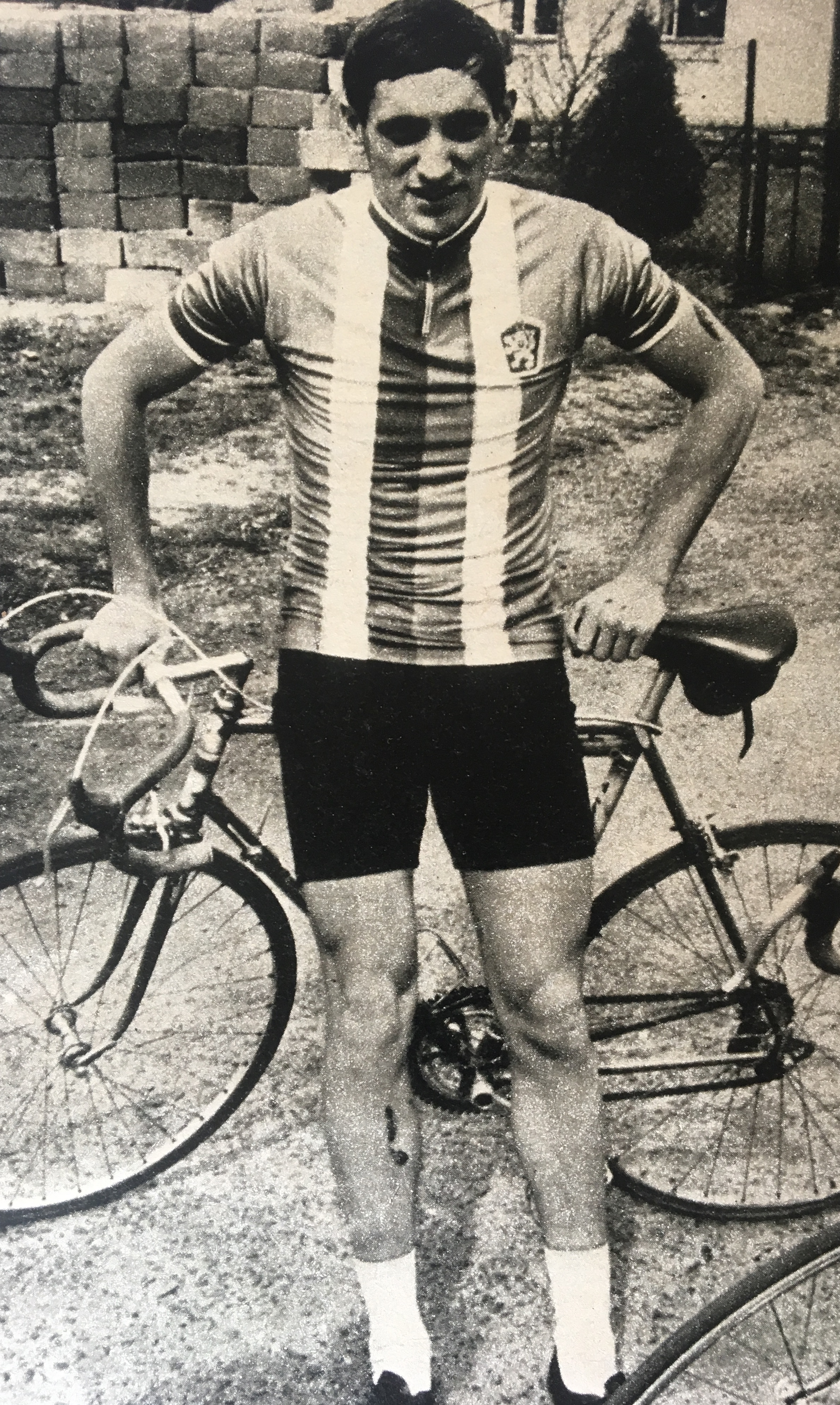

Personal information
- Born: 16 March 1948 (age 78) Ústí nad Orlicí, Czechoslovakia

Cycling career
- Sport: Cycling

Petr Hladík (born 16 March 1948) is a Czech former cyclist. He competed in the individual road race at the 1968 Summer Olympics.
