= Paolo Montoya =

Costa Rican cross-country mountain biker

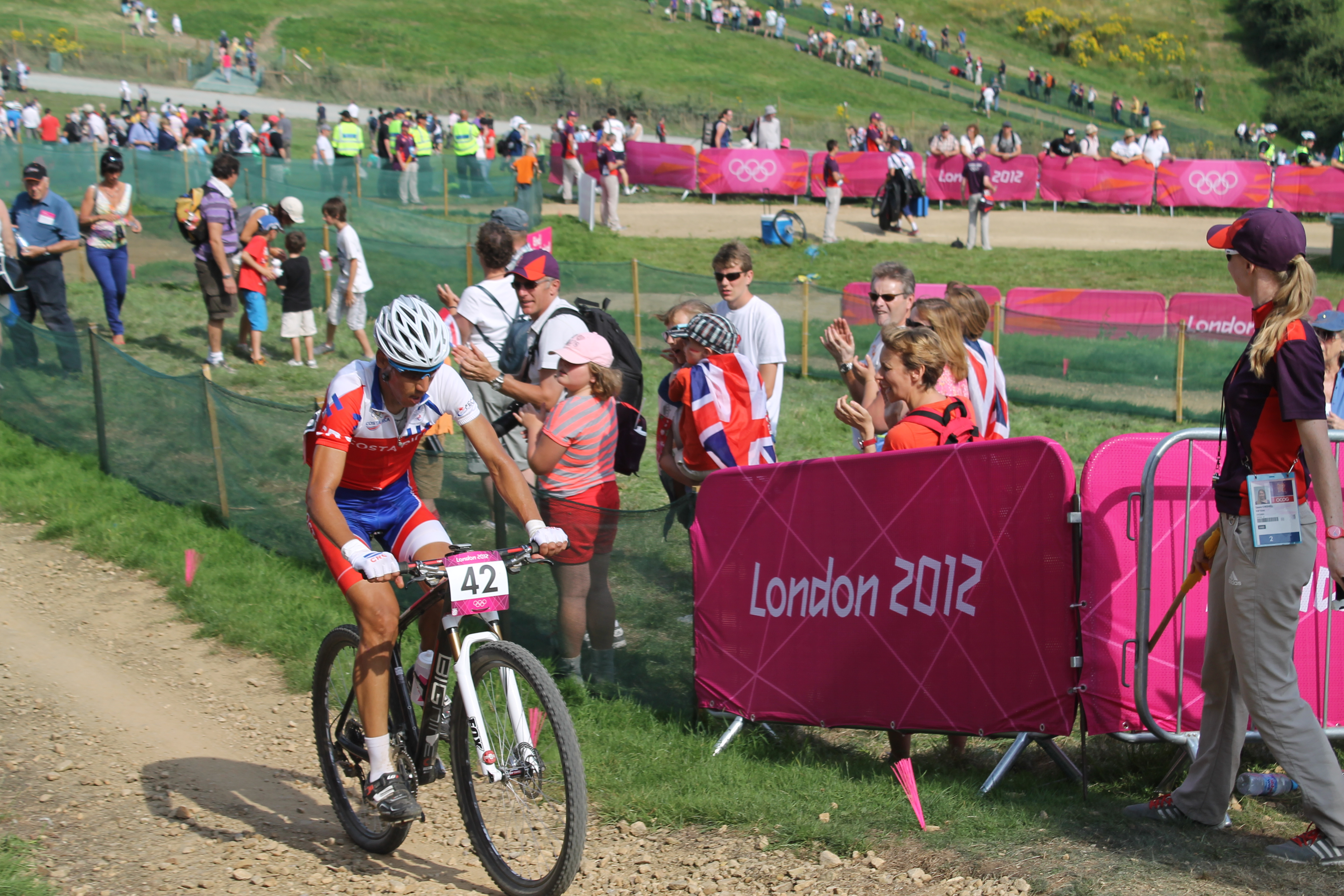
- Montoya at the 2012 Summer Olympics

Personal information
- Full name: Paolo Cesar Montoya Cantillo
- Born: 15 June 1985 (age 41) San José, Costa Rica

Cycling career
- Sport: Cycling
- Discipline: Mountain bike
- Role: Rider

Paolo Cesar Montoya Cantillo (born 15 June 1985) is a Costa Rican cross-country mountain biker. At the 2012 Summer Olympics, he competed in the Men's cross-country at Hadleigh Farm, finishing in 36th place.
