= José Sánchez (cyclist) =

Costa Rican cyclist

Personal information
- Born: 27 July 1941 (age 85) San José, Costa Rica

Cycling career
- Sport: Cycling

José Sánchez (born 27 July 1941) is a former Costa Rican cyclist. He competed in the individual road race and the team time trial (placed 27th) events at the 1968 Summer Olympics.
