= Petr Hladík (diplomat) =

Czech diplomat

Petr Hladík (born 6 September 1969) is a Czech diplomat who served as the ambassador of the Czech Republic to Jordan from 2013 to 2018. He is head of the Department of Middle East and North Africa of Czech Ministry of Foreign Affairs since 2018.

== Career ==
Hladík has previously served:

- Libya (deputy ambassador 1994–1996, chargé d'affaires a.i. 1996–1998).
- Yemen (chargé d'affaires a.i. 1998–1999).
- Israel (deputy ambassador 2001–2004).
