= Jesús Sarabia =

Mexican cyclist

Personal information
- Born: 13 January 1946 (age 80) Mexico City, Mexico

Cycling career
- Sport: Cycling

Jesús Sarabia (born 13 January 1946) is a Mexican former cyclist. He competed at the 1968 Summer Olympics and the 1972 Summer Olympics.
