= Michael Stoute (cyclist) =

Barbadian cyclist

Personal information
- Born: 3 February 1948 (age 78) Barbados

Cycling career
- Sport: Cycling

Michael Clifford Stoute (born 3 February 1948) is a Barbadian former cyclist. He competed in the individual road race at the 1968 Summer Olympics.
