= Carlos Pacheco (sport shooter) =

Costa Rican sports shooter

Personal information
- Born: 26 October 1925 Puntarenas, Costa Rica
- Died: 13 April 2000 (aged 74)

Sport
- Sport: Sports shooting

Carlos Pacheco (26 October 1925 – 13 April 2000) was a Costa Rican sports shooter. He competed in two events at the 1968 Summer Olympics. He was later the president of the national shooting and hunting association and he had a son, Carlos Jr., who was a national shooting champion.
