= Sérgio Schuler =

Brazilian alpine skier (born 1972)

Personal information
- Nationality: Brazilian
- Born: 8 November 1972 (age 52)

Sport
- Sport: Alpine skiing

Sérgio Schuler (born 8 November 1972) is a Brazilian alpine skier. He competed in three events at the 1992 Winter Olympics.
