= Hernán Carazo =

Costa Rican biathlete

Personal information
- Born: 16 August 1955 (age 69); San José, Costa Rica

Sport
- Sport: Biathlon

Hernán Carazo (born 16 August 1955) is a Costa Rican biathlete. He competed in the 20 km individual event at the 1984 Winter Olympics.
