= Hans Egger =

Brazilian alpine skier (born 1962)

Personal information
- Nationality: Brazilian
- Born: 20 March 1962 (age 63)

Sport
- Sport: Alpine skiing

Hans Egger (born 20 March 1962) is a Brazilian alpine skier. He competed in three events at the 1992 Winter Olympics.
