= Miguel Ángel Sánchez (cyclist) =

Costa Rican cyclist (born 1943)

Personal information
- Born: 7 January 1943 (age 83) San José, Costa Rica

Cycling career
- Sport: Cycling

Miguel Ángel Sánchez (born 7 January 1943) is a former Costa Rican cyclist. He competed in the individual road race (placed 63rd) and the team time trial (placed 27th) events at the 1968 Summer Olympics.
