= José Manuel Soto =

Costa Rican cyclist

Personal information
- Born: 19 September 1946 (age 80) San José, Costa Rica

Cycling career
- Sport: Cycling

José Manuel Soto (born 19 September 1946) is a former Costa Rican cyclist. He competed in the individual road race and the team time trial events at the 1968 Summer Olympics. Costa Rican was placed 27th in the team event.
