= Herberth Quesada =

Costa Rican footballer (born 1959)

Personal information
- Date of birth: 28 September 1959 (age 67)

International career
Years	Team	Apps	(Gls)
- Costa Rica

Herberth Quesada (born 28 September 1959) is a Costa Rican footballer. He competed in the men's tournament at the 1980 Summer Olympics.
