= Martin Chernacov =

Costa Rican alpine skier (born 1965)

Personal information
- Nationality: Costa Rican
- Born: 17 October 1965 (age 59)

Sport
- Sport: Alpine skiing

Martin Chernacov (born 17 October 1965) is a Costa Rican alpine skier. He competed in the men's giant slalom at the 1992 Winter Olympics.
