= David Fernández (judoka) =

Costa Rican judoka

Personal information
- Full name: David Fernández Tercero
- Nationality: Costa Rica
- Born: 25 March 1973 (age 53) San José, Costa Rica
- Height: 1.61 m (5 ft 3 1/2 in)
- Weight: 60 kg (132 lb)

Sport
- Sport: Judo
- Event: 60 kg

David Fernández Tercero (born 25 March 1973 in San José) is a retired Costa Rican judoka, who competed in the men's extra lightweight category. Fernandez represented Costa Rica at the 2004 Summer Olympics in Athens, where he was appointed as the nation's flag bearer by the National Olympic Committee (Spanish: Comité Olímpico de Costa Rica) in the opening ceremony. He was invited to compete in the men's extra lightweight class (60 kg) through a wild card entry from the International Judo Federation. Fernandez was ousted early in the opening match to Mexico's Cristobal Aburto, who scored two kokas and a seoi nage (shoulder throw) within a span of nearly three minutes.
