= Juan José Wedel =

Costa Rican archer (1944–2013)

Personal information
- Full name: Juan José Wedel Carazo
- Born: 28 June 1944; San José, Costa Rica
- Died: 20 November 2013 (aged 69); San José, Costa Rica

Sport
- Sport: Archery

Juan José Wedel (28 June 1944 – 20 November 2013) was a Costa Rican archer. He competed in the men's individual event at the 1976 Summer Olympics, and at the 1980 Summer Olympics.
