= Rodrigo Ruiz (sport shooter) =

Costa Rican sports shooter

Personal information
- Born: 21 September 1929 Turrialba, Costa Rica
- Died: 18 June 2014 (aged 84)

Sport
- Sport: Sports shooting

Rodrigo Ruiz (21 September 1929 – 18 June 2014) was a Costa Rican sports shooter. He competed at the 1968 Summer Olympics and the 1980 Summer Olympics.

Ruiz competed for Costa Rica at numerous international tournaments and was considered one of their greatest sport shooters. He also won many national championships and La República described him as the "lord and master of the sport."
