= Alvaro Sanabria =

Costa Rican judoka

Álvaro Sanabria
Personal information
- Full name: Álvaro Alejandro de San Martín Sanabria Mora
- Born: 5 May 1963 (age 61); San José Province, Costa Rica
- Height: 167 cm (5 ft 6 in)
- Weight: 57 kg (126 lb)

Sport
- Sport: Judo

Álvaro Alejandro de San Martín Sanabria Mora (Note: In this Spanish name, the first or paternal surname is Sanabria and the second or maternal family name is Mora.) (born 5 May 1963) is a Costa Rican judoka. He competed at the 1980 Summer Olympics and the 1984 Summer Olympics.
