= Dennis Marshall (footballer, born 1959) =

Costa Rican footballer

Dennis Marshall Herron
Personal information
- Date of birth: 18 December 1959 (age 66)
- Place of birth: San José, Costa Rica

International career
Years	Team	Apps	(Gls)
- Costa Rica

Dennis Marshall Herron (born 18 December 1959) is a Costa Rican footballer. He competed in the men's tournament at the 1980 Summer Olympics.

He is the father of Dennis Marshall, who also played for the Costa Rica national team.
