= Luis Galagarza =

Costa Rican footballer (born 1963)

Personal information
- Full name: Luis Enrique Víquez Galagarza
- Date of birth: August 15, 1963 (age 63)
- Place of birth: Puntarenas, Costa Rica
- Height: 1.83 m (6 ft 0 in)
- Position: Midfielder

Senior career*
Years	Team	Apps	(Gls)
1981–1988	Puntarenas	194	(10)
1989	San Carlos	18	(1)
1991–1992	Puntarenas	58	(1)
1992–1993	Guanacasteca	9	(0)
1995–1997	Puntarenas	26	(0)
Total		305	(12)

International career
1984–1986	Costa Rica	4	(0)
- * Club domestic league appearances and goals

Luis Enrique Víquez Galagarza (born 15 August 1963) is a retired Costa Rican footballer.

== Club career ==
Born in Puntarenas, Galagarza made his professional debut for local side Puntarenas in the Primera Division de Costa Rica on 25 October 1981 against Limonense and won the league title during the 1986–1987 season.

The burly midfielder also played for San Carlos and Guanacasteca. He retired after a game on 28 September 1997 against Carmelita.

== International career ==
He made his debut for Costa Rica in an August 1984 Summer Olympics match against Italy and earned a total of 4 caps. He was part of the squad that played at the 1984 Olympic Games held in Los Angeles.

== Personal life ==
Galagarza is a son of Carlos Luis Víquez Jiménez and Elizabeth Galagarza Calderón. He is divorced and has 3 children.
