= Julio Morales (Costa Rican footballer) =

Costa Rican footballer (born 1957)

Personal information
- Date of birth: 23 May 1957 (age 69)
- Place of birth: Cartago, Costa Rica
- Position: Goalkeeper

International career
Years	Team	Apps	(Gls)
- Costa Rica

Julio Morales (born 23 May 1957) is a Costa Rican former footballer. He competed in the men's tournament at the 1980 Summer Olympics.
