= Alvaro Guardia =

Costa Rican sports shooter

Personal information
- Born: 18 October 1954 (age 71) San José, Costa Rica

Sport
- Sport: Sports shooting

Alvaro Guardia (born 18 October 1954) is a Costa Rican former sports shooter. He competed at the 1980 Summer Olympics and the 1992 Summer Olympics. He was the flag bearer for Costa Rica in the 1992 opening ceremony.
