= Ronny Sanabria =

Costa Rican judoka

Personal information
- Nationality: Costa Rican
- Born: 12 April 1964 (age 61)

Sport
- Sport: Judo

Ronny Sanabria (born 12 April 1964) is a Costa Rican judoka who lost on points after a first-round bye at the 1980 Summer Olympics and by ippon in 14 seconds at the 1984 Summer Olympics.
