= Luis López (runner) =

Costa Rican long-distance runner

Personal information
- Nationality: Costa Rican
- Born: 14 July 1949 (age 76)

Sport
- Sport: Long-distance running
- Event: Marathon

Luis López (born 14 July 1949) is a Costa Rican former long-distance runner. He competed in the men's marathon at the 1988 Summer Olympics and the 1992 Summer Olympics.
