= Karina Fernández =

Costa Rican triathlete

Personal information
- Born: June 22, 1978 (age 48) San José, Costa Rica

Sport
- Sport: Triathlon
Medal record
Representing Costa Rica
Central American and Caribbean Games
Bronze medal – third place	1998 Maracaibo	Women's team

Karina Lorena Fernández Madrigal (born June 22, 1978) is an athlete from Costa Rica. She competes in triathlon.

Madrigal competed at the first Olympic triathlon at the 2000 Summer Olympics. She did not finish the competition.
