= Minor Alpízar =

Costa Rican footballer (born 1953)

Personal information
- Full name: Minor Alpízar Campos
- Date of birth: 27 September 1953 (age 73)
- Place of birth: , Costa Rica
- Position: Defender

Senior career*
Years	Team	Apps	(Gls)
- Ramonense
1981	Herediano		

International career
1980–1985	Costa Rica		
- * Club domestic league appearances and goals

Minor Alpízar Campos (born 27 September 1953) is a former Costa Rican footballer.

== Club career ==
Alpízar played for Ramonense in the Primera Division de Costa Rica and won the 1981 league title with Herediano.

== International career ==
Alpízar made several appearances for the Costa Rica national football team, and was part of squads that played at the 1980 and 1984 Olympic Games held in Los Angeles.
