= Julián Muñoz (alpine skier) =

Costa Rican alpine skier (born 1946)

Personal information
- Nationality: Costa Rican
- Born: 11 July 1946 (age 78); San Francisco, California, U.S.

Sport
- Sport: Alpine skiing

Julián Muñoz (born 11 July 1946) is a Costa Rican-American alpine skier. He competed at the 1988 Winter Olympics and the 1992 Winter Olympics as a tourist athlete.

== Biography ==
Munoz was born in the US to Costa Rican parents, and graduated with a degree in architecture from University of California, Berkeley. He worked at the Costa Rican consulate in San Francisco.

=== Olympic career ===
Munoz's earliest involvement with the Olympics was guiding Costa Rican visitors at the 1984 Olympics in Los Angeles. Later, whilst on a business trip to Costa Rica, but never having lived there, he contacted amateur sports officials about potentially representing Costa Rica at the Winter Olympics. Until being accepted to attend the Olympics, Munoz had been a recreational skier. Munoz funded most of his costs for attending the Olympics, with Costa Rica only covering 1/5th of them. He represented Costa Rica again in 1992, and came last in all events.

He claimed he faced some hostility from top competitors, noting the tremendous gap that existed between them and small nation competitors such as himself. He hoped to compete again in 1994, but in 1994 the International Olympics Committee for the Winter Games introduced qualifying standards to address the issue of tourist athletes, which prevented him from entering.
