= María París =

Costa Rican swimmer (born 1961)

Personal information
- Born: 20 May 1961 (age 65) San José Costa Rica

Sport
- Sport: Swimming
Medal record
Representing Costa Rica
Central American and Caribbean Games
Gold medal – first place	1974 Santo Domingo	100m backstroke
Gold medal – first place	1974 Santo Domingo	200m backstroke
Gold medal – first place	1974 Santo Domingo	100m butterfly
Gold medal – first place	1978 Medellin	100m butterfly
Gold medal – first place	1978 Medellin	200m butterfly
Gold medal – first place	1982 Havana	100m butterfly
Gold medal – first place	1982 Havana	200m individual medley

María París (born 20 May 1961) is a Costa Rican former swimmer. She competed at the 1976 Summer Olympics and the 1980 Summer Olympics.
