= Alejandro Preinfalk =

Costa Rican alpine skier (born 1970)

Personal information
- Nationality: Costa Rican
- Born: 3 October 1970 (age 54)

Sport
- Sport: Alpine skiing

Alejandro Preinfalk (born 3 October 1970) is a Costa Rican alpine skier. He competed in two events at the 1992 Winter Olympics.
