= Henry Núñez =

Costa Rican judoka

Personal information
- Nationality: Costa Rican
- Born: 5 April 1969 (age 56)

Sport
- Sport: Judo

Henry Núñez (born 5 April 1969) is a Costa Rican former judoka. He competed at the 1988 Summer Olympics and the 1996 Summer Olympics.

In 2008, he became the president of the Costa Rican Olympic Committee.
