= Hugo Chamberlain =

Costa Rican sports shooter (1934–2023)

Personal information
- Born: 14 November 1934 San José, Costa Rica
- Died: 12 November 2023 (aged 88)

Sport
- Sport: Sports shooting

Hugo Chamberlain (14 November 1934 – 12 November 2023) was a Costa Rican sports shooter. He competed at the 1968, 1972 and 1976 Summer Olympics. He was the flag bearer for Costa Rica in the 1972 opening ceremony. Chamberlain died on 12 November 2023, two days shy of his 89th birthday.
