= José Luis Molina =

Costa Rican long-distance runner

Personal information
- Nationality: Costa Rican
- Born: 8 March 1965 (age 61)

Sport
- Sport: Long-distance running
- Event: Marathon

José Luis Molina Núñez (Note: In this name that follows Hispanic American naming customs, the first or paternal surname is Molina and the second or maternal family name is Núñez.) (born 8 March 1965) is a Costa Rican long-distance runner. He competed in the men's marathon at the 1996 Summer Olympics and the 2000 Summer Olympics where he ran 2:17.49 (24th place) and 2:20:37 (39th place), respectively. He took the Los Angeles Marathon title in 1996 with a winning time of 2:13:23.
