= Mariano Lara =

Costa Rican sports shooter

Personal information
- Born: 25 February 1951 (age 74); Alajuela, Costa Rica

Sport
- Sport: Sports shooting

Mariano Lara (born 25 February 1951) is a Costa Rican sports shooter. He competed at the 1980 Summer Olympics, the 1984 Summer Olympics and the 1988 Summer Olympics.
