= Arturo Kinch =

Costa Rican skier

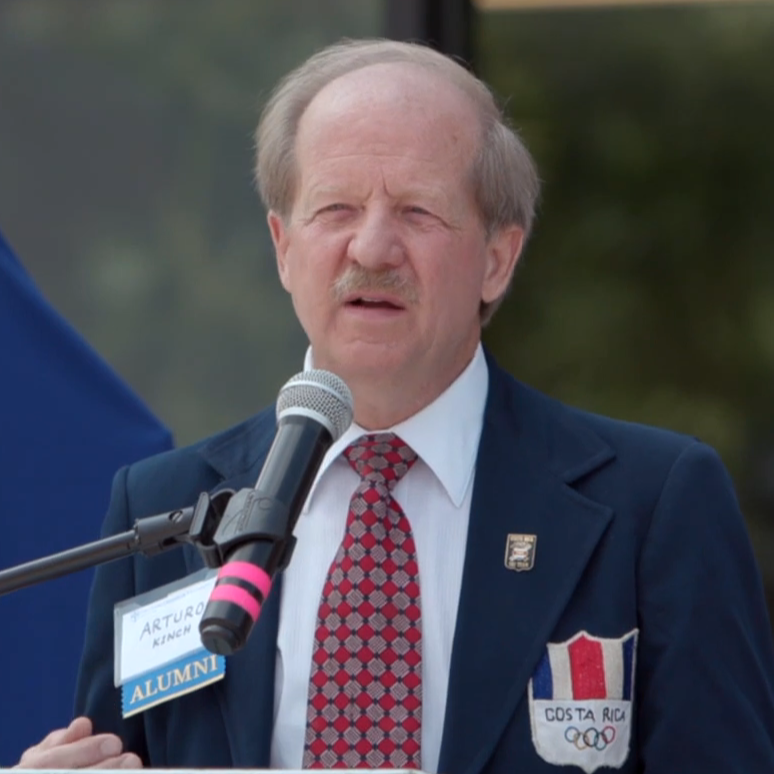
- Kinch in 2019

Personal information
- Nationality: Costa Rica
- Born: April 15, 1956 (age 70) San José, Costa Rica

Sport
- Sport: Skiing

Arturo Kinch (born 15 April 1956) is a Costa Rican–American alpine skier who represented Costa Rica in the 1980, 1984, 1988, 2002, and 2006 Winter Olympics. He served as Costa Rica's flagbearer at the Winter Olympic opening ceremonies.

== Biography ==
Born the seventh child in a family that would grow to a total of eleven and the son of missionary parents in Costa Rica, Kinch moved to the US and then enrolled at Rockmont College (now Colorado Christian University) in 1974 on a soccer scholarship. In college, Kinch played basketball to keep in shape but became a reserve player. He began participating in skiing, and he discovered his natural affinity for the sport. Kinch would score the most points on the ski team competitions, despite his inexperience, spurring coaches to encourage him to continue with the sport. He discovered that to be eligible for international competition, he had to belong to his nation's skiing association; as Costa Rica had no skiing association, he founded the Costa Rica Ski Association in 1978.

In the 1980 Winter Olympics Kinch competed as Costa Rica's first and only Olympic skier. He went on to represent Costa Rica in four more Olympic Games. He paid for his travels, training, and equipment by himself; he sold his stock options to afford a ticket to Italy just thirty minutes before boarding the plane in 2006. In 2004 Kinch was inducted into the Colorado Christian University's Hall of Fame. He competed in his final Olympic games, the 2006 Winter Olympics, at forty-nine years old.

Kinch did not participate in the 1992 or 1994 Winter Olympics because he stayed at home to prove to his wife that she mattered more to him than skiing. She did not agree and later divorced him. Kinch also worked as a customer service representative for United Airlines. He has one daughter and lives in Denver. In 2019, Kinch attended the ceremonial opening of a café on the campus of Colorado Christian University named "Arturo's" in his honor.

== See also ==
- Tropical nations at the Winter Olympics
