= Olympic Committee of Costa Rica =

National Olympic Committee

- Country: Costa Rica
- Code: CRC
- Created: 1953
- Recognized: 1954
- Continental Association: PASO
- President: Alexánder Zamora
- Secretary General: Silvia González

The Olympic Committee of Costa Rica (Spanish: Comité Olímpico de Costa Rica, IOC code: CRC) is the National Olympic Committee representing Costa Rica.

Although Costa Rica first competed at the Olympics in 1936, the Olympic Committee was not founded until 1953. The committee was formally recognized by the International Olympic Committee at a meeting held in Athens on 15 May 1954. The president of the Olympic Committee of Costa Rica is Alexánder Zamora, who succeeded Henry Núñez in 2021.
