= Costa Rica at the 2015 Pan American Games =

- IOC code: CRC
- NOC: Costa Rican Olympic Committee
- Website: concrc.org

in Toronto, Canada 10–26 July 2015
- Competitors: 77 in 24 sports
- Flag bearer (opening): Roberto Sawyers
- Flag bearer (closing): David Jimenez
- Medals Ranked =28th: Gold 0 Silver 0 Bronze 1 Total 1

Pan American Games appearances (overview)
- 1951; 1955; 1959; 1963; 1967; 1971; 1975; 1979; 1983; 1987; 1991; 1995; 1999; 2003; 2007; 2011; 2015; 2019; 2023; 2027

Costa Rica competed in the 2015 Pan American Games in Toronto, Ontario, Canada from July 10 to 26, 2015.

Track and field athlete Roberto Sawyers was named the flagbearer of the country at the opening ceremony.

== Competitors ==
The following table lists Costa Rica's delegation per sport and gender.

Sport	Men	Women	Total
Archery	0	1	1
Athletics	7	2	9
Beach volleyball	0	2	2
Bowling	2	2	4
Boxing	4	0	4
Canoeing	2	0	2
Cycling	1	6	8
Equestrian	1	2	3
Fencing	0	1	1
Football (soccer)	0	18	18
Golf	1	0	1
Gymnastics	1	0	1
Judo	0	1	1
Modern pentathlon	1	0	1
Racquetball	3	0	3
Roller sports	1	1	2
Shooting	1	0	1
Swimming	3	2	5
Synchronized swimming	0	2	2
Taekwondo	0	1	1
Tennis	1	0	1
Triathlon	1	1	2
Weightlifting	1	1	2
Wrestling	1	0	1
Total	32	45	77

== Medalists ==
The following competitors from Costa Rica won medals at the games. In the by discipline sections below, medalists' names are bolded.

Medal	Name	Sport	Event	Date
Bronze	David Jimenez	Boxing	Men's Flyweight	July 23

**Medals by sport**
**Sport**	1st place, gold medalist(s)	2nd place, silver medalist(s)	3rd place, bronze medalist(s)	**Total**
Athletics	0	0	1	1
**Total**	**0**	**0**	**1**	**1**

**Medals by day**
**Day**	1st place, gold medalist(s)	2nd place, silver medalist(s)	3rd place, bronze medalist(s)	**Total**
July 23	0	0	1	1
**Total**	**0**	**0**	**1**	**1**

== Archery ==
Costa Rica qualified one female archer based on its performance at the 2014 Pan American Championships.

Women

Athlete	Event	Ranking Round		Round of 32	Round of 16	Quarterfinals	Semifinals	Final / BM	Rank
Athlete	Event	Score	Seed	Opposition Score	Opposition Score	Opposition Score	Opposition Score	Opposition Score	Rank
Gloriana Bermudez Moreno	Individual	579	26th	L Brito (VEN); **L** 2–6	Did not advance				

== Athletics ==
Costa Rica qualified nine athletes (seven men and two women).

Key

- Note – Ranks given for track events are for the entire round
- **Q** = Qualified for the next round
- **q** = Qualified for the next round as a fastest loser or, in field events, by position without achieving the qualifying target
- **NR** = National record
- **PB** = Personal best
- **SB** = Seasonal best
- NM = No mark
- N/A = Round not applicable for the event

Men
Track

Athlete	Event	Round 1		Semifinal		Final	
Athlete	Event	Result	Rank	Result	Rank	Result	Rank
Gary Robinson	200 m	21.28	26	Did not advance			
Nery Brenes	400 m	—N/a		45.85	3 **Q**	44.85 **SB**	4
Georman Rivas	1500 m	—N/a				3:51.46 **PB**	12
Alvaro Sanabria	10,000 m	—N/a				31:41.77	11
Gerald Drummond	400 m hurdles	—N/a		53.47	21	Did not advance	
Nery Brenes; Gary Robinson; Gerald Drummond; Jarlex Lynch Allen	4 × 400 metres relay	—N/a		3:05.11 **NR**	8 **q**	3:05.21	8

Field

Athlete	Event	Final	
Athlete	Event	Distance	Rank
Roberto Sawyers	hammer throw	70.95	7

Women
Track

Athlete	Event	Round 1		Semifinal		Final	
Athlete	Event	Result	Rank	Result	Rank	Result	Rank
Sharolyn Josephs	100 m	11.46	20	Did not advance			
Sharolyn Josephs	200 m	23.70 **NR**	18	Did not advance			
Sharolyn Scott	400 metres hurdles	—N/a		58.30 **SB**	8 **Q**	58.65	7

== Beach volleyball ==
Costa Rica qualified a women's pair for a total of two athletes.

Athlete	Event	Preliminary round			Elimination round	Quarterfinals	5th to 8th place	7th place	
Athlete	Event	Opposition Score	Opposition Score	Opposition Score	Opposition Score	Opposition Score	Opposition Score	Opposition Score	Rank
Nathalia Alfaro; Karen Cope	Women's	Mardones – Rivas (CHI); **W** 2–1 (16–21, 21–14, 15–11)	Machado – Rodríguez (NIC); **W** 2–0 (21–15, 21–9)	Maestrini – Horta (BRA); **L** 1–2 (11–21, 21–18, 6–15)	Candelas – Revuelta (MEX); **W** 2–0 (21–18, 21–11)	Humana-Paredes – Pischke (CAN); **L** 0–2 (12–21, 12–21)	Galindo – Galindo (COL); **L** 1–2 (13–21, 21–19, 12–15)	Gómez – Nieto (URU); **L** 0–2 (15–21, 12–21)	8

== Boxing ==
Costa Rica qualified four male boxers.

Men

Athlete	Event	Preliminaries	Quarterfinals	Semifinals	Final	Rank
Athlete	Event	Opposition Result	Opposition Result	Opposition Result	Opposition Result	Rank
**David Jimenez**	Flyweight	Bye	Huitzil (MEX); **W** 3–0	Vargas (USA); **L** 1–2	Did not advance	3rd place, bronze medalist(s)
Eduardo Sanchez Ramirez	Light welterweight	Romero (GUA); **W** 2–1	Arcon (VEN); **L** 0–3	Did not advance		5
Jason Ramírez	Middleweight	Drolet (CAN); **W** 2–1	López (CUB); **L** 0–3	Did not advance		5
Jose Moya Hernandez	Light heavyweight	Bye	Romero (MEX); **L** 0–3	Did not advance		5

== Canoeing ==
Slalom

Costa Rica qualified the following boats:

Athlete(s)	Event	Preliminary						Semifinal		Final	
Athlete(s)	Event	Run 1	Rank	Run 2	Rank	Best	Rank	Time	Rank	Time	Rank
Luis Mendez Rojas	Men's C-1	DNF	8	213.67	8	213.67	8	274.88	8	Did not advance	
Arnaldo Cespedes Perez	Men's K-1	166.17	8	101.14	5	101.14	5	116.42	6	106.98	5

== Cycling ==
Costa Rica qualified seven cyclists (one man and six women).

=== Mountain biking ===
Athlete	Event	Time	Rank
Andrey Fonseca	Men's cross-country	1:37:56	8
Adriana Rojas	Women's cross-country	1:45:20	12

=== Road ===
Women

Athlete	Event	Final	
Athlete	Event	Time	Rank
Edith Guillén	Road race	2:07:53	17
Milagro Mena Solano	Road race	2:07:55	26
María Vargas	Road race	2:07:55	33

=== Track ===
Team pursuit

Athlete	Event	Qualification		First round		Final	
Athlete	Event	Time	Rank	Opponent Time	Rank	Opponent Time	Rank
Edith Guillén; Paula Herrera Hernandez; Marcela Rubiano; Maria Vargas Barrientos	Women's team pursuit	5:07.156	8	Did not advance			8

Omnium

Athlete	Event	Scratch race		Individual pursuit		Elimination race		Time trial		Flying lap		Points race		Total points	Rank
Athlete	Event	Rank	Points	Rank	Points	Rank	Points	Rank	Points	Rank	Points	Rank	Points	Total points	Rank
Marcela Rubiano	Women's omnium	12	-40	12	18	10	22	12	18	12	18	DNS	0	DNF	

== Equestrian ==
Costa Rica qualified a full dressage team of four athletes, however only 3 were selected to compete.

=== Dressage ===
Athlete	Horse	Event	Round 1		Round 2			Final			
Athlete	Horse	Event	Score	Rank	Score	Rank	Total	Score	Rank	Total	Rank
Anne Egerstrom	Amorino	Individual	66.053	25	63.552	28	129.605	—N/a		Did not advance	
Christer Egerstrom	Bello Oriente	Individual	66.790	22	66.658	23 **Q**	133.448	—N/a		68.675	20
Michelle Batalla Navarro	Vivi Light	Individual	61.868	35	62.026	33	123.894	—N/a		Did not advance	
Anne Egerstrom; Christer Egerstrom; Michelle Batalla Navarro	See above	Team	194.711	9	—N/a			192.236	9	386.947	9

== Fencing ==
Costa Rica qualified 1 fencer (1 woman).

Athlete	Event	Pool Round		Round of 16	Quarterfinals	Semifinals	Final	
Athlete	Event	Victories	Seed	Opposition Score	Opposition Score	Opposition Score	Opposition Score	Rank
Dirley Yepes	Women's Épée	2	9	Violeta Ramírez Peguero (DOM); **L** 12–15	Did not advance			

== Football ==
Costa Rica's women's football team (of 18 athletes) qualified to compete at the games after winning the Central American qualifying tournament.

=== Women's tournament ===
Roster

Head coach: (Costa Rica) Amelia Valverde

The following players are on the roster for the 2015 Pan American Games.

No.	Pos.	Player	Date of birth (age)	Caps	Goals	Club
1	GK	Dinnia Díaz	14 January 1988 (aged 27)	21	0	(Costa Rican Football Federation) UD Moravia
18	GK	Yirlania Arroyo	28 May 1986 (aged 29)	40	0	(United States Soccer Federation) Sky Blue FC
5	DF	Diana Sáenz	15 April 1989 (aged 26)	48	0	(United States Soccer Federation) Univ. of South Florida
6	DF	Carol Sánchez	16 April 1986 (aged 29)	33	2	(Costa Rican Football Federation) UD Moravia
7	FW	Melissa Herrera	10 October 1996 (aged 18)	20	12	(Costa Rican Football Federation) Deportivo Saprissa
10	MF	Shirley Cruz (c)	28 August 1985 (aged 29)	60	21	(French Football Federation) Paris Saint-Germain
11	FW	Raquel Rodríguez	28 October 1993 (aged 21)	37	24	(United States Soccer Federation) Pennsylvania State Univ.
12	DF	Lixy Rodríguez	4 November 1990 (aged 24)	47	2	(Costa Rican Football Federation) L.D. Alajuelense
14	FW	Fernanda Barrantes	12 April 1989 (aged 26)	23	21	(Costa Rican Football Federation) UD Moravia
15	MF	Cristín Granados	19 August 1989 (aged 25)	53	10	(Costa Rican Football Federation) Deportivo Saprissa
16	MF	Katherine Alvarado	11 April 1991 (aged 24)	47	18	(Costa Rican Football Federation) Deportivo Saprissa
20	FW	Wendy Acosta	19 December 1989 (aged 25)	38	18	(Costa Rican Football Federation) UD Moravia
3	MF	Gloriana Villalobos	20 August 1999 (aged 15)	12	2	(Costa Rican Football Federation) Deportivo Saprissa
4	DF	Mariana Benavides	26 December 1994 (aged 20)	12	4	(Costa Rican Football Federation) C.S. Herediano
8	DF	Daniela Cruz	8 March 1991 (aged 24)	33	6	(Costa Rican Football Federation) Deportivo Saprissa
9	FW	Carolina Venegas	28 October 1991 (aged 23)	35	15	(Costa Rican Football Federation) Deportivo Saprissa
17	FW	Karla Villalobos	16 July 1989 (aged 25)	9	6	(Costa Rican Football Federation) C.S. Herediano
19	DF	Fabiola Sánchez	9 April 1993 (aged 22)	10	3	(United States Soccer Federation) Martin Methodist Redhawks

Group B

Pos	Team	Pld	W	D	L	GF	GA	GD	Pts	Qualification
1	Brazil	3	3	0	0	12	1	+11	**9**	Medal round
2	Canada (H)	3	1	0	2	5	6	−1	**3**	Medal round
3	Costa Rica	3	1	0	2	2	5	−3	**3**	
4	Ecuador	3	1	0	2	5	12	−7	**3**	

Source: Toronto 2015
(H) Hosts
July 11, 2015
18:05

Costa Rica	0–3	Brazil
	Report	Raquel 14'; Thaisa 34'; Formiga 90'

Hamilton Pan Am Soccer Stadium, Hamilton
Referee: Katja Koroleva (United States)

July 15, 2015
20:35

Costa Rica	2–0	Canada
Cruz 60'; Villalobos 74'	Report

Hamilton Pan Am Soccer Stadium, Hamilton
Referee: Tatiana Guzman (Nicaragua)

July 19, 2015
17:35

Ecuador	2–0	Costa Rica
Real 10', 90+1'	Report

Hamilton Pan Am Soccer Stadium, Hamilton
Referee: Cardella Samuels (Jamaica)

2015 Pan American Games 5th

**Costa Rica**

== Golf ==
Costa Rica qualified one male golfer.

Men

Athlete	Event	Final						
Athlete	Event	Round 1	Round 2	Round 3	Round 4	Total	To Par	Rank
José Méndez	Individual	78	87	78	73	316	+28	=31

== Gymnastics ==
=== Artistic ===
Costa Rica qualified one male gymnast.

Men
Individual Qualification

Athlete	Event	Qualification								Final							
Athlete	Event	Apparatus						Total	Rank	Apparatus						Total	Rank
Athlete	Event	F	PH	R	V	PB	HB	Total	Rank	F	PH	R	V	PB	HB	Total	Rank
Tarik Soto Byfield	Qualification	12.700	12.900	12.800	14.600	12.000	11.700	76.700	22 **Q**	13.700	13.250	11.900	14.750	13.300	13.650	80.550	13

Qualification Legend: Q = Qualified to apparatus final

== Judo ==
Costa Rica qualified one woman judoka.

Women

Athlete	Event	Quarterfinals	Semifinals	Repechage	Final / BM	
Athlete	Event	Opposition Result	Opposition Result	Opposition Result	Opposition Result	Rank
Kenia Rodríguez	+78 kg	Idalys Ortiz (CUB); **L** 0001–1000	Did not advance	Leidi German (DOM); **L** 0003–0000	Did not advance	=7

== Modern pentathlon ==
Costa Rica qualified 1 male athlete.

Men

Athlete	Event	Fencing (Épée One Touch)			Swimming (200m Freestyle)			Riding (Show Jumping)			Shooting/Running (10 m Air Pistol/3000m)			Total Points	Final Rank
Athlete	Event	Results	Rank	MP points	Time	Rank	MP points	Penalties	Rank	MP points	Time	Rank	MP points	Total Points	Final Rank
Fabián Ramírez	Men's	9	162	=24	2:15.51	294	21	37	263	19	15:06.52	394	24	1114	20

== Racquetball ==
Costa Rica qualified a team of three men.

== Roller sports ==
Costa Rica qualified two athletes (one male and one female) in the speed competitions. Originally the country had qualified two female athletes in the speed events, but ultimately it chose to only send one.

=== Speed ===
Athlete	Event	Semifinal		Final	
Athlete	Event	Time	Rank	Time/Points	Rank
Carlos Montoya	Men's 200 m time trial	—N/a		17.621	9
Carlos Montoya	Men's 500 m	39.635	5	Did not advance	
Carlos Montoya	Men's 10,000 m points race	—N/a		4	6
Jennifer Monterrey	Women's 200 m time trial	—N/a		19.848	9
Jennifer Monterrey	Women's 500 m	44.664	5	Did not advance	
Jennifer Monterrey	Women's 10,000 m points race	—N/a		Did not start	

== Shooting ==
Costa Rica received a wildcard to enter one male shooter.

Men

Athlete	Event	Qualification		Final	
Athlete	Event	Points	Rank	Points	Rank
Roberto Chamberlain	50 metre rifle prone	611.5	17	Did not advance	

== Swimming ==
Costa Rica qualified five swimmers (3 male and 2 female).

Key

- Note – Ranks given are for the entire round
- **FB** = Qualified for the B Final
- **DNS** = Did not start

Men

Athlete	Event	Heat		Final	
Athlete	Event	Time	Rank	Time	Rank
Esteban Araya	200 metre breaststroke	2:24.88	19	Did not qualify	
Esteban Araya	200 metre individual medley	2:09.14	17	Did not qualify	
Esteban Araya	400 metre individual medley	4:31.52	15 **FB**	4:33.80	16
Rodolfo Sanchez Perez	10 km open water	—N/a		2:13:47.5	15
Cristopher Segura	10 km open water	—N/a		2:11:42.5	14

Women

Athlete	Event	Heat		Final	
Athlete	Event	Time	Rank	Time	Rank
Marie Meza	50 metre freestyle	26.74	19	Did not qualify	
Marie Meza	100 metre freestyle	58.89	22	Did not qualify	
Marie Meza	100 metre butterfly	1:01.01	9 **FB**	DNS	
Maria Astorga Perez	10 km open water	—N/a		2:21:40.8	16

== Synchronized swimming ==
Costa Rica qualified a duet of two athletes.

Athlete	Event	Technical Routine		Free Routine (Final)			
Athlete	Event	Points	Rank	Points	Rank	Total points	Rank
Fiorella Calvo; Natalia Jenkis	Women's duet	67.5680	10	70.2333	10th	137.1813	10

== Taekwondo ==
Costa Rica qualified a team of one female athlete.

Athlete	Event	Round of 16	Quarterfinals	Semifinals	Repechage	Bronze medal	Final	
Athlete	Event	Opposition Result	Opposition Result	Opposition Result	Opposition Result	Opposition Result	Opposition Result	Rank
Katherine Alvarado	Women's -67kg	Yosselyn Molina (HON); **W** 5–1	Katherine Dumar (COL); **W** 8–2	Victoria Heredia (MEX); **L** 2–3	—N/a	Daima Villalon (CUB); **L** 3–9	Did not advance	5

== Tennis ==
Costa Rica qualified one athlete in the men's singles event.

Men

Athlete	Event	First round	Round of 32	Round of 16	Quarterfinals	Semifinals	Final / BM	
Athlete	Event	Opposition Score	Opposition Score	Opposition Score	Opposition Score	Opposition Score	Opposition Score	Rank
Julian Saborio	Singles	Turcios (HON); **W** (6–3, 7–5)	Barrientos (COL); **L** (6–4, 2–6, 2–6)	Did not advance				

== Triathlon ==
Costa Rica qualified two triathletes, one per gender.

Athlete	Event	Total	Rank
Leonardo Chacón	Men's individual	1:49:52	9
Alia Cardinale	Women's individual	2:03:06	16

== Weightlifting ==
Costa Rica qualified a team of 2 athletes (1 man and 1 woman).

Athlete	Event	Snatch		Clean & jerk		Total	Rank
Athlete	Event	Result	Rank	Result	Rank	Total	Rank
Christopher Linton	Men's 94 kg	127	11	167	11	294	11
Daysi Hutchinson	Women's 75 kg	90	6	110	6	200	6

== Wrestling ==
Costa Rica received one wildcard.

Men's freestyle

Athlete	Event	Preliminaries	Quarterfinals	Semifinals	Repechage	Bronze medal match	Final
Athlete	Event	Opposition Result	Opposition Result	Opposition Result	Opposition Result	Opposition Result	Opposition Result
Johnathan Scott	74 kg	Bye	Blanco (ECU); **L** 0–10	Did not advance	Bye	Sarco (VEN); **L** 0–10	Did not advance

== See also ==
- Costa Rica at the 2016 Summer Olympics
