= Costa Rica at the 2019 Pan American Games =

- IOC code: CRC
- NOC: Costa Rican Olympic Committee
- Website: www.concrc.org

in Lima, Peru 26 July–11 August 2019
- Competitors: 85 in 24 sports
- Flag bearer: Shirley Cruz (opening)
- Medals Ranked 21st: Gold 1 Silver 0 Bronze 4 Total 5

Pan American Games appearances (overview)
- 1951; 1955; 1959; 1963; 1967; 1971; 1975; 1979; 1983; 1987; 1991; 1995; 1999; 2003; 2007; 2011; 2015; 2019; 2023; 2027

Costa Rica competed in the 2019 Pan American Games in Lima, Peru from July 26 to August 11, 2019.

On 11 July 2019, the Costa Rican Olympic Committee officially named a team of 85 athletes (44 women and 41 men) competing in 24 sports.

During the opening ceremony of the games, footballer Shirley Cruz carried the flag of the country as part of the parade of nations.

At this edition of the games, Costa Rica won five medals, the second best performance for the country at a single edition of the games (the best performance being the 11 medals won in 1987).

== Competitors ==
The following is the list of number of competitors (per gender) participating at the games per sport/discipline.

Sport	Men	Women	Total
Athletics (track and field)	4	4	8
Badminton	1	1	2
Bodybuilding	1	0	1
Bowling	2	2	4
Boxing	1	1	2
Canoeing	1	0	1
Cycling	5	2	7
Equestrian	2	0	2
Fencing	0	1	1
Football	0	18	18
Golf	2	0	2
Gymnastics	2	2	4
Judo	0	1	1
Karate	1	3	4
Racquetball	2	1	3
Roller sports	2	0	2
Shooting	2	0	2
Surfing	3	1	4
Swimming	3	1	4
Taekwondo	2	2	4
Triathlon	0	1	1
Volleyball	2	2	4
Weightlifting	2	1	3
Wrestling	1	0	1
Total	41	44	85

== Medalists ==
The following competitors from Costa Rica won medals at the games. In the by discipline sections below, medalists' names are bolded.

Medal	Name	Sport	Event	Date
Gold	Andrea Vargas	Athletics	Women's 100m hurdles	August 8
Bronze	Nishy Lee Lindo	Taekwondo	Women's 57 kg	July 28
Bronze	Andres Acuña; Felipe Camacho	Racquetball	Men's doubles	August 6
Bronze	Costa Rica women's national football team: Noelia Bermúdez; Priscilla Tapia; Lixy Rodríguez; Carol Sánchez; Daniela Cruz; Fabiola Sánchez; Gabriela Guillén; María Paula Elizondo; Stephannie Blanco; Valeria del Campo; Shirley Cruz; Katherine Alvarado; Raquel Rodríguez; Gloriana Villalobos; Sofía Varela; Mariana Benavides; Priscila Chinchilla; María Paula Salas	Football	Women's tournament	August 9
Bronze	Diana Brenes	Judo	Women's 78 kg	August 11

**Medals by sport**
**Sport**	1st place, gold medalist(s)	2nd place, silver medalist(s)	3rd place, bronze medalist(s)	**Total**
Athletics	1	0	0	1
Football	0	0	1	1
Judo	0	0	1	1
Racquetball	0	0	1	1
Taekwondo	0	0	1	1
**Total**	**1**	**0**	**4**	**5**

== Athletics (track and field) ==
Costa Rica qualified eight athletes (four men and four women).

Key

- Note–Ranks given for track events are for the entire round
- Q = Qualified for the next round directly

Men
Track events

Athlete	Event	Semifinal		Final	
Athlete	Event	Result	Rank	Result	Rank
Hector Allen	200 m	21.79	15	Did not advance	
Nery Brenes	400 m	47.48	15	Did not advance	
Gerald Drummond	400 m hurdles	50.35	9	Did not advance	

Field event

Athlete	Event	Final	
Athlete	Event	Distance	Rank
Roberto Sawyers	Hammer throw	70.25	9

Women
Track and Road Events

Athlete	Event	Semifinal		Final	
Athlete	Event	Result	Rank	Result	Rank
Andrea Vargas	100 m hurdles	12.75	1 Q	12.82	1st place, gold medalist(s)
Noelia Vargas	20 km walk	—N/a		1:33:09	6
Gabriela Traña	Marathon	—N/a		2:49:28	12
Yenny Mendez	Marathon	—N/a		2:56:31	14

== Badminton ==
Costa Rica qualified a team of two badminton athletes (one per gender).

Athlete	Event	Round of 64	Round of 32	Round of 16	Quarterfinals	Semifinals	Final	Rank
Athlete	Event	Opposition Result	Opposition Result	Opposition Result	Opposition Result	Opposition Result	Opposition Result	Rank
Gianpiero Cavallotti	Men's singles	Bye	Iván León (CHI); L 12–21, 15–21	Did not advance				
Lauren Villalobos	Women's singles	Bye	Ramdhani (GUY); W 21–15, 21–18	Michelle Li (CAN); L 7–21, 13–21	Did not advance			
Gianpiero Cavallotti; Lauren Villalobos	Mixed doubles	—N/a	Thorpe / Williams (BAR); L 13–21, 10–21	Did not advance				

== Bodybuilding ==
Costa Rica qualified one male bodybuilder.

Men

Athlete	Event	Prejudging		Final	
Athlete	Event	Result	Rank	Result	Rank
Evaristo Cortes	Classic bodybuilding	—N/a		Did not advance	

- No results were provided for the prejudging round, with only the top six advancing.

== Bowling ==
Athlete	Event	Qualification / Final														Round robin											Semifinal	Final	
Athlete	Event	Block 1						Block 2						Total	Rank	Round robin											Semifinal	Final	
Athlete	Event	1	2	3	4	5	6	7	8	9	10	11	12	Total	Rank	1	2	3	4	5	6	7	8	Total	Grand total	Rank	Opposition Result	Opposition Result	Rank
Marco Moretti	Men's singles	194	225	209	208	190	273	214	180	247	236	245	235	2656	9	Did not advance													
Jonaykel Conejo	Men's singles	212	215	151	269	245	191	277	230	278	160	224	164	2616	13	Did not advance													
Marco Moretti; Jonaykel Conejo	Men's doubles	477	449	353	439	442	436	525	484	486	375	534	349	5349	5	—N/a													
Ericka Quesada	Women's singles	258	204	166	201	167	146	216	214	194	251	142	204	2363	19	Did not advance													
Viviana Delgado	Women's singles	192	224	152	172	165	188	242	154	184	203	213	202	2291	23	Did not advance													
Ericka Quesada; Viviana Delgado	Women's doubles	362	332	423	391	383	385	413	399	352	454	403	425	4722	10	—N/a													

== Boxing ==
Costa Rica qualified two boxers (one man and one woman).

Athlete	Event	Quarterfinals	Semifinals	Final	Rank
Athlete	Event	Opposition Result	Opposition Result	Opposition Result	Rank
Eduardo Sanchéz	Men's 64 kg	Michael Alexander (TTO); L 1–3	Did not advance		
Valeria Cárdenas	Women's 51 kg	Virginia Fuchs (USA); L 0–5	Did not advance		

== Canoeing ==
=== Slalom ===
Costa Rica qualified one male slalom athlete.

Key

- Note–Ranks given are within the heat

Men

Athlete(s)	Event	Heat						Semifinal		Final	
Athlete(s)	Event	Run 1	Rank	Run 2	Rank	Best	Rank	Time	Rank	Time	Rank
Axel Fonseca	K-1	91.66	6	90.11	7 Q	90.11	7	97.46	6	92.33	5
Axel Fonseca	Extreme K-1	—N/a	1 Q	—N/a					3	Did not advance	

== Cycling ==
Costa Rica qualified seven cyclists (five men and two women).

=== BMX ===
Men
Freestyle

Athlete	Event	Seeding				Final			
Athlete	Event	Run 1	Run 2	Average	Rank	Run 1	Run 2	Best	Rank
Kenneth Tencio	BMX freestyle	80.00	79.17	79.58	4	77.00	62.00	77.00	5

Racing

Athlete	Event	Time trial		Quarterfinal		Semifinal		Final	
Athlete	Event	Result	Rank	Points	Rank	Time	Rank	Time	Rank
Maikol Cordero	BMX racing	38.927	22	18	6	Did not advance			

=== Mountain biking ===
Athlete	Event	Final	
Athlete	Event	Time	Rank
Andrey Fonseca	Men's cross-country	1:31:00	7
Carlos Herrera	Men's cross-country	1:34:40	13
Milagro Mena	Women's cross-country	1:35:47	8
Adriana Rojas	Women's cross-country	1:37:25	9

=== Road cycling ===
Men

Athlete	Event	Final	
Athlete	Event	Time	Rank
Pablo Mudarra	Road race	4:09:02	14
Pablo Mudarra	Time trial	52:29.47	19

== Equestrian ==
Costa Rica qualified two equestrians.

=== Dressage ===
Athlete	Horse	Event	Qualification						Grand Prix Freestyle / Intermediate I Freestyle	
Athlete	Horse	Event	Grand Prix / Prix St. Georges		Grand Prix Special / Intermediate I		Total		Grand Prix Freestyle / Intermediate I Freestyle	
Athlete	Horse	Event	Score	Rank	Score	Rank	Score	Rank	Score	Rank
Christer Egerstrom	Bello Oriente	Individual	66.647	16	68.676	10	135.323	12 Q	72.365	10
Ronald Masis	Zar AG	Individual	63.529	31	64.147	25	127.676	27	Did not advance	

== Fencing ==
Costa Rica qualified a 1 female fencer in the épée discipline.

Women

Athlete	Event	Pool Round		Round of 16	Quarterfinals	Semifinals	Final	
Athlete	Event	Victories	Seed	Opposition Score	Opposition Score	Opposition Score	Opposition Score	Rank
Karina Dyner	Foil	0	18	Did not advance				

== Football ==
Costa Rica qualified a women's team (of 18 athletes).

=== Women's tournament ===
Roster

The following players were called up for the 2019 Pan American Games.

Head coach: Amelia Valverde

No.	Pos.	Player	Date of birth (age)	Caps	Goals	Club
1	GK	Noelia Bermúdez	20 September 1994 (aged 24)	12	0	(Costa Rican Football Federation) Saprissa
18	GK	Priscilla Tapia	2 May 1991 (aged 28)	2	0	(Costa Rican Football Federation) AD Moravia
12	DF	Lixy Rodríguez	4 November 1990 (aged 28)	63	2	(Royal Spanish Football Federation) Tacón
6	DF	Carol Sánchez	16 April 1986 (aged 33)	45	2	(Costa Rican Football Federation) AD Moravia
8	DF	Daniela Cruz	8 March 1991 (aged 28)	38	6	(Royal Spanish Football Federation) Espanyol
5	DF	Fabiola Sánchez	9 April 1993 (aged 26)	16	3	(Costa Rican Football Federation) Codea
2	DF	Gabriela Guillén	1 March 1992 (aged 27)	11	0	(Costa Rican Football Federation) Saprissa
3	DF	María Paula Elizondo	30 November 1998 (aged 20)	4	0	(Costa Rican Football Federation) Saprissa
15	DF	Stephannie Blanco	13 December 2000 (aged 18)	0	0	(Costa Rican Football Federation) Arenal Coronado
7	MF	Valeria del Campo	15 February 2000 (aged 19)	0	0	(Costa Rican Football Federation) Saprissa
10	MF	Shirley Cruz (c)	28 August 1985 (aged 33)	73	24	(Chinese Football Association) Jiangsu Suning
16	MF	Katherine Alvarado	11 April 1991 (aged 28)	66	20	(Royal Spanish Football Federation) Espanyol
11	MF	Raquel Rodríguez	28 October 1993 (aged 25)	49	31	(United States Soccer Federation) Sky Blue FC
9	MF	Gloriana Villalobos	20 August 1999 (aged 19)	24	2	(United States Soccer Federation) Florida State Seminoles
4	MF	Mariana Benavides	26 December 1994 (aged 24)	22	4	(Costa Rican Football Federation) Arenal Coronado
14	MF	Priscila Chinchilla	11 July 2001 (aged 18)	6	2	(Costa Rican Football Federation) Codea
17	FW	María Paula Salas	12 July 2002 (aged 17)	9	2	(Costa Rican Football Federation) Saprissa
13	FW	Sofía Varela	28 March 1998 (aged 21)	0	0	(Costa Rican Football Federation) Saprissa

Pos	Team	Pld	W	D	L	GF	GA	GD	Pts	Qualification
1	Costa Rica	3	2	1	0	6	2	+4	7	Knockout stage
2	Argentina	3	2	1	0	4	0	+4	7	Knockout stage
3	Panama	3	0	1	2	2	5	−3	1	Fifth place match
4	Peru (H)	3	0	1	2	2	7	−5	1	Seventh place match

Source: Lima 2019
Rules for classification: Tie-breakers
(H) Hosts
28 July 2019
17:30

Panama	1–3	Costa Rica
Mills 14'	Report	Chinchilla 73', 85'; Blanco 79'

Estadio Universidad San Marcos
Referee: Susana Corella (Ecuador)

31 July 2019
20:30

Costa Rica	3–1	Peru
R. Rodríguez 55', 90+3'; C. Sánchez 84'	Report	Otiniano 14'

Estadio Universidad San Marcos
Referee: Adriana Farfán (Bolivia)

3 August 2019
17:30

Costa Rica	0–0	Argentina
	Report

Estadio Universidad San Marcos
Referee: Silvia Ríos (Uruguay)

Semifinals

6 August 2019
20:30

Costa Rica	3–4 (a.e.t.)	Colombia
C. Sánchez 59', 87'; Salas 89'	Report	Santos 30'; Gaitán 33'; Ospina 68'; Usme 93'

Estadio Universidad San Marcos
Referee: Deborah Cruz (Brazil)

Bronze medal match

9 August 2019
17:30

Paraguay	0–1	Costa Rica (bronze)
	Report	D. Cruz 82'

Estadio Universidad San Marcos
Referee: Silvia Ríos (Uruguay)

== Golf ==
Costa Rica qualified two male golfers.

Men

Athlete(s)	Event	Final						
Athlete(s)	Event	Round 1	Round 2	Round 3	Round 4	Total	To par	Rank
Paul Chaplet	Individual	71	74	75	74	294	+10	=27
José Méndez	Individual	77	72	71	74	294	+10	=27

== Gymnastics ==
Costa Rica qualified four artistic gymnasts (two men and two women).

=== Artistic ===
Men

Athlete	Event	Qualification						Total	Rank	Final						Total	Rank
Athlete	Event	F	PH	R	V	PB	HB	Total	Rank	F	PH	R	V	PB	HB	Total	Rank
Francisco Acuña	Individual all-around	11.900	10.950	12.050	13.250	12.550	11.650	72.350	27 Q	11.000	10.200	12.100	13.350	12.450	11.500	70.600	23
Francisco Ulate	Individual all-around	12.150	11.200	12.350	12.550	11.750	11.800	71.800	28 Q	11.850	10.050	11.350	12.700	11.600	12.500	70.050	24

Women
Individual Qualification

Athlete	Event	Qualification				Total	Rank	Final				Total	Rank
Athlete	Event	V	UB	BB	F	Total	Rank	V	UB	BB	F	Total	Rank
Luciana Alvarado	Individual all-around	13.350	11.350	12.150	11.950	48.800	19 Q	13.250	11.350	12.450	11.400	48.450	13
Heika del Sol Salas	Individual all-around	11.750	12.700	10.900	11.850	47.200	26 Q	12.350	12.350	10.200	11.400	46.300	19

== Judo ==
Costa Rica qualified one female judoka.

Women

Athlete	Event	Preliminaries	Quarterfinals	Semifinals	Repechage	Final / BM	
Athlete	Event	Opposition Result	Opposition Result	Opposition Result	Opposition Result	Opposition Result	Rank
Diana Brenes	78 kg	Coulombe (CAN); W 11S1–01S3	Antomarchi (CUB); L 00S2–01S2	Did not advance	Cantero (ARG); W 10–00S2	León (VEN); W 10–00S3	3rd place, bronze medalist(s)

== Karate ==
Costa Rica qualified four athletes in the kata discipline (one man and three women).

Kata

Athlete	Event	Round robin		Final / BM	
Athlete	Event	Points	Rank	Opposition Result	Rank
Roy Gatjens	Men's individual kata	23.12	4	Did not advance	
Fiorella Carballo; Mariana Sanchez; Kylie Solis	Women's team kata	Did not start			

== Racquetball ==
Costa Rica qualified three racquetball athletes (two men and one woman).

Athlete	Event	Qualifying Round robin				Round of 16	Quarterfinals	Semifinals	Final	Rank
Athlete	Event	Match 1	Match 2	Match 3	Rank	Opposition Result	Opposition Result	Opposition Result	Opposition Result	Rank
Andres Acuña	Men's singles	Moscoso (BOL); L 1–2	Ugalde (ECU); W 2–1	—N/a	3	Did not advance				
Felipe Camacho	Men's singles	Rios (ECU); W 2–1	Beltrán (MEX); L 0–2	—N/a	2 Q	Mercado (COL); L 0–2	Did not advance			
Andres Acuña; Felipe Camacho	Men's doubles	Mar / Montoya (MEX); L 0–2	Chacón / Moyet (CUB); W 2–0	Pérez / León (DOM); W 2–0	2 Q	Bye	Galicia / Salvatierra (GUA); W 2–0	Keller / Moscoso (BOL); L 0–2	Did not advance	3rd place, bronze medalist(s)
Andres Acuña; Felipe Camacho	Men's team	—N/a				Argentina; W 2–0	United States; L 0–2	Did not advance		
Maricruz Ortiz	Women's singles	Saunders (CAN); W 2–1	Muñoz (ECU); L 0–2	Lawrence (USA); L 0–2	3	Did not advance				

== Roller sports ==
Costa Rica qualified two men in the speed discipline.

=== Speed ===
Men

Athlete	Event	Heat		Semifinal		Final	
Athlete	Event	Time	Rank	Time	Rank	Time/Points	Rank
Bayron Siles	300 m time trial	—N/a				26.489	9
Bayron Siles	500 m	44.495	2 Q	44.388	3	Did not advance	
Carlos Montoya	10,000 m points race	—N/a				EL (34	

*Position is giving within the heat for the 500 m event

== Shooting ==
Costa Rica qualified two male shooters in the rifle discipline.

Men

Athlete	Event	Qualification		Final	
Athlete	Event	Points	Rank	Points	Rank
Roberto Chamberlain	10 metre air rifle	597.6	26	Did not advance	
Roberto Chamberlain	50 metre rifle three positions	1127	22	Did not advance	
Edgardo Sepulveda	10 metre air rifle	605.7	23	Did not advance	
Edgardo Sepulveda	50 metre rifle three positions	1130	21	Did not advance	

== Surfing ==
Costa Rica qualified four surfers (three men and one woman) in the sport's debut at the Pan American Games.

Artistic

Athlete	Event	Round 1	Round 2	Round 3	Round 4	Repechage 1	Repechage 2	Repechage 3	Repechage 4	Repechage 5	Bronze medal	Final	
Athlete	Event	Opposition Result	Opposition Result	Opposition Result	Opposition Result	Opposition Result	Opposition Result	Opposition Result	Opposition Result	Opposition Result	Opposition Result	Opposition Result	Rank
Noe McGonagle	Men's open	Correa (PER); W 13.40–9.33 Q	Young (CAN); W 15.40–12.27 Q	Mesinas (PER); L 9.90–15.94	Did not advance	Bye			Usuna (ARG); L 12.50–13.40	Did not advance			
Anthony Fillingim	Men's open	Delgado (PUR); W 10.67–7.74 Q	Bellorin (VEN); W 7.67–7.17 Q	Pérez (ESA); L 11.34–12.57	Did not advance	Bye			Muñiz (ARG); L 10.30–14.16	Did not advance			
Anthony Flores	Men's longboard	Robbins (USA), Ferrer (PUR); L 9.27 Q	Clemente (PER), Conceição (BRA); L 8.23	Did not advance		Bye	Cortéz (CHI); L 7.94–12.43	Did not advance					

Race

Athlete	Event	Time	Rank
Valeria Salustri	Women's stand up paddleboard	40:54.0	9

== Swimming ==
Men

Athlete	Event	Heats		Final	
Athlete	Event	Time	Position	Time	Position
Arnoldo Herrera	100 m breaststroke	1:07.11	24	Did not advance	
Arnoldo Herrera	200 m breaststroke	2:24.96	18 QB	Did not start	
Bryan Alvaréz	100 m butterfly	55.80	16 QB	55.50	13
Bryan Alvaréz	200 m butterfly	2:07.23	19	Did not advance	
Cristofer Lanuza	10 km marathon	—N/a		2:19:26.5	18

Women

Athlete	Event	Heats		Final	
Athlete	Event	Time	Position	Time	Position
Daniela Alfaro	200 m butterfly	2:18.84	12 QB	2:17.99	12
Daniela Alfaro	200 m individual medley	2:26.39	15 QB	2:27.18	15
Daniela Alfaro	400 m individual medley	5:17.13	12 QB	5:05.98	11

== Taekwondo ==
Costa Rica qualified four taekwondo practitioners (two per gender).

Kyorugi

Athlete	Event	Round of 16	Quarterfinals	Semifinals	Repechage	Final / BM	Rank
Athlete	Event	Opposition Result	Opposition Result	Opposition Result	Opposition Result	Opposition Result	Rank
Heiner Oviedo	Men's 58 kg	Miranda (ECU); W 23–22	Melo (BRA); L 10–30	Did not advance			
Juan Soto	Men's 68 kg	Paz (COL); W 16–15	Pontes (BRA); L 17–30	Did not advance	Bye	Nkogho-Mengue (CAN); L 12–13	=5
Nishy Lee Lindo	Women's 57 kg	Álvarez (COL); W 18–14	Zolotic (USA); L 8–23	Did not advance	Bye	Carstens (PAN); W 12–7	3rd place, bronze medalist(s)
Katherine Alvarado	Women's 67 kg	Acosta (CUB); L 0–0	Did not advance				

== Triathlon ==
Costa Rica qualified one female triathlete.

Men

Athlete	Event	Swim (1.5 km)	Trans 1	Bike (40 km)	Trans 2	Run (8.88 km)	Total	Rank
Raquel Solis	Individual	19:59	0:58	1:31:2	0:29	42:55	2:14:51	19

== Volleyball ==
=== Beach ===
Costa Rica qualified four beach volleyball athletes (two men and two women).

Men

Athlete	Event	Preliminary round				Round of 16	Quarterfinals	Semifinals	Final / BM	
Athlete	Event	Opposition Score	Opposition Score	Opposition Score	Rank	Opposition Score	Opposition Score	Opposition Score	Opposition Score	Rank
Victor Alpizar; Sebastian Valenciano	Men's	Brandao – Dealtry (BRA); L 0 – 2 (13-21, 14–21)	Cairus – Vieyto (URU); L 0 – 2 (20-22, 8-21)	Gonzalez – Reyes (CUB); L 0 – 2 (13-21, 16–21)	4	—N/a		13-16th classification Stewart – Phillip (TTO); W 2-1 (19-21, 21–16, 15–12)	13/14th place match Mora – Lopez (ESA); L 0-2 (16-21, 14–21)	14
Marcela Araya; Valeria Valenciano	Women's	Ayala – Ríos (COL); W (21–15, 21–14)	Cook – Pardon (USA); L (11–21, 11–21)	Davidson – Grant (TTO); W (21–18, 22–20)	2 Q	Mendoza – Rodriguez (NCA); W (21–14, 21–16)	Delís – Martínez (CUB); L (17–21, 14–21)	5th-8th place classification Mardones – Rivas (CHI); L (10–21, 9–21)	7th place match Caballero – Valiente (PAR); L (16–21, 20–22)	8

== Weightlifting ==
Costa Rica qualified four weightlifters (two men and two women). However, only three were entered (two men and one woman).

Athlete	Event	Snatch		Clean & jerk		Total	Rank
Athlete	Event	Result	Rank	Result	Rank	Total	Rank
Mario Araya	Men's 109 kg	120	16	156	16	276	16
Henry Cerdas	Men's 109 kg	109	8	153	8	262	8
Laura Zamora	Women's 64 kg	66	11	85	11	151	11

== Wrestling ==
Costa Rica qualified one male in the freestyle discipline.

Men's freestyle

Athlete	Event	Quarterfinals	Semifinals	Repechage	Final / BM	Rank
Athlete	Event	Opposition Result	Opposition Result	Opposition Result	Opposition Result	Rank
Maxwell Lacey	97 kg	Pérez (DOM); L 2–12	Did not advance			

== See also ==
- Costa Rica at the 2020 Summer Olympics
