= Costa Rica at the 2011 Pan American Games =

- IOC code: CRC
- NOC: Costa Rican Olympic Committee
- Website: concrc.org

in Guadalajara 14–30 October 2011
- Competitors: 91 in 19 sports
- Flag bearer: David Jimenez
- Medals Ranked 18th: Gold 1 Silver 0 Bronze 0 Total 1

Pan American Games appearances (overview)
- 1951; 1955; 1959; 1963; 1967; 1971; 1975; 1979; 1983; 1987; 1991; 1995; 1999; 2003; 2007; 2011; 2015; 2019; 2023; 2027

Costa Rica competed at the 2011 Pan American Games in Guadalajara, Mexico from October 14 to 30, 2011. Costa Rica sent 91 athletes in 18 sports.

== Medalists ==
Medal	Name	Sport	Event	Date
Gold	Nery Brenes	Athletics	Men's 400 metres	October 26

== Athletics ==
Men

Track and road events

Event	Athletes	Heats		Semifinal		Final	
Event	Athletes	Time	Rank	Time	Rank	Time	Rank
400 m	Nery Brenes			45.42	3rd Q	44.65 PB	1st place, gold medalist(s)
Marathon	Johnny Loria					DNF	
20 km walk	Allan Segura					DSQ	
50 km walk	Bernardo Calvo					4:21:19 PB	8th
50 km walk	Allan Segura					DNF	

Field events

Event	Athletes	Semifinal		Final	
Event	Athletes	Result	Rank	Result	Rank
High jump	Henry Linton			1.95 m.	17th
Hammer throw	Roberto Sawyers			65.09 m.	7th

Women

Track and road events

Event	Athletes	Semifinal		Final	
Event	Athletes	Result	Rank	Result	Rank
400 m hurdles	Sharolyns Scott	57.23	1st Q	57.40	4th
Marathon	Gabriela Traña			3:04:29	12th

== Basque pelota ==
=== Men ===
Athlete(s)	Event	Series 1	Series 2	Series 3	Series 4	Finals
Athlete(s)	Event	Opposition Score	Opposition Score	Opposition Score	Opposition Score	Opposition Score
Tomas Fernandez; Jorge Lopez	Paleta Rubber Pairs 30m Fronton	Enrique Blas (GUA); Juan Diego Blas (GUA); L 3 – 12, 4 – 12	Fernando Javier Celaya (CHI); Pedro De Orte (CHI); L 1 – 12, 0 – 12	Fernando Gabriel Ergueta (ARG); Javier Alejandro Nicosia (ARG); L 1 – 12, 0 – 12	Oscar Bustillo (NCA); Victor Bustillo (NCA); L 1 – 12, 4 – 12	Did not advance

== Beach volleyball ==
Costa Rica qualified a men's and women's team in the beach volleyball competition.

Athlete	Event	Preliminary round			Quarterfinals	Semifinals	Finals
Athlete	Event	Opposition Score	Opposition Score	Opposition Score	Opposition Score	Opposition Score	Opposition Score
Esteban Escobar; Bryan Monge	Men	Alison Cerutti (BRA); Emanuel Rego (BRA); L 11-21, 7-21	Sergio González (CUB); Karell Piña (CUB); L 23-25, 17-21	Yewddys Pérez (DOM); Germán Recio (DOM); L 22-24, 18-21	Did not advance		
Nathalia Alfaro; Ingrid Morales	Women	Fabiana Gómez (URU); Lucia Guigou (URU); L 21-16, 14-21, 13-15	Bibiana Candelas (MEX); Mayra García (MEX); L 8-21, 9-21	Amalia Hernández (NCA); Lollette Rodríguez (NCA); W 21-14, 21-15	Did not advance		

== Bowling ==
Costa Rica qualified two male and two female athletes in the individual and team bowling competitions.

=== Men ===
Individual

Athlete	Event	Qualification															Eighth Finals	Quarterfinals	Semifinals	Finals	
Athlete	Event	Block 1 (Games 1–6)						Block 2 (Games 7–12)						Total	Average	Rank	Eighth Finals	Quarterfinals	Semifinals	Finals	
Athlete	Event	1	2	3	4	5	6	7	8	9	10	11	12	Total	Average	Rank	Opposition Scores	Opposition Scores	Opposition Scores	Opposition Scores	Rank
Alejandro Reyna M.	Men's individual	203	233	224	216	245	235	190	252	236	210	187	168	2599	216.6	10th	Francisco Colon (PUR); L 619 – 624	Did not advance			
Mario Valverde	Men's individual	223	160	204	205	206	246	201	197	206	248	180	179	2455	204.6	14th	Amleto Monacelli (VEN); W 645 – 614	Chris Barnes (USA); L 535 – 760	Did not advance		

Pairs

Athlete	Event	Block 1 (Games 1–6)								Block 2 (Games 7–12)								Grand total	Final Rank
Athlete	Event	1	2	3	4	5	6	Total	Average	7	8	9	10	11	12	Total	Average	Grand total	Final Rank
Alejandro Reyna M. Mario Valverde	Men's pairs	192	159	201	180	223	146	1101	183.5	165	275	278	154	227	198	2398	199.8	4664	10th
Alejandro Reyna M. Mario Valverde	Men's pairs	202	203	180	178	188	166	1117	186.2	189	236	185	178	209	152	2266	188.8	4664	10th

=== Women ===
Individual

Athlete	Event	Qualification															Eighth Finals	Quarterfinals	Semifinals	Finals	
Athlete	Event	Block 1 (Games 1–6)						Block 2 (Games 7–12)						Total	Average	Rank	Eighth Finals	Quarterfinals	Semifinals	Finals	
Athlete	Event	1	2	3	4	5	6	7	8	9	10	11	12	Total	Average	Rank	Opposition Scores	Opposition Scores	Opposition Scores	Opposition Scores	Rank
Viviana Delgado	Women's individual	211	222	176	182	181	179	174	169	140	192	159	181	2166	180.5	23rd	Did not advance				
Sylvia Villalobos	Women's individual	186	200	169	191	179	177	202	194	174	168	169	173	2182	181.8	22nd	Did not advance				

Pairs

Athlete	Event	Block 1 (Games 1–6)								Block 2 (Games 7–12)								Grand total	Final Rank
Athlete	Event	1	2	3	4	5	6	Total	Average	7	8	9	10	11	12	Total	Average	Grand total	Final Rank
Sylvia Villalobos; Viviana Delgado	Women's pairs	143	158	156	177	154	158	946	157.7	170	180	193	193	164	186	2032	169.3	4253	12th
Sylvia Villalobos; Viviana Delgado	Women's pairs	212	178	188	186	236	205	1205	200.8	184	155	171	181	161	164	2221	185.1	4253	12th

== Boxing ==
Costa Rica qualified one athlete in the 49 kg men's category, and one athlete in the 51 kg women's category

=== Men ===
Athlete	Event	Preliminaries	Quarterfinals	Semifinals	Final
Athlete	Event	Opposition Result	Opposition Result	Opposition Result	Opposition Result
David Jimenez	Light Flyweight		Yosbany Veitia (CUB); L 2 – 14	Did not advance	

=== Women ===
Athlete	Event	Quarterfinals	Semifinals	Final
Athlete	Event	Opposition Result	Opposition Result	Opposition Result
Pamela Sanchez	Flyweight	Karlha Magliocco (VEN); L 14 – 27	Did not advance	

== Cycling ==
Costa Rica qualified a cycling team.

=== Road ===
Men

Athlete	Event	Time	Rank
Gregori Brenes	Road race	3:50:58	31st
Deiber Esquivel	Road race	3:50:58	27th
Federico Ramirez	Road race	3:50:58	28th
Gregori Brenes	Time trial	50:43.00	4th

Women

Athlete	Event	Time	Rank
Natalia Navarro	Road race	2:18:29	25th
Edith Guillen	Road race	2:18:23	14th
Adriana Rojas	Road race	2:18:23	16th
Natalia Navarro	Time trial	30:15.33	13th

=== Track ===
==== Omnium ====
Athlete	Event	Flying Lap Time Rank	Points Race Points Rank	Elimination Race Rank	Ind Pursuit Time	Scratch Race Rank	Time Trial Time	Final Rank
Marcela Rubiano	Women	16.135; 10th	23; 4th	10th	4:00.411; 9th	8th	40.294; 10th	51; 10th

=== Mountain biking ===
Men

Athlete	Event	Time	Rank
Jose Esquivel	Cross-country	1:39:55	9th
Federico Ramirez	Cross-country	1:40:44	10th

Women

Athlete	Event	Time	Rank
Adriana Rojas Cubero	Cross-country	1:40:55	6th

== Equestrian ==
Dressage

Athlete	Horse	Event	Grand Prix		Grand Prix Special		Grand Prix Freestyle		Final Score^{1}	Rank
Athlete	Horse	Event	Score	Rank	Score	Rank	Score	Rank	Final Score^{1}	Rank
Gloriana Herrera Arauz	Rhapsody	Individual	61.105	37th	Did not advance					
Michelle Batalla Navarro	Ferro	Individual	59.105	43rd	Did not advance					
Anne Egerstrom	Amorino	Individual	64.790	26th	60.474	25th	Did not advance			
Gretchen Luttmann	Dudrovnik	Individual	63.921	29th	Did not advance					
Gloriana Herrera Arauz; Michelle Batalla Navarro; Anne Egerstrom; Gretchen Luttmann	As above	Team	63.272	9th					63.272	9th

== Fencing ==
Costa Rica qualified one athlete in the individual women's épée competition.

=== Women ===
Event	Athlete	Round of Poules		Round of 16	Quarterfinals	Semifinals	Final
Event	Athlete	Result	Seed	Opposition Score	Opposition Score	Opposition Score	Opposition Score
Individual épée	Rayssa De Oliveira	0 V – 5 D	18th	Did not advance			

== Football ==
Costa Rica qualified a men's and women's team in the football competition.

=== Men ===
==== Squad ====
- Vianney Blanco
- Kevin Briceno
- Keyner Brown
- Jorge Davis
- Rudy Dawson
- Johnson Derrick
- Dylan Flores
- Jonathan McDonald
- Gualberto Montenegro
- Joseph Mora
- Carlos Ochoa
- Ricardo Rojas
- Jean Sanchez
- Jordan Smith
- Bryan Vega
- Deyver Vega
- Carlos Viales
- Oscar Villalovos

==== Standings ====
Pos	Team	Pld	W	D	L	GF	GA	GD	Pts	Qualification
1	Argentina	3	2	1	0	5	1	+4	7	Advance to Semifinals
2	Costa Rica	3	2	0	1	4	4	0	6	Advance to Semifinals
3	Brazil	3	0	2	1	2	4	−2	2	
4	Cuba	3	0	1	2	0	2	−2	1	

==== Results ====
October 19, 2011
10:00

Costa Rica	1 – 0	Cuba
Blanco 55'	Report

Estadio Omnilife, Guadalajara
Referee: Ricardo Arellano (Mexico)

October 21, 2011
10:00

Costa Rica	0 – 3	Argentina
	Report	Fragapane 40'; Pezzella 60'; Kruspzky 76'

Estadio Omnilife, Guadalajara
Referee: David Gantar (Canada)

October 23, 2011
20:00

Brazil	1 – 3	Costa Rica
Henrique 30'	Report	B. Vega 1'; McDonald 20', 43'

Estadio Omnilife, Guadalajara
Referee: Ricardo Arellano (Mexico)

==== Semifinals ====
October 26, 2011
17:00

Mexico	3 – 0	Costa Rica
Peralta 19', 38', 46'	Report

Estadio Omnilife, Guadalajara
Referee: Erick Roberto Andino (Honduras)

==== Bronze medal match ====
October 28, 2011
17:00

Costa Rica	1 – 2	Uruguay
McDonald 81' (pen.)	Report	G. Silva 48'; Píriz 61'

Estadio Omnilife, Guadalajara
Referee: Raúl Orosco (Bolivia)

=== Women ===
==== Squad ====
- Wendy Acosta
- Katherine Alvarado
- Julieth Arias
- Yirlania Arroyo
- Mariela Campos
- Daniela Cruz
- Shirley Cruz
- Karolina Durán
- María Gamboa
- Hazel Quirós
- Lixy Rodríguez
- Raquel Rodríguez
- Saudy Rosales
- Diana Sáenz
- Carol Sánchez
- Carolina Venegas
- Yendry Villalobos

==== Standings ====
Pos	Team	Pld	W	D	L	GF	GA	GD	Pts	Qualification
1	Brazil	3	2	1	0	4	1	+3	7	Advance to Semifinals
2	Canada	3	2	1	0	4	1	+3	7	Advance to Semifinals
3	Costa Rica	3	0	1	2	5	8	−3	1	
4	Argentina	3	0	1	2	3	6	−3	1	

==== Results ====
October 18, 2011
11:00

Canada	3 – 1	Costa Rica
Julien 29'; Sinclair 52'; Pietrangelo 82'	Report	Cruz 28' (pen.)

Estadio Omnilife, Guadalajara
Referee: Shane De Silva (Trinidad and Tobago)

October 20, 2011
17:00

Brazil	2 – 1	Costa Rica
Debinha 59'; Thaís Guedes 62'	Report	Cruz 90+5'

Estadio Omnilife, Guadalajara
Referee: Diane Ferreiras (Guyana)

October 22, 2011
13:00

Costa Rica	3 – 3	Argentina
Acosta 57'; Rodríguez 76'; Alvarado 81'	Report	Pereyra 5'; Vallejos 8'; Ugalde 17' (o.g.)

Estadio Omnilife, Guadalajara
Referee: Shane De Silva (Trinidad and Tobago)

== Gymnastics ==
=== Artistic ===
Costa Rica qualified one male and one female athlete in the artistic gymnastics competition.

Men

Individual qualification & Team Finals

Athlete	Event	Apparatus						Qualification	
Athlete	Event	Floor	Pommel horse	Rings	Vault	Parallel bars	Horizontal bar	Total	Rank
Jossimar Calvo	Ind Qualification	13.650	10.500	9.050	14.850	11.800	12.700	72.550	29th

Women
Individual qualification & Team Finals

Athlete	Event	Apparatus				Qualification	
Athlete	Event	Vault	Uneven bars	Balance Beam	Floor	Total	Rank
Yurany Avendaño	Ind Qualification	12.400	2.825	11.925	12.075	39.225	45th

== Karate ==
Costa Rica qualified one athlete in the 68 kg women's category.

Athlete	Event	Round robin (Pool A/B)			Semifinals	Final
Athlete	Event	Match 1	Match 2	Match 3	Semifinals	Final
Athlete	Event	Opposition Result	Opposition Result	Opposition Result	Opposition Result	Opposition Result
Ashley Binn	Women's -68 kg	Lucelia Ribeiro (BRA); L PTS 1:6	Elizabeth Retamal (CHI); W PTS 1:0	Yoandra Moreno (CUB); HWK 2:2	Did not advance	

== Racquetball ==
Costa Rica qualified two male athletes in the racquetball competition.

Men

Athlete	Event	Preliminary round (2 or 3)	Round of 16	Quarterfinals	Semifinals	Final
Athlete	Event	Opposition Score	Opposition Score	Opposition Score	Opposition Score	Opposition Score
Felipe Camacho	Singles	Ricardo Monroy (BOL); L 6 – 15, 8 – 15; Ro Carson III (USA); L 8 – 15, 7 – 15; Jose Ugalde (ECU); W 15 – 8, 15 – 4	Selvin Cruz (HON); W 15 – 8, 15 – 11	Vincent Gagnon (CAN); L 9 – 15, 11 – 15	Did not advance	
Teobaldo Fumero	Singles	Carlos Keller (BOL); L 14 – 15, 7 – 15; Luis A. Perez (DOM); L 13 – 15, 11 – 15; Michael Green (CAN); L 8 – 15, 11 – 15	Jose Ugalde (COL); W 15 – 12, 11 – 15, 11 – 8	Álvaro Beltrán (MEX); L 3 – 15, 3 – 15	Did not advance	
Teobaldo Fumero; Felipe Camacho	Doubles	Francisco J. Gomez (Costa Rica) Juan Torres (CRC); W 15 – 13, 15 – 9 Roland Keller (Bolivia) Ricardo Monroy (BOL); W 9 – 15, 15 – 2, 11 – 6 Christopher Crowther (United States) Shane Vanderson (USA); W 9 – 15, 15 – 12, 11 – 7		Jorge Hirsekorn (Venezuela) Cesar Castillo (VEN); L 15 – 9, 11 – 15, 6 – 11	Did not advance	
Teobaldo Fumero; Felipe Camacho	Team	Argentina; L 0 – 2, 2 – 1, 0 – 2	Did not advance			

== Roller skating ==
Costa Rica qualified a women's team in the roller skating competition.

Women

Athlete	Event	Qualification		Final	
Athlete	Event	Result	Rank	Result	Rank
Jennifer Monterrey	300 m time trial			28.965	7th
Jennifer Monterrey	1,000 m	1:38.337	5th Q	1:40.194	7th
Susanne Piedra	10,000 m			DNF	

== Rowing ==
Women

Athlete(s)	Event	Heat		Repechage		Final	
Athlete(s)	Event	Time	Rank	Time	Rank	Time	Rank
Liliana Boruchowicz	Single Sculls	9:50.02	4th R	9:05.57	5 qB	8:54.91	3rd B

== Swimming ==
Men

Event	Athletes	Heat		Final	
Event	Athletes	Result	Rank	Result	Rank
100 m Freestyle	Mario Montoya	51.86	16th qB	51.83	6th B
200 m Freestyle	Mario Montoya	1:54.70	15th qB	1:53.13	1st B
10 km marathon	Rodolfo Sanchez			2:11:53.1	14th

Women

Event	Athletes	Heat		Final	
Event	Athletes	Result	Rank	Result	Rank
100 m Freestyle	Marie Meza Peraza	1:01.13	18th	Did not advance	
100 m butterfly	Marie Meza Peraza	1:04.78	17th	Did not advance	

== Synchronized swimming ==
Costa Rica qualified a duet in the synchronized swimming competition.

Athlete	Event	Technical Routine		Free Routine (Final)			
Athlete	Event	Points	Rank	Points	Rank	Total Points	Rank
Violeta Mitinian; Nadezdha Gomez	Women's duet	69.875	9th	70.638	9th	140.513	9th

== Taekwondo ==
Costa Rica qualified two athletes in the 58 kg and 80+kg men's categories and one athlete in the 67 kg women's category.

Men

Athlete	Event	Round of 16	Quarterfinals	Semifinals	Final
Athlete	Event	Opposition Result	Opposition Result	Opposition Result	Opposition Result
Heiner Oviedo	Flyweight (-58kg)	Jocelyn Addison (CAN); L 3 – 9	Did not advance		
Kristopher Moitland	Heavyweight(+80kg)	Jurmen Amiena (SUR); W 8 – 5	Juan Carlos Diaz (VEN); L 6 – 7	Did not advance	

Women

Athlete	Event	Round of 16	Quarterfinals	Semifinals	Final
Athlete	Event	Opposition Result	Opposition Result	Opposition Result	Opposition Result
Katherine Alvarado	Welterweight (-67kg)	Taimi Castellanos (CUB); L 0 – 10	Did not advance		

== Triathlon ==
=== Men ===
Athlete	Event	Swim (1.5 km)	Trans 1	Bike (40 km)	Trans 2	Run (10 km)	Total	Rank
Leonardo Chacon	Individual	18:26; 15th	0:25; 15th	57:12; 10th	0:16; 20th	34:39; 12th	1:50:59	11th
Roger Rodriguez	Individual	19:31; 31st	0:28; 35th	1:05:18; 34th	0:22; 33rd	43:31; 32nd	2:04:28	30th

=== Women ===
Athlete	Event	Swim (1.5 km)	Trans 1	Bike (40 km)	Trans 2	Run (10 km)	Total	Rank
Alia Cardinale	Individual	20:48; 18th	0:27; 12th	1:03:04; 5th	0:17; 11th	42:19; 13th	2:06:58	14th

== Weightlifting ==
Athlete	Event	Snatch			Clean & jerk			Total	Rank
Athlete	Event	Attempt 1	Attempt 2	Attempt 3	Attempt 1	Attempt 2	Attempt 3	Total	Rank
Carlos Manuel Campos	Men's +105 kg	166	~~170~~	~~171~~	145	210	215	~~224~~	6th
