= Costa Rica at the 2027 Pan American Games =

- IOC code: CRC
- NOC: Costa Rican Olympic Committee

in Lima, Peru 2027 – 2027
- Competitors: 30 in 3 sports
- Medals: Gold 0 Silver 0 Bronze 0 Total 0

Pan American Games appearances (overview)
- 1951; 1955; 1959; 1963; 1967; 1971; 1975; 1979; 1983; 1987; 1991; 1995; 1999; 2003; 2007; 2011; 2015; 2019; 2023; 2027

Costa Rica is scheduled to compete at the 2027 Pan American Games in Lima, Peru from July 23 to August 8, 2027. This will be Costa Rica's 19th appearance at the Pan American Games, having competed at every Games except 1963.

== Competitors ==
The following is the list of number of competitors (per gender) participating at the games per sport/discipline.

Sport	Men	Women	Total
Equestrian			5
Football	18	0	18
Gymnastics	1	6	7
Total	19	6	30

== Equestrian ==
Costa Rica qualified a team of 4 equestrians in Dressage and 1 equestrian in Jumping through the 2026 Central American and Caribbean Games.

=== Dressage ===
Athlete	Horse	Event	Prix St. Georges		Grand Prix Special			Grand Prix Freestyle	
Athlete	Horse	Event	Score	Rank	Score	Total	Rank	Score	Rank
		Individual				—N/a			
		Team						—N/a	

=== Jumping ===
Athlete	Horse	Event	Qualification											Final							
Athlete	Horse	Event	Round 1			Round 2.1			Round 2.2			Total		Round A			Round B			Total	
Athlete	Horse	Event	Faults	Result Time	Rank	Faults	Result Time	Rank	Faults	Result Time	Rank	Faults	Rank	Faults	Result Time	Rank	Faults	Result Time	Rank	Faults	Rank
		Individual																			

== Football ==
Costa Rica qualified a men's team as the best Central American team at the 2026 CONCACAF U-20 Championship.

Summary

Key:

- A.E.T – After extra time.
- P – Match decided by penalty-shootout.

Team	Event	Group Stage				Semifinal	Final / BM	
Team	Event	Opposition Score	Opposition Score	Opposition Score	Rank	Opposition Score	Opposition Score	Rank
Costa Rica men's	Men's tournament							

== Gymnastics ==
=== Artistic ===
Costa Rica qualified a team of six gymnasts in artistic (one man and five women) at the 2026 Pan American Artistic Gymnastics Championships.

Men

Athlete	Event	Qualification						Total	Rank
Athlete	Event	F	PH	R	V	PB	HB	Total	Rank
	Individual all-around								

Qualification Legend: Q = Qualified to apparatus final

Women

Team & Individual Qualification

Athlete	Event	Final					
Athlete	Event	Apparatus				Total	Rank
Athlete	Event	V	UB	BB	F	Total	Rank
	Team						
Total	Team						

Qualification Legend: Q = Qualified to apparatus final

=== Rhythmic ===
Costa Rica qualified one individual gymnast in rhythmic at the 2026 Pan American Rhythmic Gymnastics Championships.

Individual

Athlete	Event	Apparatus				Total	
Athlete	Event	Ball	Clubs	Hoop	Ribbon	Score	Rank
	All-around						
