= Costa Rica at the 2007 Pan American Games =

- IOC code: CRC
- NOC: Costa Rican Olympic Committee
- Website: concrc.org

in Rio de Janeiro 13–29 July 2007
- Flag bearer: Katherine Alvarado
- Medals Ranked 33rd: Gold 0 Silver 0 Bronze 0 Total 0

Pan American Games appearances (overview)
- 1951; 1955; 1959; 1963; 1967; 1971; 1975; 1979; 1983; 1987; 1991; 1995; 1999; 2003; 2007; 2011; 2015; 2019; 2023; 2027

The 15th Pan American Games were held in Rio de Janeiro, Brazil from 13 to 29 July 2007.

== Results by event ==
=== Swimming ===
- Mario Montoya: Men's 400m Free—16th (4:07.47)

=== Triathlon ===
==== Men's Competition ====
- Leonardo Chacón
  - 1:53:13.75 – 5th place
- Roberto Machado
  - did not finish – no ranking

==== Women's Competition ====
- Alia Cardinale
  - 2:03:59.86 – 14th place
- Monica Umana
  - 2:12:08.31 – 24th place

== See also ==
- Costa Rica at the 2008 Summer Olympics
