= Equestrian at the 2019 Pan American Games – Individual dressage =

Individual dressage at the 2019 Pan American Games
- Venues: Club Militar La Molina
- Dates: 28, 29 and 31 July
- Competitors: 38 from 16 nations

Medalists
Gold medal	Sarah Lockman on First Apple; United States
Silver medal	Tina Irwin on Laurencio; Canada
Bronze medal	Jennifer Baumert on Handsome; United States

The individual dressage competition of the equestrian events at the 2019 Pan American Games took place 28–31 July 2019 at the Equestrian Club Militar La Molina in Lima.

The first round of the individual dressage competition was the FEI Prix St. Georges Test and the Grand Prix. The second round was the Intermediate I Test and the Grand Prix Special. The best 18 riders, with a maximum of three riders per country, from this second round qualified for the individual final, the third round. The third and last round was the individual final with the Intermediate I Freestyle and the Grand Prix Freestyle. The best three countries in the team ranking received a team spot for the Olympic Games in Tokyo 2020.

== Schedule ==
All times are Central Standard Time (UTC-7).

Date	Time	Round
July 28, 2019	9:00	Prix st. George/Grand Prix
July 29, 2019	8:30	Intermediate I/Grand Prix Special
July 31, 2019	9:00	Intermediate I Freestyle/Grand Prix Freestyle

== Judges ==
Appointment of Dressage judges was as follows:

Dressage

- (Netherlands) Eduard de Wolff van Westerrode (Ground Jury President)
- (United States) Janet Lee Foy (Ground Jury Member)
- (Australia) Mary Seefried (Ground Jury Member)
- (Germany) Thomas Kessler (Ground Jury Member)
- (Canada) Brenda Minor (Ground Jury Member)
- (Mexico) Maribel Alonso de Quinzanos (Ground Jury Member)
- (Peru) Marian Cunningham (Appeal Committee Member)
- (Mexico) Gabriele Teusche de Noble (Appeal Committee Member)

== Results ==
The results were as follows:

=== Qualification ===
Rank	Rider	Nation	Horse	PSG / GP		Int I / GPS		Total	Notes
Rank	Rider	Nation	Horse	Score	Rank	Score	Rank	Total	Notes
1	Sarah Lockman	United States	First Apple	76.088	1	75.912	1	152.000	Q
2	Tina Irwin	Canada	Laurenciano	73.735	2	73.853	2	147.588	Q
3	Lindsay Kellock	Canada	Floratina	73.176	3	73.147	3	146.323	Q
4	Naïma Moreira-Laliberté	Canada	Statesman	71.413	6	71.787	4	143.200	Q
5	Nora Batchelder	United States	Faro Sqf	71.441	5	71.529	5	142.970	Q
6	Jennifer Baumert	United States	Handsome	72.441	4	70.382	7	142.823	Q
7	Vera Protzen	Argentina	Wettkonig	70.059	8	71.529	5	141.588	Q
8	Yvonne Losos de Muñiz	Dominican Republic	Aquamarijn	70.370	7	69.872	8	140.242	Q
9	João dos Santos	Brazil	Carthago Comando SN	69.029	10	69.265	9	138.294	Q
10	Raul Corchuelo	Colombia	Senorita 43	68.235	13	68.265	11	136.500	Q
11	Jill Irving	Canada	Degas 12	68.391	12	67.851	12	136.242	
12	Christer Egerstrom	Costa Rica	Bello Oriente	66.647	16	68.676	10	135.323	Q
13	Alexandra Domínguez	Guatemala	Etanga	68.647	11	66.118	18	134.765	Q
14	Martha Del Valle	Mexico	Beduino Lam	67.217	15	67.447	13	134.664	Q
15	Roberta Foster	Barbados	Chic Chic	66.618	18	67.059	14	133.677	Q
16	Leandro Silva	Brazil	Dicaprio	67.326	14	66.298	16	133.624	Q
17	Bernadette Pujals	Mexico	Curioso XXV	66.500	19	66.298	16	132.798	
18	Patricia Ferrando	Venezuela	Zen	65.971	20	66.412	15	132.383	Q
19	João Oliva	Brazil	Biso das Lezirias	66.618	17	65.029	23	131.647	Q
20	Carolina Espinosa	Ecuador	Findus K	65.500	23	65.647	21	131.147	Q
21	Virginia Yarur	Chile	E Rava	69.500	9	61.265	30	130.765	
22	Maria Aponte	Colombia	Duke de Niro	64.647	27	65.971	19	130.618	
23	Pedro Almeida	Brazil	Aoleo	64.826	25	65.660	20	130.486	
24	Santiago Cardona	Colombia	Espartaco	65.235	24	65.235	22	130.470	
25	Jesús Palacios	Mexico	Tinto	65.529	22	64.647	24	130.176	
26	Fiorella Mengani	Argentina	Assirio D Atela	64.441	28	63.588	26	128.029	
27	Ronald Masis	Costa Rica	Zar AG	63.529	31	64.147	25	127.676	
28	Carlos Fernández	Chile	Destinado LXVII	64.676	26	62.765	29	127.441	
29	Isabel Arzu	Guatemala	Macchiato	63.765	30	63.235	27	127.000	
30	Irvin Leiva	Mexico	Pabellon	63.971	29	62.912	28	126.883	
31	Kerstin Rojas	Peru	Feuertanzer	65.647	21	60.941	31	126.588	
32	Monika von Wedemeyer	Peru	Briar S Boy	62.265	32	60.941	31	123.206	
33	Karen Atala	Honduras	D Esprit Joli	59.324	35	59.000	33	118.324	
34	Agustina Bravo	Uruguay	Svr Rafaga	60.324	34	57.882	34	118.206	
35	Eric Chaman	Peru	Catalina	60.765	33	57.353	35	118.118	
	Ramón Beca	Uruguay	Zaire	Eliminated					
	Bárbara Weber	Chile	Entusiasta	Eliminated					
	Luis Zone	Argentina	Faberge d'Atela	Eliminated					

=== Final round ===
Rank	Rider	Nation	Horse	GPF Score	Notes
1st place, gold medalist(s)	Sarah Lockman	United States	First Apple	78.980	
2nd place, silver medalist(s)	Tina Irwin	Canada	Laurencio	77.780	
3rd place, bronze medalist(s)	Jennifer Baumert	United States	Handsome	75.755	
4	Yvonne Losos de Muñiz	Dominican Republic	Aquamarijn	75.430	
5	Nora Batchelder	United States	Saro Sqf	73.630	
6	Naïma Moreira-Laliberté	Canada	Statesman	73.565	
7	Lindsay Kellock	Canada	Floratina	73.550	
8	João dos Santos	Brazil	Carthago Comando SN	72.685	
9	Vera Protzen	Argentina	Wettkonig	72.585	
10	Christer Egerstrom	Costa Rica	Bello Oriente	72.365	
11	Leandro Silva	Brazil	Dicaprio	71.420	
12	João Oliva	Brazil	Biso Das Lezirias	70.665	
13	Raul Corchuelo	Colombia	Senorita 43	70.240	
14	Roberta Foster	Barbados	Chic Chic	69.115	
15	Martha Del Valle	Mexico	Beduino Lam	68.780	
16	Patricia Ferrando	Venezuela	Zen	66.870	
17	Carolina Espinosa	Ecuador	Findus K	66.025	
18	Alexandra Domínguez	Guatemala	Etanga	64.930	
