= Cycling at the 2023 Pan American Games – Men's BMX freestyle =

Men's BMX Freestyle at the 2023 Pan American Games
- Venue: BMX Track
- Date: 5 November 2023
- Competitors: 9 from 9 nations
- Winning score: 86.00

Medalists
Gold medal	José Torres	Argentina
Silver medal	José Manuel Cedano	Chile
Bronze medal	Gustavo Oliveira	Brazil

The men's BMX freestyle competition of the cycling events at the 2023 Pan American Games was held on 5 November 2023 at the BMX Track in Santiago, Chile.

== Schedule ==
Date	Time	Round
5 November 2023	11:20	Qualification
5 November 2023	13:25	Final

== Results ==
=== Qualification ===
The best eight average scores advance to the final.

Rank	Name	Nation	Run 1	Run 2	Score	Notes
1	José Torres	Argentina	81.67	80.80	80.83	Q
2	Kenneth Tencio	Costa Rica	80.80	79.67	79.83	Q
3	Nicholas Bruce	United States	78.33	79.00	78.67	Q
4	José Manuel Cedano	Chile	75.67	78.00	76.83	Q
5	Gustavo Oliveira	Brazil	73.83	75.33	74.58	Q
6	Kevin Peraza	Mexico	73.67	74.67	74.17	Q
7	Daniel Dhers	Venezuela	74.00	73.00	73.50	Q
8	Luis Rincón	Colombia	70.33	60.00	65.17	Q
9	Job Montañez	Peru	39.33	41.00	40.17	

=== Final ===
The results were as follows.

Rank	Name	Nation	Run 1	Run 2	Score	Notes
1st place, gold medalist(s)	José Torres	Argentina	86.00	00.00	86.00	
2nd place, silver medalist(s)	José Manuel Cedano	Chile	85.67	17.00	85.67	
3rd place, bronze medalist(s)	Gustavo Oliveira	Brazil	75.67	83.67	83.67	
4	Kenneth Tencio	Costa Rica	80.33	78.67	80.33	
5	Kevin Peraza	Mexico	47.67	80.00	80.00	
6	Luis Rincón	Colombia	52.33	51.33	52.33	
7	Daniel Dhers	Venezuela	37.33	49.33	49.33	
8	Nicholas Bruce	United States	15.00	25.00	25.00	
