= Swimming at the 2015 Pan American Games – Qualification =

== Qualification system ==
As with previous editions of the Games, A/B qualifying times will be used, with a target number of 276 swimmers. Times need to be swum in an approved meet sometime between January 1, 2014 and May 1, 2015. A total of 36 open water swimmers will also qualify (18 per gender).

== Swimming qualification times ==
The time standards (all long course) for the 2015 Pan American Games are:

Male		Event	Female	
A standard (2 entries)	B standard (1 entry)	Event	A standard (2 entries)	B standard (1 entry)
22.71	24.07	50 freestyle	26.05	27.61
50.05	53.05	100 freestyle	56.91	1:00.32
1:51.49	1:58.18	200 freestyle	2:04.99	2:12.49
3:57.29	4:11.53	400 freestyle	4:17.99	4:33.47
—N/a	—N/a	800 freestyle	8:52.99	9:24.97
15:48.39	16:45.29	1500 freestyle	—N/a	—N/a
56.59	59.99	100 backstroke	1:04.09	1:07.94
2:06.05	2:13.61	200 backstroke	2:20.19	2:28.60
1:02.79	1:06.56	100 breaststroke	1:11.89	1:16.20
2:19.49	2:27.86	200 breaststroke	2:36.89	2:46.30
53.99	57.23	100 butterfly	1:01.49	1:05.18
2:01.39	2:08.67	200 butterfly	2:17.99	2:26.27
2:07.29	2:14.93	200 individual medley	2:20.49	2:28.92
4:35.99	4:52.55	400 individual medley	4:59.99	5:17.99

== Open Water ==
=== Qualification timeline ===
Event	Date	Venue
2014 Central American and Caribbean Games	November 21–22	(Mexico) Veracruz
2015 South American Championships	February 7	(Argentina) Viedma

=== Summary ===
NOC	Men	Women	Athletes
Argentina	2	2	4
Brazil	2	1	3
Canada	2	2	4
Chile		1	1
Costa Rica	1	2	3
Ecuador	1	1	2
El Salvador		1	1
Guatemala	2	2	4
Honduras		1	1
Mexico	2	2	4
Trinidad and Tobago	1		1
United States	2	2	4
Venezuela	2	2	4
Total: 13 NOC's	17	19	36

=== Qualified swimmers ===
Event	Quotas	Men	Women
Host nation	2/2	Canada; Canada	Canada; Canada
United States	2/2	United States; United States	United States; United States
2014 Central American and Caribbean Games	6/8	Mexico; Mexico; ~~Dominican Republic~~; ~~Dominican Republic~~; Costa Rica; ~~Costa Rica~~; Trinidad and Tobago; Guatemala; Guatemala	Mexico; Mexico; Guatemala; Guatemala; El Salvador; Honduras; Costa Rica; Guatemala; Costa Rica
2015 South American Championships	7/7	Brazil; Brazil; Ecuador; Argentina; Venezuela; Venezuela; Argentina	Chile; Argentina; Ecuador; Venezuela; Venezuela; Argentina; Brazil
Total	36	17	19
