= Taekwondo at the 2015 Pan American Games – Women's 67 kg =

Taekwondo – Women's 67 kg at the 2015 Pan American Games
- Venue: Mississauga Sports Centre
- Dates: July 21
- Competitors: 14 from 14 nations

Medalists
Gold medal	Paige McPherson	United States
Silver medal	Victoria Heredia	Mexico
Bronze medal	Alexis Arnoldt	Argentina
Bronze medal	Daima Villalon	Cuba

The women's 67 kg competition of the taekwondo events at the 2015 Pan American Games took place on July 21 at the Mississauga Sports Centre. The defending Pan American Games champion was Melissa Pagnotta of the Canada.

== Qualification ==
Most athletes qualified through the qualification tournament held in March 2015 in Mexico, while host nation Canada was permitted to enter one athlete. An athlete from Haiti later received a wildcard to compete in the event.

== Schedule ==
All times are Eastern Daylight Time (UTC-4).

Date	Time	Round
July 21, 2015	14:05	Preliminaries
July 21, 2015	15:35	Quarterfinals
July 21, 2015	16:35	Semifinals
July 21, 2015	20:05	Repechage
July 21, 2015	20:35	Bronze medal matches/Final

== Results ==
=== Main bracket ===
The final results were:

Preliminary round
Patricia Figueroa (CHI)	0
Daima Villalon (CUB)	12
Adanys Cordero (VEN)	3
Aniya Louissaint (HAI)	1
Brieanna Hernandez (PUR)	5
Julia Vasconcelos (BRA)	12
Katherine Dumar (COL)	3
Iris Carvallo (ECU)	2
Yosselyn Molina (HON)	1
Katherine Alvarado (CRC)	5
Alexis Arnoldt (ARG)	9
Victoria Heredia (MEX)	10

Quarter-finals
Paige McPherson (USA)	5
Daima Villalon (CUB)	3
Adanys Cordero (VEN)	1
Julia Vasconcelos (BRA)	3
Katherine Dumar (COL)	2
Katherine Alvarado (CRC)	8
Victoria Heredia (MEX)	14
Ashley Kraayeveld (CAN)	2

Semi-finals
Paige McPherson (USA)	8
Julia Vasconcelos (BRA)	6
Katherine Alvarado (CRC)	2
Victoria Heredia (MEX)	3

Gold medal match
Paige McPherson (USA)	13
Victoria Heredia (MEX)	1

=== Repechage ===
Semifinal			Bronze medal match
			1	Julia Vasconcelos (BRA)	1
2	Ashley Kraayeveld (CAN)	0		Alexis Arnoldt (ARG)	5
3	Alexis Arnoldt (ARG)	21

Bronze medal match
Daima Villalon (CUB)	9
Katherine Alvarado (CRC)	3
