= Bowling at the 2023 Pan American Games – Men's singles =

Men's singles at the 2023 Pan American Games
- Venue: Bowling Center
- Dates: November 3 - November 5
- Competitors: 25 from 13 nations
- Winning score: 795

Medalists
Gold medal	A.J. Johnson	United States
Silver medal	Michel Hupé	Canada
Bronze medal	Marco Moretti	Costa Rica
Bronze medal	Cristian Azcona	Puerto Rico

The men's singles competition of the bowling events at the 2023 Pan American Games was held from November 3 to 5 at the Bowling Center in La Florida, Chile.

== Schedule ==
Date	Time	Round
November 3, 2023	08:00	Ranking Round - Day 1
November 4, 2023	14:00	Ranking Round - Day 2
November 5, 2023	10:00	Semifinals
November 5, 2023	12:00	Final

== Results ==
=== Ranking Round ===
The highest four scores advance to the semifinals.

Rank	Nation	Athlete	Total	Notes
1	Michel Hupé	Canada	3650	Q
2	Marco Moretti	Costa Rica	3545	Q
3	A.J. Johnson	United States	3511	Q
4	Cristian Azcona	Puerto Rico	3465	Q
5	Rodolfo Monacelli	Venezuela	3435	
6	Brandon Bonta	United States	3432	
7	François Lavoie	Canada	3410	
8	Israel Hernández	Puerto Rico	3341	
9	Luis Rovaina	Venezuela	3335	
10	Sebastián Salazar	Colombia	3327	
11	Rolando Sebelen	Dominican Republic	3281	
12	Wascar Cavallo	Dominican Republic	3258	
13	Edgar Burgos	Puerto Rico	3257	
14	Marcelo Suartz	Brazil	3233	
15	Felipe Gil	Colombia	3222	
16	Raúl Ayala	Ecuador	3207	
17	Marvin León	Independent Athletes Team	3206	
18	Patricio Borquez	Chile	3198	
19	Gustavo Wong	Ecuador	3196	
20	Jesús Borgueaud	Chile	3180	
21	William Duen	Panama	3178	
22	Diego Aguilar	Independent Athletes Team	3135	
23	Bruno Soares	Brazil	3126	
24	Juan Rodríguez	Costa Rica	3123	
25	Donald Lee	Panama	3010	

=== Semifinals ===
The winner of each match advance to the final while the remaining athletes receive the bronze medal.

Rank	Nation	Athlete	Total	Notes
	A.J. Johnson	United States	680	Q
3rd place, bronze medalist(s)	Marco Moretti	Costa Rica	666	
	Michel Hupé	Canada	673	Q
3rd place, bronze medalist(s)	Cristian Azcona	Puerto Rico	665	

=== Final ===
Rank	Nation	Athlete	Total	Notes
1st place, gold medalist(s)	A.J. Johnson	United States	795	
2nd place, silver medalist(s)	Michel Hupé	Canada	727	
