= Costa Rica at the 2003 Pan American Games =

- IOC code: CRC
- NOC: Costa Rican Olympic Committee
- Website: concrc.org

in Santo Domingo 1–17 August 2003
- Flag bearer: Xinia Alvarado
- Medals Ranked 28th: Gold 0 Silver 0 Bronze 1 Total 1

Pan American Games appearances (overview)
- 1951; 1955; 1959; 1963; 1967; 1971; 1975; 1979; 1983; 1987; 1991; 1995; 1999; 2003; 2007; 2011; 2015; 2019; 2023

The 14th Pan American Games were held in Santo Domingo, Dominican Republic from August 1 to August 17, 2003.

== Medals ==
=== Bronze ===
===== Cycling =====
- Men's Mountain Bike: Deiber Esquivel

== Results by event ==
=== Cycling ===
==== Road ====
- Juan Pablo Araya
  - Men's Road Time Trial — + 5.33 (→ 14th place)

==== Mountain Bike ====
- Deiber Esquivel
  - Men's Cross Country — + 1.49 (→ 3rd place)
- José Adrián Bonilla
  - Men's Cross Country — did not finish (→ no ranking)
- Karen Matamoros
  - Women's Cross Country — + 1 lap (→ 6th place)

=== Triathlon ===
Athlete	Event	Race			Total	
Athlete	Event	Swim	Bike	Run	Time	Rank
Leonardo Chacón	Men's Individual	20:49.800	58:44.400	37:31.900	01:58:06	16
Fabio Campo	Men's Individual	23:11.300	1:00:25.900	43:15.500	02:08:12	29
Roberto Machado	Men's Individual	23:11.700	1:00:33.400	43:54.500	02:08:41	30
Monica Umaña	Women's Individual	21:59.400	1:10:47.700	48:37.900	02:21:25	17
Viviana Chavarria	Women's Individual	21:52.900	—	—	DNF	—

== See also ==
- Costa Rica at the 2004 Summer Olympics
