= Costa Rica at the 1995 Pan American Games =

- IOC code: CRC
- NOC: Costa Rican Olympic Committee
- Website: concrc.org

in Mar del Plata 11–26 March 1995
- Medals Ranked 22nd: Gold 0 Silver 1 Bronze 1 Total 2

Pan American Games appearances (overview)
- 1951; 1955; 1959; 1963; 1967; 1971; 1975; 1979; 1983; 1987; 1991; 1995; 1999; 2003; 2007; 2011; 2015; 2019; 2023; 2027

The 12th Pan American Games were held in Mar del Plata, Argentina from March 11 to March 26, 1995.

== Medals ==
=== Silver ===
===== Cycling =====
- Men's Mountain Bike (MTB): Andres Brenes

=== Bronze ===
===== Taekwondo =====
- Men's – 58 kg: Pedro Carazo

== See also ==
- Costa Rica at the 1996 Summer Olympics
