= Costa Rica at the 2023 Pan American Games =

- IOC code: CRC
- NOC: Costa Rican Olympic Committee

in Santiago, Chile 20 October 2023 – 5 November 2023
- Competitors: 56 in 13 sports
- Flag bearers (opening): Andrés Acuña & Nishy Lee Lindo
- Flag bearer (closing): Andrea Vargas
- Medals Ranked 18th: Gold 1 Silver 1 Bronze 7 Total 9

Pan American Games appearances (overview)
- 1951; 1955; 1959; 1963; 1967; 1971; 1975; 1979; 1983; 1987; 1991; 1995; 1999; 2003; 2007; 2011; 2015; 2019; 2023; 2027

Costa Rica is scheduled to compete at the 2023 Pan American Games in Santiago, Chile from October 20 to November 5, 2023. This was Costa Rica's 18th appearance at the Pan American Games, having competed at every Games except 1963.

Racquetball athlete Andrés Acuña and taekwondo athlete Nishy Lee Lindo were the country's flagbearers during the opening ceremony. Meanwhile, track athlete Andrea Vargas was the country's flagbearer during the closing ceremony.

== Medalists ==
The following Costa Rican competitors won medals at the games. In the by discipline sections below, medalists' names are bolded.

Medal	Name	Sport	Event	Date
Gold	Andrea Vargas	Athletics	Women's 100 metres hurdles	November 1
Silver	Jennifer Kalmbach	Surfing	Women's SUP race	October 30
Bronze	Andrés Acuña; Gabriel Garcia	Racquetball	Men's doubles	October 23
Bronze	Maricruz Ortiz	Racquetball	Women's singles	October 23
Bronze	Leilani McGonagle	Surfing	Women's shortboard	October 30
Bronze	Lia Reyes Días	Surfing	Women's longboard	October 30
Bronze	Marco Moretti; Juan Rodríguez	Bowling	Men's doubles	November 2
Bronze	Daniela Rojas	Athletics	Women's 400 metres hurdles	November 3
Bronze	Marco Moretti	Bowling	Men's singles	November 5

== Competitors ==
The following is the list of number of competitors (per gender) participating at the games per sport/discipline.

Sport	Men	Women	Total
Artistic swimming	—N/a	2	2
Badminton	1	0	1
Basque pelota	0	1	1
Boxing	0	4	4
Cycling	6	5	11
Football	0	18	18
Gymnastics	1	3	4
Judo	1	1	2
Racquetball	2	2	4
Roller sports	2	0	2
Rowing	0	1	1
Surfing	4	4	8
Taekwondo	1	2	3
Triathlon	1	2	3
Weightlifting	2	2	4
Wrestling	1	0	1
Total	22	47	69

== Artistic swimming ==
Costa Rica qualified a team of two artistic swimmers at the 2022 Central American and Caribbean Games.

Athlete	Event	Technical Routine		Free Routine (Final)			
Athlete	Event	Points	Rank	Points	Rank	Total Points	Rank
Andrea Maroto; Raquel Zuñiga	Women's duet						

== Badminton ==
Costa Rica qualified one male athlete.

Men

Athlete	Event	First round	Second round	Quarterfinals	Semifinals	Final	Rank
Athlete	Event	Opposition Result	Opposition Result	Opposition Result	Opposition Result	Opposition Result	Rank
Gianpiero Cavallotti	Singles	Henry Huebla Leon (ECU)					

== Basque pelota ==
Costa Rica qualified a female pelotari through the 2023 Pan American Basque Pelota Tournament.

Women

Athlete	Event	Preliminary round					Semifinal	Final / BM	Rank
Athlete	Event	Match 1	Match 2	Match 3	Match 4	Rank	Semifinal	Final / BM	Rank
Athlete	Event	Opposition Score	Opposition Score	Opposition Score	Opposition Score	Rank	Opposition Score	Opposition Score	Rank
María Fernanda Araya	Frontball								

== Boxing ==
Costa Rica qualified four female boxers.

Athlete	Event	Quarterfinal	Semifinal	Final	
Athlete	Event	Opposition Result	Opposition Result	Opposition Result	Rank
Valeria Cárdenas	Women's –50 kg				
Nicole Barrantes	Women's –54 kg				
Pamela Sánchez	Women's –60 kg				
Nicole Vega	Women's –66 kg				

== Cycling ==
Costa Rica qualified a total of 10 cyclists (six men and four women).

=== BMX ===
Freestyle

Athlete	Event	Seeding		Final	
Athlete	Event	Points	Rank	Points	Rank
Kenneth Tencio	Men				

=== Mountain biking ===
Costa Rica qualified 4 athletes at the 2023 Pan American Championships.

Athlete	Event	Time	Rank
Jonathan Quesada	Men's Cross-country		
Paolo Montoya	Men's Cross-country		
Adriana Rojas	Women's Cross-country		
Isabella Gómez	Women's Cross-country		

=== Road ===
Costa Rica qualified 1 road cyclist after winning the event in the 2021 Junior Pan American Games. Costa Rica qualified 1 cyclist at the Central American Championships. Costa Rica also qualified 3 cyclists at the Pan American Championships.

Athlete	Event	Time	Rank
Gabriel Rojas	Men's road race		
Jason Huertas	Men's road race		
Sebastián Brenes	Men's road race		
Milagro Mena	Women's road race		
Yendry Quesada	Women's road race		

=== Track ===
Costa Rica qualified a female track cyclist.

Sprint

Athlete	Event	Qualification		Round of 16	Repechage 1	Quarterfinals	Semifinals	Final	
Athlete	Event	Time	Rank	Opposition Time	Opposition Time	Opposition Result	Opposition Result	Opposition Result	Rank
	Women's individual								

== Football ==
=== Women's tournament ===
Costa Rica qualified a women's team of 18 athletes after finishing as the top ranked Central American team at the 2022 CONCACAF W Championship.

Summary

Key:

- A.E.T – After extra time.
- P – Match decided by penalty-shootout.

Team	Event	Group Stage				Semifinal	Final / BM	
Team	Event	Opposition Score	Opposition Score	Opposition Score	Rank	Opposition Score	Opposition Score	Rank
Costa Rica women's	Women's tournament							

== Gymnastics ==
=== Artistic ===
Costa Rica qualified three gymnasts in artistic (one man and two women) at the 2023 Pan American Championships.

Men

Athlete	Event	Qualification						Total	Rank
Athlete	Event	F	PH	R	V	PB	HB	Total	Rank
	Individual all-around								

Qualification Legend: Q = Qualified to apparatus final

Women

Athlete	Event	Qualification				Total	Rank
Athlete	Event	V	UB	BB	F	Total	Rank
	Individual all-around						

Qualification Legend: Q = Qualified to apparatus final

=== Rhythmic ===
Costa Rica qualified one individual gymnast.

Individual

Athlete	Event	Apparatus				Total	
Athlete	Event	Ball	Clubs	Hoop	Ribbon	Score	Rank
	All-around						
	Ball		—N/a				
	Clubs	—N/a		—N/a			
	Hoop	—N/a			—N/a		
	Ribbon	—N/a					

== Judo ==
Costa Rica has qualified 2 judokas (one man and one woman).

Athlete	Event	Round of 16	Quarterfinals	Semifinals	Repechage	Final / BM	
Athlete	Event	Opposition Result	Opposition Result	Opposition Result	Opposition Result	Opposition Result	Rank
	Men's 60 kg						
	Women's 70 kg						

== Racquetball ==
Costa Rica qualified four racquetball athletes (two men and two women).

Athlete	Event	Preliminary round				Round of 16	Quarterfinal	Semifinal	Final	
Athlete	Event	Opposition Result	Opposition Result	Opposition Result	Rank	Opposition Result	Opposition Result	Opposition Result	Opposition Result	Rank
Andrés Acuña	Men's singles									
Gabriel García	Men's singles									
Andrés Acuña; Gabriel García	Men's doubles									
Andrés Acuña; Gabriel García	Men's team	—N/a								
Maricruz Ortíz	Women's singles									
Jimena Gómez	Women's singles									
Maricruz Ortíz; Jimena Gómez	Women's doubles									
Maricruz Ortíz; Jimena Gómez	Women's team	—N/a								
Andrés Acuña; Maricruz Ortíz	Mixed doubles									

== Roller sports ==
=== Speed ===
Athlete	Event	Preliminary		Semifinal		Final	
Athlete	Event	Time	Rank	Time	Rank	Time	Rank
Marlon Oreamuno	Men's 200 m time trial						
Marlon Oreamuno	Men's 500 m						
Sebastián Cordero	Men's 1000 m sprint						
Sebastián Cordero	Men's 10,000 m elimination	—N/a					

== Rowing ==
Costa Rica qualified a female rower.

Women

Athlete	Event	Heat		Repechage		Semifinal		Final A/B	
Athlete	Event	Time	Rank	Time	Rank	Time	Rank	Time	Rank
	Single sculls								

== Surfing ==
Costa Rica qualified eight surfers (four men and four women).

Artistic

Athlete	Event	Round 1	Round 2	Round 3	Round 4	Repechage 1	Repechage 2	Repechage 3	Repechage 4	Repechage 5	Final / BM	
Athlete	Event	Opposition Result	Opposition Result	Opposition Result	Opposition Result	Opposition Result	Opposition Result	Opposition Result	Opposition Result	Opposition Result	Opposition Result	Rank
Oscar Urbina	Men's shortboard											
Leilani McGonagle	Women's shortboard											
Nataly Bernold	Women's shortboard											
José Ruíz Avilés	Men's stand up paddleboard											
Anthony Flores	Men's Longboard											
Lia Reyes Díaz	Women's Longboard											

Race

Athlete	Event	Time	Rank
Carlo Arias	Men's stand up paddleboard		
Jennifer Kalmbach	Women's stand up paddleboard		

== Taekwondo ==
Costa Rica qualified 3 athletes (one man and two women) during the Pan American Games Qualification Tournament.

Kyorugi

Athlete	Event	Round of 16	Quarterfinals	Semifinals	Repechage	Final/ BM	
Athlete	Event	Opposition Result	Opposition Result	Opposition Result	Opposition Result	Opposition Result	Rank
	–80 kg						
	–49 kg						
	–57 kg						

== Triathlon ==
Costa Rica qualified a triathlon team of three athletes (one man and two women).

Athlete	Event	Swim (1.5 km)	Trans 1	Bike (40 km)	Trans 2	Run (10 km)	Total	Rank
Álvaro Campos	Men's individual							
Catalina Torres	Women's individual							
Raquel Solís	Women's individual							

== Weightlifting ==
Costa Rica qualified four weightlifters (two men and two women).

Athlete	Event	Snatch		Clean & Jerk		Total	Rank
Athlete	Event	Result	Rank	Result	Rank	Total	Rank

== Wrestling ==
Costa Rica qualified one male wrestler (Freestyle 97 kg) through the 2022 Pan American Wrestling Championships held in Acapulco, Mexico.

Key:

- VT – Victory by fall.
- PP – Decision by points – the loser with technical points.
- PO – Decision by points – the loser without technical points.
- SP – Technical superiority – the loser with technical points and a margin of victory of at least 9 (Greco-Roman) or 10 (freestyle) points.
- ST – Great superiority – the loser without technical points and a margin of victory of at least 8 (Greco-Roman) or 10 (freestyle) points.
- VA – Decision by withdrawal

Men

Athlete	Event	Quarterfinal	Semifinal	Final / BM	
Athlete	Event	Opposition Result	Opposition Result	Opposition Result	Rank
Maxwell Lacey	Freestyle 97 kg				

== See also ==
- Costa Rica at the 2024 Summer Olympics
