= Costa Rica at the Pan American Games =

- IOC code: CRC
- NOC: Costa Rican Olympic Committee
- Website: concrc.org
- Medals Ranked 25th: Gold 7 Silver 7 Bronze 20 Total 34

Pan American Games appearances (overview)
- 1951; 1955; 1959; 1963; 1967; 1971; 1975; 1979; 1983; 1987; 1991; 1995; 1999; 2003; 2007; 2011; 2015; 2019; 2023

Costa Rica at the Pan American Games.

== Pan American Games ==
=== Medals by games ===
Year	Host city	Gold	Silver	Bronze	Total
1951	Buenos Aires	0	1	0	1
1955	Mexico City	0	0	0	0
1959	Chicago	0	0	0	0
1963	São Paulo	0	0	0	0
1967	Winnipeg	0	0	0	0
1971	Cali	0	0	0	0
1975	Mexico City	0	0	0	0
1979	San Juan	0	0	0	0
1983	Caracas	0	0	0	0
1987	Indianapolis	3	4	4	11
1991	Havana	1	0	1	2
1995	Mar del Plata	0	1	1	2
1999	Winnipeg	0	0	1	1
2003	Santo Domingo	0	0	1	1
2007	Rio de Janeiro	0	0	0	0
2011	Guadalajara	1	0	0	1
2015	Toronto	0	0	1	1
2019	Lima	1	0	4	5
2023	Santiago	1	1	7	9
Total		7	7	20	34

== Junior Pan American Games ==
=== Medals by games ===
Games	Gold	Silver	Bronze	Total	Rank
(Colombia) 2021 Cali-Valle	2	3	5	10	16th
(Paraguay) 2025 Asunción	Future event				
Total	2	3	5	10	16th
