= Mario Montoya (swimmer) =

Costa Rican swimmer (born 1989)

Personal information
- Full name: Mario Enrique Montoya Segnini
- Nationality: Costa Rica
- Born: August 18, 1989 (age 36) San José, Costa Rica
- Height: 6 ft 5 in (1.96 m)
- Weight: 84 kg (185 lb)

Sport
- Sport: Swimming
- Strokes: Freestyle, Backstroke

Mario Montoya (born August 18, 1989 in San José, Costa Rica) is an Olympic and national record holding swimmer from Costa Rica. He has represented his native country at the:

- 2008 Olympics and 2012 Olympics,
- 2007 Pan American Games,
- 2007 World Championships, and
- 2006 Central American and Caribbean Games

As of July 2018, he holds the Costa Rican record in the 100 m, 200 m and 800 m freestyle and the 100 m backstroke in long course swimming and the 200 m freestyle short course.

== Nowadays ==
Mario obtained a master's degree in Network Administration at Universidad del Turao in Puerto Rico. He currently works in Microsoft as a Support Engineer.
