= Martha Del Valle =

Mexican dressage rider

Martha del Valle
Personal information
- Full name: Martha Fernanda del Valle Quirarte
- Nickname: Mafer
- Born: 3 October 1988 (age 37) Tepeji del Río de Ocampo, Mexico

Sport
- Country: Mexico
- Sport: Equestrian
- Event: Dressage

Achievements and titles
- Regional finals: 2019 Pan American Games
- Personal bests: 69.565% (GP); 70.872% (GPS); 72.435% (GPF)

Martha Fernanda del Valle Quirarte (Note: In this Spanish name, the first or paternal surname is Del Valle and the second or maternal family name is Quirarte.) (born 3 October 1988) is a Mexican dressage rider. She took part at the 2019 Pan American Games and competed at the Tokyo 2020 Summer Olympics, ranked 51st individually.

== Career ==
Del Valle started riding at the age of 5. She was selected to compete at the 2019 Pan American Games in Lima, where she placed 15th individually and helped the Mexican team a 4th-place finish. That same year, Mexico earned an individual spot at the Tokyo Olympics. The spot was earned by a two-time Olympian Bernadette Pujals, who later switched allegiance to Spain, which allowed Del Valle to become the front-runner for selection.

To prepare for the Olympics, Del Valle and her home-bred Lusitano Beduino LAM competed at the Global Dressage Festival in Wellington, Florida in early 2020. She then relocated to Germany, for what were supposed to be the final preparations. The postponement of the Olympics, amidst the COVID-19 pandemic, forced Del Valle to stay in Europe for an extra year. She started working at Hof Kasselmann in Hagen and received an upkeep in return. In the spring of 2021, Del Valle relocated to Portugal, for a further Olympic preparation period under the expertise of her coach, Portuguese Olympian Miguel Duarte.
