= Costa Rica at the 1991 Pan American Games =

- IOC code: CRC
- NOC: Costa Rican Olympic Committee
- Website: concrc.org

in Havana 8–18 August 1991
- Medals Ranked 14th: Gold 1 Silver 0 Bronze 1 Total 2

Pan American Games appearances (overview)
- 1951; 1955; 1959; 1963; 1967; 1971; 1975; 1979; 1983; 1987; 1991; 1995; 1999; 2003; 2007; 2011; 2015; 2019; 2023

The 11th Pan American Games were held in Havana, Cuba from August 2 to August 18, 1991.

== Medals ==
=== Gold ===
===== Swimming =====
- Women's 100 m Backstroke: Silvia Poll

=== Bronze ===
===== Roller Sports =====
- Men's 20000 m: Guillermo Mata

== See also ==
- Costa Rica at the 1992 Summer Olympics
