= Codea =

Code editor for iPad

Editor of Codea version 2.0 on iOS 7

Codea.io is a code editor for iPad made by Two Lives Left. It is designed for prototyping visual ideas, primarily games and simulations. Finished projects can be exported directly from the app to Xcode. It is closely related to the Processing programming language, using many of the same methods for drawing functions as found in Processing.

== History ==
Two Lives Left was formed in 2009 by University of Adelaide PhD students Simeon Saëns, John Millard, and Dylan Sale.

Codea was released on the App Store in late 2011, making it one of the first iOS Lua editors. In April 2012, the first game programmed entirely on iPad using Codea was released on the App Store. In March 2014, Codea 2.0 was released, which added a 64-bit architecture, redesigned code editor, and various API improvements.

On October 4, 2017, version 2.5 was released, which added a 3D Voxel editing capability for the construction of 3D worlds. Loading of 3D models in Wavefront .obj file format was also added. In November 2020, the latest version of Codea was released, 3.2.8.
