= Victoria Heredia =

Mexican taekwondo practitioner

Victoria Tamez
Personal information
- Full name: Victoria Catarina Heredia Tamez
- Born: 28 May 1996 (age 30) General Terán, Nuevo Leon, Mexico
- Weight: 67 kg (148 lb)

Sport
- Country: Mexico
- Sport: Taekwondo
- Event: –67 kg
- Team: MEX
Medal record
Representing Mexico
Grand Prix
Bronze medal – third place	2018 Manchester	67 kg
Pan American Games
Silver medal – second place	2015 Toronto	67 kg
Bronze medal – third place	2023 Santiago	+67 kg
Pan Am Championships
Silver medal – second place	2018 Spokane	67 kg
Bronze medal – third place	2016 Queretaro	67 kg
Universiade
Silver medal – second place	2017 Taipei	67 kg
- Updated on 20 October 2018

Victoria Catarina Heredia Tamez (Note: In this Spanish name, the first or paternal surname is Heredia and the second or maternal family name is Tamez.) (born 28 May 1998) is a Mexican taekwondo athlete. She won the silver medal at the 2015 Pan Am Games on the women's 67 kg category.
