= Kevin Peraza =

American BMX freestyle competitor (born 1994)

Personal information
- Born: September 2, 1994 (age 31) Tucson, Arizona, U.S.

Sport
- Country: Mexico United States
- Sport: Freestyle BMX, Dirt jumping
- Rank: 2 X-games medals / Numerous FISE (Red Bull events, Vans Pro Cup....) medals / 2 × Simple Session champion
Medal record
Summer X Games
Representing United States
| Gold medal – first place | 2016 Austin | BMX Dirt |
| Gold medal – first place | 2019 Minneapolis | BMX Park |
| Gold medal – first place | 2021 California | BMX Park |
| Silver medal – second place | 2023 California | BMX Park |
| Bronze medal – third place | 2022 Chiba | BMX Park |

Kevin Peraza (born September 2, 1994) is an American BMX freestyle competitor who has represented Mexico and the United States internationally.

His father is an ex-BMX racing rider, and his three brothers, Victor, David and Eddie, are also BMX riders.

== Career ==
Peraza has won multiple medals at the FISE. In 2013, he won two third-place medals at Park and Spine. In 2014, he won a third-place medal in Park. In 2015, he won a second-place medal in Park.

In dirt biking, he won the Red Bull Dirt Conquers competition in 2014, and placed second place at the Mongoose Jam 2015 Dirt Competition.

Peraza has competed in four X Games, winning gold medals at the X Games Austin 2016 in the BMX Dirt event and X Games Minneapolis 2017 in BMX Park. He secured three top-ten finishes in BMX Park and two in BMX Dirt.

In 2013 and 2016, he won in the BMX Park Simple Sessions. In 2013, he won third place at the Play BMX Contest. In 2017, he won third place at the X-Knights. He has also won medals at Ultimate X, scoring third place in 2016 and 2019.

Later in his career, Kevin Peraza turned to BMX street riding and won several medals in Vans Pro Cup, attaining third place in 2017, fourth place in 2018, and a Best Trick award in 2019.

In 2019, he won multiple leaderboard events in the UCI BMX Supercross World Cup – such as the C1 in Cary; and qualified for the Olympics.

Kevin Peraza kicked off the 2023 season with renewed vigor by advancing to the final of the first date of the BMX Fresstyle World Cup (freestyle), which was held in Diriyah, Saudi Arabia.

Peraza achieved eighth place in the semifinal stage with a score of 85.52, after his two tours on the track and thus entering the group of the 12 best riders to the final, which took place on February 18, 2023, where the objective is to be placed among the six best in the modality. Peraza began his journey to the 2024 Summer Olympics.
