= Daniela Cruz =

Costa Rican footballer (born 1991)

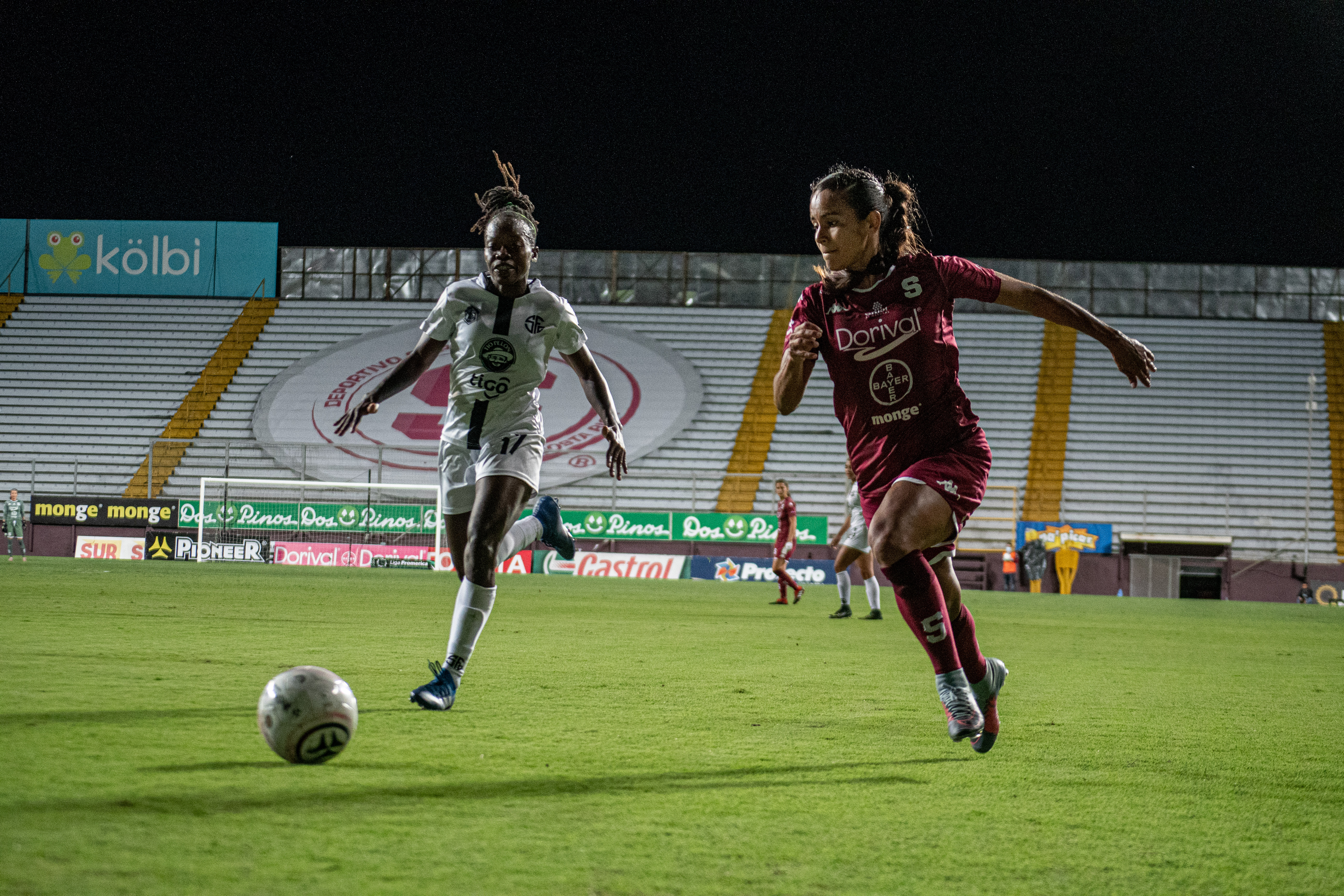

Personal information
- Full name: Daniela María Cruz Mejía
- Date of birth: 8 March 1991 (age 35)
- Place of birth: Tibás, Costa Rica
- Height: 1.61 m (5 ft 3 in)
- Position: Centre-back

College career
Years	Team	Apps	(Gls)
2010–2013	West Florida Argonauts		

Senior career*
Years	Team	Apps	(Gls)
2014–2015	Saprissa		
2015–2016	Red Star Belgrade		
2016–2019	Saprissa		
2019–2020	Espanyol	7	(0)
2020–2022	Saprissa	0	(0)
2023–2025	Atlas	40	(0)

International career^{‡}
2008	Costa Rica U17		
2009–2010	Costa Rica U20	11	(1)
2010–2024	Costa Rica	39	(1)
Medal record
Women's football
Representing Costa Rica
Pan American Games
Bronze medal – third place	2019 Lima	Team
- * Club domestic league appearances and goals as of 8 September 2019 ‡ National team caps and goals as of 11 October 2018

Daniela María Cruz Mejía (born 8 March 1991) is a Costa Rican footballer who played as a defender for Atlas.

== Career ==
Cruz made her professional debut with Sportek de Heredia where she won the second division championship and the promotion to the Costa Rica Women's Football Championship.

Later in 2010, she went to study to the United States, where she had the opportunity to play with West Florida Argonauts in NCAA Division II. She won the Division II championship with the same team in 2012.

After graduating from college in 2014, she came back to Costa Rica to play with Deportivo Saprissa FF, with Saprissa she also won the championship in 2014. Cruz won the Apertura 2015 with Saprissa and made a huge step in her career by signing with Red Star Belgrade in the Serbian First League with the option of extending her 1-year contract.

Unfortunately in 2016 her grandfather got sick so she returned to Costa Rica for three months, in her last match in Serbia she caught an injury which she had planned to treat in her home country, but the injury was so serious she had to pay for an operation with the help of her parents. Because of her injury, Red Star Belgrade didn't renew her contract, so Cruz went back to Costa Rica to play for Deportivo Saprissa FF. Last year she won the Clausura 2018 as the team captain. She was also the trainer of the U-13 female team of Saprissa.

Before leaving to Spain, Cruz also won the Apertura 2019 with Deportivo Saprissa FF, scoring an Olympic goal in the final against AD Moravia, where they tied 1-1 and then Saprissa won by penalties.

On June 5 of 2019, RCD Espanyol Femenino announced on their social media that Cruz signed with them for one season, she'll play alongside her Costa Rica teammate Katherine Alvarado.

== International career ==
At the age of 13, Cruz was called to the U-17 Costa Rica National Team squad, which eventually qualified to the 2008 FIFA U-17 Women's World Cup in New Zealand. In 2010, she had the opportunity to play in the 2010 FIFA U-20 Women's World Cup that was held in Germany, having achieved her second world cup as a very young and promising player for Costa Rica. Finally in 2014 with Cruz already playing for the senior team, Costa Rica Women's National Football Team achieved their first ever qualification to the FIFA Women's World Cup in a match against Trinidad & Tobago, which Cruz was part of. Costa Rica ended up finishing 3rd in their group of the 2015 FIFA Women's World Cup.

Ups and downs were to come for Cruz and her teammates in 2018, after she was part of the Costa Rica National Team that made history by winning a silver medal in the 2018 Central American and Caribbean Games which were held in Barranquilla, Colombia. But later that same year she was part of the squad that failed to reach the 2019 FIFA Women's World Cup after winning 8–0 against Cuba, but losing 1–0 and 1–3 against Jamaica and Canada.

Cruz has three world cups in her log book.

== Clubs ==
- Sportek de Heredia
- West Florida Argonauts
- Red Star Belgrade
- Deportivo Saprissa Fútbol Femenino
- RCD Espanyol Femenino

== See also ==
- List of women's footballers with 100 or more international caps
