= Wendy Acosta =

Costa Rican footballer (born 1989)

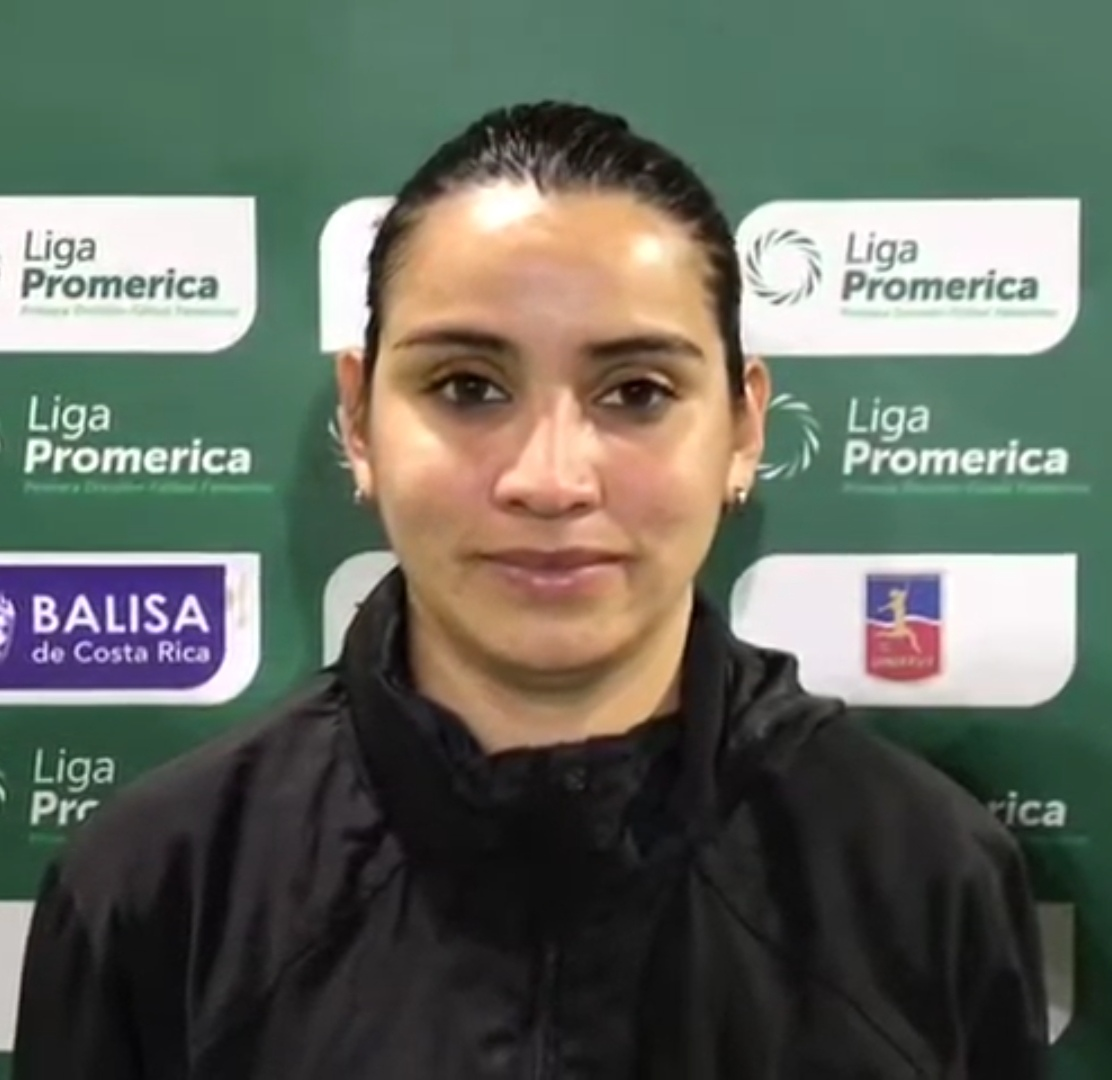

Personal information
- Full name: Wendy Patricia Acosta Salas
- Date of birth: 19 December 1989 (age 36)
- Place of birth: San Sebastián, Costa Rica
- Height: 1.65 m (5 ft 5 in)
- Position: Midfielder

Team information
- Current team: Herediano FF
- Number: 20

College career
Years	Team	Apps	(Gls)
- Universidad de Costa Rica
2012	VCU Rams		(9)

Senior career*
Years	Team	Apps	(Gls)
2013-2015	UD Moravia		
2016	UD Granadilla Tenerife Sur	13	(1)
2016-2018	UD Moravia		
2019-	Herediano		

International career
2007–2017	Costa Rica	59	(18)
- * Club domestic league appearances and goals

Wendy Patricia Acosta Salas (born 19 December 1989) is a Costa Rican footballer who plays as a midfielder for Herediano FF and the Costa Rica women's national football team.

== Career ==
=== University of Costa Rica ===
Acosta attended the University of Costa Rica.

=== International ===
On 28 April 2010, Acosta made her international debut against Honduras. On 7 October 2011, she scored her first ever international goal against El Salvador. In the following matches against Honduras and Guatemala, she again scored a goal in each match. Then on 22 January 2012, she scored a brace against Haiti. On 7 March, she scored a hat-trick against Belize, with goals in the twenty-sixth, forty-fourth and sixty-fifth minute during a match in which Costa Rica won 14–0. She would continue her scoring, as she found the net in consecutive matches against El Salvador and Panama.

On 16 March 2013, Acosta scored twice in a match against Nicaragua. There she found the net in the first half of the match, in the fourteenth and twentieth minute. Costa Rica won that match 4–0. She again scored in a 6–1 victory for Costa Rica against Martinique, finding the net in the thirty-second minute before she was substituted for Carol Sanchez in the sixty-second minute. Through victory in that match, Costa Rica was "one match away from" the 2015 FIFA Women's World Cup. On 5 March 2015, Acosta scored a single goal against Bosnia and Herzegovina, which helped Costa Rica win a match in the Istria Cup.

=== Club ===
In 2015, Acosta was invited for a trial by Swedish club AIK.

After scoring a goal, Acosta "always [points] to the sky" to remember her father, who died due to a heart ailment in 2011. She has also said that she plays football because her "dad played".

== Honours ==
Costa Rica

Winner

- Central American Games: 2013
