= Yirlania Arroyo =

Costa Rican footballer (born 1986)

Personal information
- Full name: Yirlania Arroyo Fonseca
- Date of birth: 28 May 1986 (age 40)
- Height: 1.68 m (5 ft 6 in)
- Position: Goalkeeper

Senior career*
Years	Team	Apps	(Gls)
- Arenal Coronado
2014	Sky Blue FC	0	(0)

International career^{‡}
2007–2015	Costa Rica	40	(0)
- * Club domestic league appearances and goals as of 06:19, 22 June 2015 (UTC) ‡ National team caps and goals as of 17:44, 18 June 2015 (UTC)

Yirlania Arroyo Fonseca (born 28 May 1986) is a Costa Rican international footballer who plays as a goalkeeper.

== Career ==
Arroyo won her first international cap in a match against Nicaragua on 20 October 2007, and went on to make 40 appearances for Costa Rica.

She has played club football for Arenal Coronado in Costa Rica and Sky Blue FC in the United States.
