= Andrey Fonseca =

Costa Rican cyclist (born 1993)

Personal information
- Born: 8 April 1993 (age 33)

Cycling career
- Sport: Cycling
- Discipline: Mountain bike
- Role: Rider

Andrey Fonseca (born 8 April 1993) is a Costa Rican cyclist. He competed in the cross-country event at the 2016 Summer Olympics.
