= Fabiola Sánchez =

Costa Rican footballer (born 1993)

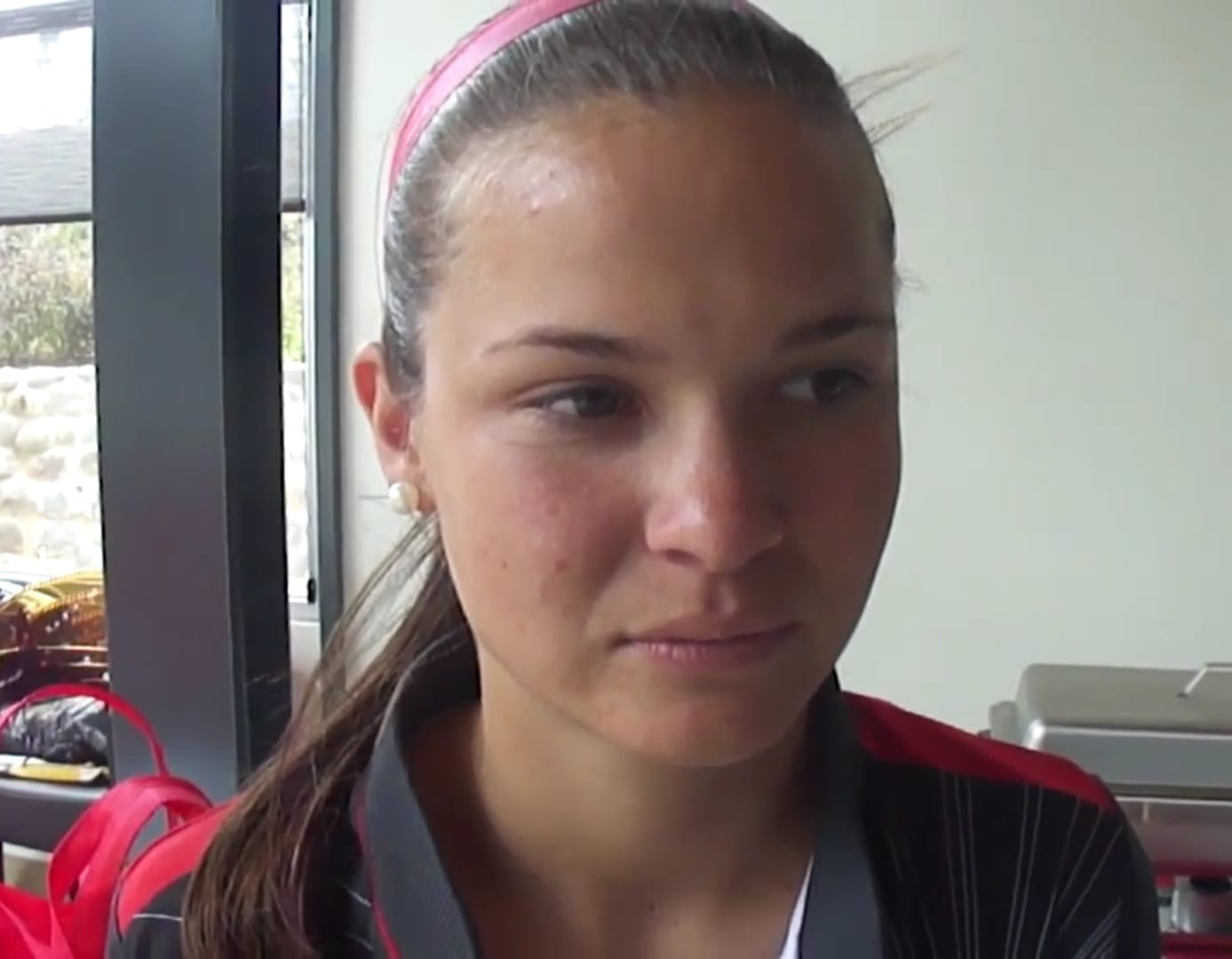
- 2015

Personal information
- Full name: Fabiola María Sánchez Jiménez
- Date of birth: 9 April 1993 (age 33)
- Place of birth: Alajuela, Costa Rica
- Height: 1.66 m (5 ft 5 in)
- Position: Midfielder

Team information
- Current team: Ramat HaSharon
- Number: 6

College career
Years	Team	Apps	(Gls)
2012–2015	Martin Methodist RedHawks		

Senior career*
Years	Team	Apps	(Gls)
2016	Speranza Osaka-Takatsuki		
2017	Kilmarnock		
2017–2019	Ramat HaSharon	46	(5)
2019–2020	CODEA-LDA		
2020–	Ramat HaSharon	0	(0)

International career^{‡}
2008–2010	Costa Rica U17	5	(1)
2009–2010	Costa Rica U20	10	(1)
2010–2020	Costa Rica	11	(3)
Medal record
Women's football
Representing Costa Rica
Pan American Games
Bronze medal – third place	2019 Lima	Team
- * Club domestic league appearances and goals ‡ National team caps and goals as of 17:48, 18 June 2015 (UTC)

Fabiola María Sánchez Jiménez (born 9 April 1993) is a Costa Rican footballer who plays as a midfielder for Israeli Ligat Nashim club F.C. Ramat HaSharon and the Costa Rica women's national team.

== Honours ==
Costa Rica

Winner

- Central American Games: 2013
