= Carol Sánchez =

Costa Rican footballer (born 1986)

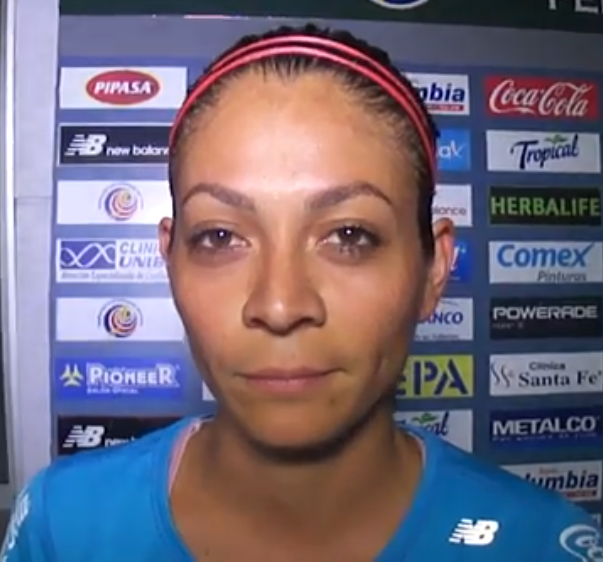
- In a 2015 interview

Personal information
- Full name: Carol Sánchez Cruz
- Date of birth: 16 April 1986 (age 40)
- Place of birth: Nicoya, Costa Rica
- Height: 1.69 m (5 ft 6 1/2 in)
- Position: Defender

College career
Years	Team	Apps	(Gls)
2011	VCU Rams		

Senior career*
Years	Team	Apps	(Gls)
- UD Moravia
2017	Independiente Santa Fe		
????-2024	Sporting Football Club (women)		

International career^{‡}
2007–2023	Costa Rica	36	(2)
Medal record
Women's football
Representing Costa Rica
Pan American Games
Bronze medal – third place	2019 Lima	Team
- * Club domestic league appearances and goals ‡ National team caps and goals as of 17:02, 18 June 2015 (UTC)

Carol Sánchez Cruz (born 16 April 1986) is a Costa Rican former footballer who played as a defender. She competed at the 2015 FIFA Women's World Cup in Canada.
