= Christer Egerstrom =

Mexican equestrian

Personal information
- Full name: Cristóbal Egerstrom Ericksson
- Nationality: Mexican / Costa Rican
- Born: 22 November 1956 (age 68)
Medal record
Equestrian
Representing Mexico
Pan American Games
Gold medal – first place	1995 Mar del Plata	Team dressage
Silver medal – second place	1983 Caracas	Team dressage
Bronze medal – third place	1987 Indianapolis	Team dressage
Bronze medal – third place	1991 Havana	Team dressage
Representing Costa Rica
Central American Games
Gold medal – first place	2013 San José	Team dressage

Cristóbal Egerstrom Ericksson (Note: In this Spanish name, the first or paternal surname is Egerstrom and the second or maternal family name is Ericksson.) (born 22 November 1956) is a Mexican-born equestrian, who has been competing for Costa Rica since 2013. He competed in two events at the 1984 Summer Olympics.
