= Lixy Rodríguez =

Costa Rican footballer (born 1990)

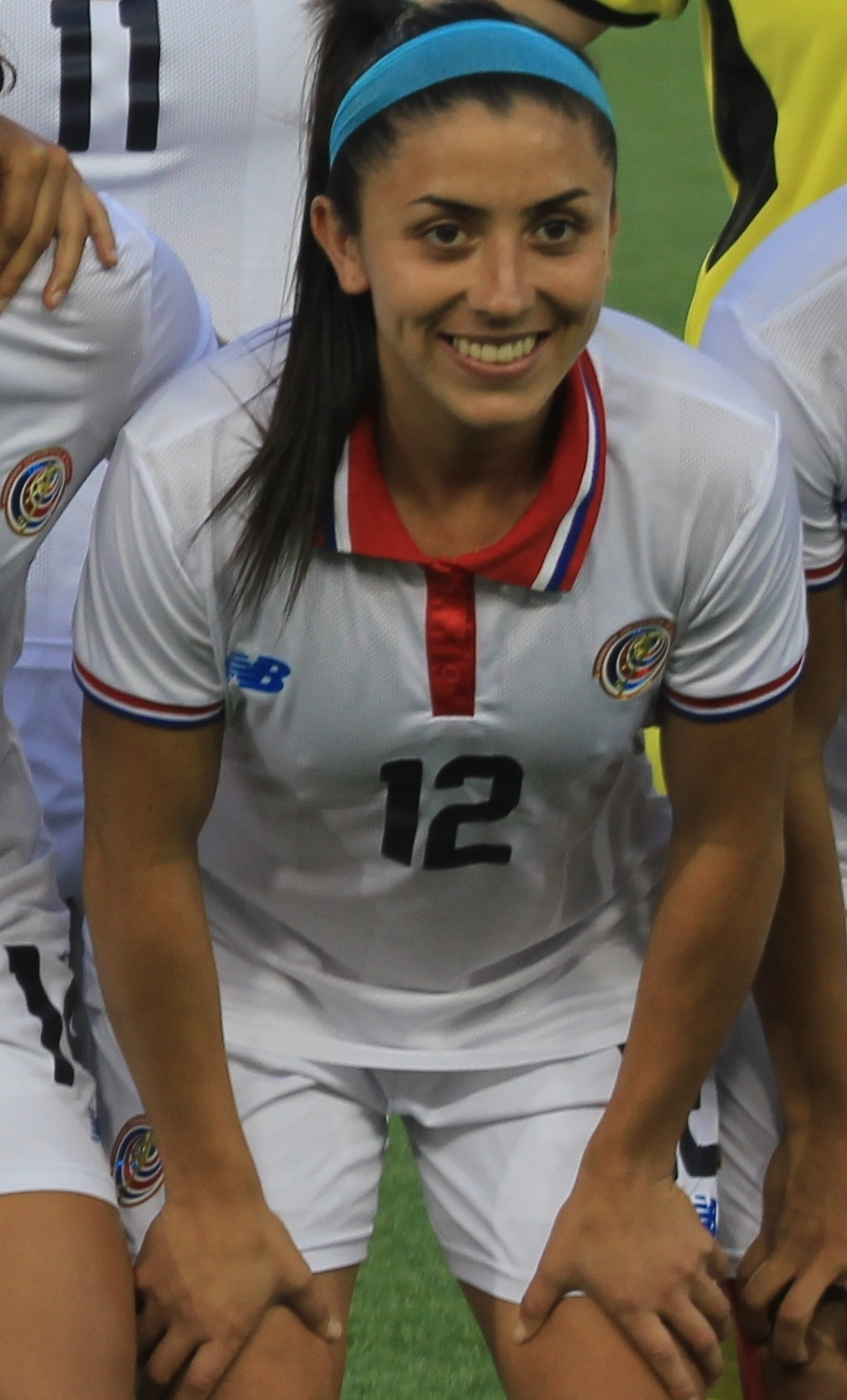
- Rodríguez with Costa Rica in 2015

Personal information
- Full name: Lixy María Rodríguez Zamora
- Date of birth: 4 November 1990 (age 36)
- Place of birth: Grecia, Costa Rica
- Height: 1.52 m (5 ft 0 in)
- Position: Right back

Senior career*
Years	Team	Apps	(Gls)
- UCEM Alajuela
2015–2016	Santa Teresa	15	(1)
2017–2018	Codea		
2018–2019	Tacón	0	(0)
2019–2022	Alajuelense		
2022–2025	León	29	(0)

International career^{‡}
2011–	Costa Rica	50	(2)
Medal record
Women's football
Representing Costa Rica
Pan American Games
Bronze medal – third place	2019 Lima	Team
- * Club domestic league appearances and goals as of 31 March 2019 ‡ National team caps and goals as of 17:28, 18 June 2015 (UTC)

Lixy María Rodríguez Zamora (born 4 November 1990) is a Costa Rican footballer who plays as an attacking midfielder for Liga MX Femenil side León and the Costa Rica women's national team.

== International goals ==
No.	Date	Venue	Opponent	Score	Result	Competition
1.	22 September 2021	Estadio Nacional, San José, Costa Rica	Panama	2–0	3–2	Friendly

== Honours ==
Costa Rica

- Central American Games: 2013

== See also ==
- List of women's footballers with 100 or more international caps
