= Leonardo Chacón =

Costa Rican triathlete

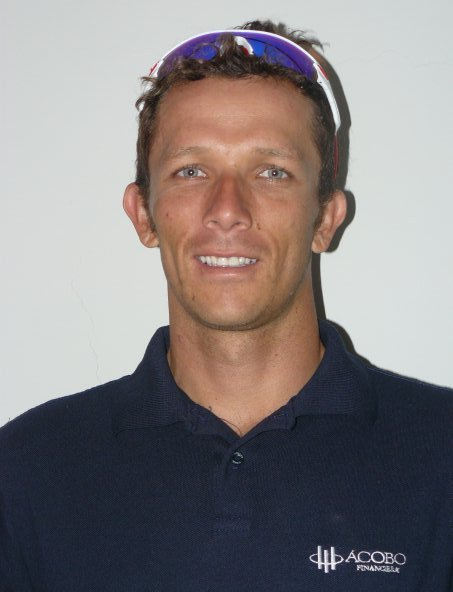

Personal information
- Full name: Leonardo Chacón Corrales
- Nationality: Costa Rican
- Born: June 29, 1984 (age 41) Liberia, Costa Rica

Sport
- Country: Costa Rica
- Sport: Triathlon

Leonardo Chacón Corrales (born 29 June 1984) is a Costa Rican triathlete.

At the 2012 Summer Olympics men's triathlon, he placed 48th.
