= Katherine Alvarado =

Costa Rican footballer (born 1991)

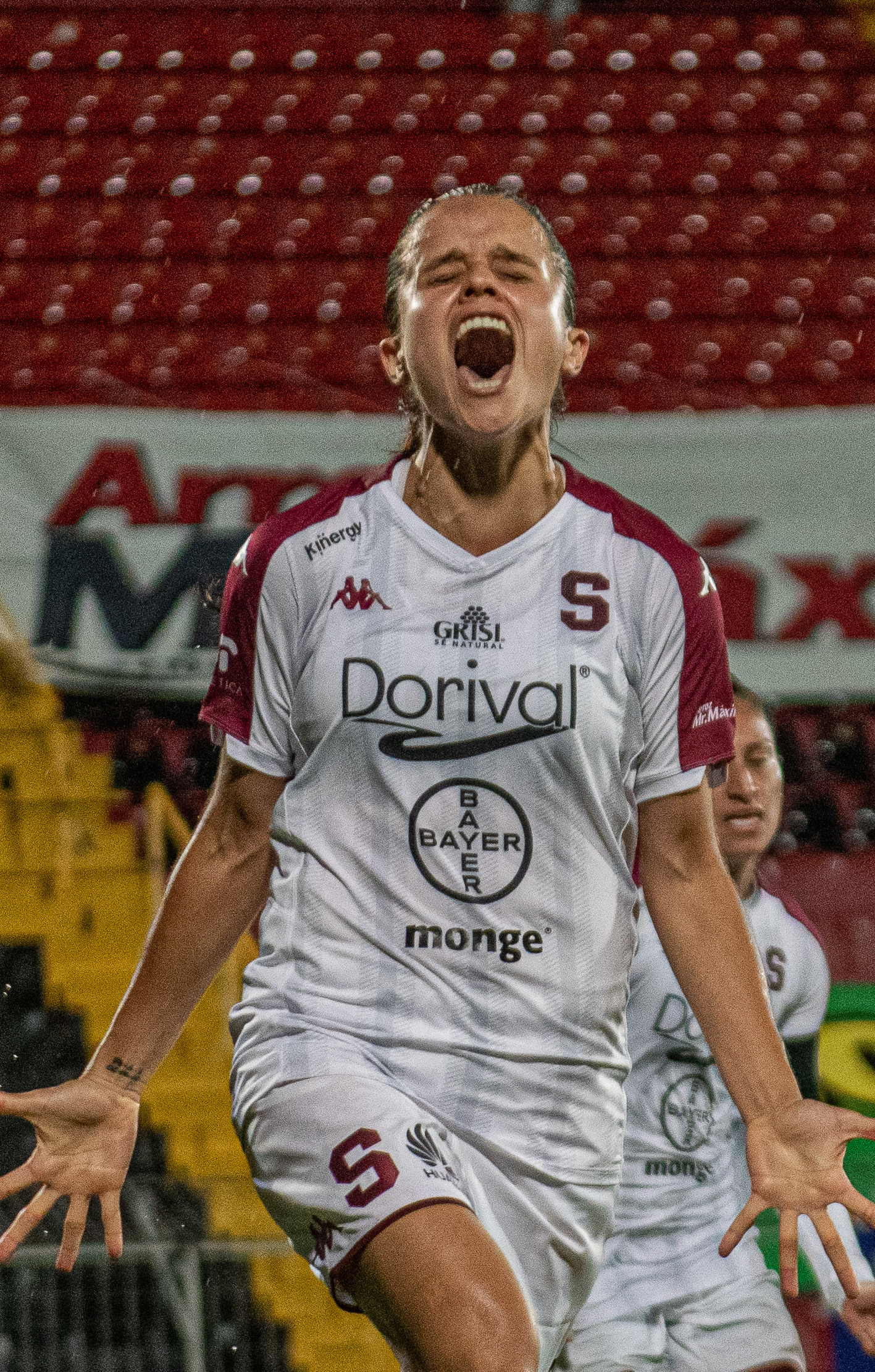

Personal information
- Full name: Katherine María Alvarado Aguilar
- Date of birth: 11 April 1991 (age 35)
- Place of birth: Guatuso, Costa Rica
- Height: 1.64 m (5 ft 5 in)
- Position: Midfielder

Senior career*
Years	Team	Apps	(Gls)
2012–2017	Deportivo Saprissa		
2018	Patriotas de Boyacá		
2018–2020	Espanyol	40	(1)
2020–2024	Saprissa		
2024-2025	Millonarios		
2025-	Saprissa		

International career^{‡}
2008	Costa Rica U17		
2009–2010	Costa Rica U20	12	(6)
2010–	Costa Rica	75	(20)
Medal record
Women's football
Representing Costa Rica
Pan American Games
Bronze medal – third place	2019 Lima	Team
- * Club domestic league appearances and goals as of 18 January 2020 ‡ National team caps and goals as of 3 February 2020

Katherine María Alvarado Aguilar (born 11 April 1991) is a Costa Rican footballer who plays as a midfielder for the Costa Rica women's national team.

== Career ==
Alvarado has played football for clubs in Colombia, Costa Rica and Spain. While playing for Saprissa FF in March 2021, Alvarado scored her 100th competitive goal at club level.

== Honours ==
Costa Rica

Winner

- Central American Games: 2013

== See also ==
- List of women's footballers with 100 or more international caps
