= Katherine Alvarado (taekwondo) =

Costa Rican taekwondo practitioner

Personal information
- Nationality: Costa Rica
- Born: Katherine Alvarado Araya; 27 March 1988 (age 38) San José, Costa Rica

Sport
- Country: Costa Rica
- Sport: Taekwondo

Achievements and titles
- Highest world ranking: 13 (-67 kg category)
Medal record
Women's taekwondo
Representing Costa Rica
Pan American Taekwondo Championships
Silver medal – second place	2014 Aguascalientes	-67 kg
- Updated on 22 April 2016

Katherine Alvarado Araya (born 3 March 1988) is a Costa Rican taekwondo practitioner.

She competed in the -67 kg event at the 2014 Pan American Taekwondo Championships in Aguascalientes, Mexico. According to the Costa Rican Olympic Committee, her best historical ranking in the -67 kg category was at 13th place worldwide. In 2019, she planned to compete in the 2019 World Taekwondo Grand Prix in Japan.

In March 2020, Alvarado participated in the Pan American Qualification Tournament in Heredia, ultimately reaching quarterfinals before elimination.
