= Ford =

Ford commonly refers to:

- Ford Motor Company, an automobile manufacturer founded by Henry Ford
- Ford (crossing), a shallow crossing on a river

Ford may also refer to:

== Ford Motor Company ==
- Henry Ford (1863–1947), founder of the Ford Motor Company
- Ford Foundation, established by Henry and Edsel
- Ford Australia
- Ford Brasil
- Changan Ford
- Ford Motor Company of Canada, Canadian subsidiary
- Ford of Britain
- Ford of Europe, the successor of British, German and Irish subsidiaries
- Ford Germany
- Ford India
- Ford Lio Ho
- Ford New Zealand
- Ford Motor Company Philippines
- Ford Romania
- Ford SAF, the French subsidiary between 1916 and 1954
- Ford Motor Company of South Africa
- Fordson, the tractor and truck manufacturing arm of the Ford Motor Company
- Ford Vietnam
- Ford World Rally Team (aka Ford Motor Co. Team prior to 2005), Ford Motor Company's full factory World Rally Championship team (1978–2012)
- Ford Performance
- Henry Ford & Son Ltd, Ireland
- List of Ford vehicles, models referred to as Ford

== Arts and entertainment ==
- The Ford (painting), 1644, by Claude Lorrain
- Ford, a religious figure in Aldous Huxley's Brave New World
- Ford Fairlane, a character in The Adventures of Ford Fairlane named after an automobile manufactured by the Ford Motor Company
- Ford Prefect (character), in Douglas Adams' The Hitchhiker's Guide to the Galaxy
- Kira Ford, a Power Rangers Dino Thunder character

== Businesses and organizations ==
- Edward E. Ford Foundation, American education philanthropy group
- Ford Hospital and Research Centre, Bihar, India
- Ford Hotel, a historic hotel in central Toronto, Ontario, Canada
- Ford Instrument Company
- Ford Library (disambiguation), several libraries
- Ford Models, an American modeling agency
- The Ford Meter Box Company, an American manufacturer
- Ford's Theatre, Washington D.C., U.S.
- Ford Tractor Company, a manufacturer of tractors in 1916–17, not related to Ford Motor Company
- Forum for the Restoration of Democracy – Asili, a Kenyan political party
- Forum for the Restoration of Democracy – Kenya, a Kenyan political party
- Forum for the Restoration of Democracy – People, a Kenyan political party

== People ==
- Ford (surname), including a list of people with the name
  - Gerald Ford (1913–2006), 38th president of the United States from 1974 to 1977
  - John Ford (1894–1973), American filmmaker

=== People with the given name ===
- Ford Madox Brown (1821–1893), English painter
- Ford Carr, Kansas state legislator
- Ford Madox Ford (1873–1939), English author
- Ford C. Frick, (1894–1978), American sportswriter and baseball executive
- Ford E. Stinson (1914–1989), Louisiana state legislator
- Ford Quint Elvidge (1892–1980), second Civilian Governor of Guam
- Ford Rainey (1908–2005), American actor

== Places ==
=== Antarctica ===
- Ford Ice Piedmont
- Ford Island (Windmill Islands)
- Ford Massif
- Ford Nunataks
- Ford Peak
- Ford Ranges
- Ford Rock
- Ford Spur

=== Canada ===
- Ford, Newfoundland and Labrador

=== United Kingdom ===
- Ford, Argyll
- Ford, Buckinghamshire
- Ford, Derbyshire

- Ford, Chivelstone, a hamlet in South Hams, Devon
- Ford, Plymouth, Devon, a suburb
- Ford, East Devon, a location in Devon
- Ford, Holbeton, a location in South Hams, Devon
- Ford, Torridge, a location in Devon
- Ford, Gloucestershire
- Ford, Herefordshire
- Ford, Merseyside
  - Ford (ward)
  - Ford railway station (Merseyside)
- Ford, Northumberland
- Ford, Pembrokeshire, a parish of Hayscastle
- Ford, Shropshire
- Ford, Mendip, a location in Somerset
- Ford, Somerset West and Taunton, a location
- Ford, Staffordshire, a location
- Ford Estate, Sunderland, Tyne and Wear
- Ford, West Sussex
  - Ford railway station
  - HM Prison Ford
- Ford, North Wiltshire
- Ford, Salisbury, a hamlet of Laverstock

=== United States ===
- Ford, Georgia
- Ford, Kansas
- Ford, Kentucky
- Ford, Virginia
- Ford, Washington
- Ford, Wisconsin
- Ford Block, a historic commercial building in Oneonta, Otsego County, New York
- Ford Center (Evansville), an indoor arena in Evansville, Indiana
- Ford Field, a stadium in Detroit, Michigan
- Ford Hospital (Nebraska), active in the 1920s, Omaha, Nebraska
- Ford Island, Hawaii

=== Elsewhere ===
- Ford, County Wexford, Ireland, a village

== Sports ==
- Ford Cup (disambiguation), in junior hockey
- Ford Cup (tennis)
- Ford F.C., a football club in Northern Ireland

== Other uses ==
- Ford (mango), a cultivar from Florida
- Ford circle, in mathematics
- Ford v Quebec (AG), a landmark Supreme Court of Canada case on freedom of expression
- Douglas F4D Skyray, nicknamed Ford, an American jet fighter of the 1950s and 1960s
- USS Ford, the name of several ships
- Gerald R. Ford-class aircraft carrier, or Ford-class, a group of American ships
  - USS Gerald R. Ford, the lead ship of the USS Gerald R. Ford class aircraft carrier

== See also ==
- Fjord (disambiguation)
- Forde (disambiguation)
- Fords (disambiguation)
- Henry Ford (disambiguation)
- Fforde, a surname
- Ford High School (disambiguation)
- Ford Theatre (disambiguation)
- Ford & Lopatin, an American music group
- The Henry Ford, a museum complex on part of Henry Ford's estate in Dearborn, Michigan
- Tirtha (Jainism) (Sanskrit for "ford")
  - Tirthankara (Sanskrit for "ford-maker")
