= John Ford (disambiguation) =

John Ford (1894–1973) was an American film director who won four Academy Awards.

John or Johnny Ford may also refer to:

== Clergymen ==
- John Ford (minister) (1767–1826), politician and Methodist leader in South Carolina and Mississippi Territory
- John Ford (bishop) (born 1952), Bishop of Plymouth, 2005 to 2013
- John C. Ford (1902–1989), American Jesuit moral theologian

== Public officials ==
- John Ford (died 1407), MP for Tavistock
- John Ford (fl. 1410–1426), MP for Dorset, Shaftesbury and Melcombe Regis
- John Ford (before 1395–after 1416), MP for Colchester in 1416
- John Salmon Ford (1815–1897), Texas politician known as "Rip" Ford
- John Anson Ford (1883–1983), California politician
- John Featherstone Ford, Ontario politician
- John Joseph Ford (1907–1982), California jurist
- John Meredith Ford (1923–1995), Guyanese politician
- John Ford (diplomat) (1922–2018), British diplomat
- John Ford (Tennessee politician) (born 1942), American legislator
- Johnny Ford (born 1942), Alabama's first African-American mayor
- John Ford (New York politician) (1862–1941), New York judge and politician
- John Ford (Oklahoma politician), Oklahoma politician
- John A. Ford (1811–1895), Minnesota politician

== Literary figures ==
- John Ford (dramatist) (1586 – c. 1640), English playwright and poet
- John M. Ford (1957–2006), American science fiction writer and poet

== Entrepreneurs ==
- John Baptiste Ford (1811–1903), U.S. businessman, founder of Pittsburgh Plate Glass Company
- John Gardner Ford (born 1951), business executive, son of U.S. President Gerald Ford
- John T. Ford (1829–1894), owner and manager of the theater where Lincoln was assassinated

== Sports ==
- John Ford (American football coach) (before 1880 – after 1906), Marquette University football coach
- John Ford (baseball) (1894–1947), American Negro league baseball player
- John Ford (footballer, born 1893) (1893–1917), Scottish footballer
- John Ford (footballer, born 1931), Australian rules footballer for Fitzroy
- John Ford (footballer, born 1932), Australian rules footballer for North Melbourne
- John Ford (quarterback), American football player
- John Ford (wide receiver) (born 1966), American football player
- John Ford (rugby union), Welsh international rugby union player

== Other people ==
- John Ford (musician) (born 1948), English singer, songwriter and guitarist
- John Ford (Royal Navy officer) (1738–1796), British admiral
- John Alexander Ford, Scottish landscape artist
- John D. Ford (1840–1918), American naval officer
- John J. Ford (CIA) (1923–1993), American CIA official and cyberneticist
- John J. Ford Jr. (1924–2005), American numismatist
- John M. T. Ford, English general practitioner and medical historian
- John Simpson Ford (1866–1944), Scottish industrial chemist and microbiologist
- John Bevan Ford (1930–2005), New Zealand Māori artist and educator
- John Patton Ford (born 1981), American film director and screenwriter

=== Other uses ===
- Johnford, a Taiwanese industrial tool manufacturer.
- USS John D. Ford, a Clemson-class destroyer in the United States Navy

== See also ==
- Jon Ford (disambiguation)
- Jack Ford (disambiguation)
- John Forde (disambiguation)
- John of Ford (c. 1140–1214), abbot of the Dorset Cistercian monastery Forde Abbey
- Ford (surname)
