= Ford (surname) =

The surname Ford has several origins. In some cases it originated as a name for someone who lived near a ford, and is therefore derived from the Old English and Middle English ford. In some cases, the surname is derived from places named Ford. Examples of such places include Ford in Northumberland (from Old English ford), a place in Somerset, Ford in Shropshire (from Old English ford), Ford in West Sussex (from Old English ford), and Forde in Dorset.

In other cases, the surname is sometimes an anglicised form of three Irish surnames. Two such surnames are Mac Giolla na Naomh, a name meaning "son of Gilla na Naomh"; and Mac Conshámha, a name meaning "son of Conshnámha". These surnames were anglicised to Ford because their final syllable was once erroneously thought to be the Irish áth ("ford"). Another Irish surname anglicised to Ford is Ó Fuartháin, a name meaning "descendant of Fuarthán". The personal name Fuartháin, derived from the Irish fuar ("cold"), was once taken to represent the Irish fuarathán ("cold little ford"), which led the name to be erroneously translated as "ford". The former two Irish surnames were borne by septs centred in the province of Connacht, whilst the latter was borne by a sept centred in County Cork (in the province of Munster).

In some cases the surname Ford is an americanized form of like-sounding Jewish surnames, or else a translated form of the German Fürth. Early instances of the surname Ford include de la forda in the eleventh century, æt Fordan in the twelfth-century, de la Forthe in the thirteenth-century, and Foorde and de Furd in the fifteenth century. The surname Ford, when found in Ireland, may be of English or Irish origin since many Ford families have immigrated to Ireland at various times in history. For example, a particular noted family of the name in County Meath emigrated from Devon in the fourteenth century. In Ireland, birth records for the year 1890 reveal that the surname Ford was much less common than the variant Forde (154 births compared to only 39).

== A ==
- Aiden Ford, a fictional character from the television show Stargate Atlantis
- Alan Ford (actor) (born 1938), English actor
- Alan Ford (swimmer) (1923–2008), American swimmer
- Alan Ford (comics), Italian comics character
- Aleem Ford (born 1997), American-Puerto Rican basketball player
- Aleksander Ford (1908–1980), Polish film director
- Alphonso Ford (1971–2004), American basketball player
- Andrew Ford (disambiguation), several people
- Andy Ford (born 1954), English association football player and manager
- Anna Ford (born 1943), British journalist and newsreader
- Arthur Ford (disambiguation), several people

== B ==
- Ben Ford (baseball) (born 1975), American baseball player
- Ben Ford (chef) (born 1966), American chef
- Ben Ford (politician) (1925–2022), British politician
- Betty Ford (1918–2011), wife of former United States president Gerald Ford, and founder of the Betty Ford Center
- Boris Ford (1917–1998), Indian-born British literary critic, writer, editor and educationist
- Brian J. Ford (born 1939), English independent scientist
- Bruce Ford (disambiguation), several people
- Budd S. Ford (1840–1879), American politician from Maryland
- Byington Ford (1890–1985), American, Pebble Beach and Carmel Valley developer, aviator, son of Tirey L. Ford

== C ==
- Carole Ann Ford (born 1940), English actress
- Cheryl Ford (born 1981), American basketball player
- Christine Blasey Ford (born 1966), American clinical psychology professor
- Christopher Ford, American screenwriter
- Clare Ford (1828–1899), English diplomat
- Clay Ford (1938–2013), American politician
- Clementine Ford (born 1979), American actress
- Clementine Ford (writer) (born 1981), Australian writer
- Clint Ford (born 1976), American actor and voice-over artist
- Clinton Ford (singer) (1931–2009), British singer
- Clinton B. Ford (1913–1992), American investor, musician and astronomer
- Cody Ford (born 1997), American football player
- Colin Ford (born 1996), American actor and voice actor
- Colin Ford (curator) (born 1934), British history of photography and museum director
- Colt Ford (born 1969), American Hick-Hop Artist
- Colton Ford (1962–2025), American singer and actor
- Constance Ford (1923–1993), American actress and model
- Curt Ford (born 1960), American baseball player

== D ==
- David Ford (actor) (1925–1983), American actor
- David Ford (footballer) (born 1945), English footballer
- David Ford (kayaker) (born 1967), Canadian whitewater slalom kayaker
- David Ford (musician) (born 1978), British singer-songwriter
- David Ford (politician) born 1951, former Leader of the Alliance Party of Northern Ireland, and Minister for Justice.
- David F. Ford (born 1948), Anglican theologian
- David Robert Ford (1935–2017), British soldier and diplomat, former Chief Secretary of Hong Kong
- Dean Ford (1946–2018), stage name of Thomas McAleese, Scottish singer and songwriter, member of the band Marmalade
- Debbie Ford (1955–2013), American self-help writer
- Debra Ford, American colorectal surgeon and academic administrator
- Desmond Ford (1929–2019), Australian Christian speaker and author
- Don Ford (born 1952), American basketball player
- Donald Ford (born 1944), Scottish footballer
- Donald E. Ford (1921–1965), American science fiction editor
- Doug Ford (born 1964), current Premier of Ontario
- Doug Ford Sr. (1933–2006), Canadian politician

== E ==
- E. B. Ford (1901–1988), British ecological geneticist
- Edgar Ford (1876–1943), English cricketer
- Edsel Ford (1893–1943), American businessman, president of Ford Motor Company, son of Henry Ford
- Eileen Ford (1922–2014), American model agency executive and co-founder of Ford Models
- Elena Ford (born 1966), American director within the Ford Motor Company, great-great-granddaughter of Henry Ford
- Emile Ford (1937–2016), West Indian-born musician and sound engineer

== F ==
- Ford Madox Ford (1873–1939), English novelist and publisher
- Francis Ford (cricketer) (1866–1940), English cricketer
- Francis Ford Coppola (born 1939), American film director, producer, and screenwriter
- Frankie Ford (1939–2015), American singer
- Franklin Lewis Ford (1920–2003), American historian
- Fred Ford (American football) (1938–2021), American football halfback
- Frederick W. Ford (1909–1986), American Chairman of the Federal Communications Commission

== G ==
- Gene Ford (1881–1973), American baseball player
- Gene Ford (pitcher, born 1912) (died 1970), American baseball player
- George Henry Ford (1808–1876), South African natural history illustrator working in Britain
- G. M. Ford (born 1945), American author
- Gerald Ford (1913–2006), 38th president of the United States
- Gerald J. Ford (born 1944), American banker
- Gerard W. Ford (1924–2008), American businessman who co-founded Ford Modeling Agency
- Gina Ford (born c. 1960), British writer on parenting methods
- Glenn Ford (1916–2006), Canadian-American actor
- Glyn Ford (born 1950), British politician
- Gordon Onslow Ford (1912–2003), British artist
- G. Sarsfield Ford (1933–2013), American jurist
- Greg Ford (disambiguation), multiple people

== H ==
- Harold Ford Sr. (born 1945), American politician
- Harold Ford Jr. (born 1970), American politician
- Harriet Ford (1863–1949), American actress and playwright
- Harrison Ford (born 1942), American actor
- Harrison Ford (silent film actor) (1884–1957), American silent film actor
- Henry Ford (1863–1947), American industrialist, founder of the Ford Motor Company
  - For others, see Henry Ford (disambiguation)
- Holden Ford, a fictional character from psychological thriller Mindhunter
- Hugh Alastair Ford (born 1946), Australian ornithologist

== I ==
- Isaiah Ford (born 1996), American football player

== J ==
- Jack Ford (journalist), American TV reporter and host
- Jack Ford (American politician) (1947–2015), American educator and politician
- "Jack" John Gardner Ford (born 1952), American businessman and politician, son of Gerald Ford
- Jaclyn Ford, American politician
- JaMeesia Ford (born 2005), American sprinter
- James Ford (pirate) (1775–1833), Kentucky criminal gang leader
- James W. Ford (1893–1957), African American politician and Communist Party USA vice presidential candidate
- Jaylan Ford (born 2001), American football player
- Jeremiah D. M. Ford (1873–1958), American college professor at Harvard
- Jeremy Ford (chef) (born 1985), American chef
- Jerome Ford (born 1999), American football player
- Joe Ford (disambiguation), multiple people
- John Ford (disambiguation), multiple people
- Jonathan Ford (disambiguation), multiple people
- Jordan Ford (born 1998), American basketball player
- Julian Ralph Ford (1932–1987), Australian ornithologist

== K ==
- Kate Ford (born 1976), English actress
- Keith Ford (born 1994), American football player
- Kelly J. Ford, American novelist
- Ken Ford (American football) (born 1936), American football player
- Ken Ford (violinist) (born 1968), American jazz violinist
- Ken Ford (sculptor) (1930–2018), British sculptor
- Kenneth M. Ford (born 1955), American computer scientist
- Kenneth W. Ford (businessman) (1908–1997), American businessman who established Roseburg Forest Products
- Kenneth W. Ford (1926–2025), American physicist, teacher and author
- Kira Ford, a fictional character from Power Rangers Dino Thunder.

== L ==
- L. R. Ford Jr. (1927–2017), American mathematician
- Lalatina Dustiness Ford, a fictional character from the light novel and anime KonoSuba
- Larry Ford (American football) (born 1988), American football player
- Lester R. Ford (1886–1967), American mathematician
- Len Ford (1926–1972), American professional football player
- Lew Ford (born 1976), American professional baseball player
- Lita Ford (born 1958), British-born singer
- Loretta Ford (1920–2025), American nurse
- Louis Ford (1845–?), English businessman, football administrator and referee
- Louis Ford (footballer) (1914–1980), Welsh footballer
- Louise Ford, British comedian and actress
- Louise Ford (film editor), British film editor
- Luke Ford (born 1981), Canadian-Australian actor

== M ==
- Malcolm Webster Ford (1862–1902), American athlete and journalist
- Mark Ford (footballer) (born 1975), English footballer
- Melbourne H. Ford (1849–1891), U.S. Representative from Michigan
- Melyssa Ford (born 1976), Canadian model and actress
- Michael Ford (disambiguation), several people
- Mike Ford (disambiguation), several people
- Mick Ford (born 1957), British actor and playwright
- Monica Ford, American socialite

== N ==
- Nick Ford (born 1999), American football player

== P ==
- Paris Ford (born 1998), American football player
- Parker Ford (ice hockey) (born 2000), American ice hockey player
- Patricia Ford (disambiguation), multiple people
- Patrick Ford (disambiguation), multiple people
- Paul Ford (1901–1976), American actor
- Paul Leicester Ford (1865–1902), American novelist
- Penny Ford (born 1964), American singer
- Poona Ford (born 1995), American football player

== R ==
- Richard Ford (disambiguation), several people, including:
  - Richard Ford (born 1944), American writer
- Robben Ford (born 1951), American guitarist
- Robert Ford (disambiguation), several people
- Rowan Ford (1998–2007), American murder victim
- Rudy Ford (born 1994), American football player
- Russ Ford (1883–1960), American baseball player
- Russell Ford (born 1983), Australian hockey player
- Ryan Ford (disambiguation), several people

== S ==
- Sallie Rochester Ford (1828–1910), American writer, newspaper editor
- Seabury Ford (1801–1855), American politician
- Seth Porter Ford (1817–1866), American physician in the Kingdom of Hawaii
- Simon Ford (born 1981), English footballer
- Stanley H. Ford (1877–1961), United States Army General
- Steven Ford (born 1956), American actor, son of Gerald Ford
- Susan Ford (born 1957), American author, photojournalist, daughter of Gerald Ford

== T ==
- T. J. Ford (born 1983), NBA basketball player
- Tennessee Ernie Ford (1919–1991), American recording artist and television host
- Sir Theodore Ford (1829–1920), Chief Justice of the Straits Settlements
- Thomas Mikal Ford (1962–2016), American actor
- Tim Ford (politician) (1951–2015), Mississippi politician
- Tirey L. Ford (1857–1928), California politician and a novelist
- T-Model Ford (c. 1923–2013), American musician
- Todd Ford (born 1984), Canadian ice hockey goaltender
- Tom Ford (born 1961), American fashion designer
- Tony Ford (footballer, born 1944), English footballer
- Tony Ford (footballer, born 1959), English footballer
- Trent Ford (born 1979), British American actor and model
- Trevor Ford (1923–2003), Welsh footballer
- Trevor D. Ford, British geologist

== V ==
- Vicky Ford (born 1967), British politician

== W ==
- Wallace Ford (1898–1966), American actor
- Walter Burton Ford (1874–1971), American mathematician
- Walton Ford (born 1960), American watercolor painter
- Wanda Ford, American former basketball player
- Wayne Adam Ford (born 1961), American serial killer
- Wendell H. Ford (1924–2015), American politician
- Whitey Ford (1928–2020), American baseball player
- Will Ford (born 1986), American football player
- Willa Ford (born 1981), American singer-songwriter
- William Clay Ford Jr. (born 1957), American businessman, chairman of Ford Motor Company, great-grandson of Henry Ford
- William Prince Ford (1803–1866), Louisiana preacher and farmer, first slave owner of Solomon Northup
- Worthington C. Ford (1858–1941), American historian, librarian at the Library of Congress and Brown University

== Z ==
- Zane Ford, American professional pickleball player

== See also ==
- Ford (disambiguation)
- Forde (surname)
- Fforde
