= List of United Kingdom locations: Fo-Foz =

The United Kingdom

This is part of the list of United Kingdom locations: a gazetteer of place names in the United Kingdom showing each place's locality and geographical coordinates.

== Fo ==
=== Foa-Foo ===
| Location | Locality | Coordinates (links to map & photo sources) | OS grid reference |
|---|---|---|---|
| Foals Green | Suffolk | 52.29°N 01.29°E | TM2571 |
| Fobbing | Essex | 51.52°N 00.46°E | TQ7184 |
| Fochabers | Moray | 57.60°N 03.10°W | NJ3458 |
| Fochriw | Caerphilly | 51.73°N 03.30°W | SO1005 |
| Fockerby | North Lincolnshire | 53.66°N 00.73°W | SE8419 |
| Fodderstone Gap | Norfolk | 52.64°N 00.43°E | TF6508 |
| Fodderty | Highland | 57.59°N 04.49°W | NH5159 |
| Foddington | Somerset | 51.05°N 02.60°W | ST5829 |
| Fodragaigh | Western Isles | 57.38°N 07.25°W | NF842453 |
| Foel | Powys | 52.68°N 03.49°W | SH9911 |
| Foel-gastell | Carmarthenshire | 51.80°N 04.11°W | SN5414 |
| Foggathorpe | East Riding of Yorkshire | 53.82°N 00.86°W | SE7537 |
| Foggbrook | Stockport | 53.39°N 02.12°W | SJ9289 |
| Fogla Skerry | Shetland Islands | 60.33°N 01.75°W | HU138609 |
| Fogo | Scottish Borders | 55.73°N 02.36°W | NT7749 |
| Fogrigarth | Shetland Islands | 60.28°N 01.54°W | HU2556 |
| Fogwatt | Moray | 57.59°N 03.29°W | NJ2357 |
| Foindle | Highland | 58.38°N 05.11°W | NC1848 |
| Folda | Angus | 56.76°N 03.34°W | NO1864 |
| Fold Head | Lancashire | 53.64°N 02.18°W | SD8817 |
| Fold Hill | Lincolnshire | 53.06°N 00.17°E | TF4654 |
| Foldrings | Sheffield | 53.43°N 01.56°W | SK2993 |
| Fole | Staffordshire | 52.93°N 01.94°W | SK0437 |
| Foleshill | Coventry | 52.43°N 01.48°W | SP3582 |
| Foley Park | Kent | 51.35°N 00.53°E | TQ7664 |
| Foley Park | Worcestershire | 52.37°N 02.26°W | SO8275 |
| Folke | Dorset | 50.91°N 02.49°W | ST6513 |
| Folkestone | Kent | 51.08°N 01.15°E | TR2136 |
| Folkingham | Lincolnshire | 52.88°N 00.41°W | TF0733 |
| Folkington | East Sussex | 50.80°N 00.19°E | TQ5503 |
| Folksworth | Cambridgeshire | 52.48°N 00.32°W | TL1489 |
| Folkton | North Yorkshire | 54.19°N 00.39°W | TA0579 |
| Folla Rule | Aberdeenshire | 57.38°N 02.45°W | NJ7333 |
| Folley | Shropshire | 52.57°N 02.34°W | SO7797 |
| Follifoot | North Yorkshire | 53.96°N 01.48°W | SE3452 |
| Follingsby | Gateshead | 54.93°N 01.53°W | NZ3060 |
| Folly | Dorset | 50.82°N 02.39°W | ST7203 |
| Folly | Pembrokeshire | 51.84°N 05.02°W | SM9220 |
| Folly Cross | Devon | 50.85°N 04.20°W | SS4508 |
| Folly Gate | Devon | 50.75°N 04.02°W | SX5797 |
| Folly Green | Essex | 51.90°N 00.61°E | TL8026 |
| Fonmon | The Vale Of Glamorgan | 51.39°N 03.38°W | ST0467 |
| Fonston | Cornwall | 50.69°N 04.53°W | SX2191 |
| Fonthill Bishop | Wiltshire | 51.08°N 02.10°W | ST9332 |
| Fonthill Gifford | Wiltshire | 51.07°N 02.11°W | ST9231 |
| Fontmell Magna | Dorset | 50.94°N 02.20°W | ST8616 |
| Fontmell Parva | Dorset | 50.92°N 02.25°W | ST8214 |
| Fontwell | West Sussex | 50.85°N 00.66°W | SU9407 |
| Font-y-gary | The Vale Of Glamorgan | 51.38°N 03.36°W | ST0566 |
| Foodieash | Fife | 56.33°N 03.02°W | NO3716 |
| Foolow | Derbyshire | 53.28°N 01.71°W | SK1976 |
| Footbridge | Gloucestershire | 51.95°N 01.95°W | SP0328 |
| Footherley | Staffordshire | 52.61°N 01.85°W | SK1002 |
| Footrid | Worcestershire | 52.32°N 02.47°W | SO6870 |
| Foots Cray | Bexley | 51.41°N 00.11°E | TQ4770 |

=== For ===
| Location | Locality | Coordinates (links to map & photo sources) | OS grid reference |
|---|---|---|---|
| Fora Ness | Shetland Islands | 59.94°N 01.36°W | HU358175 |
| Forbestown | Aberdeenshire | 57.19°N 03.06°W | NJ3612 |
| Force Forge | Cumbria | 54.30°N 03.03°W | SD3390 |
| Force Green | Kent | 51.27°N 00.06°E | TQ4455 |
| Force Mills | Cumbria | 54.31°N 03.01°W | SD3491 |
| Forcett | North Yorkshire | 54.50°N 01.73°W | NZ1712 |
| Ford | Argyll and Bute | 56.17°N 05.44°W | NM8603 |
| Ford | Buckinghamshire | 51.77°N 00.88°W | SP7709 |
| Ford | Derbyshire | 53.31°N 01.40°W | SK4080 |
| Ford (Alwington) | Devon | 50.99°N 04.28°W | SS4024 |
| Ford (Stockland) | Devon | 50.82°N 03.08°W | ST2403 |
| Ford (Chivelstone) | Devon | 50.24°N 03.71°W | SX7840 |
| Ford (Plymouth) | Devon | 50.38°N 04.16°W | SX4656 |
| Ford (Holbeton) | Devon | 50.33°N 03.95°W | SX6150 |
| Ford | Herefordshire | 52.19°N 02.71°W | SO5155 |
| Ford | Gloucestershire | 51.95°N 01.88°W | SP0829 |
| Ford | Kent | 51.34°N 01.15°E | TR2065 |
| Ford | Northumberland | 55.62°N 02.09°W | NT9437 |
| Ford | Pembrokeshire | 51.89°N 04.98°W | SM9526 |
| Ford (Wiveliscombe) | Somerset | 51.04°N 03.29°W | ST0928 |
| Ford (Chewton Mendip) | Somerset | 51.27°N 02.58°W | ST5953 |
| Ford | Sefton | 53.47°N 03.01°W | SJ3398 |
| Ford | Staffordshire | 53.07°N 01.91°W | SK0653 |
| Ford | Shropshire | 52.71°N 02.87°W | SJ4113 |
| Ford | West Sussex | 50.81°N 00.59°W | SU9903 |
| Ford (North Wiltshire) | Wiltshire | 51.46°N 02.23°W | ST8474 |
| Ford (near Salisbury) | Wiltshire | 51.08°N 01.77°W | SU1632 |
| Forda (Georgeham) | Devon | 51.12°N 04.21°W | SS4539 |
| Forda (Sourton) | Devon | 50.69°N 04.08°W | SX5390 |
| Fordbridge | Solihull | 52.48°N 01.75°W | SP1787 |
| Fordcombe | Kent | 51.13°N 00.17°E | TQ5240 |
| Fordel | Perth and Kinross | 56.29°N 03.40°W | NO1312 |
| Fordell | Fife | 56.07°N 03.36°W | NT1588 |
| Forden | Powys | 52.59°N 03.15°W | SJ2200 |
| Ford End (Chelmsford) | Essex | 51.81°N 00.42°E | TL6716 |
| Ford End (Uttlesford) | Essex | 51.968°N 0.111°E | TL451321 |
| Forder | Cornwall | 50.40°N 04.23°W | SX4158 |
| Forder Green | Devon | 50.49°N 03.72°W | SX7867 |
| Ford Forge | Northumberland | 55.63°N 02.11°W | NT9338 |
| Fordgate | Somerset | 51.08°N 02.97°W | ST3232 |
| Ford Green | Lancashire | 53.90°N 02.80°W | SD4746 |
| Ford Green | City of Stoke-on-Trent | 53.04°N 02.18°W | SJ8850 |
| Fordham | Cambridgeshire | 52.30°N 00.37°E | TL6270 |
| Fordham | Norfolk | 52.56°N 00.37°E | TL6199 |
| Fordham | Essex | 51.91°N 00.79°E | TL9228 |
| Fordham Heath | Essex | 51.89°N 00.80°E | TL9326 |
| Ford Heath | Shropshire | 52.69°N 02.88°W | SJ4011 |
| Ford Hill | Northumberland | 55.62°N 02.08°W | NT9537 |
| Fordhouses | Wolverhampton | 52.62°N 02.13°W | SJ9103 |
| Fordie | Perth and Kinross | 56.37°N 03.96°W | NN7922 |
| Fordingbridge | Hampshire | 50.92°N 01.80°W | SU1414 |
| Fordington | Lincolnshire | 53.21°N 00.11°E | TF4171 |
| Fordley | North Tyneside | 55.05°N 01.59°W | NZ2673 |
| Fordon | East Riding of Yorkshire | 54.16°N 00.40°W | TA0475 |
| Fordoun | Aberdeenshire | 56.86°N 02.42°W | NO7475 |
| Ford's Green | East Sussex | 51.02°N 00.05°E | TQ4427 |
| Ford's Green | Suffolk | 52.25°N 01.01°E | TM0666 |
| Ford Street | Somerset | 50.95°N 03.21°W | ST1518 |
| Fordstreet | Essex | 51.90°N 00.77°E | TL9126 |
| Fordton | Devon | 50.77°N 03.64°W | SX8499 |
| Fordwater | Devon | 50.81°N 02.98°W | ST3102 |
| Fordwells | Oxfordshire | 51.81°N 01.56°W | SP3013 |
| Fordwich | Kent | 51.28°N 01.12°E | TR1859 |
| Fordyce | Aberdeenshire | 57.65°N 02.75°W | NJ5563 |
| Forebridge | Staffordshire | 52.79°N 02.12°W | SJ9222 |
| Foredale | North Yorkshire | 54.11°N 02.30°W | SD8069 |
| Foregin | Highland | 57.30°N 03.87°W | NH8725 |
| Forehill | South Ayrshire | 55.44°N 04.62°W | NS3420 |
| Foreland | Isle of Wight | 50.68°N 01.06°W | SZ660877 |
| Foreland Fields | Isle of Wight | 50.67°N 01.08°W | SZ6587 |
| Foreland Point | Devon | 51.24°N 03.78°W | SS755506 |
| Foremark | Derbyshire | 52.83°N 01.51°W | SK3326 |
| Forest | North Yorkshire | 54.40°N 01.57°W | NZ2700 |
| Forest Becks | Lancashire | 53.95°N 02.33°W | SD7851 |
| Forest Coal Pit | Monmouthshire | 51.87°N 03.04°W | SO2820 |
| Forestdale | Croydon | 51.34°N 00.04°W | TQ3662 |
| Forest Gate | Hampshire | 50.90°N 01.09°W | SU6412 |
| Forest Gate | Newham | 51.54°N 00.01°E | TQ4085 |
| Forest Green | Surrey | 51.15°N 00.39°W | TQ1241 |
| Forest Green | Gloucestershire | 51.69°N 02.23°W | SO8400 |
| Forest Hall | North Tyneside | 55.01°N 01.57°W | NZ2769 |
| Forest Head | Cumbria | 54.90°N 02.65°W | NY5857 |
| Forest Hill | Oxfordshire | 51.75°N 01.16°W | SP5807 |
| Forest Hill | Wiltshire | 51.41°N 01.71°W | SU2068 |
| Forest Hill | Lewisham | 51.44°N 00.05°W | TQ3573 |
| Forest Holme | Lancashire | 53.72°N 02.24°W | SD8425 |
| Forest-in-Teesdale | Durham | 54.65°N 02.21°W | NY8629 |
| Forest Lane Head | North Yorkshire | 53.99°N 01.49°W | SE3356 |
| Forest Mill | Clackmannan | 56.11°N 03.69°W | NS9593 |
| Forest Moor | North Yorkshire | 53.99°N 01.48°W | SE3455 |
| Forestreet | Devon | 50.87°N 04.29°W | SS3911 |
| Forest Row | East Sussex | 51.08°N 00.02°E | TQ4234 |
| Forest Side | Isle of Wight | 50.69°N 01.33°W | SZ4789 |
| Forestside | West Sussex | 50.90°N 00.93°W | SU7512 |
| Forest Town | Nottinghamshire | 53.15°N 01.16°W | SK5662 |
| Forewoods Common | Wiltshire | 51.34°N 02.23°W | ST8461 |
| Forfar | Angus | 56.63°N 02.89°W | NO4550 |
| Forgandenny | Perth and Kinross | 56.34°N 03.49°W | NO0818 |
| Forge | Cornwall | 50.25°N 05.24°W | SW6945 |
| Forge | Powys | 52.57°N 03.83°W | SN7699 |
| Forge Hammer | Torfaen | 51.64°N 03.02°W | ST2995 |
| Forge Side | Torfaen | 51.76°N 03.10°W | SO2408 |
| Forgewood | North Lanarkshire | 55.79°N 04.01°W | NS7458 |
| Forgue | Aberdeenshire | 57.49°N 02.65°W | NJ6145 |
| Forhill | Worcestershire | 52.37°N 01.92°W | SP0575 |
| Formby | Sefton | 53.55°N 03.07°W | SD2907 |
| Forncett End | Norfolk | 52.49°N 01.15°E | TM1493 |
| Fornham All Saints | Suffolk | 52.27°N 00.68°E | TL8367 |
| Fornham St Genevieve | Suffolk | 52.27°N 00.69°E | TL8467 |
| Fornham St Martin | Suffolk | 52.27°N 00.71°E | TL8567 |
| Forrabury | Cornwall | 50.67°N 04.70°W | SX0990 |
| Forres | Moray | 57.60°N 03.62°W | NJ0358 |
| Forrestfield | North Lanarkshire | 55.88°N 03.84°W | NS8567 |
| Forrey Green | Essex | 51.95°N 00.56°E | TL7632 |
| Forsbrook | Staffordshire | 52.96°N 02.06°W | SJ9641 |
| Forshaw Heath | Warwickshire | 52.35°N 01.88°W | SP0873 |
| Forsinard | Highland | 58.36°N 03.89°W | NC8943 |
| Forstal | Kent | 51.29°N 00.48°E | TQ7358 |
| Forston | Dorset | 50.75°N 02.48°W | SY6695 |
| Fort Augustus | Highland | 57.14°N 04.69°W | NH3709 |
| Forteviot | Perth and Kinross | 56.33°N 03.53°W | NO0517 |
| Fort George | Highland | 57.57°N 04.07°W | NH7656 |
| Forth | South Lanarkshire | 55.75°N 03.69°W | NS9453 |
| Forthampton | Gloucestershire | 51.98°N 02.21°W | SO8532 |
| Forthay | Gloucestershire | 51.66°N 02.37°W | ST7496 |
| Fortingall | Perth and Kinross | 56.59°N 04.07°W | NN7347 |
| Fortis Green | Barnet | 51.58°N 00.16°W | TQ2789 |
| Fort Matilda | Inverclyde | 55.95°N 04.80°W | NS2577 |
| Forton (Test Valley) | Hampshire | 51.18°N 01.41°W | SU4143 |
| Forton (Gosport) | Hampshire | 50.79°N 01.14°W | SU6000 |
| Forton | Somerset | 50.85°N 02.95°W | ST3307 |
| Forton | Lancashire | 53.95°N 02.79°W | SD4851 |
| Forton | Staffordshire | 52.78°N 02.37°W | SJ7521 |
| Forton | Shropshire | 52.73°N 02.86°W | SJ4216 |
| Forton Heath | Shropshire | 52.74°N 02.84°W | SJ4317 |
| Fortrie | Aberdeenshire | 57.49°N 02.56°W | NJ6645 |
| Fortrose | Highland | 57.57°N 04.14°W | NH7256 |
| Fortuneswell | Dorset | 50.55°N 02.45°W | SY6873 |
| Fort William | Highland | 56.81°N 05.11°W | NN1073 |
| Forty Green (Penn) | Buckinghamshire | 51.61°N 00.67°W | SU9291 |
| Forty Green (Bledlow) | Buckinghamshire | 51.72°N 00.90°W | SP7603 |
| Forty Hill | Enfield | 51.65°N 00.07°W | TQ3397 |
| Forward Green | Suffolk | 52.18°N 01.05°E | TM0959 |
| Forwood | Gloucestershire | 51.69°N 02.20°W | SO8600 |

=== Fos-Foy ===
| Location | Locality | Coordinates (links to map & photo sources) | OS grid reference |
|---|---|---|---|
| Fosbury | Wiltshire | 51.32°N 01.55°W | SU3158 |
| Foscot | Oxfordshire | 51.88°N 01.65°W | SP2421 |
| Foscote / Foscott | Buckinghamshire | 52.00°N 00.96°W | SP7135 |
| Foscote | Northamptonshire | 52.11°N 01.03°W | SP6647 |
| Foscote | Wiltshire | 51.50°N 02.20°W | ST8679 |
| Fosdyke | Lincolnshire | 52.87°N 00.05°W | TF3133 |
| Fosdyke Bridge | Lincolnshire | 52.86°N 00.05°W | TF3132 |
| Fossebridge | Gloucestershire | 51.79°N 01.88°W | SP0811 |
| Fostall | Kent | 51.31°N 00.95°E | TR0661 |
| Fosten Green | Kent | 51.09°N 00.61°E | TQ8336 |
| Fosterhouses | Doncaster | 53.61°N 01.01°W | SE6514 |
| Foster's Booth | Northamptonshire | 52.18°N 01.03°W | SP6654 |
| Foster's Green | Worcestershire | 52.28°N 02.04°W | SO9765 |
| Foster Street | Essex | 51.75°N 00.14°E | TL4808 |
| Foston | Derbyshire | 52.87°N 01.73°W | SK1831 |
| Foston | Leicestershire | 52.54°N 01.11°W | SP6095 |
| Foston | Lincolnshire | 52.96°N 00.73°W | SK8542 |
| Foston | North Yorkshire | 54.07°N 00.94°W | SE6965 |
| Foston on the Wolds | East Riding of Yorkshire | 53.97°N 00.32°W | TA1055 |
| Fotherby | Lincolnshire | 53.39°N 00.03°W | TF3191 |
| Fothergill | Cumbria | 54.69°N 03.52°W | NY0234 |
| Fotheringhay | Northamptonshire | 52.52°N 00.45°W | TL0593 |
| Foula | Shetland Islands | 60.12°N 02.07°W | HT958379 |
| Foul Anchor | Cambridgeshire | 52.73°N 00.16°E | TF4617 |
| Foulbridge | Cumbria | 54.82°N 02.91°W | NY4148 |
| Foulby | Wakefield | 53.64°N 01.41°W | SE3917 |
| Foulden | Norfolk | 52.56°N 00.59°E | TL7699 |
| Foulden | Scottish Borders | 55.78°N 02.12°W | NT9255 |
| Foul End | Warwickshire | 52.54°N 01.64°W | SP2494 |
| Foulford | Hampshire | 50.84°N 01.74°W | SU1805 |
| Foul Mile | East Sussex | 50.91°N 00.30°E | TQ6215 |
| Foulness Island | Essex | 51.60°N 00.90°E | TR011930 |
| Foulness Point | Essex | 51.61°N 00.94°E | TR038951 |
| Foulride Green | East Sussex | 50.80°N 00.24°E | TQ5803 |
| Foulridge | Lancashire | 53.87°N 02.18°W | SD8842 |
| Foulsham | Norfolk | 52.77°N 01.00°E | TG0324 |
| Foundry | Cornwall | 50.18°N 05.43°W | SW5537 |
| Foundry Hill | Norfolk | 52.80°N 01.09°E | TG0928 |
| Fountain | Bridgend | 51.53°N 03.61°W | SS8883 |
| Fountainhall | Scottish Borders | 55.73°N 02.92°W | NT4249 |
| Four Ashes | Buckinghamshire | 51.64°N 00.74°W | SU8795 |
| Four Ashes | Solihull | 52.37°N 01.78°W | SP1575 |
| Four Ashes (Enville) | Staffordshire | 52.48°N 02.29°W | SO8087 |
| Four Ashes (Brewood and Coven) | Staffordshire | 52.66°N 02.13°W | SJ9108 |
| Four Ashes | Suffolk | 52.29°N 00.93°E | TM0070 |
| Four Crosses | Powys | 52.75°N 03.08°W | SJ2718 |
| Four Crosses | Staffordshire | 52.67°N 02.07°W | SJ9509 |
| Four Crosses | Wrexham | 53.06°N 03.12°W | SJ2553 |
| Four Elms | Kent | 51.21°N 00.08°E | TQ4648 |
| Four Elms | Devon | 50.85°N 03.06°W | ST2507 |
| Four Foot | Somerset | 51.09°N 02.60°W | ST5833 |
| Four Forks | Somerset | 51.12°N 03.10°W | ST2337 |
| Four Gates | Bolton | 53.55°N 02.54°W | SD6407 |
| Four Gotes | Cambridgeshire | 52.72°N 00.13°E | TF4416 |
| Four Houses Corner | Hampshire | 51.38°N 01.08°W | SU6465 |
| Four Lane End | Barnsley | 53.51°N 01.59°W | SE2702 |
| Four Lane Ends (Blackburn) | Lancashire | 53.75°N 02.50°W | SD6729 |
| Four Lane Ends | Bradford | 53.79°N 01.80°W | SE1333 |
| Four Lane Ends | Bury | 53.60°N 02.36°W | SD7612 |
| Four Lanes | Cornwall | 50.19°N 05.25°W | SW6838 |
| Fourlanes End | Cheshire | 53.12°N 02.30°W | SJ8059 |
| Four Marks | Hampshire | 51.11°N 01.04°W | SU6735 |
| Four Mile Bridge | Isle of Anglesey | 53.27°N 04.58°W | SH2878 |
| Four Mile Elm | Gloucestershire | 51.80°N 02.29°W | SO8012 |
| Four Oaks | East Sussex | 50.98°N 00.64°E | TQ8624 |
| Four Oaks | Solihull | 52.41°N 01.64°W | SP2480 |
| Four Oaks | Birmingham | 52.58°N 01.85°W | SP1099 |
| Four Oaks | Gloucestershire | 51.94°N 02.45°W | SO6928 |
| Four Oaks | Kent | 51.32°N 00.84°E | TQ9862 |
| Four Oaks Park | Birmingham | 52.58°N 01.83°W | SP1198 |
| Four Points | Berkshire | 51.49°N 01.20°W | SU5578 |
| Four Pools | Worcestershire | 52.07°N 01.94°W | SP0442 |
| Four Roads | Carmarthenshire | 51.75°N 04.26°W | SN4409 |
| Four Roads | Isle of Man | 54.07°N 04.75°W | SC2068 |
| Fourstones | Northumberland | 54.99°N 02.17°W | NY8967 |
| Four Throws | Kent | 51.03°N 00.52°E | TQ7729 |
| Four Wantz | Essex | 51.77°N 00.33°E | TL6111 |
| Four Wents (Cranbrook & Sissinghurst) | Kent | 51.10°N 00.49°E | TQ7537 |
| Four Wents (Hawkhurst) | Kent | 51.06°N 00.51°E | TQ7632 |
| Fovant | Wiltshire | 51.06°N 02.00°W | SU0029 |
| Fowey | Cornwall | 50.32°N 04.64°W | SX1251 |
| Fowler's Plot | Somerset | 51.11°N 02.95°W | ST3336 |
| Fowley Common | Cheshire | 53.45°N 02.49°W | SJ6795 |
| Fowley Island | Kent | 51.35°N 00.82°E | TQ968658 |
| Fowlis | Angus | 56.48°N 03.10°W | NO3233 |
| Fowlis Wester | Perth and Kinross | 56.39°N 03.75°W | NN9224 |
| Fowlmere | Cambridgeshire | 52.08°N 00.07°E | TL4245 |
| Fownhope | Herefordshire | 52.00°N 02.61°W | SO5834 |
| Foxash Estate | Essex | 51.93°N 01.00°E | TM0730 |
| Foxbar | Renfrewshire | 55.81°N 04.47°W | NS4561 |
| Foxbury | Bromley | 51.41°N 00.06°E | TQ4471 |
| Foxcombe Hill | Oxfordshire | 51.70°N 01.29°W | SP4901 |
| Fox Corner | Bedfordshire | 51.95°N 00.66°W | SP9229 |
| Fox Corner | Surrey | 51.27°N 00.62°W | SU9654 |
| Foxcote | Gloucestershire | 51.86°N 01.98°W | SP0118 |
| Foxcote | Somerset | 51.29°N 02.41°W | ST7155 |
| Foxdale | Isle of Man | 54.16°N 04.65°W | SC2778 |
| Foxdown | Hampshire | 51.24°N 01.27°W | SU5150 |
| Foxearth | Essex | 52.06°N 00.66°E | TL8344 |
| Foxendown | Kent | 51.36°N 00.36°E | TQ6565 |
| Foxfield | Cumbria | 54.25°N 03.22°W | SD2085 |
| Foxford | Coventry | 52.44°N 01.48°W | SP3583 |
| Foxham | Wiltshire | 51.49°N 02.04°W | ST9777 |
| Fox Hatch | Essex | 51.65°N 00.26°E | TQ5798 |
| Fox Hill | Herefordshire | 52.10°N 02.46°W | SO6845 |
| Fox Hill | Bath and North East Somerset | 51.35°N 02.36°W | ST7562 |
| Foxhills | Hampshire | 50.89°N 01.51°W | SU3411 |
| Foxhole | Cornwall | 50.35°N 04.86°W | SW9654 |
| Foxhole | Norfolk | 52.52°N 01.25°E | TM2197 |
| Fox Hole | Swansea | 51.56°N 04.09°W | SS5587 |
| Fox Holes | Wiltshire | 51.16°N 02.20°W | ST8641 |
| Foxholes | North Yorkshire | 54.14°N 00.45°W | TA0173 |
| Foxhunt Green | East Sussex | 50.94°N 00.19°E | TQ5418 |
| Fox Lane | Hampshire | 51.30°N 00.78°W | SU8557 |
| Foxley | Herefordshire | 52.10°N 02.86°W | SO4146 |
| Foxley | Norfolk | 52.74°N 01.00°E | TG0321 |
| Foxley | Staffordshire | 53.07°N 02.31°W | SJ7953 |
| Foxley | Wiltshire | 51.56°N 02.16°W | ST8985 |
| Foxlydiate | Worcestershire | 52.30°N 01.98°W | SP0167 |
| Fox Royd | Kirklees | 53.65°N 01.65°W | SE2318 |
| Fox Street | Essex | 51.90°N 00.93°E | TM0227 |
| Foxt | Staffordshire | 53.02°N 01.95°W | SK0348 |
| Foxton | Cambridgeshire | 52.11°N 00.05°E | TL4148 |
| Foxton | Leicestershire | 52.49°N 00.97°W | SP7089 |
| Foxton | North Yorkshire | 54.35°N 01.35°W | SE4296 |
| Foxton | Stockton-on-Tees | 54.61°N 01.44°W | NZ3624 |
| Foxup | North Yorkshire | 54.18°N 02.21°W | SD8676 |
| Foxwist Green | Cheshire | 53.20°N 02.57°W | SJ6268 |
| Foxwood | Shropshire | 52.38°N 02.55°W | SO6276 |
| Foy | Herefordshire | 51.94°N 02.59°W | SO5928 |
| Foyers | Highland | 57.24°N 04.50°W | NH4920 |
