= Forde =

Forde may refer to:

- Forde (surname)
- Førde (disambiguation)
- Forde Abbey, Dorset, England
- Forde Inquiry, 1999 report on child abuse presented to the government of Queensland, Australia
- Forde, Australian Capital Territory, suburb in Canberra, Australia
- Division of Forde, Electoral Division in Queensland, Australia
- Forde Ministry, thirty-second Australian Commonwealth ministry, 6–13 July 1945
- Seaforde, a village in County Down, Northern Ireland (named for a family called Forde)

== See also ==
- Ford (disambiguation)
- Fforde
