= Coin cleaning =

Removing undesirable substances from a coin

An improperly cleaned Indian Head cent from 1900. Note the wear present, as well as tarnished areas on the "brilliant red" surface.

Coin cleaning is the controversial process of removing undesirable substances from a coin's surface in order to make it more attractive to potential buyers. Coin cleaning is not advised as it generally decreases its value by removing the coin's patina, the surface valued by collectors. Whether cleaning coins is necessary is a subject disputed among the numismatic community. Those that argue in favor of cleaning are also in dispute with each other on which methods work best. It was once common practice to clean coins as the method was recommended by experts in the field. Cleaning agents ranged from pencil erasers to wire brushes and potassium cyanide with the goal to make the coin look brilliant again. When certified grading came into use in the mid-1980s though, the practice of cleaning coins diminished over time. Most coin experts have since come out against cleaning coins, as doing so can negatively affect them both in grade and value. Cleaning remains common for certain specialty coins that are frequently found with substantial corrosion, such as shipwreck finds and ancient coins. If a potentially valuable coin must be cleaned (for example if the coin is deformed) then professional work is recommended. Commonly found coins are mentioned as ideal candidates for any attempted cleaning experiments.

== History ==
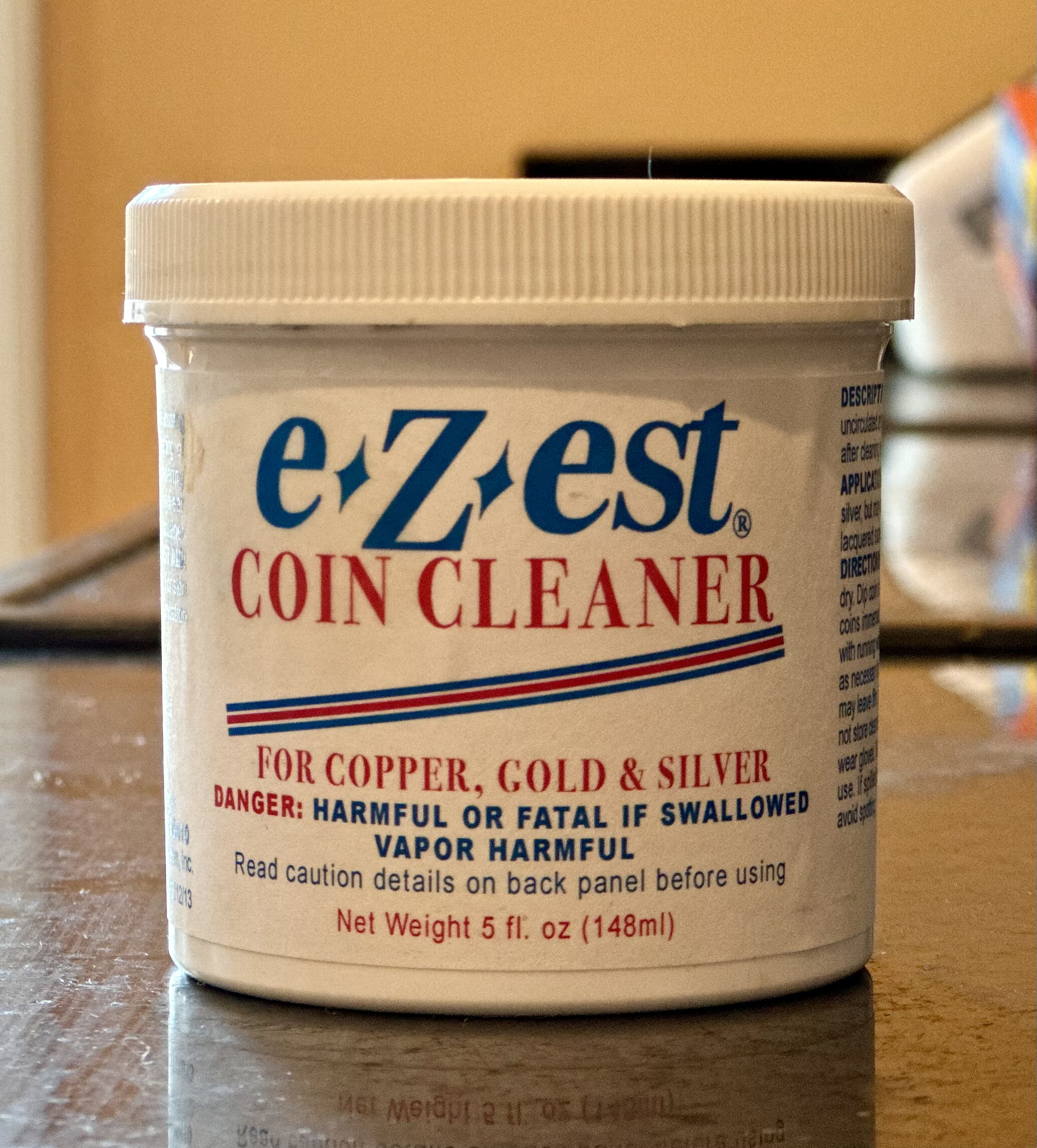
Container of coin cleaner which is used for dipping coins

Coin cleaning in general has no definitive start date, as when any object looks dirty people are usually inclined to clean it. The practice of coin cleaning during the modern era dates to at least the mid-1800s in the United States. In 1857, half cents and large cents became popular with collectors after they were discontinued due to the rising costs of copper. During this time cleansers were used on these coins to try and make them appear mint red again. Another early recorded example involves the Philadelphia coin cabinet. In 1903, many coins in the collection that had once been in proof condition were now partly covered in a white unattractive coating. An investigation found that the coins in the cabinet (displayed in the Philadelphia Mint since 1838) had at some point been cleaned by an attendant using purchased metal polish, as the coins were "tarnished". The cabinet today resides in the Smithsonian.

By the 1930s the motto "brilliant is best" was adopted by those in the coin collecting community. Coins that were toned were considered tarnished which caused collectors to brighten up their coins with things like abrasives. Penny boards were even made with instructions on how collectors should properly clean their coins by using a pencil eraser with a little bit of vinegar. The widespread practice of "improving" coins continued into the 1960s with advertisements on lotions and potions with the aim of making coins brilliant again.

According to Q. David Bowers, collectors and coin dealers cleaned and dipped their coins then re-dipped them when the toning re-appeared as a result of these messages. Bowers estimated in 1960 that 90 to 95% of the Lincoln cents sold in the marketplace dated 1910 through the late 1920s were brilliant as a result of dipping. Coins that were cleaned also include the Indian Head cent, starting in the 1960s many now scarce dates were "whizzed" with a rotary wire brush which later destroyed them of value.

The widespread practice of coin cleaning lasted until the invention of third-party grading and sealed coin slabs in the early 1980s. When submitted examples were finally viewed under the microscope and trained naked eye, the effects of treating coins were revealed to be less than ideal. Poorly cleaned coins are now labeled "Improperly Cleaned", which negatively affects their market value depending on severity.

== Professional stance ==
Numerous known numismatists have given their opinions over the decades regarding coin cleaning. William H. Sheldon (creator of the Sheldon coin grading scale) wrote an opinion on cleaning old pennies stating: "Many a cent has been ruined in an attempt to improve it. Amateurs, and some who are not so amateur, are forever trying to improve the condition or appearance of an old cent." Richard Snow, who specializes in the field of Flying Eagle and Indian Head cents, wrote that some cleaning techniques could improve the surface of a coin.

Snow does not suggest that people try these remedies but gives an "indication" of what could be done. He goes on to recommend in all instances that experiments be done on cheap bronze Lincoln cents (minted 1962 to 1982) and not valuable older coins. Scott A. Travers, author of the book The Insider's Guide to Coins Values states that a coin should never be cleaned as "many" collectors find them to be "repugnant". Travers also wrote that the idea of enhancing a coin's value through cleaning is a misconception. Kenneth Bressett and A. Kosoff also wrote opinions on the matter saying that once a coin has been "stripped" of its original surface and luster, it can "never be fully restored or made Uncirculated again". John J. Ford Jr. wrote an opinion regarding expertly cleaned coins saying that "while the result makes the coin look untouched, attractively colored coins should be left alone".

== Methods ==
Listed below are some examples of how coins are (or were) cleaned. Coins with untouched original surfaces are generally more desirable than those that have been cleaned, although lightly cleaned coins with no damage done may still receive a normal coin grade. Improper cleaning can result in a coin's surface being damaged beyond repair, which is why expert attention is needed for potentially valuable coins. If a coin is shown to be damaged by cleaning then it will be marked as "Improperly Cleaned" or have a problem description by grading services.

Method	Description
Abrasives	Baking soda, scouring powder, and pencil erasers all cause damage to coins. Brushing a coin with a toothbrush or a brush with soft fibers can create minute scratches on the surface of a coin. These scratches, known as "hairlines" may impact the grade of the coin depending on the severity.
Burnished/ Polishing	Aggressive cleaning which gives the coin a "very brilliant but unnatural sheen". These coins are graded with a description which lowers the coin's value by 90%.
Dipping	The coin is dipped into a dilute acid solution that removes the oxidation from the coin along with a small amount of metal. Overdipped coins result in loss of luster which lowers the coin's grade and appeal.
Ivory soap and water	According to author Thomas E. Hudgeons Jr., this is the safest way commonly found coins are cleaned. Distilled water is recommended as tap water contains chlorine.
Olive oil	The coin is dipped into olive oil which according to Hudgeons, works best for common copper or bronze coins.
Potassium cyanide	This solution was commonly used as a coin cleanser in the 1920s. It led to the accidental death of a prominent numismatist at the time.
Ultrasonic cleaners	These coins are cleaned by using distilled water with a small amount of detergent in a special vibrating container. Acid based cleaners will eat away at a coin's surface diminishing its value.
Vinegar and salt	According to research professor Vinod Patel, washing common coins with natural white vinegar and iodized salt in distilled water is a non destructive way of cleaning them.
Whizzing	These coins are "cleaned" by means of a fast rotary wire brush which damages the surface.

== Shipwreck finds ==
Coins involved in shipwreck finds are usually documented and photographed in their before and after state to study any changes made by the restoration process. While the cleaning process involves desalination in order to remove harmful salts that include chlorides, any potential damage depends on the type of metal the coin was originally minted in. Sea water is very corrosive and destructive to silver or copper coins, their value is determined by their original condition as raised and by the conservation process. Gold coins on the other hand survive better underwater making their conservation process easier. In the case of the Sveti Pavao shipwreck, the items involved were isolated in a polypropylene net and placed in tap water. The tap water was then exchanged and monitored until it was finally replaced by distilled water towards the end of the process. The items involved are then dried, and cleaned differently depending on the base metal of the object.

Third party coin grading services such as Numismatic Guaranty Company will apply a special label called "shipwreck effect" (rather than a "cleaned" remark) for those that show signs of corrosion or other damage. These labels are only given to coins that are "obtained through the least invasive means possible and recovered in an archaeologically sound manner in which the history of the wreck is preserved." In terms of value, coins recovered from shipwrecks likely hold an appeal as historical artifacts that can be given the marketable status of "treasure". These coins only have an added value if they are determined to be genuine, as a majority of collectors do not want to own an illegal coin subject to seizure. The largest supply of American mint state gold coins have been recovered from shipwrecks in grades previously unknown to collectors.

== See also ==
- Coin grading
- Sheldon coin grading scale
- Coin storage
