= Jack Ford =

Jack Ford may refer to:

== Characters ==
- Jack Ford, a character in When the Boat Comes In, portrayed by James Bolam
- Jack Ford, a character in the video game Madden NFL 18 and Madden NFL 20

== People ==
- Jack Ford (American politician) (1947–2015), mayor of Toledo, Ohio
- Jack Ford (Falkland Islands politician), member of the Falkland Islands Legislative Assembly
- John Gardner Ford (born 1951), American business executive, nicknamed "Jack"; son of American president Gerald R. Ford
- Jack Ford (journalist), American television personality
- Jack Ford (rugby union) (1906–1985), rugby union player who represented Australia
- John Ford (1894–1973), American film director sometimes called "Jack Ford"

== See also ==
- John Ford (disambiguation)
- Ford (surname)
