= Offerton Green =

Coordinates: 53.395°N 2.103°W

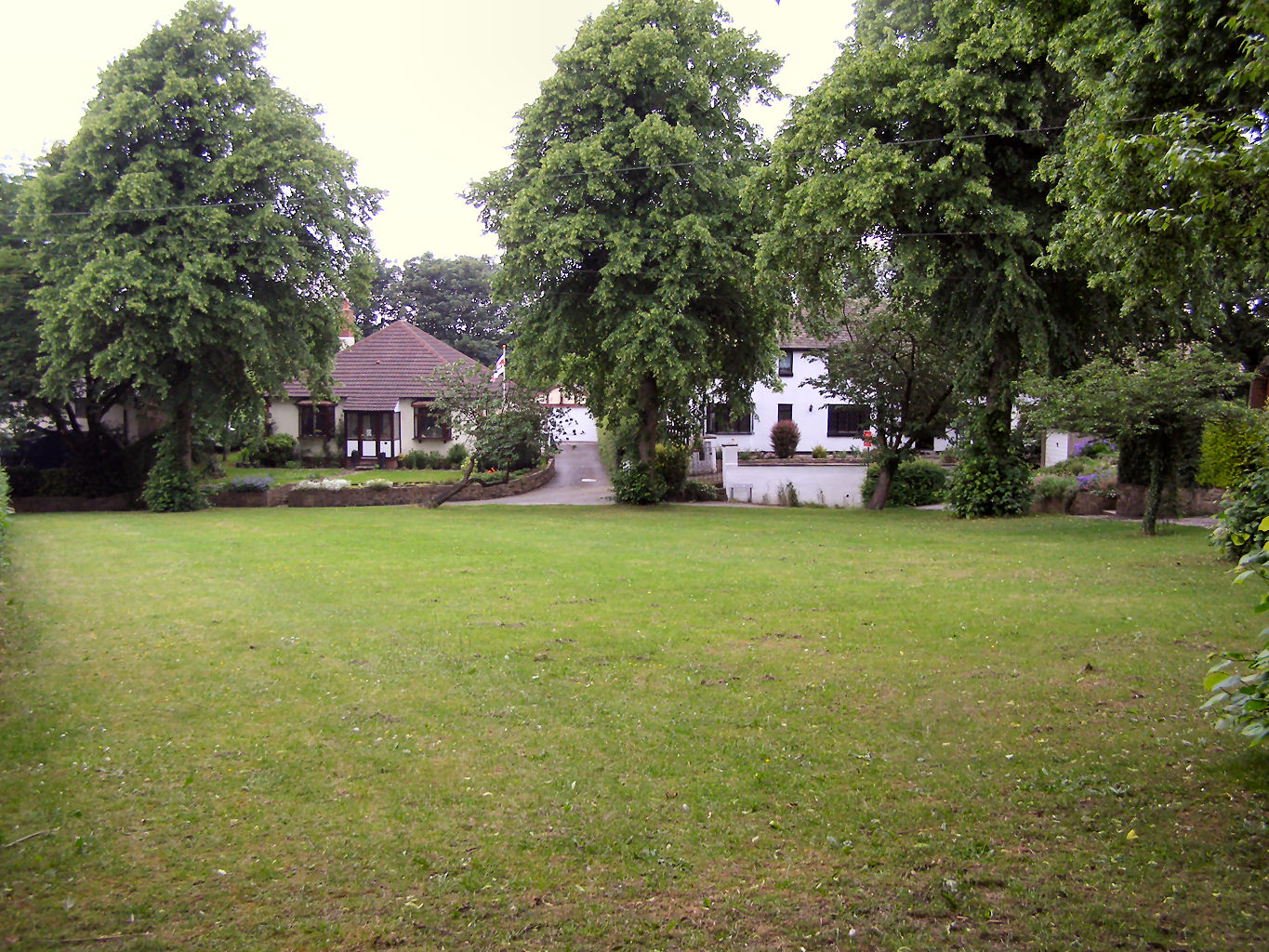
- Offerton Green in 2010

- Location within Greater Manchester
- OS grid reference: SJ931887
- Metropolitan borough: Stockport
- Metropolitan county: Greater Manchester
- Region: North West
- Country: England
- Sovereign state: United Kingdom
- Post town: STOCKPORT
- Postcode district: SK2
- Dialling code: 0161
- Police: Greater Manchester
- Fire: Greater Manchester
- Ambulance: North West
- UK Parliament: Hazel Grove

Offerton Green is a village in Stockport, England. The village is little more than a green surrounded by houses, closely neighbouring nearby areas of Bosden Farm and Foggbrook.
