= 2 yen coin =

Former denomination of Japanese yen

Two Yen
- Japan
- Value: 2 Japanese Yen
- Edge: Smooth
- Shape: Circular
- Composition: 90% Gold; 10% Copper
- Years of minting: 1870–1892

Obverse
- Design: Dragon figure surrounded by legend. (Note: In numismatic terminology, a "legend" is a formal inscription found around the margin of a coin.)

Reverse
- Design: Emblem of the Imperial family.

The 2 yen coin (二圓金貨) was a short lived denomination of Japanese yen. During the first year of mintage in 1870, hundreds of thousands of these new coins were struck. These figures dropped off sharply as the Japanese government looked towards silver as a trading commodity. The supply of gold bullion had also dwindled causing the demand for these coins to outpace the supply available. The public hoarded two yen coins along with other denominations of gold causing them not to circulate during the mid 1870s. Japan eventually obtained a supply of gold bullion towards the end of the century, but this came too late for the two yen coin which was last minted in 1892. Almost one hundred years later the two yen coin was officially demonetized. While not in circulation any more, these coins are bought and sold by numismatics for academic study, and by those with a hobby.

== History ==
The Japanese mint was first opened in December, 1870 at Osaka. Each two yen coin was set at 900 fineness with a weight of 51.44 grains. Gold bullion was delivered from private Japanese citizens, foreigners, and the Japanese government. The overall production of gold coin declined by the mid 1870s as the Japanese government established a gold and silver double digit system. Meji's decree proclamation No. 27 set the gold and silver price ratio to 1: 16.17. With the opening of silver to trade came the trade dollar, Japan issued its own version in 1875 in order compete with other currencies such as the United States. The low mintages of the two yen coin in the latter years may also be attributed to a lack of gold bullion available, as previously minted gold coins were hoarded by the public and did not circulate. It was reported that by 1896 a total of 151,210,000 silver pieces of all denominations of yen had been struck since 1870, verses 2,037,055 for gold.

Japan officially went onto the gold standard in 1897 from reserves obtained after the first Sino-Japanese War. New laws were passed that abolished the Japanese silver trade dollar, as well as the one silver yen piece. The two yen gold coin was also not among the new coins scheduled to be minted. Two yen gold coins were finally abolished as legal tender in 1988, by this time the exchange rate for gold coins to Japan's modern circulating currency as a whole was zero.

== Circulation figures ==
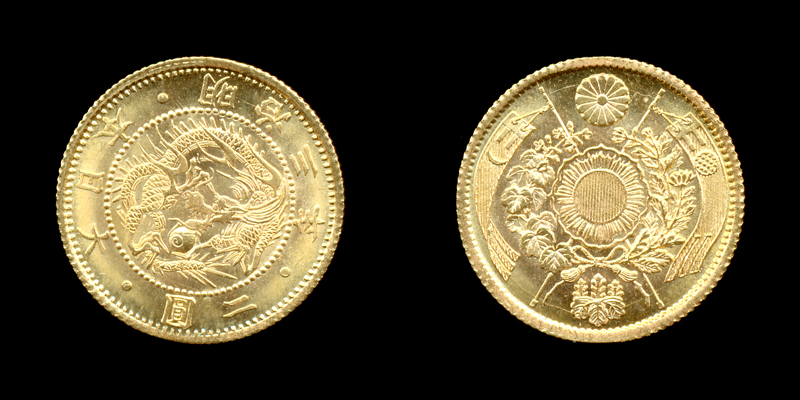
2 yen coin from 1870 (year 3)

Meiji

The following are circulation figures for the two yen coin, all of which were minted between the 3rd and 25th years of Meiji's reign. The dates all begin with the Japanese symbol 明治 (Meiji), followed by the year of his reign the coin was minted. Each coin is read clockwise from right to left, so in the example used below "九" would read as "year 9" or 1876. It is unknown if genuine coins dated 1874 even exist as they remain "unverified". Two yen coins were struck in 1892, but none were released for circulation.

- "Year" ← "Number representing year of reign" ← "Emperors name" (Ex: 年 ← 九 ← 治明)

Year of reign	Japanese date	Gregorian date	Mintage
3rd	三	1870	883,293
7th	七	1874	Unverified
9th	九	1876	178
10th	十	1877	39
13th	三十	1880	87
25th	五十二	1892	Not circulated (Note: Several unique coins dated 1892 are known to have been produced to display at the World's Columbian Exposition. While there are no known existing examples of two yen coins dated 1892 (year 25), they are mentioned by Krause Publications.)

== Collecting ==
The value of any given coin is determined by survivability rate and condition as collectors in general prefer uncleaned appealing coins. For this particular series, the only collectable coins are first year issues dated 1870 (year 3), as the rest were minted in very low amounts and are very rare. The date 1880 (year 13) has only ten known surviving examples out of a total mintage of less than 100. At least two of these coins have sold at auction; one in 2008 for $299,595 (USD), and another in 2011 for $75,000 (USD). Other dates such as 1876 (year 9) have also appeared, listing at $144,000 (USD) in a 2016 Japanese auction.

== See also ==
- Gold coin
- Gold as an investment
- Quarter eagle
