= Toning (coin) =

Color change caused by oxidization

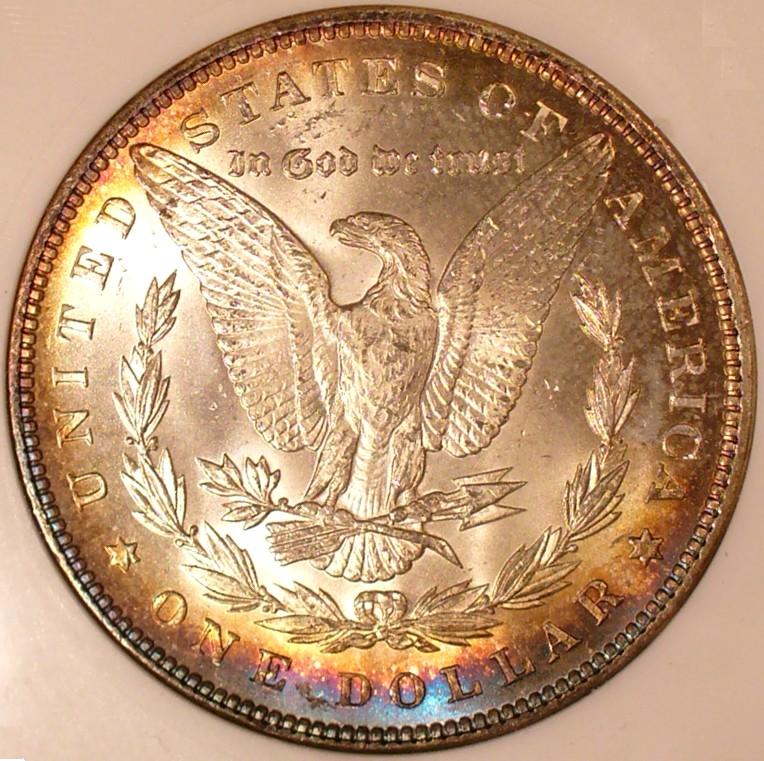
A Morgan dollar with iridescent toning

Toning on a coin is the change of colour brought about through oxidization, which forms a thin layer of tarnish on the metal's surface, typically as a result of interactions and chemical reactions with sulfur-containing compounds in the environment. Coin toning can vary in aesthetics, and thus can alternately add or detract from a coin's value. Coins with unusual toning colours or patterns tend to be valued by coin collectors. Toning is most common on silver coins, but can be found on coins minted from other metals and alloys, including gold, copper and cupronickel.

== Types of toning ==
Different colors and patterns of toning can have varying effects on a coin's grade and value. For example, brown spotty toning could decrease a coin's value, while colourful multi-coloured or 'rainbow' toning could increase it. Similarly, toning can raise or lower a coin's grade by several points, as grading is based on factors including eye appeal and not just wear. As toning is heavily influenced by the environment in which the toning took place, toned coins can come in many different colors and color combinations. Toning may cover an entire coin, just one side, or a single area. Coins which are stored in bags for a long time can develop crescent-shaped toning, where the toned coin was partially covered by one sitting off-center on top of it. This is common with Morgan dollars, which were typically delivered to and stored in banks in large cloth bags.

== Artificial toning ==
Coins are sometimes toned artificially through the use of chemicals or heat. This may be done by those seeking to increase their value, but unnatural toning on rare coins will reduce their value when detected. Coins with original surfaces are almost always preferable, although coins with extreme artificial toning, such as altered American Silver Eagles, are sometimes sold as novelties.

== See also ==
- Coin cleaning
- Coin grading
- Coin storage
