= Forton =

Forton may refer to:

- Forton, Hampshire, Test Valley, England, near Andover
- Forton, Gosport, a location in Hampshire, England
- Forton, Lancashire, England
- Forton, Somerset, England
- Forton, Shropshire, a location in England
- Forton, Staffordshire, England
- Forton, Tasmania, Australia
