= Fforde =

Fforde is an English surname, a variant of Ford. Notable people with the surname include:

- Adam Fforde, British economist
- Arthur fforde (1900–1985), British lawyer and businessman
- Cecil Fforde (1875–1951), British barrister, judge and diplomat
- Jasper Fforde (born 1961), English novelist, son of John
- Lady Jean Fforde (1920–2017), Scottish aristocrat and Arran landowner
- John Fforde (1921–2000), British economist, economic historian and Chief Cashier of the Bank of England from 1966 to 1970
- Katie Fforde (born 1952), English novelist
- Kay Baxter (dramatist) (1904–1994), born fforde, British dramatist, journalist and teacher

== See also ==
- Fforde Grene, public house and music venue in Leeds, England
- Forde (surname)
- Ford (surname)
