= Ford Cup =

Ford Cup may refer to:

- Ford Cup (tennis)
- Ford Cup – Defensive, renamed the Telus Cup – Defensive
- Ford Cup – Offensive, renamed the Telus Cup – Offensive

== See also ==
Ford Trophy
