= Tarnish =

Corrosion on outer layer of some metals

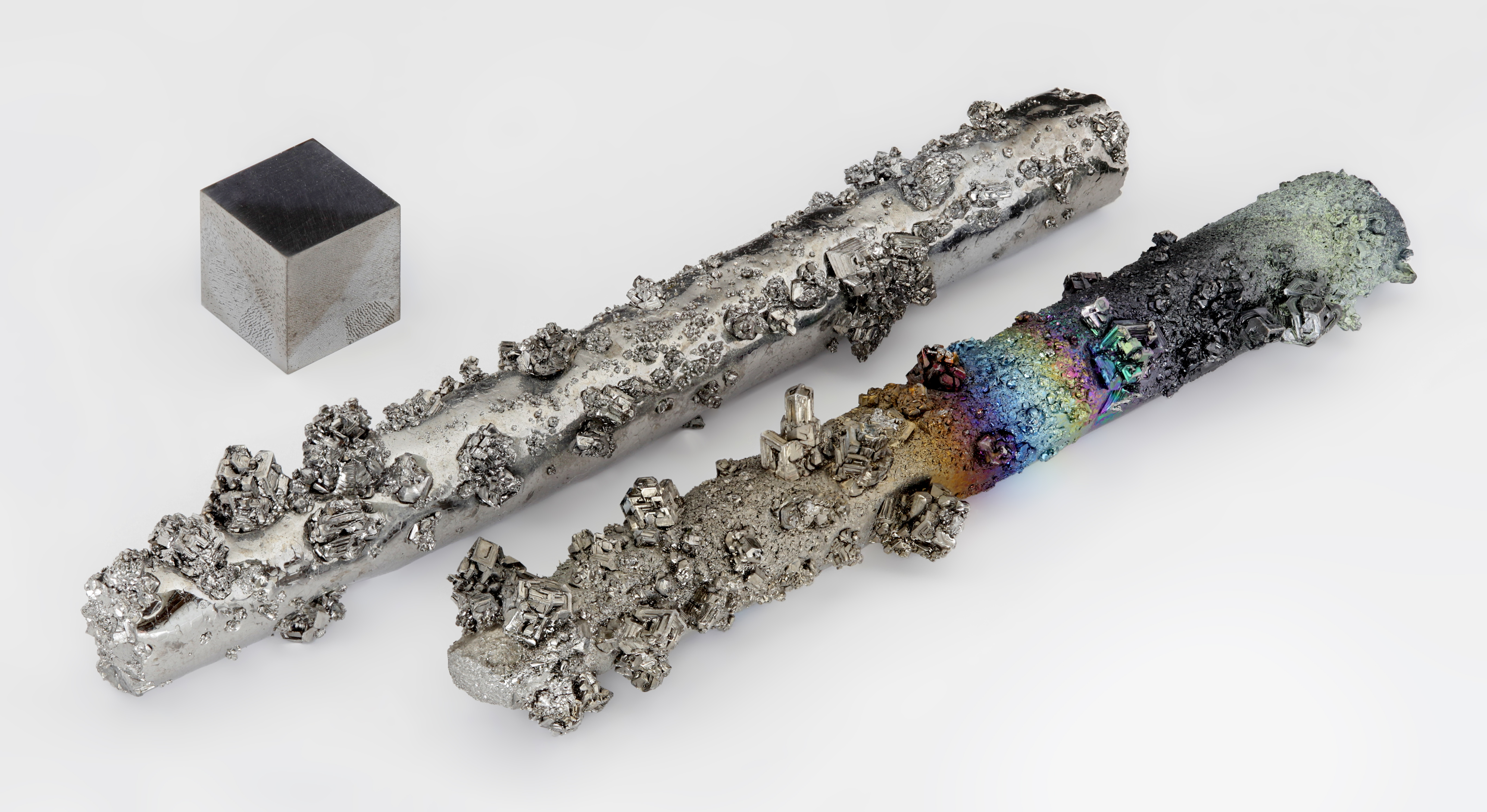
Tungsten rods with evaporated crystals, partially oxidized with colorful tarnish

Tarnish is a thin layer of corrosion that forms over copper, brass, aluminum, magnesium, neodymium and other similar metals as their outermost layer undergoes a chemical reaction. Tarnish does not always result from the sole effects of oxygen in the air. For example, silver needs hydrogen sulfide to tarnish, although it may tarnish with oxygen over time. It often appears as a dull, gray or black film or coating over metal. Tarnish is a surface phenomenon that is self-limiting, unlike rust. Only the top few layers of the metal react. The layer of tarnish seals and protects the underlying layers from reacting.

Tarnish preserves the underlying metal in outdoor use, and in this form is called chemical patina, an example of which is the green or blue-green form of copper(II) carbonate known as verdigris. Unlike patina advantageous in applications such as copper roofing and copper, bronze, and brass statues and fittings exposed to the elements, a chemical patina may be considered undesirable, as on silverware, or a matter of taste or convention, as in toning on coins.

== Chemistry ==
Tarnish is a product of a chemical reaction between a metal and a nonmetal compound, especially oxygen and sulfur dioxide. It is usually a metal oxide, the product of oxidation; sometimes it is a metal sulfide. The metal oxide sometimes reacts with water to make the hydroxide, or with carbon dioxide to make the carbonate. It is a chemical change. There are various methods to prevent metals from tarnishing.

== Prevention and removal ==
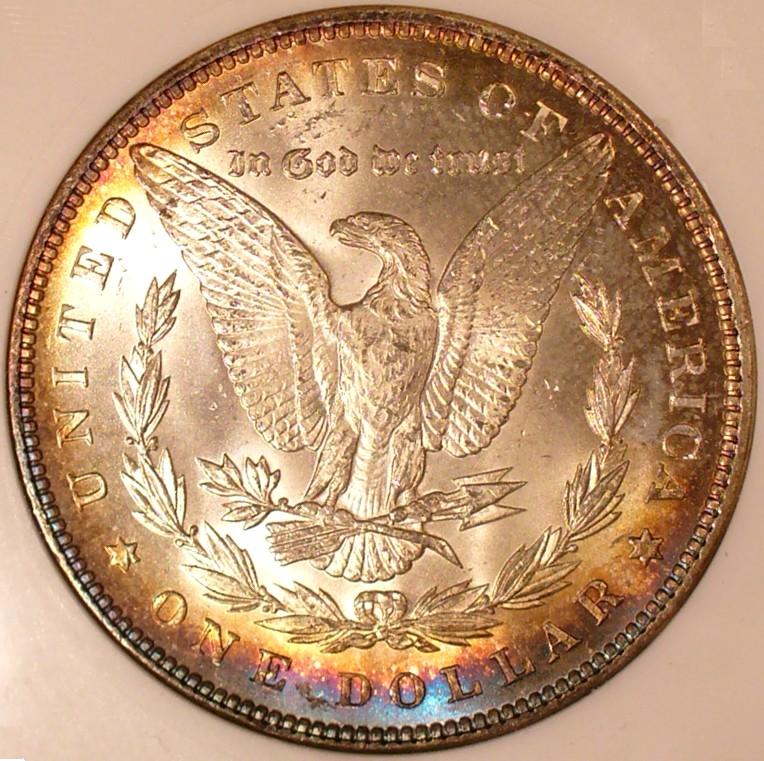
A Morgan dollar demonstrating a colorful form of toning on its reverse. While tarnish on other metal objects is generally cleaned off, some toning on coins may be considered aesthetically pleasing or beneficial to the coin's value, and is preserved.

Heavy tarnish can be mechanically removed by using tools such as a file or abrasive materials such as steel wool, sandpaper, emery paper, and heavy polishing compounds. Lighter tarnish may be abrasively removed with lighter polishing compounds or chemicals such as baking soda. Gentler abrasives, such as calcium carbonate, are often used by museums to clean tarnished silver, which will not scratch it or leave unwanted residues. Objects such as silverware may have their tarnish non-destructively reversed electrochemically by resting them on a piece of aluminium foil in a pot of boiling water with a small amount of salt or baking soda.

== See also ==
- Rust
