= Kay Baxter (dramatist) =

British dramatist, journalist and teacher

Kathleen Mary Carver Baxter (née fforde, 16 September 1904 – 3 January 1994), was a British dramatist, journalist and teacher.

== Early life ==
She was born in Bulandshahr, British India, on 16 September 1904, the eldest daughter of Arthur Brownlow fforde, a judge in the Indian Civil Service, and his wife, Mary Alice fforde, née Branson. Her elder brother was Arthur Frederic Brownlow fforde. She was educated at seven different schools plus St Albans High School, followed by Newnham College, Cambridge, where she earned a degree in modern and medieval languages in 1927, followed by two years at the Royal Academy of Dramatic Art.

== Career ==
From 1944 to 1966, Baxter was the Secretary of the Cambridge University Women's Appointments Board.

In 1963 Baxter was elected a fellow of Newnham College, Cambridge, and from 1963 to 1966, she was Tutor and Director of Studies in Theology there.

Baxter wrote three successful religious dramas: Pull Devil, Pull Baker in 1947, a verse mime with music, Gerald of Wales, and Play your Trumpets Angels, for the Southwark Cathedral Festival of Britain pageant, both in 1951.

She published books including Speak what we Feel: a Christian Looks at the Contemporary Theatre in 1964, And I look for the resurrection in 1968, and The Silver Dove, with C. Le Fleming, in 1970.

In 1971, she became the first woman to conduct the Good Friday service in Westminster Abbey.

== Personal life ==
On 5 November 1931, she married fellow actor and stage director, Major (Frank) Godfrey Baxter RE MC. He died in 1943, when his plane crashed on the runway during take-off.

== Later life ==
She died at Soham, Cambridgeshire on 3 January 1994.
