= Fords =

Fords may refer to:

- Ford (crossing), a shallow crossing on a river

== Places ==
- Fords, New Jersey
- Fords, South Australia

== See also ==
- Ford (disambiguation)
- Ford Motor Company
- Ford's Theatre, Washington D.C., U.S.
