= Coin board =

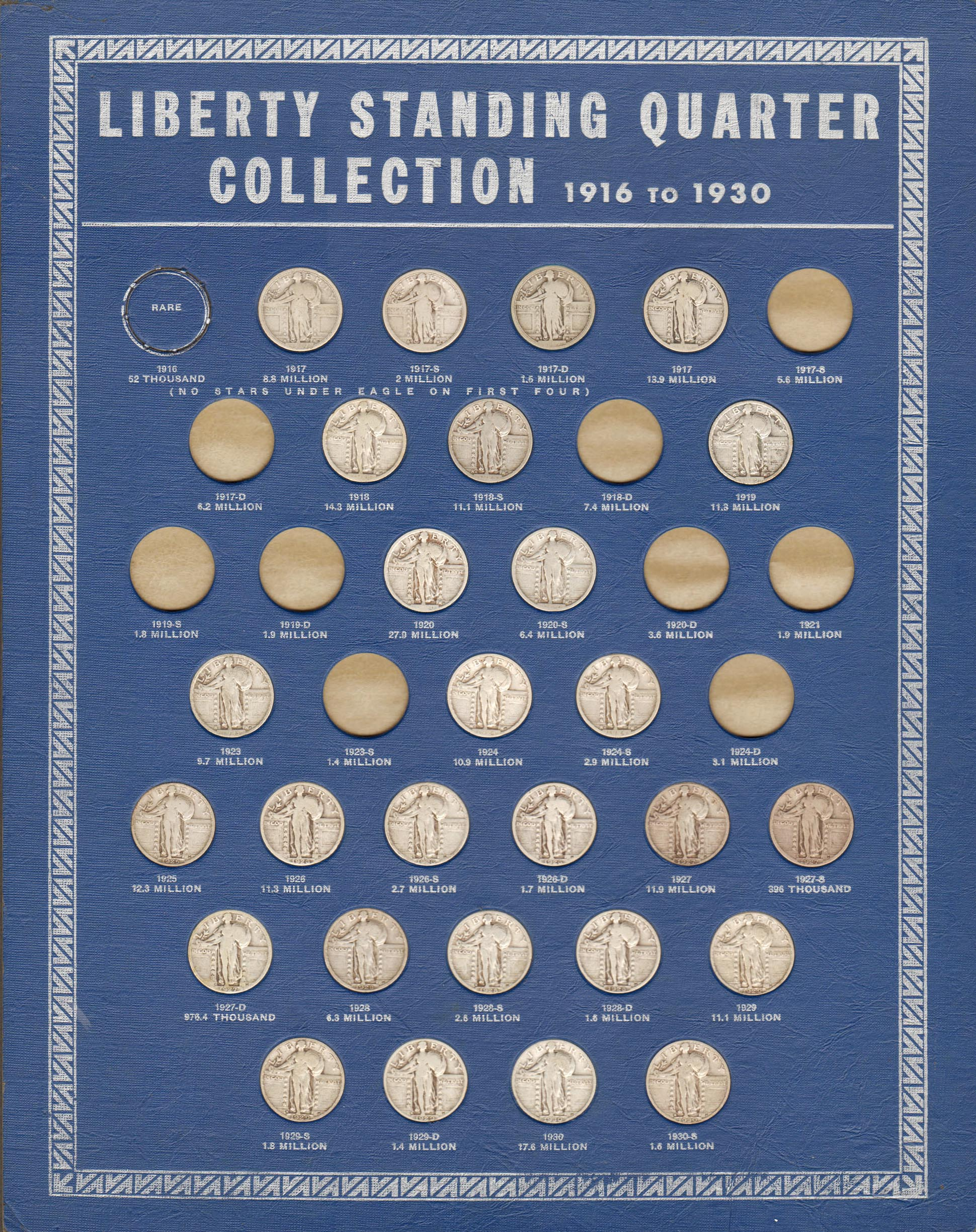
A coin board for collecting Liberty Standing Quarters published by Whitman in 1939

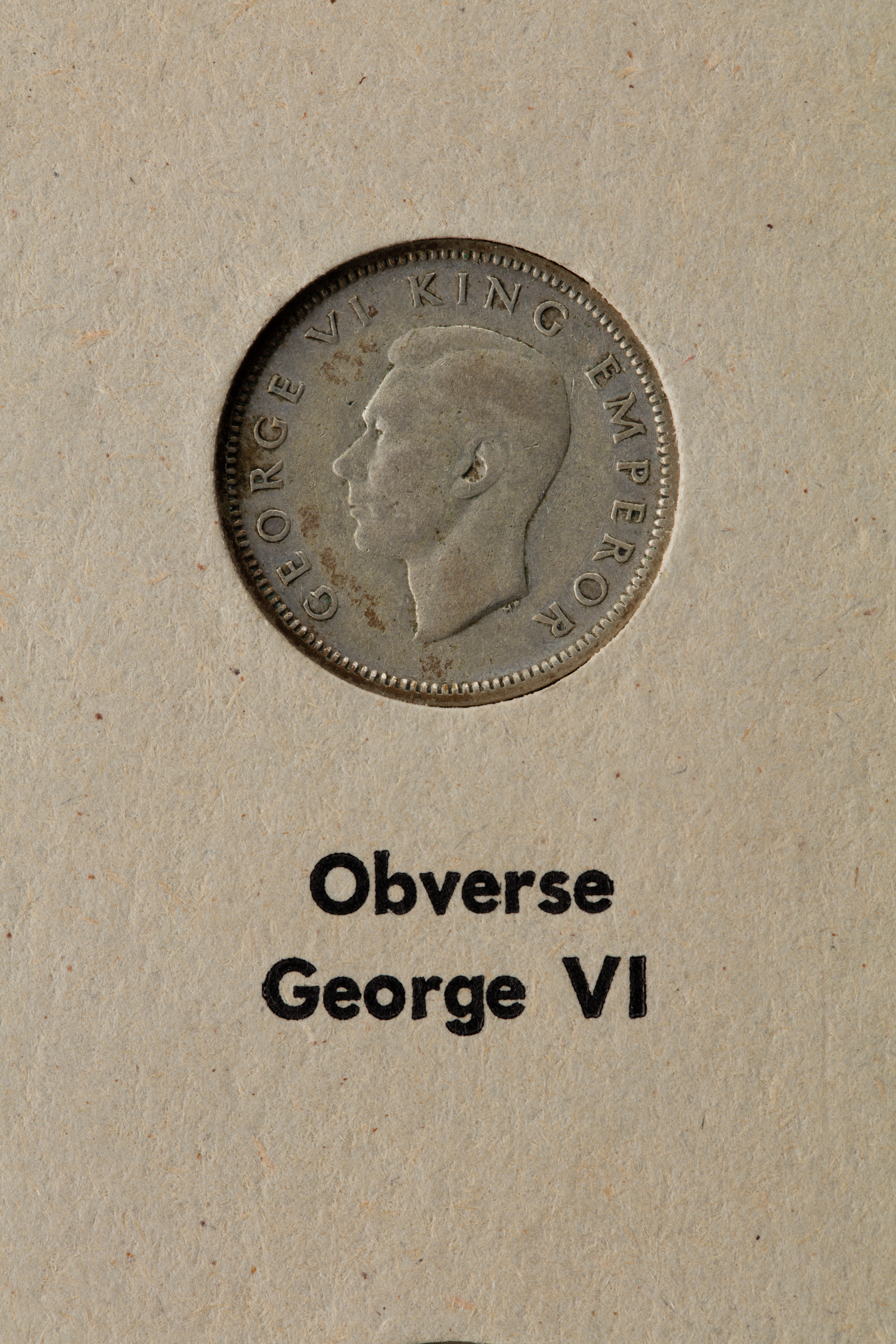
A New Zealand sixpence in a coin board

A coin collecting board is intended for coin collectors to assemble a complete set of dates and mints for a particular coin series.

== Description ==
It consists of a strip of cardboard, typically measuring 11 inches wide by 14 inches tall, with holes punched into it the size of the particular coins. A face paper having the same hole pattern carries the appropriate text and graphics. This typically consists of dates and mintmarks printed beneath each opening, sometimes with the addition of the number of pieces coined for that issue. A bold title for the coin series will appear at the top of the board, and the bottom of the face will have publication and copyright information. On some coin boards the bottom of the face will also provide some historical and technical information about the coin series, as well as misguided instructions for cleaning coins. On the most common coin boards, those published by Whitman, this information was later moved to the back of the board, and this is more typical for other publishers, too.

== Invention and commercial success ==
The coin collecting board was invented in 1934 by Joseph Kent Post, an engineer with Kimberly-Clark in Neenah, Wisconsin. His knowledge of paper products and their manufacture, combined with his interest in coin collecting, prompted him to devise this inexpensive means to collect coins. Debuting early in 1935, his first coin boards—one for Indian Head nickels and another for Lincoln cents—were priced at 25 cents retail, and these quickly proved successful. Sold at newsstands, stationery stores, variety stores, and similar retail outlets, coin boards were the point of entry for thousands of new coin collectors between 1935 and 1942, after which most publishers discontinued them in favor of the more convenient coin folders still used today.

== Producers ==
Post marketed his coin boards under the Kent Co. Coin Card brand. Later in 1935, Post sold his invention to Whitman Publishing of Racine, Wisconsin, which was already a leading producer of puzzles, games and other paper novelties. Whitman became the most prolific of coin board producers and had the most extensive list of coin series titles. Other publishers of coin boards included Colonial Coin & Stamp Company and Gramercy Stamp Company, both located in New York City, J. Oberwise & Company and Lincoln Printing Company, both located in Los Angeles, California, and Earl & Koehler of Portland, Oregon. Whitman and Oberwise boards are seen with some frequency, but the other companies' boards are fairly scarce, those of Gramercy and E & K being genuinely rare.

== As a collectable ==
Coin collecting boards have been retired from their original usage for the most part, and all are now considered quite collectable. Their collector value varies with their relative rarity and condition.
