= Arthur Ford =

Arthur Ford may refer to:

- Arthur Ford (Australian footballer) (1881–1953), Australian rules footballer
- Arthur Ford (footballer, born 1911) (1911–?), English association footballer
- Arthur Ford (geologist), surveyor responsible for naming mountains such as Anderson Summit
- Arthur Ford (journalist) (1886–1968), Canadian journalist
- Arthur Ford (psychic) (1897–1971), American psychic, spiritual medium and clairaudient
- Arthur Ford (wrestler) (1903–?), Australian Olympic wrestler
- Arthur C. Ford (1892–1985), water commissioner NYC
- Arthur Ford, protagonist of VR game Boneworks
