= Coin folder =

Coin collecting folder

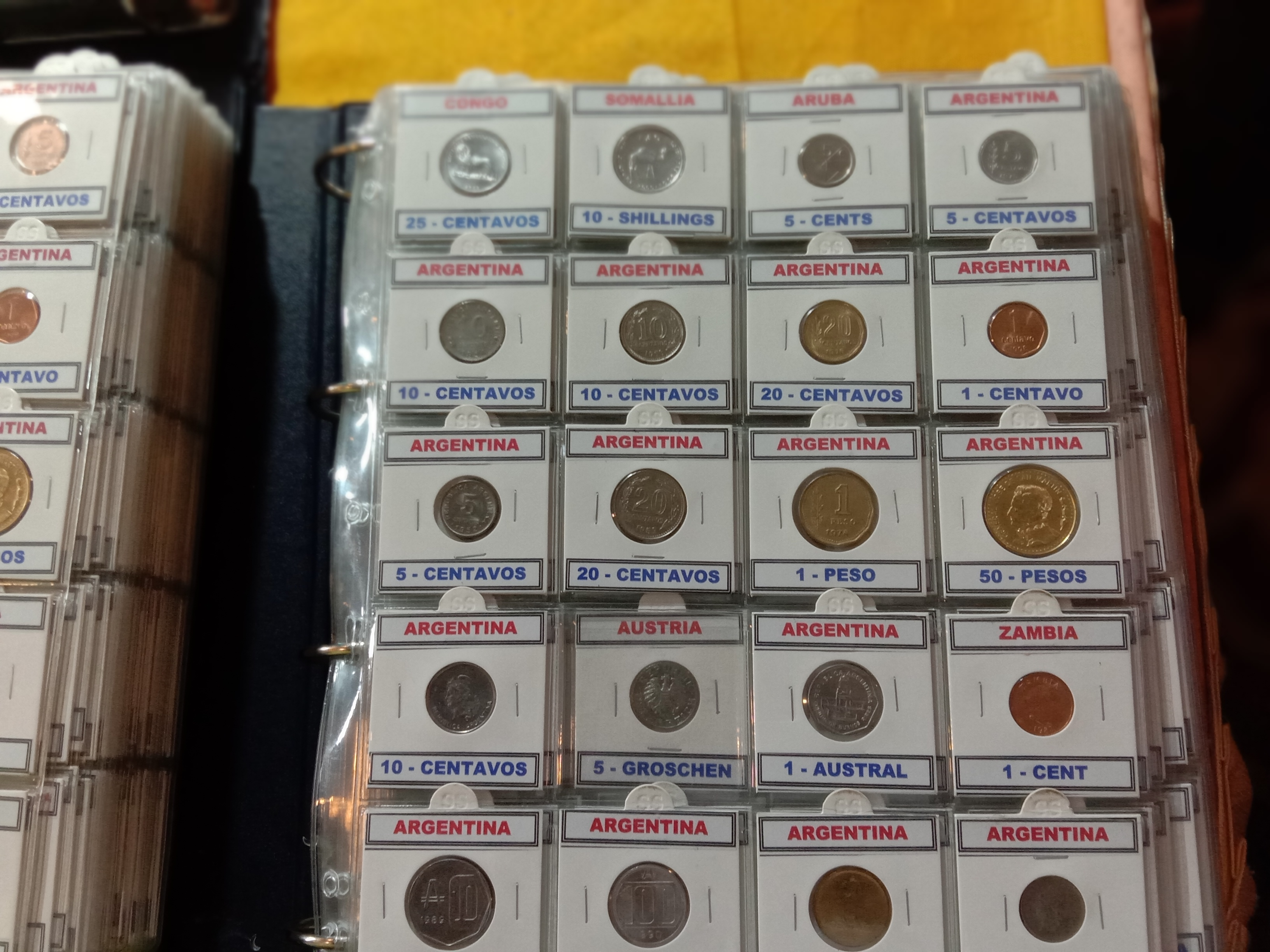
A coin folder with plastic compartments

Coin folders are used as a coin storage method to protect coins from the elements.

== History ==
Protection for coins was historically only available to affluent collectors who stored their coins in custom cabinets. The first attempt at creating an album or folder like structure for coins came in 1929, when The Beistle Company began marketing coin albums. These albums were made of heavy cardstock covered in paper on both sides, with cellophane to hold the coins in place, each page was hole-punched on the side to fit into a binder. Prohibitive costs meant that these were only available to confirmed collectors at the time. This changed when J.K. Post in collaboration with The Whitman Company invented the inexpensive coin board in 1934. Coin boards were a huge success as they offered collectors of all types a way to store their coins inexpensively.

The modern day coin folder's invention is disputed by two major rivals. One take has that the folders were invented by R.S. Yeoman of The Whitman Company just before World War II. Yeoman took the old penny board design and simply folded over the portions to create a book (or folder). The other take contends that the folders were devised and first sold by the Daniel Stamp Company (DANSCO) of Los Angeles in 1939 or early 1940. In either case, this rivalry continues to the present day as both companies have made "high quality" folders for collectors since the 1940s.

Creating a book for the coins offers some protection for the coins, and made storage easier as the folders are small in comparison to the former boards. Coin folders have since become available to collectors worldwide with folders made specifically to fit the coins circulating in their respective countries.

== Major coin folder brands ==
- Daniel Stamp Company (DANSCO)
- Littleton Coin Company
- Warmen's
- Whitman Publishing

- H.E. Harris (Imprint of Whitman)
