= Jonathan Ford =

Jonathan Ford or Jon Ford may refer to:

== Politicians ==
- Jon Ford (Australian politician) (born 1958), Australian politician
- Jon Ford (American politician) (born 1972), Indiana State Senator

== Sportspeople ==
- Jon Ford (footballer) (born 1968), English former footballer
- Johnathon Ford (born 1989), Australian rugby league footballer
- Jonathan Ford (American football) (born 1998), American football player
- Lew Ford (Jon Lewis Ford, born 1976), Major League Baseball outfielder

== Fictional characters ==
- Commander Jonathan Ford, a character on the American TV series seaQuest DSV
- Professor Jon Ford, a character on the British TV series The Innocence Project

== See also ==
- Ford (surname)
- John Ford (disambiguation)
