= Andrew Ford =

Andrew Ford may refer to:

- Andrew Ford (Australian footballer) (born 1970), Australian rules footballer
- Andrew Ford (composer) (born 1957), English and Australian composer, writer and radio presenter
- Andrew Ford (courtier) (born 1957), British Army officer, Comptroller of the Lord Chamberlain's Office
- Andrew Ford (cricketer) (born 1963), former Bahamian cricketer
- Andrew Ford (swimmer) (born 1989), Canadian swimmer
- Andrew Ford (water polo) (born 1995), Australian water polo player
- Andrew L. Ford (born 1952), American classicist
- Andy Ford (English footballer) (born 1954), association football manager
- Andy Ford (comedian), British comedian, performer, and writer

== See also ==
- Andy Fordham (1962–2021), English darts player
- Ford (surname)
