= Michael Ford =

Michael Ford or Mike Ford is the name of:

== Arts and entertainment ==
- Michael Ford (artist) (1920–2005), English artist
- Michael Ford (engraver) (died 1758), Irish engraver
- Michael C. Ford (born 1939), American poet, playwright, editor and recording artist
- Michael Curtis Ford, American historical novelist
- Michael D. Ford (1928–2018), English film set director
- Michael Thomas Ford (born 1968), American novelist
- Mike Ford (musician), Canadian singer-songwriter
- Mick Ford (born 1952), British actor and screenwriter
- John M. Ford (1957–2006), also known as Mike Ford, American science-fiction writer and game designer

== Sports ==
Gridiron football

- Michael Ford (gridiron football) (born 1990), American football running back
- Mike Ford (cornerback) (born 1995), American football cornerback
- Mike Ford (quarterback) (born 1959), American football quarterback, led NCAA in passing in 1978

Other

- Michael Ford (Australian footballer) (born 1962), former Australian rules footballer
- Mike Ford (baseball) (born 1992), American baseball player
- Mike Ford (footballer) (born 1966), English former footballer
- Mike Ford (ice hockey) (born 1952), Canadian former major league ice hockey player
- Mike Ford (NASCAR) (born 1970), American NASCAR Sprint Cup crew chief
- Mike Ford (rugby) (born 1965), English rugby coach and former rugby player

== Other ==
- Michael Ford (politician) (born 1994), Toronto councillor, nephew of former mayor of Toronto Rob Ford
- Michael Gerald Ford (born 1950), son of former President of the United States Gerald Ford
- Michael W. Ford (born 1976), American occultist, author, and musician
- C. Michael Ford, American businessman, activist
- Michael Ford (architect), American architect
- Michael Ford (mayor), mayor of Manawatū District in New Zealand
- Michael Ford, the main protagonist of the Conduit video game series
