= Ford, Newfoundland and Labrador =

Unincorporated community

Coordinates: 56°27′59″N 61°11′33″W

Ford
- Settlement
- Interactive map of Ford
- Country: Canada
- Province: Newfoundland and Labrador
- Region: Labrador
- Time zone: AST (UTC−04:00)
  - Summer (DST): ADT (UTC−03:00)
- Area code(s): 709, 879

Ford is a settlement in Newfoundland and Labrador.
