= Johnford =

Taiwanese manufacturing company

- Industry: Manufacturing
- Founded: 1984; 42 years ago
- Products: Metal Working Machines
- Number of employees: ~50
- Website: www.johnford.com.tw

Johnford, also known as Rountop, is a CNC machine tool manufacturing company based in Taiwan.
