= Bruce Ford =

Bruce Ford may refer to:

- Bruce Ford (rower) (born 1954), Canadian men's quadruple sculls rower in the 1984 Olympics
- Bruce Ford (tenor) (born 1956), American operatic tenor
