= Foley Park =

Coordinates: 51.282°N 0.532°E

- Location within Kent
- Population: 367
- District: Maidstone
- Shire county: Kent
- Region: South East
- Country: England
- Sovereign state: United Kingdom
- Post town: Maidstone
- Postcode district: Medway
- Dialling code: 01622
- Police: Kent
- Fire: Kent
- Ambulance: South East Coast

Foley Park is a suburb of Northern Maidstone. Its closest village is Penenden Heath and is very close to the A249 and has easy access to the M20 motorway.

The area dates back to 1856 when the land was bought by a rich lord who named it Foley Park after its parkland appearance. The land was bought back by the council.

Its population grew from 14 in 1935, to 357 in 2007.
