= Forstal =

Coordinates: 51.303575°N 0.493097°E

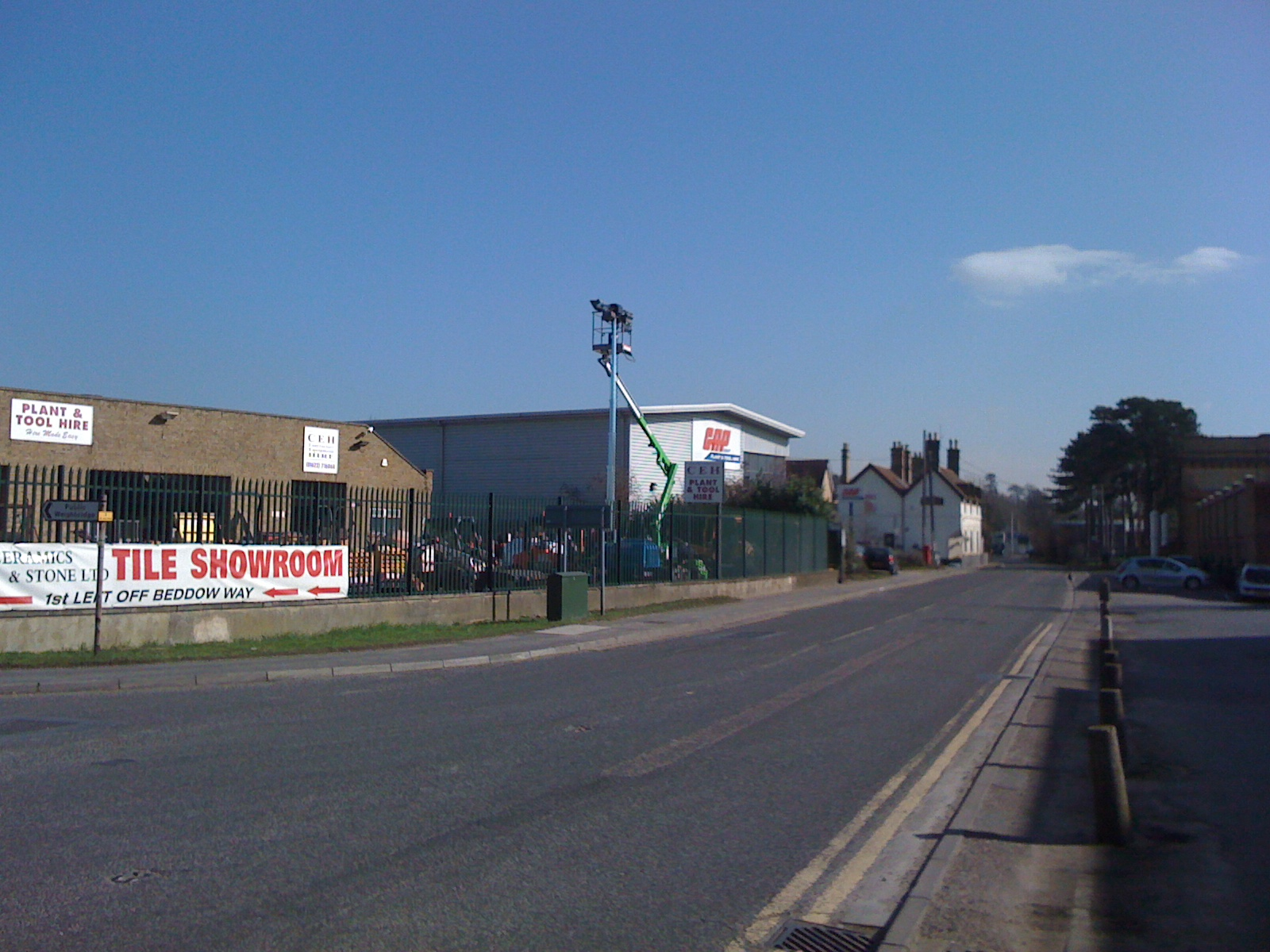
- Forstal Road, Forstal

- Location within Kent
- District: Tonbridge and Malling
- Shire county: Kent
- Region: South East
- Country: England
- Sovereign state: United Kingdom
- Police: Kent
- Fire: Kent
- Ambulance: South East Coast

Forstal is a settlement in Aylesford parish in Kent, England.
