= Greg Ford =

Greg Ford may refer to:

- Greg Ford (animator), American animator, director, historian and consultant to Warner Bros
- Greg Ford (cricketer) (born 1992), Irish cricketer
- Greg Ford (North Carolina politician), American educator and politician from North Carolina
- Greg Ford (South Carolina politician), American politician from South Carolina
