= John Ford (American football coach) =

American football coach

Biographical details
- Education: Holy Cross

Coaching career (HC unless noted)
- 1905–1906: Marquette

Head coaching record
- Overall: 4–8–2

John Ford was an American college football coach. He served as the fifth head football coach at Marquette University during the 1905 and 1906 seasons. His coaching record at Marquette was 4–8–2. This ranks him 13th at Marquette in total wins and 15th at Marquette in winning percentage (.393). Having been a graduate of the College of the Holy Cross (where he played football), Ford was also the first paid coach at Marquette.

== Head coaching record ==
Year	Team	Overall	Conference	Standing	Bowl/playoffs
Marquette Blue and Gold (Independent) (1905–1906)
1905	Marquette	3–4			
1906	Marquette	1–4–2			
Marquette:		4–8–2			
Total:		4–8–2			
