= Fonston =

Coordinates: 50.692°N 4.530°W

- Location within Cornwall
- OS grid reference: SX214912
- Civil parish: Warbstow
- Unitary authority: Cornwall
- Ceremonial county: Cornwall
- Region: South West
- Country: England
- Sovereign state: United Kingdom
- Post town: LAUNCESTON
- Postcode district: PL15
- Dialling code: 01566
- Police: Devon and Cornwall
- Fire: Cornwall
- Ambulance: South Western
- UK Parliament: North Cornwall

Fonston is a hamlet 8 miles (13 km) north-west of Launceston in Cornwall, England. Fonston lies at around 495 metres (1,624 ft) above sea level on the road from Warbstow to Canworthy Water.
