= John Joseph Ford =

American judge

Presiding Justice of the California Court of Appeal, Second Circuit, Division 3
- In office December 16, 1966 – September 30, 1977
- Appointed by: Governor Pat Brown
- Preceded by: Clement Lawrence Shinn
- Succeeded by: Joan Dempsey Klein

Personal details
- Born: October 10, 1907 Los Angeles, CA
- Died: August 4, 1982 (aged 74) Newport Beach, CA
- Spouse: Virginia
- Children: Josephine Consuelo Antonia Ford; John Joseph Ford; Stephen Francis Ford
- Education: Stanford University; Harvard Law School

John Joseph Ford (October 10, 1907 – August 4, 1982) was a Presiding Justice of the California Second District Court of Appeal, Division Three from 1966 to 1977, having been appointed to the post by Governor Pat Brown, who had previously appointed him to the same court as an associate justice in 1959.

Born in Los Angeles, California, Ford received an A.B. from Stanford University in 1928 and an LL.B. from Harvard Law School in 1931. From 1931 to 1941, he was an attorney in Los Angeles. From 1934 to 1941, Ford was a professor at Loyola Law School—the school where his father was the founding dean. From 1941 to 1943, he was the Chief Enforcement Attorney in Los Angeles for the Office of Price Administration, the newly established federal agency responsible for rent and price controls (the OPA was abolished in 1946).

In 1943, Governor Earl Warren appointed Ford to the Los Angeles County Municipal Court, where he served until 1948 when Warren elevated him to the Los Angeles County Superior Court. Ford left the Superior Court when Governor Pat Brown appointed Ford to the California Second District Court of Appeal, Division Three in 1959. Brown elevated Ford to Presiding Justice of the same court in 1966. Ford retired in 1977 and died in Newport Beach, California in 1982.

== Childhood ==
Ford was one of three children of father William Joseph Ford and Margaret McCarthy. The other 2 were Robert and Margaret. Ford's mother died when he was four years old. Ford's father later remarried Cecily Chambers and had 7 more children: Liam, Moira, Patrick, James, Declan, Joe Brendan, and Derrick. John Joseph Ford went on to graduate from Loyola High School. Robert "Bob" Ford, Moira Ford, Patrick Ford and James Ford also became practicing attorneys in California.

== Family ==
Ford and his wife Virginia had three children: Josephine Consuelo Antonia Ford, John Joseph Ford, and Stephen Francis Ford. Between his three children, Ford had nineteen grandchildren.

Legal offices
| Preceded by Clement Lawrence Shinn | Presiding Justice of the California Court of Appeal; Second District, Division Three; December 16, 1966 – September 30, 1977 | Succeeded by Joan Dempsey Klein |
| Preceded by Parker Wood | Associate Justice of the California Court of Appeal; Second District, Division Three; November 16, 1959 – December 16, 1966 | Succeeded by James A. Cobey |
