= The Ford (painting) =

1644 painting by Claude Lorrain

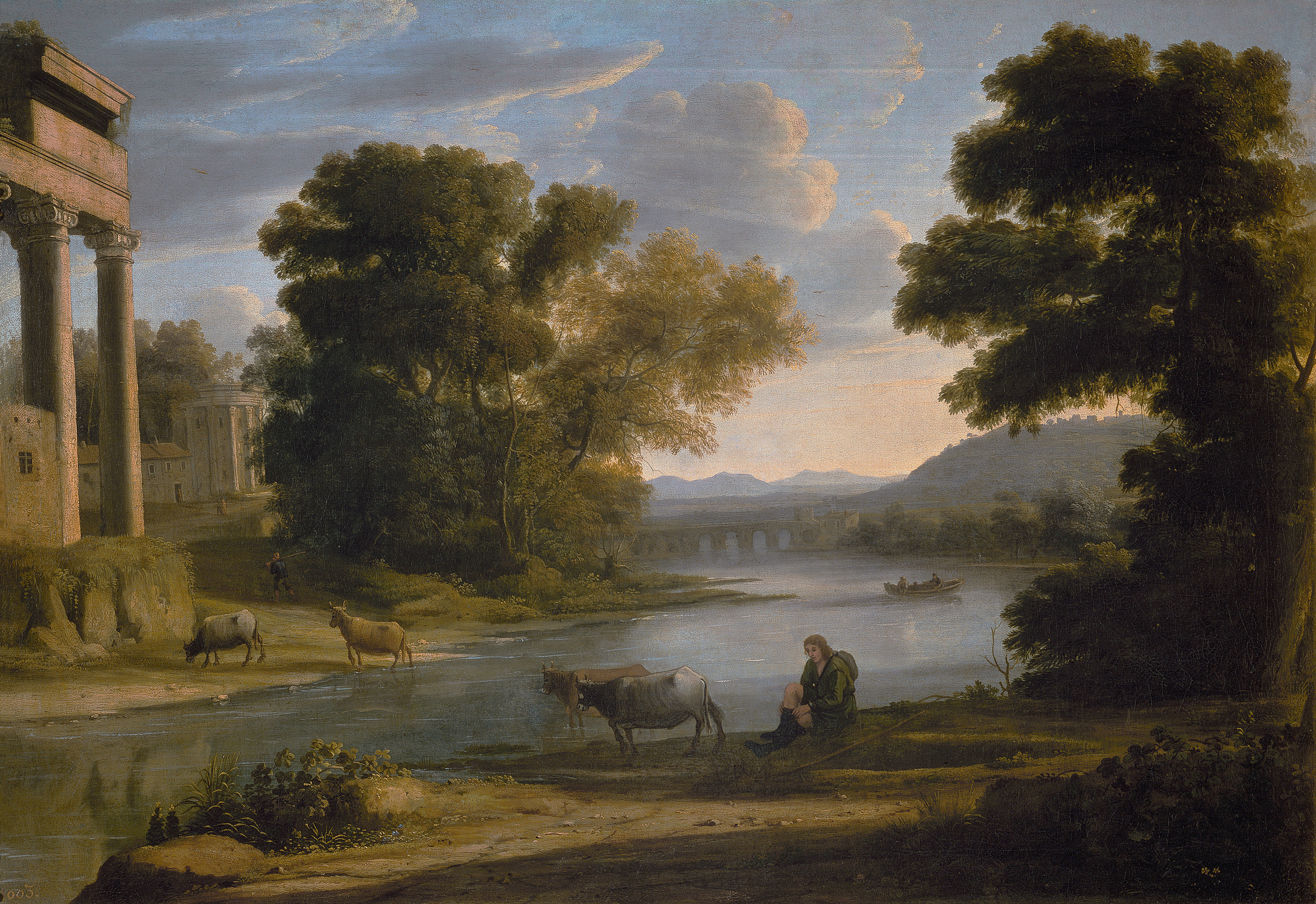
- Artist: Claude Lorrain
- Year: 1644; 382 years ago
- Medium: oil on canvas
- Dimensions: 68 cm × 99 cm (27 in × 39 in)
- Location: Museo del Prado, Madrid

The Ford or Landscape with Shepherds is a 1644 oil-on-canvas painting by the French artist Claude Lorrain, now in the Prado Museum, in Madrid.

It was recorded in 1746 in the collection of Philip V of Spain in the Royal Palace of La Granja de San Ildefonso. It was in the Royal Palace of Aranjuez from at least 1794 until at least 1827.

== Bibliography ==
- (in Spanish) Luna, Juan José (1984). Claudio de Lorena y el ideal clásico de paisaje en el siglo XVII. Madrid: Ministerio de Cultura, Dirección General de Bellas Artes y Archivos. ISBN 84-500-9899-8.
- (in Spanish) Röthlisberger, Marcel; Cecchi, Doretta (1982). La obra pictórica completa de Claudio de Lorena. Barcelona: Noguer. ISBN 84-279-8770-6.
- (in Spanish) Sureda, Joan (2001). Summa Pictorica VI. La fastuosidad de lo Barroco. Barcelona: Planeta. ISBN 84-08-36134-1.
