= Jewel Forde =

Television presenter and producer

Jewel Forde is a television producer and presenter with the Caribbean Broadcasting Corporation in Barbados. She has hosted "Monitor" and worked as an announcer on CBC 900 AM radio. She is also joint public relations officer for the Barbados Association of Journalists.

Forde has a Diploma in Mass Communications from University of the West Indies in Jamaica and a master's degree in Journalism Studies from the University of Cardiff.
