= Ford High School =

Ford High School may refer to:

- Henry Ford High School (Detroit, Michigan), U.S.
- Edsel Ford High School, Dearborn, Michigan, U.S.
- Henry Ford II High School, Sterling Heights, Michigan, U.S.
- Ford High School, Quinlan, Texas, U.S.
