= Ford Library =

Ford Library may refer to:

- Gerald R. Ford Presidential Library, at the University of Michigan
- Henry Ford Centennial Library, the main branch of the Dearborn Public Libraries
- Ford Library, the library of Duke University's Fuqua School of Business
- M. Burch Tracy Ford Library, the library of Miss Porter's School
