= Richard Ford (disambiguation) =

Richard Ford (born 1944) is an American novelist and short story writer.

Richard Ford may also refer to:

- Sir Richard Ford (Southampton MP) (c. 1614–1678), English merchant and politician, MP for Southampton 1661–1678
- Richard Ford (ironmaster) at Coalbrookdale, England, in the 18th century
- Richard Ford (East Grinstead MP) (1758–1806), English politician, MP for East Grinstead 1789–1790, Appleby 1790–1791
- Richard Ford (English writer) (1796–1858), English writer
- Sir Richard Ford (Royal Marines officer) (1878–1949), British Royal Marines general
- Richard Ford (music editor), British music editor and music producer
- Richard Thompson Ford, professor of law at Stanford Law School

== See also ==
- Richard Foord, British Liberal Democrat politician
- Ricky Ford (born 1954), American saxophonist
