= Arthur Ford (journalist) =

Arthur Ford (1886–1968) was editor-in-chief of The London Free Press, of London, Ontario. He joined the Winnipeg Telegram in 1911 as the paper's parliamentary correspondent. He subsequently worked at the Ottawa Journal, and the Toronto Times before joining The London Free Press as managing editor, before becoming their editor-in-chief.

He first taught a journalism course at the University of Western Ontario in 1922, and founded the journalism school there in 1945. He was subsequently chancellor of the university.

He was inducted into the Canadian News Hall of Fame in 1966, one of the first three people togiven that honour.

He received an honorary degree of LL.D. in 1949 from the University of Toronto.

He has an elementary school named after him in London, Ontario.
