= Arthur fforde =

Sir Arthur Frederic Brownlow fforde (Note: The surname fforde is spelled with two initial lowercase F's.) GBE (23 August 1900 – 26 June 1985) was an English solicitor, civil servant, headmaster, writer and businessman.

Arthur fforde was educated at Rugby School (SH 1914–1919, Head of School) and Trinity College, Oxford. As a solicitor, he became a partner in the law firm Linklaters & Paines (now known as Linklaters) and also had helped establish the Unit trust. He was appointed a Knight Bachelor in the 1946 New Year Honours, having served as an Under-Secretary in the Treasury. In 1948 he returned to Rugby as head master, remaining until 1957, when he became Chairman of the BBC. In 1964 he retired after a spell of ill-health and was appointed a Knight Grand Cross of the Order of the British Empire the same year.

Occasional verses by Arthur fforde were published later in his life, until his death in 1985.

== Notes ==
Media offices
Preceded by Alexander Cadogan	Chairman of the BBC Board of Governors; 1957–1964	Succeeded by Norman Craven Brook
Academic offices
Preceded by Percy Hugh Beverley Lyon	Headmaster of Rugby School; 1948–1957	Succeeded by Walter Hamilton
