= Forder, Cornwall =

Village in Cornwall, England

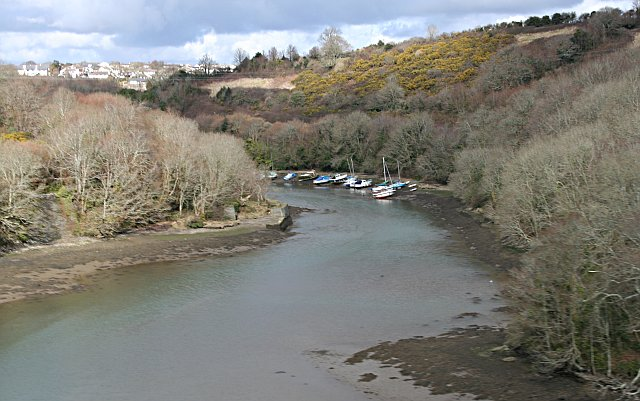
Forder Lake

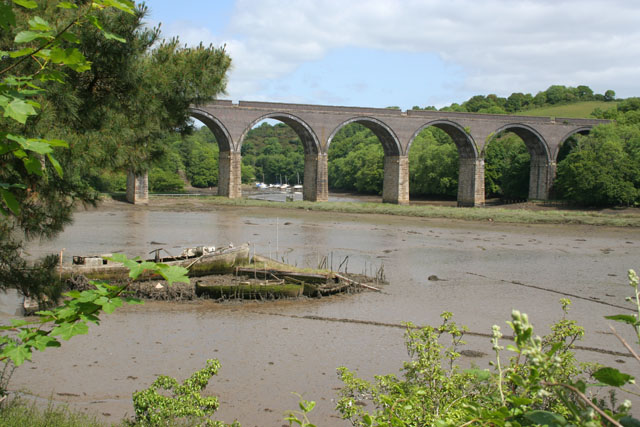
Forder viaduct

Forder is a village near Saltash in Cornwall, England.

Forder viaduct was formerly at Milepost 252.25, 1.25 miles (2.0 km) west of Saltash (50.395087°N 4.231024°W). It was a Class C viaduct 67 feet (20 m) high and 606 feet (185 m) long on 16 trestles. It was demolished after the line was diverted to a more inland alignment on 19 May 1908, and replaced by a stone viaduct on the new alignment.

The village made headlines after a lorry became wedged between a house and a wall on a narrow street after the driver took a wrong turning on the morning of 30 September 2024.
