= John Ford (footballer, born 1893) =

Scottish footballer

Personal information
- Full name: John Ford
- Date of birth: 1893
- Place of birth: Wishaw, Scotland
- Date of death: 3 May 1917 (aged 23–24)
- Place of death: Pas-de-Calais, France
- Height: 5 ft 8 in (1.73 m)
- Position: Outside right

Senior career*
Years	Team	Apps	(Gls)
- Bellshill Athletic
1913–1915	Preston North End	43	(4)
- * Club domestic league appearances and goals

John Ford (1893 – 3 May 1917) was a Scottish professional footballer who played as an outside right in the Football League for Preston North End.

== Personal life ==
After working in munitions in Scotland, Ford was called up to serve as a private in the Cameronians (Scottish Rifles) during the First World War. He was killed in France on 3 May 1917 and is commemorated on the Arras Memorial.

== Career statistics ==
Appearances and goals by club, season and competition
Club	Season	League			National Cup		Total	
Club	Season	Division	Apps	Goals	Apps	Goals	Apps	Goals
Preston North End	1914–15	Second Division	25	2	2	0	27	1
Career total			25	2	2	0	27	1

== Honours ==
Preston North End

- Football League Second Division second-place promotion: 1914–15
