= USS Ford =

USS Ford may refer to the following ships operated by the United States Navy:

- USS Gerald R. Ford (CVN-78), named for former President Gerald Ford, is the lead vessel of her class of aircraft carriers. She was commissioned in 2017.
- USS John D. Ford (DD-228), named for John D. Ford, was a World War II destroyer
- USS Ford (FFG-54), named for Patrick O. Ford, is an Oliver Hazard Perry-class frigate, decommissioned in 2013.
