= Forde (surname) =

- Language: Irish

Other gender
- Masculine: Forde, Mac Giollarnáth
- Feminine: Forde, Nic Giollarnáth, Mhic Giollarnáth

Origin
- Origin: Connemara, Éire
- Meaning: Mac Giolla na Naomh, (Son of the [servant of the saints])

Other names
- Anglicisations: Forde, Ford (surname)

Forde (Irish: Mac Giollarnáth) is an Irish surname derived from a number of Irish families.

== History ==
=== Mac Giolla Naomh and Mac Giollarnáth ===
"Mac Giolla Naomh," meaning "son of the devotee of the saints" was an Irish clann or sept that originated in southern Connemara, Connacht. Over the years, however, "Mac Giolla Naomh," which was incorrectly transcribed as Mac Giollarnáth, and then erroneously translated as Ford (surname) or Forde, from the resemblance of the final syllable to Áth, a ford (crossing).

=== Ó Fuartháin (Fuaráin) ===
Lastly, in County Cork and County Waterford, the name was an Anglicised version of Ó Fuaráin, meaning "descendant of Fuarthán". The personal name Fuartháin, derived from the Irish language word fuar (meaning "cold"), was once taken to represent the Irish word fuarathán (meaning "cold little ford"), which led to the surname being translated as Ford (surname) or Forde although more often it was Anglicised as Foran. The ancestor of Henry Ford (USA) came from County Cork in 1847.

== Notable people with the surname Forde include ==
- Seán Mac Giollarnáth (1880–1970), Irish folklorist
- Bernie Forde (born 1957), Irish hurler
- Brinsley Forde (born 1952), Guyanese actor and musician
- Brooke Forde (born 1999), American swimmer

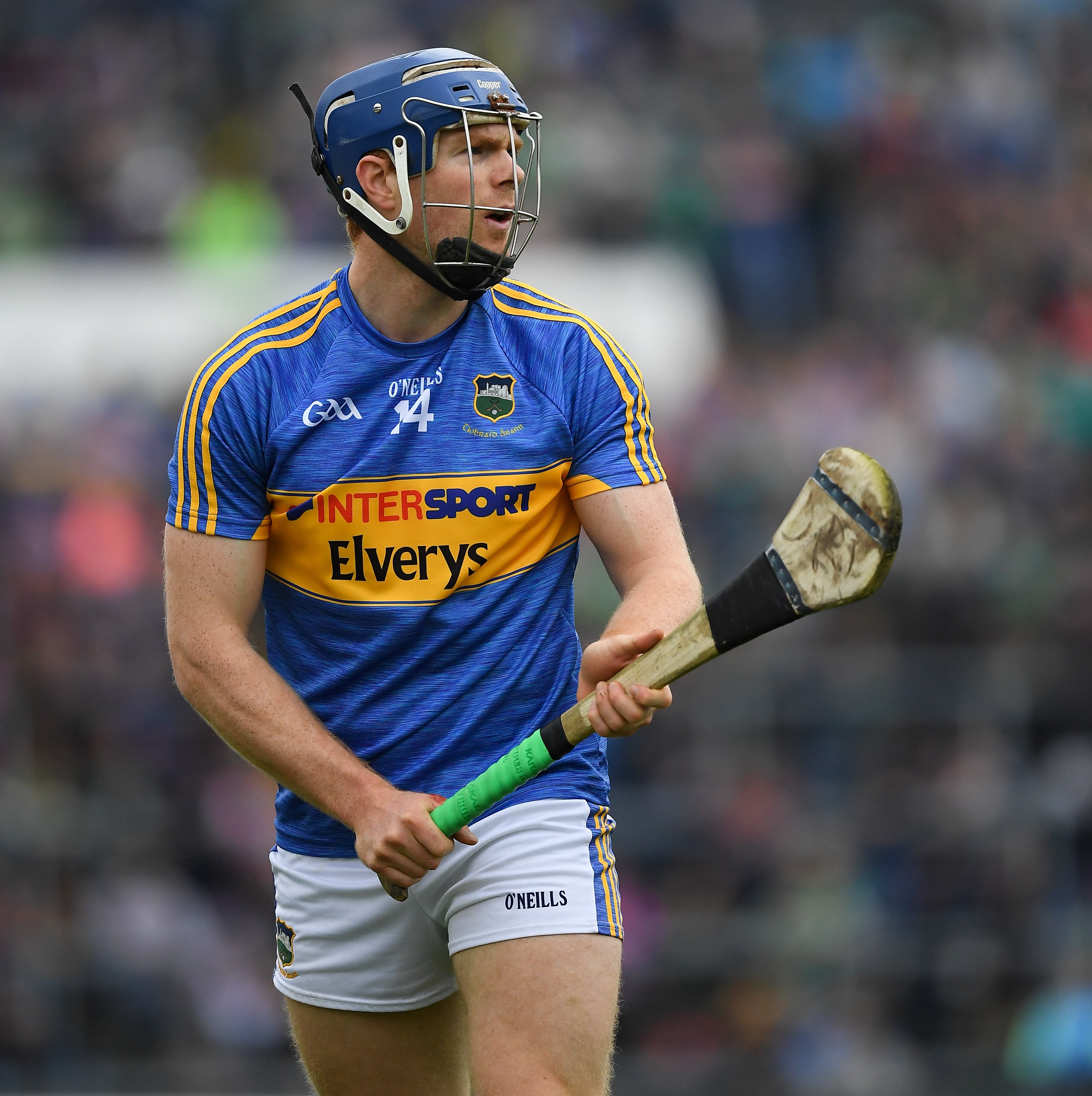
Jason Forde taking a fre

- David Forde (soccer) (born 1979), Irish football player
- Eugenie Forde (1879–1940), American silent film actress
- Evan Forde (born 1952), American oceanographer
- Florrie Forde (1876–1940), Australian singer and entertainer
- Frank Forde (1890–1983), Australian Prime Minister
- Gerhard Forde (1927–2005), American Lutheran Theologian
- Jason Forde, Irish hurler who plays for Tipperary senior hurling team
- Jewel Forde, Barbadian television presenter
- Leneen Forde, Canadian-born solicitor, University chancellor and Governor of Queensland, Australia
- Liam Forde (1891–1958), alias of Séamas Ó Maoiléoin (aka James Malone), Irish revolutionary spy

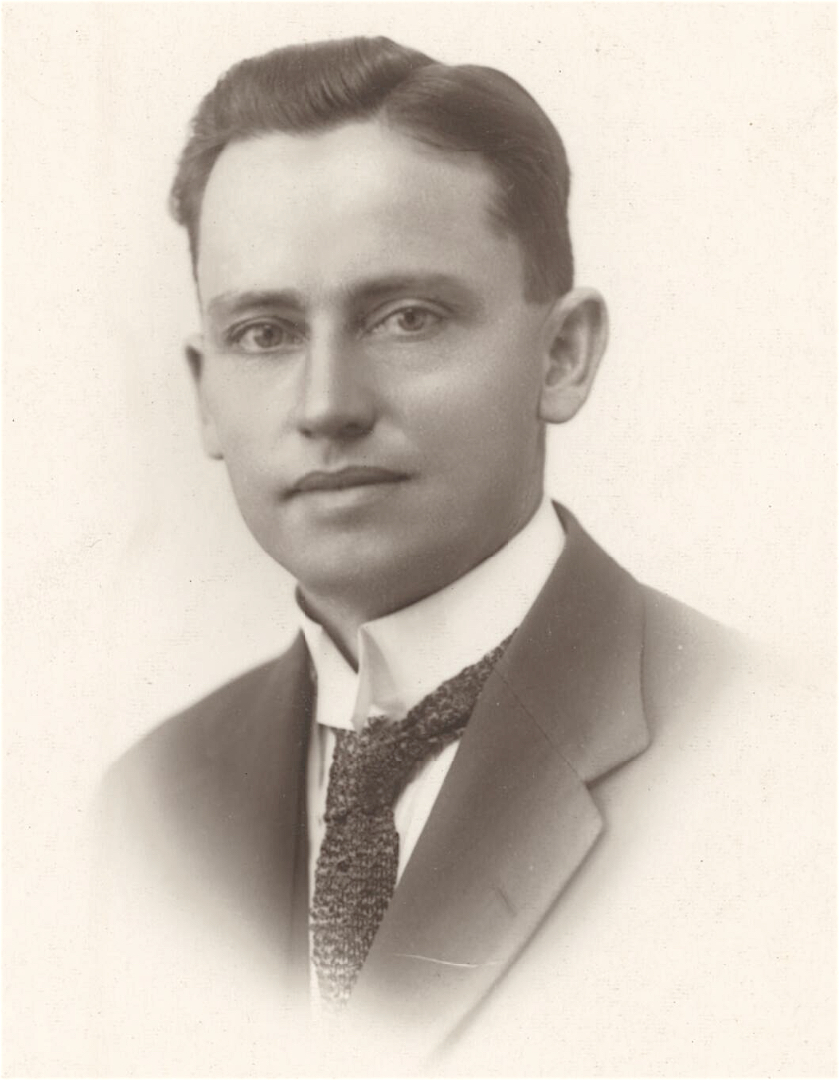
Frank Forde as a young man

- Martin Forde (1923–2022), American labour union activist
- Mattie Forde, Irish Gaelic footballer
- Matthew Forde, Barbadian and West Indies cricket player
- Nadia Forde, Irish model, singer and actress
- Norman Forde (born 1977), Barbadian footballer
- Pat Forde (born c. 1965), American sportswriter
- Patricia Forde (born 1960), Irish arts administrator and children's author
- Robert Forde (1875–1959), Antarctic explorer and member of the Terra Nova Expedition under Captain Robert Falcon Scott
- Samuel Forde (1805–1828), Irish painter
- Shaq Forde (born 2004), English footballer
- Shawna Forde (born 1967), American anti-illegal immigration activist charged with murder in 2009
- Sheri Forde, Canadian sports reporter
- Tommy Forde (1931–2012) Northern Irish footballer
- Victoria Forde (1896–1964), American silent film actress
- Walter Forde (1898–1984), British actor, screenwriter and director
