= Ryan Ford =

Ryan Ford may refer to:

- Ryan Ford (fighter) (born 1982), Canadian professional boxer
- Ryan Ford (footballer) (born 1978), English footballer
- Ryan Ford (runner) (born 1998, American long-distance runner
