= John Ford (footballer, born 1932) =

Australian rules footballer (born 1932)

Personal information
- Full name: John C. Ford
- Born: 18 April 1932 (age 94)
- Original team: Ararat
- Height: 185 cm (6 ft 1 in)
- Weight: 86 kg (190 lb)

Playing career^{1}
Years	Club	Games (Goals)
1955–56	North Melbourne	13 (2)
- ^{1} Playing statistics correct to the end of 1956.

John C. Ford (born 18 April 1932) is a former Australian rules footballer who played with North Melbourne in the Victorian Football League (VFL).
