= Foggbrook =

Coordinates: 53.39°N 2.12°W

- Location within Greater Manchester
- Metropolitan borough: Stockport
- Metropolitan county: Greater Manchester
- Region: North West
- Country: England
- Sovereign state: United Kingdom
- Police: Greater Manchester
- Fire: Greater Manchester
- Ambulance: North West

Foggbrook is an area of Offerton in Stockport, England.
