= John J. Ford Jr. =

American numismatist (1924-2005)

John Jay Ford Jr.
- Born: March 5, 1924
- Died: July 7, 2005 (aged 81)

John Jay Ford Jr. (March 5, 1924 – July 7, 2005) was an American numismatist from Hollywood, California, known for his extensive collection of historical currency and medals. Ford largely collected American coinage, particularly U.S. colonial coins, medals, and obsolete U.S. and colonial currency. Ford was one of the premier experts in the field of numismatics, and it is estimated that the total value of his numismatic holdings was upwards of $55 million at the time of his death.

== Early life ==
Ford was born in the city of Hollywood, California in 1924. Ford's father was a scientist and unsuccessful inventor who "lost all of his money in business failures" before taking his family to Queens, New York.

Ford showed an interest in numismatics from a young age and began to actively collect coins in 1935 at the age of 10 or 11. One of the first pieces of his collection was a Confederate bill which he bought for 15 cents, which would go on to fetch $200 in auction when he sold it years later. He began working at Stack's Coin Shop in New York City in 1939, cataloging stamps for the store. Although he did not take on a full-time job at Stack's until 1942, Ford's career as a collector and trader began in 1941 when he began conducting auctions in his own name (8 such auctions took place from 1941 to 1950).

After building a name for himself through small numismatic dealings, Ford was drafted into the United States Army and served as an army cryptographer during the Second World War. His numismatic career resumed when he returned, but not before he briefly worked in other industries.

== Career ==
In 1951, Ford began his association with the New Netherlands Coin Company, a partnership that lasted for twenty years (1951–1971). Not only was Ford part owner of this company, but much of his long-lasting notoriety among numismatists originated from the catalogs that he put together while working with New Netherlands. Throughout the 1950s and 1960s, a time when coin-collecting was becoming more widely popular in a booming post-WWII economy, Ford became a highly influential figure within the field. His meticulous descriptions of the grades, colors, and other qualities of coins through New Netherlands catalogs enabled greater confidence and interest in auction bidding on coins as well as helped spread of numismatic scholarship in the United States.

Ford was also a founding member of the Numismatic Bibliomania Society, an organization created in 1980 at the American Numismatic Association convention held in Cincinnati, Ohio. The Society was founded to stimulate interest in numismatic scholarship and enable greater cooperation between coin enthusiasts and researchers alike. Ford's speech at the inaugural meeting for the Society was later published in one of the first editions of The Asylum, the Society's quarterly numismatic publication."

== Western gold bar controversy ==
Ford was later associated with a major controversy over vintage gold bars that entered the numismatic market from the 1950s onward. Numismatist Theodore Vern Buttrey Jr. alleged that Ford played a central role in marketing, promoting, or supplying provenance narratives for many of the disputed pieces, which were presented as nineteenth-century ingots connected with private assayers, United States Assay Office, or shipwreck recoveries. While defenders argued that the absence of earlier documentation did not by itself prove falsity and that some Western gold or unparted bars had documented pre-1950 histories. No formal adjudication conclusively resolved the dispute, but further numismatic reassessments increasingly treated many of the disputed bars as modern fabrications rather than genuine nineteenth-century ingots.

== Collections ==
Ford's collections include a wide variety of different coins and medals from throughout United States history, dating back to the colonial era.

U.S. colonial era medals, coins, and currency were among Ford's collections. He also was noted for collecting Indian peace medals, pioneer and territorial gold, and a number of obsolete currencies from both American colonies and federal notes prior to 1861. Possibly the most notable items in his collection were Massachusetts notes issued in 1690, considered the oldest currency issued by an American colony.

Along with the rare coins and medals for which he was best known, Ford's collections included "the badges slaves wore when they were rented out for day work, Civil War revolvers and an ashtray owned by Hitler."

== Impact ==
In an article from the New York Times after Ford's death, Q. David Bowers, a well-respected numismatist who has practiced since 1957, is quoted as having said that Ford was "one of the 'most influential figures in American numismatics.'" Ford at times courted controversy, as he reversed the numismatic industry's practice of overpricing coins which went up for auction, even underrating coins to draw more awareness and interest.

Along with his large collections and impact on the numismatic community, Ford was known for having mentored Walter Breen during his time at New Netherlands. While working together, Breen and Ford wrote catalogs for Netherlands that would become quite famous. Breen, who would gain notoriety both for his work as a writer and also for the criminal record that he accumulated throughout his life, was later heralded as the "genius of numismatics" and would go on to write the most comprehensive guide to American numismatics, Walter Breen's Complete Encyclopedia of U.S. and Colonial Coins.

== Personal life and death ==
John J. Ford had a wife, Joan, and three daughters; Susan, Leslie, and Kimberly. Ford died on July 7, 2005, in Phoenix, Arizona, at the age of 81. The first set of Ford's coin holdings were sold in 2003, with the majority of his collections put up for auction after his death.
