= Coin storage =

Methods of storing coin collections

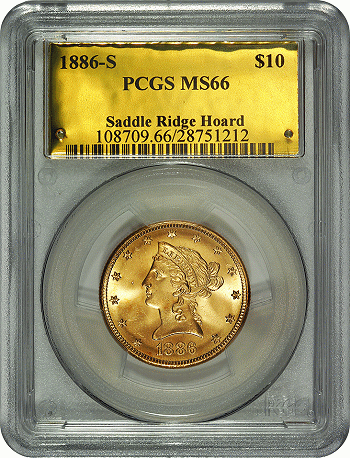
An 1886-S Gold eagle in a PCGS plastic coin slab

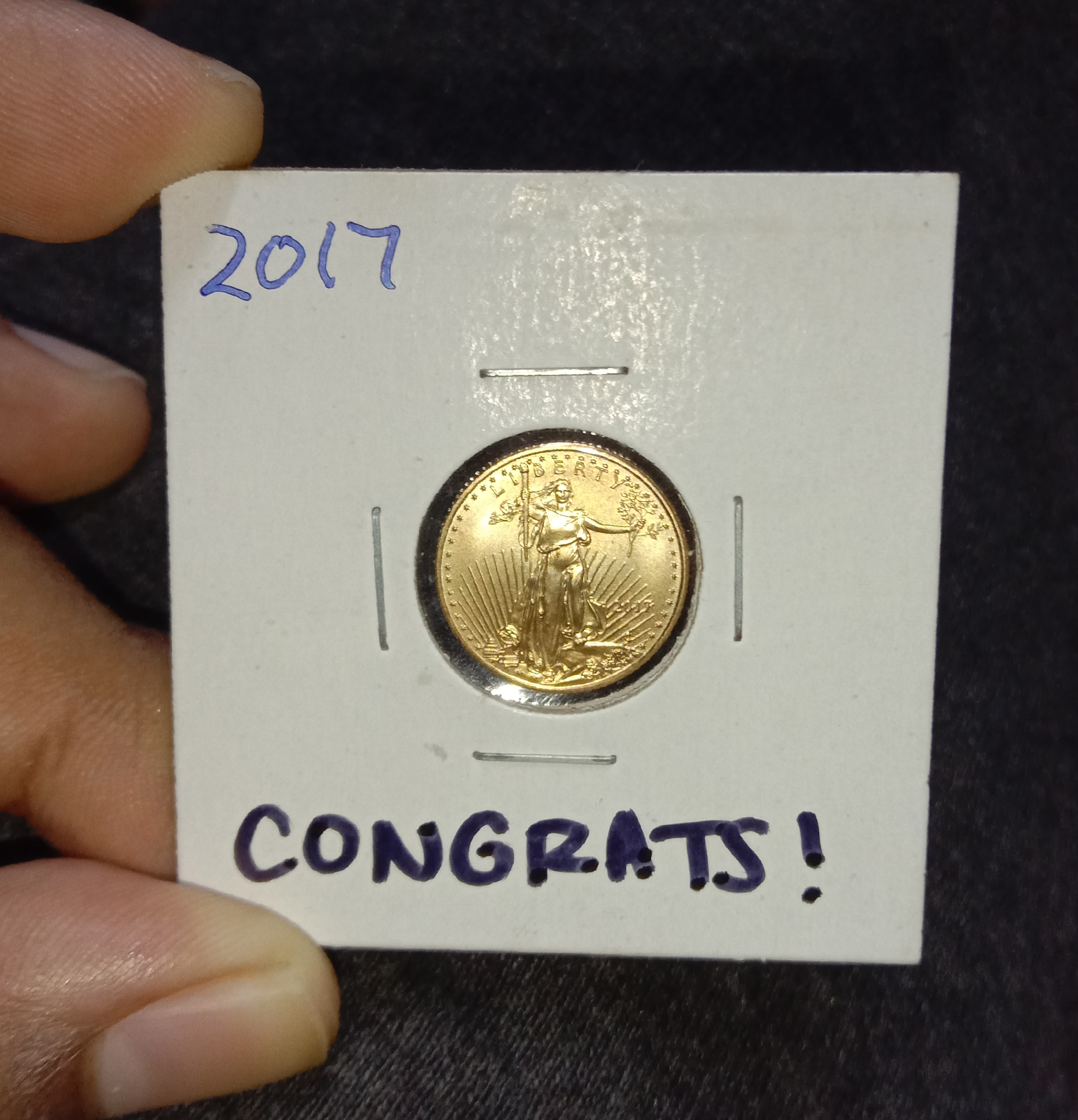
A 1/10th troy ounce American Gold Eagle in a cardboard '2x2' flip, secured with staples

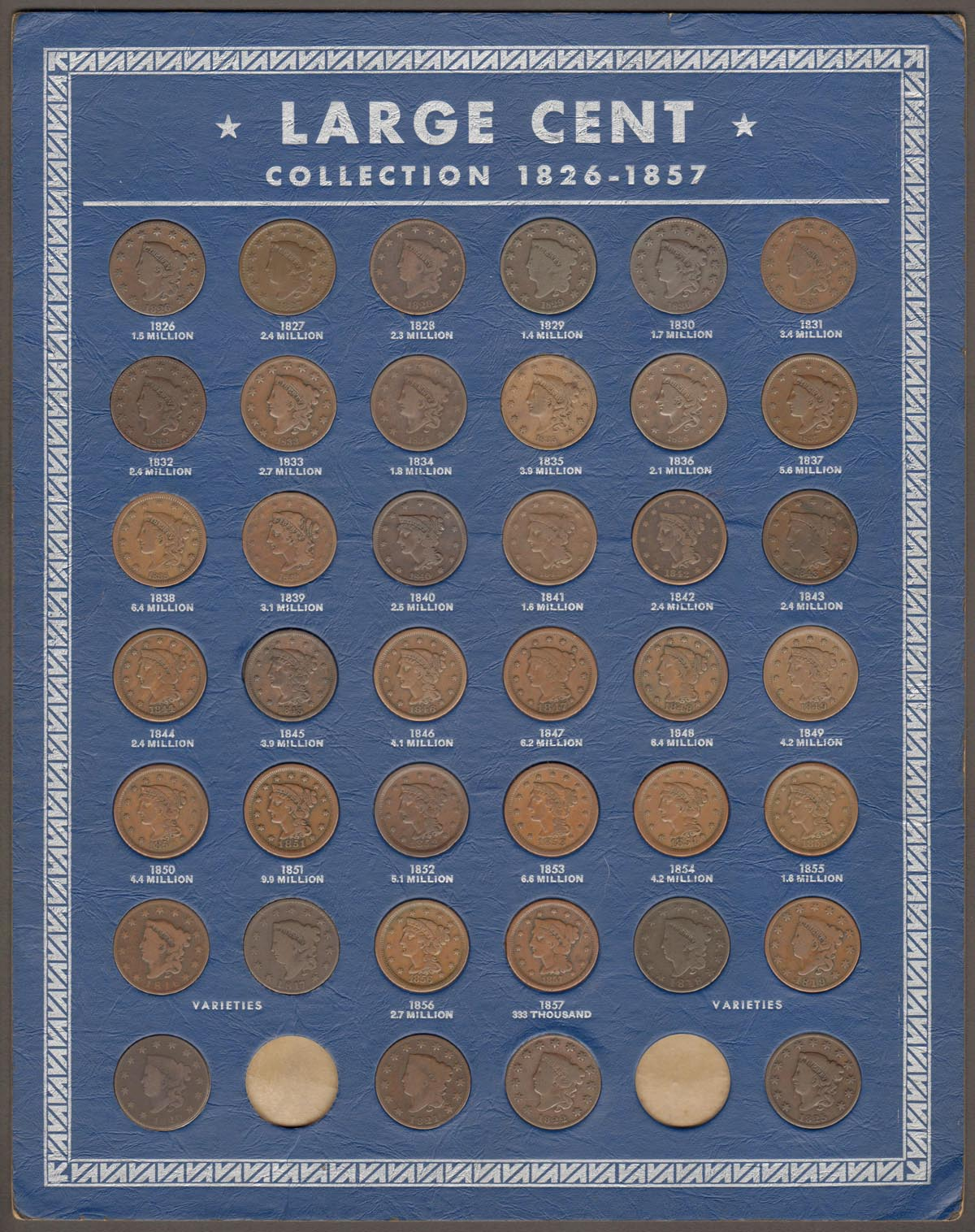
A coin folder offers little protection from the elements (although depending on the brand it is usually chemicaly inert) and can damage coins when pressed in or popped out.

Coin collectors have various options for storing their coin collections. The various options depend on a few different requirements such as; protection from oxidation and other chemical damage, protection from mechanical damage, ease of viewing and organization, and protection from loss or theft.

For these requirements, a few more common options include; plastic flips, cardboard flips, coin folders (press-in type), coin tubes, coin albums (these have plastic slides that slide out allowing the coin to ber removed or inserted), and for higher value individual coins, coin slabs(Usually NGC,PCGS, CAC and ANACS). The collection can then be placed in specialty designed coin storage boxes. Common storage boxes are available for 2x2 coin flips and various brands of coin slabs.

To prevent theft coin collectors use safes and bank safety deposit boxes. Each type of storage solves some of the challenges of safely storing a coin collection, but few completely solve all of them alone and thus, many collectors use multiple layers of protection to improve the safety of their coins. The more valuable the coin the more elaborate the storage solutions and sizable the collection.

While it may seem counter-intuitive, some (cheap off brand) storage methods can damage coins. Soft PVC and standard cardboard contain chemicals that can degrade into acids as well as other acidic or oxidizing materials abd residue. For expensive coins that can be tarnished, collectors should avoid using cardboard folders, paper or plastic bags, certain plastic tubes, and any other storage container that is not chemically inert.

Some of the recommended storage solutions include coin slabs (the gold standard if from a reputable third party grader like NGC), Coin albums (a good option for less expensive coins the aren't worth the gradeing fees as well as organising date and year sets), chemecally inert PVC free coin flips (good for storing individual coins that you are not building a set of) and hard chemically inert coin capsules (these are usually not a favorite because they are expensive and size specific).
