= Ford Cup (tennis) =

Defunct tennis tournament
- Event name: Ford Cup (1985)
- Tour: WTA Tour (1985)
- Founded: 1985
- Abolished: 1985
- Surface: Clay (1985)

The Ford Cup is a defunct WTA Tour-affiliated tennis tournament played in 1985. It was held at the Frenchman's Creek Beach & Country Club in Palm Beach Gardens, Florida in the United States and played on outdoor clay courts.

== Results ==
=== Singles ===
Year	Champion	Runner-up	Score
1985	(United States) Chris Evert-Lloyd	(Czechoslovakia) Hana Mandlíková	6–3, 6–3
