= Tortoiseshell (disambiguation) =

Tortoiseshell is a material produced from the shells of species of tortoise and turtle, mainly the hawksbill sea turtle.

Tortoiseshell or tortoise shell may also refer to:

- Turtle shell, the shell of a turtle or tortoise
- Tortoiseshell cat, a cat coat coloring
- Tortoiseshell butterflies, brush-footed butterflies (Nymphalidae) in the genera Aglais and
  - Nymphalis
- "Tortoiseshell", a song by The Boo Radleys which appeared on their EP Every Heaven

== See also ==
- Small tortoiseshell, a colourful Eurasian butterfly in the family Nymphalidae
- Tortoise (disambiguation)
- Turtle (disambiguation)
- Shell (disambiguation)
