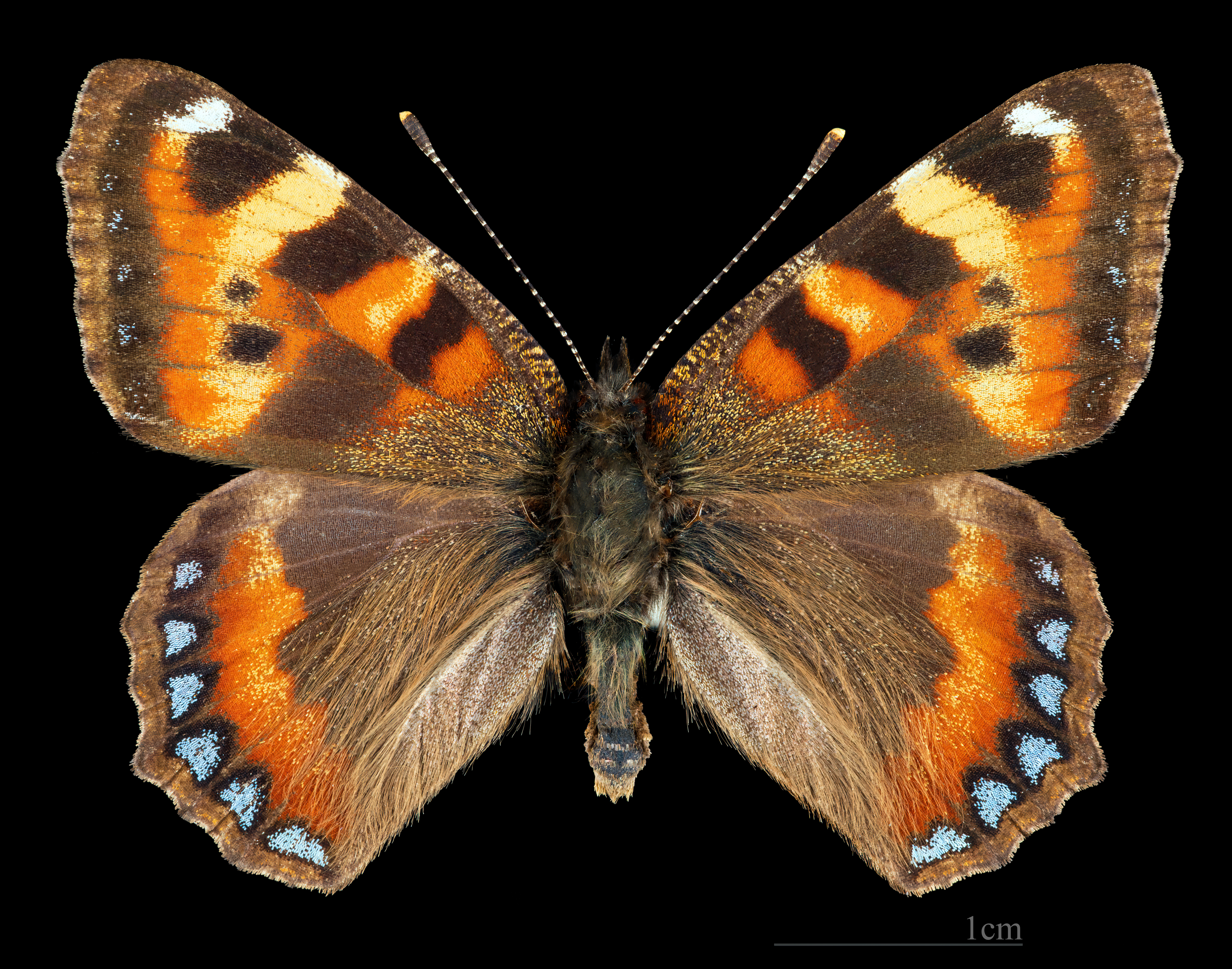
- Aglais ladakensis Upperside MHNT
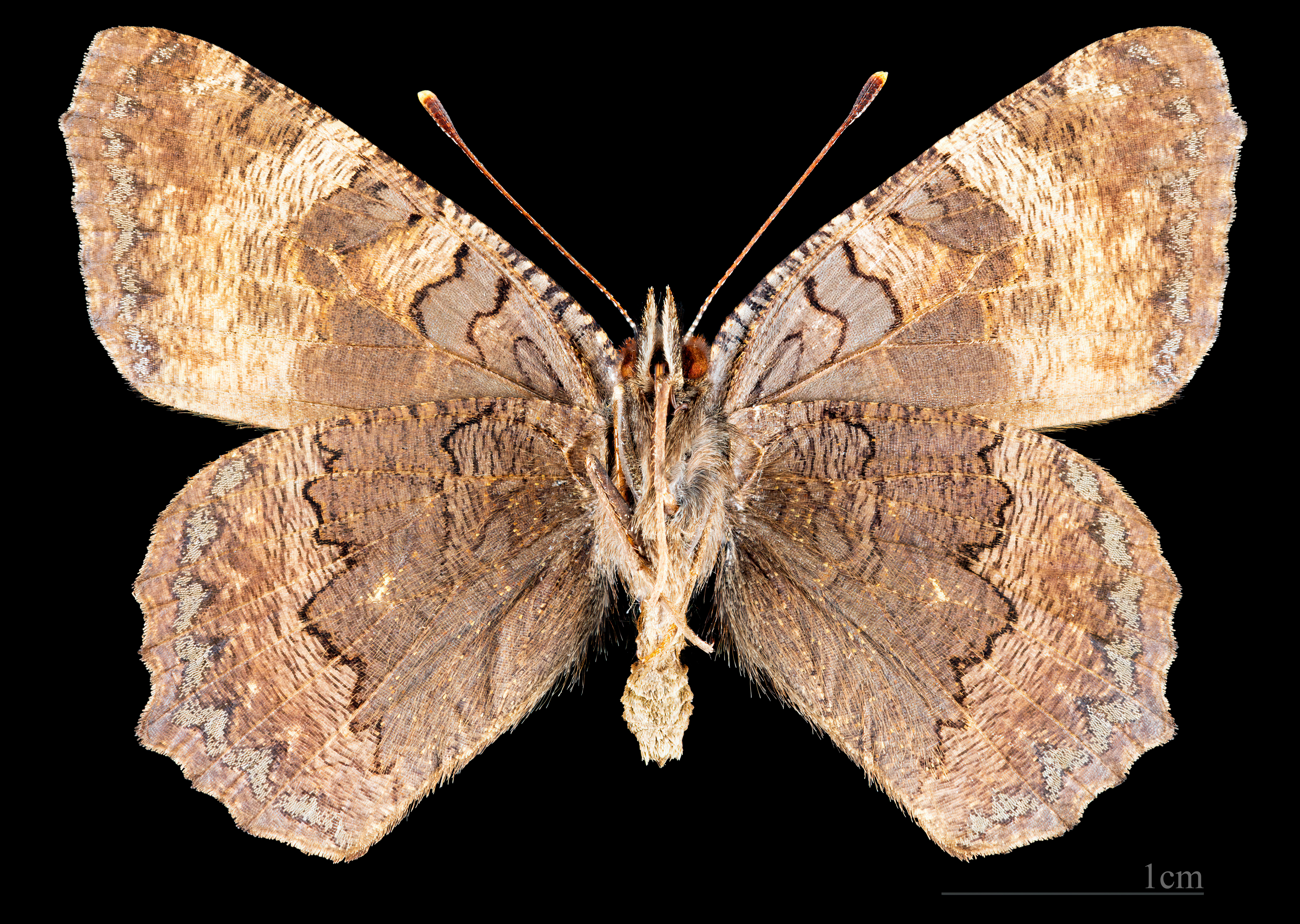
- Aglais ladakensis Underside MHNT

Scientific classification
- Kingdom: Animalia
- Phylum: Arthropoda
- Class: Insecta
- Order: Lepidoptera
- Family: Nymphalidae
- Genus: Aglais
- Species: A. ladakensis

Binomial name
- Aglais ladakensis (Moore, 1878)

Synonyms
- Vanessa ladakensis (Moore, 1878); Nymphalis ladakensis

= Aglais ladakensis =

Ladakh tortoiseshell

Species of butterfly

Aglais ladakensis (Ladakh tortoiseshell) is a species of nymphalid butterfly found in Asia.

== Description ==
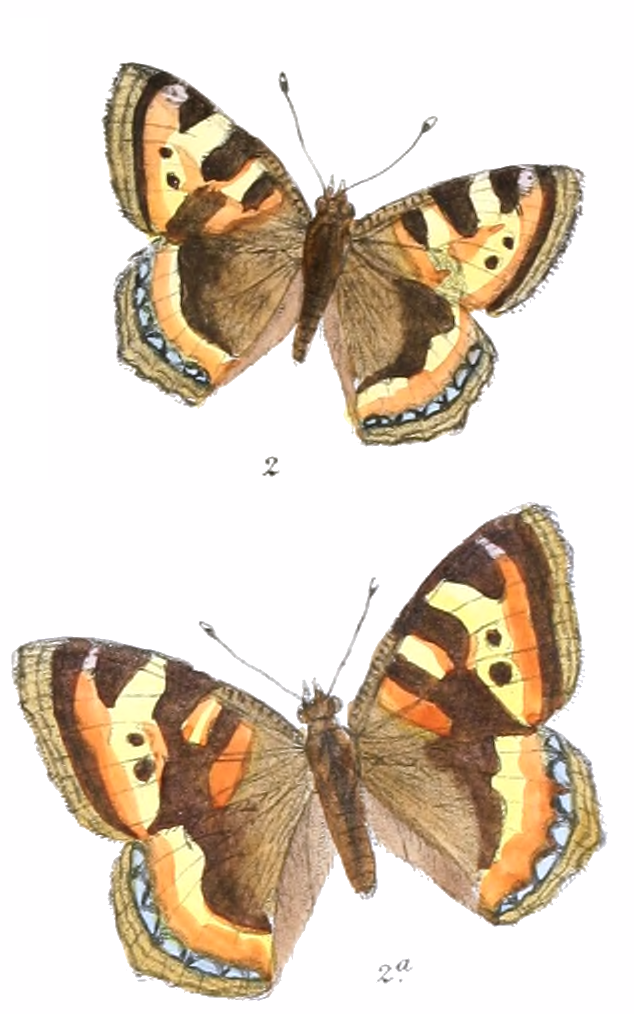
Male and female

Differs from Aglais caschmirensis with the forewing termen convex and not falcate and not produced between veins 5 and 6. Upperside colours and markings similar to and disposed as in Aglais rizana but the lower blackish discal spot or patch in forewing much broader, extended to the median vein joining the transverse band across the cell, joined also by a triangular patch at base of interspace 3 to the short band beyond the discocellulars; two small rounded spots in interspaces 2 and 3 respectively placed on a yellow band, as in N. rizana. Hindwing with the sub-terminal series of conical black spots larger, each centered with a large spot of blue.

Underside much paler than in either Aglais caschmirensis not so thickly studded with dark transverse short striae. Forewing: the cell with an ochraceous subbasal and a whitish median transverse broad band; beyond apex of cell a curved, broad, whitish, irregular, postdiscal band from costa to dorsum, and a short oblique preapical whitish mark.

Hindwing basal two-thirds dusky brown, outwardly margined by a sinuous jet-black line; both forewings and hindwings with the transverse series of triangular dark marks of the upperside showing through.

Antennae, head, thorax and abdomen as in Aglais caschmirensis.

Wingspan of 46–53 mm.

== Distribution ==
Northern Himalayan ranges, Ladakh, Tibet, Chitral; Nilang Pass beyond Mussoorie; Sikkim, Chumbi valley.
