= Testudo =

Testudo (which meant "tortoise" in classical Latin) may refer to:

- Battering ram, an armored siege engine with metal plating on the top to protect from missiles fired from above
- Chevrolet Testudo, a concept car designed and built by Bertone on a Chevrolet Corvair unibody chassis
- Steel Testudo or the Nationalist-Socialist Party of Romania, 1930s political party
- Testudo (mascot), the mascot of University of Maryland, College Park
- Testudo (genus), a genus in the tortoise family of turtles
- Testudo formation, a Roman military tactic which involved a formation of soldiers using their shields to form a tortoise-shell-like protective cover against enemy weapons
- Testudo, the Latin variant of the Greek chelys harp, involving a sound-box made from a tortoise shell
- Testudo, an obsolete constellation now in the constellation of Pisces

== See also ==
- Tortoise (disambiguation)
- tetsudō (鉄道) - Japanese word for “railway”
