= Turtle (disambiguation) =

A turtle is a reptile, most of whose body is shielded by a special bony or cartilaginous shell.

Turtle(s) may also refer to:

== Bird ==
- European turtle dove (archaic name: turtle)

== Computing ==
- Turtle (robot), a class of educational robots used most prominently in the 1970s and 1980s
- Turtle (syntax), a Terse RDF Triple language
- Turtle F2F, a tool for exchanging content in an anonymous and secure way over a friend-to-friend (F2F) network
- Turtle graphics, using a relative cursor, the "turtle"
- Turtles, small values near the end of the list in sorting; See Comb sort

== Entertainment ==
=== Fictional characters ===
- Turtle (comics), in DC Comics, two antagonists of The Flash
- Turtle (Entourage), a character in the HBO television series
- Turtle, a character in Barbara Kingsolver's novels, The Bean Trees and Pigs in Heaven

=== Gaming ===
- Turtle (game term), a defensive gaming strategy
- Turtles (video game), a 1981 arcade game by Konami
- Turtle Entertainment, a German esports organiser

=== Music ===
- The Turtles, an American folk-rock band, known for their 1967 song "Happy Together"
- Turtles (South Korean band), a K-Hip-Hop band
- "Turtle", a 2017 song by Twice from the album Twicetagram

=== Other media ===
- Turtle (magazine), a 1979–2014 American bi-monthly for preschoolers
- Turtle: The Incredible Journey, a 2009 German–British–Austrian documentary
- Teenage Mutant Ninja Turtles, a superhero franchise

== Places ==
- Turtle Mountain (Alberta), Canada

=== United States ===
- Turtle, Missouri, a ghost town
- Turtle, Wisconsin, a town
- Turtle Mountains (California)
- Turtle Mound, a prehistoric archaeological site in Florida
- Turtle Pond, Central Park, Manhattan, New York
- The Turtle, a former Native American center in Niagara Falls, New York
- Rio Turtle or Turtle Rock, West Virginia

== Retail brands ==
- Turtle's Records & Tapes, a defunct American retail chain
- Turtles (chocolate), a type of candy trademarked by DeMet's Candy Company

== Watercraft ==
- Turtle (submersible), the first military diving bell, built during the American Revolutionary War
- DSV Turtle, a retired ocean research submersible of the US Navy

== Other uses ==
- Turtle beans
- Botts' dots, often called turtles in Washington and Oregon
- Turtle, a member of the Ancient Order of Turtles, or Turtle Club
- Turtle, a member of NASA Astronaut Group 22
- Turtle, a type of spinning float, a breakdancing move

== People named Turtle ==
- John Turtle (1937–2024), Australian academic and endocrinologist
- Roger Turtle (fl. 1326–1344), English politician
- Tommy Turtle (1950–2020), a British Army officer from Ireland
- Turtle Bunbury (born 1972), Irish historian and author

== See also ==
- TIRTL, a traffic logger and speed measurement device
- Turtling (disambiguation)
- Chelys, an ancient Greek lyre meaning "Turtle" or "Tortoise"
