= Tortoise (disambiguation) =

A tortoise is a land-dwelling reptile, protected by a shell, of the order Testudines.

Tortoise may also refer to:

== Arts, entertainment, and media ==
- Chelys, ancient Greek lyre meaning "Tortoise" or "Turtle"
- Tortoise (band), a US post-rock band formed in 1990
  - Tortoise (album), their debut 1994 release
- Tortoise Media, a British news media platform
- Tortoises, a 1921 short volume of D. H. Lawrence poetry, all later collected in Birds, Beasts and Flowers (1923)
- Tortoise Matsumoto (born 1966), lead singer of a Japanese rock band Ulfuls

== Geometry ==
- Tortoise coordinate, the foundation of the Eddington–Finkelstein coordinates

== Warfare ==
- Land Tortoise, a military transport ship used during the French and Indian War that was intentionally sunk intact on Lake George, New York
- Tortoise formation, a defensive formation employed by Ancient Rome
- Tortoise heavy assault tank, a British heavy assault gun

== See also ==
- Hare (disambiguation), for Tortoise and Hare stories
- TortoiseBzr, a GUI integrated Bazaar client for the Microsoft Windows platform
- TortoiseCVS, a GUI integrated CVS client for the Microsoft Windows platform
- TortoiseGit, a GUI integrated Git client for the Microsoft Windows platform
- TortoiseHg, a GUI integrated Mercurial client
- TortoiseSVN, a GUI integrated Subversion client for the Microsoft Windows platform
- Tortoiseshell (disambiguation)
- Turtle (disambiguation)
