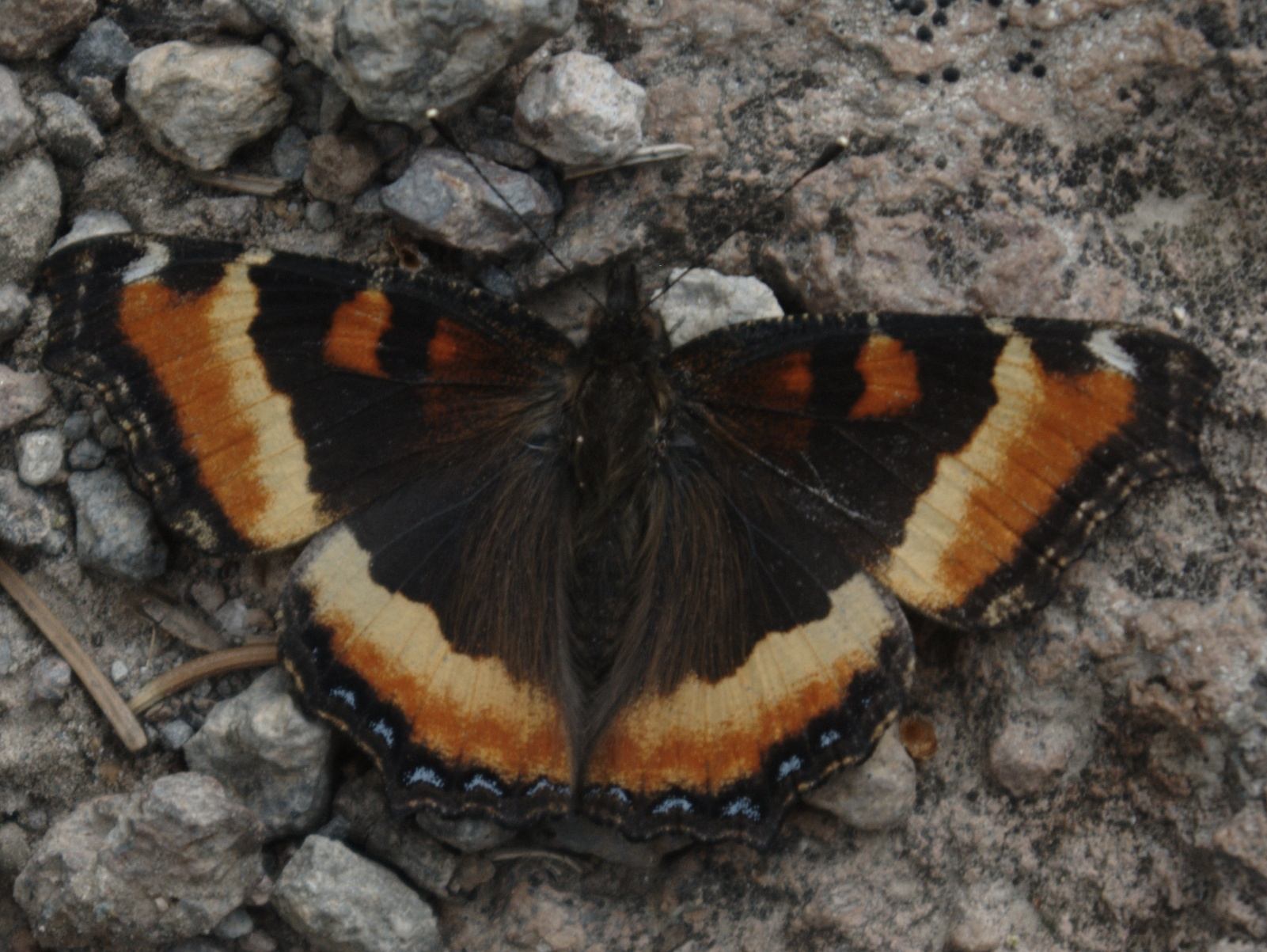

Scientific classification
- Domain: Eukaryota
- Kingdom: Animalia
- Phylum: Arthropoda
- Class: Insecta
- Order: Lepidoptera
- Family: Nymphalidae
- Genus: Aglais
- Species: A. milberti

Binomial name
- Aglais milberti (Godart, 1819)

Subspecies
- Aglais milberti milberti; Aglais milberti furcillata (Say, 1825); Aglais milberti viola (dos Passos, 1938); Aglais milberti pullum (Austin, 1998)

Synonyms
- Vanessa milberti; Nymphalis milberti

= Aglais milberti =

Species of butterfly

Aglais milberti, the fire-rim tortoiseshell or Milbert's tortoiseshell, is considered the only species of the proposed Aglais genus that occurs in North America. It is one of two tortoiseshell butterflies in North America. The other species is the nymphata californica or California Tortoiseshell (California tortoiseshell).

The data is muddled on the range of the two recognized tortoiseshell species. Similar species distributions exist and have separate migration patterns for other butterflies with the same geographical ranges.

Western monarchs, for example, migrate between southern BC, coastal CA and Pacific Mexico. Eastern monarchs can be found east of the Rockies in Canada and migrate along the Eastern American coast into interior Mexican highlands. The mountain ranges are often physical borders between distinct populations and migration. (Danaus plexippus)

== Description ==
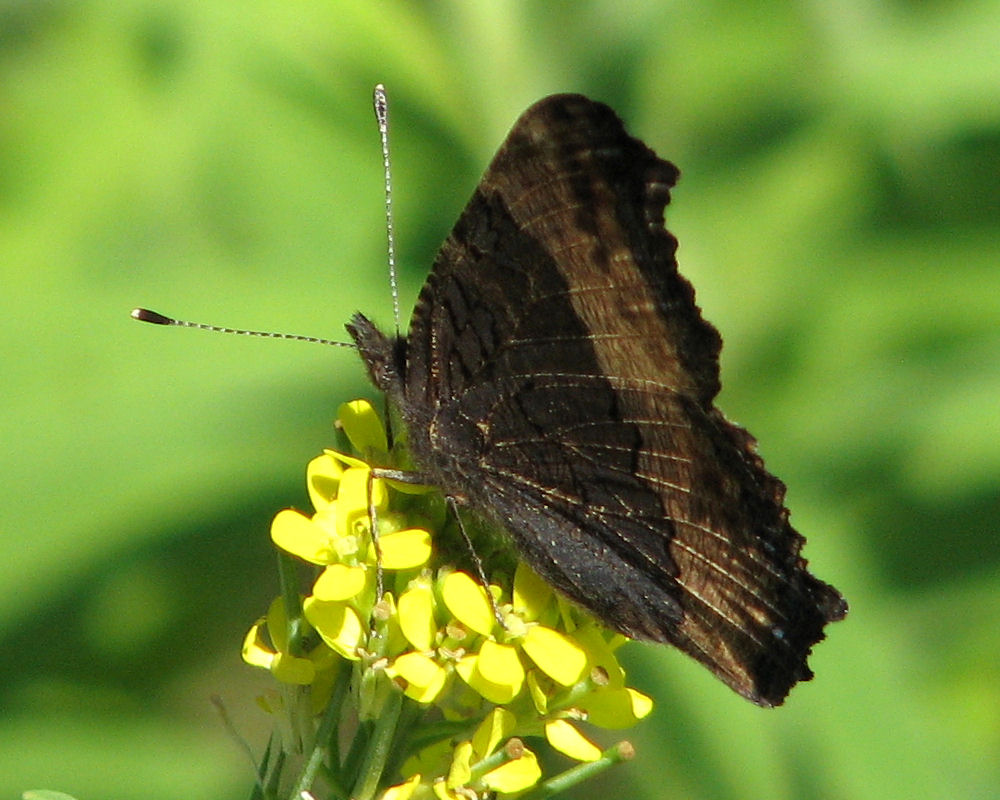
Ventral view

The wingspan is between 4.2 and 6.3 cm and the forewing's tips are squared off. The upperside is black with wide orange submarginal bands; this orange slightly fades to yellow near the inner edge. Both wings have narrow black marginal borders; the hindwing may have blue spots.

== Behaviour ==
This is a quick species that flits rapidly around woodland roads. When it lands it may open its wings, often on trees or rocks.

== Range and habitat ==
Milbert's tortoiseshell's range includes all of Canada and Alaska south of the tundra, all of the western United States and most of the eastern United States. In these areas they commonly occur in wet areas, including moist pastures, marshes, most trails, and roadsides.

== Life cycle ==
There are two broods from May to October. During this time adults mate and lay eggs. The female will lay her eggs in bunches of up to 900 individuals on the underside of the host plant's leaves. Early-instar caterpillars eat together in a web, but later instars feed alone. They hibernate as adults, often in small congregations. Adults have been known to mate in low-elevation watercourses in arid regions.

=== Larval foods ===
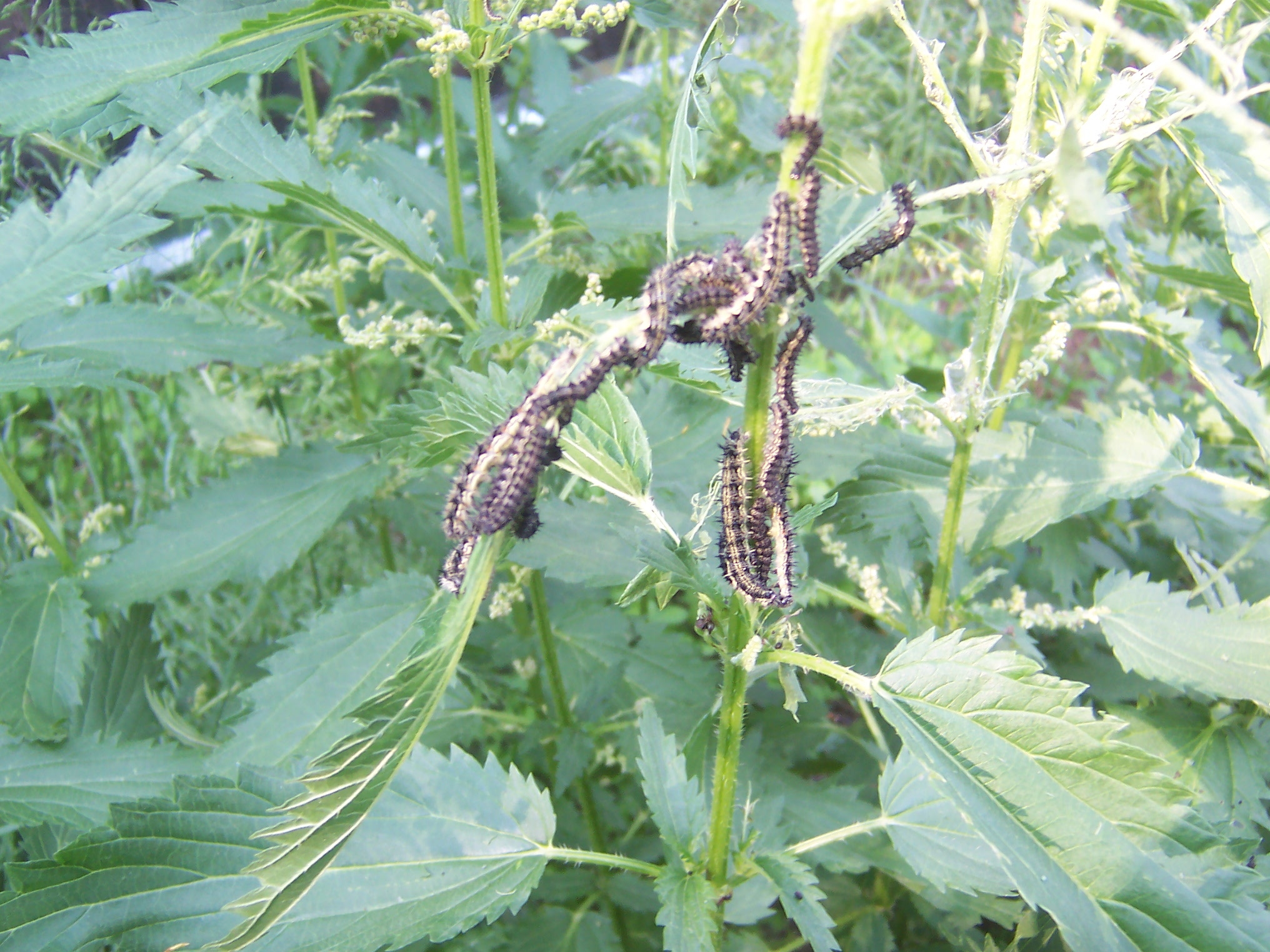
larvae feeding on stinging nettle in Crestone, Colorado

- Urtica dioica – stinging nettle
- Urtica procera – tall nettle
- Pilea pumila – clearweed

=== Adult foods ===
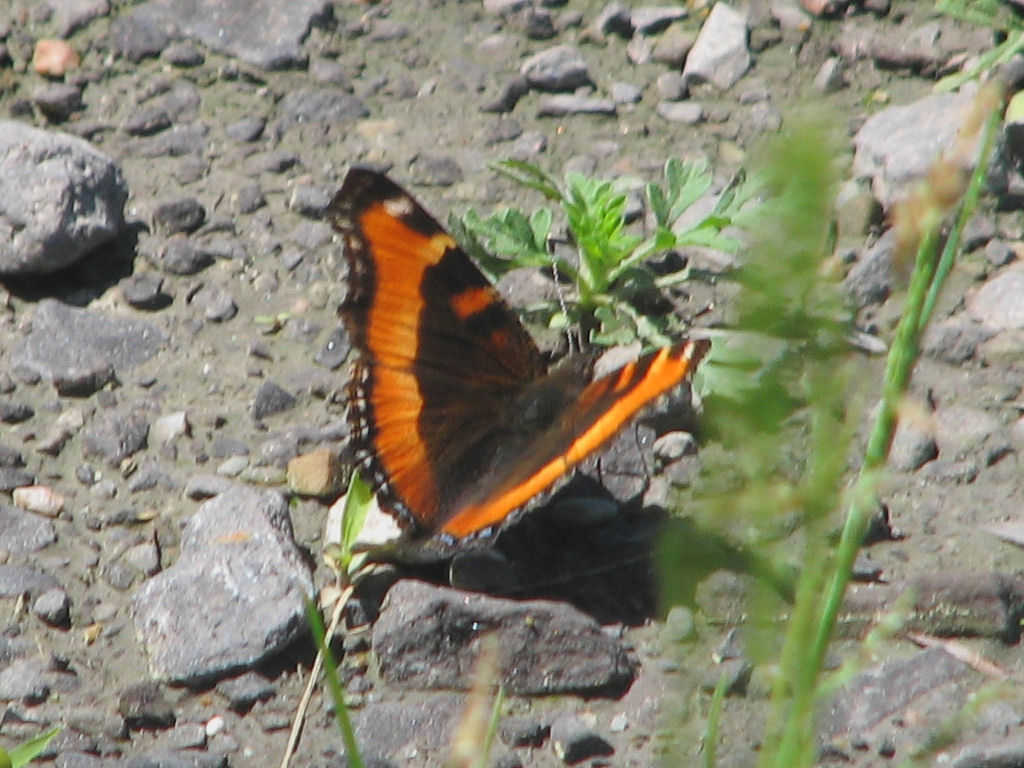
Ottawa, Ontario

- Nectar
  - Thistle
  - Goldenrod
  - Lilac
- Plant sap
- Rotting fruit
- Dung
