= Turtling =

Turtling may refer to:

- Turtling (sailing), a sailing term to describe the inverting of a dinghy
- Turtling (hunting), the hunting of turtles
- Turtling (gameplay), a game term to describe a defensive strategy
- Turtling in climbing, when a climber is flipped during a fall

== See also ==
- Turtle (disambiguation)
