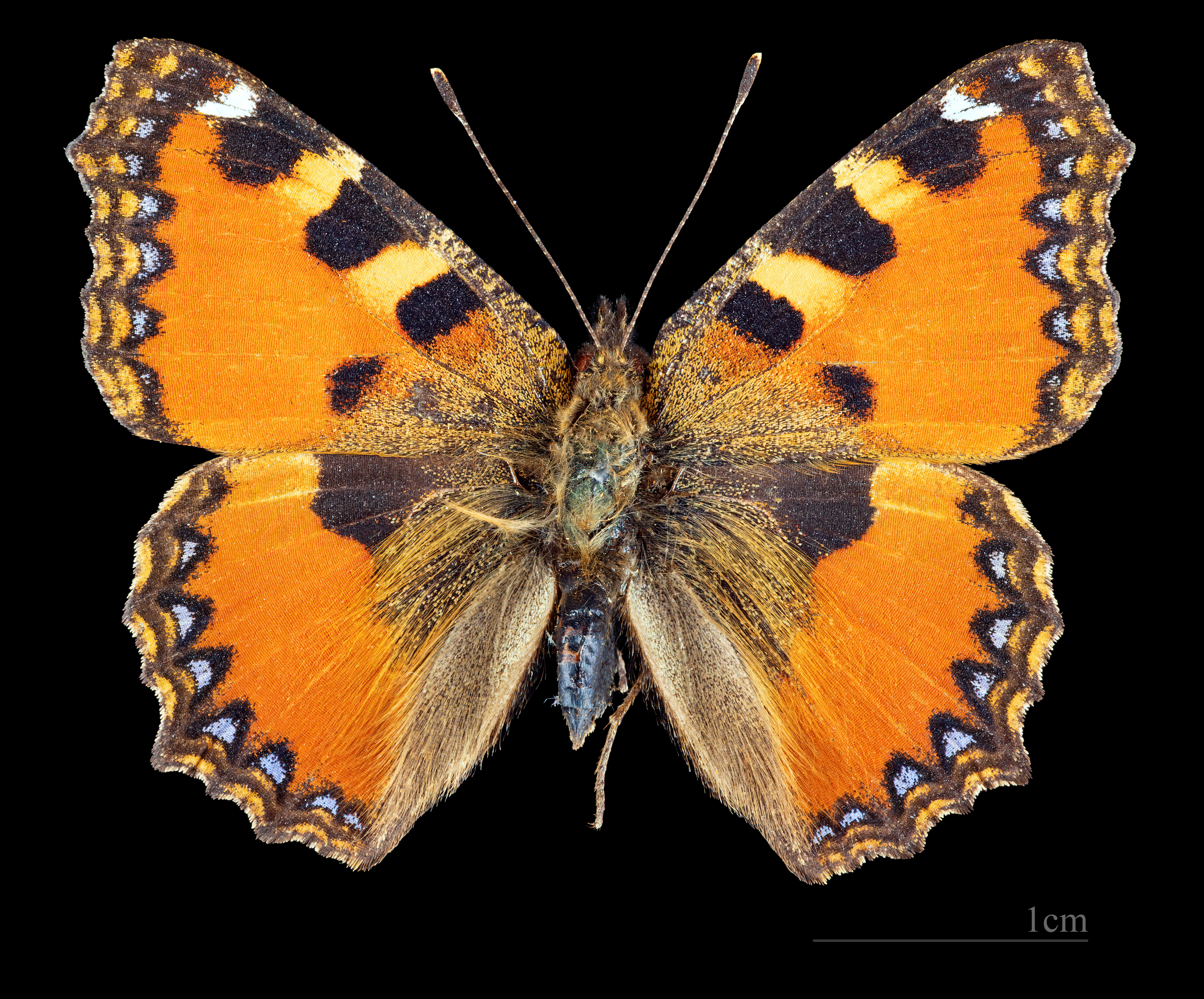
- Aglais ichnusa Upperside MHNT
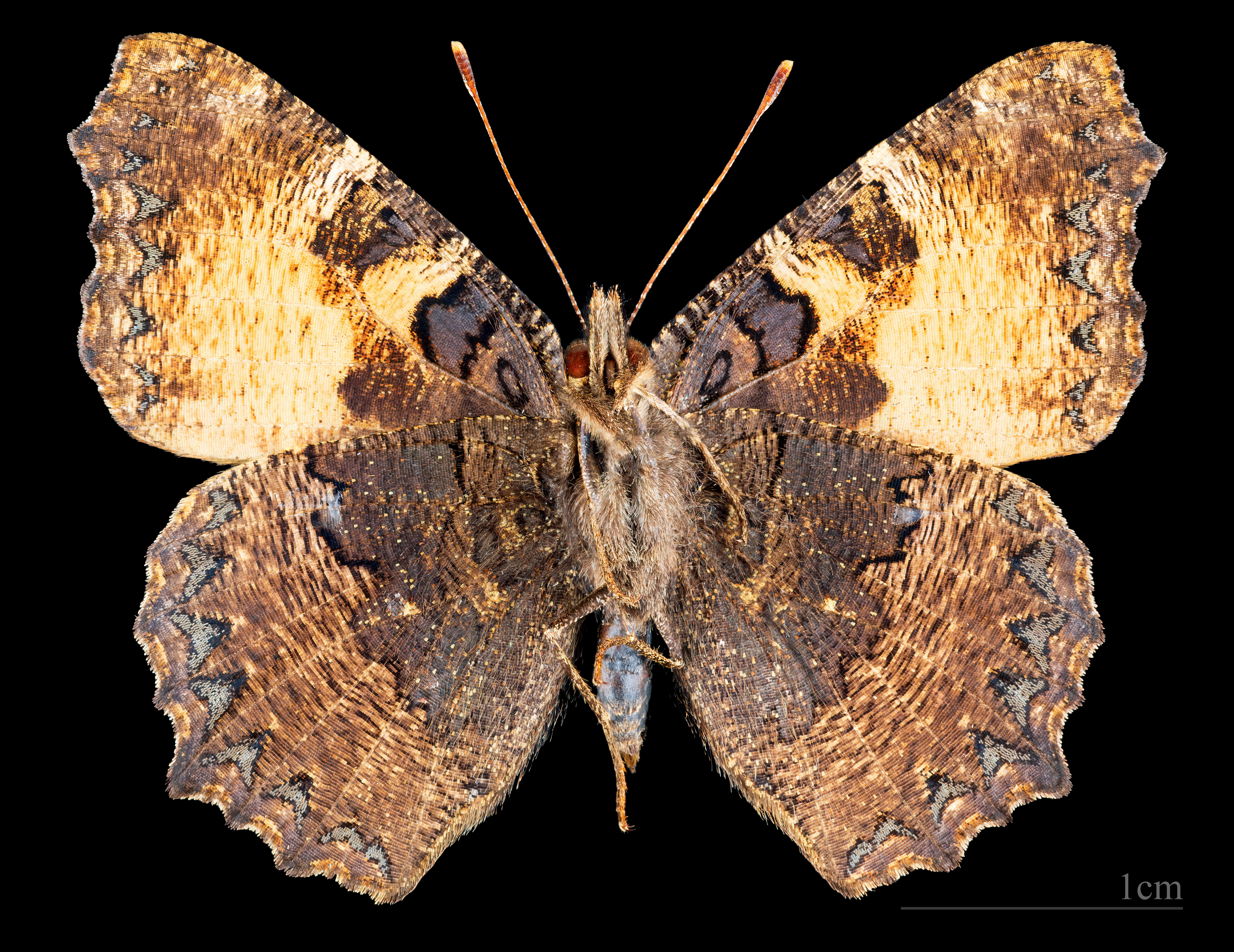
- Aglais ichnusa Underside MHNT

Scientific classification
- Domain: Eukaryota
- Kingdom: Animalia
- Phylum: Arthropoda
- Class: Insecta
- Order: Lepidoptera
- Family: Nymphalidae
- Genus: Aglais
- Species: A. ichnusa

Binomial name
- Aglais ichnusa (Bonelli, 1826)

= Aglais ichnusa =

Species of butterfly

Aglais ichnusa is a small butterfly found in the Palearctic that belongs to the browns family. It is endemic to Corsica and Sardinia.

== Description from Seitz ==
— ichnusa Bon. (62f ) is distinguished particularly by the less angulate wings, the deeper red ground-colour, and usually by the absence of the discal and hindmarginal spots of the forewing. Closely allied to the following race [turcica Stgr. now Aglais urticae turcica (Staudinger, 1871)], transitions from the nymotypical subspecies to ichnusa occur in the southern districts of the latter. Sardinia, Corsica.

== Food plants ==
Larvae of Aglais ichnusa feed on Urtica atrovirens and Urtica dioica.

== See also ==
- List of butterflies of Europe
