= Turtle, Missouri =

Extinct hamlet in Missouri, U.S.

Coordinates: 37°31′24″N 91°24′45″W

Turtle is an extinct town in Dent County, in the U.S. state of Missouri. The GNIS classifies it as a populated place.

A post office called Turtle was established in 1905, and remained in operation until 1954. The community took its name from nearby Turtle Pond, the habitat of many turtles.
