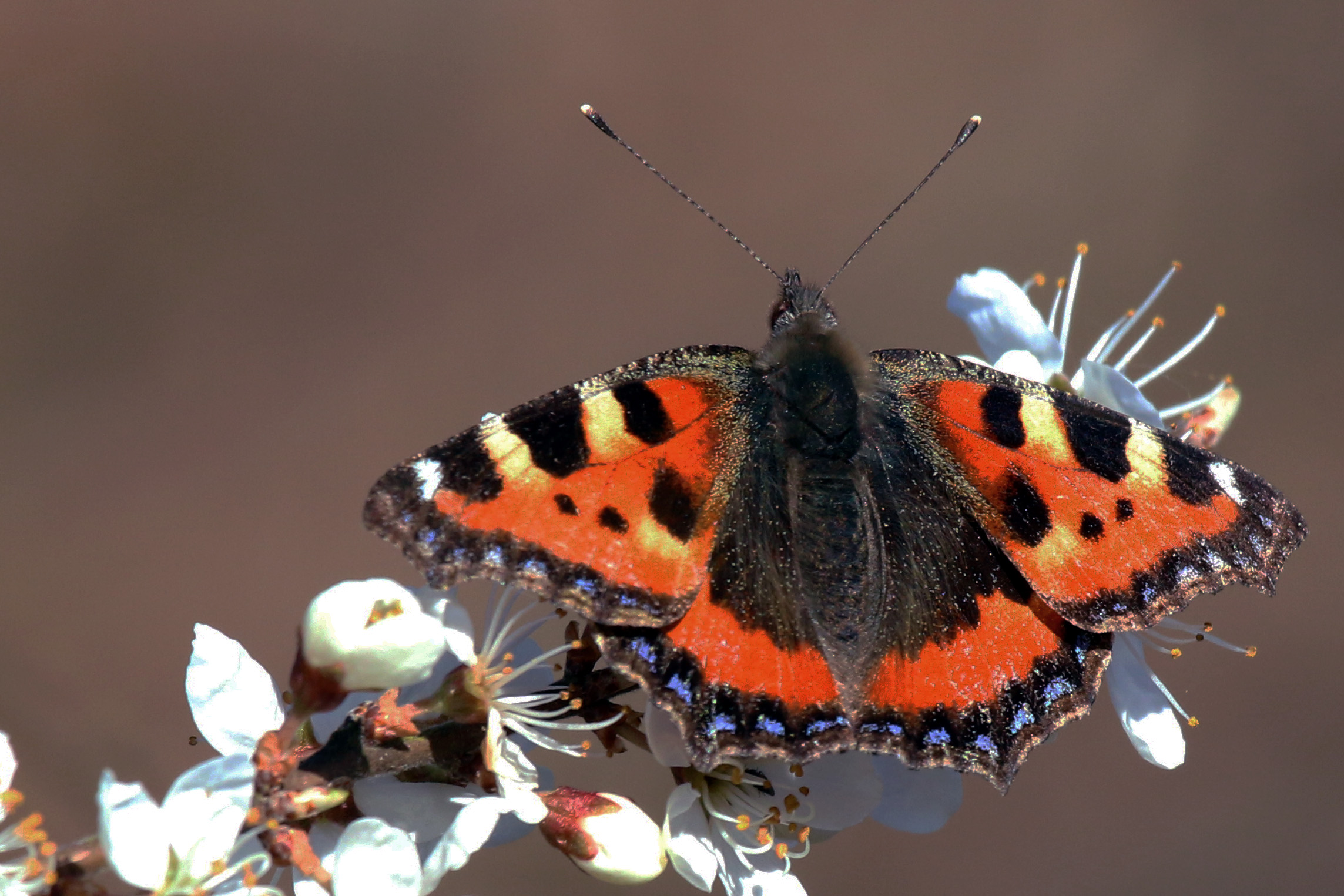
- Small tortoiseshell (Aglais urticae) on blackthorn in Otmoor, Oxfordshire, England

Scientific classification
- Kingdom: Animalia
- Phylum: Arthropoda
- Clade: Pancrustacea
- Class: Insecta
- Order: Lepidoptera
- Family: Nymphalidae
- Tribe: Nymphalini
- Genus: Aglais; Dalman, 1816

Type species
- Aglais urticae

= Aglais =

Genus of butterflies

Aglais is a Holarctic genus of brush-footed butterflies, containing the tortoiseshells. This genus is sometimes indicated as a subgenus of Nymphalis or simply being an unnecessary division from the genus Nymphalis, which also includes tortoiseshells, but it is usually considered to be separate. This proposed separate genus is also considered "brushfooted butterflies" historically together with the other or separate Nymphalis species.

== Species ==
Larvae	Butterfly	Scientific name	Common name	Distribution
		Aglais ichnusa Bonelli, 1826	Corsican small tortoiseshell	Corsica and Sardinia
		Aglais io (Linnaeus, 1758)	European peacock butterfly	Europe and temperate Asia as far east as Japan.
		Aglais caschmirensis (Kollar, 1844)	Indian tortoiseshell	The Himalayas from Kashmir to Sikkim, Gissar Range- to Darvaz, Pamirs to Alay Mountains, Afghanistan, Pakistan, West China.
		Aglais ladakensis (Moore, 1882)	Ladakh tortoiseshell	Northern Himalayan ranges, Ladakh, Tibet, Chitral; Nilang Pass beyond Mussoorie; Sikkim, Chumbi valley.
		Aglais milberti (Godart, 1819)	Milbert's tortoiseshell or fire-rim tortoiseshell	Canada and Alaska, western United States
		Aglais rizana (Moore, 1872)	mountain tortoiseshell	Pamirs to Alay Range, Afghanistan, northwest Himalayas.
		Aglais urticae (Linnaeus, 1758)	small tortoiseshell	Europe, Asia Minor, Central Asia, Siberia, China, Nepal, Sikkim, Pakistan, Northern India, Mongolia, Korea and Japan
