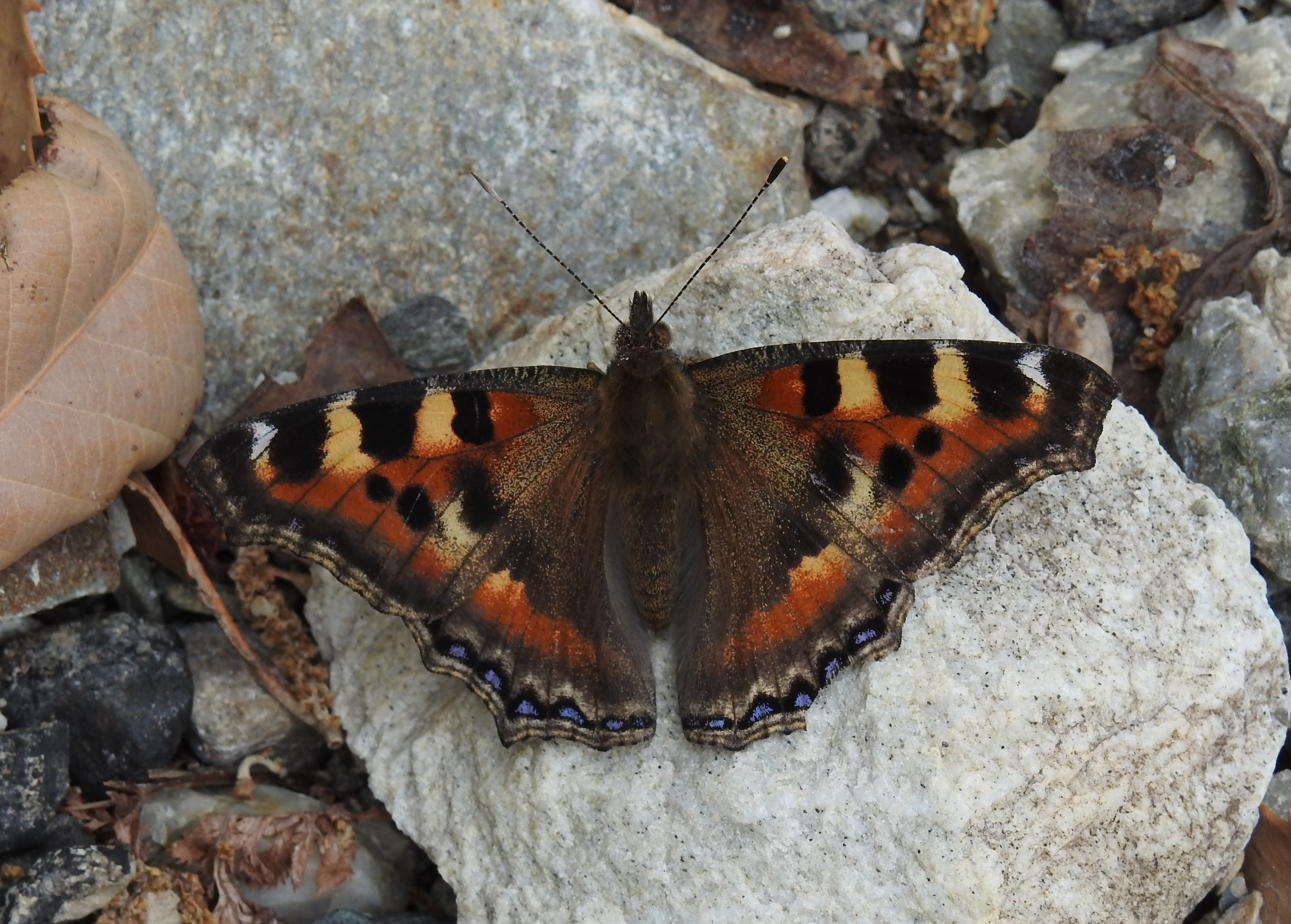

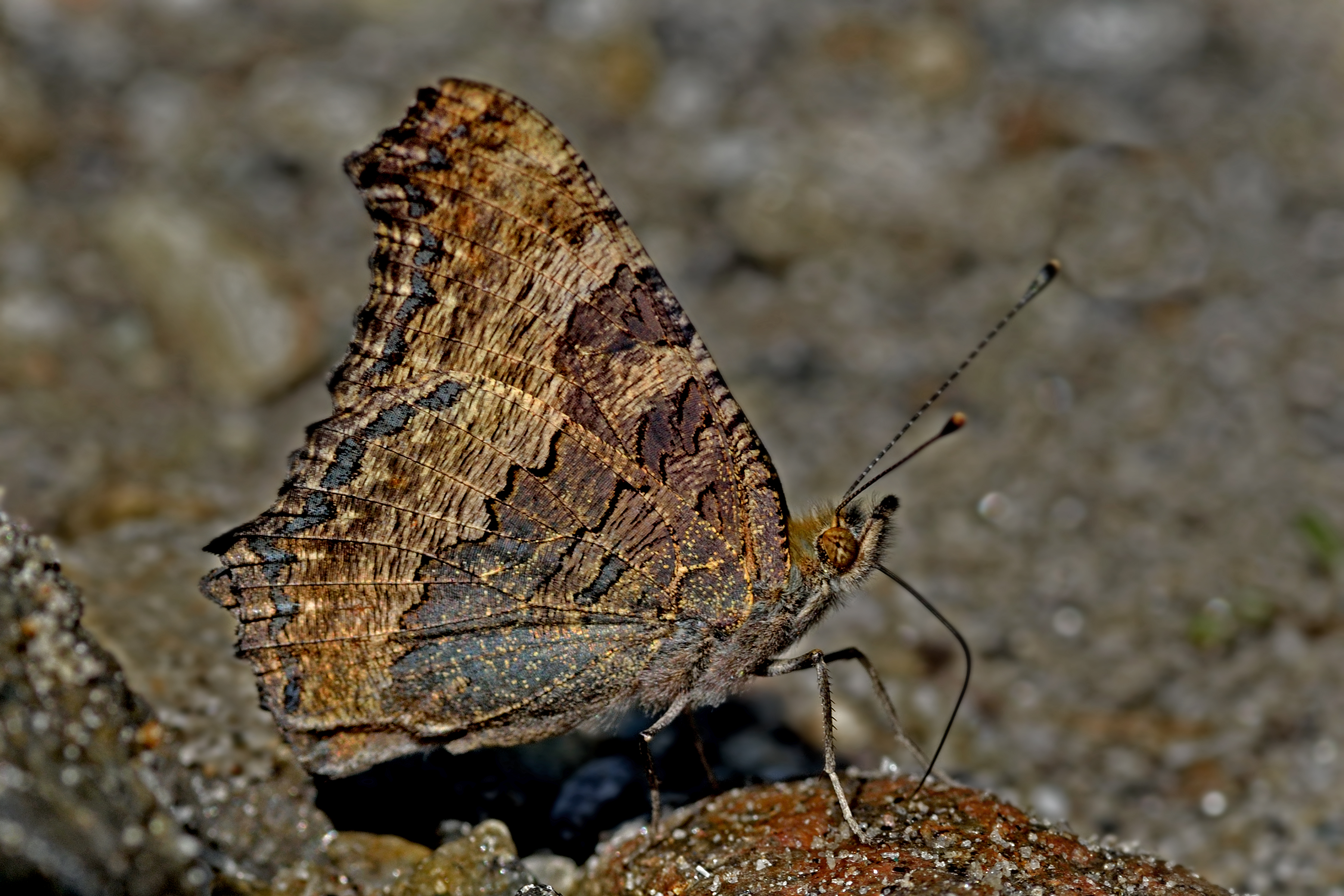

Scientific classification
- Domain: Eukaryota
- Kingdom: Animalia
- Phylum: Arthropoda
- Class: Insecta
- Order: Lepidoptera
- Family: Nymphalidae
- Genus: Aglais
- Species: A. caschmirensis

Binomial name
- Aglais caschmirensis (Kollar, 1848)

Synonyms
- Vanessa caschmirensis Kollar, 1848

= Aglais caschmirensis =

Indian tortoiseshell

Species of butterfly

Aglais caschmirensis, the Indian tortoiseshell, is a species of nymphalid butterfly found in the northern regions of the Indian subcontinent, primarily in the Himalayas.

== Subspecies ==
The subspecies of Aglais caschmirensis found in India are-

- Aglais caschmirensis aesis Fruhstorfer, 1912 – Uttarakhand to Arunachal Pradesh and Nagaland
- Aglais caschmirensis caschmirensis Kollar, 1844 – Jammu & Kashmir to Himachal Pradesh

== Description ==
Upperside of forewings with the basal half of costa and termen pale brown, the former flecked with pale yellow, the latter bordered inwardly by a narrow darker brown band bearing a series of black lunules; outwardly traversed by sinuous slender subterminal and more slender terminal black lines: base of wing and the greater part of interspace 1a and of 1 posteriorly brown, irrorated with golden scales, the rest of the wing anteriorly yellow, posteriorly and at base of cell red, with the following black markings: a broad band across the cell, another broader short band beyond, touching the discocellulars, not extending below vein 4, and a third not extending below vein 5, with a white patch beyond before apex, all three short bands rounded posteriorly; on the disc there is a large oval black spot, followed by a yellow patch in interspace 1, and above it smaller black spots in interspaces 2 and 3.

Hindwing has the basal half dusky brown, covered posteriorly with long brown hairs; anteriorly beyond the bases of veins 5, 6 and 7 black, followed by a broad red band anteriorly turning to yellow; a broad terminal brown band, traversed by a series of black-bordered blue lunules, and beyond them by very slender inner and outer black sinuous lines. Underside brown, with closely set transverse short black striae; basal half of wings clouded with dark purplish brown, the outer margin of the dark portion defined by a highly sinuous jet-black transverse line, most distinct on the hindwing, and also crossed, nearer the base of the wings, by two or three similar, much interrupted lines; terminal half of the wings paler, with two dark irregular patches below costa of forewing; finally a sinuous transverse subterminal narrow dark blue band across both forewings and hindwings, bordered on both sides by slender black lines, widening into spots on the veins of the forewing. This band is more distinct in the female than in the male. Antennae dark brown, minutely ringed with white; head, thorax and abdomen dark brown above and below.

Has a wingspan of 52–63 mm.

== Distribution ==
The Himalayas from Kashmir to Sikkim at elevations of 600 to 5,500 metres (2,000 to 18,000 ft) and as subspecies nixa (Grum-Grshimailo, 1890) Gissar Range- to Darvaz, Pamirs to Alay Mountains, Afghanistan, Pakistan, West China.
