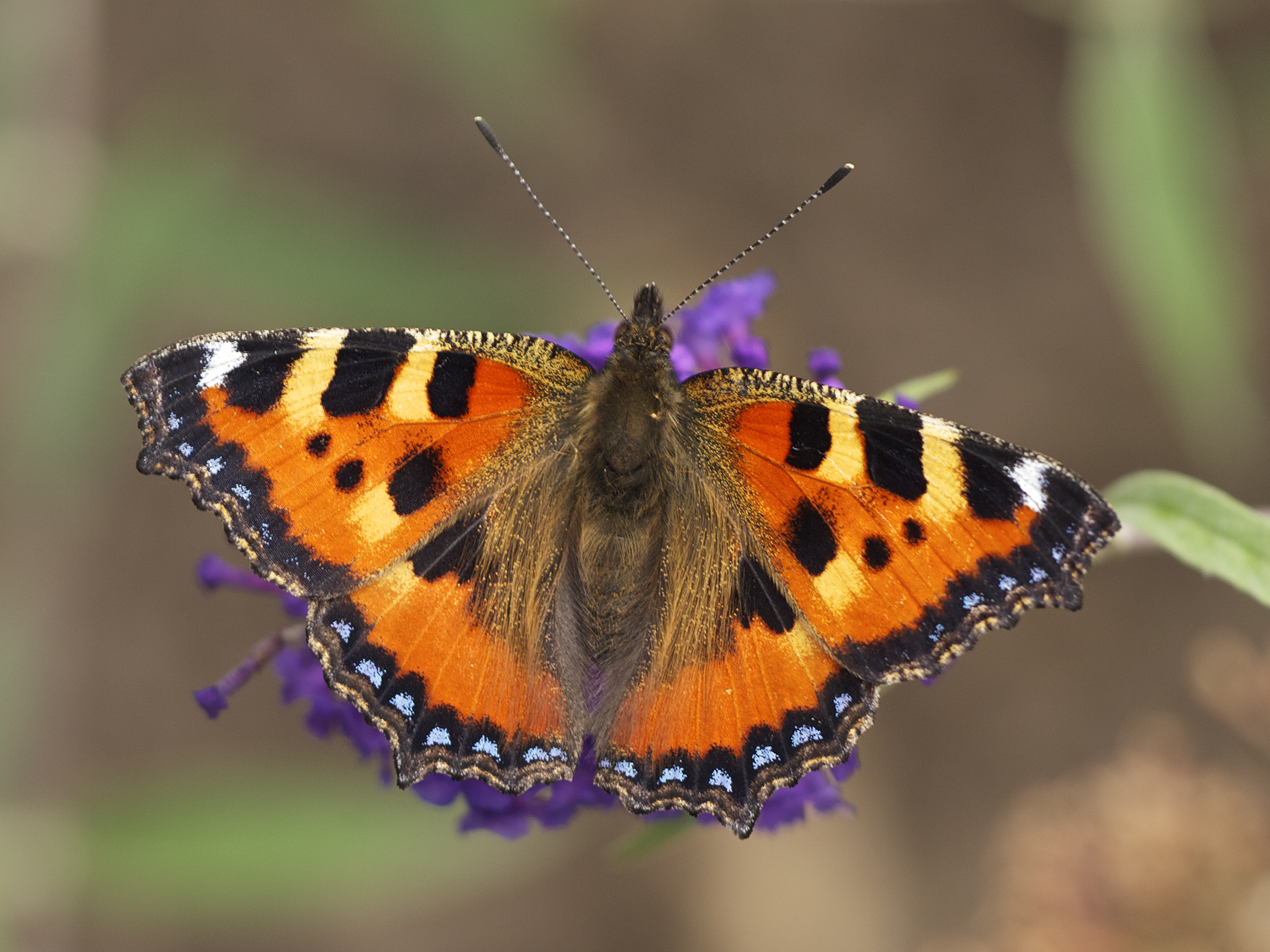

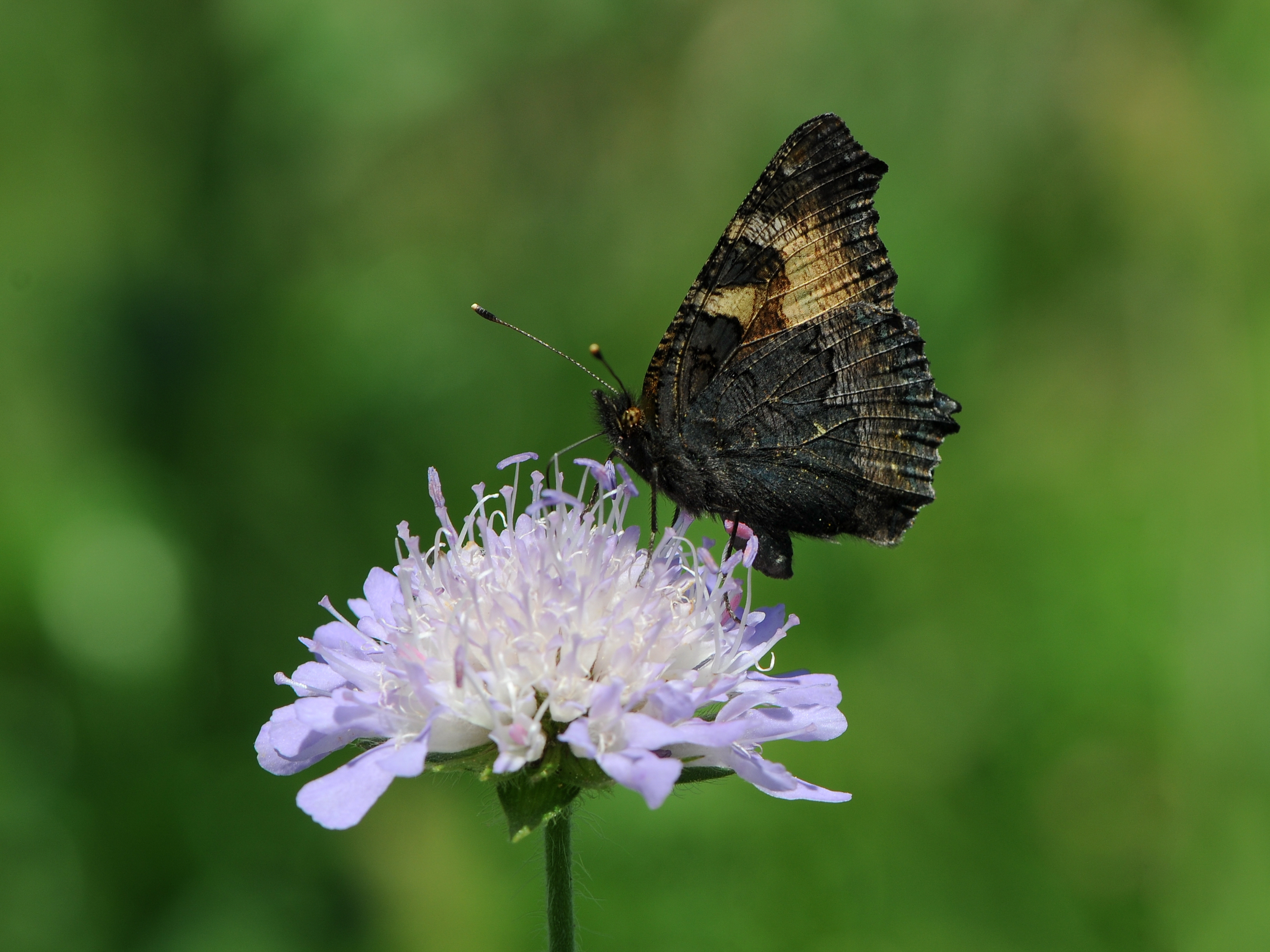

Conservation status
- Near Threatened (IUCN 3.1)

Scientific classification
- Kingdom: Animalia
- Phylum: Arthropoda
- Class: Insecta
- Order: Lepidoptera
- Family: Nymphalidae
- Genus: Aglais
- Species: A. urticae

Binomial name
- Aglais urticae (Linnaeus, 1758)
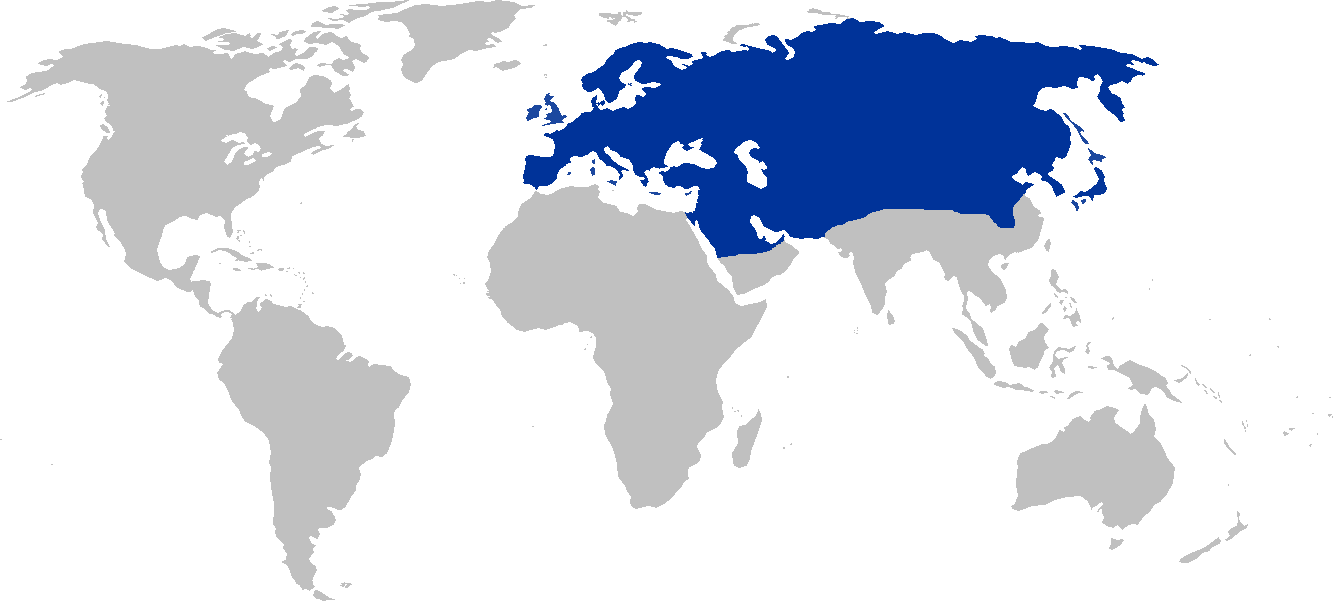

Synonyms
- Papilio urticae Linnaeus, 1758; Nymphalis urticae (Linnaeus, 1758); Vanessa urticae (Linnaeus, 1758)

= Small tortoiseshell =

Species of butterfly in the family Nymphalidae

The small tortoiseshell (Aglais urticae) is a colourful Eurasian butterfly in the family Nymphalidae. Adults feed on nectar and may hibernate over winter; in warmer climates they may have two broods in a season. While the dorsal surface of the wings is vividly marked, the ventral surface is drab, providing camouflage. Eggs are laid on the common nettle, on which the larvae feed.

== Description ==
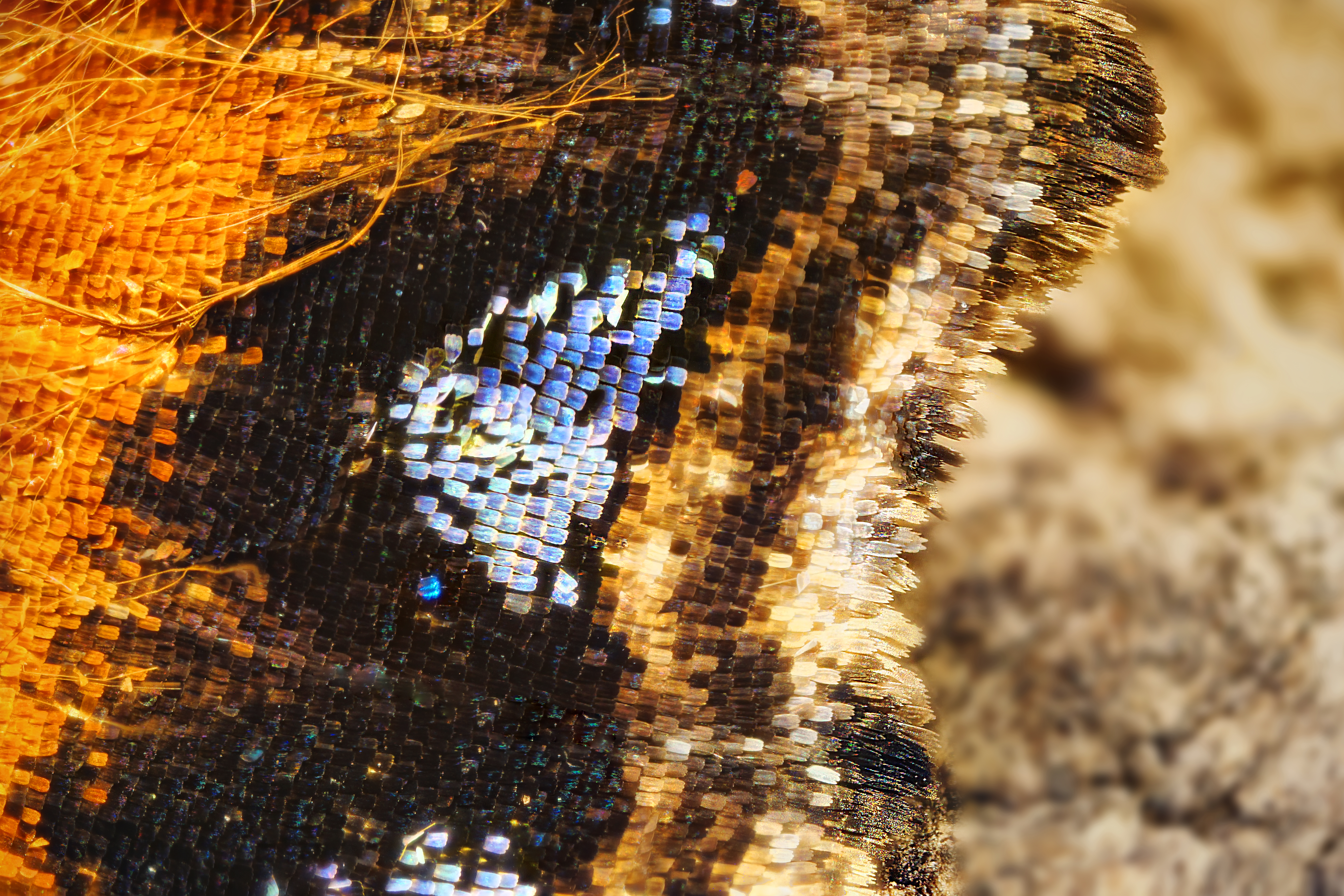
Wing scales of Aglais urticae.

It is a medium-sized butterfly that is mainly reddish orange, with black and yellow markings on the forewings as well as a ring of blue spots around the edge of the wings. It has a wingspan ranging from 4.5 to 6.2 cm.

== Technical description ==
A bright foxy red ground-colour; the forewing with 3 black costal spots, whose interspaces are yellow, there being a larger black spot in the middle of the hindmarginal area and two smaller ones in the disc between the 3 radial and 2 median; hindwing with the basal half black; both wings with black submarginal band bearing blue spots. Underside of the forewing ochreous, with the costal spots as above, the apex and distal margin blackish; hindwing brown, basal half black with dentate edge, the whole surface with darker pencilling; at the distal margin of both wings contiguous dull blue lunules.

The small tortoiseshell is the national butterfly of Denmark.

== Range ==
It is found throughout temperate Europe, Asia Minor, Central Asia, Siberia, China, Nepal, Sikkim Himalayas in India, Mongolia, Korea and Japan, wherever common nettle, which their larvae feed on, is found. There are a few records from New York City which, however, are believed to be of introduced insects.

== Subspecies ==
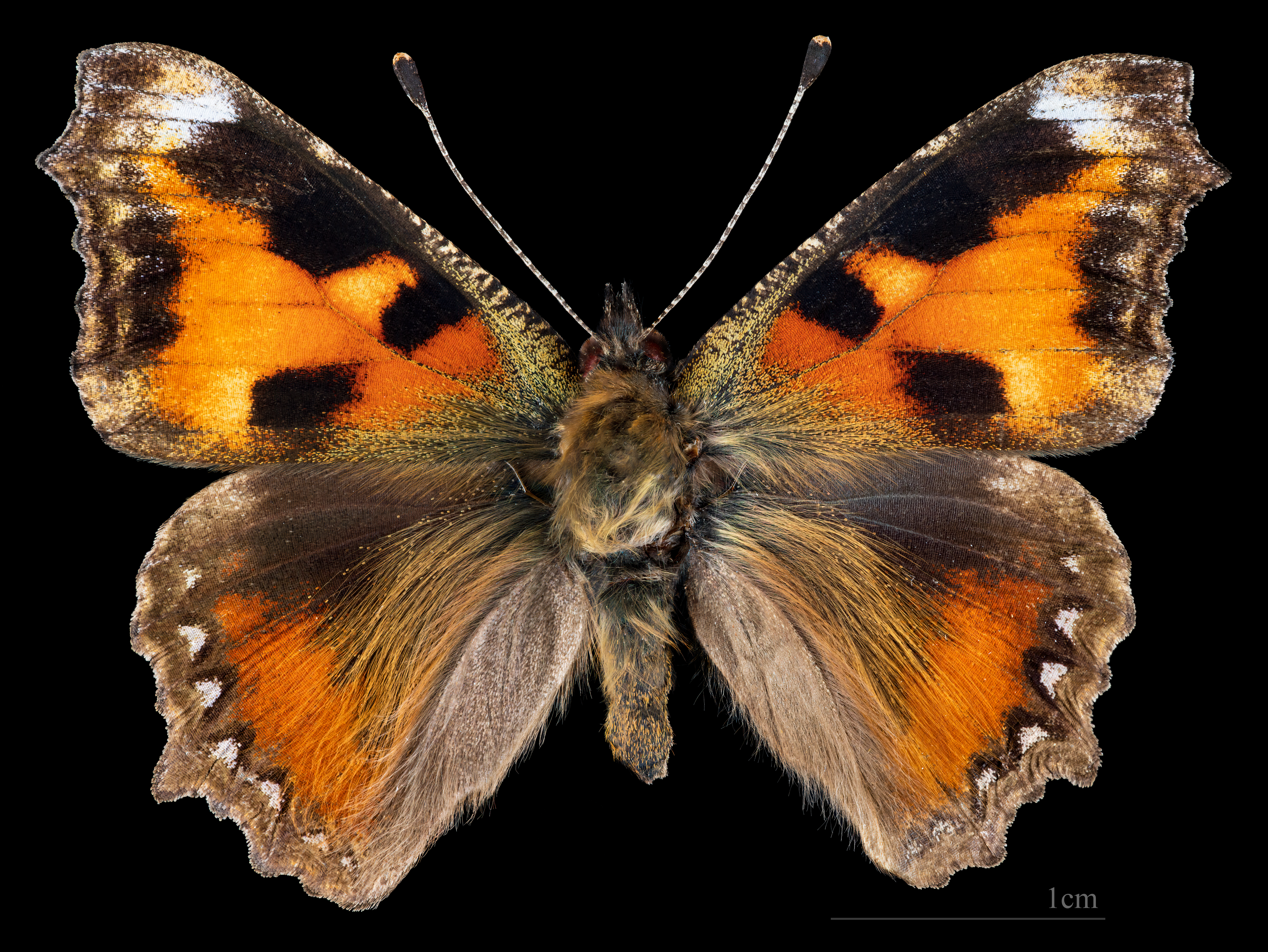
Aglais urticae, Aberration ex larva MHNT

- A. u. urticae (Linnaeus, 1758) Europe, western Siberia, Altai
- A. u. polaris (Staudinger, 1871) northern Europe, Siberia, Russian Far East
- A. u. turcica (Staudinger, 1871) southern Europe, Caucasus, Transcaucasia, Kopet Dagh, central Asia
- A. u. baicalensis (Kleinschmidt, 1929) Sayan, Transbaikalia
- A. u. eximia (Shelyuzhko, 1919) Amur, Ussuri
- A. u. stoetzneri (Kleinschmidt, 1929) Szechuan
- A. u. kansuensis (Kleinschmidt, 1940) northwest China
- A. u. chinensis (Leach, 1893) China, Japan, Korea
- A. u. connexa (Butler, 1882) southern Ussuri, southern Sakhalin, Kuriles, Japan

The Corsican small tortoiseshell (Aglais ichnusa) looks very similar; whether it is a subspecies or a distinct species is yet to be determined. Nymphalis xanthomelas and Nymphalis l-album are also similar in appearance.

== Decline in population ==
Once among the most common butterflies in Europe and temperate Asia, this butterfly is in very rapid decline, at least in Western Europe. This decline cannot be explained by the decline of its host plant, because the nettle is widespread and even enjoys the general eutrophication of the environment. The chrysalis is sometimes eaten by wasps, but these are also in strong regression. The effect of other phenomena are still poorly understood (environmental degradation, air pollution, contamination by pesticides). Scientific evidence shows that the summer drought is a cause of declining populations, because larvae grow normally on drenched leaves (but hatchlings were even rarer the wet summers of 2007 and 2008). However, before 2000, according to data from an English butterfly monitoring programme, there was a good correlation between reproductive success, the abundance of populations of this species and the host plant moisture stress. From 1976 to 1995, the butterfly had more success in summers that were cool and wet at the beginning of summer than when it was hot and dry. This butterfly may then be sensitive to global warming.

=== Droughts ===
The small tortoiseshell butterfly is severely affected by droughts. During periods of drought, the butterfly experiences a vastly reduced reproductive rate. The drought directly affects the Urtica leaves; the higher the nitrogen and water level in the leaves, the more rapid the growth of the larvae. During a drought, both of these levels drop significantly, leaving the tortoiseshell larvae nothing to feed on. The timing of rainfall is also a crucial factor. If there is not adequate rainfall in the early summer, then the plants will not be able to fully develop, leaving the larvae without a suitable source of nutrition. These butterflies actively produce smaller broods under these conditions.

== Life cycle ==
As with several nymphalid butterflies, the caterpillars feed on stinging nettles (Urtica dioica) and small nettle (Urtica urens). Humulus lupulus has also been recorded as larval food plant. Adults feed on nectar. The species has one of the longest seasons of any Eurasian butterfly, extending from early spring to late autumn. Adults overwinter in hibernation, emerging on the first warm sunny days of the year to mate and breed. In southern parts of the range there may be two broods each year, but northern insects are inhibited by long length of summer days from breeding a second time.

=== Hatching ===
Tortoiseshell butterflies usually begin to emerge from their pupa from mid-June into August. They begin hibernation sometime in October and immediately show territorial behaviour after hibernation. The tortoiseshell butterflies that are found in the north usually have one brood a season, whereas further south these butterflies can have two broods. The ability to go through three generations of butterflies in a year is due to the tortoiseshell butterflies' decreased thermal requirement. The larvae of this butterfly are social. These larvae can be found on Urtica dioica, which have a high nitrogen content and much water in the leaves.

=== Hibernation ===
The small tortoiseshell butterfly tends to enter hibernation by mid to late September. Typically this butterfly will try to hibernate in dark sheltered locations. Because of this hibernation, they need to accumulate a lot of fat to survive the winter. The tortoiseshell needs at least 20% of its body weight in lipids in order to survive, making them much slower. Towards the end of their foraging for hibernation, they are much more susceptible to attacks by birds because of their low muscle to body mass ratio. During the first few weeks of hibernation, tortoiseshell butterflies are very susceptible to predator attacks. Up to 50% of the population hibernating in any given area can be eaten. The butterflies that hibernate in areas containing more light, and that are accessible to rodents who can climb, are the most susceptible to this type of predation. During hibernation tortoiseshell butterflies are able to supercool in order to keep from freezing. In sheltered areas, these butterflies can stand up to −21 degrees Celsius without freezing. However, they experience rapid weight loss during unusually mild winters.

== Developmental stages ==
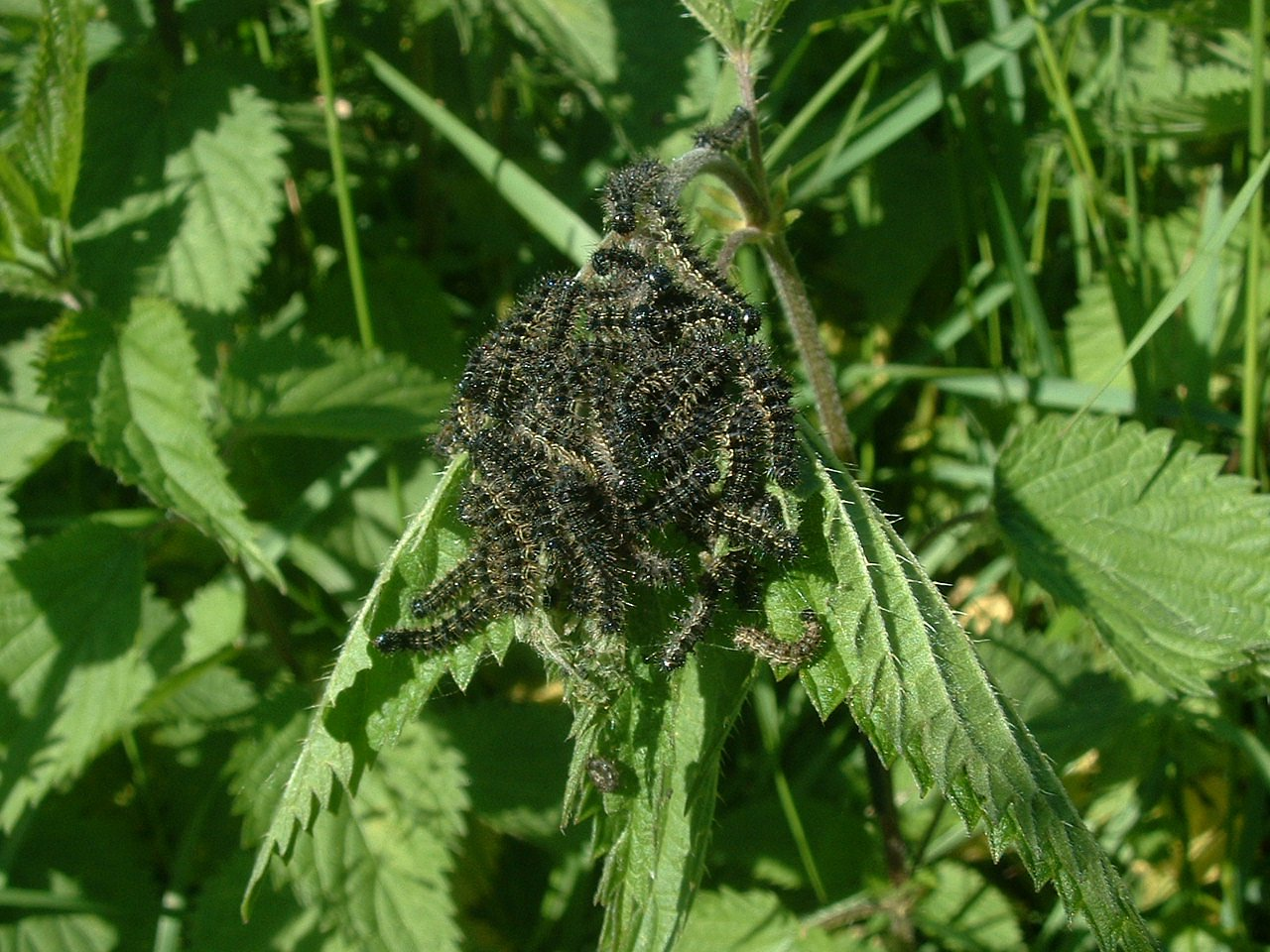
Young caterpillars live in groups

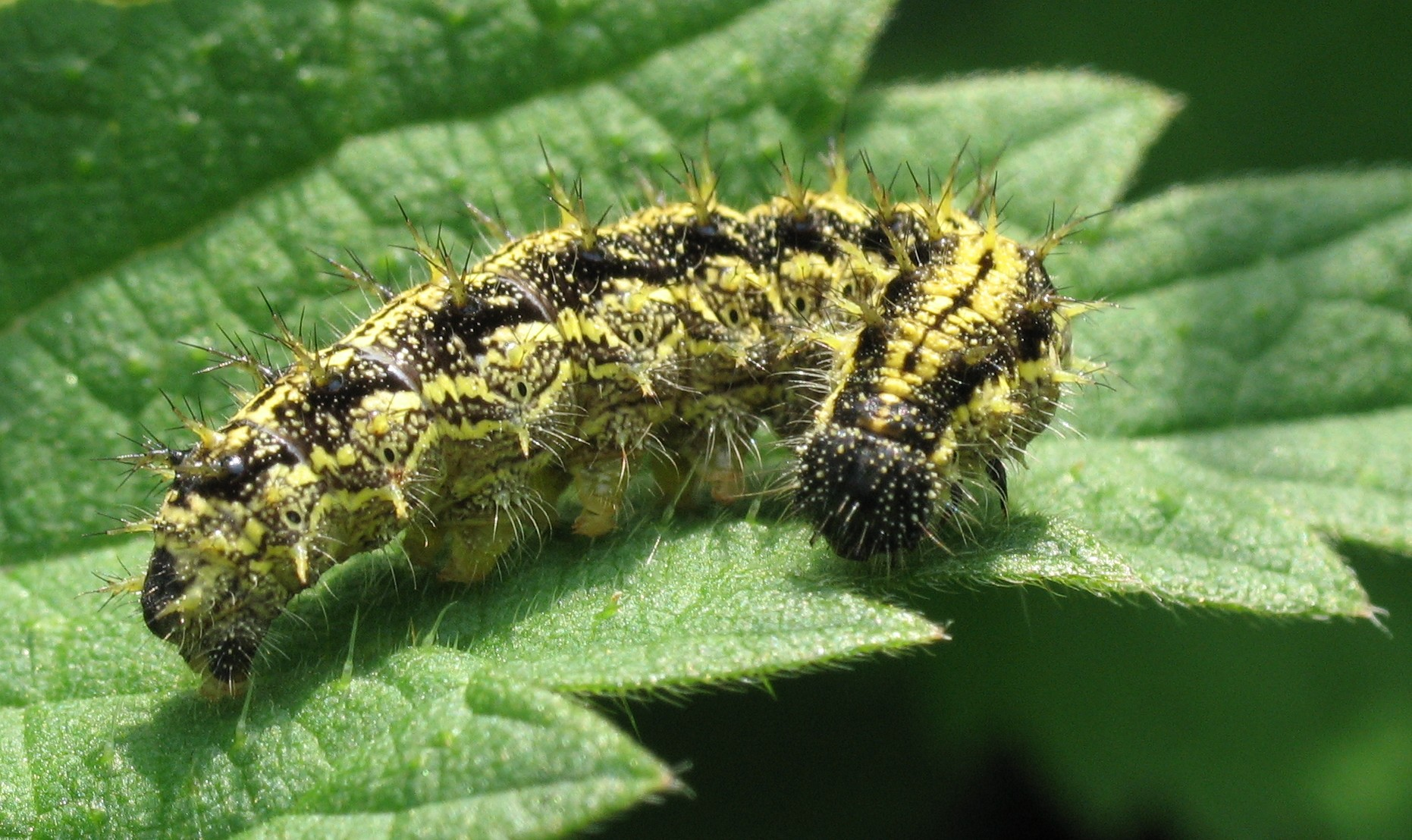
Older caterpillars are solitary

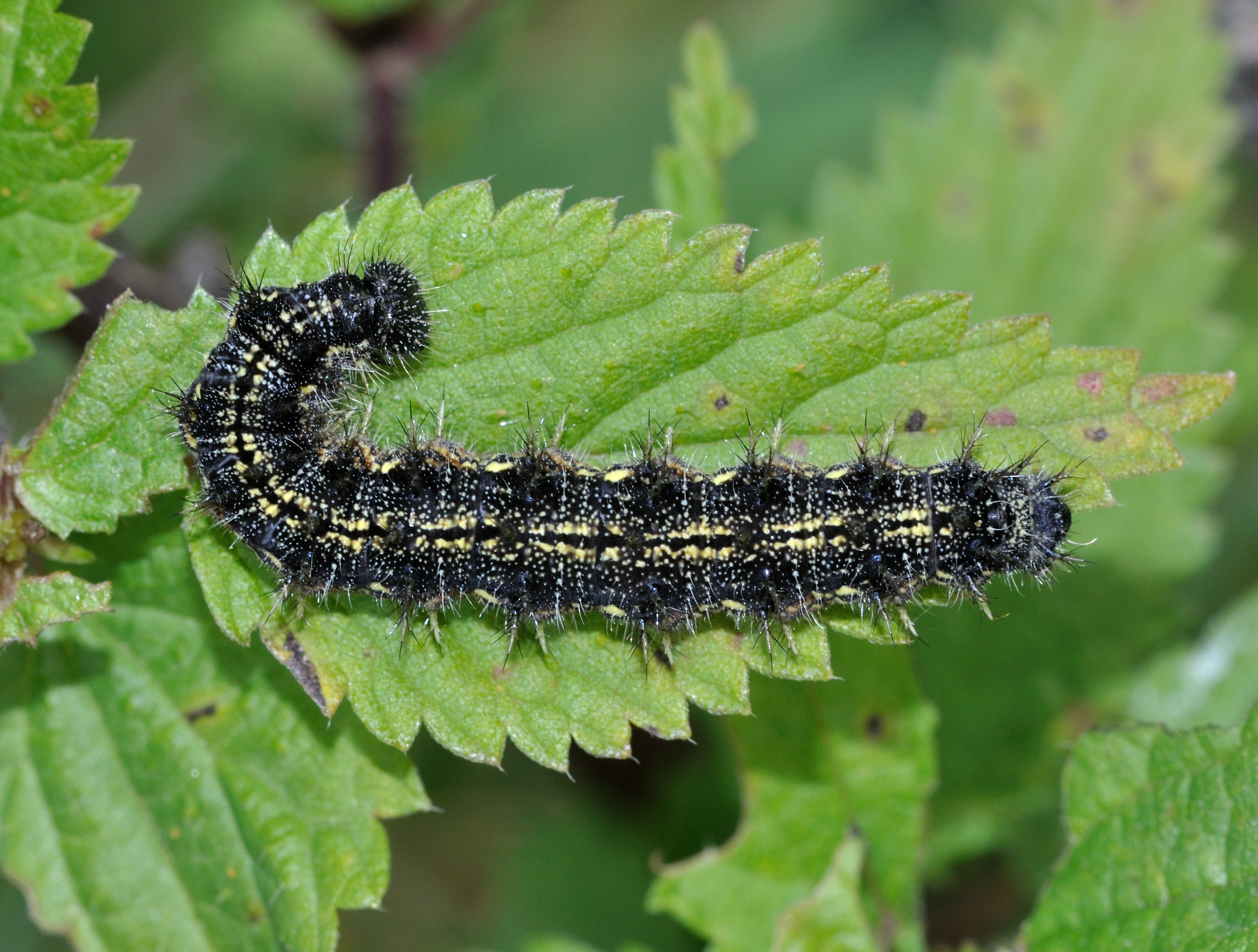
Caterpillar on a stinging nettle in Oberursel, Germany

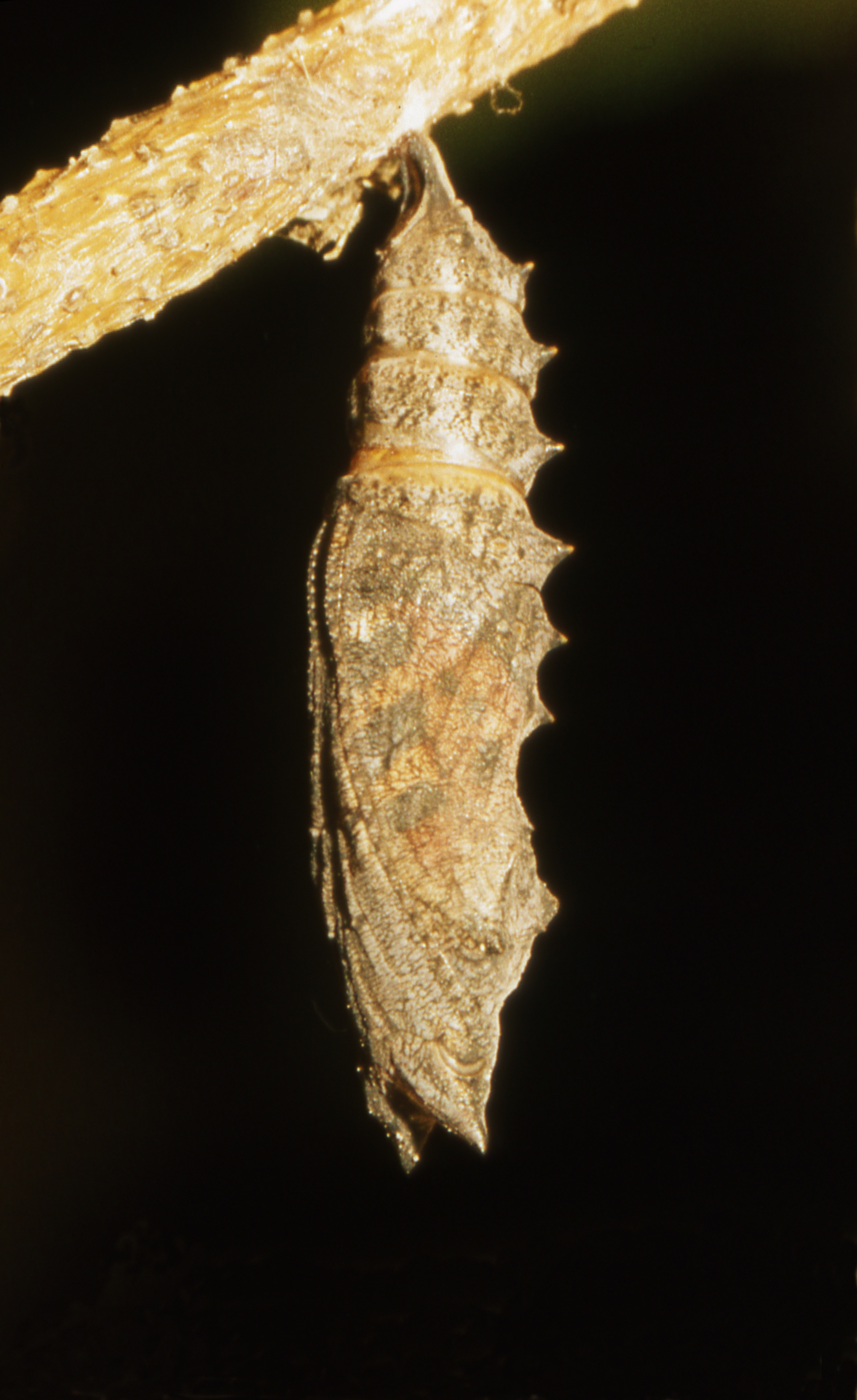
Chrysalis shortly before hatching

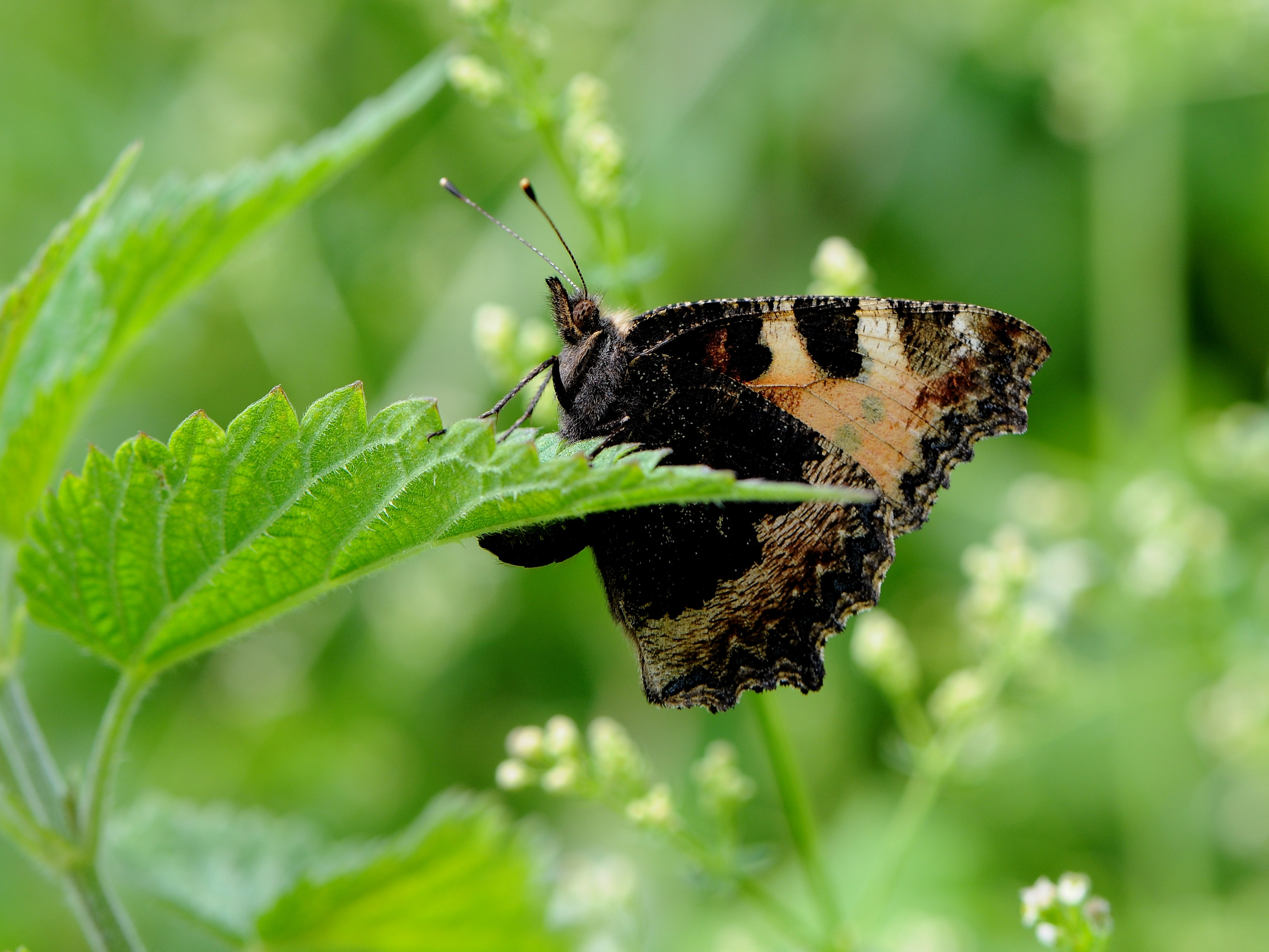
During oviposition

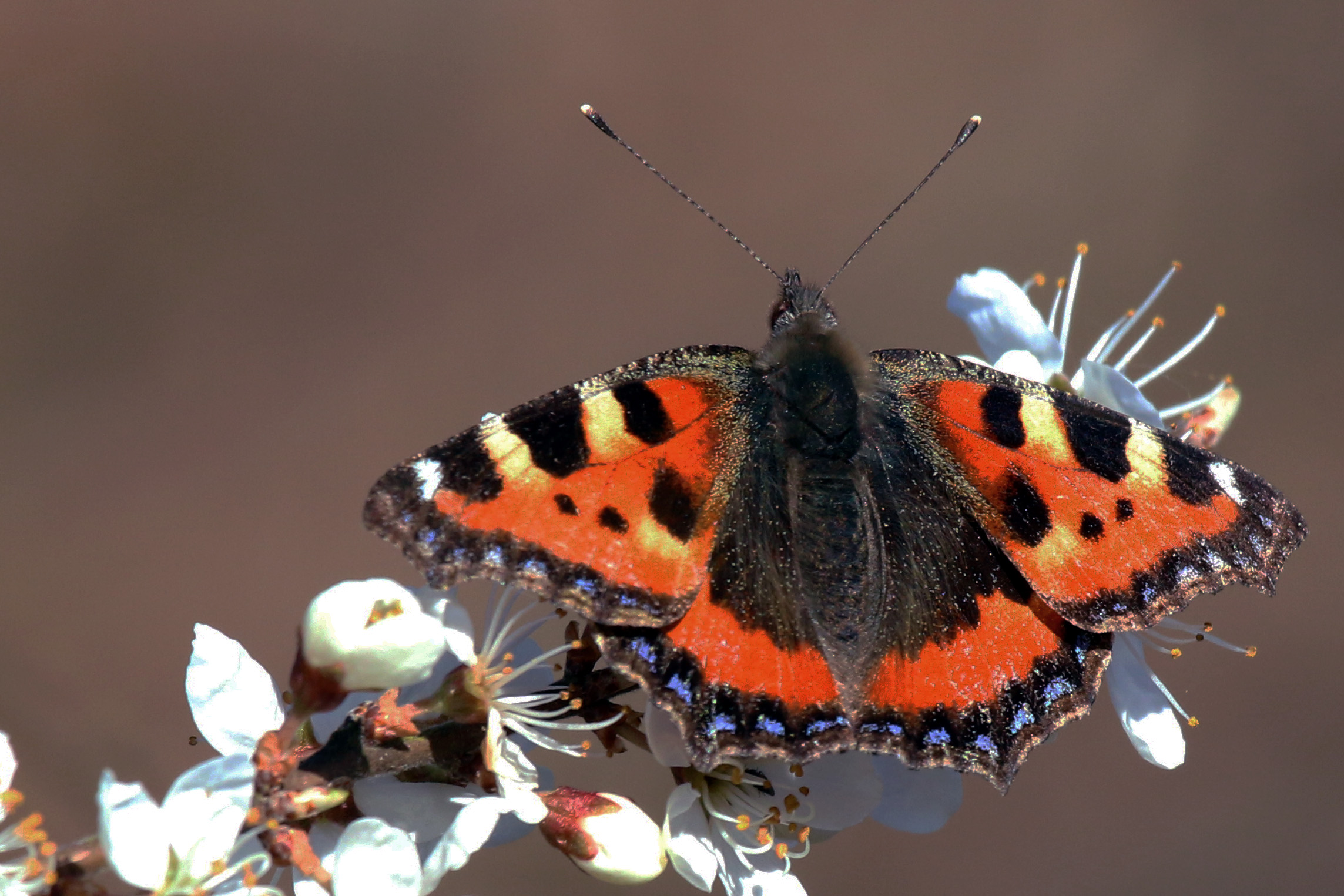
After hibernation: mid-March at Otmoor, Oxfordshire

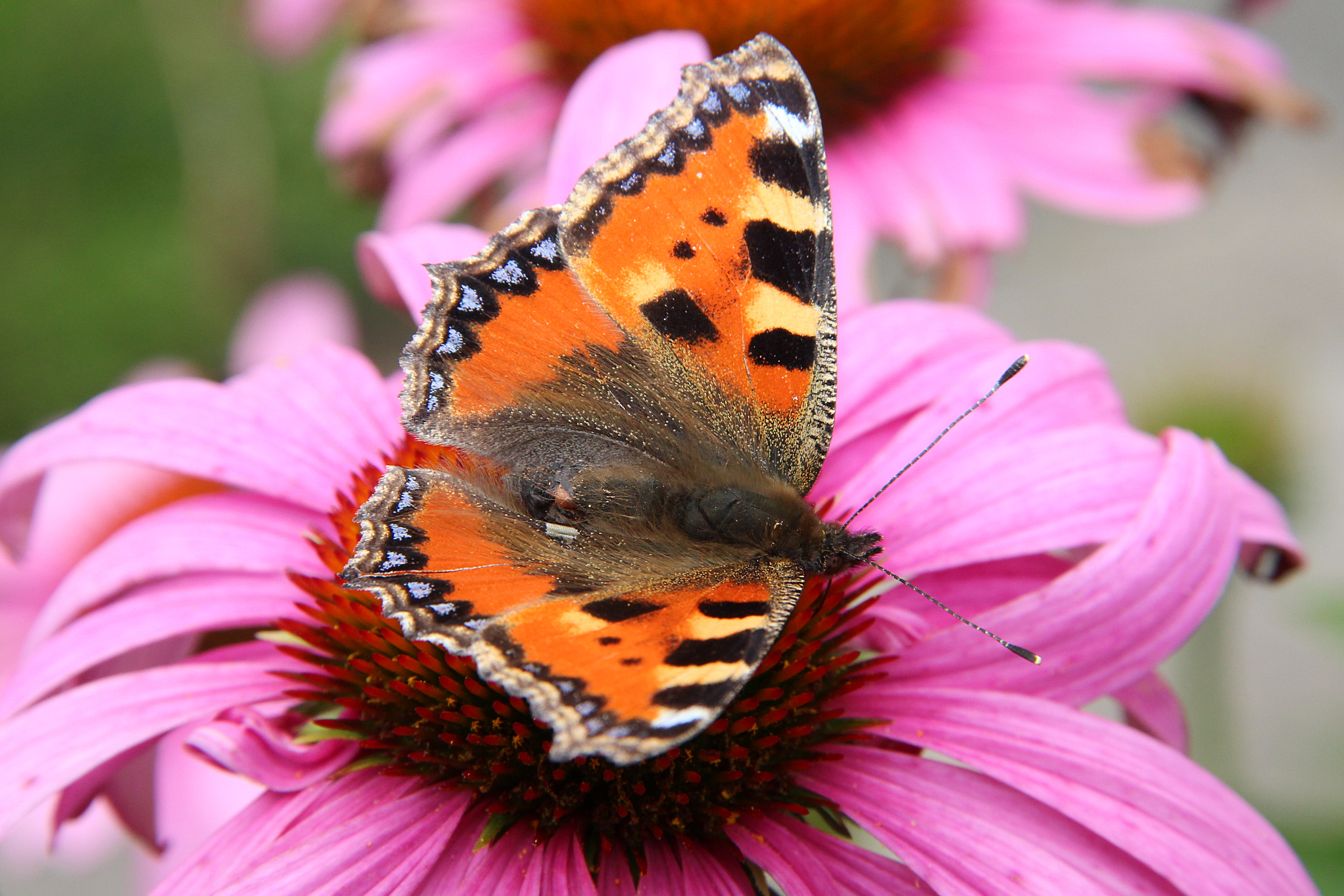
On Echinacea in Havré, Belgium

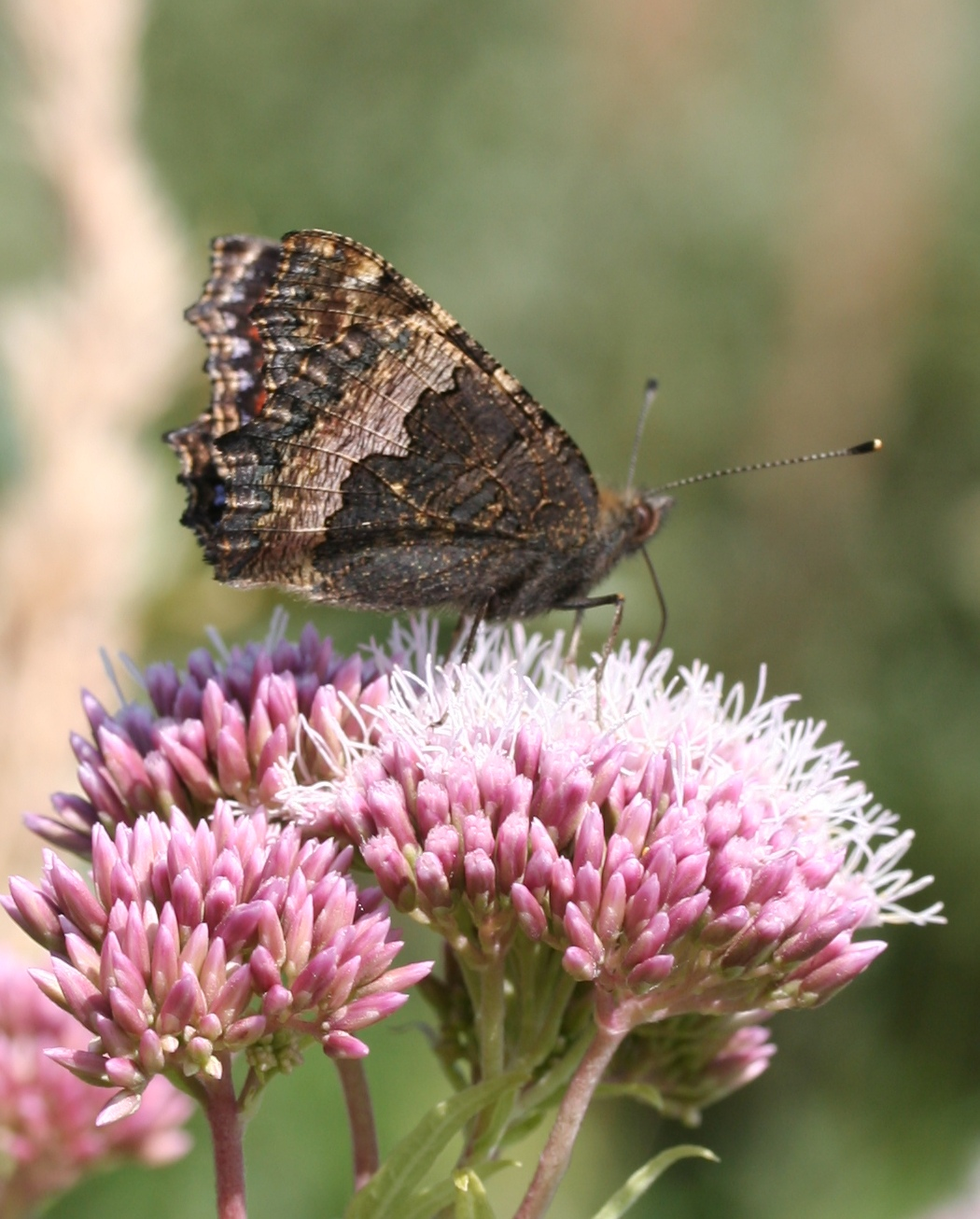
Underside of wings

== Behaviour ==
=== Predator defence ===
The wings of tortoiseshell butterflies help conceal them extremely well from predators. When closed, their wings look like leaves, helping them to hide. On the ground, it may take birds up to 30 minutes to see them. In addition to this, when discovered, tortoiseshell butterflies will flick their wings open to reveal bright colours. While they don't have eyespots like many other butterflies, these bright contrasting colours can often scare a predator, giving the tortoiseshell butterfly ample time to escape. Not only does this colouration tend to frighten birds, it can also act as a warning. The bright red colouration serves as a cautionary sign to the predator about the poor taste of the butterfly. Tortoiseshell butterflies tend to be unpalatable to birds. If a bird sees this bright red colouring, then they will be less likely to eat the butterfly.

The tortoiseshell butterfly is particularly fast. When discovered and attacked by a predator the tortoiseshell butterfly will fly away in a straight line in order to outstrip the predator.

=== Territorial defence ===
Most butterflies fail to display any territorial behaviour, probably due to selective environmental pressures. The female tortoiseshell butterflies generally are found in concentrated areas, so it is advantageous for males to stay in that particular area to increase their mating opportunities. Male butterflies usually bask and feed until mid-day and then display territorial behaviour until roosting. Males typically defend a certain territory for up to 90 minutes, unless they attempt to follow a female or are ousted by another male. The next day they find a new territory to defend. These territories tend to be in direct sunlight in areas that females choose to lay their eggs. More often than not, two or more males may end up sharing territory if the cost of defending the territory is greater than the benefit gained from monopolising the females.

=== Male-male interaction ===
In order for one male butterfly to gain dominance over the other, he must reach a position slightly above the other butterfly. The non-dominant male will then attempt a series of dives and climbs to escape the pursuer. After a certain distance travelled from the nest, one butterfly will return to the territory while the other flies along in search of another suitable location.

== Feeding ==
For most adult butterflies, including the small tortoiseshell butterfly, nectar is one of the main sources of nutrients. In order to obtain the nectar, the butterfly must be able to recognize distinct floral aromas and colours. The small tortoiseshell butterfly is able to differentiate between various flowers through visual signals. Tortoiseshell butterflies in particular tend to prefer colours at both ends of the visible light spectrum for humans, 400 nm and 600 nm. These correspond to the colours violet and red respectively. This ability comes from their compound eye. The flowers depend on the butterflies for pollination, so it is a mutually beneficial relationship.

== Migratory patterns ==
During migration, tortoiseshell butterflies position themselves in accordance with air currents; they only start migration at certain wind speeds. They are able to do this because of an extra sensory organ in their antennae. These butterflies have a developed Johnston's organ in their second antennae responsible for determining air currents in a number of other insects. Because their host plants, Urtica dioica, grow in widely distributed areas, tortoiseshell butterflies tend to move around more than some other butterflies. These areas tend to be short thickets and shrubs.
