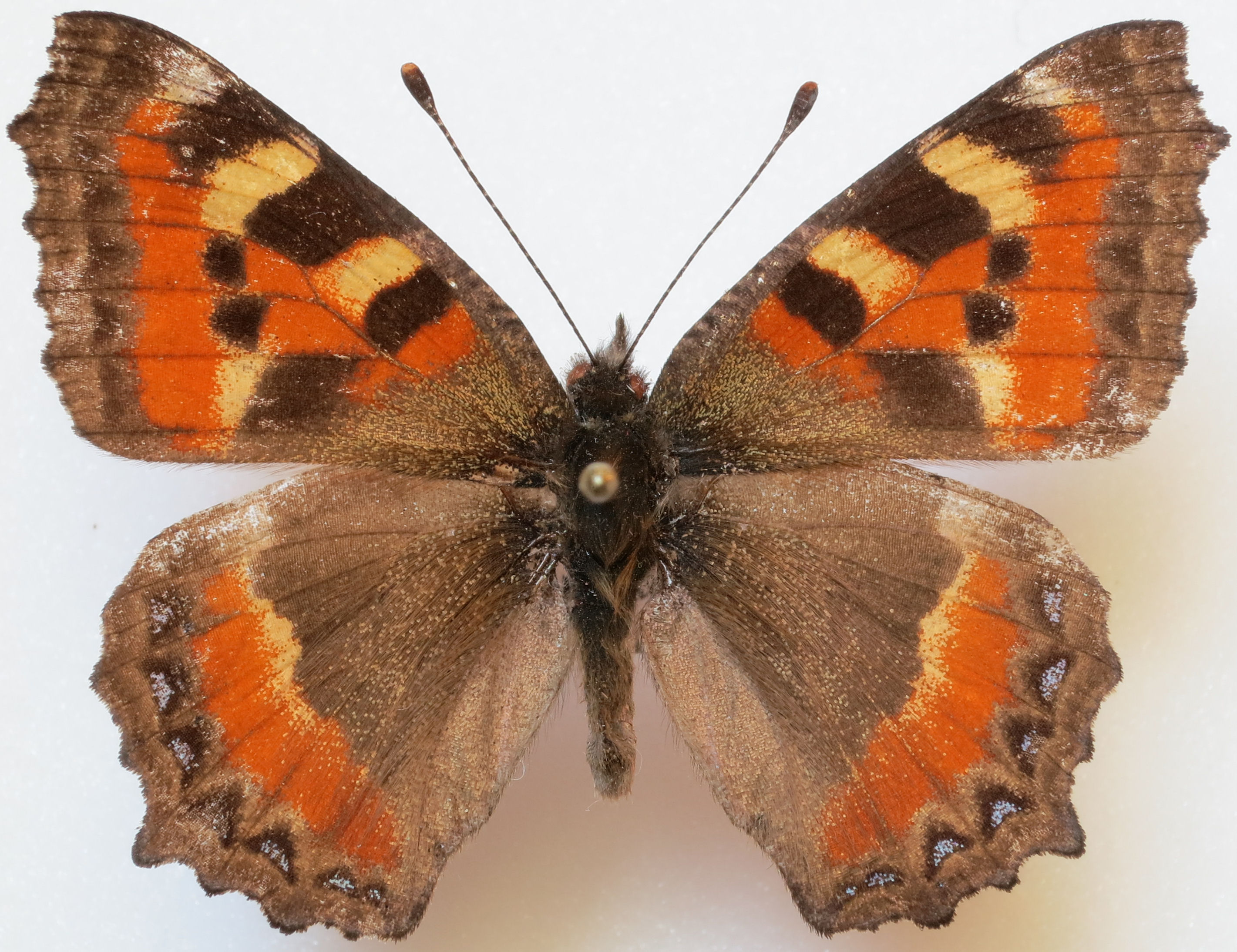

Scientific classification
- Domain: Eukaryota
- Kingdom: Animalia
- Phylum: Arthropoda
- Class: Insecta
- Order: Lepidoptera
- Family: Nymphalidae
- Genus: Aglais
- Species: A. rizana

Binomial name
- Aglais rizana (Moore, 1872)

Synonyms
- Vanessa rizana Moore, 1872; Nymphalis rizana

= Aglais rizana =

Mountain tortoiseshell

Species of butterfly

Aglais rizana, the mountain tortoiseshell, is a species of nymphalid butterfly found in Asia.

== Distribution ==
Pamirs to Alay Range, Afghanistan, northwest Himalayas.

== Description ==
Frederic Moore (1872) gives a detailed description for Vanessa rizana:

Male. Differs from V. cashmirensis in being a smaller and more compact insect, and having the fore wing less produced at the apex; markings and colours disposed as in that species, but more clearly denned and the colours much brighter : fore wing with the red colour near the base descending to near the submedian vein, the posterior black spot being quadrate, well denned, and broadly bordered outward with clear yellow, this colour also bordering the two upper discal spots; submarginal black border narrow : hind wing with the

black base bordered outwardly by clear yellow; the submarginal row of dentate blue-centred black lunules being without the broad inner dusky border. Underside darker than in V. cashmirensis; markings similar. Expanse 1-7/8 inch.

Hab. Cheeni (9000 feet), Middle Kunawur, N.W. Himalaya.

— Frederic Moore
