= Turtle (magazine) =

US magazine for children

- Categories: Children's magazine
- Frequency: Bi-monthly
- First issue: October 1979
- Final issue: 2014
- Company: Saturday Evening Post Society
- Country: United States
- Based in: Indianapolis, Indiana
- Website: www.uskidsmags.com/magazines/turtle/

Turtle was a bi-monthly American magazine for children ages 2 to 5. It existed between 1979 and 2014, and featured short stories, poems, games, comics, rebuses, recipes, crafts, and more. It was headquartered in Indianapolis, Indiana.

== History ==
Turtle was launched by The Benjamin Franklin Literary & Medical Society in December 1979. The first editor of Turtle was Beth Wood Thomas, who continued to edit the magazine until January 1991. Christine French Clark took over in March of that year and continued through September 1994. Elizabeth A. Rinck became Turtle’s next editor, followed by Steve Charles and Janet F. Hoover in 1995 and Nancy S. Axelrad in 1996.

Children’s author Terry Webb Harshman took the editorial reins in 1997 and continued under the direction of Steven Slon. Turtle was one of three children’s publications in the U.S. Kids family of magazines, published by the Children’s Better Health Institute, a division of the nonprofit Saturday Evening Post Society. Its sister publications under the U.S. Kids banner were Humpty Dumpty (for children ages 5 to 7) and Jack and Jill (for children ages 7 to 12).

As of the March/April 2014 issue Turtle merged with Humpty Dumpty. Effective with that issue Humpty Dumpty was designed for children aged 3 to 5.

== Features ==
Features included the annual U.S. Kids Cover Contest, which awarded more than $25,000 for school art programs. Each issue of Turtle also included age-appropriate games, puzzles and interactive activities that encouraged problem-solving and critical thinking.

== Notable contributors ==
Notable contributors included Charles Ghigna, poet and author Eileen Spinelli, comic book writer Justin Gray and author/illustrator Valeri Gorbachev.

== Awards ==
- Parents’ Choice Award Approved Winner, 2012
- Association of Educational Publishers Distinguished Achievement Award for “ABC Stick Puppets,” 2011
- Parents’ Choice Approved Award Winner, 2011
- iParenting Media Awards Best Product Winner, 2009
