= Chelys =

Ancient Greek stringed musical instrument

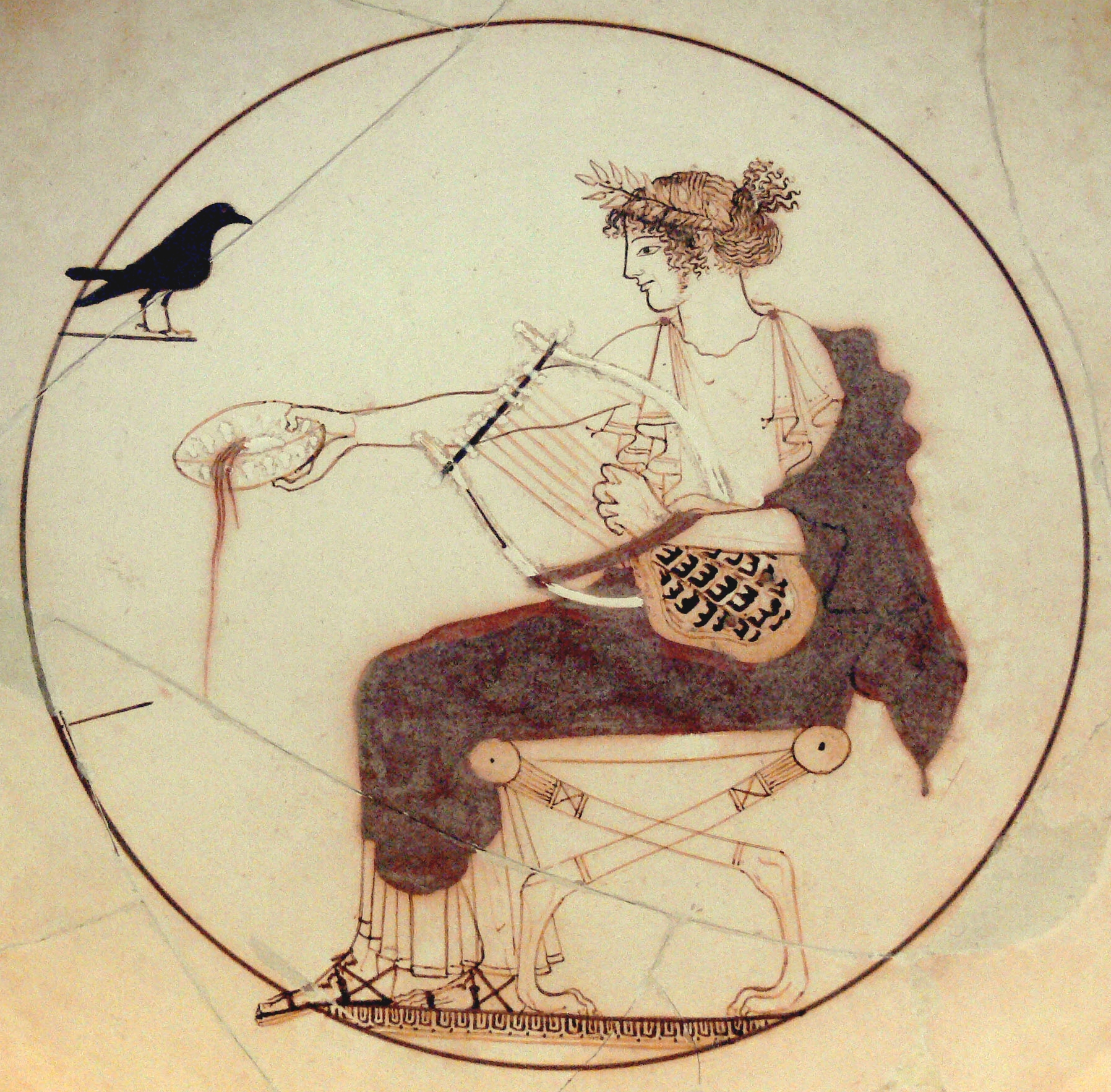
Cylix of Apollo with the chelys lyre, on a 5th-century BC drinking cup (kylix)

The chelys or chelus (Greek: χέλυς, Latin: testudo, both meaning "turtle" or "tortoise") was a string instrument, the common lyre of the ancient Greeks, which had a convex back of tortoiseshell or of wood shaped like the shell. The word chelys was used in allusion to the oldest lyre of the Greeks, which was said to have been invented by Hermes. According to the Homeric Hymn to Hermes, he came across a tortoise near the threshold of his mother's home and decided to hollow out the shell to make the soundbox of an instrument with seven strings.

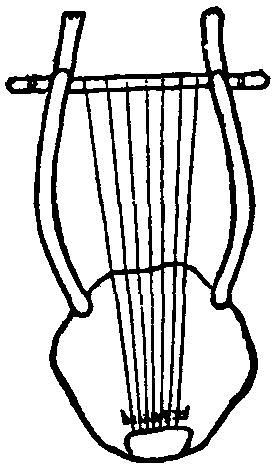
Ancient Greek chelys or lyre from a drawing on a vase in the British Museum

The word has been applied arbitrarily since classic times to various stringed instruments, some bowed and some plucked, probably owing to the back being much vaulted. Athanasius Kircher (Musurgia universalis, 486) applied the name of chelys to a kind of viol with eight strings. Numerous representations of the chelys lyre or testudo occur on Greek vases, in which the actual tortoiseshell is depicted. A good illustration is given in Le Antichità di Ercolano Esposte (vol. I, p. 1, 43). Propertius (iv. 6) calls the instrument the lyra testudinea. Joseph Justus Scaliger was probably the first writer to draw attention to the difference between the chelys and the kithara.

The acoustics of an authentically reconstructed ancient Greek tortoise-shell lyre, known as chelys, was investigated in 2011. Modern experimental methods were employed, such as electronic speckle pattern laser interferometry and impulse response, to extract the vibrational behavior of the instrument and its main parts. Additionally, the emitted sound from the instrument was recorded, under controlled conditions, and spectrally analyzed. Major findings include the concentration of the emitted sound between 400 Hz and 800 Hz, with an amplitude modified in a manner consistent with the experimentally measured vibrational characteristics of the instrument’s sound box and bridge. The experimental results validate the historical evidence that chelys was used in Greek antiquity as an accompaniment instrument to the human voice.
