= Jewel (given name) =

Female given name

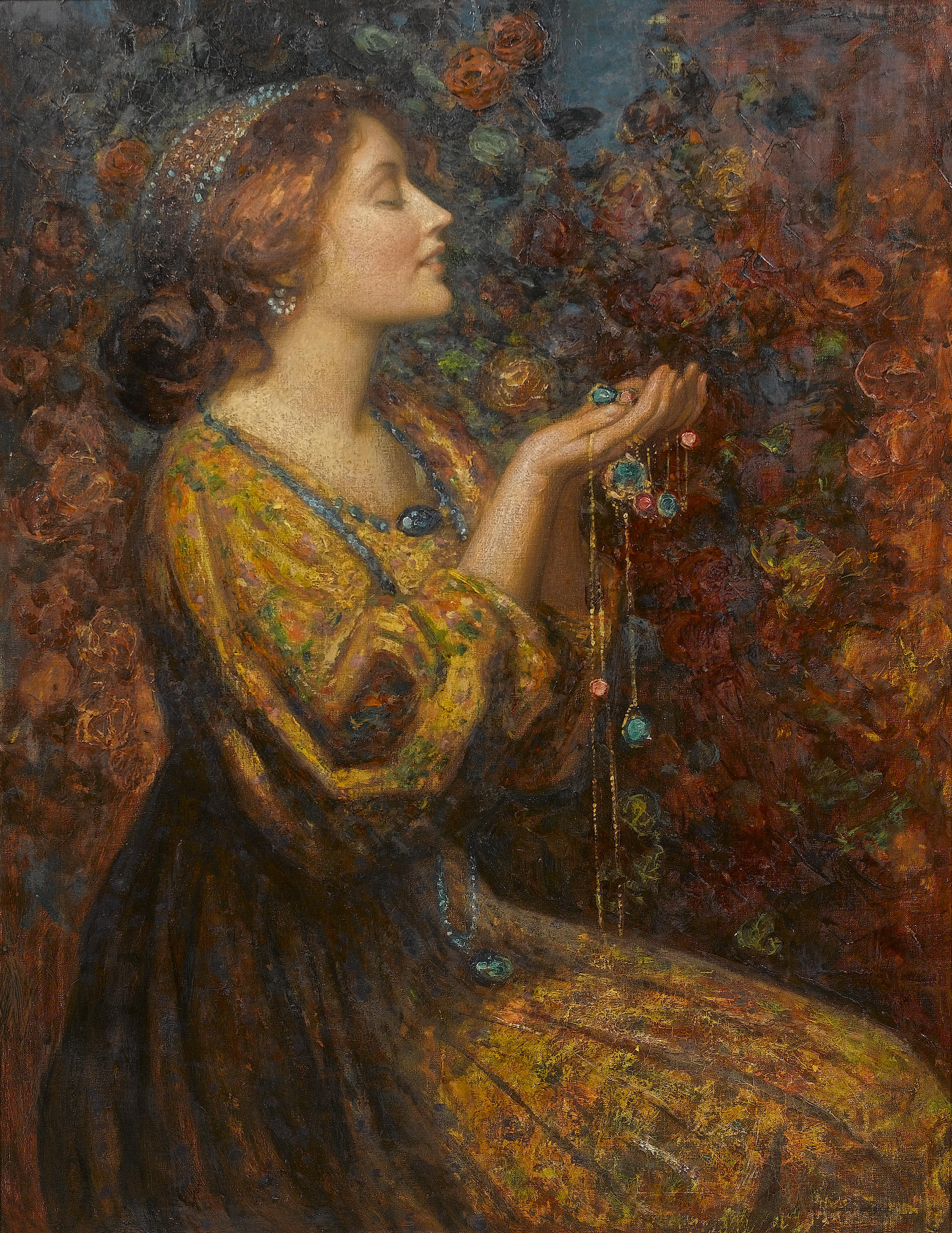
- Jewels by Thomas Edwin Mostyn
- Pronunciation: JOOL or JOO-ul
- Gender: Unisex
- Language: English

Origin
- Meaning: Gemstone

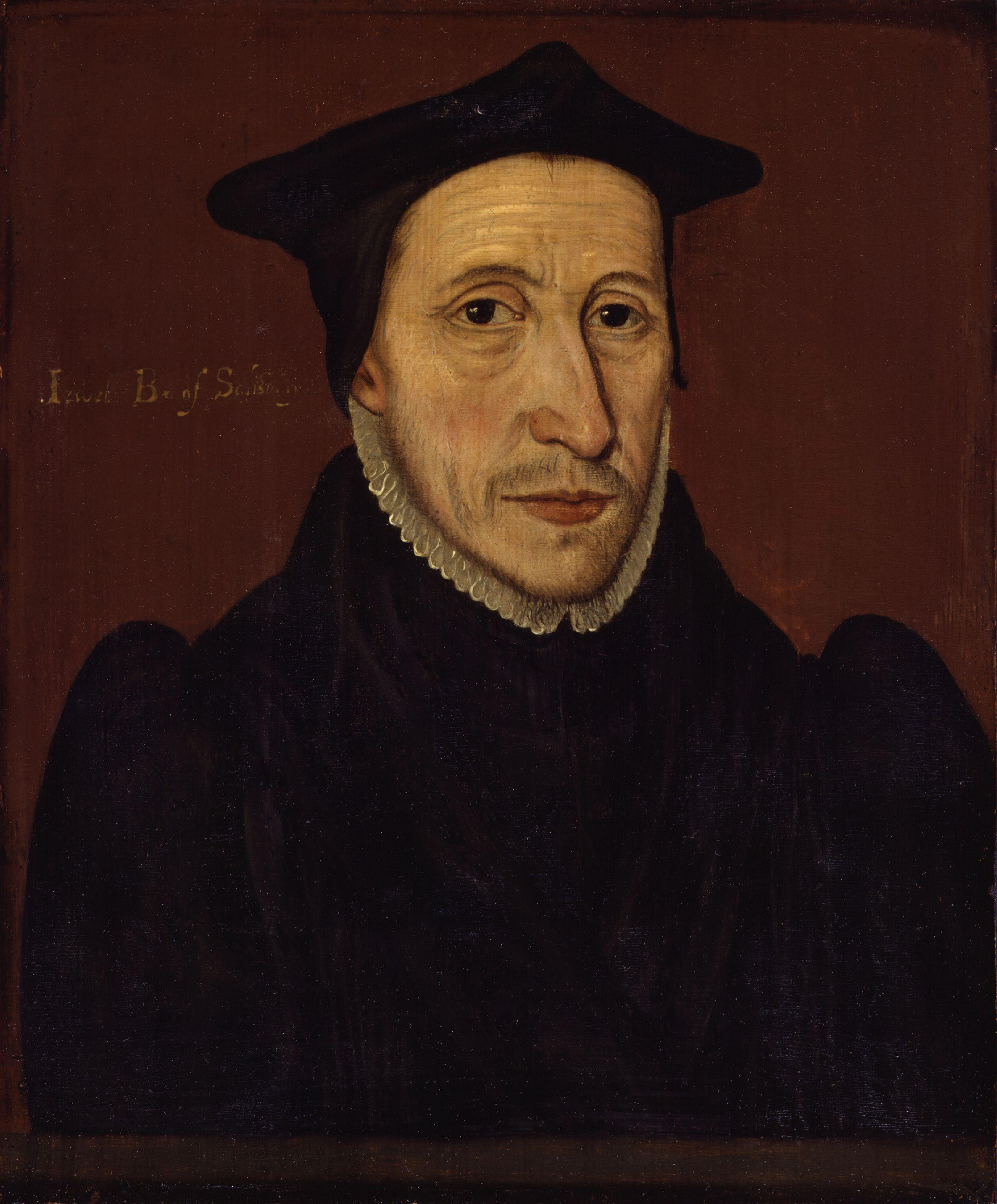
John Jewel (1522–1571), Bishop of Salisbury

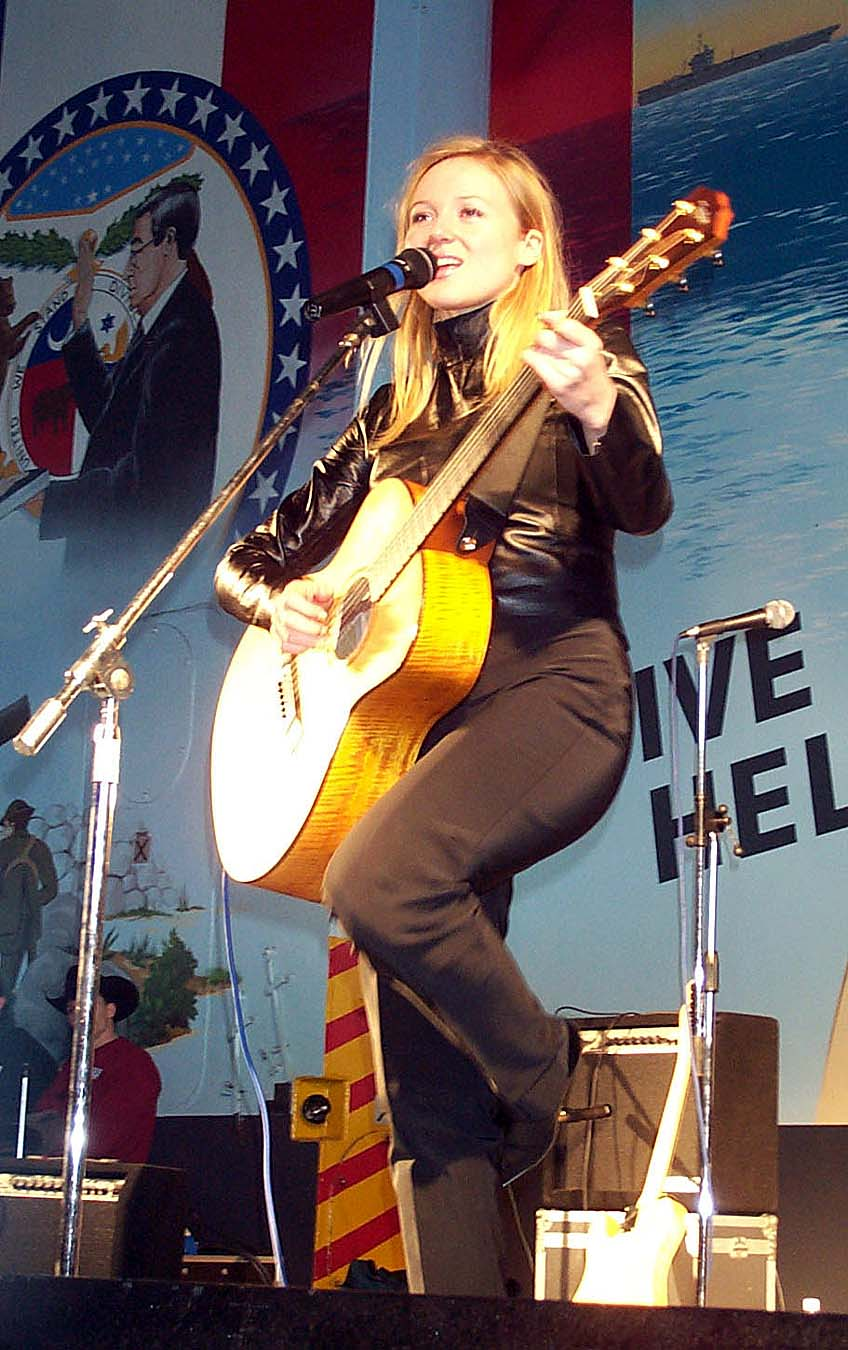
American singer Jewel Kilcher in 2000

Jewel is an English given name often given in reference to the English vocabulary word meaning gemstone. The word jewel comes from the Old French word jouel, meaning toy or delight, and was ultimately derived from the Latin term jocus. The name might have originated as an affectionate pet name or been inspired by other gemstone names also in fashion in the Anglosphere during the 19th century. The name is also sometimes a transferred use of the surname Jewel or Jewell, which comes from the Breton surname Judicaël. Some parents might have named their children after John Jewel, a 16th-century Bishop of Salisbury.

== Usage ==
Jewel was among the top 1,000 most popular names for girls in the United States between 1880 and 1968 and again between 1997 and 2019. It was at the height of its popularity between 1898 and 1930, when it was among the top 250 names for American girls. It peaked in 1904, when it was ranked in 198th position on the popularity chart. The name also ranked among the top 1,000 names for American boys at different times between 1880 and 1952.

== Women ==
- Jewel Amoah, South African feminist and human rights scholar and activist
- Jewel Blanch (born 1958), Australian country singer-songwriter
- Jewel H. Bronaugh, American government official who served as the 14th Deputy Secretary of Agriculture of the United States
- Jewel Brown, American jazz and blues singer
- Jewel Plummer Cobb (1924–2017), American biologist, cancer researcher, professor, dean, and academic administrator
- Jewel Coburn (née Blanch) (born 1958), Australian music publisher, singer and former actress
- Jewel De'Nyle, American pornographic actress and director
- Jewel Flowers (1923–2006), American pin-up model
- Jewel Forde, Barbadian television producer and presenter
- Jewel Kilcher (born 1974), American singer known as Jewel
- Jewel King (1910–1997), American rhythm and blues singer
- Jewel Lansing (born 1930), American writer and politician
- Jewel Mary, Indian actress and television presenter
- Jewel McGowan (1921–1962), American swing dancer
- Jewel Mische (born 1990), Filipina former model and actress
- Jewel Peterson (born 1981), American professional tennis player
- Jewel Prestage (1931–2014), American political scientist, citizen activist, educator, mentor, and author
- Jewel Restaneo (born 1991), American actress and songwriter
- Jewel Shepard (born 1958), American writer, photographer, and actress
- Jewel Simon (1911–1996), American teacher, artist, and poet
- Jewel Burks Solomon, American tech entrepreneur and venture capitalist
- Jewel Staite (born 1982), Canadian actress
- Jewel Taylor (born 1963), Liberian politician and 30th vice president of Liberia

== Pen name ==
- Jewel Kats, pen name of Canadian children's author Michelle Meera Katyal (1978–2016)

== Stage name ==
- Jewel Carmen, stage name of American silent film actress Florence Quick (1897–1984)

== Men ==
- Jewel Ackah (1945–2018), Ghanaian highlife and gospel musician
- Jewel Aich (born c. 1950), Bangladeshi magician and bansuri player
- Jewel Akens (1933–2013), American singer and record producer
- Jewel Andrew (born 2006), Antiguan cricket player
- Jewel Bey (born 1969), Indian footballer
- Jewel Ens (1889–1950), American baseball player, manager, and coach
- Jewel Kelly Jr., American politician
- Jewel Ponferada (born 1988), Filipino professional basketball player
- Jewel Raja (born 1990), Indian professional footballer
- Jewel Rana (born 1995), Bangladeshi professional footballer
