= Regenia =

Regenia is a given name. Notable people with the given name include:

- Regenia Gagnier (born 1953), American literary scholar
- Regenia A. Perry (born 1941), American art historian
