= Regenia A. Perry =

American art historian and curator

- Born: March 30, 1941 (age 85); Granville County, North Carolina, U.S.
- Education: Virginia State College; Western Reserve University; University of Pennsylvania; Yale University
- Known for: Educator, art historian, curator, folklorist

Regenia A. Perry is one of the first African American women to earn a Ph.D. in art history. In 1975, Perry served as the first African American guest curator at the Metropolitan Museum of Art in New York. She has written extensively about African American artists and folk artists.

== Early life and education ==
Perry was born in Granville County, North Carolina to Jessie L. Perry and Marie M. Peace. Her father was a tobacco farmer. She was the second child, after an older brother.

Perry attended Virginia State College, where she earned a bachelor's degree in Fine Arts Education in 1961. The following year, she earned her master's degree in the history of art at Western Reserve University. Perry later completed courses towards a Ph.D. at the University of Pennsylvania. She completed her Ph.D. in the history of art in 1966 at Western Reserve University.

Perry credits Mrs. Lola H. Solice (1910–1993), superintendent of Granville County, North Carolina Negro Schools during the 1950s, as one who influenced her the most.

One of Perry's nieces is Dr. Lynn Perry Wooten, the ninth president of Simmons University and the first African American to hold the position.

== Career ==
Perry taught art history at number of universities. In the 1960s, she taught at Georgetown University, University of Maryland, Howard University and Indiana State University. In 1967, Perry and Rizpah L. Welch, Ed.D. were the first two full-time African American faculty members employed by Richmond Professional Institute, later name Virginia Commonwealth University.

For twenty-five years she was a professor at Virginia Commonwealth University School of the Arts. She retired in 1990. In 2000, Perry established the Regenia A. Perry Merit Scholarship at the university.

In 1975, Perry was named guest curator of the Metropolitan Museum of Art for 1975–76. She was the first African American serving in this capacity at the museum. Perry would be responsible for selecting works for the museum's exhibit on 19th century African American art as well as negotiating possible acquisitions for the museum's permanent collection. The exhibit Selections of Nineteenth-Century Afro-American Art included 92 pieces by various artists including Joshua Johnson, Jules Lion, Henry O. Tanner, and Harriet Powers.

Perry amassed a collection of 3,000 African American folk artifacts, including 300 Black Santas, angles and other ethnic holiday items. Perry's extensive Black doll collection has been loaned for exhibition. In 2003, Perry curated Sugar and Spice: Black Dolls from the Dr. Regenia Perry Collection and the Black Doll Museum, Philadelphia at the African American Museum in Dallas, Texas.

Perry founded Raven Arts, an art consulting firm in New Orleans focused on African American folk artists.

== Honors and legacy ==
- Virginia Museum of Fine Arts established the Regenia A. Perry Assistant Curator of Global Contemporary Art position in 2021. The first to hold the position is Alexis Assam.

== Curated exhibits ==
Perry curated or co-curated the following selected exhibits:

- Impact '79: Afro-American Women Artists: April 2 to 20, 1979. FAMU Art Gallery, Florida A & M University, Tallahassee, FL. Curated by Perry. Artists featured included: Camille Billops, Vivian E. Browne, Doris C. Colbert, Oletha DeVane, Wilhelmina Godfrey, Lana T. Henderson, Adrienne W. Hoard, Martha E. Jackson, Winnie Owens, Betye Saar, Elizabeth Scott, Joyce Scott, Jewel W. Simon, and Yvonne Edwards Tucker.
- James Van Der Zee's New York. Carriero Gallery, Massachusetts College of Art, Boston, MA, Feb. 21 – March 11, 1983.
- Near the End: Artistic Prophecies by Ruth Mae McCrane, January 17 – March 23, 1997. Afro-American Cultural Center, Charlotte, North Carolina. 36-piece exhibit featuring folk-art paintings by McCrane. Curated by Perry.
- Selections of Nineteenth-Century Afro-American Art: June 19 – August 1, 1976. New York: Metropolitan Museum of Art. Curated by Perry.
- Spirit Work: Religion in African-American Folk Art. January 31 – March 10, 1990. Dallas, TX: Museum of African-American Life and Culture, 1990.

== Books and catalogs ==
- Art of the Kuba: Selected Works from the W. H. Sheppard Collection at Hampton University, Virginia Commonwealth University, Anderson Gallery, November 1979.
- Free Within Ourselves: African-American Artists in the Collection of the National Museum of American Art. San Francisco, Calif: National Museum of American Art in association with Pomegranate Artbooks, 1992. 205 pages. Introduction by Kinshasha Holman Conwill. ISBN 9781566400725
- Harriet Powers's Bible Quilts. [New York]: [Rizzoli International], 1994. 24 pages. 24 color illustrations. ISBN 9780847816538
- Impact '79: Afro-American Women Artists: April 2 to 20, 1979, Tallahassee, FL: FAMU Art Gallery, Florida A & M University, 1979. 16 unnumbered pages. OCLC 45124797
- James Van Der Zee's New York. Carreiro Gallery, Boston, MA: [publisher not identified], 1983. 8 pages. OCLC 9595945
- The Life and Works of Charles Frederick Schweinfurth: Cleveland Architect – 1856–1919. Ann Arbor, Mich: University Microfilms International, 1981. Perry's Ph.D. Western Reserve University dissertation, 1967. 273 pages. OCLC 7878352
- Selections of Nineteenth-Century Afro-American Art: June 19 – August 1, 1976. New York: Metropolitan Museum of Art, 1976. 46 unnumbered pages. OCLC 14020922
- Spirits or Satire: African American Face Vessels of the Nineteenth Century. Gibbs Art Gallery, Charleston, S.C., September 1985.
- What It Is: Black American Folk Art from the collection of Regenia A. Perry, Virginia Commonwealth University, Anderson Gallery, October 1982. 72 pages.

=== Book and catalogs with contributions by Perry ===
- Livingston, Jane, John Beardsley, and Regenia Perry. Black Folk Art in America, 1930–1980. Jackson: Published for the Corcoran Gallery of Art by the University Press of Mississippi, 1982. Perry authored the essay "Black American Folk Art: Origins and Early Manifestations."
- Smith, Todd D., Regenia Perry, John Hewitt, and Vivian Hewitt. Celebration and Vision: The Hewitt Collection of African-American Art. Charlotte, NC: Bank of America Corp, 1999. 101 pages.
- Perry, Regenia, and Maude Wahlman. Spirit Work: Religion in African-American Folk Art. Dallas, TX: MAALC, 1990.
- Riggs, Thomas. St. James Guide to Black Artists. Detroit, MI: St. James Press, 1998. Perry authored biographic articles on Edward Bannister, Leslie Bolling, William Edmondson, Minnie Evans, David Hammons, Jacob Lawrence, Elijah Pierce, Harriet Powers, Renee Stout, Mose Tolliver, Bill Traylor, Gregory Warmack and three others. ISBN 9781558622203
- Van Der Zee, James, Liliane DeCock-Morgan, Reginald McGhee, and Regenia Perry. James Van Der Zee. 1973. 159 pages. ISBN 9780871000392
- Van Der Zee, James, Patricia Bladon, and Regenia Perry. Roots in Harlem: Photographs by James Van Der Zee from the Collection of Regenia A. Perry: January 8 – February 19, 1989, Memphis Brooks Museum of Art. [Memphis, TN]: Memphis Brooks Museum of Art, 1988. 44 pages. OCLC 22887079

== Collections ==
The Regenia Perry papers, circa 1920–2017, are housed at Emory University, Stuart A. Rose Manuscript, Archives and Rare Book Library in Atlanta, Georgia. The 35-box collection includes art and artists files, photographs, slides and printed materials in the area of African American art history. Also included are works by Phillip Lindsay Mason, Willie Stokes, and James Van Der Zee. Binders from art collector Francois Mignon from the Melrose Plantation are also included.
