= Adrienne W. Hoard =

American artist (born 1949)

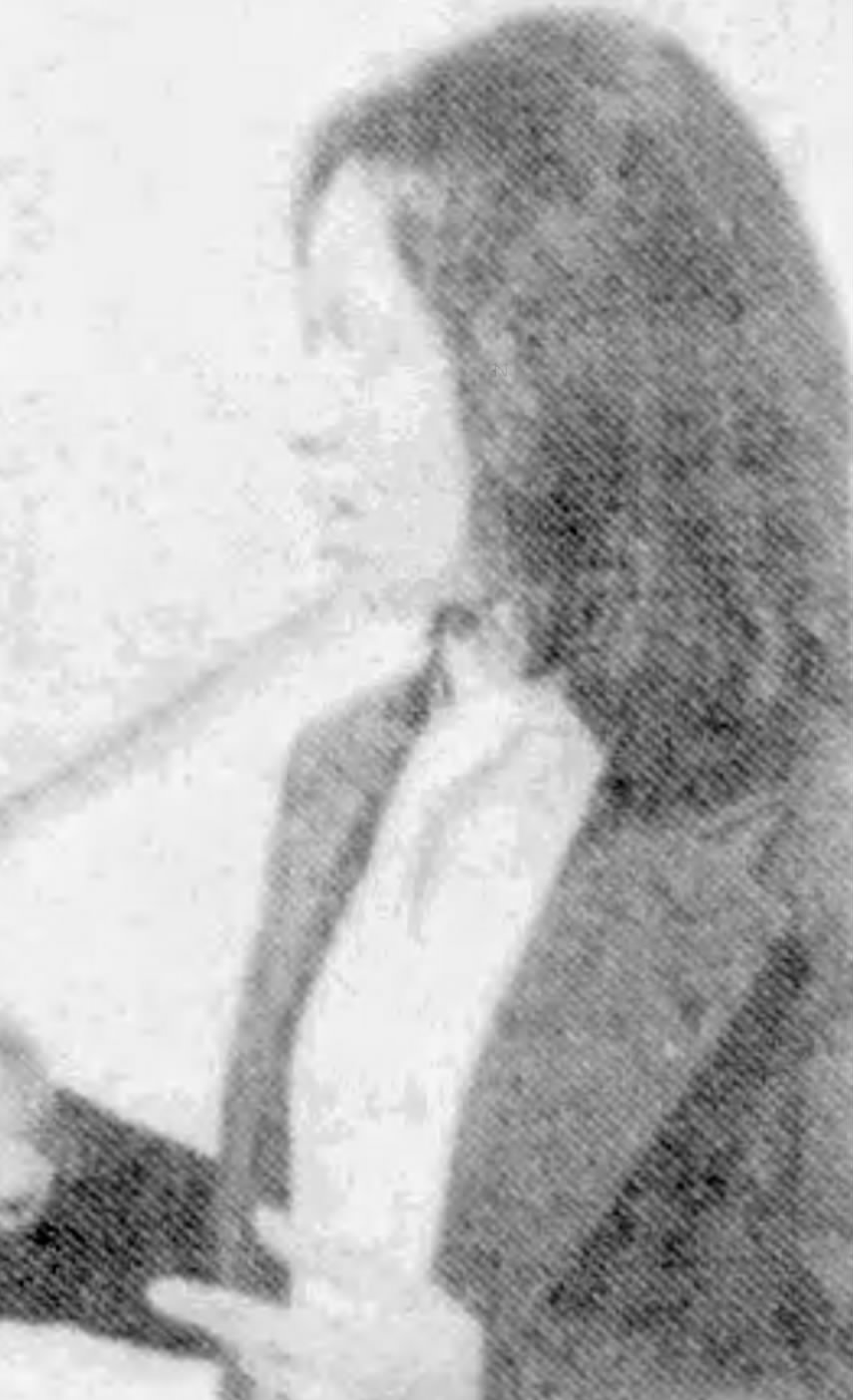
- Hoard in 1977
- Born: Adrienne Walker Hoard; January 22, 1948 (age 78); Jefferson City, Missouri, United States
- Education: Lincoln University, BS; University of Michigan, MFA; University of Illinois, Ed.D
- Known for: Painting
- Website: http://homegirlinc.com/homegirlinc/home/

Adrienne Walker Hoard (born January 22, 1949) is an African-American woman artist. She is well known for working with color and abstraction in her shaped canvas paintings and being influenced by her travels to different places in the world. She is a retired professor since 2019.

== Early life ==
Hoard was born in Jefferson City, Missouri, on January 22, 1949, as the first of three children to parents Charles M. Hoard and Yvonne W. Hoard who both taught at Lincoln University in Missouri. In 1957, she met her first African-American artist role model June Price, an art practice teacher at Washington School, the elementary section of the Lincoln University Laboratory School. In 1962, she won her first two art contests for a drawing of an imaginary man fly-fishing and a drawing of an imaginary lighthouse respectively. In 1963, she won her next two art contests with a drawing of an imaginary lighthouse and a pen & ink drawing of an imaginary student thinking about Latin exams and dreaming about gladiators respectively. She graduated from high school in 1966.

== Career ==
=== Academic career ===
==== Undergraduate and graduate (1966–72) ====
Hoard attended Northwestern University as a freshman in 1966 and stayed there up to 1968. She was studying psychology at first but disliked being in science labs. She continued her undergraduate studies and changed her studies to art at Lincoln University (MO) in 1968 where she would be able to be taught by James Dallas Parks (educator, painter, and co-founder of the National Conference of Artists), Leon Hicks (printmaker), Mary Jo Williams (watercolorist & jeweler), and Willie F. Longshore (photographer). She graduated with a BS degree in art education in 1970.

In 1971, she became an Horace H. Rackman School of Graduate Studies Teaching Associate at the University of Michigan. She studied drawing with Ted Ramsey. At the same time, she would be able to study painting with Maurice Vance and Al Weber, and study Afro-American Art with Robert Stull and James Chavers, graduating with a MFA in painting and a minor in museum studies in 1972.

==== Post-graduate (1972–81) ====
She took upon further study at the Alumni Museum, University of Michigan, studying museum philosophy and practice with Charles H. Sawyer. She also took on etching at the Printmaking Workshop in New York. From 1972 to 1973, she was an assistant professor of art at University of Arkansas, Pine Bluff. From 1973 to 1974, she was an instructor of drawing at the New York Phoenix School of Design. In 1973, she gained employment at the Brooklyn Museum. She was the Researcher-Cataloger for the Jennie Simpson Collection of African Art in 1973, the Head of Adult Education and director for their People-to-People programs in 1974, and stayed there until 1975 when she lost city employment as a result of New York City facing financial crisis. Later in 1975, she was able to become an assistant professor art and Black studies at Ohio State University.

A grant from Ohio State University Graduate School and College of Humanities in 1978 enabled her to travel to South Carolina, Georgia and the Sea Islands to do research on African decorative arts, specifically looking at sea grass baskets. Later that same year, her achievements as an artist and a teacher were written about in the journal Black Art and she had a feature in Ebony Magazine. The year following in 1979, Hoard wrote an article on Brenda Lynn Robinson's art for Mahogany Magazine.

1980 marks her beginning of her travel to a two year visit in Korea. (Note: In the Gumbo Ya Ya anthology, it is stated that Hoard studied in Seoul, South Korea as a Fulbright Scholar in 1975 and returned to Korea again in 1980. It is also mentioned in the St. James Guide to Black Artists that she studied in Seoul in 1975 and again later.) She received a one year Fulbright-Hays grant award which allowed her to go to South Korea for assistance in video tape recording and research on Korean art. During her time in Korea, she was a visiting professor at Hong-Ik University under the Department of Western oil painting and also a visiting professor at Ewha Women's University under the Department of Decorative Arts. In 1981, she was featured in a Korea Times article.

==== Doctoral program (1981–86) ====
After her stay in Korea, later in 1981, Hoard returned to the United States and began her doctoral program in art education at University of Illinois. She was also a graduate teaching associate during her time there from 1981 to 1982. In 1982, she became an art teacher at the University of Illinois Laboratory High School and taught there until 1985.

She was on the editorial associates team for Visual Arts Research from 1983 to 1986, a journal of visual arts and aesthetic education published twice a year by the University of Illinois Press. She was a visiting associate professor at Northwestern University under the Department of Art Theory and Practice from 1985 to 1986.

Hoard earned her doctorate in art education in 1986. Her dissertation examined how people with and without backgrounds in art analyzed visual structure in Abstract art, which she related to style discrimination and improving art education curriculum so that people could change the way they thought about art.

==== 1986–88 ====
Later in 1986 after she earned her Ed. D, Hoard left her previous position and became an associate professor of fine art and art education and also a college coordinator at Louisiana State University through 1988.

==== 1988–2013 ====
Hoard wrote an article for Gifted and Talented Digest in 1988. She also became an associate professor of fine art and art education at the University of Missouri-Columbia that same year. In 1989, she traveled to Brazil and presented and published "The Black Aesthetic: An Empirical Feeling" at the Third International Symposium on Art Teaching and Its History there. Her work examined the responses and recognition of African-American viewers to nonobjective art, particularly looking at the responses of African-American viewers to African-American abstract art. She found that participants were able to recognize cultural aspects in abstract artwork that are a part of what she establishes as a Black aesthetic. She also advocated for improving curriculum to be more inclusive of other cultures to increase understanding of nonobjective art in the conclusions of the paper.

In the summer of 1996, she traveled to South Africa independently to do research with Ndebele women artists.

"The Black Aesthetic" would be used and cited as support and an example for shifting attention from art an object to attention on context, product, and inquiry around the art as well later in 1996 in an article by Elizabeth Manley Delacruz. In 1997, Hoard reviewed Voices of Color: Art and Society in the Americas and through her review, shared her belief of building solidarity with others over differences and called for people to reflect on how and why they make meaning out of art. She also pushed for teaching children through a comprehensive art education that teaches about themselves and others and for art educators to move in lockstep with art and artists who have decided to take a more direct political path, such as those from the 1960s. Hoard was able to continue her research in South Africa in 1998 thanks to a grant through the Missouri University International Center.

In 2001, Hoard was able to see her research in South Africa culminate in an article she wrote titled "The Commodification of Art: Ndebele Women in the Stream of Change". She was interested in the similarities between South African art and art made by African diaspora, particularly abstract art. The article included some of her photography as well. She wrote about the art made by the Ndzundza Ndebele people and how their art, such as wall painting, was closely related to personal identity which had to go through changes and transformation as a result of globalization and market consumption. Through an article written in 2005, Hoard revealed that in her decade-long experience in South Africa, her original purpose of looking at diaspora art changed to a focus on the changes to and impacts on the art and lives of Ndebele people, specifically Ndebele women, due to globalization and technological advancements affecting economic survival. She published further writing and research in the following months.

Hoard also wrote a review of the exhibition catalogue for Vive Haïti! Contemporary Art of the Haitian Diaspora that same year.

In 2006, she was on a panel for a colloquium honoring Faith Ringgold that was held at Howard University. The panel she spoke on was titled "The Black Arts Movement: Pedagogical Perspectives".

In 2009, her previous work, "The Black Aesthetic", was cited in support of teaching multiculturalism in schools.

On July 26, 2013, it was announced that Hoard would become the director of the Black Studies program at the University of Missouri-Kansas City.

==== 2013–19 ====
From 2013 to 2019, she was a professor under the Department of Art and Art History as a part of the Black Studies program at the University of Missouri–Kansas City. From 2017 to 2019, she was a consultant/lead community advisor at the Nelson Atkins Museum of Art.

In 2020, Hoard worked with Vesta A.H. Daniel on an article that focused on the importance of telling Black women's stories as counter narratives. The article was in the wake of the deaths of Breonna Taylor and George Floyd. Hoard concentrated on what she called "artivism", the combination of art and activism aligned with her conception of the Black aesthetic. She says, "[a]s artivist, I understand my art creation and my lived experience as a daily political statement. There are many definitions for this concept of marrying the words artist and activist," emphasizing that art and aesthetics can help communicate energy and feelings. She names some artivists she admires, including Barbara Chase-Riboud, Nanette Carter, Faith Ringgold, Michele Wallace, Betye Saar, and her daughters Alison Saar and Lezley Saar, and Malaika Favorite. She also lists concentric circles, linear bands (stripes), diamonds, and diagonals as visual elements of a Black aesthetic.

== Artistic practice and career ==
Hoard's academic career and her career as an artist were intertwined with each other as they were closely related; she developed both simultaneously. She is primarily a painter who works with oil and acrylics, but has also expanded her practice as a multimedia artist, and has worked with oils on paper, oil pastels, mixed media paintings, watercolors, collage, silkscreen paintings, photography, and more. Her stylistic tendencies are "natural, free-form 'floatshape' in wet and dry media". She has participated in several exhibitions and galleries throughout her career.

=== Early career ===
Early in her career in the 1960s, Hoard's artwork was more figurative and minimalist. Hoard painted portraits and made drawings of African Americans, including members of the Black Panthers. After graduating from college with her BS, she won the first prize in the 1970 Missouri Colleges art contest with a portrait titled Lady in Waiting. In 1971, in addition to showing in two other exhibitions, Hoard also curated a city wide exhibition and mounted another exhibition as part of the design and installation team at the UM Alumni Museum. She also got the chance to travel to several different European countries that year in which her airplane rides of looking down at the natural shapes made by water and in nature became the inspiration for her shaped canvas paintings. Her graduate thesis show in 1972 was held off campus at Pyramid Gallery where she was able to show her shaped canvas paintings and the three-year efforts of creating a personal palette. In 1973, she moved to Harlem to live with family relatives and had a studio set up where she returned to geometric pastel art. She also got the chance to meet with other artists who were also working with shaped canvas paintings like Betty Blayton Taylor, Al Loving, and Ed Clark. Lady in Waiting also won another Missouri state contest in 1974.

Hoard felt excluded by the monolithic ideas of politics and representation of the Black radicalism at the time because it tried to establish its official aesthetics as only consisting of figurative art and she was experimenting with abstract art. Carole Boyce Davies said that the militant style of many artists and artworks of the late 1960s had a political conscious that "...collectively destroyed the tradition of the docile, colonized black, replacing it with a fiercely audacious, confrontational black. Nevertheless, many artists of the period, notably Sam Gilliam, Norman Lewis, Melvin Edwards, Richard Hunt, and Adrienne Hoard, found the official aesthetics creatively stifling and repudiated it in their work". Her paintings grew in scale and complexity of color in 1974. The following year in 1975, she would receive a CAPS Grant in Painting from the New York State Council on the Arts which allowed her to organize a four-week public seminar series in her personal loft titled "Women in the Arts". She invited the artists Valerie Maynard, Helen Evans Ramsaran, Ernestine Robinson, and Dindga McCannon to speak as presenters. She also met Al Held and Budd Hopkins that year.

Hoard said that her artworks from 1971 to 1975 explored two overlapping themes, "one..being the pursuit of lifescape; a humanistic view of landscape painting allowing the canvas to encompass the rhythmic essence of a place, its timbre of people sounds, sights, colors, and emotions; and the second theme...an exploration of a key or hieroglyphic symbol defining a 'unity of passage', which symbolically discusses an inspirational mental movement or transcendence to a higher level of consciousness or awareness by a collective body of persons at the same point in time. This key projects a way in which multitudes can pass through the power of like consciousness. After giving these two lines over into my own contained shape, I utilized this shape to open various levels and distances in space with color".

In 1976, Lois Jones Peirre-Noel mentioned her alongside artists Rose Auld and Wendy Wilson as younger Black women artists to watch.

From 1976–77, Hoard worked on a citywide mural project with her students from her class in the Department of Black Studies at Ohio State University which was written about in a New York Times article published in June 1977 where Hoard is quoted saying that art history courses at that time did not even mention Henry Tanner.

==== Studio Museum in Harlem exhibition (1977) ====
In 1977, Hoard had a one woman exhibition at the Studio Museum in Harlem where she showed her prints, paintings, both traditional rectangular paintings and shaped canvas paintings, and drawings. David C. Driskell, Lois Mailou Jones, and Melvin Edwards contributed to the catalogue. In the press release, Hoard is quoted saying, "[t]he intrigue of manipulating pure form has extended from the inner planes to the outer perimeters of the painting. I am allowing the color to create the movement and the shapes aid in the direction. Each composition captures a moment in.time/space when certain rhythms can be viewed as color assemblages before traveling on in time taking on still other configurations." exhibit's brochure". In the exhibit's brochure, Driskell wrote in the foreword that besides a search for peace, her paintings are also able to deliver "the joy of living immediately in the experience of beautiful art forms". Driskell praises the silence of Hoard's paintings and also said that Egypt, North Africa, and Central and North American architecture and decorative art can be seen in her artworks. Lois Jones Peirre-Noel, who had written about her before, also contributed writing to the brochure, acknowledging her sensitivity in responding to nature and recognizing that her approach to shaped canvas paintings is also similar to the way she approaches prints and collages. She is praised with "[s]he excells in her portrayals of birds, beasts and fish which reveal her deep mysteries and dreams which encompass them and soar to great heights of abstract expression which captivate the eye through glowing and moving shapes". Melvin Edwards observed that in Hoard's art there is a preference for variations of orange and blue with red magenta and green. Edwards also said that marine life and other life forms serve as reference for Hoard.

June Kelly in 1978 wrote that "Hoard's deep-felt need to depict the universal human desire to glorify life and the recognition of something greater than mankind is ever present the reaching, striving, the tranquility that comes with knowing oneself".

==== 1980s and 1990s ====
In 1980, before she traveled to Korea, Hoard studied television set design and promotional graphics with Keith Knore. While in Korea, in addition to being a visiting professor at other universities, she was also a visiting artist at Korean Educational Development Institute in Seoul. During her time studying in Seoul, she was influenced by Eastern philosophy. Her painting became more textural and expressionistic in color as a result, a change from flat monochromatic areas and analogous colors. Her time in Korea allowed her to explore ideas that were not about superiority or inferiority in relation to race. She used birds to symbolize freedom in the paintings she made in Korea.

About her work from 1975 and onward through 1980, Hoard said that "...my concept and perception of form has completely opened and become involved with natural, free-form 'float-shape' in wet and dry media. Each composition, whether a collage or silkscreen or shaped canvas painting, captures a moment in time/space when certain rhythms can be viewed as tonal color assemblages, before traveling on in time to take on still other configurations and messages. In these tonal shaped explorations, I am allowing the color to create the movement and the shapes to lend direction and dimension. The series have included works of art thematically concerned with original animals from the sea and air, and evidence of natural phenomena with color". In 1980, the exhibition catalog for Forever Free Art by African-American Women, 1862–1980 was published and included Hoard as one of its artists.

From 1985 to 1986, Hoard was able to develop a breakthrough in her art and her view as an artist due to a Ford-Foundation Grant she received in 1985.

In 1987, she was named as an artist in lineage with Laura Wheeler Waring alongside artists Clementine Hunter, Varnette Honeywood, and Ann Tanksley.

In 1988, she won a juried contract with Centaur Records and was able to place paintings on cover booklets for seven compact disc recordings of synchronic computer music.

Her father died in 1989 and her mother also died the next year in 1990. The deaths in her family informed her Cosmic Movements series where she wanted to find peace after tragedy and worked more on paper rather than shaped canvas. Her paintings in the '80s were had an intimate and painterly style, and were more physical and gestural, while in the '90s her paintings came to be soft, rounded, organic, natural shapes, and had smoother transitions and passages between color and forms.

In 1990, Hoard was also written about in Samella S. Lewis' book African American Art and Artists, listed in the "Symbolism: Geometric, Organic, Figurative" section of the book. Lewis wrote on how abstraction allowed Hoard more freedom in expression and that boundaries served as exploration for her. Lewis also observed Hoard's themes of nature in her artwork as respect and appreciation of nature. Hoard is quoted saying "...Internally, the change has occurred. I am into nuances; tiny color changes, softness and motion and free-form. Now I am able to make my thoughts and my expressions match. And I love it..." Lewis also noted that for Hoard, her roles as artist and educator informed and influenced each other. As an educator, Hoard said that "...Art teachers are the bottom line. If they don't teach people that there is an esthetic wealth in the community and that they should go and take advantage of the opportunities offered, a disservice is being done. The quality of life and culture is diminished". Hoard's oil pastel and watercolor artwork Le Phoenix is also reproduced in the book.

In 1991, she was reviewed in the St. Louis Post/Dispatch and quoted in an ARTnews magazine article. In 1993, she was given a paid grant for leave and was able to create shaped canvas paintings in Italy inspired by Etruscan culture for a year.

In 1995, she was included in Gumbo Ya Ya: Anthology of Contemporary African American Women Artists. It is written that concept, perception, and representation are most important for Hoard. She wants to express concepts like the kibon, "the internal meditative nature of every person", lifescape, "the rhythmic sights and colors that evoke a higher consciousness or awareness by a collective person at the same point in time", and "unity of passage". Natural phenomena, the metaphysical nature of the universe, existence of other dimensions and greater orders all also serve as inspiration for Hoard. It is also observed that the progression of materials correlated to the complexity of media and subject matter in Hoard's work.

In 1997, her Cosmic Movements: Mercury artwork was published in a French book, La femme noire americaine: aspects d'une crise d'identite by A. Mills. She was also included in the St. James Guide to Black Artists this same year, recognized for her outsider status in both mainstream art and the African-American community because of her commitment to abstract art instead of figurative or representative art which was more accepted.

The next year, in 1998, Hoard had a 22 year retrospective exhibition and self-published a catalog for it, including photo reproductions of some of her shaped canvas paintings and writing accompanying them. In the catalog, it is reiterated that Hoard focuses on the relationship of colors in her paintings and uses shaped canvas to question and play with perspective, the effect on the viewer, and its function of it in the painting itself. Abstraction and color is what Hoard uses to examine the world. Included in her February 1997–98 artist statement, she said: "Abstraction allows me the freedom of total emotional expression, but keeps my secrets. Only the colors, authentic and bold, give any indication of the depth of my feelings, the intensity of my Truth, or the Joy in my passion". She also explained that she achieved the forms of her shaped canvas paintings by manipulating the canvas' perimeter shape.

==== 2000s–present ====
Hoard would continue to show in a small number of exhibitions in the 21st century. However, in 2020, when she collaborated with Vesta A.H. Daniel on the article "Black Women’s Counter Narratives: Art and Activism in a 21st Century American Struggle", she specifically questioned "[w]hen will my own art live on large, white painted museum walls?", which was meant to address the lack of inclusion and racism that happens regularly in the US, but perhaps suggests unsatisfaction with how her career has developed.

in 2021, her painting Etruscan II from her Etruscan Voyage Series was used for the cover of Black-Native Autobiographical Acts: Navigating the Minefields of Authenticity written by Sarita Cannon.

In March 2023, she had a solo exhibition, LOVE is a Body in Motion, held by the Kansas City Artists Coalition, which featured paintings that were more figurative and representational than her shaped canvas paintings, but still had a strong focus on colors, movement, and rhythm.

== Work ==
"...her works explore the idea of color as values, those implied codes of difference whose effect on individuals is relative to their location on a scale that equates black skin with negative values. In her work abstraction based on color proves to be the archetypal American art form, a distinct mode of commentary on the narratives of dispossession inherent in racial discrimination and the contemporary attempt in American society to deny such discrimination by postulating an evasive neutrality for abstract art. Hoard subverts that attempt; her abstract paintings confront a reluctant audience with its untenable myths. They utilize color as a means of exploring entrenched codes of difference in American society and the resulting effects of racism on the African American psyche."

— Sylvester Okwunodu Ogbechie, HOARD, Adrienne (W.), Riggs, Thomas (1997), St. James Guide to Black Artists, pp. 246–48.

Hoard said that her painting Night Oasis painted in 1974 specifically is an example of her exploring the theme of lifescape and that another 1974 painting, Aurora, specifically explores the theme of "unity of passage". In Gumbo Ya Ya, her painting Roaring Pansy (1987) is listed as an example of lifescape and her painting Love Dance (1985) is listed as an example of "unity of passage". Her painting Pandora's Box (1987) is used as an example of a painting of her newly developed style that resulted from her studying in Korea with its frenzy colors and unconventional form. Fire Dove (1990) explores the concept of duality with its reds and blues. On her Tribal Birds Series (1985–86), Hoard said it explores "cultural, ritual, natural beings in flight and the 'felt' shapes evident throughout time-life, as one transverses from one moment of reality to the next".

Dana Self, curator of Kemper Museum of Contemporary Art at the time of Hoard's 22 year retrospective in 1998, said that Hoard's Etruscan Duet was specifically painted while she was in Italy studying Etruscan tomb culture and cosmology.

The Gate Mothers Series from 1998 was originally inspired by Hoard watching priestess dance while she was in Brazil, her time spent with Ndebele women, and seeing the women she spent time with visiting altars. Tradition ended up consisting of the visual, abstract, representational, spiritual, and being a woman for her. Hoard explained that these paintings from this series are a tribute to the Gate Mothers, who are a parallel to Orisha. She was interested in how African ancestry showed up in different creation stories. Hoard admired the spirits of the women she has worked with, connecting their spirits to the Gate Mothers.

Hoard's The Women of Power-Spirit Mask series her first series of painted photographs, 12 photographs printed on archival inkjet paper painted over with oil or acrylic. This sets the series apart from her shaped canvas paintings. Hoard uses the concept of masking as protection and also as dressing up to express oneself. In this series, Hoard continues to think about her travels around the world. Hoard's initial inspiration came from Gordon Parks' photograph American Gothic, Washington, D.C.. She asked a custodian in her art building to pose for her in a similar manner. In doing so, Hoard made the central subject matter about Black women. She directly talks about womenhood as a theme in the series, prompting viewers to create their own model of a powerful woman.

“LOVE is a Body in Motion” is a series of 15 painted photographs that are based on original photographs Hoard took at an annual Spring Dance Troupe at Lincoln University (MO). She explained that painting over the photographs was not her initial intention. She wanted to capture a moment in time and have the viewer to be able to connect with that moment.

=== List of known works ===
- Africa at the Equator, Trip I, acrylic on shaped canvas, 50 x 60 x 12", 1972
- Aurora, acrylic on canvas, 40 x 30 inches, 1974
- Sun Ship, acrylic on canvas, 36x48, 1975
- Natural World Series: Octo-Mag I, acrylic on canvas, 86 x 45", 1976
- Natural World Series: Love Portrait, acrylic on canvas, 87 x 45", 1977
- Solar (Gift from the Sun), shaped canvas, 96 x 48", 1977
- Lute Song, acrylic on shaped canvas, 87 x 57', 1977
- Love Portrait, acrylic on shaped canvas, 86 x 48", 1976
- Women of the Ouled Nail, acrylic on shaped canvas, 36 x 48", 1980
- Korean Impressions Series: Peaceful Peninsula, gouache on mulberry paper, 18 x 28", 1981
- Le Phoenix, oil pastel/watercolor, 28" x 34", 1988

==== Tribal Birds series ====
- Feathered Intruder, acrylic on shaped canvas, 41 x 48", 1987
- Pecking Order, 41 x 39", oil on shaped canvas, 1990
- Winged Starfighter, oil pastel, gouache, ink on rives, 34 x 28", 1985
- Grey Wing, oil pastel, gouache, acrylic on rives, 34 x 28", 1985
- When Trade Wind?, oil pastel, gouache, acrylic on rives, 34 x 28", 1985
- Fire Dove, oil pastel, gouache, acrylic, ink on rives, 34 x 28", 1986
- Passion's Dream Flower, oil pastel, gouache, acrylic on rives, 34 x 28", 1985
- Passion's Dream Flower, color lithograph, 18 x 24" (framed), 1988

==== Cosmic Movements series ====
- Calm Center, oil on d'arches, 36 x 26", 1989
- Blood Moon, acrylic on d'arches, 37 x 27", 1991
- Jupiter, acrylic on d'arches, 37 x 27", 1991
- Meteor Shower, acrylic on d'arches, 37 x 27", 1991
- Pluto Formin', acrylic on d'arches, 1991

==== Etruscan Voyage series ====
- Caiano I, acrylic on canvas paper, 32 x 42", 1993
- Caiano Sun, acrylic on canvas paper, 31 x 41", 1993
- Blues, acrylic on canvas paper, 31 x 41", 1993
- Fall Forward, acrylic on canvas paper, 31 x 41", 1993
- Green Dancer (Danzatore Verde), 26 x 36", oil on shaped canvas, 1994
- Etruscan I, oil on shaped canvas, 48 x 48", 1994
- Etruscan II, oil on shaped canvas, 48 x 48", 1994
- Etruscan Duet (Duetto Etruschi), oil on shaped canvas panels, 90 x 48", 1994
- Reclining Violet I, oil on canvas paper, 21 x 24", 1994
- Reclining Violet II, oil on canvas paper, 21 x 24", 1994
- Reclining Violet III, oil on canvas paper, 21 x 24", 1994

==== Brasil series ====
- Bahia IV: Birdwomen, oil on d'arches, 34 x 28", 1996

==== Gate Mothers series ====
- Dance Weavers 1/6, handcolored etching, 16 x 20", 1998
- Dance Weavers 2/6, handcolored etching, 16 x 20", 1998
- Dance Weavers 3/6, handcolored etching, 16 x 20", 1998
- Dance Weavers 4/6, handcolored etching, 16 x 20", 1998
- Dance Weavers 5/6, handcolored etching, 16 x 20", 1998
- Dance Weavers 6/6, handcolored etching, 16 x 20", 1998
- Dance of Innocence, oil on shaped canvas panels, 67 x 36", 1998

==== Painted Poses series ====
- Double Dutch, 2020
- Mo-licious, 2020
- Royal Dance, 2020
- Sweet Strut, 2020
- Twin Flame, 2020

==== LOVE is a Body in Motion ====
- Fire Dance, 16 x 19", 2020
- Flame Duet, 16 x 19", 2020
- The Visitation, 16 x 19", 2020
- Three Some, 16 x 19, 2022
- The Guardian, 16 x 19", 2022
- Embraced, 16 x 19", 2022
- Ancestral Soirée, 16 x 19", 2022
- Four Hand Play, 16 x 19", 2023
- The Chase, 16 x 19", 2023

== Awards and honors ==
- Who's Who in American Art, 1978
- International Who's Who of Women, 1978
- International Who's Who in Community Service, 1976
- Outstanding Young Women in America, 1976
- Grant, New York State Council on the Arts, 1974–75
- Who's Who Among Students in American Colleges and Universities, 1970
- 10th Julia Margaret Cameron International Award for Women Photographers, (finalist in portrait category), 2016
- 12th Julia Margaret Cameron International Award for Women Photographers, (finalist in daily life & culture category), 2018
- 13th Julia Margaret Cameron International Award for Women Photographers, (honorable mention in 4 categories) 2019
- 14th Julia Margaret Cameron International Award for Women Photographers, (honorable mention in culture category) 2020

== Exhibitions ==
- Aames Gallery, Hardedge 75, Soho, New York City (group exhibition), 1975
- Artforce Gallery, Columbus, Ohio (one-woman exhibit, lecture, and workshop), 1976
- The Studio Museum in Harlem, New York City (one-woman exhibit and lecture), 1977
- Black Artists Together, Invitational Exhibition, Columbus, Ohio, 1978
- Ohio State University, Newark Campus (one-woman exhibit and lecture), 1979
- Chi-Wara Gallery, Atlanta, (group exhibition), April 16 – May 7, 1980
- Shelton Gallery, New York City (one-woman exhibition), April 3 – May 10, 1980
- International Communication Agency Exhibition Hall, American Embassy, Korean Impressions: Painting and Photography, Seoul (one-woman exhibition), April 16–30, 1981
- Illinois State University Gallery, Joslyn Art Museum (Omaha, NE), Montgomery Museum of Fine Art (AL), Gibbs Art Gallery (Charleston, SC), University of Maryland College Park Art Gallery, Indianapolis Museum of Art (IN), Forever Free: Art by African-American Women, 1862–1980 (traveling group exhibition), January 30, 1981 – February 15, 1982
- The Schomburg Center for Research in Black Culture Art Collection, New York City (group exhibition), February 19 – March 11, 1982
- Ralston Purina Corporate Headquarters Gallery, St. Louis (MO) (featured artist of group exhibition), October 3–19, 1983
- Nexus Galleries. Atlanta (group exhibition), August 2–28, 1984
- The Woman's Bank (New York City), Cinque Gallery Group Exhibition, April 4 – May 11, 1985
- Evanston Art Center (IL), Roots: A Contemporary Inspiration (group exhibition of African American artists), February 14 – March 30, 1986
- Louisiana State University Union Gallery, Faculty Exhibitions, 1986–88
- Southern University, John B. Cade Gallery (two-person exhibition), Lavergne-Hoard, October 9–26, 1987
- Dillard University, Will Alexander Gallery (two-person exhibition), Lavergne-Hoard, February 7–26, 1988
- New Orleans General Hospital (one-woman exhibition), February 2–28, 1988
- University of Missouri George Caleb Bingham Gallery, Faculty Exhibitions, 1988–98
- Manhattan East Gallery of Fine Art (New York City), Women in Color (international group exhibition), March 16 – April 16, 1989
- Fontbonne College Gallery (St. Louis), Cosmic Movements (one-woman exhibition), December 1–21, 1991
- Portfolio Gallery (St. Louis), Visions 1992 (group exhibition), February 10 – March 20, 1992
- Columbus Museum of Art (Ohio), People, Places and Things: An African American Perspective, September 5, 1992 – February 28, 1993
- Hotel Park Palace (Florence, Italy), Etruscan Voyage, (one woman exhibition), April 9–17, 1994
- George Caleb Bingham Gallery (University of Missouri), Etruscan Voyage Faculty Leave Exhibition, August 28 – September 9, 1994
- Missouri University Ellis Library Galleries Not Your Typical Tuscan: An African American Perspective on Italy, (one woman exhibition), February 1–28, 1996
- Museum of Science & Industry, Chicago, Black Creativity, January 26 – February 28, 1996
- Lincoln University Memorial Hall Gallery (MO), Soweto to Salvador: Paintings and Photography (one woman exhibition), October 13 – November 22, 1996
- Margaret Harwell Art Museum (MO), African Odyssey (two-person exhibition), February 8 – March 2, 1997
- Bruce R. Watkins Cultural Center Gallery (Kansas City), Two Decades of Float Shapes: A 22 Year Retrospective of Shaped Canvas Paintings (one-woman exhibition), March 8 – April 4, 1998
- Georgetown University, The Atrium Gallery at the Lombardi Center (Washington, D.C.), Two Decades of Float Shapes: A 22 Year Retrospective of Shaped Canvas Paintings (one-woman exhibition), April 30 – May 29, 1998
- National Museum of the American Indian, Smithsonian Institution, Washington, D.C., IndiVisible: African-Native American Lives in the Americas, 2009–2016
- George Caleb Bingham Gallery, University of Missouri, Colombia, MO, 50 Years of Civil Rights: The Movement in Expressive Images (two-person show), January – February 2014
- 4th Berlin Biennale of Fine Art and Documentary Photography, Unter den Linden, Berlin, Germany, 2016
- Dean's Gallery, Miller Nichols Library, University of Missouri-Kansas City, Inside the Art World of Adrienne Walker Hoard, January–May 2017
- 5th Foto Biennale of Fine Art and Documentary Photography, Space Nau Bostik, Barcelona, Spain, 2018
- 6th Foto Biennale of Fine Art and Documentary Photography, Space Nau Bostik, Barcelona, Spain, 2019
- Worldwide Photography Gala Awards, FotoNostrum Gallery, Barcelona, Spain 2020
- The Box Gallery, Kansas City, Painted Poses, September 4, 2020 – October 30, 2020
- Kansas City Artists Coalition, LOVE is a Body in Motion, March 2023
