= 2015 Pan American Games opening ceremony =

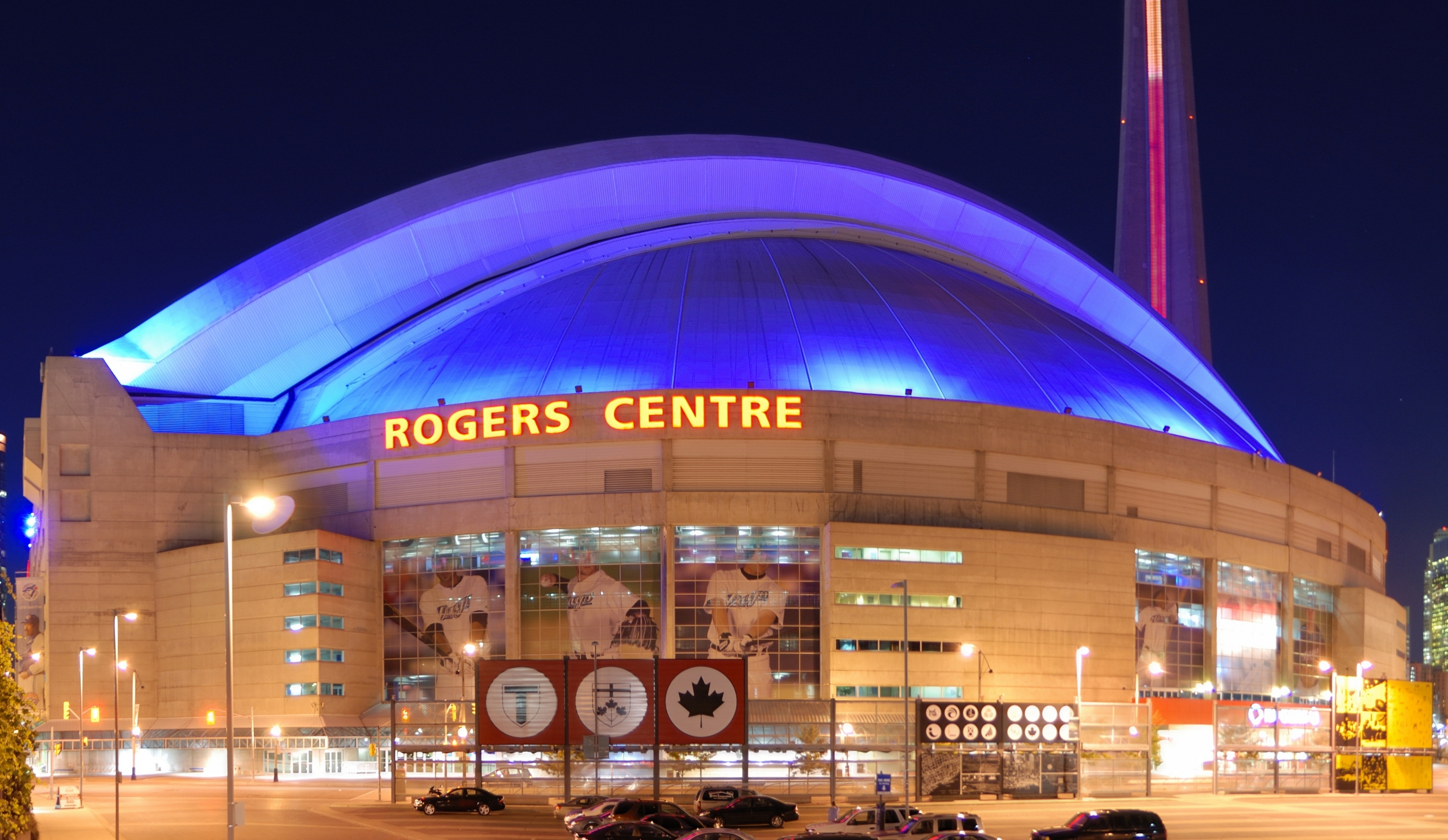
The Rogers Centre (Pan Am Ceremonies Venue) hosted the opening ceremony

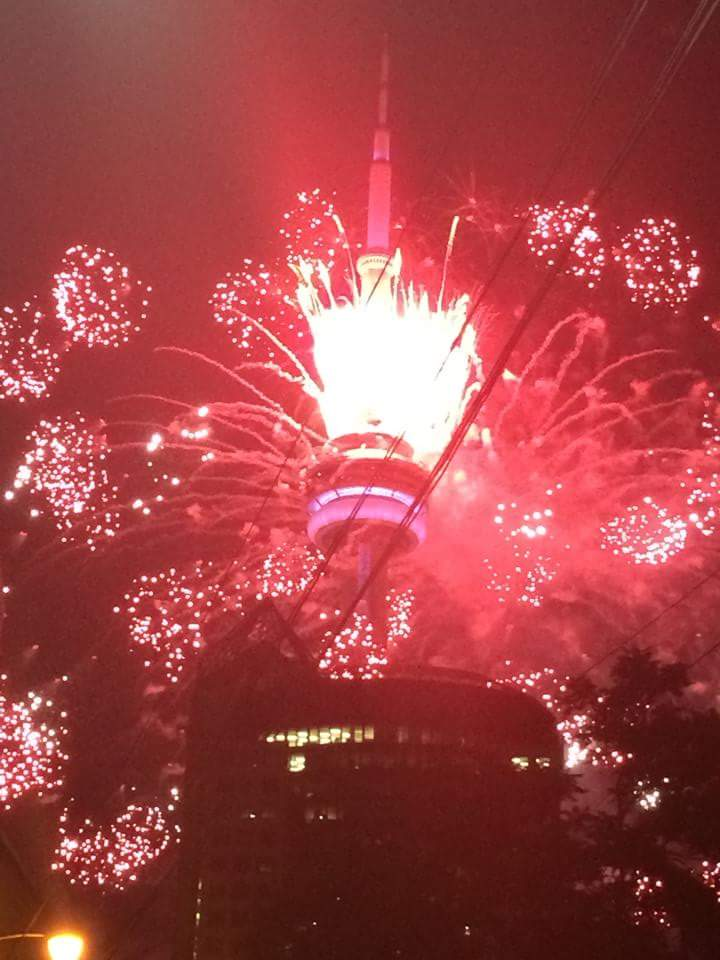
CN Tower during the opening ceremony

The opening ceremony of the 2015 Pan American Games took place on Friday July 10, 2015, beginning at 8:00 p.m. EDT at the Rogers Centre (Pan Am Dome) in Toronto, Ontario, Canada. The opening ceremony was produced and directed by Cirque du Soleil. The production was the largest event produced by the company ever, and cost approximately $30 million CAD to produce.

An audience of 45,000 was in attendance at the venue (sold-out crowd). There were 625 performers from 25 nationalities.

The tickets for the ceremony ranged between CA$100 and CA$350. It was later announced in January 2015 that tickets to the ceremony were sold out.

== Synopsis ==
The cultural segments of this opening ceremony were themed around the journey and aspirations of an athlete, from their dreams, to reality. The stage was an 85 x 85 diamond-shaped stage surrounded by four island 20 x 20 stages. Directly behind the stage were five spaced 22 x 40 Strong MDI screens hung side-by-side to form a 126 x 40 surface for video.

=== The Awakening of the Land ===
The ceremony began with 20 performers representing the Four Ancestral Nations (and four seasons) of the Greater Golden Horseshoe region: Mississaugas of the New Credit First Nation (four members move to the corners of the island, surrounding a shaman holding an eagle staff. They perform a ritual as an echo to the central indigenous concept of the four directions. It is autumn), Métis Nation of Ontario (a traditional scene where two men return from a fur hunt in a canoe, with snow and fog in the background. Three women welcome them with a celebration dance. It is winter), Six Nations of the Grand River (they enact the sky woman creation story. It is spring) and Huron-Wendat Nation (three women are growing food, two men give them shell necklaces and surrounding them is a wheat field. It is summer). Each ancestral nation was set on one of the four islands, which symbolizes the four directions. The stadium represented a womb, where tradition says indigenous people learn drumming from their mother's heartbeats. These drumbeats announce the arrival of the eagle.

=== The Countdown ===
The eagle must take human form to impart its vision. The metamorphosis is completed in a precipitous plunge from the heavens, and the Messenger stands ready to channel the mystical conversion of dreams into reality. This scene symbolized the arrival of a character known as "The Messenger", and each countdown number had a meaning. Each number was highlighted by fireworks on the islands, with numbers between 2 and 0 being from the bridge.

- 9 is a fetus
- 8 is the symbol for infinity
- 7 stands for the 7 days of the week
- 6 represents the 6 Canadian time zones
- 5 refers to the Canadian 5 cent coin (nickel)
- 4 is for the four seasons
- 3 shows the steps on the Pan Am Games podium
- 2 is the peace sign
- 1 and 0 refer to the Messenger.

=== PowWow! Carnival ===
This was a dance segment reflecting Toronto's multiculturalism and the aboriginal peoples of the Golden Horseshoe region, set to music by DJ Shub (formerly of electronic music group A Tribe Called Red). and also included 183 dancers representing various cultures (such as Hawaii, Brazil, Ukraine, Madagascar and Thailand among others) and 21 dance groups.

=== The Vision ===
In a pre-recorded segment, the Pan-American Games Torch was relayed to the stadium through Toronto neighbourhoods by Canada's gold-medal winning 4 × 100 m relay team from the 1996 Summer Olympics, culminating with a scene depicting Bruny Surin passing the flame to Donovan Bailey on the CN Tower's EdgeWalk, and then parachuting onto the stadium roof. Bailey was then lowered into the stadium with the torch, and passed it to future athlete, diver Faith Zacharias, who placed the torch on a stand to serve as a focal point for the remainder of the ceremony. The dance groups then broke out into the dance again and exited the stage as one. Following this the president of the Pan American Sports Organization, Julio Maglione and Governor General David Johnston were introduced and entered the box of honour officially.

=== Raising of the Canadian flag & playing of the national anthem ===
The Canadian flag was carried by members of the Royal Canadian Mounted Police. The Canadian national anthem "O Canada" was performed by Véronic DiCaire and Chilly Gonzales, accompanied by the Toronto Symphony Orchestra (nearly 80 musicians). They were directed by Peter Oundjian.

=== Parade of nations ===
As each nation entered, the music reflected the traditional instruments and melodic styles of each of the forty-one countries and territories. Silhouettes portraying the five disciplines of the pentathlon appear in the distance to honour their entrance (javelin, long jump, wrestling, discus and running), where the first multi sport games and the Pan American Games grew from their foundations. Each nation was preceded by a placard bearer holding a high-tech LED Device which flashed the name of each participating team in the three languages (Spanish and English), official languages of the Pan American Sports Organization, along with French, the second official language of Canada after English.

=== Entrance of the Heralds ===
Sixteen acrobats and 100 athlete marshals participated in this segment, which paid tribute to the history of communication in Canada. The heralds symbolized the country’s ongoing efforts to overcome barriers to communication. The ear, mouth, and nose emblems worn by the performers referenced technologies that contributed to Canada’s development during a period when the population was sparse and geographic obstacles were significant.

During the procession beneath the United We Play! banner the official motto of the Games, also displayed in French (Jouons Unis!) and Spanish (¡Unidos Jugamos!) the heralds encouraged spectators to recognize the contributions of the volunteers and staff involved in organizing the event. They also activated LED lights attached to the athletes’ shoulders, integrating them into the performance through the use of PixMob technology.

=== The Birth of the Twin Fires ===
The Messenger returns to the stage and reveals the Twin Fires that the Pan American Games flame shelters: The Fire of Dreams and the Fire of Reality. Together, they represented the hopes and achievements of each human and every career in sport: trials and achievement, disappointments and progress, failures and victories. The Messenger transforms the symbols of pentathlon into five powerful guardians for each discipline. The creation of Twin Fires is essential as it symbolized the window that opens between dreams and reality for the duration of the opening ceremony show.

=== Forest Borealis ===
One hundred fifty children and youth were selected to perform during this segment after auditions. Six aerial performers flying up to 45 feet (14 m) high were also included in this segment. The Messenger created a primordial forest, which represents Canada. In this homage to what will eventually become Canada, four local animals (bear, caribou, woodpecker and owl), guided these one hundred fifty children along the trails of discovery, under the glow of the Aurora Borealis. Thirty-one young ballet dancers (from Canada's National Ballet School) later emerge from the group of children and perform down the stage.

=== The Fireline ===
Fifty-three hip hop dancers, eight tumblers (who jumped over the fire onto mats), one aerial clay juggler, two fire manipulators, and one ballet dancer (javelin) took part in this segment. The fireline used in this segment was 80 feet (24 m) long. With childhood over the Guardian of the Javelin creates a border. The age of innocence is now over and now the first test in left: overcoming obstacles. To resolve their differences, they turn to lacrosse, Canada's national summer sport and the traditional Indigenous people's peacemaker. Eventually the fire is extinguished by a water bomber (a Canadian invention).

=== Waves ===
This segment sees the heralds from earlier paying their respects to Canadian Broadcasting pioneer Reginald Fessenden. Using radio waves and a jukebox a melody of Canadian love songs are played to the crowd along with two other songs (a famous song of Cirque du Soleil and the official song of the Games).

- Love Will Save the Day – David Usher
- S'il suffisait d'aimer – Celine Dion
- I Will Remember You – Sarah McLachlan
- Alegría – Cirque du Soleil
- L'Aveu – Garou
- Together We Are One – Serena Ryder (Official song of Toronto 2015 Pan Am Games)

=== Hearts of bloom ===
This segment saw 40 dancers and 7 aerialists. This segment represented the changing season, and the Guardian of the Long Jump performs aerial contortions up to 40 feet in the air. This segment represents the biggest leap in adolescent life, the discovery of love. A 100 feet (30 m) diameter mountain made of fabric panels to look like snow that melts into spring (to represent the changing seasons). Suddenly three straps are released and out of nowhere appeared three pairs (a man and woman, two men and two women) to represent the diversity of recognized forms of love in Canada. The dancers were from the Toronto Dance Theatre and Canada's National Ballet School.

=== Storm of Possibilities ===
15 dancers, 6 acrobats (who perform on 30 feet high ladders), 1 hand balancer and the Guardian of wrestling (who is a capoeira dancer and acrobat) were in this segment. This segment represents the doubt humans face in life. The Guardian leads young adults into his own inner struggle. They drew on the courage and find the self-confidence to make the right choice as the sky is raining professions (costumes of a range of opportunities in Canada rain down) and exposing a world of opportunities. Canadian choreographer Christopher House directed the dance portion of this segment.

=== Train for life ===
The train represented the railroad that stretches Canada and touches all territories and people (and uniting them). This is the moment when young adults leave home to forge their own paths. The Heralds build the station of farewells and track to our dreams. The railway also represents the journey of all athletes who left home that led them to the ceremony. The railway was built using the ladders from the previous segment. A train appears and the dancers run to jump abroad.

=== Trailblazing ===
This segment features the guardian of the discus (who is a freestyle frisbee champion), 3 aerial bungee artists, 19 dancers (two of which have disabilities), 10 BMX and mountain bike riders and 2 flatlands (the BMX solos on the main stage). The BMX and mountain bike tracks are 500 feet (150 m) long and composed of 9 modules up to 6 feet high, and total of 16 jumps. After leaving home the young athletes are blazing a trail for themselves. The Guardian of the discus is here to give them direction and he is here to hep them connect to their individual destinies and inspire them. This scene also included freestyle Frisbee, bungees, B-boy dancers, urban dancers and flatland BMX bikes.

=== The Moment of truth ===
This segment saw the entrance of the Olympic and PASO flags. The PASO flag was carried by two time Olympic gold medalist speed skater, Catriona Le May Doan, CEO of Amanda's Lemonade Stand, Amanda Belzowski, Canada's man in motion Rick Hansen, two time Olympic medalist in triathlon, Simon Whitfield, author Jewel Kats, sporting excellence and community leader Pinball Clemons, advocate for refugees Loly Rico and Canada's most celebrated baseball player Fergie Jenkins.

The Olympic Flag was carried by author of Life of Pi: Yann Martel, the most decorated Canadian athlete in history Chantal Petitclerc, astronaut Chris Hadfield, Canadian hockey legend Bobby Orr, co-founder of the Aboriginal Professional Association of Canada, Gabrielle Scrimshaw, social activist Craig Kielburger, three time Olympic rowing champion Marnie McBean and six time Stanley Cup winner Mark Messier.

After this the PASO anthem (instrumental) is played, while both flags are rose. This was followed by the athlete's oath taken by multiple Olympic medalist in trampoline Karen Cockburn and the judges oath taken by Stephan Duchesne.

Following this was the speeches by CEO of TO2015, Saad Rafi and the president of PASO Julio Maglione. In between the two speeches was a tribute to the former president of PASO (by PASO Athlete's commission head Alexandra Orlando) Mario Vazquez Raña, who died earlier in the year. After the speeches were done, Governor General David Johnston officially opened the games.

=== Building the Communities Cauldron ===
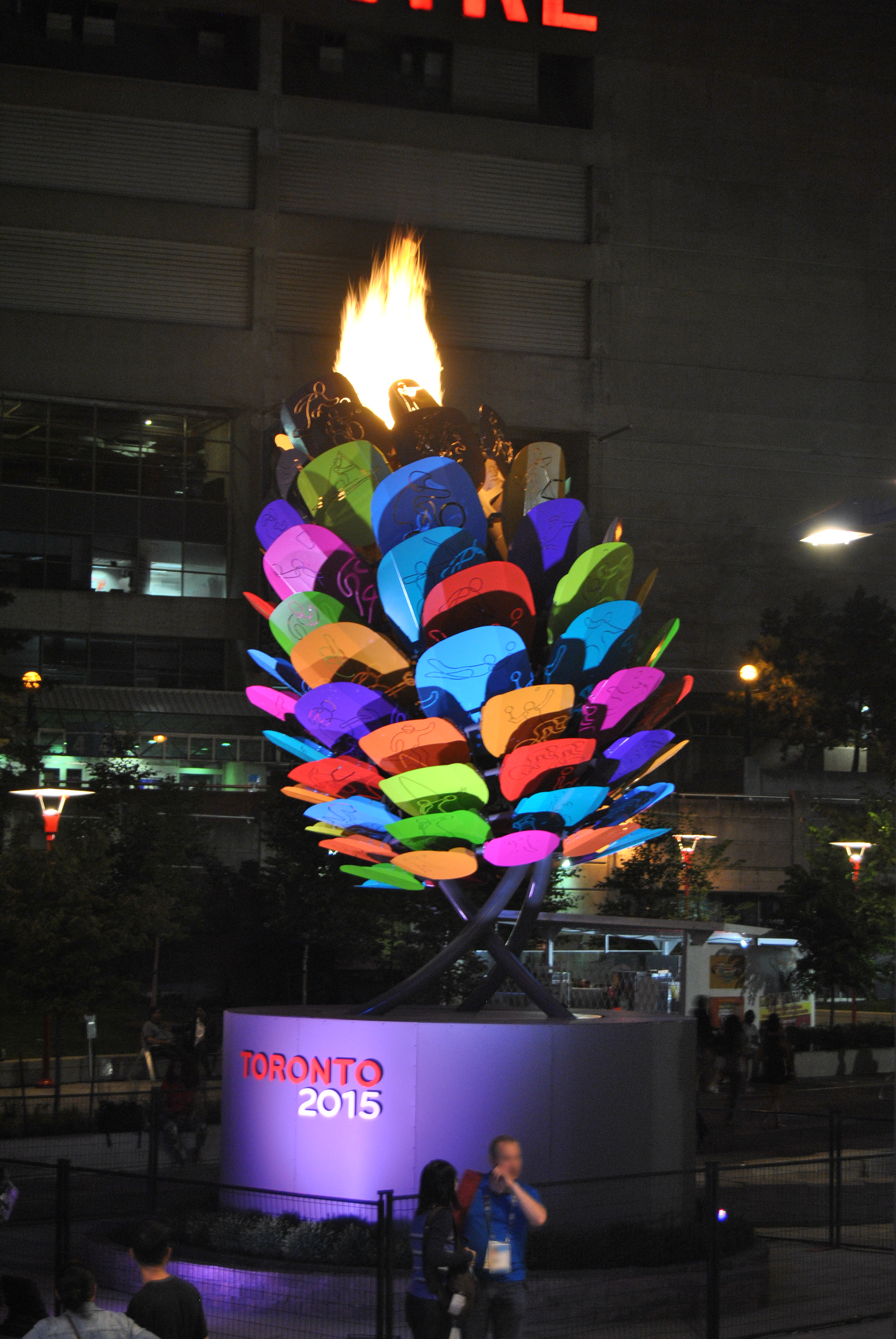
The 2015 Toronto Pan American Games Cauldron

The flags of Ontario (carried by the Ontario Provincial Police) and Toronto (carried by Toronto Police, Toronto Paramedic Services, and Toronto Fire), followed by representatives of the Boys and Girls Club of Canada (from the Braeburn community in the underprivileged part of the city, Rexdale) enter the stadium and are raised. The Cauldron is made of 66 panels (called petals), and 30 of them were assembled on the structure during the ceremony. The panels are each engraved with unique symbols designed by the 30 communities of the Greater Golden Horseshoe region.

=== Yonge Street ===
The Guardian of running features in this segment, 9 towers 32 feet (9.8 m) high, 5 aerial treadmill runners and 120 dancers and acrobats feature in this segment. The heralds enter to reveal the final destination: Toronto. A city is born and a dream is realized when destinies of thousands of athletes converge. The five treadmill runners become the five guardians and they unite. The dancers mimic the grid of the city. The 30 community leaders also install their petals onto the cauldron while this segment was going on.

=== Lighting of the Pan American Games cauldron ===
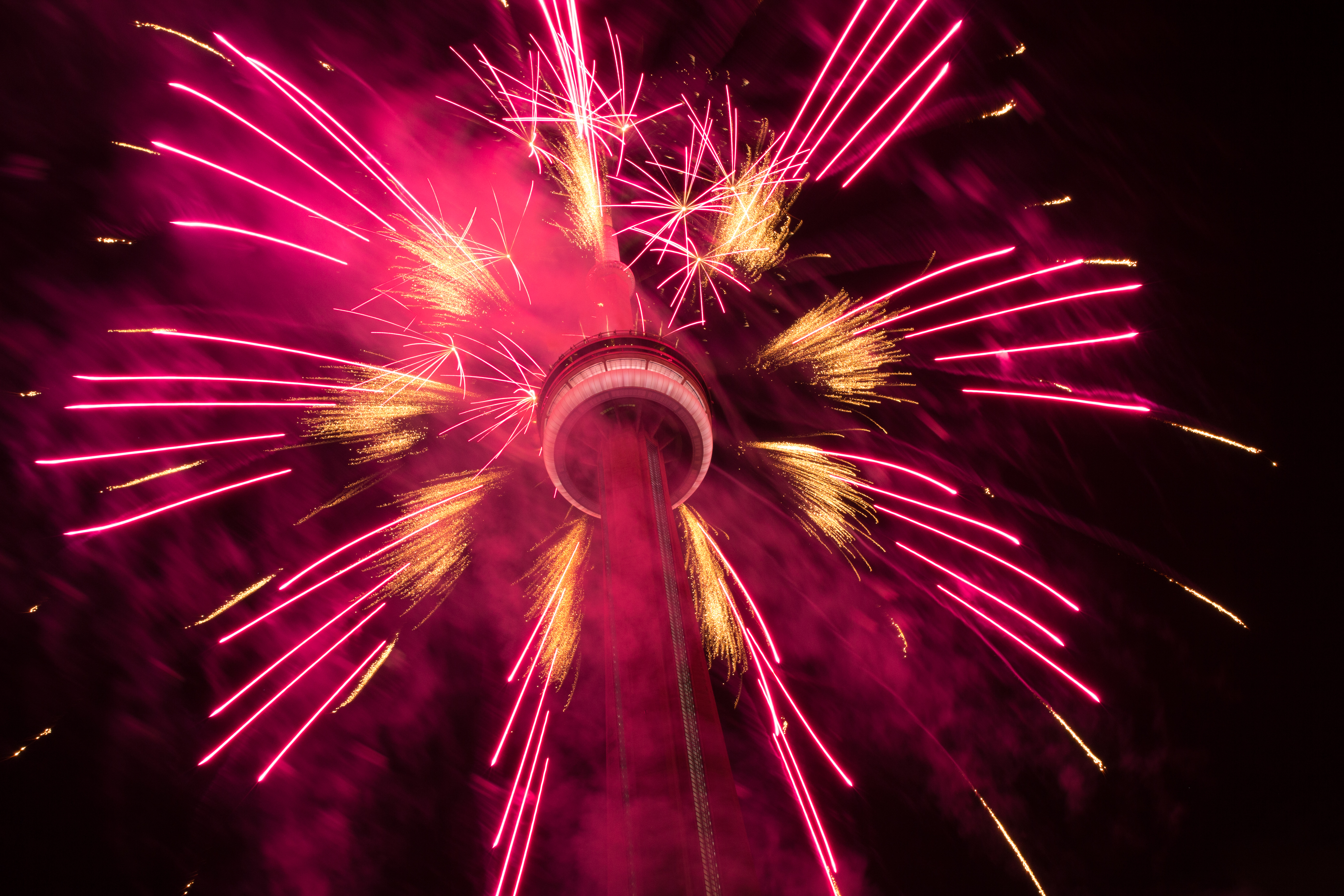
The fireworks off the CN Tower

Young diver Faith Zacharias comes on stage again and lights a new torch, and she passed it onto the members of the silver medal women's 4 × 400 m relay winning team at the 1984 Summer Olympics (in order): Dana Wright, Charmaine Crooks, Jillian Richardson, Molly Killingbeck and Marita Payne-Wiggins. Wiggins then passes of the torch to her son, NBA basketball player Andrew Wiggins. Wiggins then runs up the bleachers of the stadium to the final torchbearer retired NBA Player Steve Nash. Nash then runs outside the stadium where he ignites a bowl, which transfers the fire to the official cauldron. The ceremony concluded with a fireworks display shot off the CN Tower, and all the performers back on stage to celebrate.

== Dignitaries and other officials in attendance ==
- David Johnston, Governor General of Canada
- Stephen Harper, Prime Minister of Canada
- Kathleen Wynne, Premier of Ontario
- John Tory, Mayor of Toronto
- Bal Gosal, Minister of State (Sport)
- Thomas Bach, current president of the IOC
- Marcel Aubut, current president of the Canadian Olympic Committee
- Michael A. Chambers, former president of the Canadian Olympic Committee
- Dick Pound, Current member of the IOC (Canada) and former head of WADA.
- Gunilla Lindberg, Current member of the Executive Board of the IOC (Sweden)
- Elizabeth Dowdeswell, Lieutenant Governor of Ontario
- Michael Coteau, Ministry of Tourism, Culture and Sport (provincial), and responsible for the games.
- Julio Maglione, President of the Pan American Sports Organization and International Swimming Federation
- Ivar Sisniega, Vice President of the Pan American Sports Organization
- Keith Mitchell, Prime Minister of Grenada
