= Jewel Kelly Jr. =

American politician

Member-elect of the Missouri House of Representatives from the 106th district
- Assuming office January 6, 2027
- Succeeding: Travis Wilson

Personal details
- Born: Chicago, Illinois
- Party: Democratic
- Education: University of Illinois Urbana-Champaign; Olivet Nazarene University; Washington University in St. Louis
- Website: Campaign website

Jewel Kelly Jr. is an American politician of the Missouri Democratic Party who is the representative-elect for the 106th district in the Missouri House of Representatives. She was elected in the 2026 general election. He was a candidate in the Democratic Party primary for the 2022 United States Senate election in Missouri. Kelly is a veteran of the United States Air Force.
