= Jewel Kats =

Canadian children's author

- Born: Michelle Meera Katyal; October 24, 1978; Toronto
- Died: January 7, 2016 (aged 37); Toronto
- Education: University of Toronto; George Brown College
- Writing career
- Period: 2010-16
- Website: jewelkats.com

Michelle Meera Katyal (November 24, 1978 – January 7, 2016) was a Canadian children's author who wrote under the pen name Jewel Kats. Katyal wrote over ten books and was the inspiration for Dan Parent to create the first Archie Comics character with a disability in 2014.

== Early life and education ==
When Katyal was nine years old, she broke her leg in a car accident and resulted in having to using a wheelchair for transportation. After graduating from Milliken Mills High School, she went to the University of Toronto Mississauga and George Brown College for post-secondary studies.

== Career ==
Katyal began her career as an advice columnist for six years and obtained a scholarship from Harlequin Enterprises. After the divorce of her first husband, Katyal became a children's author.

Jewel Kats collaborated with several illustrators to bring her books to life. Claudia Marie Lenart used needle-felted wool for Hansel & Gretel: A Fairy Tale with a Down Syndrome Twist. Richa Kinra illustrated many of Jewel Kats' children's books, Cinderella's Magical Wheelchair and The Princess Panda Tea Party are to name a few. Murray Stenton worked on Miss Popular Steals the Show, while Katarina Andriopoulos contributed to DitzAbled Princess. Their work shaped the visual identity of Kats' inclusive storytelling.

After publishing her first book titled Reena's Bollywood Dream: A Story of Sexual Abuse, Katyal began an eight-book series named Fairy Ability Tales which reinterpreted fairy tales to include characters with disabilities. In 2016, Katyal's final two books Jenny & Her Dog Both Fight Cancer: A Tale of Chemotherapy and Caring and Prince Preemie were posthumously published by Loving Healing Press.

== Works ==
- Reena's Bollywood Dream: A Story About Sexual Abuse (2010)
- What Do You Use To Help Your Body?: Maggie Explores the World of Disabilities (2011)
- Cinderella's Magical Wheelchair: An Empowering Fairy Tale (2011)
- Word Search Divas (2011)
- Teddy Bear Princess: A Story about Sharing and Caring (2012)
- DitzAbled Princess: A Comical Diary Inspired by Real Life (2013)
- The Princess and the Ruby: An Autism Fairy Tale (2013)
- Snow White's Seven Patches: A Vitiligo Fairy Tale (2013)
- The Princess Panda Tea Party: A Cerebral Palsy Fairy Tale (2014)
- Miss Popular Steals the Show: Girls in Wheelchairs Rule! (2014)
- Hansel and Gretel: A Fairy Tale with a Down Syndrome Twist (2014)
- Jenny & Her Dog Both Fight Cancer: A Tale of Chemotherapy and Caring (2016)
- Prince Preemie: A Tale of a Tiny Puppy who Arrives Early (2016)

== Death ==
Katal died on January 7, 2016, from surgical complications.

== Personal life ==
Katyal was married to her first husband in 1998 and divorced in 2008. She married her second husband in 2013 and remained married until her death.

== Awards and honours ==
After meeting Archie Comics artist Dan Parent, Katyal was the basis for the first Archie character to have a disability in 2014. The following year, Katyal took part in the 2015 Pan American Games opening ceremony.

In 2017, Loving Healing Press created the Jewel Kats Special Needs Award to honor the memory of Jewel Kats. The contest is administered by Reader Views and entrants must submit books that features a story about a child overcoming a mental or physical disability.
