= Helen Ramsaran =

American sculptor (born 1943)

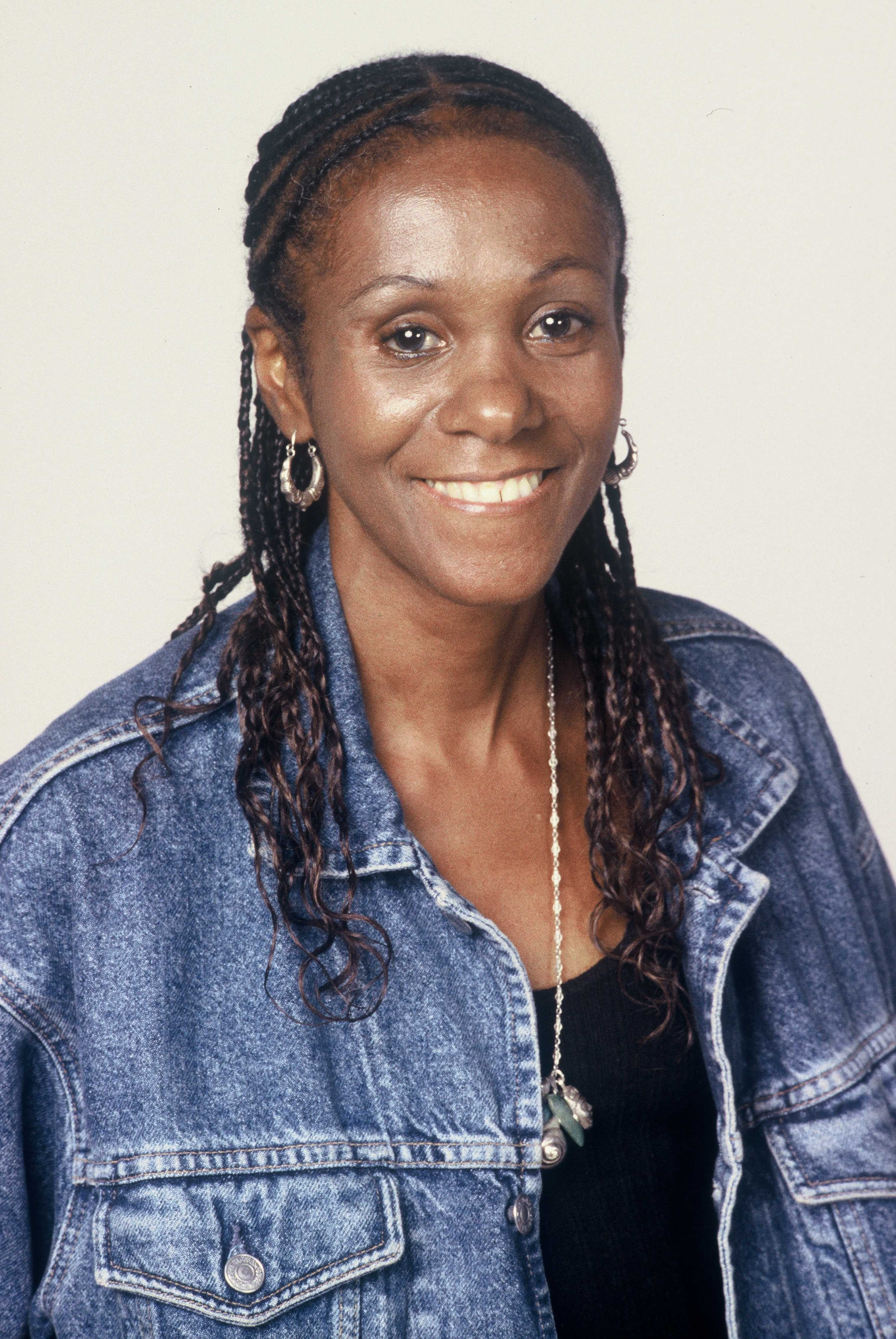
- Born: May 11, 1943 (age 83); Bryan, Texas, U.S.
- Education: Ohio State University (B.S., M.F.A.); Art Students League of New York Anatomical Drawing; 1975-1976 The New School for Social Research Photography, 1966-1968
- Known for: Bronze, clay, and encaustic sculpture, papermaking
- Website: www.helenevansramsaran.com

Helen Evans Ramsaran (born May 11, 1943) is an American sculptor. Her work explores the primordial world of ancient rituals, mysterious fossilized remains, mystic forces, and African inspired architecture. Ramsaran's work was first inspired by a trip to Africa in 1981, and although her sculpture is inanimate, there is a lurking sense of humanity's presence. Her recent work explores the effects of climate change on life sustaining systems and resources, specifically marine ecosystems and plant and animal species.

== Early life and education ==
Helen Ramsaran was born in Bryan, Texas in 1943 to parents Elizabeth and Fred Evans. She received a Bachelor of Science degree in Art Education (1965) and a Masters of Fine Art in sculpture (1968) from Ohio State University, where she studied bronze casting under David Black and welding with John Freeman. From 1968 to 1969, Ramsaran taught at Florida A&M University and later at Bowie State University in Maryland from 1970 to 1973. She studied photography at the New School for Social Research in New York (1973–74), and anatomical drawing at the Art Students League in New York from 1975 to 1976. Ramsaran retired as an associate professor of art at John Jay College of the City of University of New York in 2008.

== Career and artistic style ==
Ramsaran moved to New York City in 1973. Shortly thereafter (1978), she created a series of bronze relief sculptures called Visual Tales. This is her only series that is autobiographical in its statement and assumes the form of a visual narrative. The images and forms are somewhat calligraphic, thus posing some very delicate and challenging casting problems. In executing this body of work at the Johnson Atelier Technical Institute of Sculpture in Princeton, New Jersey, Ramsaran was able to perfect the technique of casting very delicate bronze sculptures.

Ramsaran's bronze sculptures were typically small-scale compositions that occasionally featured multiple figures. Her delicate and fluid bronze technique is exemplified in her 1976 sculpture, Survivors. The work is small (15 x 15 x 14 inches) and shows three thin, elongated, and curved figures planted to the base of undulating surfaces that is fixed to a wooden plank. The emaciated and abstracted figures effectively convey Ramsaran's social message that is “the plight of the poor and starving and their struggle against the manipulative forces that oppress them." Speaking about this piece, Ramsaran said it "was not an easy one to create, but I felt that it was a necessary one”. Her motivation came from a New York Times article that proposed some countries in the Sahel region may always struggle despite food aid, suggesting to prioritize economically resourceful countries for significant food supplies while considering alternative approaches for the more challenging cases, resembling the principle of triage. Ramsaran said, "I was enraged because I have seen so many economically deprived people survive by sheer determination and pride, and for that reason I would never entertain the notion of writing anyone off. Therefore I created this sculpture for all of those people who have been written off and yet managed to survive." The elongated forms and their spatial interplay also evoke the artistic style of Giacometti, who drew inspiration from African sculptural design principles.

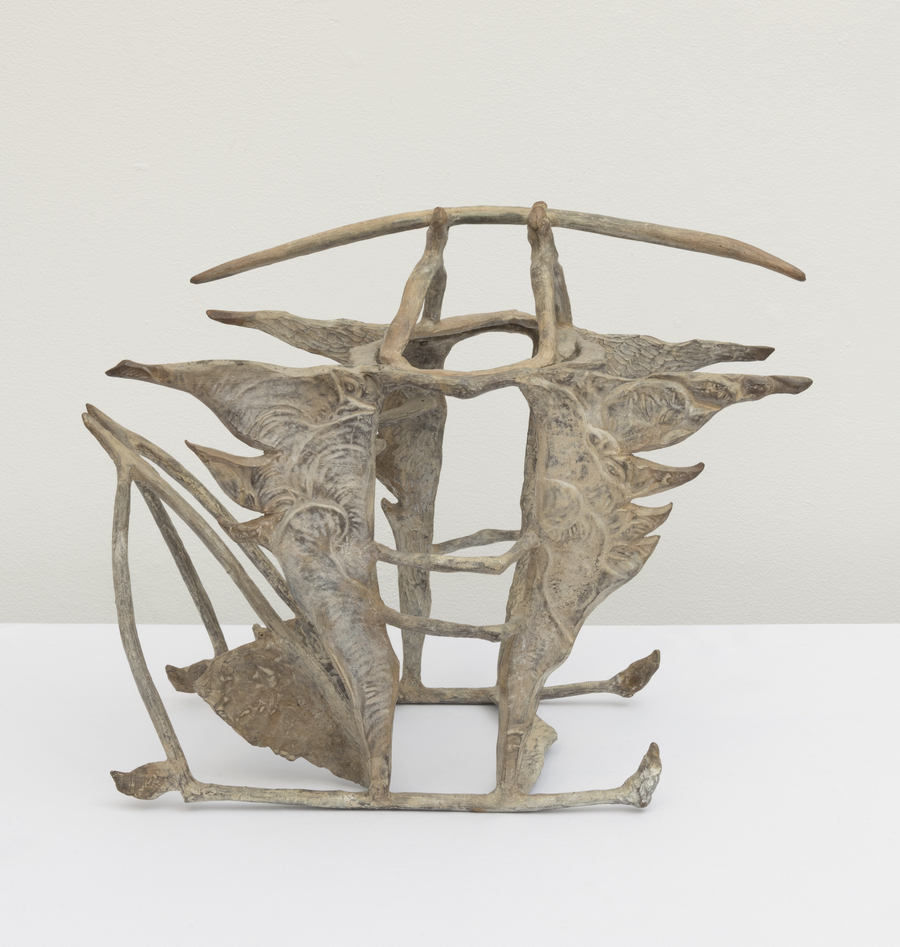
Legacy from Olduvai, bronze, 1990, 16 x 8 x 12 inches, (Image Courtesy of Welancora Gallery and the Artist, Photography by Adam Reich)

In the 1980s, Ramsaran's work took a major shift and developed into an exploration of ancient rituals, ancient African oral traditions, ancient myths, mysterious fossilized remains, supernatural power, and African inspired architecture. Although her sculpture during this period and beyond is inanimate, there is a lurking sense of humanity's presence. The subtle carvings on many of Ramsaran's bronze sculptures are meant to represent African scarification and elements in nature, such as lighting and rain that mark the change in planting seasons and, that speak of a lost reverence for nature and its life-sustaining power.

The research for Ramsaran's older works involved extensive travel, over a thirty-year period, throughout Africa, Europe, Mexico, China, and Japan. During the early 80's she traveled to Pietrasanta in Italy where she set up a small studio and spent several months casting in bronze. A few of the most pivotal moments in her research came when she visited Mexico (1982) where she observed the ancient sculpture and architecture of the Toltecs, Mayans, Zapotecs and Aztecs; Japan (1984) where she learned the delicate art of traditional Japanese papermaking or Washi while being apprenticed to the papermaker, Hiroyuki Fukunishi; and, in Zimbabwe (1987–1988) where she created a group of twenty stone carvings and bronze sculptures called Prehistoric Stamps that suggest the prehistoric origins of seeds, fossils, animals, and the Shona, Karanga and Ndebele people of the region. The overwhelming presence of granite boulders, in Zimbabwe, adorned with prehistoric, red ochre paintings of warriors and animals would forever shape Helen's approach to her work going forward.

Similarly, after her experiences in Japan she created a series of experimental sculptures, in handmade paper called The Secret Myths. These works represent enlarged amulets inscribed with brightly colored symbols from African mythology. The Sanctuary Group consists of a series of large bronze sculptures informed by an age-old initiation ritual of the Poro and other associations, which takes place in the deep sacred grove of trees in the Ivory Coast. These works were included in Ramsaran's solo show at the Chrysler Museum of Art and the Studio Museum in Harlem. Ramasran's extensive research on the Dogon sacred sites in Mali informs her series of bronze sculpture that investigates the idea of the shrine as an actual place of refuge for the living and the deceased. This exploration into the idea of "house" was also an outgrowth of Ramsaran's research on African cosmology especially in the construction of houses.

In 1998, Ramsaran produced an art work entitled Kuca: A Well Worn Path. This path measured approximately 125 feet long and 18 to 24 inches wide and was composed of approximately 100 bronze segments linked together to form a serpentine design. In the language of the Batammaliba people, kuca refers to a path, often associated with the concept of a place. Ramsaran comments on the profound multi-layered meaning this word holds in relationship to her sculptures:

As a sculpture, the idea of the path and the way it evolves intrigues me. While we are familiar with paths and have probably contributed to forming numerous paths in nature, it is a path, as it is understood in the metaphysical sense, which inspires me more as an artist. Perhaps, it is because the meaning is a bit more elusive, inviting complex expressions and is open to multiple levels of interpretations.

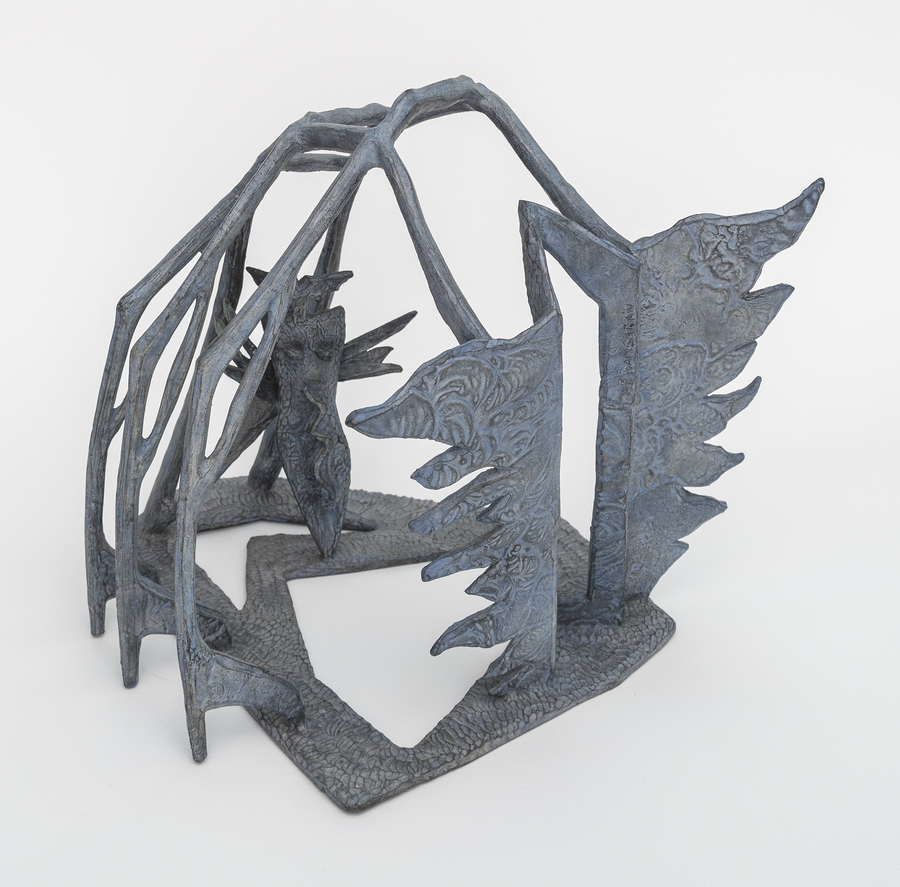
Shrine of the Arrowhead Women, bronze, 1992, 13 x 15 x 14 inches, wb, (Image Courtesy of Welancora Gallery and the Artist, Photography by Cary Whittier)

According to Suzanne Preston Blier, The Anatomy of Architecture, "Paths constitute a frequently used metaphor in the Batammaliba ceremony and thought. Paths are commonly used to refer to the idea of destiny (one's path in life), are closely identified with the idea of history (a path through time), are employed as a frequent reference to identity (each person follow his or her own distinct path), and are often used to suggest proper conduct (the correct path of behavior). In local ritual (among the Batammaliba) and symbolic contents, the path is seen to be that element that distinguishes and gives identity (a sense of place) to all living forms."

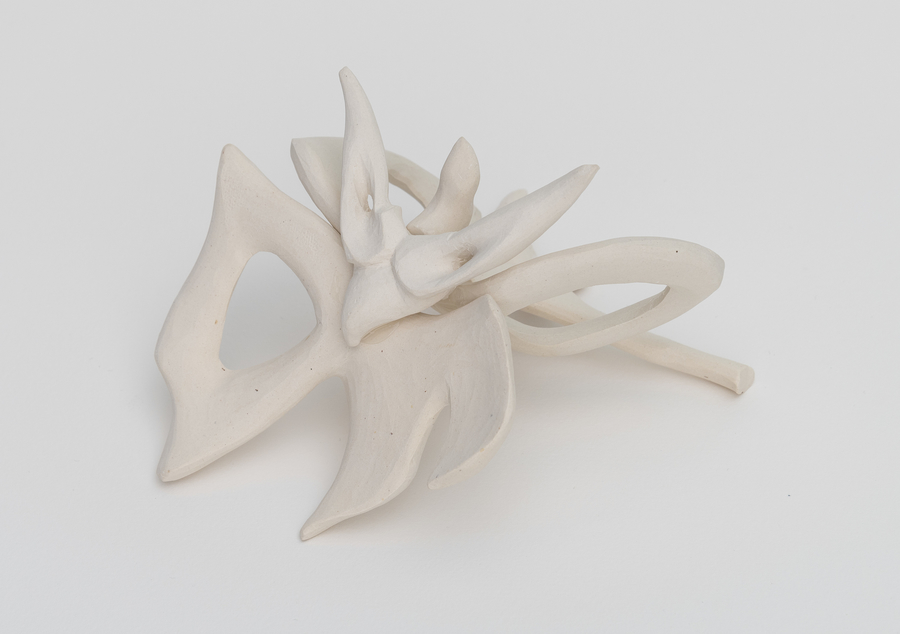
Ghost Species, 2019, Carved Clay, 6 x 8 inches. (Image Courtesy of Welancora Gallery and the Artist, Photography by Cary Whittier)

Ramsaran's recent series, executed in carved white clay, is not as intricate as the earlier works but they still communicate the same sophistication and physical tension. These pieces are intended to represent the dying off of the coral reef and other life-sustaining systems due to the effects of climate change.

=== Solo exhibitions ===
==== 2017 ====
- "Extinction: Signals of Alarm", Kenkeleba Gallery, New York, New York

==== 2010 ====
- "A Significant Find", Maplewood Art Center, Maplewood, New Jersey

==== 2002 ====
- "Dwellings: Real and Imagined", American Museum of Natural History, New York, New York.

==== 2001 ====
- "The Spirit of a Woman", Cinque Gallery, New York, New York

==== 1998 ====
- "Pathways and Shelters", Wilmer Jennings Gallery, New York, New York

==== 1994 ====
- "Helen Evans Ramsaran", Solo Exhibition, Chrysler Museum of Art, Norfolk, Virginia
- "Helen Evans Ramsaran", Solo Exhibition, Studio Museum in Harlem, New York, New York

==== 1992 ====
- "Touchstones of Grace", Hughley Gallery, Atlanta, Georgia

==== 1988 ====
- "Le Contes Visuels", La Fourmi Ailee Galerie, Paris, France

=== Selected two-person exhibitions ===
==== 2002 ====
- "Windows of the Soul: Phoebe Beasley and Helen Ramsaran", Stella Jones Gallery, New Orleans, Louisiana

==== 1996 ====
- "Masami Aihara and Helen Evans Ramsaran", Atagoyama Gallery, Tokyo, Japan

=== Group exhibitions ===
==== 2016 ====
- "Essentia", Taller Boricua, New York, New York
- "Herstory", Welancora Gallery, Brooklyn, New York

==== 2014 ====
- "Art of the 5 Brooklyn", Interchurch Center, New York, NY
- "Facing the Rising Sun", Wilmer Jennings Gallery, New York, New York

==== 2013 ====
- "50 Years/50 Gifts", Sheldon Museum of Art, Lincoln, Nebraska
- "Its Surreal Thing", Sheldon Museum of Art, Lincoln, Nebraska

==== 2009 ====
- "Twin Infinities", Abrons Art Center, New York, New York

==== 2008 ====
- "African American Artists on Paper", State University of New York at Geneseo, Geneseo, New York
- "Something to Look Forward To", HUB-Robeson Galleries, Penn State University, University Park, Pennsylvania
- "Something to Look Forward To", Flint Institute of Arts, Flint, Michigan
- "Something to Look Forward To", Morris Museum of Art, Augusta, Georgia

==== 2007 ====
- "Back to the Future: Contemporary American Art from the Collection", Mead Art Museum, Amherst College, Amherst, Massachusetts

==== 2006 ====
- "Something to Look Forward To", Beach Museum of Art, Kansas State University, Manhattan, Kansas
- "Something to Look Forward To", California African American Museum, Los Angeles, California

==== 2005 ====
- "Something to Look Forward To", The Heckscher Museum of Art, Huntington, New York
- "Looking......Seeing?" Selected Alumni From the Artist-in-Residence Studio Space Program, Guest Curator, Suzanne Randolph, Abrons Art Center Gallery, New York, New York
- "Project Diversity 200", Corridor Gallery, Brooklyn, New York
- "Contemporary Women Artists: New York", University Art Gallery, Indiana State University, Terre Haute, Indiana

==== 2004 ====
- "Creating Their Own Image", Parsons Gallery, Parson School of Design, New York, New York
- "Something to Look Forward To", Phillips Museum of Art, Franklin & Marshall College, Lancaster, Pennsylvania

==== 2003 ====
- "For Love And Peace Of Mind: Contemporary Works of Art", One Good Thing Gallery, New York, New York
- "Comfort Zones: Sculptural Solutions for the Spirit", TENRI Cultural Institute of New York, New York, New York

==== 2002 ====
- "Paper 2003", Metaphor Contemporary Art, Brooklyn, New York
- "Assembly/Line: Works by Twentieth-Century Sculptors", Mead Art Museum, Amherst, Massachusetts
- "LIFE - COLOR – FORM", Gallery Brocken, Tokyo, Japan
- "Windows of the Soul", Phoebe Beasley and Helen Ramsaran, Stella Jones Gallery, New Orleans, Louisiana
- "The Belles of Amherst: Contemporary Women Artists in the Collections of the Mead Art Museum and University Gallery of University of Massachusetts Amherst", Amherst, Massachusetts
- "Helen Evans Ramsaran, Matt Burke, Eric Laxman, 2nd Annual Sculpture Show", Hopper House Art Center, Nyack, New York
- "Transversing Cultures, Observations in Time and Space", Abrons Art Center, New York, New York

==== 2001 ====
- "Nexus II: Paul Gardere, Helen Evans Ramsaran, Freddy Rodriguez", Skoto Gallery, New York, New York
- "Roots and Wings: Entitled Black Women Artists", Cinque Gallery, New York, New York
- "Renewal/Change: BWAC Outdoor Sculpture Show", Empire-Fulton Ferry, Brooklyn, New York
- "Cities and Desire", The Rotunda Gallery, Brooklyn, New York

==== 2000 ====
- "Selections", Skoto Gallery, New York, New York
- "Unbound: Reshaping Artist's Books", Abrons Arts Center, New York, New York
- "Generations II", AIR Gallery, New York, New York
- "Public Voices/Private Visions", Rockland Center for the Arts, West Nyack, New York

==== 1999 ====
- "Slave Routes: The Long Memory", Kenkeleba Gallery, New York, New York

==== 1998 ====
- "Constructions in Multiple Hues", The Painted Bride Gallery, Philadelphia, Pennsylvania

==== 1997 ====
- "Yari-Yari: Visual Verbal Connections", Wilmer Jennings Gallery, New York, New York
- "Six Sculptors", Long Island University, Brooklyn Campus, Brooklyn, New York
- "Four Women in Form", Hostos Art Center, Bronx, New York
- "Women in Full Effect", Rush Art Gallery, New York, New York

==== 1996 ====
- "Open Studios", The International Studio Program, Tribeca, New York
- "‘Til Spring Thaw: An Exhibition of Electric Environmental Works", Aquamarine Park and Sculpture Garden, New York, New York
- "Tiny Multiples", Gallery 121 Henry, New York, New York
- "African Influence/Contemporary Artists", National Civil Rights Museum, Memphis, Tennessee

==== 1989 ====
- Salon des Artistes Independents, Grand Palais, Paris France
- Prix d’Art Contemporain de Monte-Carlo, Musee Monaco, Monte Carlo, Monaco
- Group Exhibition of Sculpture, Brasil Inter-Art Galerie, Paris, France

==== 1986 ====
- "Progressions: A Cultural Legacy", MoMA PS1, New York, New York

==== 1982 ====
- The Wild Art Show", MoMA PS1, New York, New York

=== Grants ===
- 2003-04 The City University of New York Research Grant, The City University of New York Research Foundation, New York, New York
- 1996-97 The City University of New York Research Grant, The City University of New York Research Foundation, New York, New York
- 1994-95 The City University of New York Research Grant, The City University of New York Research Foundation, New York, New York
- 1993-94 The Elizabeth Foundation Grant, New York, New York
- 1985-86 The City University of New York Research Grant, The City University of New York Research Foundation, New York, New York
- 1984-85 Recipient of the Third World Artists Fellowship, New York, New York

=== Commissions, public sculptures and public projects ===
- Sheldon Museum of Art, Winged Moondance (2013)
- Brooklyn Remembers, September 11 Memorial Project. Finalist, 2003–04, Brooklyn, New York
- September 11 Memorial Project at Liberty Park, Invited Participant, 2004–05, Liberty Park, New Jersey
- Mead Art Museum, Cliff Dwellers (2002), 19" x 22" x 3", Amherst, Massachusetts
- The Brown Capital Management Co. Inc., Pathway to Home (2000), 20" x 11" x 65", Baltimore, Maryland
- Harlem School of the Arts, Dance of the Nightingales (1986), 6' x 2'x 2', New York, New York
- John Jay College, A Silent Sentinel (1985), 3' x 5' x 10', New York, New York
- John Jay College, Symbiotic Vision (1979), 22" x 18" x 4 1/2", New York, New York
- The College of Staten Island, Wisdom's Key (1976), 4' x 4' x 9', Staten Island, New York

=== Public collections ===
- Sheldon Museum of Art, Lincoln, Nebraska
- Mead Art Museum, Amherst, Massachusetts
- Brown Capital Management Company, Baltimore, Maryland
- Harlem School of the Arts, New York, New York
- John Jay College, The City University of New York, New York, New York
- College of Staten Island, The City University of New York, New York, New York
- Johnson Publishing Company, Chicago, Illinois
- Ohio State University, Columbus, Ohio
- New Museum, New York, New York
