= Jewel Amoah =

American activist

Academic background
- Education: McMaster University, University of Cape Town

Academic work
- Institutions: St. Augustine Campus of the University of the West Indies; McMaster University
- Main interests: Feminism, Intersectionality, Critical Race Theory, Feminist Legal Theory, Legal Pluralism, Human Rights

Jewel Amoah is a Feminist and Human Rights scholar, best known for her work as a human rights advocate and activist in Canada and Africa, who is Assistant Dean, Equity, Diversity and Inclusion at the Daniels Faculty of the University of Toronto. She was previously a part of the Faculty of Law at St. Augustine Campus of the University of the West Indies. Through her work as an attorney and academic, Dr. Amoah has focused on equality rights for women and children, intersectionality, and international human rights. Research interests include Feminist Legal Theory, Critical Race Theory and Legal Pluralism.

In 2022, Amoah was appointed as Assistant Dean, Equity, Diversity and Inclusion at the John H. Daniels Faculty of Architecture, Landscape and Design of the University of Toronto.

Amoah has a B.A. from McMaster University, a Common Law Degree (LL.B.) from Ottawa University, and LL.M. and Ph.D. from University of Cape Town. Her dissertation was titled “Constructing Equality: Developing an Intersectionality Analysis to Achieve Equality for the Girl Child Subject to South African Customary Law”.

== Works ==
- "Watch GRACE Grow: African Customary Law and Constitutional Law in the Garden of Equality", in Feminist Constitutionalism: Global Perspectives, Baines et al. eds. (New York: Cambridge University Press, 2012) at 357–376.
- "Religion vs. Culture: Striking the Right Balance in the Context of Traditional African Religions in the New South Africa", in Traditional African Religions in South African Law, TW Bennett, ed. (Cape Town: UCT Press, 2011) at pp. 37–62.
- "The Freedoms of Religion and Culture under the South African Constitution: Do Traditional African Religions Enjoy Equal Treatment?" (co-authored with Tom Bennett) (2008-2009) 24 Journal of Law and Religion pp. 1–20; also at: (2008) 8 African Human Rights Law Journal 357–375.
- "At the Crossroads of Equality: The Convention on the Rights of the Child and the Intersecting Identities of GRACE, An African Girl Child", in Proceedings of the Conference on the International Rights of the Child, Collins et al., eds. (Montreal: Wilson & Lafleur, 2008) at pp. 313–337.
- "Building Sandcastles in the Snow: Meanings and Misconceptions of the Development of Black Feminist Theory in Canada" in Theorizing Empowerment: Canadian Perspectives on Black Feminist Thought, Notisha Massaquoi and Njoki Wane, eds., (Toronto: Inanna Press, 2007) at pp. 95–118.
- "The World on Her Shoulders: The Rights of The Girl-Child in the Context of Culture and Identity" (2007) 4 Essex Human Rights Review 1. Mendes, Errol. Racial Discrimination Law and Practice, (Carswell: Toronto, 1999 – Release 1 Updates)
- "Back on the Auction Block: A Discussion of Black Women and Pornography" (1997) 14 National Black Law Journal 204.
- "Narrative: The Road to Black Feminist Theory", (1997) 12 Berkeley Women's Law Journal 84.

== See also ==
- Black feminism
