= Jewel Simon =

American artist

Jewel Alma Woodward Simon (July 28, 1911—1996) was an American teacher, artist, and poet.

== Early years ==
Jewel Alma Woodward Simon was born on July 28, 1911, in Houston to Rachel Lee (Williams) Woodward and Chester Arthur Woodward. She grew up in the Fifth Ward, where she studied at Crawford Elementary School and the "Old Colored High." She graduated as the class Valedictorian when she was fifteen years old. She earned a mathematics degree with honors from Atlanta University in 1930.

== Career ==
In 1931 she accepted a position as a mathematics teacher at Jack Yates High School in Houston, and shortly later was promoted to the head of the department.

In Atlanta she began art training at her home. Though she was producing paintings and sculptures, she faced obstacles as a black artist, and was not able to protect her intellectual property until 1952. She graduated with a fine arts degree at the University of Atlanta in 1967. She exhibited in traveling shows reaching Texas, California, Denmark, Sweden, Germany, the Soviet Union, and New Zealand.

== Personal life ==
Simon married Edward Lloyd Simon on February 19, 1939. They moved to Atlanta, where she became a housewife. They had two children, Ed and Margaret.
