= Foord =

Foord is an English surname, being a variant of Ford.

Notable people with the surname include:

- Alisha Foord (born 1997), Australian rugby league footballer
- Arthur Humphreys Foord (1844–1933), British palaeontologist and illustrator
- Ben Foord (1913–1942), South African boxer
- Bert Foord (1930–2001), English meteorologist
- Bill Foord (1924–2015), English cricketer
- Caitlin Foord (born 1994), Australian soccer player
- Christine Foord (1922–2015), British entomologist and photographer
- Dudley Foord (1923–2013), Australian and South African cleric
- Edward Foord (1825–1899), British Army officer and cricketer
- Ernest Foord (1883–1941), English golfer
- Gary Foord (born 1970), British cyclist
- Heather Foord (born 1965), Australian journalist
- Hugh Foord (born 1929), English long-distance runner
- Matthew Foord (born 2006), New Zealand soccer player
- Richard Foord (born 1978), British politician
- Sophia Foord (1802–1885), American educator and activist
- Stu Foord (born 1985), Canadian football player

Foord may also refer to:

- Foord Asset Management, a South African asset management firm

== See also ==
- Foord-Kelcey, a surname
- Forde (disambiguation)
- Ford (disambiguation)
