= Foord-Kelcey =

Foord-Kelcey may refer to:

- Alick Foord-Kelcey (1913-1973), Royal Air Force officer
- John Foord-Kelcey (1860–1931), English cricketer
- William Foord-Kelcey (1854–1922), English barrister, academic and cricketer

== See also ==
- Kelcey (disambiguation)
- Foord
