= General Ford (disambiguation) =

Stanley H. Ford (1877–1961) was a Lieutenant General in the United States Army. General Ford may also refer to:

- Elbert L. Ford (1892–1990), U.S. Army major general
- James Hobart Ford (1829–1867), Union Army brevet brigadier general
- John Salmon Ford (1815–1897), Confederate States Army brigadier general
- Richard Ford (Royal Marines officer) (1878–1949), Royal Marines general
- Robert Ford (British Army officer) (1923–2015), British Army general who was Adjutant-General to the Forces

== See also ==
- Edward Foord (1825–1899), British Army lieutenant general
- Attorney General Ford (disambiguation)
