= Osbert Mordaunt =

Osbert Mordaunt is the name of two first-class cricketers:

- Osbert Mordaunt (cricketer, born 1842) (1842–1923)
- Osbert Mordaunt (cricketer, born 1876) (1876–1949)
