= Jeff Yorga =

Canadian football player (born 1981)

No. 58
- Position: OL

Personal information
- Born: October 31, 1981 (age 45); Moose Jaw, Saskatchewan
- Listed height: 6 ft 7 in (2.01 m)
- Listed weight: 290 lb (132 kg)

Career information
- College: University of Regina

Career history
- 2006–2007: Toronto Argonauts

Jeff Yorga (born October 31, 1981, in Moose Jaw, Saskatchewan) was a Canadian Football League offensive lineman for the Toronto Argonauts. He was signed as a free agent by the Argonauts on February 21, 2006. Prior to joining the Argonauts, Yorga played for the University of Regina Rams and the Regina Thunder.
