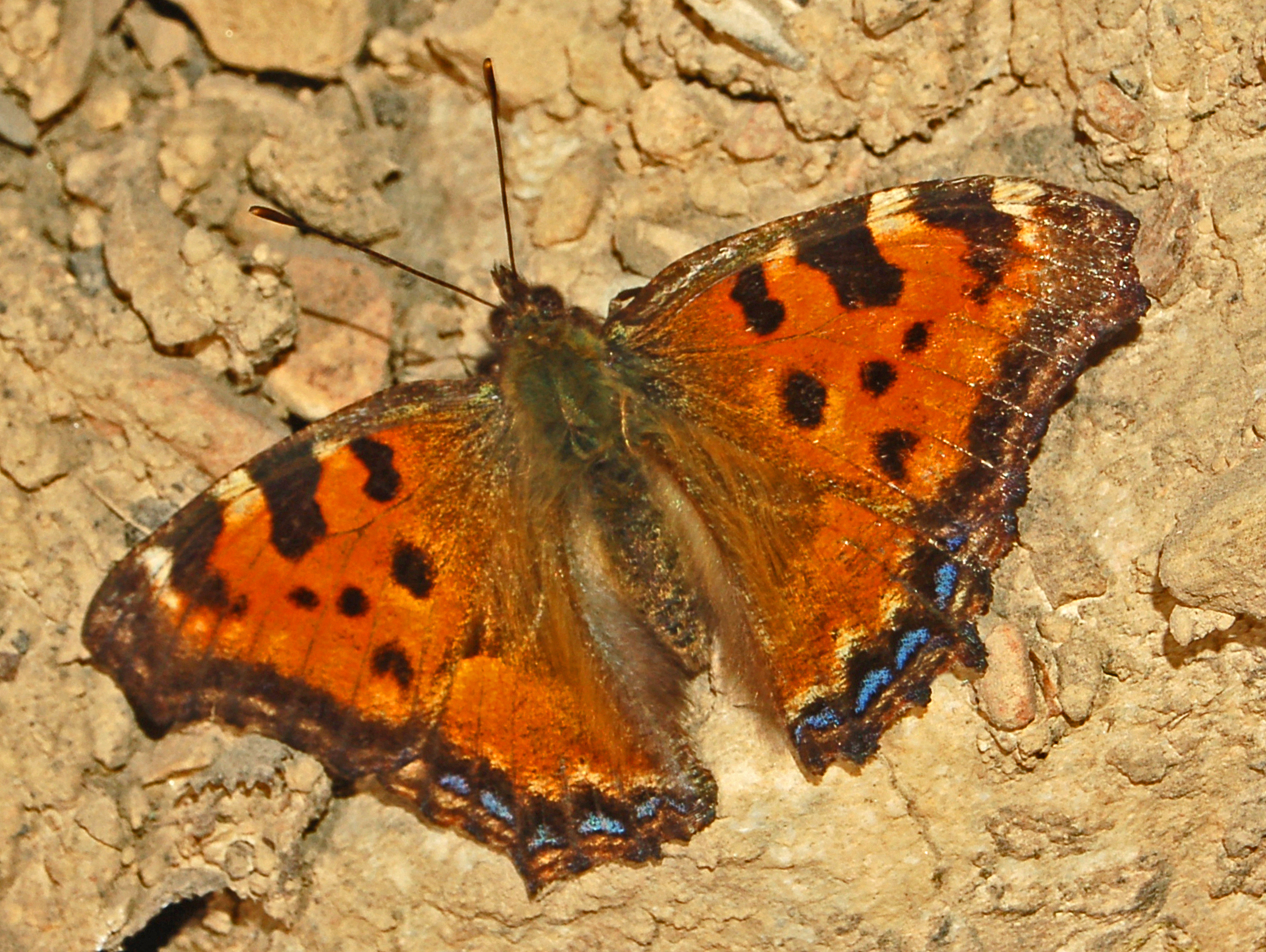
- Upperside
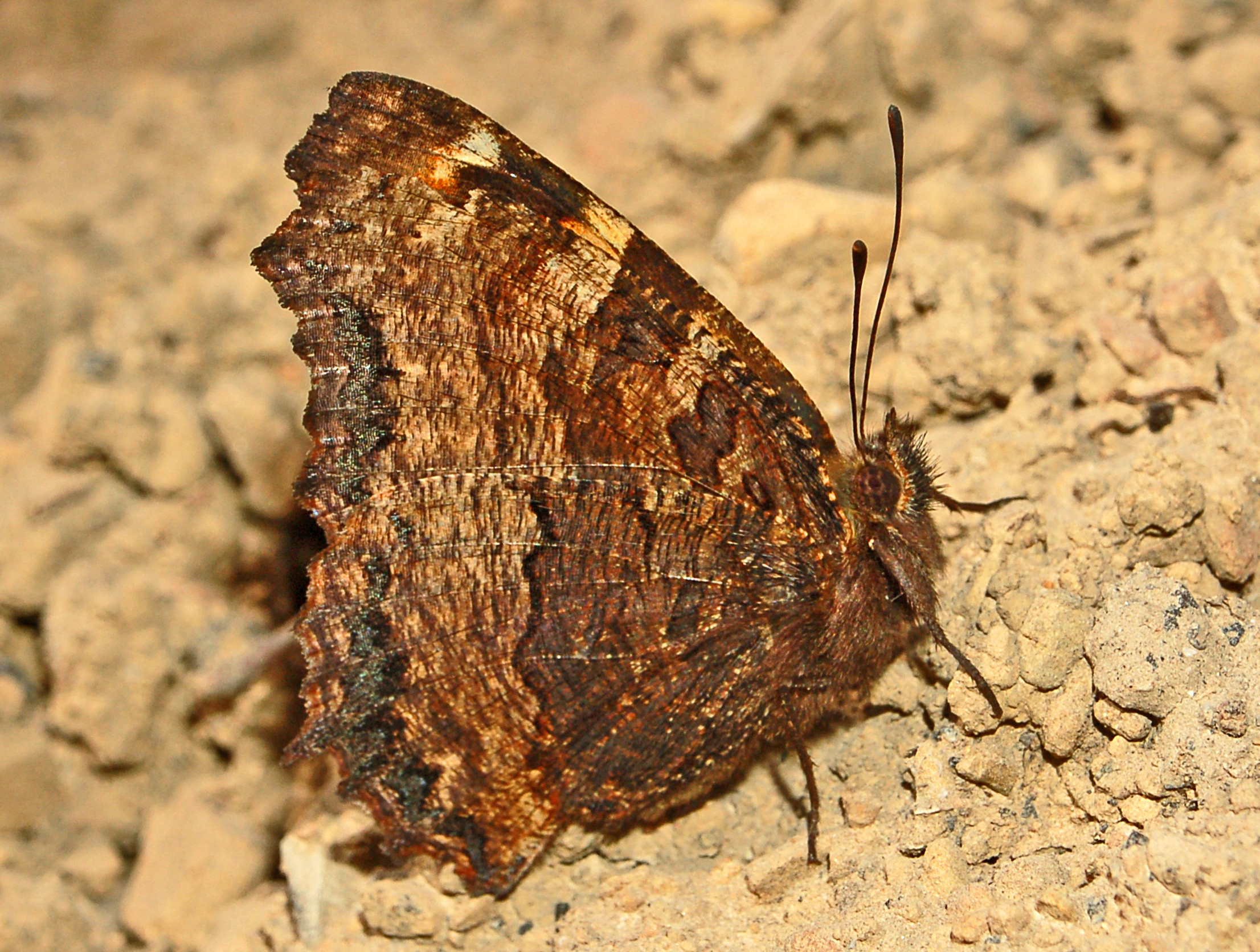
- Underside

Conservation status
- Least Concern (IUCN 3.1)

Scientific classification
- Kingdom: Animalia
- Phylum: Arthropoda
- Clade: Pancrustacea
- Class: Insecta
- Order: Lepidoptera
- Family: Nymphalidae
- Genus: Nymphalis
- Species: N. polychloros

Binomial name
- Nymphalis polychloros (Linnaeus, 1758)

Synonyms
- List: Papilio polychloros Linnaeus, 1758; Papilio testudo Esper, 1781; Vanessa pyromelas Freyer, 1834; Vanessa dixeyi Standfuss, 1895; Vanessa polychloros fervida Standfuss, 1896; Vanessa polychloros lucida Fruhstorfer, 1907; Vanessa polychloros dilucidus Fruhstorfer, 1907

= Large tortoiseshell =

Species of butterfly

The large tortoiseshell or blackleg tortoiseshell (Nymphalis polychloros) is a butterfly of the family Nymphalidae.

== Subspecies ==
Subspecies include:

- Nymphalis polychloros polychloros
- Nymphalis polychloros erythromelas (Austaut, 1885) – Algeria and Morocco

== Distribution and habitat ==
The species is found in North Africa, southern and central Europe, Turkey, southern Russia, the central and southern Urals, Kazakhstan and the Himalayas. In Central Europe it occurs mainly in warmer regions and has become generally rare, while populations remain more numerous in parts of the Mediterranean region and the southern Alps.

Large tortoiseshells inhabit open woodland, woodland edges and clearings, as well as orchards, hedgerows and areas of scattered trees. The larvae feed on a variety of deciduous trees including elm, poplar, willow and related species, while adults are often found basking on tree trunks or feeding on sap runs, overripe fruit and honeydew.

The species also occurs in Great Britain, where it has recently begun to re-establish itself following a prolonged absence.

=== Re-establishment in Britain ===
The large tortoiseshell was formerly widespread throughout England and Wales, but declined during the nineteenth century and disappeared as a resident species by the mid-twentieth century. For many decades it was therefore regarded as extinct in Britain.

The species began to reappear in southern England in the early twenty-first century, with notable influxes recorded in 2006 and 2007. At the time, many lepidopterists suggested that a proportion of these sightings could be the result of unauthorised releases by butterfly breeders attempting to re-establish the species, although immigration from continental Europe was also considered a possible explanation.

During the 2010s and early 2020s, however, increasing numbers of records were reported from southern England, particularly in counties such as Kent and Sussex. Caterpillars have since been recorded developing on host trees in the wild at several locations, confirming that the species is breeding again in Britain.

In 2026, Butterfly Conservation stated that the species should now be regarded as re-establishing itself as a resident butterfly in the United Kingdom. The organisation noted that, if current trends continue, the large tortoiseshell could represent Britain's 60th resident butterfly species, which would be the first addition to the national list since the charity was founded in 1968.

== Description ==
Nymphalis polychloros has a wingspan of 68–72 millimetres (2.7–2.8 in) in males, of 72–75 millimetres (2.8–3.0 in) in females. These medium to large butterflies have orange to red wings with black and yellow patches. Both wings with yellowish submarginal lunules, upon which follows a black band which is likewise composed of lunules and bears on the hindwing small blue spots. The underside of the wings is smoky brown with darker shades and black transverse pencilling. There is no sexual dimorphism. This species looks very similar to the small tortoiseshell (Aglais urticae), but it is more closely related to the Camberwell beauty and Nymphalis xanthomelas It differs from the small tortoiseshell by its larger size (45–62 mm. wingspan in Aglais urticae) and by the more orange ground colour of the upper surface of its wings and the orange base of its hindwings. The forewing is orange-brown, with 3 costal black blotches, 3 large black spots in the disc posteriorly and a narrow blackish terminal band – less bright than those of A. urticae, and lacking the apical white spot and the marginal blue dots of that species. Compared to the yellow-legged tortoiseshell it has yellower interspaces between the black blotches on the costal edges of its forewings and the dark marginal band is narrower. The surest way to recognize it, however, is by its dark haired tarsi yellow-legged tortoiseshell's tarsal hairs are light-coloured.

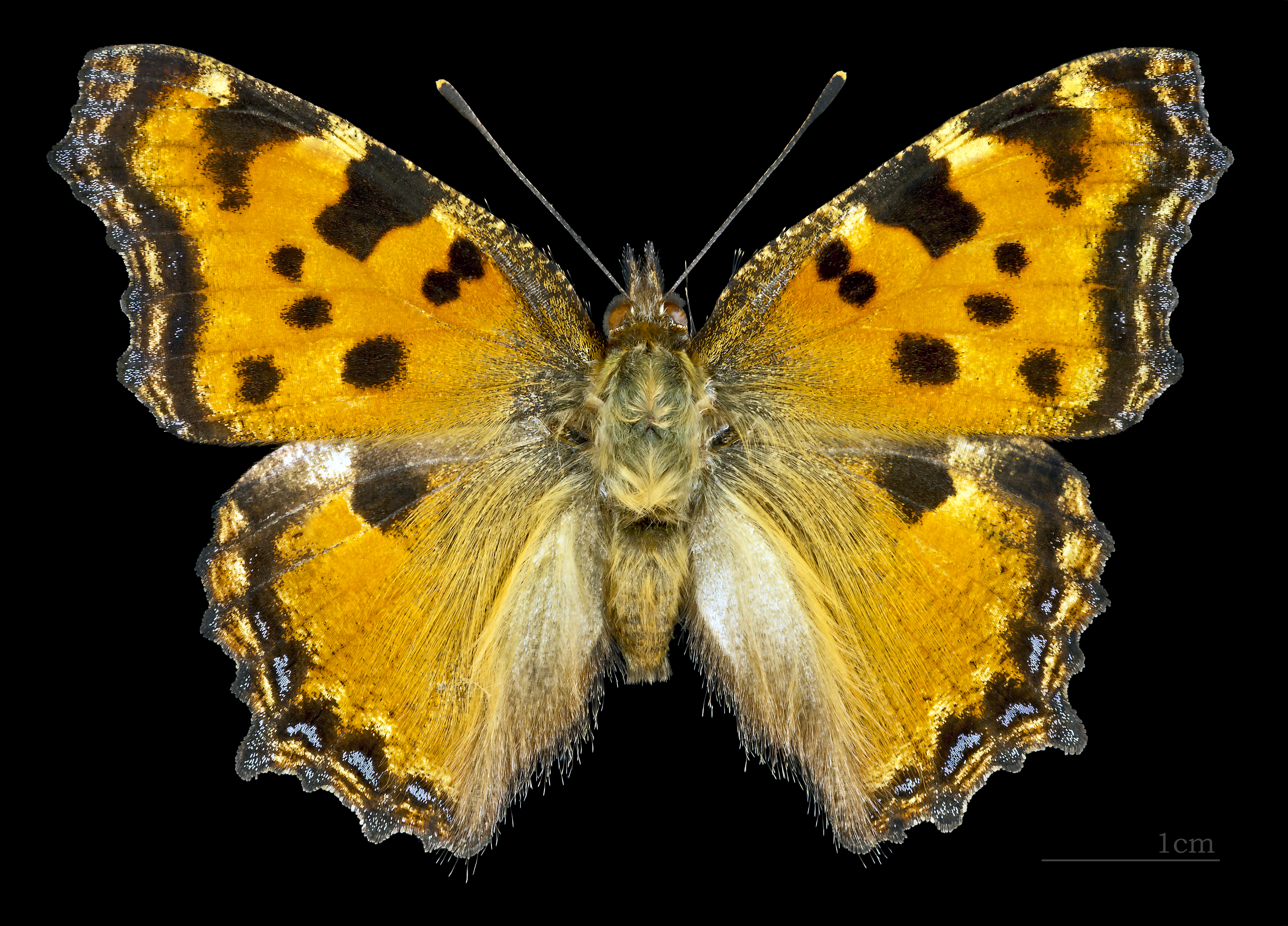
Male, dorsal side

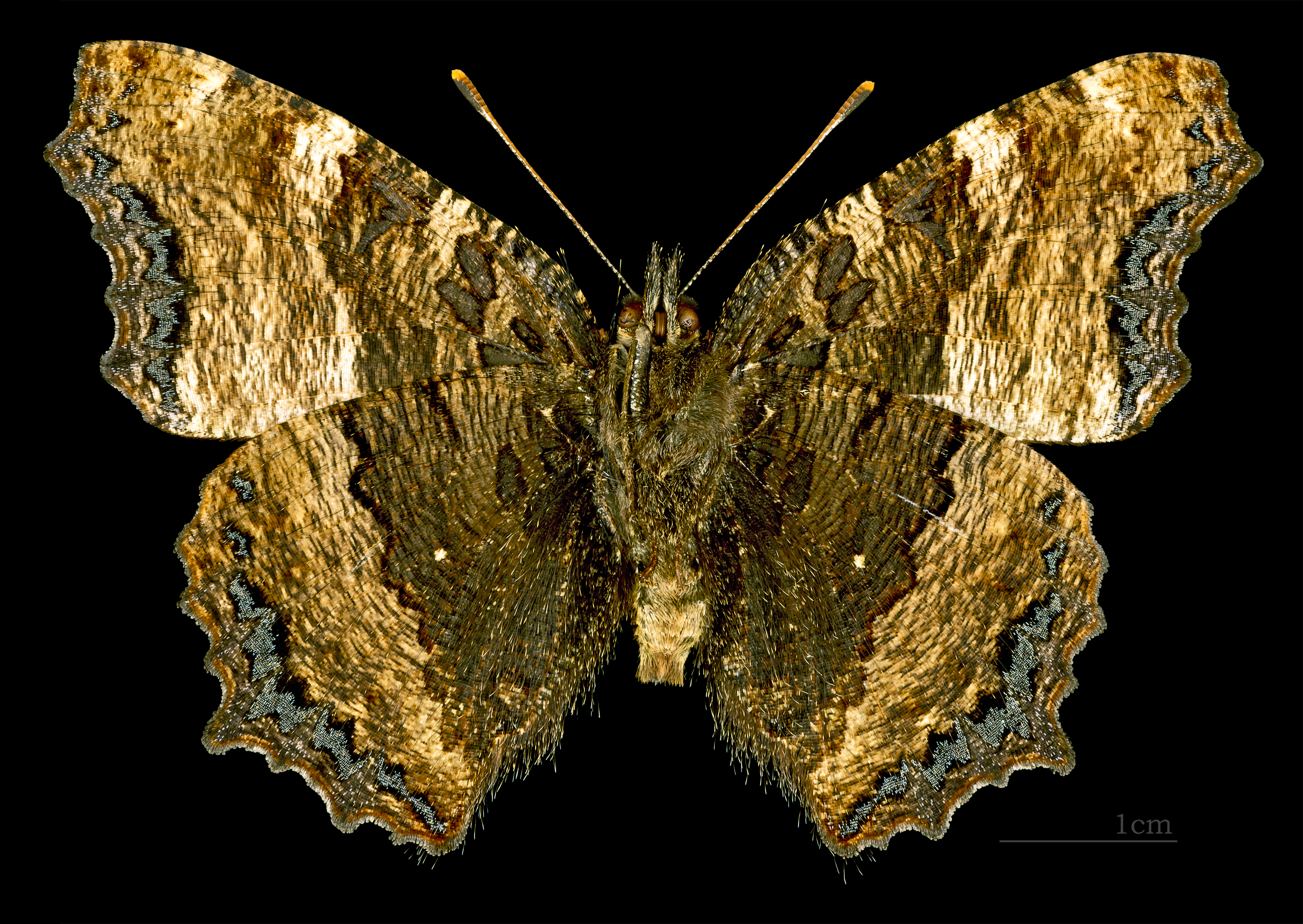
Male, ventral side

== Biology ==
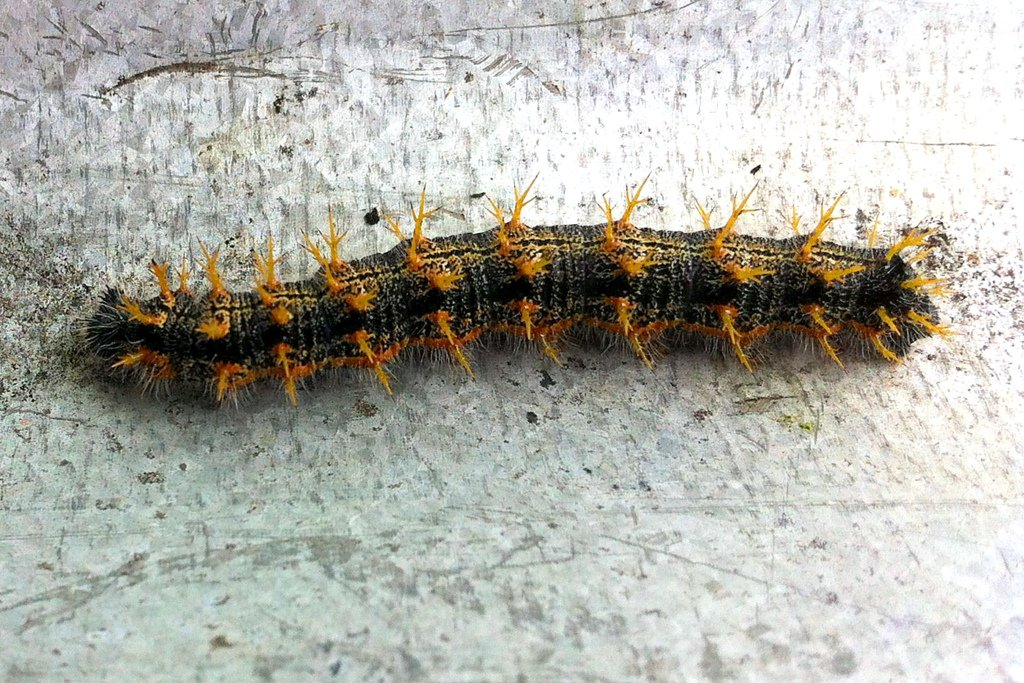
Caterpillar

The adult insect (imago) over-winters in dry dark places, such as hollow trees or out buildings. In late February or early March the butterflies emerge and mate. The females lay their pale green eggs (ova) in a continuous band around the upper twigs of elm (Ulmus spp.), sallow (Salix caprea and Salix viminalis), pear (Pyrus spp.), Malus, Sorbus, Crataegus, Populus, and Prunus spp. trees.

The caterpillars (larvae) are gregarious, and systematically strip the topmost twigs of the tree bare. They seem to have little defence against predation by birds. It is possible that their decline and extinction in the British Isles (late 1970s) was owing to the loss of predatory birds, which previously had preyed upon smaller birds if they strayed to the tops of these trees.

The full-grown larva spins a silk girdle around a twig further down the tree, and hangs from this by means of hooks (cremaster) at its rear end, to pupate. The chrysalis (pupa) is greyish brown with a slight silvery sheen. The species is univoltine, i.e. there is only one generation per year, the imagines emerging in July and August seek out sources high in sugar on which to feed. Tree sap and fermenting fruit are particularly popular.

== In popular culture ==
The large tortoiseshell is featured in Eon Productions' James Bond film On Her Majesty's Secret Service. While visiting M (evidently an amateur lepidopterist) in the study at his country home, Bond remarks over M's shoulder on the small size of a Nymphalis polychloros specimen, to M's surprise at his knowledge of lepidoptery, and perhaps his skill in not misidentifying the specimen as the smaller and more common small tortoiseshell (Aglais urticae). However, N. polychloros is not the specimen that M is handling during the exchange, though there is what appears to be a N. polychloros on the microscope slide mounted nearby.
