= Nymphalis cyanomelas =

Mexican tortoiseshell

Scientific classification
- Domain: Eukaryota
- Kingdom: Animalia
- Phylum: Arthropoda
- Class: Insecta
- Order: Lepidoptera
- Family: Nymphalidae
- Genus: Nymphalis
- Species: N. cyanomelas

Binomial name
- Nymphalis cyanomelas Doubleday, 1848

Synonyms
- Vanessa cyanomelas

Species of butterfly

Nymphalis cyanomelas, the Mexican tortoiseshell, is a butterfly species in the family Nymphalidae. It lives in Central America, from southern Mexico to El Salvador.

== Description ==
The undersides of both the male's and female's wings are dark mottled brown, much like tree bark, for camouflage when the wings are together. The top side is mostly bark brown changing to blue (cyan, hence the generic name cyanomelas) or greenish blue towards the wingtips. The wingtips also have chevrons or lozenge-shaped dark markings along the wing margins. Males and females are similarly marked.
