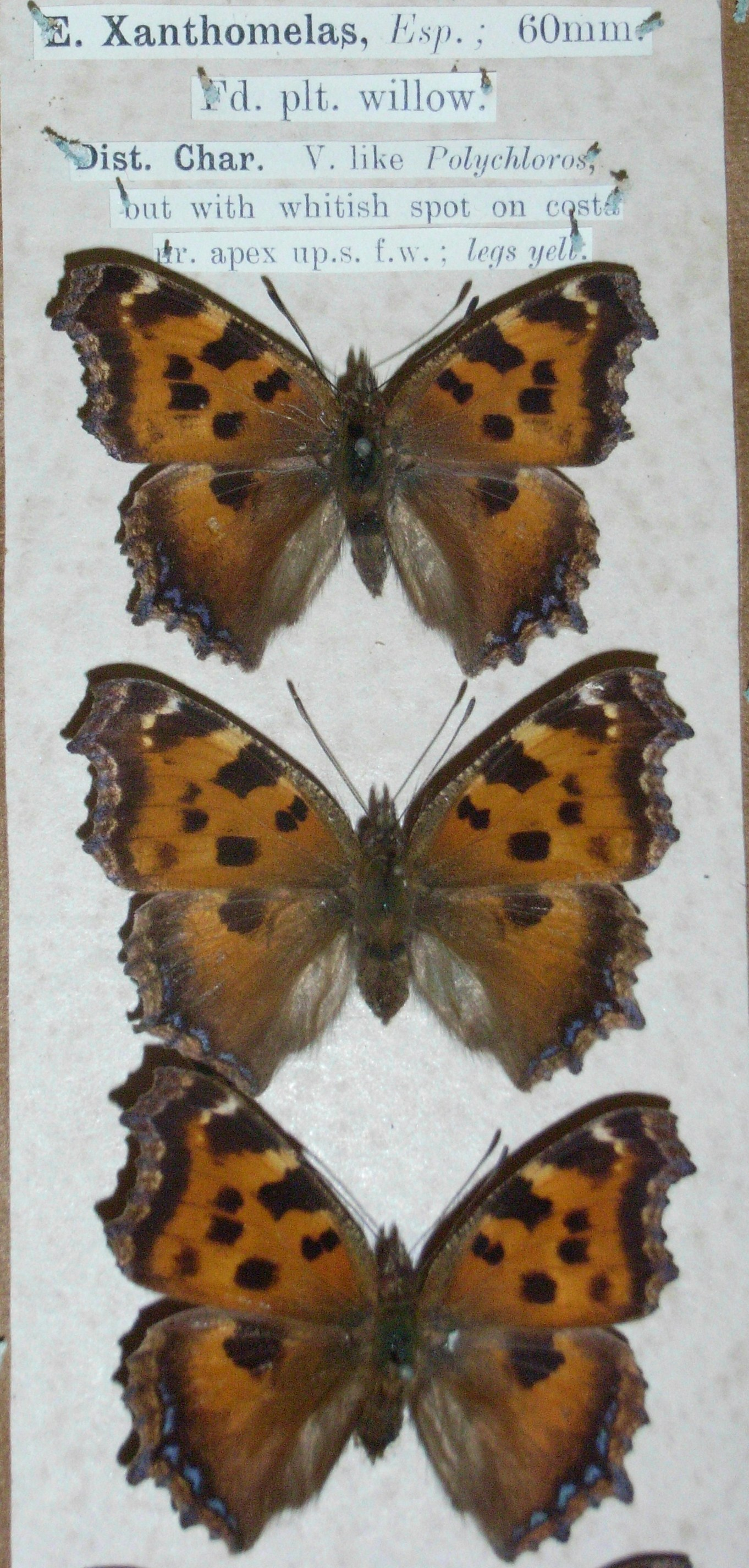

Conservation status
- Least Concern (IUCN 3.1)

Scientific classification
- Kingdom: Animalia
- Phylum: Arthropoda
- Class: Insecta
- Order: Lepidoptera
- Family: Nymphalidae
- Genus: Nymphalis
- Species: N. xanthomelas

Binomial name
- Nymphalis xanthomelas (Denis & Schiffermüller, 1775)

Synonyms
- Papilio xanthomelas

= Nymphalis xanthomelas =

Scarce tortoiseshell

Species of butterfly

Nymphalis xanthomelas, the scarce tortoiseshell, is a species of nymphalid butterfly found in eastern Europe and Asia. This butterfly is also referred as yellow-legged tortoiseshell or large tortoiseshell (however, in Europe, "large tortoiseshell" is usually reserved for Nymphalis polychloros).

== Description ==
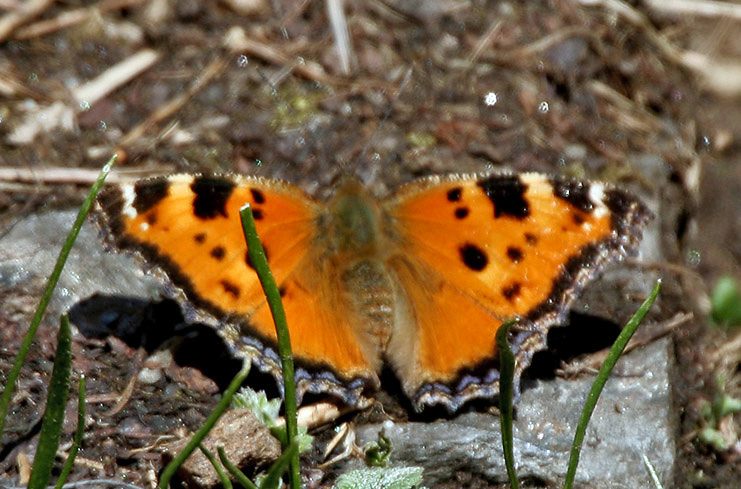
Adult

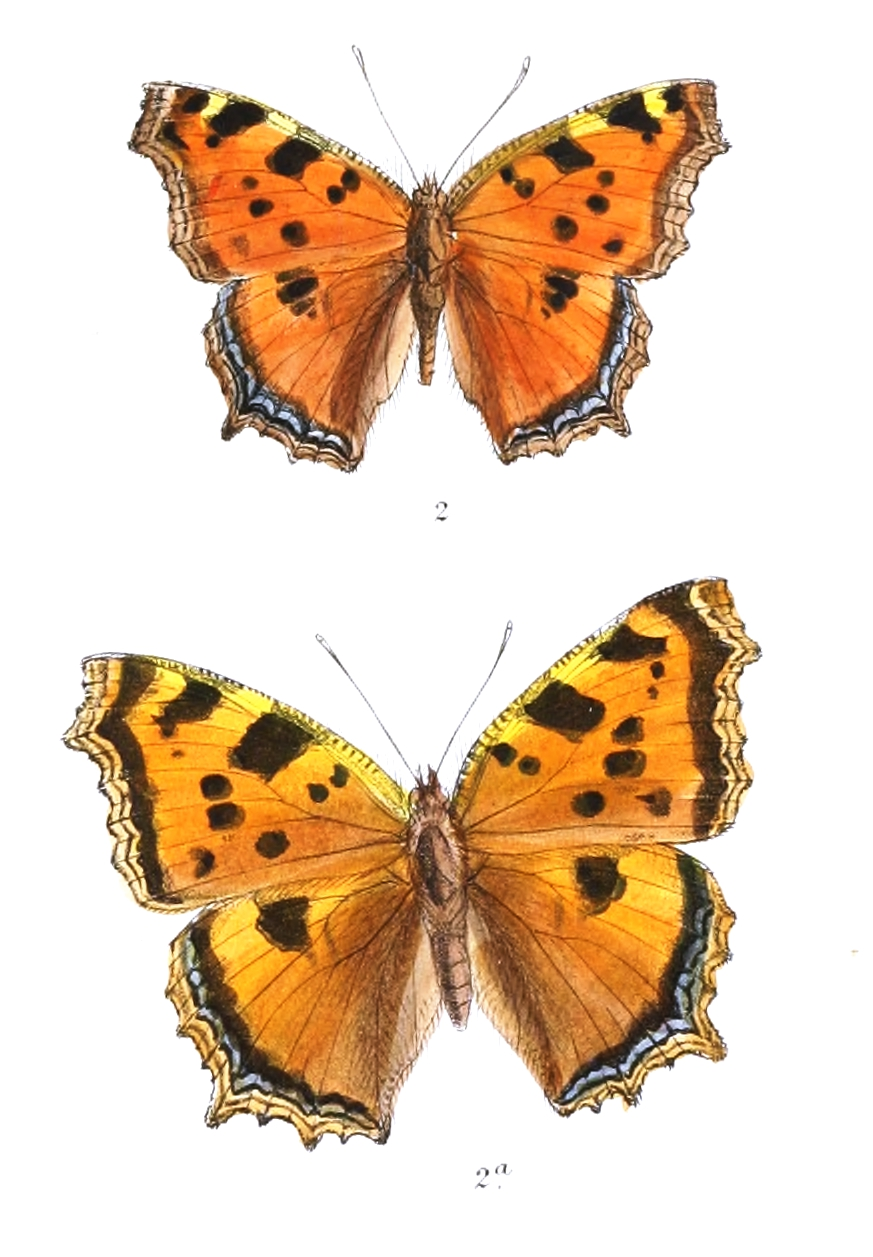
Illustration from Lepidoptera Indica

Upperside rich orange yellow, forewing has costal margin dusky black on the basal half flecked with brown; two oval black spots in cell, a quadrate subcostal black patch just beyond the discocellulars, a second more oblique irregular black patch beyond this, and three large oval discal black spots, with a smaller dusky patch beyond the lowest spot. Hindwing uniform, with a large subcostal black patch. Forewings and hindwings with a common sinuous transverse subterminal black band, and a terminal dusky band flecked with golden brown; the black subterminal band on the hindwing with an outer border of blue lunules margined outwardly by a slender black line; the forewing just below the costa, between the black patches beyond the cell and between the outer black patch and subterminal band, prominently pale yellow. In the female, an incomplete series of yellow lunules also borders the subterminal black band on the outer side.

Underside dull ochraceous brown, the basal half of both forewings and hindwings and a broad terminal margin darker brown; the wings entirely and thickly covered with slender transverse dark brown striae; irregular cell-marks on the forewing and a transverse highly sinuous subterminal band of dark blue lunules on both wings: these lunules defined by slender black lines on both sides. Bases of the wings with a clothing of long stiff black hairs, which are blunt at their apices, and on the forewing extend along the basal half of the costal margin, projecting outwards beyond it.

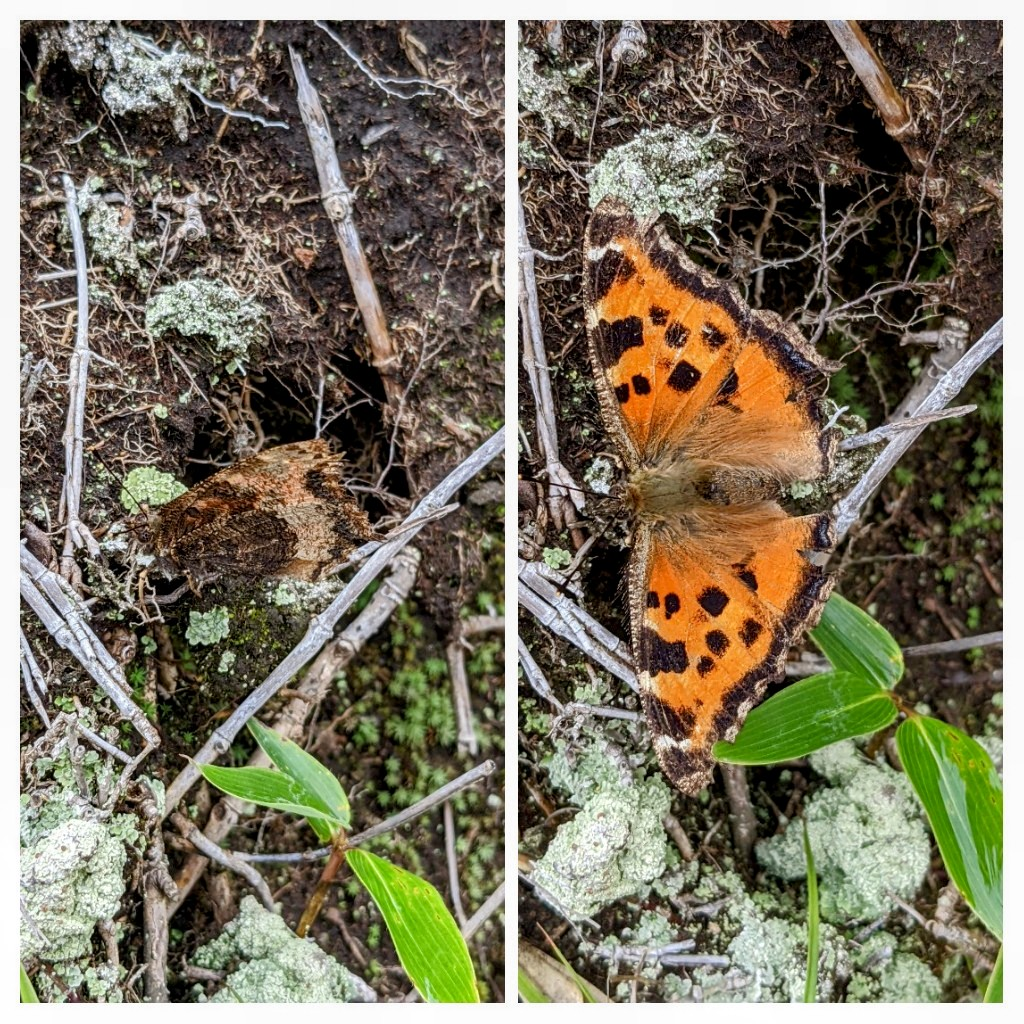
Side by side comparison of the upper and undersides of the Scarce Tortoiseshell's wings demonstrating camouflage.

Antennae, head and thorax very dark brown, abdomen fulvous (tawny); beneath very hairy; palpi, thorax and abdomen dark brown, the abdomen towards the apex paler.

Wingspan of 63–68 mm.

== Distribution ==
Eastern Europe; the Himalayas from Kashmir to Mussoorie; China and Japan. In 1953, recorded by Christine Foord, British entomologist, at Shipbourne in Kent, Southeast England.

== Life history ==
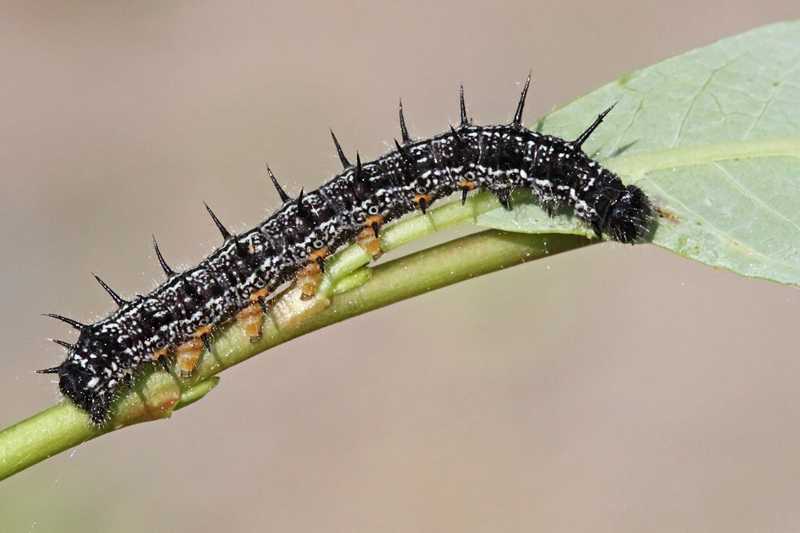
Larva

"Larva. Cylindrical, slightly hairy. Head subquadrate, vertex sharply indented in front, slightly hairy, front and cheeks with several small pointed tubercles. Third to last segments armed with a dorsal row of short spines, and three lateral rows of long rigid branched spines. Colour dark pupurescent-brown, almost black, palest beneath; with two dorsal slender yellowish macular lines, and a single similar lateral line, the subdorsal and sublateral areas longitudinally speckled with numerous irregular-shaped yellow dots. Spines black; head black. Reared on willow." (Frederic Moore quoted in Bingham)

=== Larval host plants ===
- Celtis australis
- Pistacia integerrima
- Salix elegans
- Salix excelsa
