= Attorney General Ford =

Attorney General Ford may refer to:

- Aaron D. Ford (born 1972), Attorney General of Nevada
- Sam C. Ford (1882–1961), Attorney General of Montana
- Tirey L. Ford (1857–1928), Attorney-General of California

== See also ==
- General Ford (disambiguation)
