= California tortoiseshell =

- Female

Scientific classification
- Kingdom: Animalia
- Phylum: Arthropoda
- Clade: Pancrustacea
- Class: Insecta
- Order: Lepidoptera
- Family: Nymphalidae
- Genus: Nymphalis
- Species: N. californica

Binomial name
- Nymphalis californica (Boisduval, 1852)

Species of butterfly

The California tortoiseshell (Nymphalis californica) is a butterfly of the family Nymphalidae.

== Description ==
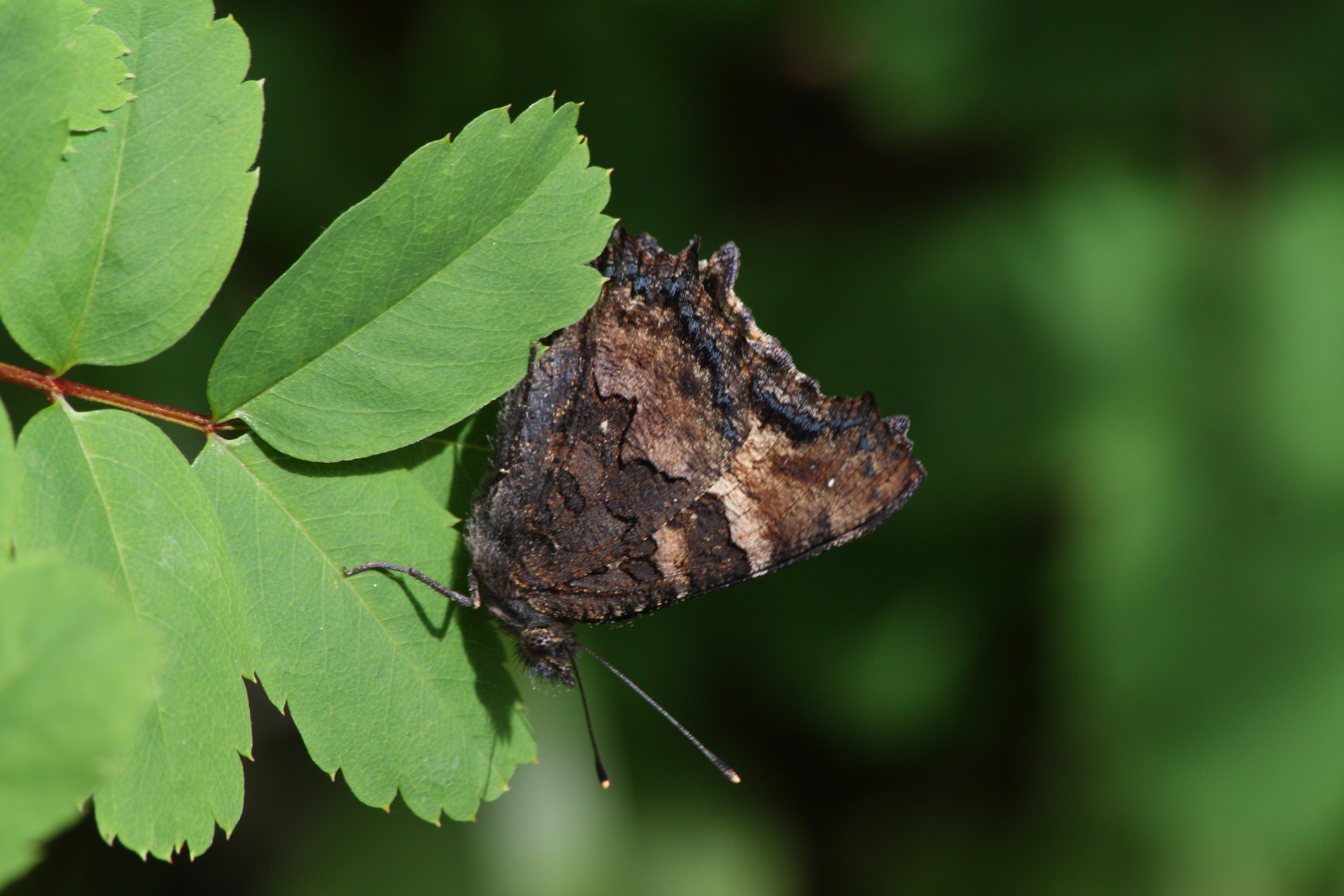
On Sorbus sitchensis. The underside of the wing resembles a dead leaf.

The wings of the California tortoiseshell have ragged edges. The upper sides of the wings are orange with black spots and a wide black margin. The undersides of the wings are a mottled dark brown. Its wingspan varies from 3.2 to 7 cm (1 1/4–2 3/4 inches).

Caterpillars are black with white spots and hairs. Each segment of the body has seven spines.

== Ecology ==
Larvae eat various species of Ceanothus. This butterfly is known for having irregular population explosions. Ravens commonly prey on California tortoiseshells in population explosions during outbreak years. Massive swarms of the California Tortoiseshell are a common sight in some years at Lassen Volcanic National Park and throughout the Sierra Nevada. According to the National Park Service, "In late July to early August 2004, a swarm of Tortoiseshells 40 to 50 miles long by 15 miles wide traveled south along the Sierra Nevadas." Other population explosions took place in 1932, 2019 and 2024. The National Park Service reports that in some years, "unsuspecting hikers are stunned by clouds of tortoiseshells in Lassen Volcanic and especially on Lassen Peak."
