= Regina Thunder =

Junior football club, Regina, Saskatchewan, Canada

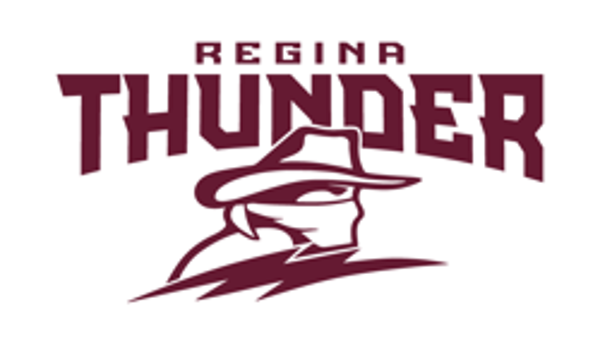
Logo

General information
- Founded: 1999
- Stadium: Mosaic Stadium, Leibel Field
- Headquartered: Regina, Saskatchewan
- Colours: Maroon and white
- Website: Official website

Personnel
- Head coach: Scott MacAulay
- President: Murad Al-Katib

League / conference affiliations
- Canadian Junior Football League; Prairie Football Conference

Championships
- Canadian Bowl wins: 2; 2013, 2026
- PFC Championships: 4; 2013, 2022, 2024, 2026

The Regina Thunder, originally known as the Prairie Thunder, are a junior football club, based out of Regina, Saskatchewan. The Thunder are a part of the Prairie Football Conference (PFC), which is a six-member conference with teams from all three prairie provinces. The PFC is a member of the Canadian Junior Football League, and participates in national championships with two other conferences, based out of Ontario and British Columbia.

Each year the Thunder compete with their provincial rivals, the Saskatoon Hilltops for the Shrine Bowl. The Shrine Bowl is awarded to the team who has the highest total points in the two regular season games between each other.

2013 was a huge year for the Thunder as they defeated the three time defending CJFL champions 21-16 in Saskatoon. They would go on to defeat the V.I. Raiders in the CJFL championship 55-26, in Regina.

== Notable Thunder alumni ==
- Jeff Yorga – Toronto Argonauts, Offensive Lineman
- Chris Getzlaf – Saskatchewan Roughriders Receiver
- Stu Foord – Saskatchewan Roughriders Running Back
- Paul Woldu – Saskatchewan Roughriders Defensive Back
- Ivan Brown – Montreal Alouettes Defensive Lineman
- Dan Clark – Saskatchewan Roughriders Offensive Lineman
- Zack Evans – Saskatchewan Roughriders Defensive Lineman
- Rory Kohlert – Winnipeg Blue Bombers Receiver
- Logan Ferland – Saskatchewan Roughriders Offensive Lineman

== Coaching staff ==
Position	Holder
Head coach & Special Teams	Scott MacAulay
Offensive coordinator	Paul Tokarz
Defensive coordinator	Paul Dawson
Special Team Coordinator	Brett Strong
Leadership & Development Coordinator	John Tokar
Quarterbacks coach	Ethan Hugg
Running backs coach	Rob Umbach
Receivers coach	De Shawn Le Jour
Offensive line coach	Sheldon Neald
Offensive line coach	Jason Kostiuk
Linebackers coach	Kelsey Peterson
Defensive backs coach	Matt Rumpel
Defensive backs coach	Adam King
Defensive line coach	Roger Flahr
Defensive line coach	Jordan Tholl
Defensive assistant	Ed Carlton
Recruitment Coordinator	Gord MacQuarrie

== Gallery ==
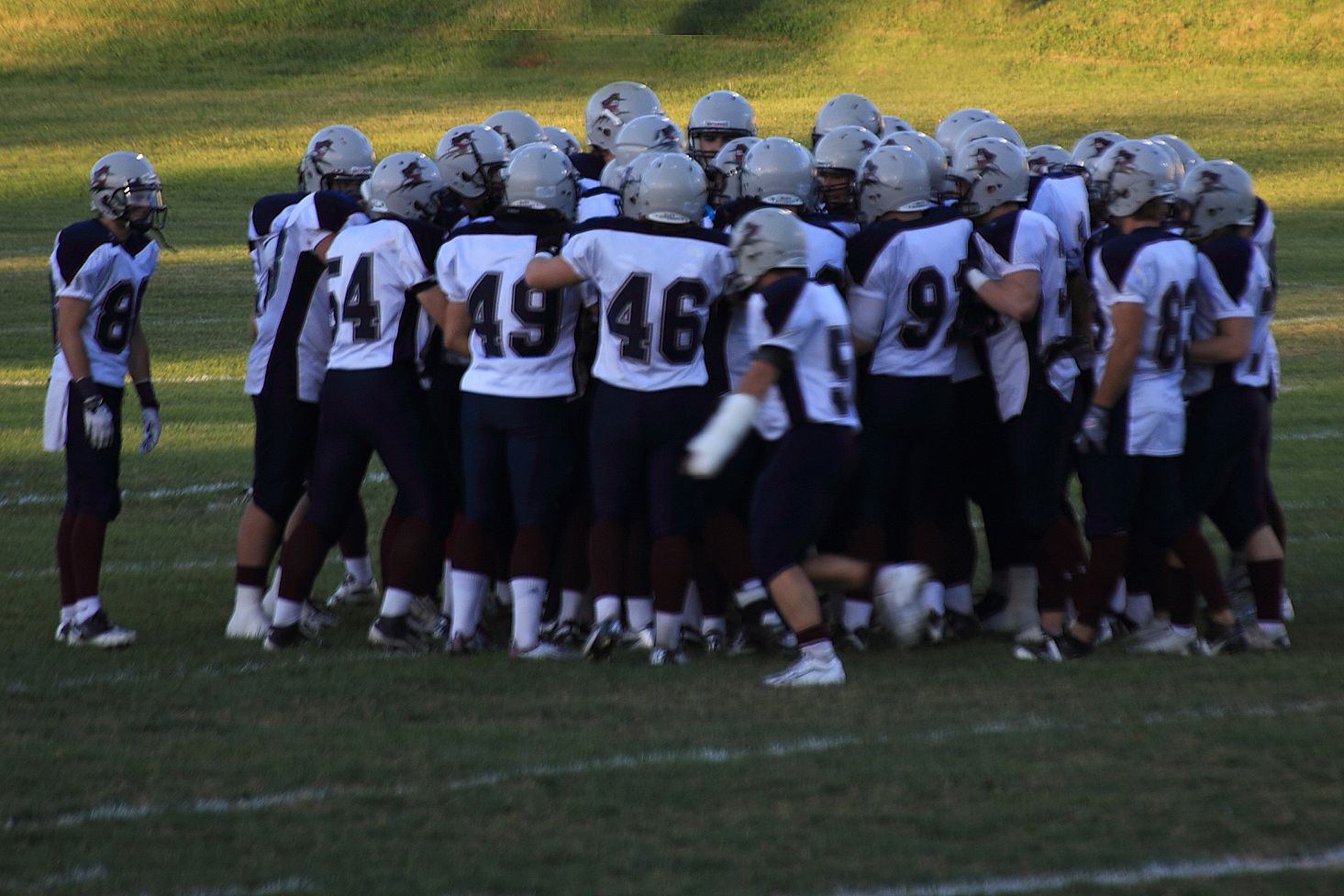
September 8, 2012 Pre-game huddle Photograph attribution Julia Adamson

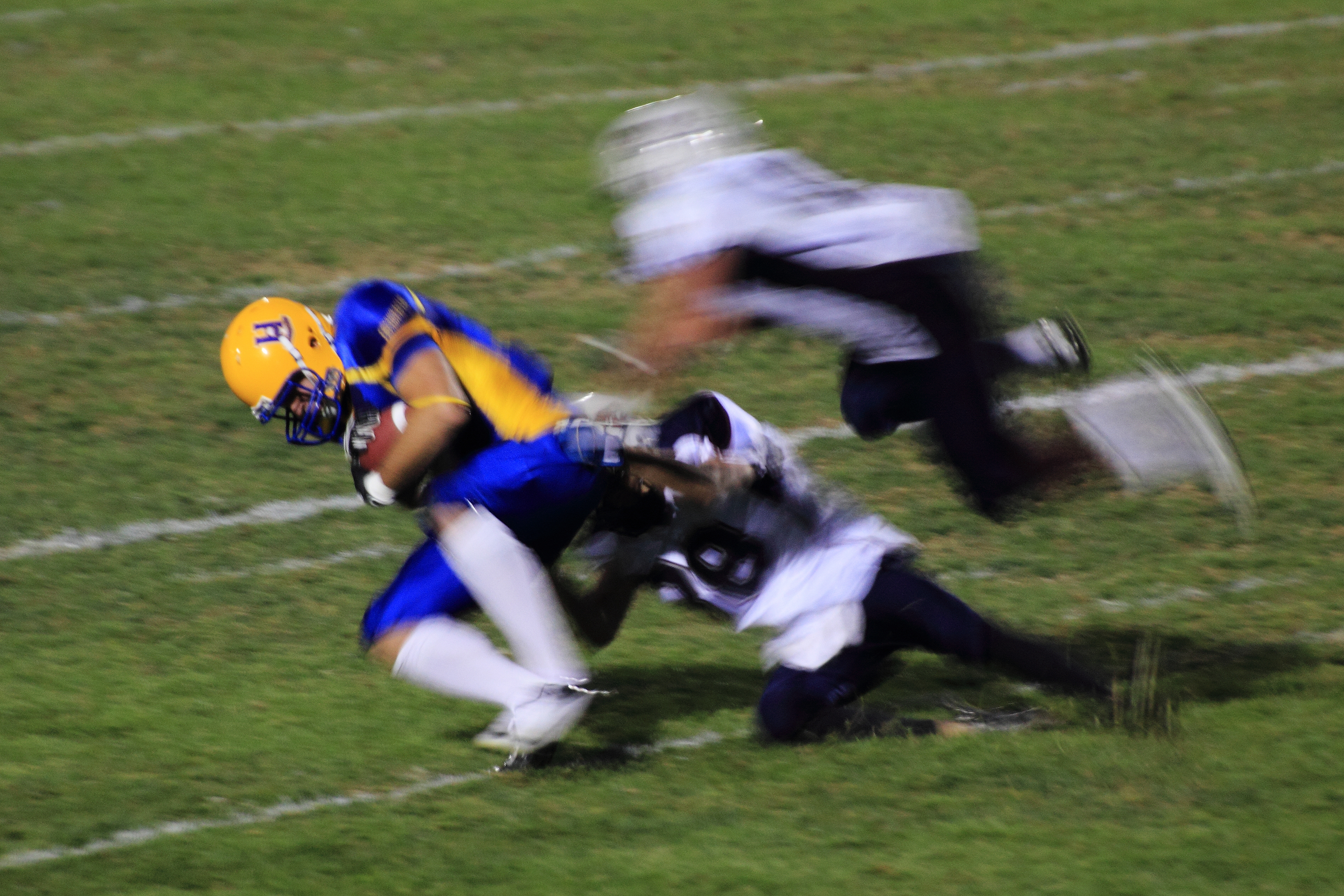
September 8, 2012 Tackle by Regina Thunder Defensive Back #38 Landon Walter Photograph attribution Julia Adamson

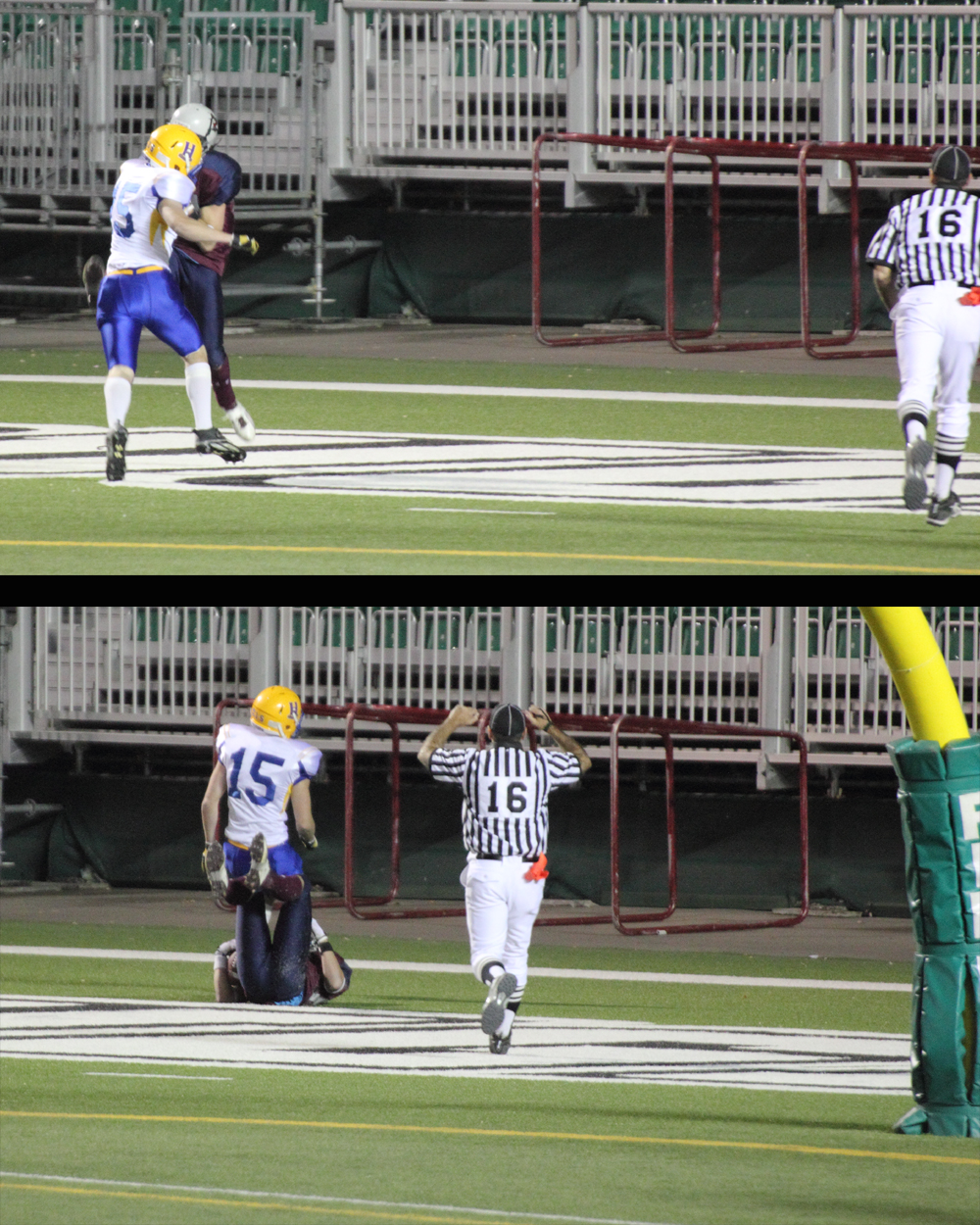
Thunder Touchdown bringing the score to 16 Thunder to 41 Hilltops. Convert was taken at 2:49 in the 4th quarter and was good bringing the score to 17 41. The game concluded at Hilltops 42–17 Thunder.

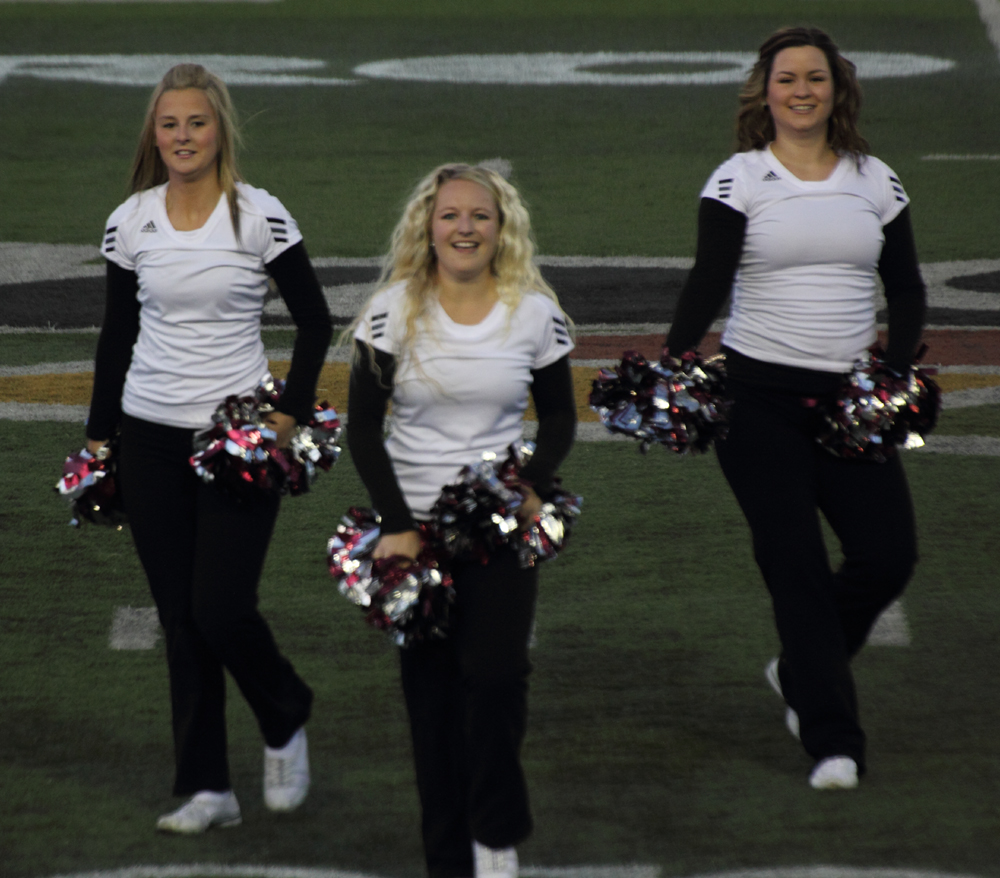
Thunder Cheerleaders

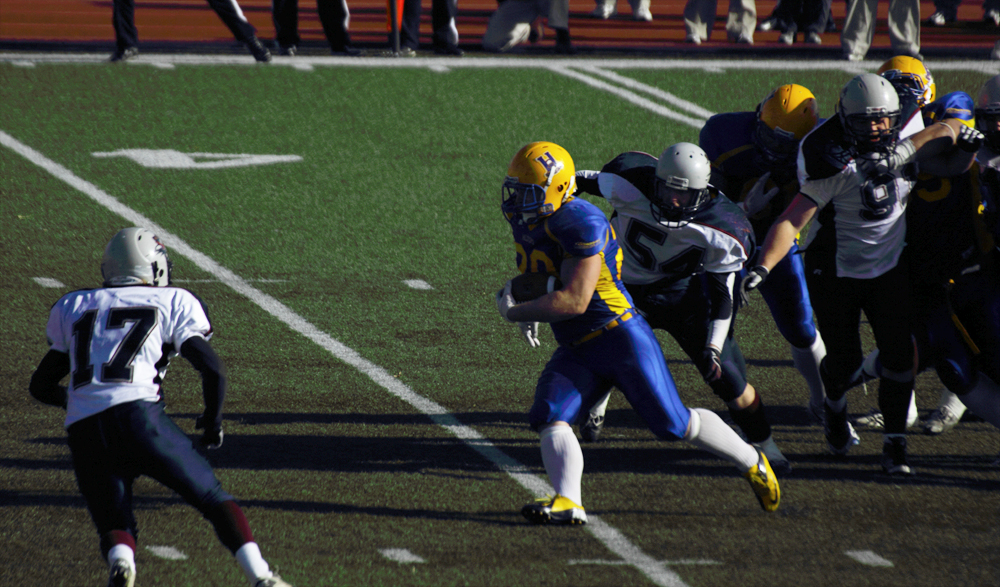
40 yard run by Andre Lalonde Hilltop 20 Oct 21 2012

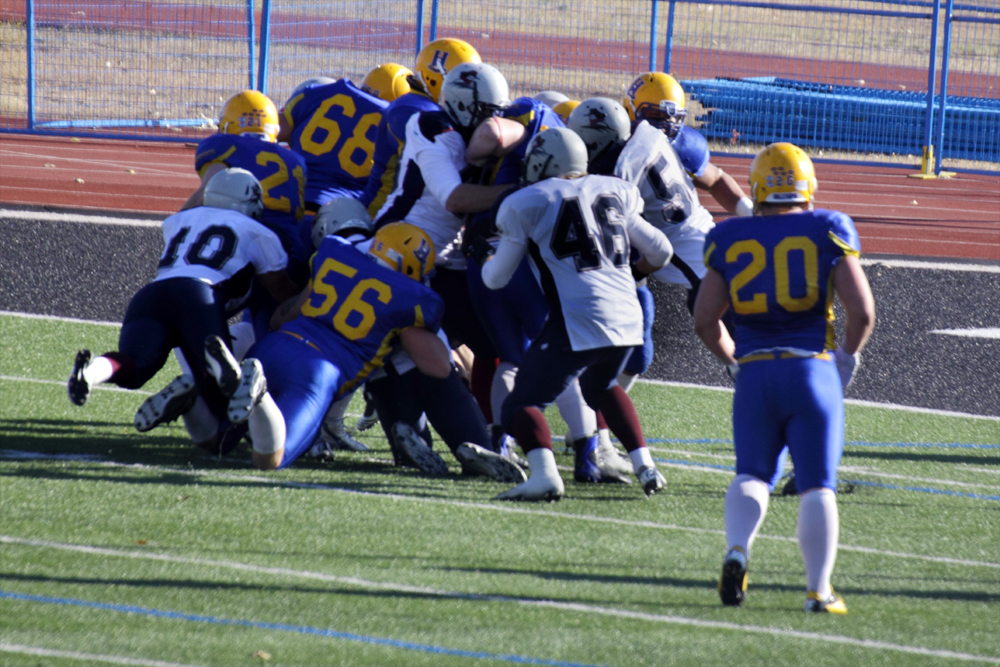
Linebacker #10 Yianni Cabylis Regina Thunder voted PFC Defensive TEam All Star

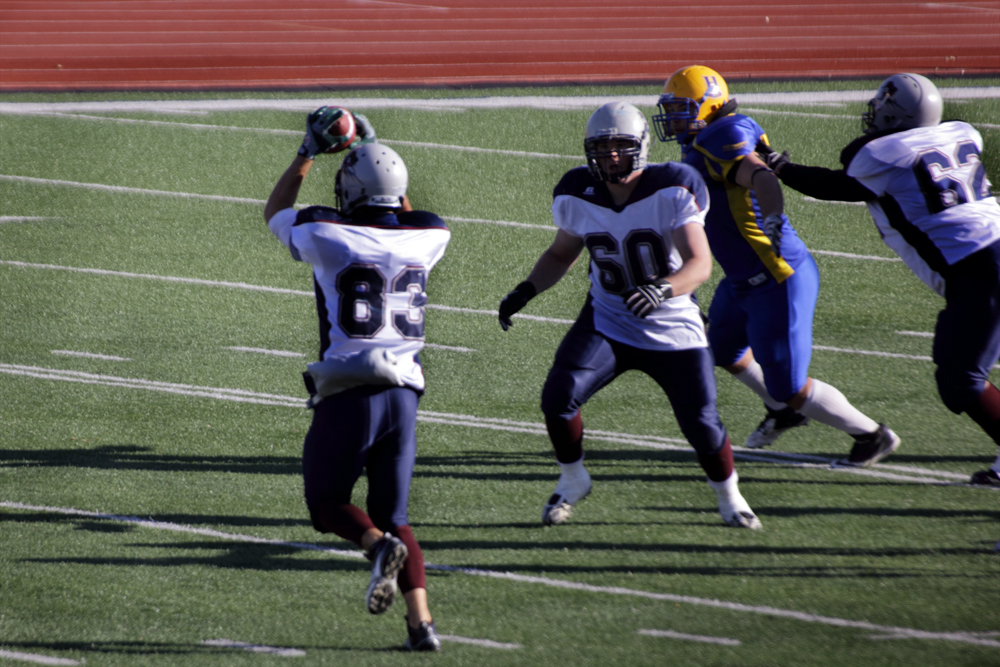
83 Clay Cooke superb reception fourth quarter Oct 21, 2012
