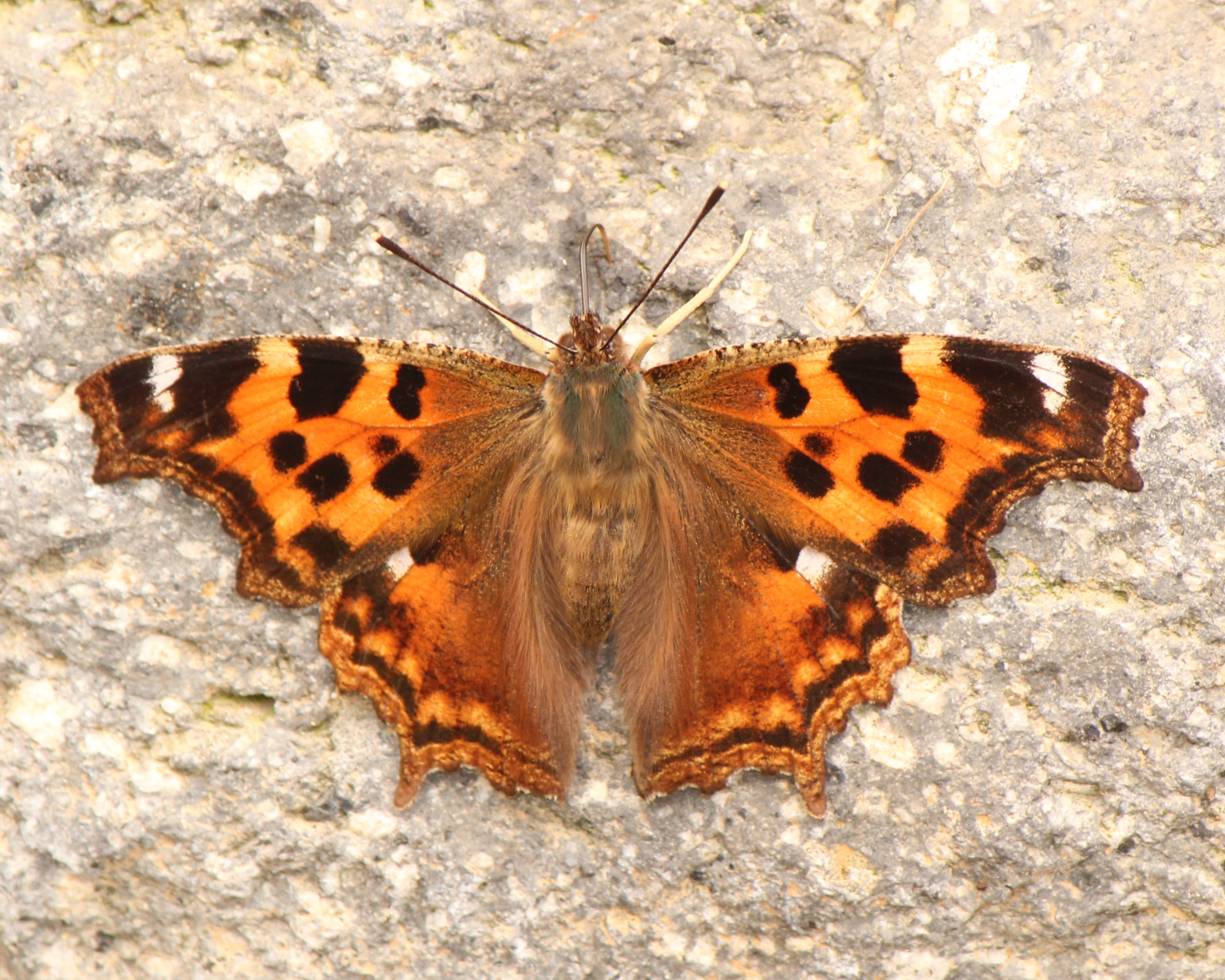
- Compton tortoiseshell (N. vaualbum)

Scientific classification
- Kingdom: Animalia
- Phylum: Arthropoda
- Class: Insecta
- Order: Lepidoptera
- Family: Nymphalidae
- Tribe: Nymphalini
- Genus: Nymphalis; Kluk, 1780

Species
- Six, see text

Synonyms
- Euvanessa Scudder, 1889; Roddia Korshunov,1995; Antiopana Korb, 2005

= Nymphalis =

Genus of butterflies

Nymphalis, commonly known as the tortoiseshells or anglewing butterflies, is a genus of brush-footed butterflies. The genera Aglais, Inachis, Polygonia and Kaniska, were sometimes included as subgenera of Nymphalis but they may instead be treated as distinct genera. See also anglewing butterflies. For other butterflies named tortoiseshells, see the genus Aglais.

The name Nymphalis, established by Jan Krzysztof Kluk in 1780, is the oldest name among the generic names for a relatively small group of butterflies collectively known as anglewing butterflies. In zoological nomenclature, the oldest name has a priority over other names. The collective name anglewing butterflies is derived from a Latinised term Papiliones angulati. This name was probably used for the first time by Ignaz Schiffermüller in 1775–1776. The anglewing butterflies as a group are characterized by a cryptic silhouette and by the colouration and pattern on the ventral side of both wings. This signature mark is an important taxonomic characteristic as well as a significant evolutionary adaptation.

During winter months, in latitudes with snow cover, all members of this group hibernate as adult butterflies. During hibernation, hidden in various shelters, the butterflies are dormant. The camouflage provided by crypsis is advantageous to hibernating butterflies. Potential predators will have difficulties in seeing the dormant butterflies. With their wings closed, exposing only the ventral cryptically coloured underside, they blend in with their surroundings.

Today, the anglewing butterflies are found only in the northern hemisphere. Carl Linnaeus described the first members of this group in 1758, and it has since become clear that anglewing butterflies evolved from a common ancestor. The most recent studies include Nylin et al., 2001; Wahlberg & Nylin, 2003; Wahlberg et al. 2011, 2009, 2005. The sister group of Nymphalis is Vanessa.

== Species ==
Listed alphabetically:

Image	Species	Common name
	Nymphalis antiopa (Linnaeus, 1758)	Mourning cloak, Camberwell beauty
	Nymphalis californica (Boisduval, 1852)	California tortoiseshell
	Nymphalis cyanomelas (Doubleday, [1848])	Mexican tortoiseshell
	Nymphalis polychloros (Linnaeus, 1758)	Large tortoiseshell, blackleg tortoiseshell
	Nymphalis vaualbum (Denis & Schiffermüller, 1775)	Compton tortoiseshell, false comma
	Nymphalis xanthomelas (Esper, 1781)	Scarce tortoiseshell, yellow-legged tortoiseshell
