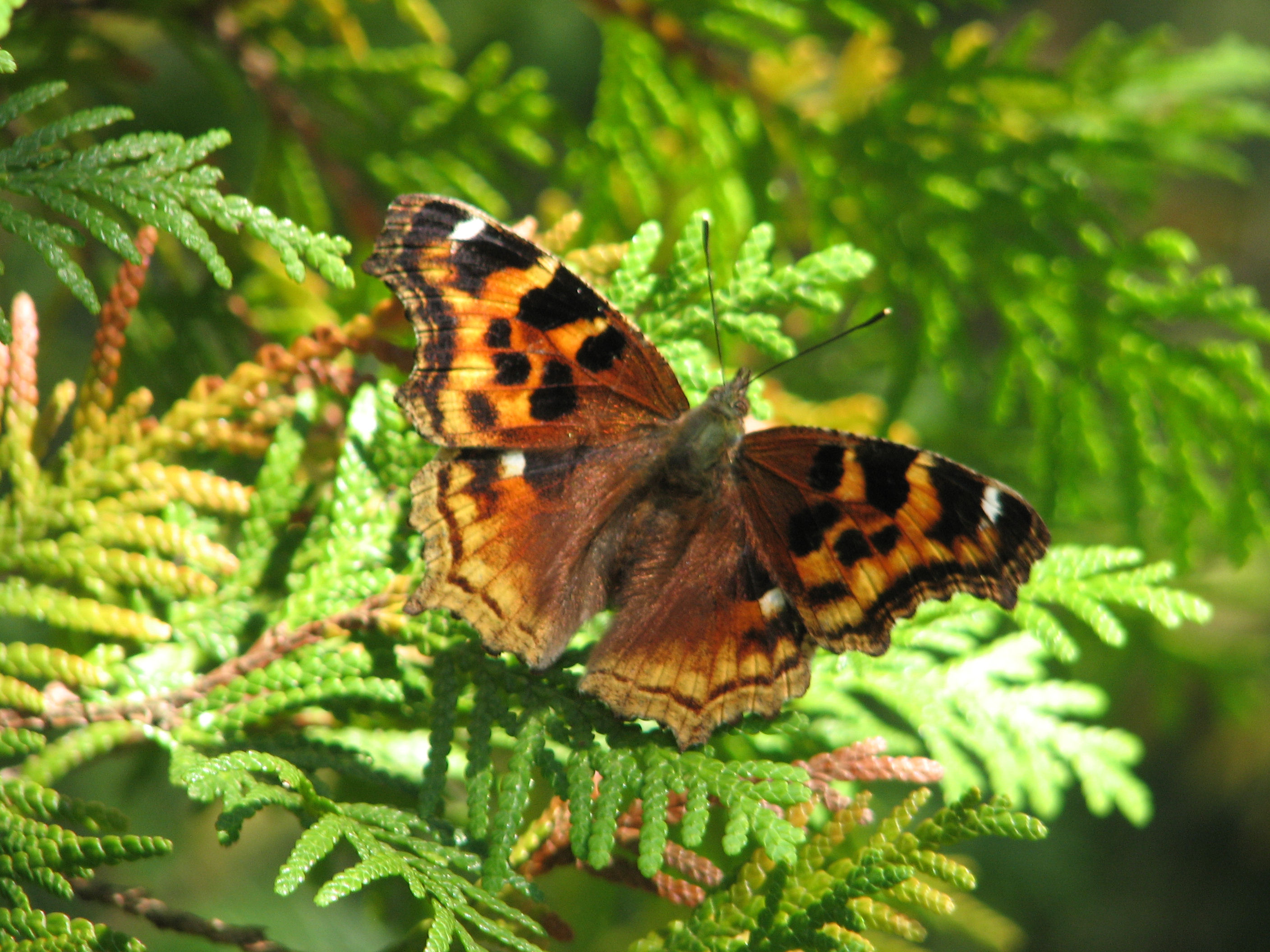
- In Temagami, Ontario

Scientific classification
- Kingdom: Animalia
- Phylum: Arthropoda
- Class: Insecta
- Order: Lepidoptera
- Family: Nymphalidae
- Genus: Nymphalis
- Species: N. vaualbum

Binomial name
- Nymphalis vaualbum ([Denis & Schiffermüller], 1775)

Subspecies
- N. vaualbum j-album (Boisduval & Le Conte, 1835)); N. vaualbum l-album (Esper, 1781); N. vaualbum samurai (Fruhstorfer, 1907)

Synonyms
- Papilio vau album; Polygonia vau-album; Roddia vaualbum; Papilio l-album; Vanessa l-album; Polygonia l-album; Nymphalis l-album; Roddia l-album; Roddia j-album

= Nymphalis vaualbum =

Compton tortoiseshell

Species of butterfly

Nymphalis vaualbum or N. l-album, the Compton tortoiseshell, or false comma, is a species of butterfly in the family Nymphalidae.

== Taxonomy ==
An assertion that the name Nymphalis l-album is in fact the correct name over the widely used Nymphalis vaualbum proved to have backing when it was discovered the description covering vaualbum did not include a description or type specimen. Thus vaualbum can be considered nomen nudum, giving Nymphalis l-album priority.

== Description ==
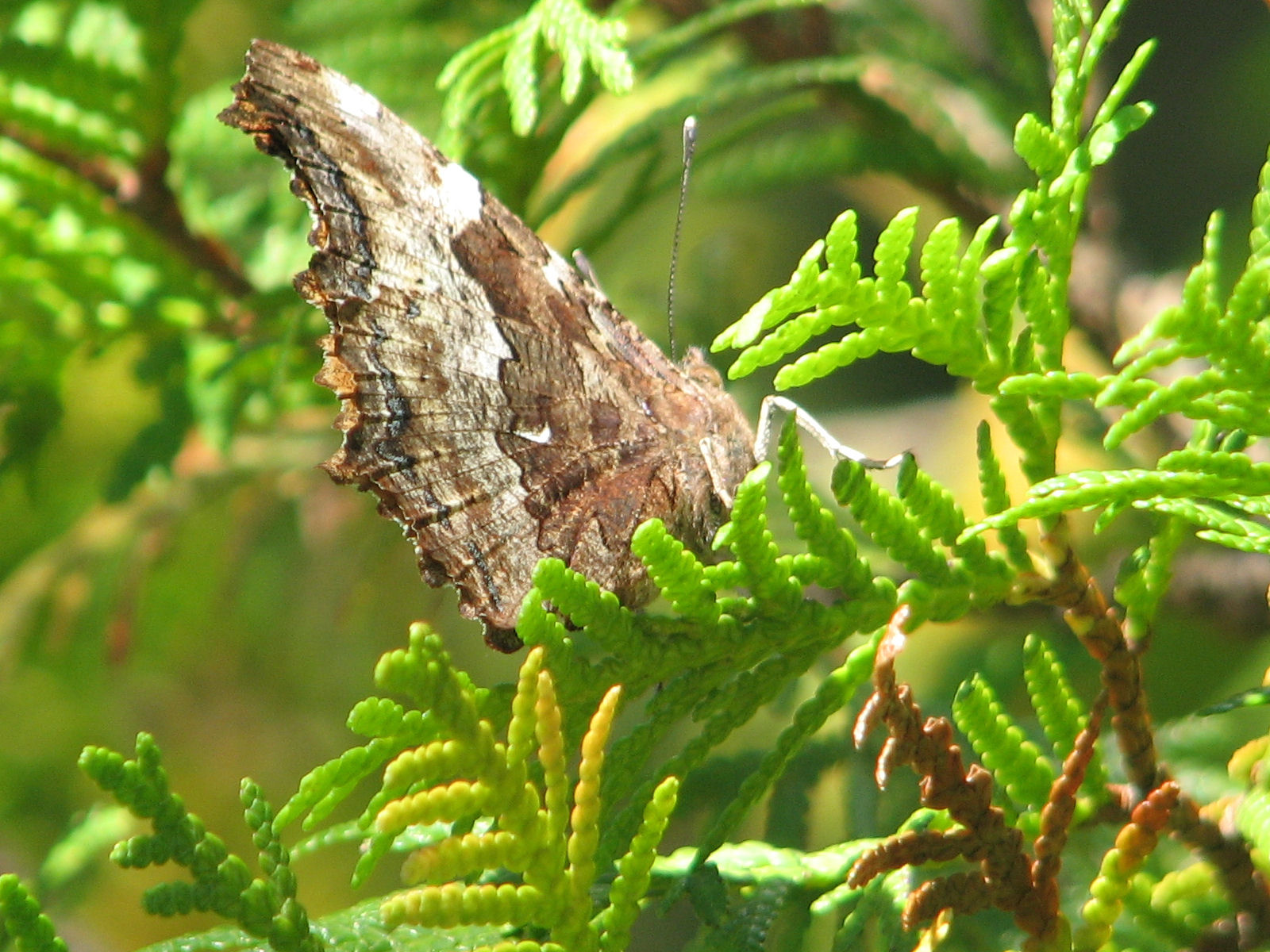
Underside

Nymphalis vaualbum in Japan

Wingspan: 2 1/2 - 3 1/16 inches (6.4 - 7.8 cm). The Upper side is orange-brown with darker wing bases and black patches. There is a single white costal spot on both the forewing and the hindwing. The verso is mottled grey and brown, with dark bases and borders. Regardless of the ground colour (grey-brown or a buff brown), there is great contrast between the dark chocolate-brown discal region and the paler postdiscal area in males, less so in females. The hindwing verso has a V-shaped white mark adjoining the cell at S4. In some specimens this ‘V’ is replaced by a dash, an ‘L’, a ‘C’ or a ‘J’ and it may consist of just a few white scales, or be absent altogether. This marking is far more prominent in males. This V mark is shared with Polygonia c-album, hence the name false comma.

== Distribution ==
It is seen in deciduous and coniferous forest in a wide range throughout the Northern Hemisphere. The nominate subspecies (N. v. l-album) is found throughout central Asia. The subspecies, N. v. j-album's, range consists of Alaska and Canada south into Montana and Wyoming. They are seen east to New England and eastern Canada and south to North Carolina and Missouri. They rarely migrate to Newfoundland and Labrador, Nebraska, and Florida. The species is also found in the Palearctic - Eastern Europe, Romania, Ukraine, the south of Russia to the areas west of the Urals, the southern part of Siberia to the Himalayas and Japan.

== Life cycle ==
The adult female will lay her eggs in a clump on the host plant. Once the eggs hatch the caterpillars will feed together until they pupate. There is one brood that flies from July to November.

=== Larval foods ===
- Populus
- Salix
- Betula populifolia
- Betula papyrifera

=== Adult foods ===
- Plant sap
- Rotting fruit
- Willow nectar

== Image Gallery ==
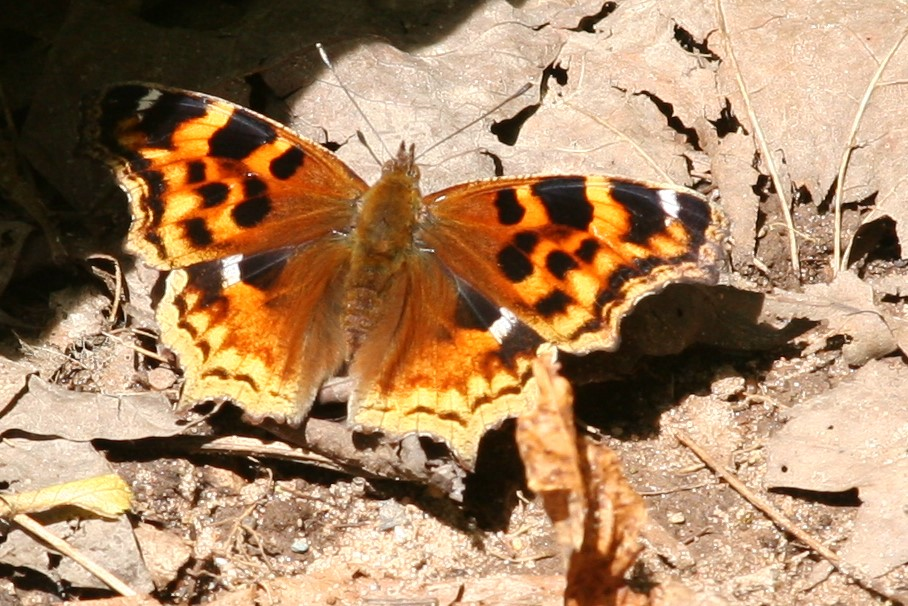
Nymphalis vaualbum, Compton Tortoiseshell butterfly seen in Bruce, WI

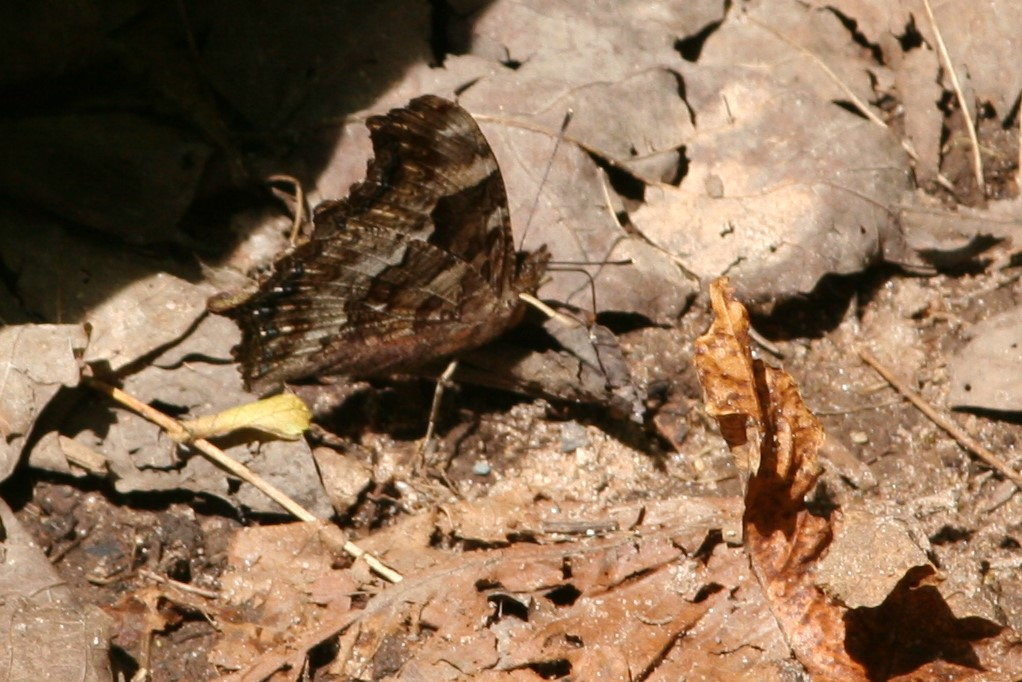
The underside of the Nymphalis vaualbum camouflages itself with the dirt ground and leaves
