= Foord Asset Management =

South African asset management firm

- Trade name: Foord
- Formerly: Foord & Meintjes
- Type: Private
- Industry: Asset management Financial services
- Founded: 1981; 45 years ago
- Founder: Dave Foord; Liston Meintjes
- Headquarters: Cape Town, South Africa
- Area served: South Africa
- Services: Investment management
- AUM: R76.1 billion (2023)
- Website: foord.co.za

Foord, officially Foord Asset Management, is a South African asset management firm, founded in 1981. Headquartered in Cape Town, Foord had assets under management (AUM) totaling R76.1 billion in 2023.

== History ==
The company was founded in October 1981 as Foord & Meintjes, named after the cofounders, Dave Foord and Liston Meintjes. The firm initially provided investment management services to individual investors.

In January 1984, the company secured its first institutional mandate, managing a pension fund portfolio. This marked its expansion into institutional investment management.

Following the relaxation of South Africa's exchange controls during the 1990s, Foord & Meintjes expanded into international investment management. In 1997, it established operations in Guernsey, and launched the Foord International Trust to provide investors with access to international investments.

In 2001, the company adopted the name Foord Asset Management, following cofounder Liston Meintjes' emigration.

In September 2002, the Foord Equity Fund and Foord Balanced Fund were launched, marking the firm's entry into South Africa's unit trust market. The unit trust business initially operated through a joint venture with African Merchant Bank Holdings under the names AMB Foord Asset Management and AMB Foord Unit Trusts. Following Foord's acquisition of its partner's shareholding, the businesses and funds adopted the Foord names in September 2003.

Foord expanded its international operations further in 2012, when it established an investment research office in Singapore and launched the Foord Global Equity Fund. In 2013, it established a Luxembourg-domiciled fund to facilitate distribution of its investment strategies in European markets.

== Operations ==
In 2023, Foord had assets under management (AUM) totaling R76.1 billion, comprising R29.6 billion in institutional mandates and R46.5 billion in retail mandates.

Foord Asset Management provides investment management services to institutional and individual investors, including through its Foord Flexible Fund and Foord International Fund. Foord Asset Management also manages the investment portfolios of Foord Unit Trusts, a separate company.

== See also ==
- Banking in South Africa
