= John Foord-Kelcey =

English cricketer (1860–1931)

Personal information
- Full name: John Foord-Kelcey
- Born: 2 October 1860; Smeeth, Kent, England
- Died: 10 January 1931 (aged 70); Gloucester, Gloucestershire, England
- Batting: Right-handed
- Bowling: Unknown
- Relatives: William Foord-Kelcey (brother); Osbert Mordaunt (nephew)

Domestic team information
- Years: Team
- 1883: Oxford University

Career statistics
Competition	First-class
Matches	2
Runs scored	36
Batting average	12.00
100s/50s	–/–
Top score	23
Balls bowled	280
Wickets	11
Bowling average	11.36
5 wickets in innings	1
10 wickets in match	–
Best bowling	6/58
Catches/stumpings	–/–
- Source: Cricinfo, 3 May 2020

John Foord-Kelcey (2 October 1860 – 10 January 1931) was an English first-class cricketer.

Foord-Kelcey was born at Smeeth near Ashford, Kent as John Foord, with the family changing its name to Foord-Kelcey in May 1872. He was educated at Chatham House Grammar School, before going up to Pembroke College, Oxford. While studying at Oxford, he made two appearances in first-class cricket for Oxford University in 1883, against the Gentlemen of England at Oxford and the Marylebone Cricket Club at Lord's. Against the Gentlemen of England, he took a five wicket haul with figures of 6 for 58 and took nine wickets in the match overall. He later died at Gloucester in January 1931. His brother, William, and nephew Osbert Mordaunt both played first-class cricket.
