= Stu Foord =

Canadian football player (born 1985)

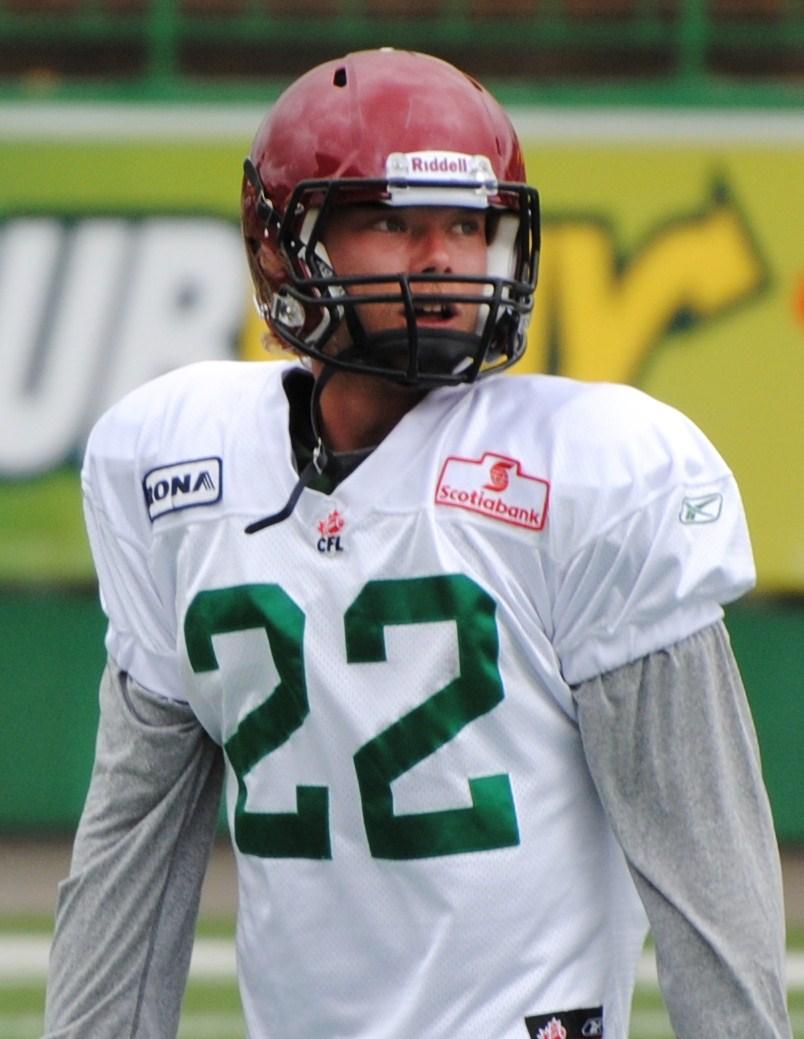

Profile
- Position: Running back

Personal information
- Born: September 23, 1985 (age 41); Regina, Saskatchewan, Canada
- Listed height: 5 ft 11 in (1.80 m)
- Listed weight: 195 lb (88 kg)

Career information
- CJFL: Regina Thunder

Career history
- 2008–2011: Saskatchewan Roughriders
- 2012: BC Lions
- Stats at CFL.ca

Stu Foord (born September 23, 1985) is a Canadian former professional football running back. He was originally signed by the Saskatchewan Roughriders as an undrafted free agent in 2008. Before joining the Roughriders, Foord played five years for the Regina Thunder of the Prairie Football Conference.

== Football career ==
=== Amateur ===
Foord played high school football for Thom Collegiate in Regina. After finishing his high school career, he played junior football for the Regina Thunder of the Prairie Football Conference. Foord was invited to the Saskatchewan Roughriders training camp after the 2006 season, but was cut due to a combination of on-field performance and off-field issues. He returned to play for the Thunder during the 2007 season, where he was ranked among the PFC's top five in all-purpose yards, kick return yards, punt return yards, rushing, receiving and punt returns. Foord was named the Thunder's most valuable player after his last two seasons with the club.

=== Professional ===
After the 2007 season, Foord received another invitation to the Roughriders' training camp. After a much improved performance, on and off the field, he was placed on the team's waived / injured list, but was signed to the team's 42 man roster after an injury to Chris Szarka. He made his debut with the Roughriders during Week 2 of the 2008 CFL season, against the BC Lions. Foord was named the CFL's Canadian Player of the Week on September 24, 2008, for his performance against the BC Lions. He scored a touchdown on his first ever rushing attempt in the CFL, and also had a receiving touchdown later in the game. Of his rushing touchdown, Foord said "I knew that I would be so jacked up that if anything was there, I was going to take it. I did that and now I can say my first touch was a touchdown." Foord finished the 2008 season with three touchdowns (two rushing and one receiving).

During the 2009 CFL season, Foord dressed for every Roughrider game, including the West Final and the Grey Cup. He was one of the team's backup running backs, and also saw time on special teams, including returning kickoffs. Foord scored a single rushing touchdown during the 2009 season. In the offseason, Foord signed a new contract with the Roughriders.

On February 16, 2012, Foord signed with the BC Lions as a free agent.

== Personal life ==
Foord lives in Regina year round. During the off-season, he trained with former Roughrider Dan Farthing. Foord was planning to continue his football career and education at either the University of Regina or the University of Manitoba if he was unable to make the jump to the professional ranks after his junior football eligibility was exhausted. During the offseason, prior to the 2010 CFL season, Foord vacationed in Mexico and learned to surf.
