= William Foord-Kelcey =

English barrister, academic and cricketer (1854–1922)

Personal information
- Full name: William Foord-Kelcey
- Born: 21 April 1854; Smeeth, Kent, England
- Died: 3 January 1922 (aged 67); Woolwich, Kent, England
- Batting: Right-handed
- Bowling: Right-arm fast
- Relatives: John Foord-Kelcey (brother); Osbert Mordaunt (nephew)

Domestic team information
- Years: Team
- 1874–1875: Oxford University
- 1874–1883: Kent
- FC debut: 28 May 1874 Oxford University v Marylebone Cricket Club (MCC)
- Last FC: 16 August 1883 Kent v Yorkshire

Career statistics
Competition	First-class
Matches	78
Runs scored	1,798
Batting average	14.26
100s/50s	1/5
Top score	105
Balls bowled	11,684
Wickets	272
Bowling average	17.75
5 wickets in innings	18
10 wickets in match	6
Best bowling	8/49
Catches/stumpings	66/–
- Source: CricInfo, 29 June 2017

William Foord-Kelcey OBE (21 April 1854 – 3 January 1922) was an English barrister, academic and amateur cricketer. He played first-class cricket for Oxford University and Kent County Cricket Club.

== Early life ==
Foord-Kelcey was born at Smeeth near Ashford, Kent as William Foord. The family changed its name to Foord-Kelcey in May 1872. He was educated at Chatham House Grammar School in Ramsgate and at Exeter College, Oxford.

== Cricket career ==
At Oxford, he was a member of the University cricket XI in 1874 and in 1875, making his first-class debut for the university against Marylebone Cricket Club (MCC) in May 1874. He played in nine matches for Oxford, including the 1874 and 1875 University matches.

Foord-Kelcey made his debut for Kent in July 1874. He played 64 times for the county team, making his final appearances in 1883. He took eight wickets in an innings twice for Kent, with his best bowling figures of 8/49 taken against Lancashire. He was awarded his county cap in 1882. Foord-Kelcey was described in his Wisden obituary as a "hard-hitting batsman, a round-armed bowler of great pace, and a capital field at mid-off".

== Professional career and later life ==
He began studying law at the Inner Temple in 1877 and was called to the bar in 1880. He was appointed as a lecturer at the Royal Military Academy, Woolwich and in 1903 became professor of Mathematics and Mechanics at the academy. He was at the RMA for 44 years and was awarded the OBE in 1919.

Foord-Kelcey's brother John also played first-class cricket for Oxford University and his nephew Osbert Mordaunt played for Somerset. His son, also named John, was killed in action in July 1916 at the start of the Battle of the Somme during the First World War.

Foord-Kelcey died at Woolwich in 1922 aged 68. His house in Margate is marked with a blue plaque.

== Bibliography ==
- Carlaw, Derek (2020). Kent County Cricketers, A to Z: Part One (1806–1914) (PDF). Cardiff: ACS.
