= Christine Foord =

British entomologist and photographer (1922–2015)

- Born: Christine Anita McDermott; 3 February 1922
- Died: 5 January 2015 (aged 92); Brighton, England
- Occupations: Entomologist, photographer
- Years active: 1950–1990

Christine Foord (1922–2015, née McDermott) was a British entomologist and nature photographer.

== Biography ==
Foord was born on 3 February 1922. Her parents were journalist Gerald McDermott (1879–1965), and Lucy Ogilvie McDermott (née McDermott, 1882–1945). Gerald and Lucy were cousins and had married in 1906. Foord had an older brother named Andrew Walter McDermott (1913–1959).

As Miss C.A. McDermott, Foord was elected a Member of the South London Entomological Society in 1950, with her particular field of study being listed as butterflies ["rh" or Rhopalocera].

In 1953, Foord recorded the first known occurrence on the British list of the migrant butterfly Nymphalis xanthomelas, at Shipbourne in Kent: she later gave her specimen to the Natural History Museum, London.

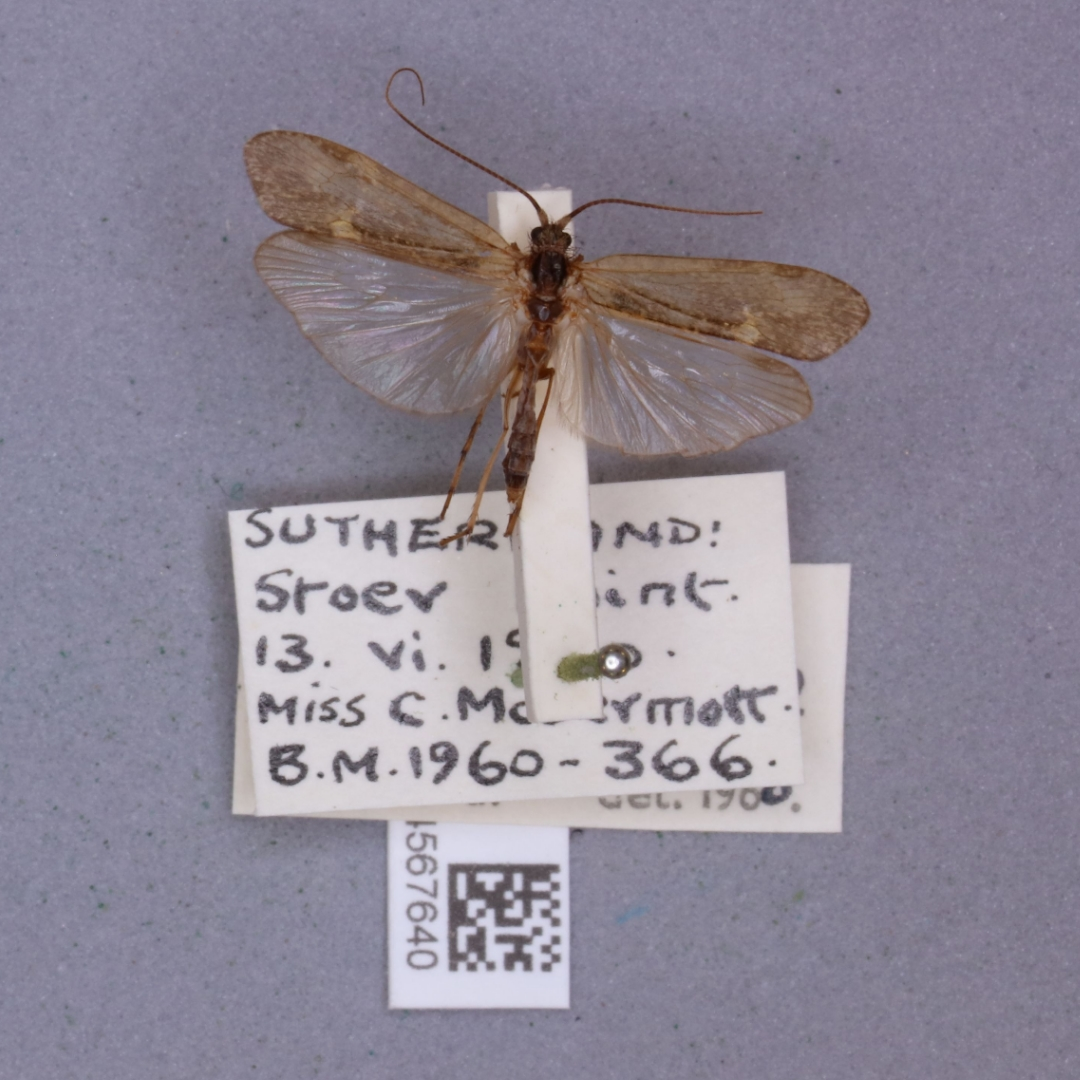
a specimen of the caddisfly species Limnephilus sparsus Curtis, 1834, collected by Miss C. McDermott [Christine Foord] at Stoer Point, Sutherland, Scotland on 13 June 1960 (NHMUK014567640)

In the 1950s and 1960s, Foord lived at a McDermott family house that had once belonged to her great-uncle Frederick (c.1856–1924) and great-aunt Constance McDermott (c. 1855 – 1930), "The Dene" at Borough Green in Kent. In this period Foord was documented as contributing specimens and occurrence data to the South London Entomological Society, plus organising excursions. Foord presented specimens of caddisfly species Chimarra marginata, Limnephilus sparsus and Limnephilus centralis that she had collected in Scotland to the Natural History Museum in 1960.

Christine McDermott married Ronald Foord (1923–2000) in 1967. As a couple, the Foords created an archive of around 1000 black and white negatives and 35,000 colour transparencies they had taken of plants and insects, including U.K. wildflowers: they sometimes contributed their images to articles in the magazine Country Life.

In the early 1970s, the Foords were members of the council of the charity the Kent Trust for Nature Conservation, which later became the Kent Wildlife Trust.

Foord died in Brighton, on 5 January 2015, aged 92.
