= Osbert Mordaunt (cricketer, born 1876) =

English cricketer

Personal information
- Full name: Osbert Cautley Mordaunt
- Born: 26 May 1876; Flax Bourton, Somerset
- Died: 20 October 1949 (aged 73); Bells Yew Green, East Sussex
- Batting: Right-handed
- Bowling: Right-arm slow
- Role: Bowler
- Relatives: William Foord-Kelcey (uncle); John Foord-Kelcey (uncle)

Domestic team information
- Years: Team
- 1905–1910: Somerset
- First-class debut: 12 June 1905 Somerset v Middlesex
- Last First-class: 4 July 1914 L Robinson's XI v Oxford University

Career statistics
Competition	First-class
Matches	17
Runs scored	148
Batting average	6.72
100s/50s	0/0
Top score	23
Balls bowled	2,049
Wickets	42
Bowling average	26.54
5 wickets in innings	1
10 wickets in match	0
Best bowling	5/68
Catches/stumpings	12/–
- Source: CricketArchive, 27 October 2010

Osbert Cautley Mordaunt DSO (26 May 1876 – 20 October 1949) played first-class cricket for Somerset between 1905 and 1910 and for various amateur teams in the years up to 1914. He was born at Flax Bourton, Somerset and died at Bells Yew Green, East Sussex.

== Family ==
Mordaunt was the second son of Harry Mordaunt and Annie (his cousin, née Cautley), of Aspley Guise, Bedfordshire, and a descendant of Sir Charles Mordaunt, 6th Baronet. The name "Osbert" has been used by members of the Mordaunt family since the 12th century, in honour of a direct ancestor of that name; others include Canon Osbert Mordaunt, the rector of Hampton Lucy, Warwickshire and a 19th-century cricket player, also a descendant of the 6th Baronet, and the soldier and poet Thomas Osbert Mordaunt, of a senior branch of the family, the Earls of Peterborough. Osbert Cautley Mordaunt's ancestor, Sir L'Estrange Mordaunt, 1st Baronet, descended from William, the younger brother of John, the first Baron Mordaunt; from John, the fifth Baron (created Earl of Peterborough in 1628) descended.

== Cricket career ==
Mordaunt was a right-handed lower-order batsman and a right-arm slow bowler. He made his debut for Somerset in a single match in 1905 against Middlesex at Lord's. He made little impression in that match or in two further games in 1906, but in the very weak Somerset side of 1907 he appeared 10 times and his slow bowling took 30 wickets. His best return and the only time he took five wickets in an innings came in the game against Gloucestershire, when he took five for 68 in the first innings and four for 24 in the second, sharing the wickets in the match with Talbot Lewis (there was one run out batsman). After 1907, Mordaunt played only one further match for Somerset in 1910.

In 1906 and 1908, Mordaunt appeared in non-first-class matches for the Army cricket team, and a combined Army and Navy side was one of the amateur teams he played for in a handful of first-class matches against university sides after 1910.

== Military career ==
Mordaunt joined the Somerset Light Infantry and in 1911 was on the staff of the Royal Military College, Sandhurst. In 1916, with the rank of major, he was promoted to acting lieutenant-colonel and seconded as an assistant director of signals. At the end of the First World War, Mordaunt is cited in a report on the final fighting in Italy as deputy director of Signals and had been awarded the Distinguished Service Order.

In 1919 he was appointed as officer commanding the School of Signals, which predated the establishment the following year of the Royal Corps of Signals, to which he was then permanently assigned. He retired from the army on half pay in 1924.
