= Edward Foord =

British Army officer and cricketer (1825–1899)

Lieutenant-General Edward Foord
- Born: Edward Archibald Foord; 30 May 1825; Madras, Madras Presidency, British India
- Died: 28 February 1899 (aged 73); Bursledon, Hampshire, England
- Cricket career

Cricket information
- Batting: Unknown

Career statistics
Competition	First-class
Matches	1
Runs scored	0
Batting average	0.00
100s/50s	–/–
Top score	0
Catches/stumpings	–/–
- Source: Cricinfo, 30 August 2019

Lieutenant-General Edward Archibald Foord (30 May 1825 – 28 February 1899) was a British Army officer and English first-class cricketer.

Foord was born in British India at Madras in May 1825. He was commissioned into the Royal Engineers as an ensign in December 1842, having been a cadet of the East India Company. He was promoted to the rank of captain in April 1858, with promotion to the rank of lieutenant-colonel coming in September 1863. He returned to England around 1871, making a single appearance in first-class cricket in that year for W. G. Grace's personal XI against Kent at Maidstone. Batting once in the match, Foord was dismissed without scoring by George Bennett. In June 1872, he was promoted to the rank of colonel, with promotion to the rank of major-general coming just over six years later in December 1878. Three days later he was made a lieutenant-general, at which point he retired from active service. Foord died at Bursledon in February 1899.
